= 2021–22 FC Baník Ostrava season =

FC Baník Ostrava
2021–22 season
- Chairman: Václav Brabec
- Manager: Ondřej Smetana
- Stadium: Městský stadion
- Czech First League: 5th
- Czech Cup: Fourth Round
Home colours	Away colours

The 2021–22 season is the 30th season in the existence of FC Baník Ostrava and the club's 10th consecutive season in the top flight of Czech football. In addition to the domestic league, FC Baník Ostrava are participating in this season's edition of the Czech Cup.

== Players ==
=== First-team squad ===
As of 16 July 2021.

Note: Flags indicate national team as defined under FIFA eligibility rules; some limited exceptions apply. Players may hold more than one non-FIFA nationality.

No.	Pos.	Nation	Player
3	FW	CZE	Daniel Šmiga
4	MF	NGR	Yira Sor
5	MF	CZE	Adam Jánoš
6	MF	CZE	Daniel Tetour
7	MF	CZE	Ondřej Chvěja
8	DF	CZE	Jaroslav Harušťák
9	MF	CZE	David Buchta
11	MF	SRB	Nemanja Kuzmanović
12	GK	CZE	Radovan Murin
13	MF	CZE	Roman Potočný
16	GK	CZE	Jan Laštůvka
17	DF	GAM	Muhammed Sanneh (on loan from Paide)
18	FW	CZE	Tomáš Zajíc
19	DF	CZE	David Lischka (on loan from Sparta Prague)

No.	Pos.	Nation	Player
20	DF	CZE	Jakub Pokorný
21	FW	CZE	Jiří Klíma
22	MF	CZE	Filip Kaloč
23	DF	CZE	Jaroslav Svozil
24	DF	CZE	Jan Juroška
25	DF	CZE	Jiří Fleišman
30	GK	SVK	Viktor Budinský
32	MF	CZE	Lukáš Budínský
33	DF	CZE	Ondřej Kukučka
66	DF	CZE	Denis Granečný
77	DF	NED	Gigli Ndefe
91	MF	BRA	Dyjan
99	FW	SVK	Ladislav Almási

=== Out on loan ===
Note: Flags indicate national team as defined under FIFA eligibility rules; some limited exceptions apply. Players may hold more than one non-FIFA nationality.

No.	Pos.	Nation	Player
—	MF	CZE	Rudolf Reiter (at FC Fastav Zlín)
—	FW	CZE	Ondřej Šašinka (at 1. FC Slovácko)

No.	Pos.	Nation	Player
—	MF	CZE	Lukáš Cienciala (at FK Dukla Prague)
—	MF	CZE	Jiří Boula (at FC MAS Táborsko)

== Pre-season and friendlies ==
Win Draw Loss Fixtures

== Competitions ==
=== Overall record ===
Competition	First match	Last match	Starting round	Record							
Competition	First match	Last match	Starting round	Pld	W	D	L	GF	GA	GD	Win %
Czech First League	24 July 2021	May 2022	Matchday 1	2	1	0	1	5	2	+3	50.00
Czech Cup	TBD			0	0	0	0	0	0	+0	—
Total				2	1	0	1	5	2	+3	50.00

Last updated: 31 July 2021
Source: Soccerway

=== Czech First League ===
==== Results summary ====
Overall								Home						Away					
Pld	W	D	L	GF	GA	GD	Pts	W	D	L	GF	GA	GD	W	D	L	GF	GA	GD
35	15	10	10	60	48	+12	55	8	6	3	35	23	+12	7	4	7	25	25	0

Source: Fortuna Liga

==== Results by round ====
Round	1	2	3	4	5	6	7	8	9	10	11	12	13	14	15	16	17	18	19	20	21	22	23	24	25	26	27	28	29	30	31	32	33	34	35
Ground	A	H	A	H	A	H	A	A	H	A	H	H	A	H	A	A	H	A	H	A	H	H	A	H	A	H	A	H	A	H	A	A	H	H	A
Result	L	W	W	W	L	W	W	D	W	W	L	D	D	D	W	D	W	W	D	W	L	W	W	D	D	L	L	D	L	W	L	L	W	D	L
Position	13	5	4	4	5	5	4	4	4	4	5	5	5	5	5	5	5	5	5	5	5	4	4	4	4	5	5	5	5	5	5	5	5	5	5

Updated to match(es) played on 15 May 2022. Source: Fortuna Liga
A = Away; H = Home; W = Win; D = Draw; L = Loss

==== Regular season ====
===== League table =====
Pos	Team	Pld	W	D	L	GF	GA	GD	Pts	Qualification or relegation
3	Sparta Prague	30	20	6	4	65	32	+33	66	Qualification for the championship group
4	Slovácko	30	18	5	7	50	30	+20	59	Qualification for the championship group
5	Baník Ostrava	30	14	9	7	54	39	+15	51	Qualification for the championship group
6	Hradec Králové	30	9	13	8	38	40	−2	40	Qualification for the championship group
7	Mladá Boleslav	30	11	5	14	45	48	−3	38	Qualification for the play-off

Source: Fortuna Liga
Rules for classification: 1) Points; 2) Head-to-head points; 3) Head-to-head goal difference; 4) Head-to-head goals scored; 5) Goal difference; 6) Goals scored; 7) Fair-play ranking; 8) Draw.

===== Matches =====
24 July 2021 1	Jablonec	1–0	Baník Ostrava	Jablonec nad Nisou
15:00 CEST (UTC+2)	Pilař 88'	Report		Stadium: Stadion Střelnice; Attendance: 2,385; Referee: Ondrej Pechanec

1 August 2021 2	Baník Ostrava	5–1	Fastav Zlín	Ostrava
16:00 CEST (UTC+2)	Lischka 9', 26', (yellow card) 90+3'; Sor 13'; Almási 34'; Buchta 51'	Report	Poznar 70'; Janetzký (yellow card) 81'; Cedidla (yellow card) 87'	Stadium: Městský stadion Attendance: 4,602; Referee: Pavel Julínek

7 August 2021 3	České Budějovice	1–3	Baník Ostrava	České Budějovice
16:00 CEST (UTC+2)	Bassey (yellow card) 47', (goal) 58'; Čavoš (yellow card) 86'	Report	Laštůvka (yellow card) 28'; Kuzmanović 34'; Tetour 52'; Kaloč (yellow card) 81'; Lischka 88'	Stadium: Stadion Střelecký ostrov Attendance: 3,286; Referee: Miroslav Zelinka

15 August 2021 4	Baník Ostrava	3–1	Pardubice	Ostrava
16:00 CEST (UTC+2)	Kaloč (yellow card) 39'; Tetour 54'; Dyjan 73'; Klíma 85'	Report	Chytil (yellow card) 29'; Čihák (yellow card) 37'; Čelůstka (yellow card) 43'; Kostka 72'	Stadium: Městský stadion Attendance: 5,723; Referee: Jan Petřík

22 August 2021 5	Slavia Prague	4–0	Baník Ostrava	Prague
19:00 CEST (UTC+2)	Kacharaba (yellow card) 15'; Tecl 30'; Kúdela (yellow card) 32', (goal) 66' (pen.); Samek 45'; Lingr 51'; Hromada (yellow card) 78'	Report	Almási (yellow card) 25'; Dyjan (yellow card) 29'; Svozil (yellow card) 42'; Ndefe (yellow card) 45+2' (yellow-red card) 78'	Stadium: Sinobo Stadium; Attendance: 11,846; Referee: Ondřej Berka

28 August 2021 6	Baník Ostrava	1–0	Mladá Boleslav	Ostrava
16:00 CEST (UTC+2)	Fleišman 31'; Sor (yellow card) 90+2'; Kuzmanović (yellow card) 90+3'	Report	Dancák (yellow card) 43'; Ewerton (yellow card) 76'; Jurásek (yellow card) 90+2'; Karafiát (yellow card) 90+3'	Stadium: Městský stadion Attendance: 5,071; Referee: Karel Hrubeš

11 September 2021 7	Teplice	1–2	Baník Ostrava	Teplice
16:00 CEST (UTC+2)	Trubač 62'; Krunert (yellow card) 71'; Succar (yellow card) 90+1'; Knapík (yellow card) 90+3'	Report	Lischka (yellow card) 26'; Almási 66'; Sor (yellow card) 68'; Mazuch 80' (o.g.)	Stadium: AGC Aréna Na Stínadlech; Attendance: 2,568; Referee: Dalibor Černý

17 September 2021 8	Sigma Olomouc	1–1	Baník Ostrava	Olomouc
19:00 CEST (UTC+2)	Hála 10'; Breite (yellow card) 39'; Sedlák (yellow card) 63'; Pablo González (yellow card) 72'; Zifčák (red card) 74'	Report	Sor (yellow card) 23'; Ndefe (yellow card) 32'; Tetour (yellow card) 39'; Almási 84'	Stadium: Andrův stadion Attendance: 8,613; Referee: Tomáš Klíma

25 September 2021 9	Baník Ostrava	4–1	Bohemians 1905	Ostrava
16:00 CEST (UTC+2)	Budínský 37'; Kuzmanović 48' (yellow card) 53' (yellow-red card) 78'; Pokorný 65'; Almási 74'	Report	Chramosta 10'; Dostál (yellow card) 54'; Bačkovský (yellow card) 90'; Vondra (yellow card) 90+2'	Stadium: Městský stadion Attendance: 6,969; Referee: Pavel Franěk

3 October 2021 10	Slovan Liberec	0–2	Baník Ostrava	Liberec
16:00 CEST (UTC+2)	Tiéhi (yellow card) 10' (red card) 38'; Matoušek (yellow card) 49'; Chaluš (yellow card) 90+3'	Report	Fleišman 43'; Svozil (yellow card) 45'; Klíma (yellow card) 45+3'; Almási 63' (yellow card) 73' (yellow-red card) 85'; Potočný (yellow card) 70'	Stadium: Stadion u Nisy; Attendance: 3,200; Referee: Jan Machálek

16 October 2021 11	Baník Ostrava	1–2	Slovácko	Ostrava
16:00 CEST (UTC+2)	Tetour 32' (pen.); Fleišman (yellow card) 41'; Potočný (yellow card) 53'	Report	Jurečka 5'; Hofmann (yellow card) 31'; Sadílek 75'	Stadium: Městský stadion Attendance: 7,713; Referee: Ondřej Ginzel

31 October 2021 13	Baník Ostrava	2–2	Sparta Prague	Ostrava
15:00 CEST (UTC+2)	Kuzmanović (yellow card) 45+2'; Buchta 50'; Pokorný (yellow card) 73'; Tetour 88' (pen.); Sor (yellow card) 90+4'	Report	Pešek 31'; Čelůstka (yellow card) 45+2'; Hancko (yellow card) 60' (goal) 72' (pen.)	Stadium: Městský stadion Attendance: 14,572; Referee: Ondřej Berka

6 November 2021 14	Hradec Králové	1–1	Baník Ostrava	Mladá Boleslav (Note: Hradec Králové played their home matches in Mladá Boleslav due to the rebuilding of their own Všesportovní stadion.)
15:00 CET (UTC+1)	Kubala 65'; Novotný (yellow card) 72'	Report	Gigli Ndefe (yellow card) 22'; Almási (yellow card) 48'; Kuzmanović 73'; Potočný (yellow card) 87'	Stadium: Lokotrans Aréna; Attendance: 1,211; Referee: Tomáš Batík

20 November 2021 15	Baník Ostrava	2–2	Viktoria Plzeň	Ostrava
18:00 CET (UTC+1)	Juroška (yellow card) 45+1'; Fleišman (yellow card) 57'; Klíma 67' 83'; Almási (yellow card) 90+6'	Report	Mosquera 12'; Beauguel (yellow card) 28' (goal) 36' (pen.); Sýkora (yellow card) 75'	Stadium: Městský stadion Attendance: 6,774; Referee: Jan Petřík

24 November 2021 12	Karviná	1–2	Baník Ostrava	Karviná
17:00 CET (UTC+1)	Santos 58' (yellow card) 81'; Mangabeira (yellow card) 77'; Mikuš (yellow card) 90+1'	Report	Fleišman (yellow card) 33'; Sor 68'; Klíma 90+2'	Stadium: Městský stadion Attendance: 3,126; Referee: Miroslav Zelinka

27 November 2021 16	Fastav Zlín	2–2	Baník Ostrava	Zlín
15:00 CET (UTC+1)	Tkáč 18'; Chanturishvili (yellow card) 38'; Cedidla (yellow card) 51'; Poznar (yellow card) 60'; Procházka 86' (yellow card) 90+2'	Report	Tetour (yellow card) 10'; Almási 16'; Kaloč (yellow card) 32'; Dyjan 52' (pen.)	Stadium: Letná Stadion; Attendance: 576; Referee: Pavel Franěk

5 December 2021 17	Baník Ostrava	4–1	České Budějovice	Ostrava
15:00 CET (UTC+1)	Klíma 2' (yellow card) 72'; Fleišman 7'; Buchta 27'; Kuzmanović 87'	Report	Bassey (yellow card) 49'; Králik (yellow card) 55'; Vais (yellow card) 63'; van Buren (yellow card) 79'; Škoda 85'	Stadium: Městský stadion Attendance: 1,000; Referee: Tomáš Batík

11 December 2021 18	Pardubice	0–3	Baník Ostrava	Prague (Note: Pardubice continued playing their home matches in Ďolíček due to the rebuilding of their own stadium Pod Vinicí.)
15:00 CET (UTC+1)	Kostka (yellow card) 35'; Jeřábek (yellow card) 48'	Report	Buchta 19'; Lischka (yellow card) 25'; Kuzmanović 32'; Sor 76'	Stadium: Ďolíček; Attendance: 537; Referee: Ondřej Berka

19 December 2021 19	Baník Ostrava	3–3	Slavia Prague	Ostrava
18:00 CET (UTC+1)	Svozil (yellow card) 40'; Almási 46' 82' (pen.); Klíma (yellow card) 57'; Kaloč 69'	Report	Dorley (yellow card) 15' (red card) 51'; Schranz 24'; Holeš 29' 88'; Masopust (yellow card) 40'; Kuchta (red card) 81'	Stadium: Městský stadion Attendance: 1,000; Referee: Dalibor Černý

6 February 2022 20	Mladá Boleslav	2–3	Baník Ostrava	Mladá Boleslav
15:00 CET (UTC+1)	Douděra (yellow card) 24'; Hlavatý 42'; Ewerton 72' (pen.)	Report	Kuzmanović 4', (yellow card) 56'; Klíma 25' (pen.), 50'; Fleišman (yellow card) 70'	Stadium: Lokotrans Aréna; Attendance: 1,000; Referee: Pavel Orel

12 February 2022 21	Baník Ostrava	2–4	Teplice	Ostrava
18:00 CET (UTC+1)	Almási 21', 83'	Report	Sejk 41', 70'; Žák 62'; Mareček 90+4'	Stadium: Městský stadion Attendance: 1,000; Referee: Josef Krejsa

19 February 2022 22	Baník Ostrava	1–0	Sigma Olomouc	Ostrava
15:00 CET (UTC+1)	Pokorný 81'	Report		Stadium: Městský stadion Attendance: 6,151; Referee: Tomáš Batík

26 February 2022 23	Bohemians 1905	0–2	Baník Ostrava	Prague
15:00 CET (UTC+1)		Report	Kuzmanović 75'; Almási 83'	Stadium: Ďolíček; Attendance: 2,346; Referee: Petr Hocek

5 March 2022 24	Baník Ostrava	1–1	Slovan Liberec	Ostrava
18:00 CET (UTC+1)	Almási 19'	Report	Mikula 79'	Stadium: Městský stadion Attendance: 6,249; Referee: Marek Radina

12 March 2022 25	Slovácko	0–0	Baník Ostrava	Uherské Hradiště
15:00 CET (UTC+1)		Report		Stadium: Městský fotbalový stadion Miroslava Valenty; Attendance: 7,117; Referee: Tomáš Klíma

19 March 2022 26	Baník Ostrava	1–3	Karviná	Ostrava
15:00 CET (UTC+1)	Almási 66'	Report	Zorvan 10'; Durosinmi 13'; Bartošák 27'	Stadium: Městský stadion Attendance: 7,076; Referee: Ladislav Szikszay

2 April 2022 27	Sparta Prague	2–1	Baník Ostrava	Prague
19:00 CEST (UTC+2)	Hložek 16'; Wiesner 41'	Report	Svozil 8'	Stadium: Generali Arena; Attendance: 15,205; Referee: Tomáš Klíma

10 April 2022 28	Baník Ostrava	0–0	Hradec Králové	Ostrava
16:00 CEST (UTC+2)		Report		Stadium: Městský stadion Attendance: 5,441; Referee: Marek Radina

17 April 2022 29	Viktoria Plzeň	2–1	Baník Ostrava	Plzeň
17:00 CEST (UTC+2)	Mosquera 31'; Řezník (yellow card) 54'; Bucha 65'	Report	Takács (yellow card) 46'; Klíma (yellow card) 54'; Pokorný (yellow card) 54'; Havel 62' (o.g.)	Stadium: Doosan Arena; Attendance: 10,726; Referee: Ondřej Berka

20 April 2022 30	Baník Ostrava	1–0	Jablonec	Ostrava
18:00 CEST (UTC+2)	Buchta 11'; Ndefe (yellow card) 34'; Lischka (yellow card) 49'; Jaroň (yellow card) 64'; Fleišman (yellow card) 66'	Report	Surzyn (yellow card) 57'; Kadlec (yellow card) 64'; Houska (yellow card) 66'; Zelený (yellow card) 68'	Stadium: Městský stadion Attendance: 4,098; Referee: Tomáš Batík

==== Championship group ====
===== League table =====
Pos	Team	Pld	W	D	L	GF	GA	GD	Pts	Qualification or relegation	PLZ	SLA	SPA	SLO	OST	HKR
1	Viktoria Plzeň (C)	35	26	7	2	63	21	+42	85	Qualification for the Champions League second qualifying round	—	—	3–0	3–1	1–0	—
2	Slavia Prague	35	24	6	5	80	27	+53	78	Qualification for the Europa Conference League second qualifying round	1–1	—	1–2	3–0	—	—
3	Sparta Prague	35	22	7	6	72	40	+32	73	Qualification for the Europa Conference League second qualifying round	—	—	—	1–2	3–1	1–1
4	Slovácko	35	21	5	9	59	38	+21	68	Qualification to Europa League third qualifying round (Note: Slovácko qualified for the Europa League as Czech Cup winners.)	—	—	—	—	3–1	3–0
5	Baník Ostrava	35	15	10	10	60	48	+12	55		—	1–1	—	—	—	3–1
6	Hradec Králové	35	10	14	11	44	52	−8	44		0–2	4–3	—	—	—	—

Source: Fortuna Liga
Legend: Blue = home team win; Yellow = draw; Red = away team win.
Rules for classification: 1) Total points; 2) Points earned in regular season; 3) Head-to-head points (regular season); 4) Head-to-head goal difference (regular season); 5) Head-to-head goals scored (regular season); 5) Goal difference (all matches); 6) Goals scored (all matches); 7) Fair-play ranking; 8) Draw.
(C) Champions

===== Matches =====
23 April 2022 31	Sparta Prague	3–1	Baník Ostrava	Prague
20:00 CEST (UTC+2)	L. Krejčí II 41'; Čvančara 75'; Haraslín 81'	Report	Almási 90+3'	Stadium: Generali Arena; Attendance: 8,617; Referee: Dalibor Černý

30 April 2022 32	Slovácko	3–1	Baník Ostrava	Uherské Hradiště
16:00 CEST (UTC+2)	Jurečka 55' (pen.), 69', 90+5'	Report	Klíma 6'	Stadium: Městský fotbalový stadion Miroslava Valenty; Attendance: 4,727; Referee: Marek Radina

11 May 2022 34	Baník Ostrava	1–1	Slavia Prague	Ostrava
19:00 CEST (UTC+2)	Buchta 32'; Kaloč (yellow card) 40'; Pokorný (yellow card) 44'; Almási (yellow card) 60'; Ndefe (yellow card) 62'; Laštůvka (yellow card) 85'	Report	Sor 5'; Hromada (yellow card) 40'; Holeš (yellow card) 77'	Stadium: Městský stadion Attendance: 8,728; Referee: Petr Hocek

=== Czech Cup ===
25 August 2021 Second round	Hlučín	0–1 (a.e.t.)	Baník Ostrava	Hlučín
17:00 CEST (UTC+2)		Report		Stadium: Městský fotbalový stadion Hlučín

22 September 2021 Third round	Loko Vltavín	2–5 (a.e.t.)	Baník Ostrava	Prague
15:45 CEST (UTC+2)	Trávníček (yellow card) 14'; Matějka (yellow card) 19', (goal) 82'; Pejsa 86'; Štorc (yellow card) 101'	Report	Buchta (yellow card) 31'; Jánoš (yellow card) 35'; Chvěja 45+2', 102' (pen.), (yellow card) 105'; Klíma 47'; Sor 111'; Smekal (yellow card) 114', (goal) 119'	Stadium: Stadion Lokomotiva Praha; Attendance: 740; Referee: Radek Dubravsky

27 October 2021 Fourth round	Baník Ostrava	1–2	Hradec Králové	Ostrava
16:30 CEST (UTC+2)	Buchta 51'	Report	Čech (yellow card) 27'; Harazim 29'; Prekop (yellow card) 30', (goal) 60'; Urma (yellow card) 67'; Vízek (yellow card) 85'	Stadium: Městský stadion Referee: Jan Machálek
