= 2023–24 FC Baník Ostrava season =

FC Baník Ostrava
2023–24 season
- Manager: Pavel Hapal
- Stadium: Městský stadion
- Czech First League: 4th
- Czech Cup: Fourth round
- Top goalscorer: League: Abdullahi Tanko (9); All: Abdullahi Tanko (9)
- Average home league attendance: 9,360

The 2023–24 season was FC Baník Ostrava's 102nd season in existence and seventh consecutive in the Czech First League. They also competed in the Czech Cup.

== Players ==
=== First-team squad ===
As of 10 September 2023.

Note: Flags indicate national team as defined under FIFA eligibility rules; some limited exceptions apply. Players may hold more than one non-FIFA nationality.

No.	Pos.	Nation	Player
1	GK	CZE	Martin Hrubý
5	MF	CZE	Jiří Boula
6	MF	CZE	Daniel Tetour
7	DF	CZE	Karel Pojezný
9	MF	CZE	David Buchta
10	MF	CZE	Matěj Šín
11	DF	BIH	Eldar Šehić
12	MF	SVK	Tomáš Rigo
13	MF	CZE	Samuel Grygar
15	MF	GHA	Patrick Kpozo
17	DF	CZE	Michal Frydrych
18	MF	CRO	Robert Mišković
19	DF	CZE	David Lischka
20	FW	NGR	Abdullahi Tanko

No.	Pos.	Nation	Player
21	FW	CZE	Jiří Klíma
22	MF	CZE	Filip Kaloč
24	DF	CZE	Jan Juroška
26	DF	SVK	Filip Blažek
28	FW	CZE	Filip Kubala
29	MF	CZE	Ladislav Takács
30	GK	CZE	Jiří Letáček
32	MF	BRA	Ewerton (on loan from Slavia Prague)
35	GK	CZE	Jakub Markovič
37	DF	SVK	Matej Madleňák (on loan from Ružomberok)
77	DF	ANG	Gigli Ndefe
99	FW	SVK	Ladislav Almási
—	MF	NGR	David Fadairo (on loan from Lagos Islanders)

=== Out on loan ===
Note: Flags indicate national team as defined under FIFA eligibility rules; some limited exceptions apply. Players may hold more than one non-FIFA nationality.

No.	Pos.	Nation	Player
—	FW	CZE	Daniel Smékal (at Skalica)
—	DF	CZE	Jiří Fleišman (at Karviná)
—	DF	CZE	Lukáš Cienciala (at Prostějov)
—	MF	CZE	Petr Jaroň (at Prostějov)
—	DF	GAM	Muhammed Sanneh (at Vlašim)

No.	Pos.	Nation	Player
—	DF	CZE	Jan Fulnek (at Kroměříž)
—	MF	CZE	Marek Jaroň (at Kroměříž)
—	GK	CZE	Michael Gergela (at Kroměříž)
—	DF	CZE	David Stoklásek (at Kroměříž)
—	MF	NGR	Stanley Charles (at Kroměříž)

== Transfers ==
=== In ===
Pos.	Player	Transferred from	Fee	Date	Source

=== Out ===
Pos.	Player	Transferred to	Fee	Date	Source

== Pre-season and friendlies ==
Win Draw Loss

24 June 2023 Friendly	Baník Ostrava (Czech Republic)	1–2	(Slovakia) MFK Skalica
17:00

28 June 2023 Friendly	Baník Ostrava (Czech Republic)	8–1	(Slovakia) Spartak Myjava
17:00

2 July 2023 Friendly	Baník Ostrava (Czech Republic)	5–0	(Romania) Farul Constanța	Poland
11:00

5 July 2023 Friendly	Cracovia (Poland)	0–1	(Czech Republic) Baník Ostrava
16:30

8 July 2023 Friendly	Lech Poznań (Poland)	1–1	(Czech Republic) Baník Ostrava
11:00

15 July 2023 Friendly	MŠK Žilina (Slovakia)	0–0	(Czech Republic) Baník Ostrava
16:00

20 January 2024 Friendly	Baník Ostrava (Czech Republic)	0–0	(Czech Republic) Vyškov	Ostrava
11:00				Stadium: SC Vista UMT

27 January 2024 Friendly	Baník Ostrava (Czech Republic)	3–1	(Ukraine) Obolon Kyiv	Belek, Turkey
11:00				Stadium: Susesi Sport Center A

27 January 2024 Friendly	Baník Ostrava (Czech Republic)	3–2	(Slovenia) Olimpija Ljubljana	Belek, Turkey
17:30				Stadium: Titanic Sports Center - Field 1

30 January 2024 Friendly	Baník Ostrava (Czech Republic)	3–1	(Ukraine) Dynamo Kyiv	Turkey
11:00

== Competitions ==
=== Overall record ===
Competition	First match	Last match	Starting round	Final position	Record							
Competition	First match	Last match	Starting round	Final position	Pld	W	D	L	GF	GA	GD	Win %
Czech First League	23 July 2023	27 April 2024	Matchday 1	4th	35	14	7	14	56	48	+8	40.00
Czech Cup	29 August 2023	1 November 2023	Second round	Fourth round	3	2	0	1	4	2	+2	66.67
Total					38	16	7	15	60	50	+10	42.11

Source: Soccerway

=== Czech First League ===
==== Results summary ====
Overall								Home						Away					
Pld	W	D	L	GF	GA	GD	Pts	W	D	L	GF	GA	GD	W	D	L	GF	GA	GD
35	14	7	14	56	48	+8	49	6	5	6	30	17	+13	8	2	8	26	31	−5

Source: Fortuna Liga

==== Regular season ====
===== League table =====
Pos	Team	Pld	W	D	L	GF	GA	GD	Pts	Qualification or relegation
2	Slavia Prague	30	22	6	2	62	23	+39	72	Qualification for the Championship group
3	Viktoria Plzeň	30	19	5	6	67	33	+34	62	Qualification for the Championship group
4	Baník Ostrava	30	13	6	11	48	39	+9	45	Qualification for the Championship group
5	Mladá Boleslav	30	12	8	10	50	46	+4	44	Qualification for the Championship group
6	Slovácko	30	11	8	11	39	40	−1	41	Qualification for the Championship group

Source: Fortuna Liga
Rules for classification: 1) Points; 2) Head-to-head points; 3) Head-to-head goal difference; 4) Head-to-head goals scored; 5) Goal difference; 6) Goals scored; 7) Fair-play ranking; 8) Draw.

===== Results by round =====
Round	1	2	3	4	5	6	7	8	9	10	11	12	13	14	15	16	17	18	19	20	21	22	23	24	25	26	27	28	29	30
Ground	A	H	A	H	A	H	H	A	H	A	H	A	H	A	H	A	A	H	A	H	A	H	A	H	A	H	A	H	A	H
Result	L	D	L	W	L	W	W	D	W	W	D	W	L	W	L	L	W	L	L	L	W	D	W	L	W	W	W	D	L	D
Position	12	12	14	11	12	11	6	7	6	5	6	5	6	4	6	7	7	6	6	8	5	5	5	5	5	4	4	4	4	4

Source: Fortuna Liga
A = Away; H = Home; W = Win; D = Draw; L = Loss

===== Matches =====
The league fixtures were unveiled on 21 June 2023.

23 July 2023 1	Slovan Liberec	3–1	Baník Ostrava	Liberec
15:00 CEST (UTC+2)	Kpozo 19' (o.g.); Červ 41', (yellow card) 60'; Pourzitidis (yellow card) 49'; Doumbia 64'; Ghali (yellow card) 73'	Report	Almási (yellow card) 25'; Tetour (yellow card) 29', (goal) 47' (pen.); Ewerton (yellow card) 73'	Stadium: Stadion u Nisy; Attendance: 3,338; Referee: Jan Petřík

29 July 2023 2	Baník Ostrava	0–0	Slovácko	Ostrava
18:00 CEST (UTC+2)		Report		Stadium: Městský stadion Attendance: 9,016; Referee: Tomáš Klíma

6 August 2023 3	Viktoria Plzeň	3–1	Baník Ostrava	Plzeň
15:00 CEST (UTC+2)	Bucha 19'; Chorý 45+1' (pen.); Traoré 77'	Report	Šín 45+4' (pen.)	Stadium: Doosan Arena; Attendance: 10,088; Referee: Dominik Starý

12 August 2023 4	Baník Ostrava	2–0	Hradec Králové	Ostrava
15:00 CEST (UTC+2)	Buchta 90+2'; Tanko 90+6'	Report		Stadium: Městský stadion Attendance: 7,040; Referee: Vít Zaoral

20 August 2023 5	Slavia Prague	1–0	Baník Ostrava	Prague
18:00 CEST (UTC+2)	Tijani 47'	Report		Stadium: Fortuna Arena; Attendance: 19,164; Referee: Jan Všetečka

26 August 2023 6	Baník Ostrava	2–0	České Budějovice	Ostrava
18:00 CEST (UTC+2)	Tanko 64', 73'	Report		Stadium: Městský stadion Attendance: 6,458; Referee: Ondřej Pechanec

2 September 2023 7	Baník Ostrava	2–0	Mladá Boleslav	Ostrava
18:00 CEST (UTC+2)	Ewerton 49'; Karafiát 59' (o.g.)	Report		Stadium: Městský stadion Attendance: 7,218; Referee: Ondřej Berka

16 September 2023 8	Bohemians 1905	1–1	Baník Ostrava	Prague
15:00 CEST (UTC+2)	Křapka 80'	Report	Šín 87'	Stadium: Ďolíček; Attendance: 6,079; Referee: Karel Rouček

23 September 2023 9	Baník Ostrava	5–1	Zlín	Ostrava
15:00 CEST (UTC+2)	Ewerton 12'; Kubala 50', 64'; Rigo 57'; Tanko 82'	Report	Simerský 38'	Stadium: Městský stadion Attendance: 7,786; Referee: Marek Radina

30 September 2023 10	Sigma Olomouc	0–3	Baník Ostrava	Olomouc
15:00 CEST (UTC+2)		Report	Tanko 11'; Ewerton 29'; Buchta 78'	Stadium: Andrův stadion Attendance: 10,015; Referee: Ladislav Szikszay

7 October 2023 11	Baník Ostrava	1–1	Pardubice	Ostrava
18:00 CEST (UTC+2)	Ewerton 50'	Report	Daněk 42' (pen.)	Stadium: Městský stadion Attendance: 9,108; Referee: Jan Petřík

22 October 2023 12	Teplice	0–1	Baník Ostrava	Teplice
15:00 CEST (UTC+2)		Report	Almási 76'	Stadium: Na Stínadlech; Attendance: 5,378; Referee: Ondřej Pechanec

28 October 2023 13	Baník Ostrava	0–1	Jablonec	Ostrava
18:00 CEST (UTC+2)	Buchta (yellow card) 69'; Ewerton (yellow card) 79'; Fadairo (yellow card) 90'	Report	Houska (yellow card) 79'; Chramosta 84'; Polidar (yellow card) 86'; Souček (yellow card) 90'; Štěpánek (yellow card) 90+2'; Chanturishvili (yellow card) 90+4'; Hanuš (yellow card) 90+7'	Stadium: Městský stadion Attendance: 8,330; Referee: Tomáš Klíma

5 November 2023 14	Karviná	1–3	Baník Ostrava	Karviná
15:00 CET (UTC+1)	Budínský 25'	Report	Ewerton 49'; Buchta 53', 59'	Stadium: Městský stadion Attendance: 4,838; Referee: Karel Rouček

12 November 2023 15	Baník Ostrava	0–1	Sparta Prague	Ostrava
15:00 CET (UTC+1)	Ewerton (yellow card) 27'; Kubala (yellow card) 32'; Lischka (yellow card) 32'; Bernady (head of department) (yellow card) 64'; Ndefe (yellow card) 76'	Report	Kuchta (yellow card) 34'; Priske (coach) (yellow card) 45'; Panák 49'; Loučka (assistant coach) (yellow card) 64'; Jensen (yellow card) 90+9'	Stadium: Městský stadion Attendance: 15,081; Referee: Jan Petřík

26 November 2023 16	Slovácko	2–0	Baník Ostrava	Uherské Hradiště
15:00 CET (UTC+1)	Havlík 30'; Cicilia 71'	Report		Stadium: Městský fotbalový stadion Miroslava Valenty; Attendance: 6,632; Referee: Dalibor Černý

9 December 2023 18	Hradec Králové	2–3	Baník Ostrava	Hradec Králové
18:00 CET (UTC+1)	Horák 14'; Pilař 45+2' (pen.)	Report	Ewerton 7'; Tanko 82', 89'	Stadium: Malšovická aréna Attendance: 5,075; Referee: Ladislav Szikszay

17 December 2023 19	Baník Ostrava	2–3	Slavia Prague	Ostrava
15:00 CET (UTC+1)	Buchta 27'; Rigo 29'	Report	Jurečka 26'; van Buren 45+1'; Bořil 59'	Stadium: Městský stadion Attendance: 12,735; Referee: Karel Rouček

10 February 2024 20	České Budějovice	3–0	Baník Ostrava	České Budějovice
15:00 CET (UTC+1)	Šigut 56'; Králik 66'; Alli 69'	Report		Stadium: Stadion Střelecký ostrov Attendance: 2,457; Referee: Ondřej Pechanec

13 February 2024 17	Baník Ostrava	0–1	Viktoria Plzeň	Ostrava
18:00 CET (UTC+1)		Report	Cadu 90+3'	Stadium: Městský stadion Attendance: 7,717; Referee: Jan Všetečka
Note: The match was originally scheduled for 3 December 2023, but was postponed due to snow.

17 February 2024 21	Mladá Boleslav	1–3	Baník Ostrava	Mladá Boleslav
15:00 CET (UTC+1)	Fulnek 28'	Report	Rigo 17'; Adediran 42'; Ewerton 45+2'	Stadium: Lokotrans Aréna; Attendance: 3,829; Referee: Dominik Starý

24 February 2024 22	Baník Ostrava	1–1	Bohemians 1905	Ostrava
15:00 CET (UTC+1)	Buchta 32'	Report	Huf 83'	Stadium: Městský stadion Attendance: 8,419; Referee: Stanislav Volek

3 March 2024 23	Zlín	0–1	Baník Ostrava	Zlín
15:00 CET (UTC+1)		Report	Juroška 33'	Stadium: Letná Stadion; Attendance: 5,465; Referee: Dalibor Černý

9 March 2024 24	Baník Ostrava	1–2	Sigma Olomouc	Ostrava
18:00 CET (UTC+1)	Ewerton 82'	Report	Juliš 20', 37' (pen.)	Stadium: Městský stadion Attendance: 9,751; Referee: Dominik Starý

17 March 2024 25	Pardubice	0–1	Baník Ostrava	Pardubice
15:00 CET (UTC+1)		Report	Blažek 69'	Stadium: CFIG Arena; Attendance: 4,107; Referee: Ladislav Szikszay

31 March 2024 26	Baník Ostrava	4–1	Teplice	Ostrava
15:00 CEST (UTC+2)	Tanko 6'; Rusnák 22'; Ewerton 51'; Adediran 88'	Report	Audinis 76'	Stadium: Městský stadion Attendance: 9,440; Referee: Adam Trska

7 April 2024 27	Jablonec	2–3	Baník Ostrava	Jablonec nad Nisou
15:00 CEST (UTC+2)	Hollý 45+1', (yellow card) 67'; Kratochvíl (yellow card) 58'; Souček (yellow card) 68'; Černák 79'; Martinec (yellow card) 90+2'	Report	Klíma 11'; Boula (yellow card) 18'; Kpozo 24', (yellow card) 30'; Tekijaški 61' (o.g.)	Stadium: Stadion Střelnice; Attendance: 2,518; Referee: Ondřej Berka

14 April 2024 28	Baník Ostrava	2–2	Karviná	Ostrava
15:00 CEST (UTC+2)	Ewerton 19', 74' (pen.)	Report	Regáli 63'; Ražnatovič 80'	Stadium: Městský stadion Attendance: 12,296; Referee: Jan Machálek

20 April 2024 29	Sparta Prague	4–3	Baník Ostrava	Prague
15:00 CEST (UTC+2)	Birmančević 41'; Kuchta 47', 52'; Haraslín 63'	Report	Krejčí 54' (pen.); Klíma 79'; Kubala 85'	Stadium: epet ARENA; Attendance: 17,706; Referee: Dalibor Černý

28 April 2024 30	Baník Ostrava	2–2	Slovan Liberec	Ostrava
15:00 CEST (UTC+2)	Ewerton 20' (pen.); Kpozo 46'; Adediran (yellow card) 85'; Tanko (yellow card) 88'	Report	Preisler (yellow card) 34'; Tupta (yellow card) 55'; Prebsl 68'; Tetour (yellow card) 68'; Čech (goalkeeper coach) (yellow card) 88'	Stadium: Městský stadion Attendance: 10,011; Referee: Karel Rouček

==== Championship group ====
Pos	Team	Pld	W	D	L	GF	GA	GD	Pts	Qualification or relegation	SPA	SLA	PLZ	OST	MLA	SLO
1	Sparta Prague (C)	35	27	6	2	82	30	+52	87	Qualification for the Champions League second qualifying round	—	0–0	1–1	2–1	—	—
2	Slavia Prague	35	26	7	2	76	24	+52	85	Qualification for the Champions League third qualifying round (Note: Since the Europa League winners, Atalanta qualified for the Champions League via league position, Slavia Prague were promoted from the Champions League second qualifying round to the third qualifying round as one of the two teams with the highest coefficient in the second qualifying round.)	—	—	3–0	5–0	4–0	—
3	Viktoria Plzeň	35	21	7	7	76	40	+36	70	Qualification for the Europa League third qualifying round	—	—	—	1–1	3–0	4–2
4	Baník Ostrava	35	14	7	14	56	48	+8	49	Qualification for the Conference League second qualifying round	—	—	—	—	0–1	6–0
5	Mladá Boleslav (O)	35	13	8	14	51	59	−8	47	Qualification for the Conference League play-off final	0–5	—	—	—	—	0–1
6	Slovácko	35	12	8	15	45	56	−11	44		2–4	1–2	—	—	—	—

Source: Fortuna Liga
Legend: Blue = home team win; Yellow = draw; Red = away team win.
Rules for classification: 1) Total points; 2) Points earned in regular season; 3) Head-to-head points (regular season); 4) Head-to-head goal difference (regular season); 5) Head-to-head goals scored (regular season); 5) Goal difference (all matches); 6) Goals scored (all matches); 7) Fair-play ranking; 8) Draw.
(C) Champions; (O) Play-off winners

===== Results by round =====
Round	1	2	3	4	5
Ground	A	H	A	A	H
Result	L	L	L	D	W
Position	4	5	5	5	4

Source: Fortuna Liga
A = Away; H = Home; W = Win; D = Draw; L = Loss

===== Matches =====
4 May 2024 31	Slavia Prague	5–0	Baník Ostrava	Prague
18:00 CEST (UTC+2)	Schranz 28'; Chytil 48', 58'; Jurečka 55'; Jurásek 78'	Report		Stadium: Fortuna Arena; Attendance: 18,028; Referee: Ladislav Szikszay

11 May 2024 32	Baník Ostrava	0–1	Mladá Boleslav	Ostrava
15:00 CEST (UTC+2)	Helal 3'	Report		Stadium: Městský stadion Attendance: 8,627; Referee: Ondřej Berka

14 May 2024 33	Sparta Prague	2–1	Baník Ostrava	Prague
19:30 CEST (UTC+2)	Birmančević 30', 60'	Report	Frydrych 54'	Stadium: epet ARENA; Attendance: 17,057; Referee: Ondřej Pechanec

18 May 2024 34	Viktoria Plzeň	1–1	Baník Ostrava	Plzeň
17:00 CEST (UTC+2)	Vydra 49'	Report	Buchta 67'	Stadium: Doosan Arena; Attendance: 7,714; Referee: Marek Radina

26 May 2024 35	Baník Ostrava	6–0	Slovácko	Ostrava
16:00 CEST (UTC+2)	Ewerton 28' (pen.), 50'; Kubala 30', 36'; Buchta 55'; Ndefe 55'; Tanko 71'; Kpozo 80'	Report	Mihálik (red card) 26'; Šumulikoski (head of department) (yellow card) 31'; Juroška (red card) 62'	Stadium: Městský stadion Attendance: 10,190; Referee: Jan Machálek
