= 2022–23 FC Baník Ostrava season =

FC Baník Ostrava
2022–23 season
- Chairman: Václav Brabec
- Manager: Pavel Hapal
- Stadium: Městský stadion
- Czech First League: 11th
- Czech Cup: Fourth round
- Top goalscorer: League: Muhamed Tijani (11); All: Muhamed Tijani (12)

The 2022–23 season was the 101st in the history of FC Baník Ostrava and their sixth consecutive season in the top flight. The club participated in the Czech First League and the Czech Cup.

== Players ==
As of 8 September 2022.

Note: Flags indicate national team as defined under FIFA eligibility rules; some limited exceptions apply. Players may hold more than one non-FIFA nationality.

No.	Pos.	Nation	Player
3	DF	GAM	Muhammed Sanneh
5	MF	CZE	Jiří Boula
6	MF	CZE	Daniel Tetour
7	DF	CZE	Karel Pojezný
8	MF	SRB	Srđan Plavšić (on loan from Slavia Prague)
9	MF	CZE	David Buchta
10	MF	CZE	Matěj Šín
11	MF	SRB	Nemanja Kuzmanović
12	GK	CZE	Radovan Murin
13	FW	CZE	Daniel Smékal
14	MF	CZE	Petr Jaroň
16	GK	CZE	Jan Laštůvka
17	DF	CZE	Michal Frydrych
18	MF	CRO	Robert Mišković

No.	Pos.	Nation	Player
19	DF	CZE	David Lischka
21	FW	CZE	Jiří Klíma
22	MF	CZE	Filip Kaloč
23	DF	CZE	Jaroslav Svozil
24	DF	CZE	Jan Juroška
25	DF	CZE	Jiří Fleišman
26	FW	NGR	Muhamed Tijani
28	MF	BRA	Cadu (on loan from Viktoria Plzeň)
29	DF	CZE	Ladislav Takács
30	GK	CZE	Jiří Letáček (on loan from Pardubice)
33	DF	BIH	Eldar Šehić (on loan from Karviná)
77	DF	ANG	Gigli Ndefe
99	FW	SVK	Ladislav Almási

=== Out on loan ===
Note: Flags indicate national team as defined under FIFA eligibility rules; some limited exceptions apply. Players may hold more than one non-FIFA nationality.

No.	Pos.	Nation	Player
—	MF	CZE	Lukáš Budínský (at Karviná)
—	GK	SVK	Viktor Budinský (at Pardubice)
—	MF	CZE	Ondřej Chvěja (at Pardubice)
—	FW	CZE	Ondřej Šašinka (at Slovácko)

No.	Pos.	Nation	Player
—	DF	CZE	Lukáš Cienciala (at Karviná)
—	MF	CZE	Sebastian Boháč (at Karviná)
—	MF	CZE	Lukáš Kania (at Fotbal Třinec)
—	DF	CZE	Martin Chlumecký (at Pardubice)

== Pre-season and friendlies ==
Win Draw Loss Fixtures

25 June 2022 Friendly	Baník Ostrava (Czech Republic)	7–1	(Czech Republic) Kvítkovice
CEST (UTC+2)

29 June 2022 Friendly	Baník Ostrava (Czech Republic)	1–1	(Czech Republic) Zlín
CEST (UTC+2)

2 July 2022 Friendly	Baník Ostrava (Czech Republic)	0–0	(Poland) Nieciecza
CEST (UTC+2)

6 July 2022 Friendly	Líšeň (Czech Republic)	0–2	(Czech Republic) Baník Ostrava
CEST (UTC+2)

8 July 2022 Friendly	Spartak Trnava (Slovakia)	0–0	(Czech Republic) Baník Ostrava
CEST (UTC+2)

9 July 2022 Friendly	Baník Ostrava (Czech Republic)	1–3	(Slovakia) Žilina
CEST (UTC+2)

13 July 2022 Friendly	Baník Ostrava (Czech Republic)	2–4	(Scotland) Celtic	Ostrava, Czech Republic
18:00 CEST (UTC+2)	Šehić 7'; Tijani 71'		Furuhashi 13'; O'Riley 24'; Giakoumakis 48'; Abada 74'	Stadium: Městský stadion

15 July 2022 Friendly	Karmiotissa (Cyprus)	0–1	(Czech Republic) Baník Ostrava
CEST (UTC+2)

19 July 2022 Friendly	PAS Giannina (Greece)	1–1	(Czech Republic) Baník Ostrava
CEST (UTC+2)

23 July 2022 Friendly	Baník Ostrava (Czech Republic)	2–1	(Czech Republic) Karviná
CEST (UTC+2)

10 January 2023 Friendly	Skalica (Slovakia)	0–2	(Czech Republic) Baník Ostrava	Skalica, Slovakia
14:00 CET (UTC+1)				Stadium: Mestský štadión Skalica

14 January 2023 Friendly	Korona Kielce (Poland)	0–5	(Czech Republic) Baník Ostrava	Kumköy, Turkey
17:00 TRT (UTC+3)				Stadium: TSS Football Center

17 January 2023 Friendly	Vasas (Hungary)	1–0	(Czech Republic) Baník Ostrava	Belek, Turkey
18:00 TRT (UTC+3)				Stadium: Papillon Sports Centre - Field A

20 January 2023 Friendly	Cracovia (Poland)	0–2	(Czech Republic) Baník Ostrava	Belek, Turkey
13:00 TRT (UTC+3)		Report		Stadium: Susesi Sport Center B

== Competitions ==
=== Overall record ===
Competition	First match	Last match	Starting round	Final position	Record							
Competition	First match	Last match	Starting round	Final position	Pld	W	D	L	GF	GA	GD	Win %
Czech First League	30 July 2022	28 May 2023	Matchday 1	11th	35	11	9	15	53	50	+3	31.43
Czech Cup	21 September 2022	19 November 2022	Second round	Fourth round	3	1	1	1	7	6	+1	33.33
Total					38	12	10	16	60	56	+4	31.58

Source: Soccerway

=== Czech First League ===
==== Results summary ====
Overall								Home						Away					
Pld	W	D	L	GF	GA	GD	Pts	W	D	L	GF	GA	GD	W	D	L	GF	GA	GD
35	11	9	15	53	50	+3	42	8	1	9	30	28	+2	3	8	6	23	22	+1

Source: Fortuna Liga

==== Regular season ====
===== League table =====
Pos	Team	Pld	W	D	L	GF	GA	GD	Pts	Qualification or relegation
10	České Budějovice	30	10	5	15	35	54	−19	35	Qualification for the play-off
11	Jablonec	30	9	8	13	46	57	−11	35	Qualification for the relegation group
12	Baník Ostrava	30	9	8	13	43	42	+1	35	Qualification for the relegation group
13	Teplice	30	8	8	14	38	63	−25	32	Qualification for the relegation group
14	Zbrojovka Brno	30	8	7	15	40	56	−16	31	Qualification for the relegation group

Source: Fortuna Liga
Rules for classification: 1) Points; 2) Head-to-head points; 3) Head-to-head goal difference; 4) Head-to-head goals scored; 5) Goal difference; 6) Goals scored; 7) Fair-play ranking; 8) Draw.

===== Results by round =====
Round	1	2	3	4	5	6	7	8	9	10	11	12	13	14	15	16	17	18	19	20	21	22	23	24	25	26	27	28	29	30
Ground	H	A	H	H	A	H	A	H	A	H	A	H	A	H	A	H	A	A	H	A	H	A	H	A	H	A	H	A	H	A
Result	L	D	W	L	D	L	D	W	D	L	D	W	L	W	L	W	D	W	L	L	L	D	L	L	D	W	W	L	L	W
Position	16	12	9	10	11	12	14	9	11	14	14	9	12	9	12	10	10	9	9	10	11	12	12	13	13	11	9	11	11	12

Source: Fortuna Liga
A = Away; H = Home; W = Win; D = Draw; L = Loss

===== Matches =====
The league fixtures were announced on 22 June 2022.

30 July 2022 1	Baník Ostrava	0–3	Sigma Olomouc	Ostrava
16:00 CEST (UTC+2)	Kuzmanović (yellow card) 27'; Pokorný (yellow card) 32'; Fleišman (yellow card) 90'	Report	Chytil 38'; Chvátal 51', (yellow card) 76'; Sedlák 79'; Zmrzlý (yellow card) 82'	Stadium: Městský stadion Attendance: 6,698; Referee: Zbynek Proske

6 August 2022 2	Bohemians 1905	3–3	Baník Ostrava	Prague
19:00 CEST (UTC+2)	Hronek 7', (yellow card) 76'; Květ 19'; Křapka 22'; Petrák (yellow card) 80'	Report	Kuzmanović 5'; Laštůvka (yellow card) 45+2'; Klíma 49'; Sanneh (yellow card) 53'; Frydrych (yellow card) 61'; Vrba (coach) (yellow card) 73'; Tijani 79'	Stadium: Ďolíček; Attendance: 6,012; Referee: Tomáš Klíma

13 August 2022 3	Baník Ostrava	3–1	Trinity Zlín	Ostrava
16:00 CEST (UTC+2)	Frydrych 14'; Jaroň 34'; Buchta 38'; Ndefe (red card) 87'	Report	Silný (red card) 28'; Fillo (yellow card) 29'; Didiba (yellow card) 54'; Kolář 77'	Stadium: Městský stadion Attendance: 6,219; Referee: Petr Hocek

20 August 2022 4	Baník Ostrava	1–2	Teplice	Ostrava
16:00 CEST (UTC+2)	Kuzmanović 37'	Report	Knapík 19'; Gning 80'	Stadium: Městský stadion Attendance: 6,008; Referee: Jan Petřík

27 August 2022 5	Jablonec	1–1	Baník Ostrava	Jablonec nad Nisou
16:00 CEST (UTC+2)	Heidenreich (yellow card) 46'; Krob (yellow card) 54'; Chramosta 66' (pen.); Kratochvíl (yellow card) 75'; Považanec (yellow card) 90+2'	Report	Boula (yellow card) 32'; Takács (yellow card) 48'; Klíma 85'	Stadium: Stadion Střelnice; Attendance: 2,911; Referee: Miroslav Zelinka

31 August 2022 6	Baník Ostrava	1–2	Zbrojovka Brno	Ostrava
17:30 CEST (UTC+2)	Šehić (yellow card) 22'; Smékal 60'; Sanneh (yellow card) 86'; Kuzmanović (yellow card) 90+2'	Report	Ševčík (yellow card) 65'; Řezníček 83'; Fousek 90'	Stadium: Městský stadion Attendance: 7,277; Referee: Pavel Orel

4 September 2022 7	Hradec Králové	0–0	Baník Ostrava	Mladá Boleslav (Note: Hradec Králové played their home matches in Mladá Boleslav due to the rebuilding of their own Všesportovní stadion, which would finish in June 2023.)
16:00 CEST (UTC+2)		Report		Stadium: Lokotrans Aréna; Attendance: 2,022; Referee: Marek Radina

11 September 2022 8	Baník Ostrava	3–0	Pardubice	Ostrava
16:00 CEST (UTC+2)	Tetour 35' (pen.); Tijani 75'; Kuzmanović 82'	Report		Stadium: Městský stadion Attendance: 7,168; Referee: Lukáš Nehasil

17 September 2022 9	Sparta Prague	1–1	Baník Ostrava	Prague
19:00 CEST (UTC+2)	Sadílek 22'	Report	Klíma 46'	Stadium: Stadion Letná; Attendance: 15,457; Referee: Tomáš Klíma

1 October 2022 10	Baník Ostrava	1–2	České Budějovice	Ostrava
16:00 CEST (UTC+2)	Tijani 82'	Report	Hais 2'; Čmelík 50'	Stadium: Městský stadion Attendance: 6,011; Referee: Dalibor Černý

9 October 2022 11	Slovan Liberec	0–0	Baník Ostrava	Liberec
16:00 CEST (UTC+2)	Gebre Selassie (red card) 38'; P. Čvančara (fitness coach) (yellow card) 39'; Matoušek (yellow card) 44'; Červ (yellow card) 50'	Report	Cadu (yellow card) 66'; Kaloč (yellow card) 77'; Šehić (yellow card) 81'; Almási (yellow card) 90+2'	Stadium: Stadion u Nisy; Attendance: 3,858; Referee: Tomáš Batík

16 October 2022 12	Baník Ostrava	3–1	Slovácko	Ostrava
15:00 CEST (UTC+2)	Almási 6'; Plavšić 26'; Kaloč 84'	Report	Hofmann 58'	Stadium: Městský stadion Attendance: 6,860; Referee: Ondřej Berka

22 October 2022 13	Viktoria Plzeň	3–1	Baník Ostrava	Plzeň
19:00 CEST (UTC+2)	Kalvach 8'; Kliment 20'; Mosquera 78'	Report	Almási 61'	Stadium: Doosan Arena; Attendance: 9,832; Referee: Dominik Starý

29 October 2022 14	Baník Ostrava	3–1	Mladá Boleslav	Ostrava
15:00 CEST (UTC+2)	Frydrych 22'; Fleišman 52'; Almási 59'	Report	Mašek 90'	Stadium: Městský stadion Attendance: 6,232; Referee: Dalibor Černý

6 November 2022 15	Slavia Prague	3–1	Baník Ostrava	Prague
18:00 CET (UTC+1)	Kaloč 53' (o.g.); M. Jurásek 73', 79'; Douděra (yellow card) 85'; Provod (yellow card) 90+2'	Report	Kaloč (yellow card) 35'; Fleišman 58'; Cadu (yellow card) 66'	Stadium: Fortuna Arena; Attendance: 16,130; Referee: Tomáš Batík

12 November 2022 16	Baník Ostrava	4–1	Bohemians 1905	Ostrava
15:00 CET (UTC+1)	Tetour 9' (pen.); Plavšić 35'; Almási 73', 80'	Report	Kovařík 63'	Stadium: Městský Stadion; Attendance: 7,556; Referee: Michal Křepský

29 January 2023 17	Trinity Zlín	1–1	Baník Ostrava	Zlín
18:00 CET (UTC+1)	Kozák 57'	Report	Klíma 41'	Stadium: Letná Stadion; Attendance: 4,237; Referee: Ladislav Szikszay

4 February 2023 18	Teplice	0–5	Baník Ostrava	Teplice
15:00 CET (UTC+1)		Report	Klíma 51'; Cadu 63'; Kaloč 79'; Boula 83'; Lischka 90+4'	Stadium: Na Stínadlech; Attendance: 2,563; Referee: Ondřej Berka

11 February 2023 19	Baník Ostrava	1–2	Jablonec	Ostrava
15:00 CET (UTC+1)	Lischka (yellow card) 45+2'; Kuzmanović (yellow card) 64'; Tijani (yellow card) 88'; Plavšić 90+3'; Jaroň (yellow card) 90+5'	Report	Akpudje (yellow card) 21'; Klíma 29' (o.g.); Sejk 83'; Martinec (yellow card) 90+5'	Stadium: Městský stadion Attendance: 5,405; Referee: Tomáš Batík

13 February 2023 20	Zbrojovka Brno	2–1	Baník Ostrava	Brno
15:00 CEST (UTC+2)	Řezníček 9', 65'; Endl (yellow card) 56'; Berkovec (yellow card) 84'; Šural (yellow card) 90'	Report	Pojezný (yellow card) 45+1'; Plavšić (yellow card) 57'; Juroška (yellow card) 63'; Šín 80'; Fleišman (yellow card) 90+4'	Stadium: ADAX Invest Arena; Attendance: 6,814; Referee: Jan Machálek

26 February 2023 21	Baník Ostrava	0–2	Hradec Králové	Ostrava
18:00 CEST (UTC+2)		Report	Leibl 23'; Ryneš 70'	Stadium: Městský stadion Attendance: 4,271; Referee: Dominik Starý

4 March 2023 22	Pardubice	1–1	Baník Ostrava	Pardubice
15:00 CET (UTC+1)	Černý 3'	Report	Cadu 35' (pen.)	Stadium: CFIG Arena; Attendance: 4,527; Referee: Petr Hocek

11 March 2023 23	Baník Ostrava	0–3	Sparta Prague	Ostrava
15:00 CET (UTC+1)		Report	Kuchta 17'; Čvančara 20', 51'	Stadium: Městský stadion Attendance: 13,099; Referee: Pavel Orel

18 March 2023 24	České Budějovice	2–1	Baník Ostrava	České Budějovice
15:00 CET (UTC+1)	Říha 29' (o.g.); Čermák 61'	Report	Fleišman 45'	Stadium: Stadion Střelecký ostrov Attendance: 4,392; Referee: Ondřej Berka

1 April 2022 25	Baník Ostrava	0–0	Slovan Liberec	Ostrava
16:00 CEST (UTC+2)	Šehić (yellow card) 33'	Report	Preisler (yellow card) 20' (yellow-red card) 65'; Pourzitidis (yellow card) 62'; Červ (yellow card) 83'	Stadium: Městský stadion Attendance: 5,027; Referee: Dalibor Černý

8 April 2022 26	Slovácko	0–1	Baník Ostrava	Uherské Hradiště
16:00 CEST (UTC+2)		Report	Bitri 30'	Stadium: Městský fotbalový stadion Miroslava Valenty; Attendance: 6,250; Referee: Lukáš Nehasil

16 April 2022 27	Baník Ostrava	2–1	Viktoria Plzeň	Ostrava
19:00 CEST (UTC+2)	Tijani 7', 58'	Report	Hejda 79'	Stadium: Městský stadion Attendance: 7,150; Referee: Dominik Starý

22 April 2022 28	Mladá Boleslav	1–0	Baník Ostrava	Mladá Boleslav
16:00 CEST (UTC+2)	Kušej 17'	Report		Stadium: Lokotrans Aréna; Attendance: 2,621; Referee: Tomáš Klíma

25 April 2023 29	Baník Ostrava	0–2	Slavia Prague	Ostrava
19:30 CEST (UTC+2)	Fleišman (yellow card) 29'; Tijani (yellow card) 35'	Report	Zafeiris (yellow card) 33'; M. Jurásek 81', 83'	Stadium: Městský Stadion; Attendance: 9,651; Referee: Ladislav Szikszay

30 April 2023 30	Sigma Olomouc	1–4	Baník Ostrava	Olomouc
15:00 CEST (UTC+2)	Zmrzlý 45'	Report	Tijani 22', 25', 80'; Bitri 63'	Stadium: Andrův stadion Attendance: 8,946; Referee: Lukáš Nehasil

==== Relegation group ====
Pos	Team	Pld	W	D	L	GF	GA	GD	Pts	Qualification or relegation	OST	TEP	JAB	PCE	ZLN	BRN
11	Baník Ostrava	35	11	9	15	53	50	+3	42		—	2–1	—	2–4	—	4–0
12	Teplice	35	11	9	15	45	67	−22	42		—	—	—	1–0	2–1	1–1
13	Jablonec	35	10	10	15	49	63	−14	40		1–1	0–2	—	—	—	1–0
14	Pardubice (O)	35	11	4	20	38	63	−25	37	Qualification for the relegation play-offs	—	—	2–0	—	1–2	—
15	Trinity Zlín (O)	35	7	13	15	43	60	−17	34	Qualification for the relegation play-offs	2–1	—	1–1	—	—	—
16	Zbrojovka Brno (R)	35	8	9	18	41	64	−23	33	Relegation to FNL	—	—	—	0–2	0–0	—

Source: Fortuna Liga
Legend: Blue = home team win; Yellow = draw; Red = away team win.
Rules for classification: 1) Total points; 2) Points earned in regular season; 3) Head-to-head points (regular season); 4) Head-to-head goal difference (regular season); 5) Head-to-head goals scored (regular season); 5) Goal difference (all matches); 6) Goals scored (all matches); 7) Fair-play ranking; 8) Draw.
(O) Play-off winners; (R) Relegated

===== Results by round =====
Round	1	2	3	4	5
Ground	H	A	H	A	H
Result	W	D	W	L	L
Position	11	11	11	11	11

Source: Fortuna Liga
A = Away; H = Home; W = Win; D = Draw; L = Loss

===== Matches =====
6 May 2023 31	Baník Ostrava	4–0	Zbrojovka Brno	Ostrava
15:00 CEST (UTC+2)	Cadu 10'; Muhamed Tijani 32'; Plavšić 38'; Juroška 62'	Report	Granečný (yellow card) 59'; Mohamed Tijani (yellow card) 74'	Stadium: Městský stadion Attendance: 6,117; Referee: Pavel Orel

14 May 2023 32	Jablonec	1–1	Baník Ostrava	Jablonec nad Nisou
15:00 CEST (UTC+2)	Chramosta 35' (pen.); Jovović (yellow card) 79'	Report	Cadu 51'; Hapal (coach) (yellow card) 54'; Šehić (yellow card) 90+2'	Stadium: Stadion Střelnice; Attendance: 2,472; Referee: Petr Hocek

21 May 2023 33	Baník Ostrava	2–1	Teplice	Ostrava
15:00 CEST (UTC+2)	Almási 56'; Plavšić 60'	Report	Trubač 89' (pen.)	Stadium: Městský stadion Attendance: 6,195; Referee: Jan Petřík

24 May 2023 34	Trinity Zlín	2–1	Baník Ostrava	Zlín
19:00 CEST (UTC+2)	Fantiš 47'; Janetzký 87'	Report	Cadu 53'	Stadium: Letná Stadion; Attendance: 4,944; Referee: Ladislav Szikszay

28 May 2023 35	Baník Ostrava	2–4	Pardubice	Ostrava
17:00 CEST (UTC+2)	Tijani 1', 74' (pen.)	Report	Darmovzal 45', 51'; Krobot 48'; Lima 83'	Stadium: Městský stadion Attendance: 5,605; Referee: Josef Krejsa

=== Czech Cup ===
21 September 2022 Second Round	Hanácká	3–3 (1–4 p)	Baník Ostrava	Kroměříž
16:00 CET		Report		Stadium: Stadion SK Hanácká Slavia Kroměříž; Attendance: 1,425

19 October 2022 Third Round	Slovan Velvary	0–2	Baník Ostrava	Velvary
15:00 CET	Dominik Šustr (yellow card) 30'	Report	Robert Mišković (yellow card) 30' (goal) 48'; Juroška (yellow card) 74'; Daniel Smékal 84'	Stadium: Stadion TJ Slovan Velvary; Attendance: 2,100; Referee: (Czech Republic) Jan Petřík

19 November 2022 Round of 16	Baník Ostrava	2–3	Sparta Prague	Ostrava
15:00 CET	Almási (yellow card) 25'; Filip Kaloč 41' (yellow card) 53'; Nemanja Kuzmanović 90+2'	Report	Haraslín 22' (pen.) (yellow card) 52'; Pavelka (yellow card) 25'; Vorel (yellow card) 44'; Vitík (yellow card) 60'; Frydrych 66' (o.g.); Čvančara 77'; Kuchta (yellow card) 82'; Kovář (yellow card) 90+4'	Stadium: Městský stadion Attendance: 14,185; Referee: (Czech Republic) Miroslav Zelinka
