= 2024–25 FC Baník Ostrava season =

FC Baník Ostrava
2024–25 season
- Manager: Pavel Hapal
- Stadium: Městský stadion
- Czech First League: 3rd
- Czech Cup: Semi-final
- UEFA Conference League: Third qualifying round
- Average home league attendance: 10,276

The 2024–25 season is the 103rd season in the history of FC Baník Ostrava, and the 21st consecutive season in Czech First League. In addition to the domestic league, the team is scheduled to participate in the Czech Cup and the UEFA Conference League.

== Transfers ==
=== In ===
Pos.	Player	Transferred from	Fee	Date	Source
MF	(Mali) Issa Fomba	(Spain) Leganés B	Loan	16 July 2024	
GK	(Slovakia) Dominik Holec	(Czech Republic) MFK Karviná	Free	16 July 2024	

=== Out ===
Pos.	Player	Transferred to	Fee	Date	Source
MF	(Nigeria) David Fadairo	(Nigeria) Lagos Islanders	Loan return	30 June 2024	
MF	(Czech Republic) Ladislav Takács		End of contract	1 July 2024	
MF	(Czech Republic) Filip Kaloč	(Germany) 1. FC Kaiserslautern	€435,000	1 July 2024	
DF	(Slovakia) Filip Blažek	(Romania) Rapid București	€250,000	1 July 2024	
DF	(Czech Republic) Ladislav Takács	(Czech Republic) Teplice		3 July 2024	
FW	(Slovakia) Ladislav Almási	(Slovakia) DAC 1904	Loan	3 July 2024	
MF	(Croatia) Robert Mišković	(Romania) Politehnica Iași	Free	10 July 2024	
GK	(Czech Republic) Jiří Letáček	(Spain) Getafe CF	€2,000,000	13 July 2024	
DF	(Nigeria) Emmanuel Uchenna	(Czech Republic) Sparta Prague	Undisclosed	1 January 2025	

== Friendlies ==
23 June 2024 Friendly	SK Líšeň	2–2 (5–3 p)	Baník Ostrava	Brno
15:00				Stadium: Stadion SK Líšeň

26 June 2024 Friendly	Baník Ostrava	1–1	MŠK Žilina	Markvartovice
16:00	Kubala 54'		Bari 45+1'	Stadium: Fotbalové hřiště Markvartovice

29 June 2024 Friendly	Baník Ostrava	v	Piast Gliwice
14:00

29 June 2024 Friendly	Pogoń Szczecin	2–1	Baník Ostrava	Opalenica, Poland
18:00	Paryzek 5'; Bichakhchyan 34'		Rusnák 54'; (penalty missed) 62'	Stadium: Boisko Opalenica

3 July 2024 Friendly	Lech Poznań	2–0	Baník Ostrava	Opalenica, Poland
16:00	Sousa (yellow card) 16'; Antczak 50'; Ishak 71'		Juroška (yellow card) 17'	Stadium: Stadion Miejski

3 July 2024 Friendly	Dundee	3–0	Baník Ostrava	Opalenica, Poland
18:00	Graham 54'; Richardson 74'; Robertson 76'			Stadium: Stadion MKS Promien

6 July 2024 Friendly	Widzew Łódź	2–1	Baník Ostrava	Opalenica, Poland
11:00	Rondić 24' (pen.); Shehu 72'		Tanko 79'
Note: 4 x 30 minutes

13 July 2024 Friendly	Baník Ostrava	3–1	Dukla Banská Bystrica
16:00 UTC+2	Klíma 13'; Kubala 24'; Adediran 77'		Rymarenko 21'

== Competitions ==
=== Czech First League ===
==== Regular season ====
Pos	Team	Pld	W	D	L	GF	GA	GD	Pts	Qualification or relegation
1	Slavia Prague	30	25	3	2	61	11	+50	78	Qualification for the championship group
2	Viktoria Plzeň	30	20	5	5	59	28	+31	65	Qualification for the championship group
3	Baník Ostrava	30	20	4	6	52	26	+26	64	Qualification for the championship group
4	Sparta Prague	30	19	5	6	56	33	+23	62	Qualification for the championship group
5	Jablonec	30	15	6	9	47	25	+22	51	Qualification for the championship group

Source: Chance Liga
Rules for classification: 1) Points; 2) Head-to-head points; 3) Head-to-head goal difference; 4) Head-to-head goals scored; 5) Goal difference; 6) Goals scored; 7) Fair-play ranking; 8) Draw.

==== Matches ====
The match schedule was released on 20 June 2024.

Czech First League match details
Date	Opponent	Venue	Result F–A	Scorers	Attendance	Ref.
20 July 2024	Bohemians Praha 1905	A	1–2	Tanko 90+3'	5,862	
28 July 2024	FK Jablonec	H	1–0	Ewerton 53'	7,912	
11 August 2024	FC Hradec Králové	H	1–0	Uchenna 90'	8,042	
18 August 2024	1. FC Slovácko	A	0–1		6,447	
25 August 2024	Slovan Liberec	H	2–0	Prekop 48', Ewerton 54'	7,737	
28 August 2024	MFK Karviná	A	0–0		4,833	
1 September 2024	Sigma Olomouc	A	2–2	Šín 42', 50'	11,328	
21 September 2024	FK Teplice	A	3–2	Buchta 37', Pojezný 52', Ewerton 65'	3,741	
29 September 2024	Dynamo České Budějovice	H	2–1	Buchta 32', Ewerton 72'	6,545	
6 October 2024	FK Mladá Boleslav	A	0–0		2,791	
19 October 2024	Viktoria Plzeň	H	1–3	Šín 87'	10,888	
26 October 2024	FK Pardubice	A	3–2	Kubala 62', Ewerton 72' pen., Šín 90+9'	3,326	
2 November 2024	AC Sparta Praha	A	3–1	Ewerton 22' pen., 86' pen., Prekop 45+1'	17,610	
9 November 2024	FK Dukla Praha	H	6–0	Ewerton 13', 63', Buchta 16', Prekop 41', 51', Hašek 57' o.g.	8,798	
23 November 2024	FK Jablonec	A	1–3	Rigo 35'	2,863	
30 November 2024	MFK Karviná	H	2–1	Prekop 64', Ewerton 89'	9,014	
5 December 2024	Slavia Praha	H	0–1		14,659	
8 December 2024	FC Hradec Králové	A	1–0	Pojezný 84'	5,972	
14 December 2024	1. FC Slovácko	H	3–1	Prekop 2', Buchta 24' pen., Klíma 90'	6,855	
1 February 2025	Slovan Liberec	A	1–0	Ewerton 1'	3,308	
9 February 2025	Sigma Olomouc	H	1–0	Buchta 31'	10,039	
16 February 2025	Slavia Praha	A	0–1		18,105	
22 February 2025	FK Teplice	H	2–0	Kubala 77', 85'	7,228	
1 March 2025	Dynamo České Budějovice	A	4–0	Šín 13', Prekop 45', Kubala 68', Brabec 81 o.g.	4,476	
9 March 2025	FK Mladá Boleslav	H	2–1	Kubala 31', Kohút 35'	11,562	
16 March 2025	Viktoria Plzeň	A	1–0	Prekop 23'	11,037	
29 March 2025	FK Pardubice	H	5–2	Šín 17', Kubala 34', Ewerton 67', Zlatohlávek 84', Owusu 90+1'	11,792	
5 April 2025	AC Sparta Praha	H	1–1	Šín 33'	15,080	
12 April 2025	FK Dukla Praha	A	2–1	Boula 20', Frydrych 90+1'	5,086	
19 April 2025	Bohemians Praha 1905	H	1–0	Hůlka 45' o.g.	14,385	

==== Championship round ====
Pos	Team	Pld	W	D	L	GF	GA	GD	Pts	Qualification or relegation
1	Slavia Prague (C)	35	29	3	3	77	18	+59	90	Qualification for the Champions League league phase
2	Viktoria Plzeň	35	23	5	7	71	36	+35	74	Qualification for the Champions League second qualifying round
3	Baník Ostrava	35	22	5	8	58	34	+24	71	Qualification for the Europa League second qualifying round
4	Sparta Prague	35	19	6	10	61	44	+17	63	Qualification for the Conference League second qualifying round
5	Jablonec	35	19	6	10	60	33	+27	63	
6	Sigma Olomouc	35	12	9	14	48	53	−5	45	Qualification for the Europa League play-off round (Note: The winner of the 2024–25 Czech Cup (Sigma Olomouc) qualifies for the Europa League play-off round.)

Source: Chance Liga
Rules for classification: 1) Total points; 2) Points earned in regular season; 3) Head-to-head points (regular season); 4) Head-to-head goal difference (regular season); 5) Head-to-head goals scored (regular season); 5) Goal difference (all matches); 6) Goals scored (all matches); 7) Fair-play ranking; 8) Draw.
(C) Champions
Notes:

Czech First League championship round match details
Date	Opponent	Venue	Result F–A	Scorers	Attendance	Ref.
27 April 2025	FK Jablonec	H	1–2	Ewerton 59'	10,269	
3 May 2025	Sigma Olomouc	H	0–0		9,512	
11 May 2025	Viktoria Plzeň	A	2–1	Buchta 59', Owusu 64'	11,134	
18 May 2025	AC Sparta Praha	H	3–2	Šín 1', Lischka 7', Kohút 32'	14,645	
24 May 2025	Slavia Praha	A	0–3		19,322	

=== Czech Cup ===
Czech Cup match details
Round	Date	Opponent	Venue	Result F–A	Scorers	Attendance	Ref.
Third round	30 October 2024	FK Varnsdorf	A	3–1	Buchta 6' pen., Ewerton 80', Kubala 89'	840	
Round of 16	5 March 2025	FK Pardubice	A	2–0	Šín 23', Kohút 41'	2,268	
Quarter-finals	9 April 2025	FK Jablonec	A	1–0	Rigo 64'	2,962	
Semi-finals	22 April 2025	Sigma Olomouc	H	2–3	Šín 24', Rigo 57'	12,039	

=== UEFA Conference League ===
UEFA Conference League match details
Round	Date	Opponent	Venue	Result F–A	Scorers	Attendance	Ref.
Second qualifying round, first leg	25 July 2024	FC Urartu	H	5–1	Ewerton 15', Boula 22', Buchta 26', Prekop 62', Klíma 82'	13,553	
Second qualifying round, second leg	1 August 2024	FC Urartu	A	2–0	Ewerton 22', Chaluš 51'	1,700	
Third qualifying round, first leg	7 August 2024	FC København	A	0–1		16,513	
Third qualifying round, second leg	15 August 2024	FC København	H	1–0 (1–2 p)	Prekop 42'	14,458	
