= Jakub Pokorný =

Czech footballer (born 1996)

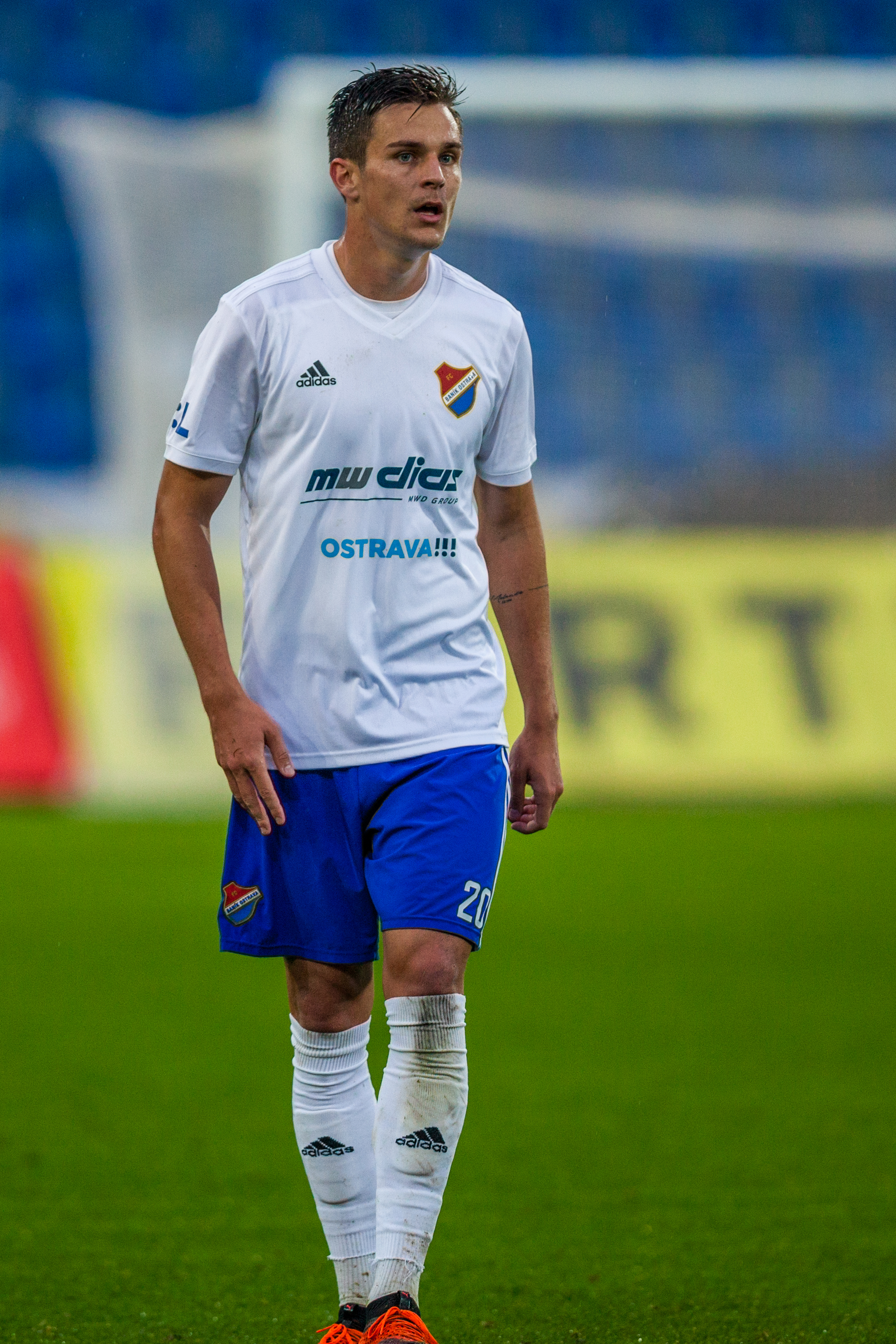

Personal information
- Date of birth: 11 September 1996 (age 30)
- Place of birth: Znojmo, Czech Republic
- Height: 1.86 m (6 ft 1 in)
- Position: Defender

Team information
- Current team: Zbrojovka Brno
- Number: 38

Youth career
- Znojmo

Senior career*
Years	Team	Apps	(Gls)
2014–2016	Znojmo	13	(2)
2016–2022	Baník Ostrava	71	(3)
2018	→ Ústí nad Labem (loan)	12	(1)
2018–2019	→ Hradec Králové (loan)	15	(1)
2022–2025	Sigma Olomouc	80	(8)
2025–2026	A.E. Kifisia	29	(2)
2026–	Zbrojovka Brno	0	(0)

International career^{‡}
2016–2017	Czech Republic U20	4	(0)
2017	Czech Republic U21	3	(0)
- * Club domestic league appearances and goals as of 14 June 2026 ‡ National team caps and goals as of 19 September 2017

Jakub Pokorný (born 11 September 1996) is a Czech professional footballer who plays as a defender for Zbrojovka Brno in the Czech First League.

== Club career ==
He started his professional career at Znojmo. He made his senior league debut for them on 28 September 2014 in their Czech National Football League 4–1 loss at Varnsdorf. He scored his first league goal on 27 March 2016 in Znojmo's Czech National Football League 3–1 loss at Hradec Králové. He moved to Baník Ostrava in 2016 and won promotion to the Czech First League with them the same season. On 30 August 2022, Pokorný joined Sigma Olomouc on a three-year contract.

On 26 July 2025, Pokorný signed a two-year contract with Super League Greece club A.E. Kifisia.

On 26 August 2026, Pokorný signed a multi-year contract with Czech First League club Zbrojovka Brno.

== International career ==
He represented the Czech Republic in the Under-20 and Under-21 youth categories.

== Honours ==
Sigma Olomouc

- Czech Cup: 2024–25

== Career statistics ==
=== Club ===
As of 6 April 2026

Appearances and goals by club, season and competition
Club	Season	League			National cup (Note: Includes Czech Cup, Greek Cup)		Continental		Other		Total	
Club	Season	Division	Apps	Goals	Apps	Goals	Apps	Goals	Apps	Goals	Apps	Goals
Znojmo	2014–15	Czech FNL	2	0	1	0	—		—		3	0
Znojmo	2015–16	Czech FNL	11	2	0	0	—		—		11	2
Znojmo	Total		13	2	1	0	0	0	0	0	14	2
Baník Ostrava	2016–17	Czech FNL	19	0	2	0	—		—		21	0
Baník Ostrava	2017–18	Czech First League	13	0	3	0	—		—		16	0
Baník Ostrava	2018–19	Czech First League	2	0	—		—		—		2	0
Baník Ostrava	2019–20	Czech First League	19	3	4	1	—		3 (Note: Appearance(s) in Czech First League Championship group)	0	26	4
Baník Ostrava	2020–21	Czech First League	30	1	2	2	—		—		32	3
Baník Ostrava	2021–22	Czech First League	15	2	3	0	—		5	0	23	2
Baník Ostrava	2022–23	Czech First League	4	0	—		—		—		4	0
Baník Ostrava	Total		102	6	12	3	0	0	8	0	122	9
Ústí nad Labem (loan)	2017–18	Czech FNL	12	1	—		—		—		21	0
Hradec Králové (loan)	2018–19	Czech FNL	15	1	1	0	—		—		16	1
Sigma Olomouc	2022–23	Czech First League	22	2	2	0	—		5	0	29	2
Sigma Olomouc	2023–24	Czech First League	24	4	3	0	—		2 (Note: Appearance(s) in Czech First League European playoffs)	0	29	4
Sigma Olomouc	2024–25	Czech First League	27	2	3	0	—		—		30	2
Sigma Olomouc	Total		73	8	9	0	0	0	7	0	88	8
Kifisia F.C.	2025–26	Super League Greece	21	2	2	0	—		1 (Note: Appearance(s) in Super League Greece Play-out)	0	24	2
Career total			236	20	25	3	0	0	16	0	277	23
