= Erik Prekop =

Slovak footballer (born 1997)

Personal information
- Date of birth: 8 October 1997 (age 29)
- Place of birth: Trenčín, Slovakia
- Height: 1.85 m (6 ft 1 in)
- Position: Forward

Team information
- Current team: Górnik Zabrze
- Number: 11

Youth career
- 2005–2016: AS Trenčín

Senior career*
Years	Team	Apps	(Gls)
2016–2019	AS Trenčín	12	(0)
2017	→ Slovan Nemšová (loan)		
2017–2018	→ Inter Bratislava (loan)	23	(8)
2018–2019	→ Petržalka (loan)	26	(13)
2019–2022	Hradec Králové	80	(14)
2022–2024	Bohemians 1905	55	(13)
2024–2025	Baník Ostrava	37	(9)
2025–2026	Slavia Prague	19	(1)
2026–	Górnik Zabrze	14	(2)

International career^{‡}
2025–	Slovakia	5	(1)
- * Club domestic league appearances and goals as of 15:37, 9 November 2026 (UTC) ‡ National team caps and goals as of 18:18, 16 November 2026 (UTC)

Erik Prekop (born 8 October 1997) is a Slovak professional footballer who plays as a forward for Ekstraklasa club Górnik Zabrze and the Slovakia national team.

Prekop started his career at AS Trenčín, from where he had various loan spells. In 2019, he moved to the Czech Republic, playing with Hradec Králové, Bohemians 1905 and Baník Ostrava, before signing with Slavia Prague in 2025. A year later, Prekop moved to Polish club Górnik Zabrze. He made his debut for the Slovakia national team in 2025.

== Club career ==
Prekop made his professional Fortuna Liga debut for AS Trenčín against Zemplín Michalovce on 16 July 2016. Trenčín lost the away game 2:1. Prekop came on in the 65th minute, replacing Denis Jančo. While at Trenčín, Prekop played in the qualifying stages of the UEFA Champions League and UEFA Europa League. He later played on loan at Petržalka in the Slovak second tier.

Prekop signed for Czech side Hradec Králové in July 2019. He scored six goals in the Czech Cup in the 2021–22 season, but was goalless in 25 league matches for his club. After making just five appearances in the 2022–23 season, all as a substitute, he left Hradec to sign for Prague-based Bohemians 1905 in September 2022. Having been Bohemians' top scorer in the 2023–24 season, Baník Ostrava signed Prekop in June 2024. Prekop signed for Slavia Prague in September 2025 on a three-year contract. He made his debut for Slavia in September 2025 in a 3–1 win against MFK Karviná.

On 17 June 2026, Prekop signed a three-year contract with Polish Ekstraklasa club Górnik Zabrze.

== International career ==
In December 2022, Prekop was first recognised in a Slovak senior national team nomination and was immediately shortlisted by Francesco Calzona for prospective players' training camp at NTC Senec. He made his national team debut in 2025 in a friendly match against Greece.

== Career statistics ==
=== Club ===
As of match played 7 November 2026

Appearances and goals by club, season and competition
Club	Season	League			National cup (Note: Includes Slovak Cup, Czech Cup, Polish Cup)		Europe		Other		Total	
Club	Season	Division	Apps	Goals	Apps	Goals	Apps	Goals	Apps	Goals	Apps	Goals
AS Trenčín	2016–17	Slovak First Football League	12	0	0	0	4 (Note: Two appearances in UEFA Champions League, two appearances in UEFA Europa League)	0	—		16	0
Inter Bratislava (loan)	2017–18	2. Liga	23	8	3	1	—		—		26	9
Petržalka (loan)	2018–19	2. Liga	26	13	0	0	—		—		26	13
Hradec Králové	2019–20	Czech National Football League	25	6	—		—		—		25	6
Hradec Králové	2020–21	Czech National Football League	25	8	3	0	—		—		28	8
Hradec Králové	2021–22	Czech First League	25	0	5	5	—		—		30	5
Hradec Králové	2022–23	Czech First League	5	0	0	0	—		—		5	0
Hradec Králové	Total		80	14	8	5	—		—		88	19
Bohemians 1905	2022–23	Czech First League	24	5	5	1	—		—		29	6
Bohemians 1905	2023–24	Czech First League	31	8	0	0	2 (Note: Appearances in UEFA Conference League)	0	—		33	8
Bohemians 1905	Total		55	13	5	1	2	0	—		62	14
Baník Ostrava	2024–25	Czech First League	32	8	4	0	4	2	—		40	8
Baník Ostrava	2025–26	Czech First League	5	1	0	0	6 (Note: Two appearances and one goal in UEFA Europa League, four appearances and two goals in UEFA Conference League)	3	—		11	4
Baník Ostrava	Total		37	9	4	0	10	5	—		51	14
Slavia Prague	2025–26	Czech First League	19	1	2	0	3 (Note: Appearances in UEFA Champions League)	0	—		24	1
Górnik Zabrze	2026–27	Ekstraklasa	14	2	1	0	5 (Note: Two appearances in UEFA Champions League, two appearances in UEFA Europa League, one appearance and one goal in UEFA Conference League)	1	1 (Note: Appearance in Polish Super Cup)	0	21	3
Career total			266	52	23	7	20	6	1	0	310	65

=== International ===
As of match played 16 November 2026

Appearances and goals by national team and year
National team	Year	Apps	Goals
Slovakia	2025	1	0
Slovakia	2026	4	1
Total		5	1

Scores and results list Slovakia's goal tally first, score column indicates score after each Prekop goal.

List of international goals scored by Erik Prekop
No.	Date	Venue	Opponent	Score	Result	Competition
1	13 November 2026	Košická futbalová aréna, Košice, Slovakia	Faroe Islands	1–0	2–2	2026–27 UEFA Nations League C

== Honours ==
Slavia Prague

- Czech First League: 2025–26
