= Emmanuel Uchenna =

Nigerian footballer (born 2003)

Personal information
- Full name: Emmanuel Uchenna Aririerisim
- Date of birth: 4 December 2003 (age 22)
- Position: Centre-back

Team information
- Current team: Sparta Prague
- Number: 16

Senior career*
Years	Team	Apps	(Gls)
-2022	Ikorodu City		
2022–2025	Baník Ostrava	29	(2)
2023	→ Vítkovice (loan)	4	(0)
2023–2024	→ Hlučín (loan)	10	(0)
2025–	Sparta Prague	26	(2)
- * Club domestic league appearances and goals as of 14:38, 28 August 2026 (UTC)

Emmanuel Uchenna Aririerisim (born 4 December 2003) is a Nigerian professional footballer who plays as a central defender for Czech club Sparta Prague.

== Career ==
Uchenna played in Lagos, Nigeria, for Ikorodu City in 2022 prior to moving to Czech club Baník Ostrava. He also had loan spells in the Czech Republic in 2023 with Vítkovice, and later Hlučín.

Uchenna signed for fellow Czech club Sparta Prague in the 2024-25 winter transfer window. He made his debut for the club in January 2025. In the 2025-26 season he also played for the club as they reaches the round-of-16 in the UEFA Conference League.
