= David Fadairo =

Nigerian footballer

Personal information
- Full name: David Adeniyi Fadairo
- Date of birth: 7 November 2000 (age 26)
- Place of birth: Lagos, Nigeria
- Height: 1.77 m (5 ft 10 in)
- Position: Winger

Team information
- Current team: Partizani
- Number: 33

Senior career*
Years	Team	Apps	(Gls)
–2020	Lagos Islanders		
2019	→ Podbrezová (loan)	2	(0)
2020	Rimavská Sobota		
2021	SV Stripfing		
2021–2022	Alki Oroklini		
2022–2023	Rimavská Sobota		
2023	→ Liptovský Mikuláš (loan)	4	(0)
2023	Lagos Islanders	0	(0)
2023–2024	→ Baník Ostrava (loan)	3	(0)
2024–2025	Tatran Prešov	25	(5)
2025–2026	Teuta Durrës	19	(0)
2026–	Partizani	6	(0)
- * Club domestic league appearances and goals as of 13 May 2026

David Fadairo (born 7 November 2000) is a Nigerian footballer who plays for Albanian club Partizani as a winger.

== Club career ==
Fadairo made his Slovak Super Liga professional debut for FK Železiarne Podbrezová on 9 March 2019 in a game against MŠK Žilina.
