= Jaroslav Svozil =

Czech footballer (born 1993)

Personal information
- Date of birth: 9 September 1993 (age 33)
- Place of birth: Czech Republic
- Height: 1.83 m (6 ft 0 in)
- Position: Defender

Team information
- Current team: Dukla Prague
- Number: 23

Senior career*
Years	Team	Apps	(Gls)
2013–2018	Sigma Olomouc	7	(0)
2015–2018	→ Znojmo (loan)	12	(0)
2018–2020	Opava	48	(1)
2020–2023	Baník Ostrava	61	(4)
2023–2025	Karviná	39	(1)
2025–	Dukla Prague	33	(0)

International career^{‡}
2013	Czech Republic U20	2	(0)
2013	Czech Republic U21	1	(0)
- * Club domestic league appearances and goals as of 15 May 2026 ‡ National team caps and goals as of 15 June 2020

Jaroslav Svozil (born 9 September 1993) is a Czech professional footballer who plays for Dukla Prague in the Czech First League.
