= Viktor Budinský =

Slovak footballer

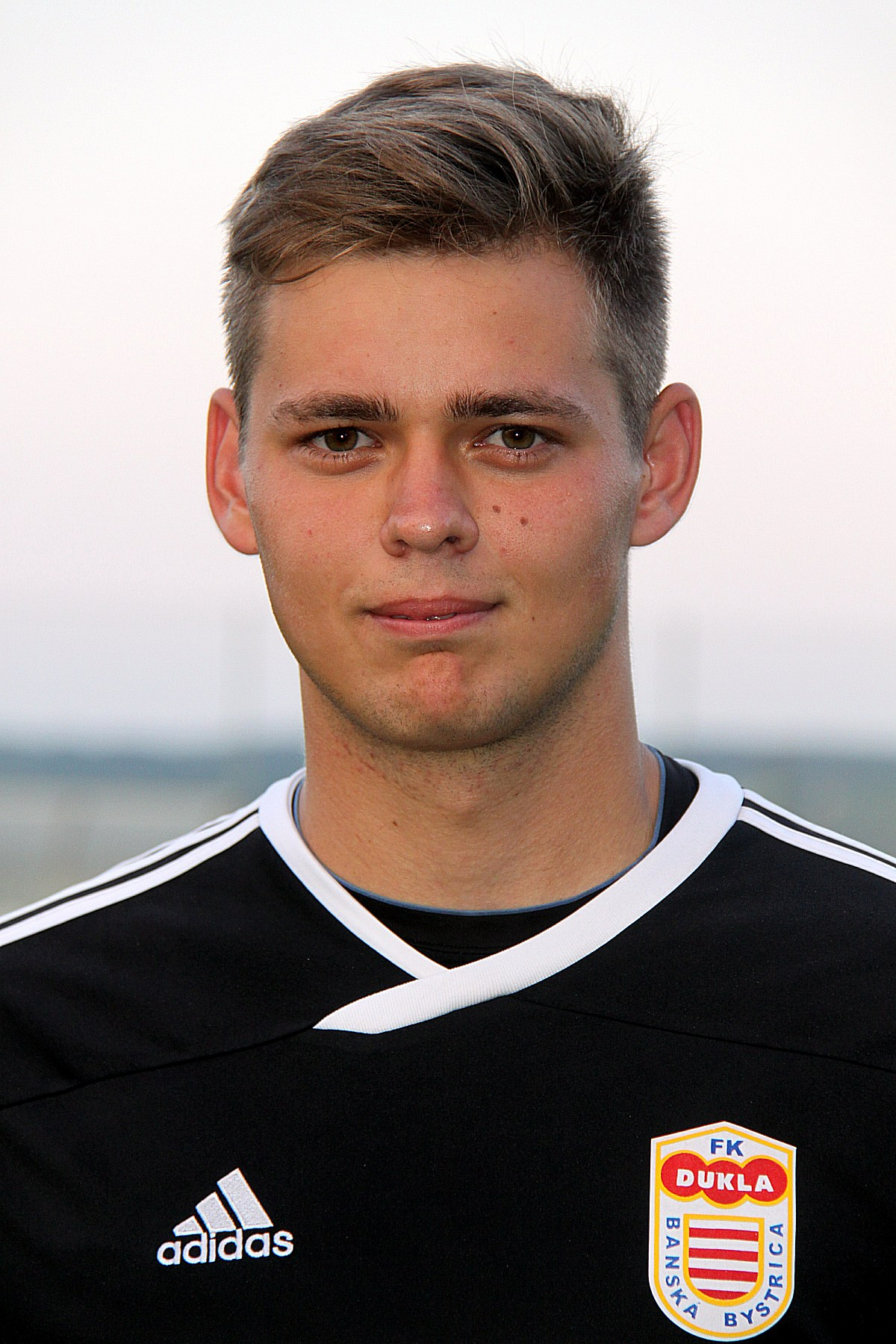

Personal information
- Full name: Viktor Budinský
- Date of birth: 9 May 1993 (age 33)
- Place of birth: Banská Štiavnica, Slovakia
- Height: 1.87 m (6 ft 2 in)
- Position: Goalkeeper

Team information
- Current team: Baník Ostrava
- Number: 1

Youth career
- Dukla Banská Bystrica

Senior career*
Years	Team	Apps	(Gls)
2012–2015	Dukla Banská Bystrica	9	(0)
2015–2016	FC Vlašim	31	(0)
2016–2018	Sparta Prague	0	(0)
2016	→ Bohemians 1905 (loan)	13	(0)
2017–2018	→ Bohemians 1905 (loan)	0	(0)
2018–2023	Baník Ostrava	26	(0)
2022–2023	→ FK Pardubice (loan)	3	(0)
2023–2025	Pardubice	23	(0)
2025	→ Zemplín Michalovce (loan)	9	(0)
2025–	Baník Ostrava	4	(0)
- * Club domestic league appearances and goals as of 5 February 2026

Viktor Budinský (born 9 May 1993) is a Slovak professional footballer who plays as a goalkeeper for FC Baník Ostrava. He previously played for Sparta Prague.

== FK Dukla Banská Bystrica ==
Budinský made his official debut for FK Dukla Banská Bystrica on 20 May 2011, playing full-time in a 0–2 away loss against MFK Ružomberok.
