= David Houska =

Czech footballer

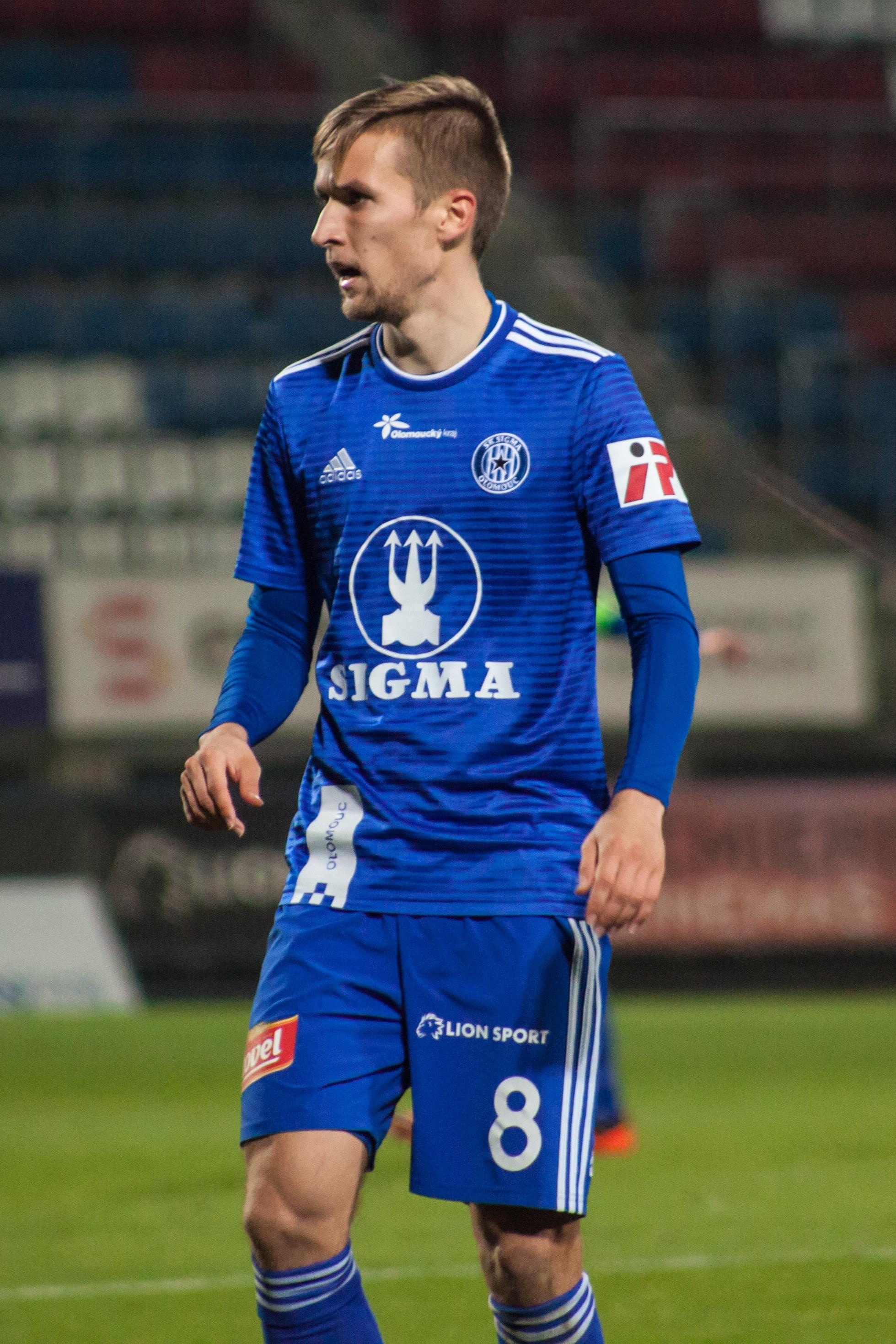
- David Houska with Sigma Olomouc

Personal information
- Date of birth: 29 June 1993 (age 33)
- Place of birth: Czech Republic
- Height: 1.76 m (5 ft 9 1/2 in)
- Position: Midfielder

Team information
- Current team: FK Jablonec
- Number: 8

Senior career*
Years	Team	Apps	(Gls)
2013–2021	Olomouc	186	(21)
2021–	FK Jablonec	57	(1)

International career^{‡}
2010–2011	Czech Republic U18	9	(1)
2011–2012	Czech Republic U19	12	(1)
2013–2015	Czech Republic U21	10	(0)
2017	Czech Republic	1	(0)
- * Club domestic league appearances and goals as of 21 January 2024 ‡ National team caps and goals as of 28 July 2022

David Houska (born 29 June 1993) is a Czech footballer who currently plays for FK Jablonec as a midfielder. He has played in the Czech First League.
