= Nemanja Kuzmanović =

Serbian footballer (born 1989)

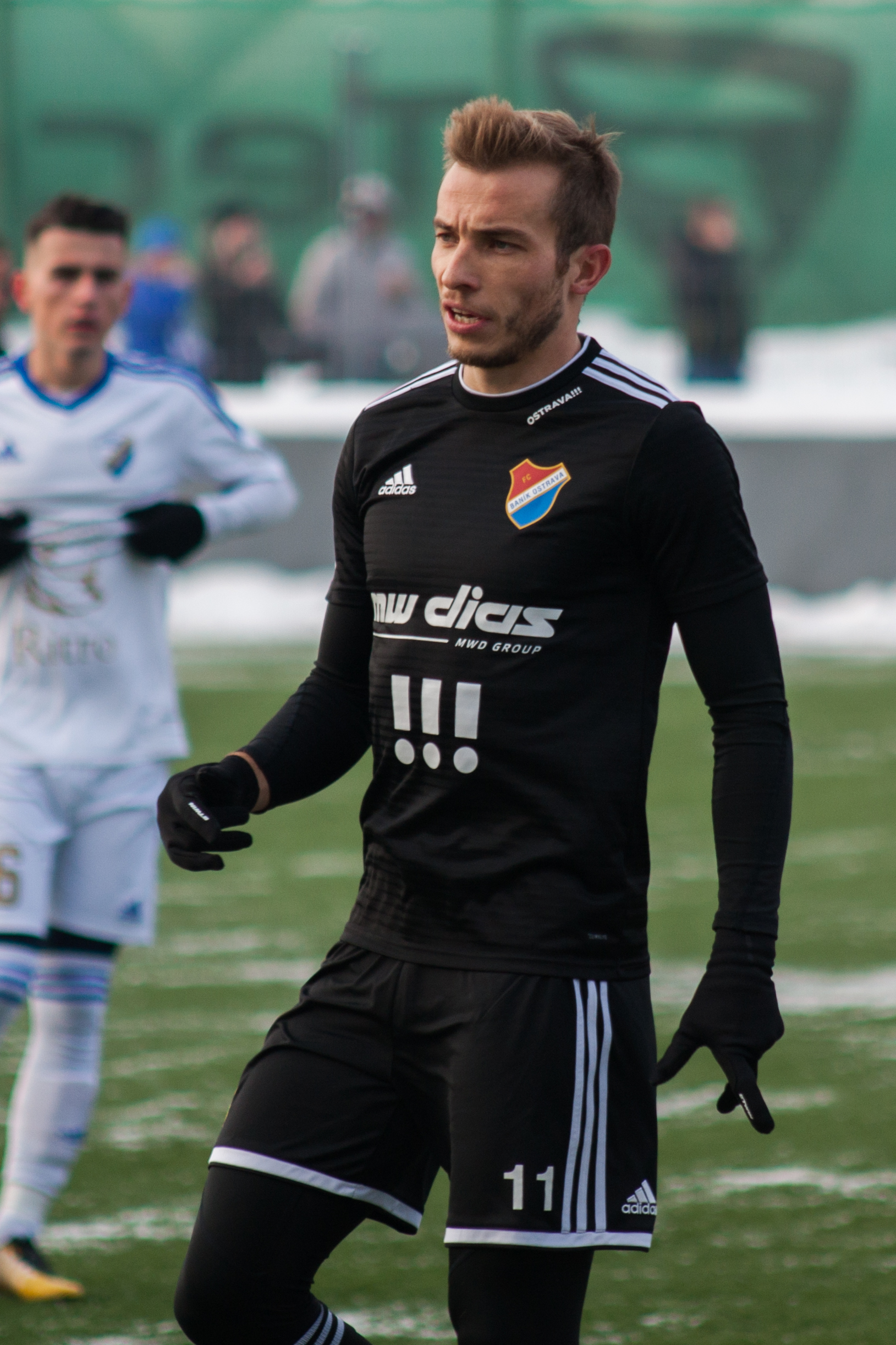
- Kuzmanović in 2019

Personal information
- Date of birth: 27 May 1989 (age 37)
- Place of birth: Šabac, Yugoslavia
- Height: 1.80 m (5 ft 11 in)
- Position: Midfielder

Team information
- Current team: MFK Havířov
- Number: 8

Youth career
- Novi Sad 1921

Senior career*
Years	Team	Apps	(Gls)
2010	Slovan HAC	13	(3)
2010-2012	Leobendorf SV	53	(18)
2012–2014	Bohemians Střížkov	41	(6)
2014	→ Baník Sokolov (loan)	14	(3)
2014–2018	Opava	129	(46)
2019–2023	Baník Ostrava	142	(24)
2023–2024	Nea Salamis Famagusta	22	(1)
Total		434	(101)
- * Club domestic league appearances and goals as of 21 May 2024

Nemanja Kuzmanović (born 27 May 1989) is a Serbian professional footballer who plays as a midfielder.

== Club career ==
Kuzmanović was born in Šabac, Yugoslavia. He started playing senior football at lower amateur competitions in Serbia, Romania and Austria. His first professional engagement was with Bohemians Střížkov in the Czech National Football League, where he arrived in 2012. Before the 2014–15 season, he transferred to SFC Opava. He played regularly at the club for the next 4 1/2 seasons and worked his way up to the position of team captain. In the 2017–18 season, he became the second top scorer of the competition with 18 goals and helped his team to promote to the Czech First League.

At the beginning of 2019, he transferred to a regional rival team, Baník Ostrava in the Czech First League. In the following seasons, he played 142 league matches for Ostrava and became one of the top scorers in the modern history of the club with 24 league goals. In 2023, Baník Ostrava decided not to extend Kuzmanović's contract, so he transferred to the Cyprian club Nea Salamis Famagusta.

In July 2024, Kuzmanović returned to the Czech Republic and signed with MFK Havířov, playing in the amateur competition of Czech Fourth Division (4th tier).
