= Abdullahi Tanko =

Nigerian footballer (born 1998)

Personal information
- Date of birth: 12 May 1998 (age 28)
- Place of birth: Nigeria
- Height: 1.71 m (5 ft 7 in)
- Position: Striker

Team information
- Current team: Pardubice
- Number: 28

Youth career
- –2016: Team360 FC

Senior career*
Years	Team	Apps	(Gls)
2016–2018	Vila Real		
2018–2019	Gil Vicente	27	(8)
2019–2020	Chaves B	22	(7)
2020–2021	Valadares Gaia	20	(6)
2021–2022	Salgueiros	26	(0)
2022–2023	Varnsdorf	30	(15)
2023–2025	Baník Ostrava	42	(10)
2025–	Pardubice	45	(8)
- * Club domestic league appearances and goals as of 27 May 2026

Abdullahi Tanko (born 12 May 1998) is a Nigerian professional footballer who plays as a striker for Pardubice.

== Personal life ==
Tanko was born in 1998 in Nigeria. He has regarded Nigeria international Victor Boniface as his football idol. Tanko's father was a soldier. He has four siblings.

== Career ==
In 2022, Tanko signed for Czech side Varnsdorf. In 2023, he signed for Baník Ostrava.

On 18 January 2025, he signed a multi-year contract with Pardubice.

He mainly operates as a striker. He is known for his speed.
