= Gigli Ndefe =

Angolan footballer

Personal information
- Full name: Gigli Nsungani Ndefe
- Date of birth: 2 March 1994 (age 32)
- Place of birth: Weert, Netherlands
- Height: 1.80 m (5 ft 11 in)
- Position: Right-back

Team information
- Current team: Slovácko
- Number: 2

Youth career
- Asse-Zellik
- Lebeke-Aalst
- Eendracht Aalst

Senior career*
Years	Team	Apps	(Gls)
2011–2015	Eendracht Aalst	9	(0)
2013–2014	→ FC Oss (loan)	5	(0)
2015–2019	RKC Waalwijk	114	(0)
2019–2021	Karviná	44	(1)
2021–2024	Baník Ostrava	89	(1)
2023	→ Slovan Liberec (loan)	11	(0)
2024–	Slovácko	65	(2)

International career^{‡}
2022–	Angola	4	(0)
- * Club domestic league appearances and goals as of 25 May 2026 ‡ National team caps and goals as of 13 October 2023

Gigli Nsungani Ndefe (born 2 March 1994) is a professional footballer who plays as a right-back for Slovácko. Born in the Netherlands, he plays for the Angola national team.

== Club career ==
Ndefe formerly played for Eendracht Aalst, RKC Waalwijk and MFK Karviná. Besides the Netherlands, he has played in the Czech Republic. On 2 July 2019, he joined Czech club Karviná on a 2-year contract.

On 13 January 2021, Ndefe signed with Czech club Baník Ostrava on a two-year contract.

He joined Slovan Liberec on loan until the end of the season on 15 February 2023.

On 10 July 2024, Ndefe signed a contract with Slovácko until summer 2026.

== International career ==
Born in the Netherlands, Ndefe is of Angolan descent. He debuted for the Angola national team in a 2–1 2023 Africa Cup of Nations qualification win over Central African Republic on 1 June 2022.
