= Filip Kubala =

Czech footballer

Personal information
- Full name: Filip Kubala
- Date of birth: 2 September 1999 (age 27)
- Place of birth: Třinec, Czech Republic
- Height: 1.80 m (5 ft 11 in)
- Position: Forward

Team information
- Current team: Baník Ostrava
- Number: 28

Youth career
- Slovácko

Senior career*
Years	Team	Apps	(Gls)
2015–2022	Slovácko	46	(4)
2019	→ Viktoria Žižkov (loan)	14	(3)
2020	→ Karviná (loan)	3	(0)
2021–2022	→ Hradec Králové (loan)	30	(5)
2022–2023	Hradec Králové	27	(7)
2023–	Baník Ostrava	62	(11)

International career
2014–2015	Czech Republic U16	15	(4)
2015–2016	Czech Republic U17	13	(4)
2016–2017	Czech Republic U18	6	(2)
2017	Czech Republic U19	2	(0)
- * Club domestic league appearances and goals as of 17 June 2025

Filip Kubala (born 2 September 1999) is a Czech footballer who plays as a forward for Baník Ostrava.

On 6 July 2023 Kubala signed a four-year contract with option with Baník Ostrava.
