= Matěj Šín =

Czech footballer (born 2004)

Personal information
- Date of birth: 2 June 2004 (age 22)
- Place of birth: Ostrava, Czech Republic
- Height: 1.80 m (5 ft 11 in)
- Position: Midfielder

Team information
- Current team: ADO Den Haag (on loan from AZ)
- Number: 33

Youth career
- 2011–2013: Polanka
- 2013–2014: Vítkovice
- 2014–2022: Baník Ostrava

Senior career*
Years	Team	Apps	(Gls)
2022	Baník Ostrava	5	(0)
2022	→ Baník Ostrava B	8	(2)
2023–2025	Baník Ostrava	82	(11)
2025–	AZ	18	(1)
2025–	Jong AZ	5	(1)
2026–	→ ADO Den Haag (loan)	5	(1)

International career^{‡}
2019	Czech Republic U16	2	(1)
2021–2022	Czech Republic U18	11	(0)
2023	Czech Republic U19	3	(2)
2023	Czech Republic U20	5	(0)
2024–	Czech Republic U21	7	(1)
2025–	Czech Republic	1	(0)
- * Club domestic league appearances and goals as of 24 October 2026 ‡ National team caps and goals as of 4 June 2025

Matěj Šín (born 2 June 2004) is a Czech professional footballer who plays as a midfielder for Eredivisie club ADO Den Haag on loan from AZ and the Czech Republic national team.

== Club career ==
Šín started his career at local side Polanka, and spent a season with Vítkovice before joining Baník Ostrava in 2014.

In June 2022, shortly after his eighteenth birthday, Šín was diagnosed with testicular cancer, and immediately underwent surgery. He had featured for the first team and reserves of Baník Ostrava at the time, having made his debut at the age of seventeen, but had to put his career on hold as he underwent post-operative treatment, and was unable to partake in any strenuous activity, such as football.

In October 2022, it was announced that Šín had overcome the cancer and begun training individually, hoping to return to his former club Baník Ostrava. The same month, he sent a message of support to compatriot Matěj Pinkas, an ice hockey player of the same age who was also suffering from cancer at the time.

Šín returned to first team training with Baník Ostrava in January 2023. The following month, he scored his first goal for the club, though it was a consolation goal in a 2–1 away loss against Zbrojovka Brno. Just over a week later, he signed a professional contract with the club, keeping him with Baník Ostrava until June 2025.

On 29 August 2025, Šín signed a five-year contract with Eredivisie club AZ.

On 31 August 2026, Šín joined ADO Den Haag on a one-year loan deal without an option to make the transfer permanent.

== International career ==
Šín has represented the Czech Republic at youth levels ranging from under-16 until under-20. On 23 March 2025, he debuted for the Czech senior squad in a 2026 FIFA World Cup qualification against Faroe Islands, ending in a 2–1 victory for the Czechs.

== Career statistics ==
=== Club ===
As of 24 October 2026

Appearances and goals by club, season and competition
Club	Season	League			Cup (Note: Includes Czech Cup)		Continental		Other		Total	
Club	Season	Division	Apps	Goals	Apps	Goals	Apps	Goals	Apps	Goals	Apps	Goals
Baník Ostrava	2021–22	Czech First League	5	0	0	0	–		0	0	5	0
Baník Ostrava B	2021–22	MSFL	8	2	–		–		0	0	8	2
Baník Ostrava	2022–23	Czech First League	11	1	0	0	–		0	0	11	1
Baník Ostrava	2023–24	Czech First League	34	2	2	0	–		0	0	36	2
Baník Ostrava	2024–25	Czech First League	32	8	4	2	4 (Note: Appearances in UEFA Conference League)	0	0	0	40	10
Baník Ostrava	2025–26	Czech First League	5	0	0	0	6 (Note: Two appearances and one goal in UEFA Europa League, four appearances in UEFA Conference League)	0	—		11	0
Baník Ostrava	Total		82	11	6	2	10	0	0	0	98	13
AZ	2025–26	Eredivisie	18	1	2	1	7	1	—		27	3
ADO Den Haag (loan)	2026–27	Eredivisie	5	1	0	0	—		—		5	1
Career total			118	15	8	3	17	1	0	0	143	19

=== International ===
As of matches played 12 June 2025

Appearances and goals by national team and year
National team	Year	Apps	Goals
Czech Republic	2025	1	0
Total		1	0

== Honours ==
Individual

- Czech Talent of the Year: 2025
