= Jiří Fleišman =

Czech footballer (born 1984)

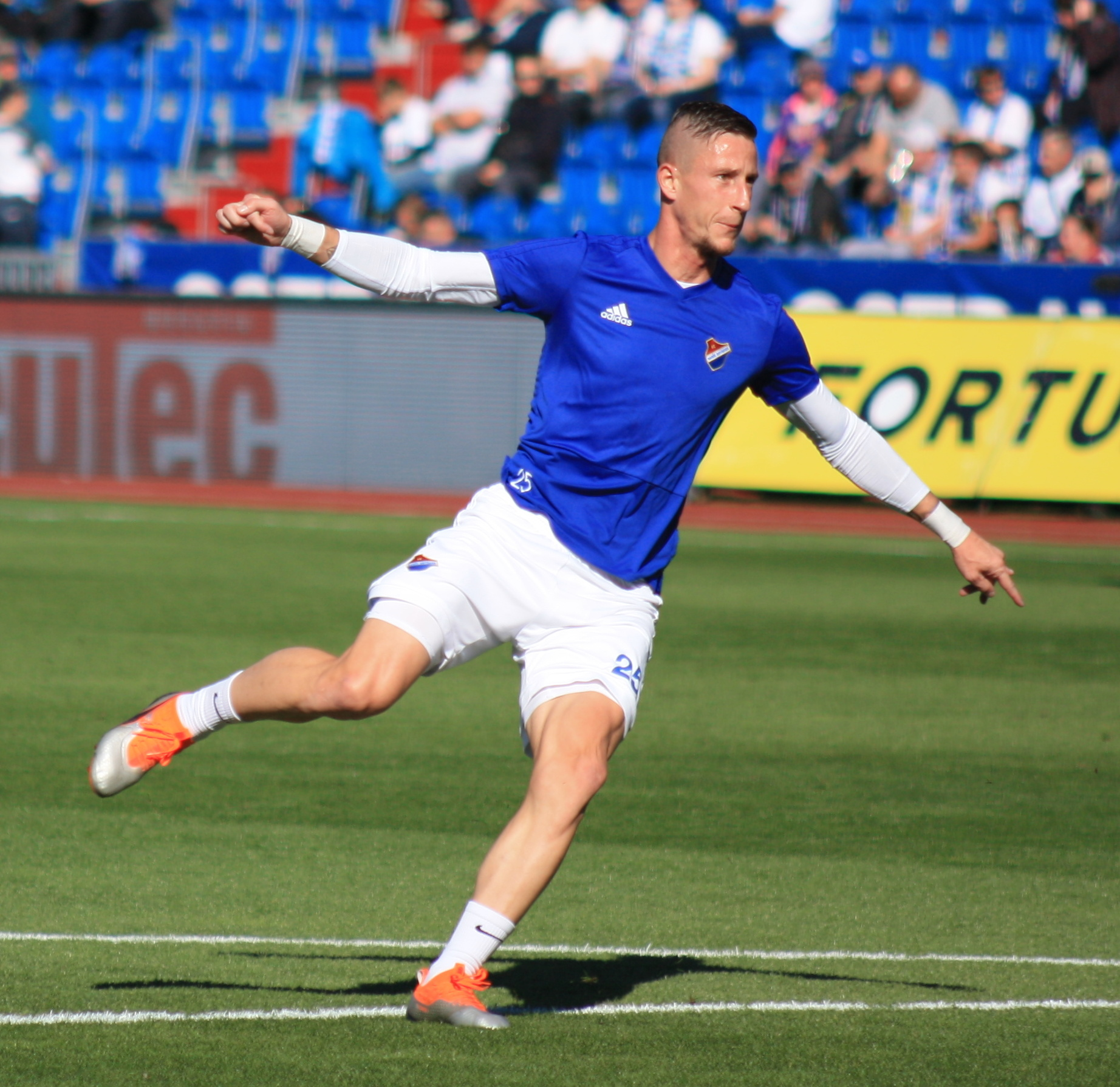
- Fleišman in Baník Ostrava jersey in 2018

Personal information
- Full name: Jiří Fleišman
- Date of birth: 2 October 1984 (age 42)
- Place of birth: Most, Czechoslovakia
- Position: Left back

Team information
- Current team: Karviná
- Number: 25

Senior career*
Years	Team	Apps	(Gls)
2010–2015	Slovan Liberec	128	(8)
2015–2018	Mladá Boleslav	63	(0)
2018–2024	Baník Ostrava	168	(10)
2023–2024	→ Karviná (loan)	26	(1)
2024–	Karviná	59	(0)

International career
2014	Czech Republic	1	(0)
- * Club domestic league appearances and goals as of 26 May 2026

Jiří Fleišman (born 2 October 1984) is a Czech professional footballer who plays as a defender for Karviná.

== Honours ==
Karviná

- Czech Cup: 2025–26
