= Muhammed Sanneh =

Gambian international footballer

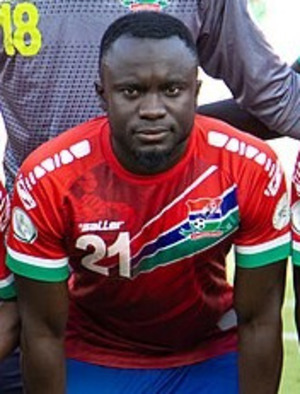
- Sanneh in 2024

Personal information
- Date of birth: 19 February 2000 (age 26)
- Place of birth: Serekunda, Gambia
- Height: 1.73 m (5 ft 8 in)
- Position: Right-back

Team information
- Current team: Abdysh-Ata
- Number: 21

Youth career
- Real de Banjul

Senior career*
Years	Team	Apps	(Gls)
2019–2021	Paide Linnameeskond	55	(3)
2021	→ Baník Ostrava (loan)	8	(0)
2021–2024	Baník Ostrava	16	(0)
2021–2024	Baník Ostrava B	31	(2)
2022	→ Pohronie (loan)	13	(0)
2023	→ S&B Vlašim (loan)	10	(0)
2025–	Abdysh-Ata	22	(2)

International career^{‡}
2019	Gambia U20	6	(1)
2021–	Gambia	11	(0)
- * Club domestic league appearances and goals as of 5 November 2025 ‡ National team caps and goals as of 03:18, 9 June 2021 (UTC)

Muhammed Sanneh (born 19 February 2000) is a Gambian professional footballer who plays as a right-back for Abdysh-Ata.

== Career ==
On 2 February 2019, Sanneh left his native Gambia and signed a professional contract with Paide. In December 2020, he was named into the Meistriliiga team of the season for his performance in the 2020 season. He joined the Czech team Baník Ostrava in January 2021. He made his professional debut with Baník Ostrava in a 1–1 Czech First League tie with Bohemians 1905 on 16 April 2021. Baník Ostrava activated his buyout clause on his loan, to keep with the club beyond the 2020–2021 season on 17 April 2021.

=== Loan at Pohronie ===
In January 2021, Sanneh signed a half-season loan with Pohronie.

=== Abdysh-Ata ===
On 4 March 2025, Sanneh was announced as part of Abdysh-Ata's squad for the 2025 season.

== International career ==
In June 2020, Sanneh received his first call-up to the senior Gambia national team. He debuted for the Gambia in a 1–0 friendly win over Togo on 8 June 2021. Sanneh was selected to represent Gambia at the 2023 Africa Cup of Nations.

== Personal life ==
Sanneh's older brother Bubacarr is also a professional footballer.

== Honours ==
=== Individual ===
- Meistriliiga Team of the season: 2020

Abdysh-Ata Kant

- Kyrgyzstan Super Cup: 2025
