= Ewerton (footballer, born 1996) =

Brazilian footballer

Personal information
- Full name: Ewerton Paixão da Silva
- Date of birth: 28 December 1996 (age 29)
- Place of birth: Laranjal do Jari, Amapá, Brazil
- Height: 1.75 m (5 ft 9 in)
- Position: Left winger

Team information
- Current team: Pyramids
- Number: 32

Youth career
- –2015: EC São Bernardo

Senior career*
Years	Team	Apps	(Gls)
2015–2017	EC São Bernardo		
2016–2017	→ Zlaté Moravce (loan)	6	(1)
2017–2018	Zlaté Moravce	46	(8)
2019–2022	Mladá Boleslav	38	(11)
2020–2021	→ Pardubice (loan)	39	(6)
2022–2024	Slavia Prague	14	(2)
2023–2024	→ Baník Ostrava (loan)	31	(14)
2024–2025	Baník Ostrava	27	(13)
2025–	Pyramids	12	(2)
- * Club domestic league appearances and goals as of 06 December 2025

Ewerton Paixão da Silva (born 28 December 1996), commonly known as Ewerton, is a Brazilian professional footballer who plays as a left winger for Egyptian club Pyramids.

== Career ==
=== Loan to Zlaté Moravce ===
Ewerton Paixão da Silva made his professional Fortuna Liga debut for FC ViOn Zlaté Moravce - Vráble against FC DAC 1904 Dunajská Streda on 10 December 2016. He scored his first goal for the club against Spartak Trnava on 27 May 2017, scoring in the 83rd minute.

=== Zlaté Moravce ===
Ewerton made his league debut for Zlaté Moravce against Ružomberok on 23 July 2017. He scored his first goals for the club against Slovan Bratislava on 21 October 2017, scoring in the 9th and 45th minute.

=== Mladá Boleslav ===
Ewerton made his league debut for Mladá Boleslav against Viktoria Plzeň on 9 February 2019. He scored a hattrick for the club against Slovácko on 26 September 2021.

=== Pardubice ===
Ewerton made his league debut for Pardubice against FC Vlašim on 8 March 2020. He scored his first goal for the club against Baník Sokolov on 3 June 2020, scoring in the 82nd minute.

=== Slavia Prague ===
Ewerton made his league debut for Slavia Prague against Hradec Králové on 31 July 2022. He scored his first goal for the club against České Budějovice on 11 September 2022, scoring in the 71st minute.

Ewerton also played for the B side SK Slavia Prague B on 6 March 2023.

==== Baník Ostrava (loan) ====
Ewerton made his league debut for Baník Ostrava against Slovan Liberec on 23 July 2023. He scored his first goal for the club against Mladá Boleslav on 2 September 2023, scoring in the 49th minute.

=== Baník Ostrava ===
On 28 June 2024, Ewerton signed a three-year contract with Czech club Baník Ostrava.

=== Pyramids ===
On 28 July 2025, Ewerton signed a contract with Egyptian club Pyramids.

== Career statistics ==
As of match played 12 April 2025.

Appearances and goals by club, season and competition
Club	Season	League			Cup		Continental		Other		Total	
Club	Season	Division	Apps	Goals	Apps	Goals	Apps	Goals	Apps	Goals	Apps	Goals
ViOn Zlaté Moravce (loan)	2016–17	Slovak First Football League	6	1	—		—		—		6	1
ViOn Zlaté Moravce	2017–18	Slovak First Football League	29	6	1	0	—		—		30	6
ViOn Zlaté Moravce	2018–19	Slovak First Football League	17	2	3	0	—		—		20	2
ViOn Zlaté Moravce	Total		52	9	4	0	—		—		56	9
Mladá Boleslav	2018–19	Czech First League	3	0	—		—		—		3	0
Mladá Boleslav	2019–20	Czech First League	1	0	1	0	1	0	—		3	0
Mladá Boleslav	2021–22	Czech First League	34	11	4	3	—		—		38	14
Mladá Boleslav	Total		38	11	5	3	1	0	—		44	14
Pardubice (loan)	2019–20	Czech National Football League	11	3	—		—		—		11	3
Pardubice (loan)	2020–21	Czech First League	28	3	1	0	—		—		29	3
Pardubice (loan)	Total		39	6	1	0	—		—		40	6
Slavia Prague	2022–23	Czech First League	14	2	3	1	9	2	—		26	5
Baník Ostrava (loan)	2023–24	Czech First League	31	14	3	0	—		—		34	14
Baník Ostrava	2024–25	Czech First League	24	12	1	1	4	2	—		29	15
Career total			198	54	17	5	14	4	—		229	63

== Honours ==
Slavia Prague

- Czech First League runner-up: 2022–23
- Czech Cup: 2022–23

Pyramids

- CAF Super Cup: 2025
- FIFA African–Asian–Pacific Cup: 2025
