= Lukáš Budínský =

Czech footballer

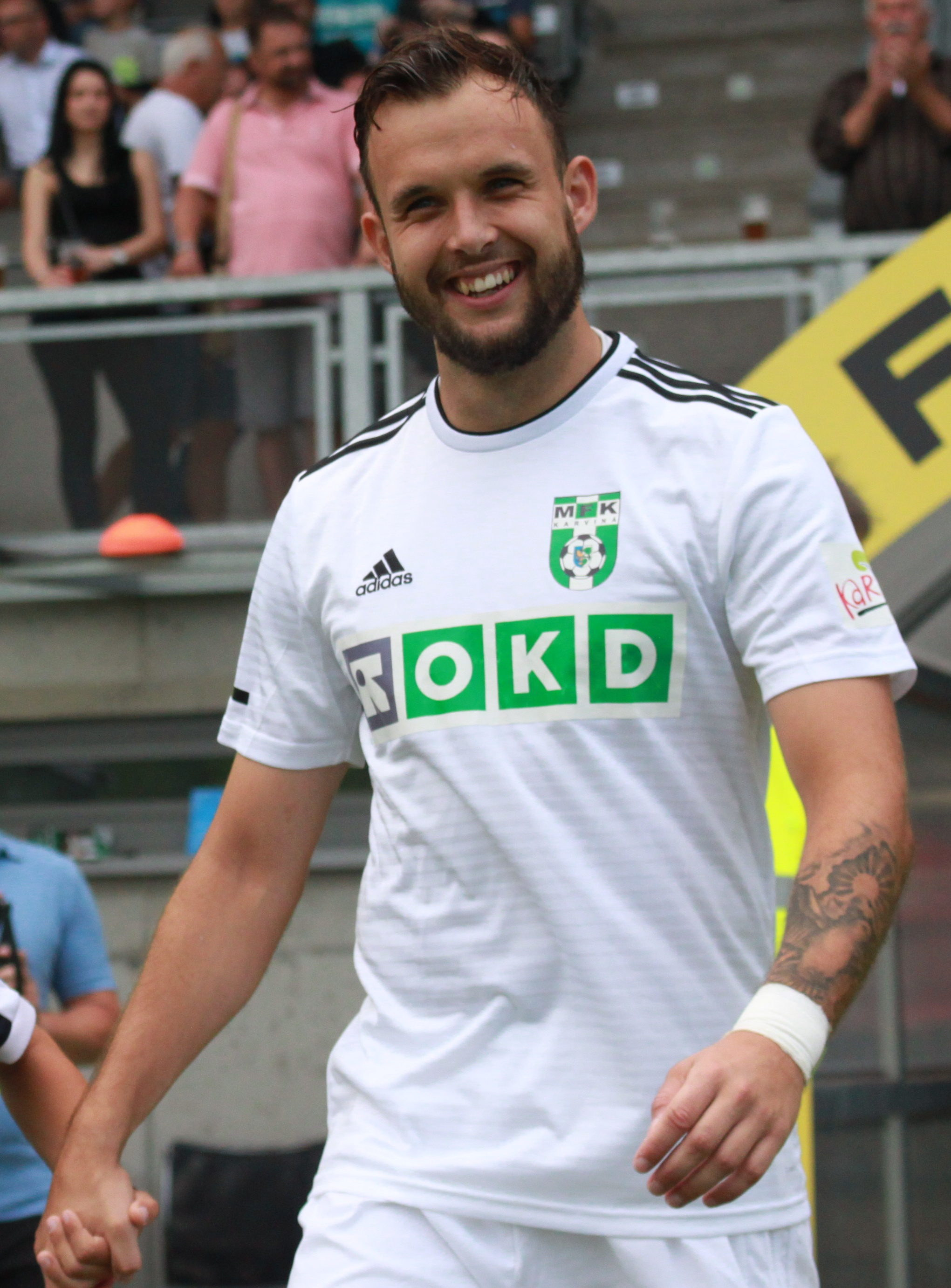

Personal information
- Date of birth: 27 March 1992 (age 34)
- Place of birth: Prague, Czechoslovakia
- Height: 1.86 m (6 ft 1 in)
- Position: Midfielder

Team information
- Current team: Prostějov
- Number: 23

Youth career
- Slavia Prague
- Bohemians 1905

Senior career*
Years	Team	Apps	(Gls)
2011–2015	Bohemians 1905	61	(3)
2014–2015	→ Karviná (loan)	20	(8)
2015–2019	Karviná	117	(35)
2019–2021	Mladá Boleslav	60	(15)
2021–2023	Baník Ostrava	25	(1)
2022–2023	→ Karviná (loan)	23	(4)
2023–2024	Karviná	27	(6)
2024	Zhenis	11	(2)
2025–	Prostějov	10	(0)

International career
2020	Czech Republic	1	(0)
- * Club domestic league appearances and goals as of 15 June 2025

Lukáš Budínský (born 27 March 1992) is a Czech footballer. He plays as a midfielder for Czech National Football League club Prostějov.

== Club career ==
Budínský made his way into the Bohemians 1905 first team in 2011 and made his league debut against Teplice on 21 May 2011.

== Career statistics ==
=== International ===
As of 7 September 2020

Czech Republic
Year	Apps	Goals
2020	1	0
Total	1	0

== Honours ==
MFK Karviná

- Czech National Football League: 2022–23
