= Ladislav Almási =

Slovak footballer

Personal information
- Date of birth: 6 March 1999 (age 27)
- Place of birth: Bratislava, Slovakia
- Height: 1.96 m (6 ft 5 in)
- Position: Forward

Team information
- Current team: Bohemians 1905

Youth career
- 2006–2015: Dunajská Streda
- 2013–2016: Senica

Senior career*
Years	Team	Apps	(Gls)
2016	Senica	5	(1)
2016–2020	Dunajská Streda	2	(0)
2019	→ Šamorín (loan)	13	(4)
2019	→ Petržalka (loan)	13	(11)
2020–2021	Ružomberok	21	(8)
2021	→ Akhmat Grozny (loan)	8	(0)
2021–2026	Baník Ostrava	80	(26)
2024	→ Osijek (loan)	9	(1)
2024–2025	→ Dunajská Streda (loan)	13	(2)
2025	→ Zalaegerszeg (loan)	11	(0)
2026–	Bohemians 1905	0	(0)

International career
2015–2016	Slovakia U17	4	(3)
2019–2020	Slovakia U21	9	(2)
2021–2022	Slovakia	9	(0)
- * Club domestic league appearances and goals as of 25 May 2026

Ladislav Almási (Hungarian: Almási László, born 6 March 1999) is a Slovak footballer who plays for Czech club Bohemians 1905 as a forward.

== Club career ==
=== Senica ===
Almási made his Slovak Super Liga debut for Senica against ViOn Zlaté Moravce on 1 March 2016.

==== Akhmat Grozny (loan) ====
On 20 January 2021, he joined Russian Premier League club FC Akhmat Grozny on loan until the end of the 2020–21 season, with an option to purchase. He played eight league games for Grozny but did not make the move a permanent one.

=== Baník Ostrava ===
Almási joined Czech side Baník Ostrava from Ružomberok in June 2021, signing a four-year contract. He was named the Czech First League player of the month for September 2021 after scoring in all of his club's league matches.

He scored three goals in the first half of the 2025–26 Czech First League before undergoing surgery for a sports hernia.

==== Loans to Osijek and Dunajská Streda ====
On 5 February 2024, Almási joined Osijek on a half-year loan deal. On 3 July 2024, Almási joined Dunajská Streda on a one-year loan deal with option to make the move permanent.

=== Bohemians 1905 ===
On 1 June 2026, Almási signed a contract with Bohemians 1905 until summer 2029.

== International career ==
Almási received his first call-up to the Slovakia national football team in October 2021. He made his debut for the national side against Russia in a 2022 FIFA World Cup qualification match, which Russia won 1–0. He came on after 79 minutes of play to replace Lukáš Haraslín with the final score of 1-0 already set, through a first-half own goal by Milan Škriniar. In December 2022, Almási was called up by Francesco Calzona for senior national team prospective players' training camp at NTC Senec.

== Personal life ==
Almási was born in Bratislava and is a member of the Hungarian ethnic minority in Slovakia.

== Honours ==
Individual

- Slovak Super Liga Player of the Month: September 2020
- Czech First League Player of the Month: September 2021
