= Jiří Klíma =

Czech footballer (born 1997)

Personal information
- Date of birth: 5 January 1997 (age 29)
- Place of birth: Jihlava, Czech Republic
- Height: 1.89 m (6 ft 2 in)
- Position: Forward

Team information
- Current team: Mladá Boleslav
- Number: 23

Youth career
- –2016: Vysočina Jihlava

Senior career*
Years	Team	Apps	(Gls)
2016–2019	Vysočina Jihlava	47	(9)
2016–2017	→ Znojmo (loan)	25	(5)
2019–2021	Mladá Boleslav	50	(14)
2021–2025	Baník Ostrava	95	(16)
2025	→ Slovácko (loan)	15	(3)
2025–	Mladá Boleslav	20	(3)

International career
2013	Czech Republic U16	6	(0)
2013–2014	Czech Republic U17	13	(7)
2014	Czech Republic U18	2	(0)
2015–2016	Czech Republic U19	8	(1)
2017	Czech Republic U20	2	(0)
- * Club domestic league appearances and goals as of 27 May 2026

Jiří Klíma (born 5 January 1997) is a Czech professional footballer who plays for Mladá Boleslav.

== Club career ==
He made his Czech First League debut for Vysočina Jihlava on 14 May 2016 in a game against Sparta Prague.

On 16 January 2025, Klíma joined Slovácko on a half-year loan deal with option to buy.

On 18 July 2025, Klíma signed a contract with Mladá Boleslav.
