= Jiří Boula =

Czech footballer (born 1999)

Personal information
- Date of birth: 8 April 1999 (age 27)
- Place of birth: Czech Republic
- Height: 1.80 m (5 ft 11 in)
- Position: Defensive midfielder

Team information
- Current team: FC Baník Ostrava
- Number: 5

Youth career
- 2011–2017: Sparta Prague

Senior career*
Years	Team	Apps	(Gls)
2019–2020	Mickleover		
2020–2021	Táborsko	22	(1)
2021–	Baník Ostrava	129	(4)
2021	→ Táborsko (loan)	15	(1)
- * Club domestic league appearances and goals as of 25 May 2026

Jiří Boula (born 8 April 1999) is a Czech professional footballer who plays as a defensive midfielder for Baník Ostrava.

== Life and club career ==
Boula was born on 8 April 1999. He was raised in the clubs ČAFC Prague and Olympie Dolní Břežany. From 2011 to 2017 (at the age of 12–18), he played for the youth teams of Sparta Prague. At the age of 18, he moved to England, where he studied at the University of Derby and played for the semi-professional club Mickleover.

In 2020, he transferred to Táborsko in the Czech National Football League, where he signed his first professional contract. In the mid-2021, he transferred FC Baník Ostrava, but remained on loan in Táborsko until the end of 2021.

He made his Czech First League debut for Baník Ostrava on 6 February 2022 in their 2–3 away win against Mladá Boleslav. He then became a stable part of the starting lineup with 80+ caps for Baník Ostrava.

== International career ==
Although Boula never played for any youth team in the Czech Republic, he was nominated for the senior Czech Republic national football team in November 2024 for two matches of the 2024–25 UEFA Nations League. However, he remained only among the substitutes. In March 2025, he was selected for the team again.
