= Filip Kaloč =

Czech footballer (born 2000)

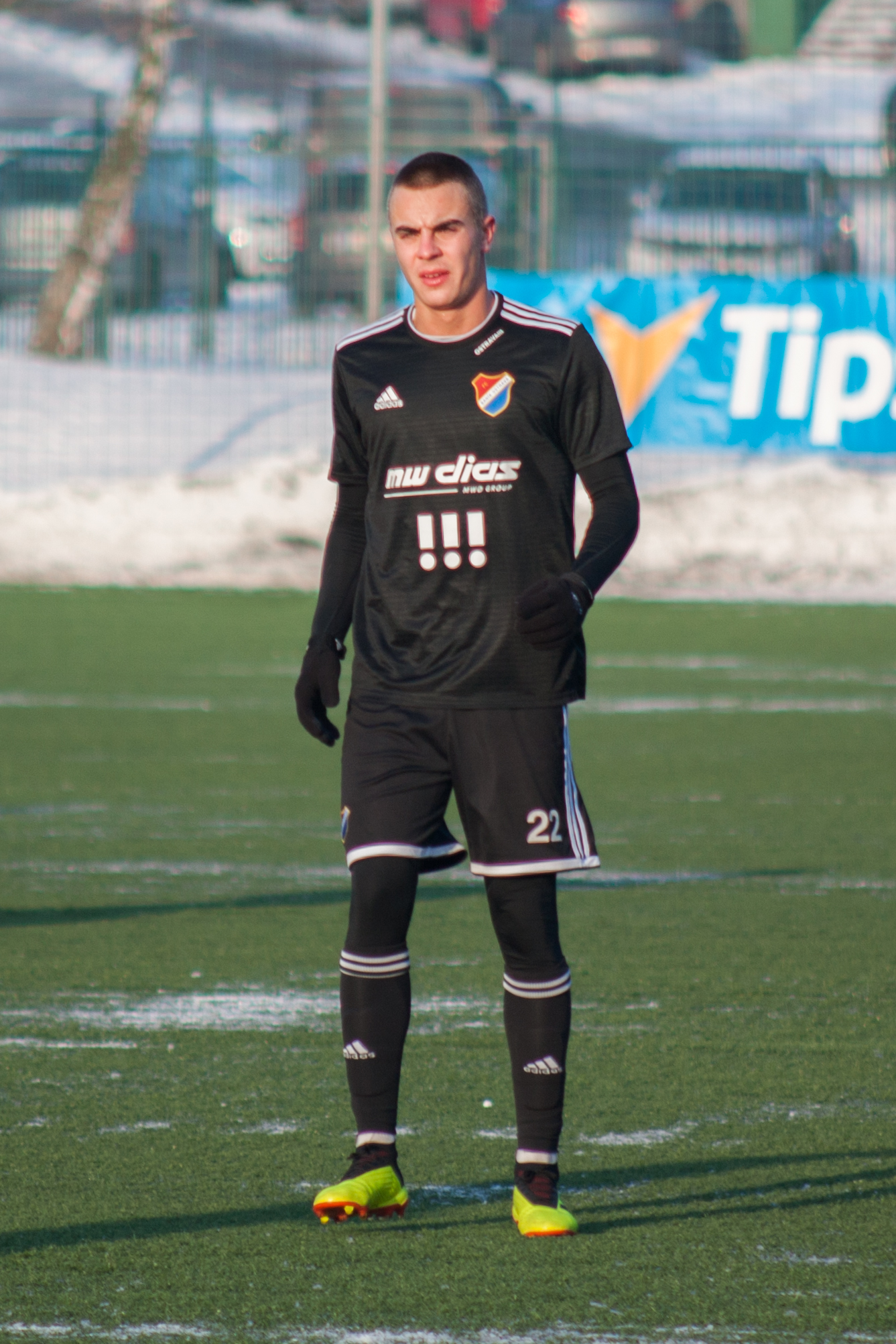
- Kaloč in 2019

Personal information
- Date of birth: 27 February 2000 (age 26)
- Place of birth: Ostrava, Czech Republic
- Height: 1.90 m (6 ft 3 in)
- Position: Central midfielder

Team information
- Current team: Ludogorets Razgrad
- Number: 26

Youth career
- Baník Ostrava

Senior career*
Years	Team	Apps	(Gls)
2018–2024	Baník Ostrava	103	(4)
2019	→ Vítkovice (loan)	12	(0)
2024	→ 1. FC Kaiserslautern (loan)	16	(2)
2024–2025	1. FC Kaiserslautern	30	(3)
2025–	Ludogorets Razgrad	38	(0)

International career
2015	Czech Republic U15	2	(0)
2015–2016	Czech Republic U16	4	(0)
2016	Czech Republic U17	4	(0)
2017–2018	Czech Republic U18	9	(2)
2018–2019	Czech Republic U19	4	(0)
2021–2023	Czech Republic U21	14	(0)
- * Club domestic league appearances and goals as of 9 September 2026

Filip Kaloč (born 27 February 2000) is a Czech professional footballer who plays as a central midfielder for Bulgarian First League club Ludogorets Razgrad.

== Life ==
Kaloč was born and raised in Ostrava.

== Club career ==
Kaloč played for the youth teams of Baník Ostrava. In the 2018–19 season, he made it to the roster of the senior team, but he only made his debut in senior football during a half-year loan at MFK Vítkovice in the spring of 2019, playing in the Czech National Football League. He made his Czech First League debut for Baník Ostrava on 5 October 2019 in their 4–0 home win against Zlín.

He played over 100 games for Ostrava, but after losing his place in the starting lineup under coach Pavel Hapal, he went on loan with an option to 1. FC Kaiserslautern in the 2. Bundesliga.

On 15 May 2024, 1. FC Kaiserslautern made the transfer permanent.

On 20 June 2025, Kaloč signed a contract with Ludogorets Razgrad.

== International career ==
Kaloč gradually played for almost all the youth Czech Republic national teams. He took part in the 2019 UEFA European Under-19 Championship. He was captain of the U21 team. His 14 appearances for the U21 team includes all the three matches at the 2023 UEFA European Under-21 Championship.
