= David Lischka =

Czech footballer (born 1997)

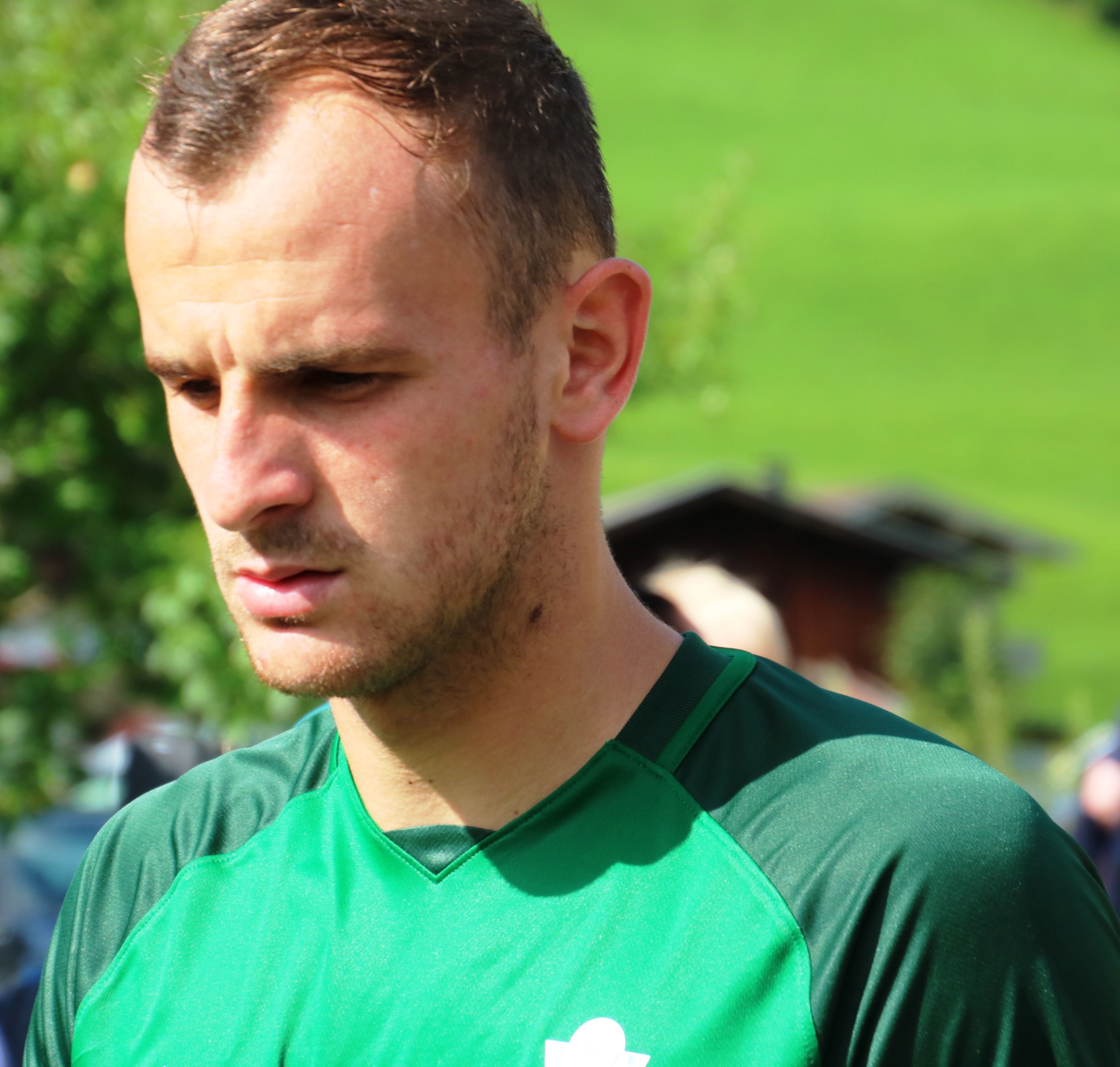
- Lischka in 2018

Personal information
- Date of birth: 15 August 1997 (age 29)
- Place of birth: Ludgeřovice, Czech Republic
- Height: 1.88 m (6 ft 2 in)
- Position: Defender

Team information
- Current team: Bohemians 1905
- Number: 27

Youth career
- Baník Ostrava
- Hlučín
- Jablonec

Senior career*
Years	Team	Apps	(Gls)
2016–2019	Jablonec	33	(4)
2016–2017	→ Baník Ostrava (loan)	3	(0)
2017	→ Varnsdorf (loan)	13	(1)
2017–2018	→ Karviná (loan)	7	(0)
2019–2021	Sparta Prague	19	(0)
2021	→ Baník Ostrava (loan)	18	(3)
2022–2026	Baník Ostrava	70	(3)
2026–	Bohemians 1905	13	(3)

International career
2014–2015	Czech Republic U18	8	(1)
2015–2016	Czech Republic U19	10	(0)
2016–2017	Czech Republic U20	4	(0)
2017–2018	Czech Republic U21	8	(1)
- * Club domestic league appearances and goals as of 27 May 2026

David Lischka (born 15 August 1997) is a Czech professional footballer who plays as a defender for Bohemians 1905.

== Career ==
In July 2019, Lischka joined Sparta Prague on a three-year contract. In January 2022 Lischka joined Baník Ostrava on a four-and-a-half-year contract.

On 6 January 2026, Lischka signed a contract with Bohemians 1905.

== Honours ==
Individual

- Czech Talent of the Year: 2018
