= David Buchta =

Czech footballer (born 1999)

Personal information
- Date of birth: 27 June 1999 (age 27)
- Place of birth: Krnov, Czech Republic
- Height: 1.84 m (6 ft 0 in)
- Position: Midfielder

Team information
- Current team: Radnički 1923
- Number: 19

Youth career
- 2009–2018: Baník Ostrava

Senior career*
Years	Team	Apps	(Gls)
2018–2026	Baník Ostrava	175	(27)
2019–2026	Baník Ostrava B	29	(12)
2026–	Radnički 1923	4	(3)

International career
2015–2016	Czech Republic U17	7	(1)
2017	Czech Republic U18	1	(0)
- * Club domestic league appearances and goals as of 19 September 2026

David Buchta (born 27 June 1999) is a Czech professional footballer who plays as a midfielder for Radnički 1923.

== Club career ==
Buchta was born on 27 June 1999 is Krnov and he started playing football there. In 2009, he started playing for FC Baník Ostrava, where he went through all youth categories.

He made his senior league debut for Baník Ostrava on 9 March 2020 in their Czech First League 2–3 home loss against Mladá Boleslav. He never played for any other club than Baník Ostrava. In the following years he became a stable part of the starting lineup. In March 2024, it was announced that Buchta extended his contract until June 2027.

In August 2026, Buchta transferred to the Serbian club Radnički 1923. He left Baník Ostrava after 175 league appearances and 27 goals, which in both cases places him in the top 10 of the club's Czech First League history.

== International career ==
Buchta played for the Czech U17 and U18 teams.
