= Městský stadion (Ostrava) =

Sports venue in Ostrava, Czech Republic

Městský stadion v Ostravě-Vítkovicích
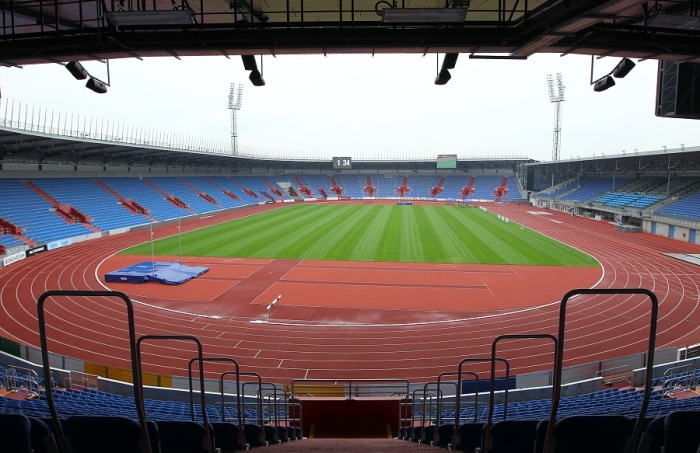
- Interactive map of Městský stadion v Ostravě-Vítkovicích
- Location: Ostrava, Czech Republic
- Coordinates: 49°48′16″N 18°15′21″E
- Capacity: 15,123

Construction
- Opened: 30 May 1941
- Renovated: 2012–2015

Tenants
- FC Vítkovice; FC Baník Ostrava (2015–); Czech Republic national football team

Městský stadion v Ostravě-Vítkovicích ('City Stadium in Ostrava-Vítkovice') is a multi-purpose stadium in Vítkovice, district of Ostrava, Czech Republic. Used primarily for football, it is the home stadium of FC Vítkovice and FC Baník Ostrava. It also hosts the annual Golden Spike Ostrava athletics meeting. The stadium holds 15,123 spectators. It hosted the 2018 IAAF Continental Cup.

== International matches ==
Městský stadion has hosted two competitive and two friendly matches of the Czech Republic national football team.

26 March 1996 International Friendly	Czech Republic	3–0	Turkey	Ostrava, Czech Republic
Match 527/19	Suchopárek 14'; Kuka 59' (pen.), 90'	Report		Stadium: Městský Stadion; Attendance: 10,828; Referee: Ihring (Slovakia)

13 November 2015 International Friendly	Czech Republic	4–1	Serbia	Ostrava, Czech Republic
Match 752/244	Sivok 17'; Necid 63' (pen.); Krejčí 82'; Zahustel 90'	Report	Škuletić 78'	Stadium: Městský Stadion; Attendance: 14,975; Referee: Vnuk (Slovakia)

11 October 2016 2018 FIFA World Cup; Qualification Group C	Czech Republic	0–0	Azerbaijan	Ostrava, Czech Republic
20:45 CEST (UTC+02)		FIFA report		Stadium: Městský Stadion; Attendance: 12,148; Referee: Jug (Slovenia)

2 September 2021 2022 FIFA World Cup; Qualification Group E	Czech Republic	1–0	Belarus	Ostrava, Czech Republic
20:45 CEST (UTC+02)	Barák 34'	FIFA report		Stadium: Městský Stadion; Attendance: 7,218; Referee: Jovanović (Serbia)
