= 2017–18 AC Sparta Prague season =

Sparta Prague
2017–18 season
- President: Daniel Křetínský
- Head coach: Andrea Stramaccioni (until 6 March); Pavel Hapal (from 6 March)
- Stadium: Generali Arena
- Czech First League: 5th
- Czech Cup: Fourth round
- UEFA Europa League: Third qualifying round
- Top goalscorer: League: Josef Šural (9); All: Josef Šural (10)
Home colours	Away colours	Third colours

The 2017–18 AC Sparta Prague season was the club's 123rd season in existence and the 25th consecutive season in the top flight of Czech football. In addition to the domestic league, AC Sparta Prague participated in this season's editions of the Czech Cup and the UEFA Europa League. The season covered the period from 1 July 2017 to 30 June 2018.

== Squad ==
Squad at end of season

Note: Flags indicate national team as defined under FIFA eligibility rules; some limited exceptions apply. Players may hold more than one non-FIFA nationality.

No.	Pos.	Nation	Player
1	GK	ROU	Florin Niță
2	DF	TUR	Semih Kaya
3	DF	ARG	Emanuel Insúa
4	DF	BIH	Eldar Čivić
7	MF	SRB	Mihailo Ristić
8	DF	CZE	David Hovorka
9	MF	GAB	Guélor Kanga
10	MF	ROU	Nicolae Stanciu
11	MF	ISR	Tal Ben Haim
13	DF	SWE	Johan Larsson
14	FW	CZE	Václav Kadlec
16	MF	CZE	Michal Sáček
17	MF	CZE	Martin Frýdek

No.	Pos.	Nation	Player
18	FW	CZE	Matěj Pulkrab
19	DF	SVK	Lukáš Štetina
20	MF	CZE	Martin Hašek
22	MF	SRB	Srđan Plavšić
23	FW	CZE	Josef Šural
24	MF	FRA	Rio Mavuba
25	MF	CZE	Jiří Kulhánek
26	DF	ZIM	Costa Nhamoinesu
27	DF	CZE	Ondřej Čelůstka
28	DF	CZE	Ondřej Zahustel
29	FW	GHA	Benjamin Tetteh
31	GK	CZE	Vojtěch Vorel
88	MF	ROU	Bogdan Vătăjelu

=== Out on loan ===
Note: Flags indicate national team as defined under FIFA eligibility rules; some limited exceptions apply. Players may hold more than one non-FIFA nationality.

No.	Pos.	Nation	Player
—	GK	SVK	Martin Dúbravka (to (England) Newcastle United)
—	DF	CZE	David Březina (to FC Vlašim)
—	DF	BIH	Eldar Čivić (to (Slovakia) Spartak Trnava)
—	DF	CZE	Václav Dudl (to FC Táborsko)
—	DF	SVK	Juraj Chvátal (to (Slovakia) MŠK Žilina)
—	DF	CZE	Milan Kadlec (to FC Vlašim)
—	DF	CZE	Daniel Köstl (to Slovan Liberec)
—	DF	CZE	Daniel Mareček (to FC Vlašim)
—	DF	CZE	Martin Nový (to Vysočina Jihlava)
—	DF	CZE	Milan Piško (to FC Vlašim)
—	DF	CZE	Jan Vondra (to České Budějovice)
—	MF	ESP	Néstor Albiach (to Dukla Prague)
—	MF	CZE	Patrik Čavoš (to České Budějovice)

No.	Pos.	Nation	Player
—	MF	CZE	Christián Frýdek (to FC Vlašim)
—	MF	CZE	Filip Havelka (to Slovan Liberec)
—	MF	CMR	Georges Mandjeck (to (France) FC Metz)
—	MF	CZE	Jakub Pešek (to České Budějovice)
—	MF	CZE	Rudolf Reiter (to Bohemians 1905)
—	MF	SRB	Vukadin Vukadinović (to FC Zlín)
—	MF	CZE	Tomáš Wiesner (to FC Slovan Liberec)
—	FW	CZE	David Čapek (to (Slovakia) MFK Ružomberok)
—	FW	CZE	Filip Hašek (to České Budějovice)
—	FW	CZE	Jakub Nečas (to Mladá Boleslav)
—	FW	CZE	Lukáš Pouček (to Ústí nad Labem)
—	FW	CZE	Daniel Turyna (to (Slovakia) FK Senica)

== Competitions ==
=== Overview ===
Competition	First match	Last match	Starting round	Final position	Record							
Competition	First match	Last match	Starting round	Final position	Pld	W	D	L	GF	GA	GD	Win %
Czech First League	30 July 2017	26 May 2018	Matchday 1	5th	30	14	11	5	43	25	+18	46.67
Czech Cup	20 September 2017	25 October 2017	Third round	Fourth round	2	1	1	0	3	2	+1	50.00
UEFA Europa League	27 July 2017	3 August 2017	Third qualifying round	Third qualifying round	2	0	0	2	0	3	−3	0.00
Total					34	15	12	7	46	30	+16	44.12

Source: Soccerway

=== Czech First League ===
==== League table ====
Pos	Team	Pld	W	D	L	GF	GA	GD	Pts	Qualification or relegation
3	Jablonec	30	16	8	6	49	27	+22	56	Qualification for the Europa League group stage (Note: Since the winners of the 2017–18 Czech Cup, Slavia Prague, qualified for European competition based on league position, the spot awarded to the cup winners was passed to the third-placed team, the spot awarded to the third-placed team was passed to the fourth-placed team, and the spot awarded to the fourth-placed team was passed to the fifth-placed team.)
4	Sigma Olomouc	30	15	10	5	41	22	+19	55	Qualification for the Europa League third qualifying round
5	Sparta Prague	30	14	11	5	43	25	+18	53	Qualification for the Europa League second qualifying round
6	Slovan Liberec	30	13	7	10	37	35	+2	46	
7	Bohemians 1905	30	9	11	10	30	29	+1	38	

Source: Fortuna liga, Soccerway
Rules for classification: 1) Points; 2) Head-to-head points; 3) Head-to-head goal difference; 4) Head-to-head goals scored; 5) Goal difference; 6) Goals scored; 7) Play-off (only if deciding champion, UEFA competitions, or relegation); 8) Draw.

==== Results summary ====
Overall								Home						Away					
Pld	W	D	L	GF	GA	GD	Pts	W	D	L	GF	GA	GD	W	D	L	GF	GA	GD
30	14	11	5	43	25	+18	53	11	3	1	28	9	+19	3	8	4	15	16	−1

Source: See results

==== Results by round ====
Round	1	2	3	4	5	6	7	8	9	10	11	12	13	14	15	16	17	18	19	20	21	22	23	24	25	26	27	28	29	30
Ground	H	A	A	H	A	H	A	H	A	H	A	H	A	H	A	H	H	A	H	A	H	A	H	A	H	A	H	A	H	A
Result	D	W	D	W	L	W	L	W	D	L	W	W	D	W	L	W	W	D	D	D	D	D	W	D	W	L	W	W	W	D
Position	7	5	5	4	6	4	5	4	5	6	5	5	5	5	5	5	4	5	5	5	6	6	6	6	4	5	5	5	4	5

Source: See results
A = Away; H = Home; W = Win; D = Draw; L = Loss

==== Matches ====
30 July 2017 1	Sparta Prague	1–1	Bohemians 1905	Prague
19:00 CEST (UTC+2)	Lafata 16' (pen.)	Report	Hůlka (yellow card) 15'; Šmíd 88'; Dostál (yellow card) 90+1'	Stadium: Generali Arena; Attendance: 16,724; Referee: Pavel Julínek

7 August 2017 2	Mladá Boleslav	0–1	Sparta Prague	Mladá Boleslav
17:00 CEST (UTC+2)	Stronati (yellow card) 26'	Report	Lafata 28'; Ćivić (yellow card) 54'; Sáček (yellow card) 90+2'	Stadium: Městský stadion Attendance: 5,000; Referee: Jan Jílek

13 August 2017 3	Slovan Liberec	1–1	Sparta Prague	Liberec
18:00 CEST (UTC+2)	Kúdela (yellow card) 30' (yellow-red card) 55'; Kerbr (yellow card) 55' (yellow-red card) 57'; Ševčík (yellow card) 55'; Breite 63'; Coufal (yellow card) 82'	Report	Sáček (yellow card) 18'; Frýdek 27'; Mandjeck (yellow card) 49'; Ben Haim (yellow card) 58'; Ćivić (yellow card) 61' (yellow-red card) 71'; Rosický (yellow card) 82'	Stadium: Stadion u Nisy; Attendance: 9,800; Referee: Miroslav Zelinka

18 August 2017 4	Sparta Prague	1–0	Slovácko	Prague
20:15 CEST (UTC+2)	Lafata 60'	Report	Reinberk (yellow card) 24'; Hofmann (yellow card) 85'; Daníček (yellow card) 88'	Stadium: Generali Arena; Attendance: 11,696; Referee: Pavel Královec

26 August 2017 5	Zbrojovka Brno	2–0	Sparta Prague	Brno
17:00 CEST (UTC+2)	Polák 22'; Pavlík (yellow card) 44'; Vraštil (yellow card) 47' (yellow-red card) 67', (goal) 58'	Report	Mareček (yellow card) 13'; Vácha (yellow card) 65'	Stadium: Městský fotbalový stadion Srbská; Attendance: 9,800; Referee: Radek Příhoda

10 September 2017 6	Sparta Prague	2–0	MFK Karviná	Prague
18:00 CEST (UTC+2)	Rosický 17'; Hovorka 55'	Report		Stadium: Generali Arena; Attendance: 9,320; Referee: Martin Nenadál

17 September 2017 7	Slavia Prague	2–0	Sparta Prague	Prague
18:00 CEST (UTC+2)	Bořil (yellow card) 9'; Ngadeu-Ngadjui (yellow card) 42'; Škoda 71'; Hušbauer 90'	Report	Mareček (yellow card) 40'; Mandjeck (yellow card) 53'; Costa (yellow card) 87' (yellow-red card) 89'	Stadium: Eden Aréna; Attendance: 19,084; Referee: Jan Jílek

24 September 2017 8	Sparta Prague	3–0	Teplice	Prague
18:00 CEST (UTC+2)	V. Kadlec 16', 57'; Lafata 45'; Hovorka (yellow card) 58'	Report	Rezek (yellow card) 28'; Krob (yellow card) 46'; Kučera (yellow card) 56'; Červenka (yellow card) 78'	Stadium: Generali Arena; Attendance: 7,974; Referee: Petr Ardeleánu

30 September 2017 9	Dukla Prague	0–0	Sparta Prague	Prague
20:00 CEST (UTC+2)	Milošević (yellow card) 47'; Podaný (yellow card) 58'; Holenda (yellow card) 84'; Brandner (yellow card) 90+1'	Report		Stadium: Stadion Juliska; Attendance: 6,547; Referee: Karel Hrubeš

15 October 2017 10	Sparta Prague	0–1	Viktoria Plzeň	Prague
18:00 CEST (UTC+2)	V. Kadlec (yellow card) 10'	Report	Krmenčík (yellow card) 21'; Kolář 39'; Hejda (yellow card) 76'; Havel (yellow card) 84'; Hrošovský (yellow card) 90+1'; Zeman (yellow card) 90+3'	Stadium: Generali Arena; Attendance: 17,134; Referee: Radek Příhoda

21 October 2017 11	Jablonec	0–3	Sparta Prague	Jablonec nad Nisou
18:15 CEST (UTC+2)	Považanec (yellow card) 22'; Tecl (yellow card) 77'; Mihálik (yellow card) 87'	Report	Josef Šural 3', 16', 83'; David Hovorka (yellow card) 18'; M. Kadlec (yellow card) 88'	Stadium: Stadion Střelnice; Attendance: 4,883; Referee: Petr Ardeleánu

29 October 2017 12	Sparta Prague	3–2	Baník Ostrava	Prague
18:00 CET (UTC+1)	Šural 8' (pen.), (yellow card) 24'; Costa (yellow card) 51'; Zahustel 52'; Mandjeck (yellow card) 56'; Mareček (yellow card) 78'; Štetina 80'	Report	Granečný (yellow card) 10' (yellow-red card) 66'; Baroš 35'; Dyjan 55'; Pokorný (yellow card) 82'	Stadium: Generali Arena; Attendance: 9,125; Referee: Pavel Královec

5 November 2017 13	Fastav Zlín	2–2	Sparta Prague	Zlín
16:00 CET (UTC+1)	Ubong Ekpai 15'; Gajić (yellow card) 53'; Traoré (yellow card) 78'; Džafić 90+1'	Report	Šural 24'; Frýdek (yellow card) 76'; Janko 78'; Vătăjelu (yellow card) 80'	Stadium: Letná Stadion; Attendance: 5,492; Referee: Zbyněk Proske

17 November 2017 14	Sparta Prague	1–0	Vysočina Jihlava	Prague
15:00 CET (UTC+1)	V. Kadlec 4'; Costa (yellow card) 77'; Dúbravka (yellow card) 90+2'	Report	Klíma (yellow card) 86'	Stadium: Generali Arena; Attendance: 7,165; Referee: Miroslav Zelinka

26 November 2017 15	Sigma Olomouc	1–0	Sparta Prague	Olomouc
18:00 CET (UTC+1)	Chorý (yellow card) 23'; Sladký 56'	Report	Šural (yellow card) 58'; Frýdek (yellow card) 83'	Stadium: Andrův stadion Attendance: 11,028; Referee: Pavel Královec

3 December 2017 16	Sparta Prague	3–0	Mladá Boleslav	Prague
18:00 CET (UTC+1)	Ćivić 12', (yellow card) 22'; Zahustel 16'; Šural 36'; Frýdek (yellow card) 39'	Report	Fabián (yellow card) 20'; Jedlička (yellow card) 50'; Pauschek (yellow card) 77'	Stadium: Generali Arena; Attendance: 6,234; Referee: Karel Hrubeš

18 February 2018 17	Sparta Prague	2–0	Slovan Liberec	Prague
18:00 CET (UTC+1)	Stanciu 5'; Kanga 90+4' (pen.)	Report	Karafiát (yellow card) 14'; Bosančić (yellow card) 90'	Stadium: Generali Arena; Attendance: 13 811; Referee: Petr Ardeleánu

24 February 2018 18	Slovácko	1–1	Sparta Prague	Uherské Hradiště
16:30 CET (UTC+1)	Divíšek (yellow card) 20'; Janošek (yellow card) 56'; Zajíc 70'; Petr (yellow card) 80'	Report	V. Kadlec (yellow card) 47'; Drchal 53'; Plavšić (yellow card) 72'; Hovorka (yellow card) 78'	Stadium: Městský fotbalový stadion Miroslava Valenty; Attendance: 4,820; Referee: Radek Příhoda

4 March 2018 19	Sparta Prague	1–1	Zbrojovka Brno	Prague
18:00 CET (UTC+1)	Zahustel 61'	Report	Sukup (yellow card) 45'; Juhar 50'; Krejčí (yellow card) 64'; Lutonský (yellow card) 66'; Kryštůfek (red card) 69'; Polák (yellow card) 71'	Stadium: Generali Arena; Attendance: 7,513; Referee: Ondřej Pechanec

10 March 2018 20	MFK Karviná	1–1	Sparta Prague	Karviná
15:00 CET (UTC+1)	Budínský (yellow card) 33'; Wágner 87'; Panák (yellow card) 90+3'	Report	Kanga 24'; Frýdek (yellow card) 85'	Stadium: Městský stadion Attendance: 4,833; Referee: Pavel Franěk

17 March 2018 21	Sparta Prague	3–3	Slavia Prague	Prague
17:30 CET (UTC+1)	Stanciu 10', 43'; Souček 31' (o.g.); Lafata (yellow card) 55'; V. Kadlec (yellow card) 58'; Plavšić (yellow card) 69'; Šural (yellow card) 84'; Štetina (yellow card) 90+4'	Report	Danny (yellow card) 34'; Hromada (yellow card) 48'; Deli (yellow card) 69'; Stoch 70'; Bořil (yellow card) 77'; Deli 83'; Škoda 90+5' (pen.)	Stadium: Generali Arena; Attendance: 17,034; Referee: Pavel Královec

31 March 2018 22	Teplice	1–1	Sparta Prague	Teplice
18:00 CEST (UTC+2)	Ljevaković (yellow card) 37'; Červenka 57'	Report	Stanciu 40'; Zahustel (yellow card) 45'	Stadium: Na Stínadlech; Attendance: 10,142; Referee: Emanuel Marek

7 April 2018 23	Sparta Prague	3–0	Dukla Prague	Prague
15:00 CEST (UTC+2)	Šural 3', 80'; Plavšić 14'; Kulhánek (yellow card) 88'	Report	Holík (yellow card) 22'; Bilovský (yellow card) 51'; Milošević (yellow card) 84'	Stadium: Generali Arena; Attendance: 11,123; Referee: Pavel Julínek

15 April 2018 24	Viktoria Plzeň	2–2	Sparta Prague	Plzeň
18:00 CEST (UTC+2)	Radim Řezník 30', (yellow card) 77'; Michael Krmenčík (yellow card) 31'; Tomáš Hořava 52'; Roman Hubník (yellow card) 82'	Report	V. Kadlec 9'; Plavšić 12'; Štetina (yellow card) 28'; Niță (yellow card) 31'; Frýdek (yellow card) 47'; Hovorka (yellow card) 66'	Stadium: Doosan Arena; Attendance: 11,623; Referee: Zbyněk Proske

20 April 2018 25	Sparta Prague	2–0	Jablonec	Prague
20:15 CEST (UTC+2)	Stanciu 32'; Plavšić (yellow card) 40'; V. Kadlec 62'; Kanga (yellow card) 90+2'	Report	Holeš (yellow card) 31'; Kubista (yellow card) 87'; Zelený (yellow card) 90+1'	Stadium: Generali Arena; Attendance: 12,289; Referee: Karel Hrubeš

28 April 2018 26	Baník Ostrava	3–2	Sparta Prague	Ostrava
15:00 CEST (UTC+2)	Šindelář 22', (yellow card) 55'; Hlinka 51', (yellow card) 90'; Breda (yellow card) 63'; Baroš 86'	Report	Kanga 28' (pen.); Kulhánek (yellow card) 45+3'; Štetina (yellow card) 49'; V. Kadlec 60'	Stadium: Městský stadion Attendance: 15,020; Referee: Emanuel Marek

4 May 2018 27	Sparta Prague	2–1	Fastav Zlín	Prague
19:15 CEST (UTC+2)	Nicolae Stanciu 20', (yellow card) 50'; Lafata 59'; Plavšić (yellow card) 77'	Report	Traoré (yellow card) 36'; Bačo (yellow card) 61'; Ubong Ekpai 78'	Stadium: Generali Arena; Attendance: 9,437; Referee: Marek Nenadál

11 May 2018 28	Vysočina Jihlava	0–1	Sparta Prague	Jihlava
15:00 CEST (UTC+2)	Levin (yellow card) 64'	Report	Kanga 81', (yellow card) 82'	Stadium: Stadion v Jiráskově ulici Attendance: 4,500; Referee: Ondřej Berka

19 May 2018 29	Sparta Prague	1–0	Sigma Olomouc	Prague
16:00 CEST (UTC+2)	Šural 46'; Plavšić (yellow card) 59'; Štetina (yellow card) 74'	Report	Vepřek (yellow card) 30' (yellow-red card) 38'; Jemelka (yellow card) 80'	Stadium: Generali Arena; Attendance: 14,297; Referee: Radek Příhoda

26 May 2018 30	Bohemians 1905	0–0	Sparta Prague	Prague
16:00 CEST (UTC+2)		Report	Frýdek (yellow card) 61'; Šural (yellow card) 83'	Stadium: Ďolíček; Attendance: 4,970; Referee: Pavel Franěk

=== Czech Cup ===
20 September 2017 Third round	Znojmo	0–1	Sparta Prague	Znojmo
18:15 CEST (UTC+2)	Cihlář (yellow card) 11'; Růsek (yellow card) 29'	Report	Vătăjelu 26'; Sáček (yellow card) 27'; Mandjeck (yellow card) 71'; Mareček (yellow card) 88'; Dúbravka (yellow card) 90+2'	Stadium: Městský stadion Attendance: 3,100; Referee: Emanuel Marek

25 October 2017 Fourth round	Sparta Prague	2–2 (a.e.t.) (2–4 p)	Baník Ostrava	Prague
17:00 CEST (UTC+2)	Mavuba (yellow card) 20'; Janko 77', (yellow card) 80'; Sáček (yellow card) 104'; Šural 108'	Report	Morgan (yellow card) 15'; Šindelář (yellow card) 35'; Hrubý 37'; Stáňa (yellow card) 82'; Šustr (yellow card) 90+2'; Pokorný (yellow card) 91'; Azatskyi 93', (yellow card) 116'; O. Šašinka (yellow card) 119'; J. Šašinka (yellow card) 120+1'	Stadium: Generali Arena; Attendance: 4,213; Referee: Ondřej Pechanec
	Penalties
	Šural (penalty scored); Janko (penalty scored); Néstor (penalty missed); Karavayev (penalty missed)		(penalty scored) Pazdera; (penalty scored) Hrubý; (penalty scored) J. Šašinka; (penalty scored) O. Šašinka

=== UEFA Europa League ===
==== Qualifying rounds ====
===== Third qualifying round =====
27 July 2017 First leg	Red Star Belgrade (Serbia)	2–0	(Czech Republic) Sparta Prague	Belgrade, Serbia
20:30 CEST (UTC+2)	Boakye 13'; Le Tallec (yellow card) 62'; Kanga 65', (yellow card) 66'	Report	Vătăjelu (yellow card) 51'	Stadium: Rajko Mitić Stadium; Attendance: 32,816; Referee: Sergey Lapochkin (Russia)

3 August 2017 Second leg	Sparta Prague (Czech Republic)	0–1 (0–3 agg.)	(Serbia) Red Star Belgrade	Prague, Czech Republic
19:00 CEST (UTC+2)	Mandjeck (yellow card) 59'	Report	Boakye 19', (yellow card) 80'; Borjan (yellow card) 75'	Stadium: Generali Arena; Attendance: 16,808; Referee: Tony Chapron (France)
