= 2018–19 AC Sparta Prague season =

Sparta Prague
2018–19 season
- President: Daniel Křetínský
- Head coach: Pavel Hapal (until 27 July); Zdeněk Ščasný (from 27 July; until 25 April); Michal Horňák (from 25 April)
- Stadium: Generali Arena
- Czech First League: 3rd
- Czech Cup: Semi-final
- UEFA Europa League: Second qualifying round
- Top goalscorer: League: Guélor Kanga (12); All: Guélor Kanga (12)
- Highest home attendance: 17,398 (vs. SK Slavia Prague)
- Lowest home attendance: 6,420 (vs. FK Teplice)
Home colours	Away colours

The 2018–19 AC Sparta Prague season was the club's 124th season in existence and the 26th consecutive season in the top flight of Czech football. In addition to the domestic league, AC Sparta Prague participated in this season's editions of the Czech Cup and the UEFA Europa League. The season covered the period from 1 July 2018 to 30 June 2019.

Manager Pavel Hapal was fired on 27 July 2018, a day after loss against FK Spartak Subotica in first leg of UEFA Europa League's Second qualifying round. He was temporary replaced by Zdeněk Ščasný, Sparta's sports director.

== Squad ==
Squad at end of season

Note: Flags indicate national team as defined under FIFA eligibility rules; some limited exceptions apply. Players may hold more than one non-FIFA nationality.

No.	Pos.	Nation	Player
1	GK	ROU	Florin Niță
3	DF	CZE	Dominik Plechatý
4	DF	BIH	Eldar Ćivić
5	DF	SRB	Uroš Radaković
6	MF	CZE	Lukáš Vácha
7	MF	SWE	David Moberg Karlsson
8	FW	CZE	Matěj Pulkrab
9	MF	GAB	Guélor Kanga
10	MF	CZE	Bořek Dočkal
11	MF	ISR	Tal Ben Chaim
14	FW	CZE	Václav Kadlec
15	DF	CZE	Matěj Hanousek
16	MF	CZE	Michal Sáček
17	MF	CZE	Martin Frýdek

No.	Pos.	Nation	Player
18	DF	ROU	Alexandru Chipciu
19	DF	SVK	Lukáš Štetina
20	FW	CZE	Adam Hložek
21	MF	CZE	Martin Hašek
22	MF	SRB	Srđan Plavšić
24	FW	CZE	Václav Drchal
26	DF	ZIM	Costa Nhamoinesu
27	DF	CZE	Filip Panák
28	DF	CZE	Ondřej Zahustel
29	GK	CZE	Milan Heča
30	FW	GHA	Benjamin Tetteh
33	FW	AUS	Golgol Mebrahtu
35	GK	CZE	David Bičík

=== Out on loan ===
Note: Flags indicate national team as defined under FIFA eligibility rules; some limited exceptions apply. Players may hold more than one non-FIFA nationality.

No.	Pos.	Nation	Player
—	GK	CZE	Vojtěch Vorel (to (Slovakia) FK Senica)
—	DF	CZE	David Březina (to FC Vlašim)
—	DF	CZE	Marian Burda (to Žižkov)
—	DF	CZE	Václav Dudl (to (Slovakia) Spartak Trnava)
—	DF	UKR	Vadym Chervak (to FC Vlašim)
—	DF	CZE	Milan Kadlec (to FC Vlašim)
—	DF	CZE	Daniel Köstl (to Slovan Liberec)
—	DF	TUR	Semih Kaya (to (Turkey) Galatasaray)
—	DF	CZE	Martin Nový (to Vysočina Jihlava)
—	DF	CZE	Milan Piško (to FC Vlašim)
—	DF	CZE	Tomáš Wiesner (to Mladá Boleslav)
—	MF	CZE	Patrik Čavoš (to České Budějovice)

No.	Pos.	Nation	Player
—	MF	CZE	Christián Frýdek (to Táborsko)
—	MF	CZE	Jiří Kulhánek (to (Slovakia) Spartak Trnava)
—	MF	CMR	Georges Mandjeck (to (Israel) Maccabi Haifa)
—	MF	BIH	Zinedin Mustedanagić (to (Slovakia) MFK Ružomberok)
—	MF	CZE	Jakub Pešek (to České Budějovice)
—	MF	ROU	Bogdan Vătăjelu (to FK Jablonec)
—	MF	SRB	Vukadin Vukadinović (to (Turkey) Boluspor)
—	FW	CZE	David Čapek (to (Slovakia) MFK Ružomberok)
—	FW	CZE	Lukáš Juliš (to Bohemians 1905)
—	FW	CZE	Ondřej Novotný (to FC Vlašim)
—	FW	CZE	Lukáš Pouček (to Ústí nad Labem)
—	FW	CZE	Daniel Turyna (to České Budějovice)

== Pre-season and friendlies ==
Win Draw Loss

23 June 2018	Sparta Prague (Czech Republic)	1–2	(Slovakia) Trenčín
11:00 CEST	Tetteh 22'		Ubbink 10'; Ćataković 77'

23 June 2018	Sparta Prague (Czech Republic)	4–2	(Slovakia) Trenčín
14:00 CEST	Ben Chaim 48'; Ristić 63'; Stanciu 83'; Holzer 86'		Paur 72', 75'

27 June 2018	Sparta Prague (Czech Republic)	0–0	(Slovakia) Ružomberok
11:00 CEST

3 July 2018	Sparta Prague (Czech Republic)	0–1	(Scotland) Celtic
17:30 CEST			Dembélé 20'

6 July 2018	Sparta Prague	1–2	Dynamo České Budějovice
15:00 CEST	Vácha 18'		Kladrubský 36' (pen.); Pouček 47'

10 July 2018	Sparta Prague (Czech Republic)	2–1	(Russia) Krylia Sovetov Samara
16:00 CEST	Ben Chaim 2' (pen.); Vukadinović 88'		Tkachuk 29'

14 July 2018	Sparta Prague (Czech Republic)	1–2	(Poland) Zagłębie Lubin	Prague
17:00 CEST	Ristić 17'		Pawlowski 15'; Janoszka 50'	Stadium: Generali Arena

9 January 2019	Sparta Prague	3–1	Dynamo České Budějovice	Prague
11:00 CET	Drchal 18'; Stanciu 33'; Patrák 82'		Mršić 62'	Stadium: Strahov Stadium

12 January 2019	Sparta Prague (Czech Republic)	2–0	(Germany) Energie Cottbus	Cottbus
14:00 CET	Tetteh 34'; Chipciu 50'			Stadium: Stadion der Freundschaft

16 January 2019	Sparta Prague	5–0	Loko Vltavín	Prague
11:00 CET	Drchal 7', 24'; Ćivić 35'; Stanciu 79'; Chervak 81'			Stadium: Strahov Stadium

== Competitions ==
=== Overview ===
Competition	First match	Last match	Starting round	Final position	Record							
Competition	First match	Last match	Starting round	Final position	Pld	W	D	L	GF	GA	GD	Win %
Czech First League	21 July 2018	26 May 2019	Matchday 1	3rd	35	20	6	9	59	33	+26	57.14
Czech Cup	2 October 2018	24 April 2019	Third round	Semi-finals	4	3	0	1	6	4	+2	75.00
UEFA Europa League	26 July 2018	2 August 2018	Second qualifying round	Second qualifying round	2	1	0	1	2	3	−1	50.00
Total					41	24	6	11	67	40	+27	58.54

Source: Soccerway

=== Czech First League ===
==== Regular season ====
===== League table =====
Pos	Team	Pld	W	D	L	GF	GA	GD	Pts	Qualification or relegation
1	Slavia Prague	30	23	3	4	72	23	+49	72	Qualification for the championship group
2	Viktoria Plzeň	30	21	5	4	47	27	+20	68	Qualification for the championship group
3	Sparta Prague	30	17	6	7	52	27	+25	57	Qualification for the championship group
4	Jablonec	30	15	6	9	53	26	+27	51	Qualification for the championship group
5	Baník Ostrava	30	13	6	11	38	36	+2	45	Qualification for the championship group

Source: Fortuna liga, Soccerway
Rules for classification: 1) Points; 2) Head-to-head points; 3) Head-to-head goal difference; 4) Head-to-head goals scored; 5) Goal difference; 6) Goals scored; 7) Fair-play ranking; 8) Draw.

===== Results summary =====
Overall								Home						Away					
Pld	W	D	L	GF	GA	GD	Pts	W	D	L	GF	GA	GD	W	D	L	GF	GA	GD
30	17	6	7	52	27	+25	57	10	3	2	30	13	+17	7	3	5	22	14	+8

Source: See results

===== Results by round =====
Round	1	2	3	4	5	6	7	8	9	10	11	12	13	14	15	16	17	18	19	20	21	22	23	24	25	26	27	28	29	30
Ground	H	A	H	A	H	A	H	A	H	A	A	H	A	H	A	H	A	H	A	H	A	H	A	H	H	A	H	A	H	A
Result	W	W	W	W	D	D	W	W	W	L	L	W	L	D	W	D	L	L	D	W	W	W	W	W	W	L	W	D	L	W
Position	3	2	2	2	2	4	3	3	2	3	3	3	4	3	3	3	4	5	5	4	3	3	3	3	3	3	3	3	3	3

Source: See results
A = Away; H = Home; W = Win; D = Draw; L = Loss

===== Matches =====
21 July 2018 1	Sparta Prague	2–0	Opava	Prague
19:00 CEST (UTC+2)	Kanga (yellow card) 32', (goal) 73'; Nhamoinesu (yellow card) 38'; Svozil 84' (o.g.)	Report	Kayamba (yellow card) 27'; Schaffarztik (yellow card) 78'	Stadium: Generali Arena; Attendance: 12,186; Referee: Pavel Královec

29 July 2018 2	Jablonec	1–2	Sparta Prague	Jablonec
18:00 CEST (UTC+2)	Masopust (yellow card) 44'; Lischka 88'	Report	Nhamoinesu (yellow card) 12'; Kaya (yellow card) 28'; Kanga 53', (yellow card) 84'; Frýdek (yellow card) 59'; Vukadinović 69' (yellow card) 80'; Chipciu (yellow card) 84'	Stadium: Stadion Střelnice; Attendance: 5,950; Referee: Radek Příhoda

5 August 2018 3	Sparta Prague	1–0	Slovácko	Prague
18:00 CEST (UTC+2)	Tetteh 32', (yellow card) 45+3'; Radaković (yellow card) 55'; Niță (yellow card) 84'; Plavšić (yellow card) 90+4'	Report	Hofmann (yellow card) 14'; Daníček (yellow card) 88'	Stadium: Generali Arena; Attendance: 9,034; Referee: Zbyněk Proske

12 August 2018 4	Teplice	0–4	Sparta Prague	Teplice
18:00 CEST (UTC+2)	Ljevaković (yellow card) 26'; Krob (yellow card) 45+1'	Report	Šural 2', 17'; Frýdek 29'; Kanga (yellow card) 34'; Stanciu 39', (yellow card) 48'; Chipciu (yellow card) 79'	Stadium: Na Stínadlech; Attendance: 15,131; Referee: Karel Hrubeš

19 August 2018 5	Sparta Prague	2–2	1. FK Příbram	Prague
18:00 CEST (UTC+2)	Kanga 38' (pen.); Chipciu 69'	Report	Slepička 6'; Květ (yellow card) 30'; Tregler (red card) 42'; Antwi 86'; Skácel (yellow card) 89'; Švenger (yellow card) 90+3'	Stadium: Generali Arena; Attendance: 11,978; Referee: Pavel Franěk

24 August 2018 6	Bohemians 1905	1–1	Sparta Prague	Prague
18:30 CEST (UTC+2)	Nečas (yellow card) 49'; Hilál (yellow card) 69'; Záviška 87'	Report	Šural 61', (yellow card) 85'; Vătăjelu (yellow card) 71'; Plavšić (yellow card) 75'	Stadium: Ďolíček; Attendance: 4,931; Referee: Ondřej Berka

31 August 2018 7	Sparta Prague	2–0	Dukla Prague	Prague
18:30 CEST (UTC+2)	Tetteh 45+1'; Kanga 82', (yellow card) 82'	Report	Hanousek (yellow card) 40'; Tetour (yellow card) 56'; Brandner (yellow card) 61'; Chlumecký (yellow card) 74'; Podaný (yellow card) 89'	Stadium: Generali Arena; Attendance: 9,824; Referee: Ondřej Pechanec

17 September 2018 8	Baník Ostrava	0–1	Sparta Prague	Ostrava
18:00 CEST (UTC+2)	Diop (yellow card) 30'; Fillo (yellow card) 41'; Pazdera (yellow card) 58'; Šašinka (yellow card) 90'	Report	Šural (yellow card) 31'; Tetteh (yellow card) 41' (goal) 77'; Frýdek (yellow card) 45+3'; Niță (yellow card) 90'; Vácha (yellow card) 90+2'; Vukadinović (yellow card) 90+7'	Stadium: Městský stadion Attendance: 14,212; Referee: Pavel Královec

22 September 2018 9	Sparta Prague	4–1	Slovan Liberec	Prague
19:00 CEST (UTC+2)	Stanciu 17', 90'; Tetteh 27', 34'; Radaković (yellow card) 88'	Report	Potočný (yellow card) 19', (goal) 90'; Vuklišević (red card) 55'; Breite (yellow card) 55'; Koscelnik (yellow card) 71'	Stadium: Generali Arena; Attendance: 11,867; Referee: Petr Ardeleánu

28 September 2018 10	Viktoria Plzeň	1–0	Sparta Prague	Plzeň
19:00 CEST (UTC+2)	Limberský (yellow card) 15'; Hrošovský (yellow card) 30'; Petržela (yellow card) 55'; Radaković 76' (o.g.)	Report	Tetteh (yellow card) 15'; Šural (yellow card) 40'; Kanga (yellow card) 60'; Kaya (yellow card) 89'; Vácha (yellow card) 90+1'; Nhamoinesu (yellow card) 90+4'; Stanciu (red card) 90+9'	Stadium: Doosan Arena; Attendance: 11,489; Referee: Pavel Julínek

6 October 2018 11	Sigma Olomouc	1–0	Sparta Prague	Olomouc
19:00 CEST (UTC+2)	Nešpor 35'; Houska (yellow card) 66'; Zahradníček (yellow card) 66'	Report	Vătăjelu (yellow card) 66'; Šural (yellow card) 68'; Kanga (yellow card) 90+3'	Stadium: Andrův stadion Attendance: 7,259; Referee: Pavel Franěk

22 October 2018 12	Sparta Prague	4–1	Mladá Boleslav	Prague
18:00 CEST (UTC+2)	Tetteh 20', 38'; Pulkrab 19'; Kanga 64' (pen.), (yellow card) 87'; Ćivić (yellow card) 72'	Report	Komlichenko (yellow card) 59'; Hůlka 84'	Stadium: Generali Arena; Attendance: 9,147; Referee: Pavel Orel

27 October 2018 13	Fastav Zlín	1–0	Sparta Prague	Zlín
17:00 CEST (UTC+2)	Podio (yellow card) 61'; Beauguel 84'	Report	Chipciu (yellow card) 45'; Stanciu (yellow card) 67'	Stadium: Letná stadium Attendance: 5,147; Referee: Zbyněk Proske

4 November 2018 14	Sparta Prague	2–2	Slavia Prague	Prague
17:00 CET (UTC+1)	Kanga (yellow card) 17', (goal) 45+2' (pen.); Radaković (yellow card) 31'; Chipciu (yellow card) 40'; Tetteh 42'	Report	Ngadeu-Ngadjui (yellow card) 7'; Kúdela 36', (yellow card) 45'; Traoré (yellow card) 45+1'; Souček (yellow card) 48', (goal) 70'; Olayinka (yellow card) 84'	Stadium: Generali Arena; Attendance: 17,398; Referee: Petr Ardeleánu

10 November 2018 15	MFK Karviná	1–3	Sparta Prague	Karviná
14:00 CET (UTC+1)	Budínský 34' (pen.), (red card) 45'; Smrž (yellow card) 57'; Krivak (yellow card) 81'	Report	Pulkrab (yellow card) 45+1'; Radaković 51'; Ćivić (yellow card) 55'; Stanciu 71'; Plavšić (yellow card) 76', (goal) 86' (pen.)	Stadium: Městský stadion Attendance: 4,260; Referee: Pavel Julínek

25 November 2018 16	Sparta Prague	0–0	Jablonec	Prague
17:00 CET (UTC+1)	Frýdek (yellow card) 42'; Stanciu (penalty missed) 69'; Ćivić (yellow card) 78'	Report	Sobol (yellow card) 45'; Hübschman (yellow card) 84'	Stadium: Generali Arena; Attendance: 11,614; Referee: Pavel Královec

1 December 2018 17	Slovácko	2–1	Sparta Prague	Uherské Hradiště
17:00 CET (UTC+1)	Juroška (yellow card) 51'; Kalabiška (yellow card) 62'; Janošek (yellow card) 67'; Hofmann (yellow card) 80'; Zajíc 84'; Havlík (yellow card) 85', (goal) 90+3' (pen.)	Report	Kanga (penalty missed) 23', (red card) 78'; Pulkrab 61'; Frýdek (yellow card) 87'; Stanciu (yellow card) 87'; Ćivić (red card) 90'; Ristić (penalty missed) 90+7'	Stadium: Městský stadion Miroslava Valenty; Attendance: 5,124; Referee: Radek Příhoda

9 December 2018 18	Sparta Prague	0–1	Teplice	Prague
17:00 CET (UTC+1)	Plavšić (yellow card) 23'; Stanciu (yellow card) 70'	Report	Jeřábek (yellow card) 16'; Kučera (yellow card) 45'; Vondrášek (yellow card) 61'; Hyčka (yellow card) 62'; Moulis 83'	Stadium: Generali Arena; Attendance: 6,420; Referee: Karel Hrubeš

15 December 2018 19	1. FK Příbram	1–1	Sparta Prague	Příbram
17:00 CET (UTC+1)	Soldát (yellow card) 29'; Voltr (yellow card) 34'; Rezek 45+5'; Keita (yellow card) 45+9'	Report	Tetteh 30'; Frýdek (yellow card) 65'; Nhamoinesu (yellow card) 78'	Stadium: Na Litavce; Attendance: 4,182; Referee: Jan Jílek

10 February 2019 20	Sparta Prague	1–0	Bohemians 1905	Prague
17:00 CET (UTC+1)	Plechatý (yellow card) 70'; Frýdek 90+2'	Report	Vacek (yellow card) 39'; Levin (yellow card) 67' (yellow-red card) 83'; Dostál (yellow card) 90+1'	Stadium: Generali Arena; Attendance: 11,625; Referee: Zbyněk Proske

18 February 2019 21	Dukla Prague	2–3	Sparta Prague	Prague
18:00 CET (UTC+1)	Milošević 3'; Plechatý 56' (o.g.); Kovaľ (yellow card) 58'; Kozma (yellow card) 63'; Ostojić (yellow card) 77'; González (yellow card) 79'	Report	Kanga 12'; Zahustel 64', (yellow card) 90+2'; Tetteh 81'	Stadium: Stadion Juliska; Attendance: 6,122; Referee: Pavel Královec

24 February 2019 22	Sparta Prague	3–2	Baník Ostrava	Prague
17:00 CET (UTC+1)	Štetina (yellow card) 33' (yellow-red card) 61', (goal) 39'; Karlsson (yellow card) 45+1', (goal) 57'; Drchal 77'	Report	Diop 29', (yellow card) 50'; Baroš (yellow card) 36'; Fillo (yellow card) 45+1'; Fleišman (yellow card) 45+2'; Jánoš (yellow card) 68'; Kuzmanović 90'	Stadium: Generali Arena; Attendance: 15,225; Referee: Jiří Houdek

2 March 2019 23	Slovan Liberec	0–1	Sparta Prague	Liberec
17:00 CET (UTC+1)	Kozák (yellow card) 33' (penalty missed) 80'; Potočný (yellow card) 45+1'	Report	Sáček (yellow card) 30'; Nhamoinesu (yellow card) 33', (goal) 57'; Zahustel (yellow card) 80'	Stadium: Stadion u Nisy; Attendance: 9,546; Referee: Pavel Franěk

9 March 2019 24	Sparta Prague	4–0	Viktoria Plzeň	Prague
17:30 CET (UTC+1)	Hložek 10'; Kanga (yellow card) 17', (goal) 29' (pen.); Sáček 68'; Kadlec (yellow card) 90+8'; Pulkrab 90+13'	Report	Kovařík (yellow card) 50' (yellow-red card) 90+3'; Chorý (yellow card) 73'	Stadium: Generali Arena; Attendance: 16,110; Referee: Ondřej Pechanec

16 March 2019 25	Sparta Prague	2–1	Sigma Olomouc	Prague
17:30 CET (UTC+1)	Frýdek (yellow card) 26'; Nhamoinesu (yellow card) 27'; Kanga 71' (pen.), 77' (pen.), (yellow card) 90+3'; Štetina (yellow card) 76'	Report	Houska (yellow card) 15'; Sladký (yellow card) 20'; Falta 45'; Beneš (yellow card) 70'; Nešpor (yellow card) 76' (yellow-red card) 81'; Plšek (yellow card) 79'	Stadium: Generali Arena; Attendance: 11,307; Referee: Petr Ardeleánu

30 March 2019 26	Mladá Boleslav	2–1	Sparta Prague	Mladá Boleslav
15:00 CET (UTC+1)	Túlio (yellow card) 45'; Matějovský (yellow card) 45+2', (goal) 81'; Bucha (yellow card) 47'; Komlichenko (yellow card) 50', (goal) 53'	Report	Frýdek (yellow card) 12'; Kanga 73' (pen.)	Stadium: Městský stadion Attendance: 5,000; Referee: Martin Nenadál

8 April 2019 27	Sparta Prague	2–0	Fastav Zlín	Prague
18:00 CEST (UTC+2)	Kanga (yellow card) 58'; Hložek 67'; Tetteh 70'	Report	Chanturishvili (yellow card) 37'; Hnaníček (yellow card) 65'	Stadium: Generali Arena; Attendance: 9,325; Referee: Miroslav Zelinka

14 April 2019 28	Slavia Prague	1–1	Sparta Prague	Prague
18:00 CEST (UTC+2)	Frydrych (yellow card) 11'; Hušbauer (yellow card) 14'; Souček 20'; Masopust (yellow card) 45+6'	Report	Štetina (yellow card) 42'; Kanga (yellow card) 45+8'; Plavšić 53'; Niță (yellow card) 90+4'	Stadium: Sinobo Stadium; Attendance: 19,370; Referee: Karel Hrubeš

21 April 2019 29	Sparta Prague	1–3	MFK Karviná	Prague
17:00 CEST (UTC+2)	Sáček (yellow card) 67'; Hašek 89'	Report	Wágner 4', 54'; Guba 25'	Stadium: Generali Arena; Attendance: 10,425; Referee: Emanuel Marek

27 April 2019 30	Opava	0–3	Sparta Prague	Opava
17:00 CEST (UTC+2)	Zapalač (yellow card) 11'; Smola (yellow card) 42'	Report	Štetina (yellow card) 17'; Hanousek 25'; Frýdek (yellow card) 42'; Hašek (yellow card) 52'; Karlsson 61'; Sáček (yellow card) 70'; Drchal (yellow card) 86', (goal) 88'	Stadium: Stadion v Městských sadech Attendance: 5,188; Referee: Jiří Houdek

==== Championship group ====
===== League table =====
Pos	Team	Pld	W	D	L	GF	GA	GD	Pts	Qualification
1	Slavia Prague (C)	35	26	5	4	79	26	+53	83	Qualification for the Champions League play-off round
2	Viktoria Plzeň	35	24	6	5	57	32	+25	78	Qualification for the Champions League second qualifying round
3	Sparta Prague	35	20	6	9	59	33	+26	66	Qualification for the Europa League third qualifying round
4	Jablonec	35	17	6	12	58	32	+26	57	Qualification for the Europa League second qualifying round
5	Baník Ostrava	35	13	8	14	39	43	−4	47	Qualification for the Europa League play-offs final
6	Slovan Liberec	35	12	10	13	34	32	+2	46	

Source: Fortuna liga, Soccerway
Rules for classification: 1) Points; 2) Head-to-head points; 3) Head-to-head goal difference; 4) Head-to-head goals scored; 5) Goal difference; 6) Goals scored; 7) Fair-play ranking; 8) Draw.
(C) Champions

===== Results summary =====
Overall								Home						Away					
Pld	W	D	L	GF	GA	GD	Pts	W	D	L	GF	GA	GD	W	D	L	GF	GA	GD
5	3	0	2	7	6	+1	9	3	0	0	6	0	+6	0	0	2	1	6	−5

Source: See results

===== Results by round =====
Round	1	2	3	4	5
Ground	H	H	A	H	A
Result	W	W	L	W	L
Position	3	3	3	3	3

Source: See results
A = Away; H = Home; W = Win; D = Draw; L = Loss

===== Matches =====
4 May 2019 1	Sparta Prague	3–0	Baník Ostrava	Prague
17:30 CEST (UTC+2)	Drchal 29'; Nhamoinesu (yellow card) 34'; Sáček (yellow card) 41'; Karlsson 51' (pen.); Zahustel (yellow card) 77'; Hložek 90+5'	Report	Procházka (yellow card) 85'	Stadium: Generali Arena; Attendance: 11,423; Referee: Pavel Královec

11 May 2019 2	Sparta Prague	1–0	Slovan Liberec	Prague
20:00 CEST (UTC+2)	Nhamoinesu 6'; Ćivić (yellow card) 64'	Report	Malinský (yellow card) 21'; Kozák (yellow card) 24'; Fukala (yellow card) 25'; Dorley (yellow card) 51'; Breite (yellow card) 90+3'	Stadium: Generali Arena; Attendance: 7,267; Referee: Marek Nenadál

15 May 2019 3	Viktoria Plzeň	4–0	Sparta Prague	Plzeň
17:30 CEST (UTC+2)	Hořava 23'; Kovařík 43', 59'; Kopic 61'; Hejda (yellow card) 79'	Report		Stadium: Doosan Arena; Attendance: 8,842; Referee: Emanuel Marek

19 May 2019 4	Sparta Prague	2–0	Jablonec	Prague
15:00 CEST (UTC+2)	Štetina 12'; Kanga (yellow card) 45+2'; Zahustel 57'	Report	Hovorka (red card) 40'	Stadium: Generali Arena; Attendance: 7,125; Referee: Jiří Houdek

26 May 2019 5	Slavia Prague	2–1	Sparta Prague	Prague
17:00 CEST (UTC+2)	Souček 7', (yellow card) 58'; Băluță (yellow card) 45+1', (goal) 50'; Stoch (yellow card) 90'	Report	Kanga 21' (pen.), (yellow card) 22'; Plavšić (yellow card) 79'	Stadium: Sinobo Stadium; Attendance: 17,986; Referee: Ondřej Berka

=== Czech Cup ===
2 October 2018 Third round	Slavoj Polná	1–4	Sparta Prague	Polná
15:30 CEST (UTC+2)	Fadrný (yellow card) 62'; Čížek 78'; Urbánek (yellow card) 85'	Report	Pulkrab 22'; Vácha (yellow card) 27'; Wiesner (yellow card) 38'; Radaković 74'; Šural 88'; Hložek 90+1'	Stadium: Městský stadion Attendance: 3,450; Referee: Martin Nenadál

28 November 2018 Fourth round	Opava	0–0 (3–4 p)	Sparta Prague	Opava
15:45 CET (UTC+1)	Hrabina (yellow card) 45+2'; Kayamba (yellow card) 82'; Janetzký (yellow card) 84'	Report	Frýdek (yellow card) 45+2'; Wiesner (yellow card) 58'; Mebrahtu (yellow card) 85'	Stadium: Stadion v Městských sadech Attendance: 6,792; Referee: Jan Jílek
	Penalties
	Kuzmanović (penalty missed); Simerský (penalty scored); Kayamba (penalty scored); Jursa (penalty missed); Smola (penalty scored); Schaffartzik (penalty missed)		(penalty missed) Stanciu; (penalty scored) Kanga; (penalty missed) Chipciu; (penalty scored) Pulkrab; (penalty scored) Mebrahtu; (penalty scored) Frýdek

2 April 2019 Quarter-finals	Teplice	2–2 (a.e.t.) (2–4 p)	Sparta Prague	Teplice
17:00 CEST (UTC+2)	Trubač (yellow card) 28'; Soungole (yellow card) 45+1'; Bezdička (yellow card) 71'; Jeřábek 90+2', (yellow card) 104'; Hošek 100'; Vondrášek (yellow card) 102'; Diviš (yellow card) 120'	Report	Nhamoinesu (yellow card) 58'; Plavšić 75' (yellow card) 85'; Frýdek (yellow card) 109'; Kanga (yellow card) 120'; Drchal 120+1'	Stadium: Na Stínadlech; Attendance: 7,361; Referee: Pavel Orel
	Penalties
	Hora (penalty scored); Kučera (penalty missed); Ljevaković (penalty missed); Jindráček (penalty scored)		(penalty scored) Zahustel; (penalty scored) Frýdek; (penalty missed) Plavšić; (penalty scored) Drchal; (penalty scored) Kanga

24 April 2019 Semi-finals	Slavia Prague	3–0	Sparta Prague	Prague
19:30 CEST (UTC+2)	Souček 25', 45+3', (yellow card) 45+5'; Masopust 51'; van Buren (yellow card) 71'; Bořil (yellow card) 87'	Report	Nhamoinesu (yellow card) 27'; Kanga (yellow card) 45+5'; Frýdek (yellow card) 45+5'; Tetteh (yellow card) 86'	Stadium: Sinobo Stadium; Attendance: 16,246; Referee: Ondřej Pechanec

=== UEFA Europa League ===
==== Qualifying rounds ====
===== Second qualifying round =====
26 July 2018 First leg	Spartak Subotica (Serbia)	2–0	(Czech Republic) Sparta Prague	Novi Sad, Serbia
20:45 CEST (UTC+2)	Ćalasan 8'; Jočić (yellow card) 45'; Shimura (yellow card) 48'; Đuričin 57'	Report	Šural (yellow card) 51'; Frýdek (yellow card) 87'	Stadium: Stadion Karađorđe; Attendance: 4,000; Referee: Paweł Raczkowski (Poland)

2 August 2018 Second leg	Sparta Prague (Czech Republic)	2–1 (2–3 agg.)	(Serbia) Spartak Subotica	Prague, Czech Republic
19:00 CEST (UTC+2)	Šural 28', (yellow card) 74' (red card) 90+8'; Kanga (yellow card) 61'; Plavšić 66', (yellow card) 67'; Chipciu (yellow card) 88'; Tetteh (yellow card) 88'	Report	Marčić (yellow card) 55' (yellow-red card) 82'; Čečarić 75' (pen.); Đenić (yellow card) 90'; Perić (yellow card) 90+4'	Stadium: Generali Arena; Attendance: 12,068; Referee: Sebastian Coltescu (Romania)

== Statistics ==
=== Goals ===
Goal	Name	League	Cup	Europe
12	Guélor Kanga	12	0	0
11	Benjamin Tetteh	11	0	0
5	Josef Šural	3	1	1
4	Nicolae Stanciu	4	0	0
4	Václav Drchal	3	1	0
4	Adam Hložek	3	1	0
4	Matěj Pulkrab	3	1	0
4	Srđan Plavšić	2	1	1
3	David Moberg Karlsson	3	0	0
2	Costa	2	0	0
2	Martin Frýdek	2	0	0
2	Lukáš Štetina	2	0	0
2	Ondřej Zahustel	2	0	0
2	Uroš Radaković	1	1	0
1	Martin Hašek	1	0	0
1	Matěj Hanousek	1	0	0
1	Alexandru Chipciu	1	0	0
1	Michal Sáček	1	0	0
1	Vukadin Vukadinović	1	0	0

=== Assists ===
A	Name	League	Cup	Europe
7	Guélor Kanga	4	3	0
6	Nicolae Stanciu	6	0	0
4	David Moberg Karlsson	4	0	0
3	Martin Frýdek	2	0	1
3	Srđan Plavšić	2	0	1
2	Eldar Ćivić	2	0	0
2	Bořek Dočkal	2	0	0
2	Matěj Hanousek	2	0	0
2	Adam Hložek	2	0	0
2	Alexandru Chipciu	2	0	0
2	Michal Sáček	2	0	0
1	Golgol Mebrahtu	1	0	0
1	Benjamin Tetteh	1	0	0
1	Vukadin Vukadinović	1	0	0
1	Lukáš Štetina	0	1	0
1	Lukáš Vácha	0	1	0

=== Yellow cards ===
Yellow card	Name	League	Cup	Europe
17	Guélor Kanga	14	2	1
12	Martin Frýdek	8	3	1
9	Costa	7	2	0
7	Srđan Plavšić	5	1	1
6	Josef Šural	4	0	2
5	Alexandru Chipciu	4	0	1
5	Benjamin Tetteh	3	1	1
4	Eldar Ćivić	4	0	0
4	Michal Sáček	4	0	0
4	Nicolae Stanciu	4	0	0
4	Lukáš Štetina	4	0	0
3	Florin Niță	3	0	0
3	Uroš Radaković	3	0	0
3	Ondřej Zahustel	3	0	0
3	Lukáš Vácha	2	1	0
2	Semih Kaya	2	0	0
2	Bogdan Vătăjelu	2	0	0
2	Vukadin Vukadinović	2	0	0
2	Tomáš Wiesner	0	2	0
1	Václav Drchal	1	0	0
1	Martin Hašek	1	0	0
1	Václav Kadlec	1	0	0
1	David Moberg Karlsson	1	0	0
1	Dominik Plechatý	1	0	0
1	Matěj Pulkrab	1	0	0
1	Golgol Mebrahtu	0	1	0

=== Red cards ===
Red card	Name	League	Cup	Europe
1	Eldar Ćivić	1	0	0
1	Guélor Kanga	1	0	0
1	Nicolae Stanciu	1	0	0
1	Lukáš Štetina	1	0	0
1	Josef Šural	0	0	1
