= 2019–20 AC Sparta Prague season =

Sparta Prague
2019–20 season
- President: Daniel Křetínský
- Head coach: Václav Kotal
- Stadium: Generali Arena
- Czech First League: 3rd
- Czech Cup: Winners
- UEFA Europa League: Third qualifying round
- Top goalscorer: League: Guélor Kanga (12); All: Guélor Kanga (15)
Home colours	Away colours

The 2019–20 AC Sparta Prague season was the club's 125th season in existence and the 27th consecutive season in the top flight of Czech football. In addition to the domestic league, AC Sparta Prague participated in this season's editions of the Czech Cup and the UEFA Europa League. The season covered the period from 1 July 2019 to 8 July 2020.

== Players ==
=== Current squad ===
As of 18 January 2020.

Note: Flags indicate national team as defined under FIFA eligibility rules; some limited exceptions apply. Players may hold more than one non-FIFA nationality.

No.	Pos.	Nation	Player
1	GK	ROU	Florin Niță
2	DF	TUR	Semih Kaya
6	FW	CZE	Martin Graiciar (on loan from Fiorentina)
7	MF	SWE	David Moberg Karlsson
9	MF	GAB	Guélor Kanga
10	MF	CZE	Bořek Dočkal
11	MF	ISR	Tal Ben Chaim
13	DF	CZE	David Lischka
15	DF	CZE	Matěj Hanousek
16	MF	CZE	Michal Sáček
17	MF	CZE	Martin Frýdek
18	FW	CZE	Libor Kozák
19	DF	SVK	Lukáš Štetina
20	FW	CZE	Adam Hložek

No.	Pos.	Nation	Player
22	MF	SRB	Srđan Plavšić
24	FW	CZE	Václav Drchal
25	MF	CZE	Michal Trávník
26	DF	ZIM	Costa Nhamoinesu
27	DF	CZE	Filip Panák
29	GK	CZE	Milan Heča
30	FW	GHA	Benjamin Tetteh
32	DF	NOR	Andreas Vindheim
33	DF	SVK	Dávid Hancko (on loan from Fiorentina)
35	GK	CZE	David Bičík
36	MF	CZE	Adam Karabec
37	MF	CZE	Ladislav Krejčí
40	MF	CMR	Georges Mandjeck

=== Out on loan ===
Note: Flags indicate national team as defined under FIFA eligibility rules; some limited exceptions apply. Players may hold more than one non-FIFA nationality.

No.	Pos.	Nation	Player
—	GK	CZE	Hugo Jan Bačkovský (at Vlašim)
—	GK	CZE	Vojtěch Vorel (at FK Senica)
—	DF	CZE	David Březina (at Viktoria Žižkov)
—	DF	SRB	Filip Maksić (at Viktoria Žižkov)
—	DF	CZE	Dominik Plechatý (at FK Jablonec)
—	DF	CZE	Jan Pavlík (at Vysočina Jihlava)
—	DF	SRB	Uroš Radaković (at FC Orenburg)
28	DF	CZE	Ondřej Zahustel (at 1. FC Slovácko)
—	MF	CZE	Christián Frýdek (at Hradec Králové)

No.	Pos.	Nation	Player
—	MF	CZE	Filip Havelka (at České Budějovice)
—	MF	CZE	Jiří Kulhánek (at České Budějovice)
—	MF	BIH	Zinedin Mustedanagić (at Sarajevo)
—	MF	CZE	Tomáš Wiesner (at Mladá Boleslav)
—	FW	CZE	David Čapek (at Viktoria Žižkov)
—	FW	CZE	Ondřej Novotný (at MFK Ružomberok)
—	FW	CZE	Matěj Pulkrab (at Bohemians 1905)
—	FW	CZE	Lukáš Juliš (at SK Sigma Olomouc)
—	MF	CZE	Filip Souček (at SFC Opava)
—	MF	CZE	Jan Fortelný (at Jihlava)

== Pre-season and friendlies ==
Win Draw Loss

5 July 2019 Friendly	LASK (Austria)	1–0	(Czech Republic) Sparta Prague	Leonfelden, Austria
12:30 CEST (UTC+2)				Stadium: Sportplatz Bad Leonfelden

6 February 2020 Friendly	Malmö FF (Sweden)	2–0	(Czech Republic) Sparta Prague	Marbella, Spain
16:00 CET (UTC+1)	Antonsson 61'; Berget 77'	Report		Stadium: Marbella Football Center

== Competitions ==
=== Overview ===
Competition	First match	Last match	Starting round	Final position	Record							
Competition	First match	Last match	Starting round	Final position	Pld	W	D	L	GF	GA	GD	Win %
Czech First League	14 July 2019	8 July 2020	Matchday 1	3rd	35	17	9	9	66	40	+26	48.57
Czech Cup	25 September 2019	1 July 2020	Third round	Winners	5	5	0	0	15	3	+12	100.00
UEFA Europa League	8 August 2019	15 August 2019	Third qualifying round	Third qualifying round	2	0	1	1	3	4	−1	0.00
Total					42	22	10	10	84	47	+37	52.38

Source: Soccerway

=== Czech First League ===
==== Regular stage ====
===== League table =====
Pos	Team	Pld	W	D	L	GF	GA	GD	Pts	Qualification or relegation
1	Slavia Prague	30	22	6	2	58	10	+48	72	Qualification for the championship group
2	Viktoria Plzeň	30	20	6	4	60	22	+38	66	Qualification for the championship group
3	Sparta Prague	30	14	8	8	55	35	+20	50	Qualification for the championship group
4	Jablonec	30	14	7	9	46	41	+5	49	Qualification for the championship group
5	Slovan Liberec	30	14	5	11	50	38	+12	47	Qualification for the championship group

Source: Fortuna Liga
Rules for classification: 1) Points; 2) Head-to-head points; 3) Head-to-head goal difference; 4) Head-to-head goals scored; 5) Goal difference; 6) Goals scored; 7) Fair-play ranking; 8) Draw.

===== Results summary =====
Overall								Home						Away					
Pld	W	D	L	GF	GA	GD	Pts	W	D	L	GF	GA	GD	W	D	L	GF	GA	GD
30	14	8	8	55	35	+20	50	8	3	4	34	19	+15	6	5	4	21	16	+5

Source: See results

===== Results by round =====
Round	1	2	3	4	5	6	7	8	9	10	11	12	13	14	15	16	17	18	19	20	21	22	23	24	25	26	27	28	29	30
Ground	H	H	A	H	A	H	A	H	A	H	A	H	A	H	A	A	H	A	H	A	H	A	H	A	H	A	H	A	H	A
Result	L	W	D	W	L	W	L	D	W	L	L	W	D	W	W	D	D	W	W	D	L	L	D	D	L	W	W	W	W	W
Position	15	8	7	4	7	5	7	7	6	7	9	7	7	7	6	5	5	4	3	4	5	6	7	9	9	6	5	5	4	3

Source: See results
A = Away; H = Home; W = Win; D = Draw; L = Loss

==== Matches ====
14 July 2019 1	Sparta Prague	0–2	Slovácko	Prague
19:00 CEST (UTC+2)	Plavšić (yellow card) 80'	Report	Kalabiška 19', (yellow card) 73'; Daníček 30', (yellow card) 47'; Dvořák (yellow card) 33'; Navrátil (yellow card) 75'	Stadium: Stadion Letná; Attendance: 14,155; Referee: Jiří Houdek

20 July 2019 2	Sparta Prague	2–0	Jablonec	Prague
19:30 CEST (UTC+2)	Hložek 62'; Tetteh (yellow card) 76'; Kanga 83'	Report	Kratochvíl (yellow card) 72'	Stadium: Stadion Letná; Attendance: 10,864; Referee: Miroslav Zelinka

29 July 2019 3	Dynamo České Budějovice	2–2	Sparta Prague	České Budějovice
18:00 CEST (UTC+2)	Schranz 4'; Čavoš (yellow card) 27'; Kladrubský 45+8' (pen.), (yellow card) 87'; Ledecký (yellow card) 83'; Brandner (yellow card) 84'; Provod (yellow card) 90+3'	Report	Plavšić (yellow card) 42'; Hanousek (yellow card) 45+7'; Kanga 49'; Tetteh 82'	Stadium: Stadion Střelecký ostrov Attendance: 6,681; Referee: Karel Hrubeš

4 August 2019 4	Sparta Prague	3–0	1. FK Příbram	Prague
19:00 CEST (UTC+2)	Costa 28'; Kanga 39' (pen.), 80' (pen.)	Report	Tregler (yellow card) 1'; Cmiljanović (yellow card) 32'; Šimek (yellow card) 38'; Zeman (penalty missed) 42'; Voltr (red card) 84'	Stadium: Stadion Letná; Attendance: 11,007; Referee: Ondřej Pechanec

11 August 2019 5	Mladá Boleslav	4–3	Sparta Prague	Mladá Boleslav
19:00 CEST (UTC+2)	Mešanović 17' (pen.), 38', 76', (yellow card) 56'; Budínský 90+3'	Report	Hancko 29'; Hašek (yellow card) 67'; Tetteh 74'; Kozák 87'	Stadium: Lokotrans Aréna; Attendance: 5,000; Referee: Pavel Franěk

18 August 2019 6	Sparta Prague	2–0	Baník Ostrava	Prague
15:00 CEST (UTC+2)	Hašek 10', 39'; Kozák (yellow card) 28'	Report	Procházka (yellow card) 14'; Smola (yellow card) 28'; Fillo (yellow card) 34'; Dyjan (yellow card) 63'	Stadium: Stadion Letná; Attendance: 14,123; Referee: Ondřej Ginzel

25 August 2019 7	Slovan Liberec	3–1	Sparta Prague	Liberec
19:00 CEST (UTC+2)	Kacharaba (yellow card) 30'; Mikula (yellow card) 45'; Malinský 45+2', 80', (yellow card) 48'; Alibekov (yellow card) 50'; Potočný 58' (pen.)	Report	Radaković (yellow card) 8'; Hancko (yellow card) 45+2'; Hložek 63'; Krejčí (yellow card) 90+2'; Hašek (yellow card) 90+7'	Stadium: Stadion u Nisy; Attendance: 8,765; Referee: Pavel Julínek

1 September 2019 8	Sparta Prague	3–3	Sigma Olomouc	Prague
19:00 CEST (UTC+2)	Kozák 20', (yellow card) 84'; Hložek 52'; Kanga 57', (yellow card) 78'; Tetteh (yellow card) 90+2'	Report	Houska (yellow card) 16'; Hála 28'; Plšek 36', 74'; Reichl (yellow card) 90+3'	Stadium: Stadion Letná; Attendance: 9,407; Referee: Zbyněk Proske

15 September 2019 9	Fastav Zlín	0–2	Sparta Prague	Zlín
15:00 CEST (UTC+2)	Giorgadze (yellow card) 62'; Folprecht (yellow card) 73'; Džafić (yellow card) 90+5'	Report	Tetteh 5'; Kanga 19' (pen.)	Stadium: Letná Stadium; Attendance: 5,650; Referee: Jiří Houdek

22 September 2019 10	Sparta Prague	0–3	Slavia Prague	Prague
18:00 CEST (UTC+2)	Kanga (yellow card) 43'; Tetteh (red card) 82'	Report	Souček 19' (pen.); Hušbauer (yellow card) 31' (yellow-red card) 66'; Masopust (yellow card) 40', (goal) 89'; Bořil (yellow card) 43'; Sáček 55' (o.g.); Hovorka (yellow card) 68'; Škoda (yellow card) 89'	Stadium: Stadion Letná; Attendance: 17,292; Referee: Miroslav Zelinka

29 September 2019 11	Viktoria Plzeň	1–0	Sparta Prague	Plzeň
18:00 CEST (UTC+2)	Krmenčík 46'; Brabec (yellow card) 82'; Chorý (yellow card) 86'	Report	Trávník (yellow card) 85'; Plavšić (yellow card) 89'; Graiciar (yellow card) 90+3'	Stadium: Doosan Arena; Attendance: 11,536; Referee: Ondřej Pechanec

5 October 2019 12	Sparta Prague	4–0	Karviná	Prague
19:00 CEST (UTC+2)	Kozák 14', 51', 59'; Hancko (yellow card) 31'; Kanga (yellow card) 45+2', (goal) 85'; Sáček (yellow card) 48'; Hašek (yellow card) 90'	Report	Rundić (yellow card) 12'; Petráň (yellow card) 44' (yellow-red card) 61'; Hanousek (yellow card) 58'	Stadium: Stadion Letná; Attendance: 7,181; Referee: Pavel Franěk

20 October 2019 13	Teplice	1–1	Sparta Prague	Teplice
18:00 CEST (UTC+2)	Čmovš (yellow card) 30'; Vondrášek (yellow card) 50'; Kodeš (yellow card) 57'; Mareš (yellow card) 73'; Řezníček 90'	Report	Plavšić (yellow card) 34'; Trávník (yellow card) 52'; Kaya 68'	Stadium: Na Stínadlech; Attendance: 12,362; Referee: Jan Machálek

26 October 2019 14	Sparta Prague	4–0	Bohemians 1905	Prague
17:00 CEST (UTC+2)	Kozák 4'; Kanga 31'; Hašek 53'; Trávník (yellow card) 54'; Kaya 71'	Report	Jindřišek (yellow card) 45+1'	Stadium: Stadion Letná; Attendance: 12,157; Referee: Zbyněk Proske

3 November 2019 15	Opava	0–1	Sparta Prague	Opava
17:00 CET (UTC+1)	Žídek (yellow card) 71'; Juřena (yellow card) 90+4'	Report	Vindheim 10'; Kaya (yellow card) 60'; Kanga (yellow card) 66'	Stadium: Stadion v Městských sadech Attendance: 4,566; Referee: Miroslav Zelinka

9 November 2019 16	Jablonec	2–2	Sparta Prague	Jablonec nad Nisou
17:00 CET (UTC+1)	Jovović (yellow card) 45'; Považanec (yellow card) 45+2'; Matoušek 47'; Krob (yellow card) 56'; Kratochvíl (yellow card) 59'; Chramosta 74'	Report	Kozák 4'; Frýdek 19', (yellow card) 64'; Vindheim (yellow card) 38'; Kozák (yellow card) 62'; Krejčí (yellow card) 75'; Hanousek (yellow card) 89'	Stadium: Stadion Střelnice; Attendance: 4,103; Referee: Pavel Královec

22 November 2019 17	Sparta Prague	3–3	Dynamo České Budějovice	Prague
18:00 CET (UTC+1)	Kanga 35' (pen.); Mandjeck (yellow card) 40'; Plavšić 59'; Trávník (yellow card) 67'; Lischka (yellow card) 72'; Tetteh 80'	Report	Schranz 7'; Novák (yellow card) 34'; Čolić 42'; Brandner (yellow card) 45+1'; Mršić (yellow card) 53'; Ekpai (yellow card) 76'; Ledecký 77'; Schranz (yellow card) 82'; Drobný (yellow card) 90+5'	Stadium: Stadion Letná; Attendance: 10,057; Referee: Emanuel Marek

30 November 2019 18	1. FK Příbram	0–1	Sparta Prague	Příbram
17:00 CET (UTC+1)	Alvir (yellow card) 16'; Rezek (yellow card) 20'; Drame (yellow card) 79'; Tregler (yellow card) 90+4'	Report	Krejčí (yellow card) 24'; Hašek 30'; Heča (yellow card) 67'; Frýdek (yellow card) 82'	Stadium: Na Litavce; Attendance: 4,865; Referee: Ondřej Pechanec

8 December 2019 19	Sparta Prague	5–2	Mladá Boleslav	Prague
17:00 CET (UTC+1)	Sáček 2'; Hašek 8'; Krejčí (yellow card) 51'; Kanga 54'; Tetteh 71'; Hložek (yellow card) 76'; Hubínek 80' (o.g.)	Report	Budínský 26'; Pudil (yellow card) 35'; Bucha 53'; Komlichenko (yellow card) 68' (yellow-red card) 84'; Matějovský (yellow card) 74'; Ladra (yellow card) 78'; Tatayev (yellow card) 82'	Stadium: Stadion Letná; Attendance: 9,573; Referee: Pavel Rejžek

14 December 2019 20	Baník Ostrava	0–0	Sparta Prague	Ostrava
17:00 CET (UTC+1)	Jirásek (yellow card) 53'; Fleišman (yellow card) 61'; Stronati (yellow card) 90+2'	Report	Frýdek (yellow card) 58'; Sáček (yellow card) 65'; Kanga (yellow card) 77'	Stadium: Městský stadion Attendance: 13,535; Referee: Miroslav Zelinka

15 February 2020 21	Sparta Prague	0–2	Slovan Liberec	Prague
17:00 CET (UTC+1)	Frýdek (yellow card) 45+2'	Report	Mara (yellow card) 33'; Hromada (yellow card) 38'; Kuchta (yellow card) 58'; Malinský 77', 90+4', (yellow card) 77'; Karafiát (yellow card) 84'; Nguyen (yellow card) 90+2'; Rondić (yellow card) 90+3'	Stadium: Stadion Letná; Attendance: 12,236; Referee: Ondřej Pechanec

23 February 2020 22	Sigma Olomouc	1–0	Sparta Prague	Olomouc
17:00 CET (UTC+1)	Chytil 27'; Yunis (yellow card) 78'; Greššák (yellow card) 87'; Houska (yellow card) 90+4'; Sladký (yellow card) 90+4'	Report	Vindheim (yellow card) 76'; Hancko (yellow card) 83'	Stadium: Andrův stadion Attendance: 7,456; Referee: Pavel Královec

29 February 2020 23	Sparta Prague	2–2	Fastav Zlín	Prague
17:00 CET (UTC+1)	Mandjeck (red card) 28'; Štetina (yellow card) 52'; Karlsson 53'; Kozák 88'	Report	Bartošák (yellow card) 41'; Poznar 67'; Matejov (yellow card) 79', (goal) 90'; Janetzký (yellow card) 90+4'	Stadium: Stadion Letná; Attendance: 9,007; Referee: Pavel Orel

8 March 2020 24	Slavia Prague	1–1	Sparta Prague	Prague
17:00 CET (UTC+01:00)	Traoré (yellow card) 13'; Olayinka (yellow card) 32'; Musa 90+2', (yellow card) 90+3'; Bořil (yellow card) 90+4'	Report	Karabec (yellow card) 11'; Štetina (yellow card) 30'; Dočkal (yellow card) 68'; Tetteh 80'	Stadium: Sinobo Stadium; Attendance: 19,370; Referee: Pavel Franek

27 May 2020 25	Sparta Prague	1–2	Viktoria Plzeň	Prague
20:00 CEST (UTC+2)	Costa (yellow card) 81'; Krejčí (yellow card) 83'; Karlsson 87'; Štetina (yellow card) 90+1'; Kozák (yellow card) 90+7'; Kanga (yellow card) 90+7'	Report	Kalvach (yellow card) 22', (goal) 26'; Limberský (yellow card) 38'; Řezník (yellow card) 49'; Beauguel 52'	Stadium: Stadion Letná; Attendance: 0 Referee: Ondřej Berka

31 May 2020 26	Karviná	1–4	Sparta Prague	Karviná
18:00 CEST (UTC+2)	Ndefe (yellow card) 23'; Lingr 33', (yellow card) 44'; Rundić (yellow card) 84'	Report	Krejčí (yellow card) 21'; Štetina (yellow card) 44'; Karlsson 49'; Hložek 56'; Dočkal 64'; Karabec 90+3'	Stadium: Městský stadion Attendance: 25; Referee: Miroslav Zelinka

3 June 2020 27	Sparta Prague	3–0	Teplice	Prague
20:00 CEST (UTC+2)	Kozák 21', 41'; Kanga 25' (pen.); Krejčí (yellow card) 61'	Report	Kučera (yellow card) 40'; Čmovš (yellow card) 47'	Stadium: Stadion Letná; Attendance: 120; Referee: Petr Hocek

6 June 2020 28	Bohemians 1905	0–1	Sparta Prague	Prague
20:00 CEST (UTC+2)	Mosquera (yellow card) 17'; Hronek (yellow card) 28'; Osmančík (yellow card) 52'; Levin (yellow card) 78'; Vaníček (yellow card) 87'	Report	Štetina (yellow card) 35'; Dočkal (yellow card) 58'; Tetteh 84'	Stadium: Ďolíček; Attendance: 125; Referee: Zbyněk Proske

10 June 2020 29	Sparta Prague	2–0	Opava	Prague
18:00 CEST (UTC+2)	Kozák 11'; Trávník (yellow card) 26'; Hancko (yellow card) 40'; Frýdek 71'; Štetina (yellow card) 85'	Report	Žídek (yellow card) 44'	Stadium: Stadion Letná; Attendance: 300; Referee: Emanuel Marek

14 June 2020 30	Slovácko	0–2	Sparta Prague	Uherské Hradiště
17:00 CEST (UTC+2)	Divíšek (yellow card) 61'	Report	Sáček (yellow card) 26'; Vindheim 65'; Kanga 79'	Stadium: Městský fotbalový stadion Miroslava Valenty; Attendance: 300; Referee: Pavel Franek

==== Championship group ====
===== League table =====
Pos	Team	Pld	W	D	L	GF	GA	GD	Pts	Qualification
1	Slavia Prague (C)	35	26	7	2	69	12	+57	85	Qualification for the Champions League play-off round
2	Viktoria Plzeň	35	23	7	5	68	24	+44	76	Qualification for the Champions League second qualifying round
3	Sparta Prague	35	17	9	9	66	40	+26	60	Qualification for the Europa League group stage
4	Jablonec	35	14	9	12	48	52	−4	51	Qualification for the Europa League second qualifying round
5	Slovan Liberec (O)	35	15	6	14	55	51	+4	51	Qualification for the Europa League play-offs final
6	Baník Ostrava	35	12	11	12	47	43	+4	47	

Rules for classification: 1) Total points; 2) Points earned in regular season; 3) Head-to-head points (regular season); 4) Head-to-head goal difference (regular season); 5) Head-to-head goals scored (regular season); 5) Goal difference (all matches); 6) Goals scored (all matches); 7) Fair-play ranking; 8) Draw.
(C) Champions; (O) Play-off winners

===== Results summary =====
Overall								Home						Away					
Pld	W	D	L	GF	GA	GD	Pts	W	D	L	GF	GA	GD	W	D	L	GF	GA	GD
5	3	1	1	11	5	+6	10	3	0	0	10	3	+7	0	1	1	1	2	−1

Source: See results

===== Results by round =====
Round	1	2	3	4	5
Ground	H	H	A	H	A
Result	W	W	L	W	D
Position	3	3	3	3	3

Source: See results
A = Away; H = Home; W = Win; D = Draw; L = Loss

===== Matches =====
20 June 2020 1	Sparta Prague	4–1	Slovan Liberec	Prague
17:30 CEST (UTC+2)	Hancko 9'; Sáček 43'; Nguyen 75', 90+3' (o.g.); Trávník (yellow card) 77'	Report	Frýdek 29' (o.g.); Malinský (yellow card) 51'; Băluță (yellow card) 52'; Hromada 74'	Stadium: Stadion Letná; Attendance: 1,870; Referee: Petr Ardeleánu

23 June 2020 2	Sparta Prague	3–2	Baník Ostrava	Prague
20:00 CEST (UTC+2)	Hložek 25', 26'; Kozák (yellow card) 29', (goal) 33'; Dočkal (yellow card) 62'; Krejčí (yellow card) 90+6'	Report	Potočný 8'; Reiter (yellow card) 23'; Laštůvka (yellow card) 26'; Jánoš (yellow card) 45'; Kuzmanović (yellow card) 51', (goal) 63' (pen.); Procházka (yellow card) 69'; Baroš (yellow card) 90+1'; Stronati (yellow card) 90+1'; Smola (yellow card) 90+7'	Stadium: Stadion Letná; Attendance: 3,728; Referee: Tomáš Klíma

28 June 2020 3	Viktoria Plzeň	2–1	Sparta Prague	Plzeň
16:30 CEST (UTC+2)	Kayamba (yellow card) 34'; Chorý 56'; Mihálik 65'; Kopic (red card) 85'	Report	Drchal (yellow card) 40'; Vindheim (yellow card) 83'; Karlsson 88'	Stadium: Doosan Arena; Attendance: 2,925; Referee: Pavel Orel

5 July 2020 4	Sparta Prague	3–0	Jablonec	Prague
17:00 CEST (UTC+2)	Hložek 3'; Kozák 48', 62'; Sáček (yellow card) 54'	Report	Sýkora (yellow card) 84'; Hämäläinen (yellow card) 90+1'	Stadium: Stadion Letná; Attendance: 3,700; Referee: Pavel Rejžek

8 July 2020 5	Slavia Prague	0–0	Sparta Prague	Prague
18:00 CEST (UTC+2)	Bořil (yellow card) 27'; Stanciu (yellow card) 67'; Masopust (yellow card) 78'	Report	Štetina (yellow card) 27'; Dočkal (yellow card) 29'; Kozák (yellow card) 46'; Krejčí (yellow card) 67'	Stadium: Sinobo Stadium; Attendance: 4,700; Referee: Ondej Berka

=== Czech Cup ===
25 September 2019 Third round	Vysočina Jihlava	1–2	Sparta Prague	Jihlava
17:00 CEST (UTC+2)	Smejkal 15'; Tijani (yellow card) 45+1'; Rezek (yellow card) 55'; Mikuš (yellow card) 87'; Smejkal (yellow card) 88'	Report	Kozák 13'; Hašek 86'	Stadium: Stadion v Jiráskově ulici Attendance: 3,676; Referee: Pavel Rejžek

30 October 2019 Fourth round	Dynamo České Budějovice	0–4	Sparta Prague	České Budějovice
17:00 CET (UTC+1)	Brandner (yellow card) 36'; Kladrubský (yellow card) 38'; Schranz (yellow card) 38'	Report	Hanousek 26', 61'; Kozák 38', 51'	Stadium: Stadion Střelecký ostrov Attendance: 6,117; Referee: Pavel Orel

4 March 2020 Quarter-finals	Sparta Prague	5–0	Baník Ostrava	Prague
18:00 CET (UTC+1)	Hancko 20'; Hložek (yellow card) 35', (goal) 81'; Tetteh 54'; Frýdek (yellow card) 61', (goal) 76'; Karlsson 62' (pen.); Krejčí (yellow card) 65'	Report	Potočný (yellow card) 16'; Reiter (yellow card) 59'; Šašinka (yellow card) 45+1' (yellow-red card) 60'; Stronati (yellow card) 61'	Stadium: Generali Arena; Attendance: 9,097; Referee: Ondřej Berka

17 June 2020 Semi-finals	Sparta Prague	2–1	Viktoria Plzeň	Prague
20:15 CEST (UTC+2)	Kanga 15' (pen.), (yellow card) 59'; Kozák 28'; Štetina (yellow card) 81'; Krejčí (yellow card) 81'	Report	Bucha (yellow card) 9'; Limberský (yellow card) 14'; Havel (yellow card) 80', (goal) 90'; Chorý (yellow card) 81'	Stadium: Generali Arena; Attendance: 1,951; Referee: Ondřej Pechanec

1 July 2020 Final	Slovan Liberec	1–2	Sparta Prague	Liberec
20:15 CEST (UTC+2)	Rondić (yellow card) 12' (yellow-red card) 89'; Pešek 50'; Knobloch (yellow card) 72'; Mikula (yellow card) 78'; Mara (yellow card) 90+4'	Report	Kanga (yellow card) 8', (goal) 73' (pen.); Frýdek (yellow card) 34'; Karlsson 66', (yellow card) 85'; Tetteh (yellow card) 78'; Heča (yellow card) 90+4'	Stadium: Stadion u Nisy; Attendance: 2,351; Referee: Pavel Královec

=== UEFA Europa League ===
==== Qualifying rounds ====
===== Third qualifying round =====
8 August 2019 First leg	Sparta Prague (Czech Republic)	2–2	(Turkey) Trabzonspor	Prague, Czech Republic
18:00 CEST (UTC+2)	Costa 16'; Niță (yellow card) 26'; Tetteh (yellow card) 56'; Trávník (yellow card) 67'; Kanga 68'	Report	Mikel (yellow card) 32'; Ömür (yellow card) 45'; Hüseyin (yellow card) 48'; Sosa (yellow card) 65'; Ekuban 84'; Sørloth 89'	Stadium: Stadion Letná; Attendance: 0 Referee: José Luis Munuera Montero (Spain)

15 August 2019 Second leg	Trabzonspor (Turkey)	2–1 (4–3 agg.)	(Czech Republic) Sparta Prague	Trabzon, Turkey
19:30 CEST (UTC+2)	Sørloth 11'; Parmak (yellow card) 41'; Mikel (yellow card) 81'; Novák 90+8'	Report	Plavšić (yellow card) 13' (yellow-red card) 88'; Krejčí (yellow card) 30'; Hložek 78'	Stadium: Şenol Güneş Stadium; Attendance: 34,462; Referee: Jakob Kehlet (Denmark)
