= 2021–22 AC Sparta Prague season =

Sparta Prague
2021–22 season
- President: Daniel Křetínský
- Head coach: Pavel Vrba
- Stadium: Stadion Letná
- Czech First League: 3rd
- Czech Cup: Runners-up
- UEFA Champions League: Third qualifying round
- UEFA Europa League: Group stage
- UEFA Europa Conference League: Knockout round play-offs
- Top goalscorer: League: Adam Hložek (9); All: Adam Hložek (12)
Home colours	Away colours

The 2021–22 season was the 128th season in the existence of AC Sparta Prague and the club's 29th consecutive season in the top flight of Czech football. In addition to the domestic league, Sparta Prague participated in this season's editions of the Czech Cup, the UEFA Champions League, the UEFA Europa League, and the UEFA Europa Conference League.

== Players ==
=== First-team squad ===
As of 17 January 2022

Note: Flags indicate national team as defined under FIFA eligibility rules; some limited exceptions apply. Players may hold more than one non-FIFA nationality.

No.	Pos.	Nation	Player
1	GK	ROU	Florin Niță
3	DF	CZE	Ondřej Čelůstka
4	DF	CZE	Adam Gabriel
6	MF	CZE	Filip Souček
7	FW	CZE	Tomáš Čvančara
8	MF	CZE	David Pavelka
9	MF	CZE	Ladislav Krejčí
10	MF	CZE	Bořek Dočkal (captain)
11	MF	BUL	Martin Minchev
16	MF	CZE	Michal Sáček
17	DF	DEN	Casper Højer Nielsen
18	FW	CZE	Matěj Pulkrab
20	FW	CZE	Adam Hložek

No.	Pos.	Nation	Player
21	MF	CZE	Jakub Pešek
22	MF	SVK	Lukáš Haraslín (on loan from Sassuolo)
24	MF	CZE	Matěj Polidar
27	DF	CZE	Filip Panák
28	DF	CZE	Tomáš Wiesner
29	GK	CZE	Milan Heča
33	DF	SVK	Dávid Hancko
36	MF	CZE	Adam Karabec
37	MF	CZE	Ladislav Krejčí II
39	FW	CZE	Lukáš Juliš
40	GK	CZE	František Kotek
41	DF	CZE	Martin Vitík
77	GK	SVK	Dominik Holec

=== Out on loan ===
Note: Flags indicate national team as defined under FIFA eligibility rules; some limited exceptions apply. Players may hold more than one non-FIFA nationality.

No.	Pos.	Nation	Player
—	GK	CZE	Hugo Jan Bačkovský (at Bohemians 1905)
—	GK	CZE	Vojtěch Vorel (at Dynamo České Budějovice)
—	MF	CZE	Filip Havelka (at Dynamo České Budějovice)
—	DF	CZE	Matěj Hanousek (at Wisła Kraków)
—	DF	CZE	Dominik Plechatý (at Slovan Liberec)
—	DF	SVK	Lukáš Štetina (at Slovan Liberec)
—	MF	CZE	Michal Trávník (at Kasımpaşa)
—	MF	CZE	Jan Fortelný (at FK Teplice)
—	FW	CZE	Václav Sejk (at FK Teplice)

No.	Pos.	Nation	Player
—	DF	NOR	Andreas Vindheim (at FC Schalke 04)
—	DF	CZE	Lukáš Hušek (at FK Varnsdorf)
—	DF	CZE	Filip Gedeon (at Ústí nad Labem)
—	DF	SVK	Kristián Flak (at Liptovský Mikuláš)
—	MF	CZE	Jiří Kulhánek (at Dukla Prague)
—	FW	CZE	Václav Drchal (at Dynamo Dresden)
—	FW	CZE	Ondřej Novotný (at 1. FK Příbram)
—	FW	CZE	Vojtěch Patrák (at Pardubice)

== Pre-season and friendlies ==
Win Draw Loss Fixtures

22 June 2021 Friendly	Sparta Prague (Czech Republic)	8–1	(Czech Republic) Sokol Hostouň	Prague, Czech Republic
17:30 CEST (UTC+2)				Stadium: TC Strahov (hřiště č. 1)

26 June 2021 Friendly	Sparta Prague (Czech Republic)	7–0	(Czech Republic) Dukla Prague	Prague, Czech Republic
11:00 CEST (UTC+2)				Stadium: TC Strahov (hřiště č. 1)

1 July 2021 Friendly	Sparta Prague (Czech Republic)	1–0	(Czech Republic) Líšeň	Prague, Czech Republic
14:00 CEST (UTC+2)				Stadium: TC Strahov (hřiště č. 1)
Note: four halves of 30 minutes.

6 July 2021 Friendly	Arsenal Tula (Russia)	1–4	(Czech Republic) Sparta Prague	Austria
15:00 CEST (UTC+2)

9 July 2021 Friendly	Wolfsberger AC (Austria)	3–2	(Czech Republic) Sparta Prague	Wolfsberg, Austria
17:00 CEST (UTC+2)

12 July 2021 Friendly	Sparta Prague (Czech Republic)	2–2	(Russia) Dynamo Moscow	Austria
14:00 CEST (UTC+2)

== Competitions ==
=== Overall record ===
Competition	First match	Last match	Starting round	Final position	Record							
Competition	First match	Last match	Starting round	Final position	Pld	W	D	L	GF	GA	GD	Win %
Czech First League	24 July 2021	15 May 2022	Matchday 1	3rd	35	22	7	6	71	38	+33	62.86
Czech Cup	22 September 2021	18 May 2022	Third round	Runners-up	5	4	0	1	12	6	+6	80.00
UEFA Champions League	21 July 2021	10 August 2021	Second qualifying round	Third qualifying round	4	1	0	3	4	7	−3	25.00
UEFA Europa League	16 September 2021	9 December 2021	Group stage	Group stage	6	2	1	3	6	9	−3	33.33
UEFA Europa League	17 February 2022	24 February 2022	Knockout round play-offs	Knockout round play-offs	2	0	0	2	1	3	−2	0.00
Total					52	29	8	15	94	63	+31	55.77

Source: Soccerway

=== Czech First League ===
==== Regular season ====
Pos	Team	Pld	W	D	L	GF	GA	GD	Pts	Qualification or relegation
1	Slavia Prague	30	23	4	3	71	19	+52	73	Qualification for the championship group
2	Viktoria Plzeň	30	22	6	2	53	19	+34	72	Qualification for the championship group
3	Sparta Prague	30	20	6	4	65	32	+33	66	Qualification for the championship group
4	Slovácko	30	18	5	7	50	30	+20	59	Qualification for the championship group
5	Baník Ostrava	30	14	9	7	54	39	+15	51	Qualification for the championship group

Source: Fortuna Liga
Rules for classification: 1) Points; 2) Head-to-head points; 3) Head-to-head goal difference; 4) Head-to-head goals scored; 5) Goal difference; 6) Goals scored; 7) Fair-play ranking; 8) Draw.

==== Results summary ====
Overall								Home						Away					
Pld	W	D	L	GF	GA	GD	Pts	W	D	L	GF	GA	GD	W	D	L	GF	GA	GD
35	22	7	6	72	40	+32	73	14	3	1	41	16	+25	8	4	5	31	24	+7

Source: Fortuna Liga

==== Results by round ====
Round	1	2	3	4	5	6	7	8	9	10	11	12	13	14	15	16	17	18	19	20	21	22	23	24	25	26	27	28	29	30	31	32	33	34	35
Ground	H	A	H	A	H	H	A	H	A	H	A	H	A	H	A	H	A	H	A	A	H	H	A	A	H	A	H	A	H	A	H	H	A	H	A
Result	W	W	W	D	W	W	L	D	W	W	W	W	D	W	L	W	W	W	W	D	D	W	L	D	W	W	W	W	W	L	W	D	L	L	W
Position	1	1	1	2	2	1	2	3	3	2	3	3	4	3	4	3	3	3	3	3	3	3	3	3	3	3	3	3	3	3	3	3	3	3	3

Updated to match(es) played on 15 May 2022. Source: Fortuna Liga
A = Away; H = Home; W = Win; D = Draw; L = Loss

==== Matches ====
24 July 2021 1	Sparta Prague	3–2	Sigma Olomouc	Prague
19:00 CEST (UTC+2)	Štetina (yellow card) 8'; Karlsson 12' (pen.), (yellow card) 57'; Wiesner (yellow card) 66'; Krejčí II 64'; Hubník 78' (o.g.); Pavelka (yellow card) 85'; Niță (yellow card) 90+4'	Report	Daněk 3'; Sedlák (yellow card) 85'; Vaněček (yellow card) 85'; González 90+2'	Stadium: Stadion Letná; Attendance: 7,235; Referee: Pavel Orel

31 July 2021 2	Slovan Liberec	0–5	Sparta Prague	Liberec
19:00 CEST (UTC+2)	Gebre Selassie (yellow card) 28' (yellow-red card) 52'; Chaluš (yellow card) 65'	Report	Pešek 25'; Hložek 62'; Karabec 65' (pen.); Krejčí 70'; Souček 79'	Stadium: Stadion u Nisy; Attendance: 5,000; Referee: Ondřej Berka

7 August 2021 3	Sparta Prague	2–0	Karviná	Prague
16:00 CEST (UTC+2)	Hložek 23'; Pavelka 78'	Report	Čmelík (yellow card) 72'	Stadium: Stadion Letná; Attendance: 5,136; Referee: (Czech Republic) Petr Hocek

14 August 2021 4	Bohemians 1905	1–1	Sparta Prague	Prague
19:00 CEST (UTC+2)	Dostál 45+2'; Necid (yellow card) 82'	Report	Pavelka 55'	Stadium: Ďolíček; Attendance: 3,905; Referee: (Czech Republic) Ondřej Pechanec

21 August 2021 5	Sparta Prague	4–0	Hradec Králové	Prague
19:00 CEST (UTC+2)	Hložek 53'; Pešek 66' 88'; Polidar 71'	Report	Král (yellow card) 18'; Kodeš (yellow card) 34'; Donát (yellow card) 55'; Štěpán Harazim (yellow card) 68'; Prekop (yellow card) 84'	Stadium: Stadion Letná; Attendance: 6,263; Referee: (Czech Republic) Jan Machálek

28 August 2021 6	Sparta Prague	1–0	České Budějovice	Prague
19:00 CEST (UTC+2)	Kancko 38'; Panák (yellow card) 88'	Report	Pavel Novák (yellow card) 68'; Škoda (yellow card) 83'; Talovyerov (yellow card) 85'; Mihálik (yellow card) 88'	Stadium: Stadion Letná; Attendance: 3,663; Referee: (Czech Republic) Pavel Franek

11 September 2021 7	Viktoria Plzeň	3–2	Sparta Prague	Plzeň
19:00 CEST (UTC+2)	Mosquera (yellow card) 16' (goal) 32'; Beauguel 18'; Janošek (yellow card) 29'; Sýkora 56'; Řezník (yellow card) 64'; Hybš (yellow card) 90+3'	Report	Moberg Karlsson 40'; Pavelka (yellow card) 66'; Štetina (yellow card) 82'; Drchal 87'	Stadium: Doosan Arena; Attendance: 10,584; Referee: (Czech Republic) Ondřej Berka

19 September 2021 8	Sparta Prague	1–1	Jablonec	Prague
16:00 CEST (UTC+2)	Drchal 4'; Pavelka (yellow card) 34'; Vindheim (yellow card) 52'; Moberg Karlsson (yellow card) 77'; Karabec (yellow card) 90+2'	Report	Zelený (yellow card) 6'; Čvančara (yellow card) 15' (goal) 48'; Kratochvíl (yellow card) 20'; Krob (yellow card) 44'; Kubista (yellow card) 53'; Houska (yellow card) 72'; Považanec (yellow card) 76'; Malínský (yellow card) 86'	Stadium: Stadion Letná; Attendance: 8,115; Referee: (Czech Republic) Pavel Orel

25 September 2021 9	Zlín	2–5	Sparta Prague	Zlín
19:00 CEST (UTC+2)	Chanturishvili (yellow card) 18'; Hrubý (yellow card) 22'; Dominik Simerský 41'; David Tkáč (yellow card) 45+2'; Vraštil (yellow card) 68'; Cedidla (yellow card) 79'; Poznar 90'	Report	Čelůstka 8'; Panák 45+1'; Pešek 57'; Hložek (yellow card) 76'; Dominik Simerský 81' (o.g.); Minchev 90+1'	Stadium: Letná Stadion; Attendance: 4,520; Referee: (Czech Republic) Jan Machálek

3 October 2021 10	Sparta Prague	1–0	Slavia Prague	Prague
19:00 CEST (UTC+2)	Pavelka (yellow card) 38'; Haraslín 42'; Dočkal (yellow card) 73'; Sáček (yellow card) 83'; Niță (yellow card) 90+3'	Report	Ousou (yellow card) 27' (yellow-red card) 41'; Kuchta (yellow card) 45'; Krmenčík (yellow card) 78'; Bah (yellow card) 82'	Stadium: Generali Česká pojišťovna Arena; Attendance: 17,093; Referee: (Czech Republic) Ondřej Berka

17 October 2021 11	Pardubice	2–4	Sparta Prague	Prague (Note: Pardubice continued playing their home matches in Ďolíček due to the rebuilding of their own stadium Pod Vinicí.)
19:00 CEST (UTC+2)	Cadu 55'; Červ (yellow card) 63'; Šejvl (yellow card) 76'; Huf 87'	Report	Minchev 20', 45+2'; Wiesner 28'; Pešek 60'	Stadium: Ďolíček; Attendance: 3,537; Referee: Ondřej Pechanec

24 October 2021 12	Sparta Prague	1–0	Mladá Boleslav	Prague
19:00 CEST (UTC+2)	Pavelka (yellow card) 44'; Dočkal (yellow card) 75'; Karabec (yellow card) 79'; Hložek 90+3'; Holec (yellow card) 90+4'	Report	Matějovský (yellow card) 43'; Jurásek (yellow card) 90+1'	Stadium: Generali Česká pojišťovna Arena; Attendance: 7,544; Referee: (Czech Republic) Pavel Julínek

31 October 2021 13	Baník Ostrava	2–2	Sparta Prague	Ostrava
15:00 CEST (UTC+2)	Kuzmanović (yellow card) 45+2'; Buchta 50'; Pokorný (yellow card) 73'; Tetour 88' (pen.); Sor (yellow card) 90+4'	Report	Pešek 31'; Čelůstka (yellow card) 45+2'; Hancko (yellow card) 60', (goal) 72' (pen.)	Stadium: Městský stadion Attendance: 14,572; Referee: Ondřej Berka

7 November 2021 14	Sparta Prague	4–2	Teplice	Prague
18:00 CET (UTC+1)	Krejčí II 30'; Hancko 39'; Pulkrab 77', 88'	Report	Succar 40'; Mareš 79' (pen.)	Stadium: Generali Arena; Attendance: 5,617; Referee: Jan Machálek

21 November 2021 15	Slovácko	4–0	Sparta Prague	Uherské Hradiště
15:00 CET (UTC+1)	Kalabiška 16'; Jurečka 43'; Holzer 57'; Cicilia 85'	Report		Stadium: Městský fotbalový stadion Miroslava Valenty; Attendance: 7,701; Referee: Pavel Franěk

28 November 2021 16	Sparta Prague	2–1	Slovan Liberec	Prague
18:00 CEST (UTC+2)	Karabec 5'; Pulkrab 81'	Report	Frýdek 33'	Stadium: Generali Arena; Attendance: 977; Referee: Ondrej Pechanec

4 December 2021 17	Karviná	1–2	Sparta Prague	Karviná
15:00 CET (UTC+1)	Sinyavskiy 78'	Report	Pulkrab 60'; Haraslín 76'	Stadium: Městský stadion Attendance: 1,000; Referee: Ondřej Berka

12 December 2021 18	Sparta Prague	5–1	Bohemians 1905	Prague
18:00 CET (UTC+1)	Pulkrab 15', 40', 42'; Pavelka 44'; Hancko 53'	Report		Stadium: Stadion Letná; Attendance: 1,000; Referee: Pavel Orel

18 December 2021 19	Hradec Králové	0–1	Sparta Prague	Mladá Boleslav (Note: Hradec Králové played their home matches in Mladá Boleslav due to the rebuilding of their own Všesportovní stadion.)
18:00 CET (UTC+1)		Report	Hložek 75'	Stadium: Lokotrans Aréna; Attendance: 1,000; Referee: Petr Hocek

5 February 2022 20	České Budějovice	0–0	Sparta Prague	České Budějovice
18:00 CET (UTC+1)		Report		Stadium: Stadion Střelecký ostrov Attendance: 1,000; Referee: Dalibor Černý

13 February 2022 21	Sparta Prague	2–2	Viktoria Plzeň	Prague
18:00 CET (UTC+1)	Pavelka 71'; Holec (yellow card) 88'; Hložek 90+1'	Report	Chorý 20'; Sýkora (yellow card) 29'; Hejda (yellow card) 51', (goal) 53'; Bílek (not on pitch) (yellow card) 78'	Stadium: Generali Arena; Attendance: 1,000; Referee: Ondřej Berka

13 February 2027 23	Sparta Prague	2–0	Fastav Zlín	Prague
18:00 CET (UTC+1)	Čvančara 47'; Pešek 87'	Report		Stadium: Generali Arena; Attendance: 7,279; Referee: Jan Machálek

6 March 2022 24	Slavia Prague	2–0	Sparta Prague	Prague
18:00 CET (UTC+1)	Lingr 41'; Bah (yellow card) 44'; Traoré (yellow card) 45+2'; D.Jurásek (yellow card) 52'; Holeš (yellow card) 62'; Olayinka (yellow card) 72'; Schranz 90+2'	Report	Krejčí II (yellow card) 14'; Pešek (yellow card) 45+2'; Karabec (yellow card) 62'; Krejčí I (yellow card) 70'	Stadium: Sinobo Stadium; Attendance: 19,370; Referee: Szymon Marciniak

9 March 2022 22	Jablonec	1–1	Sparta Prague	Jablonec nad Nisou
18:30 CET (UTC+1)	Silný 81'	Report	Čvančara 85'	Stadium: Stadion Střelnice; Attendance: 2,416; Referee: Dalibor Černý
Note: The match was originally scheduled for 20 February 2022, but was postponed due to snow.

13 March 2022 25	Sparta Prague	3–1	Pardubice	Prague
18:00 CET (UTC+1)	L. Krejčí II 60'; Minchev 85'; Haraslín 89'	Report	Černý 90+2'	Stadium: Generali Arena; Attendance: 6,132; Referee: Ladislav Szikszay

20 March 2022 26	Mladá Boleslav	0–3	Sparta Prague	Mladá Boleslav
15:00 CET (UTC+1)	Sladký (yellow card) 60'; Horský (yellow card) 65'	Report	Čvančara 15'; Vitík 25'; Krejčí II (yellow card) 75', (goal) 90+3'	Stadium: Lokotrans Aréna; Attendance: 4,715; Referee: Petr Hocek

2 April 2022 27	Sparta Prague	2–1	Baník Ostrava	Prague
19:00 CEST (UTC+2)	Hložek 16'; Wiesner 41'	Report	Svozil 8'	Stadium: Generali Arena; Attendance: 15,205; Referee: Tomáš Klíma

9 April 2022 28	Teplice	0–3	Sparta Prague	Teplice
19:00 CEST (UTC+2)		Report	Čvančara 47', 65'; Vitík 58'	Stadium: Na Stínadlech; Attendance: 10,063; Referee: Jan Machálek

17 April 2022 29	Sparta Prague	3–1	Slovácko	Prague
17:00 CEST (UTC+2)	Hancko 33'; Dočkal 44'; Hložek 73'	Report	Holzer 42'	Stadium: Generali Arena; Attendance: 14,235; Referee: Ladislav Szikszay

20 April 2022 30	Sigma Olomouc	2–0	Sparta Prague	Olomouc
18:00 CEST (UTC+2)	Breite 7'; Beneš 11'	Report	Pešek (yellow card) 68'	Stadium: Andrův stadion Attendance: 9,157; Referee: Tomáš Klíma

==== Championship group ====
Pos	Team	Pld	W	D	L	GF	GA	GD	Pts	Qualification or relegation
1	Viktoria Plzeň (C)	35	26	7	2	63	21	+42	85	Qualification for the Champions League second qualifying round
2	Slavia Prague	35	24	6	5	80	27	+53	78	Qualification for the Europa Conference League second qualifying round
3	Sparta Prague	35	22	7	6	72	40	+32	73	Qualification for the Europa Conference League second qualifying round
4	Slovácko	35	21	5	9	59	38	+21	68	Qualification to Europa League third qualifying round (Note: Slovácko qualified for the Europa League as Czech Cup winners.)
5	Baník Ostrava	35	15	10	10	60	48	+12	55	
6	Hradec Králové	35	10	14	11	44	52	−8	44	

Source: Fortuna Liga
Rules for classification: 1) Total points; 2) Points earned in regular season; 3) Head-to-head points (regular season); 4) Head-to-head goal difference (regular season); 5) Head-to-head goals scored (regular season); 5) Goal difference (all matches); 6) Goals scored (all matches); 7) Fair-play ranking; 8) Draw.
(C) Champions
Notes:

23 April 2022 31	Sparta Prague	3–1	Baník Ostrava	Prague
20:00 CEST (UTC+2)	L. Krejčí II 41'; Čvančara 75'; Haraslín 81'	Report	Almási 90+3'	Stadium: Generali Arena; Attendance: 8,617; Referee: Dalibor Černý

11 May 2022 34	Sparta Prague	1–2	Slovácko	Prague
19:00 CEST (UTC+2)	Hancko 31' (pen.)	Report	Holzer 54'; Havlík 81'	Stadium: Generali Arena; Attendance: 7,093; Referee: Michal Křepský

15 May 2022 35	Slavia Prague	1–2	Sparta Prague	Prague
17:00 CEST (UTC+2)	Traoré (yellow card) 32'; Ševčík 39'; Hovorka (yellow card) 45+1'; Usor (yellow card) 90'; Talovyerov (yellow card) 90+1'; Plavšić (red card) 90+1'	Report	Pešek (yellow card) 13'; Čvančara 20'; Vitík (yellow card) 49'; Wiesner (yellow card) 59' (yellow-red card) 78'; Hložek 83'; Haraslín (yellow card) 90+1'	Stadium: Sinobo Stadium; Attendance: 18,131; Referee: Tomas Klíma

=== Czech Cup ===
22 September 2021 Third round	Líšeň	0–3	Sparta Prague	Brno
16:00 CET	Stáňa (yellow card) 74'	Report	Drchal 14' 38'; Minchev 88'	Stadium: Stadion SK Líšeň; Attendance: 2,070; Referee: Petr Hocek

27 October 2021 Fourth round	Teplice	0–2	Sparta Prague	Teplice
17:00 CET	J. Švanda (red card) 18'	Report	Moberg Karlsson 19' (pen.); Dočkal 39'; Sáček (yellow card) 90'	Stadium: AGC Aréna Na Stínadlech; Attendance: 3,412; Referee: Pavel Franěk

9 February 2022 Quarter-finals	Slavia Prague	0–2	Sparta Prague	Prague
17:00 CET (UTC+1)	Kacharaba (yellow card) 12' (yellow-red card) 86'; Schranz (yellow card) 28'	Report	M.Suchomel (yellow card) 6'; L.Krejčí II 10', (yellow card) 73'; Pešek 26'	Stadium: Sinobo Stadium; Attendance: 1,000; Referee: Pavel Orel

3 March 2022 Semi-finals	Sparta Prague	4–3 (a.e.t.)	Jablonec	Prague
17:00 CET (UTC+1)	Čvančara 45', 90+5', (yellow card) 96'; Wiesner (yellow card) 45+1'; L.Krejčí II 47', (yellow card) 78'; Hložek 92'; Souček (yellow card) 115'; Heča (yellow card) 116'	Report	Malínský 35', (yellow card) 54'; Kratochvíl 50', (yellow card) 90+12'; Štěpánek 57'; Martinec (yellow card) 90+1'; Černák (yellow card) 107'	Stadium: Stadion Letná; Attendance: 4,986; Referee: Tomáš Klíma

18 May 2022 Final	Slovácko	3–1	Sparta Prague	Uherské Hradiště
17:00 CEST (UTC+2)	Jurečka 11' (pen.); Reinberk 33', 43'; Petržela (yellow card) 47'	Report	Suchomel (yellow card) 10'; Hancko 42'; Čvančara (yellow card) 65'; Dočkal (yellow card) 80'	Stadium: Městský fotbalový stadion Miroslava Valenty; Attendance: 7,991; Referee: Ladislav Szikszay

=== UEFA Champions League ===
==== Second qualifying round ====
The draw for the second qualifying round was held on 16 June 2021.

21 July 2021 First leg	Rapid Wien (Austria)	2–1	(Czech Republic) Sparta Prague	Vienna, Austria
20:30 CEST (UTC+2)	Ullmann (yellow card) 23'; Wimmer (yellow card) 33'; Stojković (yellow card) 41'; Knasmüllner 63', 71'; Grahovac (yellow card) 86'	Report	Krejčí II 3'; Štetina (yellow card) 17'; Hancko (yellow card) 60'	Stadium: Allianz Stadion; Attendance: 19,500; Referee: Serdar Gözübüyük (Netherlands)

28 July 2021 Second leg	Sparta Prague (Czech Republic)	2–0 (3–2 agg.)	(Austria) Rapid Wien	Prague, Czech Republic
20:30 CEST (UTC+2)	Karlsson 16' (pen.); Pešek 81'; Dočkal (yellow card) 89'; Wiesner (yellow card) 90+6'	Report	Strebinger (yellow card) 15'; Wimmer (yellow card) 89'	Stadium: Stadion Letná; Attendance: 9,105; Referee: Bobby Madden (Scotland)

==== Third qualifying round ====
The draw for the third qualifying round was held on 19 July 2021.

3 August 2021 First leg	Sparta Prague (Czech Republic)	0–2	(France) Monaco	Prague, Czech Republic
20:00 CEST (UTC+2)	Polidar (yellow card) 17'; Pavelka (yellow card) 34'	Report	Fofana (yellow card) 5'; Badiashile (yellow card) 22'; Tchouaméni 37', (yellow card) 83'; Volland 59'	Stadium: Stadion Letná; Attendance: 10,533; Referee: Michael Oliver (England)

10 August 2021 Second leg	Monaco (France)	3–1 (5–1 agg.)	(Czech Republic) Sparta Prague	Monaco, France
20:00 CEST (UTC+2)	Tchouaméni (yellow card) 49'; Martins 50'; Golovin 56'; Diop 81'	Report	Wiesner (yellow card) 5'; Moberg Karlsson 78'; Pulkrab (yellow card) 88'	Stadium: Stade Louis II; Attendance: 5,476; Referee: Daniele Orsato (Italy)

=== Group A ===
Pos	Team	Pld	W	D	L	GF	GA	GD	Pts	Qualification	LYO	RAN	SPP	BRO
1	(France) Lyon	6	5	1	0	16	5	+11	16	Advance to round of 16	—	1–1	3–0	3–0
2	(Scotland) Rangers	6	2	2	2	6	5	+1	8	Advance to knockout round play-offs	0–2	—	2–0	2–0
3	(Czech Republic) Sparta Prague	6	2	1	3	6	9	−3	7	Transfer to Europa Conference League	3–4	1–0	—	2–0
4	(Denmark) Brøndby	6	0	2	4	2	11	−9	2		1–3	1–1	0–0	—

Source: UEFA
Rules for classification: Group stage tiebreakers

=== Matches ===
16 September 2021 1	(Denmark) Brøndby	0 – 0	(Czech Republic) Sparta Prague	Brøndbyvester, Denmark
21:00 CET	Rosted (yellow card) 45+2'; Pavlović (yellow card) 85'	Report	Souček (yellow card) 45+2'; Čelůstka (yellow card) 60'	Stadium: Brøndby Stadium; Attendance: 18,867; Referee: (North Macedonia) Aleksandar Stavrev

30 September 2021 2	(Czech Republic) Sparta Prague	1 – 0	(Scotland) Rangers	Prague
18:45 CET	Hancko 29'; Wiesner (yellow card) 43'; Haraslín (yellow card) 70'	Report	Kamara (yellow card) 42' (yellow-red card) 74'; Sakala (yellow card) 67'	Stadium: Generali Česká pojišťovna Arena; Attendance: 10,879; Referee: (Turkey) Ali Palabıyık

21 October 2021 3	(Czech Republic) Sparta Prague	3 – 4	(France) Lyon	Prague
21:00 CET	Haraslín 4' 19' (yellow card) 59'; Pavelka (yellow card) 80'; Krejčí 90+6'	Report	Henrique (yellow card) 24'; Toko Ekambi 42' (yellow card) 62' (goal) 88'; Gusto (yellow card) 52' (yellow-red card) 74'; Aouar 53'; Boateng (yellow card) 59'; Lucas Paquetá 67' (yellow card) 68'; Thiago Mendes (yellow card) 85'	Stadium: Generali Česká pojišťovna Arena; Attendance: 12,427; Referee: (Slovenia) Matej Jug

4 November 2021 4	(France) Lyon	3 – 0	(Czech Republic) Sparta Prague	Décines-Charpieu, France
18:45 CET	Slimani 61', 64'; Toko Ekambi 90+2'	Report	Vindheim (yellow card) 40'; Krejčí II (yellow card) 63'	Stadium: Groupama Stadium; Attendance: 33,934; Referee: (Italy) Maurizio Mariani

25 November 2021 5	(Scotland) Rangers	2 – 0	(Czech Republic) Sparta Prague	Glasgow, Scotland
21:00 CET	Morelos 15', 48'; Hagi (yellow card) 45'; Barišić (yellow card) 57'	Report	Krejčí (yellow card) 45+1'	Stadium: Ibrox Stadium; Attendance: 48,370; Referee: (Netherlands) Danny Makkelie

9 December 2021 6	(Czech Republic) Sparta Prague	2 – 0	(Denmark) Brøndby	Stadion Letná, Prague
18:45 CET	Hancko 43'; Wiesner (yellow card) 47' (yellow-red card) 57'; Pulkrab (yellow card) 48'; Hložek 49'; Souček (yellow card) 51'	Report	Slimane (yellow card) 7' (yellow-red card) 75'; Riveros (yellow card) 47'; Maxso (yellow card) 48'; Singh (yellow card) 88'	Attendance: 976; Referee: (England) Craig Pawson

=== UEFA Conference League ===
==== Knockout round play-offs ====
17 February 2022 First leg	(Czech Republic) Sparta Prague	0–1	(Serbia) Partizan Belgrade	Prague
21:00 CET	Hložek (yellow card) 67'; Krejčí (yellow card) 90'	Report	Marković (yellow card) 32'; Menig 78'; Terzić (yellow card) 90'; Vujačić (yellow card) 90'	Stadium: Stadion Letná; Attendance: 1,000; Referee: (Sweden) Andreas Ekberg

24 February 2022 Second leg	(Serbia) Partizan Belgrade	2–1 (3–1 agg.)	(Czech Republic) Sparta Prague	Belgrade, Serbia
18:45 CET	Gomes 7', 24' (yellow card) 6' (yellow-red card) 66'; Miletić (yellow card) 46'; Urošević (yellow card) 85'; Popović (yellow card) 90+1'; Holender (yellow card) 90+3'; Jevtović (yellow card) 90+4'	Report	Krejčí (yellow card) 35'; Čvančara (yellow card) 48'; Hložek 85'; Wiesner (yellow card) 90+4'	Stadium: Partizan Stadium; Attendance: 15,864; Referee: (Bulgaria) Georgi Kabakov
