= Michal Sáček =

Czech footballer

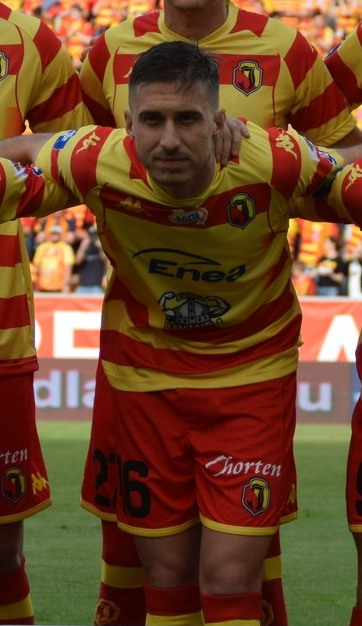
- Sáček with Jagiellonia Białystok in 2024

Personal information
- Date of birth: 19 September 1996 (age 30)
- Place of birth: Hustopeče, Czech Republic
- Height: 1.80 m (5 ft 11 in)
- Positions: Right-back; central midfielder

Team information
- Current team: Górnik Zabrze
- Number: 61

Youth career
- Hustopeče
- 2007: Břeclav
- 2008–2011: Tatran Bohunice
- 2011–2013: Hodonín
- 2013–2016: Sparta Prague

Senior career*
Years	Team	Apps	(Gls)
2016–2023	Sparta Prague	157	(3)
2022	Sparta Prague B	4	(0)
2023–2025	Jagiellonia Białystok	66	(1)
2023	Jagiellonia Białystok II	1	(0)
2025–	Górnik Zabrze	20	(0)

International career^{‡}
2016	Czech Republic U20	2	(1)
2017–2018	Czech Republic U21	15	(1)
2021–	Czech Republic	2	(0)
- * Club domestic league appearances and goals as of 22:58, 26 September 2026 (UTC) ‡ National team caps and goals as of 21:20, 3 October 2026 (UTC)

Michal Sáček (born 19 September 1996) is a Czech professional footballer who plays for Ekstraklasa club Górnik Zabrze and the Czech Republic national team. A central midfielder throughout most of his career, he can also be deployed as a right-back.

== Club career ==
=== Sparta Prague ===
He made his career league debut for Sparta Prague on 14 May 2016 in a Czech First League 5–0 home win against Vysočina Jihlava. While at Sparta Prague, he won the Revelation of the Year award for the 2016–17 Czech First League season.

=== Jagiellonia Białystok ===
On 2 February 2023, Polish club Jagiellonia Białystok announced the signing of Sáček on a two-and-a-half-year contract.

=== Górnik Zabrze ===
On 9 June 2025, Sáček signed a contract with Polish club Górnik Zabrze until June 2028.

== International career ==
He was called up to the Czech national team on 2 June 2017 to face Belgium and Norway as a replacement for the injured Antonín Barák, but failed to make an appearance. He represented his country on the 2017 European Under-21 Championship. In the first match, a 0–2 loss to Germany, his defensive error led to a goal by Serge Gnabry.

He made his senior debut on 8 September 2021 in a friendly against Ukraine, a 1–1 home draw.

== Career statistics ==
=== Club ===
As of match played 19 September 2026

Appearances and goals by club, season and competition
Club	Season	League			National cup (Note: Includes Czech Cup, Polish Cup)		Continental		Other		Total	
Club	Season	Division	Apps	Goals	Apps	Goals	Apps	Goals	Apps	Goals	Apps	Goals
Sparta Prague	2015–16	Czech First League	1	0	3	0	0	0	—		4	0
Sparta Prague	2016–17	Czech First League	15	0	0	0	5 (Note: Appearance(s) in UEFA Europa League)	0	—		20	0
Sparta Prague	2017–18	Czech First League	19	0	2	0	0	0	—		21	0
Sparta Prague	2018–19	Czech First League	25	1	3	0	0	0	—		28	1
Sparta Prague	2019–20	Czech First League	35	2	4	0	2	0	—		41	2
Sparta Prague	2020–21	Czech First League	27	0	4	0	4	0	—		35	0
Sparta Prague	2021–22	Czech First League	30	0	5	0	10 (Note: Three appearances in UEFA Champions League, five appearances in UEFA Europa League, two appearances in UEFA Europa Conference League)	0	—		45	0
Sparta Prague	2022–23	Czech First League	5	0	1	0	1 (Note: Appearance(s) in UEFA Europa Conference League)	0	—		7	0
Sparta Prague	Total		157	3	22	0	22	0	0	0	201	3
Sparta Prague B	2022–23	CNFL	4	0	—		—		—		4	0
Jagiellonia Białystok	2022–23	Ekstraklasa	14	0	—		—		—		14	0
Jagiellonia Białystok	2023–24	Ekstraklasa	33	1	5	0	—		—		38	1
Jagiellonia Białystok	2024–25	Ekstraklasa	19	0	2	0	13 (Note: Four appearances in UEFA Champions League, two appearances in UEFA Europa League, seven appearances in UEFA Conference League)	0	0	0	34	0
Jagiellonia Białystok	Total		66	1	7	0	13	0	—		86	1
Jagiellonia Białystok II	2023–24	III liga, group I	1	0	—		—		—		1	0
Górnik Zabrze	2025–26	Ekstraklasa	12	0	2	0	—		—		14	0
Górnik Zabrze	2026–27	Ekstraklasa	8	0	0	0	6 (Note: Two appearances and one goal in UEFA Champions League, two appearances in UEFA Europa League, two appearances in UEFA Conference League)	1	1 (Note: Appearance in Polish Super Cup)	0	15	1
Górnik Zabrze	Total		20	0	2	0	6	1	1	0	29	1
Career total			248	4	31	0	41	1	1	0	321	5

=== International ===
As of match played 3 October 2026

Appearances and goals by national team and year
National team	Year	Apps	Goals
Czech Republic
Czech Republic	2021	1	0
Czech Republic	2026	1	0
Total		2	0

== Honours ==
Sparta Prague

- Czech Cup: 2019–20

Jagiellonia Białystok

- Ekstraklasa: 2023–24

Górnik Zabrze

- Polish Cup: 2025–26
