= Eldar Ćivić =

Bosnian footballer (born 1996)

Personal information
- Date of birth: 28 May 1996 (age 30)
- Place of birth: Tuzla, Bosnia and Herzegovina
- Height: 1.82 m (6 ft 0 in)
- Position: Left-back

Team information
- Current team: Baltika
- Number: 77

Youth career
- Sloboda Tuzla
- 2012–2015: Slovácko

Senior career*
Years	Team	Apps	(Gls)
2015–2017	Slovácko	48	(2)
2017–2019	Sparta Prague	24	(0)
2018	→ Spartak Trnava (loan)	8	(0)
2019–2025	Ferencváros	123	(2)
2025–	Baltika	27	(2)

International career
2012	Bosnia and Herzegovina U17	3	(0)
2014–2015	Bosnia and Herzegovina U19	15	(0)
2015–2018	Bosnia and Herzegovina U21	13	(1)
2018–2024	Bosnia and Herzegovina	28	(1)
- * Club domestic league appearances and goals as of 8 November 2026

Eldar Ćivić (pronounced [ěldar tɕîːʋitɕ]; born 28 May 1996) is a Bosnian professional footballer who plays as a left-back for Russian Premier League club Baltika.

Ćivić started his professional career at Slovácko, before joining Sparta Prague in 2017, who loaned him to Spartak Trnava a year later. The following year, he signed with Ferencváros. Six years later, he switched to Baltika.

A former youth international for Bosnia and Herzegovina, Ćivić made his senior international debut in 2018, earning over 20 caps until 2024.

== Club career ==
=== Early career ===
Ćivić started playing football at his hometown club Sloboda Tuzla, before joining the youth setup of Czech team Slovácko in 2012. He made his professional debut against Příbram on 14 March 2015 at the age of 18. On 2 April 2016, he scored his first professional goal in a triumph over Sparta Prague.

=== Sparta Prague ===
In May 2017, Ćivić signed a four-year deal with Sparta Prague. He made his official debut for the squad in a UEFA Europa League qualifier against Red Star Belgrade on 27 July. A week later, he made his league debut against Mladá Boleslav.

In February 2018, he was loaned to Slovak side Spartak Trnava until the end of season.

=== Ferencváros ===
In June 2019, Ćivić was transferred to Hungarian outfit Ferencváros for an undisclosed fee. He made his competitive debut for the team in a UEFA Champions League qualifier against Valletta on 24 July. A month later, he made his league debut against Puskás Akadémia. He won his first trophy with the club on 16 June 2020, when they were crowned league champions. On 30 August, he scored his first goal for Ferencváros in a defeat of Zalaegerszeg.

Ćivić debuted in the UEFA Champions League away at Barcelona on 20 October.

In March 2022, he extended his contract with the squad until June 2025.

He played his 100th game for Ferencváros against Qarabağ on 3 August.

=== Later stage of career ===
In June 2025, Ćivić moved to Russian team Baltika.

== International career ==
Ćivić represented Bosnia and Herzegovina at all youth levels. He also served as a captain of the under-21 team under coach Vinko Marinović.

In May 2018, he received his first senior call up, for friendly games against Montenegro and South Korea. He debuted against the latter on 1 June.

On 18 November 2019, in a UEFA Euro 2020 qualifier against Liechtenstein, Ćivić scored his first senior international goal.

== Personal life ==
Ćivić's older brother Muharem is also a professional footballer.

== Career statistics ==
=== Club ===
As of match played 8 November 2026

Appearances and goals by club, season and competition
Club	Season	League			National cup (Note: Includes Czech Cup, Slovak Cup, Magyar Kupa, Russian Cup)		Continental		Total	
Club	Season	Division	Apps	Goals	Apps	Goals	Apps	Goals	Apps	Goals
Slovácko	2014–15	Czech First League	3	0	1	0	–		4	0
Slovácko	2015–16	Czech First League	24	1	0	0	–		24	1
Slovácko	2016–17	Czech First League	21	1	1	1	–		22	2
Slovácko	Total		48	2	2	1	–		50	3
Sparta Prague	2017–18	Czech First League	4	0	1	0	1 (Note: Appearance in UEFA Europa League)	0	6	0
Sparta Prague	2018–19	Czech First League	20	0	2	0	0	0	22	0
Sparta Prague	Total		24	0	3	0	1	0	28	0
Spartak Trnava (loan)	2017–18	Slovak First League	8	0	3	0	–		11	0
Ferencváros	2019–20	Nemzeti Bajnokság I	25	0	1	0	7 (Note: Four appearances in UEFA Champions League; three appearances in UEFA Europa League)	0	33	0
Ferencváros	2020–21	Nemzeti Bajnokság I	18	1	2	0	5 (Note: Appearances in UEFA Champions League)	0	25	1
Ferencváros	2021–22	Nemzeti Bajnokság I	25	1	2	0	10 (Note: Six appearances in UEFA Champions League; four appearances in UEFA Europa League)	0	37	1
Ferencváros	2022–23	Nemzeti Bajnokság I	17	0	0	0	11 (Note: Six appearances in UEFA Champions League; five appearances, one goal in UEFA Europa League)	1	28	1
Ferencváros	2023–24	Nemzeti Bajnokság I	18	0	4	1	10 (Note: Two appearances in UEFA Champions League; eight appearances in UEFA Conference League)	0	32	1
Ferencváros	2024–25	Nemzeti Bajnokság I	20	0	6	0	10 (Note: One appearance in UEFA Champions League; nine appearances in UEFA Europa League)	0	36	0
Ferencváros	Total		123	2	15	1	53	1	191	4
Baltika	2025–26	Russian Premier League	18	1	5	0	–		23	1
Baltika	2026–27	Russian Premier League	9	1	4	0	–		13	1
Baltika	Total		27	2	9	0	–		36	2
Career total			230	6	32	2	54	1	316	9

=== International ===
Appearances and goals by national team and year
National team	Year	Apps	Goals
Bosnia and Herzegovina
Bosnia and Herzegovina	2018	5	0
Bosnia and Herzegovina	2019	4	1
Bosnia and Herzegovina	2020	2	0
Bosnia and Herzegovina	2021	9	0
Bosnia and Herzegovina	2022	5	0
Bosnia and Herzegovina	2023	2	0
Bosnia and Herzegovina	2024	1	0
Total		28	1

Scores and results list Bosnia and Herzegovina's goal tally first, score column indicates score after each Ćivić goal.

List of international goals scored by Eldar Ćivić
No.	Date	Venue	Cap	Opponent	Score	Result	Competition
1	18 November 2019	Rheinpark Stadion, Vaduz, Liechtenstein	9	Liechtenstein	1–0	3–0	UEFA Euro 2020 qualifying

== Honours ==
Spartak Trnava

- Slovak Super Liga: 2017–18

Ferencváros

- Nemzeti Bajnokság I: 2019–20, 2020–21, 2021–22, 2022–23, 2023–24, 2024–25
- Magyar Kupa: 2021–22
