= Václav Drchal =

Czech footballer

Personal information
- Date of birth: 25 July 1999 (age 27)
- Place of birth: České Budějovice, Czech Republic
- Height: 1.87 m (6 ft 2 in)
- Position: Forward

Team information
- Current team: Pardubice

Youth career
- 2008–2016: České Budějovice
- 2016–2018: Sparta Prague

Senior career*
Years	Team	Apps	(Gls)
2018–2023	Sparta Prague	20	(6)
2020–2021	→ Mladá Boleslav (loan)	25	(6)
2022	→ Dynamo Dresden (loan)	3	(0)
2022–2023	→ Bohemians 1905 (loan)	26	(6)
2023–2024	Jablonec	22	(2)
2024–2026	Bohemians 1905	63	(6)
2026–	Pardubice	0	(0)

International career^{‡}
2016–2017	Czech Republic U17	9	(3)
2017	Czech Republic U18	1	(0)
2017–2018	Czech Republic U19	7	(1)
2019–2021	Czech Republic U21	9	(3)
- * Club domestic league appearances and goals as of 27 May 2026 ‡ National team caps and goals as of 27 March 2021

Václav Drchal (born 25 July 1999) is a Czech professional footballer who plays as a forward for Czech First League club Pardubice as a striker.

A product of the České Budějovice youth set-up, Drchal joined Sparta Prague in 2016. After impressing in the Under-19s, he scored on his professional debut in February 2018.

== Club career ==
=== Dynamo České Budějovice ===
Drchal began his career at hometown club Dynamo České Budějovice before joining the Sparta Prague youth set-up in 2016.

=== Sparta Prague ===
Having scored 22 goals in 15 games for the Under-19s in the 1. Dorostinecká Liga, as well as two goals in both the Premier League International Cup and UEFA Youth League, Drchal was rewarded with a chance to join the first team.

In January 2018, he signed a contract extension securing his future at the club until 2020. The same month he scored a hat-trick within fifteen minutes after making a substitute appearance in a 7–2 win against FC MAS Táborsko, his first match for Sparta's A-team.

On 25 February, he made his competitive debut in a 1–1 draw with 1. FC Slovácko. Drchal scored his first goal for the club in the 53rd minute to give his side the lead. In doing so, he became the third youngest player to score on their debut in the Czech top flight – only Petr Ruman and Vladimir Stork were younger when they scored in debuts in the 1993–94 and 1994–95 seasons.

=== Jablonec ===
On 21 July 2023, Drchal signed a contract with Jablonec.

=== Bohemians ===
On 7 June 2024, Drchal signed a multi-year contract with Bohemians 1905.

=== Pardubice ===
On 23 June 2026, Drchal signed a multi-year contract with Pardubice.

== International career ==
On 2 September 2017, Drchal made his youth international debut in a 2–1 defeat to Republic of Ireland Under-19s. Two days later, he made a second appearance – once again against the Republic of Ireland – and scored in another 2–1 friendly defeat.

After being named as an unused substitute in a 5–0 win against Armenia in 2018 UEFA European Under-19 Championship qualification, he made appearances off the bench in victories against Luxembourg and Scotland as Czech Republic topped their group with maximum points.

== Career statistics ==
As of 8 July 2022

Club	Season	League			Cup		Continental		Other		Total	
Club	Season	Division	Apps	Goals	Apps	Goals	Apps	Goals	Apps	Goals	Apps	Goals
Sparta Prague	2017–18	Czech First League	3	1	—		—		—		3	1
Sparta Prague	2018–19	Czech First League	10	3	2	1	—		—		12	4
Sparta Prague	2019–20	Czech First League	3	0	—		—		—		3	0
Sparta Prague	2021–22	Czech First League	4	2	2	2	2	0	—		8	4
Sparta Prague	Total		20	6	4	3	2	0	0	0	26	9
Mladá Boleslav (loan)	2020–21	Czech First League	25	6	2	1	—		—		27	7
Dynamo Dresden (loan)	2021–22	2. Bundesliga	14	0	—		—		—		14	0
Career total			59	12	6	4	2	0	0	0	67	16
