= Srđan Plavšić =

Serbian footballer (born 1995)

Personal information
- Full name: Srđan Plavšić
- Date of birth: 3 December 1995 (age 30)
- Place of birth: Novi Sad, FR Yugoslavia
- Height: 1.66 m (5 ft 5 in)
- Positions: Attacking midfielder; wing-back

Team information
- Current team: Železničar Pančevo

Youth career
- Vojvodina

Senior career*
Years	Team	Apps	(Gls)
2012–2014	ČSK Čelarevo	31	(7)
2014–2015	Spartak Subotica	25	(1)
2015–2017	Red Star Belgrade	64	(10)
2017–2021	Sparta Prague	80	(7)
2020	→ Sparta Prague B	4	(2)
2021–2023	Slavia Prague	24	(1)
2022	→ Slavia Prague B	1	(0)
2022–2023	→ Baník Ostrava (loan)	24	(5)
2023–2026	Raków Częstochowa	26	(1)
2025–2026	→ Baník Ostrava (loan)	15	(0)
2026–	Železničar Pančevo	1	(0)

International career
2015	Serbia U20	4	(0)
2015–2017	Serbia U21	8	(0)
2016–2017	Serbia	2	(0)
- * Club domestic league appearances and goals as of 30 August 2026

Srđan Plavšić (Serbian Cyrillic: Срђан Плавшић; born 3 December 1995) is a Serbian professional footballer. He can operate as an attacking midfielder, side midfielder or wing-back.

== Club career ==
=== Early years ===
"I watched the little one when he was on loan in ČSK Čelarevo. It's unbelievable how he pushes the ball, like Iniesta. I thought he wouldn't be able to repeat that in the top tier, but he dominated here too. He's a scary player."

— Zvezdan Terzić speaking about Plavšić, June 2015

Plavšić played in FK Vojvodina's youth system, but was told that he was too small to make it for Vojvodina's first team. He began playing football on a senior level with ČSK Čelarevo in the lower tiers of the Serbian football pyramid. He played in Čelarevo for two seasons before moving to Spartak Subotica. It was in Spartak where Plavšić made his debut in the Serbian top flight for the 2014–15 season, and he played impressively particularly in a match against Red Star Belgrade.

=== Red Star Belgrade ===
On 10 August 2015 Plavšić signed a three-year contract with Red Star Belgrade. In his promotion the following day, he chose the number 17 for his jersey. At Red Star, he got the nickname "Atomic Ant", due to his height of 166 centimeters, which at the time was the shortest among all of Red Star's players. In the first half of the 2015–16 season, Plavšić was statistically Red Star's most fouled player, as other teams' players would routinely accumulate yellow cards from tackling him.

=== Sparta Prague ===
Plavšić signed with Czech side Sparta Prague on 27 June 2017. The reported fee is believed to be around €1.3 million. He made his debut for Sparta in 2–0 defeat against his former club Red Star Belgrade on 27 July 2017.

=== Slavia Prague ===
Plavšić signed a three-year contract with city rivals Slavia Prague on 10 June 2021.

==== Loan to Baník Ostrava ====
On 8 September 2022, he was loaned to Baník Ostrava in Czech First League.

=== Raków Częstochowa ===
On 25 July 2023, Plavšić was transferred to defending Ekstraklasa champions Raków Częstochowa, with whom he signed a three-year deal, with an option for another year. He established himself as the first-choice left wing-back in the first half of the 2023–24 season before losing his spot to a winter arrival Erick Otieno. On 20 February 2024, Raków announced Plavšić had suffered a MCL tear during a training session two days prior. Shortly after resuming training in early May, he ruptured his Achilles tendon, causing him to be sidelined for the rest of the year. On 11 February 2026, Raków announced that Plavšić's contract, due to expire in June 2026, would not be extended.

==== Second loan to Baník Ostrava ====
On 20 August 2025, Plavšić joined Baník Ostrava on a one-year loan deal.

== International career ==
Plavšić made his international debut for the Serbia national football team in a 3–0 friendly loss to Qatar. He also received a call for a friendly match against United States, on 29 January 2017.

== Personal life ==
Plavšić's father Petar, also born in Novi Sad, was a professional futsal player during his youth. Srđan has credited his father for teaching him many of the tricks he uses in matches. Srđan's paternal grandfather is from Šipovo.

== Career statistics ==
=== Club ===
As of match played 30 May 2026

Appearances and goals by club, season and competition
Club	Season	League			National cup (Note: Includes Serbian Cup, Czech Cup, Polish Cup)		Continental		Other		Total	
Club	Season	Division	Apps	Goals	Apps	Goals	Apps	Goals	Apps	Goals	Apps	Goals
ČSK Čelarevo	2012–13	Serbian League Vojvodina	8	2	—		—		—		8	2
ČSK Čelarevo	2013–14	Serbian League Vojvodina	23	5	—		—		—		23	5
ČSK Čelarevo	Total		31	7	—		—		—		31	7
Spartak Subotica	2014–15	Serbian SuperLiga	21	1	3	1	—		—		24	2
Spartak Subotica	2015–16	Serbian SuperLiga	4	0	—		—		—		4	0
Spartak Subotica	Total		25	1	3	1	—		—		28	2
Red Star Belgrade	2015–16	Serbian SuperLiga	31	2	2	0	—		—		33	2
Red Star Belgrade	2016–17	Serbian SuperLiga	33	8	6	0	1 (Note: Appearance(s) in UEFA Europa League)	0	—		40	8
Red Star Belgrade	Total		64	10	8	0	1	0	—		73	10
Sparta Prague	2017–18	Czech First League	18	2	1	0	2	0	—		21	2
Sparta Prague	2018–19	Czech First League	19	2	4	1	2	1	—		25	4
Sparta Prague	2019–20	Czech First League	20	1	2	0	2	0	—		24	1
Sparta Prague	2020–21	Czech First League	23	2	4	0	4	1	—		31	3
Sparta Prague	Total		80	7	11	1	10	2	0	0	101	10
Slavia Prague	2021–22	Czech First League	24	1	3	0	11 (Note: Two appearances in UEFA Champions League, nine appearances in UEFA Europa Conference League)	0	—		38	1
Slavia Prague	2022–23	Czech First League	0	0	0	0	1 (Note: Appearance(s) in UEFA Conference League)	0	0	0	1	0
Slavia Prague	Total		24	1	3	0	12	0	0	0	39	1
Baník Ostrava (loan)	2022–23	Czech First League	24	5	3	0	—		—		27	5
Raków Częstochowa	2023–24	Ekstraklasa	17	1	2	0	7 (Note: One appearance in UEFA Champions League, six appearances in UEFA Europa Conference League)	0	0	0	26	1
Raków Częstochowa	2024–25	Ekstraklasa	7	0	0	0	—		—		7	0
Raków Częstochowa	2025–26	Ekstraklasa	2	0	—		0	0	—		2	0
Raków Częstochowa	Total		26	1	2	0	7	0	0	0	35	1
Baník Ostrava (loan)	2025–26	Czech First League	15	0	2	0	2	0	2 (Note: Appearances in Czech First League relegation play-offs)	0	21	0
Career total			289	32	32	2	32	2	2	0	355	36

=== International ===
As of 30 January 2017

Appearances and goals by national team and year
National team	Year	Apps	Goals
Serbia	2016	1	0
Serbia	2017	1	0
Total		2	0

== Honours ==
Red Star Belgrade

- Serbian SuperLiga: 2015–16

Sparta Prague

- Czech Cup: 2019–20
