= Matěj Pulkrab =

Czech footballer

Personal information
- Date of birth: 23 May 1997 (age 29)
- Place of birth: Prague, Czech Republic
- Height: 1.85 m (6 ft 1 in)
- Position: Forward

Team information
- Current team: Teplice
- Number: 10

Youth career
- Sparta Prague

Senior career*
Years	Team	Apps	(Gls)
2015–2022	Sparta Prague	49	(18)
2016	→ Slovan Liberec (loan)	7	(4)
2017–2018	→ Slovan Liberec (loan)	26	(10)
2020	→ Bohemians 1905 (loan)	8	(5)
2020–2021	→ Bohemians 1905 (loan)	20	(5)
2022–2023	SV Sandhausen	16	(0)
2023–2025	Mladá Boleslav	52	(5)
2025–	Teplice	26	(5)

International career
2013	Czech Republic U16	4	(1)
2013–2014	Czech Republic U17	8	(3)
2014	Czech Republic U18	7	(1)
2015–2016	Czech Republic U19	12	(4)
2017–2018	Czech Republic U20	8	(2)
2016–2018	Czech Republic U21	12	(1)
- * Club domestic league appearances and goals as of 27 May 2026

Matěj Pulkrab (born 23 May 1997) is a Czech professional footballer who plays as a forward for Teplice.

== Club career ==
=== Sparta Prague ===
Pulkrab is an academy graduate of Sparta Prague and captained the club at U-19 level. In 2015, he was named "Player of the Tournament" in the CEE Cup.

==== Loan to Slovan Liberec ====
On 13 January 2016, Pulkrab completed a loan move to Slovan Liberec from parent club Sparta Prague in a deal that saw Josef Šural complete a permanent move in the opposite direction. He made his debut for the club on 12 March, coming on as a 92nd-minute substitute for Marek Bakoš in a 1–0 win over Příbram. Pulkrab scored four goals in the final three games of the season, including one on the final day which earned Liberec a third-place finish in the Czech First League.

==== Return to Sparta Prague ====
Pulkrab returned to Sparta Prague for the 2016–17 season and made his debut on 18 August, coming off the bench in a 0–0 Europa League draw with SønderjyskE. He scored his first goal for the club three days later, netting his team's second in a 3–0 Czech Liga win over Jablonec. He made his Cup debut on 12 October and scored in a 2–1 win over České Budějovice. On 20 October, Pulkrab scored his first ever European goal, scoring the only goal of the match in a 1–0 Europa League win over Hapoel Be'er Sheva. He ultimately made 24 appearances for the season, and scored seven goals across all competitions.

==== Second loan to Slovan Liberec ====
On 3 July 2017, Pulkrab returned to Slovan Liberec on a season-long loan. He made his second debut for the club on 30 July and marked the occasion by scoring the only goal in a 1–0 win over Zlín. Having not scored again since his opening goal, Pulkrab scored seven goals in five matches across February and March 2018. Included in the run was his fifteenth career goal in the Czech First League; a milestone he reached faster than any other player in the competition, including international counterparts, Milan Baroš and Václav Kadlec. He ultimately scored 10 goals for the season before returning to Sparta Prague upon the expiration of his loan.

==== Second return to Sparta Prague ====
Following his loan spell, Pulkrab once again returned to Sparta and played a prominent role during the 2018–19 campaign, where he scored four goals in 18 appearances before being sidelined by an Achilles tendon injury in March 2019.

=== Mladá Boleslav ===
On 30 June 2023, Pulkrab signed with Mladá Boleslav a two-year contract.

=== Teplice ===
On 9 June 2025, Pulkrab signed a contract with Teplice as a free agent.

== Personal life ==
Outside of football, Pulkrab is an avid guitar player and admitted to being self-taught. During his time with Slovan Liberec, he would often play the instrument with teammate Zdeněk Folprecht.

== Career statistics ==
=== Club ===
As of 11 June 2022

Appearances and goals by club, season and competition
Club	Season	League			Cup		Continental		Other		Total	
Club	Season	Division	Apps	Goals	Apps	Goals	Apps	Goals	Apps	Goals	Apps	Goals
Slovan Liberec (loan)	2015–16	Czech First League	7	4	—		—		—		7	4
Sparta Prague	2016–17	Czech First League	14	4	2	2	8	1	—		24	7
Sparta Prague	2018–19	Czech First League	16	3	2	1	—		—		18	4
Sparta Prague	2021–22	Czech First League	19	7	2	0	4	0	—		25	7
Sparta Prague	Total		49	18	6	3	12	1	0	0	67	18
Slovan Liberec (loan)	2017–18	Czech First League	26	10	4	5	—		—		30	15
Bohemians 1905 (loan)	2019–20	Czech First League	8	5	—		—		—		8	5
Bohemians 1905 (loan)	2020–21	Czech First League	20	5	1	0	—		—		21	5
Career total			110	38	11	8	12	1	0	0	133	47
