= Vukadin Vukadinović =

Serbian footballer

Personal information
- Date of birth: 14 December 1990 (age 35)
- Place of birth: Belgrade, Yugoslavia
- Height: 1.91 m (6 ft 3 in)
- Position: Right winger

Team information
- Current team: Artis Brno
- Number: 77

Youth career
- Hajduk Beograd

Senior career*
Years	Team	Apps	(Gls)
2008–2009	Hajduk Beograd	5	(0)
2009–2012	MAS Táborsko	32	(5)
2012–2015	Jablonec	10	(1)
2014	→ Viktoria Žižkov (loan)	13	(3)
2014–2015	→ Slavia Prague (loan)	22	(1)
2015	→ Zlín (loan)	10	(1)
2016–2017	Zlín	35	(4)
2017–2019	Sparta Prague	10	(1)
2017–2018	→ Zlín (loan)	21	(2)
2019	→ Boluspor (loan)	5	(0)
2019–2020	Karviná	22	(0)
2020–2021	Teplice	23	(1)
2021–2022	Radnički Niš	9	(0)
2022–2025	Zlín	108	(20)
2025–	Artis Brno	30	(4)
- * Club domestic league appearances and goals as of 24 May 2026

Vukadin Vukadinović (born 14 December 1990) is a Serbian professional footballer who plays as a right winger for Artis Brno.

== International career ==
On 15 October 2016, he declared he had applied for Czech citizenship and was interested in representing the Czech Republic in international football. He confirmed his intention to join the Czech national team on 23 November, after encouragement from the national team coach Karel Jarolím and fulfillment of all legal requirements for receiving Czech citizenship. As of February 2018, he still has not received the citizenship, but reaffirmed his willingness to join the Czech national team once he has received it.

On 18 June 2021, he signed with Radnički Niš.

On 16 June 2025, Vukadinović signed a two-year contract with Artis Brno.

== Personal life ==
Vukadinović is the older brother of fellow footballer Miljan Vukadinović.
