= Ondřej Zahustel =

Czech footballer

Personal information
- Date of birth: 18 June 1991 (age 35)
- Place of birth: Mladá Boleslav, Czechoslovakia
- Height: 1.86 m (6 ft 1 in)
- Position: Right-back

Team information
- Current team: Mladá Boleslav (youth)

Youth career
- 2008–2009: Mladá Boleslav

Senior career*
| Years | Team | Apps | (Gls) |
| 2009–2015 | Mladá Boleslav | 91 | (19) |
| 2016–2021 | Sparta Prague | 67 | (6) |
| 2020 | → Slovácko (loan) | 6 | (1) |
| 2020 | → Mladá Boleslav (loan) | 13 | (2) |
| 2021–2022 | Mladá Boleslav B | 19 | (7) |

International career
| 2010 | Czech Republic U19 | 1 | (0) |
| 2012 | Czech Republic U21 | 1 | (2) |
| 2015–2016 | Czech Republic | 3 | (1) |

Managerial career
- 2022–2023: Mladá Boleslav B (assistant)
- 2023–: Mladá Boleslav (youth)
- * Club domestic league appearances and goals as of 20:41, 25 January 2023 (UTC)

Ondřej Zahustel (born 18 June 1991) is a former professional Czech football player who last played for the B-team of Mladá Boleslav.

== International career ==
Zahustel made his senior debut for the Czech Republic on 13 November 2015 and scored one of the goals in a 4–1 win over Serbia.
