= Josef Šural =

Czech footballer (1990–2019)

Personal information
- Date of birth: 30 May 1990
- Place of birth: Hustopeče, Czechoslovakia
- Date of death: 29 April 2019 (aged 28)
- Place of death: Alanya, Turkey
- Height: 1.84 m (6 ft 0 in)
- Position: Forward

Youth career
- 1995–1996: Šakvice
- 1996–2008: Brno

Senior career*
Years	Team	Apps	(Gls)
2008–2011	Brno	37	(2)
2011–2016	Slovan Liberec	113	(30)
2016–2018	Sparta Prague	67	(20)
2019	Alanyaspor	9	(1)
Total		226	(53)

International career
2005–2006	Czech Republic U16	9	(2)
2006–2007	Czech Republic U17	11	(4)
2007	Czech Republic U18	6	(5)
2008–2009	Czech Republic U19	10	(3)
2013–2018	Czech Republic	20	(1)
- * Club domestic league appearances and goals

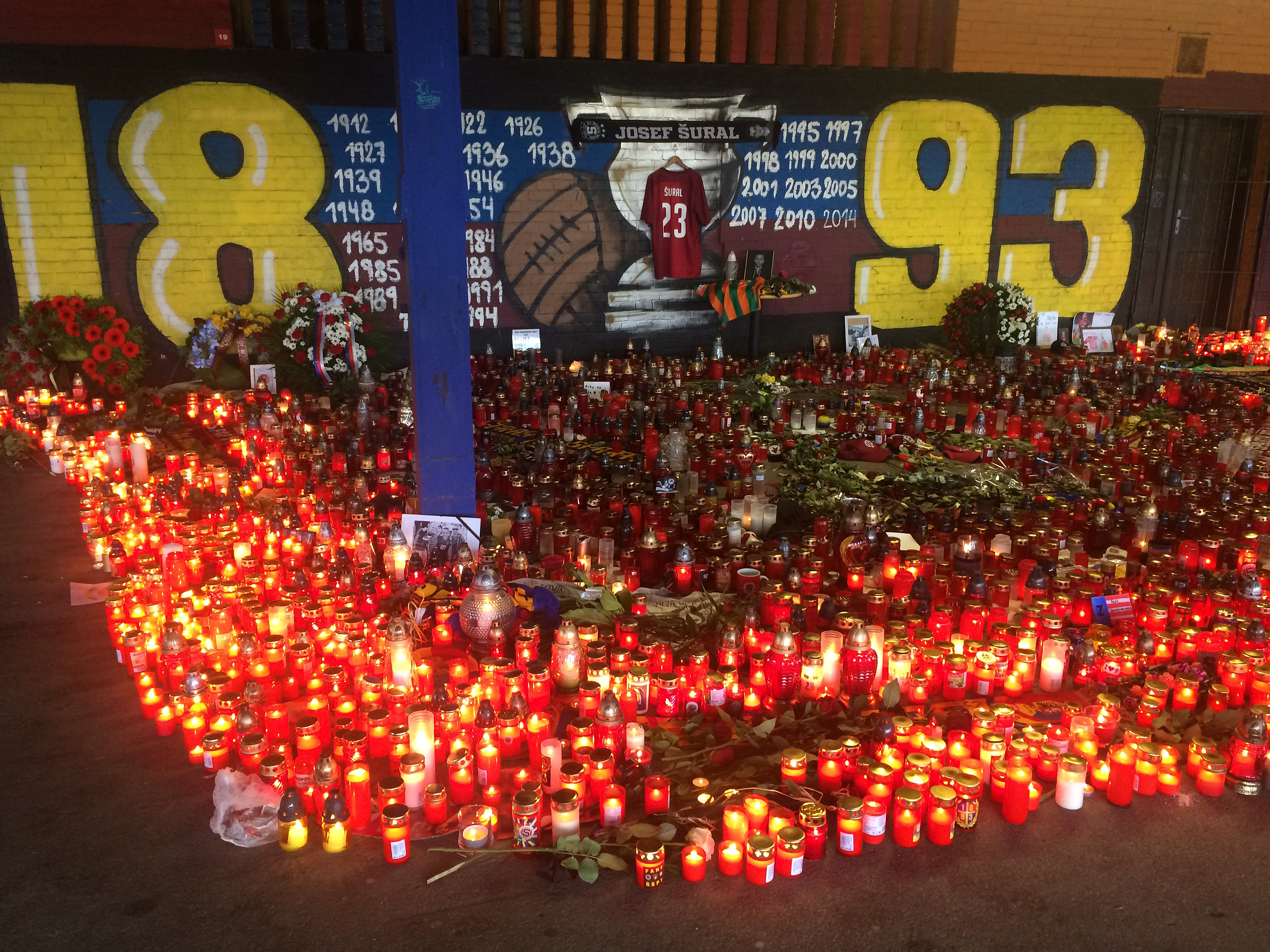
Memorial to deceased Josef Šural at the Letná Stadium, Prague presenting his Sparta shirt number

Josef Šural (30 May 1990 – 29 April 2019) was a Czech professional footballer who played as a forward.

== Career ==
In June 2011, Šural together with his Zbrojovka Brno teammate Michael Rabušic signed a three-year contract with Gambrinus liga side Slovan Liberec.

On 13 January 2016, he transferred to AC Sparta Prague.

He moved to Turkish side Alanyaspor in January 2019.

Šural played 20 international games and scored one goal. He was a part of the national team that played in Euro 2016 in France, and finished as the last of their group. Šural played in the three games as a substitute, and received a yellow card in the last game against Turkey.

== Death ==
Šural died on 29 April 2019 after being critically injured when a minibus transporting him and six other players crashed 5 kilometres (3.1 mi) from Alanya. Šural and his teammates were taken to a hospital after the crash. Šural was in critical condition and was pronounced dead shortly afterwards from his injuries. Steven Caulker, Papiss Cissé and four other players were reportedly also on the bus but were not in critical condition after surviving the crash.

== Career statistics ==
=== International ===
Appearances and goals by national team and year
National team	Year	Apps	Goals
Czech Republic	2013	1	0
Czech Republic	2015	6	1
Czech Republic	2016	8	0
Czech Republic	2017	2	0
Czech Republic	2018	3	0
Total		20	1

Scores and results list the Czech Republic's goal tally first, score column indicates score after Šural goal.

International goal scored by Josef Šural
No.	Date	Venue	Opponent	Score	Result	Competition
1	13 October 2015	Amsterdam Arena, Amsterdam, Netherlands	Netherlands	2–0	3–2	UEFA Euro 2016 qualifying

== Honours ==
Slovan Liberec

- Czech First League: 2011–12
- Czech Cup: 2014–15
