= 2023–24 AC Sparta Prague season =

AC Sparta Prague
2023–24 season
- President: Daniel Křetínský
- Head coach: Brian Priske
- Stadium: epet ARENA
- Czech First League: 1st
- Czech Cup: Winners
- UEFA Champions League: Third qualifying round
- UEFA Europa League: Round of 16
- Top goalscorer: League: Jan Kuchta (17); All: Veljko Birmančević (22)
- Average home league attendance: 17,084

The 2023–24 season was Athletic Club Sparta Praha's 130th season in existence and 31st consecutive in the Czech First League. They also competed in the Czech Cup and the UEFA Europa League. The club were eliminated in the third qualifying round of the UEFA Champions League by Copenhagen.

== Players ==
=== First-team squad ===
As of 25 July 2023

Note: Flags indicate national team as defined under FIFA eligibility rules; some limited exceptions apply. Players may hold more than one non-FIFA nationality.

No.	Pos.	Nation	Player
1	GK	DEN	Peter Vindahl Jensen (on loan from AZ Alkmaar)
5	DF	GAM	James Gomez
6	MF	FIN	Kaan Kairinen
7	FW	NGR	Victor Olatunji
8	MF	CZE	David Pavelka
9	FW	CZE	Jan Kuchta
10	MF	CZE	Adam Karabec
11	MF	BUL	Martin Minchev
13	MF	CZE	Kryštof Daněk
14	MF	SRB	Veljko Birmančević (on loan from Toulouse)
17	DF	DEN	Casper Højer Nielsen
18	MF	CZE	Lukáš Sadílek
19	DF	CZE	Jan Mejdr
20	MF	ALB	Qazim Laçi
21	MF	CZE	Jakub Pešek

No.	Pos.	Nation	Player
22	MF	SVK	Lukáš Haraslín
24	GK	CZE	Vojtěch Vorel
25	DF	DEN	Asger Sørensen
26	DF	CZE	Patrik Vydra
27	DF	CZE	Filip Panák
28	DF	CZE	Tomáš Wiesner
29	MF	CZE	Michal Ševčík
30	DF	CZE	Jaroslav Zelený
32	MF	CZE	Matěj Ryneš
37	MF	CZE	Ladislav Krejčí (captain)
39	FW	CZE	Václav Sejk
41	DF	CZE	Martin Vitík
44	GK	SVK	Jakub Surovčík
45	GK	CZE	Filip Nalezinek

=== Out on loan ===
Note: Flags indicate national team as defined under FIFA eligibility rules; some limited exceptions apply. Players may hold more than one non-FIFA nationality.

No.	Pos.	Nation	Player
—	DF	CZE	Dominik Plechatý (at Slovan Liberec)
—	DF	CZE	Matěj Polidar (at Jablonec)
—	MF	CZE	Filip Souček (at Jablonec)

No.	Pos.	Nation	Player
—	DF	CZE	Martin Suchomel (at Mladá Boleslav)
—	MF	CZE	Jan Fortelný (at Sigma Olomouc)
—	FW	CZE	Matyáš Kozák (at Bohemians 1905)

== Transfers ==
=== In ===
Pos.	Player	Transferred from	Fee	Date	Source
MF	(Czech Republic) Michal Ševčík	(Czech Republic) Zbrojovka Brno	Undisclosed	19 June 2023	
MF	(Serbia) Veljko Birmančević	(France) Toulouse	Loan	22 June 2023	
FW	(Nigeria) Victor Olatunji	(Czech Republic) Slovan Liberec	Undisclosed	17 July 2023	
DF	(The Gambia) James Gomez	(Denmark) AC Horsens	Undisclosed	19 July 2023	
GK	(Denmark) Peter Vindahl Jensen	(Netherlands) AZ	Loan	25 July 2023	
DF	(Ecuador) Ángelo Preciado	(Belgium) Genk	€2,500,000	4 September 2023	

=== Out ===
Pos.	Player	Transferred to	Fee	Date	Source
FW	(Czech Republic) Tomáš Čvančara	(Germany) Borussia Mönchengladbach	€10,500,000	14 July 2023	
MF	(Czech Republic) Michal Trávník	(Czech Republic) Slovácko	Undisclosed	17 July 2023	
DF	(Norway) Andreas Vindheim	(Czech Republic) Teplice	Loan	7 September 2023	
MF	(Czech Republic) Kryštof Daněk	(Czech Republic) Pardubice	Loan	8 September 2023	
DF	(Denmark) Casper Højer	(Turkey) Çaykur Rizespor	Undisclosed	10 September 2023	
FW	(Bulgaria) Martin Minchev	(Turkey) Çaykur Rizespor	Undisclosed	10 September 2023	

== Pre-season and friendlies ==
30 June 2023 Friendly	Sparta Prague (Czech Republic)	1–2	(Czech Republic) Vysočina Jihlava	Prague
14:00 UTC+2				Stadium: TC Strahov (hřiště č. 1)

7 July 2023 Friendly	Dinamo Zagreb (Croatia)	1–1	(Czech Republic) Sparta Prague	Kranj, Slovenia
16:00 UTC+2	Petković 14' (pen.)		Pešek 2'	Stadium: Nacionalni Nogometni Center Brdo

11 July 2023 Friendly	Čukarički (Serbia)	1–1	(Czech Republic) Sparta Prague	Seeboden, Austria
16:30 UTC+2				Stadium: Sportarena Seeboden

== Competitions ==
=== Overall record ===
Competition	First match	Last match	Starting round	Final position	Record							
Competition	First match	Last match	Starting round	Final position	Pld	W	D	L	GF	GA	GD	Win %
Czech First League	23 July 2023	26 May 2024	Matchday 1		22	19	2	1	55	15	+40	86.36
Czech Cup	27 September 2023		Third round		2	2	0	0	3	1	+2	100.00
UEFA Champions League	8 August 2023	15 August 2023	Third qualifying round	Third qualifying round	2	0	2	0	3	3	+0	0.00
UEFA Europa League	24 August 2023		Play-off round		12	5	1	6	22	26	−4	41.67
Total					38	26	5	7	83	45	+38	68.42

Last updated: 25 February 2024
Source: Soccerway

=== Czech First League ===
==== League table ====
Pos	Team	Pld	W	D	L	GF	GA	GD	Pts	Qualification or relegation
1	Sparta Prague	30	24	4	2	70	26	+44	76	Qualification for the Championship group
2	Slavia Prague	30	22	6	2	62	23	+39	72	Qualification for the Championship group
3	Viktoria Plzeň	30	19	5	6	67	33	+34	62	Qualification for the Championship group
4	Baník Ostrava	30	13	6	11	48	39	+9	45	Qualification for the Championship group
5	Mladá Boleslav	30	12	8	10	50	46	+4	44	Qualification for the Championship group

Source: Fortuna Liga
Rules for classification: 1) Points; 2) Head-to-head points; 3) Head-to-head goal difference; 4) Head-to-head goals scored; 5) Goal difference; 6) Goals scored; 7) Fair-play ranking; 8) Draw.

Pos	Team	Pld	W	D	L	GF	GA	GD	Pts	Qualification or relegation	SPA	SLA	PLZ	OST	MLA	SLO
1	Sparta Prague (C)	35	27	6	2	82	30	+52	87	Qualification for the Champions League second qualifying round	—	0–0	1–1	2–1	—	—
2	Slavia Prague	35	26	7	2	76	24	+52	85	Qualification for the Champions League third qualifying round (Note: Since the Europa League winners, Atalanta qualified for the Champions League via league position, Slavia Prague were promoted from the Champions League second qualifying round to the third qualifying round as one of the two teams with the highest coefficient in the second qualifying round.)	—	—	3–0	5–0	4–0	—
3	Viktoria Plzeň	35	21	7	7	76	40	+36	70	Qualification for the Europa League third qualifying round	—	—	—	1–1	3–0	4–2
4	Baník Ostrava	35	14	7	14	56	48	+8	49	Qualification for the Conference League second qualifying round	—	—	—	—	0–1	6–0
5	Mladá Boleslav (O)	35	13	8	14	51	59	−8	47	Qualification for the Conference League play-off final	0–5	—	—	—	—	0–1
6	Slovácko	35	12	8	15	45	56	−11	44		2–4	1–2	—	—	—	—

Source: Fortuna Liga
Legend: Blue = home team win; Yellow = draw; Red = away team win.
Rules for classification: 1) Total points; 2) Points earned in regular season; 3) Head-to-head points (regular season); 4) Head-to-head goal difference (regular season); 5) Head-to-head goals scored (regular season); 5) Goal difference (all matches); 6) Goals scored (all matches); 7) Fair-play ranking; 8) Draw.
(C) Champions; (O) Play-off winners
Notes:

Pos	Team	Pld	W	D	L	GF	GA	GD	Pts	Qualification or relegation	JAB	PCE	BOH	KAR	CBU	ZLN
11	Jablonec	35	9	14	12	45	50	−5	41		—	3–0	—	3–2	—	1–0
12	Pardubice	35	11	7	17	39	47	−8	40		—	—	—	4–0	3–2	2–0
13	Bohemians 1905	35	9	12	14	34	48	−14	39		1–1	0–1	—	1–3	—	—
14	Karviná (O)	35	8	8	19	38	62	−24	32	Qualification for the relegation play-offs	—	—	—	—	1–0	2–2
15	České Budějovice (O)	35	7	8	20	41	70	−29	29	Qualification for the relegation play-offs	2–2	—	2–1	—	—	—
16	Zlín (R)	35	5	12	18	40	69	−29	27	Relegation to FNL	—	—	1–2	—	1–1	—

Source: Fortuna Liga
Legend: Blue = home team win; Yellow = draw; Red = away team win.
Rules for classification: 1) Total points; 2) Points earned in regular season; 3) Head-to-head points (regular season); 4) Head-to-head goal difference (regular season); 5) Head-to-head goals scored (regular season); 5) Goal difference (all matches); 6) Goals scored (all matches); 7) Fair-play ranking; 8) Draw.
(O) Play-off winners; (R) Relegated

==== Results summary ====
Overall								Home						Away					
Pld	W	D	L	GF	GA	GD	Pts	W	D	L	GF	GA	GD	W	D	L	GF	GA	GD
22	19	2	1	55	15	+40	59	11	0	0	32	6	+26	8	2	1	23	9	+14

Last updated: 25 February 2024.
Source: FORTUNA:LIGA

==== Results by round ====
Round	1	2	3	4	5	6	7	8	9	10	11	12	13	14	15	16	17	18	19	20	21	22	23	24	25	26	27	28	29	30
Ground	H	A	H	A	A	H	A	H	A	H	A	H	A	H	A	H	A	H	H	A	H	A	H	A	H	A	H	A	H	A
Result	W	W	W	W	D	W	W	W	D	W	W	W	L	W	W	W	W	W	W	W	W	W								
Position	5	2	1	1	2	1	1	1	1																					

Updated to match(es) played on 24 September 2023. Source: FORTUNA:LIGA
A = Away; H = Home; W = Win; D = Draw; L = Loss

==== Matches ====
The league fixtures were unveiled on 21 June 2023.

23 July 2023 1	Sparta Prague	2–0	Sigma Olomouc	Prague
18:00 UTC+2	Haraslín 16', 55'	Report	Vraštil (yellow card) 5'; Pospíšil (yellow card) 9'	Stadium: epet ARENA; Attendance: 17,153; Referee: Ladislav Szikszay

29 July 2023 2	Zlín	0–1	Sparta Prague	Zlín
15:00 UTC+2	Cedidla (yellow card) 27'; Žák (yellow card) 29'; Didiba (yellow card) 79'; Janetzký (yellow card) 84'	Report	Laci (yellow card) 31'; Krejčí 80' (pen.)	Stadium: Letná Stadion; Attendance: 5,521; Referee: Dalibor Černý

5 August 2023 3	Sparta Prague	5–2	Pardubice	Prague
15:00 UTC+2	Kuchta 15', 24'; Haraslín 22'; Zelený (yellow card) 34'; Wiesner 47'; Birmančević 56'	Report	Surzyn (yellow card) 45+4'; Darmovzal 65'; Krobot 73'	Stadium: epet ARENA; Attendance: 16,911; Referee: Tomáš Klíma

12 August 2023 4	Jablonec	1–5	Sparta Prague	Jablonec nad Nisou
18:00 UTC+2	Martinec (yellow card) 56'; Drchal 60'; Alégué (yellow card) 73'; Černák (yellow card) 90+1'	Report	Vitík 12', 27'; Minchev 35'; Kairinen 39'; Sejk (yellow card) 44'; Wiesner 45+1'; Sadílek (yellow card) 88'	Stadium: Stadion Střelnice; Attendance: 5,684; Referee: Tomáš Batík

19 August 2023 5	Teplice	1–1	Sparta Prague	Teplice
18:00 UTC+2	Frťala (not on pitch) (yellow card) 45+6'; Fila (yellow card) 46'; Hora (yellow card) 59'; Yasser 85'	Report	Kuchta 35'; Krejčí (red card) 45+3'; Loučka (not on pitch) (yellow card) 45+6'	Stadium: Na Stínadlech; Attendance: 15,840; Referee: Stanislav Volek

27 August 2023 6	Sparta Prague	3–1	Karviná	Prague
18:00 UTC+2	Karabec 6', (red card) 57'; Ryneš 27'; Pavelka 87'	Report	Bartl (yellow card) 75'; Mikuš 82'	Stadium: epet ARENA; Attendance: 16,256; Referee: Jan Machálek

3 September 2023 7	Slovan Liberec	0–2	Sparta Prague	Liberec
15:00 UTC+2	Červ (yellow card) 44'; Prebsl (yellow card) 61'; Pourzitidis (yellow card) 66' (yellow-red card) 87'; Kozel (not on pitch) (yellow card) 67'	Report	Zelený (yellow card) 44'; Olatunji (yellow card) 50'; Haraslín 69', 77'	Stadium: Stadion u Nisy; Attendance: 7,627; Referee: Ladislav Szikszay

17 September 2023 8	Sparta Prague	5–0	Slovácko	Prague
18:00 UTC+2	Birmančević 11', 70'; Wiesner 20'; Haraslín 45+1'; Olatunji 81'	Report	Valenta (yellow card) 45+1'; Doski (yellow card) 90'	Stadium: epet ARENA; Attendance: 17,039; Referee: Jan Všetečka

24 September 2023 9	Slavia Prague	1–1	Sparta Prague	Prague
18:00 UTC+2	Jurečka 58' (pen.); Ogbu (yellow card) 69'; Zafeiris (yellow card) 81'; Bořil (red card) 88'; Chytil (yellow card) 90'; Wallem (yellow card) 90+1'; Schranz (yellow card) 90+5'	Report	Preciado (yellow card) 22'; Olatunji (yellow card) 32'; Panák (yellow card) 73'; Laçi (yellow card) 82'; Pešek (yellow card) 84'; Krejčí (red card) 88'; Haraslín 90+10' (pen.), (yellow card) 90+11'	Stadium: Fortuna Arena; Attendance: 19,370; Referee: Ladislav Szikszay

30 September 2023 10	Sparta Prague	2–1	Viktoria Plzeň	Prague
18:00 UTC+2	Laçi 3'; Kuchta 27'; Preciado (yellow card) 80'; Jensen (yellow card) (after the match)	Report	Dweh (yellow card) 8'; Durosinmi 26'; Cadu (yellow card) 60'; Staněk (yellow card) (after the match)	Stadium: epet ARENA; Attendance: 17,791; Referee: Ondřej Pechanec

8 October 2023 11	Hradec Králové	1–3	Sparta Prague	Hradec Králové
15:00 UTC+2	Pilař 64'	Report	Olatunji (red card) 11'; Karabec 15', 34'; Friis (not on pitch) (yellow card) 20'; Wiesner (yellow card) 69'; Kuchta 71'	Stadium: Malšovická aréna Attendance: 9,300; Referee: Petr Hocek

22 October 2023 12	Sparta Prague	4–0	České Budějovice	Prague
15:00 UTC+2	Kairinen 17', (yellow card) 40'; Pešek 45'; Sørensen 46'; Panák (yellow card) 69'; Ševčík 76'	Report		Stadium: epet ARENA; Attendance: 16,537; Referee: Ondřej Berka

29 October 2023 13	Mladá Boleslav	3–1	Sparta Prague	Mladá Boleslav
15:00 UTC+1	Kušej 24'; Matějovský 45'; Jawo 87'	Report	Pešek 29'; Kuchta (yellow card) 86'; Ryneš (yellow card) 90+3'; Sejk (yellow card) 90+3'	Stadium: Lokotrans Aréna; Attendance: 5,000; Referee: Dalibor Černý

4 November 2023 14	Sparta Prague	2–0	Bohemians 1905	Prague
18:00 UTC+1	Birmančević (yellow card) 37', (goal) 68' (pen.); Friis (not on pitch) (yellow card) 37'; Wiesner (yellow card) 71'; Sadílek 81'; Sørensen (yellow card) 88'	Report	Prekop (yellow card) 29'; Shejbal (yellow card) 90'; Köstl (yellow card) 90+5'	Stadium: epet ARENA; Attendance: 17,411; Referee: Marek Radina

12 November 2023 15	Baník Ostrava	0–1	Sparta Prague	Ostrava
15:00 UTC+1	Ewerton (yellow card) 27'; Kubala (yellow card) 32'; Lischka (yellow card) 32'; Bernady (not on pitch) (yellow card) 64'; Ndefe (yellow card) 76'	Report	Kuchta (yellow card) 34'; Priske (not on pitch) (yellow card) 45'; Panák 49'; Loučka (not on pitch) (yellow card) 64'; Jensen (yellow card) 90+9'	Stadium: Městský stadion Attendance: 15,081; Referee: Jan Petřík

26 November 2023 16	Sparta Prague	2–0	Zlín	Prague
18:00 UTC+1	Birmančević 3', 40'	Report	Černín (yellow card) 30'	Stadium: epet ARENA; Attendance: 16,877; Referee: Jan Všetečka

3 December 2023 17	Pardubice	1–2	Sparta Prague	Pardubice
15:00 UTC+1	Zlatohlávek 26'; Vacek (yellow card) 79'; Ortíz (yellow card) 90+7'; Mikula (not on pitch) (yellow card) 90+9'	Report	Krejčí 19', 65'; Kuchta (yellow card) 79'; Kairinen (yellow card) 90+9'	Stadium: CFIG Arena; Attendance: 4,620; Referee: Dalibor Černý

9 December 2023 18	Sparta Prague	3–0	Jablonec	Prague
15:00 UTC+1	Kuchta 15'; Haraslín 17'; Preciado 24'; Vitík (red card) 58'; Laçi (yellow card) 64'	Report	Alégué (yellow card) 39'; Štěpánek (yellow card) 54'; Kratochvíl (yellow card) 69'	Stadium: epet ARENA; Attendance: 16,111; Referee: Ondřej Pechanec

17 December 2023 19	Sparta Prague	2–1	Teplice	Prague
18:00 UTC+1	Sadílek (red card) 4'; Krejčí (yellow card) 30', (goal) 72'; Olatunji 90'	Report	Chaloupek (yellow card) 8'; Yasser 13'; Křišťan (yellow card) 48'; Tsykalo (yellow card) 90+6'	Stadium: epet ARENA; Attendance: 16,530; Referee: Dominik Starý

10 February 2024 20	Karviná	0–3	Sparta Prague	Karviná
15:00 UTC+1	Holec (yellow card) 60'; E. Muryc (not on pitch) (yellow card) 69'; Bederka (yellow card) 90+2'	Report	Krejčí 31'; Karabec 60'; Kuchta 69'	Stadium: Městský stadion Attendance: 4,238; Referee: Karel Rouček

18 February 2024 21	Sparta Prague	2–1	Slovan Liberec	Prague
18:00 UTC+1	Pešek (yellow card) 24'; Haraslín 47'; Olatunji 49'; F. Hrdlička (not on pitch) (yellow card) 75'; Wiesner (yellow card) 84'	Report	Horský 68', (yellow card) 79'	Stadium: epet ARENA; Attendance: 16,829; Referee: Jan Všetečka

25 February 2024 22	Slovácko	1–3	Sparta Prague	Uherské Hradiště
18:00 UTC+1	Juroška 21'	Report	Vitík 11'; Birmančević 56'; Haraslín 76'	Stadium: Městský fotbalový stadion Miroslava Valenty

3 March 2024 23	Sparta Prague	0–0	Slavia Prague	Prague
18:00 UTC+1		Report		Stadium: epet ARENA

10 March 2024 24	Viktoria Plzeň	4–0	Sparta Prague	Plzeň
18:00 UTC+1		Report		Stadium: Doosan Arena

16 March 2024 25	Sparta Prague	2–1	Hradec Králové	Prague
18:00 UTC+1		Report		Stadium: epet ARENA

30 March 2024 26	České Budějovice	0–1	Sparta Prague	České Budějovice
18:00 UTC+1		Report		Stadium: Stadion Střelecký ostrov

7 April 2024 27	Sparta Prague	1–1	Mladá Boleslav	Prague
18:00 UTC+1		Report		Stadium: epet ARENA

13 April 2024 28	Bohemians 1905	1–3	Sparta Prague	Prague
15:00 UTC+1		Report		Stadium: Ďolíček

20 April 2024 29	Sparta Prague	4–3	Baník Ostrava	Prague
15:00 UTC+1		Report		Stadium: epet ARENA

28 April 2024 30	Sigma Olomouc	1–4	Sparta Prague	Olomouc
15:00 UTC+1		Report		Stadium: Andrův stadion

=== Czech Cup ===
27 September 2023 Third round	Líšeň	0–1	Sparta Prague	Brno
15:00	Jokovič (yellow card) 90'; Jeřábek (yellow card) 90+4'	Report	Ševčík 48'; Ryneš (yellow card) 81'; Vorel (yellow card) 90+3'	Stadium: Stadion SK Líšeň; Attendance: 1,735; Referee: Jan Petřík

1 November 2023 Fourth round	Bohemians 1905	1–2	Sparta Prague	Prague
16:30	Kadlec (yellow card) 16', (goal) 22'; Vondra (yellow card) 25'; Hybš (yellow card) 78'	Report	Sejk (yellow card) 34', (goal) 52'; Ševčík 69'; Pavelka (yellow card) 90+2'; Mejdr (yellow card) 90+3'	Stadium: Ďolíček; Attendance: 5,012; Referee: Jan Petřík

28 February 2024 Quarter-finals	Slavia Prague	2–3 (a.e.t.)	Sparta Prague	Prague
16:00				Stadium: Fortuna Arena

=== UEFA Champions League ===
==== Third qualifying round ====
The draw for the third qualifying round was held on 24 July 2023.

8 August 2023 First leg	Copenhagen (Denmark)	0–0	(Czech Republic) Sparta Prague	Copenhagen, Denmark
20:00		Report		Stadium: Parken Stadium; Attendance: 27,170; Referee: Benoît Bastien (France)

15 August 2023 Second leg	Sparta Prague (Czech Republic)	3–3 (a.e.t.) (3–3 agg.) (2–4 p)	(Denmark) Copenhagen	Prague, Czech Republic
19:00	Birmančević 80'; Laçi 105'; Olatunji 107'	Report	Larsson 1'; Claesson 105+2', 112'	Stadium: epet ARENA; Attendance: 18,109; Referee: Serdar Gözübüyük (Netherlands)
	Penalties
	Krejčí (penalty missed); Laçi (penalty scored); Kairinen (penalty scored); Sørensen (penalty missed)		(penalty scored) Diks; (penalty scored) Claesson; (penalty scored) Boilesen; (penalty scored) Bardghji

=== UEFA Europa League ===
==== Play-off round ====
24 August 2023 First leg	Dinamo Zagreb (Croatia)	3–1	(Czech Republic) Sparta Prague	Zagreb, Croatia
20:00	Špikić 44'; Perić 59'; Ivanušec 61'	Report	Krejčí 39' (pen.)	Stadium: Stadion Maksimir; Attendance: 12,170; Referee: Marco Guida (Italy)

31 August 2023 Second leg	Sparta Prague (Czech Republic)	4–1 (5–4 agg.)	(Croatia) Dinamo Zagreb	Prague, Czech Republic
19:00	Haraslín 2'; Sørensen 24'; Panák 67'; Olatunji 87'	Report	Baturina 71'	Stadium: epet ARENA; Attendance: 17,953; Referee: Tobias Stieler (Germany)

==== Group stage ====
Pos	Team	Pld	W	D	L	GF	GA	GD	Pts	Qualification	RAN	SPP	BET	ALI
1	(Scotland) Rangers	6	3	2	1	8	6	+2	11	Advance to round of 16	—	2–1	1–0	1–1
2	(Czech Republic) Sparta Prague	6	3	1	2	9	7	+2	10	Advance to knockout round play-offs	0–0	—	1–0	3–2
3	(Spain) Real Betis	6	3	0	3	9	7	+2	9	Transfer to Europa Conference League	2–3	2–1	—	4–1
4	(Cyprus) Aris Limassol	6	1	1	4	7	13	−6	4		2–1	1–3	0–1	—

Source: UEFA
Rules for classification: Group stage tiebreakers

21 September 2023 1	Sparta Prague (Czech Republic)	3–2	(Cyprus) Aris Limassol	Prague, Czech Republic
21:00	Krejčí (yellow card) 9', (goal) 20', 25'; Vitík 67'; Sørensen (yellow card) 70'; Pavelka (yellow card) 87'	Report	Kokorin 11' (pen.), (yellow card) 70'; Shpilevsky (not on pitch) (yellow card) 25'; Babicka 90'	Stadium: epet ARENA; Attendance: 17,371; Referee: Jérôme Brisard (France)

5 October 2023 2	Real Betis (Spain)	2–1	(Czech Republic) Sparta Prague	Seville, Spain
18:45	Diao 9', (yellow card) 45+4'; Rodríguez (yellow card) 11'; Ruibal (yellow card) 58'; Isco 79'; Vinícius (yellow card) 90+2'	Report	Birmančević 3', (yellow card) 45+5'; Haraslín (yellow card) 15'; Ryneš (yellow card) 76'	Stadium: Benito Villamarín; Attendance: 45,037; Referee: Duje Strukan (Croatia)

26 October 2023 3	Sparta Prague (Czech Republic)	0–0	(Scotland) Rangers	Prague, Czech Republic
18:45	Panák (yellow card) 70'	Report	Cantwell (yellow card) 17'; Souttar (yellow card) 26'; Goldson (yellow card) 63'; Sima (yellow card) 82'	Stadium: epet ARENA; Attendance: 18,250; Referee: Sascha Stegemann (Germany)

9 November 2023 4	Rangers (Scotland)	2–1	(Czech Republic) Sparta Prague	Glasgow, Scotland
21:00 (20:00 GMT)	Danilo 11'; Cantwell 20'; Barišić (yellow card) 58'; Tavernier (yellow card) 89'; Lammers (yellow card) 90+3'; Goldson (yellow card) 90+8'	Report	Gomez (yellow card) 37'; Vitík (yellow card) 45+1'; Haraslín 77'; Laçi (yellow card) 79'; Preciado (yellow card) 90+5'	Stadium: Ibrox Stadium; Attendance: 48,838; Referee: Davide Massa (Italy)

30 November 2023 5	Sparta Prague (Czech Republic)	1–0	(Spain) Real Betis	Prague, Czech Republic
18:45	Birmančević (yellow card) 38'; Haraslín 54'	Report	Ruibal (yellow card) 22'; Pezzella (yellow card) 70'; Miranda (yellow card) 88'; Rodríguez (yellow card) 90+2'	Stadium: epet ARENA; Attendance: 18,095; Referee: Nikola Dabanović (Montenegro)

14 December 2023 6	Aris Limassol (Cyprus)	1–3	(Czech Republic) Sparta Prague	Limassol, Cyprus
21:00 (22:00 EET)	Cajú (yellow card) 77'; Bengtsson 84'; Brown (yellow card) 86'; Brorsson (yellow card) 90+2'	Report	Krejčí (yellow card) 3'; Kuchta 4'; Birmančević 11', 45+1'; Kairinen (yellow card) 87'	Stadium: Alphamega Stadium; Attendance: 2,859; Referee: Harm Osmers (Germany)

==== Knockout phase ====
===== Knockout round play-offs =====
15 February 2024 First leg	Galatasaray (Turkey)	3–2	(Czech Republic) Sparta Prague	Istanbul, Turkey
18:45 (20:45 TRT)	Demirbay 19'; Yılmaz (yellow card) 47'; Mertens 61'; Nelsson (red card) 62'; Aktürkoğlu (yellow card) 82'; Icardi 90+1'	Report	Laçi (yellow card) 41'; Preciado 47'; Ryneš (yellow card) 50' (yellow-red card) 80'; Kuchta 65'; Birmančević (yellow card) 79'; Krejčí (yellow card) 82'	Stadium: Rams Park; Attendance: 46,583; Referee: Alejandro Hernández Hernández (Spain)

22 February 2024 Second leg	Sparta Prague (Czech Republic)	4–1 (6–4 agg.)	(Turkey) Galatasaray	Prague, Czech Republic
21:00	Preciado 8', (yellow card) 85'; Sørensen (yellow card) 31'; Tuci 74'; Kuchta (yellow card) 76'; Haraslín 80'; Kuchta 90+6'; Priske (not on pitch) (yellow card) 90+7'	Report	Bardakcı 16'; Demirbay (yellow card) 22'; Kutlu (yellow card) 24'; Ayhan (red card) 68'; Vinícius (yellow card) 90+7'; Buruk (not on pitch) (red card) 90+8'	Stadium: epet ARENA; Attendance: 18,205; Referee: Anthony Taylor (England)

===== Round of 16 =====
7 March 2024 First leg	Sparta Prague (Czech Republic)	1–5	(England) Liverpool	Prague, Czech Republic
	Bradley 46' (o.g.); Krejčí (yellow card) 62'; Zelený (yellow card) 73'	Report	Mac Allister 6' (pen.); Núñez 25', 45+3'; Díaz 53'; Szoboszlai 90+4'	Stadium: epet ARENA; Referee: José María Sánchez Martínez (Spain)

14 March 2024 Second leg	Liverpool (England)	6–1 (11–2 agg.)	(Czech Republic) Sparta Prague	Liverpool, England
20:00 GMT	Núñez 7'; Clark 8'; Salah 10'; Gakpo 14', 55'; Szoboszlai 48'; Quansah (yellow card) 65'	Report	Birmančević 42'	Stadium: Anfield; Referee: Artur Soares Dias (Portugal)

== Statistics ==
=== Appearances and goals ===
As of 26 May 2024

No.	Pos	Nat	Player	Total		Czech First League		Czech Cup		Champions League		Europa League	
No.	Pos	Nat	Player	Apps	Goals	Apps	Goals	Apps	Goals	Apps	Goals	Apps	Goals
Goalkeepers
1	GK	(Denmark) DEN	Peter Vindahl Jensen	47	0	33	0	0	0	2	0	12	0
24	GK	(Czech Republic) CZE	Vojtěch Vorel	7	0	2	0	5	0	0	0	0	0
Defenders
17	DF	(Ecuador) ECU	Ángelo Preciado	26	3	11+2	1	3	0	0	0	9+1	2
19	DF	(Czech Republic) CZE	Jan Mejdr	10	0	4+2	0	2	0	1+1	0	0	0
25	DF	(Denmark) DEN	Asger Sørensen	39	2	23+2	1	1+1	0	2	0	10	1
26	DF	(Czech Republic) CZE	Patrik Vydra	14	1	3+5	1	2+1	0	0	0	0+3	0
27	DF	(Czech Republic) CZE	Filip Panák	42	2	27+3	1	3	0	2	0	6+1	1
28	DF	(Czech Republic) CZE	Tomáš Wiesner	39	3	18+10	3	0+2	0	1	0	4+4	0
30	DF	(Czech Republic) CZE	Jaroslav Zelený	38	1	14+8	1	4+1	0	2	0	7+2	0
41	DF	(Czech Republic) CZE	Martin Vitík	42	5	22+5	4	3+1	0	0+2	0	9	1
Midfielders
4	MF	(Norway) NOR	Markus Solbakken	18	0	5+7	0	1+2	0	0	0	2+1	0
6	MF	(Finland) FIN	Kaan Kairinen	44	2	21+7	2	1+1	0	2	0	12	0
8	MF	(Czech Republic) CZE	David Pavelka	10	1	4+2	1	2	0	0	0	0+2	0
10	MF	(Czech Republic) CZE	Adam Karabec	30	5	10+11	4	1+1	1	0	0	2+5	0
14	MF	(Serbia) SRB	Veljko Birmančević	48	22	29+3	16	3	1	2	1	9+2	4
18	MF	(Czech Republic) CZE	Lukáš Sadílek	48	1	24+8	1	3+1	0	2	0	2+8	0
20	MF	(Albania) ALB	Qazim Laçi	43	2	16+11	1	2	0	0+2	1	9+3	0
21	MF	(Czech Republic) CZE	Jakub Pešek	30	2	7+13	2	1+1	0	0+2	0	0+6	0
22	MF	(Slovakia) SVK	Lukáš Haraslín	44	16	22+7	12	1+1	0	2	0	8+3	4
29	MF	(Czech Republic) CZE	Michal Ševčík	8	3	0+5	1	2+1	2	0	0	0	0
32	MF	(Czech Republic) CZE	Matěj Ryneš	40	1	21+7	1	3+2	0	0	0	5+2	0
33	MF	(Czech Republic) CZE	Roman Horák	1	0	0	0	0+1	0	0	0	0	0
37	MF	(Czech Republic) CZE	Ladislav Krejčí	39	11	25+1	8	2	0	2	0	9	3
Forwards
7	FW	(Nigeria) NGR	Victor Olatunji	47	8	7+23	3	2+3	3	0+1	1	5+6	1
9	FW	(Czech Republic) CZE	Jan Kuchta	49	21	28+4	17	2+1	1	2	0	11+1	3
11	FW	(Albania) ALB	Indrit Tuci	14	1	3+6	0	2	0	0	0	0+3	1
39	FW	(Czech Republic) CZE	Václav Sejk	16	1	1+11	0	2	1	0	0	0+2	0
49	FW	(Czech Republic) CZE	Tomáš Schánělec	2	0	0	0	0+2	0	0	0	0	0
Players transferred out during the season
5	DF	(The Gambia) GAM	James Gomez	8	0	3+2	0	2	0	0	0	1	0
11	FW	(Bulgaria) BUL	Martin Minchev	6	1	2+1	1	0	0	0+2	0	0+1	0
