= Ángelo Preciado =

Ecuadorian footballer (born 1998)

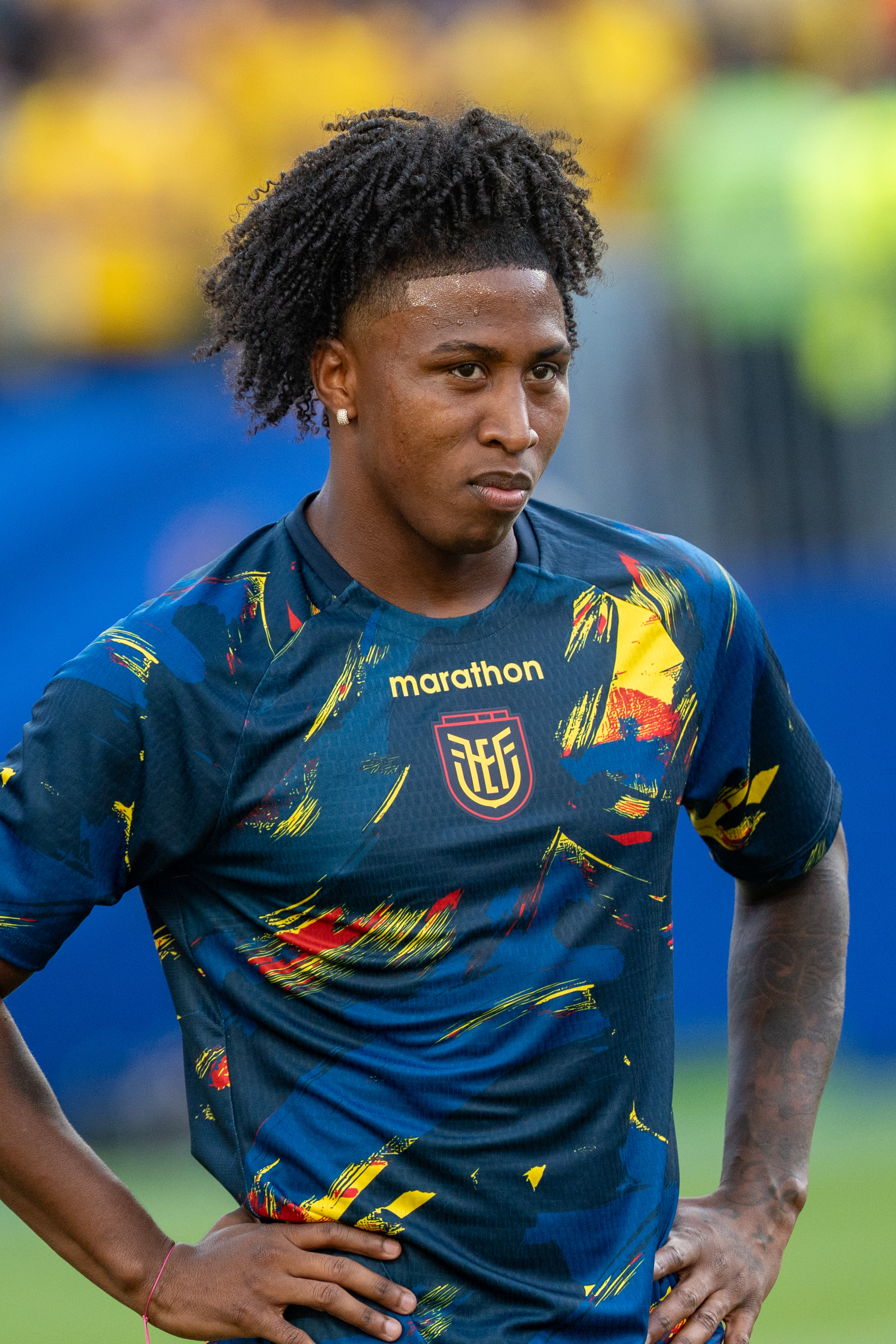
- Preciado with Ecuador in 2026

Personal information
- Full name: Ángelo Smit Preciado Quiñónez
- Date of birth: 18 February 1998 (age 28)
- Place of birth: Shushufindi, Ecuador
- Height: 1.74 m (5 ft 9 in)
- Positions: Right-back; winger

Team information
- Current team: Atlético Mineiro
- Number: 23

Youth career
- 2014–2015: América de Quito
- 2015–2018: Independiente del Valle

Senior career*
Years	Team	Apps	(Gls)
2018	Independiente Juniors	0	(0)
2018–2020	Independiente del Valle	65	(6)
2021–2023	Genk	59	(0)
2023–2026	Sparta Prague	37	(1)
2026–	Atlético Mineiro	17	(0)

International career^{‡}
2017	Ecuador U20	3	(0)
2018–	Ecuador	61	(0)
- * Club domestic league appearances and goals as of 23:01, 29 August 2026 (UTC) ‡ National team caps and goals as of 5 October 2026

Ángelo Smit Preciado Quiñónez (born 18 February 1998) is an Ecuadorian professional footballer who plays as a right-back or winger for Campeonato Brasileiro Série A club Atlético Mineiro and the Ecuador national team.

== Club career ==
Born in Shushufindi, Sucumbíos, Preciado joined Independiente del Valle's youth setup in 2015, from América de Quito. In February 2018, during the semifinals of the 2018 U-20 Copa Libertadores, he went viral after using the corner flag to defend himself from a fight with the River Plate Montevideo players.

Promoted to the first team after playing a short period in the reserve team, Independiente Juniors, Preciado made his senior – and Serie A – debut on 9 July 2018, starting in a 3–1 away loss against Aucas. He soon became a regular starter, and scored his first goals on 25 August by netting a brace in a 4–2 home defeat of El Nacional.

On 28 December 2020, Belgian Pro League club Genk announced the signing of Preciado on a two-and-a-half-year contract, with an option for a further two years, for a reported fee of €3 million. He made his debut for the Belgian club on 16 January 2021, starting in a 2–0 away loss at Royal Excel Mouscron.

On 4 September 2023, Czech First League club Sparta Prague announced the signing of Preciado for a reported fee of €2.5 million, which could increase to €3 million with add-ons. On 15 February 2024, he scored his first goal in the UEFA Europa League in a 3–2 defeat to Galatasaray.

On 16 January 2026, Preciado joined Campeonato Brasileiro Série A club Atlético Mineiro on a four-year contract.

== International career ==
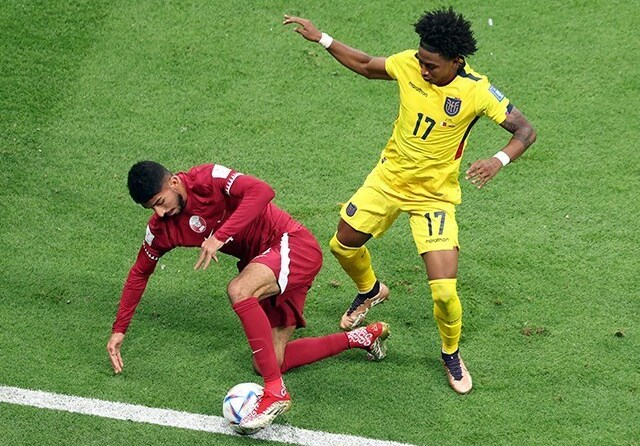
Preciado playing against Qatar at the 2022 FIFA World Cup

On 4 May 2017, Preciado was called up to Ecuador under-20s for the year's FIFA U-20 World Cup, On 30 August of the following year, he was called up to the full side by manager Hernán Darío Gómez, for two friendlies against Jamaica and Guatemala.

Preciado made his full international debut on 12 October 2018, replacing Independiente teammate Stiven Plaza in a 4–3 loss against Qatar at the Jassim bin Hamad Stadium in Doha.

Preciado was selected in the 28 player Ecuador squad for the 2021 Copa América.

Preciado was named in the Ecuadorian squad for the 2022 FIFA World Cup.

Preciado was called up to the final 26-man Ecuador squad for the 2024 Copa América.

On 31 May 2026, Preciado was selected in the 26-man squad for the 2026 FIFA World Cup.

== Career statistics ==
=== Club ===
As of match played 29 August 2026

Appearances and goals by club, season and competition
Club	Season	League			State League		Cup		Continental		Other		Total	
Club	Season	Division	Apps	Goals	Apps	Goals	Apps	Goals	Apps	Goals	Apps	Goals	Apps	Goals
Independiente Juniors	2018	Segunda Categoría	0	0	—		—		—		11 (Note: Appearance(s) in Campeonato Provincial de Segunda Categoría de Cotopaxi)	2	11	2
Independiente del Valle	2018	LigaPro Serie A	24	2	—		—		—		—		24	2
Independiente del Valle	2019	LigaPro Serie A	20	1	—		—		8 (Note: Appearance(s) in Copa Sudamericana)	0	—		28	1
Independiente del Valle	2020	LigaPro Serie A	21	3	—		—		7 (Note: Appearance(s) in Copa Libertadores)	1	2 (Note: Appearance(s) in Recopa Sudamericana)	0	30	4
Independiente del Valle	Total		65	6	—		15	1	2	0	82	7		
Genk	2020–21	Belgian Pro League	10	0	—		0	0	—		—		10	0
Genk	2021–22	Belgian Pro League	23	0	—		2	0	5 (Note: Appearance(s) in UEFA Europa League)	0	1 (Note: Appearance in Belgian Super Cup)	0	31	0
Genk	2022–23	Belgian Pro League	24	0	—		3	0	—		—		27	0
Genk	2023–24	Belgian Pro League	2	0	—		0	0	0	0	—		2	0
Genk	Total		59	0	—		5	0	5	0	1	0	70	0
Sparta Prague	2023–24	Czech First League	13	1	—		3	0	10	2	—		26	3
Sparta Prague	2024–25	Czech First League	10	0	—		1	0	7 (Note: Appearance(s) in UEFA Champions League)	0	—		18	0
Sparta Prague	2025–26	Czech First League	14	0	—		0	0	9 (Note: Appearance(s) in UEFA Conference League)	1	—		23	1
Sparta Prague	Total		37	1	4	0	26	3	—		67	4		
Atlético Mineiro	2026	Série A	11	0	6	0	3	0	3 (Note: Appearances in Copa Sudamericana)	0	—		23	0
Career total			172	7	6	0	12	0	49	4	14	2	253	13

=== International ===
As of match played 5 October 2026

Appearances and goals by national team and year
National team	Year	Apps	Goals
Ecuador	2018	2	0
Ecuador	2019	1	0
Ecuador	2020	4	0
Ecuador	2021	10	0
Ecuador	2022	10	0
Ecuador	2023	8	0
Ecuador	2024	10	0
Ecuador	2025	6	0
Ecuador	2026	10	0
Total		61	0

== Honours ==
Independiente del Valle

- Copa Sudamericana: 2019

Genk

- Belgian Cup: 2020–21

Sparta Prague

- Czech First League: 2023–24
- Czech Cup: 2023–24
