= Martin Vitík =

Czech footballer (born 2003)

Personal information
- Date of birth: 21 January 2003 (age 23)
- Place of birth: Beroun, Czech Republic
- Height: 1.93 m (6 ft 4 in)
- Position: Defender

Team information
- Current team: Bologna
- Number: 41

Youth career
- Králův Dvůr
- Tempo Prague
- 2017–2020: Sparta Prague

Senior career*
Years	Team	Apps	(Gls)
2020–2025	Sparta Prague	109	(10)
2021–2022	→ Sparta Prague B	15	(3)
2025–	Bologna	19	(0)

International career^{‡}
2018	Czech Republic U15	7	(1)
2018–2019	Czech Republic U16	15	(0)
2019–2020	Czech Republic U17	11	(2)
2021–	Czech Republic U21	17	(2)
2023–	Czech Republic	11	(0)
- * Club domestic league appearances and goals as of 25 April 2026 ‡ National team caps and goals as of 8 October 2026

Martin Vitík (born 21 January 2003) is a Czech professional footballer who plays as a defender for Serie A club Bologna and the Czech Republic national team.

== Life ==
Vitík was born in Beroun.

== Club career ==
Vitík is a youth product of Králův Dvůr, Tempo Prague, and Sparta Prague. He made his debut with the latter club in a 4–1 UEFA Europa League loss to Lille on 22 October 2020. On 23 March 2021, he signed his first professional contract with Sparta Prague until 2024. On 6 July 2025, Vitík signed a contract with Italian club Bologna until 2029.

== International career ==
A youth international for the Czech Republic, Vitík was called up to represent the Czech Republic U21 for the 2021 European Under-21 Championship. He debuted for the Czech senior team on 20 November 2023 in a UEFA Euro 2024 qualifying Group E match against Moldova.

== Career statistics ==
=== Club ===
As of match played 25 April 2026

Appearances and goals by club, season and competition
Club	Season	League			National cup		Europe		Other		Total	
Club	Season	Division	Apps	Goals	Apps	Goals	Apps	Goals	Apps	Goals	Apps	Goals
Sparta Prague	2020–21	Czech First League	17	0	2	0	2 (Note: Appearances in UEFA Europa League)	0	—		21	0
Sparta Prague	2021–22	Czech First League	17	2	4	0	2 (Note: Appearances in UEFA Europa Conference League)	0	—		23	2
Sparta Prague	2022–23	Czech First League	22	0	5	2	—		—		27	2
Sparta Prague	2023–24	Czech First League	27	4	3	0	11 (Note: Nine appearances and one goal in UEFA Europa League, two appearances in UEFA Champions League)	1	—		41	5
Sparta Prague	2024–25	Czech First League	26	4	3	0	13 (Note: Appearances in UEFA Champions League)	0	—		42	4
Sparta Prague	Total		109	10	17	2	28	1	0	0	154	13
Bologna	2025–26	Serie A	19	0	1	0	10	0	0	0	30	0
Career total			128	10	18	2	38	1	0	0	184	13

=== International ===
As of match played 6 October 2026

Appearances and goals by national team and year
National team	Year	Apps	Goals
Czech Republic	2023	1	0
Czech Republic	2024	4	0
Czech Republic	2025	4	0
Czech Republic	2026	2	0
Total		11	0

== Honours ==
Sparta Prague

- Czech First League: 2022–23, 2023–24
- Czech Cup: 2023–24
