= Jaroslav Zelený =

Czech footballer (born 1992)

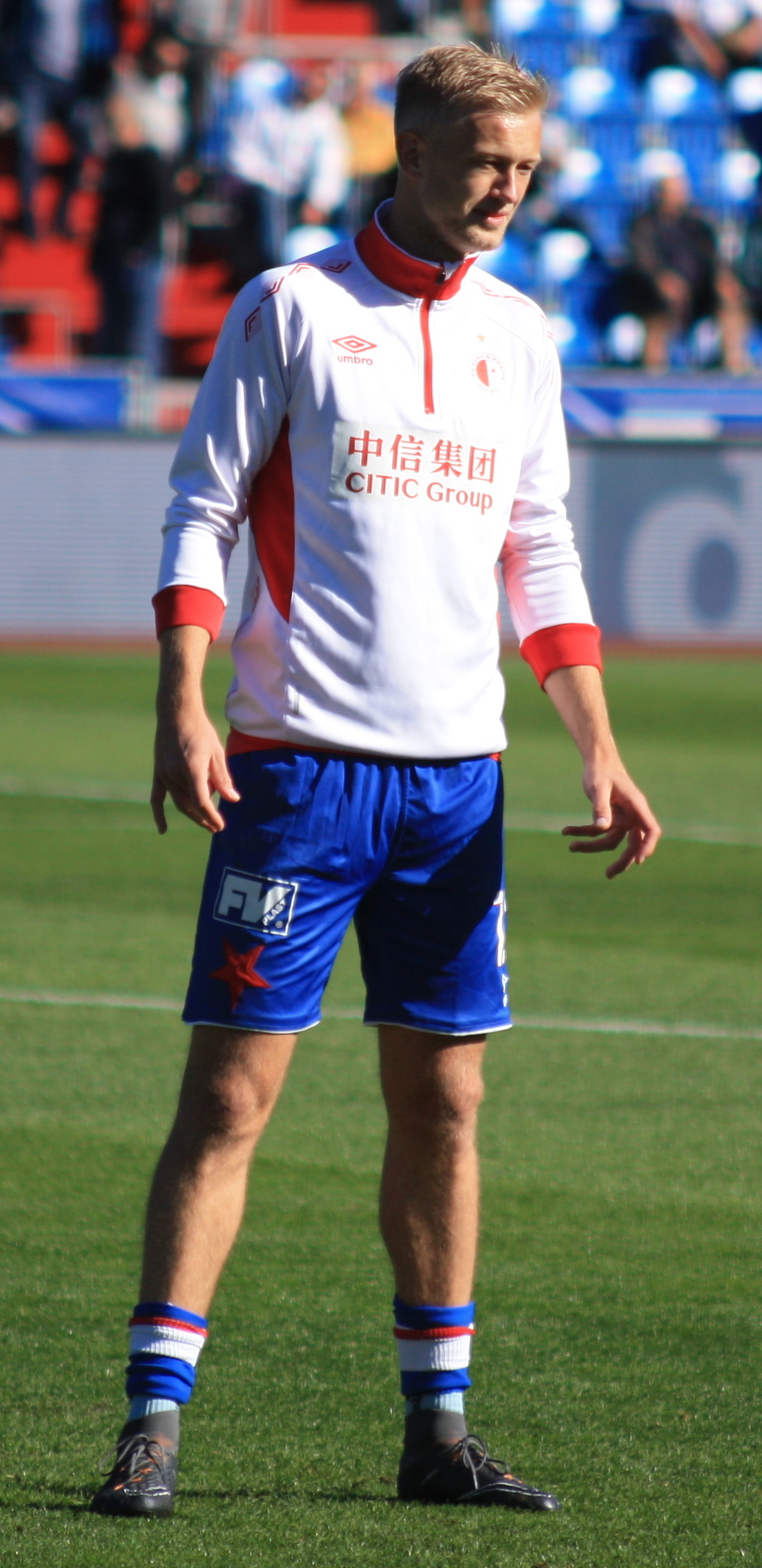
- Zelený in 2018

Personal information
- Date of birth: 20 August 1992 (age 34)
- Place of birth: Hradec Králové, Czechoslovakia
- Height: 1.90 m (6 ft 3 in)
- Positions: Left-back; centre-back

Team information
- Current team: Sparta Prague
- Number: 30

Youth career
- Hradec Králové

Senior career*
Years	Team	Apps	(Gls)
2010–2014	Hradec Králové	78	(5)
2014–2015	→ Karviná (loan)	17	(0)
2015–2017	Karviná	28	(1)
2017–2018	Jablonec	41	(1)
2018–2021	Slavia Prague	20	(0)
2020	→ Mladá Boleslav (loan)	13	(1)
2020–2021	→ Jablonec (loan)	32	(3)
2021–2022	Jablonec	33	(1)
2022–	Sparta Prague	112	(5)

International career^{‡}
2008	Czech Republic U17	1	(0)
2010	Czech Republic U18	1	(0)
2020–2026	Czech Republic	25	(0)
- * Club domestic league appearances and goals as of 25 May 2026 ‡ National team caps and goals as of 18 June 2026

Jaroslav Zelený (born 20 August 1992) is a Czech professional footballer who plays as a left-back or centre-back for Sparta Prague.

== Club career ==
In January 2017, Zelený transferred from MFK Karviná to FK Jablonec.

In June 2021, Zelený signed with Jablonec.

On 3 June 2022, Zelený signed a contract with Sparta Prague.

== International career ==
On 6 September 2020, Zelený received his first invitation to the Czech Republic national team for the 2020–21 UEFA Nations League match against Scotland.

On 31 May 2026, Zelený was announced as part of the Czech squad for the 2026 FIFA World Cup.

== Career statistics ==
=== Club ===
As of match played 24 May 2026

Appearances and goals by club, season and competition
Club	Season	League			Cup		Continental		Other		Total	
Club	Season	Division	Apps	Goals	Apps	Goals	Apps	Goals	Apps	Goals	Apps	Goals
Hradec Králové	2009–10	Czech National Football League	2	0	0	0	—		—		2	0
Hradec Králové	2010–11	Czech First League	6	1	0	0	—		—		6	1
Hradec Králové	2011–12	Czech First League	28	2	0	0	—		—		28	2
Hradec Králové	2012–13	Czech First League	14	0	0	0	—		—		14	0
Hradec Králové	2013–14	Czech National Football League	28	2	1	0	—		—		29	2
Hradec Králové	Total		78	5	1	0	—		—		79	5
Karviná (loan)	2014–15	Czech National Football League	17	0	1	0	—		—		18	0
Karviná	2015–16	Czech National Football League	12	0	2	0	—		—		14	0
Karviná	2016–17	Fortuna liga	16	1	0	0	—		—		16	1
Karviná	Total		28	1	2	0	—		—		30	1
Jablonec	2016–17	Czech First League	15	0	0	0	—		—		15	0
Jablonec	2017–18	Czech First League	26	1	6	0	—		—		32	1
Jablonec	Total		41	1	6	0	—		—		47	1
Slavia Prague	2018–19	Czech First League	13	0	3	0	1	0	—		17	0
Slavia Prague	2019–20	Czech First League	7	0	2	1	4	0	0	0	13	1
Slavia Prague	Total		20	0	5	1	5	0	0	0	30	1
Mladá Boleslav (loan)	2019–20	Czech First League	13	1	1	0	—		—		14	1
Jablonec (loan)	2020–21	Czech First League	32	3	2	0	1	1	—		35	4
Jablonec	2021–22	Czech First League	33	1	4	0	10	0	—		47	1
Sparta Prague	2022–23	Czech First League	34	1	5	1	2	1	—		42	3
Sparta Prague	2023–24	Czech First League	22	1	5	0	11	0	—		38	1
Sparta Prague	2024–25	Czech First League	29	2	4	1	9	0	—		42	3
Sparta Prague	2025–26	Czech First League	25	1	1	0	10	0	—		36	1
Sparta Prague	Total		112	5	15	2	32	1	—		158	8
Career total			372	17	37	3	48	2	0	0	458	22

=== International ===
As of 18 June 2026

Appearances and goals by national team and year
National team	Year	Apps	Goals
Czech Republic	2020	1	0
Czech Republic	2021	0	0
Czech Republic	2022	5	0
Czech Republic	2023	3	0
Czech Republic	2024	3	0
Czech Republic	2025	8	0
Czech Republic	2026	5	0
Total		25	0

== Honours ==
Sparta Prague

- Czech First League: 2022–23, 2023–24
- Czech Cup: 2023–24
