= Tomáš Wiesner =

Czech footballer (born 1997)

Personal information
- Date of birth: 17 July 1997 (age 29)
- Place of birth: Prague, Czech Republic
- Height: 1.75 m (5 ft 9 in)
- Position: Defender

Team information
- Current team: Hradec Králové

Youth career
- 2003–2006: SK GORDIC Praha Kačerov
- 2006–2016: Sparta Prague

Senior career*
Years	Team	Apps	(Gls)
2016–2025	Sparta Prague	129	(13)
2016–2017	→ Vlašim (loan)	29	(1)
2018	→ Slovan Liberec (loan)	7	(0)
2019–2020	→ Mladá Boleslav (loan)	11	(0)
2025–2026	Houston Dynamo	2	(1)
2026–	Hradec Králové	0	(0)

International career^{‡}
2014–2015	Czech Republic U-18	8	(1)
2015	Czech Republic U-19	3	(0)
2017	Czech Republic U-20	2	(0)
2017–2018	Czech Republic U-21	7	(0)
2021–	Czech Republic	1	(0)
- * Club domestic league appearances and goals as of 17 June 2025 ‡ National team caps and goals as of 5 September 2021

Tomáš Wiesner (born 17 July 1997) is a Czech professional footballer who plays as a defender for Czech First League club Hradec Králové.

== Career ==
On 17 July 2025, Wiesner signed a contract with Major League Soccer club Houston Dynamo.

On 22 June 2026, Wiesner signed a multi-year contract with Czech First League club Hradec Králové.

Wiesner received his first Czech Republic national football team call-up in August 2021 due to numerous absences of regular footballers. The same year on 5 September, he debuted the same year on 5 September in an away 2022 World Cup qualification against Belgium, coming on as a substitute for Adam Hložek in the 77th minute – ending in a 0–3 loss for the Czechs.

== Career statistics ==
=== Club ===
As of match played 15 March 2025

Appearances and goals by club, season and competition
Club	Season	League			Cup		Continental		Other		Total	
Club	Season	Division	Apps	Goals	Apps	Goals	Apps	Goals	Apps	Goals	Apps	Goals
Sparta Prague	2015–16	Czech First League	0	0	1	0	—		—		1	0
Sparta Prague	2018–19	Czech First League	5	0	2	0	—		—		7	0
Sparta Prague	2020–21	Czech First League	14	4	3	0	1	0	—		18	4
Sparta Prague	2021–22	Czech First League	33	2	3	0	11	0	—		47	2
Sparta Prague	2022–23	Czech First League	28	3	2	0	2	0	—		32	3
Sparta Prague	2023–24	Czech First League	28	3	2	0	9	0	—		39	3
Sparta Prague	2024–25	Czech First League	20	1	1	0	13	1	—		34	2
Sparta Prague	Total		128	13	14	0	36	1	0	0	178	14
Vlašim (loan)	2016–17	Czech National League	15	0	1	0	—		—		16	0
Vlašim (loan)	2017–18	Czech National League	14	1	4	0	—		—		18	1
Vlašim (loan)	Total		29	1	5	0	—		—		34	1
Slovan Liberec (loan)	2017–18	Czech First League	7	0	—		—		—		7	0
Mladá Boleslav (loan)	2018–19	Czech First League	9	0	—		—		—		9	0
Mladá Boleslav (loan)	2019–20	Czech First League	2	0	—		—		—		2	0
Mladá Boleslav (loan)	Total		11	0	—		—		—		11	0
Sparta Prague B	2022–23	Czech National Football League	1	0	—		—		—		1	0
Career total			176	14	19	0	36	1	0	0	231	15

== Honours ==
Sparta Prague

- Czech First League: 2022–23, 2023–24
- Czech Cup: 2023–24
