= Markus Solbakken =

Norwegian footballer (born 2000)

Personal information
- Date of birth: 25 July 2000 (age 26)
- Place of birth: Hamar, Norway
- Height: 1.82 m (6 ft 0 in)
- Position: Midfielder

Team information
- Current team: AGF
- Number: 7

Youth career
- –2015: HamKam

Senior career*
Years	Team	Apps	(Gls)
2016–2020	HamKam	110	(3)
2021–2022	Stabæk	26	(1)
2022–2024	Viking	54	(3)
2024–2025	Sparta Prague	25	(1)
2025	→ Pisa (loan)	7	(0)
2025–	AGF	11	(2)

International career^{‡}
2016	Norway U16	4	(0)
2017	Norway U17	2	(0)
2018	Norway U18	13	(0)
2019	Norway U19	7	(2)
2018–2023	Norway U21	8	(0)
2023	Norway	1	(0)
- * Club domestic league appearances and goals as of 10 December 2025 ‡ National team caps and goals as of 29 August 2024

Markus Solbakken (born 25 July 2000) is a Norwegian professional footballer who plays as a midfielder for Danish Superliga club AGF.

== Club career ==
He is a son of Ståle Solbakken. While his father was a football player and later manager, mostly abroad, the family settled in Hamar and Solbakken came through the youth ranks of Hamarkameratene. He made his senior debut in 2016 and was a prolific Norway youth international, making his debut for Norway U21 at the age of 18. In the 2020 1. divisjon he passed the mark of 100 league games for Hamkam.

Ahead of the 2021 season he was bought by Stabæk. He made his Eliteserien debut in May 2021 against Haugesund. After Stabæk were relegated, Solbakken transferred to Viking in February 2022. He signed a four-year contract with the club.

On 9 January 2024, Solbakken signed a multi-year contract with Czech First League club Sparta Prague.

On 22 January 2025, Solbakken joined Serie B club Pisa on a half-year loan deal with option to make transfer permanent.

On 1 September 2025, Solbakken signed a three-year contract with Danish Superliga club AGF. On 28 September 2025, Solbakken scored his first goal as a game winner against FC Nordsjaelland in a 2–1 away win for AGF. In his first season, he won the Danish Championship with the club, the first in 40 years.

== International career ==
In August 2023, Solbakken received his first call-up to the Norway senior national team by his father and head coach Ståle Solbakken, for a friendly match against Jordan and a UEFA Euro 2024 qualifying match against Georgia. He debuted during the former match on 12 September, coming on as a substitute in the 61st minute.

== Personal life ==
He is a son of Ståle Solbakken. In May 2026, after spending months out on the sideline at his club AGF, he shared news about his injury. He was diagnosed with visual disturbances in one eye earlier in the season due to an inflamed optic nerve, which made it impossible for him to play football. He had also been diagnosed with multiple sclerosis.

== Career statistics ==
=== Club ===
As of match played 28 September 2025

Appearances and goals by club, season and competition
Club	Season	League			National cup (Note: Includes Norwegian Cup, Czech Cup, Danish Cup)		Europe		Total	
Club	Season	Division	Apps	Goals	Apps	Goals	Apps	Goals	Apps	Goals
HamKam	2016	2. divisjon	9	0	0	0	—		9	0
HamKam	2017	2. divisjon	23	0	1	0	—		24	0
HamKam	2018	1. divisjon	25	0	3	0	—		28	0
HamKam	2019	1. divisjon	27	1	2	0	—		29	1
HamKam	2020	1. divisjon	26	2	—		—		26	2
HamKam	Total		110	3	6	0	—		116	3
Stabæk	2021	Eliteserien	26	1	2	0	—		28	1
Viking	2022	Eliteserien	27	1	5	0	6 (Note: Appearances in UEFA Europa Conference League)	0	38	1
Viking	2023	Eliteserien	27	2	3	0	—		30	2
Viking	Total		54	3	8	0	6	0	68	3
Sparta Prague	2023–24	Czech First League	12	0	3	0	3 (Note: Appearances in UEFA Europa League)	0	18	0
Sparta Prague	2024–25	Czech First League	13	1	1	0	7 (Note: Appearances in UEFA Champions League)	0	21	1
Sparta Prague	Total		25	1	4	0	10	0	39	1
Pisa (loan)	2024–25	Serie B	7	0	—		—		7	0
AGF	2025–26	Danish Superliga	3	1	1	0	—		4	1
Career total			225	9	21	0	16	0	262	9

=== International ===
Appearances and goals by national team and year
National team	Year	Apps	Goals
Norway	2023	1	0
Total		1	0

== Honours ==
Sparta Prague

- Czech First League: 2023–24
- Czech Cup: 2023–24

AGF

- Danish Superliga: 2025–26
