= 2024–25 AC Sparta Prague season =

AC Sparta Prague
2024–25 season
- Manager: Lars Friis
- Stadium: Stadion Letná
- Czech First League: 4th
- Czech Cup: Quarter-finals
- UEFA Champions League: League phase
- Top goalscorer: League: Lukáš Haraslín (10 goals); All: Lukáš Haraslín (12 goals)
- Highest home attendance: 18,207
- Average home league attendance: 15,865
Home colours	Away colours

The 2024–25 season is the 131st season in the history of AC Sparta Prague, and the club's 32nd consecutive season in Czech First League. In addition to the domestic league, the team is participating in the Czech Cup and the UEFA Champions League.

== Transfers ==
=== In ===
Pos.	Player	Transferred from	Fee	Date	Source
DF	(Slovakia) Jakub Uhrinčať	(Slovakia) Dukla Banská Bystrica	Undisclosed	1 July 2024	
MF	(Kosovo) Ermal Krasniqi	(Romania) FC Rapid București	€2,000,000	1 July 2024	
GK	(Denmark) Peter Vindahl Jensen	(Netherlands) AZ Alkmaar	€1,500,000	1 July 2024	
MF	(Serbia) Veljko Birmančević	(France) Toulouse FC	€3,300,000	1 July 2024	
DF	(Denmark) Mathias Ross	(Turkey) Galatasaray	Loan	16 July 2024	
DF	(Spain) Imanol García de Albéniz	(Spain) Athletic Bilbao	Undisclosed	16 July 2024	

=== Out ===
Pos.	Player	Transferred to	Fee	Date	Source
DF	(Czech Republic) Ladislav Krejčí	(Spain) Girona	€12,000,000	1 July 2024	
MF	(Czech Republic) Michal Ševčík	(Germany) 1. FC Nürnberg	Loan	1 July 2024	
FW	(Czech Republic) Václav Sejk	(Poland) Zagłębie Lubin	Loan	3 July 2024	
MF	(Czech Republic) Adam Karabec	(Germany) Hamburger SV	Loan	4 July 2024	
DF	(Czech Republic) Patrik Vydra	(Czech Republic) Mladá Boleslav	Loan	9 July 2024	
FW	(Czech Republic) Václav Sejk	(Portugal) Famalicão	Undisclosed	8 January 2025	

Notes

1. ^{†} Loan transfer made permanent

== Friendlies ==
=== Pre-season ===
29 June 2024 Friendly	Sparta Prague (Czech Republic)	3–1	(Sweden) AIK	Prague
15:00	Tuci 27'; Kúdela 48'; Mejdr 80'; Solbakken (yellow card) 89'	Report	Nordfeldt (yellow card) 69'; Guidetti 85'	Stadium: Stadion Letná; Attendance: 5,121

5 July 2024 Friendly	Sparta Prague (Czech Republic)	3–0	(Slovakia) Spartak Trnava	Prague
15:00	Wiesner 62'; Olatunji 80'; Schánělec 89'	Report		Stadium: Stadion Letná; Attendance: 5,938

10 July 2024 Friendly	Brøndby IF (Denmark)	5–2	(Czech Republic) Sparta Prague	Kössen, Austria
16:00	Vallys 6', 44'; Lauritsen 22'; Bundgaard 27'; Suzuki 75'	Report	Schánělec 68'; Sadílek 69'	Stadium: Kaiserwinkl Arena

13 July 2024 Friendly	Red Bull Salzburg (Austria)	2–2	(Czech Republic) Sparta Prague	St. Johann in Tirol, Austria
18:00	Gloukh 7'; Nene 25'	Report	Daněk 15'; Olatunji 80'	Stadium: Koasastadion St. Johann

=== Mid-season ===
10 January 2025 Friendly	Sparta Prague (Czech Republic)	3–1	(Sweden) Malmö FF
15:30

== Competitions ==
=== Overall record ===
Competition	First match	Last match	Starting round	Record							
Competition	First match	Last match	Starting round	Pld	W	D	L	GF	GA	GD	Win %
Czech First League	19 July 2024	19 April 2025	Matchday 1	1	1	0	0	2	1	+1	100.00
Czech Cup				0	0	0	0	0	0	+0	—
UEFA Champions League	23 July 2024		Second qualifying round	6	5	1	0	14	5	+9	83.33
Total				7	6	1	0	16	6	+10	85.71

Last updated: 23 July 2024
Source: Soccerway

=== Czech First League ===
==== Regular season ====
Pos	Team	Pld	W	D	L	GF	GA	GD	Pts	Qualification or relegation
2	Viktoria Plzeň	30	20	5	5	59	28	+31	65	Qualification for the championship group
3	Baník Ostrava	30	20	4	6	52	26	+26	64	Qualification for the championship group
4	Sparta Prague	30	19	5	6	56	33	+23	62	Qualification for the championship group
5	Jablonec	30	15	6	9	47	25	+22	51	Qualification for the championship group
6	Sigma Olomouc	30	12	7	11	46	41	+5	43	Qualification for the championship group

Source: Chance Liga
Rules for classification: 1) Points; 2) Head-to-head points; 3) Head-to-head goal difference; 4) Head-to-head goals scored; 5) Goal difference; 6) Goals scored; 7) Fair-play ranking; 8) Draw.

==== Results summary ====
Overall								Home						Away					
Pld	W	D	L	GF	GA	GD	Pts	W	D	L	GF	GA	GD	W	D	L	GF	GA	GD
1	1	0	0	2	1	+1	3	1	0	0	2	1	+1	0	0	0	0	0	0

Last updated: 19 July 2024.
Source: Chance Liga

==== Results by round ====
Round	1
Ground	H
Result	W
Position	

Updated to match(es) played on 19 July 2024. Source: Chance Liga
A = Away; H = Home; W = Win; D = Draw; L = Loss

==== Matches ====
The match schedule was released on 20 June 2024.

19 July 2024 1	Sparta Prague	2–1	Pardubice	Prague
19:00	Ryneš 45+3'; Olatunji 59'		Kalabiška 25'	Stadium: Stadion Letná; Referee: Jan Všetečka

27 July 2024 2	Teplice	1–4	Sparta Prague	Teplice
17:00 CEST	Pavel Svatek (yellow card) 35'; Jaroslav Harušťák 60'	Report	Birmančević (yellow card) 24'; Vitík 47'; Haraslín (yellow card) 57' (goal) 61'; Preciado (yellow card) 70'; Olatunji 90+1'; Krasniqi 90+5'	Stadium: Na Stínadlech; Attendance: 15,946; Referee: (Czech Republic) Dominik Starý

2 August 2024 3	Sparta Prague	2–0	Dukla Prague	Prague
20:00 CEST	Vitík 38'; Kairinen (yellow card) 45'; Birmančević 81' (pen.)	Report	Šebrle (yellow card) 52'; Rada (yellow card) 87'	Stadium: epet Arena; Attendance: 16,826; Referee: (Czech Republic) Daniel Vokoun

10 August 2024 4	Bohemians 1905	1–2	Sparta Prague	Prague
17:00 CEST	Abdulla Yusuf Helal 40'; Hůlka (yellow card) 74'	Report	Tuci 45+4'; Ross (yellow card) 50'; Birmančević 62'	Stadium: Ďolíček; Attendance: 5,783; Referee: (Czech Republic) Karel Rouček

17 August 2024 5	Jablonec	1–2	Sparta Prague	Jablonec nad Nisou
20:00 CEST	Tekijaški (yellow card) 40'; Hollý (yellow card) 74'; Martinec 88'	Report	Haraslín 38'; Tuci 68'; Wiesner (yellow card) 74'	Stadium: Stadion Střelnice; Attendance: 5,500; Referee: (Czech Republic) Jan Machálek

24 August 2024 6	Sparta Prague	2–2	1. FC Slovácko	Prague
17:00 CEST	Sørensen 20'; Birmančević 79' (pen.)	Report	Sinyavskiy 17'; Krmenčík 24'; Gigli Ndefe (yellow card) 32'; Hofmann (yellow card) 45+4'; Doski (yellow card) 45+5'; Blahút (yellow card) 83'; Daníček (yellow card) 90+3'	Stadium: epet Arena; Attendance: 16,723; Referee: (Czech Republic) Pavel Orel

31 August 2024 7	Hradec Králové	0–2	Sparta Prague	Hradec Králové
20:00 CEST	Samek (yellow card) 15'	Report	Haraslín 8'; Kairinen (yellow card) 17'; Rrahmani 45'; Ryneš (yellow card) 61'; Krasniqi (yellow card) 64'	Stadium: Malšovická aréna Attendance: 9,300; Referee: (Czech Republic) Karel Rouček

22 September 2024 9	České Budějovice	0–2	Sparta Prague	České Budějovice
15:30 CEST	Ekpai (red card) 40'; Jakob Tranziska (yellow card) 76'	Report	Vitík 11'; Krasniqi 52'	Stadium: Stadion Střelecký ostrov Attendance: 6,681; Referee: (Czech Republic) Dominik Starý

27 September 2024 10	Sparta Prague	2–3	Sigma Olomouc	Prague
19:30 CEST	Olatunji 12'; Laçi (yellow card) 53'; Haraslín (yellow card) 82'; Krasniqi 90+1'	Report	Yunusa Muritala (yellow card) 39' (goal) 67'; Jan Fiala 78'; Jáchym Šíp (yellow card) 80' (yellow-red card) 89'; Zorvan 86'; Jiří Sláma (yellow card) 86'; Janotka (yellow card) 89'; Tadeáš Stoppen (yellow card) 90+7'	Stadium: epet Arena; Attendance: 16,538; Referee: (Czech Republic) Ondřej Berka

6 October 2024 11	Slavia Prague	2–1	Sparta Prague	Prague
18:30 CET	Chytil 2'; Zafeiris 22'; Douděra (yellow card) 52'; Chorý (yellow card) 60'; Diouf (yellow card) 72'; Wallem (yellow card) 86'; Provod (yellow card) 89'; Zmrzlý (yellow card) 90+1'; Bořil (yellow card) 90+4'; Dorley (red card) 90+8'	Report	Ryneš (yellow card) 19'; Vitík (yellow card) 60' (yellow-red card) 90+3'; Rrahmani 65' (yellow card) 90+8'; Kairinen (yellow card) 71'; Preciado (yellow card) 87'; Solbakken (yellow card) 89'; Vindahl (yellow card) 90+4'	Stadium: Fortuna Arena; Attendance: 19,308; Referee: (Czech Republic) Ladislav Szikszay

19 October 2024 12	Sparta Prague	2–1	Slovan Liberec	Prague
19:00 CET	Wiesner 8'; Haraslín 79'; Birmančević (yellow card) 87'; Olatunji (yellow card) 90+3'; Friis (yellow card) 90+4'	Report	Višinský (yellow card) 43'; Pourzitidis 63' (yellow card) 84'; Zyba (yellow card) 77'; Preisler (yellow card) 90+5'	Stadium: epet Arena; Attendance: 16,746; Referee: (Czech Republic) Dominik Starý

27 October 2024 13	Viktoria Plzeň	1–0	Sparta Prague	Plzeň
18:30 CET	Adu 30'; Jemelka (yellow card) 88'; Šulc (yellow card) 90+6'	Report	Kairinen (yellow card) 46'; Wiesner (yellow card) 73'; Suchomel (yellow card) 90+3'	Stadium: Doosan Arena; Attendance: 11,620; Referee: (Czech Republic) Karel Rouček

2 November 2024 14	Sparta Prague	1–3	Baník Ostrava	Prague
19:00 CET	Sørensen 12'; Panák (yellow card) 76'; Rrahmani (yellow card) 88'; Olatunji (yellow card) 89'; Ryneš (yellow card) 90+8'	Report	Ewerton 22' (pen.) 86' (pen.); Prekop 45+1'	Stadium: epet Arena; Attendance: 17,610; Referee: (Czech Republic) Dalibor Černý

10 November 2024 15	Mladá Boleslav	2–2	Sparta Prague	Mladá Boleslav
15:30 CET	Stránský (yellow card) 20'; Vojta 39'; Králik 82'; Matějovský (yellow card) 85'	Report	Olatunji 9'; Wiesner (yellow card) 41'; Daněk (yellow card) 45+1'; Cobbaut 59'	Stadium: Lokotrans Aréna; Attendance: 4,868; Referee: (Czech Republic) Jan Všetečka

23 November 2024 16	Sparta Prague	1–1	Teplice	Prague
16:00 CET	Sadílek (yellow card) 14'; Haraslín 56' (yellow card) 59'; Krasniqi (yellow card) 84'	Report	Ondřej Kričfaluši (yellow card) 28'; Yasser (yellow card) 58'; Jan Knapík 61'; Albert Labík (yellow card) 68'; Jakub Hora (yellow card) 90+5'	Stadium: epet Arena; Attendance: 15,879; Referee: (Czech Republic) Jan Beneš

30 November 2024 17	Dukla Prague	1–1	Sparta Prague	Prague
19:00 CET	Vondrášek 90+4'	Report	Olatunji 11'	Stadium: Stadion Juliska; Attendance: 6,992; Referee: (Czech Republic) Karel Rouček

3 December 2024 8	Sparta Prague	4–1	Karviná	Prague
19:00 CET	Sadílek 2'; Laçi 39'; Rrahmani 45'; Birmančević 88'	Report	Vecheta (yellow card) 33'; Regáli 36'; Vallo (yellow card) 90+3'	Stadium: epet Arena; Attendance: 10,788; Referee: (Czech Republic) Lukáš Nehasil

7 December 2024 18	Sparta Prague	1–0	Bohemians 1905	Prague
19:00 CET	Vitík (yellow card) 70'; Solbakken 74'	Report	Hrubý (yellow card) 30'; Jan Vondra (yellow card) 67'	Stadium: epet Arena; Attendance: 14,777; Referee: (Czech Republic) Jan Všetečka

15 December 2024 19	Sparta Prague	2–1	Jablonec	Prague
13:00 CET	Rrahmani (yellow card) 39' (goal) 51'; Suchomel (yellow card) 55'; Olatunji 78'	Report	Hollý 34'	Stadium: epet Arena; Attendance: 15,963; Referee: (Czech Republic) Lukáš Nehasil

2 February 2025 20	Slovácko	0–2	Sparta Prague	Uherské Hradiště
13:00 CET	Trávník (yellow card) 26'; Robert Mišković (yellow card) 63'	Report	Sadílek 4'; Kuchta 30'; Sørensen (yellow card) 68'	Stadium: Městský fotbalový stadion Miroslava Valenty; Attendance: 8,000; Referee: (Czech Republic) Jan Všetečka

==== Championship round ====
Pos	Team	Pld	W	D	L	GF	GA	GD	Pts	Qualification or relegation
1	Slavia Prague (C)	35	29	3	3	77	18	+59	90	Qualification for the Champions League league phase
2	Viktoria Plzeň	35	23	5	7	71	36	+35	74	Qualification for the Champions League second qualifying round
3	Baník Ostrava	35	22	5	8	58	34	+24	71	Qualification for the Europa League second qualifying round
4	Sparta Prague	35	19	6	10	61	44	+17	63	Qualification for the Conference League second qualifying round
5	Jablonec	35	19	6	10	60	33	+27	63	
6	Sigma Olomouc	35	12	9	14	48	53	−5	45	Qualification for the Europa League play-off round (Note: The winner of the 2024–25 Czech Cup (Sigma Olomouc) qualifies for the Europa League play-off round.)

Source: Chance Liga
Rules for classification: 1) Total points; 2) Points earned in regular season; 3) Head-to-head points (regular season); 4) Head-to-head goal difference (regular season); 5) Head-to-head goals scored (regular season); 5) Goal difference (all matches); 6) Goals scored (all matches); 7) Fair-play ranking; 8) Draw.
(C) Champions

=== Czech Cup ===
30 October 2024 Third Round	Sparta Prague	4–0	Zbrojovka Brno	Prague
19:15 CET	Krasniqi 40'; Pešek 65'; Daněk 71'; Rrahmani 80' (pen.)	Report		Stadium: epet Arena; Attendance: 13,649; Referee: (Czech Republic) Pavel Orel

=== UEFA Champions League ===
As the Czech First League champions, Sparta entered the competition in the second qualifying round.

Win Draw Loss Fixtures

==== Second qualifying round ====
The second qualifying round draw was held on 19 June 2024, Sparta were drawn against League of Ireland Premier Division champions Shamrock Rovers.

23 July 2024 First leg	Shamrock Rovers (Republic of Ireland)	0–2	(Czech Republic) Sparta Prague	Dublin, Republic of Ireland
19:00 IST	Burns (yellow card) 79'	Report	Birmančević 38'; Solbakken (yellow card) 58'; Wiesner 65'	Stadium: Tallaght Stadium; Attendance: 9,684; Referee: Joey Kooij (Netherlands)

30 July 2024 Second leg	Sparta Prague (Czech Republic)	4–2 (6–2 agg.)	(Republic of Ireland) Shamrock Rovers	Prague, Czech Republic
19:00 CEST	Sadílek (yellow card) 2'; Laçi (yellow card) 18'; Olatunji 29'; Ross 41'; Sørensen 48'; Daněk (yellow card) 62'; Tuci 71'	Report	Cleary (yellow card) 26'; Greene 32', 47'; Nugent (yellow card) 38'	Stadium: Stadion Letná; Attendance: 17,367; Referee: Simone Sozza (Italy)

==== Third qualifying round ====
The third qualifying round draw was held on 22 July 2024, Sparta were drawn against Liga I champions FCSB.

6 August 2024 First leg	Sparta Prague (Czech Republic)	1–1	(Romania) FCSB	Prague, Czech Republic
20:00 CEST	Vitík (yellow card) 65'; Olatunji 78'; Krasniqi (yellow card) 84'	Report	Crețu (yellow card) 41'; Târnovanu (yellow card) 43'; Popa (yellow card) 43'; Dawa (yellow card) 55', (goal) 61'; Phelipe (yellow card) 90+4'; Edjouma (yellow card) 90+8'; Raduović (yellow card) 90+9'	Stadium: Stadion Letná; Attendance: 17,229; Referee: Rohit Saggi (Norway)

13 August 2024 Second leg	FCSB (Romania)	2–3 (3–4 agg.)	(Czech Republic) Sparta Prague	Bucharest, Romania
20:30 EEST	Băluță (yellow card) 29'; Olaru (yellow card) 29', (goal) 60'; Lixandru (yellow card) 48'; Edjouma 85'; Târnovanu (yellow card) 90+4'; Crețu (yellow card) 90+6'	Report	Birmančević 13', 28' (pen.), (yellow card) 60'; Preciado (yellow card) 34'; Haraslín 37'; Sørensen (yellow card) 53'; Kuchta (yellow card) 79'	Stadium: Steaua Stadium; Attendance: 28,875; Referee: Morten Krogh (Denmark)

==== Play-off round ====
The play-off round draw was held on 5 August 2024, Sparta were drawn against Allsvenskan champions Malmö FF.

21 August 2024 First leg	Malmö FF (Sweden)	0–2	(Czech Republic) Sparta Prague	Malmö, Sweden
21:00 CEST	Busanello (yellow card) 11'; Peña (yellow card) 34'; Christiansen (yellow card) 69'	Report	Stryger 31' (o.g.); Olatunji (yellow card) 40'; Laçi (yellow card) 62'; Pešek (yellow card) 85'; Ryneš 89'	Stadium: Stadion; Attendance: 20,589; Referee: Jesús Gil Manzano (Spain)

27 August 2024 Second leg	Sparta Prague (Czech Republic)	2–0 (4–0 agg.)	(Sweden) Malmö FF	Prague, Czech Republic
21:00 CEST	Birmančević (penalty missed) 19'; Vitík (yellow card) 25'; Panák (yellow card) 45+1'; Haraslín 80' (pen.); Rrahmani 83', (yellow card) 84'	Report	Zätterström (yellow card) 17'; Jansson (yellow card) 17'; Christiansen (penalty missed) 27', (yellow card) 45+2'; Peña (yellow card) 41'	Stadium: Stadion Letná; Attendance: 18,215; Referee: Clément Turpin (France)

==== League phase ====
The league phase draw was held on 29 August 2024.

Pos	Team	Pld	W	D	L	GF	GA	GD	Pts
29	(Football Association of Serbia) Red Star Belgrade	8	2	0	6	13	22	−9	6
30	(Austrian Football Association) Sturm Graz	8	2	0	6	5	14	−9	6
31	(Football Association of the Czech Republic) Sparta Prague	8	1	1	6	7	21	−14	4
32	(German Football Association) RB Leipzig	8	1	0	7	8	15	−7	3
33	(Royal Spanish Football Federation) Girona	8	1	0	7	5	13	−8	3

Source: UEFA
Rules for classification: League phase tiebreakers

Round	1	2	3	4	5	6	7	8
Ground	H	A	A	H	H	A	H	A
Result	W	D	L	L	L	L		
Position	6	10	21	26	28	28		
Points	3	4	4	4	4	4		

Source: UEFA
A = Away; H = Home; W = Win; D = Draw; L = Loss

Win Draw Loss Fixtures

18 September 2024 1	Sparta Prague (Czech Republic)	3–0	(Austria) Red Bull Salzburg	Prague, Czech Republic
18:45 CEST	Kairinen 2'; Olatunji 42'; Laçi 58'; Vitík (yellow card) 87'	Report	Piątkowski (yellow card) 58'; Gourna-Douath (yellow card) 72'	Stadium: Stadion Letná; Attendance: 17,612; Referee: Rade Obrenović (Slovenia)

1 October 2024 2	VfB Stuttgart (Germany)	1–1	(Czech Republic) Sparta Prague	Stuttgart, Germany
18:45 CEST	Millot 7'; Stenzel (yellow card) 12'	Report	Kairinen 32', (yellow card) 77'	Stadium: MHPArena; Attendance: 60,000; Referee: Manfredas Lukjančukas (Lithuania)

23 October 2024 3	Manchester City (England)	5–0	(Czech Republic) Sparta Prague	Manchester, England
20:00 BST	Foden 3'; Stones (yellow card) 7', (goal) 64'; Haaland 58', 68'; Nunes 88' (pen.)	Report	Preciado (yellow card) 87'	Stadium: City of Manchester Stadium; Attendance: 50,116; Referee: Maurizio Mariani (Italy)

6 November 2024 4	Sparta Prague (Czech Republic)	1–2	(France) Brest	Prague, Czech Republic
21:00 CET	Ryneš (yellow card) 69'; Olatunji 90+2'	Report	Ajorque (yellow card) 23'; Fernandes 37'; Kairinen 80' (o.g.)	Stadium: Stadion Letná; Attendance: 18,033; Referee: Mykola Balakin (Ukraine)

26 November 2024 5	Sparta Prague (Czech Republic)	0–6	(Spain) Atlético Madrid	Prague, Czech Republic
18:45 CET	Pešek (yellow card) 65'	Report	Alvarez 15', 59'; Llorente 43'; Barrios (yellow card) 67'; Griezmann 70'; Correa 85', 89'	Stadium: Stadion Letná; Referee: Danny Makkelie (Netherlands)

11 December 2024 6	Feyenoord (Netherlands)	4–2	(Czech Republic) Sparta Prague	Rotterdam, Netherlands
21:00 CET	Trauner 8'; Paixão 10'; Hadj Moussa 30'; Giménez (yellow card) 51', (goal) 63'	Report	Vindahl (yellow card) 10'; Sørensen (yellow card) 37'; Rrahmani 43'; Vitík (yellow card) 53'; Beelen 79' (o.g.); Zelený (yellow card) 90'	Stadium: De Kuip; Attendance: 45,000; Referee: Tobias Stieler (Germany)

22 January 2025 7	Sparta Prague (Czech Republic)	0–1	(Italy) Inter Milan	Prague, Czech Republic
21:00 CET		Report	L. Martinez 12'	Stadium: Stadion Letná; Attendance: 18,010; Referee: Alejandro Hernandez Hernandez

29 January 2025 8	Bayer Leverkusen (Germany)	2–0	(Czech Republic) Sparta Prague	Leverkusen, Germany
21:00 CET	Wirtz 32'; Tella 64'	Report		Stadium: BayArena; Attendance: 30,210; Referee: Georgi Kabakov
