= Filip Panák =

Czech footballer (born 1995)

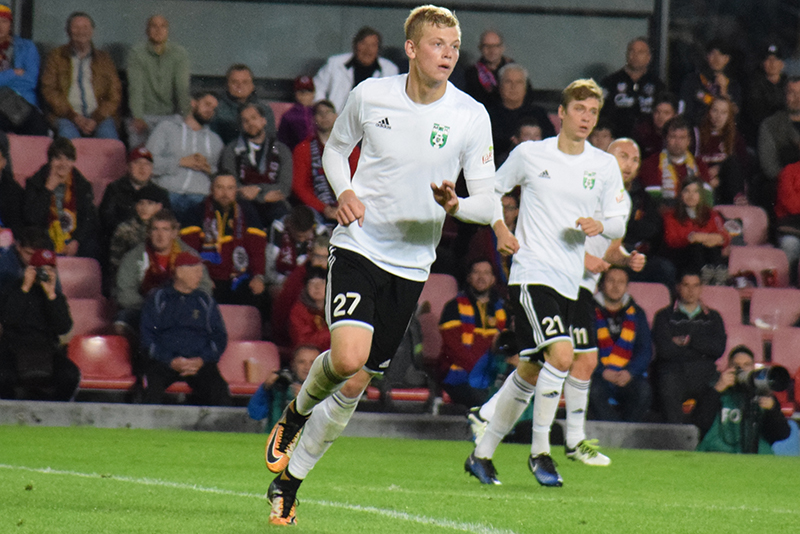

Personal information
- Date of birth: 2 November 1995 (age 31)
- Place of birth: Příbor, Czech Republic
- Height: 1.87 m (6 ft 2 in)
- Position: Centre-back

Team information
- Current team: Sparta Prague B
- Number: 27

Youth career
- Karviná

Senior career*
Years	Team	Apps	(Gls)
2014–2019	Karviná	84	(8)
2019–2026	Sparta Prague	107	(5)
2026–	Sparta Prague B	2	(0)

International career
2017	Czech Republic U21	2	(1)
- * Club domestic league appearances and goals as of 15 May 2026

Filip Panák (born 2 November 1995) is a Czech professional footballer who plays as a centre-back for Bohemian Football League club Sparta Prague B.

== Life ==
Filip Panák was born and raised in Příbor.

== Club career ==
Panák made his senior league debut for Karviná on 2 August 2014 in their 1–1 Czech National Football League home draw against Most. He scored his first league goal on 16 April 2016 in Karviná's 2–0 home win against Sokolov. After gaining promotion to the Czech First League with Karviná, Panák scored his first goal in the top flight after just 127 seconds of play.

== International career ==
Panák made his debut for the Czech Under-21 national team on 5 June 2017 in a 5–0 friendly victory against Azerbaijan, scoring a goal.

In November 2021 he was called up to the senior Czech Republic squad and was on the bench against Estonia.

== Career statistics ==
As of match played 1 April 2025

Appearances and goals by club, season and competition
Club	Season	League			Cup		Continental		Other		Total	
Club	Season	Division	Apps	Goals	Apps	Goals	Apps	Goals	Apps	Goals	Apps	Goals
Karviná	2014–15	Fortuna národní liga	4	0	1	0	—		—		5	0
Karviná	2015–16	Fortuna národní liga	11	1	2	0	—		—		13	1
Karviná	2016–17	Czech First League	27	3	3	0	—		—		30	3
Karviná	2017–18	Czech First League	30	3	3	0	—		—		33	3
Karviná	2018–19	Czech First League	12	1	1	1	—		—		13	2
Karviná	Total		84	8	10	1	—		—		94	9
Sparta Prague	2019–20	Czech First League	—		—		—		—		1	0
Sparta Prague	2020–21	Czech First League	—		—		—		—		0	0
Sparta Prague	2021–22	Czech First League	18	1	2	0	9	0	—		29	1
Sparta Prague	2022–23	Czech First League	15	0	5	0	0	0	—		20	0
Sparta Prague	2023–24	Czech First League	30	1	3	0	9	1	—		42	2
Sparta Prague	2024–25	Czech First League	23	1	0	0	9	0	—		32	1
Sparta Prague	Total		87	3	10	0	18	1	0	0	123	4
Career total			170	13	20	1	18	1	0	0	217	13

== Honours ==
Sparta Prague

- Czech First League: 2022–23, 2023–24
- Czech Cup: 2023–24
