= Kryštof Daněk =

Czech footballer

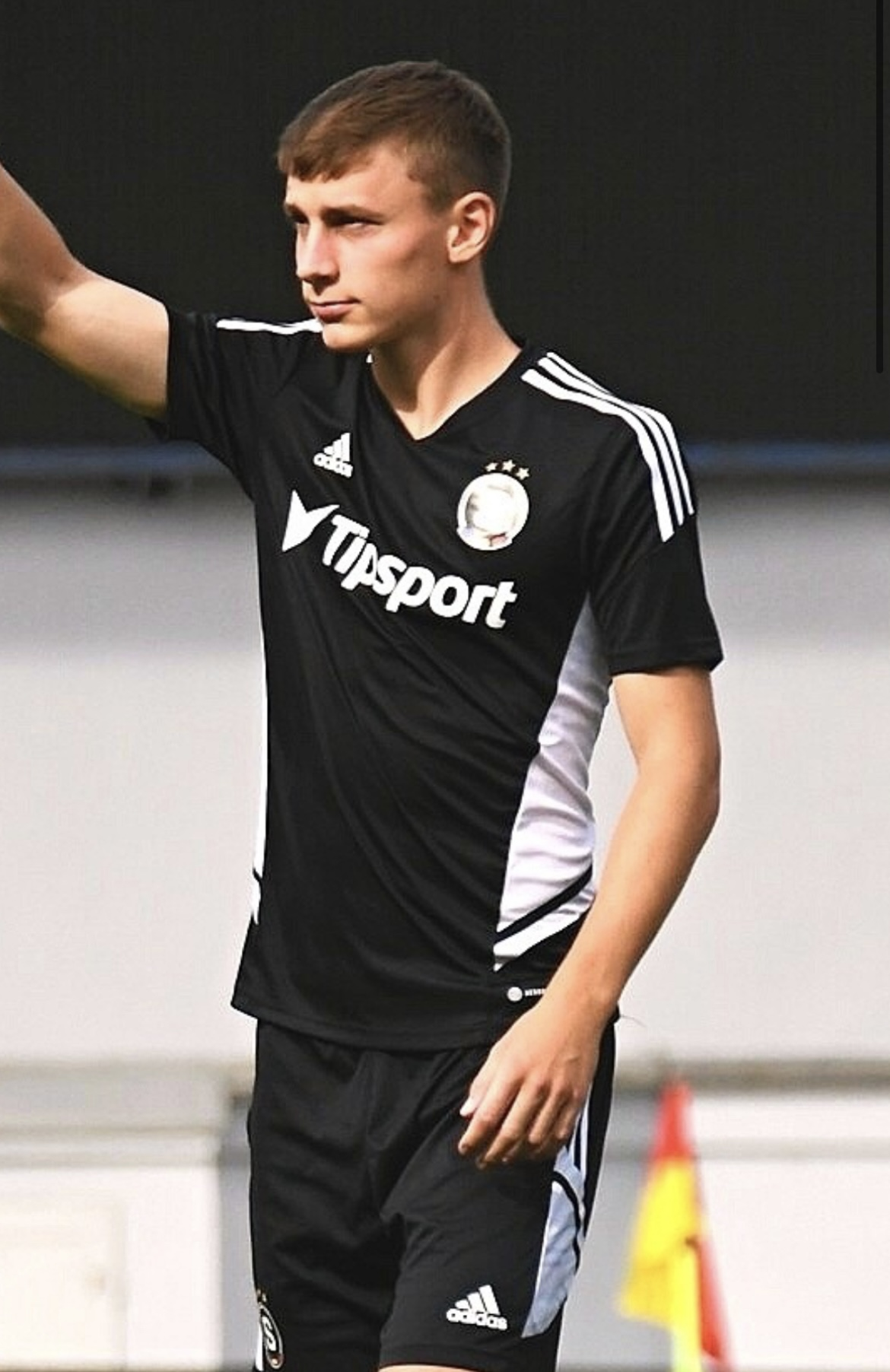

Personal information
- Date of birth: 5 January 2003 (age 23)
- Place of birth: Olomouc, Czech Republic
- Height: 1.82 m (6 ft 0 in)
- Position: Midfielder

Team information
- Current team: LASK
- Number: 9

Youth career
- 2009–2015: SK Chvalkovice
- 2015–2020: Sigma Olomouc

Senior career*
Years	Team	Apps	(Gls)
2020–2022	Sigma Olomouc	55	(5)
2022–2026	Sparta Prague	36	(2)
2023	→ Sparta Prague B	3	(2)
2023–2024	→ Pardubice (loan)	25	(8)
2025–2026	→ LASK (loan)	41	(3)
2026–	LASK	8	(1)

International career^{‡}
2017–2018	Czech Republic U15	13	(2)
2018–2019	Czech Republic U16	8	(1)
2019–2020	Czech Republic U17	4	(0)
2021–2024	Czech Republic U21	15	(2)
2025–	Czech Republic	3	(0)
- * Club domestic league appearances and goals as of 25 October 2026 ‡ National team caps and goals as of 15 November 2026

Kryštof Daněk (born 5 January 2003) is a Czech professional footballer playing as a midfielder for Austrian Bundesliga club LASK and the Czech Republic national team.

== Early life ==
Daněk started playing football for local club SK Chalkovice at the age of six. In 2015 he moved to Sigma Olomouc academy.

== Club career ==
=== Sigma Olomouc ===
Daněk made his professional debut for Sigma Olomouc in a 3-1 Czech Cup win over Jablonec in March 2020. In the rest of that season Danek made 3 other appearances in the league.

In the 2020-21 season Daněk played a more central role for Sigma Olomouc, scoring his first goal for the club in a 4–1 home win against Opava. In total in the 2020–21 season Daněk scored 3 goals in 26 appearances in all competitions. The next season Daněk scored 3 goals in 32 games in all competitions.

=== Sparta Prague ===
In June 2022 Daněk transferred to fellow Czech First League club Sparta Prague on a multi-year deal. Daněk made his debut for Sparta in a 2–1 home defeat to Slovan Liberec. He also scored his first goal in that game. His second goal for the club came in a 1–1 draw at home to Jablonec.

On 8 September 2023, Daněk joined Pardubice on a half-year loan deal.

On 6 February 2025, Daněk joined LASK on a half-year loan deal with option to make transfer permanent.

=== LASK ===
On 4 July 2025, Daněk joined LASK on a one-year loan deal with option to buy.. Daněk helped LASK to an Austrian Cup title, followed by the club's first Austrian Bundesliga title in 61 years.

== International career ==
Danek has represented the Czech Republic at U15, U16, U17 and U21 level.

== Career statistics ==
=== Club ===
As of match played 3 November 2026

Appearances and goals by club, season and competition
Club	Season	League			National cup (Note: Includes Czech Cup, Austrian Cup)		Europe		Total	
Club	Season	Division	Apps	Goals	Apps	Goals	Apps	Goals	Apps	Goals
Sigma Olomouc	2019–20	Czech First League	3	0	1	0	—		4	0
Sigma Olomouc	2021–21	Czech First League	23	3	3	0	—		26	3
Sigma Olomouc	2021–22	Czech First League	29	2	4	1	—		33	3
Sigma Olomouc	Total		55	5	8	1	—		63	6
Sparta Prague	2022–23	Czech First League	27	2	4	0	2 (Note: Appearances in UEFA Conference League)	0	33	2
Sparta Prague	2023–24	Czech First League	0	0	0	0	0	0	0	0
Sparta Prague	2024–25	Czech First League	9	0	1	0	5 (Note: Appearances in UEFA Champions League)	0	15	0
Sparta Prague	Total		36	2	5	0	7	0	48	2
Paradubice (loan)	2023–24	Czech First League	25	8	1	0	—		26	8
LASK (loan)	2024–25	Austrian Bundesliga	14	1	1	0	0	0	15	1
LASK (loan)	2025–26	Austrian Bundesliga	27	2	4	0	—		31	2
LASK (loan)	Total		41	3	5	0	—		46	3
LASK	2026–27	Austrian Bundesliga	8	1	3	2	5 (Note: Appearances in UEFA Champions League)	1	16	4
Career total			165	19	22	3	12	1	199	23

=== International ===
As of match played 15 November 2026

Appearances and goals by national team and year
National team	Year	Apps	Goals
Czech Republic	2025	2	0
Czech Republic	2026	1	0
Total		3	0

== Honours ==
Sparta Prague

- Czech First League: 2022–23

LASK

- Austrian Bundesliga: 2025–26
- Austrian Cup: 2025–26
