= Jakub Pešek =

Czech footballer

Personal information
- Date of birth: 24 June 1993 (age 33)
- Place of birth: Chrudim, Czech Republic
- Height: 1.74 m (5 ft 9 in)
- Position: Winger

Team information
- Current team: Sparta Prague B
- Number: 21

Youth career
- FC Hlinsko
- Chrudim
- –2014: Sparta Prague

Senior career*
Years	Team	Apps	(Gls)
2014–2016	Sparta Prague	1	(0)
2015–2017	→ České Budějovice (loan)	66	(6)
2017–2018	České Budějovice	28	(6)
2018–2021	Slovan Liberec	92	(15)
2021–2024	Sparta Prague	61	(9)
2025–2026	Wieczysta Kraków	15	(0)
2026	Zlín	11	(0)
2026–	Sparta Prague B	0	(0)

International career
2020–2022	Czech Republic	14	(5)
- * Club domestic league appearances and goals as of 27 May 2026

Jakub Pešek (born 24 June 1993) is a Czech professional footballer who plays as a winger for Bohemian Football League club Sparta Prague B.

== Career ==
Pešek made his professional debut for Sparta Prague in the Czech First League on 9 November 2014, coming on as a substitute against Slovácko in a 2–0 away win.

In January 2015, Pešek went on loan to České Budějovice before being signed permanently in mid-2017. Having scored 6 times in 28 league games for Budějovice in the 2017–18 season, he moved to Slovan Liberec at the start of the 2018–19 Czech First League. He rejoined Sparta Prague after the 2020–21 season, signing a three-year contract.

On 27 January 2025, Pešek moved to Polish third-tier club Wieczysta Kraków, signing an eighteen-month deal with an option for a further year. After featuring once for Wieczysta during the 2025–26 season, he terminated his contract by mutual consent on 9 February 2026. On the same day, Pešek signed a two-year contract with Czech First League club Zlín. On 1 July 2026, Pešek signed a contract with Bohemian Football League club Sparta Prague B.

== International career ==
On 7 September 2020, Pešek received his first call-up to the Czech Republic national team for 2020–21 UEFA Nations League B match against Scotland, in which he eventually debuted and scored the opening goal in the 12th minute, ending in a 1–2 loss for the Czechs.

== Career statistics ==
=== Club ===
As of match played 27 July 2025

Appearances and goals by club, season and competition
Club	Season	League			National cup (Note: Includes Czech Cup)		Continental		Other		Total	
Club	Season	Division	Apps	Goals	Apps	Goals	Apps	Goals	Apps	Goals	Apps	Goals
Sparta Prague	2014–15	Czech First League	1	0	2	0	—		—		3	0
České Budějovice (loan)	2014–15	Czech First League	12	0	—		—		—		13	0
České Budějovice (loan)	2015–16	Czech National Football League	25	3	1	0	—		—		26	3
České Budějovice (loan)	2016–17	Czech National Football League	29	3	2	0	—		—		31	3
České Budějovice (loan)	Total		66	6	3	0	—		—		98	6
České Budějovice	2017–18	Czech National Football League	28	6	1	0	—		—		29	6
Slovan Liberec	2018–19	Czech First League	27	2	4	1	—		—		31	3
Slovan Liberec	2019–20	Czech First League	34	7	6	2	—		—		40	9
Slovan Liberec	2020–21	Czech First League	31	6	3	1	7 (Note: Appearances in UEFA Europa League)	0	—		41	7
Slovan Liberec	Total		92	15	13	4	7	0	—		112	19
Sparta Prague	2021–22	Czech First League	32	7	3	1	11 (Note: Four appearances and one goal in UEFA Champions League, five appearances in UEFA Europa League, two appearances in UEFA Europa Conference League)	1	—		46	9
Sparta Prague	2022–23	Czech First League	3	0	0	0	2 (Note: Appearances in UEFA Europa Conference League)	0	—		5	0
Sparta Prague	2023–24	Czech First League	20	2	2	0	8 (Note: Two appearances in UEFA Champions League, six appearances in UEFA Europa League)	0	—		30	0
Sparta Prague	2024–25	Czech First League	6	0	1	1	3 (Note: Appearances in UEFA Champions League)	0	—		10	1
Sparta Prague	Total		61	9	6	2	24	1	—		91	12
Wieczysta Kraków	2024–25	II liga	12	0	—		—		2 (Note: Appearances in II liga promotion play-offs)	0	14	0
Wieczysta Kraków	2025–26	I liga	1	0	0	0	—		—		1	0
Wieczysta Kraków	Total		13	0	0	0	—		2	0	15	0
Career total			261	36	25	6	31	1	2	0	319	43

=== International ===
Appearances and goals by national team and year
National team	Year	Apps	Goals
Czech Republic	2020	1	1
Czech Republic	2021	8	3
Czech Republic	2022	5	1
Total		14	5

Scores and results list the Czech Republic's goal tally first, score column indicates score after each Pešek goal.

List of international goals scored by Jakub Pešek
No.	Date	Venue	Opponent	Score	Result	Competition
1	7 September 2020	Andrův stadion, Olomouc, Czech Republic	Scotland	1–0	1–2	2020–21 UEFA Nations League B
2	8 October 2021	Sinobo Stadium, Prague, Czech Republic	Wales	1–1	2–2	2022 FIFA World Cup qualification
3	11 November 2021	Andrův stadion, Olomouc, Czech Republic	Kuwait	2–0	7–0	Friendly
4	11 November 2021	Andrův stadion, Olomouc, Czech Republic	Kuwait	3–0	7–0	Friendly
5	5 June 2022	Sinobo Stadium, Prague, Czech Republic	Spain	1–0	2–2	2022–23 UEFA Nations League A

== Honours ==
Sparta Prague

- Czech First League: 2022–23, 2023–24
- Czech Cup: 2023–24
