= Lukáš Sadílek =

Czech footballer

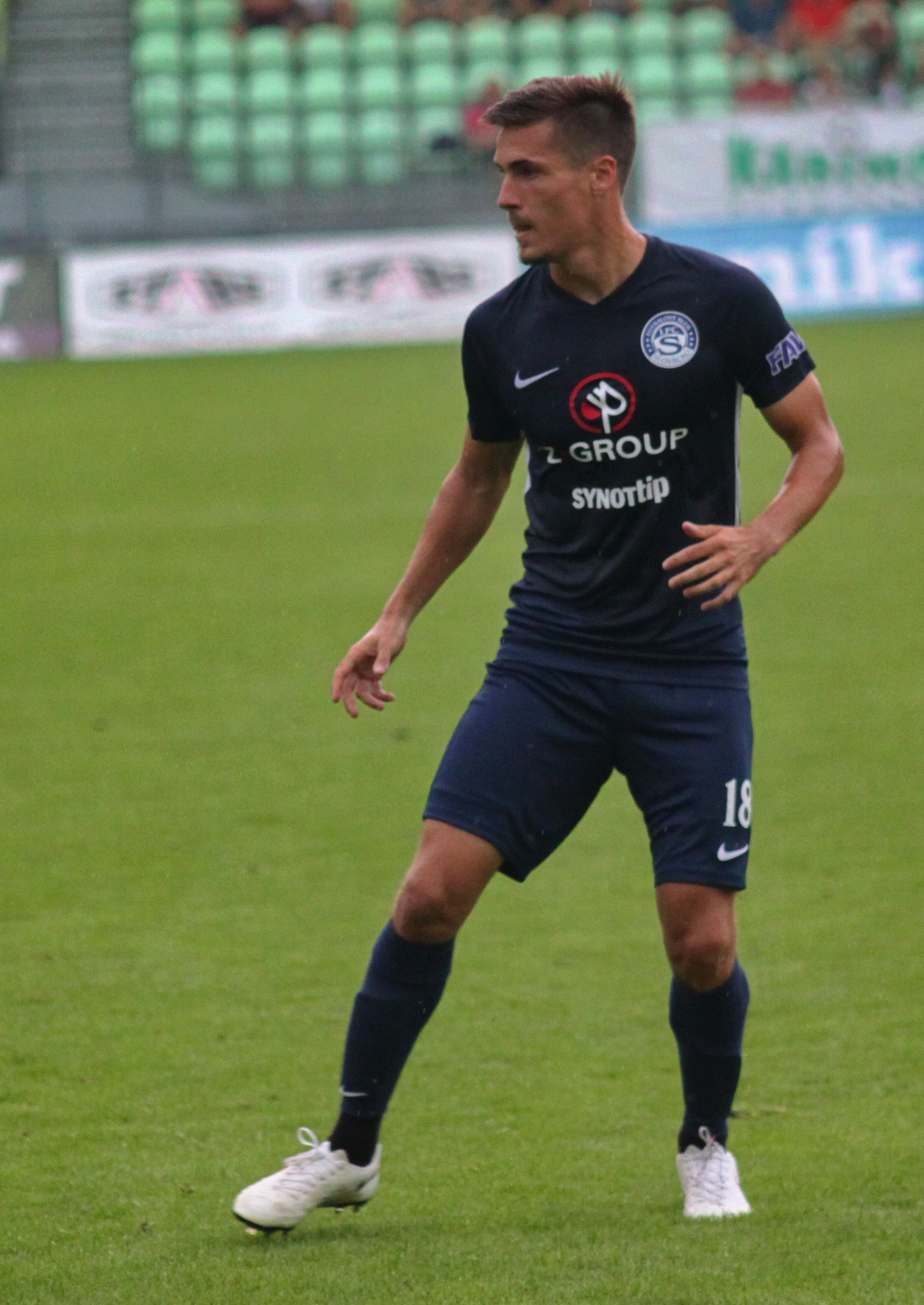
- Sadílek with Slovácko in 2018

Personal information
- Date of birth: 23 May 1996 (age 30)
- Place of birth: Uherské Hradiště, Czech Republic
- Height: 1.79 m (5 ft 10 in)
- Position: Midfielder

Team information
- Current team: Górnik Zabrze
- Number: 18

Youth career
- Slovácko

Senior career*
Years	Team	Apps	(Gls)
2015–2022	Slovácko	161	(16)
2016–2017	→ Sokolov (loan)	28	(2)
2022–2026	Sparta Prague	106	(7)
2026–	Górnik Zabrze	18	(5)

International career
2011–2012	Czech Republic U16	16	(0)
2012–2013	Czech Republic U17	12	(4)
2013–2014	Czech Republic U18	11	(2)
2014–2015	Czech Republic U19	9	(1)
2015–2018	Czech Republic U20	6	(1)
2023	Czech Republic	3	(0)
- * Club domestic league appearances and goals as of 11:34, 17 August 2026 (UTC)

Lukáš Sadílek (born 23 May 1996) is a Czech professional footballer who plays as a midfielder for Ekstraklasa club Górnik Zabrze.

== Club career ==
Sadílek made his career league debut for Slovácko on 30 August 2014 in a Czech First League 4–1 home win against Sigma Olomouc. He went on loan to Baník Sokolov in the second tier of Czech football in 2016, which was later extended for the remainder of the 2016–17 season.

On 5 January 2026, Sadílek signed a contract with Ekstraklasa club Górnik Zabrze until 2029.

== Personal life ==
His brother Michal is also a professional footballer.

== Career statistics ==
=== Club ===
As of match played 27 August 2026

Appearances and goals by club, season and competition
Club	Season	League			National cup (Note: Includes Czech Cup, Polish Cup)		Continental		Other		Total	
Club	Season	Division	Apps	Goals	Apps	Goals	Apps	Goals	Apps	Goals	Apps	Goals
Slovácko	2014–15	Czech First League	3	0	2	0	—		—		5	0
Slovácko	2015–16	Czech First League	17	0	1	0	—		—		18	0
Slovácko	2018–18	Czech First League	26	1	4	1	—		—		30	1
Slovácko	2018–19	Czech First League	24	5	1	0	—		—		25	5
Slovácko	2019–20	Czech First League	23	1	4	3	—		—		27	4
Slovácko	2020–21	Czech First League	34	6	2	0	—		—		36	6
Slovácko	2021–22	Czech First League	34	3	5	0	2 (Note: Appearances in UEFA Conference League)	0	—		41	3
Slovácko	Total		161	16	19	4	2	0	—		182	20
Sokolov (loan)	2016–17	Czech National Football League	28	2	1	0	—		—		29	2
Sparta Prague	2022–23	Czech First League	34	3	4	1	2	0	—		40	4
Sparta Prague	2023–24	Czech First League	32	1	4	0	12 (Note: Two appearances in UEFA Champions League, ten appearances in UEFA Europa League)	0	—		48	1
Sparta Prague	2024–25	Czech First League	32	3	4	0	10 (Note: Appearances in UEFA Champions League)	0	—		46	3
Sparta Prague	2025–26	Czech First League	8	0	2	0	4	1	—		14	1
Sparta Prague	Total		106	7	14	1	28	1	—		148	9
Górnik Zabrze	2025–26	Ekstraklasa	15	4	3	1	—		—		18	5
Górnik Zabrze	2026–27	Ekstraklasa	3	1	0	0	6 (Note: Two appearances in UEFA Champions League, two appearances in UEFA Europa League, two appearances in UEFA Conference League)	0	1 (Note: Appearance in Polish Super Cup)	0	10	1
Górnik Zabrze	Total		18	5	3	1	6	0	1	0	28	6
Career total			313	30	37	6	36	1	1	0	387	37

=== International ===
Appearances and goals by national team and year
National team	Year	Apps	Goals
Czech Republic	2023	3	0
Total		3	0

== Honours ==
Slovacko

- Czech Cup: 2021–22

Sparta Prague

- Czech First League: 2022–23, 2023–24
- Czech Cup: 2023–24

Górnik Zabrze

- Polish Cup: 2025–26
