= Mohamed El Maghrabi =

Egyptian footballer (born 2001)

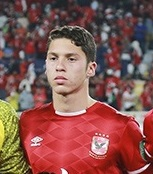
- El Maghraby with Al Ahly at the 2021 FIFA Club World Cup

Personal information
- Full name: Mohamed Mohamed Hitham Adnan El Maghrabi
- Date of birth: 28 April 2001 (age 25)
- Height: 1.83 m (6 ft 0 in)
- Position: Centre-back

Team information
- Current team: Ittihad Alex

Senior career*
Years	Team	Apps	(Gls)
2020–2024	Al Ahly	0	(0)
2022	→ Teplice B (loan)	16	(1)
2022	→ Teplice (loan)	1	(0)
2023–2024	→ Smouha (loan)	34	(0)
2024–	Ittihad Alex	0	(0)

International career^{‡}
- Egypt U20
- Egypt U23
Medal record
Representing Egypt
U-23 Africa Cup of Nations
Runner-up	Morocco 2023	U-23 Team
- * Club domestic league appearances and goals as of 25 August 2024 ‡ National team caps and goals as of 5 February 2022

Mohamed Mohamed Hitham Adnan El Maghrabi (Arabic: مُحَمَّد مُحَمَّد هَيْثَم عَدْنَان الْمَغْرِبِيّ; born 28 April 2001) is an Egyptian professional footballer who plays as a centre-back for Egyptian Premier League club Ittihad Alex.

== Club career ==
El Maghrabi's first taste of professional football came in January 2022, when he made his debut in the EFA League Cup against El Gouna. In February of the same year, he was named in the Al Ahly squad ahead of the 2021 FIFA Club World Cup. He would go on to make one appearance, starting in Al Ahly's opening 1–0 win over Mexican side Monterrey. He suffered an injury during the game, which ruled him out of the semi-final game against Brazilian side Palmeiras.

Later in February, El Maghrabi was sent on a two and a half season long loan to Czech side Teplice, alongside teammate Mohamed Yasser. The move was criticised by journalist Ahmed Schubert, who said that El Maghrabi would struggle against fully professional players in the Czech Republic. El Maghrabi himself said that he was happy with the move.

After nine appearances and a goal for Teplice's 'B' team in the Bohemian Football League, El Maghrabi made his debut for the club's first team, playing 90 minutes in a 2–0 Czech First League loss to Pardubice on 14 May 2022.

== Career statistics ==
=== Club ===
As of 10 May 2022.

Club	Season	League			National Cup		League Cup		Continental		Other		Total	
Club	Season	Division	Apps	Goals	Apps	Goals	Apps	Goals	Apps	Goals	Apps	Goals	Apps	Goals
Al Ahly	2021–22	Egyptian Premier League	0	0	0	0	3 (Note: Appearances in the EFA League Cup)	0	0	0	1 (Note: Appearances in the FIFA Club World Cup)	0	4	0
Teplice B (loan)	2021–22	ČFL	9	1	–		–		–		0	0	9	1
Teplice (loan)	2021–22	Fortuna liga	1	0	0	0	–		–		0	0	1	0
Career total			10	1	0	0	3	0	0	0	1	0	14	1

== Honours ==
Al Ahly

- FIFA Club World Cup: Third-Place 2021
