= Peter Vindahl =

Danish footballer (born 1998)

Personal information
- Full name: Peter Vindahl Jensen
- Date of birth: 16 February 1998 (age 28)
- Place of birth: Helsingør, Denmark
- Height: 1.95 m (6 ft 5 in)
- Position: Goalkeeper

Team information
- Current team: Sampdoria (on loan from Sparta Prague)
- Number: 1

Youth career
- HUI
- Lyngby
- 2015–2016: Nordsjælland

Senior career*
Years	Team	Apps	(Gls)
2016–2021	Nordsjælland	55	(0)
2021–2024	AZ	36	(0)
2023	→ 1. FC Nürnberg (loan)	14	(0)
2023–2024	→ Sparta Prague (loan)	33	(0)
2024–	Sparta Prague	57	(0)
2026–	→ Sampdoria (loan)	0	(0)

International career
2016	Denmark U18	1	(0)
2016–2017	Denmark U19	3	(0)
2018	Denmark U20	1	(0)
2018–2021	Denmark U21	4	(0)
- * Club domestic league appearances and goals as of 15 May 2026

Peter Vindahl Jensen (born 16 February 1998) is a Danish professional footballer who plays as a goalkeeper for Serie B club Sampdoria, on loan from Czech First League club Sparta Prague.

== Club career ==
=== FC Nordsjælland ===
Vindahl started his career at Hørup Ungdoms- og Idrætsforening (HUI), and later joined Lyngby Boldklub before he, at the age of 17, joined the Nordsjælland academy in January 2015. Already some months after his arrival, he began training with the first team. He was included in the first-team squad 11 times in his first season at the club, without making any appearances. Vindahl became a permanent part of the first team squad in January 2016.

Vindahl did not make any appearances in the following two seasons either, despite being in the squad 19 league games in total, until the 2018–19 season, where he made his official debut. This occurred on 26 September 2018 in a Danish Cup match against HB Køge, where he kept a clean sheet in a 4–0 win. In the first league game of newly appointed manager Flemming Pedersen on 30 March 2019, Vindahl made his Danish Superliga debut against FC Midtjylland, which ended 0–0.

On 10 January 2019, Vindahl signed a new contract extension keeping him in Nordsjælland until 2022.

=== AZ Alkmaar ===
On 16 August 2021, Vindahl signed a four-year contract with Eredivisie club AZ Alkmaar. In his first season at the club, Vindahl was first keeper, making a total of 48 appearances. But in his second season, he had to act as reserve for Hobie Verhulst.

In search of more playing time, German 2. Bundesliga club 1. FC Nürnberg could confirm on 11 December 2022 that Vindahl from January 2023 until the end of the season, would play for the club on a loan-deal.

On 25 July 2023, Vindahl joined Czech First League club Sparta Prague a one-year loan deal with an option.

=== Sparta Prague ===
On 8 March 2024, Vindahl signed a multi-year contract with Sparta Prague.

On 11 August 2026, Vindahl joined Serie B club Sampdoria on a one-year loan deal without an option.

== International career ==
In May 2018, Vindahl trained with the Denmark national team because they needed more goalkeepers for the training sessions. He was called up to the senior Denmark squad for the 2022 FIFA World Cup qualification matches against the Faroe Islands and Scotland on 12 and 15 November 2021, respectively.

== Career statistics ==
As of 15 March 2025

Appearances and goals by club, season and competition
Club	Season	League			Cup		Continental		Other		Total	
Club	Season	Division	Apps	Goals	Apps	Goals	Apps	Goals	Apps	Goals	Apps	Goals
Nordsjælland	2018–19	Danish Superliga	6	0	0	0	0	0	—		6	0
Nordsjælland	2019–20	Danish Superliga	10	0	1	0	—		—		11	0
Nordsjælland	2020–21	Danish Superliga	31	0	0	0	—		—		31	0
Nordsjælland	2021–22	Danish Superliga	5	0	0	0	—		—		5	0
Nordsjælland	Total		54	0	1	0	0	0	—		55	0
AZ	2021–22	Eredivisie	36	0	4	0	8	0	—		48	0
AZ	2022–23	Eredivisie	0	0	0	0	0	0	—		0	0
AZ	Total		36	0	4	0	8	0	0	0	48	0
1. FC Nürnberg (loan)	2022–23	2. Bundesliga	14	0	2	0	—		—		16	0
Sparta Prague (loan)	2023–24	Czech First League	33	0	0	0	14	0	—		47	0
Sparta Prague	2024–25	Czech First League	26	0	0	0	14	0	—		39	0
Career total			148	0	7	0	28	0	0	0	183	0

== Honours ==
Sparta Prague

- Czech First League: 2023–24
- Czech Cup: 2023–24

Individual

- Eredivisie Team of the Month: December 2021
