= Vojtěch Vorel =

Czech footballer

Personal information
- Date of birth: 18 June 1996 (age 30)
- Place of birth: Prague, Czech Republic
- Height: 1.93 m (6 ft 4 in)
- Position: Goalkeeper

Youth career
- Sparta Prague

Senior career*
Years	Team	Apps	(Gls)
2014–2026	Sparta Prague	2	(0)
2015–2017	→ Sellier & Bellot Vlašim (loan)	11	(0)
2018–2020	→ Senica (loan)	22	(0)
2020–2022	→ České Budějovice (loan)	37	(0)
2025	→ Pardubice (loan)	12	(0)
2026	→ Mladá Boleslav (loan)	2	(0)

International career^{‡}
2013	Czech Republic U17	3	(0)
2015–2017	Czech Republic U21	3	(0)
2016	Czech Republic U23	3	(0)
- * Club domestic league appearances and goals as of 27 May 2026 ‡ National team caps and goals as of 11 November 2017

Vojtěch Vorel (born 18 June 1996) is a Czech professional footballer who plays as a goalkeeper.

== Club career ==
Vorel made his professional Fortuna Liga debut for Senica against ViOn Zlaté Moravce on 18 May 2019.

On 18 January 2025, Vorel joined Pardubice on a half-year loan deal.

On 29 January 2026, Vorel joined Mladá Boleslav on a half-year loan deal.

== Career statistics ==
=== Club ===
As of match played 31 August 2024

Appearances and goals by club, season and competition
Club	Season	League			National cup		Continental		Total	
Club	Season	Division	Apps	Goals	Apps	Goals	Apps	Goals	Apps	Goals
Sparta Prague	2014–15	Czech First League	0	0	—		0	0	0	0
Sparta Prague	2017–18	Czech First League	0	0	—		—		0	0
Sparta Prague	2022–23	Czech First League	0	0	1	0	0	0	1	0
Sparta Prague	2023–24	Czech First League	2	0	5	0	0	0	7	0
Sparta Prague	2024–25	Czech First League	0	0	—		0	0	0	0
Sparta Prague	Total		2	0	6	0	0	0	8	0
Sellier & Bellot Vlašim (loan)	2015–16	Czech National Football League	9	0	—		—		9	0
Sellier & Bellot Vlašim (loan)	2016–17	Czech National Football League	2	0	—		—		2	0
Sellier & Bellot Vlašim (loan)	Total		11	0	—		—		11	0
Senica (loan)	2018–19	Slovak First Football League	2	0	0	0	—		2	0
Senica (loan)	2019–20	Slovak First Football League	20	0	0	0	—		20	0
Senica (loan)	Total		22	0	0	0	—		22	0
Dynamo České Budějovice (loan)	2020–21	Czech First League	12	0	1	0	—		13	0
Dynamo České Budějovice (loan)	2021–22	Czech First League	25	0	0	0	—		25	0
Dynamo České Budějovice (loan)	Total		37	0	1	0	—		38	0
Sparta Prague B	2022–23	Czech National Football League	5	0	—		—		5	0
Career Total			77	0	7	0	0	0	84	0

== Honours ==
Sparta Prague

- Czech First League: 2022–23, 2023–24
- Czech Cup: 2023–24
