= Matěj Ryneš =

Czech footballer

Personal information
- Date of birth: 30 May 2001 (age 25)
- Place of birth: Horní Planá, Czech Republic
- Height: 1.86 m (6 ft 1 in)
- Position: Left midfielder

Team information
- Current team: Sparta Prague
- Number: 11

Youth career
- 2007–2012: Smrčina Horní Planá
- 2011: Slavoj Český Krumlov
- 2012–2017: Dynamo České Budějovice
- 2017–2020: Sparta Prague

Senior career*
Years	Team	Apps	(Gls)
2020–2023	Sparta Prague B	30	(4)
2022–	Sparta Prague	83	(3)
2022–2023	→ Hradec Králové (loan)	25	(3)

International career^{‡}
2020	Czech Republic U19	2	(0)
2021	Czech Republic U20	6	(0)
2022–2023	Czech Republic U21	3	(0)
2024–	Czech Republic	2	(0)
- * Club domestic league appearances and goals as of 23 August 2026 ‡ National team caps and goals as of 13 November 2025

Matěj Ryneš (born 30 May 2001) is a Czech professional footballer who plays as a left midfielder for Czech First League club Sparta Prague and the Czech Republic national team.

On 7 September 2024, Ryneš debuted for the Czech Republic national team in a Nations League match against Georgia at the Mikheil Meskhi Stadium. He started the game, but had to came off as a substitute after 26 minutes due to injury, as Georgia won 4–1.

== Career statistics ==
=== Club ===
As of match played 9 November 2025

Appearances and goals by club, season and competition
Club	Season	League			Czech Cup		Europe		Other		Total	
Club	Season	Division	Apps	Goals	Apps	Goals	Apps	Goals	Apps	Goals	Apps	Goals
Sparta Prague B	2019–20	Bohemian Football League	1	0	—		—		—		1	0
Sparta Prague B	2020–21	Bohemian Football League	5	0	—		—		—		5	0
Sparta Prague B	2021–22	Czech National Football League	23	4	—		—		—		23	4
Sparta Prague B	2023–24	Czech National Football League	1	0	—		—		—		1	0
Sparta Prague B	Total		30	4	—		—		—		30	4
Sparta Prague	2021–22	Czech First League	1	0	3	0	0	0	—		4	0
Sparta Prague	2023–24	Czech First League	28	1	5	0	7 (Note: Appearances in UEFA Europa League)	0	—		40	1
Sparta Prague	2024–25	Czech First League	22	1	2	0	11 (Note: Appearances in UEFA Champions League)	1	—		35	2
Sparta Prague	2025–26	Czech First League	12	0	1	0	8 (Note: Appearances in UEFA Conference League)	0	—		21	0
Sparta Prague	Total		63	2	11	0	26	1	0	0	100	3
Hradec Králové (loan)	2022–23	Czech First League	25	3	2	0	—		—		27	3
Career total			118	9	13	0	26	1	0	0	157	10

=== International ===
As of match played 13 November 2025

Appearances and goals by national team and year
National team	Year	Apps	Goals
Czech Republic	2024	1	0
Czech Republic	2025	1	0
Total		2	0
