= Shushufindi Canton =

- Canton
- Location of Sucumbíos Province in Ecuador.

- Shushufindi Canton in Sucumbíos Province
- Coordinates: 0.1871°S 76.645°W
- Country: Ecuador
- Province: Sucumbíos Province
- Time zone: UTC-5 (ECT)

Shushufindi Canton is a canton of Ecuador, located in the Sucumbíos Province. Its capital is the town of Shushufindi. Its population at the 2001 census was 32,184.
