= Mohamed Yasser =

Egyptian footballer (born 2001)

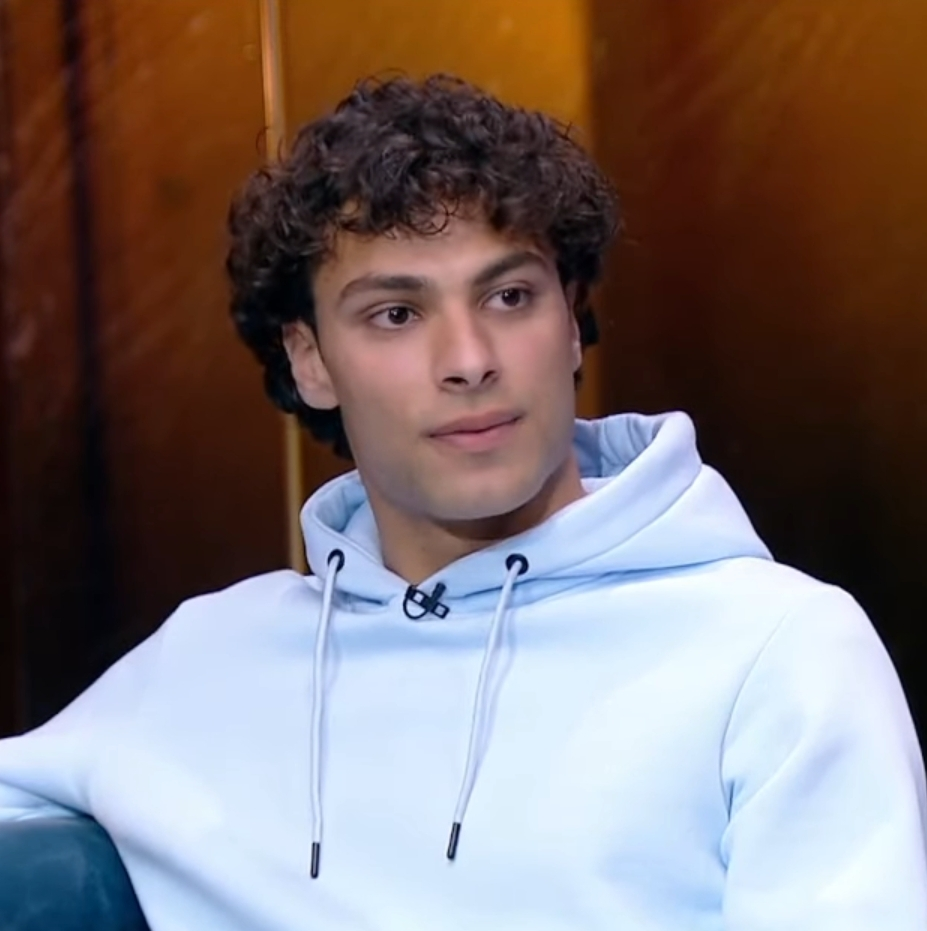
- Yasser on Al Ahly TV in 2022

Personal information
- Full name: Mohammed Yasser Fawzi Nour
- Date of birth: 5 May 2001 (age 25)
- Place of birth: Egypt
- Height: 1.93 m (6 ft 4 in)
- Position: Striker

Team information
- Current team: Sigma Olomouc
- Number: 35

Youth career
- Al Ahly

Senior career*
Years	Team	Apps	(Gls)
2022–2025	Al Ahly	0	(0)
2022–2025	→ Teplice (loan)	56	(10)
2022–2024	→ Teplice B (loan)	17	(3)
2025–	Sigma Olomouc	9	(1)
- * Club domestic league appearances and goals as of 27 May 2026

Mohammed Yasser Fawzi Nour (Arabic: محمد ياسر; born 5 May 2001) is an Egyptian professional footballer who plays as a striker for Czech First League club Sigma Olomouc.

== Career ==
=== Al Ahly ===
Yasser started his professional career in January 2022 with Al Ahly, when he made his debut in the Egyptian League Cup against Al Mokawloon.

Later in February, Yasser was sent on a two and a half season long loan to Czech side Teplice, alongside teammate Mohamed El Maghrabi.

=== Teplice ===
He came on loan to FK Teplice in the Czech First League in 2022, after the clubs established cooperation. His loan was gradually extended to 2023 and then to 2024. He started in the B team of Teplice. He debuted for A team of Teplice in the 1–0 home win against FC Hradec Králové on 2 April 2024, when he presented himself with a red card. On 25 April 2024, he attracted the attention of the media when he stood in goal in the match with FK Mladá Boleslav after goalkeeper Tomáš Grigar was sent off in the 90th minute.

On 16 September 2025, Yasser signed a two-year contract with Czech First League club Sigma Olomouc.

== Personal life ==
Yasser is a Muslim. His role models are Zlatan Ibrahimović and Luis Suárez.

== Career statistics ==
=== Club ===
As of 28 October 2024

Appearances and goals by club, season and competition
Club	Season	League			Cup		Continental		Other		Total	
Club	Season	Division	Apps	Goals	Apps	Goals	Apps	Goals	Apps	Goals	Apps	Goals
Al Ahly	2021–22	EPL	0	0	0	0	0	0	1 (Note: Appearances in the Egyptian League Cup)	0	1	0
Teplice B (loan)	2022–23	ČFL	14	2	–		–		0	0	14	2
Teplice (loan)	2022–23	Czech First League	9	0	0	0	–		0	0	9	0
Teplice (loan)	Total		23	2	0	0	0	0	1	0	24	2
Teplice B (loan)	2023–24	ČFL	3	1	–		–		0	0	3	1
Teplice (loan)	2023–24	Czech First League	27	5	2	0	–		0	0	29	5
Teplice (loan)	2024–25	Czech First League	4	1	1	0	–		0	0	5	1
Teplice (loan)	Total		34	6	7	0	0	0	0	0	37	7
Career total			57	9	3	0	0	0	1	0	61	9
