= 2023–24 Czech First League =

Czech First League
- Season: 2023–24
- Dates: 22 July 2023 – 31 May 2024
- Champions: Sparta
- Relegated: Zlín
- Champions League: Sparta, Slavia
- Europa League: Plzeň
- Conference League: Ostrava, Mladá Boleslav
- Matches: 277
- Goals: 804 (2.9 per match)
- Top goalscorer: Václav Jurečka (19 goals)
- Biggest home win: Ostrava 6–0 Slovácko; 26 May 2024
- Biggest away win: Zlín 1–7 Plzeň; 17 September 2023
- Highest scoring: Zlín 5–9 Mladá Boleslav; 21 October 2023
- Longest winning run: Sparta (9 matches)
- Longest unbeaten run: Slavia (13 matches)
- Longest winless run: Zlín & České Budějovice (8 matches)
- Longest losing run: České Budějovice (7 matches)
- Highest attendance: 19,370; Slavia 1–1 Sparta; 24 September 2023
- Lowest attendance: 783; Č. Budějovice 0–2 Hr. Králové; 13 December 2023
- Total attendance: 1,782,387
- Average attendance: 6,435

The 2023–24 Czech First League, known as the Fortuna liga for sponsorship reasons, was the 31st season of the Czech Republic's top-tier football for professional clubs since its establishment in 1993. Sparta Prague were the reigning champions. The season started in July 2023. The first half of the season had 19 rounds, finishing in December, and the other half commenced in February 2024. The season ended on 31 May 2024, with two extra play-out fixtures on 29 May and 2 June 2024.

In the 12th round, the highest number of goals in one game in the history of the Czech First League was seen in the match Zlín against Mladá Boleslav, which ended 5–9.

== Format ==
The season format remained unchanged from last season, 16 clubs played each other home and away, until the league was split up in championship, Conference League and relegation groups. The lowest-ranked team was relegated directly to the second league, and the two teams positioned 14th and 15th played a play-off with two teams from the second league positioned 2nd and 3rd in a home and away format. This was the sixth season to use VAR, featuring it in all matches played. The only change in the rules was the limited number of players that could be sent on loan.

== Teams ==
Locations of the 2023–24 Czech First League teams

=== Promotion and relegation (pre-season) ===
A total of sixteen teams contested the league, including fifteen sides from the 2022–23 season and the winner of last season's second league.

Team promoted to Czech First League

After being relegated in the 2021–22 season, MFK Karviná returned to Czech First League as the champion of the 2022–23 Czech National Football League.

Teams relegated from Czech First League

The lowest positioned team from the last season, Zbrojovka Brno, was relegated to the Czech National Football League.

=== Locations and stadiums ===
Team	Location	Stadium	Capacity	Ref.
Bohemians 1905	Prague	Ďolíček	6,300	
SK Dynamo České Budějovice	České Budějovice	Stadion Střelecký ostrov	6,681	
FC Hradec Králové	Hradec Králové	Malšovická aréna	9,300	
FK Jablonec	Jablonec nad Nisou	Stadion Střelnice	6,108	
MFK Karviná	Karviná	Městský stadion (Karviná)	4,833	
FC Slovan Liberec	Liberec	Stadion u Nisy	9,900	
FK Mladá Boleslav	Mladá Boleslav	Lokotrans Aréna	5,000	
SK Sigma Olomouc	Olomouc	Andrův stadion	12,474	
FC Baník Ostrava	Ostrava	Městský stadion (Ostrava)	15,123	
FK Pardubice	Pardubice	CFIG Arena	4,620	
FC Viktoria Plzeň	Plzeň	Doosan Arena	11,700	
SK Slavia Prague	Prague	Fortuna Arena	19,370	
1. FC Slovácko	Uherské Hradiště	Městský fotbalový stadion Miroslava Valenty	8,000	
AC Sparta Prague	Prague	epet ARENA	18,944	
FK Teplice	Teplice	Na Stínadlech	18,221	
FC Zlín	Zlín	Letná Stadion	5,898	

Rank	Region	Number of teams	Club(s)
1	Prague	3	Bohemians 1905, Sparta Prague, Slavia Prague
2	Liberec	2	Jablonec, Slovan Liberec
2	Moravian-Silesian	2	Baník Ostrava, Karviná
2	Zlín	2	Zlín, Slovácko
5	Central Bohemian	1	Mladá Boleslav
5	Hradec Králové	1	Hradec Králové
5	Olomouc	1	Sigma Olomouc
5	Pardubice	1	Pardubice
5	Plzeň	1	Viktoria Plzeň
5	South Bohemian	1	Dynamo České Budějovice
5	Ústí nad Labem	1	Teplice

== Managerial changes ==
Ahead of the season:

Team	Outgoing manager	Manner of departure	Date of vacancy	Replaced by	Date of appointment	Contract valid until
Hradec Králové	(Czech Republic) Miroslav Koubek	End of contract	30 June 2023	(Czech Republic) Jozef Weber	10 May 2023	Undisclosed
Viktoria Plzeň	(Czech Republic) Michal Bílek	End of contract	30 June 2023	(Czech Republic) Miroslav Koubek	5 June 2023	June 2024
Jablonec	(Czech Republic) David Horejš	Sacked	29 May 2023	(Czech Republic) Radoslav Látal	30 June 2023	Undisclosed
Mladá Boleslav	(Czech Republic) Pavel Hoftych	Mutual consent	26 May 2023	(Czech Republic) Marek Kulič	26 May 2023	Undisclosed

During the season:

Team	Outgoing manager	Manner of departure	Date of vacancy	Match-week	Position in table	Replaced by	Date of appointment	Contract valid until
Hradec Králové	(Czech Republic) Jozef Weber	Sacked	18 September 2023	8	11th	(Czech Republic) Václav Kotal	18 September 2023	Undisclosed
Karviná	(Czech Republic) Tomáš Hejdušek	Sacked	18 September 2023	8	15th	(Slovakia) Juraj Jarábek	27 September 2023	Undisclosed
Zlín	(Czech Republic) Pavel Vrba	Sacked	23 October 2023	12	16th	(Czech Republic) Bronislav Červenka	25 October 2023	Undisclosed
České Budějovice	(Czech Republic) Marek Nikl	Sacked	23 October 2023	15	16th	None	None	None
České Budějovice	(Czech Republic) Tomáš Zápotočný	Mutual consent	13 December 2023	18	16th	(Czech Republic) Jiří Lerch	13 December 2023	Undisclosed
Mladá Boleslav	(Czech Republic) Marek Kulič	Sacked	30 December 2023	19	7th	(Czech Republic) David Holoubek	2 January 2024	June 2028
Sigma Olomouc	(Czech Republic) Václav Jílek	Sacked	26 February 2024	22	8th	Jiří Saňák	26 February 2024	Undisclosed
Hradec Králové	(Czech Republic) Václav Kotal	Mutual consent	28 February 2024	22	12th	(Czech Republic) David Horejš	28 February 2024	Undisclosed
Karviná	(Slovakia) Juraj Jarábek	Sacked	12 March 2024	25	16th	(Czech Republic) Marek Bielan	12 March 2024	June 2024

== Regular season ==
=== League table ===
Pos	Team	Pld	W	D	L	GF	GA	GD	Pts	Qualification or relegation
1	Sparta Prague	30	24	4	2	70	26	+44	76	Qualification for the Championship group
2	Slavia Prague	30	22	6	2	62	23	+39	72	Qualification for the Championship group
3	Viktoria Plzeň	30	19	5	6	67	33	+34	62	Qualification for the Championship group
4	Baník Ostrava	30	13	6	11	48	39	+9	45	Qualification for the Championship group
5	Mladá Boleslav	30	12	8	10	50	46	+4	44	Qualification for the Championship group
6	Slovácko	30	11	8	11	39	40	−1	41	Qualification for the Championship group
7	Slovan Liberec	30	10	10	10	46	46	0	40	Qualification for the Play-off
8	Sigma Olomouc	30	10	7	13	40	45	−5	37	Qualification for the Play-off
9	Hradec Králové	30	9	10	11	32	38	−6	37	Qualification for the Play-off
10	Teplice	30	9	9	12	31	40	−9	36	Qualification for the Play-off
11	Bohemians 1905	30	8	11	11	29	40	−11	35	Qualification for the Relegation group
12	Jablonec	30	6	12	12	35	45	−10	30	Qualification for the Relegation group
13	Pardubice	30	7	7	16	29	42	−13	28	Qualification for the Relegation group
14	Karviná	30	6	7	17	30	52	−22	25	Qualification for the Relegation group
15	Zlín	30	5	10	15	36	61	−25	25	Qualification for the Relegation group
16	České Budějovice	30	6	6	18	34	62	−28	24	Qualification for the Relegation group

Source: Fortuna Liga
Rules for classification: 1) Points; 2) Head-to-head points; 3) Head-to-head goal difference; 4) Head-to-head goals scored; 5) Goal difference; 6) Goals scored; 7) Fair-play ranking; 8) Draw.

=== Results ===
Home \ Away	BOH	CBU	HKR	JAB	KAR	LIB	MLA	OLO	OST	PCE	PLZ	SLA	SLO	SPA	TEP	ZLN
Bohemians 1905	—	0–0	2–1	2–0	1–0	0–0	0–0	3–2	1–1	2–1	0–2	0–2	0–1	1–3	1–2	0–0
České Budějovice	3–0	—	0–2	2–1	1–0	3–2	1–2	2–1	3–0	0–1	2–5	1–3	2–2	0–1	0–1	2–2
Hradec Králové	2–2	5–1	—	1–0	2–1	1–1	0–0	1–3	2–3	2–0	1–1	1–2	1–0	1–3	1–0	2–0
Jablonec	0–1	5–2	1–1	—	0–0	1–1	1–1	1–1	2–3	2–1	1–2	1–1	2–0	1–5	3–2	0–0
Karviná	1–1	2–1	1–0	1–1	—	5–2	1–2	0–2	1–3	0–3	0–0	0–3	1–3	0–3	0–1	4–1
Slovan Liberec	0–1	1–0	0–0	3–3	1–0	—	2–1	2–0	3–1	1–0	3–0	2–3	4–1	0–2	3–3	5–3
Mladá Boleslav	2–1	3–1	5–1	3–1	2–2	2–2	—	2–1	1–3	1–0	1–3	0–1	0–1	3–1	1–2	3–2
Sigma Olomouc	2–2	2–1	0–0	1–0	3–1	2–0	4–0	—	0–3	0–2	1–3	1–3	1–1	1–4	2–1	0–0
Baník Ostrava	1–1	2–0	2–0	0–1	2–2	2–2	2–0	1–2	—	1–1	0–1	2–3	0–0	0–1	4–1	5–1
Pardubice	0–1	1–1	1–1	0–0	2–1	2–0	1–2	1–1	0–1	—	2–3	0–1	0–1	1–2	1–1	0–1
Viktoria Plzeň	2–0	5–0	1–1	3–2	0–1	1–3	1–1	2–1	3–1	6–2	—	1–0	1–4	4–0	3–0	3–0
Slavia Prague	2–1	2–1	2–0	4–3	5–1	3–0	2–0	2–2	1–0	3–0	1–2	—	2–0	1–1	4–0	2–1
Slovácko	5–2	4–1	0–0	0–1	2–0	1–1	2–2	0–2	2–0	1–2	1–1	1–3	—	1–3	2–0	1–0
Sparta Prague	2–0	4–0	2–1	3–0	3–1	2–1	1–1	2–0	4–3	5–2	2–1	0–0	5–0	—	2–1	2–0
Teplice	1–1	2–2	0–1	0–0	2–2	2–0	1–0	2–0	0–1	0–1	1–0	0–0	1–1	1–1	—	2–1
Zlín	2–2	1–1	4–0	1–1	0–1	1–1	5–9	3–2	0–1	1–1	1–7	1–1	2–1	0–1	2–1	—

Source: Fortuna Liga
Legend: Blue = home team win; Yellow = draw; Red = away team win.

== Championship group ==
Points and goals were carried over in full from the regular season.

Pos	Team	Pld	W	D	L	GF	GA	GD	Pts	Qualification or relegation	SPA	SLA	PLZ	OST	MLA	SLO
1	Sparta Prague (C)	35	27	6	2	82	30	+52	87	Qualification for the Champions League second qualifying round	—	0–0	1–1	2–1	—	—
2	Slavia Prague	35	26	7	2	76	24	+52	85	Qualification for the Champions League third qualifying round (Note: Since the Europa League winners, Atalanta qualified for the Champions League via league position, Slavia Prague were promoted from the Champions League second qualifying round to the third qualifying round as one of the two teams with the highest coefficient in the second qualifying round.)	—	—	3–0	5–0	4–0	—
3	Viktoria Plzeň	35	21	7	7	76	40	+36	70	Qualification for the Europa League third qualifying round	—	—	—	1–1	3–0	4–2
4	Baník Ostrava	35	14	7	14	56	48	+8	49	Qualification for the Conference League second qualifying round	—	—	—	—	0–1	6–0
5	Mladá Boleslav (O)	35	13	8	14	51	59	−8	47	Qualification for the Conference League play-off final	0–5	—	—	—	—	0–1
6	Slovácko	35	12	8	15	45	56	−11	44		2–4	1–2	—	—	—	—

Source: Fortuna Liga
Legend: Blue = home team win; Yellow = draw; Red = away team win.
Rules for classification: 1) Total points; 2) Points earned in regular season; 3) Head-to-head points (regular season); 4) Head-to-head goal difference (regular season); 5) Head-to-head goals scored (regular season); 5) Goal difference (all matches); 6) Goals scored (all matches); 7) Fair-play ranking; 8) Draw.
(C) Champions; (O) Play-off winners

== Conference League play-off ==
Teams placed between 7th and 10th position took part in the Conference League play-off. The play-off winner faced the fifth-placed team of the championship group to determine the Conference League play-off winners. The winners qualified for the second qualifying round of the 2024–25 UEFA Conference League.

First round
Teplice	2	2	4
Slovan Liberec	0	1	1
Hradec Králové	3	3	6
Sigma Olomouc	1	1	2

Second round
Teplice	0	0	0
Hradec Králové	1	2	3

=== Final ===
31 May 2024
18:00 CEST

Mladá Boleslav	3–1	Hradec Králové
Mareček 13'; Kostka 45+1'; Matĕjovský 54' (pen.)		Klíma (red card) 42'; Čmelík 83'

Lokotrans Aréna, Mladá Boleslav
Attendance: 4,173
Referee: Ondřej Berka

== Relegation group ==
Points and goals were carried over in full from the regular season.

Pos	Team	Pld	W	D	L	GF	GA	GD	Pts	Qualification or relegation	JAB	PCE	BOH	KAR	CBU	ZLN
11	Jablonec	35	9	14	12	45	50	−5	41		—	3–0	—	3–2	—	1–0
12	Pardubice	35	11	7	17	39	47	−8	40		—	—	—	4–0	3–2	2–0
13	Bohemians 1905	35	9	12	14	34	48	−14	39		1–1	0–1	—	1–3	—	—
14	Karviná (O)	35	8	8	19	38	62	−24	32	Qualification for the relegation play-offs	—	—	—	—	1–0	2–2
15	České Budějovice (O)	35	7	8	20	41	70	−29	29	Qualification for the relegation play-offs	2–2	—	2–1	—	—	—
16	Zlín (R)	35	5	12	18	40	69	−29	27	Relegation to FNL	—	—	1–2	—	1–1	—

Source: Fortuna Liga
Legend: Blue = home team win; Yellow = draw; Red = away team win.
Rules for classification: 1) Total points; 2) Points earned in regular season; 3) Head-to-head points (regular season); 4) Head-to-head goal difference (regular season); 5) Head-to-head goals scored (regular season); 5) Goal difference (all matches); 6) Goals scored (all matches); 7) Fair-play ranking; 8) Draw.
(O) Play-off winners; (R) Relegated

== Relegation play-offs ==
Teams placed 14th and 15th in the relegation group faced the teams placed 2nd and 3rd in the Czech National Football League for two spots in the next season.

Team 1	Agg.	Team 2	1st leg	2nd leg
Vyškov	0–2	Karviná	0–1	0–1
České Budějovice	3–2	Silon Táborsko	2–1	1–1

== Season statistics ==
=== Top scorers ===
Rank	Player	Club	Goals
1	(Czech Republic) Václav Jurečka	Slavia	19
2	(Czech Republic) Pavel Šulc	Plzeň	18
3	(Czech Republic) Jan Kuchta	Sparta	17
4	(Serbia) Veljko Birmančević	Sparta	16
4	(Czech Republic) Mojmír Chytil	Slavia	16
6	(Brazil) Ewerton	Ostrava	14
7	(Slovakia) Lukáš Haraslín	Sparta	12
7	(Czech Republic) Marek Havlík	Slovácko	12
7	(Czech Republic) Lukáš Juliš	Olomouc	12
7	(Czech Republic) Tomáš Chorý	Plzeň	12

=== Hat-tricks ===
Matchweek	Date	Player	For	Against	Result
4	13 August 2023	(Czech Republic) Pavel Šulc	Plzeň	České Budějovice	5–2 (A)
18	9 December 2023	(Czech Republic) Marek Havlík^{4}	Slovácko	Bohemians 1905	5–2 (H)
22	25 February 2024	(Czech Republic) Mojmír Chytil	Slavia	Pardubice	3–0 (H)
32	11 May 2024	(Czech Republic) Pavel Šulc	Plzeň	Slovácko	4–2 (H)
34	18 May 2024	(Czech Republic) Jan Kuchta^{4}	Sparta	Mladá Boleslav	5–0 (A)
34	19 May 2024	(Czech Republic) Ladislav Krobot	Pardubice	Karviná	4–0 (H)

Notes

^{4} Player scored 4 goals
(H) – Home team
(A) – Away team

=== Clean sheets ===
Rank	Player	Club	Clean sheets
1	(Czech Republic) Martin Jedlička	Bohemians 1905 / Plzeň	13
2	(Denmark) Peter Vindahl	Sparta	12
3	(Czech Republic) Jiří Letáček	Ostrava	9
4	(Czech Republic) Milan Heča	Slovácko	8
4	(Czech Republic) Jindřich Staněk	Plzeň / Slavia	8
4	(Czech Republic) Aleš Mandous	Slavia	8
4	(Czech Republic) Adam Zadražil	Hradec Králové	8
8	(Czech Republic) Jan Hanuš	Jablonec	7
9	(Czech Republic) Tomáš Grigar	Teplice	6
10	(Slovakia) Pavol Bajza	Hradec Králové	5
10	(Czech Republic) Hugo Jan Bačkovský	Liberec	5
10	(Slovakia) Dominik Holec	Karviná	5
10	(Czech Republic) Antonín Kinský	Pardubice	5

== Attendances ==
Rank	Club	Average
1	Slavia Praha	17,688
2	Sparta Praha	17,084
3	Baník Ostrava	9,366
4	Viktoria Plzeň	8,778
5	Hradec Králové	7,303
6	Teplice	5,641
7	Slovácko	5,299
8	Bohemians	4,998
9	Sigma Olomouc	4,540
10	Zlín	3,740
11	Pardubice	3,346
12	České Budějovice	3,335
13	Slovan Liberec	3,092
14	Mladá Boleslav	2,837
15	Karviná	2,686
16	Jablonec	2,342

== See also ==
- 2023–24 Czech National Football League
- 2023–24 Czech Cup
