= 2022–23 AC Sparta Prague season =

Sparta Prague
2022–23 season
- President: Daniel Křetínský
- Head coach: Brian Priske
- Stadium: Stadion Letná
- Czech First League: 1st
- Czech Cup: Runners-up
- UEFA Europa Conference League: Second qualifying round
- Top goalscorer: League: Jan Kuchta (14); All: Jan Kuchta (16)
Home colours	Away colours

The 2022–23 season was the 130th in the history of AC Sparta Prague and their 30th consecutive season in the top flight. The club will participate in the Czech First League, the Czech Cup, and the UEFA Europa Conference League.

== Players ==
As of 10 September 2022

Note: Flags indicate national team as defined under FIFA eligibility rules; some limited exceptions apply. Players may hold more than one non-FIFA nationality.

No.	Pos.	Nation	Player
1	GK	CZE	Matěj Kovář (on loan from Manchester United)
2	DF	CZE	Martin Suchomel
3	DF	CZE	Ondřej Čelůstka
4	DF	CZE	Patrik Vydra
7	FW	CZE	Tomáš Čvančara
8	MF	CZE	David Pavelka
9	FW	CZE	Jan Kuchta (on loan from Lokomotiv Moscow)
10	MF	CZE	Adam Karabec
11	MF	BUL	Martin Minchev
13	MF	CZE	Kryštof Daněk
15	MF	CZE	Jakub Jankto (on loan from Getafe)
16	MF	CZE	Michal Sáček
17	DF	DEN	Casper Højer Nielsen
18	MF	CZE	Lukáš Sadílek
19	DF	CZE	Jan Mejdr

No.	Pos.	Nation	Player
21	MF	CZE	Jakub Pešek
22	MF	SVK	Lukáš Haraslín
24	GK	CZE	Vojtěch Vorel
25	DF	DEN	Asger Sørensen
26	MF	CZE	Jan Fortelný
27	DF	CZE	Filip Panák
28	DF	CZE	Tomáš Wiesner
29	GK	CZE	Milan Heča
30	DF	CZE	Jaroslav Zelený
32	DF	NOR	Andreas Vindheim
37	MF	CZE	Ladislav Krejčí (captain)
39	FW	CZE	Lukáš Juliš
41	DF	CZE	Martin Vitík
77	GK	SVK	Dominik Holec
—	GK	ROU	Florin Niță

=== Out on loan ===
Note: Flags indicate national team as defined under FIFA eligibility rules; some limited exceptions apply. Players may hold more than one non-FIFA nationality.

No.	Pos.	Nation	Player
—	DF	CZE	Matěj Hanousek (at Gaziantep)
—	GK	CZE	Hugo Jan Bačkovský (at Bohemians 1905)
—	FW	CZE	Václav Drchal (at Bohemians 1905)
—	DF	CZE	Dominik Plechatý (at Slovan Liberec)
—	FW	CZE	Matyáš Kozák (at Slovan Liberec)
—	MF	CZE	Matěj Polidar (at Jablonec)
—	FW	CZE	Václav Sejk (at Jablonec)

No.	Pos.	Nation	Player
—	MF	CZE	Matěj Ryneš (at Hradec Králové)
—	MF	CZE	Filip Souček (at Zbrojovka Brno)
—	MF	CZE	Michal Trávník (at Slovácko)
—	GK	CZE	František Kotek (at Táborsko)
—	GK	CZE	Jan Čtvrtečka (at Dukla Prague)
—	MF	CZE	Filip Havelka (at Dukla Prague)
—	FW	CZE	Vojtěch Patrák (at Jablonec)

=== Other players under contract ===
Note: Flags indicate national team as defined under FIFA eligibility rules; some limited exceptions apply. Players may hold more than one non-FIFA nationality.

No.	Pos.	Nation	Player
—	MF	CZE	Ladislav Krejčí

== Pre-season and friendlies ==
Win Draw Loss Fixtures

25 June 2022 Friendly	Sparta Prague (Czech Republic)	2–1	(Czech Republic) Dukla Prague	Prague
11:00 CEST (UTC+2)				Stadium: TC Strahov (hřiště č. 1)

30 June 2022 Friendly	Sparta Prague (Czech Republic)	3–0	(Czech Republic) Opava	Prague
11:00 CEST (UTC+2)				Stadium: TC Strahov (hřiště č. 1)

6 July 2022 Friendly	Sparta Prague (Czech Republic)	2–0	(Croatia) Rijeka
CEST (UTC+2)

9 July 2022 Friendly	Wolfsberger AC (Austria)	1–0	(Czech Republic) Sparta Prague	Wolfsberg
15:30 CEST (UTC+2)		Report		Stadium: Lavanttal-Arena

13 July 2022 Friendly	Sparta Prague (Czech Republic)	1–1	(Hungary) Paksi FC	Völkermarkt, Austria
17:00 CEST (UTC+2)				Stadium: Lilienberg-Arena

16 December 2022 Friendly	Sparta Prague (Czech Republic)	3–1	(Slovakia) Žilina	Prague
14:00 CET (UTC+1)				Stadium: TC Strahov (hřiště č. 1)

16 January 2023 Friendly	Red Bull Salzburg (Austria)	2–1	(Czech Republic) Sparta Prague
16:00 CET (UTC+1)		Report

21 January 2023 Friendly	Sparta Prague (Czech Republic)	3–1	(Germany) 1. FC Nürnberg	Prague
14:00 CET (UTC+1)		Report		Stadium: Stadion Letná

== Competitions ==
=== Overall record ===
Competition	First match	Last match	Starting round	Final position	Record							
Competition	First match	Last match	Starting round	Final position	Pld	W	D	L	GF	GA	GD	Win %
Czech First League	30 July 2022	May 2023	Matchday 1		16	9	5	2	30	15	+15	56.25
Czech Cup	19 October 2022				2	2	0	0	9	3	+6	100.00
UEFA Europa Conference League	21 July 2022	28 July 2022	Second qualifying round	Second qualifying round	2	0	1	1	1	2	−1	0.00
Total					20	11	6	3	40	20	+20	55.00

Last updated: 19 November 2022
Source: Soccerway

=== Czech First League ===
==== League table ====
Pos	Team	Pld	W	D	L	GF	GA	GD	Pts	Qualification or relegation
1	Sparta Prague	30	20	8	2	70	29	+41	68	Qualification for the championship group
2	Slavia Prague	30	20	6	4	81	25	+56	66	Qualification for the championship group
3	Viktoria Plzeň	30	17	6	7	55	29	+26	57	Qualification for the championship group
4	Bohemians 1905	30	14	6	10	53	49	+4	48	Qualification for the championship group
5	Slovácko	30	13	7	10	36	38	−2	46	Qualification for the championship group

Source: Fortuna Liga
Rules for classification: 1) Points; 2) Head-to-head points; 3) Head-to-head goal difference; 4) Head-to-head goals scored; 5) Goal difference; 6) Goals scored; 7) Fair-play ranking; 8) Draw.

Pos	Team	Pld	W	D	L	GF	GA	GD	Pts	Qualification or relegation	SPA	SLA	PLZ	BOH	SLO	OLO
1	Sparta Prague (C)	35	23	9	3	76	33	+43	78	Qualification for the Champions League third qualifying round	—	3–2	0–1	2–1	—	—
2	Slavia Prague	35	24	6	5	98	31	+67	78	Qualification for the Europa League third qualifying round (Note: Slavia Prague qualified for the Europa League as Czech Cup winners.)	—	—	2–1	6–0	4–0	—
3	Viktoria Plzeň	35	18	7	10	60	38	+22	61	Qualification for the Europa Conference League second qualifying round	—	—	—	0–2	2–2	1–3
4	Bohemians 1905	35	15	7	13	56	58	−2	52	Qualification for the Europa Conference League second qualifying round	—	—	—	—	0–0	0–1
5	Slovácko	35	13	11	11	40	46	−6	50		0–0	—	—	—	—	2–2
6	Sigma Olomouc	35	12	12	11	53	47	+6	48		0–1	2–3	—	—	—	—

Source: Fortuna Liga
Legend: Blue = home team win; Yellow = draw; Red = away team win.
Rules for classification: 1) Total points; 2) Points earned in regular season; 3) Head-to-head points (regular season); 4) Head-to-head goal difference (regular season); 5) Head-to-head goals scored (regular season); 5) Goal difference (all matches); 6) Goals scored (all matches); 7) Fair-play ranking; 8) Draw.
(C) Champions
Notes:

Pos	Team	Pld	W	D	L	GF	GA	GD	Pts	Qualification or relegation	OST	TEP	JAB	PCE	ZLN	BRN
11	Baník Ostrava	35	11	9	15	53	50	+3	42		—	2–1	—	2–4	—	4–0
12	Teplice	35	11	9	15	45	67	−22	42		—	—	—	1–0	2–1	1–1
13	Jablonec	35	10	10	15	49	63	−14	40		1–1	0–2	—	—	—	1–0
14	Pardubice (O)	35	11	4	20	38	63	−25	37	Qualification for the relegation play-offs	—	—	2–0	—	1–2	—
15	Trinity Zlín (O)	35	7	13	15	43	60	−17	34	Qualification for the relegation play-offs	2–1	—	1–1	—	—	—
16	Zbrojovka Brno (R)	35	8	9	18	41	64	−23	33	Relegation to FNL	—	—	—	0–2	0–0	—

Source: Fortuna Liga
Legend: Blue = home team win; Yellow = draw; Red = away team win.
Rules for classification: 1) Total points; 2) Points earned in regular season; 3) Head-to-head points (regular season); 4) Head-to-head goal difference (regular season); 5) Head-to-head goals scored (regular season); 5) Goal difference (all matches); 6) Goals scored (all matches); 7) Fair-play ranking; 8) Draw.
(O) Play-off winners; (R) Relegated

==== Results summary ====
Overall								Home						Away					
Pld	W	D	L	GF	GA	GD	Pts	W	D	L	GF	GA	GD	W	D	L	GF	GA	GD
27	18	7	2	64	26	+38	61	9	4	1	34	13	+21	9	3	1	30	13	+17

Last updated: 15 April 2023.
Source: Fortuna Liga

==== Results by round ====
Round	1	2	3	4	5	6	7	8	9	10	11	12	13	14	15	16	17	18	19	20	21	22	23	24	25	26	27	28	29	30
Ground	H	A	H	A	H	A	H	A	H	H	A	H	A	H	A	H	A	H	A	H	A	H	A	A	H	A	H	A	H	A
Result	L	W	W	W	D	D	D	D	D	W	W	W	L	W	W	W	D	W	W	W	W	W	W	W	W	W	D			
Position	12	8	6	2	3	5	4	4	3	3	3	3	3	3	3	3	3	3	3	3	3	3	2	2	2	1	1			

Updated to match(es) played on 15 April 2023. Source: Fortuna Liga
A = Away; H = Home; W = Win; D = Draw; L = Loss

==== Matches ====
The league fixtures were announced on 22 June 2022.

31 July 2022 1	Sparta Prague	1–2	Slovan Liberec	Prague
19:00 CEST (UTC+2)				Stadium: Stadion Letná

7 August 2022 2	České Budějovice	0–2	Sparta Prague	České Budějovice
16:00 CEST (UTC+2)				Stadium: Stadion Střelecký ostrov

14 August 2022 3	Sparta Prague	2–0	Sigma Olomouc	Prague
19:00 CEST (UTC+2)				Stadium: Stadion Letná

20 August 2022 4	Mladá Boleslav	1–3	Sparta Prague	Mladá Boleslav
19:00 CEST (UTC+2)				Stadium: Lokotrans Aréna

27 August 2022 5	Sparta Prague	1–1	Bohemians 1905	Prague
19:00 CEST (UTC+2)				Stadium: Stadion Letná

30 August 2022 6	Jablonec	1–1	Sparta Prague	Jablonec nad Nisou
20:00 CEST (UTC+2)				Stadium: Stadion Střelnice

3 September 2022 7	Sparta Prague	0–0	Trinity Zlín	Prague
19:00 CEST (UTC+2)				Stadium: Stadion Letná

10 September 2022 8	Teplice	2–2	Sparta Prague	Teplice
19:00 CEST (UTC+2)				Stadium: Na Stínadlech

17 September 2022 9	Sparta Prague	1–1	Baník Ostrava	Prague
19:00 CEST (UTC+2)				Stadium: Stadion Letná

1 October 2022 10	Sparta Prague	2–1	Hradec Králové	Prague
19:00 CEST (UTC+2)				Stadium: Stadion Letná

8 October 2022 11	Zbrojovka Brno	0–4	Sparta Prague	Brno
16:00 CEST (UTC+2)				Stadium: Wedos Arena

15 October 2022 12	Sparta Prague	5–2	Pardubice	Prague
19:00 CEST (UTC+2)				Stadium: Stadion Letná

23 October 2022 13	Slavia Prague	4–0	Sparta Prague	Prague
19:00 CEST (UTC+2)				Stadium: Fortuna Arena

5 November 2022 15	Viktoria Plzeň	0–1	Sparta Prague	Plzeň
18:00 CET (UTC+1)				Stadium: Doosan Arena

9 November 2022 14	Sparta Prague	4–0	Slovácko	Prague
19:30 CET (UTC+1)				Stadium: Stadion Letná

12 November 2022 16	Sparta Prague	1–0	České Budějovice	Prague
18:00 CET (UTC+1)				Stadium: Stadion Letná

28 January 2023 17	Sigma Olomouc	1–1	Sparta Prague	Olomouc
18:00 CET (UTC+1)	Navrátil 45+1'; Jakub Trefil (yellow card) 90+3'; Pavel Zifčák (yellow card) 90+9'; Vraštil (yellow card) 90+10'	Report	Čvančara 10'; Haraslín (yellow card) 43'; Patrik Vydra (yellow card) 74'	Stadium: Andrův stadion Attendance: 7,126; Referee: (Czech Republic) Miroslav Zelinka

5 February 2023 18	Sparta Prague	4–1	Mladá Boleslav	Prague
18:00 CET (UTC+1)	Kairinen 6' (yellow card) 45'; Krejčí 36' (pen.); Kuchta (yellow card) 55'; Minchev 82' 90+5'	Report	Tomič 3' (yellow card) 35'; Matějovský (yellow card) 58'	Stadium: Stadion Letná; Attendance: 10,333; Referee: (Czech Republic) Petr Hocek

=== Czech Cup ===
19 October 2022 Third Round	Jiskra Domažlice	1–6	Sparta Prague	Domažlice
15:00 CET				Stadium: Městský stadion Střelnice; Attendance: 3,114

19 November 2022 Round of 16	Baník Ostrava	2–3	Sparta Prague	Ostrava
15:00 CET				Stadium: Městský stadion Attendance: 14,185

=== UEFA Europa Conference League ===
==== Second qualifying round ====
The draw for the second qualifying round was made on 15 June 2022.

21 July 2022 First leg	Sparta Prague (Czech Republic)	0–0	(Norway) Viking	Prague, Czech Republic
19:00 CEST (UTC+2)		Report		Stadium: Stadion Letná; Attendance: 12,667; Referee: Manfredas Lukjančukas (Lithuania)

28 July 2022 Second leg	Viking (Norway)	2–1 (2–1 agg.)	(Czech Republic) Sparta Prague	Stavanger, Norway
19:00 CEST	Vevatne 45'; Traoré 90+2'	Report	Zelený 42'	Stadium: Viking Stadion; Attendance: 8,300; Referee: Visar Kastrati (Kosovo)

=== Appearances and goals ===
No.	Pos	Nat	Player	Total		Czech First League		Czech Cup		Europa Conference League	
No.	Pos	Nat	Player	Apps	Goals	Apps	Goals	Apps	Goals	Apps	Goals
Goalkeepers
1	GK	(Czech Republic) CZE	Matěj Kovář	32	0	28	0	4	0	0	0
24	GK	(Czech Republic) CZE	Vojtěch Vorel	1	0	0	0	1	0	0	0
77	GK	(Slovakia) SVK	Dominik Holec	9	0	7	0	0	0	2	0
Defenders
3	DF	(Czech Republic) CZE	Ondřej Čelůstka	1	0	0+1	0	0	0	0	0
4	DF	(Czech Republic) CZE	Patrik Vydra	5	0	4+1	0	0	0	0	0
5	DF	(Serbia) SRB	Dimitrije Kamenović	2	0	0+2	0	0	0	0	0
17	DF	(Denmark) DEN	Casper Højer Nielsen	23	2	14+7	2	0+2	0	0	0
19	DF	(Czech Republic) CZE	Jan Mejdr	32	0	17+9	0	4	0	1+1	0
25	DF	(Denmark) DEN	Asger Sørensen	36	5	32	5	2+1	0	1	0
27	DF	(Czech Republic) CZE	Filip Panák	20	0	12+3	0	5	0	0	0
28	DF	(Czech Republic) CZE	Tomáš Wiesner	32	3	18+10	3	1+1	0	2	0
30	DF	(Czech Republic) CZE	Jaroslav Zelený	41	3	30+4	1	5	1	2	1
33	DF	(Slovakia) SVK	Dávid Hancko	5	0	3	0	0	0	2	0
41	DF	(Czech Republic) CZE	Martin Vitík	27	2	21+1	0	5	2	0	0
42	DF	(Czech Republic) CZE	Ondřej Kukučka	1	0	0	0	0+1	0	0	0
Midfielders
5	MF	(Czech Republic) CZE	Matěj Ryneš	1	0	0	0	0	0	0+1	0
6	MF	(Finland) FIN	Kaan Kairinen	18	1	14+1	1	3	0	0	0
8	MF	(Czech Republic) CZE	David Pavelka	21	1	13+5	1	2+1	0	0	0
10	MF	(Czech Republic) CZE	Adam Karabec	28	2	9+14	2	2+1	0	2	0
11	MF	(Bulgaria) BUL	Martin Minchev	35	7	7+22	5	4	2	0+2	0
13	MF	(Czech Republic) CZE	Kryštof Daněk	33	2	12+15	2	2+2	0	0+2	0
15	MF	(Czech Republic) CZE	Jakub Jankto	16	1	8+7	1	0+1	0	0	0
16	MF	(Czech Republic) CZE	Michal Sáček	7	0	0+5	0	1	0	0+1	0
18	MF	(Czech Republic) CZE	Lukáš Sadílek	40	4	31+3	3	3+1	1	2	0
20	MF	(Albania) ALB	Qazim Laçi	20	0	7+10	0	1+2	0	0	0
21	MF	(Czech Republic) CZE	Jakub Pešek	5	0	3	0	0	0	2	0
22	MF	(Slovakia) SVK	Lukáš Haraslín	28	8	21+1	7	4	1	2	0
26	MF	(Czech Republic) CZE	Jan Fortelný	8	0	1+4	0	0+1	0	2	0
34	MF	(Czech Republic) CZE	Daniel Kaštánek	2	0	0+2	0	0	0	0	0
37	MF	(Czech Republic) CZE	Ladislav Krejčí	21	13	19	13	2	0	0	0
Forwards
7	FW	(Czech Republic) CZE	Tomáš Čvančara	30	15	20+4	12	2+2	3	0+2	0
9	FW	(Czech Republic) CZE	Jan Kuchta	35	16	29	14	2+2	2	2	0
14	FW	(Czech Republic) CZE	Václav Drchal	4	0	0+4	0	0	0	0	0
36	FW	(Czech Republic) CZE	Tomáš Schánělec	2	0	0+2	0	0	0	0	0
39	FW	(Czech Republic) CZE	Lukáš Juliš	9	1	4+4	1	0+1	0	0	0
45	FW	(Australia) AUS	Awer Mabil	16	2	1+13	2	0+2	0	0	0
48	FW	(Slovakia) SVK	Adam Goljan	4	0	0+2	0	0+2	0	0	0
