= 2020–21 AC Sparta Prague season =

Sparta Prague
2020–21 season
- President: Daniel Křetínský
- Head coach: Václav Kotal
- Stadium: Generali Arena
- Czech First League: 2nd
- Czech Cup: Semi-finals
- UEFA Europa League: Group stage
- Top goalscorer: League: Adam Hlozek (15); All: Lukáš Juliš (17)
Home colours	Away colours

The 2020–21 AC Sparta Prague season was the club's 126th season in existence and the 28th consecutive season in the top flight of Czech football. In addition to the domestic league, AC Sparta Prague participated in this season's editions of the Czech Cup and the UEFA Europa League. The season covered the period from 1 August 2020 to 30 June 2021.

== Players ==
=== First-team squad ===
As of 21 January 2021.

Note: Flags indicate national team as defined under FIFA eligibility rules; some limited exceptions apply. Players may hold more than one non-FIFA nationality.

No.	Pos.	Nation	Player
1	GK	ROU	Florin Niță
3	DF	CZE	Ondřej Čelůstka
5	DF	CZE	Dominik Plechatý
6	MF	CZE	Filip Souček
7	MF	SWE	David Moberg Karlsson
8	MF	CZE	David Pavelka
9	MF	CZE	Ladislav Krejčí
10	MF	CZE	Bořek Dočkal (captain)
11	MF	BUL	Martin Minchev
13	DF	CZE	David Lischka
15	DF	CZE	Matěj Hanousek
16	MF	CZE	Michal Sáček
18	FW	CZE	Libor Kozák
19	DF	SVK	Lukáš Štetina

No.	Pos.	Nation	Player
20	FW	CZE	Adam Hložek
22	MF	SRB	Srđan Plavšić
24	MF	CZE	Matěj Polidar
25	MF	CZE	Michal Trávník
28	DF	CZE	Tomáš Wiesner
29	GK	CZE	Milan Heča
32	DF	NOR	Andreas Vindheim
33	DF	SVK	Dávid Hancko (on loan from Fiorentina)
36	MF	CZE	Adam Karabec
37	MF	CZE	Ladislav Krejčí II
39	FW	CZE	Lukáš Juliš
40	GK	CZE	František Kotek
41	DF	CZE	Martin Vitík

=== Out on loan ===
Note: Flags indicate national team as defined under FIFA eligibility rules; some limited exceptions apply. Players may hold more than one non-FIFA nationality.

No.	Pos.	Nation	Player
—	FW	GHA	Benjamin Tetteh (at Yeni Malatyaspor)
—	GK	SVK	Dominik Holec (at Raków Częstochowa)
—	GK	CZE	Hugo Jan Bačkovský (at Bohemians 1905)
—	FW	CZE	Matěj Pulkrab (at Bohemians 1905)
—	MF	CZE	Jiří Kulhánek (at SFC Opava)
—	FW	CZE	Václav Drchal (at Mladá Boleslav)

No.	Pos.	Nation	Player
—	MF	CZE	Filip Havelka (at České Budějovice)
—	GK	CZE	Jan Čtvrtečka (at FK Teplice)
—	DF	CZE	Lukáš Hušek (at Viktoria Žižkov)
—	DF	CZE	Daniel Horák (at Vysočina Jihlava)
—	FW	CZE	Vojtěch Patrák (at Vysočina Jihlava)
—	MF	CZE	Jan Fortelný (at Teplice)
—	DF	SRB	Uroš Radaković (at Wisła Kraków)

=== Other players under contract ===
Note: Flags indicate national team as defined under FIFA eligibility rules; some limited exceptions apply. Players may hold more than one non-FIFA nationality.

No.	Pos.	Nation	Player
—	DF	CZE	Ondřej Zahustel

== Pre-season and friendlies ==
Win Draw Loss

1 August 2020 Friendly	Sparta Prague (Czech Republic)	5–0	(Czech Republic) Táborsko	Prague, Czech Republic
18:00 CEST (UTC+2)				Stadium: Tréninkové centrum mládeže Strahov

6 August 2020 Friendly	Gorica (Slovenia)	1–3	(Czech Republic) Sparta Prague	Bled, Slovenia
16:00 CEST (UTC+2)				Stadium: Športni park Bledec

12 August 2020 Friendly	Sparta Prague (Czech Republic)	2–2	(Austria) Wolfsberger AC	Bad Kleinkirchheim, Austria
15:00 CEST (UTC+2)				Stadium: Sportarena Bad Kleinkirchheim

12 August 2020 Friendly	SV Horn (Austria)	0–4	(Czech Republic) Sparta Prague	Bad Kleinkirchheim, Austria
19:00 CEST (UTC+2)				Stadium: Sportarena Bad Kleinkirchheim

3 September 2020 Friendly	Sparta Prague (Czech Republic)	1–2	(Czech Republic) Bohemians 1905	Prague, Czech Republic
18:00 CEST (UTC+2)				Stadium: Stadion Letná

9 September 2020 Friendly	Sparta Prague (Czech Republic)	1–3	(Czech Republic) Viktoria Žižkov	Prague, Czech Republic
12:00 CEST (UTC+2)	Hložek 46'		Sixta 14'; Pázler 30'; Diviš 60'	Stadium: Tréninkové centrum mládeže Strahov

== Competitions ==
=== Overview ===
Competition	First match	Last match	Starting round	Final position	Record							
Competition	First match	Last match	Starting round	Final position	Pld	W	D	L	GF	GA	GD	Win %
Czech First League	22 August 2020	29 May 2021	Matchday 1	2nd	34	23	5	6	82	43	+39	67.65
Czech Cup	30 September 2020	5 May 2021	Third round	Semi-finals	4	3	0	1	7	4	+3	75.00
UEFA Europa League	22 October 2020	10 December 2020	Group stage	Group stage	6	2	0	4	10	12	−2	33.33
Total					44	28	5	11	99	59	+40	63.64

Last updated: 29 May 2021
Source: Soccerway

=== Czech First League ===
==== League table ====
Pos	Team	Pld	W	D	L	GF	GA	GD	Pts	Qualification or relegation
1	Slavia Prague (C)	34	26	8	0	85	20	+65	86	Qualification for the Champions League third qualifying round
2	Sparta Prague	34	23	5	6	82	43	+39	74	Qualification for the Champions League second qualifying round
3	Jablonec	34	21	6	7	59	33	+26	69	Qualification for the Europa League third qualifying round
4	Slovácko	34	19	6	9	58	33	+25	63	Qualification for the Europa Conference League second qualifying round
5	Viktoria Plzeň	34	17	7	10	60	45	+15	58	Qualification for the Europa Conference League second qualifying round

Source: Fortuna Liga
Rules for classification: 1) Points; 2) Head-to-head points; 3) Head-to-head goal difference; 4) Head-to-head goals scored; 5) Goal difference; 6) Goals scored; 7) Fair-play ranking; 8) Draw.
(C) Champions

==== Results summary ====
Overall								Home						Away					
Pld	W	D	L	GF	GA	GD	Pts	W	D	L	GF	GA	GD	W	D	L	GF	GA	GD
34	23	5	6	82	43	+39	74	13	1	3	46	21	+25	10	4	3	36	22	+14

Source: Fortuna Liga

==== Results by round ====
Round	1	2	3	4	5	6	7	8	9	10	11	12	13	14	15	16	17	18	19	20	21	22	23	24	25	26	27	28	29	30	31	32	33	34
Ground	A	H	A	H	A	H	A	H	A	H	A	H	A	H	A	H	H	A	H	A	H	A	H	A	H	A	H	A	H	A	H	A	A	H
Result	W	W	W	W	W	W	L	L	W	L	W	W	W	D	W	W	L	W	W	W	W	L	W	D	W	L	W	D	W	D	W	W	W	W
Position	3	2	1	1	1	1	2	2	2	2	2	2	3	3	3	3	2	2	2	2	2	2	2	2	3	3	3	3	3	3	2	2	2	2

Source: Fortuna Liga
A = Away; H = Home; W = Win; D = Draw; L = Loss

==== Matches ====
22 August 2020 1	Zbrojovka Brno	1–4	Sparta Prague	Brno
19:30 CEST (UTC+2)	Pachlopník (yellow card) 41'; Štepanovský 58'; Černín (yellow card) 71'	Report	Vindheim 4'; Juliš 11'; Čelůstka (yellow card) 16'; Dočkal 30', 35'; Krejčí II (yellow card) 44'; Sáček (yellow card) 68'; Štetina (yellow card) 90'	Stadium: Wedos Arena; Attendance: 2,500; Referee: Pavel Franěk

30 August 2020 2	Sparta Prague	3–0	Sigma Olomouc	Prague
19:00 CEST (UTC+2)	Štetina (yellow card) 18'; Juliš 37', 45'; Kozák 89'	Report	Hála (yellow card) 23'; Greššák (yellow card) 33'; González (yellow card) 62'; Radić (yellow card) 82'	Stadium: Stadion Letná; Attendance: 4,613; Referee: Pavel Orel

13 September 2020 3	Karviná	2–5	Sparta Prague	Karviná
16:30 CEST (UTC+2)	Papadopulos 24'; Lischka 28' (o.g.)	Report	Hložek 41', 56'; Dočkal 45+2' (pen.); Krejčí II 53'; Kozak 82'	Stadium: Městský stadion Attendance: 2,914; Referee: Zbynek Proske

20 September 2020 4	Sparta Prague	3–1	Fastav Zlín	Prague
18:00 CEST (UTC+2)	Lischka (yellow card) 24'; Hložek 50'; Souček (yellow card) 67'; Dočkal (penalty missed); Jiráček 88' (o.g.); Juliš 90+3'	Report	Jawo (yellow card) 3' (yellow-red card); Poznar (yellow card) 18'; Dramé 19'; Procházka (yellow card) 87'	Stadium: Stadion Letná; Attendance: 5,469; Referee: Pavel Rejžek

27 September 2020 5	Příbram	1–3	Sparta Prague	Příbram
18:00 CEST (UTC+2)	Vávra 28'; Pinc (yellow card) 57'; Rezek (yellow card) 86'	Report	Juliš 24'; Krejčí 45'; Krejčí II 69'	Stadium: Na Litavce; Attendance: 1,800; Referee: Miroslav Zelinka

3 October 2020 6	Sparta Prague	2–1	Jablonec	Prague
19:00 CEST (UTC+2)	Juliš 30'; Hložek 34'; Plechatý (yellow card) 67'; Dočkal (yellow card) 90+3'	Report	Štěpánek (yellow card) 41'; Čvančara 76'; Čvančara (yellow card) 79'	Stadium: Stadion Letná; Attendance: 1,931; Referee: Ondřej Pechanec

8 November 2020 7	Viktoria Plzeň	3–1	Sparta Prague	Plzeň
18:15 CET (UTC+1)	Bucha 7'; Čermák (yellow card) 26'; Ondrášek 34'; Hejda 45+1'; Kalvach (yellow card) 74'; Bucha (penalty missed); Káčer (yellow card) 90+1'	Report	Plechatý (yellow card) 16'; Krejčí II (yellow card) 36'; Sáček (yellow card) 57'; Vindheim (yellow card) 81'; Krejčí II 90+3'	Stadium: Doosan Arena; Attendance: 0 Referee: Pavel Franek

22 November 2020 8	Sparta Prague	2–4	Dynamo České Budějovice	Prague
18:30 CET (UTC+1)	Karlsson 33'; Krejčí II 63'; Pavelka (yellow card) 80' (yellow-red card) 90+2'	Report	Mészáros 13'; Čolić (yellow card) 43'; Brandner 57'; Novák (yellow card) 58'; Javorek 64'; Javorek (yellow card) 75'; Brandner (yellow card) 90'	Stadium: Stadion Letná; Attendance: 0 Referee: Pavel Franek

29 November 2020 9	Teplice	0–1	Sparta Prague	Teplice
16:00 CET (UTC+1)	Jukl (yellow card) 47'; Radosta (yellow card) 61'	Report	Juliš 65'; Souček (yellow card) 90+3'	Stadium: AGC Arena; Attendance: 0 Referee: Pavel Královec

6 December 2020 10	Sparta Prague	0–3	Slavia Prague	Prague
18:30 CET (UTC+1)	Juliš (penalty missed) 29'; Krejčí II (yellow card) 44'; Pavelka (yellow card) 75'; Souček (yellow card) 86'	Report	Sima 32', 40'; Kúdela (yellow card) 41'; Lingr 53'; Traoré (yellow card) 87'	Stadium: Stadion Letná; Attendance: 0 Referee: Miroslav Zelinka

13 December 2020 11	Slovácko	1–2	Sparta Prague	Slovácko
16:00 CET (UTC+1)	Jurečka 14'; Kliment (yellow card) 37'; Kalabiška (yellow card) 71'	Report	Juliš 16', (yellow card) 90+1'; Karlsson (yellow card) 50'; Pavelka 84'	Stadium: Městský stadion Attendance: 0 Referee: Jan Machálek

16 December 2020 12	Sparta Prague	2–0	Pardubice	Prague
16:00 CET (UTC+1)	Juliš 11'; Pavelka (yellow card) 32'; Čelůstka 81'; Krejčí II (red card) 86'	Report	Cadu (yellow card) 25'; Tischler (yellow card) 89'; Langedijk (yellow card) 90+4'	Stadium: Stadion Letná; Attendance: 0 Referee: Alex Denev

22 December 2020 14	Sparta Prague	1–1	Slovan Liberec	Prague
17:00 CET (UTC+1)	Dočkal (penalty missed) , (yellow card) 62'; Juliš (yellow card) 39', (goal) 48'; Souček (yellow card) 72'; Pavelka (yellow card) 75'	Report	Yusuf (yellow card) 4'; Kacharaba (yellow card) 27'; Mara 33' (pen.); Sadílek (yellow card) 57'	Stadium: Stadion Letná; Attendance: 0 Referee: Emanuel Marek

17 January 2021 15	Baník Ostrava	0–0	Sparta Prague	Ostrava
16:00 CET (UTC+1)	Pokorný (yellow card) 35'; Jánoš (yellow card) 87'	Report	Krejčí (yellow card) 30'; Dočkal (yellow card) 42'	Stadium: Městský stadion Attendance: 0 Referee: Miroslav Zelinka

20 January 2021 13	Opava	0–3	Sparta Prague	Opava
18:00 CET (UTC+1)	Helešic (yellow card) 43'; Březina (yellow card) 71'; Hellebrand (yellow card) 90+1'	Report	Juliš 3'; Vitík (yellow card) 61'; Čvančara 73' (o.g.); Plavšić 90'	Stadium: Stadium Municipal Gardens; Attendance: 0 Referee: Pavel Julinek

24 January 2021 16	Sparta Prague	1–0	Mladá Boleslav	Prague
18:30 CET (UTC+1)	Karlsson 58'; Vitík (yellow card) 68'; Vindheim (yellow card) 86'	Report	Křapka (yellow card) 61'; Matějovský (yellow card) 63'	Stadium: Stadion Letná; Attendance: 0 Referee: Zbynek Proske

30 January 2021 17	Sparta Prague	0–1	Bohemians	Prague
18:30 CET (UTC+1)	Hancko (yellow card) 77'	Report	Necid 13'; Vaníček (yellow card) 37'; Levin (yellow card) 54', (penalty missed); Puškáč (yellow card) 89'	Stadium: Stadion Letná; Attendance: 0 Referee: Karel Hrubeš

7 February 2021 18	Sigma Olomouc	2–3	Sparta Prague	Olomouc
18:30 CET (UTC+1)	Daněk 9'; Hubník (yellow card) 43'; González (yellow card) 64', (penalty missed); Gressak (yellow card) 90+2'	Report	Krejčí 57'; Krejčí II (yellow card) 59'; Karlsson 67', 90+3' (pen.)	Stadium: Andrův stadion Attendance: 0 Referee: Pavel Franek

14 February 2021 19	Sparta Prague	4–3	Karviná	Prague
16:00 CET (UTC+1)	Karlsson 22', 41', 69'; Krejčí 27', (yellow card) 30'; Dočkal (yellow card) 64'; Trávník (red card) 72'; Niță (yellow card) 90+2'	Report	Papadopulos 7', 83'; Tavares (yellow card) 15'; Bolek (yellow card) 8'; Herc 32', (yellow card) 89'; Mendes (yellow card) 34'; Mikuš (yellow card) 74'	Stadium: Stadion Letná; Attendance: 0 Referee: Emanuel Marek

20 February 2021 20	Fastav Zlín	0–3	Sparta Prague	Zlín
16:30 CET (UTC+1)	Jawo (yellow card) 61'	Report	Karabec 20'; Pavelka (yellow card) 28'; Hancko 36' (pen.); Kozák 50', (yellow card) 60'; Vitík (yellow card) 55'; Krejčí II (yellow card) 67'; Krejčí (yellow card) 83'	Stadium: Letná Stadion; Attendance: 0 Referee: Pavel Orel

9 March 2021 21	Sparta Prague	4–0	Příbram	Prague
18:00 CET (UTC+1)	Krejčí II 33', (yellow card) 52'; Kozák 43'; Wiesner (yellow card) 65'; Krejčí (yellow card) 70'; Karabec 83'; Vitík (yellow card) 88'; Mezera 90+2' (o.g.)	Report	Lalkovič (yellow card) 23'; Soldát (yellow card) 42'; Voltr (yellow card) 44'; Cmiljanović (yellow card) 79'	Stadium: Stadion Letná; Attendance: 0 Referee: Pavel Franek

21 March 2021 24	Dynamo České Budějovice	0–0	Sparta Prague	České Budějovice
16:00 CET (UTC+1)	Diop (yellow card) 49'	Report	Niță (yellow card) 45'	Stadium: Stadion Střelecký ostrov Attendance: 0 Referee: Ondrej Berka

3 April 2021 25	Sparta Prague	7–2	Teplice	Prague
18:30 CEST (UTC+2)	Hložek 3'; Krejčí II 13', 24', 29' (pen.); Knapík 53' (o.g.); Polidar 60'; Wiesner 61'	Report	Jukl 21', (yellow card) 28'; Žitný 81'	Stadium: Stadion Letná; Attendance: 0 Referee: Jan Machalek

11 April 2021 26	Slavia Prague	2–0	Sparta Prague	Prague
18:30 CEST (UTC+2)	Stanciu (yellow card) 40'; Holeš 45', (yellow card) 59'; Kuchta (yellow card) 47'; Tecl 81'; Traoré (yellow card) 90+2'	Report	Krejčí II (yellow card) 22'; Dočkal (yellow card) 43'; Vitík (yellow card) 66'; Krejčí (yellow card) 90+3'	Stadium: Sinobo Stadium; Attendance: 0 Referee: Pavel Franek

14 April 2021 22	Jablonec	1–0	Sparta Prague	Jablonec
18:00 CEST (UTC+2)	Kratochvíl (yellow card) 27'; Schranz 87'	Report	Polidar (yellow card) 63'; Plavšić (yellow card) 80'	Stadium: Stadion Střelnice; Attendance: 0 Referee: Karel Hrubeš

18 April 2021 27	Sparta Prague	1–0	Slovácko	Prague
18:30 CEST (UTC+2)	Vitík (yellow card) 68'; Wiesner 69'; Polidar (yellow card) 90+2'; Souček (yellow card) 90+2'	Report	Kliment (yellow card) 53'	Stadium: Stadion Letná; Attendance: 0 Referee: Pavel Julínek

21 April 2021 28	Pardubice	2–2	Sparta Prague	Prague
17:00 CEST (UTC+2)	Ewerton (yellow card) 43'; Jeřábek 49'; Cadu 75' (pen.)	Report	Wiesner 7', (yellow card) 74'; Souček (yellow card) 37'; Hancko 44' (pen.)	Stadium: Ďolíček; Attendance: 0 Referee: Miroslav Zelinka

25 April 2021 29	Sparta Prague	4–2	Opava	Prague
16:00 CEST (UTC+2)	Hložek 16', 53', 74'; Plavšić 26'; Wiesner (yellow card) 60'; Dočkal (yellow card) 87'; Niță (yellow card) 88'	Report	Nešický (yellow card) 11'; Žídek (yellow card) 45+1', (goal) 61'; Smola (yellow card) 73'; Helešic 82'	Stadium: Stadion Letná; Attendance: 0 Referee: Jan Petřík

2 May 2021 30	Slovan Liberec	2–2	Sparta Prague	Liberec
17:00 CEST (UTC+2)	Pešek 30', 51'; Mikula (yellow card) 34'; Sadílek (yellow card) 40'; Rabušic (yellow card) 79'; Faško (yellow card) 88'	Report	Wiesner (yellow card) 41'; Karlsson 67'; Hložek 68'; Pavelka (yellow card) 87'	Stadium: Stadion u Nisy; Attendance: 850; Referee: Pavel Orel

9 May 2021 31	Sparta Prague	3–1	Baník Ostrava	Prague
19:30 CEST (UTC+2)	Polidar (yellow card) 30'; Karlsson 37'; Juliš (yellow card) 54'; Dočkal 79'; Čelůstka (yellow card) 83'; Hložek 88'; Pavelka (yellow card) 90+2'	Report	Šašinka (yellow card) 55'; Buchta 65'; Fleišman (yellow card) 71'; Svozil (yellow card) 74'; Sor (yellow card) 90'	Stadium: Stadion Letná; Attendance: 1,430; Referee: Ondřej Lerch

12 May 2021 23	Sparta Prague	3–1	Viktoria Plzeň	Prague
18:00 CEST (UTC+2)	Hložek 62'; Hancko 85' (pen.); Karabec 90+3'	Report	Brabec 11', (yellow card) 44'; Mihálik (yellow card) 27'; Káčer (yellow card) 67'	Stadium: Stadion Letná; Attendance: 0 Referee: Ondrej Pechanec

16 May 2021 32	Mladá Boleslav	4–5	Sparta Prague	Mladá Boleslav
17:00 CEST (UTC+2)	Škoda 12', 43'; Skalák (yellow card) 22'; Zmrhal 48'; Douděra (yellow card) 75'; Řezník (yellow card) 75'; Šeda (yellow card) 90+1'; Budínský 90+4'	Report	Wiesner 9'; Karlsson 40'; Hancko 54' (pen.), 70'; Souček (yellow card) 57'; Hanousek (yellow card) 75'; Polidar 90+1'	Stadium: Lokotrans Aréna; Attendance: 286; Referee: Ondřej Ginzel

23 May 2021 33	Bohemians	1–2	Sparta Prague	Prague
17:00 CEST (UTC+2)	Puškáč 35'; Dostál (yellow card) 53'; Necid (yellow card) 74'; Hronek (yellow card) 90+2'	Report	Juliš 1'; Pavelka 61'; Wiesner (yellow card) 64'; Souček (yellow card) 78'	Stadium: Ďolíček; Attendance: 734; Referee: Ondrej Berka

29 May 2021 34	Sparta Prague	6–1	Zbrojovka Brno	Prague
17:00 CEST (UTC+2)	Hložek 9' (pen.), 14', 26', 32'; Polidar 30'; Sedlák 42' (o.g.); Vitík (yellow card) 76'	Report	Hladík 5'; Jambor (yellow card) 48'	Stadium: Stadion Letná; Attendance: 2,983; Referee: Jan Machálek

=== Czech Cup ===
30 September 2020 Third round	Sparta Prague	2–0	Blansko	Prague
15:00 CEST (UTC+2)	Trávník (yellow card) 37'; Kozák (penalty missed) 68'; Karlsson 74'; Souček 87'	Report	Ilko (yellow card) 24'; Přerovský (yellow card) 42'; Klusák (yellow card) 67'	Stadium: TCM Strahov; Attendance: 0 Referee: Ondřej Berka

17 March 2021 Fourth round	Sparta Prague	1–0	Baník Ostrava	Prague
16:30 CET (UTC+1)	Plavšić (yellow card) 69'; Hancko 89' (pen.); Heča (yellow card) 90+2'	Report	Fleišman (yellow card) 40'; Kaloč (yellow card) 63' (yellow-red card) 88'	Stadium: Great Strahov Stadium; Attendance: 0 Referee: Pavel Julínek

7 April 2021 Quarter-finals	Sparta Prague	4–1	Jablonec	Prague
15:00 CEST (UTC+2)	Krejčí II 49', 69'; Krejčí 81'; Karlsson 84'	Report	Pleštil (yellow card) 35'; Podaný (yellow card) 45+1'; Schranz 47'	Stadium: Great Strahov Stadium; Attendance: 0 Referee: Zbyněk Proske

5 May 2021 Semi-finals	Sparta Prague	0–3	Slavia Prague	Prague
17:30 CEST (UTC+2)	Vitík (yellow card) 35'; Pavelka (yellow card) 72'; Trávník (yellow card) 77'	Report	Kuchta 25', 53'; Holeš 30', (yellow card) 39'	Stadium: Stadion Letná; Attendance: 0 Referee: Zbyněk Proske

=== UEFA Europa League ===
==== Group stage ====
The group stage draw was held on 2 October 2020.

Pos	Team	Pld	W	D	L	GF	GA	GD	Pts	Qualification	MIL	LOSC	SPP	CEL
1	(Italy) Milan	6	4	1	1	12	7	+5	13	Advance to knockout phase	—	0–3	3–0	4–2
2	(France) Lille	6	3	2	1	14	8	+6	11	Advance to knockout phase	1–1	—	2–1	2–2
3	(Czech Republic) Sparta Prague	6	2	0	4	10	12	−2	6		0–1	1–4	—	4–1
4	(Scotland) Celtic	6	1	1	4	10	19	−9	4		1–3	3–2	1–4	—

Source: UEFA
Rules for classification: Group stage tiebreakers

22 October 2020 1	Sparta Prague (Czech Republic)	1–4	(France) Lille	Prague, Czech Republic
21:00 CEST (UTC+2)	Krejčí (red card) 23'; Dočkal 47'; Heča (yellow card) 53'; Sáček (yellow card) 55'; Dočkal (yellow card) 64'	Report	Botman (yellow card) 31'; Yazıcı 45+1', 60', 75'; Bradarić (yellow card) 45+3'; Sanches (yellow card) 53'; Ikoné 66'; Bamba (yellow card) 74'	Stadium: Stadion Letná; Referee: Duje Strukan (Croatia)

29 October 2020 2	Milan (Italy)	3–0	(Czech Republic) Sparta Prague	Milan, Italy
18:55 CET (UTC+1)	Brahim 24'; Leão 57'; Dalot 67'	Report	Dočkal (yellow card) 28'; Lischka (yellow card) 36'; Pavelka (yellow card) 52'	Stadium: San Siro; Attendance: 0 Referee: Halis Özkahya (Turkey)

5 November 2020 3	Celtic (Scotland)	1–4	(Czech Republic) Sparta Prague	Glasgow, Scotland
21:00 CET (UTC+1)	Griffiths 65'; Christie (yellow card) 75'	Report	Juliš 26', 45', 77'; Pavelka (yellow card) 51'; Sáček (yellow card) 71'; Krejčí 90', (yellow card) 90+2'	Stadium: Celtic Park; Referee: István Kovács (Romania)

26 November 2020 4	Sparta Prague (Czech Republic)	4–1	(Scotland) Celtic	Prague, Czech Republic
18:55 CET (UTC+1)	Hancko 26'; Vindheim (yellow card) 29'; Juliš 38', 80'; Krejčí (yellow card) 57'; Souček (yellow card) 89'; Plavšić 90+4'	Report	Édouard 15'	Stadium: Stadion Letná; Referee: Tobias Stieler (Germany)

3 December 2020 5	Lille (France)	2–1	(Czech Republic) Sparta Prague	Villeneuve-d'Ascq, France
18:55 CET (UTC+1)	Bradarić (yellow card) 50'; André (yellow card) 57'; Yılmaz 80', 84'; Botman (yellow card) 89'	Report	Dočkal (yellow card) 51'; Krejčí II (yellow card) 55'; Čelůstka (yellow card) 62' (yellow-red card) 65'; Krejčí 71', (yellow card) 86'	Stadium: Stade Pierre-Mauroy; Referee: Xavier Estrada Fernández (Spain)

10 December 2020 6	Sparta Prague (Czech Republic)	0–1	(Italy) Milan	Prague, Czech Republic
21:00 CET (UTC+1)	Sáček (yellow card) 15'; Polidar (yellow card) 45'; Plechatý (red card) 77'; Heča (yellow card) 77'	Report	Hauge 23'; Krunić (yellow card) 35'; Maldini (yellow card) 49'; Castillejo (yellow card) 85'	Stadium: Stadion Letná; Referee: Daniel Siebert (Germany)

== Statistics ==
=== Goals ===
Rank	Position	Name	League	Cup	Europa League	Total
1	FW	Lukáš Juliš	11	0	3	14
2	FW	David Karlsson	7	1	0	8
3	DF	Bořek Dočkal	4	0	0	4
3	FW	Adam Hložek	4	0	0	4
5	MF	Ladislav Krejčí II	3	0	0	3
5	FW	Ladislav Krejčí	3	0	1	4
7	FW	Libor Kozák	2	0	0	2
9	DF	Andreas Vindheim	1	0	0	1
9	MF	Petr Jiráček	1	0	0	1
9	MF	Filip Souček	0	1	0	1
9	MF	Srđan Plavšić	1	0	0	1
TOTAL			37	2	4	43

=== Assists ===
Rank	Position	Name	League	Cup	Europa League	Total
1	DF	Andreas Vindheim	3	0	0	3
1	MF	Bořek Dočkal	2	0	1	3
1	MF	David Moberg Karlsson	2	0	1	3
1	FW	Adam Hložek	2	0	1	3
5	MF	Bořek Dočkal	2	0	0	2
5	FW	Ladislav Krejčí	2	0	0	2
7	DF	Dávid Hancko	0	0	1	1
7	DF	David Lischka	1	0	0	1
7	MF	David Pavelka	1	0	0	1
7	MF	Adam Karabec	0	0	1	1
7	MF	Michal Sáček	1	0	0	1
7	MF	Michal Trávník	1	0	0	1
7	FW	Lukáš Juliš	1	0	0	1
TOTAL			16	0	5	21

=== Yellow cards ===
Rank	Position	Name	League	Cup	Europa League	Total
1	MF	Filip Souček	3	0	2	5
1	MF	Bořek Dočkal	2	0	3	5
1	MF	Ladislav Krejčí	1	0	4	5
4	MF	Michal Sáček	2	0	2	4
4	MF	Ladislav Krejčí II	3	0	1	4
6	MF	David Pavelka	1	0	2	3
7	DF	Dominik Plechatý	2	0	0	2
7	DF	Lukáš Štetina	2	0	0	2
7	DF	Andreas Vindheim	1	0	1	2
10	GK	Milan Heča	0	0	1	1
10	DF	Martin Vitík	1	0	0	1
10	DF	Ondřej Čelůstka	1	0	0	1
10	DF	David Lischka	1	0	0	1
10	MF	Michal Trávník	0	1	0	1
TOTAL			20	1	16	41

=== Red cards ===
Rank	Position	Name	League	Cup	Europa League	Total
1	MF	Čelůstka	0	0	1	1
1	MF	Ladislav Krejčí	0	0	1	1
1	FW	Lamin Jawo	1	0	0	1
TOTAL			1	0	2	3
