= Ladislav Krejčí (footballer, born 1999) =

Czech footballer

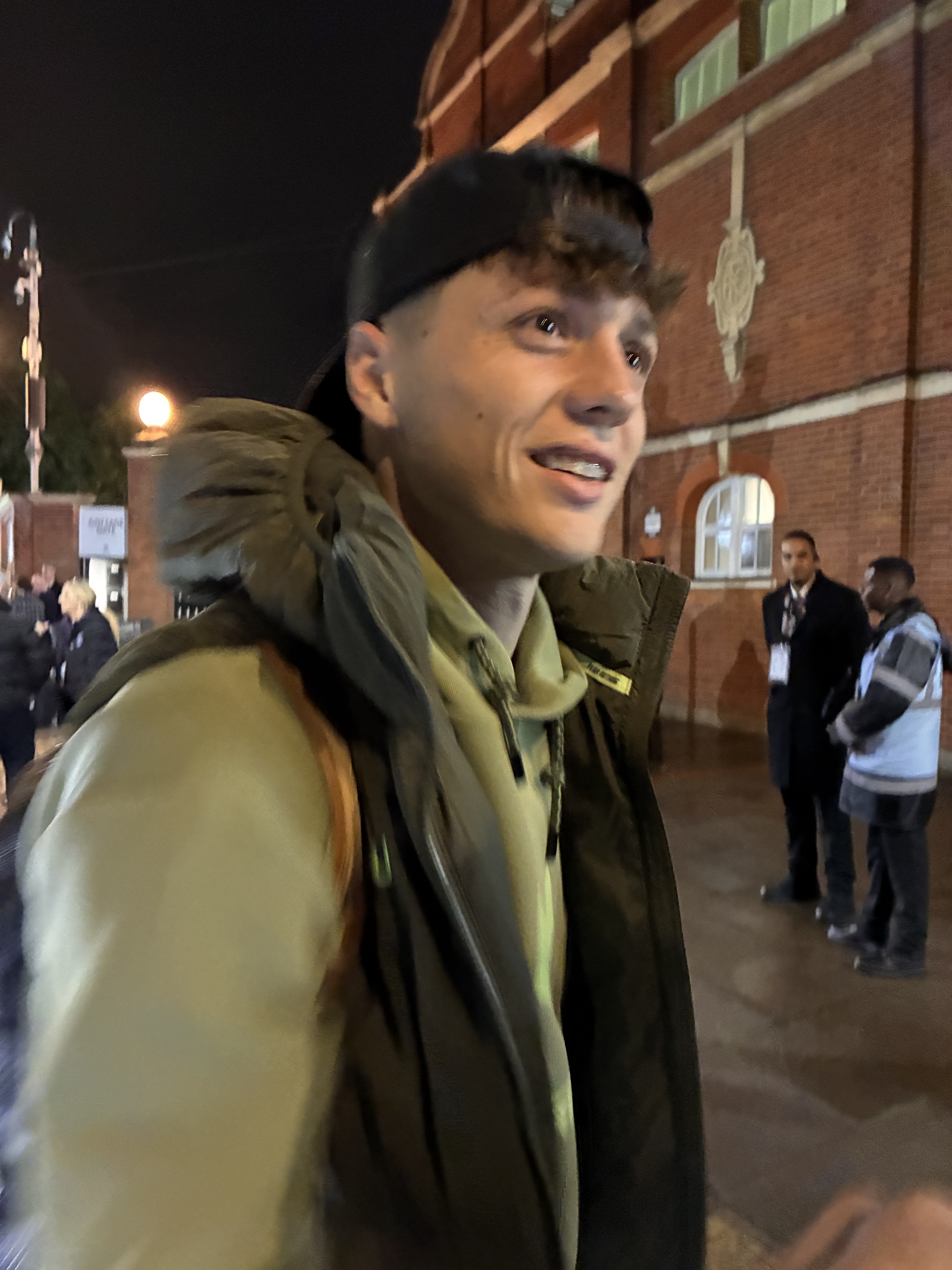
- Krejčí in 2025

Personal information
- Full name: Ladislav Krejčí
- Date of birth: 20 April 1999 (age 27)
- Place of birth: Rosice, Czech Republic
- Height: 1.91 m (6 ft 3 in)
- Positions: Centre-back; defensive midfielder

Team information
- Current team: Wolverhampton Wanderers
- Number: 37

Youth career
- 2006−2008: Slovan Rosice
- 2008−2011: Zbrojovka Brno
- 2011−2012: Slovan Rosice
- 2012−2016: Zbrojovka Brno

Senior career*
Years	Team	Apps	(Gls)
2016−2019	Zbrojovka Brno	47	(4)
2019–2024	Sparta Prague	109	(34)
2024–2026	Girona	30	(2)
2025–2026	→ Wolverhampton Wanderers (loan)	28	(2)
2026–	Wolverhampton Wanderers	5	(1)

International career^{‡}
2014	Czech Republic U16	4	(0)
2016–2017	Czech Republic U18	13	(2)
2017–2018	Czech Republic U19	14	(1)
2018	Czech Republic U20	3	(0)
2019–2021	Czech Republic U21	12	(5)
2022–	Czech Republic	33	(6)
- * Club domestic league appearances and goals as of 04:45, 21 October 2026 (UTC) ‡ National team caps and goals as of 12 November 2026

Ladislav Krejčí (born 20 April 1999) is a Czech professional footballer who plays as a centre-back or defensive midfielder for EFL Championship club Wolverhampton Wanderers, and captains the Czech Republic national team.

In 2024, the Czech edition of Forbes featured Krejčí in their 30 under 30 list: 30 of the most talented Czechs under 30 years old.

== Club career ==
=== Zbrojovka Brno ===
Krejčí made his professional debut for Zbrojovka Brno in its home match against Sparta Prague on 2 October 2016, which ended in a 3–3 draw. He scored his first league goal on 13 May 2018 in Brno's 4–1 win at Teplice.

=== Sparta Prague ===
On 6 June 2019, Krejčí signed a four-year contract with Sparta Prague. In July 2022, he became Sparta's captain, replacing Bořek Dočkal who had retired the previous season.

In May 2023, Krejčí helped the club to win its first championship title since 2014 as captain. He was awarded as the midfielder and player of the 2022–23 season by the League Football Association.

On 10 March 2024, Krejčí received his fifth red card in Sparta Prague jersey (in 4–0 away loss against Viktoria Plzeň) and set the new record for most received red cards in Sparta Prague history in the league competition since 1954, surpassing Jiří Homola with four red cards. In May that year, he helped the club to win its second championship title in two seasons, and domestic cup as captain.

=== Girona ===
On 14 June 2024, Krejčí signed a five-year contract with Spanish side Girona.

==== Loan to Wolverhampton Wanderers ====
On 28 August 2025, Krejčí joined Premier League club Wolverhampton Wanderers on an initial season-long loan deal, joining on a four-year deal for a £26 million fee should certain clauses be met over the duration of the loan. The move saw him become the first Czech player in the club's history.

== International career ==
In March 2022, Krejčí received his first Czech senior call-up from coach Jaroslav Šilhavý.

In the UEFA Euro 2024 qualifying match on 24 March 2023 against Poland, Krejčí scored his first goal which is considered to be the fastest in the Czech Republic national football team history. On 17 June 2023, he scored another goal against Faroe Islands resulting in a 3–0 victory. On 28 May 2024, he was named in the 26-man squad for the UEFA Euro 2024.

On 23 March 2026, Krejčí was confirmed as the new captain of the Czech Republic, after Tomáš Souček's earlier dismissal.

Krejčí proceeded to score in both matches of his nation's 2026 FIFA World Cup playoff path against the Republic of Ireland and Denmark, in addition to taking penalties in the resulting shootouts as both ties ended in draws, scoring against the former and missing against the latter as the Czech Republic qualified for the tournament for the first time since 2006.

On 31 May 2026, Krejčí was selected in the 26-man squad for the 2026 FIFA World Cup.. Against South Korea, Czechia's first World Cup game in 20 years, he scored Czechia's only goal in a 2-1 defeat from a Vladimír Coufal long throw-in.

== Career statistics ==
=== Style of play ===
Krejčí is known for his ball-playing ability, his high aggression and his physical prowess in the air. He also has a good instinct in front of goals, resulting in many goals from corners, set-pieces and long throw-ins.

=== Club ===
As of match played 20 October 2026

Appearances and goals by club, season and competition
Club	Season	League			National cup (Note: Includes Czech Cup, Copa del Rey, FA Cup)		League cup (Note: Includes EFL Cup)		Europe		Total	
Club	Season	Division	Apps	Goals	Apps	Goals	Apps	Goals	Apps	Goals	Apps	Goals
Zbrojovka Brno	2016–17	Czech First League	13	0	2	0	—		—		15	0
Zbrojovka Brno	2017–18	Czech First League	11	1	0	0	—		—		11	1
Zbrojovka Brno	2018–19	Czech National League	23	3	3	0	—		—		26	3
Zbrojovka Brno	Total		47	4	5	0	—		—		52	4
Sparta Prague	2019–20	Czech First League	23	0	4	0	—		2 (Note: Appearances in UEFA Europa League)	0	29	0
Sparta Prague	2020–21	Czech First League	20	8	3	2	—		5	1	28	11
Sparta Prague	2021–22	Czech First League	21	5	3	2	—		7 (Note: Two appearances and one goal in UEFA Champions League, four appearances and one goal in UEFA Europa League, one appearance in UEFA Europa Conference League)	2	31	9
Sparta Prague	2022–23	Czech First League	19	13	2	0	—		—		21	13
Sparta Prague	2023–24	Czech First League	26	8	2	0	—		11 (Note: Two appearances in UEFA Champions League, nine appearances and three goals in UEFA Europa League)	3	39	11
Sparta Prague	Total		109	34	14	4	—		25	6	148	44
Girona	2024–25	La Liga	28	2	1	0	—		7 (Note: Appearances in UEFA Champions League)	0	36	2
Girona	2025–26	La Liga	2	0	—		—		—		2	0
Girona	Total		30	2	1	0	—		7	0	38	2
Wolverhampton Wanderers (loan)	2025–26	Premier League	28	2	2	0	2	0	—		32	2
Wolverhampton Wanderers	2026–27	Championship	5	1	0	0	1	0	—		6	1
Career total			219	43	22	4	3	0	32	6	276	53

=== International ===
As of match played 12 November 2026

Appearances and goals by national team and year
National team	Year	Apps	Goals
Czech Republic	2022	2	0
Czech Republic	2023	5	2
Czech Republic	2024	9	1
Czech Republic	2025	7	0
Czech Republic	2026	10	3
Total		33	6

Scores and results list the Czech Republic's goal tally first, score column indicates score after each Krejčí goal.

List of international goals scored by Ladislav Krejčí
No.	Date	Venue	Cap	Opponent	Score	Result	Competition
1	24 March 2023	Fortuna Arena, Prague, Czech Republic	3	Poland	1–0	3–1	UEFA Euro 2024 qualifying
2	17 June 2023	Tórsvøllur, Tórshavn, Faroe Islands	4	Faroe Islands	1–0	3–0	UEFA Euro 2024 qualifying
3	26 March 2024	Stadion Letná, Prague, Czech Republic	9	Armenia	1–1	2–1	Friendly
4	26 March 2026	Fortuna Arena, Prague, Czech Republic	24	Republic of Ireland	2–2	2–2 (a.e.t.) (4–3 p)	2026 FIFA World Cup qualification
5	31 March 2026	Stadion Letná, Prague, Czech Republic	25	Denmark	2–1	2–2 (a.e.t.) (3–1 p)	2026 FIFA World Cup qualification
6	11 June 2026	Estadio Akron, Zapopan, Mexico	28	South Korea	1–0	1–2	2026 FIFA World Cup

== Honours ==
Sparta Prague

- Czech Cup: 2019–20, 2023–24
- Czech First League: 2022–23, 2023–24

Individual

- La Liga Goal of the Month: December 2024
- Forbes Czech 30 Under 30: 2024.
