= David Pavelka =

Czech footballer

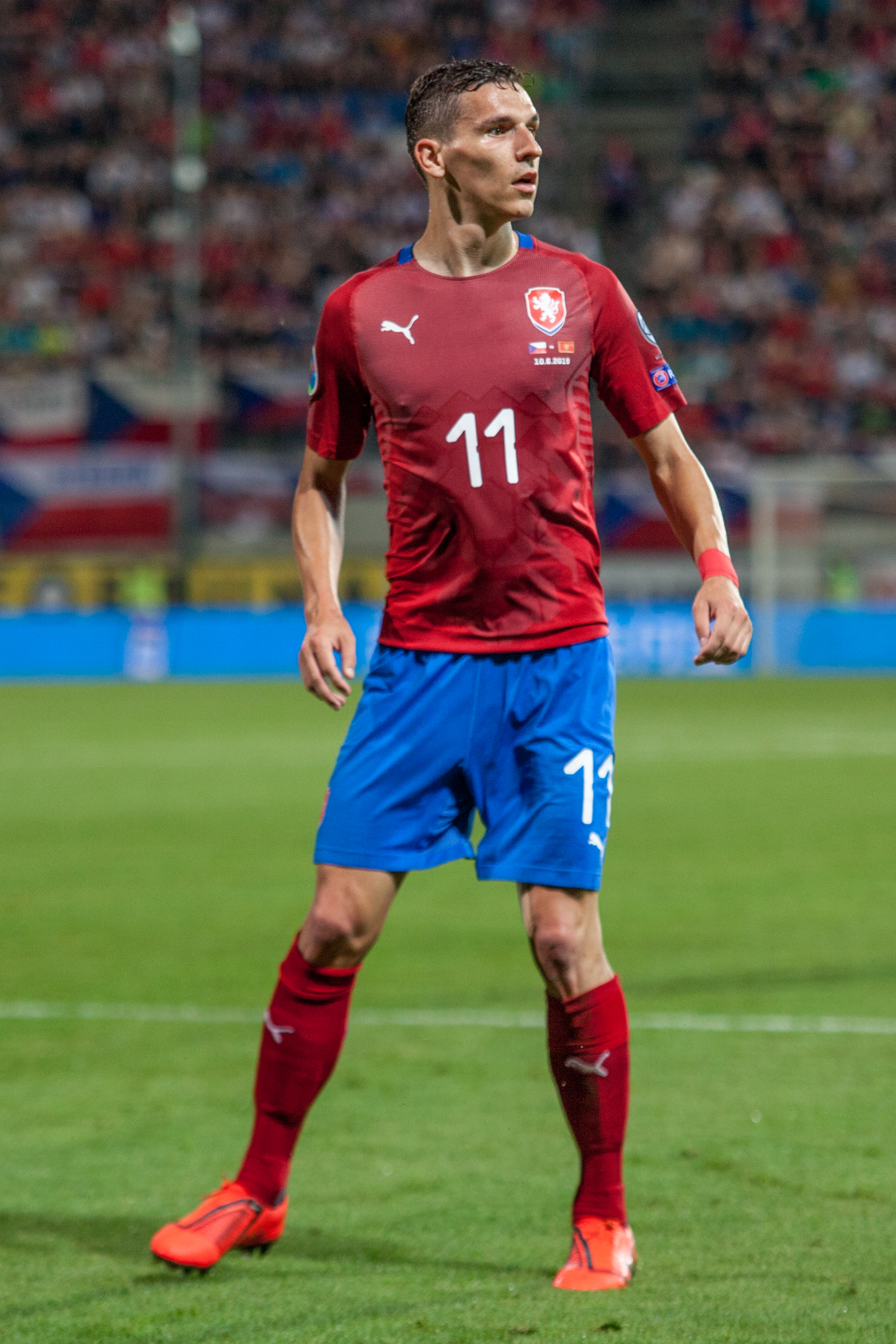
- Pavelka with the Czech Republic in 2019

Personal information
- Date of birth: 18 May 1991 (age 35)
- Place of birth: Prague, Czechoslovakia
- Height: 1.84 m (6 ft 0 in)
- Position: Midfielder

Youth career
- Sparta Prague

Senior career*
Years	Team	Apps	(Gls)
2011–2013	Sparta Prague	10	(1)
2011–2012	→ Slovácko (loan)	22	(4)
2013–2016	Slovan Liberec	76	(15)
2016–2020	Kasımpaşa	108	(3)
2020–2025	Sparta Prague	82	(8)
2025	Sparta Prague B	11	(0)
Total		319	(31)

International career
2012	Czech Republic U21	5	(0)
2015–2021	Czech Republic	25	(1)
- * Club domestic league appearances and goals

David Pavelka (born 18 May 1991) is a Czech former professional footballer who played as a midfielder.

== Club career ==
=== First spell at Sparta ===
Pavelka started his career with Sparta Prague, from where he joined 1. FC Slovácko on loan in 2011. Two days after his loan was announced, he scored his first Slovácko goal in a 1–1 draw with Sigma Olomouc.

=== Liberec ===
At the start of 2013 Pavelka transferred from Sparta Prague to Slovan Liberec, as part of a deal involving Lukáš Vácha moving in the opposite direction. After the 2014–15 Czech Cup final finished without a winner on 27 May 2015, Pavelka took Liberec's first penalty in the shoot-out and converted his spot-kick as his club defeated Jablonec 3–1 to win the trophy.

=== Playing abroad ===
On 19 January 2016, Pavelka moved abroad for the first time, joining Süper Lig football club Kasımpaşa in a transfer worth a reported $1.65 million. He signed a contract until the end of the 2017–18 season.

=== Return to Sparta ===
On 6 October 2020, Pavelka returned to his native country, signing for Sparta Prague in the Czech First League. In one of his first games after returning, he received a red card on 22 November, in a 4–2 home loss against České Budějovice.

On 3 January 2025, it was decided that Pavelka would move to Sparta Prague B, where he would mentor the young players.

== International career ==
On 3 September 2015, Pavelka debuted as a starter in the Czech senior squad in a UEFA Euro 2016 qualifying against Kazakhstan, ending in a 2–1 victory for the Czechs. He was eventually selected to represent the Czech Republic at the final tournament held in France.

With the arrival of Jaroslav Šilhavý to the national team in 2018, Pavelka played all the minutes in the three remaining matches of the 2018–19 UEFA Nations League as well as a friendly match against Poland, becoming a key player of the entire team.

Pavelka scored his first national team goal in a friendly match against Brazil on 26 March 2019.

== Career statistics ==
=== Club ===
Appearances and goals by club, season and competition
Club	Season	League			National cup (Note: Includes Czech Cup, Turkish Cup)		Europe		Other		Total	
Club	Season	Division	Apps	Goals	Apps	Goals	Apps	Goals	Apps	Goals	Apps	Goals
Sparta Prague	2010–11	Czech First League	3	0	–		–		–		3	0
Sparta Prague	2012–13	Czech First League	7	1	–		3 (Note: Appearances in UEFA Europa League)	0	–		10	1
Sparta Prague	Total		10	1	0	0	3	0	0	0	13	1
Slovácko (loan)	2011–12	Czech First League	22	4	2	0	–		–		24	4
Slovan Liberec	2012–13	Czech First League	13	2	4	1	–		–		17	3
Slovan Liberec	2013–14	Czech First League	29	8	1	0	14	1	–		44	9
Slovan Liberec	2014–15	Czech First League	20	3	6	2	3	0	–		29	5
Slovan Liberec	2015–16	Czech First League	14	2	1	0	9	1	1 (Note: Appearance in Czech Supercup)	0	25	3
Slovan Liberec	Total		76	15	12	3	26	2	1	0	115	20
Kasımpaşa	2015–16	Süper Lig	9	0	0	0	–		–		9	0
Kasımpaşa	2016–17	Süper Lig	25	2	8	2	–		–		33	4
Kasımpaşa	2017–18	Süper Lig	32	0	2	0	–		–		34	0
Kasımpaşa	2018–19	Süper Lig	28	1	7	0	–		–		35	1
Kasımpaşa	2019–20	Süper Lig	10	0	0	0	–		–		10	0
Kasımpaşa	2020–21	Süper Lig	4	0	0	0	–		–		4	0
Kasımpaşa	Total		108	3	17	2	0	0	0	0	125	5
Sparta Prague	2020–21	Czech First League	25	2	3	0	5	0	–		37	2
Sparta Prague	2021–22	Czech First League	28	4	2	0	11 (Note: Four appearances in UEFA Champions League, six appearances in UEFA Europa League, one appearance in UEFA Conference League)	0	–		37	4
Sparta Prague	2022–23	Czech First League	18	1	3	0	0	0	–		21	1
Sparta Prague	2023–24	Czech First League	6	1	2	0	2	0	–		10	1
Sparta Prague	2024–25	Czech First League	5	0	1	0	3 (Note: Appearances in UEFA Champions League)	0	–		9	0
Sparta Prague	Total		82	8	11	0	21	0	–		114	8
Sparta Prague II	2022–23	Czech National Football League	1	0	–		–		–		1	0
Sparta Prague II	2023–24	Czech National Football League	1	0	–		–		–		1	0
Sparta Prague II	Total		2	0	–		–		–		2	0
Career total			300	31	42	5	50	2	1	0	393	37

=== International ===
Appearances and goals by national team and year
National team	Year	Apps	Goals
Czech Republic
Czech Republic	2015	5	0
Czech Republic	2016	9	0
Czech Republic	2017	0	0
Czech Republic	2018	4	0
Czech Republic	2019	4	1
Czech Republic	2021	3	0
Total		25	1

Scores and results list Czech Republic's goal tally first, score column indicates score after each Pavelka goal.

List of international goals scored by David Pavelka
No.	Date	Venue	Opponent	Score	Result	Competition
1	26 March 2019	Sinobo Stadium, Prague, Czech Republic	Brazil	1–0	1–3	Friendly

== Honours ==
Sparta Prague

- Czech First League: 2022–23, 2023–24
- Czech Cup: 2023–24
