= 2024–25 FK Mladá Boleslav season =

FK Mladá Boleslav
2024–25 season
- Manager: David Holoubek
- Stadium: Lokotrans Aréna
- Czech First League: Pre-season
- Czech Cup: Fourth round
- UEFA Conference League: League phase
- Average home league attendance: 2,231

The 2024–25 season is the 123rd season in the history of FK Mladá Boleslav, and the 21st consecutive season in Czech First League. In addition to the domestic league, the team participated in the Czech Cup and the UEFA Conference League.

== Transfers ==
=== In ===
| Pos. | Player | Transferred from | Fee | Date | Source |
|---|---|---|---|---|---|
| DF | (Czech Republic) Patrik Vydra | (Czech Republic) Sparta Prague | Loan | 9 July 2024 | |
| GK | (Czech Republic) Jiří Floder | (Czech Republic) MFK Chrudim | Free | 10 July 2024 | |

=== Out ===
| Pos. | Player | Transferred to | Fee | Date | Source |
|---|---|---|---|---|---|
| FW | (Czech Republic) Vojtěch Kubista | (Slovakia) Spartak Trnava | | 1 July 2024 | |
| MF | (Slovakia) Samuel Dancák | (Czech Republic) Hradec Králové | Undisclosed | 10 July 2024 | |
| MF | (Czech Republic) Vasil Kušej | (Czech Republic) Slavia Prague | Undisclosed | 7 January 2025 | |

== Friendlies ==
=== Pre-season ===
| 19 June 2024 Friendly | FC Nový Bor (Czech Republic) | 1–28 | (Czech Republic) Mladá Boleslav |
| 17:00 |

| 28 June 2024 Club's tournament – SF | Mladá Boleslav (Czech Republic) | 3–1 | (Czech Republic) FK Varnsdorf | Benátky nad Jizerou |
| 17:45 | | | | Stadium: Městský stadion |

| 29 June 2024 Club's tournament – F | Slovan Liberec (Czech Republic) | 0–1 | (Czech Republic) Mladá Boleslav | Benátky nad Jizerou |
| 13:30 | Lehoczki (red card) 45+1' | | Kušej 41' | Stadium: Městský stadion |

| 3 July 2024 Friendly | Mladá Boleslav (Czech Republic) | 5–0 | (Czech Republic) FC Sellier & Bellot Vlašim |
| 11:00 |

| 3 July 2024 Friendly | Mladá Boleslav (Czech Republic) | v | (Germany) Energie Cottbus |
| 14:00 |

| 6 July 2024 Friendly | Mladá Boleslav (Czech Republic) | 2–1 | (Czech Republic) Jihlava | Mladá Boleslav |
| 11:00 | Ladra 34'; Kušej 74' | | Chytry 17' | Stadium: Lokotrans Aréna |

| 7 July 2024 Friendly | Mladá Boleslav (Czech Republic) | v | (Poland) Zagłębie Lubin |

| 12 July 2024 Friendly | Śląsk Wrocław (Poland) | 1–1 | (Czech Republic) Mladá Boleslav | Wrocław, Poland |
| 17:30 | Musiolik 22' (pen.) | | Stránský 73' | Stadium: Oporowska Stadium |

== Competitions ==
=== Overall record ===
| Competition | First match | Last match | Starting round | Final position | Record | | | | | | | |
| Competition | First match | Last match | Starting round | Final position | Pld | W | D | L | GF | GA | GD | Win % |
|---|---|---|---|---|---|---|---|---|---|---|---|---|
| Czech First League regular season | 20 July 2024 | 19 April 2025 | Matchday 1 | 14th | 0 | 0 | 0 | 0 | 0 | 0 | +0 | — |
| Czech First League relegation round | 26 April 2024 | 25 May 2025 | Matchday 1 | | 0 | 0 | 0 | 0 | 0 | 0 | +0 | — |
| Czech Cup | 30 October 2024 | | Third round | | 1 | 1 | 0 | 0 | 3 | 1 | +2 | 100.00 |
| UEFA Conference League | 25 July 2024 | 19 December 2024 | Second qualifying round | League phase | 12 | 6 | 2 | 4 | 20 | 15 | +5 | 50.00 |
| Total | | | | | 13 | 7 | 2 | 4 | 23 | 16 | +7 | 53.85 |

Last updated: 19 December 2024
Source: Soccerway

=== Czech First League ===
==== Regular season ====
| Pos | Team | Pld | W | D | L | GF | GA | GD | Pts | Qualification or relegation |
|---|---|---|---|---|---|---|---|---|---|---|
| 9 | Hradec Králové | 30 | 11 | 7 | 12 | 33 | 31 | +2 | 40 | Qualification for the middle group |
| 10 | Bohemians 1905 | 30 | 8 | 10 | 12 | 32 | 42 | −10 | 34 (Note: Head to head points: Bohemians 1905 8, Mladá Boleslav 7, Teplice 1.) | Qualification for the middle group |
| 11 | Mladá Boleslav | 30 | 9 | 7 | 14 | 40 | 40 | 0 | 34 | Qualification for the relegation group |
| 12 | Teplice | 30 | 9 | 7 | 14 | 32 | 42 | −10 | 34 | Qualification for the relegation group |
| 13 | Slovácko | 30 | 7 | 9 | 14 | 25 | 51 | −26 | 30 | Qualification for the relegation group |

Source: Chance Liga
Rules for classification: 1) Points; 2) Head-to-head points; 3) Head-to-head goal difference; 4) Head-to-head goals scored; 5) Goal difference; 6) Goals scored; 7) Fair-play ranking; 8) Draw.

==== Results summary ====
| Overall | | | | | | | | Home | | | | | | Away | | | | | |
| Pld | W | D | L | GF | GA | GD | Pts | W | D | L | GF | GA | GD | W | D | L | GF | GA | GD |
|---|---|---|---|---|---|---|---|---|---|---|---|---|---|---|---|---|---|---|---|
| 19 | 7 | 7 | 5 | 31 | 22 | +9 | 28 | 4 | 4 | 2 | 17 | 10 | +7 | 3 | 3 | 3 | 14 | 12 | +2 |

Last updated: 15 December 2024.
Source: Chance Liga

==== Results by round ====
| Round | 1 | 2 | 3 | 4 | 5 | 6 | 7 | 8 | 9 | 10 | 11 | 12 | 13 | 14 | 15 | 16 | 17 | 18 | 19 |
|---|---|---|---|---|---|---|---|---|---|---|---|---|---|---|---|---|---|---|---|
| Ground | A | H | A | H | A | H | A | H | H | A | H | A | H | A | H | A | H | A | H |
| Result | L | W | L | W | L | L | W | W | D | D | D | D | D | W | D | D | W | W | L |
| Position | 15 | 6 | 11 | 7 | 11 | 12 | 8 | 6 | 8 | 9 | 9 | 9 | 9 | 8 | 9 | 8 | 6 | 6 | 6 |

Updated to match(es) played on 15 December 2024. Source: Chance Liga
A = Away; H = Home; W = Win; D = Draw; L = Loss

==== Matches ====
The match schedule was released on 20 June 2024.

| 20 July 2024 1 | Jablonec | 2–0 | Mladá Boleslav | Jablonec nad Nisou |
| 14:30 UTC+3 | Hollý 31'; Alégué (yellow card) 54'; Chanturishvili 80'; Fortelny (yellow card) 85' | | Sakala (yellow card) 15' (yellow-red card) 45+3'; Suchý (yellow card) 71' (yellow-red card) 72'; Kušej (yellow card) 85' | Stadium: Stadion Střelnice; Referee: Marek Radina |

| 28 July 2024 2 | Mladá Boleslav | v | Slovácko | Mladá Boleslav |
| 17:00 | | | | Stadium: Lokotrans Aréna |

==== Relegation round ====
| Pos | Team | Pld | W | D | L | GF | GA | GD | Pts | Qualification or relegation |
|---|---|---|---|---|---|---|---|---|---|---|
| 11 | Teplice | 35 | 12 | 8 | 15 | 41 | 45 | −4 | 44 | |
| 12 | Mladá Boleslav | 35 | 11 | 8 | 16 | 48 | 48 | 0 | 41 | |
| 13 | Slovácko | 35 | 9 | 11 | 15 | 31 | 56 | −25 | 38 | |
| 14 | Dukla Prague (O) | 35 | 8 | 10 | 17 | 34 | 55 | −21 | 34 | Qualification for the relegation play-offs |
| 15 | Pardubice (O) | 35 | 6 | 7 | 22 | 25 | 56 | −31 | 25 | Qualification for the relegation play-offs |
| 16 | České Budějovice (R) | 35 | 0 | 6 | 29 | 16 | 86 | −70 | 6 | Relegation to FNL |

Source: Chance Liga
Rules for classification: 1) Total points; 2) Points earned in regular season; 3) Head-to-head points (regular season); 4) Head-to-head goal difference (regular season); 5) Head-to-head goals scored (regular season); 5) Goal difference (all matches); 6) Goals scored (all matches); 7) Fair-play ranking; 8) Draw.
(O) Play-off winners; (R) Relegated

=== UEFA Conference League ===
==== Second qualifying round ====
| 25 July 2024 First leg | Mladá Boleslav (Czech Republic) | 2–0 | (Lithuania) FK TransINVEST | Mladá Boleslav |
| 18:00 | Ladra 27'; Kušej 37' | Report | Šveikauskas (yellow card) 39'; Carlos Eduardo (yellow card) 47' | Stadium: Lokotrans Aréna; Referee: Patrik Kolarić (Croatia) |

| 1 August 2024 Second leg | FK TransINVEST (Lithuania) | 0–1 (0–3 agg.) | (Czech Republic) Mladá Boleslav | Vilnius, Lithuania |
| 19:00 UTC+3 | | Report | Vojta 78' | Stadium: LFF Stadium; Attendance: 1,200; Referee: Matthew MacDermid (Scotland) |

==== Third qualifying round ====
| 8 August 2024 | Mladá Boleslav (Czech Republic) | 1–1 | (Israel) Hapoel Be'er Sheva | Lokotrans Aréna, Mladá Boleslav |
| 18:00 | Vydra 39' (pen.) | Report | Yosefi 50' | Attendance: 3,766; Referee: Joni Hyytiä (Finland) |

| 15 August 2024 | Hapoel Be'er Sheva (Israel) | 2–4 (3–5 agg.) | (Czech Republic) Mladá Boleslav | Gradski stadion, Lovech, Bulgaria (Note: Due to the Israel–Hamas war, Israeli teams were required to play their home matches at neutral venues until further notice.) |
| 19:00 (20:00 EEST) | Ahmed 11'; Lopes 42' | Report | Ladra 49', 82'; Králik 59'; Kušej 90' | Attendance: 40; Referee: Joonas Jaanovits (Estonia) |

==== League phase ====
| 3 October 2024 1 | Noah (Armenia) | 2–0 | (Czech Republic) Mladá Boleslav | Yerevan, Armenia |
| 18:45 (20:45 UTC+4) | Aiás 58'; Pinson 76' | Report | | Stadium: Vazgen Sargsyan Republican Stadium; Attendance: 8,000; Referee: Radoslav Gidzhenov (Bulgaria) |
Note: Noah played their home matches at Vazgen Sargsyan Republican Stadium, Yerevan, instead of their regular stadium, Armavir City Stadium, Armavir, which did not meet UEFA requirements.

| 24 October 2024 2 | Mladá Boleslav (Czech Republic) | 0–1 | (Switzerland) Lugano | Mladá Boleslav |
| 21:00 | | Report | Steffen 38' | Stadium: Lokotrans Aréna; Attendance: 2,836; Referee: Chrysovalantis Theouli (Cyprus) |

| 7 November 2024 3 | Vitória de Guimarães (Portugal) | 2–1 | (Czech Republic) Mladá Boleslav | Guimarães, Portugal |
| 21:00 (20:00 UTC+0) | T. Silva 40' (pen.); Rivas 59' | Report | Kušej 72' | Stadium: Estádio D. Afonso Henriques; Attendance: 12,941; Referee: Paweł Raczkowski (Poland) |

| 28 November 2024 4 | Mladá Boleslav (Czech Republic) | 2–1 | (Spain) Real Betis | Mladá Boleslav |
| 21:00 | Vojta 51'; Vydra 54' | Report | Lo Celso 17' | Stadium: Lokotrans Aréna; Attendance: 3,960; Referee: Daniel Schlager (Germany) |

| 12 December 2024 5 | Mladá Boleslav (Czech Republic) | 1–0 | (Poland) Jagiellonia Białystok | Mladá Boleslav |
| 21:00 | Vydra 76' | Report | | Stadium: Lokotrans Aréna; Attendance: 3,316; Referee: David Dickinson (Scotland) |

| 19 December 2024 6 | Molde (Norway) | 4–3 | (Czech Republic) Mladá Boleslav | Molde, Norway |
| 21:00 | Ihler 27'; Král 42' (o.g.); Kaasa 64'; Stenevik 90+1' | Report | Suchý 5'; Kušej 59'; Vydra 61' | Stadium: Aker Stadion; Attendance: 1,750; Referee: Visar Kastrati (Kosovo) |
