= Patrik Vydra =

Czech footballer (born 2003)

Personal information
- Date of birth: 20 June 2003 (age 23)
- Place of birth: Beroun, Czech Republic
- Height: 1.90 m (6 ft 3 in)
- Position: Defender

Team information
- Current team: Sparta Prague
- Number: 26

Youth career
- 2009–2015: Český lev Beroun
- 2015–2021: Sparta Prague

Senior career*
Years	Team	Apps	(Gls)
2021–2023	Sparta Prague B	29	(1)
2022–	Sparta Prague	49	(4)
2024	→ Mladá Boleslav (loan)	18	(1)

International career^{‡}
2018–2019	Czech Republic U16	5	(0)
2019	Czech Republic U17	1	(0)
2021–2022	Czech Republic U19	9	(2)
2022–2023	Czech Republic U20	4	(0)
2022–	Czech Republic U21	6	(0)
- * Club domestic league appearances and goals as of 9 March 2026 ‡ National team caps and goals as of 20 December 2023

Patrik Vydra (born 20 June 2003) is a Czech footballer who plays as a defender for Sparta Prague.

== Club career ==
Patrik Vydra was raised in Beroun. After winning many individual awards as a junior, he transferred to Sparta Prague, where he progressed through the youth and B teams. He made his league debut for the A team of Sparta Prague in the Czech First League on 20 April 2022, at the age of 19.

== International career ==
Vydra gradually went through the youth national teams of the Czech Republic. In 2023, he became one of the important figures of the newly assembled selection of the Czech Republic U21 team.

On 9 July 2024, Vydra joined Mladá Boleslav on a one-year loan deal.

== Career statistics ==
As of 15 March 2025

Appearances and goals by club, season and competition
Club	Season	League			Cup		Continental		Other		Total	
Club	Season	Division	Apps	Goals	Apps	Goals	Apps	Goals	Apps	Goals	Apps	Goals
Sparta Prague	2021–22	Czech First League	3	0	—		—		—		3	0
Sparta Prague	2022–23	Czech First League	5	0	—		—		—		5	0
Sparta Prague	2023–24	Czech First League	8	1	3	0	3	0	—		14	1
Sparta Prague	2024–25	Czech First League	5	0	1	1	0	0	—		6	1
Sparta Prague	Total		21	1	4	1	3	0	—		28	2
Mladá Boleslav (loan)	2024–25	Czech First League	18	1	0	0	11	0	—		29	1
Career total			39	2	4	1	14	0	0	0	57	3

== Honours ==
Sparta Prague

- Czech First League: 2022–23, 2023–24
- Czech Cup: 2023–24
