= Adam Hložek =

Czech footballer (born 2002)

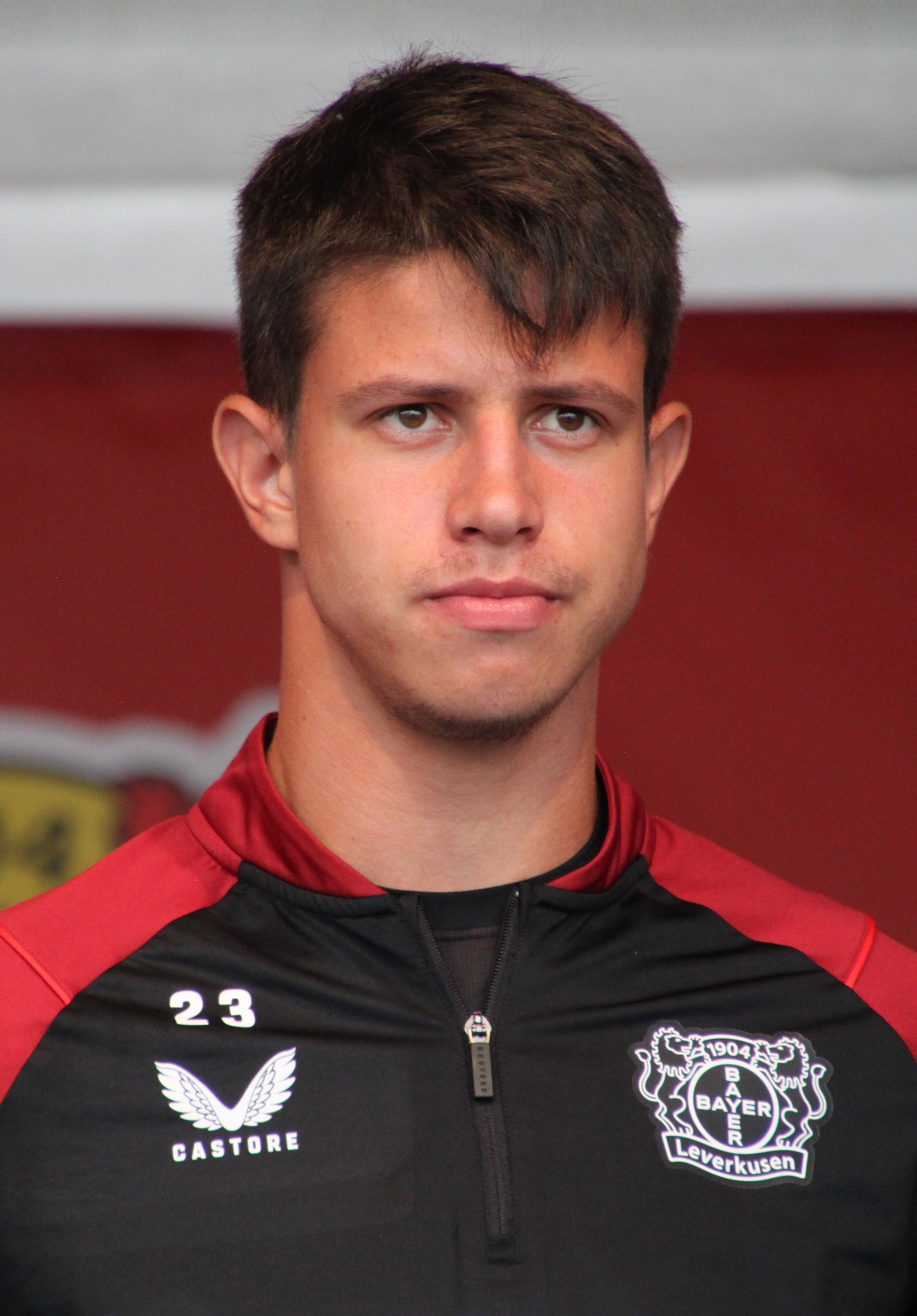
- Hložek with Bayer Leverkusen in 2022

Personal information
- Date of birth: 25 July 2002 (age 24)
- Place of birth: Ivančice, Czech Republic
- Height: 1.88 m (6 ft 2 in)
- Positions: Winger; attacking midfielder

Team information
- Current team: TSG Hoffenheim
- Number: 10

Youth career
- 2008–2014: FC Ivančice
- 2014–2018: Sparta Prague

Senior career*
Years	Team	Apps	(Gls)
2018–2022	Sparta Prague	105	(34)
2022–2024	Bayer Leverkusen	52	(7)
2024–	TSG Hoffenheim	39	(10)

International career^{‡}
2017	Czech Republic U15	5	(4)
2017–2018	Czech Republic U16	10	(7)
2018–2019	Czech Republic U17	10	(5)
2019–	Czech Republic U21	8	(3)
2020–	Czech Republic	52	(6)
- * Club domestic league appearances and goals as of 31 October 2026 ‡ National team caps and goals as of 15 November 2026

Adam Hložek (born 25 July 2002) is a Czech professional footballer who plays as a forward for Bundesliga club TSG Hoffenheim and the Czech Republic national team.

== Club career ==
=== Sparta Prague ===
Hložek was 12 years old when transferred from his hometown club Ivančice to Sparta Prague along with his older brother Daniel, who was 16 at the time.

Four years later, on 2 October 2018, he made his first team debut in a Czech Cup match against Slavoj Polná as a substitute, scoring the final goal in a 4–1 away win. Hložek made his league debut for Sparta Prague on 10 November 2018 in a 3–1 victory against Karviná at the age of 16 years, three months and 16 days – becoming the youngest Sparta player to appear in a league match.

Hložek finished the 2020–21 Czech First League as joint top scorer, alongside Jan Kuchta with 15 goals, despite missing four months of the season due to injury. On 30 May 2021, a day after scoring four first-half goals in a 6–1 away victory against Zbrojovka Brno, Hložek signed a new contract extension until 2024 with Sparta Prague. Hložek finished the 2020–21 league season with 15 goals and seven assists in 19 games.

=== Bayer Leverkusen ===
On 2 June 2022, Hložek joined Bayer Leverkusen in Germany, signing a five-year contract, and got the number 23 on his jersey.

==== 2022–23: Debut season ====
On 30 July 2022, Hložek scored a powerful shot outside the box against Elversberg on his debut. On 22 October 2022, against VFL Wolfsburg, he provided a critical assist to draw 2–2. On 26 October, Hložek would provide a vital assist against Atlético Madrid to make it 2–2 in the Champions League. He continued this good form against Union Berlin, which he provided another assist and a backheel goal to make it a comfortable 5–0 victory for Leverkusen. Couple matches after, Hložek had another strong performance against Borussia Monchengladbach where he provided two assists in a 3–2 win. In March, Hložek would head in the winning goal against Werder Bremen. On 20 April 2023, Hložek scored and provided a goal against Union Saint-Gilloise in the UEFA Europa League and help Leverkusen to reach the semi-finals. On 23 April 2023, Hložek scored to earn a 2–0 victory over RB Leipzig.

==== 2023–24 season ====
In the first match of the season, Hložek scored twice and provided an assist off the bench during a 8–0 victory against Teutonia 05 in the DFB-Pokal. He scored again against SV Sandhausen in the next round. On 9 February 2023, Hložek scored almost immediately off the bench in a 5–1 victory against SV Darmstadt 98. On 5 October, Hložek provided an assist against Molde FK in the 2023–24 UEFA Europa League. He scored a double goal against the Norwegian football club during the second leg which ended in a 5–1 victory for Leverkusen.

On 17 March 2024, Hložek scored an important goal in a 3–2 victory against SC Freiburg. After returning from an ankle injury which had him ruled out for a month, he provided a hattrick of assists against Eintracht Frankfurt in a 5–1 victory on 5 May 2024 and was awarded man of the match. Hložek played in the 2023–24 UEFA Europa League final with a shot outside the box in the last 20 minutes, but could not score and Leverkusen lost their 51-game unbeaten streak after losing 3–0 to Atalanta.

=== TSG Hoffenheim ===
On 17 August 2024, Hložek signed a multi-year contract with Bundesliga club TSG Hoffenheim. On matchday two in the Bundesliga, Hložek assisted Andrej Kramarić in a 3–1 loss against Frankfurt. Hložek missed out on the next two games due to thigh problems but right after he scored his first goal for the club on 21 September 2024, against Werder Bremen in a 4–3 loss. On 3 October, Hložek scored his first brace for the club in a 2–0 win over Dynamo Kyiv in the Europa League. After a tremendous break with the national team, Hložek continued that momentum against RB Leipzig and scored another brace in another 4–3 win.

On 18 January 2025, Hložek scored a brace against Holstein Kiel in a 3–1 win. On 27 January, Hložek assisted Gift Orban and scored a goal in the 96th minute to secure a 2–2 draw against Frankfurt.

== International career ==
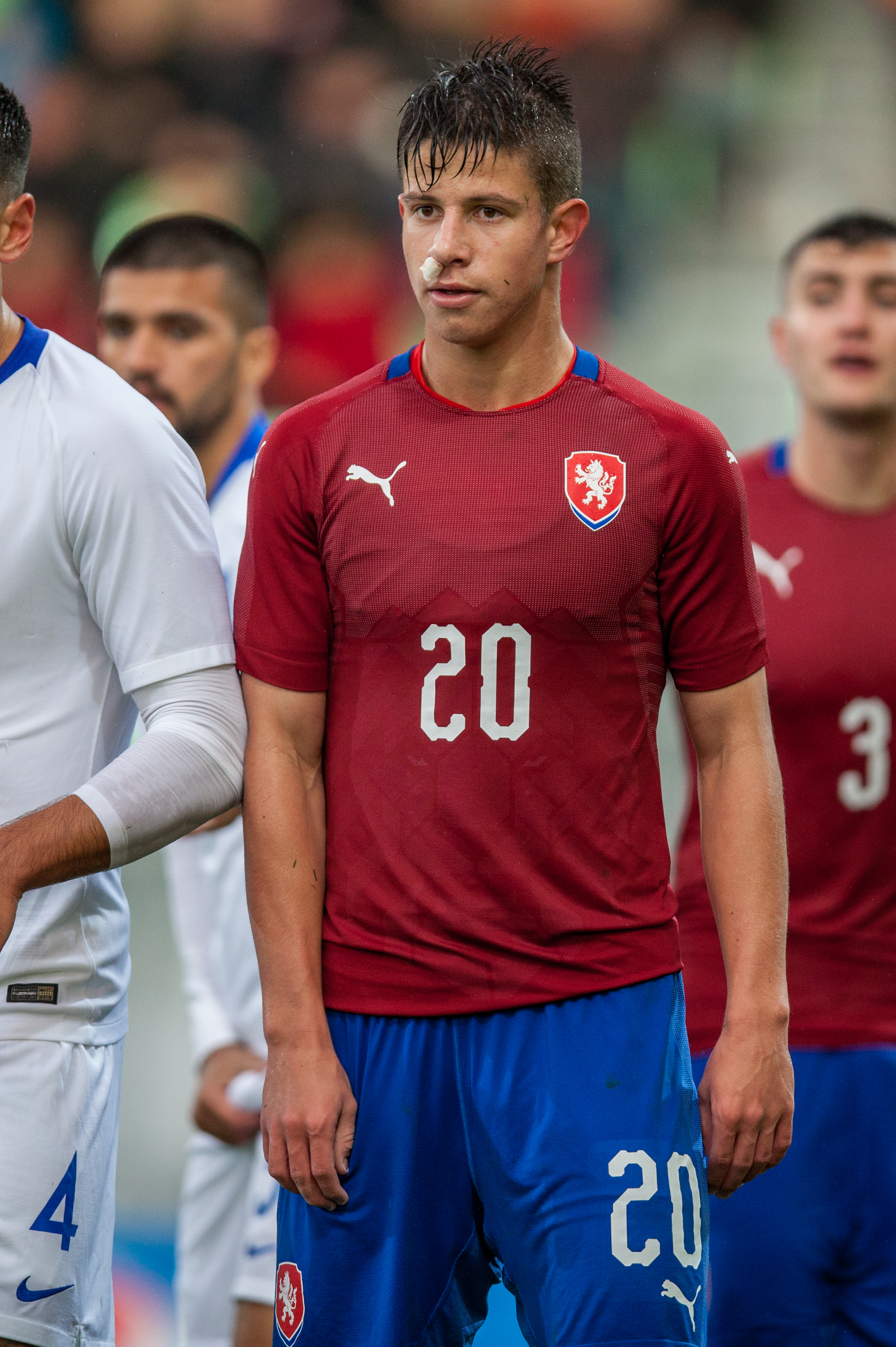
Hložek with the Czech Republic U21 in 2019

On 4 September 2020, Hložek debuted for the Czech senior squad in a UEFA Nations League match against Slovakia.

In May 2021, Hložek was called up by the Czech Republic for the rescheduled UEFA Euro 2020. He scored his first international goal in October 2021 in the 2–0 World Cup qualification victory against Belarus.

On 31 May 2026, Hložek was selected in the 26-man squad for the 2026 FIFA World Cup.

== Career statistics ==
=== Club ===
As of match played 31 October 2026

Appearances and goals by club, season and competition
Club	Season	League			National cup (Note: Includes Czech Cup, DFB-Pokal)		Europe		Total	
Club	Season	Division	Apps	Goals	Apps	Goals	Apps	Goals	Apps	Goals
Sparta Prague	2018–19	Czech First League	19	3	4	1	—		23	4
Sparta Prague	2019–20	Czech First League	34	7	4	1	1 (Note: Appearance(s) in UEFA Europa League)	1	39	9
Sparta Prague	2020–21	Czech First League	19	15	3	0	1	0	23	15
Sparta Prague	2021–22	Czech First League	33	9	3	1	11 (Note: Four appearances in UEFA Champions League, five appearances and one goal in UEFA Europa League, two appearances and one goal in UEFA Europa Conference League)	2	47	12
Sparta Prague	Total		105	34	13	3	13	3	132	40
Bayer Leverkusen	2022–23	Bundesliga	29	5	1	1	14 (Note: Six appearances in UEFA Champions League, eight appearances and one goal in UEFA Europa League)	1	44	7
Bayer Leverkusen	2023–24	Bundesliga	23	2	4	3	9	2	36	7
Bayer Leverkusen	Total		52	7	5	4	23	3	80	14
TSG Hoffenheim	2024–25	Bundesliga	27	8	2	0	8	3	37	11
TSG Hoffenheim	2025–26	Bundesliga	5	0	0	0	—		5	0
TSG Hoffenheim	2026–27	Bundesliga	7	2	2	1	3	1	12	4
TSG Hoffenheim	Total		39	10	4	1	11	4	54	15
Career total			196	51	23	8	47	10	266	69

=== International ===
As of match played 15 November 2026

Appearances and goals by national team and year
National team	Year	Apps	Goals
Czech Republic	2020	2	0
Czech Republic	2021	10	1
Czech Republic	2022	7	0
Czech Republic	2023	10	1
Czech Republic	2024	11	1
Czech Republic	2025	1	1
Czech Republic	2026	11	2
Total		52	6

Scores and results list the Czech Republic's goal tally first, score column indicates score after each Hložek goal.

List of international goals scored by Adam Hložek
No.	Date	Venue	Opponent	Score	Result	Competition
1	11 October 2021	Central Stadium, Kazan, Russia	Belarus	2–0	2–0	2022 FIFA World Cup qualification
2	20 June 2023	City Stadium, Podgorica, Montenegro	Montenegro	4–1	4–1	Friendly
3	19 November 2024	Andrův stadion, Olomouc, Czech Republic	Georgia	2–0	2–1	2024–25 UEFA Nations League B
4	6 June 2025	Doosan Arena, Plzeň, Czech Republic	Montenegro	1–0	2–0	2026 FIFA World Cup qualification
5	31 May 2026	Stadion Letná, Prague, Czech Republic	Kosovo	2–0	2–1	Friendly
6	15 November 2026	Opus Arena, Osijek, Croatia	Croatia	1–1	1–2	2026–27 UEFA Nations League A

== Honours ==
Sparta Prague

- Czech Cup: 2019–20

Bayer Leverkusen

- Bundesliga: 2023–24
- DFB-Pokal: 2023–24

Individual

- Czech Talent of the Year: 2019
- Czech First League Top Goalscorer: 2020–21
- Czech First League Forward of the Year: 2020–21
- Czech First League Player of the Month: September 2020, May 2021
- Czech First League Fans' choice Player of the Season: 2019–20, 2021–22
