= Dominik Holec =

Czech-Slovak footballer (born 1994)

Personal information
- Full name: Dominik Holec
- Date of birth: 28 July 1994 (age 32)
- Place of birth: České Budějovice, Czech Republic
- Height: 1.91 m (6 ft 3 in)
- Position: Goalkeeper

Team information
- Current team: Garudayaksa
- Number: 30

Youth career
- 2004–2013: Žilina

Senior career*
Years	Team	Apps	(Gls)
2012–2020	Žilina	54	(0)
2015	→ Teplička nad Váhom (loan)	11	(0)
2016	→ Pohronie (loan)	12	(0)
2017	→ ViOn Zlaté Moravce (loan)	3	(0)
2018	→ Senica (loan)	14	(0)
2020–2023	Sparta Prague	17	(0)
2021	→ Raków Częstochowa (loan)	16	(0)
2023	→ Lech Poznań (loan)	1	(0)
2023	→ Lech Poznań II (loan)	1	(0)
2023–2024	Karviná	25	(0)
2024–2026	Baník Ostrava	32	(0)
2026	Piast Gliwice	6	(0)
2026–	Garudayaksa	1	(0)

International career
2010	Slovakia U17	1	(0)
2013	Slovakia U19	1	(0)
2022	Slovakia	1	(0)
- * Club domestic league appearances and goals as of 18:00, 6 September 2026 (UTC)

Dominik Holec (born 28 July 1994) is a Slovak professional footballer who plays as a goalkeeper for Super League club Garudayaksa.

== Club career ==
=== FC ViOn Zlaté Moravce ===
Holec made his Fortuna Liga debut for ViOn Zlaté Moravce in an away loss on 26 February 2017 in a match against his mother club Žilina. Holec conceded four goals in a 4-1 defeat, being beaten by Miroslav Káčer, future international Samuel Mráz, 2016–17 First Football League top scorer Filip Hlohovský and Lukáš Jánošík.

=== MŠK Žilina ===
Holec was released from Žilina, as the club had entered liquidation, due to a coronavirus pandemic.

=== Sparta Prague ===
On 28 May 2020, it was announced that commencing the following season, Holec would become the goalkeeper of Czech club Sparta Prague. It was also revealed that Sparta had previously been interested in Holec, prior to his release from Žilina, and he had signed for the Czech side despite interest from unnamed Belgian and Spanish teams. Holec had cited the approach of club official Tomáš Rosický as a strong factor in the decision to join the club.

=== Karviná ===
On 28 August 2023, Holec signed a contract with Karviná.

=== Baník Ostrava ===
On 16 July 2024, Holec signed a two-year contract with Baník Ostrava.

=== Piast Gliwice ===
On 26 March 2026, shortly after terminating his contract with Baník, Holec moved to Polish top-flight outfit Piast Gliwice on a three-month deal.

== International career ==
Holec enjoyed his first inclusion in the wider squad of Slovak senior national team in November 2019, when he was listed as an alternate by Pavel Hapal for two qualifying UEFA Euro 2020 qualifying fixtures against Croatia and Azerbaijan. After Dominik Greif was ruled out of the match due to health issues, Holec joined the squad ahead of the Azerbaijan fixture. Holec was also additionally called up in September 2021, when Dušan Kuciak tested positive for COVID-19, but again failed to make an appearance.

In March 2022, Holec was nominated for two friendly fixtures against Norway and Finland. He did not make an appearance on 25 March 2022 in Oslo fixture against Norway, which concluded in a 2-0 defeat, following strikes by Erling Haaland and Martin Ødegaard. Days later, Holec appeared in the starting line-up in the subsequent match, debuting on 29 March 2022, in a neutral field international friendly against Finland. Following an agreement with the goalkeeper's coach Miroslav Seman, Holec and a fellow debutant, František Plach, were to both feature for one half of the game. During the first half, Holec faced two shots from the opposing team. The match concluded in a 2-0 victory, after a first-half strike by Ondrej Duda and a second-half securing goal by Erik Jirka. Following the match, Holec and Plach both praised the defensive line commanded by Milan Škriniar, expressed pride over representing their nation and claimed that the lack of spectators was the only regret related to their debut.

== Personal life ==
Holec is a Slovak although he was born in present-day Czech Republic, in České Budějovice, to father Peter, who played in local Dynamo at the time, and an ethnic Czech mother. He also has a brother. During his spell in Lech Poznań, he described his family as a Czecho-Slovak mix.

== Career statistics ==
=== Club ===
As of match played 6 September 2026

Appearances and goals by club, season and competition
Club	Season	League			National cup (Note: Includes Czech Cup, Polish Cup)		Continental		Other		Total	
Club	Season	Division	Apps	Goals	Apps	Goals	Apps	Goals	Apps	Goals	Apps	Goals
ViOn Zlaté Moravce (loan)	2016–17	Slovak First League	3	0	—		—		—		3	0
Žilina	2017–18	Slovak First League	2	0	0	0	0	0	—		2	0
Žilina	2018–19	Slovak First League	30	0	0	0	—		—		30	0
Žilina	2019–20	Slovak First League	22	0	0	0	—		—		22	0
Žilina	Total		54	0	0	0	—		—		54	0
Senica (loan)	2017–18	Slovak First League	14	0	—		—		—		14	0
Sparta Prague	2020–21	Czech First League	0	0	0	0	0	0	—		0	0
Sparta Prague	2021–22	Czech First League	10	0	1	0	4 (Note: Two appearances in UEFA Europa League, two appearances in UEFA Europa Conference League)	0	—		15	0
Sparta Prague	2022–23	Czech First League	7	0	0	0	2 (Note: Appearances in UEFA Conference League)	0	—		9	0
Sparta Prague	Total		17	0	1	0	6	0	—		24	0
Raków Częstochowa (loan)	2020–21	Ekstraklasa	16	0	3	0	—		—		19	0
Lech Poznań (loan)	2022–23	Ekstraklasa	1	0	—		0	0	—		1	0
Lech Poznań II (loan)	2022–23	II liga	1	0	—		—		—		1	0
Karviná	2023–24	Czech First League	25	0	0	0	—		—		25	0
Baník Ostrava	2024–25	Czech First League	17	0	4	0	1	0	—		22	0
Baník Ostrava	2025–26	Czech First League	15	0	1	0	6 (Note: Two appearances in UEFA Europa League, four appearances in UEFA Conference League)	0	—		22	0
Baník Ostrava	Total		32	0	5	0	7	0	—		44	0
Piast Gliwice	2025–26	Ekstraklasa	6	0	—		—		—		6	0
Garudayaksa	2026–27	Super League	1	0	0	0	0	0	—		1	0
Career total			170	0	9	0	13	0	0	0	192	0

=== International ===
Appearances and goals by national team and year
National team	Year	Apps	Goals
Slovakia
Slovakia	2022	1	0
Total		1	0

== Honours ==
Raków Częstochowa

- Polish Cup: 2020–21

Individual

- Slovak Super Liga Player of the Month: October 2019
