= Petr Javorek =

Czech footballer (born 1986)

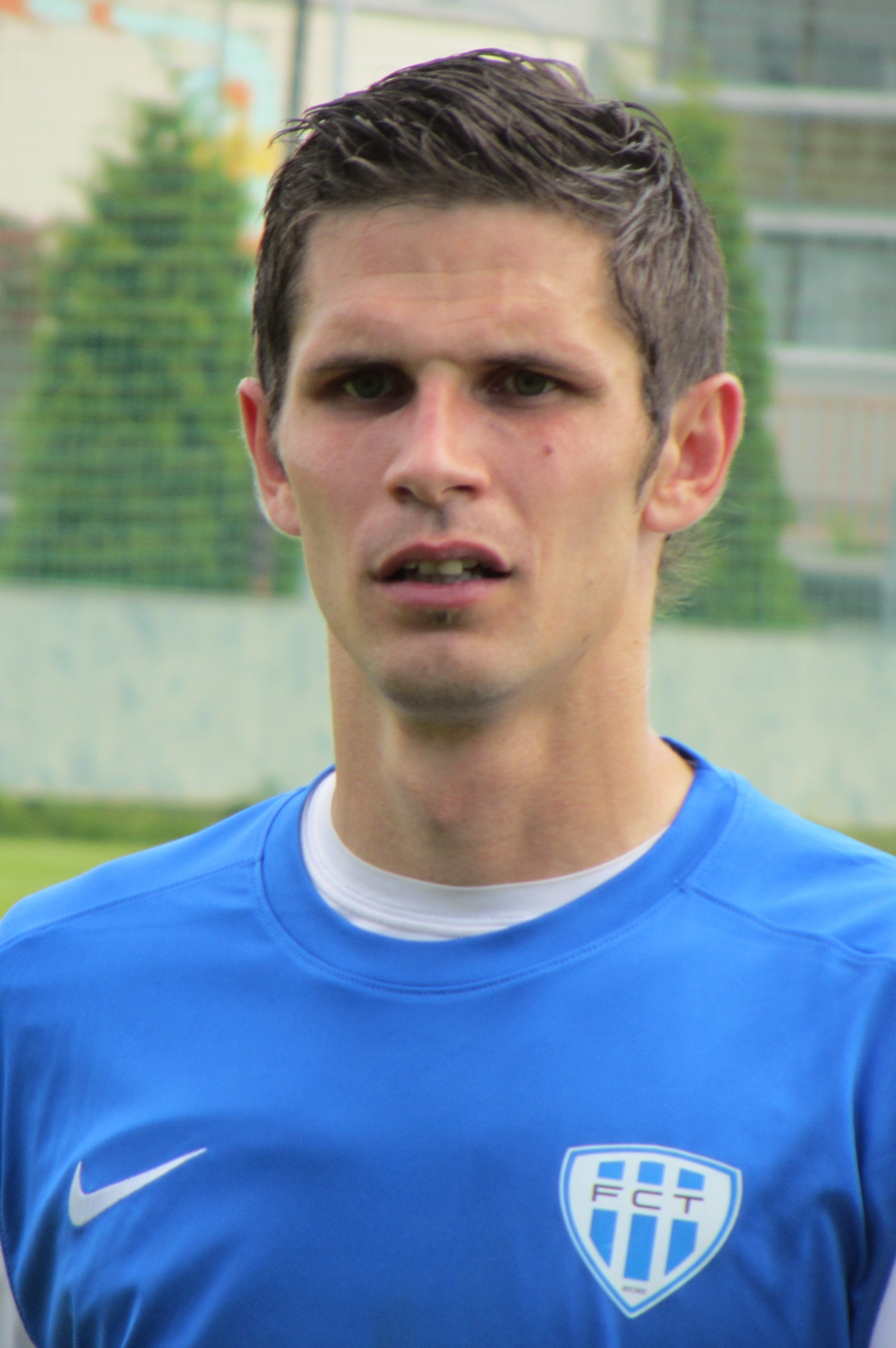
- Javorek in 2014

Personal information
- Date of birth: 2 September 1986 (age 40)
- Place of birth: Prague, Czechoslovakia
- Height: 1.86 m (6 ft 1 in)
- Position: Midfielder

Team information
- Current team: České Budějovice B

Youth career
- 1992–1995: Sokol Nový Knín
- 1995–2005: Marila Příbram

Senior career*
| Years | Team | Apps | (Gls) |
| 2005–2006 | Marila Příbram | 7 | (0) |
| 2005–2006 | → Horní Počernice (loan) | 15 | (1) |
| 2007–2010 | Slavia Prague | 0 | (0) |
| 2009–2010 | → Hlučín (loan) | 30 | (2) |
| 2010–2017 | MAS Táborsko (Note: Spartak MAS Sezimovo Ústí changed its name to MAS Táborsko in 2011.) | 156 | (29) |
| 2011–2013 | → České Budějovice (loan) | 44 | (2) |
| 2017–2022 | České Budějovice | 102 | (7) |
| 2022– | České Budějovice B | ? | (?) |
| 2022 | → MAS Táborsko (loan) | 14 | (0) |
- * Club domestic league appearances and goals as of 17:14, 13 January 2023 (UTC)

Petr Javorek (born 2 September 1986) is a Czech professional footballer who plays as a midfielder for Bohemian Football League club České Budějovice B.

== Career ==
Javorek made his professional debut for Marila Příbram on 19 March 2005, replacing Martin Čupr in a 2–1 away loss to Baník Ostrava.
