= Jan Kuchta =

Czech footballer (born 1997)

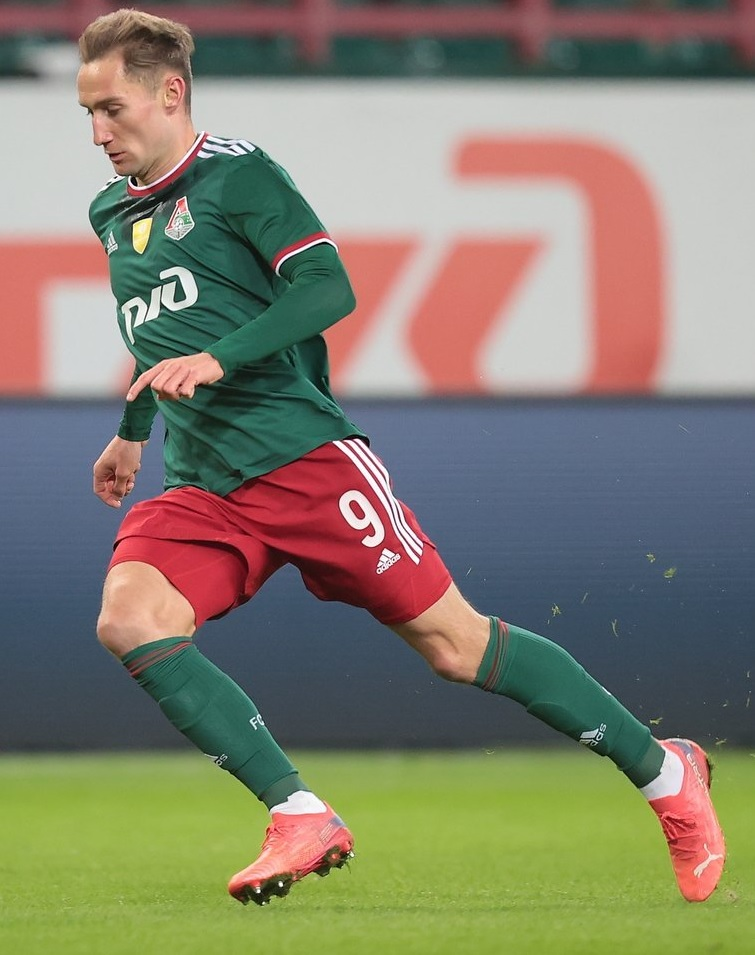
- Kuchta with Lokomotiv Moscow in 2022

Personal information
- Date of birth: 8 January 1997 (age 29)
- Place of birth: Liberec, Czech Republic
- Height: 1.85 m (6 ft 1 in)
- Position: Forward

Team information
- Current team: Legia Warsaw (on loan from Sparta Prague)
- Number: 7

Youth career
- 2010–2013: Sparta Prague
- 2013–2016: Slavia Prague

Senior career*
Years	Team	Apps	(Gls)
2016–2020	Slavia Prague	1	(0)
2016–2017	→ Bohemians (loan)	21	(0)
2018	→ Viktoria Žižkov (loan)	12	(4)
2018	→ Slovácko (loan)	14	(4)
2019	→ Teplice (loan)	8	(3)
2019–2020	→ Slovan Liberec (loan)	13	(2)
2020	Slovan Liberec	10	(4)
2020–2022	Slavia Prague	43	(24)
2022–2023	Lokomotiv Moscow	10	(3)
2022–2023	→ Sparta Prague (loan)	29	(14)
2023–2024	Sparta Prague	35	(17)
2024–2025	Midtjylland	9	(1)
2025	→ Sparta Prague (loan)	13	(7)
2025–	Sparta Prague	30	(12)
2026–	→ Legia Warsaw (loan)	0	(0)

International career^{‡}
2014–2015	Czech Republic U18	12	(3)
2015–2016	Czech Republic U19	9	(4)
2017–2018	Czech Republic U20	6	(1)
2018	Czech Republic U21	3	(2)
2021–	Czech Republic	31	(3)
- * Club domestic league appearances and goals as of 25 May 2026 ‡ National team caps and goals as of 31 May 2026

Jan Kuchta (born 8 January 1997) is a Czech professional footballer who plays as a forward for Ekstraklasa club Legia Warsaw, on loan from Sparta Prague, and the Czech Republic national team.

== Club career ==
=== Slavia Prague ===
Kuchta made his Czech First League debut for Slavia Prague on 8 November 2015 in a game against Bohemians.

In January 2019, he joined Teplice on loan until June 2020.

In February 2020, Kuchta signed for Slovan Liberec on a permanent deal, following a loan move at the club. In July 2020, Kuchta re-signed for Slavia Prague. Kuchta finished the 2020–21 Czech First League as joint top scorer, alongside Adam Hložek with 15 goals. In the final match of the season on 29 May 2021, Kuchta scored his side's winning goal against Dynamo České Budějovice which confirmed an undefeated league season for Slavia, the first time a Czech club reached this milestone since rivals Sparta Prague did so in 2009–10.

=== Lokomotiv Moscow ===
On 12 January 2022, Kuchta signed a contract with Russian Premier League club Lokomotiv Moscow until 2026.

He made his league debut for Lokomotiv on 6 March 2022 against FC Khimki and scored the winning goal in a 3–2 victory. However, he never served a disqualification that he received for getting sent off in his last game for Slavia, and, according to FIFA regulations, was not eligible to play, FC Khimki filed a protest. The protest was denied on 10 March 2022, according to Russian Football Union, Kuchta should have been disqualified for the Russian Cup game Lokomotiv played against Yenisey Krasnoyarsk on 3 March and lost 4–0, as Czech regulations extend disqualifications to Cup games, even though Russian regulations do not, so he was technically disqualified for "one league or Cup game" as opposed to "one league game". Lokomotiv did not provide the document detailing the disqualification to the league, the club claimed they did not receive it during the transfer, and he was allowed by the RFU to play in the Cup game. His disqualification is considered served after that game, even though he actually played in it, as per FIFA regulations. Khimki considered lodging an appeal.

=== Sparta Prague ===
In June 2022, Kuchta joined Sparta Prague on a one-year long loan with an option for a permanent transfer. In his first match for Sparta Prague in the Czech First League (2–1 home loss against Slovan Liberec) he stepped on Liberec goalkeeper Olivier Vliegen's head and received a yellow card, which the referee changed to a red card after he saw video footage. Kuchta was banned for five league matches by LFA Disciplinary Commission. The club with Kuchta appealed his ban, but the appeal was rejected by Appeals Committee on 11 August 2022.

Kuchta helped the club to win its first championship title since 2014.

In June 2023, Sparta exercised the option to buy in the loan contract, signing a multi-year contract with Kuchta.

In May 2024, Kuchta helped the club to win its second championship title in two seasons and domestic cup. He was awarded as the forward of the 2023–24 season by the League Football Association.

=== Midtjylland ===
On 31 August 2024, Kuchta signed a contract with Danish Superliga club Midtjylland until 2028.

=== Sparta Prague (loan) ===
On 15 January 2025, Kuchta joined Sparta Prague on half-year loan deal with option for a permanent transfer.

=== Sparta Prague ===
On 30 May 2025, Kuchta signed a multi-year contract with Sparta Prague.

=== Legia Warsaw ===
On 10 August 2026, Kuchta was loaned to Ekstraklasa club Legia Warsaw with an option to buy.

== International career ==
Kuchta debuted for the Czech Republic national team on 8 October 2021 in a 2022 FIFA World Cup qualification against Wales. On 19 November 2023, Kuchta with Vladimír Coufal and Jakub Brabec had been kicked out of the Czech Republic's national team camp after they allegedly went out clubbing two days before the UEFA Euro 2024 qualifying Group E against Moldova. He was included in Ivan Hašek's Czech Republic 26-man squad for the UEFA Euro 2024.

On 31 May 2026, Kuchta was selected in the 26-man squad for the 2026 FIFA World Cup.

== Career statistics ==
=== Club ===
As of match played 25 July 2026

Appearances and goals by club, season and competition
Club	Season	League			National cup (Note: Includes Czech Cup, Russian Cup, Danish Cup)		Europe		Total	
Club	Season	Division	Apps	Goals	Apps	Goals	Apps	Goals	Apps	Goals
Slavia Prague	2015–16	Czech First League	1	0	0	0	—		1	0
Bohemians (loan)	2016–17	Czech First League	17	0	3	1	—		20	1
Bohemians (loan)	2017–18	Czech First League	4	0	0	0	—		4	0
Bohemians (loan)	Total		21	0	3	1	—		24	1
Viktoria Žižkov (loan)	2017–18	Czech National Football League	12	4	—		—		12	4
Slovácko (loan)	2018–19	Czech First League	14	4	2	1	—		16	5
Teplice (loan)	2018–19	Czech First League	8	3	0	0	—		8	3
Slovan Liberec (loan)	2019–20	Czech First League	13	2	2	1	—		15	3
Slovan Liberec	2019–20	Czech First League	10	4	2	0	—		12	4
Slavia Prague	2020–21	Czech First League	27	15	3	3	11 (Note: One appearance in UEFA Champions League, ten appearances and two goals in UEFA Europa League)	2	41	20
Slavia Prague	2021–22	Czech First League	16	9	1	0	8 (Note: Two appearances in UEFA Champions League, one appearance in UEFA Europa League, five appearances and three goals in UEFA Europa Conference League)	3	25	12
Slavia Prague	Total		43	24	4	3	19	5	66	32
Lokomotiv Moscow	2021–22	Russian Premier League	10	3	1	0	—		11	3
Sparta Prague (loan)	2022–23	Czech First League	29	14	4	2	2 (Note: Appearances in UEFA Conference League)	0	35	16
Sparta Prague	2023–24	Czech First League	32	17	2	1	14 (Note: Two appearances in UEFA Champions League, twelve appearances and three goals in UEFA Europa League)	3	47	21
Sparta Prague	2024–25	Czech First League	3	0	0	0	5 (Note: Appearances in UEFA Champions League)	0	8	0
Sparta Prague	Total		35	17	2	1	19	3	55	21
Midtjylland	2024–25	Danish Superliga	9	1	2	1	5 (Note: Appearances in UEFA Europa League)	0	16	2
Sparta Prague (loan)	2024–25	Czech First League	13	7	4	0	—		17	7
Sparta Prague	2025–26	Czech First League	30	12	2	0	13	3	45	15
Sparta Prague	2026–27	Czech First League	1	0	—		0	0	1	0
Sparta Prague	Total		31	12	2	0	13	3	46	15
Legia Warsaw (loan)	2026–27	Ekstraklasa	0	0	0	0	—		0	0
Career total			241	92	27	10	58	11	326	113

=== International ===
As of 31 May 2026

Appearances and goals by national team and year
National team	Year	Apps	Goals
Czech Republic	2021	4	0
Czech Republic	2022	8	2
Czech Republic	2023	8	1
Czech Republic	2024	7	0
Czech Republic	2025	3	0
Czech Republic	2026	1	0
Total		31	3

Scores and results list Czech Republic's goal tally first, score column indicates score after each Kuchta goal.

List of international goals scored by Jan Kuchta
No.	Date	Venue	Opponent	Score	Result	Competition
1	2 June 2022	Sinobo Stadium, Prague, Czech Republic	Switzerland	1–0	2–1	2022–23 UEFA Nations League A
2	5 June 2022	Sinobo Stadium, Prague, Czech Republic	Spain	2–1	2–2	2022–23 UEFA Nations League A
3	24 March 2023	Fortuna Arena, Prague, Czech Republic	Poland	3–0	3–1	UEFA Euro 2024 qualifying

== Honours ==
FC Slovan Liberec

- Czech Cup runner-up: 2019–20

Slavia Prague

- Czech First League: 2020–21
- Czech Cup: 2020–21

Sparta Prague

- Czech First League: 2022–23, 2023–24
- Czech Cup: 2023–24
- Czech Cup runner-up: 2022–23

Individual

- Czech First League Player of the Month: January 2021
- Czech First League Top goalscorer: 2020–21
- Czech First League Forward of the season: 2023–24
