= Lukáš Juliš =

Czech footballer

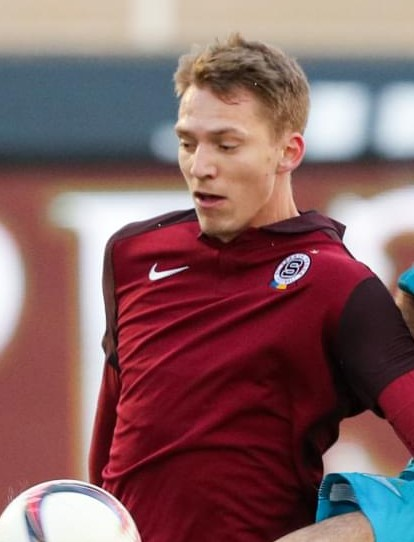
- Juliš in 2017

Personal information
- Date of birth: 2 December 1994 (age 31)
- Place of birth: Chrudim, Czech Republic
- Height: 1.87 m (6 ft 2 in)
- Position: Forward

Team information
- Current team: Žilina
- Number: 39

Youth career
- –2011: Sparta Prague

Senior career*
Years	Team	Apps	(Gls)
2011–2013	Sparta Prague B	10	(3)
2013–2023	Sparta Prague	84	(22)
2018–2019	→ Bohemians (loan)	7	(0)
2020	→ Sigma Olomouc (loan)	12	(8)
2023	Ibiza	13	(1)
2023–2025	Sigma Olomouc	37	(12)
2025–	Žilina	15	(0)

International career
2010	Czech Republic U16	8	(3)
2010–2011	Czech Republic U17	9	(3)
2011–2012	Czech Republic U18	9	(2)
2012–2013	Czech Republic U19	12	(3)
2017–2020	Czech Republic U21	7	(1)
- * Club domestic league appearances and goals as of 25 May 2026

Lukáš Juliš (born 2 December 1994) is a Czech professional footballer who plays as a forward for Slovak club Žilina. He has played for the Czech Republic at youth levels up to under-21. Juliš has played on loan in the Czech First League for Bohemians and Sigma Olomouc, as well as playing at a lower level for the B-side of Sparta Prague.

== Club career ==
=== Sparta Prague ===
==== Reserves ====
Juliš made ten appearances scoring three goals for Sparta Prague B. He made his league debut on 6 August 2011 in Czech 2. Liga match against SC Znojmo. On 21 August 2011 against FK Varnsdorf, he started the game and scored a hat-trick.

==== First team ====
Juliš made his Czech First League debut on 31 July 2013 in a league match against Slavia Prague. He scored his Czech First League first goal on 22 March 2014 in a match against Baník Ostrava.

In the 2017–18 and 2018–19 seasons Juliš suffered several long-term injuries. He spent the spring of 2020 on loan at Sigma Olomouc. He got his confidence back scoring eight league goals and he returned to Sparta in the summer.

On 5 November 2020, he scored a hat-trick in a 4–1 away win against Celtic in the 2020–21 UEFA Europa League. In the home match against Celtic on 27 November he scored a brace in a second 4–1 win.

=== Ibiza ===
Juliš joined UD Ibiza of the Segunda División in January 2023, signing a half-season contract.

=== Sigma Olomouc ===
Juliš joined Sigma Olomouc in June 2023, signing a two-season contract.

=== Žilina ===
On 5 June 2025, Juliš signed a contract with Žilina until 31 December 2027 as a free agent.

== International career ==
Juliš has represented his country at various age groups. He was a member of the Czech squad in the 2011 FIFA U-17 World Cup in Mexico, where he was a scorer of both Czech goals. Czech Republic was knocked out in the group phase after one win and two defeats. Juliš represented the Czech Republic in the 2017 UEFA European Under-21 Championship in Poland. The team was knocked out in the group phase after one win and two defeats.

== Career statistics ==
As of 28 July 2021

Appearances and goals by club, season and competition
Club	Season	League			Czech Cup		Continental		Other		Total	
Club	Season	Division	Apps	Goals	Apps	Goals	Apps	Goals	Apps	Goals	Apps	Goals
Sparta Prague	2013–14	Czech First League	5	1	3	0	—		—		8	1
Sparta Prague	2014–15	Czech First League	0	0	0	0	0	0	—		0	0
Sparta Prague	2015–16	Czech First League	20	5	4	0	9 (Note: Appearance(s) in UEFA Europa League)	3	—		33	8
Sparta Prague	2016–17	Czech First League	22	3	2	1	11 (Note: One appearance in UEFA Champions League, ten appearances in UEFA Europa League)	0	—		35	4
Sparta Prague	2017–18	Czech First League	2	0	0	0	1	0	—		3	0
Sparta Prague	2019–20	Czech First League	4	0	1	0	0	0	—		5	0
Sparta Prague	2020–21	Czech First League	25	12	2	0	6	5	—		33	17
Sparta Prague	2021–22	Czech First League	2	0	0	0	1 (Note: Appearance in UEFA Champions League)	0	—		3	0
Sparta Prague	Total		80	21	12	1	28	8	0	0	120	30
Bohemians (loan)	2018–19	Czech First League	7	0	1	1	—		—		8	1
Sigma Olomouc (loan)	2019–20	Czech First League	12	8	2	2	—		—		14	10
Career total			99	29	15	4	28	8	0	0	142	41

== Honours ==
Žilina

- Slovak Cup: 2025–26
