= Matěj Polidar =

Czech footballer (born 1999)

- Polidar with Jablonec in 2026

Personal information
- Date of birth: 20 December 1999 (age 26)
- Place of birth: Prague, Czech Republic
- Height: 1.79 m (5 ft 10 1/2 in)
- Position: Midfielder

Team information
- Current team: Jablonec
- Number: 21

Senior career*
| Years | Team | Apps | (Gls) |
| 2018–2019 | Příbram | 18 | (1) |
| 2019–2025 | Sparta Prague | 18 | (4) |
| 2019–2020 | → Příbram (loan) | 24 | (1) |
| 2022–2023 | → Jablonec (loan) | 30 | (7) |
| 2023–2024 | → Jablonec (loan) | 29 | (2) |
| 2024–2025 | → Jablonec (loan) | 24 | (4) |
| 2025– | Jablonec | 17 | (0) |

International career^{‡}
| 2019 | Czech Republic U20 | 1 | (0) |
- * Club domestic league appearances and goals as of 27 May 2026 ‡ National team caps and goals as of 21 January 2021

Matěj Polidar (born 20 December 1999) is a Czech professional footballer who plays as a midfielder for Czech First League club Jablonec.

== Club career ==
=== 1. FK Příbram ===
He made his debut for the first team on 17 March 2019 in the Czech First League match against SK Slavia Prague.

Since then he played in 18 league matches (scoring 1 goal) and in 1 Czech Cup match (without scoring a goal).

=== AC Sparta Prague ===
On 8 September 2019 he moved to AC Sparta Prague in Czech First League. He made his debut for the first team on 28 September 2020 in the Czech First League match against his former club 1. FK Příbram.

Since then he played in 5 league matches, 1 Czech Cup match and in 3 2020-21 UEFA Europa League group stage matches against LOSC Lille, AC Milan and Celtic Glasgow (without scoring a goal). He also played in 3 matches (scoring 2 goals) for the reserve team in Bohemian Football League (actual to 21 January 2021).

==== 1. FK Příbram (loan) ====
On 9 September 2019 he was loaned back to 1. FK Příbram in Czech First League. In one year long loan he played in 24 league matches scoring 1 goal.

==== FK Jablonec (loan) ====
On 20 June 2022, he was loaned to Jablonec in Czech First League.

On 21 July 2023, Polidar joined Jablonec on a one-year loan.

On 19 July 2024, he was loaned to Jablonec on a one-year loan.

=== FK Jablonec ===
On 22 July 2025, Polidar signed a multi-year contract with Jablonec.

== International career ==
He had played international football at under-20 level for Czech Republic U20. He played in 1 match without scoring a goal.

== Career statistics ==
=== Club ===
As of 2 June 2021

Appearances and goals by club, season and competition
| Club | Season | League | | | Cup | | Continental | | Other | | Total | |
| Club | Season | Division | Apps | Goals | Apps | Goals | Apps | Goals | Apps | Goals | Apps | Goals |
|---|---|---|---|---|---|---|---|---|---|---|---|---|
| Příbram | 2018–19 | Czech First League | 10 | 1 | — | | — | | — | | 10 | 1 |
| Příbram | 2019–20 | Czech First League | 8 | 0 | 1 | 0 | — | | — | | 9 | 0 |
| Příbram | Total | | 18 | 1 | 1 | 0 | — | | — | | 19 | 1 |
| Příbram (loan) | 2019–20 | Czech First League | 24 | 1 | — | | — | | — | | 24 | 1 |
| Sparta Prague | 2020–21 | Czech First League | 14 | 3 | 2 | 0 | 3 | 0 | — | | 19 | 3 |
| Career total | | | 56 | 5 | 3 | 0 | 3 | 0 | 0 | 0 | 62 | 5 |
