= Milan Heča =

Czech footballer

Personal information
- Date of birth: 21 March 1991 (age 35)
- Place of birth: Krumvíř, Czechoslovakia
- Height: 1.87 m (6 ft 2 in)
- Position: Goalkeeper

Team information
- Current team: Slovácko
- Number: 29

Senior career*
Years	Team	Apps	(Gls)
2009–2018	Slovácko	130	(0)
2018–2023	Sparta Prague	50	(0)
2023–	Slovácko	75	(0)

International career^{‡}
2011	Czech Republic U20	1	(0)
- * Club domestic league appearances and goals as of 25 May 2026 ‡ National team caps and goals as of 4 April 2014

Milan Heča (born 21 March 1991) is a Czech football player who currently plays for Slovácko as a goalkeeper.

== Club career ==
In July 2018, he joined Sparta Prague.

In May 2023, Heča rejoined Slovácko.

== International career ==
In March 2022 he was called up to the senior Czech Republic squad and was on the bench for the friendly against Wales.

== Career statistics ==
As of 2 June 2022

Club	Season	League			Cup		Continental		Other		Total	
Club	Season	Division	Apps	Goals	Apps	Goals	Apps	Goals	Apps	Goals	Apps	Goals
Slovácko	2010–11	Fortuna liga	3	0	—		—		—		3	0
Slovácko	2011–12	Fortuna liga	5	0	—		—		—		5	0
Slovácko	2012–13	Fortuna liga	1	0	1	0	—		—		2	0
Slovácko	2013–14	Fortuna liga	14	0	2	0	—		—		16	0
Slovácko	2014–15	Fortuna liga	30	0	3	0	—		—		33	0
Slovácko	2015–16	Fortuna liga	29	0	0	0	—		—		29	0
Slovácko	2016–17	Fortuna liga	21	0	1	0	—		—		22	0
Slovácko	2017–18	Fortuna liga	27	0	1	0	—		—		28	0
Slovácko	Total		130	0	8	0	—		—		138	0
Sparta Prague	2018–19	Fortuna liga	9	0	4	0	0	0	—		13	0
Sparta Prague	2019–20	Fortuna liga	24	0	3	0	0	0	—		27	0
Sparta Prague	2020–21	Fortuna liga	8	0	3	0	3	0	—		14	0
Sparta Prague	2021–22	Fortuna liga	9	0	4	0	0	0	—		13	0
Sparta Prague	Total		50	0	14	0	3	0	0	0	67	0
Career total			180	0	22	0	3	0	0	0	205	0

== Honours ==
=== Club ===
Sparta Prague

- Czech First League: 2022–23
