= Filip Souček =

Czech footballer

Personal information
- Date of birth: 18 September 2000 (age 26)
- Place of birth: Štěpánkovice, Czech Republic
- Height: 1.86 m (6 ft 1 in)
- Position: Midfielder

Team information
- Current team: Ružomberok
- Number: 10

Youth career
- Hlučín
- Opava

Senior career*
Years	Team	Apps	(Gls)
2019–2020	Opava	15	(0)
2020–2025	Sparta Prague	37	(1)
2020	→ Opava (loan)	8	(1)
2022–2023	→ Zbrojovka Brno (loan)	20	(1)
2023–2024	→ Jablonec (loan)	22	(0)
2024–2025	→ Slovácko (loan)	5	(0)
2025	→ Ružomberok (loan)	12	(2)
2025–2026	Tatran Prešov	19	(2)
2026–	Ružomberok	9	(0)
- * Club domestic league appearances and goals as of 22 September 2026

Filip Souček (born 18 September 2000) is a Czech footballer who plays as a midfielder for Slovak side Ružomberok.

== Club career ==
Souček began his career playing youth football for Hlučín, before moving to Opava. On 11 May 2019, Souček made his debut for Opava, coming on as an 84th-minute substitute in a 3–2 win against Dukla Prague.

On 11 February 2020, Sparta Prague signed Souček for a fee of 15 million Kč, loaning him back to Opava for the remainder of the 2019–20 season.

On 5 August 2022, Souček joined Zbrojovka Brno on a one-year loan.

On 21 July 2023, Souček joined Jablonec on a one-year loan.

On 16 January 2025, Souček joined Ružomberok on a half-year loan. He made his debut for the club in a 5–1 loss against league champions Slovan Bratislava, playing the full 90” minutes. Souček scored his first goal in a 2–1 win over FC Košice, scoring in the 81” minute to secure the 3 points for Ružomberok.

On 9 July 2025, Souček signed a two-year contract with Tatran Prešov.

On 4 July 2026, Souček signed a contract with Ružomberok.

== Career statistics ==
=== Club ===
As of 16 December 2021

Club	Season	League			Cup		Continental		Other		Total	
Club	Season	Division	Apps	Goals	Apps	Goals	Apps	Goals	Apps	Goals	Apps	Goals
Opava	2018–19	Czech First League	2	0	—		—		—		2	0
Opava	2019–20	Czech First League	13	0	2	0	—		—		15	0
Opava	Total		15	0	2	0	—		—		17	0
Opava (loan)	2019–20	Czech First League	8	1	—		—		—		8	1
Sparta Prague	2020–21	Czech First League	18	0	2	1	3	0	—		23	1
Sparta Prague	2021–22	Czech First League	19	1	3	0	3	0	—		25	1
Sparta Prague	Total		37	1	5	1	6	0	0	0	48	2
Career total			60	2	7	1	6	0	0	0	73	3
