= Jan Fortelný =

Czech footballer

Personal information
- Date of birth: 19 January 1999 (age 27)
- Place of birth: Prague, Czech Republic
- Height: 1.75 m (5 ft 9 in)
- Position: Midfielder

Team information
- Current team: Teplice
- Number: 8

Senior career*
Years	Team	Apps	(Gls)
2018–2024	Sparta Prague	1	(0)
2018–2019	→ Vlašim (loan)	21	(2)
2019–2020	→ Jihlava (loan)	28	(1)
2020	→ Teplice (loan)	6	(0)
2020	→ Sparta Prague B	3	(3)
2021	→ Teplice (loan)	13	(0)
2021–2022	→ Teplice (loan)	22	(4)
2023–2024	→ Sigma Olomouc (loan)	29	(1)
2024–2025	Jablonec	13	(0)
2025–	Teplice	10	(1)

International career
2014–2015	Czech Republic U16	4	(1)
2015	Czech Republic U17	3	(0)
2016–2017	Czech Republic U18	14	(3)
2017	Czech Republic U19	6	(1)
2018–2019	Czech Republic U20	8	(1)
- * Club domestic league appearances and goals as of 27 May 2026

Jan Fortelný (born 19 January 1999) is a Czech footballer who plays as a midfielder for Teplice.

== Club career ==
=== Youth level ===
On youth level, he played for AC Sparta Prague. He played in 4 2016-17 UEFA Youth League matches against OFK Titograd and Altinordu FK scoring 2 goals, also he played in 3 2017-18 UEFA Youth League matches against F91 Dudelange and RB Salzburg.

=== AC Sparta Prague ===
He made his debut for the first team on 20 September 2020 in the Czech First League match against FC Fastav Zlín.

Since then he played in 1 league match and in 1 Czech Cup match without scoring a goal (actual to 21 January 2021). He also played in 3 matches (scoring 3 goals) for reserve team in Bohemian Football League.

==== FC Sellier and Bellot Vlašim (loan) ====
On 17 August 2018 he was loaned to FC Sellier & Bellot Vlašim in Czech National Football League. In one year long loan he played in 21 league matches (scoring 2 goals) and in 2 Czech Cup matches (scoring 1 goal).

==== FC Vysočina Jihlava (loan) ====
On 11 July 2019 he was loaned to FC Vysočina Jihlava also in Czech National Football League. In one year long loan he played in 28 league matches scoring 1 goal, also he played in 1 Czech Cup match without scoring a goal.

==== FK Teplice (loan) ====
On 5 October 2020 he was loaned to FK Teplice in Czech First League. In 3 months long loan he played in 6 league matches without scoring a goal.

On 8 February 2021 he was loaned to FK Teplice again.

On 12 August 2021 he was loaned to FK Teplice once again.

==== SK Sigma Olomouc (loan) ====
On 2 January 2023 he was loaned to SK Sigma Olomouc for half a season.

=== FK Jablonec ===
On 19 July 2024, Fortelný signed a contract with FK Jablonec.

=== FK Teplice ===
On 8 September 2025, Fortelný signed a contract with FK Teplice.

== International career ==
He had played international football at under-16, 17, 18, 19 and 20 level for Czech Republic U16, Czech Republic U17, Czech Republic U18, Czech Republic U19 and Czech Republic U20. He played in 35 matches scoring 6 goals.
