= Michal Trávník =

Czech footballer

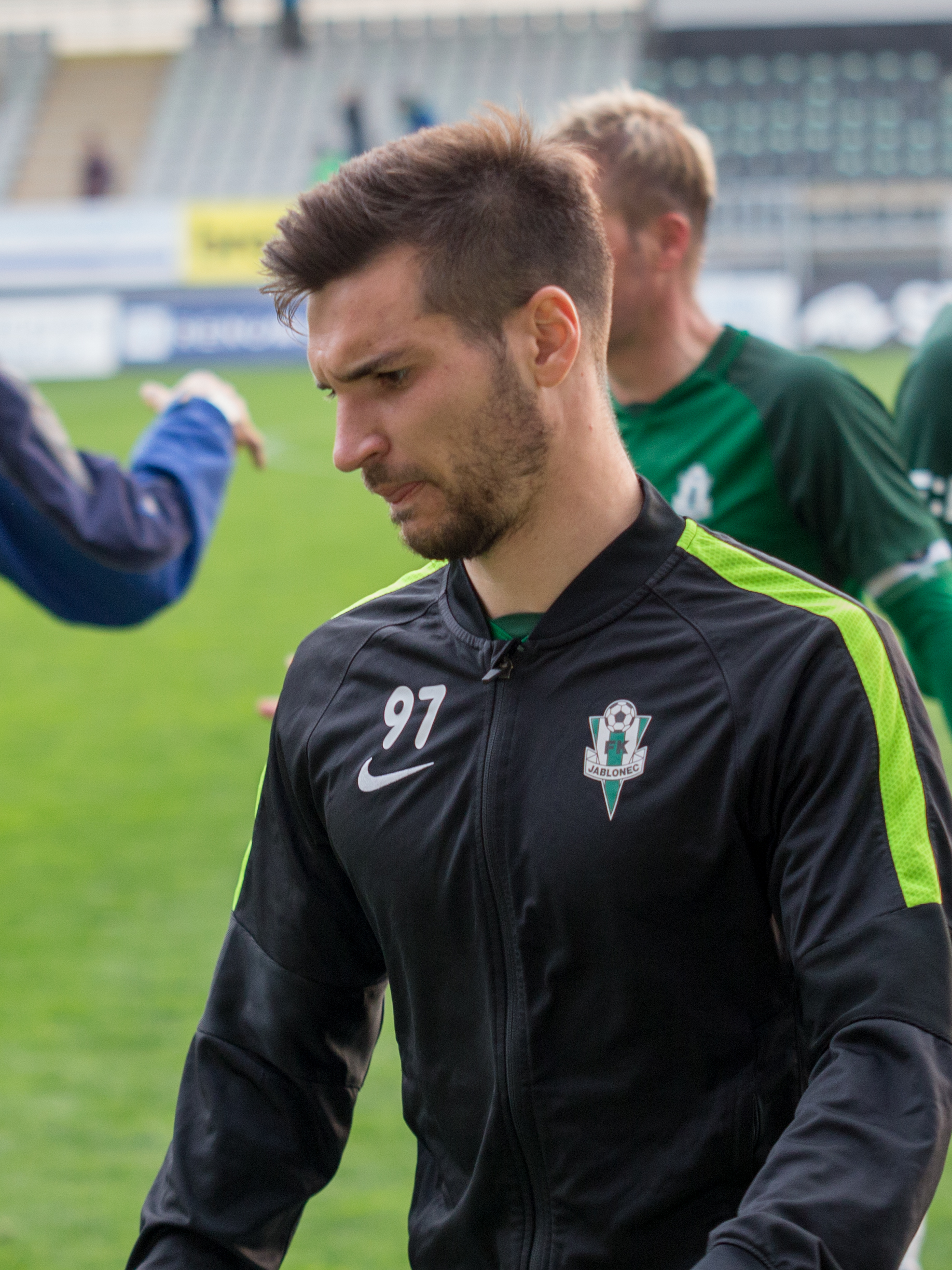
- Trávník with Jablonec in 2019

Personal information
- Date of birth: 17 May 1994 (age 32)
- Place of birth: Czech Republic
- Height: 1.74 m (5 ft 9 in)
- Position: Midfielder

Team information
- Current team: Slovácko
- Number: 10

Youth career
- Slovácko

Senior career*
Years	Team	Apps	(Gls)
2012–2015	Slovácko	55	(5)
2015–2019	Jablonec	112	(14)
2019–2023	Sparta Prague	45	(0)
2021–2022	→ Kasımpaşa (loan)	29	(3)
2022–2023	→ Slovácko (loan)	27	(2)
2023–	Slovácko	87	(4)

International career^{‡}
2011	Czech Republic U17	3	(0)
2012	Czech Republic U18	10	(0)
2012–2013	Czech Republic U19	16	(2)
2013	Czech Republic U20	3	(0)
2014–2017	Czech Republic U21	30	(3)
2018–	Czech Republic	5	(0)
- * Club domestic league appearances and goals as of 25 May 2026 ‡ National team caps and goals as of 16 November 2018

Michal Trávník (born 17 May 1994) is a Czech professional footballer who plays as a defensive midfielder for Slovácko and the Czech Republic national team.

== Club career ==
Trávník made his professional league debut for Slovácko in their 2–2 Czech First League draw at České Budějovice on 18 March 2012. He scored his first league goal in Slovácko's 2–0 home win against Znojmo on 10 May 2014. He moved to another Czech First League team, Jablonec, in July 2015.

On 17 July 2023, Trávník signed a thee-year contract with Slovácko.

== International career ==
Trávník played for the Czech Republic on all youth levels from Under-17 up and took part in the FIFA U-17 World Cup and the 2015 UEFA European Under-21 Championship. He made his debut for the senior Czech Republic team in their 0–2 loss to Uruguay in the 2018 China Cup.

== Career statistics ==
=== Club ===
As of 2 June 2022

Appearances and goals by club, season and competition
Club	Season	League			Cup		Continental		Other		Total	
Club	Season	Division	Apps	Goals	Apps	Goals	Apps	Goals	Apps	Goals	Apps	Goals
Slovácko	2011–12	Fortuna liga	7	0	—		—		—		7	0
Slovácko	2012–13	Fortuna liga	11	0	2	0	—		—		13	0
Slovácko	2013–14	Fortuna liga	13	1	1	0	—		—		14	1
Slovácko	2014–15	Fortuna liga	24	4	3	1	—		—		27	5
Slovácko	Total		55	5	6	1	—		—		61	6
Jablonec	2015–16	Fortuna liga	23	0	8	1	3	0	—		34	1
Jablonec	2016–17	Fortuna liga	28	2	2	0	—		—		30	2
Jablonec	2017–18	Fortuna liga	28	2	4	0	—		—		32	2
Jablonec	2018–19	Fortuna liga	33	10	1	0	6	2	—		40	12
Jablonec	Total		112	14	15	1	9	2	—		136	17
Sparta Prague	2019–20	Fortuna liga	28	0	5	0	1	0	—		34	0
Sparta Prague	2020–21	Fortuna liga	17	0	3	0	5	0	—		25	0
Sparta Prague	Total		45	0	8	0	6	0	0	0	59	0
Kasımpaşa (loan)	2021–22	Süper Lig	29	3	3	0	—		—		32	3
Career total			241	22	32	2	15	2	0	0	288	26
