= 2024–25 FC Viktoria Plzeň season =

FC Viktoria Plzeň
2024–25 season
- Manager: Miroslav Koubek
- Stadium: Doosan Arena
- Czech First League: 2nd
- Czech Cup: Semi-final
- UEFA Europa League: Round of 16
- Top goalscorer: League: Pavel Šulc (15); All: Pavel Šulc (20)
- Average home league attendance: 8,922
Home colours	Away colours	Third colours

The 2024–25 season was the 114th season in the history of FC Viktoria Plzeň, and the 20th consecutive season in Czech First League. In addition to the domestic league, the team participated in the Czech Cup and the UEFA Europa League.

== Transfers ==
=== In ===
Pos.	Player	Transferred from	Fee	Date	Source
MF	(Czech Republic) Tom Slončík	(Czech Republic) Zlín	Undisclosed	1 July 2024	
FW	(Czech Republic) Daniel Vašulín	(Czech Republic) Hradec Králové	Undisclosed	1 July 2024	
GK	(Austria) Florian Wiegele	(Austria) DSV Leoben	Undisclosed	1 July 2024	
DF	(Senegal) Cory Sène	(Austria) SV Lafnitz	Undisclosed	1 July 2024	
FW	(Brazil) Ricardinho	(Bulgaria) Levski Sofia	€1,200,000	3 July 2024	
MF	(Bosnia and Herzegovina) Amar Memić	(Czech Republic) Karviná	€150,000	1 January 2025	
DF	(Iraq) Merchas Doski	(Czech Republic) Slovácko	Undisclosed	1 January 2025	

=== Out ===
Pos.	Player	Transferred to	Fee	Date	Source
DF	(Czech Republic) Filip Čihák	(Czech Republic) Hradec Králové	Undisclosed	1 July 2024	
FW	(Czech Republic) Tomáš Chorý	(Czech Republic) Slavia Prague	€3,000,000	3 July 2024	
FW	(Slovakia) Erik Jirka	(Poland) Piast Gliwice	Undisclosed	1 January 2025	
MF	(Czech Republic) Jan Sýkora	(Czech Republic) Sigma Olomouc	Free	3 January 2025	
GK	(Austria) Florian Wiegele	(Austria) Grazer AK	Loan	5 January 2025	

== Friendlies ==
22 June 2024 Friendly	SK Petřín Plzeň	0–7	Viktoria Plzeň	Plzeň
10:30			Vašulín 3', 14', 18', 45'; Slončík 5', 9'; Metsoko 47'	Stadium: Stadion TJ Dynamo ZČE Plzeň; Attendance: 1,241

26 June 2024 Friendly	Viktoria Plzeň	2–1	Dukla Banská Bystrica	Město Touškov
17:00	Providence 48'; Sène 70'		Willwéber 45+1'	Stadium: Stadion Touškov

29 June 2024 Friendly	Viktoria Plzeň	6–0	SV Lafnitz	Plzeň
10:30	Vydra 3'; Kabongo 49', 65', 78'; Mosquera 52'; Bello 64'			Stadium: Stadion Luční ulice

5 July 2024 Friendly	Viktoria Plzeň	2–0	Karlsruher SC	Kufstein, Austria
13:30	Vašulín 6'; Bello 81'			Stadium: Kufstein-Arena

9 July 2024 Friendly	Viktoria Plzeň	1–2	Qarabağ	Westendorf, Austria
18:00	Kabongo 48'		Leandro Andrade 22', 44'	Stadium: Waldstadion Westendorf

12 July 2024 Friendly	Viktoria Plzeň	3–3	FC Copenhagen	Kufstein, Austria
16:00	Panoš 13'; Kabongo 16'; Vydra 69'		Óskarsson 4', 66'; Claesson 90+1'	Stadium: Kufstein-Arena

9 January 2025 Friendly	Viktoria Plzeň	2–2	Paderborn	Benidorm, Spain
15:00	Vydra 21'; Vašulín 35'	Report	Obermair 28'; Bilbija 39'	Stadium: Melia Villaitana Football Center

12 January 2025 Friendly	Viktoria Plzeň	2–0	Piast Gliwice	Benidorm, Spain
15:00	Marković (yellow card) 33'; Memić 59' 85'	Report	Szczepański (yellow card) 90'	Stadium: Melia Villaitana Football Center

16 January 2025 Friendly	Viktoria Plzeň	2–0	AIK	La Nucia, Spain
15:00	Adu 20'; Marković (yellow card) 25'; Kalvach (yellow card) 31'; Šulc 49'	Report	Emmanuel Gono (yellow card) 25'; Isherwood (yellow card) 31'	Stadium: Estadi Olímpic Camilo Cano

== Competitions ==
=== Overall record ===
Competition	First match	Last match	Starting round	Record							
Competition	First match	Last match	Starting round	Pld	W	D	L	GF	GA	GD	Win %
Czech First League	20 July 2024	19 April 2025	Matchday 1	2	2	0	0	4	1	+3	100.00
Czech Cup				0	0	0	0	0	0	+0	—
UEFA Europa League	8 August 2024		Third qualifying round	0	0	0	0	0	0	+0	—
Total				2	2	0	0	4	1	+3	100.00

Last updated: 28 July 2024
Source: Competitions

=== Czech First League ===
==== Regular season ====
Pos	Team	Pld	W	D	L	GF	GA	GD	Pts	Qualification or relegation
1	Slavia Prague	30	25	3	2	61	11	+50	78	Qualification for the championship group
2	Viktoria Plzeň	30	20	5	5	59	28	+31	65	Qualification for the championship group
3	Baník Ostrava	30	20	4	6	52	26	+26	64	Qualification for the championship group
4	Sparta Prague	30	19	5	6	56	33	+23	62	Qualification for the championship group
5	Jablonec	30	15	6	9	47	25	+22	51	Qualification for the championship group

Source: Chance Liga
Rules for classification: 1) Points; 2) Head-to-head points; 3) Head-to-head goal difference; 4) Head-to-head goals scored; 5) Goal difference; 6) Goals scored; 7) Fair-play ranking; 8) Draw.

==== Results summary ====
Overall								Home						Away					
Pld	W	D	L	GF	GA	GD	Pts	W	D	L	GF	GA	GD	W	D	L	GF	GA	GD
30	20	5	5	59	28	+31	65	11	2	2	35	15	+20	9	3	3	24	13	+11

Last updated: 19 April 2025.
Source: Chance Liga

==== Results by round ====
Round	1	2	3	4	5	6	7	8	9	10	11	12	13	14	15	16	17	18	19	20	21	22	23	24	25	26	27	28	29	30
Ground	A	H	A	H	A	H	A	H	A	H	H	A	H	A	H	A	H	A	H	A	H	A	H	A	A	H	A	H	A	H
Result	W	W	D	W	W	W	D	D	L	D	W	W	W	L	W	W	W	W	W	L	W	W	L	W	D	L	W	W	W	W
Position	2	2	4	2	2	1	3	3	3	3	3	3	2	2	2	2	2	2	2	2	2	2	2	2	3	4	3	2	2	2

Updated to match(es) played on 19 April 2025. Source: Chance Liga
A = Away; H = Home; W = Win; D = Draw; L = Loss

==== Matches ====
The match schedule was released on 20 June 2024.

20 July 2024 1	Dukla Prague	1–3	Viktoria Plzeň	Prague
20:00	Vondrášek (yellow card) 21'; Holiš (yellow card) 55'; Špatenka 81'		Dweh 19'; Šulc 30' (pen.); Peterka 68' (o.g.)	Stadium: Stadion Juliska; Referee: Jan Machálek

28 July 2024 2	Viktoria Plzeň	1–0	Hradec Králové	Plzeň
20:00				Stadium: Doosan Arena

3 August 2024 3	Jablonec	0–0	Viktoria Plzeň	Jablonec nad Nisou
17:00 CET	Beran (yellow card) 38'; Alégué (yellow card) 61'; Martinec (yellow card) 64'; Eduardo Nardini (yellow card) 78'	Report	Dweh (yellow card) 70'	Stadium: Stadion Střelnice; Attendance: 3,511; Referee: (Czech Republic) Jan Všetečka

11 August 2024 4	Viktoria Plzeň	5–0	Karviná	Plzeň
20:00 CET	Vašulín 23'; Tom Slončík 30'; Dweh (yellow card) 37'; Červ 58'; Šulc 63'; Sene (red card) 72'; Jirka 87' (pen.)	Report	Fleišman (yellow card) 22'; Patrik Čavoš (red card) 26'; Botos (yellow card) 54'; Andrija Ražnatović (yellow card) 86'; Dominik Žák (yellow card) 90+1'	Stadium: Doosan Arena; Attendance: 9,087; Referee: (Czech Republic) Ondřej Pechanec

18 August 2024 5	České Budějovice	0–3	Viktoria Plzeň	České Budějovice
17:00 CET	Hubínek (yellow card) 76'	Report	Jirka 31' (pen.); Cadu 50'; Kalvach 81'	Stadium: Stadion Střelecký ostrov Attendance: 4,528; Referee: (Czech Republic) Marek Radina

1 September 2024 7	Slovan Liberec	1–1	Viktoria Plzeň	Liberec
20:00 CET	Benjamin Nyarko (yellow card) 18'; Pourzitidis (yellow card) 58'; Tvrdoň 66' (o.g.); Zyba (yellow card) 90+5'	Report	Kalvach (yellow card) 17'; Adu (yellow card) 41'; Vydra 75'; Tom Slončík (yellow card) 89'	Stadium: Stadion u Nisy; Attendance: 3,174; Referee: (Czech Republic) Ondřej Pechanec

17 September 2024 6	Viktoria Plzeň	2–1	Sigma Olomouc	Plzeň
17:00 CET	Šulc 42' 55'; Červ (yellow card) 87'	Report	Jiří Sláma (yellow card) 31'; Štěpán Langer (yellow card) 41'; Adam Dohnálek (yellow card) 72'; Dele Israel (yellow card) 79'; Pokorný (yellow card) 84' (goal) 89'	Stadium: Doosan Arena; Attendance: 7,056; Referee: (Czech Republic) Dominik Starý

21 September 2024 9	Slavia Prague	3–0	Viktoria Plzeň	Prague
19:00 CET	Bořil 10'; Ogbu (yellow card) 19'; Douděra (yellow card) 45'; Chorý 45+1' (pen.); Provod 45+5'	Report	Marković (yellow card) 8'; Cadu (yellow card) 81'; Jemelka (yellow card) 87'	Stadium: Fortuna Arena; Attendance: 18,783; Referee: (Czech Republic) Dalibor Černý

29 September 2024 10	Viktoria Plzeň	1–1	Mladá Boleslav	Plzeň
15:30 CET	Adu 20'; Červ (red card) 85'	Report	Ladra 43'; Donát (red card) 51'; Kušej (yellow card) 90+3'	Stadium: Doosan Arena; Attendance: 8,611; Referee: (Czech Republic) Lukáš Nehasil

6 October 2024 11	Viktoria Plzeň	2–0	Pardubice	Plzeň
13:00 CET	Tom Slončík 56'; Alexandr Sojka (yellow card) 84'; Cadu (yellow card) 86'; Havel 90+3'	Report	Vojtěch Sychra (yellow card) 52'; Tomáš Zlatohlávek (yellow card) 54'	Stadium: Doosan Arena; Attendance: 7,224; Referee: (Czech Republic) Marek Radina

19 October 2024 12	Baník Ostrava	1–3	Viktoria Plzeň	Ostrava
16:00 CET	Šín 87'; Chaluš (yellow card) 88'	Report	Adu 5' 43'; Havel (yellow card) 17'; Jirka 89'	Stadium: Městský stadion Attendance: 10,888; Referee: (Czech Republic) Ondřej Berka

27 October 2024 13	Viktoria Plzeň	1–0	Sparta Prague	Plzeň
18:30 CET	Adu 30'; Jemelka (yellow card) 88'; Šulc (yellow card) 90+6'	Report	Kairinen (yellow card) 46'; Wiesner (yellow card) 73'; Suchomel (yellow card) 90+3'	Stadium: Doosan Arena; Attendance: 11,620; Referee: (Czech Republic) Karel Rouček

3 November 2024 14	Slovácko	1–0	Viktoria Plzeň	Uherské Hradiště
15:30 CET	Merchas Doski (yellow card) 34'; Ondřej Kukučka 64'; Havlík (yellow card) 81'; Jakub Křišťan (yellow card) 83'; Reinberk (yellow card) 90+2'	Report	Kalvach (yellow card) 73'; Mosquera (yellow card) 90+2'	Stadium: Městský fotbalový stadion Miroslava Valenty; Attendance: 4,854; Referee: (Czech Republic) Dominik Starý

10 November 2024 15	Viktoria Plzeň	2–0	Bohemians 1905	Plzeň
15:30 CET	Vydra 9'; Vašulín (yellow card) 40' (goal) 42'; Jemelka (yellow card) 86'	Report	Jan Vondra (yellow card) 14'	Stadium: Doosan Arena; Attendance: 8,825; Referee: (Czech Republic) Pavel Orel

23 November 2024 16	Hradec Králové	0–1	Viktoria Plzeň	Hradec Králové
19:00 CET	Klíma (yellow card) 80'; Petr Juliš (yellow card) 82'	Report	Kalvach (yellow card) 50'; Dweh 83'; Jedlička (yellow card) 90+1'	Stadium: Malšovická aréna Attendance: 6,005; Referee: (Czech Republic) Lukáš Nehasil

1 December 2024 17	Viktoria Plzeň	3–2	Jablonec	Plzeň
18:30 CET	Marković (yellow card) 15'; Vydra (yellow card) 45+5' (goal) 75'; Šulc 70' (pen.); Jemelka (yellow card) 77'; Kalvach 80'	Report	Alégué 2'; Hollý (yellow card) 17'; Nebyla (yellow card) 29' (goal) 45+2' (pen.); Souček (yellow card) 37'; Cedidla (red card) 68'	Stadium: Doosan Arena; Attendance: 6,084; Referee: (Czech Republic) Dominik Starý

5 December 2024 8	Viktoria Plzeň	1–1	Teplice	Plzeň
20:00 CET	Dweh 67'; Havel (yellow card) 68'	Report	Ondřej Kričfaluši (red card) 43'; Yehor Tsykalo 90+4'	Stadium: Doosan Arena; Attendance: 5,193; Referee: (Czech Republic) Dalibor Černý

8 December 2024 18	Karviná	1–2	Viktoria Plzeň	Karviná
13:00 CET	Memić 14'; Fleišman (yellow card) 63'	Report	Šulc 76' 86'	Stadium: Městský stadion Attendance: 2,438; Referee: (Czech Republic) Karel Rouček

15 December 2024 19	Viktoria Plzeň	7–2	České Budějovice	Plzeň
18:30 CET	Červ 2'; Kopic 15' 56' 77'; Vašulín 18' 59'; Vydra 28'; Dweh (yellow card) 50'; Jemelka (yellow card) 80'	Report	Čermák 12'; Ondřej Novák 58'; Tomáš Hák (yellow card) 71'	Stadium: Doosan Arena; Attendance: 5,820; Referee: (Czech Republic) Ondřej Pechanec

3 February 2025 20	Sigma Olomouc	2–1	Viktoria Plzeň	Olomouc
18:00 CET	Jakub Elbel 17'; Breite (yellow card) 20'; Zorvan 35' (pen.); Jan Koutný (yellow card) 76'; Yunusa Muritala (yellow card) 85'	Report	Dweh 11' (yellow card) 12'; Marković (yellow card) 34'; Jemelka (yellow card) 65'	Stadium: Andrův stadion Attendance: 3,485; Referee: (Czech Republic) Dalibor Černý

8 February 2025 21	Viktoria Plzeň	3–2	Slovan Liberec	Plzeň
19:00 CET	Havel 8'; Adu 11'; Hejda (yellow card) 47'; Marković (yellow card) 82' (goal) 85'; Jedlička (yellow card) 90+4'; Jemelka (yellow card) 90+6'	Report	Višinský 13'; Hlavatý 67'; Koubek (red card) 74'; Ghali (yellow card) 90'	Stadium: Doosan Arena; Attendance: 7,398; Referee: (Czech Republic) Jan Beneš

16 February 2025 22	Teplice	0–2	Viktoria Plzeň	Teplice
15:30 CET	Michal Bílek (yellow card) 73'	Report	Vašulín (yellow card) 41'; Durosinmi 42' 45'; Jemelka (yellow card) 74'	Stadium: AGC Aréna Na Stínadlech; Attendance: 3,025; Referee: (Czech Republic) Dominik Starý

23 February 2025 23	Viktoria Plzeň	1–3	Slavia Prague	Plzeň
18:30 CET	Šulc 19' (pen.)	Report	Chorý 2' 42' (pen.); Ogbu 47' (yellow card) 84'	Stadium: Doosan Arena; Attendance: 11,113; Referee: (Czech Republic) Karel Rouček

2 March 2025 24	Mladá Boleslav	0–2	Viktoria Plzeň	Mladá Boleslav
15:30 CET	Nicolas Penner (yellow card) 55'	Report	Memić 13'; Kalvach 80'	Stadium: Lokotrans Aréna; Attendance: 3,460; Referee: (Czech Republic) Ondřej Berka

9 March 2025 25	Pardubice	0–0	Viktoria Plzeň	Pardubice
18:30 CET	Vacek (yellow card) 41'; Filip Brdička (yellow card) 86'	Report	Durosinmi (yellow card) 80'	Stadium: CFIG Arena; Attendance: 1,963; Referee: (Czech Republic) Ondřej Pechanec

==== Championship round ====
Pos	Team	Pld	W	D	L	GF	GA	GD	Pts	Qualification or relegation
1	Slavia Prague (C)	35	29	3	3	77	18	+59	90	Qualification for the Champions League league phase
2	Viktoria Plzeň	35	23	5	7	71	36	+35	74	Qualification for the Champions League second qualifying round
3	Baník Ostrava	35	22	5	8	58	34	+24	71	Qualification for the Europa League second qualifying round
4	Sparta Prague	35	19	6	10	61	44	+17	63	Qualification for the Conference League second qualifying round
5	Jablonec	35	19	6	10	60	33	+27	63	
6	Sigma Olomouc	35	12	9	14	48	53	−5	45	Qualification for the Europa League play-off round (Note: The winner of the 2024–25 Czech Cup (Sigma Olomouc) qualifies for the Europa League play-off round.)

Source: Chance Liga
Rules for classification: 1) Total points; 2) Points earned in regular season; 3) Head-to-head points (regular season); 4) Head-to-head goal difference (regular season); 5) Head-to-head goals scored (regular season); 5) Goal difference (all matches); 6) Goals scored (all matches); 7) Fair-play ranking; 8) Draw.
(C) Champions

=== Czech Cup ===
30 October 2024 Third round	Ústí nad Labem	3–4	Viktoria Plzeň	Ústí nad Labem
16:30 CET	Daniel Richter 16'; David Černý 83'; Filip Novotný 85'	Report	Valenta (yellow card) 10'; Vašulín 13' 56'; Kopic 18'; Jan Paluska 45+1'	Stadium: Městský stadion Attendance: 2,430; Referee: (Czech Republic) Jan Petřík

27 February 2025 Fourth round	Viktoria Plzeň	4–1 (a.e.t.)	Zlín	Plzeň
18:00 CET	Panoš (yellow card) 12'; Jemelka 33'; Hejda (yellow card) 41'; Durosinmi 93'; Kopic 104' 119'	Report	Kanu 1'; Dostál (yellow card) 39'	Stadium: Doosan Arena; Attendance: 4,724; Referee: (Czech Republic) Ondřej Pechanec

=== UEFA Europa League ===
==== Third qualifying round ====
8 August 2024 First leg	Kryvbas Kryvyi Rih (Ukraine)	1–2	(Czech Republic) Viktoria Plzeň	Košice
20:00 CEST	Adu (yellow card) 17' (goal) 20'; Dibango (yellow card) 63'; Vakulko (yellow card) 74'	Report	Panoš (yellow card) 32' (goal) 48'; Vašulín 69' (yellow card) 74'	Stadium: Košická futbalová aréna Attendance: 1,800; Referee: (Austria) Sebastian Gishamer

15 August 2024 Second leg	Viktoria Plzeň (Czech Republic)	1–0 (3–1 agg.)	(Ukraine) Kryvbas Kryvyi Rih	Plzeň
19:00 CEST	Vašulín 52'	Report	Klishchuk (yellow card) 15'; Stetskov (yellow card) 43'; Khomchenovskyi (yellow card) 76'; Adu (yellow card) 89'	Stadium: Doosan Arena; Attendance: 10,657; Referee: (Romania) Horațiu Feșnic

==== Play-off round ====
22 August 2024 First leg	Viktoria Plzeň (Czech Republic)	1–0	(Scotland) Hearts	Plzeň
19:00 CEST	Jemelka (yellow card) 69'; Kalvach (yellow card) 90+1'; Oyegoke 90+6' (o.g.)	Report	Devlin (yellow card) 22'; Vargas (yellow card) 36'; Oyegoke (yellow card) 90+8'	Stadium: Doosan Arena; Attendance: 10,506; Referee: (Germany) Sven Jablonski

29 August 2024 Second leg	Hearts (Scotland)	0–1 (0–2 agg.)	(Czech Republic) Viktoria Plzeň	Edinburgh
19:45	Grant (yellow card) 57'; Taylor (yellow card) 90+4'; Kent (yellow card) 90+4'	Report	Červ 76'	Stadium: Tynecastle Park; Attendance: 18,164; Referee: (Bulgaria) Georgi Kabakov

==== League phase ====
The draw for the league phase was held on 30 August 2024.

Pos	Team	Pld	W	D	L	GF	GA	GD	Pts	Qualification
14	(Turkish Football Federation) Galatasaray	8	3	4	1	19	16	+3	13	Advance to knockout phase play-offs (seeded)
15	(Italian Football Federation) Roma	8	3	3	2	10	6	+4	12	Advance to knockout phase play-offs (seeded)
16	(Football Association of the Czech Republic) Viktoria Plzeň	8	3	3	2	13	12	+1	12	Advance to knockout phase play-offs (seeded)
17	(Hungarian Football Federation) Ferencváros	8	4	0	4	15	15	0	12	Advance to knockout phase play-offs (unseeded)
18	(Portuguese Football Federation) Porto	8	3	2	3	13	11	+2	11	Advance to knockout phase play-offs (unseeded)

Source: UEFA
Rules for classification: League phase tiebreakers

26 September 2024 Match 1	Eintracht Frankfurt (Germany)	3–3	(Czech Republic) Viktoria Plzeň	Frankfurt
21:00 CET	Ekitike 38'; Dina Ebimbe 62'; Kristensen 67'	Report	Šulc 41'; Adu 86'; Jemelka 90+2'	Stadium: Deutsche Bank Park; Attendance: 56,500; Referee: (Ukraine) Mykola Balakin

3 October 2024 Match 2	Viktoria Plzeň (Czech Republic)	0–0	(Bulgaria) Ludogorets	Plzeň
21:00 CET	Kalvach (yellow card) 46'; Šulc (yellow card) 79'	Report	Son (yellow card) 90+2'; Rick (yellow card) 90+3'; Pedro Naressi (yellow card) 90+6'	Stadium: Doosan Arena; Attendance: 10,317; Referee: (Hungary) Tamás Bognár

24 October 2024 Match 3	PAOK (Greece)	2–2	(Czech Republic) Viktoria Plzeň	Thessaloniki
19:45 EET	Tissoudali (yellow card) 82' (goal) 84'; Baba Rahman 90+3'	Report	Dweh (yellow card) 11' (yellow-red card) 70'; Havel 31'; Vydra 39'; Marković (yellow card) 41'; Adu (yellow card) 70'; Jedlička (yellow card) 90'	Stadium: Toumba Stadium; Attendance: 16,144; Referee: (Switzerland) Urs Schnyder

7 November 2024 Match 4	Viktoria Plzeň (Czech Republic)	2–1	(Spain) Real Sociedad	Plzeň
21:00 CET	Adu 13'; Jan Paluska (yellow card) 37'; Červ (yellow card) 56'; Vašulín 89'; Havel (yellow card) 90+6'	Report	Óskarsson 35'; Zubeldia (yellow card) 42'; Mikel Oyarzabal (yellow card) 72'; Aramburu (yellow card) 90+6'; Sučić (yellow card) 90+7'; Aguerd (yellow card) 90+8'	Stadium: Doosan Arena; Attendance: 11,130; Referee: (Latvia) Andris Treimanis

28 November 2024 Match 5	Dynamo Kyiv (Ukraine)	1–2	(Czech Republic) Viktoria Plzeň	Hamburg
18:45 CET	Brazhko (yellow card) 68'; Kabayev 90+5'	Report	Marković (yellow card) 45'; Vydra 55'; Havel (yellow card) 79'; Šulc 90'	Stadium: Volksparkstadion; Attendance: 4,456; Referee: (Portugal) Luis Godinho

12 December 2024 Match 6	Viktoria Plzeň (Czech Republic)	1–2	(England) Manchester United	Plzeň
18:45 CET	Vydra 48'	Report	Rashford (yellow card) 45+1'; Højlund 62' 88'; de Ligt (yellow card) 81'; Mazraoui (yellow card) 90+2'	Stadium: Doosan Arena; Attendance: 11,320; Referee: (Romania) Marian Barbu

23 January 2025 Match 7	Viktoria Plzeň (Czech Republic)	2–0	(Belgium) Anderlecht	Plzeň
18:45 CET	Červ 3'; Adu 45'	Report		Stadium: Doosan Arena; Attendance: 10,972; Referee: (Portugal) António Nobre

30 January 2025 Match 8	Athletic Bilbao (Spain)	3–1	(Czech Republic) Viktoria Plzeň	Bilbao
21:00 CET	Nico Williams 25'; Álex Berenguer (yellow card) 31'; Yeray 64'; Álvaro Djaló (yellow card) 84'; Javier Martón 90+5'	Report	Adu (yellow card) 21'; Dweh (yellow card) 63'; Havel 71'; Vašulín (red card) 89'	Stadium: San Mamés; Attendance: 45,471; Referee: (Slovenia) Matej Jug

==== Knockout phase play-offs ====
13 February 2025 First leg	Ferencváros (Hungary)	1–0	(Czech Republic) Viktoria Plzeň	Budapest
18:45 CET	Abu Fani 23'; Varga (yellow card) 89'	Report		Stadium: Ferencváros Stadion; Attendance: 18,519; Referee: (Georgia (country)) Giorgi Kruashvili

20 February 2025 Second Leg	Viktoria Plzeň (Czech Republic)	3–0 (3–1 agg.)	(Hungary) Ferencváros	Plzeň
21:00 CET	Jemelka 27'; Šulc 35'; Durosinmi 38'; Memić (yellow card) 45+2'; Dweh (yellow card) 76'	Report	Matheus Saldanha (yellow card) 14'; Abu Fani (yellow card) 56'	Stadium: Doosan Arena; Attendance: 10,415; Referee: (France) Jérôme Brisard

==== Round of 16 ====
The draw for the round of 16 was held on 21 February 2025.

6 March 2025 First Leg	Viktoria Plzeň (Czech Republic)	1–2	(Italy) Lazio	Plzeň
21:00 CET	Durosinmi 53'; Kalvach (yellow card) 61'; Cadu (yellow card) 71'; Červ (yellow card) 75'	Report	Romagnoli 18'; Vecino (yellow card) 62'; Rovella (red card) 77'; Patric (yellow card) 83'; Gigot (red card) 90+3'; Isaksen 90+8'	Stadium: Doosan Arena; Attendance: 11,236; Referee: (Lithuania) Donatas Rumšas

13 March 2025 Second Leg	Lazio (Italy)	1–1 (3–2 agg.)	(Czech Republic) Viktoria Plzeň	Rome
18:45 CET	Marušić (yellow card) 3'; Vecino (yellow card) 69'; Romagnoli 77'	Report	Dweh (yellow card) 1'; Durosinmi (yellow card) 39'; Šulc 52'	Stadium: Stadio Olimpico; Attendance: 39,547; Referee: (Netherlands) Danny Makkelie
