= 2025–26 FC Viktoria Plzeň season =

FC Viktoria Plzeň
2025–26 season
- Manager: Miroslav Koubek (until 29 September); Marek Bakoš (until 15 October); Martin Hyský (from 15 October)
- Stadium: Doosan Arena
- Czech First League: 3rd place, bronze medalist(s)
- Czech Cup: Quarter-finals
- UEFA Champions League: Third qualifying round
- UEFA Europa League: Knockout phase
- Top goalscorer: League: Rafiu Durosinmi (7); All: Rafiu Durosinmi (13)
- Average home league attendance: 9,119
- Biggest win: 5–0 vs Mladá Boleslav (A); 19 August 2025, Czech First League
- Biggest defeat: 0–3 vs Slovácko (A); 6 December 2025, Czech First League, 0–3 vs Zlín (A); 1 March 2026, Czech First League, 0–3 vs Slavia Prague (A); 26 May 2026, Czech First League
Home colours	Away colours	Third colours
- All statistics correct as of 26 May 2026.

The 2025–26 season is the 115th season in the history of FC Viktoria Plzeň, and the 21st consecutive season in the Czech First League. In addition to the domestic league, the team is participating in the Czech Cup and the UEFA Europa League, having been eliminated in the third qualifying round of the UEFA Champions League.

== Transfers ==
=== In ===
Date	Pos.	Player	From	Fee	Ref.
1 July 2025	MF	(Czech Republic) Denis Višinský	(Czech Republic) Slovan Liberec	Undsiclosed	
1 July 2025	MF	(Czech Republic) Tomáš Ladra	(Czech Republic) Mladá Boleslav	Undisclosed	
1 July 2025	MF	(Slovenia) Adrian Zeljković	(Slovakia) FC Spartak Trnava	Undisclosed	

=== Out ===
Date	Pos.	Player	To	Fee	Ref.
18 June 2025	MF	(Czech Republic) Lukáš Kalvach	Qatar SC	Free transfer	
19 June 2025	FW	(Brazil) Ricardinho	(Kazakhstan) Kairat	Loan	
1 July 2025	MF	(Brazil) Cadu	(Hungary) Ferencváros	Free transfer	
1 July 2025	MF	(Czech Republic) Roman Květ	(Belgium) Dender	Undisclosed	
4 August 2025	MF	(Czech Republic) Pavel Šulc	(France) Lyon	€7,500,000	
14 January 2026	FW	(Nigeria) Rafiu Durosinmi	(Italy) Pisa	Undisclosed	

== Competitions ==
=== Czech First League ===
==== Regular season ====
Pos	Team	Pld	W	D	L	GF	GA	GD	Pts	Qualification or relegation
1	Slavia Prague	30	21	8	1	63	23	+40	71	Qualification for the championship group
2	Sparta Prague	30	19	6	5	60	33	+27	63	Qualification for the championship group
3	Viktoria Plzeň	30	15	8	7	50	34	+16	53	Qualification for the championship group
4	Jablonec	30	15	6	9	41	33	+8	51	Qualification for the championship group
5	Hradec Králové	30	14	7	9	43	34	+9	49	Qualification for the championship group

Source: Chance Liga
Rules for classification: 1) Points; 2) Head-to-head points; 3) Head-to-head goal difference; 4) Head-to-head goals scored; 5) Goal difference; 6) Goals scored; 7) Fair-play ranking; 8) Draw.

==== Results summary ====
Overall								Home						Away					
Pld	W	D	L	GF	GA	GD	Pts	W	D	L	GF	GA	GD	W	D	L	GF	GA	GD
30	15	8	7	50	34	+16	53	7	5	3	24	17	+7	8	3	4	26	17	+9

Last updated: complete.
Source: Chance Liga

==== Results by round ====
Round	1	2	3	4	5	6	7	8	9	10	11	12	13	14	15	16	17	18	19	20	21	22	23	24	25	26	27	28	29	30
Ground	A	H	H	A	A	H	A	H	A	H	H	A	H	A	H	A	H	A	H	A	H	A	H	A	A	H	A	H	A	H
Result	W	D	D	L	W	W	D	W	L	L	D	W	W	W	L	D	W	L	W	W	W	W	D	L	W	W	W	D	D	L
Position	1	2	8	8	7	5	6	4	5	5	6	4	4	4	5	6	5	5	4	4	4	4	4	4	3	3	3	3	3	3

Source: Chance Liga
A = Away; H = Home; W = Win; D = Draw; L = Loss

=== Czech Cup ===
16 September 2025 Third round	TJ Sokol Lanžhot	1–6	Viktoria Plzeň	Stadion Na Šlajsi
16:00	Balážik 45+1'; Buchta (yellow card) 69'		Vydra 10'; Kabongo 25'; Spáčil 48'; Bello 65'; Durosinmi 70'; Ladra 81'	Attendance: 2,952; Referee: Simon Vejtasa

29 October 2025 Fourth round	FK Nové Sady	0–2	Viktoria Plzeň	Stadion FK Nové Sady
14:00			Durosinmi 75'; Červ 90+4'	Attendance: 1,610; Referee: Daniel Vokoun

4 March 2026 Quarter-final	MFK Karviná	3–0	Viktoria Plzeň	Městský stadion
17:00	Ayaosi 24'; Labik 39'; Kačor 76'			Attendance: 2,023; Referee: Pavel Orel

=== UEFA Champions League ===
==== Second qualifying round ====
The draw for the second qualifying round was held on 18 June 2025.

22 July 2025 First leg	Viktoria Plzeň (Czech Republic)	0–1	(Switzerland) Servette	Doosan Arena, Plzeň
19:00		Report	Mráz 13'	Attendance: 11,055; Referee: Nikola Dabanović (Montenegro)

30 July 2025 Second leg	Servette (Switzerland)	1–3 (2–3 agg.)	(Czech Republic) Viktoria Plzeň	Stade de Genève, Geneva
21:00	Antunes 4'	Report	Spáčil 28'; Vydra 31'; Durosinmi 87' (pen.)	Attendance: 11,716; Referee: Alejandro Muñiz Ruiz (Spain)

==== Third qualifying round ====
The draw for the third qualifying round was held on 21 July 2025.

5 August 2025 First leg	Rangers (Scotland)	3–0	(Czech Republic) Viktoria Plzeň	Ibrox Stadium, Glasgow
20:45 (19:45 UTC+1)	Gassama 15', 51'; Dessers 45' (pen.)	Report		Attendance: 45,730; Referee: Clément Turpin (France)

12 August 2025 Second leg	Viktoria Plzeň (Czech Republic)	2–1 (2–4 agg.)	(Scotland) Rangers	Doosan Arena, Plzeň
19:00	Durosinmi 41'; Marković 83'	Report	Cameron 61'	Attendance: 11,341; Referee: Szymon Marciniak (Poland)

=== UEFA Europa League ===
==== League phase ====
The draw for the league stage was held on 29 August 2025.

Pos	Team	Pld	W	D	L	GF	GA	GD	Pts	Qualification
12	(Hungarian Football Federation) Ferencváros	8	4	3	1	12	11	+1	15	Advance to knockout phase play-offs (seeded)
13	(The Football Association) Nottingham Forest	8	4	2	2	15	7	+8	14	Advance to knockout phase play-offs (seeded)
14	(Football Association of the Czech Republic) Viktoria Plzeň	8	3	5	0	8	3	+5	14	Advance to knockout phase play-offs (seeded)
15	(Football Association of Serbia) Red Star Belgrade	8	4	2	2	7	6	+1	14	Advance to knockout phase play-offs (seeded)
16	(Royal Spanish Football Federation) Celta Vigo	8	4	1	3	15	11	+4	13	Advance to knockout phase play-offs (seeded)

Source: UEFA
Rules for classification: League phase tiebreakers

Round	1	2	3	4	5	6	7	8
Ground	A	H	A	H	H	A	H	A
Result	D	W	W	D	D	D	D	W
Position	17	8	5	8	13	14	17	14
Points	1	4	7	8	9	10	11	14

Source: UEFA
A = Away; H = Home; W = Win; D = Draw; L = Loss

===== Matches =====
Win Draw Loss Fixtures

25 September 2025 1	Ferencváros (Hungary)	1–1	(Czech Republic) Viktoria Plzeň	Ferencváros Stadion, Budapest
21:00	Makreckis (yellow card) 10' (yellow-red card) 38'; Cissé (yellow card) 90+1'; Pešić 90+4' (yellow card) 90+5'	Report	Durosinmi (yellow card) 15' (goal) 17'; Jemelka (yellow card) 74'	Referee: Sander van der Eijk (Netherlands)

2 October 2025 2	Viktoria Plzeň (Czech Republic)	3–0	(Sweden) Malmö FF	Doosan Arena, Plzeň
18:45	Vydra 34'; Durosinmi 44'; Spáčil 53'	Report		Attendance: 10,811; Referee: Enea Jorgji (Albania)

23 October 2025 3	Roma (Italy)	1–2	(Czech Republic) Viktoria Plzeň	Stadio Olimpico, Rome
21:00	Dybala 54' (pen.); Çelik (yellow card) 56'; Mancini (yellow card) 80'	Report	Adu 20'; Souaré 22', (yellow card) 60'; Durosinmi (yellow card) 30'; Spáčil (yellow card) 67'; Červ (yellow card) 75'; Višinský (yellow card) 90+5'	Attendance: 52,263; Referee: Halil Umut Meler (Turkey)

6 November 2025 4	Viktoria Plzeň (Czech Republic)	0–0	(Turkey) Fenerbahçe	Doosan Arena, Plzeň
21:00		Report		Attendance: 11,090; Referee: Allard Lindhout (Netherlands)

27 November 2025 5	Viktoria Plzeň (Czech Republic)	0–0	(Germany) SC Freiburg	Doosan Arena, Plzeň
18:45		Report		Attendance: 10,182; Referee: Morten Krogh (Denmark)

11 December 2025 6	Panathinaikos (Greece)	0–0	(Czech Republic) Viktoria Plzeň	Olympic Stadium, Athens
21:00 (22:00 UTC+2)		Report		Attendance: 17,335; Referee: António Nobre (Portugal)

22 January 2026 7	Viktoria Plzeň (Czech Republic)	1–1	(Portugal) Porto	Doosan Arena, Plzeň
18:45	Červ 6'	Report	Gül 90'	Attendance: 11,108; Referee: Andris Treimanis (Latvia)

29 January 2026 8	Basel (Switzerland)	0–1	(Czech Republic) Viktoria Plzeň	St. Jakob-Park, Basel
21:00		Report	Panoš 39'	Attendance: 20,454; Referee: Giorgi Kruashvili (Georgia)

==== Knockout phase play-offs ====
19 February 2026 First leg	Panathinaikos (Greece)	2–2	(Czech Republic) Viktoria Plzeň	Olympic Stadium, Athens
21:00	Tetteh 31', 61'	Report	Višinský 11'; Ladra 80'	Attendance: 20,227; Referee: Nick Walsh (Scotland)

26 February 2026 Second leg	Viktoria Plzeň (Czech Republic)	1–1 (a.e.t.) (3–4 p)	(Greece) Panathinaikos	Doosan Arena, Plzeň
18:45	Spáčil 62'	Report	Tetteh 9'	Attendance: 11,244; Referee: Donatas Rumšas (Lithuania)
	Penalties
	Memić (penalty missed); Hrošovský (penalty scored); Višinský (penalty scored); Souaré (penalty missed); Valenta (penalty scored)		(penalty missed) Calabria; (penalty scored) Pellistri; (penalty scored) Đuričić; (penalty scored) Świderski; (penalty scored) Pantović
