= Martin Jedlička =

Czech footballer

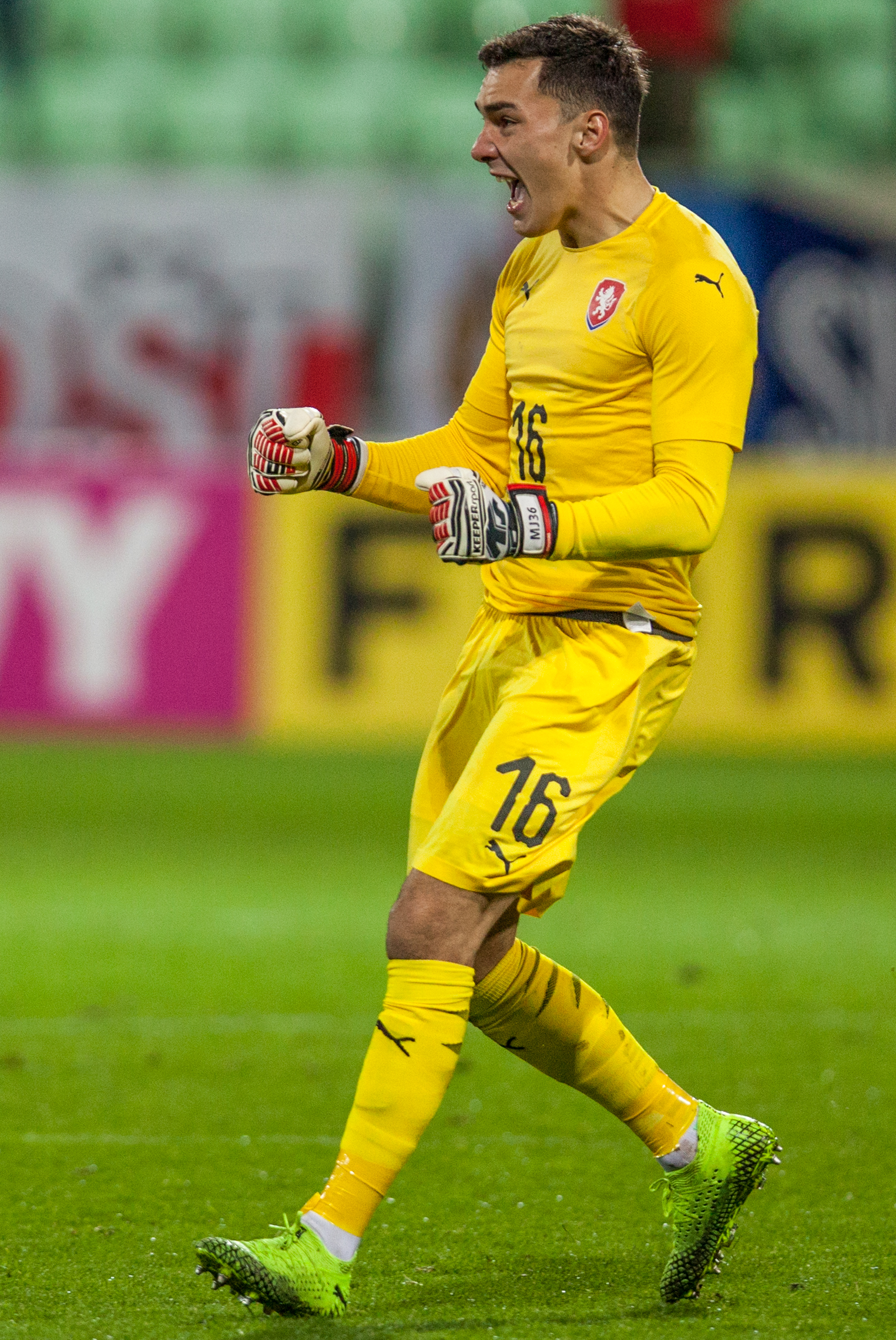
- Jedlička with the Czech Republic in 2019

Personal information
- Full name: Martin Jedlička
- Date of birth: 24 January 1998 (age 28)
- Place of birth: Příbram, Czech Republic
- Height: 1.87 m (6 ft 2 in)
- Position: Goalkeeper

Team information
- Current team: Baník Ostrava
- Number: 23

Youth career
- Příbram
- → Sparta Prague (loan)
- 2017: Mladá Boleslav

Senior career*
Years	Team	Apps	(Gls)
2017–2019	Mladá Boleslav	1	(0)
2018–2019	→ Dunajská Streda (loan)	29	(0)
2019–2022	DAC Dunajská Streda	74	(0)
2022–2026	Viktoria Plzeň	59	(0)
2022–2023	→ Bohemians (loan)	26	(0)
2026	→ Baník Ostrava (loan)	16	(0)
2026–	Baník Ostrava	0	(0)

International career^{‡}
2013–2014	Czech Republic U16	3	(0)
2014–2015	Czech Republic U17	10	(0)
2015–2016	Czech Republic U18	7	(0)
2016–2017	Czech Republic U19	13	(0)
2017–2018	Czech Republic U20	7	(0)
2019–2020	Czech Republic U21	10	(0)
2025–	Czech Republic	1	(0)
- * Club domestic league appearances and goals as of 25 May 2026 ‡ National team caps and goals as of 14 November 2025

Martin Jedlička (born 24 January 1998) is a Czech professional footballer who plays as a goalkeeper for Baník Ostrava and the Czech Republic national team.

== Biography ==
On 3 December 2017, Jedlička made his league debut for Mladá Boleslav in a Czech First League match against Sparta Prague, ending in 0–3 loss for his club. He scored an own goal in the twelfth minute by misjudging Eidar Civić's cross, parrying the ball into the goalpost and deflecting it into his own net. This was the first Czech First League goal to be confirmed by video review.

On 21 February 2019, Jedlička signed for Slovak club DAC Dunajská Streda with a contract until 2022. He returned to the Czech Republic shortly afterwards, signing a three-year contract with Viktoria Plzeň. On 14 November 2025, Jedlička debuted for the Czech senior team in a 2026 FIFA World Cup qualification against San Marino, which ended in a 1–0 victory for the Czechs.

On 8 January 2026, Jedlička joined Baník Ostrava on a half-year loan deal.

== Career statistics ==
=== Club ===
As of 9 November 2025

Club	Season	League			Cup		Continental		Other		Total	
Club	Season	Division	Apps	Goals	Apps	Goals	Apps	Goals	Apps	Goals	Apps	Goals
Mladá Boleslav	2017–18	Czech First League	1	0	—		—		—		1	0
Dunajská Streda (loan)	2018–19	Fortuna Liga	29	0	3	0	0	0	—		32	0
Dunajská Streda	2019–20	Fortuna Liga	24	0	6	0	4	0	—		34	0
Dunajská Streda	2020–21	Fortuna Liga	31	0	1	0	3	0	—		35	0
Dunajská Streda	2021–22	Fortuna Liga	19	0	0	0	2	0	—		21	0
Dunajská Streda	Total		74	0	7	0	9	0	—		90	0
Viktoria Plzeň	2022–23	Czech First League	0	0	1	0	0	0	—		1	0
Viktoria Plzeň	2023–24	Czech First League	16	0	3	0	5	0	—		24	0
Viktoria Plzeň	2024–25	Czech First League	29	0	1	0	12	0	—		42	0
Viktoria Plzeň	2025–26	Czech First League	14	0	0	0	6	0	—		20	0
Viktoria Plzeň	Total		59	0	5	0	23	0	0	0	87	0
Bohemians (loan)	2022–23	Czech First League	15	0	2	0	—		—		17	0
Bohemians (loan)	2023–24	Czech First League	11	0	0	0	—		—		11	0
Bohemians (loan)	Total		26	0	0	0	—		—		28	0
Career total			189	0	17	0	32	0	0	0	238	0

=== International ===
As of match played 13 November 2025

Appearances and goals by national team and year
National team	Year	Apps	Goals
Czech Republic	2025	1	0
Total		1	0

== Honours ==
Individual

- Slovak Super Liga U-21 Team of the Season: 2019-20
