= Sampson Dweh =

Liberian footballer

Personal information
- Full name: Sampson Kargeoh Dweh Jr.
- Date of birth: 10 October 2001 (age 25)
- Place of birth: Monrovia, Liberia
- Height: 1.86 m (6 ft 1 in)
- Position: Center-back

Team information
- Current team: Viktoria Plzeň
- Number: 40

Senior career*
| Years | Team | Apps | (Gls) |
| 2021–2022 | LPRC Oilers | | |
| 2022–2024 | Vyškov | 9 | (1) |
| 2023–2024 | → Viktoria Plzeň (loan) | 30 | (2) |
| 2024– | Viktoria Plzeň | 72 | (8) |

International career^{‡}
| 2021– | Liberia | 40 | (1) |
- * Club domestic league appearances and goals as of 20 October 2026 ‡ National team caps and goals as of 21:00, 29 September 2026 (UTC)

Sampson Kargeoh Dweh Jr. (born 10 October 2001) is a Liberian professional footballer who plays as a center-back for Viktoria Plzeň and the Liberia national team.

== Career ==
On 22 July 2023, Dweh joined Viktoria Plzeň on a one-year loan with option. On 5 June 2024, Dweh signed a three-year contract with Viktoria Plzeň.

== Career statistics ==
=== Club ===
As of match played 20 September 2026

Appearances and goals by club, season and competition
| Club | Season | League | | | Cup | | Continental | | Other | | Total | |
| Club | Season | Division | Apps | Goals | Apps | Goals | Apps | Goals | Apps | Goals | Apps | Goals |
|---|---|---|---|---|---|---|---|---|---|---|---|---|
| LPRC Oilers | 2021–22 | Liberian First Division | — | | — | | 5 (Note: Four appearances in CAF Champions League, one appearance in CAF Confederation Cup) | 0 | — | | 5 | 0 |
| Vyškov | 2022–23 | Czech National Football League | 9 | 1 | 3 | 0 | — | | 2 (Note: Appearances in relegation play-offs) | 0 | 14 | 1 |
| Viktoria Plzeň (loan) | 2023–24 | Czech First League | 30 | 2 | 3 | 0 | 15 (Note: Appearances in UEFA Conference League) | 0 | — | | 48 | 2 |
| Viktoria Plzeň | 2024–25 | Czech First League | 34 | 5 | 4 | 0 | 15 (Note: Appearances in UEFA Europa League) | 0 | — | | 53 | 5 |
| Viktoria Plzeň | 2025–26 | Czech First League | 27 | 1 | 2 | 0 | 13 (Note: Four appearances in UEFA Champions League, nine appearances in UEFA Europa League) | 0 | — | | 42 | 1 |
| Viktoria Plzeň | 2026–27 | Czech First League | 9 | 1 | 0 | 0 | 3 | 0 | — | | 12 | 1 |
| Viktoria Plzeň | Total | | 70 | 7 | 6 | 0 | 31 | 0 | — | | 107 | 7 |
| Career total | | | 109 | 10 | 12 | 0 | 51 | 0 | 2 | 0 | 174 | 10 |

=== International ===
As of match played 29 September 2026

Appearances and goals by national team and year
| National team | Year | Apps | Goals |
|---|---|---|---|
| Liberia | 2021 | 9 | 0 |
| Liberia | 2022 | 6 | 0 |
| Liberia | 2023 | 7 | 0 |
| Liberia | 2024 | 10 | 1 |
| Liberia | 2025 | 4 | 0 |
| Liberia | 2026 | 4 | 0 |
| Total | | 40 | 1 |

Scores and results list Liberia's goal tally first

List of international goals scored by Sampson Dweh
| No. | Date | Venue | Opponent | Score | Result | Competition |
|---|---|---|---|---|---|---|
| 1 | 17 November 2024 | Hocine Aït Ahmed Stadium, Boukhalfa, Algeria | Algeria | 0–1 | 5–1 | 2025 Africa Cup of Nations qualification |
