= 2023–24 FC Viktoria Plzeň season =

Czech football team season

FC Viktoria Plzeň
2023–24 season
- Manager: Miroslav Koubek
- Stadium: Doosan Arena
- Czech First League: 3rd
- Czech Cup: Runners-up
- Europa Conference League: Quarter-finals
- Top goalscorer: League: Pavel Šulc (8); All: Pavel Šulc (12)
- Average home league attendance: 9,030
Home colours	Away colours	Third colours

The 2023–24 season was the FC Viktoria Plzeň's 113th year in existence and 19th consecutive season in the Czech First League.

Viktoria Plzeň started their European campaign in the second qualifying round beating Drita 2–1 and then minnows Gżira United 6–0, before defeating Tobol 5–1 in play-off round to clinch a berth to the group stage. They topped their group winning all six matches.

== Players ==
=== First-team squad ===
As of 8 February 2024.

Note: Flags indicate national team as defined under FIFA eligibility rules; some limited exceptions apply. Players may hold more than one non-FIFA nationality.

No.	Pos.	Nation	Player
2	DF	CZE	Lukáš Hejda
3	DF	CZE	Robin Hranáč
5	DF	CZE	Jan Paluska
6	MF	CZE	Lukáš Červ
7	MF	CZE	Jan Sýkora
9	FW	CZE	Jan Kliment
10	MF	CZE	Jan Kopic
11	FW	CZE	Matěj Vydra
12	MF	CIV	Ibrahim Traoré
13	GK	SVK	Marián Tvrdoň
14	DF	CZE	Radim Řezník
15	FW	CZE	Tomáš Chorý
16	GK	CZE	Martin Jedlička

No.	Pos.	Nation	Player
17	FW	NGR	Rafiu Durosinmi
18	MF	COL	Jhon Mosquera
19	MF	FRA	Cheick Souaré (on loan from Vyškov)
21	DF	CZE	Václav Jemelka
22	MF	BRA	Cadu
23	MF	CZE	Lukáš Kalvach
24	DF	CZE	Milan Havel
31	MF	CZE	Pavel Šulc
32	MF	CZE	Matěj Valenta
40	DF	LBR	Sampson Dweh (on loan from Vyškov)
44	DF	CZE	Libor Holík
77	MF	SVK	Erik Jirka
—	FW	CZE	Florián Višňa

=== Out on loan ===
Note: Flags indicate national team as defined under FIFA eligibility rules; some limited exceptions apply. Players may hold more than one non-FIFA nationality.

No.	Pos.	Nation	Player
—	DF	BEN	Mohamed Tijani (at Yverdon-Sport)
—	MF	CZE	Roman Květ (at Sivasspor)
—	MF	CZE	Adam Vlkanova (at Ruch Chorzów)
—	DF	CZE	Filip Čihák (at Hradec Králové)
—	DF	CZE	Josef Koželuh (at Zbrojovka Brno)
—	FW	CZE	Adam Kronus (at Zbrojovka Brno)

No.	Pos.	Nation	Player
—	FW	CZE	Lukáš Matějka (at Dukla Prague)
—	MF	CZE	Dominik Kříž (at Varnsdorf)
—	MF	CZE	Alexandr Sojka (at Silon Táborsko)
—	DF	CZE	Václav Míka (at Chrudim)
—	DF	CZE	Ondřej Oravec (at Viktoria Žižkov)
—	FW	CZE	Pavel Hašek (at Příbram)

== Transfers ==
=== In ===
Pos.	Player	Transferred from	Fee	Date	Source
MF	(Ivory Coast) Ibrahim Traoré	(Czech Republic) Slavia Prague	Undisclosed	1 July 2023	
FW	(Nigeria) Rafiu Durosinmi	(Czech Republic) Karvina	Undisclosed	1 July 2023	
DF	(Liberia) Sampson Dweh	(Czech Republic) Vyškov	Loan	19 July 2023	
MF	(France) Cheick Souaré	(Czech Republic) Vyškov	Loan	5 January 2024	
MF	(Czech Republic) Matěj Valenta	(Czech Republic) Slavia Prague	Undisclosed	5 January 2024	
MF	(Czech Republic) Lukáš Červ	(Czech Republic) Slavia Prague	Undisclosed	5 January 2024	

== Pre-season and friendlies ==
Win Draw Loss

21 June 2023 Friendly	Slavoj Koloveč (Czech Republic)	2–14	(Czech Republic) Viktoria Plzeň

24 June 2023 Friendly	Viktoria Plzeň (Czech Republic)	2–0	(Czech Republic) Dukla Prague

28 June 2023 Friendly	Viktoria Plzeň (Czech Republic)	8–2	(Czech Republic) Taborsko

1 July 2023 Friendly	Viktoria Plzeň (Czech Republic)	6–0	(Czech Republic) MFK Chrudim

7 July 2023 Friendly	Viktoria Plzeň (Czech Republic)	3–3	(Germany) Hamburger SV	Westendorf, Austria
18:00 UTC+2				Stadium: Waldstadion Westendorf

10 July 2023 Friendly	Viktoria Plzeň (Czech Republic)	3–0	(Germany) Karlsruher SC	Westendorf, Austria
16:00 CEST (UTC+2)				Stadium: Waldstadion Westendorf

== Competitions ==
=== Overall record ===
Competition	First match	Last match	Starting round	Final position	Record							
Competition	First match	Last match	Starting round	Final position	Pld	W	D	L	GF	GA	GD	Win %
Czech First League	25 August 2023	26 May 2024	Matchday 1	3rd	35	21	7	7	76	40	+36	60.00
Czech Cup	12 October 2023	22 May 2024	Third round	Runners-up	5	4	0	1	20	3	+17	80.00
UEFA Europa Conference League	27 July 2023	18 April 2024	Second qualifying round	Quarter finals	16	11	4	1	22	5	+17	68.75
Total					56	36	11	9	118	48	+70	64.29

Last updated: 24 February 2024
Source: Soccerway

=== Czech First League ===
==== Results summary ====
Overall								Home						Away					
Pld	W	D	L	GF	GA	GD	Pts	W	D	L	GF	GA	GD	W	D	L	GF	GA	GD
35	21	7	7	76	40	+36	70	12	3	3	44	19	+25	9	4	4	32	21	+11

Source: Fortuna Liga

==== Regular season ====
===== League table =====
Pos	Team	Pld	W	D	L	GF	GA	GD	Pts	Qualification or relegation
1	Sparta Prague	30	24	4	2	70	26	+44	76	Qualification for the Championship group
2	Slavia Prague	30	22	6	2	62	23	+39	72	Qualification for the Championship group
3	Viktoria Plzeň	30	19	5	6	67	33	+34	62	Qualification for the Championship group
4	Baník Ostrava	30	13	6	11	48	39	+9	45	Qualification for the Championship group
5	Mladá Boleslav	30	12	8	10	50	46	+4	44	Qualification for the Championship group

Source: Fortuna Liga
Rules for classification: 1) Points; 2) Head-to-head points; 3) Head-to-head goal difference; 4) Head-to-head goals scored; 5) Goal difference; 6) Goals scored; 7) Fair-play ranking; 8) Draw.

===== Results by round =====
Round	1	2	3	4	5	6	7	8	9	10	11	12	13	14	15	16	17	18	19	20	21	22	23	24	25	26	27	28	29	30
Ground	A	H	H	A	H	A	H	A	H	A	H	A	H	A	H	A	A	H	A	H	A	H	A	H	A	H	A	H	A	H
Result	L	D	W	W	W	W	W	W	W	L	W	L	L	W	L	D	W	W	W	D	W	W	W	W	W	L	D	W	D	W
Position	10	10	9	4	3	3	3	3	3	3	3	3	3	3	3	3	3	3	3	3	3	3	3	3	3	3	3	3	3	3

Source: Fortuna Liga
A = Away; H = Home; W = Win; D = Draw; L = Loss

===== Matches =====
The league fixtures were unveiled on 21 June 2023.

22 July 2023 1	Teplice	1–0	Viktoria Plzeň	Teplice
15:00 CEST (UTC+2)	Trubač 28' (pen.)	Report		Stadium: Na Stínadlech; Attendance: 8,141; Referee: Dalibor Černý

30 July 2023 2	Viktoria Plzeň	1–1	Hradec Králové	Plzeň
18:00 CEST (UTC+2)	Hejda 81'	Report	Vašulín (penalty missed) 87'; Šašinka 90+6'	Stadium: Doosan Arena; Attendance: 8,071; Referee: Jan Machálek

6 August 2023 3	Viktoria Plzeň	3–1	Baník Ostrava	Plzeň
15:00 CEST (UTC+2)	Bucha 19'; Chorý 45+1' (pen.); Traoré 77'	Report	Šín 45+4' (pen.)	Stadium: Doosan Arena; Attendance: 10,088; Referee: Dominik Starý

13 August 2023 4	České Budějovice	2–5	Viktoria Plzeň	České Budějovice
18:00 CEST (UTC+2)	Hora 45+3' (pen.); Osmančík 74'	Report	Traoré 8'; Šulc 10', 72', 90+2' (pen.); Bucha 46'	Stadium: Stadion Střelecký ostrov Attendance: 4,723; Referee: Stanislav Volek

20 August 2023 5	Viktoria Plzeň	2–1	Sigma Olomouc	Plzeň
15:00 CEST (UTC+2)	Hejda 45+1'; Bucha 45+3'	Report	Chvátal 27'	Stadium: Doosan Arena; Attendance: 9,114; Referee: Ondřej Berka

3 September 2023 7	Viktoria Plzeň	2–0	Bohemians 1905	Plzeň
15:00 CEST (UTC+2)	Durosinmi 9'; Cadu 45'	Report		Stadium: Doosan Arena; Attendance: 9,156; Referee: Jan Všetečka

17 September 2023 8	Zlín	1–7	Viktoria Plzeň	Zlín
15:00 CEST (UTC+2)	Vukadinovič 24'	Report	Chorý 4'; Šulc 20', 25'; Bucha 45+1'; Durosinmi 49', 57'; Kliment 86'	Stadium: Letná Stadion; Attendance: 3,938; Referee: Petr Hocek

24 September 2023 9	Viktoria Plzeň	6–2	Pardubice	Plzeň
15:00 CEST (UTC+2)	Kalvach 23'; Dweh 27'; Hranáč 45'; Jirka 53' (pen.); Durosinmi 82', 85'	Report	Darmovzal 13'; Daněk 90+1'	Stadium: Doosan Arena; Attendance: 8,809; Referee: Stanislav Volek

30 September 2023 10	Sparta Prague	2–1	Viktoria Plzeň	Prague
18:00 CEST (UTC+2)	Laçi 3'; Kuchta 27'; Preciado (yellow card) 80'; Jensen (after the match) (yellow card)	Report	Dweh (yellow card) 8'; Durosinmi 26'; Cadu (yellow card) 60'; Staněk (after the match) (yellow card)	Stadium: epet ARENA; Attendance: 17,791; Referee: Ondřej Pechanec

8 October 2023 11	Viktoria Plzeň	3–2	Jablonec	Plzeň
18:00 CEST (UTC+2)	Jirka 22' (pen.); Mosquera 38'; Vydra 46'	Report	Krulich 30'; Chramosta 34'	Stadium: Doosan Arena; Attendance: 8,505; Referee: Ondřej Berka

21 October 2023 12	Slovan Liberec	3–0	Viktoria Plzeň	Liberec
15:00 CEST (UTC+2)	Tupta 17'; Kulenovič 67'; Červ 86'	Report		Stadium: Stadion u Nisy; Attendance: 3,127; Referee: Marek Radina

29 October 2023 13	Viktoria Plzeň	0–1	Karviná	Plzeň
15:00 CET (UTC+1)		Report	Čavoš 76'	Stadium: Doosan Arena; Attendance: 8,418; Referee: Dominik Starý

5 November 2023 14	Slavia Prague	1–2	Viktoria Plzeň	Prague
18:00 CET (UTC+1)	van Buren 13'; Bořil (yellow card) 57'; Vlček (yellow card) 87'; Tijani (yellow card) 90+6'	Report	Traoré (yellow card) 51'; Kalvach (yellow card) 51'; Jirka 64', 79', (yellow card) 75'; Kozáčik (not on pitch) (yellow card) 85'; Hranáč (yellow card) 86'; Dweh (yellow card) 90+2'; Sýkora (yellow card) 90+5'	Stadium: Fortuna Arena; Attendance: 18,434; Referee: Dalibor Černý

12 November 2023 15	Viktoria Plzeň	1–4	Slovácko	Plzeň
15:00 CET (UTC+1)	Chorý 17'	Report	Doski 43'; Havlík 63', 72'; Juroška 66'	Stadium: Doosan Arena; Attendance: 8,402; Referee: Ondřej Pechanec

25 November 2023 16	Hradec Králové	1–1	Viktoria Plzeň	Hradec Králové
15:00 CET (UTC+1)	Leibl 11'	Report	Cadu 73'	Stadium: Malšovická aréna Attendance: 7,818; Referee: Ondřej Berka

6 December 2023 6	Mladá Boleslav	1–3	Viktoria Plzeň	Mladá Boleslav
17:00 CET (UTC+1)	Suchomel 45+3'	Report	Šulc 5', 51'; Hranáč 90+5'	Stadium: Lokotrans Aréna; Attendance: 1,121; Referee: Jan Všetečka
Note: The match was originally scheduled for 27 August 2023, but was postponed due to Viktoria Plzeň's participation in European competition.

10 December 2023 18	Viktoria Plzeň	5–0	České Budějovice	Plzeň
15:00 CET (UTC+1)	Jirka 18' (pen.); Kliment 22'; Hranáč 55'; Mosquera 85'; Bucha 90+4'	Report		Stadium: Doosan Arena; Attendance: 5,231; Referee: Jan Petřík

17 December 2023 19	Sigma Olomouc	1–3	Viktoria Plzeň	Olomouc
15:00 CET (UTC+1)	Ventúra 9'	Report	Šulc 10'; Dweh 45'; Vydra 90+5'	Stadium: Andrův stadion Attendance: 3,105; Referee: Vít Zaoral

10 February 2024 20	Viktoria Plzeň	1–1	Mladá Boleslav	Plzeň
18:00 CET (UTC+1)	Chorý 63'	Report	Ladra 87' (pen.)	Stadium: Doosan Arena; Attendance: 9,086; Referee: Dalibor Černý

13 February 2024 17	Baník Ostrava	0–1	Viktoria Plzeň	Ostrava
18:00 CET (UTC+1)		Report	Cadu 90+3'	Stadium: Městský stadion Attendance: 7,717; Referee: Jan Všetečka
Note: The match was originally scheduled for 3 December 2023, but was postponed due to snow.

17 February 2024 21	Bohemians 1905	0–2	Viktoria Plzeň	Prague
18:00 CET (UTC+1)		Report	Chorý 5'; Šulc 12'	Stadium: Ďolíček; Attendance: 6,237; Referee: Karel Rouček

24 February 2024 22	Viktoria Plzeň	3–0	Zlín	Plzeň
18:00 CET (UTC+1)	Mosquera 20'; Šulc 48', 87'	Report		Stadium: Doosan Arena; Attendance: 9,134; Referee: Ondřej Berka

2 March 2024 23	Pardubice	2–3	Viktoria Plzeň	Pardubice
18:00 CET (UTC+1)	Daněk 55'; Kalvach 72' (o.g.)	Report	Kalvach 43'; Šulc 47', 49'	Stadium: CFIG Arena; Attendance: 3,849; Referee: Jan Machálek

10 March 2024 24	Viktoria Plzeň	4–0	Sparta Prague	Plzeň
18:00 CET (UTC+1)	Cadu (yellow card) 25'; Chorý 45', 70'; Souaré 49', (yellow card) 90+2'; Dweh (yellow card) 56'; Šulc 62', (yellow card) 73'	Report	Sadílek (yellow card) 45'; Krejčí (yellow card) 45+3' (yellow-red card) 52'; Mejdr (yellow card) 59'; Kairinen (yellow card) 90'	Stadium: Doosan Arena; Attendance: 11,611; Referee: Dalibor Černý

17 March 2024 25	Jablonec	1–2	Viktoria Plzeň	Jablonec nad Nisou
15:00 CET (UTC+1)	Chramosta 73'	Report	Hejda 20'; Chorý 84'	Stadium: Stadion Střelnice; Attendance: 3,011; Referee: Ondřej Pechanec

30 March 2024 26	Viktoria Plzeň	1–3	Slovan Liberec	Plzeň
15:00 CET (UTC+1)	Metsoko 67'	Report	Chaluš 64'; Kulenovič 69', 79'	Stadium: Doosan Arena; Attendance: 9,718; Referee: Jan Všetečka

6 April 2024 27	Karviná	0–0	Viktoria Plzeň	Karviná
15:00 CEST (UTC+2)		Report		Stadium: Městský stadion Attendance: 3,026; Referee: Adam Trska

14 April 2024 28	Viktoria Plzeň	1–0	Slavia Prague	Plzeň
18:00 CEST (UTC+2)	Kalvach (yellow card) 37'; Šulc 87'; Jedlička (yellow card) 90+5'	Report	Provod (yellow card) 27'; Zafeiris (yellow card) 66'; Chytil (yellow card) 79'	Stadium: Doosan Arena; Attendance: 11,477; Referee: Ondřej Pechanec

21 April 2024 29	Slovácko	1–1	Viktoria Plzeň	Uherské Hradiště
18:00 CEST (UTC+2)	Daníček 73' (pen.)	Report	Metsoko 41'	Stadium: Městský fotbalový stadion Miroslava Valenty; Attendance: 4,631; Referee: Vít Zaoral

27 April 2024 30	Viktoria Plzeň	3–0	Teplice	Plzeň
15:00 CEST (UTC+2)	Chorý 50', 82'; Vydra 68'	Report		Stadium: Doosan Arena; Attendance: 8,632; Referee: Jan Machálek

==== Championship group ====
Pos	Team	Pld	W	D	L	GF	GA	GD	Pts	Qualification or relegation	SPA	SLA	PLZ	OST	MLA	SLO
1	Sparta Prague (C)	35	27	6	2	82	30	+52	87	Qualification for the Champions League second qualifying round	—	0–0	1–1	2–1	—	—
2	Slavia Prague	35	26	7	2	76	24	+52	85	Qualification for the Champions League third qualifying round (Note: Since the Europa League winners, Atalanta qualified for the Champions League via league position, Slavia Prague were promoted from the Champions League second qualifying round to the third qualifying round as one of the two teams with the highest coefficient in the second qualifying round.)	—	—	3–0	5–0	4–0	—
3	Viktoria Plzeň	35	21	7	7	76	40	+36	70	Qualification for the Europa League third qualifying round	—	—	—	1–1	3–0	4–2
4	Baník Ostrava	35	14	7	14	56	48	+8	49	Qualification for the Conference League second qualifying round	—	—	—	—	0–1	6–0
5	Mladá Boleslav (O)	35	13	8	14	51	59	−8	47	Qualification for the Conference League play-off final	0–5	—	—	—	—	0–1
6	Slovácko	35	12	8	15	45	56	−11	44		2–4	1–2	—	—	—	—

Source: Fortuna Liga
Legend: Blue = home team win; Yellow = draw; Red = away team win.
Rules for classification: 1) Total points; 2) Points earned in regular season; 3) Head-to-head points (regular season); 4) Head-to-head goal difference (regular season); 5) Head-to-head goals scored (regular season); 5) Goal difference (all matches); 6) Goals scored (all matches); 7) Fair-play ranking; 8) Draw.
(C) Champions; (O) Play-off winners

===== Results by round =====
Round	1	2	3	4	5
Ground	H	H	A	H	A
Result	W	W	L	D	D
Position	3	3	3	3	3

Source: Fortuna Liga
A = Away; H = Home; W = Win; D = Draw; L = Loss

===== Matches =====
5 May 2024 31	Viktoria Plzeň	3–0	Mladá Boleslav	Plzeň
15:00 CEST (UTC+2)	Cadu 10'; Souaré 12'; Chorý 62'	Report		Stadium: Doosan Arena; Attendance: 8,103; Referee: Jan Petřík

11 May 2024 32	Viktoria Plzeň	4–2	Slovácko	Plzeň
15:00 CEST (UTC+2)	Šulc 16', 90+3' (pen.), 90+8'; Hejda 43'	Report		Stadium: Doosan Arena; Attendance: 6,740; Referee: Jan Všetečka

15 May 2024 33	Slavia Prague	3–0	Viktoria Plzeň	Prague
19:30 CEST (UTC+2)	Zmrzlý 5'; Dorley 10'; Jurečka 90+8'	Report	Hejda (yellow card) 22'; Havel (yellow card) 73'	Stadium: Fortuna Arena; Attendance: 17,895; Referee: Karel Rouček

18 May 2024 34	Viktoria Plzeň	1–1	Baník Ostrava	Plzeň
17:00 CEST (UTC+2)	Vydra 49'	Report	Buchta 67'	Stadium: Doosan Arena; Attendance: 7,714; Referee: Marek Radina

26 May 2024 35	Sparta Prague	1–1	Viktoria Plzeň	Prague
16:00 CEST (UTC+2)	Zelený 45+1'; Preciado (yellow card) 81'	Report	Hejda (yellow card) 51'; Chorý 70'	Stadium: epet ARENA; Attendance: 17,138; Referee: Jan Všetečka

=== Czech Cup ===
12 October 2023 Third round	Viktoria Mariánské Lázně	0–10	Viktoria Plzeň	Mariánské Lázně
16:00 CEST (UTC+2)	M. Drahorád (yellow card) 61'	Report	Sýkora 10' (pen.); Vydra 31', 56', 63'; Traoré 35', 70', 74'; Vlkanova 66'; Kopic 81', 89'	Stadium: Stadion FC Viktoria; Referee: Tomáš Ulrich

16 November 2023 Fourth round	Sigma Olomouc	1–3	Viktoria Plzeň	Olomouc
15:00 CET (UTC+1)	Breite 7'	Report	Cadu 17'; Šulc 19', 72'	Stadium: Andrův stadion Referee: Dalibor Černý

2 April 2024 Quarter-finals	Jablonec	0–3	Viktoria Plzeň	Jablonec nad Nisou
18:00 CEST (UTC+2)		Report	Tekijaški 34' (o.g.); Kopic 36'; Souaré 65'	Stadium: Stadion Střelnice; Referee: Marek Radina
Note: The match was originally scheduled for 28 February 2024, but was postponed due to thick fog.

24 April 2024 Semi-finals	Viktoria Plzeň	v	Zlín	Plzeň
18:00 CEST (UTC+2)		Report		Stadium: Doosan Arena

=== UEFA Europa Conference League ===
==== Second qualifying round ====
27 July 2023 First leg	Viktoria Plzeň (Czech Republic)	0–0	(Kosovo) Drita	Plzeň, Czech Republic
19:00		Report		Stadium: Doosan Arena; Attendance: 10,334; Referee: Henrik Nalbandyan (Armenia)

3 August 2023 Second leg	Drita (Kosovo)	1–2 (1–2 agg.)	(Czech Republic) Viktoria Plzeň	Pristina, Kosovo
20:00	Bl. Krasniqi 90+2'	Report	Durosinmi 76'; Jirka 90+21' (pen.)	Stadium: Fadil Vokrri Stadium; Attendance: 8,000; Referee: Jakob Alexander Sundberg (Denmark)
Note: Drita played their home match at the Fadil Vokrri Stadium in Pristina, instead of their regular stadium, the Gjilan City Stadium in Gjilan, which did not meet UEFA requirements.

==== Third qualifying round ====
10 August 2023 First leg	Viktoria Plzeň (Czech Republic)	4–0	(Malta) Gżira United	Plzeň, Czech Republic
19:00	Bucha 10'; Durosinmi 23'; Šulc 73'; Kopic 90+4'	Report		Stadium: Doosan Arena; Attendance: 10,142; Referee: Vilhjálmur Þórarinsson (Iceland)

17 August 2023 Second leg	Gżira United (Malta)	0–2 (0–6 agg.)	(Czech Republic) Viktoria Plzeň	Ta' Qali, Malta
19:00		Report	Traoré 47'; Vlkanova 70'	Stadium: National Stadium; Attendance: 365; Referee: Denys Shurman (Ukraine)

==== Play-off round ====
24 August 2023 First leg	Tobol (Kazakhstan)	1–2	(Czech Republic) Viktoria Plzeň	Kostanay, Kazakhstan
16:00 (20:00 ALMT)	Déblé 90+8' (pen.)	Report	Cadu 73'; Kalvach 90'	Stadium: Central Stadium; Attendance: 8,420; Referee: Marian Alexandru Barbu (Romania)

31 August 2023 Second leg	Viktoria Plzeň (Czech Republic)	3–0 (5–1 agg.)	(Kazakhstan) Tobol	Plzeň, Czech Republic
19:00	Chorý 32'; Durosinmi 59'; Traoré 90+3'	Report		Stadium: Doosan Arena; Attendance: 11,069; Referee: Matej Jug (Slovenia)

==== Group stage ====
The draw for the group stage was held on 1 September 2023.

Pos	Team	Pld	W	D	L	GF	GA	GD	Pts	Qualification	PLZ	DZG	AST	BAL
1	(Czech Republic) Viktoria Plzeň	6	6	0	0	9	1	+8	18	Advance to round of 16	—	1–0	3–0	1–0
2	(Croatia) Dinamo Zagreb	6	3	0	3	10	5	+5	9	Advance to knockout round play-offs	0–1	—	5–1	3–0
3	(Kazakhstan) Astana	6	1	1	4	4	13	−9	4 (Note: Ranked on head-to-head points: Astana 4, Ballkani 1.)		1–2	0–2	—	0–0
4	(Kosovo) Ballkani	6	1	1	4	3	7	−4	4		0–1	2–0	1–2	—

Source: UEFA
Rules for classification: Group stage tiebreakers
Notes:

21 September 2023 1	Viktoria Plzeň (Czech Republic)	1–0	(Kosovo) Ballkani	Plzeň, Czech Republic
21:00	Kalvach 73'	Report		Stadium: Doosan Arena; Attendance: 9,562; Referee: Damian Sylwestrzak (Poland)

5 October 2023 2	Astana (Kazakhstan)	1–2	(Czech Republic) Viktoria Plzeň	Astana, Kazakhstan
16:30 (20:30 ALMT)	Tomasov 51'	Report	Chorý 54'; Kopic 57'	Stadium: Astana Arena; Attendance: 24,421; Referee: Gustavo Correia (Portugal)

26 October 2023 3	Dinamo Zagreb (Croatia)	0–1	(Czech Republic) Viktoria Plzeň	Zagreb, Croatia
21:00		Report	Chorý 69' (pen.)	Stadium: Stadion Maksimir; Attendance: 8,407; Referee: Robert Jones (England)

9 November 2023 4	Viktoria Plzeň (Czech Republic)	1–0	(Croatia) Dinamo Zagreb	Plzeň, Czech Republic
18:45	Chorý 35' (pen.)	Report		Stadium: Doosan Arena; Attendance: 11,084; Referee: Anastasios Sidiropoulos (Greece)

30 November 2023 5	Ballkani (Kosovo)	0–1	(Czech Republic) Viktoria Plzeň	Tirana, Albania
18:45		Report	Šulc 81'	Stadium: Arena Kombëtare; Attendance: 2,200; Referee: Marian Barbu (Romania)
Note: Ballkani played their last home match at the Arena Kombëtare, in Tirana, instead of their pre-selected stadium, the Fadil Vokrri Stadium, in Pristina, due to deteriorated pitch conditions following recent matches.

14 December 2023 6	Viktoria Plzeň (Czech Republic)	3–0	(Kazakhstan) Astana	Plzeň, Czech Republic
21:00	Vlkanova 58'; Mosquera 67', 82'	Report		Stadium: Doosan Arena; Attendance: 8,135; Referee: Willy Delajod (France)

==== Knockout phase ====
===== Round of 16 =====
7 March 2024 First leg	Servette (Switzerland)	0–0	(Czech Republic) Viktoria Plzeň	Lancy, Switzerland
21:00 CET (UTC+1)	Tsunemoto (yellow card) 41'; Guillemenot (yellow card) 44'; Bolla (yellow card) 48'	Report	Cadu (yellow card) 35'; Kopic (yellow card) 78'	Stadium: Stade de Genève; Attendance: 15,354; Referee: Morten Krogh (Denmark)

14 March 2024 Second leg	Viktoria Plzeň (Czech Republic)	0–0 (a.e.t.) (0–0 agg.) (3–1 p)	(Switzerland) Servette	Plzeň, Czech Republic
18:45 CET (UTC+1)	Kopic (yellow card) 35'; Červ (yellow card) 82'; Václav Jemelka (yellow card) 105'; Dweh (yellow card) 108'	Report	Crivelli (yellow card) 45'; Mazikou (yellow card) 68'; Rouiller (yellow card) 94'; Diba (yellow card) 114'; Baron (yellow card) 120'	Stadium: Doosan Arena; Attendance: 11,225; Referee: William Collum (Scotland)
	Penalties
	Chorý (penalty scored); Mosquera (penalty scored); Šulc (penalty scored)		Stevanović (penalty missed); Guillemenot (penalty scored); Severin (penalty missed); Tsunemoto (penalty missed)

=== Quarter finals ===
11 April 2024 First leg	Viktoria Plzeň (Czech Republic)	0–0	(Italy) Fiorentina	Plzeň, Czech Republic
18:45 CET (UTC+1)	Cadu (yellow card) 16'; Řezník (yellow card) 72'; Chorý (yellow card) 90+3'	Report	Ikoné (yellow card) 89'	Stadium: Doosan Arena; Referee: Orel Grinfeld (Israel)

18 April 2024 Second leg	Fiorentina (Italy)	2–0 (a.e.t.) (2–0 agg.)	(Czech Republic) Viktoria Plzeň	Florence, Italy
18:45 CET (UTC+1)	Ranieri (yellow card) 36'; González 92', (yellow card) 93'; Biraghi 108'	Report	Chorý (yellow card) 37'; Cadu (red card) 67'; Řezník (yellow card) 74'	Stadium: Stadio Artemio Franchi; Referee: Jesús Gil Manzano (Spain)
