= Florian Wiegele =

Austrian footballer (born 2001)

Personal information
- Date of birth: 21 March 2001 (age 25)
- Place of birth: Graz, Styria, Austria
- Height: 2.05 m (6 ft 9 in)
- Position: Goalkeeper

Team information
- Current team: Viktoria Plzeň
- Number: 44

Youth career
- –2007: SV Strassgang
- 2007–2019: SK Sturm Graz

Senior career*
Years	Team	Apps	(Gls)
2017–2019	Sturm Graz II	0	(0)
2019–2022	SV Lebring	47	(0)
2022–2023	FC Gleisdorf 09	24	(0)
2023–2024	DSV Leoben	12	(0)
2024–	Viktoria Plzeň	20	(0)
2025	→ Grazer AK (loan)	15	(0)

International career^{‡}
2026–	Austria	2	(0)
- * Club domestic league appearances and goals as of 27 May 2026 ‡ National team caps and goals as of 1 October 2026

Florian Wiegele (born 21 March 2001) is an Austrian professional footballer who plays as a goalkeeper for Czech First League club Viktoria Plzeň and the Austria national team.

== Early life ==
Wiegele was born on 21 March 2001 in Austria and is a native of Graz, Austria. Growing up, he regarded Germany international Manuel Neuer as his football idol and has been nicknamed "Langer".

== Career ==
Wiegele started his career with the reserve team of Austrian side SK Sturm Graz in 2017. Two years later, he signed for Austrian side SV Lebring. In 2022, he signed for Austrian side FC Gleisdorf 09, where he made twenty-four league appearances and scored zero goals. During the summer of 2023, he signed for Austrian side DSV Leoben, where he made twelve league appearances and suffered relegation from the second tier to the third tier.

Ahead of the 2024–25 season, he signed for Czech side Viktoria Plzeň. Six months later, he was sent on loan to Austrian side Grazer AK. German magazine Kicker wrote in 2025 that he "immediately established himself as the number one goalie for GAK, pushing promotion hero Jakob Meierhofer to the bench".

Wiegele was named in the Austria squad for the 2026 Men's World Cup and at 2.05m, became the tallest player to ever make a World Cup squad.

== Career statistics ==
=== Club ===
As of match played 15 March 2026

Appearances and goals by club, season and competition
Club	Season	League			National cup		Europe		Other		Total	
Club	Season	Division	Apps	Goals	Apps	Goals	Apps	Goals	Apps	Goals	Apps	Goals
Sturm Graz II	2018–19	Austrian Regionalliga Central	0	0	—		—		—		0	0
SV Lebring	2019–20	Landesliga Steiermark	14	0	—		—		—		14	0
SV Lebring	2020–21	Landesliga Steiermark	5	0	—		—		—		5	0
SV Lebring	2021–22	Landesliga Steiermark	28	0	—		—		—		28	0
SV Lebring	Total		47	0	—		—		—		47	0
FC Gleisdorf 09	2022–23	Austrian Regionalliga Central	24	0	—		—		—		24	0
DSV Leoben	2023–24	2. Liga	12	0	4	0	—		—		16	0
Viktoria Plzeň	2024–25	Czech First League	0	0	0	0	0	0	—		0	0
Viktoria Plzeň	2025–26	Czech First League	12	0	3	0	8 (Note: Two appearances in UEFA Champions League, six appearances in UEFA Europa League)	0	—		23	0
Viktoria Plzeň	Total		12	0	3	0	8	0	—		23	0
Grazer AK (loan)	2024–25	Austrian Bundesliga	15	0	—		—		—		15	0
Career total			110	0	7	0	8	0	0	0	125	0

=== International ===
As of match played 1 October 2026

Appearances and goals by national team and year
National team	Year	Apps	Goals
Austria	2026	2	0
Total		2	0
