= Matěj Vydra =

Czech footballer (born 1992)

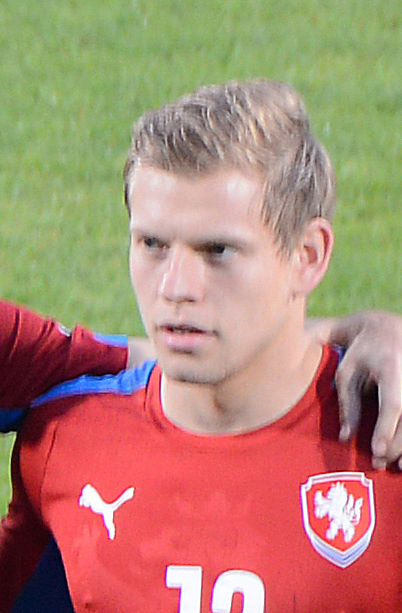
- Vydra lining up with the Czech Republic in 2014

Personal information
- Full name: Matěj Vydra
- Date of birth: 1 May 1992 (age 34)
- Place of birth: Chotěboř, Czechoslovakia
- Height: 1.80 m (5 ft 11 in)
- Position: Forward

Team information
- Current team: Viktoria Plzeň
- Number: 11

Youth career
- 1997–2003: FC Chotěboř
- 2003–2008: Vysočina Jihlava

Senior career*
Years	Team	Apps	(Gls)
2008–2010	Vysočina Jihlava	27	(5)
2010	Baník Ostrava	14	(4)
2010–2015	Udinese	2	(0)
2011–2012	→ Club Brugge (loan)	1	(0)
2012–2013	→ Watford (loan)	41	(20)
2013–2014	→ West Bromwich Albion (loan)	23	(3)
2014–2015	→ Watford (loan)	42	(16)
2015–2016	Watford	1	(0)
2015–2016	→ Reading (loan)	36	(9)
2016–2018	Derby County	73	(26)
2018–2022	Burnley	82	(8)
2022–	Viktoria Plzeň	98	(24)

International career^{‡}
2007–2008	Czech Republic U16	8	(2)
2008–2009	Czech Republic U17	18	(6)
2009	Czech Republic U18	2	(1)
2010–2011	Czech Republic U19	8	(1)
2011–2015	Czech Republic U21	4	(0)
2012–	Czech Republic	48	(7)
- * Club domestic league appearances and goals as of 27 May 2026 (UTC) ‡ National team caps and goals as of 18:22, 12 October 2025 (UTC)

Matěj Vydra (Czech pronunciation: [ˈmacɛj ˈvɪdra], born 1 May 1992) is a Czech professional footballer who plays as a forward for Czech First League club Viktoria Plzeň and the Czech Republic national team.

At club level, Vydra previously played for Vysočina Jihlava, Baník Ostrava, Udinese and Club Brugge. He played club football in England for Watford, West Bromwich Albion, Reading, Derby County and Burnley.

== Club career ==
Vydra joined Baník Ostrava from Vysočina Jihlava in January 2010 at the age of 17 for 20 million CZK (€765,000). He spent six months at Baník Ostrava, where he scored four goals in 14 matches.

=== Udinese ===
In June 2010, Vydra moved to Serie A side Udinese and was also voted by sports journalists the Czech Revelation of the Year for his performances at Baník Ostrava in the 2009–10 season. He joined Club Brugge on loan in August 2011 but returned to Udinese having played just two games due to an injury.

==== Watford (loan) ====
In July 2012, it was confirmed he had been loaned to Watford for the 2012–13 season. Vydra scored his first goal for Watford when he netted the winner against Crystal Palace on 18 August 2012, in a game which finished 3–2.

He scored a goal against Leeds United on 10 November. Vydra then scored goals in successive matches in a 2–0 win against Nottingham Forest on 22 December 2012 and in a 3–1 away win over Brighton & Hove Albion on 29 December 2012. He scored another brace on 12 January 2013 against Middlesbrough. Vydra carried on his rich vein of form by netting another goal the week after, on 19 January 2013 against Huddersfield and then netted his third goal in as many games a week later, scoring twice on 26 January 2013 in a 3–0 win away to Nottingham Forest. He was in fine form, and netted another goal in his next start against Bolton on 2 February 2013. The match eventually finished 2–1 to Watford, with Vydra assisting Almen Abdi's winning goal. After three matches without a goal, Vydra netted his 20th goal of the campaign in a 2–1 win over Derby County on 23 February 2013.

On 25 March 2013 it was announced that he had won the 2012–13 Championship Player of the Season award in his first season in English football. Vydra won the award ahead of Glenn Murray of Crystal Palace and Blackpool's Thomas Ince. Despite going on a run in which he didn't score in 13 games, he went on to score twice in the semi-final of the end-of-season play-offs in a 3–2 aggregate win over Leicester. Vydra's season at Watford finished in disappointment as his club lost the chance to be promoted to the English top-flight after losing the play-off final against Crystal Palace and he injured his ankle during the match, having to be substituted at half time.

==== West Bromwich Albion (loan) ====
Vydra joined Premier League club West Bromwich Albion on a season-long loan deal on 13 August 2013. He scored his first goal for the club on 21 December 2013, equalising for West Brom in a 1–1 Premier League draw against Hull City. On 22 February 2014, Vydra scored his second goal for West Brom, equalising in a 1–1 draw against Fulham. His third goal for the club came in a 3–3 draw against Tottenham, with Vydra scoring the game's first goal after 28 seconds.

==== Return to Watford ====
On 26 June 2014, Watford announced they had re-signed Vydra on a season-long loan from Udinese, with a view to a permanent move. Vydra made a scoring return as he netted in Watford's 3–0 opening day win over Bolton Wanderers on 9 August 2014. On 25 April, he came on as a substitute to score as Watford beat Brighton & Hove Albion 2–0 at the Falmer Stadium thus securing Watford's promotion back to the Premier League, thanks to other results going their way, with Vydra scoring 16 goals in the Championship to help earn promotion.

=== Watford ===
Watford signed Vydra permanently in July 2015 with the player signing a five-year contract. He started the 2015–16 season behind Odion Ighalo and Troy Deeney in the pecking order, on 25 August 2015, he played for Watford in a 1–0 loss against Preston in the League Cup.

==== Reading (loan) ====
On 1 September 2015, Reading signed Vydra on a season-long loan for a fee of £2.5 million with an option to sign him permanently for £10 million if promoted to the Premier League in the 2016–17 season. He made his Reading debut on 11 September 2015 in a 5–1 win against Ipswich Town. He scored his first goal for the club on 31 October in a 1–1 draw against Brighton.

On 19 January 2016 in a FA Cup third round replay, he scored a hat-trick in a 5–2 comeback victory over Huddersfield Town. In total he scored 9 goals in 36 appearances in all competitions for the club, finishing the club's 2nd top scorer (behind Nick Blackman) for the 2015–16 season.

=== Derby County ===
On 27 August 2016, Derby County announced that they had signed Watford striker Vydra on a four-year deal, for a fee reported at £8,000,000. He scored his first goal for the club in a 2–1 loss to Blackburn Rovers on 24 September 2016. In his first Derby season he scored 5 goals, making 33 appearances in the EFL Championship with 13 of those coming as a substitute, with Vydra playing in different positions with the likes of Tom Ince, Darren Bent, Johnny Russell and David Nugent all competing for attacking position roles.

Vydra scored his first hat-trick for the club in a 3–0 away win over Middlesbrough on 25 November 2017. After the sale of previous season top scorer Tom Ince and the acquisitions of Strikers Sam Winnall and Cameron Jerome, Vydra found himself playing in his favoured second striker position behind a central striker of either Winnall, Jerome, David Nugent or Chris Martin His goals during the 2017–18 season helped Derby reach the play-off semi finals, where they were knocked out over two legs by Fulham.

In April 2018, he was named in the PFA Championship Team of the Year and also in the EFL Championship Team Of The Year. He scored 22 goals in all competitions and received the Sky Bet Championship Golden Boot after scoring 21 goals in the Championship during the 2017–18 season. On 1 May, Vydra won 3 awards at the club's end of season awards ceremony winning the Player of the Year, Players' Player of the Year and the Jack Stamps Player of the Year awards.

In July 2018, Vydra held talks with fellow EFL Championship side Leeds United over a potential move. However, after weeks of negotiations, the move broke down over personal terms.

=== Burnley ===
Burnley signed Vydra for an undisclosed fee on a three-year deal from Derby on 7 August 2018. On 30 August 2018, he scored on his debut in a 1–1 draw against Olympiakos in the play-off round of the Europa League. on 22 September, he scored his first goal in the Premier League in a 4–0 victory over AFC Bournemouth.

On 15 February 2020, Vydra netted his first league goal since September 2018 in a 2–1 win against Southampton, that goal was later voted as Premier League Goal of the Month for February.

After Burnley's relegation, on 4 August 2022, Vydra confirmed his departure at the end of his contract; despite offers from the club to extend.

=== Viktoria Plzeň ===
On 23 December 2022, Vydra returned to Czechia joining Viktoria Plzeň on a free transfer and signing a two-and-a-half year contract.

== International career ==
Having represented several Czech youth teams ranging from under-16 to under-21, Vydra received his first call-up to the senior squad for a 2014 FIFA World Cup qualification match away against Denmark and a friendly match against Finland. He debuted in a goalless draw of the former match in September 2012, playing the first 73 minutes. On 26 March 2013, Vydra scored his first two goals in a World Cup qualification against Armenia.

== Career statistics ==
=== Club ===
As of match played 30 August 2025

Appearances and goals by club, season and competition
Club	Season	League			National cup (Note: Includes Czech Cup, Belgian Cup, Coppa Italia, FA Cup)		League cup (Note: Includes EFL Cup)		Europe		Other		Total	
Club	Season	Division	Apps	Goals	Apps	Goals	Apps	Goals	Apps	Goals	Apps	Goals	Apps	Goals
Vysočina Jihlava	2008–09	Czech 2. Liga	12	2	0	0	—		—		—		12	2
Vysočina Jihlava	2009–10	Czech 2. Liga	15	3	2	1	—		—		—		17	4
Vysočina Jihlava	Total		27	5	2	1	—		—		—		29	6
Baník Ostrava	2009–10	Czech First League	14	4	—		—		—		—		14	4
Udinese	2010–11	Serie A	2	0	1	0	—		—		—		3	0
Udinese	2011–12	Serie A	0	0	0	0	—		—		—		0	0
Udinese	2013–14	Serie A	0	0	0	0	—		1 (Note: Appearance(s) in UEFA Europa League)	1	—		1	1
Udinese	Total		2	0	1	0	—		1	1	—		4	1
Club Brugge (loan)	2011–12	Belgian Pro League	1	0	1	0	—		—		—		2	0
Watford (loan)	2012–13	Championship	41	20	1	0	2	0	—		3 (Note: Appearances in Championship play-offs)	2	47	22
West Bromwich Albion (loan)	2013–14	Premier League	23	3	1	0	1	0	—		—		25	3
Watford (loan)	2014–15	Championship	42	16	1	0	2	0	—		—		45	16
Watford	2015–16	Premier League	0	0	—		1	0	—		—		1	0
Watford	2016–17	Premier League	1	0	—		1	0	—		—		2	0
Watford	Total		43	16	1	0	4	0	—		—		48	16
Reading (loan)	2015–16	Championship	31	3	5	6	—		—		—		36	9
Derby County	2016–17	Championship	33	5	3	0	0	0	—		—		36	5
Derby County	2017–18	Championship	40	21	1	0	1	1	—		2	0	44	22
Derby County	Total		73	26	4	0	1	1	—		2	0	80	27
Burnley	2018–19	Premier League	13	1	2	0	1	0	1	1	—		17	2
Burnley	2019–20	Premier League	19	2	2	0	1	0	—		—		22	2
Burnley	2020–21	Premier League	28	3	3	1	3	2	—		—		34	6
Burnley	2021–22	Premier League	22	2	0	0	2	0	—		—		24	2
Burnley	Total		82	8	7	1	7	2	1	1	—		97	12
Viktoria Plzeň	2022–23	Czech First League	16	4	0	0	—		—		—		16	4
Viktoria Plzeň	2023–24	Czech First League	28	4	4	3	—		11 (Note: Three appearances in UEFA Europa League, eight appearances in UEFA Europa Conference League)	0	—		43	7
Viktoria Plzeň	2024–25	Czech First League	32	10	3	1	—		15	3	—		50	14
Viktoria Plzeň	2025–26	Czech First League	6	5	0	0	—		4 (Note: Appearances in UEFA Champions League)	1	—		10	6
Viktoria Plzeň	Total		82	23	7	4	—		30	4	—		119	31
Career total			420	108	30	12	15	3	32	6	7	4	496	133

=== International ===
As of match played 12 October 2025

Appearances and goals by national team and year
National team	Year	Apps	Goals
Czech Republic	2012	4	0
Czech Republic	2013	5	2
Czech Republic	2014	6	2
Czech Republic	2016	5	1
Czech Republic	2018	4	0
Czech Republic	2019	2	0
Czech Republic	2020	6	1
Czech Republic	2021	14	1
Czech Republic	2025	2	0
Total		48	7

As of match played 8 September 2021. Czech Republic score listed first, score column indicates score after each Vydra goal.

International goals by date, venue, cap, opponent, score, result and competition
No.	Date	Venue	Cap	Opponent	Score	Result	Competition
1	26 March 2013	Republican Stadium, Yerevan, Armenia	7	Armenia	1–0	3–0	2014 FIFA World Cup qualification
2	26 March 2013	Republican Stadium, Yerevan, Armenia	7	Armenia	2–0	3–0	2014 FIFA World Cup qualification
3	5 March 2014	Eden Arena, Prague, Czech Republic	10	Norway	2–1	2–2	Friendly
4	21 May 2014	Olympic Stadium, Helsinki, Finland	11	Finland	1–1	2–2	Friendly
5	29 March 2016	Friends Arena, Stockholm, Sweden	17	Sweden	1–1	1–1	Friendly
6	11 October 2020	Sammy Ofer Stadium, Haifa, Israel	28	Israel	2–0	2–1	2020–21 UEFA Nations League B
7	8 September 2021	Doosan Arena, Plzeň, Czech Republic	42	Ukraine	1–1	1–1	Friendly

== Honours ==
Watford

- Football League Championship runner-up: 2014–15

Individual

- PFA Team of the Year: 2012–13 Championship, 2017–18 Championship
- Football League Championship Player of the Year: 2013
- Football League Championship: Golden Boot 2017–18
- Football League Championship Team of the Year 2017–18
- Derby County Player of the Year 2017–18
- Derby County Players' Player of the Year 2017–18
- Premier League Goal of the Month: February 2020
