= Rafiu Durosinmi =

Nigerian footballer (born 2003)

Personal information
- Full name: Rafiu Adekunle Durosinmi
- Date of birth: 1 January 2003 (age 23)
- Place of birth: Lagos, Nigeria
- Height: 1.92 m (6 ft 4 in)
- Position: Forward

Team information
- Current team: Genk
- Number: 17

Youth career
- –2021: Box2Box FC
- 2021–2022: Karviná

Senior career*
Years	Team	Apps	(Gls)
2022–2023	Karviná	34	(6)
2023	→ Viktoria Plzeň (loan)	15	(4)
2023–2026	Viktoria Plzeň	45	(19)
2026	Pisa	12	(1)
2026–	Genk	9	(6)

International career^{‡}
2026–	Nigeria	3	(0)
- * Club domestic league appearances and goals as of 25 October 2026 ‡ National team caps and goals as of 3 June 2026

Rafiu Adekunle Durosinmi (born 1 January 2003) is a Nigerian professional footballer who plays as a forward for Belgian Pro League club Genk and the Nigeria national team.

== Early life ==
Durosinmi was born in Lagos, Nigeria.

== Club career ==
=== Karviná ===
Before joining Karviná, Durosinmi played youth football in Nigeria. In 2022, he was promoted to the first team. During his first season, he scored three goals, including one against Slavia Prague. In January 2023, Durosinmi was loaned to Viktoria Plzeň for six months with an option to buy. After arriving on loan, he played a friendly for Viktoria Plzeň.

=== Viktoria Plzeň ===
In June 2023 Viktoria exercised their option to transfer Durosinmi and he signed a contract until 2026.

=== Pisa ===
On 14 January 2026, Durosinmi signed a contract with Serie A club Pisa.

=== Genk ===
On 23 July 2026, Durosinmi joined Belgian Pro League side Genk on a four-year contract for a reported fee of €10.5 million, making him Genk's most expensive signing.

== International career ==
In May 2026, Durosinmi received his first invitation to the Nigeria national team in the Unity Cup held in London.

== Style of play ==
Durosinmi is known for his height and technical ability.

== Career statistics ==
=== Club ===
As of match played 25 October 2026

Appearances and goals by club, season and competition
Club	Season	League			National cup (Note: Includes Czech Cup, Belgian Cup)		Continental		Other		Total	
Club	Season	League	Apps	Goals	Apps	Goals	Apps	Goals	Apps	Goals	Apps	Goals
Karviná	2021–22	Czech First League	19	3	1	0	—		—		20	3
Karviná	2022–23	Fortuna národní liga	15	3	4	4	—		—		19	7
Karviná	Total		34	6	5	4	—		—		39	10
Viktoria Plzeň (loan)	2022–23	Czech First League	15	4	—		—		—		15	4
Viktoria Plzeň	2023–24	Czech First League	11	6	0	0	8 (Note: Appearances in UEFA Conference League)	3	—		19	9
Viktoria Plzeň	2024–25	Czech First League	16	6	2	1	4 (Note: Appearances in UEFA Europa League)	2	—		22	9
Viktoria Plzeň	2025–26	Czech First League	18	7	2	2	10 (Note: Four appearances and two goals in UEFA Champions League, six appearances and two goals in UEFA Europa League)	4	—		30	13
Viktoria Plzeň	Total		45	19	4	3	22	9	0	0	71	31
Pisa	2025–26	Serie A	12	1	—		—		—		12	1
Genk	2026–27	Belgian Pro League	9	6	1	1	—		—		10	7
Career total			115	36	10	8	22	9	0	0	147	53

=== International ===
As of match played 3 June 2026

Appearances and goals by national team and year
National team	Year	Apps	Goals
Nigeria	2026	3	0
Total		3	0
