= Lukáš Červ =

Czech footballer (born 2001)

Personal information
- Date of birth: 10 April 2001 (age 25)
- Place of birth: Prague, Czech Republic
- Height: 1.82 m (6 ft 0 in)
- Position: Central midfielder

Team information
- Current team: Viktoria Plzeň
- Number: 6

Youth career
- Slavia Prague

Senior career*
| Years | Team | Apps | (Gls) |
| 2019–2022 | Slavia Prague | 1 | (0) |
| 2020–2021 | → Vysočina Jihlava (loan) | 24 | (7) |
| 2021–2022 | → Pardubice (loan) | 22 | (2) |
| 2022–2024 | Slovan Liberec | 49 | (7) |
| 2024– | Viktoria Plzeň | 87 | (4) |

International career^{‡}
| 2018–2019 | Czech Republic U18 | 14 | (0) |
| 2019–2020 | Czech Republic U19 | 9 | (1) |
| 2021–2023 | Czech Republic U21 | 13 | (0) |
| 2024– | Czech Republic | 24 | (2) |
- * Club domestic league appearances and goals as of 6 September 2026 ‡ National team caps and goals as of 15 November 2026

Lukáš Červ (born 10 April 2001) is a Czech professional footballer who plays as a central midfielder for Viktoria Plzeň and the Czech Republic national team.

== Club career ==
Červ played for the youth team of SK Slavia Prague, with which he also played in the 2019–20 UEFA Youth League. He made his senior league debut for Slavia Prague on 5 July 2020 in their Czech First League 3–1 away win against Slovan Liberec. He then spent the 2020–21 season on loan at Vysočina Jihlava playing the Czech National Football League, where he made 24 appearances and scored 7 goals. He spent the following season (2021–22) on loan in Pardubice.

Before the 2022–23 season, he transferred to Slovan Liberec, where he became one of the busiest players.

On 5 January 2024, Červ signed a contract with Viktoria Plzeň until 2027.

== International career ==
Červ played regularly for the Czech U18, U19 and U21 youth teams. His 13 appearances for the U21 team includes two matches at the 2023 UEFA European Under-21 Championship, where he was part of the starting line-up in both.

Červ received his first call-up to the senior national team ahead of the UEFA Euro 2024. He debuted on 7 June 2024 in a 7–1 friendly victory against Malta in Grödig, Austria, coming as a substitute to Mojmír Chytil in the 79th minute.

On 31 May 2026, Červ was selected in the 26-man squad for the 2026 FIFA World Cup.

== Family ==
Červ's cousins are Martin and David Douděra, both professional football players.

== Career statistics ==
=== Club ===
As of 13 May 2026

| Club | Season | League | | | Cup | | Continental | | Other | | Total | |
| Club | Season | Division | Apps | Goals | Apps | Goals | Apps | Goals | Apps | Goals | Apps | Goals |
|---|---|---|---|---|---|---|---|---|---|---|---|---|
| Slavia Prague | 2019–20 | Czech First League | 1 | 0 | — | | — | | — | | 1 | 0 |
| Vysočina Jihlava (loan) | 2020–21 | Czech National Football League | 24 | 7 | 3 | 1 | — | | — | | 27 | 8 |
| Pardubice (loan) | 2021–22 | Czech First League | 22 | 2 | 2 | 0 | — | | — | | 24 | 2 |
| Slovan Liberec | 2022–23 | Czech First League | 32 | 4 | 3 | 0 | — | | — | | 35 | 4 |
| Slovan Liberec | 2023–24 | Czech First League | 17 | 3 | 2 | 0 | — | | — | | 19 | 3 |
| Slovan Liberec | Total | | 49 | 7 | 5 | 0 | — | | — | | 54 | 7 |
| Viktoria Plzeň | 2023–24 | Czech First League | 16 | 0 | 3 | 1 | 4 (Note: Appearances in UEFA Conference League) | 0 | — | | 23 | 1 |
| Viktoria Plzeň | 2024–25 | Czech First League | 33 | 2 | 3 | 0 | 16 (Note: Appearances in UEFA Europa League) | 2 | — | | 52 | 4 |
| Viktoria Plzeň | 2025–26 | Czech First League | 32 | 1 | 3 | 1 | 14 (Note: Four appearances in UEFA Champions League, ten appearances and one goal in UEFA Europa League) | 1 | — | | 49 | 3 |
| Viktoria Plzeň | Total | | 81 | 3 | 9 | 2 | 34 | 3 | — | | 124 | 8 |
| Career total | | | 177 | 9 | 19 | 3 | 34 | 3 | 0 | 0 | 230 | 25 |

=== International ===
As of match played 15 November 2026

Appearances and goals by national team and year
| National team | Year | Apps | Goals |
|---|---|---|---|
| Czech Republic | 2024 | 6 | 1 |
| Czech Republic | 2025 | 8 | 1 |
| Czech Republic | 2026 | 10 | 0 |
| Total | | 24 | 2 |

Scores and results list Czech Republic's goal tally first.

List of international goals scored by Lukáš Červ
| No. | Date | Venue | Opponent | Score | Result | Competition |
|---|---|---|---|---|---|---|
| 1. | 14 October 2024 | Wrocław Stadium, Wrocław, Poland | Ukraine | 1–0 | 1–1 | 2024–25 UEFA Nations League |
| 2. | 5 September 2025 | Podgorica City Stadium, Podgorica, Montenegro | Montenegro | 1–0 | 2–0 | 2026 FIFA World Cup qualification |
