= Svetozar Marković (footballer) =

Serbian association footballer

Personal information
- Date of birth: 23 March 2000 (age 26)
- Place of birth: Bijeljina, Bosnia and Herzegovina
- Height: 1.85 m (6 ft 1 in)
- Position: Centre-back

Team information
- Current team: Slovan Bratislava
- Number: 15

Youth career
- 2006–2011: Radnik Bijeljina
- 2011–2017: Partizan
- 2015–2016: → Teleoptik (loan)

Senior career*
Years	Team	Apps	(Gls)
2017–2019	Partizan	36	(2)
2019–2022	Olympiacos	0	(0)
2020	→ AEL (loan)	8	(0)
2020–2021	→ Partizan (loan)	24	(1)
2022–2024	Partizan	53	(5)
2024–2026	Viktoria Plzeň	28	(1)
2026–	Slovan Bratislava	22	(3)

International career^{‡}
2015–2016	Serbia U16	9	(1)
2016–2017	Serbia U17	11	(0)
2017–2019	Serbia U18	2	(0)
2018–2021	Serbia U21	18	(1)
- * Club domestic league appearances and goals as of 24 October 2026 ‡ National team caps and goals as of 16 November 2021

Svetozar Marković born 23 March 2000) is a Bosnian professional footballer who plays as a centre-back for Slovak club Slovan Bratislava.

== Club career ==
=== Partizan ===
==== 2017–18 season ====
Born in Bijeljina, a city in Bosnia Herzegovina, Marković played in the youth academy of local club Radnik. He joined Partizan in 2011, after passing the club's camp at Jahorina in 2009. As a product of youth academy and club scholar, Marković started studying at Belgrade sports gymnasium in 2015, along with teammates Dušan Vlahović and Bojan Bojić. He was also loaned to satellite club Teleoptik for the 2015–16 campaign. In summer 2017, Marković joined senior squad as a captain of cadet team, passing the pre-season with the first squad. Marković made his official debut for Partizan, replacing Bojan Ostojić in the 88 minute of the Serbian Cup match against Rtanj Boljevac, played on 11 October 2017. Marković made his first continental appearance for the club replacing Léandre Tawamba in 90 minute of the match against Viktoria Plzeň on 15 February 2018. Marković made his Serbian SuperLiga debut on 11 March 2018, playing a full-time in away 2–0 victory over Čukarički. Several days later, on 14 March, Marković made an assist to Nemanja R. Miletić in 2–0 cup victory over Javor Ivanjica. Marković had also been elected for a player of the match after the game. Marković scored his first goal for Partizan in 5–0 home victory over Borac Čačak in final fixture match of the regular season, played on 5 April 2018. Marković played his first Eternal Derby on 14 April 2018, archiving a full-time in 2–1 defeat. In May 2018, Marković awarded as the best debutant 2017–18 Serbian SuperLiga campaign. Marković won 2017–18 Serbian Cup with the club, beating Mladost Lučani on 23 May 2018, which was his first trophy in professional career.

==== 2018–19 season ====
In summer 2018, Marković passed the whole pre-season preparations with the first team in Slovenia. He made his first continental appearance for Partizan in starting line-up in the first leg match of the first qualifying round for 2018–19 UEFA Europa League campaign, against Rudar Pljevlja. He played a full-time away game as a centre-back pairing with Marc Valiente, who had been replaced by Nemanja R. Miletić in the 77th minute. Marković scored his first continental goal for Partizan and his second in professional career in 3–2 victory over Nordsjælland on 16 August 2018. On 2 September 2018, Marković scored the only goal in 1–0 home victory over OFK Bačka on the Nemanja Nikolić's assist.

=== Olympiacos ===
==== 2019–20 season ====
On 8 July 2019, reports subsequently confirmed that Markovic has signed a five-year contract with Greek giants Olympiacos on a transfer fee in the region of €1.5 million. The talented defender commented on the transfer: "I have moved to a very big club in Olympiacos. I’m happy about this and it shows that I am making progress in the sport. Yes, it’s hard for me to leave my country and my team, but Partizan will always be in my heart."

=== Viktoria Plzeň ===
On 30 August 2024, Marković signed a three-year contract with Czech First League club Viktoria Plzeň.

=== Slovan Bratislava ===
On 14 January 2026, Marković signed a four-and-half-year contract with Slovak First Football League club Slovan Bratislava.

== International career ==
Despite being born and raised in Bosnia and Herzegovina, Marković, as an ethnic Serb, started playing with Serbia national under-16 football team in 2015. He capped mostly matches with the team, scoring a goal in a match against Latvia on 15 May 2016. As a regular member of Serbian under-17 national team, Marković was called in squad for the 2017 UEFA European Under-17 Championship by coach Perica Ognjenović. In August 2017, Marković was called into the Serbia 19 squad, for the memorial "Stevan Vilotić - Ćele", but failed to make a debut during the tournament. In December 2017, Perica Ognjenović called Marković in Serbian under-18 national team for the tournament in Israel. He made his debut for the team in 1–0 defeat against home team on 11 December same year, and also played against Germany next day. As a coach of the Serbian under-21 level, Goran Đorović included Marković to the squad for competitive matches against Macedonia and Russia in September 2018.

== Style of play ==
"Sveta archived this game like the one against Čukarički, played without a mistake. I've said a million times, and now I repeat that he is the future of the club."

— Nemanja R. Miletić, an interview after the victory over Javor Ivanjica, March 2018

At the beginning of his youth career, Marković used to play as a defensive midfielder or winger through the categories of Radnik Bijeljina. Coming to Partizan's youth setup, he has adapted as a centre-back. As a player with strong team role effect, Marković has been ordered to lead youth team as a captain. During the match against Javor Ivanjica in March 2018, coach Miroslav Đukić moved him to right-back position, which allowed him to break through the opponent's side and make an assist for a goal. Standing at 6 ft 1/2 inches (1.84 m), and being a right-legged footballer, Marković is sometimes compared with Sergio Ramos.

== Career statistics ==
As of 3 November 2026

Appearances and goals by club, season and competition
Club	Season	League			Cup (Note: Includes Serbian Cup and Greek Cup)		Continental		Total	
Club	Season	Division	Apps	Goals	Apps	Goals	Apps	Goals	Apps	Goals
Partizan	2017–18	Serbian SuperLiga	11	1	5	0	1 (Note: Appearance(s) in the UEFA Europa League)	0	17	1
Partizan	2018–19	Serbian SuperLiga	25	1	1	1	7	1	33	3
Partizan	Total		36	2	6	1	8	1	50	4
Olympiacos	2019–20	Super League Greece	0	0	2	0	0	0	2	0
Olympiacos	2021–22	Super League Greece	0	0	1	0	3 (Note: Two appearances in UEFA Champions League, one appearance in UEFA Europa League)	0	4	0
Olympiacos	Total		0	0	3	0	3	0	6	0
AEL (loan)	2019–20	Super League Greece	8	0	0	0	0	0	8	0
Partizan (loan)	2020–21	Serbian SuperLiga	24	1	5	1	0	0	29	2
Partizan	2022–23	Serbian SuperLiga	22	2	1	0	11 (Note: One appearance in UEFA Europa League, ten appearances and one goal in UEFA Conference League)	1	34	3
Partizan	2023–24	Serbian SuperLiga	27	2	3	0	4 (Note: Appearance(s) in UEFA Conference League)	0	34	2
Partizan	2024–25	Serbian SuperLiga	4	1	0	0	6 (Note: Two appearances in UEFA Champions League, two appearances and one goal in UEFA Europa League, two appearances in UEFA Conference League)	1	10	2
Partizan	Total		53	5	4	0	21	2	78	7
Viktoria Plzeň	2024–25	Czech First League	17	1	2	0	12	0	31	1
Viktoria Plzeň	2025–26	Czech First League	11	0	1	0	7	1	19	1
Viktoria Plzeň	Total		28	1	3	0	19	1	50	2
Slovan Bratislava	2025–26	Slovak First Football League	13	2	1	0	—		14	2
Slovan Bratislava	2026–27	Slovak First Football League	8	1	0	0	9 (Note: Appearances in UEFA Champions League)	0	17	1
Slovan Bratislava	Total		21	3	1	0	9	0	31	3
Career total			170	12	22	2	60	4	252	18

== Honours ==
Partizan

- Serbian Cup: 2017–18 2018–19

Individual

- 2017–18 Serbian SuperLiga: best debutant
