= Christophe Kabongo =

Czech footballer (born 2003)

Personal information
- Date of birth: 27 August 2003 (age 23)
- Place of birth: Prague, Czech Republic
- Height: 1.88 m (6 ft 2 in)
- Positions: Forward; attacking midfielder

Team information
- Current team: Viktoria Plzeň
- Number: 25

Youth career
- 2009–2011: Meteor Prague
- 2011–2020: Sparta Prague

Senior career*
Years	Team	Apps	(Gls)
2020–2024	Lommel	14	(1)
2023–2024	→ Železiarne Podbrezová (loan)	38	(9)
2024–	Viktoria Plzeň	23	(5)
2024–	Viktoria Plzeň B	4	(1)
2026	→ Mladá Boleslav (loan)	12	(4)

International career^{‡}
2019	Czech Republic U17	2	(0)
2021	Czech Republic U19	1	(0)
2023	Czech Republic U20	1	(0)
2023–2024	Czech Republic U21	6	(4)
2026–	Czech Republic	3	(0)
- * Club domestic league appearances and goals as of 20 October 2026 ‡ National team caps and goals as of 15 November 2026

Christophe Kabongo (born 27 August 2003) is a Czech professional footballer who plays as a forward for Viktoria Plzeň and the Czech Republic national team.

On 11 February 2026, Kabongo joined Mladá Boleslav on a half-year loan deal.

== Personal life ==
Kabongo was born on 27 August 2003 in Prague, Czech Republic, to a Congolese father and Russian mother.

== Career statistics ==
=== Club ===
As of 16 May 2026.

Club	Season	League			Cup		Continental		Other		Total	
Club	Season	Division	Apps	Goals	Apps	Goals	Apps	Goals	Apps	Goals	Apps	Goals
Lommel	2020–21	Challenger Pro League	7	0	0	0	–		0	0	7	0
Lommel	2021–22	Challenger Pro League	2	0	1	0	–		–		3	0
Lommel	2022–23	Challenger Pro League	5	1	0	0	–		–		5	1
Lommel	Total		14	1	1	0	–		–		15	1
Železiarne Podbrezová (loan)	2022–23	Slovak First Football League	10	5	–		–		–		10	5
Železiarne Podbrezová (loan)	2023–24	Slovak First Football League	28	4	6	5	–		–		34	9
Železiarne Podbrezová (loan)	Total		38	9	6	5	–		–		44	14
Viktoria Plzeň	2024–25	Czech First League	1	0	0	0	0	0	—		1	0
Viktoria Plzeň	2025–26	Czech First League	12	0	2	1	2 (Note: Appearances in UEFA Europa League)	0	—		16	1
Viktoria Plzeň	Total		13	0	2	1	2	0	—		17	1
Viktoria Plzeň B	2024–25	Czech National Football League	4	1	—		—		—		4	1
Mladá Boleslav (loan)	2025–26	Czech First League	12	4	1	0	—		—		13	4
Career total			81	15	10	6	2	0	0	0	93	21

=== International ===
As of match played 15 November 2026

Appearances and goals by national team and year
National team	Year	Apps	Goals
Czech Republic	2026	3	0
Total		3	0
