= Prince Kwabena Adu =

Ghanaian footballer (born 2003)

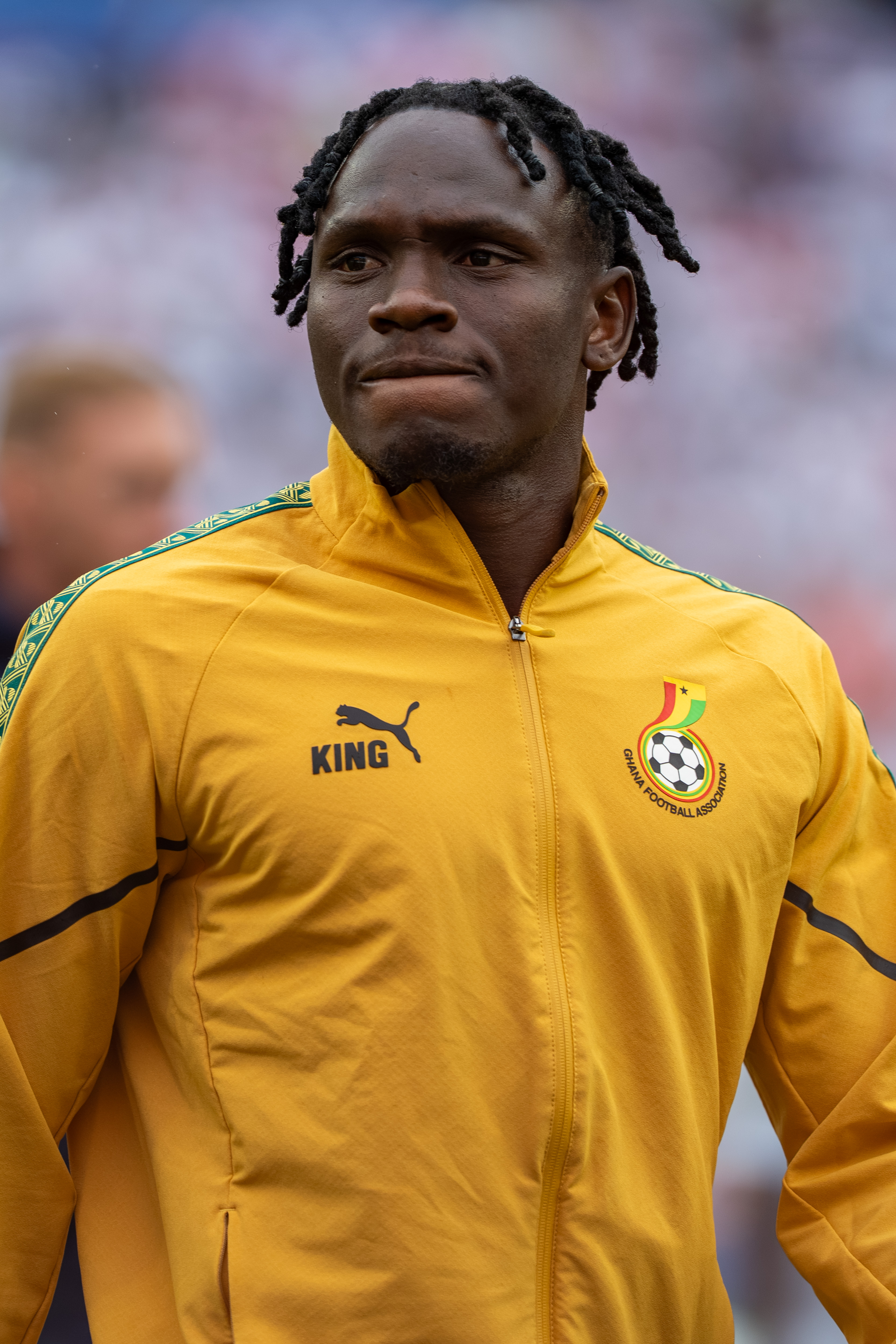
- Kwabena Adu with Ghana in 2026

Personal information
- Date of birth: 23 September 2003 (age 23)
- Place of birth: Sampa, Bono Region, Ghana
- Height: 1.79 m (5 ft 10 in)
- Position: Midfielder

Team information
- Current team: Viktoria Plzeň
- Number: 80

Youth career
- –2019: Bechem United

Senior career*
Years	Team	Apps	(Gls)
2019–2022	Bechem United	31	(10)
2023	Isloch Minsk Raion	14	(6)
2023–2024	Kryvbas Kryvyi Rih	15	(3)
2024–	Viktoria Plzeň	58	(14)

International career^{‡}
2025–	Ghana	8	(0)
- * Club domestic league appearances and goals as of 9 November 2026 ‡ National team caps and goals as of 4 July 2026

Prince Kwabena Adu (born 23 September 2003) is a Ghanaian footballer who plays for Viktoria Plzeň and the Ghana national team. He was included in The Guardian's "Next Generation 2020".

== Club career ==
On 1 September 2023, Kwabena Adu joined Ukrainian Premier League club Kryvbas Kryvyi Rih on a free transfer and signed a four-year contract.

On 28 August 2024, Kwabena Adu signed a three-year contract with Czech First League club Viktoria Plzeň.

== International career ==
Adu was called up to the Ghana national team for a set of friendly matches in November 2025.

On 2 June 2026, Adu was named in head coach Carlos Queiroz's 26-man squad for the 2026 FIFA World Cup.

== Career statistics ==
=== Club ===
As of 9 February 2025.

Club	Season	League			Cup		Continental		Other		Total	
Club	Season	Division	Apps	Goals	Apps	Goals	Apps	Goals	Apps	Goals	Apps	Goals
Bechem United	2019	Ghana Premier League	11	1	0	0	–		0	0	11	1
Bechem United	2019–20	Ghana Premier League	13	8	0	0	–		0	0	13	8
Bechem United	2020–21	Ghana Premier League	7	1	0	0	–		0	0	7	1
Isloch Minsk Raion	2023	Belarusian Premier League	14	6	2	2	–		0	0	16	8
Kryvbas Kryvyi Rih	2023–24	Ukrainian Premier League	12	2	0	0	–		0	0	12	2
Kryvbas Kryvyi Rih	2024–25	Ukrainian Premier League	3	1	0	0	3	1	0	0	6	2
Viktoria Plzeň	2024–25	Czech First League	18	5	1	0	11	3	0	0	30	8
Career total			78	24	3	2	14	4	0	0	95	30
