= Cadu (footballer, born 1997) =

Brazilian footballer

Personal information
- Full name: Carlos Eduardo Lopes Cruz
- Date of birth: 8 August 1997 (age 29)
- Place of birth: Salvador, Brazil
- Height: 1.77 m (5 ft 10 in)
- Position: Right midfielder

Team information
- Current team: Ferencváros
- Number: 20

Youth career
- –2018: Bahia

Senior career*
Years	Team	Apps	(Gls)
2018–2019	Fluminense de Feira	1	(0)
2019–2020	EC Olímpia	2	(0)
2020–2022	Pardubice	69	(14)
2022–2025	Viktoria Plzeň	63	(6)
2022–2023	→ Baník Ostrava (loan)	26	(5)
2025–	Ferencváros	12	(1)
- * Club domestic league appearances and goals as of 30 May 2026

Carlos Eduardo Lopes Cruz (born 8 August 1997), commonly known as Cadu, is a Brazilian professional footballer who plays as a midfielder for Ferencváros.

== Club career ==
=== FK Pardubice ===
Cadu made his league debut for FK Pardubice against FK Dukla Prague on 10 June 2020.

=== Baník Ostrava (loan) ===
On 8 September 2022 he was loaned to Baník Ostrava in Czech First League.

=== Ferencváros ===
He transfermed tó Ferencváros ín the summer of 2025. On 9 May 2026, he won the 2025–26 Magyar Kupa season with Ferencváros by beating Zalaegerszegi TE 1–0 in the 2026 Magyar Kupa final at Puskás Aréna.

== Career statistics ==
As of 26 November 2023

Club	Season	League			Cup		Continental		Other		Total	
Club	Season	Division	Apps	Goals	Apps	Goals	Apps	Goals	Apps	Goals	Apps	Goals
Pardubice	2019–20	Czech National Football League	9	3	—		—		—		9	3
Pardubice	2020–21	Czech First League	29	7	1	1	—		—		30	8
Pardubice	2021–22	Czech First League	31	4	2	0	—		—		33	4
Pardubice	Total		69	14	3	1	—		—		72	15
Viktoria Plzeň	2022–23	Czech First League	2	0	0	0	0	0	—		2	0
Viktoria Plzeň	2023–24	Czech First League	30	4	4	1	12	1	—		46	6
Viktoria Plzeň	Total		32	4	4	1	12	1	0	0	48	6
Baník Ostrava (loan)	2022–23	Czech First League	26	5	2	1	—		—		28	6
Career total			127	23	9	3	12	1	0	0	148	27

== Honours ==
Ferencváros

- Hungarian Cup: 2025–26
