= Václav Jemelka =

Czech footballer

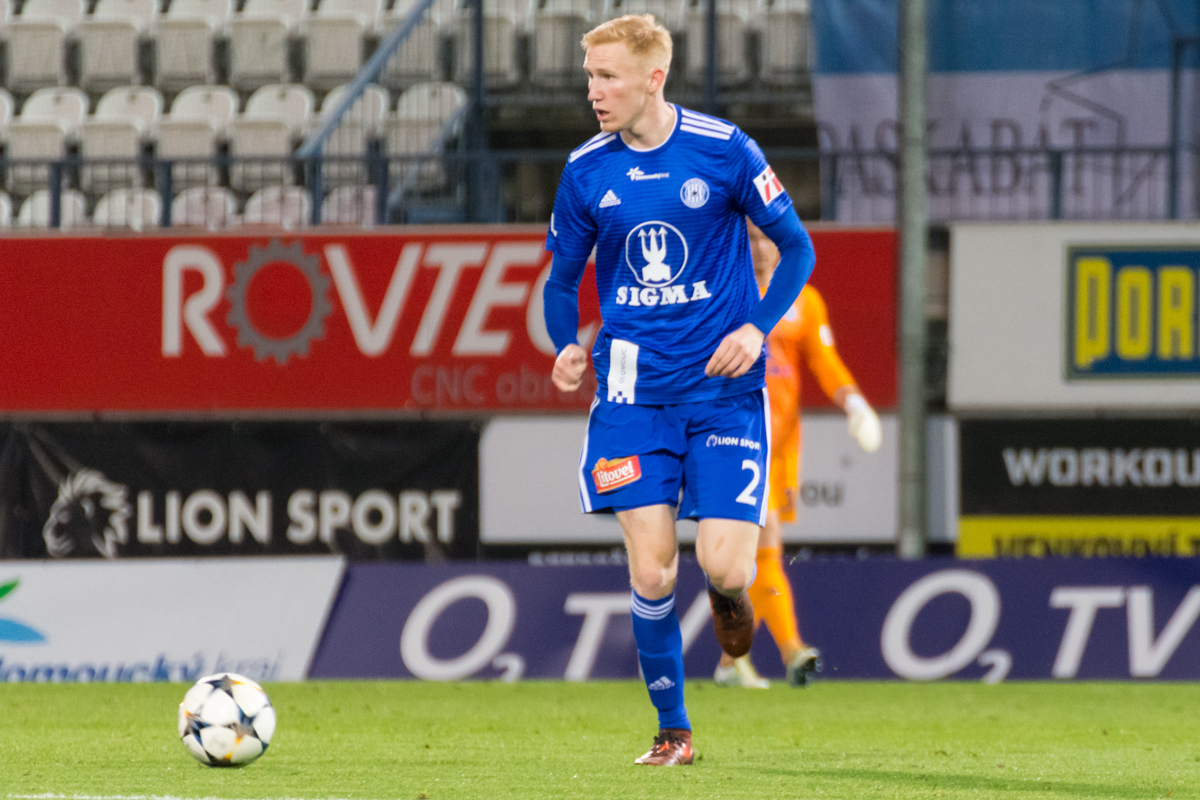

Personal information
- Date of birth: 23 June 1995 (age 31)
- Place of birth: Uničov, Czech Republic
- Height: 1.87 m (6 ft 2 in)
- Position: Defender

Team information
- Current team: Viktoria Plzeň
- Number: 21

Youth career
- 2002–2011: Uničov
- 2011–2016: Sigma Olomouc

Senior career*
Years	Team	Apps	(Gls)
2016–2022	Sigma Olomouc	128	(7)
2020–2021	→ OH Leuven (loan)	23	(0)
2022–	Viktoria Plzeň	101	(5)

International career^{‡}
2020–	Czech Republic	8	(0)
- * Club domestic league appearances and goals as of 27 May 2026 ‡ National team caps and goals as of 15 June 2024

Václav Jemelka (born 23 June 1995) is a Czech professional footballer who plays as a defender for Viktoria Plzeň and the Czech Republic national team. Jemelka started his professional career with Sigma Olomouc, spending six years with the club including a season where he played on loan in Belgium for OH Leuven.

== Career ==
Jemelka was one of five players promoted from Sigma Olomouc's B-team to the senior team ahead of the 2016–17 season, which the club played in the second-tier Czech National Football League having been relegated the previous season. He made his Czech First League debut on 30 July 2017 in a match against Mladá Boleslav. His first goal came in a controversial manner in Sigma's 1–1 draw at Slavia Prague on 10 September 2017, scoring the goal with his hand. After playing the first six games of the 2020–21 season, Jemelka joined Belgian Pro League side OH Leuven on loan for the rest of the season in October 2020.

Jemelka joined Viktoria Plzeň in August 2022, signing a three-year contract with the club. His first competitive goal for Plzeň came against Mladá Boleslav; Jemelka scored the second goal in a 2–0 Czech First League win in October 2022.

== International career ==
On 11 November 2020, Jemelka debuted for the Czech senior squad in a friendly match against Germany. In March 2021, he was called up for the 2022 FIFA World Cup qualification to replace the injured Tomáš Kalas, but felt ill and had to stay at home for the match against Estonia national football team. Jemelka also was not included in the Czech Republic's UEFA Euro 2020 squad due to another health issue.

== Career statistics ==
=== Club ===
As of 22 June 2024

Club	Season	League			Cup		Continental		Other		Total	
Club	Season	Division	Apps	Goals	Apps	Goals	Apps	Goals	Apps	Goals	Apps	Goals
Sigma Olomouc	2015–16	Czech First League	0	0	1	0	—		—		1	0
Sigma Olomouc	2016–17	Czech National Football League	7	0	0	0	—		—		7	0
Sigma Olomouc	2017–18	Czech First League	27	1	1	0	—		—		28	1
Sigma Olomouc	2018–19	Czech First League	28	2	3	1	3	0	—		34	3
Sigma Olomouc	2019–20	Czech First League	31	3	5	0	—		—		36	3
Sigma Olomouc	2020–21	Czech First League	6	0	0	0	—		—		6	0
Sigma Olomouc	2021–22	Czech First League	27	1	3	0	—		—		30	1
Sigma Olomouc	2022–23	Czech First League	2	0	0	0	—		—		2	0
Sigma Olomouc	Total		128	7	16	1	3	0	—		144	8
OH Leuven (loan)	2020–21	Belgian First Division A	23	0	2	0	—		—		25	0
Viktoria Plzeň	2022–23	Czech First League	30	1	1	0	8	0	—		39	1
Viktoria Plzeň	2023–24	Czech First League	19	0	4	0	9	0	—		32	0
Viktoria Plzeň	Total		49	1	5	0	17	0	0	0	71	1
Career total			200	8	20	1	20	0	0	0	240	9

=== International ===
As of 15 June 2024

Czech Republic
Year	Apps	Goals
2020	2	0
2021	1	0
2022	4	0
2023	1	0
Total	8	0
