= Jiří Panoš =

Czech footballer (born 2007)

Personal information
- Full name: Jiří Maxim Panoš
- Date of birth: 15 November 2007 (age 18)
- Place of birth: Czech Republic
- Position: Winger

Team information
- Current team: Viktoria Plzeň
- Number: 20

Youth career
- 2014–2019: Klatovy
- 2019–2024: Viktoria Plzeň

Senior career*
| Years | Team | Apps | (Gls) |
| 2024– | Viktoria Plzeň | 26 | (0) |

International career^{‡}
| 2022 | Czech Republic U15 | 3 | (0) |
| 2022–2023 | Czech Republic U16 | 12 | (3) |
| 2023– | Czech Republic U17 | 12 | (0) |
- * Club domestic league appearances and goals as of 27 May 2026 ‡ National team caps and goals as of 05:40, 11 August 2024 (UTC)

Jiří Maxim Panoš (born 15 November 2007) is a Czech professional footballer who plays as a winger for FC Viktoria Plzeň.

== Club career ==
Panoš is a product of the youth academies of SK Klatovy 1898 and Viktoria Plzeň. On 19 July 2024, he signed his first professional contract with Viktoria Plzeň. The next day he made his senior and professional debut with the club as a late substitute in a 3–1 Czech First League win over Dukla Prague on 20 July 2024. He scored in a 2–1 UEFA Europa League win over Kryvbas Kryvyi Rih on 8 August 2024 at the age of 16, and in doing so became the youngest Czech goalscorer in European competition.

== International career ==
Panoš is a youth international for the Czech Republic, having been called up to the Czech Republic U17s for the 2024 UEFA European Under-17 Championship.
