= Doosan Arena =

Stadium in Plzeň, Czech Republic

- Štruncovy sady
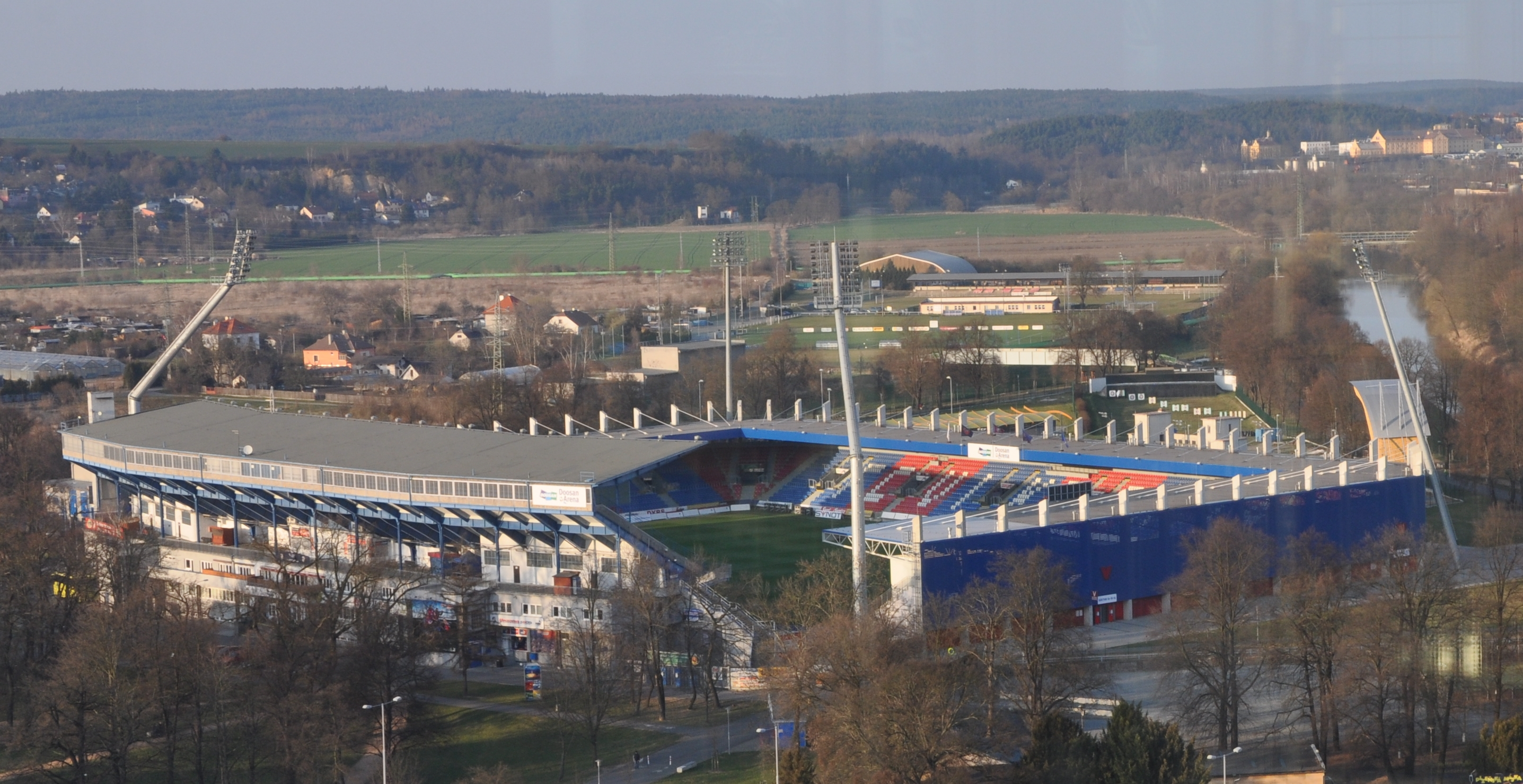
- UEFA
- Interactive map of Doosan Arena
- Full name: Doosan Arena
- Former names: Stadion města Plzně (1955–2012)
- Location: Štruncovy sady 3, Plzeň, Czech Republic, 301 12
- Coordinates: 49°45′00″N 13°23′08″E
- Owner: The city of Plzeň
- Operator: FC Viktoria Plzeň
- Capacity: 11,700
- Surface: Grass; Field
- Record attendance: 35.000; Spartak Plzeň 1–7 FK Dukla Praha, September, 1961
- Field size: 105 by 68 metres (115 by 74 yd)

Construction
- Groundbreaking: 1953
- Built: 1953–1955
- Opened: 1955
- Renovated: 2003, 2011

Tenants
- FC Viktoria Plzeň (1955–present); Czech Republic national football team (selected matches)

Website
- www.fcviktoria.cz

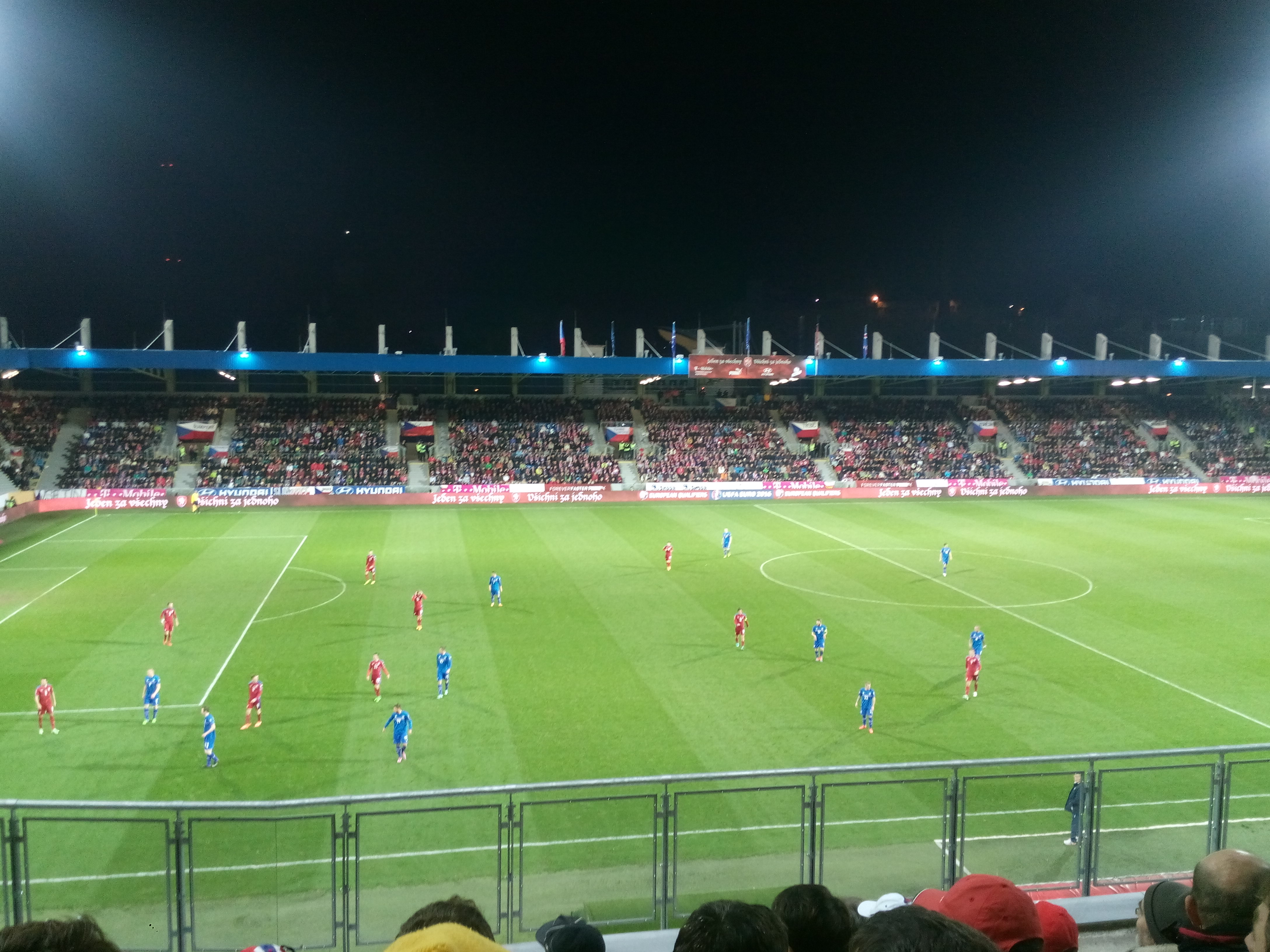
Doosan Arena, Czech Republic 2–1 Iceland, 2014

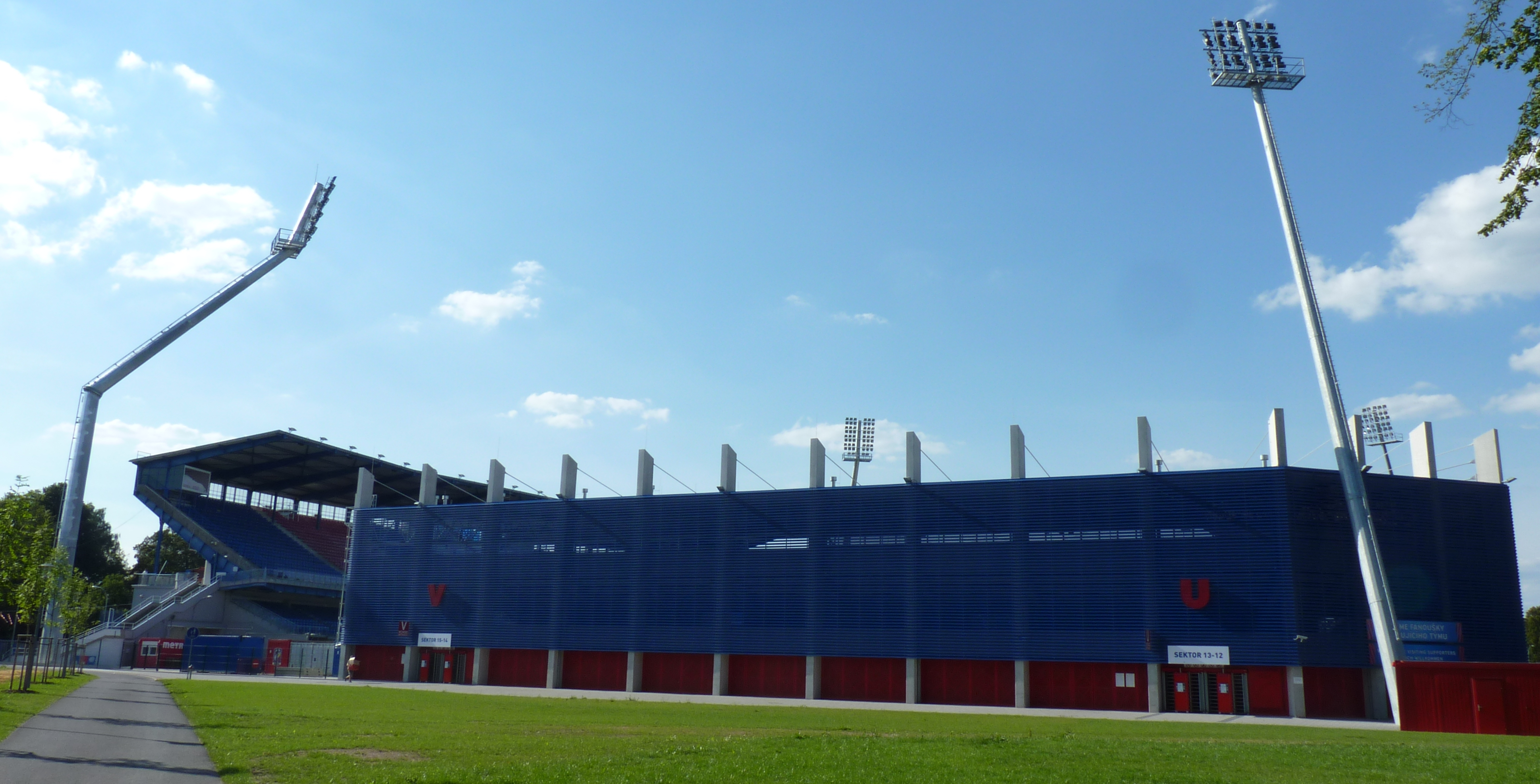
Doosan Arena

Doosan Arena, previously known as Stadion města Plzně (Plzeň City Stadium), is a football stadium in Plzeň, Czech Republic. It is located in Štrunc Park, near the confluence of the Mže and Radbuza rivers. The stadium is the home ground of FC Viktoria Plzeň. The stadium holds 11,700 people. It is also known as Stadion ve Štruncových sadech (Stadium in Štrunc Park), named after Emil Štrunc, a former regional chieftain of the Sokol Movement (some people incorrectly think it is named after a famous local footballer Stanislav Štrunc).

== History ==
The stadium was opened in 1955 for the regional Spartakiad. After various construction enlargements, its capacity was 35,000 people, 7,600 of which were seated. In 2002–03 it underwent reconstruction to comply with the needs of football association and the capacity lowered significantly to 7,425 people.

=== 2011 reconstruction ===
In April 2011, work costing approximately 360 million Czech koruna got under way to modernise the stadium in line with UEFA criteria. While the reconstruction was in progress, the capacity of the stadium was reduced to 3,500 spectators. At the end of August 2011, part of the 2011 reconstruction had finished, leaving the stadium with a new capacity of around 8,500. In December 2011, the reconstruction was finished with a resultant capacity of almost 12,000.

In 2011, Plzeň played in the 2011–12 UEFA Champions League group stage. However, home matches were played at Synot Tip Arena in Prague due to the reconstruction. In January 2012, the stadium was approved for use in Plzeň's 2011–12 UEFA Europa League match with Schalke 04.

== Average attendance ==
- 1993/94 – 5,774
- 1994/95 – 4,573
- 1995/96 – 3,441
- 1996/97 – 4,626
- 1997/98 – 3,819
- 1998/99 – 4,033
- 2000/01 – 3,073
- 2003/04 – 3,622
- 2005/06 – 4,118
- 2006/07 – 4,836
- 2007/08 – 3,828
- 2008/09 – 4,005
- 2009/10 – 3,629
- 2010/11 – 6,415
- 2011/12 – 7,009
- 2012/13 – 10,046
- 2013/14 – 10,089
- 2014/15 – 10,868
- 2015/16 – 10,618
- 2016/17 – 10,040
- 2017/18 – 9,576
- 2018/19 – 9,021
- 2019/20 – 7,732
- 2020/21 – 2,698
- 2021/22 – 6,430
- 2022/23 – 8,779
- 2023/24 – 9,030
- 2024/25 – 8,553
- 2025/26 – 9,451

== International matches ==
Doosan Arena has hosted one friendly and nine competitive matches of the Czech Republic national football team

12 October 2012 2014 FIFA World Cup qualification Group B	Czech Republic	3–1	Malta	Plzeň, Czech Republic
18:00 CEST (UTC+02); Match 724/216	Gebre Selassie 34'; Pekhart 52'; Rezek 67'	FIFA Report	Briffa 38'	Stadium: Stadion města Plzně; Attendance: 10,358; Referee: Salmanov (Azerbaijan)

16 November 2014 UEFA Euro 2016 qualifying Group A	Czech Republic	2–1	Iceland	Plzeň, Czech Republic
20:45 CET (UTC+01); Match 744/236	Kadeřábek 45+1'; Halldórsson 61' (o.g.)	UEFA Report	R. Sigurðsson 9'	Stadium: Doosan Arena; Attendance: 11,324; Referee: Stark (Germany)

3 September 2015 UEFA Euro 2016 qualifying Group A	Czech Republic	2–1	Kazakhstan	Plzeň, Czech Republic
20:45 CEST (UTC+02); Match 748/240	Škoda 74', 86'	Report	Logvinenko 21'	Stadium: Doosan Arena; Attendance: 10,572; Referee: Strömbergsson (Sweden)

8 October 2017 2018 FIFA World Cup Qualifying	Czech Republic	5–0	San Marino	Plzeň, Czech Republic
20:45 (20:45 UTC+1)	Krmenčík 8', 23'; Kopic 27'; Novák 71'; Kadlec 83'	Report		Stadium: Doosan Arena; Attendance: 5,625; Referee: Alex Troleis (France)

14 November 2019 UEFA Euro 2020 qualifying Group A	Czech Republic	2–1	Kosovo	Plzeň, Czech Republic
20:45 UTC+1	Král 71'; Čelůstka 79'	Report	Nuhiu 50'	Stadium: Doosan Arena; Attendance: 10,986; Referee: Rocchi (Italy)

15 November 2020 2020–21 UEFA Nations League B	Czech Republic	1–0	Israel	Plzeň, Czech Republic
20:45 UTC+1	Darida 7'	Report		Stadium: Doosan Arena; Attendance: 0 Referee: Srđan Jovanović (Serbia)

18 November 2020 2020–21 UEFA Nations League B	Czech Republic	2–0	Slovakia	Plzeň, Czech Republic
20:45 UTC+1	Souček 17'; Ondrášek 55'	Report		Stadium: Doosan Arena; Attendance: 0 Referee: Cüneyt Çakır (Turkey)

8 September 2021 Friendly	Czech Republic	1–1	Ukraine	Plzeň, Czech Republic
20:45 UTC+2	Vydra 90+4'	Report	Korniyenko 27'	Stadium: Doosan Arena; Attendance: 5,231; Referee: Filip Glova (Slovakia)

15 October 2023 UEFA Euro 2024 qualifying	Czech Republic	1–0	Faroe Islands	Plzeň, Czech Republic
18:00 UTC+2	Souček 76' (pen.)	Report		Stadium: Doosan Arena; Attendance: 9,115; Referee: Rohit Saggi (Norway)

6 June 2025 2026 FIFA World Cup Qualifying	Czech Republic	2–0	Montenegro	Plzeň, Czech Republic
20:45 UTC+2	Hložek 23'; Schick 65'	Report		Stadium: Doosan Arena; Attendance: 10,889; Referee: Serdar Gözübüyük (Netherlands)

== See also ==
- List of football stadiums in the Czech Republic
- Lists of stadiums
