= 2018–19 FC Viktoria Plzeň season =

Viktoria Plzeň
2018–19 season
- President: Adolf Šádek
- Head coach: Pavel Vrba
- Stadium: Doosan Arena
- Czech First League: 2nd
- Czech Cup: Round of 16
- UEFA Champions League: Group stage
- Europa League: Round of 32
- Top goalscorer: League: Michael Krmenčík (7); All: Michael Krmenčík (9)
Home colours	Away colours	Third colours

The 2018–19 season is FC Viktoria Plzeň's 26th season in the Czech First League. The team is competing in Czech First League, the Czech Cup, and the UEFA Champions League.

Pavel Vrba returned to manage the club in the summer of 2017. He had previously served as manager from 2008 to 2013 before leaving to manage the national team.

== Players ==
As of 2 September 2018

Note: Flags indicate national team as defined under FIFA eligibility rules; some limited exceptions apply. Players may hold more than one non-FIFA nationality.

No.	Pos.	Nation	Player
1	GK	SVK	Matúš Kozáčik
2	DF	CZE	Lukáš Hejda
4	DF	CZE	Roman Hubník (captain)
6	MF	SVK	Roman Procházka
7	MF	CZE	Tomáš Hořava
8	DF	CZE	David Limberský
9	MF	CZE	Martin Zeman
10	MF	CZE	Jan Kopic
11	MF	CZE	Milan Petržela
14	DF	CZE	Radim Řezník
15	FW	CZE	Michal Krmenčík
16	GK	CZE	Aleš Hruška

No.	Pos.	Nation	Player
17	MF	SVK	Patrik Hrošovský
18	FW	CZE	Tomáš Chorý
19	MF	CZE	Jan Kovařík
20	MF	CZE	Pavel Bucha
21	DF	CZE	Tomáš Hájek
24	DF	CZE	Milan Havel
25	MF	CZE	Aleš Čermák
26	MF	CZE	Daniel Kolář
30	GK	CZE	Jakub Šiman
37	FW	CZE	Jakub Řezníček
44	DF	CZE	Luděk Pernica
90	MF	NGR	Ubong Moses Ekpai

=== Out on loan ===
Note: Flags indicate national team as defined under FIFA eligibility rules; some limited exceptions apply. Players may hold more than one non-FIFA nationality.

No.	Pos.	Nation	Player
—	MF	CZE	Dominik Janošek (to 1. FC Slovácko)
—	MF	CZE	Michal Hlavatý (to FK Baník Sokolov)
—	MF	CZE	Jan Suchan (to MFK Karviná)

No.	Pos.	Nation	Player
—	MF	CZE	Ondřej Štursa (to Dukla Prague)
—	FW	SVK	Marek Bakoš (to FC Spartak Trnava)
—	DF	CZE	Jiří Piroch (to MFK Karviná)

== Transfers ==
=== In ===
Date	Pos.	Player	Age	Moving from	Fee
28 May 2018	MF	(Nigeria) Ubong Moses Ekpai	22	(Czech Republic) FC Fastav Zlín	Undisclosed
1 June 2018	DF	(Czech Republic) Luděk Pernica	27	(Czech Republic) FK Jablonec	Undisclosed
1 June 2018	MF	(Slovakia) Roman Procházka	29	(Bulgaria) PFC Levski Sofia	Free
12 June 2018	MF	(Czech Republic) Dominik Janošek	19	(Czech Republic) 1. FC Slovácko	Undisclosed
30 June 2018	MF	(Czech Republic) Ondřej Štursa	18	(Czech Republic) FC Viktoria Plzeň	Free
30 June 2018	FW	(Czech Republic) Tomáš Poznar	29	(Czech Republic) FC Baník Ostrava	Loan Return
30 June 2018	FW	(Czech Republic) Jakub Řezníček	30	(Czech Republic) SK Sigma Olomouc	Loan Return
30 June 2018	MF	(Czech Republic) Jan Suchan	22	(Czech Republic) FK Senica	Loan Return
30 June 2018	GK	(Czech Republic) Jakub Šiman	23	(Czech Republic) TJ Jiskra Domažlice	Loan Return
30 June 2018	DF	(Czech Republic) Jiří Piroch	22	(Czech Republic) FK Jablonec	Loan Return
30 June 2018	DF	(Slovenia) Erik Janža	25	(Cyprus) Pafos FC	Loan Return
30 June 2018	MF	(Czech Republic) Václav Pilař	29	(Czech Republic) FC Slovan Liberec	Loan Return
9 July 2018	MF	(Czech Republic) Pavel Bucha	20	(Czech Republic) SK Slavia Prague	Free

=== Out ===
Date	Pos.	Player	Age	Moving from	Fee
1 July 2018	MF	(Austria) Andreas Ivanschitz	34	Unknown	Free
2 July 2018	MF	(Czech Republic) Dominik Janošek	20	(Czech Republic) 1. FC Slovácko	Loan
4 July 2018	MF	(Czech Republic) Václav Pilař	29	(Czech Republic) SK Sigma Olomouc	Undisclosed
6 July 2018	DF	(Czech Republic) Jiří Piroch	22	(Czech Republic) MFK Karviná	Loan
14 July 2018	MF	(Czech Republic) Jan Suchan	22	(Czech Republic) MFK Karviná	Loan
17 July 2018	MF	(Czech Republic) Ondřej Štursa	18	(Czech Republic) Dukla Prague	Loan
18 July 2018	FW	(Czech Republic) Tomáš Poznar	29	(Czech Republic) FC Fastav Zlín	Free
25 July 2018	DF	(Slovenia) Erik Janža	25	(Croatia) NK Osijek	Undisclosed
3 August 2018	FW	(Slovakia) Marek Bakoš	25	(Slovakia) FC Spartak Trnava	Loan
30 August 2018	MF	(Croatia) Diego Živulić	26	(Cyprus) Pafos FC	Undisclosed
31 August 2018	GK	(Czech Republic) Jakub Šiman	23	(Czech Republic) Olympia Radotín	Undisclosed
1 July 2018	GK	(Czech Republic) Petr Bolek	34	Free agent	None

== Pre-season and friendlies ==
19 June 2018 Friendly	Senco Doubravka	0–7	Viktoria Plzeň	Plzeň
17:00 CEST (UTC+02:00)		Report	Chorý 17'; Štursa 37', 39'; Havel 67'; Bakoš 78', 82'; Navrátil 90'	Stadium: Sportovní areál SK SENCO Doubravka; Attendance: 950

23 June 2018 Friendly	SK Klatovy 1898	0–6	Viktoria Plzeň	Klatovy
14:30 CEST (UTC+02:00)		Report	Kovařík 14'; Krmenčík 22'; Havel 27'; Ekpai 51'; Řezníček 59'; Chorý 66'	Stadium: Na Rozvoji; Attendance: 1,210

27 June 2018 Friendly	Baník Sokolov	0–2	Viktoria Plzeň	Sokolov
17:00 CEST (UTC+02:00)		Report	Krmenčík 3'; Čermák 68'	Stadium: Stadion FK Baník Sokolov; Attendance: 950

1 July 2018 Friendly	Dynamo České Budějovice	3–4	Viktoria Plzeň	České Budějovice
10:30 CEST (UTC+02:00)	Pešek 24'; Táborský 26'; Pouček 45'	Report	Řezníček 22', 28', 41' (pen.); Ekpai 72'	Stadium: Stadion Střelecký ostrov Attendance: 1,480

6 July 2018 Friendly	Viktoria Plzeň (Czech Republic)	4–0	(Russia) Akhmat Grozny	Westendorf, Austria
17:30 CEST (UTC+02:00)	Krmenčík 8', 31'; Kopic 44'; Procházka 58'	Report		Stadium: Waldstadion Westendorf; Attendance: 50

10 July 2018 Friendly	Viktoria Plzeň (Czech Republic)	2–0	(Austria) Wacker Innsbruck	Westendorf, Austria
17:00 CEST (UTC+02:00)	Ekpai 14'; Petržela 88'	Report		Stadium: Waldstadion Westendorf; Attendance: 200

14 July 2018 Friendly	Viktoria Plzeň (Czech Republic)	0–2	(Ukraine) Dynamo Kyiv	Schwaz, Austria
15:30 CEST (UTC+02:00)		Report	Buyalskyi 61'; Smyrnyi 87'	Stadium: Silberstadt-Arena; Attendance: 200

25 July 2018 Friendly	Viktoria Plzeň	10–1	Jiskra Domažlice	Plzeň
16:30 CEST (UTC+02:00)	Kopic 11', 15'; Čermák 23'; Řezník 28'; Krmenčík 47', 50' (pen.); Chorý 66', 71'; Petržela 83', 90'	Report	Došlý 74'	Stadium: Stadion Luční ulice Attendance: 600

6 September 2018 Friendly	Sokol Kozolupy	3–17	Viktoria Plzeň	Kozolupy
17:00 CEST (UTC+02:00)		Report		Attendance: 450

8 January 2019 Friendly	Viktoria Plzeň	6–0	Jiskra Ústí nad Orlicí	Plzeň
16:00 CET (UTC+01:00)	Reznicek 29'; Pacinda 45+1'; Ekpai 51'; Beauguel 62', 76'; Hrosovsky 70'	Report		Stadium: Doosan Arena

== Competitions ==
=== Czech First League ===
==== Regular stage ====
===== League table =====
Pos	Team	Pld	W	D	L	GF	GA	GD	Pts	Qualification or relegation
1	Slavia Prague	30	23	3	4	72	23	+49	72	Qualification for the championship group
2	Viktoria Plzeň	30	21	5	4	47	27	+20	68	Qualification for the championship group
3	Sparta Prague	30	17	6	7	52	27	+25	57	Qualification for the championship group
4	Jablonec	30	15	6	9	53	26	+27	51	Qualification for the championship group
5	Baník Ostrava	30	13	6	11	38	36	+2	45	Qualification for the championship group

Source: Fortuna liga, Soccerway
Rules for classification: 1) Points; 2) Head-to-head points; 3) Head-to-head goal difference; 4) Head-to-head goals scored; 5) Goal difference; 6) Goals scored; 7) Fair-play ranking; 8) Draw.

===== Results summary =====
Overall								Home						Away					
Pld	W	D	L	GF	GA	GD	Pts	W	D	L	GF	GA	GD	W	D	L	GF	GA	GD
30	21	5	4	47	27	+20	68	14	1	0	30	7	+23	7	4	4	17	20	−3

Source: See results

===== Results by round =====
Round	1	2	3	4	5	6	7	8	9	10	11	12	13	14	15	16	17	18	19	20	21	22	23	24	25	26	27	28	29	30
Ground	A	H	A	H	A	H	A	H	A	H	H	A	H	A	H	A	H	A	H	A	H	A	H	A	A	H	A	H	A	H
Result	W	W	W	W	W	W	L	W	L	W	W	D	W	W	D	D	W	W	W	D	W	W	W	L	L	W	W	W	D	W
Position	2	2	2	3	1	1	2	2	3	2	2	2	2	2	2	2	2	2	2	2	2	2	2	2	2	2	2	2	2	2

Source: See results
A = Away; H = Home; W = Win; D = Draw; L = Loss

===== Matches =====
20 July 2018 1	Dukla Prague	1–3	Viktoria Plzeň	Dejvice
18:30 CEST (UTC+2)	Douděra 7'; Tetour (yellow card) 59'; Holík (yellow card) 87'	Report	Hořava 69'; Podaný 71' (o.g.); Krmenčík 88' (pen.)	Stadium: Stadion Juliska; Attendance: 5,039; Referee: Pavel Franěk

30 July 2018 2	Viktoria Plzeň	1–0	Slovan Liberec	Plzeň
18:00 CEST (UTC+2)	Krmenčík 61'	Report	Kacharaba (yellow card) 10'; Mara (yellow card) 57'; Koscelník (yellow card) 90'	Stadium: Doosan Arena; Attendance: 10,753; Referee: Karel Hrubeš

4 August 2018 3	Sigma Olomouc	0–1	Viktoria Plzeň	Olomouc
19:00 CEST (UTC+2)	Yunis (yellow card) 90'	Report	Petržela (yellow card) 23'; Procházka 88'	Stadium: Andrův stadion Attendance: 7,049; Referee: Ondřej Berka

11 August 2018 4	Viktoria Plzeň	1–0	Fastav Zlín	Plzeň
19:00 CEST (UTC+2)	Kopic (yellow card) 69' (yellow-red card) 90'; Krmenčík 77'	Report	Hnaníček (yellow card) 44'; Džafić (yellow card) 72'; Matejov (yellow card) 72'; Bačo (yellow card) 90'	Stadium: Doosan Arena; Attendance: 10,102; Referee: Miroslav Zelinka

19 August 2018 5	Karviná	0–1	Viktoria Plzeň	Karviná
15:00 CEST (UTC+2)	Janečka (yellow card) 17'; Budínský (yellow card) 83'	Report	Krmenčík 6'; Zeman (yellow card) 90'	Stadium: Městský stadion Attendance: 3,942; Referee: Pavel Orel

26 August 2018 6	Viktoria Plzeň	6–1	Mladá Boleslav	Plzeň
15:00 CEST (UTC+2)	Krmenčík 21', 45', 52' (yellow card) 34'; Řezník 62'; Řezníček 90', 90'	Report	Konaté (yellow card) 30'; Komlichenko 44'; Takács (yellow card) 48'	Stadium: Doosan Arena; Attendance: 10,532; Referee: Radek Příhoda

1 September 2018 7	Slavia Prague	4–0	Viktoria Plzeň	Prague
19:00 CEST (UTC+2)	Souček 4', 90'; Stoch 40' (pen.); Hušbauer (yellow card) 51'; Zmrhal 71'; Ngadeu-Ngadjui (yellow card) 87'	Report	Hubník (yellow card) 28' (yellow-red card) 38'; Limberský (yellow card) 38'; Kozáčik (yellow card) 38'; Krmenčík (yellow card) 90'	Stadium: Eden Arena; Attendance: 17,338; Referee: Petr Ardeleánu

15 September 2018 8	Viktoria Plzeň	1–0	Opava	Plzeň
19:00 CEST (UTC+2)	Hořava (yellow card) 32'; Hrošovský 87' (pen.)	Report	Pučkáč (yellow card) 45'; Juřena (yellow card) 81'	Stadium: Doosan Arena; Attendance: 9,636; Referee: Ondřej Berka

24 September 2018 9	Jablonec	3–0	Viktoria Plzeň	Jablonec nad Nisou
18:00 CEST (UTC+2)	Trávník 27', 39'; Chramosta 56'	Report	Limberský (yellow card) 22'; Kolář (yellow card) 35'; Kopic (yellow card) 74'	Stadium: Stadion Střelnice; Attendance: 2,782; Referee: Pavel Franěk

28 September 2018 10	Viktoria Plzeň	1–0	Sparta Prague	Plzeň
19:00 CEST (UTC+2)	Limberský (yellow card) 15'; Hrošovský (yellow card) 30'; Petržela (yellow card) 55'; Radaković 76' (o.g.)	Report	Tetteh (yellow card) 15'; Šural (yellow card) 40'; Kanga (yellow card) 60'; Kaya (yellow card) 89'; Vácha (yellow card) 90'; Nhamoinesu (yellow card) 90'; Stanciu (red card) 90+3'	Stadium: Doosan Arena; Attendance: 11,489; Referee: Pavel Julínek

7 October 2018 11	Viktoria Plzeň	1–0	Teplice	Plzeň
15:00 CEST (UTC+2)	Čermák (yellow card) 18' (goal) 60'; Hejda (yellow card) 33'	Report	Čmovš (yellow card) 57'; Ljevaković (yellow card) 86'; Diviš (yellow card) 90+2'	Stadium: Doosan Arena; Attendance: 9,581; Referee: Karel Hrubeš

19 October 2018 12	Bohemians 1905	2–2	Viktoria Plzeň	Prague
18:00 CEST (UTC+2)	Helal 24' (pen.); Bartek (yellow card) 35'; Záviška 64'	Report	Schumacher 34' (o.g.); Procházka 66'; Zeman (yellow card) 76'; Petržela (yellow card) 90+3'	Stadium: Ďolíček; Attendance: 5,000; Referee: Ondřej Pechanec

28 October 2018 13	Viktoria Plzeň	2–1	Slovácko	Plzeň
15:00 CET (UTC+1)	Havel 36'; Procházka 67' (pen.)	Report	Rezek (yellow card) 59'; Daníček 69'; Hofmann (yellow card) 71'	Stadium: Doosan Arena; Attendance: 7,235; Referee: Emanuel Marek

3 November 2018 14	FC Baník Ostrava	0–1	Viktoria Plzeň	Ostrava
15:00 CET (UTC+1)	Šašinka (yellow card) 87'; Stronati (yellow card) 88'	Report	Kopic 45'; Limberský (yellow card) 85'	Stadium: Městský stadion Attendance: 12,919; Referee: Zbynek Proske

11 November 2018 15	Viktoria Plzeň	1–1	Příbram	Plzeň
15:00 CET (UTC+1)	Petržela 32'	Report	Fantiš 19'; Soldát (yellow card) 48'; Antwi (yellow card) 59'; Katidis (yellow card) 66'	Stadium: Doosan Arena; Attendance: 7,849; Referee: Ondřej Ginzel

23 November 2018 16	FC Slovan Liberec	1–1	Viktoria Plzeň	Liberec
18:00 CET (UTC+1)	Karafiát (yellow card) 52'; Dorley (yellow card) 67'; Pešek 71'; Ševčík (yellow card) 90+3'	Report	Chorý (yellow card) 32'; Hejda (red card) 64'; Řezník (yellow card) 78'; Kovařík 84'	Stadium: Stadion u Nisy; Attendance: 4,555; Referee: Pavel Orel

2 December 2018 17	Viktoria Plzeň	2–0	Sigma Olomouc	Plzeň
17:00 CET (UTC+1)	Chorý 22' (yellow card) 45+1'; Sladký 43' (o.g.)	Report	Vepřek (yellow card) 68'	Stadium: Doosan Arena; Attendance: 5,316; Referee: Pavel Julínek

7 December 2018 18	Fastav Zlín	0–2	Viktoria Plzeň	Zlín
18:00 CET (UTC+1)	Matejov (yellow card) 52'; Jiráček (yellow card) 90+2'	Report	Chorý 4'; Kovařík 8'; Petržela (yellow card) 51'	Stadium: Letná Stadion; Attendance: 3,472; Referee: Ondřej Lerch

16 December 2018 19	Viktoria Plzeň	2–1	Karviná	Plzeň
15:00 CET (UTC+1)	Kopic 7'; Procházka 33'; Hubník (yellow card) 60'	Report	Ba Loua 67'	Stadium: Doosan Arena; Attendance: 5,521; Referee: Ondřej Pechanec

9 February 2019 20	Mladá Boleslav	1–1	Viktoria Plzeň	Mladá Boleslav
15:00 CET (UTC+1)	Chaluš (yellow card) 45'; Komličenko 76' (pen.)	Report	Procházka (yellow card) 36'; Beauguel 37'; Havel (yellow card) 60'; Hubník (yellow card) 74'; Pernica (yellow card) 77'; Chorý (yellow card) 90'	Stadium: Městský stadion Attendance: 3,491; Referee: Pavel Julínek

17 February 2019 21	Viktoria Plzeň	2–0	Slavia Prague	Plzeň
17:00 CET (UTC+1)	Limberský (yellow card) 20'; Chorý 45'; Beauguel 82'; Hubník (yellow card) 84'	Report	Ševčík (yellow card) 19'; Hušbauer (yellow card) 65'; Olayinka (yellow card) 73'	Stadium: Doosan Arena; Attendance: 11,140; Referee: Pavel Franek

25 February 2019 22	Opava	1–2	Viktoria Plzeň	Opava
18:00 CET (UTC+1)	Žídek (yellow card) 33'; Svozil (yellow card) 52'; Zavadil (yellow card) 66'; Juřena 90+1'	Report	Brabec (yellow card) 6'; Hrošovský 24' (pen.); Chorý (yellow card) 52' (goal) 79'; Hruška (yellow card) 90+3'	Stadium: Stadion v Městských sadech Attendance: 5,186; Referee: Ondřej Lerch

2 March 2019 23	Viktoria Plzeň	1–0	Jablonec	Plzeň
15:00 CET (UTC+1)	Procházka (yellow card) 10' (goal) 22'; Limberský (yellow card) 79'; Bakoš (yellow card) 90+3'	Report	Sobol (yellow card) 7'; Považanec (yellow card) 87'	Stadium: Doosan Arena; Attendance: 8,975; Referee: Emanuel Marek

9 March 2019 24	Sparta Prague	4–0	Viktoria Plzeň	Prague
17:30 CET (UTC+1)	Hložek 10'; Kanga (yellow card) 17' (goal) 29' (pen.); Sáček 68'; Kadlec (yellow card) 90+12'; Pulkrab 90+13'	Report	Kovařík (yellow card) 50' (yellow-red card) 90+8'; Chorý (yellow card) 73'	Stadium: Generali Arena; Attendance: 16,110; Referee: Ondřej Pechanec

15 March 2019 25	Teplice	2–1	Viktoria Plzeň	Teplice
18:00 CET (UTC+1)	Hora 5'; Shejbal (yellow card) 25'; Moulis 31'; Žitný (yellow card) 78'; Grigar (yellow card) 90+5'	Report	Limberský (yellow card) 40'; Chorý (yellow card) 45'; Hrošovský 62'; Hubník (yellow card) 69'; Bakoš (yellow card) 74'	Stadium: Na Stínadlech; Attendance: 3,130; Referee: Karel Hrubeš

31 March 2019 26	Viktoria Plzeň	3–2	Bohemians 1905	Plzeň
17:30 CEST (UTC+2)	Beauguel 7', 11'; Chorý 85'	Report	Hůlka 63'; Jindřišek 73'	Stadium: Doosan Arena; Attendance: 9,362; Referee: Ondřej Berka

7 April 2019 27	Slovácko	0–1	Viktoria Plzeň	Uherské Hradiště
18:00 CEST (UTC+2)	Havlík (yellow card) 27'; Franić (yellow card) 44'; Divíšek (yellow card) 79'; Hofmann (yellow card) 86'	Report	Hrošovský 28' (pen.); Chorý (yellow card) 31'; Procházka (yellow card) 86'; Hruška (yellow card) 90'; Bakoš (yellow card) 90'	Stadium: Městský fotbalový stadion Attendance: 5,173; Referee: Emanuel Marek

13 April 2019 28	Viktoria Plzeň	2–1	Baník Ostrava	Plzeň
18:00 CEST (UTC+2)	Chorý 45'; Řezník (yellow card) 57'; Beauguel 85' (yellow card) 87' (yellow-red card) 90'	Report	Stronati 39' (yellow card) 78'; Fleišman (yellow card) 41'; Fillo (yellow card) 58'	Stadium: Doosan Arena; Attendance: 9,725; Referee: Pavel Orel

21 April 2019 29	Příbram	1–1	Viktoria Plzeň	Příbram
17:00 CEST (UTC+2)	Matoušek 37'	Report	Pačinda 31'; Kayamba (yellow card) 55'; Řezník (yellow card) 88'	Stadium: Na Litavce; Attendance: 6,172; Referee: Ondřej Pechanec

27 April 2019 30	Viktoria Plzeň	4–0	Dukla Prague	Plzeň
17:00 CEST (UTC+2)	Procházka 6'; Hubník (yellow card) 20'; Kopic 36', 40'; Hořava 90+2'	Report	Ďurica (yellow card) 26'	Stadium: Doosan Arena; Attendance: 8,104; Referee: Milan Matějček

==== Championship group ====
===== League table =====
Pos	Team	Pld	W	D	L	GF	GA	GD	Pts	Qualification
1	Slavia Prague (C)	35	26	5	4	79	26	+53	83	Qualification for the Champions League play-off round
2	Viktoria Plzeň	35	24	6	5	57	32	+25	78	Qualification for the Champions League second qualifying round
3	Sparta Prague	35	20	6	9	59	33	+26	66	Qualification for the Europa League third qualifying round
4	Jablonec	35	17	6	12	58	32	+26	57	Qualification for the Europa League second qualifying round
5	Baník Ostrava	35	13	8	14	39	43	−4	47	Qualification for the Europa League play-offs final
6	Slovan Liberec	35	12	10	13	34	32	+2	46	

Source: Fortuna liga, Soccerway
Rules for classification: 1) Points; 2) Head-to-head points; 3) Head-to-head goal difference; 4) Head-to-head goals scored; 5) Goal difference; 6) Goals scored; 7) Fair-play ranking; 8) Draw.
(C) Champions

===== Results summary =====
Overall								Home						Away					
Pld	W	D	L	GF	GA	GD	Pts	W	D	L	GF	GA	GD	W	D	L	GF	GA	GD
5	3	1	1	10	5	+5	10	2	1	0	7	2	+5	1	0	1	3	3	0

Source: See results

===== Results by round =====
Round	1	2	3	4	5
Ground	H	A	H	A	H
Result	W	L	W	W	D
Position	2	2	2	2	2

Source: See results
A = Away; H = Home; W = Win; D = Draw; L = Loss

===== Matches =====
5 May 2019 1	Viktoria Plzeň	2–1	Jablonec	Plzeň
18:00 CEST (UTC+2)	Chorý (yellow card) 13'; Holeš 83' (o.g.); Beauguel 88'	Report	Doležal 11'; Hovorka (yellow card) 45+2'; Trávník (yellow card) 87'; Holeš (yellow card) 90+2'	Stadium: Doosan Arena; Attendance: 7,943; Referee: Ondřej Berka

12 May 2019 2	Slavia Prague	3–1	Viktoria Plzeň	Prague
18:00 CEST (UTC+2)	Masopust 81'; Souček 87' (pen.); Traoré 89'	Report	Kayamba (yellow card) 52'; Procházka (yellow card) 59'; Hořava (yellow card) 70'; Řezník (yellow card) 84'; Hejda (yellow card) 84'; Kovařík 90+1'	Stadium: Sinobo Stadium; Attendance: 18,327; Referee: Miroslav Zelinka

15 May 2019 3	Viktoria Plzeň	4–0	Sparta Prague	Plzeň
17:30 CEST (UTC+2)	Hořava 23'; Kovařík 43', 59'; Kopic 61'; Hejda (yellow card) 79'	Report		Stadium: Doosan Arena; Attendance: 8,842; Referee: Emanuel Marek

19 May 2019 4	Slovan Liberec	0–2	Viktoria Plzeň	Liberec
15:00 CEST (UTC+2)	Musa (yellow card) 59'; Dorley (yellow card) 89'	Report	Hořava 8' (yellow card) 72'; Pernica (yellow card) 53'; Kopic (yellow card) 56'; Řezník (yellow card) 68'; Chorý (yellow card) 89'; Hrošovský 90' (pen.)	Stadium: Stadion u Nisy; Attendance: 4,488; Referee: Pavel Franěk

26 May 2019 5	Viktoria Plzeň	1–1	Baník Ostrava	Plzeň
15:00 CEST (UTC+2)	Pernica 5'; Petržela (yellow card) 24'; Beauguel (yellow card) 29'	Report	Procházka 66'; Fillo (yellow card) 82'	Stadium: Doosan Arena; Attendance: 7,787; Referee: Martin Nenadál

=== Czech Cup ===
11 October 2018 Third round	MFK Vyškov	1–5	Viktoria Plzeň	Vyškov
16:00 CEST (UTC+2)	Matocha (yellow card) 12'; Vintr 55'	Summary	Chorý 5', 25', 45+1', 49'; Řezníček 29'	Stadium: Stadion Vyskov; Attendance: 2,463; Referee: Jakub Vojkovsky

31 October 2018 Fourth round	Viktoria Plzeň	2–3	Baník Ostrava	Plzeň
17:30 CEST (UTC+2)	Chorý 34' (yellow card) 68'; Bucha (yellow card) 65'; Moses (yellow card) 70'; Procházka 90+5' (pen.); Zeman (yellow card) 91'	Summary	Šašinka 73'; Fleišman 80' (pen.), 111'; Procházka (yellow card) 87' (yellow-red card) 90+5'; Meshchaninov (yellow card) 90'	Stadium: Doosan Arena; Attendance: 3,503; Referee: Miroslav Zelinka

=== UEFA Champions League ===
==== Group stage ====
Pos	Team	Pld	W	D	L	GF	GA	GD	Pts	Qualification
1	(Spain) Real Madrid	6	4	0	2	12	5	+7	12	Advance to knockout phase
2	(Italy) Roma	6	3	0	3	11	8	+3	9	Advance to knockout phase
3	(Czech Republic) Viktoria Plzeň	6	2	1	3	7	16	−9	7 (Note: Head-to-head points: Viktoria Plzeň 4, CSKA Moscow 1.)	Transfer to Europa League
4	(Russia) CSKA Moscow	6	2	1	3	8	9	−1	7	

Source: UEFA
Rules for classification: Group stage tiebreakers
Notes:

19 September 2018 1	Viktoria Plzeň (Czech Republic)	2–2	(Russia) CSKA Moscow	Plzeň, Czech Republic
21:00 CEST (UTC+2)	Krmenčík 29', 41'; Hubník (yellow card) 80'; Řezníček (yellow card) 88'; Kovařík (yellow card) 90+3'; Limberský (yellow card) 90+4'	Report	Yefremov (yellow card) 4'; Chalov 49'; Akhmetov (yellow card) 68'; Bijol (yellow card) 73'; Sigurðsson (yellow card) 82'; Becão (yellow card) 86'; Vlašić 90+5'	Stadium: Doosan Arena; Attendance: 11,312; Referee: Benoît Bastien (France)

2 October 2018 2	Roma (Italy)	5–0	(Czech Republic) Viktoria Plzeň	Rome, Italy
21:00 CEST (UTC+2)	Džeko 3', 40', 90+2'; Ünder 64'; Kluivert 73'; Schick (yellow card) 88'	Report	Hejda (yellow card) 51'	Stadium: Stadio Olimpico; Attendance: 41,243; Referee: Paweł Raczkowski (Poland)

23 October 2018 3	Real Madrid (Spain)	2–1	(Czech Republic) Viktoria Plzeň	Madrid, Spain
21:00 CEST (UTC+2)	Benzema 11'; Isco (yellow card) 32'; Marcelo 55'; Kroos (yellow card) 59'; Ramos (yellow card) 90+4'	Report	Limberský (yellow card) 27'; Hrošovský 78'	Stadium: Santiago Bernabéu; Attendance: 67,356; Referee: Orel Grinfeld (Israel)

7 November 2018 4	Viktoria Plzeň (Czech Republic)	0–5	(Spain) Real Madrid	Plzeň, Czech Republic
21:00 CET (UTC+1)		Report	Benzema 21', 37'; Casemiro 23'; Bale 40'; Nacho (yellow card) 53'; Kroos 67'	Stadium: Doosan Arena; Attendance: 11,483; Referee: Deniz Aytekin (Germany)

27 November 2018 5	CSKA Moscow (Russia)	1–2	(Czech Republic) Viktoria Plzeň	Moscow, Russia
20:55 MSK (UTC+3)	Vlašić 10' (pen.); Oblyakov (yellow card) 13'; Chalov (yellow card) 24'	Report	Hubník (yellow card) 36'; Procházka (penalty missed) 44' 56'; Hrošovský (yellow card) 60'; Hejda 81'; Kopic (yellow card) 90+2'	Stadium: Luzhniki Stadium; Attendance: 52,892; Referee: Danny Makkelie (Netherlands)

12 December 2018 6	Viktoria Plzeň (Czech Republic)	2–1	(Italy) Roma	Plzeň, Czech Republic
18:55 CET (UTC+1)	Limberský (yellow card) 22'; Kovařík 62'; Chorý 72'	Report	Ünder 68'; Kluivert (yellow card) 79'; Pellegrini (yellow card) 89' (yellow-red card) 90+2'	Stadium: Doosan Arena; Attendance: 11,217; Referee: Anthony Taylor (England)

=== UEFA Europa League ===
==== Round of 32 ====
14 February 2019 First leg	Viktoria Plzeň (Czech Republic)	2–1	(Croatia) Dinamo Zagreb	Plzeň, Czech Republic
21:00 CET (UTC+1)	Hubník (yellow card) 10'; Pernica 54', 83'; Procházka (yellow card) 67'; Kovařík (yellow card) 88'	Report	Stojanović (yellow card) 28'; Olmo 41'; Leovac (yellow card) 72'	Stadium: Doosan Arena; Attendance: 9,731; Referee: Serdar Gözübüyük (Netherlands)

21 February 2019 Second leg	Dinamo Zagreb (Croatia)	3–0 (4–2 agg.)	(Czech Republic) Viktoria Plzeň	Zagreb, Croatia
18:55 CET (UTC+1)	Oršić 15'; Hajrović (yellow card) 31'; Dilaver 34' (yellow card) 38'; Petković 73'; Leovac (yellow card) 85'; Olmo (yellow card) 90+5'	Report	Limberský (yellow card) 33' (yellow-red card) 86'; Bakoš (yellow card) 61'; Chorý (yellow card) 86'	Stadium: Stadion Maksimir; Attendance: 25,860; Referee: István Kovács (Romania)
