= 2017–18 FC Viktoria Plzeň season =

Viktoria Plzeň
2017–18 season
- President: Adolf Šádek
- Head coach: Pavel Vrba
- Stadium: Doosan Arena
- Czech First League: 1st (champions)
- Czech Cup: Fourth round
- UEFA Champions League: Third qualifying round
- UEFA Europa League: Round of 16
- Top goalscorer: League: Michael Krmenčík (16); All: Michael Krmenčík (22)
Home colours	Away colours

The 2017–18 season was FC Viktoria Plzeň's 25th season in the Czech First League. The team competed in Czech First League, the Czech Cup, the UEFA Europa League, and the UEFA Champions League.

Pavel Vrba returned to manage the club in the summer of 2017. He had previously served as manager from 2008 to 2013 before leaving to manage the national team.

== Players ==
As of 21 August 2017

Note: Flags indicate national team as defined under FIFA eligibility rules; some limited exceptions apply. Players may hold more than one non-FIFA nationality.

No.	Pos.	Nation	Player
1	GK	SVK	Matúš Kozáčik
2	DF	CZE	Lukáš Hejda
4	DF	CZE	Roman Hubník (captain)
6	MF	CZE	Václav Pilař
7	MF	CZE	Tomáš Hořava
8	DF	CZE	David Limberský
9	MF	CZE	Martin Zeman
10	MF	CZE	Jan Kopic
11	MF	CZE	Milan Petržela
14	DF	CZE	Radim Řezník
15	FW	CZE	Michal Krmenčík
16	GK	CZE	Aleš Hruška
17	MF	SVK	Patrik Hrošovský
18	FW	CZE	Tomáš Chorý
19	MF	CZE	Jan Kovařík

No.	Pos.	Nation	Player
21	DF	CZE	Tomáš Hájek
22	DF	CZE	Jan Baránek Jr.
23	FW	SVK	Marek Bakoš
24	DF	CZE	Milan Havel
25	MF	CZE	Aleš Čermák
26	MF	CZE	Daniel Kolář
28	DF	SVK	Marián Čišovský
29	MF	CRO	Diego Živulić
30	GK	CZE	Dominik Sváček
33	MF	AUT	Andreas Ivanschitz
35	DF	CZE	Filip Vacovský
—	GK	CZE	Petr Bolek
—	GK	CZE	Jakub Šiman
—	MF	CZE	Michal Hlavatý

=== Out on loan ===
Note: Flags indicate national team as defined under FIFA eligibility rules; some limited exceptions apply. Players may hold more than one non-FIFA nationality.

No.	Pos.	Nation	Player
—	DF	SLO	Erik Janža (to Pafos FC)
—	FW	CZE	Tomáš Poznar (to FC Baník Ostrava)
—	MF	CZE	Jan Suchan (to FK Teplice)
—	MF	CZE	Lukáš Pfeifer (to TJ Jiskra Domažlice)
—	MF	CZE	Miloš Kratochvíl (to FC Zbrojovka Brno)
—	MF	CZE	Daniel Boček (to TJ Jiskra Domažlice)
—	DF	CZE	Jiří Piroch (to FK Pardubice)
—	DF	CZE	Martin Rychnovský (to FK Baník Sokolov)

No.	Pos.	Nation	Player
—	MF	CZE	Bohumil Havel (to FK Baník Sokolov)
—	MF	CZE	Jakub Kopřiva (to FC MAS Táborsko)
—	FW	CZE	Lukáš Matějka (to FK Ústí nad Labem)
—	MF	CZE	Lukáš Provod (to FK Baník Sokolov)
—	MF	CZE	Ondřej Ruml (to FK Olympia Prague)
—	FW	CZE	Jakub Řezníček (to SK Sigma Olomouc)

== Transfers ==
=== In ===
Date	Pos.	Player	Age	Moving from	Fee	Notes
30 June 2017	MF	(Czech Republic) Dominik Hradecký	23	(Czech Republic) FK Tachov	Loan Return	
30 June 2017	MF	(Czech Republic) Jan Suchan	21	(Czech Republic) 1. FK Příbram	Loan Return	
30 June 2017	DF	(Czech Republic) Jurij Medvedev	21	(Czech Republic) FK Baník Sokolov	Loan Return	
1 July 2017	MF	(Czech Republic) Aleš Čermák	22	(Czech Republic) AC Sparta Prague	£900k	
1 July 2017	MF	(Croatia) Diego Živulić	25	(Czech Republic) FC Fastav Zlín	Free transfer	
1 July 2017	GK	(Czech Republic) Aleš Hruška	31	(Czech Republic) 1. FK Příbram	Free transfer	
1 July 2017	FW	(Czech Republic) Jakub Řezníček	29	(Czech Republic) FC Zbrojovka Brno	Undisclosed	
1 July 2017	MF	(Czech Republic) Daniel Kolář	31	Free agent	None	
13 July 2017	DF	(Czech Republic) Milan Havel	22	(Czech Republic) Bohemians 1905	Undisclosed	
7 September 2017	GK	(Czech Republic) Jakub Šiman	22	(Czech Republic) FK Baník Sokolov	Loan Return	
31 December 2017	MF	(Czech Republic) Michal Hlavatý	19	(Czech Republic) FK Baník Sokolov	Loan Return	
31 December 2017	FW	(Czech Republic) Lukáš Stratil	23	(Czech Republic) FK Viktoria Žižkov	Loan Return	
31 December 2017	GK	(Czech Republic) Jakub Šiman	22	(Czech Republic) TJ Jiskra Domažlice	Loan Return	
31 December 2017	GK	(Czech Republic) Petr Bolek	33	(Czech Republic) FK Baník Sokolov	Loan Return	
4 January 2018	FW	(Czech Republic) Tomáš Chorý	22	(Czech Republic) Sigma Olomouc		

=== Out ===
Date	Pos.	Player	Age	Moving to	Fee	Notes
1 July 2017	MF	(Slovakia) Martin Chrien	21	(Portugal) S.L. Benfica	£900K	
4 August 2017	DF	(Czech Republic) Aleš Matějů	21	(England) Brighton & Hove Albion F.C.	£2.25M	
21 July 2017	DF	(Czech Republic) Jurij Medvedev	21	(Slovakia) FK Senica	Free transfer	
21 July 2017	MF	(Czech Republic) Dominik Hradecký	23	(Czech Republic) FK Slavoj Vyšehrad	Undisclosed	
1 July 2017	MF	(Czech Republic) Jakub Hromada	21	(Italy) U.C. Sampdoria	Loan Return	

==== Loans Out ====
Date	Pos.	Player	Age	Moving to	Fee	Notes
1 July 2017	FW	(Czech Republic) Tomáš Poznar	28	(Czech Republic) FC Baník Ostrava	Loan	
1 July 2017	MF	(Czech Republic) Michal Hlavatý	19	(Czech Republic) FK Baník Sokolov	Loan	
8 July 2017	MF	(Czech Republic) Jan Suchan	21	(Czech Republic) FK Teplice	Loan	
13 July 2017	DF	(Slovenia) Erik Janža	24	(Cyprus) Pafos FC	Loan	
8 September 2017	MF	(Czech Republic) Petr Bolek	33	(Czech Republic) FK Baník Sokolov	Loan	
8 September 2017	GK	(Czech Republic) Jakub Šiman	22	(Czech Republic) TJ Jiskra Domažlice	Loan	

== Pre-season and friendlies ==
21 June 2017 Friendly	FC Rokycany	1–10	Viktoria Plzeň	Rokycany
17:00 CEST (UTC+02:00)	Grambal 82'	Report	Kolář 8'; Řezníček 15', 37', 39', 44'; Pfeifer 29'; Pilař 31'; Bakoš 55'; Řezník 61'; Vlastní 78' (o.g.)	Stadium: Stadion pod Husovými sady

24 June 2017 Friendly	Petřín Plzeň	0–2	Viktoria Plzeň	Plzeň
10:30 CEST (UTC+02:00)		Report	Levý 37'; Bakoš	Stadium: Stadion TJ Dynamo ZČE Plzeň; Attendance: 500

28 June 2017 Friendly	Viktoria Plzeň	8–1	Ústí nad Labem	Roudná
17:00 CEST (UTC+02:00)	Krmenčík 5', 29'; Kopic 20'; Bakoš 35'; Kolář 62'; Ivanschitz 75'; Petržela 81'; Řezníček 88'	Report	Richter 12'

1 July 2017 Friendly	Viktoria Plzeň	3–2	Baník Sokolov	Plzeň
10:30 CEST (UTC+02:00)	Šiman 48' (o.g.); Suchan 60'; Krmenčík	Report	Machek 79'; Ševčík 88'	Stadium: Doosan Arena

5 July 2017 Friendly	Viktoria Plzeň	5–1	Dynamo České Budějovice	Roudná
17:00 CEST (UTC+02:00)	Krmenčík 22'; Kolář 53', 65'; Bakoš 75'; Suchan 81'	Report	Benát 84'	Attendance: 1,004; Referee: Ondřej Pechanec

11 July 2017 Friendly	Viktoria Plzeň (Czech Republic)	1–5	(Germany) Greuther Fürth	Westendorf, Austria
18:00 CEST (UTC+02:00)	Kopic 60'	Report	Dursun 15', 18', 52'; Omladič 34'; Ernst 61'	Stadium: Waldstadion Westendorf; Attendance: 189

15 July 2017 Friendly	Viktoria Plzeň (Czech Republic)	1–2	(England) Wolverhampton Wanderers	Westendorf, Austria
17:00 CEST (UTC+02:00)	Bakoš 64'	Report	Dicko 17'; Doherty 30'	Stadium: Waldstadion Westendorf; Attendance: 300

18 July 2017 Friendly	Viktoria Plzeň (Czech Republic)	0–1	(England) Watford	Wörgl, Austria
17:00 CEST (UTC+02:00)		Report	Okaka 79'	Stadium: Sportzentrum Wörgl; Attendance: 235

== Competitions ==
=== Czech First League ===
==== League table ====
Pos	Team	Pld	W	D	L	GF	GA	GD	Pts	Qualification or relegation
1	Viktoria Plzeň (C)	30	20	6	4	55	23	+32	66	Qualification for the Champions League group stage
2	Slavia Prague	30	17	8	5	50	19	+31	59	Qualification for the Champions League third qualifying round
3	Jablonec	30	16	8	6	49	27	+22	56	Qualification for the Europa League group stage (Note: Since the winners of the 2017–18 Czech Cup, Slavia Prague, qualified for European competition based on league position, the spot awarded to the cup winners was passed to the third-placed team, the spot awarded to the third-placed team was passed to the fourth-placed team, and the spot awarded to the fourth-placed team was passed to the fifth-placed team.)
4	Sigma Olomouc	30	15	10	5	41	22	+19	55	Qualification for the Europa League third qualifying round
5	Sparta Prague	30	14	11	5	43	25	+18	53	Qualification for the Europa League second qualifying round

Source: Fortuna liga, Soccerway
Rules for classification: 1) Points; 2) Head-to-head points; 3) Head-to-head goal difference; 4) Head-to-head goals scored; 5) Goal difference; 6) Goals scored; 7) Play-off (only if deciding champion, UEFA competitions, or relegation); 8) Draw.
(C) Champions

==== Results summary ====
Overall								Home						Away					
Pld	W	D	L	GF	GA	GD	Pts	W	D	L	GF	GA	GD	W	D	L	GF	GA	GD
30	20	6	4	55	23	+32	66	10	3	2	28	11	+17	10	3	2	27	12	+15

Source: See results

==== Results by round ====
Round	1	2	3	4	5	6	7	8	9	10	11	12	13	14	15	16	17	18	19	20	21	22	23	24	25	26	27	28	29	30
Ground	H	A	H	A	H	A	H	A	H	A	H	A	H	A	A	H	A	H	A	H	A	H	A	H	A	H	A	H	H	A
Result	W	W	W	W	W	W	W	W	W	W	W	W	W	W	D	W	D	L	D	D	W	L	L	D	W	W	L	D	W	W
Position	1	1	1	1	1	1	1	1	1	1	1	1	1	1	1	1	1	1	1	1	1	1	1	1	1	1	1	1	1	1

Source: See results
A = Away; H = Home; W = Win; D = Draw; L = Loss

==== Matches ====
29 July 2017 1	Viktoria Plzeň	4–0	Dukla Prague	Plzeň
17:00 CEST (UTC+2)	Hejda 11'; Hrošovský 16'; Krmenčík 33'; Hořava 42'	Report	Hanousek (yellow card) 19'; Kušnír (yellow card) 81'	Stadium: Doosan Arena; Attendance: 9,624; Referee: Radek Příhoda

6 August 2017 2	Jablonec	0–1	Viktoria Plzeň	Jablonec nad Nisou
16:00 CEST (UTC+2)	Kubista (yellow card) 66'; Mihálik (yellow card) 74'; Trávník (yellow card) 79'	Report	Hájek 11'; Živulić (yellow card) 34'; Kolář (yellow card) 74'; Zeman (yellow card) 75'; Hruška (yellow card) 80'	Stadium: Stadion Střelnice; Attendance: 3,870; Referee: Pavel Královec

12 August 2017 3	Viktoria Plzeň	1–0	Sigma Olomouc	Plzeň
16:00 CEST (UTC+2)	Pilař 69'; Čermák (yellow card) 90'	Report	Chorý (yellow card) 45+3'; Jemelka (yellow card) 64'; Kalvach (yellow card) 90+1'	Stadium: Doosan Arena; Attendance: 10,135; Referee: Ondřej Pechanec

20 August 2017 4	Vysočina Jihlava	1–2	Viktoria Plzeň	Jihlava
17:00 CEST (UTC+2)	Ikaunieks 1'; Zoubele (yellow card) 54'; Vaculík (yellow card) 90'	Report	Hrošovský 64'; Hájek (yellow card) 78'; Řezník (yellow card) 84'; Bakoš 90'	Stadium: Stadion v Jiráskově ulici Attendance: 4,013; Referee: Pavel Julinek

27 August 2017 5	Viktoria Plzeň	3–0	Baník Ostrava	Plzeň
18:30 CEST (UTC+2)	Hubník (yellow card) 5'; Limberský 64'; Krmenčík 78'; Kolář 85'	Report	Azatskyi (yellow card) 67'	Stadium: Doosan Arena; Attendance: 10,407; Referee: Karel Hrubes

9 September 2017 6	Slovan Liberec	0–3	Viktoria Plzeň	Liberec
16:00 CEST (UTC+2)	Folprecht (yellow card) 24'; Karafiát (yellow card) 32'	Report	Krmenčík 7'; Petržela 20'; Kolář (yellow card) 61'; Kopic 78'; Hájek (yellow card) 87'	Stadium: Stadion u Nisy; Attendance: 6,530; Referee: Emanuel Marek

18 September 2017 7	Viktoria Plzeň	2–1	Fastav Zlín	Plzeň
18:00 CEST (UTC+2)	Kolář 12'; Krmenčík 15'; Bakoš (yellow card) 90'	Report	Bačo (yellow card) 21'; Hájek 43' (o.g.); Matejov (yellow card) 74'; Džafić (yellow card) 90+2'	Stadium: Doosan Arena; Attendance: 9,128; Referee: Martin Nenadál

23 September 2017 8	Mladá Boleslav	0–2	Viktoria Plzeň	Mladá Boleslav
18:00 CEST (UTC+2)	Mareš (yellow card) 33'; Magera (yellow card) 58'; Fleišman (yellow card) 60'	Report	Krmenčík 3', 14'; Limberský (yellow card) 33'; Hrošovský (yellow card) 47'; Petržela (yellow card) 52'	Stadium: Městský stadion Attendance: 3,098; Referee: Pavel Franěk

1 October 2017 9	Viktoria Plzeň	2–1	Bohemians 1905	Plzeň
15:00 CEST (UTC+2)	Krmenčík 53'; Havel (yellow card) 69' (goal) 83'; Kopic (yellow card) 88'	Report	Mašek 42'; Luts (yellow card) 62'; Nečas (yellow card) 62'; Kabaev (yellow card) 66'; Dostál (yellow card) 85'	Stadium: Doosan Arena; Attendance: 10,712; Referee: Ondřej Berka

14 October 2017 10	Sparta Prague	0–1	Viktoria Plzeň	Prague
18:00 CEST (UTC+2)	V.Kadlec (yellow card) 10'	Report	Krmenčík (yellow card) 21'; Kolář 38'; Hejda (yellow card) 75'; Havel (yellow card) 84'; Hrošovský (yellow card) 90+2'; Zeman (yellow card) 90+3'	Stadium: Generali Arena; Attendance: 17,134; Referee: Radek Prihoda

21 October 2017 11	Viktoria Plzeň	3–0	Zbrojovka Brno	Plzeň
17:00 CEST (UTC+2)	Krmenčík 30'; Hořava 42'; Kopic 45'; Hájek (yellow card) 72'	Report	Juhar (yellow card) 24'; Pavlík (yellow card) 64'	Stadium: Doosan Arena; Attendance: 9,740; Referee: Ondej Ginzel

28 October 2017 12	MFK Karviná	1–3	Viktoria Plzeň	Karviná
20:15 CEST (UTC+2)	Wágner 49' (yellow card) 86'	Report	Kopic 11'; Krmenčík 34'; Limberský (yellow card) 44'; Řezník (yellow card) 51'; Kolář (yellow card) 63' (goal) 69'	Stadium: Městský stadion Attendance: 3,746; Referee: Zbynek Proske

4 November 2017 13	Viktoria Plzeň	1–0	Slavia Prague	Plzeň
18:00 CET (UTC+1)	Hájek (yellow card) 30'; Kolář 79'	Report	Bořil (yellow card) 45' van Buren (yellow card) 51'	Stadium: Doosan Arena; Attendance: 11,640; Referee: Radek Prihoda

18 November 2017 14	Slovácko	1–4	Viktoria Plzeň	Uherské Hradiště
20:00 CET (UTC+1)	Kubala (yellow card) 86'; Reinberk 90'; Navrátil (yellow card) 90+10'	Report	Kopic (yellow card) 13' (goal) 17', 71'; Limberský (yellow card) 27'; Řezník 36'; Hejda 57'	Stadium: Městský fotbalový stadion Miroslava Valenty; Attendance: 4,302; Referee: Pavel Franek

25 November 2017 15	Teplice	0–0	Viktoria Plzeň	Teplice
15:00 CET (UTC+1)	Susnjar (yellow card) 10'; Král (yellow card) 76'	Report	Limberský (yellow card) 11'; Petržela (yellow card) 38'; Hořava (yellow card) 78'	Stadium: Na Stínadlech; Attendance: 6,183; Referee: Karel Hrubes

2 December 2017 16	Viktoria Plzeň	2–0	Jablonec	Plzeň
19:00 CET (UTC+1)	Krmenčík 18', 80'; Hubník (yellow card) 83'	Report	Holeš (yellow card) 22'; Zelený (yellow card) 49'; Jovović (yellow card) 83'	Stadium: Doosan Arena; Attendance: 8,132; Referee: Ondřej Berka

17 February 2018 17	Sigma Olomouc	0–0	Viktoria Plzeň	Olomouc
16:00 CET (UTC+1)	Sladký (yellow card) 77'; Moulis (yellow card) 89'	Report	Kolář (yellow card) 64'; Hrošovský (yellow card) 87'; Chorý (yellow card) 90'	Stadium: Andrův stadion Attendance: 6,867; Referee: Miroslav Zelinka

26 February 2018 18	Viktoria Plzeň	0–1	Vysočina Jihlava	Plzeň
17:00 CET (UTC+1)	Limberský (yellow card) 36'; Zeman (yellow card) 62'; Hrošovský (yellow card) 89'; Řezník (yellow card) 90'	Report	Tlustý 22'; Levin (yellow card) 42'; Ikaunieks 89'	Stadium: Doosan Arena; Attendance: 4,138; Referee: Pavel Orel

3 March 2018 19	Baník Ostrava	0–0	Viktoria Plzeň	Ostrava
18:00 CET (UTC+1)	Fillo (yellow card) 69'	Report	Petržela (yellow card) 62'; Řezník (yellow card) 71'	Stadium: Městský stadion Attendance: 8,005; Referee: Ondřej Pechanec

10 March 2018 20	Viktoria Plzeň	2–2	Slovan Liberec	Plzeň
17:15 CET (UTC+1)	Chorý 21'; Krmenčík 40'	Report	Pulkrab 38'; Breite 74'	Stadium: Doosan Arena; Attendance: 9,245; Referee: Emanuel Marek

17 March 2018 21	Fastav Zlín	0–1	Viktoria Plzeň	Zlín
17:00 CET (UTC+1)	Hronek (yellow card) 80'	Report	Kolář 12'; Hejda (yellow card) 34'; Chorý (yellow card) 45'; Hájek (yellow card) 47'; Kopic (yellow card) 78'	Stadium: Letná Stadion; Attendance: 3,612; Referee: Pavel Franek

31 March 2018 22	Viktoria Plzeň	1–2	Mladá Boleslav	Plzeň
20:15 CEST (UTC+2)	Bakoš 89'; Chorý (yellow card) 90'	Report	Mareš 40'; Susnjar (yellow card) 46'; Přikryl (yellow card) 50'; Komlichenko (yellow card) 52' (yellow-red card) 58'; Hubínek 79'; Polaček (yellow card) 90'	Stadium: Doosan Arena; Attendance: 8,722; Referee: Miroslav Zelinka

7 April 2018 23	Bohemians 1905	5–2	Viktoria Plzeň	Vršovice
18:00 CEST (UTC+2)	Šmíd 12'; Reiter 23'; Mašek 36', 38'; Tetteh 57' (yellow card) 71'	Report	Kocić 37' (o.g.); Kopic 41'; Hořava (yellow card) 42'; Kovařík 66'; Hrošovský 79'; Hájek (yellow card) 84'	Stadium: Ďolíček; Attendance: 5,000; Referee: Karel Hrubeš

14 April 2018 24	Viktoria Plzeň	2–2	Sparta Prague	Plzeň
18:00 CEST (UTC+2)	Řezník 30' (yellow card) 77'; Krmenčík (yellow card) 31'; Hořava 52'; Hubník (yellow card) 82'	Report	Kadlec 9'; Plavšić 12'; Štetina (yellow card) 28'; Niță (yellow card) 31'; Frýdek (yellow card) 47'; Hovorka (yellow card) 66'	Stadium: Doosan Arena; Attendance: 11,623; Referee: Zbyněk Proske

21 April 2018 25	Zbrojovka Brno	1–3	Viktoria Plzeň	Brno
20:15 CEST (UTC+2)	Sukup (yellow card) 2'; Melichárek (yellow card) 27'; Škoda (yellow card) 63'; Ashiru 81'	Report	Čermák 26', 32', 48'; Kozáčik (yellow card) 82'; Havel (yellow card) 89'	Stadium: Městský fotbalový stadion Srbská; Attendance: 5,137; Referee: Pavel Orel

28 April 2018 26	Viktoria Plzeň	2–0	MFK Karviná	Plzeň
20:15 CEST (UTC+2)	Hořava 39', 90'	Report		Stadium: Doosan Arena; Attendance: 9,378; Referee: Ondřej Berka

5 May 2018 27	Slavia Prague	2–0	Viktoria Plzeň	Prague
18:30 CEST (UTC+2)	Řezník 16' (o.g.); Frydrych (yellow card) 54'; Tecl 58'; Hušbauer 66'; Sýkora (yellow card) 70'	Report	Bakoš (yellow card) 9'; Hubník (yellow card) 36'; Havel (yellow card) 52'; Hořava (yellow card) 53'; Limberský (yellow card) 59'	Stadium: Eden Arena; Attendance: 15,674; Referee: Pavel Franěk

12 May 2018 28	Viktoria Plzeň	1–1	Slovácko	Plzeň
18:30 CEST (UTC+2)	Zeman (yellow card) 58'; Chorý 78'	Report	Reinberk (yellow card) 52'; Navrátil (yellow card) 60'; Kubala 70'; Janošek (yellow card) 76'; Šimko (yellow card) 81'; Břečka (yellow card) 84'; Juroška (yellow card) 90'; Heča (yellow card) 90'	Stadium: Doosan Arena; Attendance: 10,108; Referee: Radek Příhoda

19 May 2018 29	Viktoria Plzeň	2–1	Teplice	Plzeň
16:00 CEST (UTC+2)	Krmenčík 24'; Řezník (yellow card) 51'; Petržela 61'	Report	Ljevaković (yellow card) 63'; Kodeš (yellow card) 72'; Vaněček 85'	Stadium: Doosan Arena; Attendance: 10,911; Referee: Pavel Julínek

26 May 2018 30	Dukla Prague	1–5	Viktoria Plzeň	Dejvice
16:00 CEST (UTC+2)	Preisler 37'	Report	Krmenčík 3', 14', 59'; Čermák 30'; Štursa 66'	Stadium: Stadion Juliska; Attendance: 2,841; Referee: Radek Dubravský

=== Czech Cup ===
5 October 2017 Third round	Viktoria Plzeň	4–1	SFC Opava	Plzeň
17:00 CEST (UTC+2)	Řezníček 3', 83'; Pilař 16'; Bakoš 81'	Report	T.Smola 59'	Stadium: Doosan Arena; Attendance: 3,883; Referee: Radek Dubravský

10 November 2017 Fourth round	Viktoria Plzeň	2–3 (a.e.t.)	Slovácko	Plzeň
18:00 CET (UTC+1)	Hubník 37'; Bakoš 54'; Čermák (yellow card) 92'; Řezníček (yellow card) 112'	Report	Kubala 19'; Sadílek 63'; Hofmann 110'	Stadium: Doosan Arena; Attendance: 3,775; Referee: Emanuel Marek

=== UEFA Champions League ===
==== Qualifying rounds ====
===== Third qualifying round =====
25 July 2017 First leg	FCSB (Romania)	2–2	(Czech Republic) Viktoria Plzeň	Bucharest, Romania
19:30 CEST (UTC+2)	Budescu 37'; Pintilii (yellow card) 47'; Alibec (yellow card) 52'; Teixeira 61'; Gnohéré (yellow card) 79'	Report	Krmenčík 23' (yellow card) 38'; Petržela (yellow card) 26'; Hájek (yellow card) 36'; Havel (yellow card) 44'; Kopic 53' (yellow card) 90+1'	Stadium: Arena Națională; Attendance: 33,795; Referee: Aliyar Aghayev (Azerbaijan)

2 August 2017 Second leg	Viktoria Plzeň (Czech Republic)	1–4 (3–6 agg.)	(Romania) FCSB	Plzeň, Czech Republic
20:15 CEST (UTC+2)	Petržela (yellow card) 24'; Řezník (yellow card) 26'; Živulić (yellow card) 39'; Havel (yellow card) 48'; Krmenčík (yellow card) 61' (red card) 89' (goal) 64'; Hrošovský (yellow card) 72'; Bolek (yellow card) 79'; Bakoš (yellow card) 83'	Report	Bălașa 27' (yellow card) 67'; Popescu (yellow card) 50'; Teixeira 71'; Tănase 76'; Alibec 79' (pen.) (yellow card) 84'	Stadium: Doosan Arena; Attendance: 10,802; Referee: Alejandro Hernández Hernández (Spain)

As a result of losing the third qualifying round, FC Viktoria Plzeň was moved to the play-off round of the Europa League.

=== UEFA Europa League ===
==== Qualifying rounds ====
===== Play-off round =====
17 August 2017 First leg	Viktoria Plzeň (Czech Republic)	3–1	(Cyprus) AEK Larnaca	Plzeň, Czech Republic
20:15 CEST (UTC+2)	Bakoš 29', 74' (pen.) (yellow card) 34'; Kolář 36' (yellow card) 85'	Report	Acorán 8'; Truyols (yellow card) 28'; Laban (yellow card) 73'; Mojsov (yellow card) 87'	Stadium: Doosan Arena; Attendance: 10,031; Referee: Matej Jug (Slovenia)

24 August 2017 Second leg	AEK Larnaca (Cyprus)	0–0 (1–3 agg.)	(Czech Republic) Viktoria Plzeň	Larnaca, Cyprus
18:00 CEST (UTC+2)	Truyols (yellow card) 39'	Report	Bakoš (yellow card) 26'; Hrošovský (yellow card) 45+1'; Hruška (yellow card) 52'; Zeman (yellow card) 53'; Petržela (yellow card) 81'; Limberský (yellow card) 86'	Stadium: AEK Arena; Attendance: 5,300; Referee: Artur Soares Dias (Portugal)

==== Group stage ====
Pos	Team	Pld	W	D	L	GF	GA	GD	Pts	Qualification	PLZ	FCSB	LUG	HBS
1	(Czech Republic) Viktoria Plzeň	6	4	0	2	13	8	+5	12	Advance to knockout phase	—	2–0	4–1	3–1
2	(Romania) FCSB	6	3	1	2	9	7	+2	10	Advance to knockout phase	3–0	—	1–2	1–1
3	(Switzerland) Lugano	6	3	0	3	9	11	−2	9		3–2	1–2	—	1–0
4	(Israel) Hapoel Be'er Sheva	6	1	1	4	5	10	−5	4		0–2	1–2	2–1	—

Source: UEFA
Rules for classification: Group stage tiebreakers

14 September 2017 1	FCSB (Romania)	3–0	(Czech Republic) Viktoria Plzeň	Bucharest, Romania
21:05 CEST (UTC+2)	Budescu 21' (pen.), 44' (yellow card) 55'; Alibec 72'	Report	Hrošovský (yellow card) 34'; Bakoš (yellow card) 90+3'	Stadium: Arena Națională; Attendance: 20,717; Referee: Andris Treimanis (Latvia)

28 September 2017 2	Viktoria Plzeň (Czech Republic)	3–1	(Israel) Hapoel Be'er Sheva	Plzeň, Czech Republic
19:00 CEST (UTC+2)	Petržela 29'; Havel (yellow card) 55'; Kopic 76'; Bakoš 89'	Report	Sahar (yellow card) 47'; Nwakaeme 69'; Taha (yellow card) 86'	Stadium: Doosan Arena; Attendance: 10,314; Referee: István Vad (Hungary)

19 October 2017 3	Lugano (Switzerland)	3–2	(Czech Republic) Viktoria Plzeň	Lucerne, Switzerland
19:00 CEST (UTC+2)	Piccinocchi (yellow card) 29'; Črnigoj (yellow card) 48'; Bottani 63'; Mariani (yellow card) 65'; Carlinhos 69'; Gerndt 88'; Daprelà (yellow card) 90+1'	Report	Bakoš (yellow card) 39' (goal) 90'; Krmenčík 76'; Zeman (yellow card) 90+1'	Stadium: Swissporarena; Attendance: 2,530; Referee: Srđan Jovanović (Serbia)
Note: Lugano played their home matches at Swissporarena, Lucerne, instead of their regular stadium Cornaredo Stadium, Lugano.

2 November 2017 4	Viktoria Plzeň (Czech Republic)	4–1	(Switzerland) Lugano	Plzeň, Czech Republic
21:05 CET (UTC+1)	Krmenčík 4', 19'; Hořava 45'; Čermák 56'; Petržela (yellow card) 72'; Limberský (yellow card) 78'	Report	Mariani 15'; Carlinhos (yellow card) 60'; Daprelà (yellow card) 79'; Sulmoni (yellow card) 85'	Stadium: Doosan Arena; Attendance: 9,483; Referee: Jonathan Lardot (Belgium)

23 November 2017 5	Viktoria Plzeň (Czech Republic)	2–0	(Romania) FCSB	Plzeň, Czech Republic
19:00 CET (UTC+1)	Petržela 49'; Kopic 76'	Report	Man (yellow card) 45+1'; Enache (yellow card) 67'; Budescu (yellow card) 84'	Stadium: Doosan Arena; Attendance: 10,197; Referee: Ivan Bebek (Croatia)

7 December 2017 6	Hapoel Be'er Sheva (Israel)	0–2	(Czech Republic) Viktoria Plzeň	Be'er Sheva, Israel
21:05 CET (UTC+1)	Einbinder (yellow card) 53'; Brown (yellow card) 55'; Taha (yellow card) 76'	Report	Hejda 28'; Hruška (yellow card) 62'; Krmenčík (yellow card) 68'; Limberský (yellow card) 75'; Čermák (yellow card) 80'; Hořava 83'	Stadium: Turner Stadium; Attendance: 10,542; Referee: Aleksandar Stavrev (Macedonia)

==== Knockout phase ====
===== Round of 32 =====
15 February 2018 First leg	Partizan (Serbia)	1–1	(Czech Republic) Viktoria Plzeň	Belgrade, Serbia
21:05 CET (UTC+1)	Mitrović (yellow card) 53' (yellow-red card) 85'; Tawamba 58'	Report	Řezník 81'; Hrošovský (yellow card) 84'	Stadium: Partizan Stadium; Attendance: 17,165; Referee: Anastasios Sidiropoulos (Greece)

22 February 2018 Second leg	Viktoria Plzeň (Czech Republic)	2–0 (3–1 agg.)	(Serbia) Partizan	Plzeň, Czech Republic
19:00 CET (UTC+1)	Krmenčík 67'; Čermák 90'	Report	Pantić (yellow card) 73'; Tošić (yellow card) 88'	Stadium: Doosan Arena; Attendance: 10,185; Referee: Jakob Kehlet (Denmark)

===== Round of 16 =====
8 March 2018 First leg	Sporting CP (Portugal)	2–0	(Czech Republic) Viktoria Plzeň	Lisbon, Portugal
15:05 GMT (UTC)	Montero 45+1', 49'; Battaglia (yellow card) 62'; Coates (yellow card) 67'; Carvalho (yellow card) 73'	Report	Hořava (yellow card) 65'; Limberský (yellow card) 86'	Stadium: Estádio José Alvalade; Attendance: 26,090; Referee: Aleksei Kulbakov

14 March 2018 Second leg	Viktoria Plzeň (Czech Republic)	2–1 (2–3 agg.)	(Portugal) Sporting CP	Plzeň, Czech Republic
14:00 CET (UTC+1)	Bakoš 6', 65'; Řezník (yellow card) 90+1'; Hájek (yellow card) 90+5'; Petržela (yellow card) 108'	Report	Ruiz (yellow card) 78'; Battaglia 105+2'; Dost (yellow card) 120+1'	Stadium: Doosan Arena; Attendance: 9,370; Referee: Tobias Stieler

== Squad statistics ==
As of match played 2 December 2017

=== Appearances and goals ===
No.	Pos	Nat	Player	Total		Czech First League		Czech Cup		UEFA Champions League		UEFA Europa League	
No.	Pos	Nat	Player	Apps	Goals	Apps	Goals	Apps	Goals	Apps	Goals	Apps	Goals
1	GK	(Slovakia) SVK	Matúš Kozáčik	13	0	13	0	0	0	0	0	0	0
2	DF	(Czech Republic) CZE	Lukáš Hejda	25	3	15+1	2	2	0	1	0	6	1
4	DF	(Czech Republic) CZE	Roman Hubník	10	1	4	0	1	1	0	0	5	0
6	MF	(Czech Republic) CZE	Václav Pilař	10	2	0+4	1	2	1	0	0	2+2	0
7	MF	(Czech Republic) CZE	Tomáš Hořava	22	4	11+3	2	0+1	0	0+1	0	5+1	2
8	DF	(Czech Republic) CZE	David Limberský	18	1	10+1	1	0	0	1	0	6	0
9	MF	(Czech Republic) CZE	Martin Zeman	21	0	6+6	0	2	0	0+2	0	2+3	0
10	MF	(Czech Republic) CZE	Jan Kopic	26	8	16	5	0	0	2	1	6+2	2
11	MF	(Czech Republic) CZE	Milan Petržela	24	3	10+3	1	0+2	0	2	0	6+1	2
13	GK	(Czech Republic) CZE	Petr Bolek	2	0	0	0	0	0	2	0	0	0
14	DF	(Czech Republic) CZE	Radim Řezník	26	1	16	1	0	0	2	0	8	0
15	FW	(Czech Republic) CZE	Michal Krmenčík	20	16	14	11	0	0	2	2	3+1	3
16	GK	(Czech Republic) CZE	Aleš Hruška	13	0	3	0	2	0	0	0	8	0
17	MF	(Slovakia) SVK	Patrik Hrošovský	25	2	15	2	0	0	2	0	8	0
19	MF	(Czech Republic) CZE	Jan Kovařík	2	0	0	0	2	0	0	0	0	0
21	DF	(Czech Republic) CZE	Tomáš Hájek	21	1	13	1	1	0	2	0	5	0
23	FW	(Slovakia) SVK	Marek Bakoš	23	7	10+2	1	2	2	0+2	0	3+4	4
24	DF	(Czech Republic) CZE	Milan Havel	16	1	6+4	1	2	0	2	0	2	0
25	MF	(Czech Republic) CZE	Aleš Čermák	14	1	2+4	0	1+1	0	0	0	3+3	1
26	MF	(Czech Republic) CZE	Daniel Kolář	25	6	13+2	5	0+1	0	2	0	7	1
29	MF	(Croatia) CRO	Diego Živulić	16	0	7+1	0	2	0	2	0	1+3	0
33	MF	(Austria) AUT	Andreas Ivanschitz	5	0	0+2	0	1+1	0	0	0	0+1	0
37	FW	(Czech Republic) CZE	Jakub Řezníček	17	2	9	0	2	2	0+1	0	2+3	0
Players away from the club on loan:
Players who appeared for Viktoria Plzeň but left during the season:

=== Goal scorers ===
As of match played 2 December 2017

Place	Position	Nation	Number	Name	Czech First League	Czech Cup	UEFA Champions League	UEFA Europa League	Total
1	FW	(Czech Republic)	15	Michal Krmenčík	11	2	2	3	18
2	MF	(Czech Republic)	10	Jan Kopic	5	0	1	2	8
3	MF	(Czech Republic)	26	Daniel Kolář	5	0	0	1	6
4	FW	(Czech Republic)	23	Marek Bakoš	1	0	0	4	5
5	MF	(Czech Republic)	7	Tomáš Hořava	2	0	0	2	4
6	DF	(Czech Republic)	2	Lukáš Hejda	2	0	0	1	3
6	MF	(Czech Republic)	11	Milan Petržela	1	0	0	2	3
8	MF	(Slovakia)	17	Patrik Hrošovský	2	0	0	0	2
8	MF	(Czech Republic)	6	Václav Pilař	1	1	0	0	2
8	FW	(Czech Republic)	37	Jakub Řezníček	0	2	0	0	2
11	DF	(Czech Republic)	14	Radim Řezník	1	0	0	0	1
11	DF	(Czech Republic)	8	David Limberský	1	0	0	0	1
11	DF	(Czech Republic)	21	Tomáš Hájek	1	0	0	0	1
11	DF	(Czech Republic)	24	Milan Havel	1	0	0	0	1
11	DF	(Czech Republic)	4	Roman Hubník	0	1	0	0	1
11	MF	(Czech Republic)	25	Aleš Čermák	0	0	0	1	1
Total					34	6	3	16	59

=== Disciplinary record ===
As of match played 2 December 2017

Number	Nation	Position	Name	Czech First League		Czech Cup		UEFA Champions League		UEFA Europa League		Total	
Number	Nation	Position	Name	Yellow card	Red card	Yellow card	Red card	Yellow card	Red card	Yellow card	Red card	Yellow card	Red card
2	(Czech Republic)	DF	Lukáš Hejda	1	0	0	0	0	0	0	0	1	0
4	(Czech Republic)	DF	Roman Hubník	2	0	0	0	0	0	0	0	2	0
7	(Czech Republic)	MF	Tomáš Hořava	1	0	0	0	0	0	0	0	1	0
8	(Czech Republic)	DF	David Limberský	4	0	0	0	0	0	3	0	7	0
9	(Czech Republic)	MF	Martin Zeman	2	0	0	0	0	0	2	0	4	0
10	(Czech Republic)	MF	Jan Kopic	2	0	0	0	1	0	0	0	3	0
11	(Czech Republic)	MF	Milan Petržela	2	0	0	0	2	0	2	0	6	0
13	(Czech Republic)	GK	Petr Bolek	0	0	0	0	1	0	0	0	1	0
14	(Czech Republic)	DF	Radim Řezník	2	0	0	0	1	0	0	0	3	0
15	(Czech Republic)	FW	Michal Krmenčík	1	0	0	0	2	1	1	0	4	1
16	(Czech Republic)	GK	Aleš Hruška	1	0	0	0	0	0	2	0	3	0
17	(Czech Republic)	MF	Patrik Hrošovský	2	0	0	0	1	0	2	0	5	0
18	(Czech Republic)	DF	Tomáš Hájek	0	0	0	0	1	0	0	0	1	0
21	(Czech Republic)	DF	Tomáš Hájek	4	0	0	0	0	0	0	0	4	0
23	(Czech Republic)	FW	Marek Bakoš	1	0	0	0	1	0	4	0	6	0
24	(Czech Republic)	DF	Milan Havel	2	0	0	0	2	0	1	0	5	0
25	(Czech Republic)	MF	Aleš Čermák	1	0	1	0	0	0	1	0	3	0
26	(Czech Republic)	MF	Daniel Kolář	3	0	0	0	0	0	1	0	4	0
29	(Croatia)	MF	Diego Živulić	1	0	0	0	1	0	0	0	2	0
37	(Czech Republic)	FW	Jakub Řezníček	0	0	1	0	0	0	0	0	1	0
Total				32	0	2	0	13	1	19	0	66	1
