= 2019–20 FC Viktoria Plzeň season =

Viktoria Plzeň
2019–20 season
- President: Adolf Šádek
- Head coach: Adrián Guľa
- Stadium: Doosan Arena
- Czech First League: 2nd
- Czech Cup: Semi-finals
- UEFA Champions League: Second qualifying round
- Top goalscorer: League: Michael Krmenčík (10); All: Michael Krmenčík (15)
- Highest home attendance: 11,625 (vs. Slavia Prague) (27 October 2019)
- Lowest home attendance: 0 (vs. Sparta Prague) (27 May 2020)
- Average home league attendance: 5,812
Home colours	Away colours	Third colours

The 2019–20 season was FC Viktoria Plzeň's 27th season in the Czech First League. The team competed in the Czech First League, the Czech Cup, and the UEFA Champions League.

== First team squad ==
As of 6 May 2020.

Note: Flags indicate national team as defined under FIFA eligibility rules; some limited exceptions apply. Players may hold more than one non-FIFA nationality.

No.	Pos.	Nation	Player
2	DF	(Czech Republic) CZE	Lukáš Hejda
3	DF	(Czech Republic) CZE	Adam Hloušek
4	DF	(Czech Republic) CZE	Roman Hubník (captain)
5	MF	(Democratic Republic of the Congo) COD	Joel Ngandu Kayamba
6	MF	(Argentina) ARG	Iván Díaz (on loan from Žilina)
7	MF	(Czech Republic) CZE	Tomáš Hořava
8	DF	(Czech Republic) CZE	David Limberský
9	FW	(France) FRA	Jean-David Beauguel
10	MF	(Czech Republic) CZE	Jan Kopic
11	DF	(Czech Republic) CZE	Matěj Hybš
14	DF	(Czech Republic) CZE	Radim Řezník
16	GK	(Czech Republic) CZE	Aleš Hruška
18	FW	(Czech Republic) CZE	Tomáš Chorý
19	MF	(Czech Republic) CZE	Jan Kovařík
20	MF	(Czech Republic) CZE	Pavel Bucha

No.	Pos.	Nation	Player
22	DF	(Czech Republic) CZE	Jakub Brabec
23	MF	(Czech Republic) CZE	Lukáš Kalvach
24	DF	(Czech Republic) CZE	Milan Havel
25	MF	(Czech Republic) CZE	Aleš Čermák
26	MF	(Slovakia) SVK	Christián Herc (on loan from Wolverhampton)
28	DF	(Slovakia) SVK	Marián Čišovský
29	GK	(Czech Republic) CZE	Dominik Sváček
36	GK	(Czech Republic) CZE	Jindřich Staněk
37	MF	(Czech Republic) CZE	Ondřej Mihálik (on loan from AZ Alkmaar)
44	DF	(Czech Republic) CZE	Luděk Pernica
50	DF	(Czech Republic) CZE	Šimon Gabriel
77	MF	(Croatia) CRO	Marko Alvir
90	MF	(Nigeria) NGA	Ubong Ekpai
—	MF	(Slovakia) SVK	Miroslav Káčer
—	DF	(Czech Republic) CZE	Filip Kaša

Note: Flags indicate national team as defined under FIFA eligibility rules; some limited exceptions apply. Players may hold more than one non-FIFA nationality.

No.	Pos.	Nation	Player
—	GK	(Czech Republic) CZE	Jakub Šiman (at Baník Sokolov)
—	DF	(Czech Republic) CZE	Filip Čihák (at FK Pardubice)
—	MF	(Czech Republic) CZE	Michal Hlavatý (at FK Pardubice)
—	MF	(Czech Republic) CZE	Lukáš Pfeifer (at FK Pardubice)
—	MF	(Czech Republic) CZE	Jan Suchan (at MFK Vítkovice)

No.	Pos.	Nation	Player
—	MF	(Czech Republic) CZE	Pavel Šulc (at SFC Opava)
—	MF	(Czech Republic) CZE	Ondřej Štursa (at Baník Sokolov)
—	FW	(Czech Republic) CZE	Lukáš Matějka (at FK Ústí nad Labem)
—	FW	(Slovakia) SVK	Erik Pačinda (at Korona Kielce)

== Transfers ==
=== In ===
Date	Pos.	Player	Age	Moving from	Fee
1 July 2019	DF	(Czech Republic) Jakub Brabec	26	(Belgium) K.R.C. Genk	Undisclosed
1 July 2019	DF	(Czech Republic) Adam Hloušek	30	(Poland) Legia Warsaw	Free Transfer
1 July 2019	MF	(Czech Republic) Lukáš Kalvach	23	(Czech Republic) SK Sigma Olomouc	€600

=== Out ===
Date	Pos.	Player	Age	Moving to	Fee
30 January 2020	FW	(Czech Republic) Michael Krmenčík	26	(Belgium) Club Brugge KV	€6,500,000

=== Loan in ===
Pos.	Player	Team	Date from	Until	Fee
GK	(Czech Republic) Jakub Šiman	(Czech Republic) FK Baník Sokolov	16 February 2020	1 July 2020	Loan

== Pre-season and friendlies ==
15 June 2019 Friendly	Viktoria Plzeň	5–2	Jiskra Domažlice	Plzeň
10:30 CEST (UTC+2)	Pernica 8'; Beaguel 19'; Krmenčík 25'; Petržela 48'; Kayamba 75' (pen.)	Report	Došlý 71', 77'	Stadium: Doosan Arena; Attendance: 450

19 June 2019 Friendly	Viktoria Plzeň	2–0	Baník Sokolov	Plzeň
16:30 CEST (UTC+2)	Beaguel 61'; Cermak 81'	Report		Stadium: Doosan Arena; Attendance: 210

22 June 2019 Friendly	Liptovský Mikuláš (Slovakia)	1–4	(Czech Republic) Viktoria Plzeň	Liptovský Mikuláš, Slovakia
17:00 CEST (UTC+2)	Andrić 19'	Report	Chorý 53'; Pačinda 62'; Janošek 64'; Čermák 69'	Stadium: Štadión Okoličné; Attendance: 1,850

28 June 2019 Friendly	Universitatea Craiova (Romania)	1–3	(Czech Republic) Viktoria Plzeň	Westendorf, Austria
11:30 CEST (UTC+2)	Roman 69'	Report	Řezník 7'; Kopic 20'; Chorý 74'	Stadium: SV Westendorf; Attendance: 40

28 June 2019 Friendly	Legia Warsaw (Poland)	3–0	(Czech Republic) Viktoria Plzeň	Westendorf, Austria
16:30 CEST (UTC+2)	Nagy 36'; Agra 64'; Niezgoda 73'	Report		Stadium: SV Westendorf; Attendance: 65

2 July 2019 Friendly	Qarabağ (Azerbaijan)	2–2	(Czech Republic) Viktoria Plzeň	Kössen, Austria
17:00 CEST (UTC+2)	Emreli 42', 49'	Report	Mihálik 83'; Janošek 85'	Attendance: 70

5 July 2019 Friendly	Ufa (Russia)	0–1	(Czech Republic) Viktoria Plzeň	Jenbach, Austria
15:00 CEST (UTC+2)		Report	Hejda 56'	Attendance: 70

18 January 2020 Friendly	Viktoria Plzeň	4–1	Ústi nad Labem	Luční
15:30 CET (UTC+1)	Čermak 30'; Kayamba 41'; Mihálik 43'; Alvir 88'	Report	Bassey 62'	Attendance: 900; Referee: Pavel Královec

23 January 2020 Friendly	Viktoria Plzeň	0–0	Viktoria Žižkov	Luční
15:30 CET (UTC+1)	Šimon (yellow card) 82'	Report		Attendance: 260; Referee: Jiri Houdek

20 May 2020 Friendly	Dynamo České Budějovice	1–4	Viktoria Plzeň	České Budějovice
16:00 CEST (UTC+2)	Mészáros 11'	Report	Beauguel 22'; Kovařík 25'; Kopic 58'; Bucha 67'	Stadium: Stadion Střelecký ostrov Attendance: 0 Referee: Pavel Franěk

== Competitions ==
=== Czech First League ===
==== Regular season ====
===== League table =====
Pos	Team	Pld	W	D	L	GF	GA	GD	Pts	Qualification or relegation
1	Slavia Prague	30	22	6	2	58	10	+48	72	Qualification for the championship group
2	Viktoria Plzeň	30	20	6	4	60	22	+38	66	Qualification for the championship group
3	Sparta Prague	30	14	8	8	55	35	+20	50	Qualification for the championship group
4	Jablonec	30	14	7	9	46	41	+5	49	Qualification for the championship group
5	Slovan Liberec	30	14	5	11	50	38	+12	47	Qualification for the championship group

Source: Fortuna Liga
Rules for classification: 1) Points; 2) Head-to-head points; 3) Head-to-head goal difference; 4) Head-to-head goals scored; 5) Goal difference; 6) Goals scored; 7) Fair-play ranking; 8) Draw.

===== Results summary =====
Overall								Home						Away					
Pld	W	D	L	GF	GA	GD	Pts	W	D	L	GF	GA	GD	W	D	L	GF	GA	GD
30	20	6	4	61	22	+39	66	12	1	2	39	11	+28	8	5	2	22	11	+11

Source: See results

===== Results by round =====
Round	1	2	3	4	5	6	7	8	9	10	11	12	13	14	15	16	17	18	19	20	21	22	23	24	25	26	27	28	29	30
Ground	H	A	H	A	H	A	H	A	H	A	H	A	H	H	A	H	A	H	A	H	A	H	A	H	A	H	A	A	H	A
Result	W	W	W	D	L	D	W	W	W	W	W	L	W	L	D	W	D	W	L	D	W	W	W	W	W	W	W	D	W	W
Position	1	2	2	2	3	4	2	2	2	2	2	2	2	2	2	2	2	2	2	2	2	2	2	2	2	2	2	2	2	2

Source: See results
A = Away; H = Home; W = Win; D = Draw; L = Loss

===== Matches =====
13 July 2019 1	Viktoria Plzeň	3–1	Sigma Olomouc	Plzeň
19:30 CEST (UTC+2)	Kayamba 40'; Kopic (yellow card) 52' (goal) 72'; Kayamba (yellow card) 59'; Kovařík 90+4'	Report	Štěrba (yellow card) 12'; Plšek 12' (pen.); Greššák (yellow card) 39'; Falta (yellow card) 48'; Yunis (yellow card) 54' (yellow-red card) 70'; Vepřek (yellow card) 66'	Stadium: Doosan Arena; Attendance: 9,611; Referee: Ondrej Pechanec

19 July 2019 2	Slovan Liberec	1–2	Viktoria Plzeñ	Liberec
18:30 CEST (UTC+2)	Pešek (yellow card) 17'; Breite (yellow card) 75'; Musa 80'	Report	Kalvach (yellow card) 17'; Krmenčik (yellow card) 52'; Pernica 57'	Stadium: Stadion u Nisy; Attendance: 5,142; Referee: Pavel Franěk

27 July 2019 3	Viktoria Plzeň	3–2	Karviná	Plzeň
19:30 CEST (UTC+2)	Krmencik 8', 63'; Brabec 69'; Kopic (yellow card) 87'	Report	Galuska (yellow card) 31'; Rundić 52' (pen.); Bukata (yellow card) 65'; Petran 85'	Stadium: Doosan Arena; Attendance: 7,035; Referee: Ondřej Ginzel

3 August 2019 4	Bohemians	0–0	Viktoria Plzeň	Vršovice, Prague
19:30 CEST (UTC+2)	Keita (yellow card) 32'; Vanicek (yellow card) 90+3'	Report	Hejda (yellow card) 42'	Stadium: Ďolíček; Attendance: 6,031; Referee: Karel Hrubeš

11 August 2019 5	Viktoria Plzeň	0–2	Slovácko	Plzeň
16:30 CEST (UTC+2)	Procházka (yellow card) 48'	Report	Reinberk (yellow card) 24'; Sasinka 48'; Zajic 61'; Navratil (yellow card) 76'	Stadium: Doosan Arena; Attendance: 8,790; Referee: Pavel Julínek

18 August 2019 6	Teplice	1–1	Viktoria Plzeň	Teplice
19:00 CEST (UTC+2)	Kodeš (yellow card) 36'; Mares (yellow card) 81'; Hora 83'	Report	Kalvach 37'; Brabec (yellow card) 63'; Hlousek (yellow card) 71'; Krmencik (yellow card) 77'; Mihálik (yellow card) 82'	Stadium: Na Stínadlech; Attendance: 5,241; Referee: Ondřej Berka

25 August 2019 7	Viktoria Plzeň	4–0	Opava	Plzeň
16:30 CEST (UTC+2)	Čermák 14'; Kovařík 36'; Limberský 46'; Čermák (yellow card) 60'; Chorý 69'	Report	Juřena (yellow card) 18'; Helebrand (yellow card) 25'; Mondek (yellow card) 37'	Stadium: Doosan Arena; Attendance: 8,113; Referee: Miroslav Zelinka

31 August 2019 8	Příbram	1–2	Viktoria Plzeň	Příbram
19:30 CEST (UTC+2)	Alvir 34'; Zeman (yellow card) 44'; Soldát (yellow card) 70'; Rezek (yellow card) 75' (yellow-red card) 88'; Šimek (yellow card) 87'	Report	Hořava (yellow card) 6'; Krmencik 22'; Čermák (yellow card) 56'; Kalvach (yellow card) 59'; Řezník (yellow card) 73'; Jan Kopic 82'; Limbersky (yellow card) 90+2'; Hruška (yellow card) 90+3'	Stadium: Na Litavce; Attendance: 5,862; Referee: Pavel Franěk

16 September 2019 9	Viktoria Plzeň	3–2	Jablonec	Plzeň
18:00 CEST (UTC+2)	Kalvach 43'; Procházka 66' (pen.); Kopic 73'; Hejda (red card) 85'; Chorý (yellow card) 90+5'	Report	Matoušek (yellow card) 21' (goal) 26'; Sýkora (yellow card) 32'; Holík 58'; Doležal (yellow card) 60'; Hübschman 73'; Kratochvíl (yellow card) 90+3'	Stadium: Doosan Arena; Attendance: 9,386; Referee: Zbyněk Proske

21 September 2019 10	Dynamo České	0–3	Viktoria Plzeň	České Budějovice
19:00 CEST (UTC+2)	Havel (yellow card) 2'; Schranz (yellow card) 70'; Rabušic (yellow card) 80'	Report	Krmenčík 18'; Procházka 31'; Tomáš 90+3'	Stadium: Stadion Střelecký ostrov Attendance: 6,143; Referee: Ondřej Berka

29 September 2019 11	Viktoria Plzeň	1–0	Sparta Prague	Plzeň
18:00 CEST (UTC+2)	Krmenčík 46'; Brabec (yellow card) 82'; Chorý (yellow card) 86'	Report	Trávník (yellow card) 85'; Plavšić (yellow card) 89'; Graiciar (yellow card) 90+3'	Stadium: Doosan Arena; Attendance: 11,536; Referee: Ondřej Pechanej

6 October 2019 12	Mladá Boleslav	2–1	Viktoria Plzeň	Mladá Boleslav
15:30 CEST (UTC+2)	Matějovský (yellow card) 36'; Komlichenko (yellow card) 45'; Pudil (yellow card) 82'	Report	Kopic 29'; Krmenčík (yellow card) 47'; Kalvach (yellow card) 68'; Chorý (yellow card) 90+2'	Stadium: Lokotrans Aréna; Attendance: 4,215; Referee: Ondřej Lerch

20 October 2019 13	Viktoria Plzeň	3–0	Baník Ostrava	Plzeň
15:30 CEST (UTC+2)	Brabec (yellow card) 29'; Hejda 50'; Krmenčík 60'; Řezník (yellow card) 63'; Limberský (yellow card) 88'; Chorý 90+5'	Report	Kuzmanovič (yellow card) 52'	Stadium: Doosan Arena; Attendance: 10,088; Referee: Emanuel Marek

27 October 2019 14	Viktoria Plzeň	0–1	Slavia Prague	Plzeň
17:00 CEST (UTC+2)	Kayamba (yellow card) 2'; Procházka (yellow card) 16'; Limberský (yellow card) 45'; Chorý (yellow card) 74'	Report	Olayinka (yellow card) 15'; Hušbauer 45+5'; Ševčík (yellow card) 49'; Hovorka (yellow card) 59'; Frydrych (yellow card) 83'; Traoré (yellow card) 88'	Stadium: Doosan Arena; Attendance: 11,625; Referee: Pavel Franěk

4 November 2019 15	Fastav Zlín	1–1	Viktoria Plzeň	Zlín
18:00 CET (UTC+1)	Hnaníček (yellow card) 36' (yellow-red card) 90+3'; Jiráček (yellow card) 64'; Matejov (yellow card) 80'; Wágner (yellow card) 88'	Report	Brabec (yellow card) 59'; Krmenčík 72'	Stadium: Letná Stadion; Attendance: 3,742; Referee: Ondřej Pechanec

10 November 2019 16	Viktoria Plzeň	4–1	Slovan Liberec	Plzeň
14:30 CET (UTC+1)	Procházka 23'; Hubník (yellow card) 24'; Hořava 44'; Krmenčík 52'; Hejda (yellow card) 88'; Hloušek 90'	Report	Baluta 10' (yellow card) 29' (yellow-red card)	Stadium: Doosan Arena; Attendance: 7,463; Referee: Zbyněk Proske

24 November 2019 17	Karviná	1–1	Viktoria Plzeň	Karviná
17:00 CET (UTC+1)	Lingr 16'; Smrž (yellow card) 58'; Ndefe (yellow card) 86'	Report	Kayamba 54'; Kovařík (yellow card) 63'; Krmenčík 68'; Řezník (yellow card) 80'; Hejda (yellow card) 90+4'	Stadium: Městský; Attendance: 3,718; Referee: Miroslav Zelinka

1 December 2019 18	Viktoria Plzeň	1–0	Bohemians	Plzeň
14:30 CET (UTC+1)	Kalvach 32'; Chorý (yellow card) 90+3'	Report	Podaný (yellow card) 62'	Stadium: Doosan Arena; Attendance: 7,260; Referee: Pavel Julínek

7 December 2019 19	Slovácko	2–1	Viktoria Plzeň	Uherské Hradiště
17:00 CET (UTC+1)	Reinberk 6'; Divíšek (yellow card) 66'; Petržela (yellow card) 78'; Hellebrand 83'	Report	Krmenčík 43'; Čermák (yellow card) 58'; Kalvach (yellow card) 90'	Stadium: Městský stadion Attendance: 4,432; Referee: Pavel Franěk

15 December 2019 20	Viktoria Plzeň	1–1	Teplice	Plzeň
14:30 CET (UTC+1)	Pernica 11'; Kopic (yellow card) 29'; Procházka (yellow card) 48'; Chorý (yellow card) 70'	Report	Shejbal 24' (yellow card) 90+2'; Nazarov (yellow card) 37'; Mareš (yellow card) 79'; Řezníček (yellow card) 80'	Stadium: Doosan Arena; Attendance: 6,118; Referee: Pavel Rejžek

16 February 2020 21	Opava	0–3	Viktoria Plzeň	Opava
14:30 CET (UTC+1)	Dordič (yellow card) 85'	Report	Nazarov (yellow card) 37'; Beauguel 57', 63'; Mareš (yellow card) 79'; Řezníček (yellow card) 80'; Kopic 90+2'	Stadium: Městský stadion Opava; Attendance: 4,236; Referee: Emanuel Marek

22 February 2020 22	Viktoria Plzeň	4–0	Příbram	Plzeň
16:30 CET (UTC+1)	Kalvach 4'; Bucha 17', 62', 72' (pen.)	Report	Šimek 71'	Stadium: Doosan Arena; Attendance: 9,632; Referee: Petr Hocek

29 February 2020 23	Jablonec	1–2	Viktoria Plzeň	Jablonec nad Nisou
14:30 CEST (UTC+2)	Pleštil 46' (yellow card) 65'; Kubista (yellow card) 63'	Report	Čermák 23'; Kopic (yellow card) 32'; Beauguel 41' (yellow card) 53'; Havel (yellow card) 63'	Stadium: Stadion Střelnice; Attendance: 2,813; Referee: Pavel Rejžek

7 March 2020 24	Viktoria Plzeň	1–0	Dynamo České	Plzeň
17:00 CET (UTC+1)	Mihálik 89'; Kovařík (yellow card) 89'	Report	Novák (yellow card) 24'; Havelka (yellow card) 66'; Havel (yellow card) 84'	Stadium: Doosan Arena; Attendance: 8,301; Referee: Ondřej Pechanec

27 May 2020 25	Sparta Prague	1–2	Viktoria Plzeň	Prague
20:00 CEST (UTC+2)	Nhamoinesu (yellow card) 81'; Krejčí (yellow card) 83'; Karlsson 87'; Štetina (yellow card) 90+1'; Kozák (yellow card) 90+7'; Kanga (yellow card) 90+7'	Report	Kalvach (yellow card) 22' (goal) 26'; Limberský (yellow card) 38'; Řezník (yellow card) 49'; Beauguel 52'	Stadium: Stadion Letná; Attendance: 0 Referee: Ondřej Berka

30 May 2020 26	Viktoria Plzeň	7–1	Mladá Boleslav	Plzeň
18:00 CEST (UTC+2)	Čermák 8', 23', 52'; Beauguel 31'; Havel 44'; Chorý 56'; Mihálik 80'	Report	Klíma 84' (pen.)	Stadium: Doosan Arena; Attendance: 0 Referee: Pavel Orel

3 June 2020 27	Baník Ostrava	0–2	Viktoria Plzeň	Ostrava
18:00 CEST (UTC+2)	Pokorný (yellow card) 74'; Fleišman (yellow card) 90+4'	Report	Bucha 33' (pen.); Kovařík 79'	Stadium: Městský; Attendance: 0 Referee: Karel Hrubeš

7 June 2020 28	Slavia Prague	0–0	Viktoria Plzeň	Vršovice, Prague
19:00 CEST (UTC+2)	Provod (yellow card) 79'; Bořil (yellow card) 90+5'	Report	Hejda (yellow card) 27'; Řezník (yellow card) 60'; Kopic (yellow card) 84'; Chorý (yellow card) 90+1'	Stadium: Sinobo Stadium; Attendance: 150; Referee: Pavel Franěk

10 June 2020 29	Viktoria Plzeň	3–0	Fastav Zlin	Plzeň
18:00 CEST (UTC+2)	Kopic 25'; Beauguel 36'; Chorý (yellow card) 79'; Havel 89'	Report	Hlinka (yellow card) 28'; Bačo (yellow card) 80'	Stadium: Doosan Arena; Attendance: 160; Referee: Pavel Rejžek

14 June 2020 30	Sigma Olomouc	0–1	Viktoria Plzeň	Olomouc
17:00 CEST (UTC+2)	Kerbr (yellow card) 52'; Breite (yellow card) 90+2'	Report	Hořava 16'; Havel (yellow card) 57'; Mihálik (yellow card) 90+4'	Stadium: Andrův stadion Attendance: 328; Referee: Emanuel Marek

==== Championship group ====
===== League table =====
Pos	Team	Pld	W	D	L	GF	GA	GD	Pts	Qualification
1	Slavia Prague (C)	35	26	7	2	69	12	+57	85	Qualification for the Champions League play-off round
2	Viktoria Plzeň	35	23	7	5	68	24	+44	76	Qualification for the Champions League second qualifying round
3	Sparta Prague	35	17	9	9	66	40	+26	60	Qualification for the Europa League group stage
4	Jablonec	35	14	9	12	48	52	−4	51	Qualification for the Europa League second qualifying round
5	Slovan Liberec (O)	35	15	6	14	55	51	+4	51	Qualification for the Europa League play-offs final
6	Baník Ostrava	35	12	11	12	47	43	+4	47	

Rules for classification: 1) Total points; 2) Points earned in regular season; 3) Head-to-head points (regular season); 4) Head-to-head goal difference (regular season); 5) Head-to-head goals scored (regular season); 5) Goal difference (all matches); 6) Goals scored (all matches); 7) Fair-play ranking; 8) Draw.
(C) Champions; (O) Play-off winners

===== Results summary =====
Overall								Home						Away					
Pld	W	D	L	GF	GA	GD	Pts	W	D	L	GF	GA	GD	W	D	L	GF	GA	GD
5	3	1	1	8	2	+6	10	3	0	0	8	1	+7	0	1	1	0	1	−1

Source: See results

===== Results by round =====
Round	1	2	3	4	5
Ground	H	A	H	A	H
Result	W	L	W	D	W
Position	2	2	2	2	2

Source: See results
A = Away; H = Home; W = Win; D = Draw; L = Loss

===== Matches =====
21 June 2020 1	Viktoria Plzeň	2–0	Jablonec	Plzeň
19:00 CEST (UTC+2)	Chorý 19'; Čermák 71'; Beauguel (yellow card) 80'	Report	Kratochvíl (yellow card) 47'; Hämäläinen (yellow card) 69'	Stadium: Doosan Arena; Attendance: 2,472; Referee: Pavel Julínek

24 June 2020 2	Slavia Prague	1–0	Viktoria Plzeň	Vršovice, Prague
20:00 CEST (UTC+2)	Ševčík 69'	Report	Chorý (yellow card) 18'; Kalvach (yellow card) 31'; Hořava (yellow card) 90+3'	Stadium: Sinobo Stadium; Referee: Miroslav Zelinka

28 June 2020 3	Viktoria Plzeň	2–1	Sparta Prague	Plzeň
16:30 CEST (UTC+2)	Kayamba (yellow card) 34'; Chorý 56'; Mihálik 65'; Kopic (red card) 85'	Report	Drchal (yellow card) 40'; Vindheim (yellow card) 83'; Karlsson 88'	Stadium: Doosan Arena; Attendance: 2,925; Referee: Pavel Orel

5 July 2020 4	Baník Ostrava	0–0	Viktoria Plzeň	Ostrava
17:00 CEST (UTC+2)		Report	Kayamba (yellow card) 54'; Kovařík (yellow card) 60'	Stadium: Městský; Attendance: 3,853; Referee: Petr Ardeleánu

8 July 2020 5	Viktoria Plzeň	4–0	Slovan Liberec	Plzeň
18:00 CEST (UTC+2)	Čermák 12', 56' (pen.); Kovařík 34'; Mihálik 61'	Report		Stadium: Doosan Arena; Attendance: 2,925; Referee: Pavel Rejžek

=== Czech Cup ===
25 September 2019 Third round	Hlučín	1–3	Viktoria Plzeň	Hlučín
16:00 CEST (UTC+2)	Heinik 64'	Report	Chorý 20'; Procházka 29'; Janošek 51'	Stadium: Town Stadium Hlucin; Attendance: 1,002; Referee: Zbynek Proske

30 October 2019 Fourth round	Chlumec nad Cidlinou	3–4 (a.e.t.)	Viktoria Plzeň	Chlumec nad Cidlinou
14:00 CET (UTC+1)	Bastin 20', 49', (yellow card) 60'; Jarkovsky (yellow card) 36'; Cap (yellow card) 53'; Zahourek (yellow card) 70'; Trávníček (yellow card) 84'; Labík (yellow card) 86', (goal) 88'; Petr (yellow card) 119'	Report	Krmenčík 72', 73', 108'; Pernica 81'; Limberský (yellow card) 66'; Hubník (yellow card) 68'; Chorý (yellow card) 118'	Stadium: Town Stadium Chlumec; Attendance: 3,854; Referee: Ondřej Berka

4 March 2020 Quarter-finals	Viktoria Plzeň	4–2	Mladá Boleslav	Plzeň
17:30 CET (UTC+1)	Kopic 33'; Beauguel 39'; Kayamba (yellow card) 45'; Řezník 49'; Řezník (yellow card) 68'; Chorý (penalty missed)	Report	Budínský 77', 85'; Tatayev (yellow card) 79'; Budínský (yellow card) 90+2'	Stadium: Doosan Arena; Attendance: 4,519; Referee: Pavel Orel

17 June 2020 Semi-finals	Sparta Prague	2–1	Viktoria Plzeň	Prague
20:15 CEST (UTC+2)	Kanga 15' (pen.), (yellow card) 59'; Kozák 28'; Štetina (yellow card) 81'; Krejčí (yellow card) 81'	Report	Bucha (yellow card) 9'; Limberský (yellow card) 14'; Havel (yellow card) 80', (goal) 90'; Chorý (yellow card) 81'	Stadium: Stadion Letná; Attendance: 1,951; Referee: Ondřej Pechanec

=== UEFA Champions League ===
==== Qualifying rounds ====
===== Second qualifying round =====
24 July 2019 First leg	Viktoria Plzeň (Czech Republic)	0–0	(Greece) Olympiacos	Plzeň, Czech Republic
19:00 CEST (UTC+2)	Havel (yellow card) 74'	Report	Semedo (yellow card) 34'	Stadium: Doosan Arena; Attendance: 10,632; Referee: Marco Guida

31 July 2019 Second leg	Olympiacos (Greece)	4–0 (4–0 agg.)	(Czech Republic) Viktoria Plzeň	Piraeus, Greece
21:00 EEST (UTC+3)	Guilherme 51'; Tsimikas (yellow card) 56'; Guerrero 70'; Řezník 73' (o.g.); Semedo 82'	Report	Brabec (yellow card) 53'; Chorý (yellow card) 90+1'	Stadium: Karaiskakis Stadium; Attendance: 30,123; Referee: Juan Martínez Munuera

=== UEFA Europa League ===
==== Third qualifying round ====
8 August 2019 First leg	Royal Antwerp (Belgium)	1–0	(Czech Republic) Viktoria Plzeň	Antwerp, Belgium
19:00 CEST (UTC+2)	Seck (yellow card) 10'; Rodrigues 29'	Report	Hrošovský (yellow card) 32'; Limberský (yellow card) 72'	Stadium: King Baudouin Stadium; Attendance: 15,734; Referee: Jens Maae

15 August 2019 Second leg	Viktoria Plzeň (Czech Republic)	2–1 (2–2 agg.)	(Belgium) Royal Antwerp	Plzeň, Czech Republic
20:00 CEST (UTC+2)	Krmenčík 81', 97'; Mihálik (yellow card) 109'; Hrošovský (yellow card) 117'	Report	Juklerød (yellow card) 18'; Haroun (yellow card) 57'; Bolat (yellow card) 82'; Seck (yellow card) 101' (red card) 101'; Mbokani 113'; Lamkel Zé (yellow card) 117'	Stadium: Doosan Arena; Attendance: 9,717; Referee: Davide Massa

== Squad statistics ==
As of match played 13 August 2020

=== Appearances and goals ===
No.	Nat.	Player	Czech First League		MOL Cup		Champions League		Europa League		TOTAL	
No.	Nat.	Player	Apps	Goals	Apps	Goals	Apps	Goals	Apps	Goals	Apps	Goals
Goalkeeper
16	(Czech Republic)	Aleš Hruška	34	0	2	0	2	0	2	0	39	0
–	(Czech Republic)	Jakub Šiman	0	0	0	0	0	0	0	0	0	0
29	(Czech Republic)	Dominik Sváček	0	0	0	0	0	0	0	0	0	0
Defender
2	(Czech Republic)	Lukáš Hejda	27(1)	1	2	0	1	0	2	0	32(1)	1
3	(Czech Republic)	Adam Hloušek	13(5)	1	2	0	1	0	0(1)	0	16(6)	1
8	(Czech Republic)	David Limberský	20	1	2(1)	0	0	0	2	0	24(1)	1
11	(Czech Republic)	Matěj Hybš	0	0	0	0	0	0	0	0	0	0
14	(Czech Republic)	Radim Řezník	28(3)	0	2	1	1	0	1(1)	0	32(4)	1
22	(Czech Republic)	Jakub Brabec	32	1	2	0	2	0	2	0	38	1
24	(Czech Republic)	Milan Havel	8(3)	2	1	0	1	0	1	0	11(3)	2
44	(Czech Republic)	Luděk Pernica	10(7)	2	3	1	2	0	0	0	15(7)	3
50	(Czech Republic)	Šimon Gabriel	0	0	0	0	0	0	0	0	0	0
–	(Czech Republic)	Filip Kaša	0	0	0	0	0	0	0	0	0	0
Midfielder
5	(Democratic Republic of the Congo)	Joel Ngandu Kayamba	23(3)	1	4	0	2	0	1(1)	0	30(4)	1
6	(Argentina)	Iván Díaz	0(1)	0	0	0	0	0	0	0	0(1)	0
7	(Czech Republic)	Tomáš Hořava	19(7)	2	1(1)	0	0	0	1(1)	0	21(8)	2
10	(Czech Republic)	Jan Kopic	25(7)	2	1(1)	0	0	0	1(1)	0	21(8)	2
19	(Czech Republic)	Jan Kovařík	21(7)	7	3	1	2	0	2	0	28(7)	8
20	(Czech Republic)	Pavel Bucha	12(2)	4	2	0	0	0	0	0	14(2)	4
23	(Czech Republic)	Lukáš Kalvach	33	5	2(1)	0	2	0	2	0	35(1)	5
25	(Czech Republic)	Aleš Čermák	20	8	2	0	1	0	0	0	29	10
26	(Slovakia)	Christián Herc	0(1)	1(1)	0	0	0	0	0	0	1(2)	0
29	(Czech Republic)	Dominik Sváček	0	0	0	0	0	0	0	0	0	0
36	(Czech Republic)	Jindřich Staněk	0	0	1	0	0	0	0	0	1	0
37	(Czech Republic)	Ondřej Mihálik	3(15)	4	3(2)	0	1(1)	0	0(1)	0	7(19)	4
77	(Croatia)	Marko Alvir	0(2)	0	0(2)	0	0	0	0	0	0(4)	0
90	(Nigeria)	Ubong Ekpai	0	0	0	0	0	0	0	0	0	0
–	(Slovakia)	Miroslav Káčer	0	0	0	0	0	0	0	0	0	0
Forward
9	(France)	Jean-David Beauguel	10(8)	6	3(1)	1	0	0	0	0	13(9)	7
18	(Czech Republic)	Tomáš Chorý	6(26)	6	1(3)	1	0	0	0	0	7(29)	7
