= Milan Havel =

Czech footballer

Personal information
- Date of birth: 7 August 1994 (age 32)
- Place of birth: Benešov, Czech Republic
- Height: 1.83 m (6 ft 0 in)
- Position: Left back

Team information
- Current team: Bohemians 1905
- Number: 24

Youth career
- Bohemians 1905

Senior career*
Years	Team	Apps	(Gls)
2012–2017	Bohemians 1905	55	(2)
2017–2026	Viktoria Plzeň	177	(17)
2019	→ Bohemians 1905 (loan)	11	(3)
2026–	Bohemians 1905	13	(0)

International career^{‡}
2014	Czech Republic U20	1	(0)
2015–2017	Czech Republic U21	15	(1)
2021–	Czech Republic	5	(0)
- * Club domestic league appearances and goals as of 27 May 2026 ‡ National team caps and goals as of 25 May 2023

Milan Havel (born 7 August 1994) is a Czech professional footballer who plays as a midfielder for Bohemians 1905 and the Czech Republic national team.

On 24 August 2021, Havel received his first call-up by coach Jaroslav Šilhavý for the 2022 FIFA World Cup qualification against Belarus and Belgium, as well as Ukraine. He debuted in the latter match on 8 September 2021 that ended in a 1–1 draw.

== Career statistics ==
As of 25 June 2023

Appearances and goals by club, season and competition
Club	Season	League			Cup		Continental		Other		Total	
Club	Season	Division	Apps	Goals	Apps	Goals	Apps	Goals	Apps	Goals	Apps	Goals
Bohemians 1905	2012–13	Czech National Football League	3	0	—		—		—		3	0
Bohemians 1905	2013–14	Czech First League	0	0	0	0	—		—		0	0
Bohemians 1905	2014–15	Czech First League	4	0	1	0	—		—		5	0
Bohemians 1905	2015–16	Czech First League	20	1	2	0	—		—		22	1
Bohemians 1905	2016–17	Czech First League	28	2	2	0	—		—		30	2
Bohemians 1905	Total		55	2	5	0	—		—		60	3
Viktoria Plzeň	2017–18	Czech First League	16	1	2	0	5	0	—		23	1
Viktoria Plzeň	2018–19	Czech First League	13	1	2	0	6	0	—		21	1
Viktoria Plzeň	2019–20	Czech First League	12	2	1	1	2	0	—		15	3
Viktoria Plzeň	2020–21	Czech First League	26	2	5	1	3	0	—		34	3
Viktoria Plzeň	2021–22	Czech First League	31	5	2	1	3	1	—		36	7
Viktoria Plzeň	2022–23	Czech First League	29	3	0	0	12	0	—		41	3
Viktoria Plzeň	Total		127	14	12	3	31	1	0	0	170	18
Bohemians 1905 (loan)	2019–20	Czech First League	11	3	1	0	—		—		12	3
Career total			193	20	18	3	31	1	0	0	242	24

== Honours ==
Bohemians 1905

Runner-up

- Czech National Football League: 2012–13
