= Kozolupy (Plzeň-North District) =

- Municipality
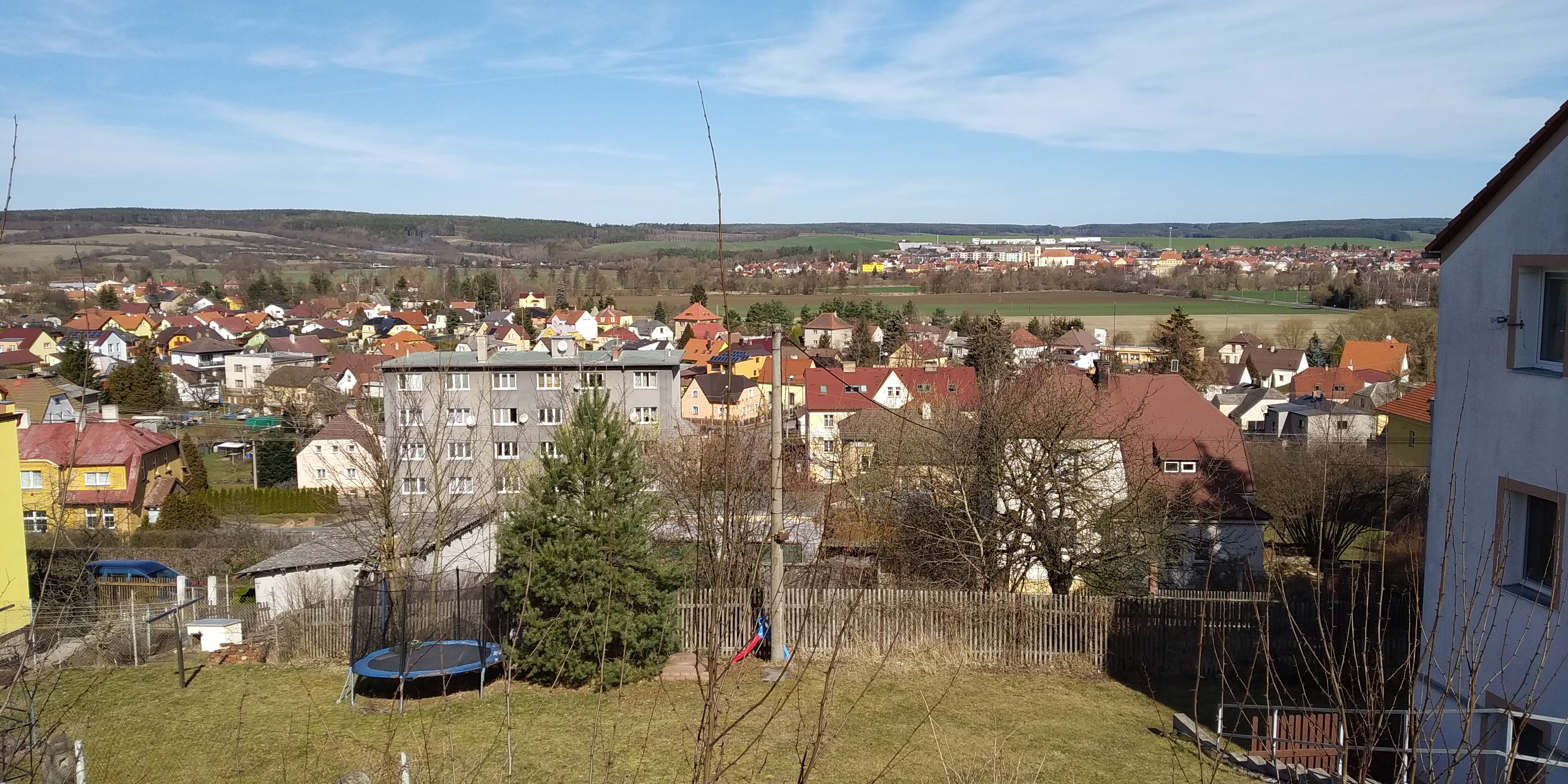
- General view

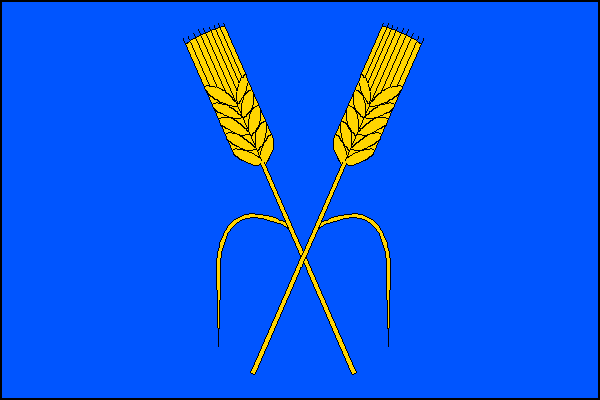
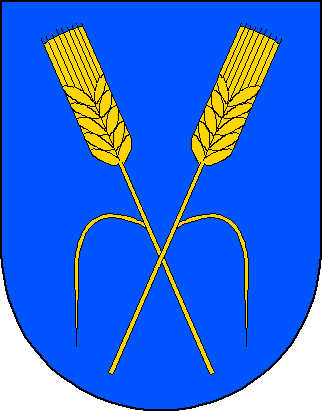
- Flag Coat of arms

- Location in the Czech Republic
- Coordinates: 49°45′40″N 13°14′51″E
- Country: Czech Republic
- Region: Plzeň
- District: Plzeň-North
- First mentioned: 1186

Area
  - Total: 5.51 km^{2} (2.13 sq mi)
- Elevation: 350 m (1,150 ft)

Population (2026-01-01)
  - Total: 1,075
  - Density: 195/km^{2} (505/sq mi)
- Time zone: UTC+1 (CET)
  - Summer (DST): UTC+2 (CEST)
- Postal code: 330 32
- Website: www.obec-kozolupy.cz

Kozolupy is a municipality and village in Plzeň-North District in the Plzeň Region of the Czech Republic. It has about 1,100 inhabitants.

Kozolupy lies approximately 10 kilometres (6 mi) west of Plzeň and 92 km (57 mi) south-west of Prague.

== Demographics ==
Historical population
Year	Pop.	±%
1869	767	—
1880	628	−18.1%
1890	652	+3.8%
1900	651	−0.2%
1910	958	+47.2%
1921	947	−1.1%
1930	1,261	+33.2%
1950	1,128	−10.5%
1961	1,133	+0.4%
1970	1,032	−8.9%
1980	988	−4.3%
1991	932	−5.7%
2001	902	−3.2%
2011	974	+8.0%
2021	1,043	+7.1%
Source: Censuses
