= Jakub Šašinka =

Czech footballer

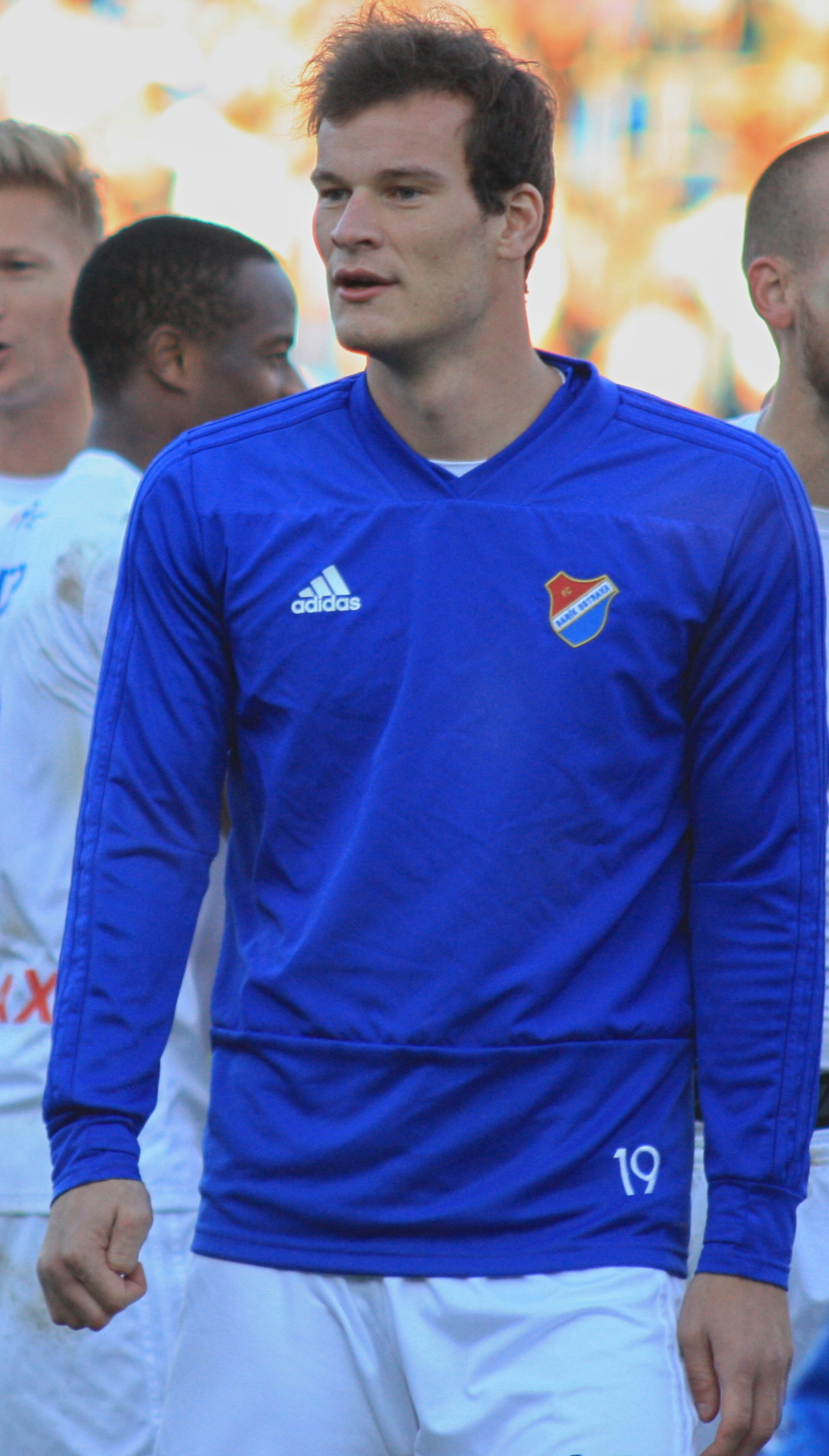
- Jakub Šašinka in 2018

Personal information
- Full name: Jakub Šašinka
- Date of birth: 2 October 1995 (age 31)
- Place of birth: Czech Republic
- Height: 1.91 m (6 ft 3 in)
- Position: Forward

Team information
- Current team: Silon Táborsko

Youth career
- Ostrava

Senior career*
Years	Team	Apps	(Gls)
2014–2021	Baník Ostrava	51	(3)
2017	→ Poprad (loan)	11	(7)
2018	→ Poprad (loan)	10	(0)
2019	→ Karviná (loan)	6	(0)
2020	→ Příbram (loan)	2	(0)
2020–2021	→ Blansko (loan)	9	(1)
2021–2022	Kozani	0	(0)
2022	Al Dhaid		
2023–	Silon Táborsko	38	(6)

International career
2011	Czech Republic U-16	2	(0)
2013	Czech Republic U-18	5	(0)
2013	Czech Republic U-19	2	(1)
2015-216	Czech Republic U-20		
- * Club domestic league appearances and goals as of 25 June 2024

Jakub Šašinka (born 2 October 1995) is a Czech footballer who plays for Silon Táborsko. His younger brother Ondřej is also a football player.

== Career ==
=== FC Baník Ostrava ===
Šašinka made his professional debut for FC Baník Ostrava against Mladá Boleslav on 13 September 2014.
