= Petr Bolek =

Czech footballer

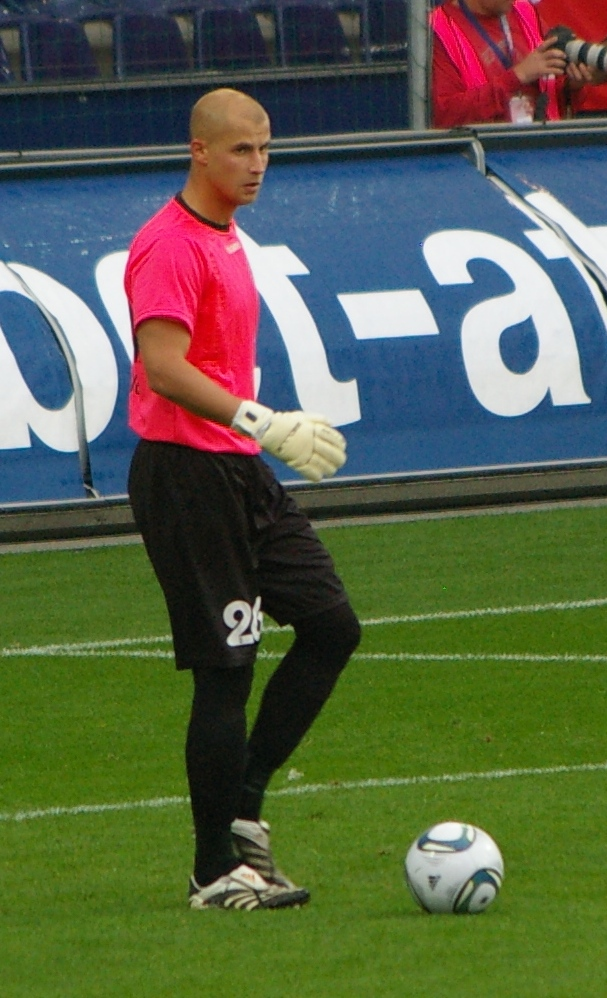

Personal information
- Full name: Petr Bolek
- Date of birth: 13 June 1984 (age 42)
- Place of birth: Ostrava, Czechoslovakia
- Height: 1.90 m (6 ft 3 in)
- Position: Goalkeeper

Team information
- Current team: TJ Tatran Třemošná

Youth career
- Baník Ostrava

Senior career*
| Years | Team | Apps | (Gls) |
| 2002–2003 | Baník Ostrava | 0 | (0) |
| 2003–2009 | Slovan Liberec | 0 | (0) |
| 2006 | → Hlučín (loan) | 12 | (0) |
| 2007–2008 | → 1. FC Slovácko (loan) | 18 | (0) |
| 2008–2009 | → ViOn Zlaté Moravce (loan) | 33 | (0) |
| 2009 | Kasımpaşa | 0 | (0) |
| 2010–2012 | Senica | 70 | (0) |
| 2012–2018 | Viktoria Plzeň | 15 | (0) |
| 2017–2018 | → Baník Sokolov (loan) | 14 | (0) |
| 2018 | Dolní Benešov | 8 | (0) |
| 2019 | Spartak Trnava | 9 | (0) |
| 2020–2022 | Karviná | 22 | (0) |
| 2022 | → ŠKF Sereď (loan) | 0 | (0) |
| 2022– | TJ Tatran Třemošná | | |

International career
| 1999–2000 | Czech Republic U15 | 7 | (0) |
| 2000–2001 | Czech Republic U16 | 12 | (0) |
| 2001–2002 | Czech Republic U18 | 8 | (0) |
| 2002–2003 | Czech Republic U19 | 9 | (0) |
- * Club domestic league appearances and goals as of 30 July 2022

Petr Bolek (born 13 June 1984) is a Czech footballer who plays for TJ Tatran Třemošná as a goalkeeper.

== Club career ==
He was signed by Spartak Trnava in January 2019.

== Honours ==
Spartak Trnava

- Slovak Cup: 2018–19
