= Jiří Piroch =

Czech footballer

Personal information
- Date of birth: 31 August 1995 (age 31)
- Place of birth: Plzeň, Czech Republic
- Height: 1.87 m (6 ft 2 in)
- Position: Defender

Team information
- Current team: Odra Opole
- Number: 3

Youth career
- Viktoria Plzeň

Senior career*
Years	Team	Apps	(Gls)
2015–2019	Viktoria Plzeň	0	(0)
2015	→ Baník Most (loan)		
2016	→ Jiskra Domažlice (loan)		
2017	→ Pardubice (loan)	29	(4)
2018	→ Jablonec (loan)	3	(0)
2018	→ Karviná (loan)	4	(0)
2019	→ Pardubice (loan)	14	(0)
2019–2023	Dukla Prague	101	(6)
2023–	Odra Opole	66	(8)
- * Club domestic league appearances and goals as of 08:25, 27 May 2026 (UTC)

Jiří Piroch (born 31 August 1995) is a Czech professional footballer who plays as a defender for and captains Polish club Odra Opole.

Having started out at FC Viktoria Plzeň, Piroch didn't feature in the league for his team, and only played during six loan spells away from the club, including in the Czech First League for Jablonec and Karviná. He subsequently transferred to play in the Czech National Football League for Dukla Prague in 2019 for four years, before moving to Poland in 2023.

== Career ==
Growing up, Piroch played football and handball, before deciding to concentrate on football. He signed for FC Viktoria Plzeň and spent time on loan at lower-league clubs Baník Most and Jiskra Domažlice.

Piroch scored his first Czech Second League goal for Pardubice in a 3–0 win against Táborsko in the spring part of the 2016–17 season, and played a total of 29 league matches for the club during his loan spell.

Piroch made his Czech First League debut while on loan at FK Jablonec, as a substitute in a 2–0 win against Slovan Liberec in April 2018. After another loan in the First League, at Karviná, he went on loan for a second time to second-tier Pardubice in February 2019. From 2019 to 2023, Piroch played for Dukla Prague in the Czech National Football League, before moving to Poland to play for Odra Opole.

== Personal life ==
His father, also called Jiří, played handball at a professional level, making seven appearances for the Czech national team. His brother, Tomáš, is also a national team player. The family spent seven years in France during Piroch's childhood.
