= Marek Bakoš =

Slovak footballer (born 1983)

Personal information
- Date of birth: 15 April 1983 (age 43)
- Place of birth: Nová Baňa, Czechoslovakia
- Height: 1.86 m (6 ft 1 in)
- Position: Forward

Team information
- Current team: Viktoria Plzeň (assistant)

Youth career
- 1990–1998: Nová Baňa
- 1998–2002: Nitra

Senior career*
Years	Team	Apps	(Gls)
2002–2003	Nitra	1	(0)
2003–2005	Matador Púchov	72	(17)
2006	Shinnik Yaroslavl	22	(3)
2007–2009	Ružomberok	48	(16)
2009–2014	Viktoria Plzeň	124	(44)
2015–2016	Slovan Liberec	40	(13)
2016–2019	Viktoria Plzeň	53	(10)
2018	→ Spartak Trnava (loan)	9	(2)

International career
2005	Slovakia U21	9	(3)
2012–2016	Slovakia	14	(0)

Managerial career
- 2019–: Viktoria Plzeň (assistant)
- 2025–: Czech Republic U21 (assistant)
- 2025: Viktoria Plzeň (caretaker)
- * Club domestic league appearances and goals

Marek Bakoš (Slovak pronunciation: [ˈmareɡ ˈbakɔʂ], born 15 April 1983) is a former Slovak footballer. In his playing career, Bakoš played as a centre forward.

== Early life ==
Bakoš was born on April 15, 1983 in Nová Bána. Nová Bána was the first club he played for, starting at the age of 7. He spent 8 seasons with this team, after which, at the age of 15, he joined FC Nitra.

== Club career ==
On 13 September 2011, Bakoš scored the first UEFA Champions League group stage goal in Viktoria Plzeň's history in a 1–1 home draw against Belarusian club BATE Borisov. On 23 November 2011, he netted the only goal in the away match against BATE Borisov to enable his team to claim its first group stage win and almost assure its progression into the UEFA Europa League as the third best team in the group. He helped Slovan Liberec win the Czech Cup in 2014–15 and scored in the final.

== Managerial career ==
In September 2025, it was announced that Bakoš would be becoming the interim manager for his former club Viktoria Plzen.

== International career ==
Bakoš made his debut for the Slovak national football team on 29 February 2012 in a friendly match against Turkey, where he played the first half. He made his fifth start in the first qualifying match for the 2014 World Cup against Lithuania and played until the 79th minute, when he was replaced by Martin Jakubko. The match ended in a 1–1 draw, with Bakoš scoring a goal in regulation time in the first half, which was disallowed due to an offside.

== Career statistics ==
Season	Club	League		Cup		Continental		Total	
Season	Club	Apps	Goals	Apps	Goals	Apps	Goals	Apps	Goals
2003–04 Slovak Superliga	Matador Púchov	36	9	?	?	1	0	37	9
2004–05 Slovak Superliga	Matador Púchov	36	8	?	?	0	0	36	8
2006 Russian Premier League	Shinnik	2	0	?	?	-	-	2	0
Russian First Division 2007	Shinnik	20	3	?	?	-	-	20	3
2007–08 Slovak Superliga	Ružomberok	20	10	0	0	0	0	20	10
2008–09 Slovak Superliga	Ružomberok	28	6	0	0	0	0	28	6
2009–10 Czech First League	Viktoria Plzeň	24	7	0	0	0	0	24	7
2010–11 Czech First League	Viktoria Plzeň	25	9	0	0	0	0	25	9
2011–12 Czech First League	Viktoria Plzeň	28	16	0	0	13	8	41	24
2012–13 Czech First League	Viktoria Plzeň	28	10	0	0	12	4	40	14
2013–14 Czech First League	Viktoria Plzeň	14	1	?	?	9	1	23	2
2014–15 Czech First League	Viktoria Plzeň	5	1	?	?	2	0	7	1
2014–15 Czech First League	Slovan Liberec	12	1	?	?	-	-	12	1
2015–16 Czech First League	Slovan Liberec	28	12	?	?	10	2	38	14
Career Total		306	93	0	0	47	15	353	108

== International career ==
On 29 February 2012, Bakoš debuted for the senior national team of his country as a starter in the 2–1 away victory against Turkey in a friendly match.

== Honours ==
=== Club ===
==== Plzeň ====
- Czech First League (3): 2010–11, 2012–13, 2014–15
- Czech Cup (1): 2009–10
- Czech Republic Football Supercup (1): 2011

==== Liberec ====
- Czech Cup (1): 2014–15

=== International ===
- UEFA European Under-19 Football Championship: Third place (2002)
