= Radim Řezník =

Czech footballer

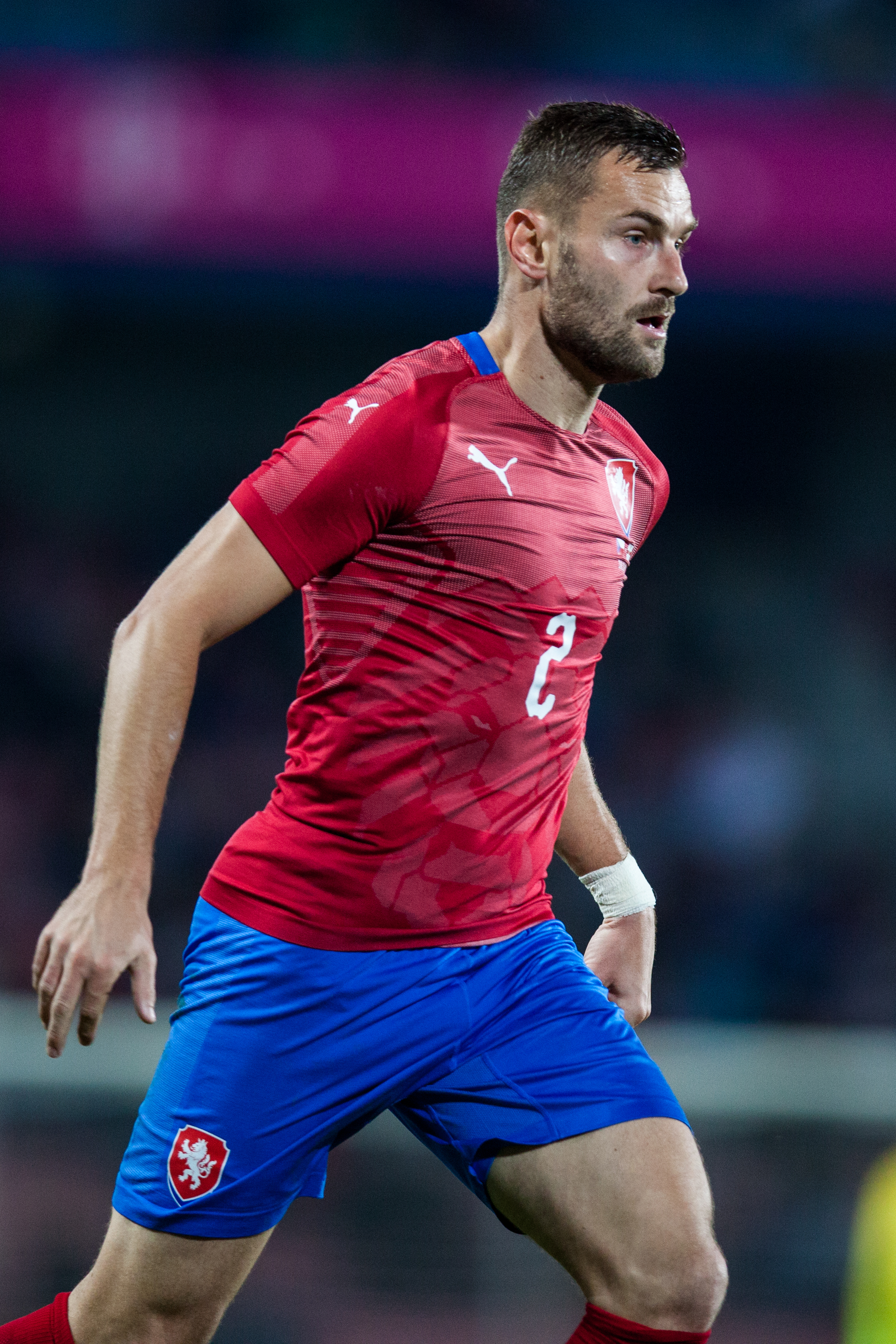
- Řezník with the Czech Republic in 2019

Personal information
- Date of birth: 20 January 1989 (age 37)
- Place of birth: Český Těšín, Czechoslovakia
- Height: 1.83 m (6 ft 0 in)
- Position: Right back

Team information
- Current team: Jiskra Domažlice
- Number: 14

Youth career
- FC Těrlicko
- 1996–2001: FC Karviná
- 2001–2006: Baník Ostrava

Senior career*
Years	Team	Apps	(Gls)
2007–2011	Baník Ostrava	97	(2)
2011–2024	Viktoria Plzeň	220	(11)
2021	→ Mladá Boleslav (loan)	8	(1)
2024–	Jiskra Domažlice	0	(0)

International career
2005–2006	Czech Republic U17	15	(1)
2006	Czech Republic U18	6	(0)
2007–2008	Czech Republic U19	10	(0)
2009	Czech Republic U20	4	(0)
2007–2011	Czech Republic U21	10	(0)
2014–2019	Czech Republic	3	(0)
- * Club domestic league appearances and goals as of 20 June 2024

Radim Řezník (born 20 January 1989) is a Czech footballer. He last played for FC Viktoria Plzeň. He has three caps for the Czech Republic national football team.

Řezník started his league career at FC Baník Ostrava, where he played until 2011, when he moved to FC Viktoria Plzeň. Having represented various Czech youth teams, on 4 September 2014, Řezník debuted for the senior squad in a friendly match against the United States.

On 20 September 2024, Řezník signed a contract with Bohemian Football League club Jiskra Domažlice.

== Career statistics ==
As of 30 December 2014

Season	Club	League		Cup		Continental		Total	
Season	Club	Apps	Goals	Apps	Goals	Apps	Goals	Apps	Goals
2006–07 Czech First League	FC Baník Ostrava	10	0	0	0	0	0	10	0
2007–08 Czech First League	FC Baník Ostrava	26	0	0	0	0	0	26	0
2008–09 Czech First League	FC Baník Ostrava	10	0	0	0	0	0	10	0
2009–10 Czech First League	FC Baník Ostrava	25	1	0	0	0	0	25	1
2010–11 Czech First League	FC Baník Ostrava	21	1	0	0	0	0	21	1
2011–12 Czech First League	FC Baník Ostrava	5	0	0	0	0	0	5	0
2011–12 Czech First League	Viktoria Plzeň	11	0	0	0	0	0	11	0
2012–13 Czech First League	Viktoria Plzeň	26	1	0	0	16	0	42	1
2013–14 Czech First League	Viktoria Plzeň	22	0	0	0	13	0	35	0
2014–15 Czech First League	Viktoria Plzeň	16	3	0	0	2	0	18	3
Career total		172	6	0	0	31	0	203	6

== Honours ==
=== Club ===
Viktoria Plzeň

- Czech First League: 2012–13
