= Tomáš Hořava =

Czech football player (born 1988)

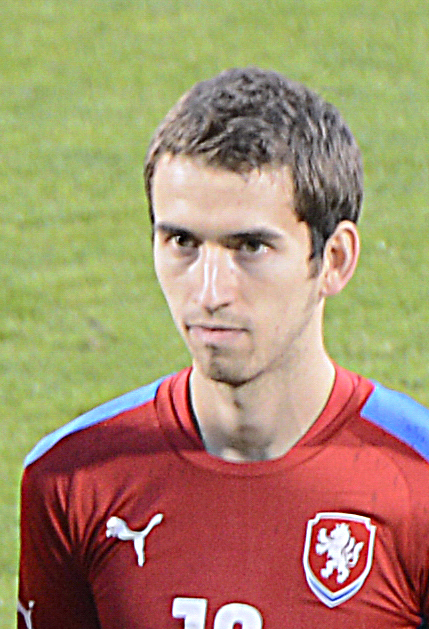

Personal information
- Full name: Tomáš Hořava
- Date of birth: 29 May 1988 (age 38)
- Place of birth: Brno, Czechoslovakia
- Height: 1.79 m (5 ft 10 in)
- Position: Midfielder

Youth career
- 1993–2002: Drnovice
- 2002: Brno
- 2003: Drnovice
- 2004–2006: Sigma Olomouc

Senior career*
Years	Team	Apps	(Gls)
2006–2013	Sigma Olomouc	132	(10)
2013–2021	Viktoria Plzeň	192	(31)

International career^{‡}
2008–2011	Czech Republic U21	17	(1)
2012–2018	Czech Republic	14	(3)
- * Club domestic league appearances and goals as of 31 January 2021 ‡ National team caps and goals as of 11 September 2018

Tomáš Hořava (born 29 May 1988) is a former Czech football player who last played for Viktoria Plzeň.

== Career ==
Hořava was a member of the Czech under-21 team, having represented them at the 2011 UEFA European Under-21 Football Championship. He debuted for the senior squad against Slovakia in November 2012.

=== International goals ===
Scores and results list Czech Republic's goal tally first.

#	Date	Venue	Opponent	Score	Result	Competition
1.	15 November 2013	Andrův stadion, Olomouc	Canada	2–0	2–0	Friendly
2.	3 June 2014	Andrův stadion, Olomouc	Austria	1–1	1–2	Friendly
3.	22 March 2017	Městský stadion, Ústí nad Labem	Lithuania	1–0	3–0	Friendly

== Career statistics ==
As 1 June 2015

Season	Club	League		Cup		Continental		Total	
Season	Club	Apps	Goals	Apps	Goals	Apps	Goals	Apps	Goals
2006–07 Czech First League	SK Sigma Olomouc	6	0	0	0	0	0	6	0
2007–08 Czech First League	SK Sigma Olomouc	8	0	0	0	0	0	8	0
2008–09 Czech First League	SK Sigma Olomouc	26	4	0	0	0	0	26	4
2009–10 Czech First League	SK Sigma Olomouc	22	2	0	0	0	0	22	2
2010–11 Czech First League	SK Sigma Olomouc	28	2	0	0	0	0	28	2
2011–12 Czech First League	SK Sigma Olomouc	15	2	0	0	0	0	15	2
2012–13 Czech First League	SK Sigma Olomouc	27	0	0	0	0	0	27	0
2013–14 Czech First League	FC Viktoria Plzeň	28	1	0	0	14	3	42	4
2014–15 Czech First League	FC Viktoria Plzeň	26	6	0	0	2	0	28	6
Career Total		186	17	0	0	16	3	202	20

== Honours ==
SK Sigma Olomouc

- Czech Supercup: 2012
