= Martin Zeman =

Czech footballer

Personal information
- Full name: Martin Zeman
- Date of birth: 28 March 1989 (age 37)
- Place of birth: Tábor, Czechoslovakia
- Height: 1.74 m (5 ft 8 1/2 in)
- Position: Forward

Team information
- Current team: Slovan Velvary

Youth career
- 1994–2001: Tábor
- 2001–2007: Sparta Prague

Senior career*
Years	Team	Apps	(Gls)
2007–2015	Sparta Prague	57	(4)
2011–2012	→ Admira Wacker (loan)	14	(0)
2012–2013	→ Viktoria Plzeň (loan)	6	(0)
2013	→ Senica (loan)	11	(1)
2014–2015	→ Příbram (loan)	37	(6)
2015–2016	Sion	29	(7)
2016–2019	Viktoria Plzeň	47	(0)
2019	Hapoel Ra'anana	10	(0)
2019	Příbram	18	(0)
2020	Slovan Liberec	13	(0)
2020–2022	Bruk-Bet Termalica	42	(3)
2022	Slavoj Mýto		
2022–2024	Přeštice	57	(13)
2024–	Slovan Velvary	28	(3)

International career
2004–2005	Czech Republic U16	10	(3)
2005–2006	Czech Republic U17	16	(3)
2006–2007	Czech Republic U18	3	(0)
2007–2008	Czech Republic U19	14	(0)
2009	Czech Republic U20	3	(0)
2008–2009	Czech Republic U21	5	(1)
Medal record
Men's football
Representing Czech Republic
UEFA European Under-17 Championship
Runner-up	2006 Luxembourg
- * Club domestic league appearances and goals as of 19:06, 20 June 2025 (UTC)

Martin Zeman (born 28 March 1989) is a Czech footballer who plays as a forward for Slovan Velvary. He was also a Czech U21 international.

== Honours ==
Sparta Prague

- Czech First League: 2009–10
- Czech Cup: 2007–08

Viktoria Plzeň

- Czech First League: 2012–13, 2017–18
