= Ondřej Bačo =

Czech footballer (born 1996)

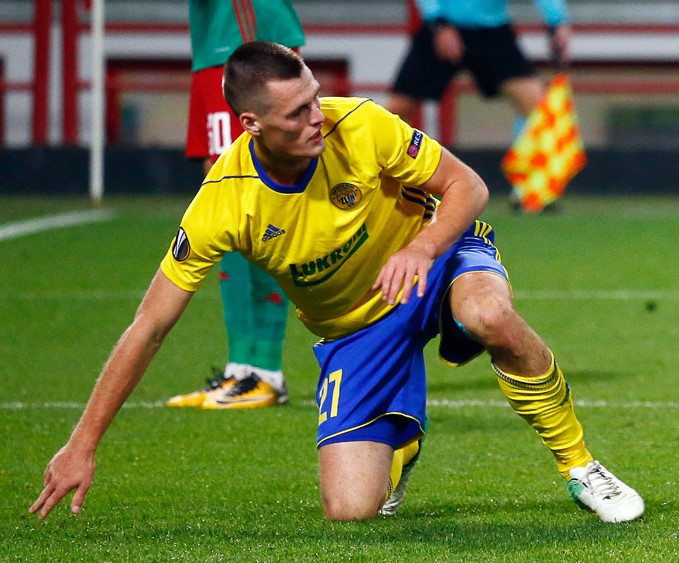

Personal information
- Date of birth: 25 March 1996 (age 30)
- Place of birth: Brumov-Bylnice, Czech
- Height: 1.87 m (6 ft 1 1/2 in)
- Position: Centre back

Team information
- Current team: Ironi Tiberias
- Number: 37

Youth career
- –2016: Fastav Zlín

Senior career*
| Years | Team | Apps | (Gls) |
| 2016–2020 | Fastav Zlín | 40 | (0) |
| 2019 | → Líšeň (loan) | 9 | (0) |
| 2020–2021 | Gaz Metan Mediaș | 32 | (2) |
| 2021–2024 | Hapoel Jerusalem | 68 | (5) |
| 2024 | Diósgyőr | 2 | (0) |
| 2024– | Ironi Tiberias | 55 | (3) |

International career
| 2017–2018 | Czech Republic U-21 | 4 | (2) |
- * Club domestic league appearances and goals as of 24 June 2026

Ondřej Bačo (born 25 March 1996) is a Czech footballer who plays for Israeli club Ironi Tiberias.

== Club career ==
Bačo made his Czech First League debut for Fastav Zlín on 18 November 2016 in a game against Vysočina Jihlava.

On 1 August 2021, Bačo signed for the Israeli Premier League club Hapoel Jerusalem.

On 14 January 2024, Bačo joined Diósgyőr in Hungary.

== Honours ==
Fastav Zlín

- Czech Cup: 2016–17
