= Aleš Hruška =

Czech footballer

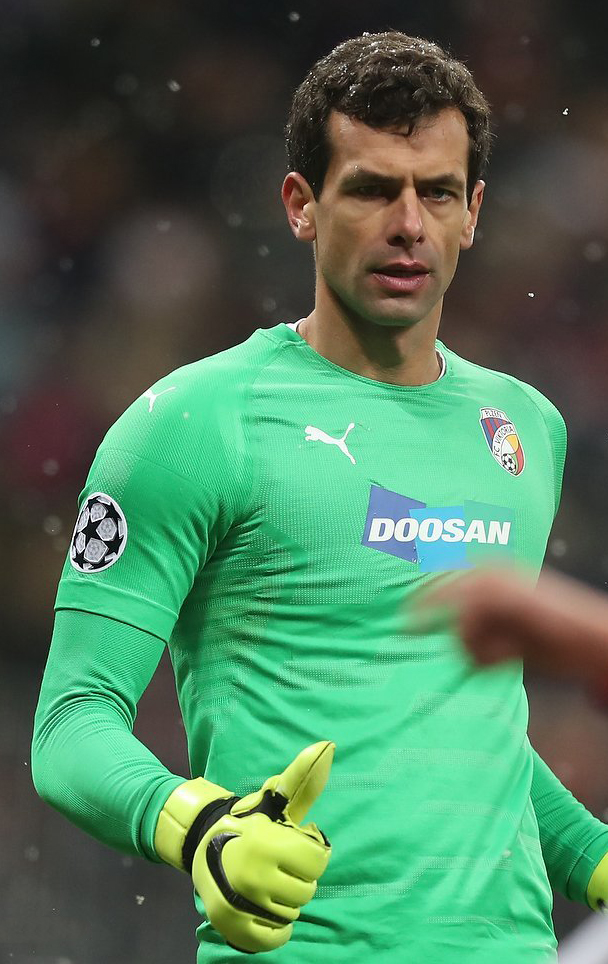
- Hruška in 2018

Personal information
- Date of birth: 23 November 1985 (age 40)
- Place of birth: Městec Králové, Czechoslovakia
- Height: 1.92 m (6 ft 4 in)
- Position: Goalkeeper

Youth career
- AC Sparta Prague

Senior career*
Years	Team	Apps	(Gls)
2005–2010	FK Viktoria Žižkov	7	(0)
2007–2008	→ 1. FK Příbram (loan)	30	(0)
2009	→ 1. FK Příbram (loan)	14	(0)
2010–2017	1. FK Příbram	176	(0)
2014–2015	→ Mladá Boleslav (loan)	26	(0)
2017–2022	Viktoria Plzeň	78	(0)

International career
2001	Czech Republic U15	3	(0)
2001–2002	Czech Republic U17	9	(0)
2003	Czech Republic U18	2	(0)
- * Club domestic league appearances and goals

Aleš Hruška (born 23 November 1985) is a Czech former football goalkeeper.

== International career ==
In May 2011 he received his first call-up for the Czech national football team. He was called up again in May 2015 for a friendly against Iceland.
