= Róbert Matejov =

Slovak footballer

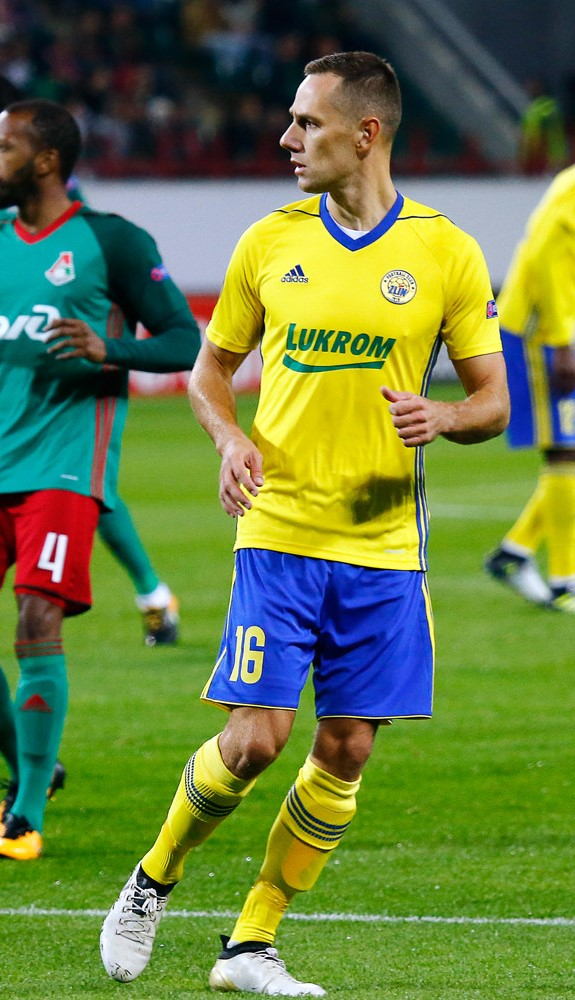

Personal information
- Full name: Róbert Matejov
- Date of birth: 5 July 1988 (age 38)
- Place of birth: Czechoslovakia
- Height: 1.80 m (5 ft 11 in)
- Positions: Midfielder; left back

Team information
- Current team: MFK Skalica
- Number: 16

Youth career
- Dubnica

Senior career*
Years	Team	Apps	(Gls)
–2010	Dubnica		
2010	→ Šaľa (loan)		
2011–2012	Varnsdorf	5	(0)
2012–2022	Zlín	181	(11)
2022–2023	Zbrojovka Brno	12	(1)
2023–2025	Skalica	52	(7)
- * Club domestic league appearances and goals as of 25 June 2025

Róbert Matejov (born 5 July 1988), is a Slovak professional footballer who plays for MFK Skalica as a midfielder.
