= 2021–22 FC Viktoria Plzeň season =

Viktoria Plzeň
2021–22 season
- President: Adolf Šádek
- Head coach: Michal Bílek
- Stadium: Doosan Arena
- Czech First League: 1st (champions)
- Czech Cup: Fourth round
- UEFA Europa Conference League: Play-off round
- Top goalscorer: League: Jean-David Beauguel (19); All: Jean-David Beauguel (21)
Home colours	Away colours	Third colours

The 2021–22 season was the 110th season in the existence of FC Viktoria Plzeň and the club's 29th consecutive season in the top flight of Czech football. In addition to the domestic league, Viktoria Plzeň participated in this season's editions of the Czech Cup and the UEFA Europa Conference League.

== Players ==
=== First-team squad ===
As of 4 March 2022.

Note: Flags indicate national team as defined under FIFA eligibility rules; some limited exceptions apply. Players may hold more than one non-FIFA nationality.

No.	Pos.	Nation	Player
2	DF	CZE	Lukáš Hejda
4	DF	CZE	Luděk Pernica
7	MF	CZE	Jan Sýkora (on loan from Lech Poznań)
9	FW	FRA	Jean-David Beauguel
10	MF	CZE	Jan Kopic
11	FW	SVK	Matej Trusa
12	MF	CZE	Roman Potočný (on loan from Baník Ostrava)
13	GK	SVK	Marián Tvrdoň
14	DF	CZE	Radim Řezník
15	FW	CZE	Tomáš Chorý
16	GK	CZE	Aleš Hruška
18	MF	COL	Jhon Mosquera

No.	Pos.	Nation	Player
20	MF	CZE	Pavel Bucha
23	MF	CZE	Lukáš Kalvach
24	DF	CZE	Milan Havel
25	MF	CZE	Aleš Čermák
31	MF	CZE	Pavel Šulc
33	DF	BRA	Eduardo Santos (on loan from Karviná)
35	DF	CZE	Filip Kaša
36	GK	CZE	Jindřich Staněk
44	DF	CZE	Libor Holík (on loan from Jablonec)
57	MF	CZE	Ondřej Pachlopník (on loan from Zbrojovka Brno)
66	MF	SVK	Miroslav Káčer

=== Out on loan ===
Note: Flags indicate national team as defined under FIFA eligibility rules; some limited exceptions apply. Players may hold more than one non-FIFA nationality.

No.	Pos.	Nation	Player
—	MF	COD	Joel Ngandu Kayamba (at Samsunspor)
—	MF	CRO	Marko Alvir (at Maribor)
—	MF	SEN	Modou N'Diaye (at Karviná)
—	MF	CZE	Šimon Falta (at Baník Ostrava)
—	MF	CZE	Dominik Janošek (at Baník Ostrava)
—	DF	CZE	Robin Hranáč (at Pardubice)
—	FW	CZE	Lukáš Matějka (at Pardubice)
—	MF	CZE	Michal Hlavatý (at Mladá Boleslav)

No.	Pos.	Nation	Player
—	FW	CZE	Ondřej Mihálik (at České Budějovice)
—	DF	CZE	Matěj Hybš (at Bruk-Bet Termalica Nieciecza)
—	GK	CZE	Dominik Sváček (at Liptovský Mikuláš)
—	GK	CZE	Jakub Šiman (at Zbrojovka Brno)
—	FW	CZE	Adam Alexandr (at Příbram)
—	DF	CZE	Šimon Gabriel (at Viktoria Žižkov)
—	DF	CZE	Josef Koželuh (at Chrudim)
—	DF	CZE	Václav Míka (at Chrudim)

== Pre-season and friendlies ==
Win Draw Loss Fixtures

26 June 2021 Friendly	Viktoria Plzeň (Czech Republic)	4–1	(Slovakia) Spartak Trnava	Plzeň, Czech Republic
11:00 CEST (UTC+2)				Stadium: Stadion Luční ulice

30 June 2021 Friendly	Viktoria Plzeň (Czech Republic)	3–0	(Czech Republic) Příbram	Plzeň, Czech Republic
16:00 CEST (UTC+2)				Stadium: Stadion Luční ulice

3 July 2021 Friendly	Viktoria Plzeň (Czech Republic)	Cancelled	(Germany) Erzgebirge Aue	Plzeň, Czech Republic
--:-- CEST (UTC+2)				Stadium: Stadion Luční ulice

3 July 2021 Friendly	Viktoria Plzeň (Czech Republic)	4–2	(Czech Republic) Jiskra Domažlice	Plzeň, Czech Republic
10:00 CEST (UTC+2)				Stadium: Stadion Luční ulice
Note: Four halves of 30 minutes.

8 July 2021 Friendly	Viktoria Plzeň (Czech Republic)	1–1	(Romania) Sepsi	Waidring, Austria
17:00 CEST (UTC+2)				Stadium: Waldstadion Waidring

12 July 2021 Friendly	Viktoria Plzeň (Czech Republic)	0–2	(Russia) Ufa	Kössen, Austria
17:00 CEST (UTC+2)				Stadium: Kaiserwinkl Arena

15 July 2021 Friendly	Viktoria Plzeň (Czech Republic)	1–0	(Russia) Arsenal Tula	Austria
15:00 CEST (UTC+2)

== Competitions ==
=== Overall record ===
Competition	First match	Last match	Starting round	Final position	Record							
Competition	First match	Last match	Starting round	Final position	Pld	W	D	L	GF	GA	GD	Win %
Czech First League	25 July 2021	15 May 2022	Matchday 1	Winners	35	26	7	2	61	21	+40	74.29
Czech Cup	21 September 2021	27 October 2021	Third round	Fourth round	2	1	0	1	2	3	−1	50.00
UEFA Europa Conference League	22 July 2021	26 August 2021	Second qualifying round	Play-off round	6	4	0	2	11	10	+1	66.67
Total					43	31	7	5	74	34	+40	72.09

Source: Soccerway

=== Czech First League ===
==== League table ====
Pos	Team	Pld	W	D	L	GF	GA	GD	Pts	Qualification or relegation
1	Slavia Prague	30	23	4	3	71	19	+52	73	Qualification for the championship group
2	Viktoria Plzeň	30	22	6	2	53	19	+34	72	Qualification for the championship group
3	Sparta Prague	30	20	6	4	65	32	+33	66	Qualification for the championship group
4	Slovácko	30	18	5	7	50	30	+20	59	Qualification for the championship group
5	Baník Ostrava	30	14	9	7	54	39	+15	51	Qualification for the championship group

Source: Fortuna Liga
Rules for classification: 1) Points; 2) Head-to-head points; 3) Head-to-head goal difference; 4) Head-to-head goals scored; 5) Goal difference; 6) Goals scored; 7) Fair-play ranking; 8) Draw.

Pos	Team	Pld	W	D	L	GF	GA	GD	Pts	Qualification or relegation	PLZ	SLA	SPA	SLO	OST	HKR
1	Viktoria Plzeň (C)	35	26	7	2	63	21	+42	85	Qualification for the Champions League second qualifying round	—	—	3–0	3–1	1–0	—
2	Slavia Prague	35	24	6	5	80	27	+53	78	Qualification for the Europa Conference League second qualifying round	1–1	—	1–2	3–0	—	—
3	Sparta Prague	35	22	7	6	72	40	+32	73	Qualification for the Europa Conference League second qualifying round	—	—	—	1–2	3–1	1–1
4	Slovácko	35	21	5	9	59	38	+21	68	Qualification to Europa League third qualifying round (Note: Slovácko qualified for the Europa League as Czech Cup winners.)	—	—	—	—	3–1	3–0
5	Baník Ostrava	35	15	10	10	60	48	+12	55		—	1–1	—	—	—	3–1

Source: Fortuna Liga
Legend: Blue = home team win; Yellow = draw; Red = away team win.
Rules for classification: 1) Total points; 2) Points earned in regular season; 3) Head-to-head points (regular season); 4) Head-to-head goal difference (regular season); 5) Head-to-head goals scored (regular season); 5) Goal difference (all matches); 6) Goals scored (all matches); 7) Fair-play ranking; 8) Draw.
(C) Champions
Notes:

Pos	Team	Pld	W	D	L	GF	GA	GD	Pts	Qualification or relegation	PCE	ZLN	JAB	BOH	TEP	KAR
11	Pardubice	35	9	10	16	42	68	−26	37		—	1–1	—	—	—	2–0
12	Fastav Zlín	35	9	9	17	43	60	−17	36		—	—	1–1	1–4	3–0	—
13	Jablonec	35	6	16	13	27	48	−21	34		0–1	—	—	1–1	—	2–0
14	Bohemians 1905 (O)	35	8	10	17	45	61	−16	34	Qualification for the relegation play-offs	0–1	—	—	—	—	4–0
15	Teplice (O)	35	8	5	22	33	59	−26	29	Qualification for the relegation play-offs	0–2	—	0–1	2–2	—	—
16	Karviná (R)	35	3	10	22	33	63	−30	19	Relegation to the FNL	—	1–1	—	—	2–2	—

Source: Fortuna Liga
Legend: Blue = home team win; Yellow = draw; Red = away team win.
Rules for classification: 1) Total points; 2) Points earned in regular season; 3) Head-to-head points (regular season); 4) Head-to-head goal difference (regular season); 5) Head-to-head goals scored (regular season); 5) Goal difference (all matches); 6) Goals scored (all matches); 7) Fair-play ranking; 8) Draw.
(O) Play-off winners; (R) Relegated

==== Results summary ====
Overall								Home						Away					
Pld	W	D	L	GF	GA	GD	Pts	W	D	L	GF	GA	GD	W	D	L	GF	GA	GD
35	26	7	2	63	21	+42	85	16	2	0	42	9	+33	10	5	2	21	12	+9

Last updated: 15 May 2022.
Source: Fortuna Liga

==== Results by round ====
Round	1	2	3	4	5	6	7	8	9	10	11	12	13	14	15	16	17	18	19	20	21	22	23	24	25	26	27	28	29	30	31	32	33	34	35
Ground	H	A	H	A	H	A	H	H	A	H	A	H	A	H	A	H	A	H	A	H	A	A	H	A	H	A	H	A	H	A	H	A	H	A	H
Result	W	W	W	W	W	L	W	W	W	W	W	W	L	D	D	W	W	W	W	W	D	W	W	W	W	D	D	D	W	W	W	D	W	W	W
Position	2	3	2	2	2	3	2	2	2	1	1	1	1	2	3	2	2	2	2	1	2	2	2	2	1	1	1	1	1	1	1	1	1	1	1

Updated to match(es) played on 15 May 2022. Source: Fortuna Liga
A = Away; H = Home; W = Win; D = Draw; L = Loss

==== Matches ====
25 July 2021 1	Viktoria Plzeň	2–1	Mladá Boleslav	Plzeň
16:00 CEST (UTC+2)	Beauguel 28'; Řezník 36'; N'Diaye (yellow card) 43'	Report	Karafiát (yellow card) 23'; Škoda 62'; Douděra (yellow card) 90+5'	Stadium: Doosan Arena; Attendance: 4,321; Referee: Ondřej Berka

1 August 2021 2	Bohemians	1–2	Viktoria Plzeň	Prague
19:00 CEST (UTC+2)	Puškáč 23' (pen.); Hronek (yellow card) 39'; Květ (yellow card) 57'; Levin (yellow card) 70'; Bartek (yellow card) 90+3'	Report	Mosquera (yellow card) 36'; Beauguel 52' (pen.); Šulc (yellow card) 58'; Káčer 72'; Kayamba (yellow card) 79'	Stadium: Ďolíček; Attendance: 3,584; Referee: Jan Machálek

8 August 2021 3	Viktoria Plzeň	2–1	Slovácko	Plzeň
19:00 CEST (UTC+2)				Stadium: Doosan Arena

15 August 2021 4	Slovan Liberec	0–1	Viktoria Plzeň	Liberec
19:00 CEST (UTC+2)	Koscelník (yellow card) 51'	Report	Řezník 51'; Pernica (yellow card) 54'; Chorý (yellow card) 62'; Hruška (yellow card) 84'; Janošek (yellow card) 85'; Brabec (yellow card) 90+2'; Hybš (yellow card) 90+3'; Káčer (yellow card) 90+5'	Stadium: Stadion u Nisy; Attendance: 3,892; Referee: (Czech Republic) Karel Hrubeš

22 August 2021 5	Viktoria Plzeň	2–0	Karviná	Plzeň
16:00 CEST (UTC+2)	Chorý 33' (pen.); Janošek (yellow card) 55'; Kaša 76'; Havel (yellow card) 77'	Report	Křapka (yellow card) 33'; Papadopulos (yellow card) 37'; Eduardo Santos (yellow card) 45'; Šehić (yellow card) 68'; Jurásek (yellow card) 75'	Stadium: Doosan Arena; Attendance: 6,520; Referee: (Czech Republic) Ondřej Pechanec

29 August 2021 6	Hradec Králové	1–0	Viktoria Plzeň	Mladá Boleslav
16:00 CEST (UTC+2)	Petr Kodeš (yellow card) 19'; Dvořák (yellow card) 26'; Král (yellow card) 37'; Rada 58'; Michal Leibl (yellow card) 60'; Štěpán Harazim (yellow card) 90+6'; Vilém Fendrich (yellow card) 90+7'	Report	Chorý (yellow card) 90+3'; Řezník (yellow card) 90+4'	Stadium: Lokotrans Aréna; Attendance: 1,243; Referee: (Czech Republic) Tomáš Klíma

11 September 2021 7	Viktoria Plzeň	3–2	Sparta Prague	Plzeň
19:00 CEST (UTC+2)	Mosquera (yellow card) 16' (goal) 32'; Beauguel 18'; Janošek (yellow card) 29'; Sýkora 56'; Řezník (yellow card) 64'; Hybš (yellow card) 90+3'	Report	Moberg Karlsson 40'; Pavelka (yellow card) 66'; Štetina (yellow card) 82'; Drchal 87'	Stadium: Doosan Arena; Attendance: 10,584; Referee: (Czech Republic) Ondřej Berka

18 September 2021 8	Viktoria Plzeň	2–1	České Budějovice	Plzeň
19:00 CEST (UTC+2)	Havel (yellow card) 42'; Řezník 69'; Hejda 79'; Beauguel (yellow card) 82'; Pernica (yellow card) 90+1'; Staněk (yellow card) 90+5'	Report	Patrik Čavoš (yellow card) 34'; Fortune Bassey 53'	Stadium: Doosan Arena; Attendance: 9,312; Referee: (Czech Republic) Jan Petřík

25 September 2021 9	Pardubice	0–1	Viktoria Plzeň	Prague
16:00 CEST (UTC+2)	Kostka (yellow card) 79'	Report	Hejda 75'	Stadium: Ďolíček; Attendance: 1,562; Referee: (Czech Republic) Petr Hocek

2 October 2021 10	Viktoria Plzeň	2–1	Zlín	Plzeň
19:00 CEST (UTC+2)	Beauguel 6' (pen.) 84'; Kalvach (yellow card) 18'	Report	Vraštil 15'; Condé (yellow card) 45+3'	Stadium: Doosan Arena; Attendance: 6,121; Referee: (Czech Republic) Pavel Franěk

17 October 2021 11	Teplice	0–1	Viktoria Plzeň	Teplice
16:00 CEST (UTC+2)	Fortelný (yellow card) 45'; Jan Knapík (yellow card) 90+2'; David Černý (yellow card) 90+4'	Report	Beauguel 5'; Kalvach (yellow card) 56'; Kaša (yellow card) 60'; Hejda (yellow card) 87'; Řezník (yellow card) 88'	Stadium: AGC Aréna Na Stínadlech; Attendance: 3,362; Referee: (Czech Republic) Pavel Julínek

24 October 2021 12	Viktoria Plzeň	5–0	Jablonec	Plzeň
16:00 CEST (UTC+2)	Kopic 15' 70'; Beauguel 18'; Havel (yellow card) 20'; Mosquera 73'; Šulc 89'	Report	Krob (yellow card) 64'; Malínský (yellow card) 82'	Stadium: Doosan Arena; Attendance: 7,607; Referee: (Czech Republic) Karel Hrubeš

31 October 2021 13	Slavia Prague	2–0	Viktoria Plzeň	Prague
18:00 CEST (UTC+2)	Ekpai (yellow card) 48'; Lingr 65'; Krmenčík (yellow card) 90+3' (goal) 90+5'	Report	Řezník (red card) 11'; Kalvach (yellow card) 26'; Mosquera (yellow card) 58' (yellow-red card) 90+1'; Pernica (red card) 81'	Stadium: Sinobo Stadium; Attendance: 18,179; Referee: (Czech Republic) Pavel Franěk

6 November 2021 14	Viktoria Plzeň	0–0	Sigma Olomouc	Plzeň
18:00 CET (UTC+1)	Kaša (yellow card) 53' (yellow-red card) 57'; Kalvach (yellow card) 87'; Beauguel (yellow card) 90+1'	Report	Hubník (red card) 45'; Poulolo (yellow card) 84'; Macík (yellow card) 90+4'	Stadium: Doosan Arena; Attendance: 5,015; Referee: (Czech Republic) Ondřej Ginzel

20 November 2021 15	Baník Ostrava	2–2	Viktoria Plzeň	Ostrava
18:00 CET (UTC+1)	Juroška (yellow card) 45+1'; Fleišman (yellow card) 57'; Jiří Klíma 67' 83'; Almási (yellow card) 90+6'	Report	Mosquera 12'; Beauguel (yellow card) 28' (goal) 36' (pen.); Sýkora (yellow card) 75'	Stadium: Městský stadion Attendance: 6,774; Referee: (Czech Republic) Jan Petřík

27 November 2021 16	Viktoria Plzeň	6–0	Bohemians 1905	Plzeň
18:00 CET (UTC+1)	Pernica 10'; Kopic 31'; Mosquera 36'; Bucha 62'; Sýkora 64'; Kayamba 79'	Report		Stadium: Doosan Arena; Attendance: 1,000; Referee: (Czech Republic) Ondřej Berka

5 December 2021 17	Slovácko	1–2	Viktoria Plzeň	Uherské Hradiště
18:00 CET (UTC+1)	Šašinka 90+3'	Report	Havel 1'; Sýkora (yellow card) 45+3'; Bucha (yellow card) 64'; Beauguel 68'; Mosquera (yellow card) 74'	Stadium: Městský fotbalový stadion Miroslava Valenty; Attendance: 991; Referee: (Czech Republic) Ondřej Pechanec

11 December 2021 18	Viktoria Plzeň	2–0	Slovan Liberec	Plzeň
18:00 CET (UTC+1)	Řezník 17'; Sýkora 27'; Beauguel (yellow card) 40'; Hejda (yellow card) 83'	Report		Stadium: Doosan Arena; Attendance: 1,000; Referee: (Czech Republic) Dalibor Černý

18 December 2021 19	Karviná	0–1	Viktoria Plzeň	Karviná
15:00 CET (UTC+1)		Report	Havel 45'	Stadium: Městský stadion Attendance: 912; Referee: (Czech Republic) Tomáš Klíma

6 February 2022 20	Viktoria Plzeň	1–0	Hradec Králové	Plzeň
18:00 CET (UTC+1)	Chorý 28'	Report	Kučera (yellow card) 68'	Stadium: Doosan Arena; Attendance: 1,000; Referee: (Czech Republic) Jan Machálek

13 February 2022 21	Sparta Prague	2–2	Viktoria Plzeň	Prague
18:00 CET (UTC+1)	Pavelka 71'; Holec (yellow card) 89'; Hložek 90+1'	Report	Chorý 20'; Sýkora (yellow card) 29'; Hejda (yellow card) 51' (goal) 53'	Stadium: Generali Česká pojišťovna Arena; Attendance: 1,000; Referee: (Czech Republic) Ondřej Berka

19 February 2022 22	České Budějovice	0–1	Viktoria Plzeň	České Budějovice
18:00 CET (UTC+1)	Pavel Novák (yellow card) 53'; Hellebrand (yellow card) 86'	Report	Kalvach (yellow card) 45+1'; Holík (yellow card) 74'; Bucha 75'	Stadium: Stadion Střelecký ostrov Attendance: 3,278; Referee: (Czech Republic) Tomáš Klíma

26 February 2022 23	Viktoria Plzeň	4–0	Pardubice	Plzeň
18:00 CET (UTC+1)	Hejda 34'; Kopic 44'; Havel 49'; Chorý 90+1'	Report	Filip Čihák (yellow card) 7' (yellow-red card) 20'; Dominik Kostka (yellow card) 66'	Stadium: Doosan Arena; Attendance: 6,184; Referee: (Czech Republic) Josef Krejsa

5 March 2022 24	Zlín	1–2	Viktoria Plzeň	Zlín
15:00 CET (UTC+1)	Kaša 13' (o.g.); Hrubý (yellow card) 61'; Condé (yellow card) 83'; Vraštil (yellow card) 85'	Report	Beauguel 39'; Chorý 50' (pen.) (yellow card) 87'; Kalvach (yellow card) 54'; Káčer (yellow card) 90+2'	Stadium: Letná Stadion; Attendance: 3,312; Referee: (Czech Republic) Dalibor Černý

12 March 2022 25	Viktoria Plzeň	1–0	Teplice	Plzeň
18:00 CET (UTC+1)	Beauguel 44' (pen.) (yellow card) 81'; Havel (red card) 45+6'; Staněk (yellow card) 90+4'	Report	Fortelný (yellow card) 39'; Tijani (yellow card) 53'; Mareš (yellow card) 90+1'	Stadium: Doosan Arena; Attendance: 9,560; Referee: (Czech Republic) Marek Radina

19 March 2022 26	Jablonec	0–0	Viktoria Plzeň	Jablonec nad Nisou
18:00 CET (UTC+1)	Silný (yellow card) 68'; Dominik Pleštil (yellow card) 79'	Report	Trusa (yellow card) 90+1'	Stadium: Stadion Střelnice; Attendance: 2,175; Referee: (Czech Republic) Jan Machálek

3 April 2022 27	Viktoria Plzeň	1–1	Slavia Prague	Plzeň
19:00 CET (UTC+1)	Sýkora (yellow card) 8'; Kopic (yellow card) 45+1'; Bucha (yellow card) 60' (yellow-red card) 85'; Chorý 75'	Report	Lingr 48' (yellow card) 61'; Holeš (yellow card) 74'	Stadium: Doosan Arena; Attendance: 11,384; Referee: (Poland) Paweł Raczkowski

9 April 2022 28	Sigma Olomouc	1–1	Viktoria Plzeň	Olomouc
16:00 CET (UTC+1)	Růsek (yellow card) 34' (goal) 66'; Chvátal (yellow card) 90+4'	Report	Beauguel 57'; Kopic (yellow card) 69'; Čermák (yellow card) 75'	Stadium: Andrův stadion Attendance: 4,078; Referee: (Czech Republic) Petr Hocek

17 April 2022 29	Viktoria Plzeň	2–1	Baník Ostrava	Plzeň
17:00 CET (UTC+1)	Mosquera 31'; Řezník (yellow card) 54'; Bucha 65'	Report	Takács (yellow card) 46'; Pokorný (yellow card) 54'; Jiří Klíma (yellow card) 54'; Havel 61' (o.g.)	Stadium: Doosan Arena; Attendance: 10,726; Referee: (Czech Republic) Ondřej Berka

20 April 2022 30	Mladá Boleslav	0–2	Viktoria Plzeň	Mladá Boleslav
18:00 CET (UTC+1)	Sladký (yellow card) 51'	Report	Havel 3' (yellow card) 35'; Kalvach (yellow card) 25'; Mosquera (yellow card) 77'; Kopic 84'	Stadium: Lokotrans Aréna; Attendance: 2,467; Referee: (Czech Republic) Dalibor Černý

=== Championship Group ===
24 April 2022 31	Viktoria Plzeň	3–1	Slovácko	Plzeň
16:00 CET	Beauguel 5' 75' (pen.); Sýkora 35'	Report	Cicilia 29' (pen.)	Stadium: Doosan Arena; Attendance: 7,213; Referee: (Czech Republic) Tomáš Klíma

1 May 2022 32	Slavia Prague	1–1	Viktoria Plzeň	Prague
19:00 CET	Kúdela 90+1' (pen.); Provod (yellow card) 90+2'; Hovorka (yellow card) 90+4'	Report	Havel (yellow card) 14'; Kopic (yellow card) 64'; Staněk (yellow card) 90'; Beauguel 90+5' (pen.)	Stadium: Sinobo Stadium; Attendance: 18,732; Referee: (Poland) Bartosz Frankowski

8 May 2022 33	Viktoria Plzeň	3–0	Sparta Prague	Plzeň
16:00 CET	Beauguel 8' (yellow card) 45+1'; Havel 21'; Bucha (red card) 26'; Hejda 34'	Report	Dočkal (yellow card) 23'; Čvančara (yellow card) 45+1'; Krejčí (yellow card) 45+1' (yellow-red card) 54'; Sáček (yellow card) 78'	Stadium: Doosan Arena; Attendance: 11,385; Referee: (Czech Republic) Dalibor Černý

11 May 2022 34	Hradec Králové	0–2	Viktoria Plzeň	Mladá Boleslav
19:00 CET		Report	Beauguel 20'; Mosquera 55'; Kalvach (yellow card) 57'; Chorý (yellow card) 84'; Trusa (yellow card) 85'	Stadium: Lokotrans Aréna; Attendance: 3,294; Referee: (Czech Republic) Ondřej Berka

15 May 2022 35	Viktoria Plzeň	1–0	Baník Ostrava	Plzeň
17:00 CET	Beauguel 42' (pen.) (yellow card) 74'	Report	Chlumecký (yellow card) 81'; Pokorný (yellow card) 87'	Stadium: Doosan Arena; Attendance: 11,293; Referee: (Czech Republic) Dominik Starý

=== Czech Cup ===
21 September 2021 Third Round	Viktoria Plzeň	2–1	Příbram	Plzeň
17:00 CET	Havel 4'; Šulc 65'; Kayamba (yellow card) 73'	Report	Zorvan 8'; Denis Halinský (yellow card) 81'; Sus (yellow card) 89'	Stadium: Doosan Arena; Attendance: 1,831; Referee: (Czech Republic) Ondřej Pechanec

27 October 2021 Round Of 16	Mladá Boleslav	2–0	Viktoria Plzeň	Mladá Boleslav
15:00 CET	Skalák (yellow card) 25'; Matějovský (yellow card) 40' (yellow-red card) 77'; Ewerton 55'; Jurásek 59'; Suchý (yellow card) 64'; Douděra (yellow card) 89'	Report	Hejda (yellow card) 68'; Mosquera (yellow card) 72'	Stadium: Lokotrans Aréna; Referee: (Czech Republic) Jan Petřík

=== UEFA Europa Conference League ===
==== Qualifying rounds ====
===== Second qualifying round =====
The draw for the second qualifying round was held on 16 June 2021.

22 July 2021 First leg	Viktoria Plzeň (Czech Republic)	2–1	(Belarus) Dynamo Brest	Plzeň, Czech Republic
19:00 CEST (UTC+2)	Šulc 22', (yellow card) 90+2'; N'Diaye (yellow card) 29'; Kaša 33'	Report	Bilenkyi (yellow card) 51'; Shestyuk 79'; Lynko (yellow card) 80'; Yasyukevich (yellow card) 81'	Stadium: Doosan Arena; Attendance: 4,468; Referee: Jonathan Lardot (Belgium)

29 July 2021 Second leg	Dynamo Brest (Belarus)	1–2 (2–4 agg.)	(Czech Republic) Viktoria Plzeň	Yerevan, Armenia
20:00 CEST (UTC+2)	Yasyukevich (yellow card) 40'; Slabashevich (yellow card) 79'; Bilenkyi 90+1'; Oreshkevich (yellow card) 90+4'	Report	Kayamba 12'; Řezník 71'	Stadium: Technical Center-Academy; Referee: Mohammed Al-Hakim (Sweden)
Note: Dynamo Brest played their home match at Technical Center-Academy in Yerevan, instead of their regular stadium Regional Sport Complex Brestsky in Brest, as in June 2021 UEFA suspended most matches to be played in Belarus, due to European Union sanctions in response to the Ryanair Flight 4978 incident which banned European Union airlines from flying over Belarusian airspace.

===== Third qualifying round =====
The draw for the third qualifying round was held on 19 July 2021.

5 August 2021 First leg	The New Saints (Wales)	4–2	(Czech Republic) Viktoria Plzeň	Cardiff, Wales
20:45 CEST (UTC+2)	Hudson 19'; McManus 30' (pen.), 54' (pen.), 76'; Redmond (yellow card) 59'	Report	Brabec (yellow card) 53'; N'Diaye (yellow card) 56'; Beauguel 89', (yellow card) 90'; Ba Loua 90+5'	Stadium: Cardiff City Stadium; Referee: Juri Frischer (Estonia)
Note: The New Saints played their third qualifying Round match at Cardiff City Stadium, instead of their regular stadium Park Hall, Oswestry due to UEFA requirements.

12 August 2021 Second leg	Viktoria Plzeň (Czech Republic)	3–1 (a.e.t.) (5–5 agg.) (4–1 p)	(Wales) The New Saints	Plzeň, Czech Republic
19:00 CEST (UTC+2)	Bucha 56'; Chorý 85'; Beauguel 90+2'	Report	Robles 4'	Stadium: Doosan Arena; Referee: Sascha Stegemann (Germany)
	Penalties
	Beauguel (penalty scored); Bucha (penalty scored); Chorý (penalty scored); Káčer (penalty scored)		(penalty missed) Marriott; (penalty missed) Smith; (penalty scored) Redmond

==== Play-off round ====
The draw for the play-off round was held on 2 August 2021.

19 August 2021 First leg	Viktoria Plzeň (Czech Republic)	2–0	(Bulgaria) CSKA Sofia	Plzeň, Czech Republic
19:00 CEST (UTC+2)	Havel 11'; Mosquera 72'	Report		Stadium: Doosan Arena; Referee: Tiago Martins (Portugal)

26 August 2021 Second leg	CSKA Sofia (Bulgaria)	3–0 (a.e.t.) (3–2 agg.)	(Czech Republic) Viktoria Plzeň	Sofia, Bulgaria
20:00 CEST (UTC+2)	Carey 6'; Yomov 63'; Mattheij 119'	Report		Stadium: Vasil Levski National Stadium; Referee: Ali Palabıyık (Turkey)
