= 2022–23 FC Viktoria Plzeň season =

Czech First League football season

Viktoria Plzeň
2022–23 season
- President: Adolf Šádek
- Head coach: Michal Bílek
- Stadium: Doosan Arena
- Czech First League: 3rd
- Czech Cup: Third round
- UEFA Champions League: Group stage
Home colours	Away colours	Third colours

The 2022–23 season was the 111th season in the existence of FC Viktoria Plzeň and the club's 30th consecutive season in the top flight of Czech football. In addition to the domestic league, Viktoria Plzeň participated in this season's editions of the Czech Cup and UEFA Champions League.

== Players ==
=== First-team squad ===
As of 13 February 2023.

Note: Flags indicate national team as defined under FIFA eligibility rules; some limited exceptions apply. Players may hold more than one non-FIFA nationality.

No.	Pos.	Nation	Player
1	GK	CZE	Adam Zadražil (on loan from Silon Táborsko)
2	DF	CZE	Lukáš Hejda
4	DF	CZE	Luděk Pernica
6	MF	CZE	Václav Pilař
7	MF	CZE	Jan Sýkora
9	FW	CZE	Jan Kliment
10	MF	CZE	Jan Kopic
11	FW	CZE	Matěj Vydra
13	GK	SVK	Marián Tvrdoň
14	DF	CZE	Radim Řezník
15	FW	CZE	Tomáš Chorý
17	FW	NGR	Rafiu Durosinmi (on loan from Karviná)

No.	Pos.	Nation	Player
18	MF	COL	Jhon Mosquera
19	MF	CZE	Roman Květ
20	MF	CZE	Pavel Bucha
21	DF	CZE	Václav Jemelka
23	MF	CZE	Lukáš Kalvach
24	DF	CZE	Milan Havel
35	DF	CZE	Filip Kaša
36	GK	CZE	Jindřich Staněk
44	DF	CZE	Libor Holík
77	MF	SVK	Erik Jirka
88	MF	CZE	Adam Vlkanova
99	MF	SEN	Modou N'Diaye

=== Out on loan ===
Note: Flags indicate national team as defined under FIFA eligibility rules; some limited exceptions apply. Players may hold more than one non-FIFA nationality.

No.	Pos.	Nation	Player
—	GK	CZE	Dominik Sváček (at Liptovský Mikuláš)
—	MF	SVK	Miroslav Káčer (at Dunajská Streda)
—	GK	CZE	Martin Jedlička (at Bohemians 1905)
—	MF	CZE	Aleš Čermák (at Bohemians 1905)
—	MF	CZE	Pavel Šulc (at Jablonec)
—	MF	CZE	Šimon Falta (at Zbrojovka Brno)
—	DF	CZE	Josef Koželuh (at Zbrojovka Brno)
—	DF	BEN	Mohamed Tijani (at Zbrojovka Brno)
—	DF	CZE	Matěj Hybš (at Teplice)
—	DF	CZE	Filip Čihák (at Hradec Králové)
—	FW	SVK	Matej Trusa (at Hradec Králové)
—	MF	BRA	Cadu (at Baník Ostrava)

No.	Pos.	Nation	Player
—	DF	CZE	Robin Hranáč (at Pardubice)
—	DF	CZE	Václav Míka (at Chrudim)
—	MF	CZE	Matyáš Kodýdek (at Chrudim)
—	FW	CZE	Tomáš Jedlička (at Chrudim)
—	GK	CZE	Ondřej Mrózek (at Karviná)
—	DF	CZE	Adam Vrba (at Karviná)
—	MF	CZE	Dominik Kříž (at Varnsdorf)
—	DF	CZE	Šimon Gabriel (at Vysočina Jihlava)
—	FW	CZE	Lukáš Matějka (at Dukla Prague)
—	MF	CZE	Alexandr Sojka (at Silon Táborsko)
—	MF	CZE	Adam Alexandr (at Silon Táborsko)

== Pre-season and friendlies ==
18 June 2022 Friendly	(Czech Republic) Viktoria Plzeň	6 - 0	Klatovy (Czech Republic)	Žákava
10:30 CEST		Report		Stadium: Stadion FK Žákava

22 June 2022 Friendly	(Czech Republic) Viktoria Plzeň	9 - 0	Slavia Karlovy Vary (Czech Republic)	Město Touškov
16:30 CEST		Report		Stadium: Stadion Touškov

28 June 2022 Friendly	(Czech Republic) Viktoria Plzeň	3 - 1	Slovan Bratislava (Slovakia)	Dobřany
16:30 CEST		Report		Stadium: Stadion Dobřany

1 July 2022 Friendly	(Czech Republic) Viktoria Plzeň	3 - 0	Táborsko (Czech Republic)	Plzeň
11:30 CEST		Report		Stadium: Stadion Luční ulice

5 July 2022 Friendly	(Czech Republic) Viktoria Plzeň	0 - 0	Botoșani (Romania)	Westendorf
18:00 CEST		Report		Stadium: Waldstadion Westendorf

8 July 2022 Friendly	(Czech Republic) Viktoria Plzeň	1 - 3	STVV (Belgium)	Westendorf
18:00 CEST		Report		Stadium: Waldstadion Westendorf

12 July 2022 Friendly	(Turkey) Beşiktaş	0 - 0	Viktoria Plzeň (Czech Republic)	Kufstein
16:00 CEST		Report		Stadium: Kufstein-Arena

4 January 2023 Friendly	(Czech Republic) Viktoria Plzeň	3 - 1	Petřín Plzeň (Czech Republic)	Plzeň
15:00 CET		Report		Stadium: Luční UMT

13 January 2023 Friendly	(Czech Republic) Viktoria Plzeň	1 - 1	1. FC Heidenheim (Germany)	La Nucia
15:00 CET		Report		Stadium: Estadi Olímpic Camilo Cano

16 January 2023 Friendly	(Czech Republic) Viktoria Plzeň	1 - 1	Ferencvárosi TC (Hungary)	Benidorm
15:00 CET		Report		Stadium: Melia Villaitana Football Center

20 January 2023 Friendly	(Czech Republic) Viktoria Plzeň	2 - 0	Molde (Norway)	La Nucia
15:00 CET		Report		Stadium: Estadi Olímpic Camilo Cano

== Competitions ==
=== Overall record ===
Competition	First match	Last match	Starting round	Final position	Record							
Competition	First match	Last match	Starting round	Final position	Pld	W	D	L	GF	GA	GD	Win %
Czech First League	30 July 2022	27 May 2023	Matchday 1	3rd	35	18	7	10	60	38	+22	51.43
Czech Cup	19 October 2022	19 October 2022	Third round	Third round	1	0	0	1	2	3	−1	0.00
UEFA Champions League	20 July 2022	1 November 2022	Second qualifying round	Group stage	12	5	1	6	18	28	−10	41.67
Total					48	23	8	17	80	69	+11	47.92

Source: Soccerway

=== Czech First League ===
==== League table ====
Pos	Team	Pld	W	D	L	GF	GA	GD	Pts	Qualification or relegation
1	Sparta Prague	30	20	8	2	70	29	+41	68	Qualification for the championship group
2	Slavia Prague	30	20	6	4	81	25	+56	66	Qualification for the championship group
3	Viktoria Plzeň	30	17	6	7	55	29	+26	57	Qualification for the championship group
4	Bohemians 1905	30	14	6	10	53	49	+4	48	Qualification for the championship group
5	Slovácko	30	13	7	10	36	38	−2	46	Qualification for the championship group

Source: Fortuna Liga
Rules for classification: 1) Points; 2) Head-to-head points; 3) Head-to-head goal difference; 4) Head-to-head goals scored; 5) Goal difference; 6) Goals scored; 7) Fair-play ranking; 8) Draw.

Pos	Team	Pld	W	D	L	GF	GA	GD	Pts	Qualification or relegation	SPA	SLA	PLZ	BOH	SLO	OLO
1	Sparta Prague (C)	35	23	9	3	76	33	+43	78	Qualification for the Champions League third qualifying round	—	3–2	0–1	2–1	—	—
2	Slavia Prague	35	24	6	5	98	31	+67	78	Qualification for the Europa League third qualifying round (Note: Slavia Prague qualified for the Europa League as Czech Cup winners.)	—	—	2–1	6–0	4–0	—
3	Viktoria Plzeň	35	18	7	10	60	38	+22	61	Qualification for the Europa Conference League second qualifying round	—	—	—	0–2	2–2	1–3
4	Bohemians 1905	35	15	7	13	56	58	−2	52	Qualification for the Europa Conference League second qualifying round	—	—	—	—	0–0	0–1
5	Slovácko	35	13	11	11	40	46	−6	50		0–0	—	—	—	—	2–2
6	Sigma Olomouc	35	12	12	11	53	47	+6	48		0–1	2–3	—	—	—	—

Source: Fortuna Liga
Legend: Blue = home team win; Yellow = draw; Red = away team win.
Rules for classification: 1) Total points; 2) Points earned in regular season; 3) Head-to-head points (regular season); 4) Head-to-head goal difference (regular season); 5) Head-to-head goals scored (regular season); 5) Goal difference (all matches); 6) Goals scored (all matches); 7) Fair-play ranking; 8) Draw.
(C) Champions

==== Results summary ====
Overall								Home						Away					
Pld	W	D	L	GF	GA	GD	Pts	W	D	L	GF	GA	GD	W	D	L	GF	GA	GD
35	18	7	10	60	38	+22	61	10	3	5	35	20	+15	8	4	5	25	18	+7

Source: Fortuna Liga

==== Results by round ====
Round	1
Ground	A
Result	D
Position	7

Source: Fortuna Liga
A = Away; H = Home; W = Win; D = Draw; L = Loss

==== Matches ====
30 July 2022 1	Teplice	2–2	Viktoria Plzeň	Teplice
19:00 CEST (UTC+2)	Urbanec 23', 47'	Report	Kliment 58'; Mosquera 71'	Stadium: Na Stínadlech; Attendance: 6,403; Referee: Jan Machálek

6 August 2022 2	Viktoria Plzeň	2–1	Pardubice	Plzeň
16:00 CEST (UTC+2)	Kliment 21'; Havel 75'	Report	Solil 55'	Stadium: Doosan Arena; Attendance: 7,251; Referee: Miroslav Zelinka

13 August 2022 3	Hradec Králové	1–2	Viktoria Plzeň	Mladá Boleslav
19:00 CEST (UTC+2)	Kubala 44'	Report	Chorý 39'; Pilař 84'	Stadium: Lokotrans Aréna; Attendance: 1,900; Referee: Tomáš Klíma

27 August 2022 5	České Budějovice	0–1	Viktoria Plzeň	České Budějovice
16:00 CEST (UTC+2)		Report	Mosquera 90+4'	Stadium: Stadion Střelecký ostrov Attendance: 4,893; Referee: Petr Hocek

31 August 2022 6	Viktoria Plzeň	3–0	Slovácko	Plzeň
17:30 CEST (UTC+2)	Kopic 1'; Bucha 45+2'; Mosquera 70'	Report		Stadium: Doosan Arena; Attendance: 9,121; Referee: Ondřej Berka

3 September 2022 7	Slovan Liberec	0–1	Viktoria Plzeň	Liberec
16:00 CEST (UTC+2)		Report	Sýkora 41'	Stadium: Stadion u Nisy; Attendance: 5,058; Referee: Zbyněk Proske

10 September 2022 8	Sigma Olomouc	2–3	Viktoria Plzeň	Olomouc
16:00 CEST (UTC+2)	Chytil 13', 65'	Report	Chorý 10', 34' (pen.); Havel 68'	Stadium: Andrův stadion Attendance: 4,079; Referee: Marek Radina

18 September 2022 9	Viktoria Plzeň	3–0	Slavia Prague	Plzeň
19:00 CEST (UTC+2)	Chorý 3' (pen.); Mosquera 21'; Kalvach 73'	Report		Stadium: Doosan Arena; Attendance: 11,103; Referee: Petr Hocek

1 October 2022 10	Bohemians 1905	1–1	Viktoria Plzeň	Prague
16:00 CEST (UTC+2)	Drchal 53'	Report	Mosquera 24'	Stadium: Ďolíček; Attendance: 5,712; Referee: Miroslav Zelinka

8 October 2022 11	Viktoria Plzeň	2–0	Mladá Boleslav	Plzeň
19:00 CEST (UTC+2)	Pernica 54'; Jemelka 82'	Report		Stadium: Doosan Arena; Attendance: 7,136; Referee: Dalibor Černý

16 October 2022 12	Jablonec	0–3	Viktoria Plzeň	Jablonec nad Nisou
16:00 CEST (UTC+2)	Chorý 19', 63'; N'Diaye 90+1'	Report		Stadium: Stadion Střelnice; Attendance: 2,426; Referee: Tomáš Klíma

22 October 2022 13	Viktoria Plzeň	3–1	Baník Ostrava	Plzeň
19:00 CEST (UTC+2)	Kalvach 8'; Kliment 20'; Mosquera 78'	Report	Almási 61'	Stadium: Doosan Arena; Attendance: 9,832; Referee: Dominik Starý

29 October 2022 14	Zlín	0–3	Viktoria Plzeň	Zlín
18:00 CEST (UTC+2)		Report	Jirka 20', 68'; Chorý 51'	Stadium: Letná Stadion; Attendance: 3,965; Referee: Miroslav Zelinka

5 November 2022 15	Viktoria Plzeň	0–1	Sparta Prague	Plzeň
18:00 CET (UTC+1)		Report	Pavelka 82'	Stadium: Doosan Arena; Attendance: 10,898; Referee: Dalibor Černý

9 November 2022 4	Viktoria Plzeň	4–0	Zbrojovka Brno	Plzeň
17:00 CET (UTC+1)	Vlkanova 24'; Chorý 53', 79' (pen.); Bassey 89'	Report		Stadium: Doosan Arena; Attendance: 8,436; Referee: Jan Všetečka

13 November 2022 16	Pardubice	1–1	Viktoria Plzeň	Prague (Note: Pardubice played the first half of the season in Ďolíček due to the rebuilding of their stadium.)
15:00 CET (UTC+1)	Černý 56'	Report	Havel 76'	Stadium: Ďolíček; Attendance: 1,469; Referee: Lukáš Nehasil

28 January 2023 17	Viktoria Plzeň	1–2	Hradec Králové	Plzeň
15:00 CET (UTC+1)	Chorý 6'	Report	Smrž 43'; Pudhorocký 72'	Stadium: Doosan Arena; Attendance: 8,135; Referee: Jan Machálek

5 February 2023 18	Zbrojovka Brno	1–3	Viktoria Plzeň	Brno
15:00 CET (UTC+1)	Ševčík 9'	Report	Bucha 59'; Kopic 69'; Vlkanova 90+7'	Stadium: ADAX Invest Arena; Attendance: 5,018; Referee: Pavel Orel

12 February 2023 19	Viktoria Plzeň	2–1	České Budějovice	Plzeň
15:00 CET (UTC+1)	Květ 12', 57'	Report	Jemelka 61' (o.g.)	Stadium: Doosan Arena; Attendance: 8,432; Referee: Jan Petřík

19 February 2023 20	Slovácko	2–0	Viktoria Plzeň	Uherské Hradiště
15:00 CET (UTC+1)	Daníček 26'; Petržela 63'	Report		Stadium: Městský fotbalový stadion Miroslava Valenty; Attendance: 5,319; Referee: Miroslav Zelinka

25 February 2023 21	Viktoria Plzeň	2–1	Slovan Liberec	Plzeň
18:00 CET (UTC+1)	Kopic 21'; Mosquera 68'	Report	Tupta 52'	Stadium: Doosan Arena; Attendance: 8,263; Referee: Ondřej Berka

4 March 2023 22	Viktoria Plzeň	1–1	Sigma Olomouc	Plzeň
15:00 CET (UTC+1)	Bucha 63'	Report	Chytil 68'	Stadium: Doosan Arena; Attendance: 8,341; Referee: Dominik Starý

11 March 2023 23	Slavia Prague	2–1	Viktoria Plzeň	Prague
18:00 CET (UTC+1)	Olayinka 50'; Lingr 76'	Report	Chorý 16'	Stadium: Fortuna Arena; Attendance: 18,678; Referee: Dalibor Černý

19 March 2023 24	Viktoria Plzeň	1–2	Bohemians 1905	Plzeň
18:00 CET (UTC+1)	Vydra 28'	Report	Chorý 53' (o.g.); Köstl 85'	Stadium: Doosan Arena; Attendance: 9,344; Referee: Marek Radina

1 April 2022 25	Mladá Boleslav	0–0	Viktoria Plzeň	Mladá Boleslav
16:00 CEST (UTC+2)		Report		Stadium: Lokotrans Aréna; Attendance: 3,336; Referee: Ondřej Berka

8 April 2022 26	Viktoria Plzeň	3–2	Jablonec	Plzeň
19:00 CEST (UTC+2)	Sýkora 45+3'; Vydra 77', 82'	Report	Polidar 66', 74'	Stadium: Doosan Arena; Attendance: 8,309; Referee: Pavel Orel

16 April 2022 27	Baník Ostrava	2–1	Viktoria Plzeň	Ostrava
19:00 CEST (UTC+2)	Tijani 7', 58'	Report	Hejda 79'	Stadium: Městský stadion Attendance: 7,150; Referee: Dominik Starý

23 April 2022 28	Viktoria Plzeň	4–0	Zlín	Plzeň
19:00 CEST (UTC+2)	Hejda 34'; Vlkanova 49', 58'; Chorý 86'	Report		Stadium: Doosan Arena; Attendance: 8,415; Referee: Michal Křepský

26 April 2022 29	Sparta Prague	2–1	Viktoria Plzeň	Prague
19:30 CEST (UTC+2)	Kuchta 45+3'; L. Krejčí II 90+14'	Report	Durosinmi 30'	Stadium: epet ARENA; Attendance: 17,668; Referee: Pavel Orel

30 April 2022 30	Viktoria Plzeň	1–1	Teplice	Plzeň
15:00 CEST (UTC+2)	Chorý 85'	Report	Hyčka 50'	Stadium: Doosan Arena; Attendance: 8,670; Referee: Petr Hocek

==== Championship group ====
6 May 2023 31	Viktoria Plzeň	2–2	Slovácko	Plzeň
18:00 CEST (UTC+2)	Hejda 47'; Durosinmi 74'	Report	Kalabiška 65'; Vecheta 76'	Stadium: Doosan Arena; Attendance: 7,716; Referee: Jan Petřík

13 May 2023 32	Viktoria Plzeň	1–3	Sigma Olomouc	Plzeň
15:00 CEST (UTC+2)	Durosinmi 45+3'	Report	Sýkora 45+5' (o.g.); Israel 54'; Navrátil 74'	Stadium: Doosan Arena; Attendance: 7,429; Referee: Marek Radina

20 May 2023 33	Slavia Prague	2–1	Viktoria Plzeň	Prague
18:00 CEST (UTC+2)	Jurečka 5', 69'	Report	Durosinmi 56'	Stadium: Fortuna Arena; Attendance: 15,486; Referee: Miroslav Zelinka

23 May 2023 34	Viktoria Plzeň	0–2	Bohemians 1905	Plzeň
19:00 CEST (UTC+2)		Report	Hála 2'; Hůlka 39'	Stadium: Doosan Arena; Attendance: 7,561; Referee: Jan Všetečka

27 May 2023 35	Sparta Prague	0–1	Viktoria Plzeň	Prague
16:00 CEST (UTC+2)		Report	Vydra 58'	Stadium: epet ARENA; Attendance: 17,593; Referee: Stanislav Volek

=== Czech Cup ===
19 October 2022 Third round	Hlučín	3–2	Viktoria Plzeň	Hlučín
15:00 CEST (UTC+2)		Report	Tijani 74'; Bucha 90'	Stadium: Městský fotbalový stadion Hlučín; Referee: Tomáš Batík

=== UEFA Champions League ===
==== Second qualifying round ====
20 July 2022 First leg	HJK (Finland)	1–2	(Czech Republic) Viktoria Plzeň	Helsinki, Finland
19:00 EEST (UTC+3)	Radulović 50'	Report	Chorý 6' (pen.); Kopic 57'	Stadium: Bolt Arena; Attendance: 5,236; Referee: Nikola Dabanović (Montenegro)

26 July 2022 Second leg	Viktoria Plzeň (Czech Republic)	5–0 (7–1 agg.)	(Finland) HJK	Plzeň, Czech Republic
19:00 CEST (UTC+2)	Pernica 11'; Sýkora 21', 73'; Hejda 31'; Kliment 84'	Report		Stadium: Doosan Arena; Attendance: 10,810; Referee: Aleksandar Stavrev (North Macedonia)
Note: Viktoria Plzeň won 7–1 on aggregate.

==== Third qualifying round ====
2 August 2022 First leg	Sheriff Tiraspol (Moldova)	1–2	(Czech Republic) Viktoria Plzeň	Chișinău, Moldova
20:00 EEST (UTC+3)	Akanbi 36' (pen.)	Report	Chorý 41' (pen.); Bucha 55'	Stadium: Zimbru Stadium; Attendance: 8,153; Referee: Danny Makkelie (Netherlands)

9 August 2022 Second leg	Viktoria Plzeň (Czech Republic)	2–1 (4–2 agg.)	(Moldova) Sheriff Tiraspol	Plzeň, Czech Republic
19:00 CEST (UTC+2)	Kliment 10'; Mosquera 62'	Report	Akanbi 47' (pen.)	Stadium: Doosan Arena; Attendance: 10,770; Referee: Orel Grinfeld (Israel)
Note: Viktoria Plzeň won 4–2 on aggregate.

==== Play-off round ====
17 August 2022 First leg	Qarabağ (Azerbaijan)	0–0	(Czech Republic) Viktoria Plzeň	Baku, Azerbaijan
20:45 AZT (UTC+4)		Report		Stadium: Tofiq Bahramov Republican Stadium; Attendance: 31,150; Referee: Slavko Vinčić (Slovenia)

23 August 2022 Second leg	Viktoria Plzeň (Czech Republic)	2–1 (2–1 agg.)	(Azerbaijan) Qarabağ	Plzeň, Czech Republic
21:00 CEST (UTC+2)	Kopic 58'; Kliment 73'	Report	Ozobić 38'	Stadium: Doosan Arena; Attendance: 10,963; Referee: Artur Soares Dias (Portugal)
Note: Viktoria Plzeň won 2–1 on aggregate.

==== Group stage ====
Pos	Team	Pld	W	D	L	GF	GA	GD	Pts	Qualification	BAY	INT	BAR	PLZ
1	(Germany) Bayern Munich	6	6	0	0	18	2	+16	18	Advance to knockout phase	—	2–0	2–0	5–0
2	(Italy) Inter Milan	6	3	1	2	10	7	+3	10	Advance to knockout phase	0–2	—	1–0	4–0
3	(Spain) Barcelona	6	2	1	3	12	12	0	7	Transfer to Europa League	0–3	3–3	—	5–1
4	(Czech Republic) Viktoria Plzeň	6	0	0	6	5	24	−19	0		2–4	0–2	2–4	—

Source: UEFA
Rules for classification: Group stage tiebreakers

7 September 2022 1	Barcelona (Spain)	5–1	(Czech Republic) Viktoria Plzeň	Barcelona, Spain
21:00 CEST (UTC+2)	Kessié 13'; Lewandowski 34', 45+3', 67'; Torres 71'	Report	Sýkora 44'	Stadium: Camp Nou; Attendance: 77,411; Referee: Lawrence Visser (Belgium)

13 September 2022 2	Viktoria Plzeň (Czech Republic)	0–2	(Italy) Inter Milan	Plzeň, Czech Republic
18:45 CEST (UTC+2)		Report	Džeko 20'; Dumfries 70'	Stadium: Doosan Arena; Attendance: 11,252; Referee: Sandro Schärer (Switzerland)

4 October 2022 3	Bayern Munich (Germany)	5–0	(Czech Republic) Viktoria Plzeň	Munich, Germany
18:45 CEST (UTC+2)	Sané 7', 50'; Gnabry 13'; Mané 21'; Choupo-Moting 59'	Report		Stadium: Allianz Arena; Attendance: 75,000; Referee: Nikola Dabanović (Montenegro)

12 October 2022 4	Viktoria Plzeň (Czech Republic)	2–4	(Germany) Bayern Munich	Plzeň, Czech Republic
21:00 CEST (UTC+2)	Vlkanova 62'; Kliment 75'	Report	Mané 10'; Müller 14'; Goretzka 25', 35'	Stadium: Doosan Arena; Attendance: 11,326; Referee: Bartosz Frankowski (Poland)

26 October 2022 5	Inter Milan (Italy)	4–0	(Czech Republic) Viktoria Plzeň	Milan, Italy
18:45 CEST (UTC+2)	Mkhitaryan 35'; Džeko 42', 66'; Lukaku 87'	Report		Stadium: San Siro; Attendance: 71,849; Referee: Andreas Ekberg (Sweden)

1 November 2022 6	Viktoria Plzeň (Czech Republic)	2–4	(Spain) Barcelona	Plzeň, Czech Republic
21:00 CET (UTC+1)	Chorý 51' (pen.), 63'	Report	Alonso 6'; Torres 44', 54'; Torre 75'	Stadium: Doosan Arena; Attendance: 11,258; Referee: Radu Petrescu (Romania)
