= 2020–21 FC Viktoria Plzeň season =

Viktoria Plzeň
2020–21 season
- President: Adolf Šádek
- Head coach: Adrián Guľa
- Stadium: Doosan Arena
- Czech First League: 5th
- Czech Cup: Runners-up
- UEFA Champions League: Second qualifying round
- UEFA Europa League: Play-off round
- Top goalscorer: League: Jean-David Beauguel (12); All: Jean-David Beauguel (14)
- Highest home attendance: 5,939
- Lowest home attendance: 0
- Average home league attendance: 2,969
Home colours	Away colours	Third colours

The 2020–21 FC Viktoria Plzeň season was the club's 28th season in the Czech First League. The team competed in Czech First League, the Czech Cup, the UEFA Champions League and the UEFA Europa League.

== First team squad ==
As of 17 January 2021.

Note: Flags indicate national team as defined under FIFA eligibility rules; some limited exceptions apply. Players may hold more than one non-FIFA nationality.

No.	Pos.	Nation	Player
2	DF	CZE	Lukáš Hejda
5	MF	COD	Joel Ngandu Kayamba
7	MF	CZE	Tomáš Hořava
8	DF	CZE	David Limberský
9	FW	FRA	Jean-David Beauguel
10	MF	CZE	Jan Kopic
11	DF	CZE	Matěj Hybš
13	FW	CZE	Zdeněk Ondrášek
16	GK	CZE	Aleš Hruška
17	MF	CZE	Ondřej Mihálik
19	MF	CZE	Jan Kovařík
20	MF	CZE	Pavel Bucha
21	MF	CZE	Šimon Falta

No.	Pos.	Nation	Player
22	DF	CZE	Jakub Brabec
23	MF	CZE	Lukáš Kalvach
24	DF	CZE	Milan Havel
25	MF	CZE	Aleš Čermák
26	FW	CZE	Lukáš Matějka
29	GK	CZE	Dominik Sváček
31	MF	CZE	Pavel Šulc
32	DF	CZE	Josef Koželuh
35	DF	CZE	Filip Kaša
36	GK	CZE	Jindřich Staněk
37	DF	CZE	Václav Míka
50	MF	CIV	Adriel Ba Loua
66	MF	SVK	Miroslav Káčer

=== Out on loan ===
Note: Flags indicate national team as defined under FIFA eligibility rules; some limited exceptions apply. Players may hold more than one non-FIFA nationality.

No.	Pos.	Nation	Player
—	FW	CZE	Tomáš Chorý (at Zulte Waregem)
—	DF	CZE	Adam Hloušek (at Kaiserslautern)
—	MF	CZE	Dominik Janošek (at Fastav Zlín)
—	DF	CZE	Radim Řezník (at Mladá Boleslav)
—	MF	CRO	Marko Alvir (at České Budějovice)
—	MF	NGR	Ubong Ekpai (at České Budějovice)
—	DF	CZE	Luděk Pernica (at Zbrojovka Brno)

No.	Pos.	Nation	Player
—	DF	CZE	Šimon Gabriel (at FK Teplice)
—	MF	CZE	Michal Hlavatý (at FK Pardubice)
—	DF	CZE	Filip Čihák (at FK Pardubice)
—	MF	CZE	Lukáš Pfeifer (at FK Pardubice)
—	MF	CZE	Václav Svoboda (at 1. FK Příbram)
—	MF	CZE	Dušan Pinc (at Táborsko)
—	MF	CZE	Jakub Selnar (at Vysočina Jihlava)

== Transfers ==
=== In ===
Date	Pos.	Player	From	Fee
3 August 2020	DF	Filip Kaša	MŠK Žilina	Free
3 August 2020	DF	Matěj Hybš	FC Slovan Liberec	Free
3 August 2020	MF	Miroslav Káčer	MŠK Žilina	Free
3 August 2020	FW	Adriel Ba Loua	MFK Karviná	£788,000
3 August 2020	FW	Ondřej Mihálik	AZ Alkmaar	Undisclosed
3 August 2020	FW	Zdeněk Ondrášek	FC Dallas	Undisclosed

=== Out ===
Date	Pos.	Player	To	Fee
3 August 2020	GK	Roman Hubník	SK Sigma Olomouc	Free
3 August 2020	GK	Jakub Šiman	FK Příbram	Free

== Pre-season and friendlies ==
1 August 2020 Friendly	Viktoria Plzeň	2–0	Dynamo České Budějovice	Luční hora
11:00 CEST (UTC+2)	Káčer 31'; Matějka 61'	Report		Stadium: Stadion Luční ulice Attendance: Behind closed doors

7 August 2020 Friendly	Rheindorf Altach (Austria)	0–1	(Czech Republic) Viktoria Plzeň	Schwaz, Austria
17:00 CEST (UTC+2)		Report	Beauguel 50'	Stadium: Silberstadt-Arena Schwaz; Attendance: Behind closed doors

11 August 2020 Friendly	St. Pölten (Austria)	0–2	(Czech Republic) Viktoria Plzeň	Jenbach, Austria
18:00 CEST (UTC+2)		Report	Brabec 50'; Chorý 90+1'	Stadium: Stadion Jenbach; Attendance: Behind closed doors

14 August 2020 Friendly	Universitatea Craiova (Romania)	0–2	(Czech Republic) Viktoria Plzeň	Schwaz, Austria
16:00 CEST (UTC+3)	Baiaram (yellow card) 76'	Report	Čermák 20'; Alvir 80'	Stadium: Silberstadt-Arena Schwaz; Attendance: Behind closed doors

== Competitions ==
=== Czech First League ===
==== League table ====
Pos	Team	Pld	W	D	L	GF	GA	GD	Pts	Qualification or relegation
3	Jablonec	34	21	6	7	59	33	+26	69	Qualification for the Europa League third qualifying round
4	Slovácko	34	19	6	9	58	33	+25	63	Qualification for the Europa Conference League second qualifying round
5	Viktoria Plzeň	34	17	7	10	60	45	+15	58	Qualification for the Europa Conference League second qualifying round
6	Slovan Liberec	34	14	10	10	44	32	+12	52	
7	Pardubice	34	15	7	12	41	42	−1	52	

Source: Fortuna Liga
Rules for classification: 1) Points; 2) Head-to-head points; 3) Head-to-head goal difference; 4) Head-to-head goals scored; 5) Goal difference; 6) Goals scored; 7) Fair-play ranking; 8) Draw.

==== Results summary ====
Overall								Home						Away					
Pld	W	D	L	GF	GA	GD	Pts	W	D	L	GF	GA	GD	W	D	L	GF	GA	GD
34	17	7	10	60	45	+15	58	12	2	3	39	15	+24	5	5	7	21	30	−9

Last updated: See results.
Source: Fortuna Liga

==== Results by round ====
Round	1	2	3	4	5	6	7	8	9	10	11	12	13	14	15	16	17	18	19	20	21	22	23	24	25	26	27	28	29	30	31	32	33	34
Ground	H	A	H	A	H	A	H	A	A	H	A	H	A	H	A	H	A	H	A	H	A	H	A	H	H	A	H	A	H	A	H	A	H	A
Result	W	L	W	W	W	D	W	L	D	L	L	W	L	L	D	W	W	L	D	W	W	W	L	W	W	D	D	W	W	L	D	L	W	W
Position	5	11	8	3	3	3	3	4	4	4	6	5	5	9	9	7	5	8	8	6	6	6	6	6	5	5	5	5	5	5	5	5	5	5

Source: See results
A = Away; H = Home; W = Win; D = Draw; L = Loss

==== Matches ====
21 August 2020 1	Viktoria Plzeň	3–1	Opava	Plzeň
18:00 CEST (UTC+2)	Bucha 45' (pen.); Beauguel 55'; Ba Loua 76'	Report	Mondek (yellow card) 30'; Helešic 44'; Hrabina (red card) 45'	Stadium: Doosan Arena; Attendance: 2,813; Referee: Alex Denev

30 August 2020 2	Slovan Liberec	4–1	Viktoria Plzeň	Liberec
16:30 CEST (UTC+2)	Mosquera 4', 55', (yellow card) 33'; Helal 11'; Hromada 14'; Matoušek (yellow card) 75'; Rabušic (yellow card) 76'	Report	Čermák 34' (pen.), (yellow card) 39'; Mihálik (yellow card) 45'; Havel (yellow card) 57'; Hořava (yellow card) 72'; Hejda (yellow card) 78'; Bucha (yellow card) 80'	Stadium: Stadion u Nisy; Attendance: 2,488; Referee: Pavel Franek

13 September 2020 3	Viktoria Plzeň	2–1	Mladá Boleslav	Plzeň
19:00 CEST (UTC+2)	Beauguel 21'; Káčer (yellow card) 64'; Hejda 74'	Report	Mašek 32'; Tatayev (yellow card) 62'; Túlio (yellow card) 68'	Stadium: Doosan Arena; Attendance: 5,939; Referee: Pavel Orel

19 September 2020 4	Bohemians	1–4	Viktoria Plzeň	Prague
19:00 CEST (UTC+2)	Vacek (yellow card) 38'; Vaníček 86'	Report	Ondrášek 30'; Ba Loua 33'; Hejda (yellow card) 68'; Kopic 73'; Kalvach (yellow card) 77'; Beauguel 85'	Stadium: Ďolíček; Attendance: 3,089; Referee: Pavel Julínek

27 September 2020 5	Viktoria Plzeň	4–1	Zbrojovka Brno	Plzeň
15:30 CEST (UTC+2)	Čermák 2'; Kopic 44'; Beauguel 56' (pen.); Hořava 71'	Report	Hladík 68'; Přichystal (yellow card) 90'	Stadium: Doosan Arena; Attendance: 1,911; Referee: Ondřej Ginzel

4 October 2020 6	Sigma Olomouc	2–2	Viktoria Plzeň	Olomouc
15:30 CEST (UTC+2)	Hála 13'; Hubník (yellow card) 62'; Breite (yellow card) 66'; Falta 70'	Report	Ondrášek 17'; Čermák 63' (pen.); Mihálik (yellow card) 86'	Stadium: Andrův stadion Attendance: 2,000; Referee: Petr Ardeleánu

8 November 2020 7	Viktoria Plzeň	3–1	Sparta Prague	Plzeň
18:15 CET (UTC+1)	Bucha 7'; Čermák (yellow card) 26'; Ondrášek 34'; Hejda 45+1'; Kalvach (yellow card) 74'; Bucha (penalty missed); Káčer (yellow card) 90+1'	Report	Plechatý (yellow card) 16'; Krejčí (yellow card) 36'; Sáček (yellow card) 57'; Vindheim (yellow card) 81'; Krejčí 90+3'	Stadium: Doosan Arena; Attendance: 0 Referee: Pavel Franek

22 November 2020 8	Fastav Zlín	1–0	Viktoria Plzeň	Zlín
16:00 CET (UTC+1)	Poznar 38'	Report	Marko Alvir (yellow card) 79'; Kayamba (yellow card) 90'	Stadium: Letná Stadion; Attendance: 0 Referee: Alex Denev

28 November 2020 9	Dynamo České Budějovice	0–0	Viktoria Plzeň	České Budějovice
18:30 CET (UTC+1)	Novák (yellow card) 49'	Report	Brabec (yellow card) 90+1'	Stadium: Stadion Střelecký ostrov Attendance: 0 Referee: Ondřej Berka

5 December 2020 10	Viktoria Plzeň	0–1	Karviná	Plzeň
18:30 CET (UTC+1)	Pernica (yellow card) 87'	Report	Papadopulos 38'; Guba (yellow card) 80'	Stadium: Doosan Arena; Attendance: 0 Referee: Petr Hocek

12 December 2020 11	Jablonec	3–2	Viktoria Plzeň	Jablonec
18:30 CET (UTC+1)	Schranz (yellow card) 23'; Martinec (yellow card) 29'; Doležal 58'; Zelený 66'; Ladra 77'; Kubista (yellow card) 79'	Report	Bucha 12'; Beauguel 45+1'; Čermák (yellow card) 56'; Havel (yellow card) 71'; Káčer (yellow card) 90+3'	Stadium: Stadion Střelnice; Attendance: 0 Referee: Karel Hrubes

15 December 2020 12	Viktoria Plzeň	7–0	Teplice	Plzeň
18:00 CET (UTC+1)	Beauguel 23'; Ba Loua 32'; Čermák 45+2', 56', 70'; Limberský 73'; Bucha 84'	Report	Mareš (yellow card) 54'; Hošek (red card) 63'; Fortelný (yellow card) 82'; Kozák (yellow card) 89'	Stadium: Doosan Arena; Attendance: 0 Referee: Ondřej Berka

20 December 2020 13	Slovácko	4–0	Viktoria Plzeň	Uherské Hradiště
17:00 CET (UTC+1)	Kalabiška 11', (yellow card) 71'; Hofmann 50'; Kohút (yellow card) 70'; Kubala (yellow card) 72', (goal) 90'; Sadílek 80'	Report	Havel (yellow card) 34' (yellow-red card) 79'	Stadium: Městský fotbalový stadion Miroslava Valenty; Attendance: 0 Referee: Ondřej Ginzel

23 December 2020 14	Viktoria Plzeň	0–1	Slavia Prague	Plzeň
18:00 CET (UTC+1)	Bucha (yellow card) 13'; Kalvach (yellow card) 39'; Alvir (yellow card) 86'; Limberský (yellow card) 87'; Hejda (yellow card) 90+4'	Report	Stanciu 26'; Bořil (yellow card) 51'; Provod (yellow card) 55'; Masopust (yellow card) 84'	Stadium: Doosan Arena; Attendance: 0 Referee: Ondřej Pechanec

17 January 2021 15	Příbram	0–0	Viktoria Plzeň	Příbram
16:00 CET (UTC+1)	Pilík (yellow card) 57'	Report	Ondrášek (yellow card) 66'; Čermák (yellow card) 76', (penalty missed) 87'	Stadium: Na Litavce; Attendance: 0 Referee: Pavel Orel

24 January 2021 16	Viktoria Plzeň	2–0	Pardubice	Plzeň
16:00 CET (UTC+1)	Havel 78'; Bucha 90'	Report	Šejvl (red card) 30'	Stadium: Doosan Arena; Attendance: 0 Referee: Ondřej Berka

31 January 2021 17	Baník Ostrava	0–2	Viktoria Plzeň	Ostrava
16:00 CET (UTC+1)	Dyjan (yellow card) 45+2'	Rport	Šulc (yellow card) 42'; Ondrášek 65'; Stronati 86' (o.g.); Havel (yellow card) 88'	Stadium: Městský stadion Attendance: 0 Referee: Zbynek Proske

6 February 2021 18	Viktoria Plzeň	0–2	Slovan Liberec	Plzeň
18:30 CET (UTC+1)	Ba Loua (yellow card) 23'; Kaša (red card) 42'; Ondrášek (yellow card) 53'	Report	Koscelník (yellow card) 29'; Rondić 52'; Mara (yellow card) 66'; Karafiát (yellow card) 89'; Fukala (yellow card) 90'; Pešek 90+3'	Stadium: Doosan Arena; Attendance: 0 Referee: Miroslav Zelinka

14 February 2021 19	Mladá Boleslav	2–2	Viktoria Plzeň	Mladá Boleslav
14:00 CET (UTC+1)	Ladra 22'; Dancák (yellow card) 54'; Škoda 58'; Takács (yellow card) 80'	Report	Šulc 4', (yellow card) 66'; Limberský (yellow card) 47'; Matějka 86'; Mihálik (yellow card) 87'; Kayamba (yellow card) 90+2'	Stadium: Lokotrans Aréna; Attendance: 0 Referee: Pavel Franek

21 February 2021 20	Viktoria Plzeň	3–1	Bohemians	Plzeň
14:00 CET (UTC+1)	Kayamba 43'; Bucha 61'; Beauguel 65' (pen.); Kalvach (yellow card) 89'; Kaša (yellow card) 90+1'	Report	Jindřišek (penalty missed); Levin (yellow card) 86'; Pulkrab 87'	Stadium: Doosan Arena; Attendance: 0 Referee: Ondrej Ginzel

27 February 2021 21	Zbrojovka Brno	0–1	Viktoria Plzeň	Brno
18:30 CET (UTC+1)	Zahumensky (yellow card) 47'	Report	Čermák (yellow card) 41'; Beauguel 68'	Stadium: Wedos Arena; Attendance: 0 Referee: Pavel Orel

6 March 2021 22	Viktoria Plzeň	1–0	Sigma Olomouc	Plzeň
18:30 CET (UTC+1)	Kaša (yellow card) 42'; Beauguel 57'; Limberský (yellow card) 84'; Falta (yellow card) 90'	Report	Poulolo (yellow card) 24'; Chytil (yellow card) 90+3'	Stadium: Doosan Arena; Attendance: 0 Referee: Ondřej Berka

4 April 2021 25	Viktoria Plzeň	2–1	Dynamo České Budějovice	Plzeň
16:00 CEST (UTC+2)	Kalvach 29'; Falta 56'	Report	Talovierov (yellow card) 32'; Novák 45+1'; Vais (yellow card) 77'	Stadium: Doosan Arena; Attendance: 0 Referee: Karel Hrubeš

10 April 2021 26	Karviná	1–1	Viktoria Plzeň	Karviná
14:00 CEST (UTC+2)	Papadopulos 13'; Mazáň (yellow card) 21'; Čmelík (yellow card) 35'	Report	Beauguel 52'; Kovařík (yellow card) 90+2'	Stadium: Městský stadion Attendance: 0 Referee: Petr Hocek

14 April 2021 24	Viktoria Plzeň	2–0	Fastav Zlín	Plzeň
16:00 CEST (UTC+2)	Kaša (yellow card) 26'; Beauguel 31'; Ba Loua 53'	Report	Matejov (yellow card) 38'; Janetzký (yellow card) 64'	Stadium: Doosan Arena; Attendance: 0 Referee: Ondřej Lerch

17 April 2021 27	Viktoria Plzeň	1–1	Jablonec	Plzeň
18:30 CEST (UTC+2)	Ba Loua 41'; Limberský (yellow card) 62'; Káčer (yellow card) 68'	Report	Krob (yellow card) 25'; Zeleny (yellow card) 59'; Schranz 70'	Stadium: Doosan Arena; Attendance: 0 Referee: Pavel Franek

21 April 2021 28	Teplice	0–1	Viktoria Plzeň	Teplice
15:00 CEST (UTC+2)	Moulis (yellow card) 85'	Report	Kaša 61'; Havel (yellow card) 83'	Stadium: Na Stínadlech; Attendance: 0 Referee: Emanuel Marek

24 April 2021 29	Viktoria Plzeň	2–1	Slovácko	Plzeň
18:30 CEST (UTC+2)	Ba Loua 14', (yellow card) 80'; Limberský (yellow card) 37'; Kalvach 73'; Káčer (yellow card) 90+2'; Staněk (yellow card) 90+3'	Report	Kliment (yellow card) 70'	Stadium: Doosan Arena; Attendance: 0 Referee: Karel Hrubes

2 May 2021 30	Slavia Prague	5–1	Viktoria Plzeň	Prague
19:30 CEST (UTC+2)	Holeš 6'; Deli (penalty missed) 15'; Kaša 22' (o.g.); Van Buren 47'; Bah 72'; Stanciu 84'	Report	Staněk (yellow card) 14'; Beauguel (yellow card) 50'; Mihálik (yellow card) 58'; Káčer 67'	Stadium: Sinobo Stadium; Attendance: 1,486; Referee: Ondřej Berka

8 May 2021 31	Viktoria Plzeň	3–3	Příbram	Plzeň
17:00 CEST (UTC+2)	Beauguel 45+5'; Brabec (yellow card) 65', (goal) 71'; Ondrášek 90+1'	Report	Pilík 14', (yellow card) 17'; Nový 23'; Kingue (yellow card) 66'; Kočí (yellow card) 79'; Tregler (yellow card) 88'; Zorvan 90+6'	Stadium: Doosan Arena; Attendance: 853; Referee: Ondrej Ginzel

12 May 2021 23	Sparta Prague	3–1	Viktoria Plzeň	Prague
18:00 CEST (UTC+2)	Hložek 62'; Hancko 85' (pen.); Karabec 90+3'	Report	Brabec 11', (yellow card) 44'; Mihálik (yellow card) 27'; Káčer (yellow card) 67'	Stadium: Stadion Letná; Attendance: 0 Referee: Ondrej Pechanec

16 May 2021 32	Pardubice	3–0	Viktoria Plzeň	Prague
15:00 CEST (UTC+2)	Ewerton (yellow card) 24'; Cadu 44'; Černý 67'; Surzyn 88'	Report	Kaša (yellow card) 28', (red card) 45+3'	Stadium: Ďolíček; Attendance: 259; Referee: Pavel Julínek

23 May 2021 33	Viktoria Plzeň	4–0	Baník Ostrava	Plzeň
17:00 CEST (UTC+2)	Hejda 30'; Brabec 51'; Bucha (yellow card) 62'; Kalvach (yellow card) 78'; Ondrášek 82'; Ba Loua 88'	Report	Buchta (yellow card) 5'; Jánoš (yellow card) 19'; Laštůvka (yellow card) 30'	Stadium: Doosan Arena; Attendance: 1,973; Referee: Emanuel Marek

29 May 2021 34	Opava	1–3	Viktoria Plzeň	Opava
17:00 CEST (UTC+2)	Nešický 39'; Hnaníček (yellow card) 45+2'; Hellebrand (yellow card) 67'	Report	Čermák 13'; Bucha 34'; Havel 43'; Hybš (yellow card) 84'; Ba Loua (yellow card) 90+3'	Stadium: Stadion v Městských sadech Attendance: 622; Referee: Ondřej Lerch

=== Czech Cup ===
10 February 2021 Third round	Viktoria Plzeň	7–0	Přepeře	Plzeň
16:00 CET (UTC+1)	Bucha 18', 34'; Kalvach 20'; Beauguel 23', 58', (yellow card) 75'; Matějka 44', 89'	Report	Sedláček (yellow card) 6'	Stadium: Doosan Arena; Attendance: 0 Referee: Jan Petřík

2 March 2021 Fourth round	Viktoria Plzeň	3–1	Hradec Králové	Plzeň
14:00 CET (UTC+1)	Čermák 13', 41', 56'	Report	Dvořák 74'	Stadium: Doosan Arena; Attendance: 0 Referee: Petr Hocek

7 April 2021 Quarter-finals	Viktoria Plzeň	1–0	Slovan Liberec	Plzeň
15:30 CEST (UTC+2)	Brabec (yellow card) 28'; Ba Loua (yellow card) 57'; Mihálik 87'	Report	Cancola (yellow card) 38'; Pešek (yellow card) 55'; Mikula (yellow card) 85'; Matoušek (yellow card) 88'	Stadium: Doosan Arena; Attendance: 0 Referee: Pavel Julínek

28 April 2021 Semi-finals	Viktoria Plzeň	1–0	Teplice	Plzeň
17:00 CEST (UTC+2)	Kopic (yellow card) 72'; Havel 76'	Report	Mareček (yellow card) 88'	Stadium: Doosan Arena; Attendance: 0 Referee: Pavel Orel

20 May 2021 Final	Viktoria Plzeň	0–1	Slavia Prague	Plzeň
17:00 CEST (UTC+2)	Havel (yellow card) 36' (yellow-red card) 54'; Ondrášek (yellow card) 89'; Hejda (yellow card) 90+2'	Report	Masopust (yellow card) 39'; Sima 73'; Kolář (yellow card) 90+1'	Stadium: Doosan Arena; Attendance: 1,167; Referee: Roman Hrubes

=== UEFA Champions League ===
==== Qualifying rounds ====
26 August 2020 Second qualifying round	AZ (Netherlands)	3–1 (a.e.t.)	(Czech Republic) Viktoria Plzeň	Alkmaar, Netherlands
16:30 CEST (UTC+2)	Leeuwin (yellow card) 76'; Koopmeiners 90+5' (pen.); Guðmundsson 98', 118'; Druijf (yellow card) 106'; Boadu (yellow card) 110'; Wijndal (yellow card) 112'	Report	Hejda (yellow card) 52'; Limberský 78'; Hruška (yellow card) 84'	Stadium: AFAS Stadion; Attendance: 0 Referee: Luís Godinho (Portugal)

=== UEFA Europa League ===
==== Qualifying rounds ====
24 September 2020 Third qualifying round	Viktoria Plzeň (Czech Republic)	3–0	(Denmark) SønderjyskE	Plzeň, Czech Republic
18:00 CEST (UTC+2)	Ondrášek 35' (pen.); Ba Loua 41'; Káčer 51', (yellow card) 90+2'	Report	Absalonsen (yellow card) 35'; Ekani (yellow card) 56'; Bah (yellow card) 70'	Stadium: Doosan Arena; Attendance: 0 Referee: Donatas Rumšas (Lithuania)

1 October 2020 Play-off round	Hapoel Be'er Sheva (Israel)	1–0	(Czech Republic) Viktoria Plzeň	Petah Tikva, Israel
19:30 CEST (UTC+2)	Josué 4' (pen.); Kabha (yellow card) 82'; Dadia (yellow card) 85'; Levita (yellow card) 90+2'	Report	Hruška (yellow card) 3'; Hejda (yellow card) 40'	Stadium: HaMoshava Stadium; Attendance: 0 Referee: Srđan Jovanović (Serbia)

== Squad statistics ==
=== Appearances and goals ===
No.	Nat.	Player	Czech First League		MOL Cup		Champions League		Europa League		TOTAL	
No.	Nat.	Player	Apps	Goals	Apps	Goals	Apps	Goals	Apps	Goals	Apps	Goals
Goalkeeper
16	(Czech Republic)	Aleš Hruška	15	0	0	0	3	0	2	0	20	0
29	(Czech Republic)	Dominik Sváček	0	0	0	0	0	0	0	0	0	0
36	(Czech Republic)	Jindřich Staněk	0	0	0	0	0	0	0	0	0	0
Defender
2	(Czech Republic)	Lukáš Hejda	18(2)	2	0	0	1	0	2	0	21(2)	3
22	(Czech Republic)	Jakub Brabec	31	0	0	0	5	0	2	0	38	3
44	(Czech Republic)	Luděk Pernica	4	0	0	0	0(1)	0	0(1)	0	4(2)	0
–	(Czech Republic)	Filip Kaša	16(2)	0	3	0	0	0	0	0	19(2)	1
8	(Czech Republic)	David Limberský	23	1	0	0	1	1	2	0	26	2
–	(Czech Republic)	Václav Míka	2	0	0	0	0	0	0	0	2	0
11	(Czech Republic)	Matěj Hybš	5(1)	0	2(2)	0	0	0	0	0	7(3)	0
14	(Czech Republic)	Radim Řezník	6(1)	0	0	0	0	0	0	0	6(1)	0
24	(Czech Republic)	Milan Havel	25(1)	2	5	0	1	0	0	0	31(1)	2
–	(Czech Republic)	Josef Kozeluh	0	0	0(2)	0	0	0	0	0	0(2)	0
Midfielder
23	(Czech Republic)	Lukáš Kalvach	33	2	0	5	1	0	2	0	40	3
20	(Czech Republic)	Pavel Bucha	23(3)	7	0	4	1	0	1(1)	0	27(4)	8
7	(Czech Republic)	Tomáš Hořava	1(8)	1	0(1)	0	0	0	0	0	1(9)	1
66	(Slovakia)	Miroslav Káčer	3(7)	0	0	0	0(1)	0	1	1	3(8)	1
77	(Croatia)	Marko Alvir	0(9)	0	0	0	0	0	0	0	0(9)	0
10	(Czech Republic)	Jan Kopic	12(4)	2	0(1)	0	1	0	2	0	14(5)	2
19	(Czech Republic)	Jan Kovařík	7(9)	0	0	0	0(1)	0	0	0	7(5)	0
21	(Czech Republic)	Šimon Falta	17(2)	1	5	0	0	0	0	0	17(2)	1
25	(Czech Republic)	Aleš Čermák	22(3)	7	2(1)	3	1	0	2	0	27(4)	10
31	(Czech Republic)	Pavel Šulc	20(4)	1	3(2)	0	0	0	0	0	23(5)	1
Forward
5	(Democratic Republic of the Congo)	Joel Ngandu Kayamba	19(8)	1	1(2)	0	0	0	0(2)	0	20(12)	1
50	(Ivory Coast)	Adriel Ba Loua	21(10)	7	4(1)	0	0(1)	0	2	1	25(11)	8
13	(France)	Zdeněk Ondrášek	15(16)	6	1(2)	0	0	0	2	1	16(18)	7
9	(France)	Jean-David Beauguel	17(13)	12	4(1)	2	1	0	0(2)	0	22(16)	14
15	(Czech Republic)	Tomáš Chorý	1(1)	0	0	0	0	0	0	0	1(1)	0
26	(Czech Republic)	Lukáš Matějka	0(8)	1	1	3	0	0	0	0	0(8)	4
37	(Czech Republic)	Ondřej Mihálik	3(19)	0	1(4)	1	1	0	0	0	5(23)	1

=== Goal scorers ===
No.	Position	Name	Czech First League	Cup	UEFA Champions League	UEFA Europa League	Total
1	FW	Jean-David Beauguel	8	2	0	0	10
2	MF	Adriel Ba Loua	6	0	0	1	7
3	FW	Aleš Čermák	6	0	0	0	6
3	MF	Pavel Bucha	4	2	0	0	6
5	FW	Zdeněk Ondrášek	4	0	0	1	5
6	MF	Lukáš Kalvach	2	1	0	0	3
7	DF	David Limberský	1	0	1	0	2
7	DF	Lukáš Hejda	2	0	0	0	2
9	MF	Jan Kopic	1	0	0	0	1
9	MF	Tomáš Hořava	1	0	0	0	1
9	MF	Milan Havel	1	0	0	0	1
9	MF	Miroslav Káčer	0	0	0	1	1
9	MF	Pavel Šulc	1	0	0	0	1
9	MF	Lukáš Matějka	1	0	0	0	1
9	MF	Šimon Falta	1	0	0	0	1
9	MF	Ondřej Mihálik	0	1	0	0	1
TOTAL			39	6	1	3	49

=== Assists ===
No.	Position	Name	Czech First League	Cup	UEFA Champions League	UEFA Europa League	Total
1	FW	Adriel Ba Loua	4	0	0	0	4
2	MF	Jan Kopic	0	0	1	2	3
3	DF	David Limberský	2	0	0	0	2
3	MF	Miroslav Káčer	2	0	0	0	2
3	MF	Pavel Šulc	1	0	0	0	1
3	MF	Jan Kopic	0	0	0	2	2
7	MF	Aleš Čermák	1	0	0	0	1
7	FW	Zdeněk Ondrášek	1	0	0	0	1
TOTAL			14	0	1	2	17

=== Clean sheets ===
No.	Squad number	Position	Name	Czech First League	Cup	UEFA Champions League	UEFA Europa League	Total
1	16	GK	Aleš Hruška	5	2	0	0	7
TOTAL				5	2	0	0	7
