= Adriel Ba Loua =

Ivorian association football player

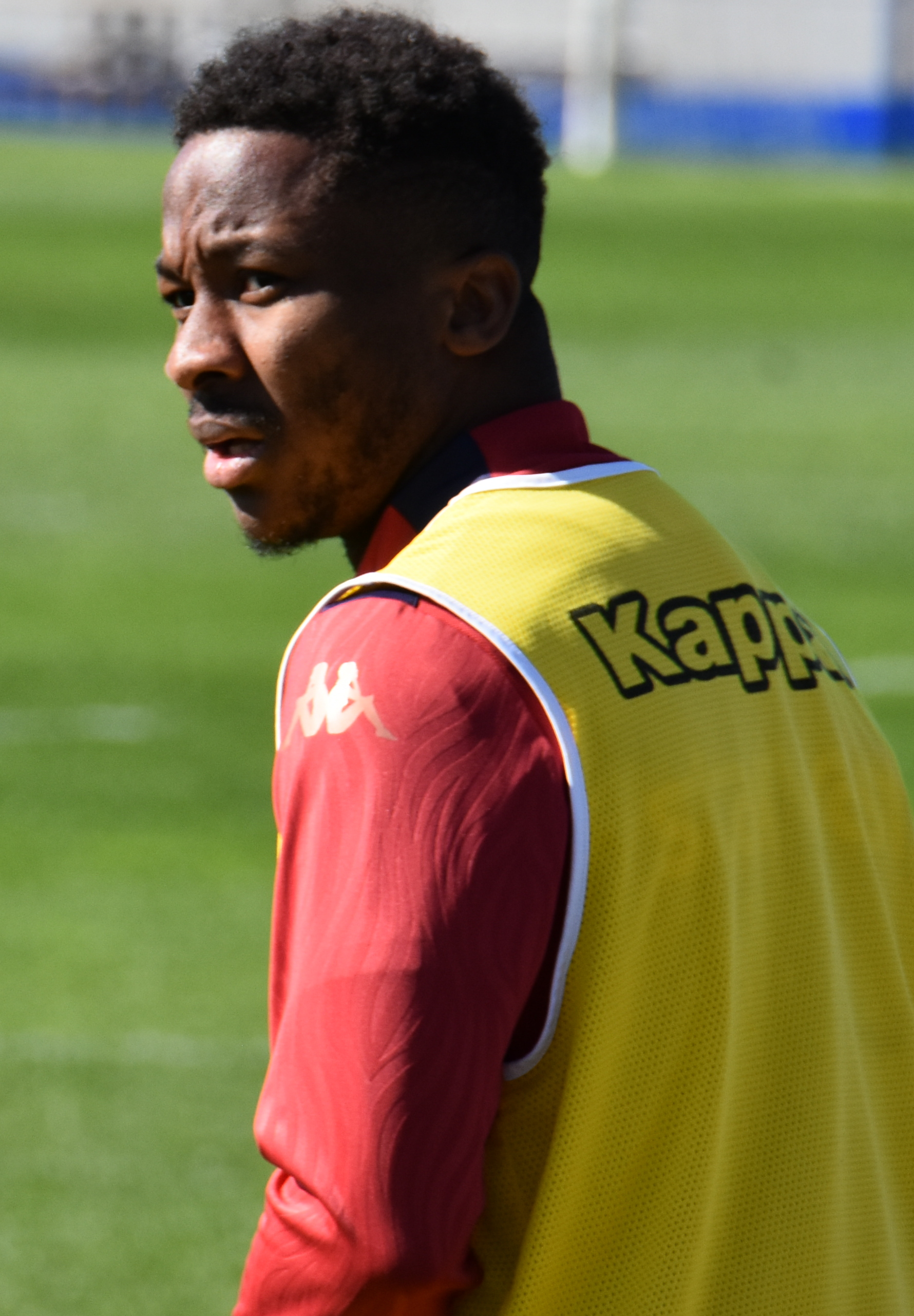
- Adriel Ba Loua with Caen in 2025

Personal information
- Full name: Adriel D'Avila Ba Loua
- Date of birth: 25 July 1996 (age 30)
- Place of birth: Yopougon, Ivory Coast
- Height: 1.70 m (5 ft 7 in)
- Position: Winger

Team information
- Current team: Gwangju
- Number: 50

Youth career
- 2001–2013: ASEC Mimosas

Senior career*
| Years | Team | Apps | (Gls) |
| 2013–2019 | ASEC Mimosas | | |
| 2015–2016 | → Lille OSC (loan) | 0 | (0) |
| 2017–2018 | → Vejle Boldklub (loan) | 52 | (6) |
| 2018–2019 | → MFK Karviná (loan) | 27 | (2) |
| 2019–2020 | MFK Karviná | 27 | (1) |
| 2020–2021 | Viktoria Plzeň | 35 | (7) |
| 2021–2025 | Lech Poznań | 77 | (5) |
| 2025 | Caen | 6 | (0) |
| 2025 | Caen B | 1 | (1) |
| 2025–2026 | Gabala | 30 | (4) |
| 2026– | Gwangju | 15 | (2) |

International career
| 2015 | Ivory Coast U20 | 3 | (0) |
- * Club domestic league appearances and goals as of 21:27, 14 October 2026 (UTC)

Adriel D'Avila Ba Loua (born 25 July 1996) is an Ivorian professional footballer who plays as a winger for K League 1 club Gwangju.

== Career ==
=== Early career ===
Ba Loua began his career in the club ASEC Mimosas in the Abidjan city of Côte d'Ivoire. Ba Loua starred at the youth department as 11 years old and joined the first-team squad as 16-year-old. He got two seasons at the club's first team.

=== Lille ===
In the summer of 2015, Hervé Renard entrusted him to the French club Lille on a lease agreement. Renard was at the forefront of the Ivory Coast national team before he was coached in Lille in the summer of 2015. Renard was fired after thirteen matches for the French club, and the new coach did not see the same potential in Ba Loua.

=== Vejle Boldklub ===
In the summer of 2016, Ba Loua changed to Vejle Boldklub. The offensive player was one of many new faces in the Jutland tradition club, which this summer was bought by Andrei Zolotko. Ba Loua in his first half season in the club played all matches in 1. Division. After the winter break, he lost his fixed place, but missed only three matches this season. He left the club after two seasons.

=== Gabala ===
On 12 July 2025, Azerbaijan Premier League club Gabala announced the signing of Ba Loua from Caen, to a one-year contract. On 10 June 2026, Gabala announced that Ba Loua had left the club after his contract had expired.

=== Gwangju ===
On 3 July 2026, K League 1 club Gwangju announced the signing of Ba Loua.

== International career ==
Ba Loua is quoted for U-20 international championships for the Ivory Coast. He has also been represented in the U-23 national team at the Vejle Boldklub.

== Career statistics ==
As of match played 11 October 2026

Appearances and goals by club, season and competition
| Club | Season | League | | | National cup (Note: Includes Danish Cup, Czech Cup, Polish Cup, Azerbaijan Cup, Korea Cup) | | Continental | | Other | | Total | |
| Club | Season | Division | Apps | Goals | Apps | Goals | Apps | Goals | Apps | Goals | Apps | Goals |
|---|---|---|---|---|---|---|---|---|---|---|---|---|
| Vejle Boldklub (loan) | 2016–17 | Danish 1st Division | 30 | 4 | 1 | 0 | — | | — | | 31 | 4 |
| Vejle Boldklub (loan) | 2017–18 | Danish 1st Division | 22 | 2 | 2 | 0 | — | | — | | 24 | 2 |
| Vejle Boldklub (loan) | Total | | 52 | 6 | 3 | 0 | — | | — | | 55 | 6 |
| Karviná | 2018–19 | Czech First League | 27 | 2 | 3 | 1 | — | | — | | 30 | 3 |
| Karviná | 2019–20 | Czech First League | 27 | 1 | 0 | 0 | — | | — | | 27 | 1 |
| Karviná | Total | | 54 | 3 | 3 | 1 | — | | — | | 57 | 4 |
| Viktoria Plzeň | 2020–21 | Czech First League | 31 | 7 | 5 | 0 | 3 (Note: One appearance in UEFA Champions League, two appearances and one goal in UEFA Europa League) | 1 | — | | 39 | 8 |
| Viktoria Plzeň | 2021–22 | Czech First League | 4 | 0 | 0 | 0 | 6 (Note: Appearances in UEFA Europa Conference League) | 1 | — | | 10 | 1 |
| Viktoria Plzeň | Total | | 35 | 7 | 5 | 0 | 9 | 2 | — | | 49 | 9 |
| Lech Poznań | 2021–22 | Ekstraklasa | 25 | 1 | 4 | 0 | — | | — | | 29 | 1 |
| Lech Poznań | 2022–23 | Ekstraklasa | 20 | 0 | 1 | 0 | 6 (Note: One appearance in UEFA Champions League, five appearances in UEFA Europa Conference League) | 0 | 1 (Note: Appearance in Polish Super Cup) | 0 | 28 | 0 |
| Lech Poznań | 2023–24 | Ekstraklasa | 25 | 4 | 1 | 0 | 1 | 1 | — | | 27 | 5 |
| Lech Poznań | 2024–25 | Ekstraklasa | 7 | 0 | 0 | 0 | — | | — | | 7 | 0 |
| Lech Poznań | Total | | 77 | 5 | 6 | 0 | 7 | 1 | 1 | 0 | 91 | 6 |
| Lech Poznań II | 2022–23 | II liga | 1 | 0 | 0 | 0 | — | | — | | 1 | 0 |
| Caen | 2024–25 | Ligue 2 | 6 | 0 | — | | — | | — | | 6 | 0 |
| Caen B | 2024–25 | Championnat National 3 | 1 | 1 | — | | — | | — | | 1 | 1 |
| Gabala | 2025–26 | Azerbaijan Premier League | 30 | 4 | 4 | 0 | — | | 1 (Note: Appearance in Azerbaijan Premier League relegation play-off) | 0 | 35 | 4 |
| Gwangju | 2026 | K League 1 | 15 | 2 | 1 | 1 | — | | — | | 16 | 3 |
| Career total | | | 271 | 28 | 22 | 2 | 16 | 3 | 2 | 0 | 311 | 33 |

== Honours ==
Viktoria Plzeň

- Czech First League: 2022-2023

Lech Poznań

- Ekstraklasa: 2021–22
