= Tomáš Chorý =

Czech footballer (born 1995)

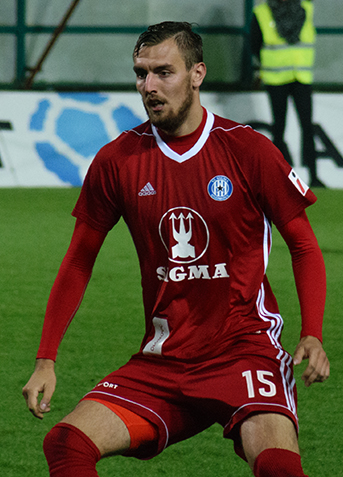
- Chorý with Sigma Olomouc in 2017

Personal information
- Date of birth: 26 January 1995 (age 31)
- Place of birth: Olomouc, Czech Republic
- Height: 1.99 m (6 ft 6 in)
- Position: Forward

Team information
- Current team: Slavia Prague
- Number: 25

Youth career
- 2001–2004: Hanácká Slavia Kroměříž
- 2004–2014: Sigma Olomouc

Senior career*
| Years | Team | Apps | (Gls) |
| 2014–2018 | Sigma Olomouc | 80 | (24) |
| 2018–2024 | Viktoria Plzeň | 170 | (44) |
| 2020–2021 | → Zulte Waregem (loan) | 16 | (4) |
| 2024– | Slavia Prague | 64 | (36) |

International career^{‡}
| 2010–2011 | Czech Republic U16 | 8 | (2) |
| 2011–2012 | Czech Republic U17 | 16 | (3) |
| 2013 | Czech Republic U18 | 3 | (0) |
| 2012–2014 | Czech Republic U19 | 9 | (0) |
| 2014–2016 | Czech Republic U20 | 6 | (0) |
| 2015–2017 | Czech Republic U21 | 7 | (1) |
| 2016 | Czech Republic U23 | 3 | (0) |
| 2023– | Czech Republic | 24 | (7) |
- * Club domestic league appearances and goals as of 17:02, 17 October 2026 (UTC) ‡ National team caps and goals as of 08:25, 25 June 2026 (UTC)

Tomáš Chorý (born 26 January 1995) is a Czech professional footballer who plays as a forward for Slavia Prague and the Czech Republic national team.

== Club career ==
Chorý joined Viktoria Plzeň in the 2018 summer transfer window. He scored two goals in a 2022–23 UEFA Champions League group stage match against Barcelona. Chorý won his second title in the 2021–22 Czech First League on 15 May 2022. In April 2024, he signed a contract with Viktoria Plzeň until 2027.

On 5 October 2020, Chorý went on loan to Belgian club Zulte-Waregem, scoring four goals at the 2020–21 Belgian First Division A.

On 3 July 2024, Chorý signed a contract with Slavia Prague until 30 June 2027.

== Disciplinary problems ==
On 7 August 2025, Chorý was banned by the LFA Disciplinary commission for six matches after he hit goalkeeper Milan Heča in the crotch in the away match against Slovácko.

On 12 April 2026, in the home goalless draw with Viktoria Plzeň, Chorý received a yellow card after a tackle with Sampson Dweh. The yellow card was changed to a red card after VAR intervention, when Chorý immediately afterwards allegedly spat at Dweh while yelling at him. After the match, Chorý admitted that he had yelled at Dweh but denied spitting at him. Slavia manager Jindřich Trpišovský said he had not seen any spitting. Slavia filed a complaint in protest against the verdict. On 16 April 2026, Slavia chairman Jaroslav Tvrdík personally defended Chorý in front of the LFA Disciplinary commission. As a verdict, Chorý was banned for one match, and the disciplinary commission ruled that there had not been any intentional spitting.

On 9 May 2026 in the Prague derby, Chorý received a yellow card after he elbowed Sparta defender Asger Sørensen in the head. The yellow card was changed to a red card after VAR intervention. Slavia chairman Jaroslav Tvrdík criticized Chorý for being unable to control his behavior, and stated that he had been removed from the first team and would not play for Slavia again. On 14 May 2026, Chorý was banned by the LFA Disciplinary commission for six matches. On 23 July 2026, Tvrdík stated at the pre-season press conference that Slavia's owner Pavel Tykač ordered Chorý to return to the A team. Manager Trpišovský, captain Tomáš Holeš and midfielder Lukáš Provod supported Tykač's decision.

On 17 October 2026, in the home goalless draw with Hradec Králové, Chorý received a straight red card for showing the middle finger to the referee. Trpišovský stated at a press conference that Chorý would not play for Slavia again. Four days later, Slavia announced that they had fined Chorý one month's salary, removed him from the first team until the end of the fall season, and that he could leave the club in the winter. In response, Chorý stated that he respected the club's decision and suggested that they could terminate his contract by mutual agreement immediately. He also apologized for his behavior. On 22 October, Chorý was banned by the LFA Disciplinary commission for six matches.

== International career ==
Chorý debuted for the Czech Republic senior team on 20 November 2023 in a UEFA Euro 2024 qualifying Group E match against Moldova. In an eventful 3–0 victory Chorý scored a goal, got an assist, and was fouled to earn a Moldovan player his second yellow card to reduce his side to 10 men.

On 31 May 2026, Chorý was selected in the 26-man squad for the 2026 FIFA World Cup.

== Career statistics ==
=== Club ===
As of match played 17 October 2026

Appearances and goals by club, season and competition
| Club | Season | League | | | National cup (Note: Includes Czech Cup, Belgian Cup) | | Europe | | Total | |
| Club | Season | Division | Apps | Goals | Apps | Goals | Apps | Goals | Apps | Goals |
|---|---|---|---|---|---|---|---|---|---|---|
| Sigma Olomouc | 2013–14 | Czech First League | 7 | 1 | — | | — | | 7 | 1 |
| Sigma Olomouc | 2014–15 | Czech National Football League | 13 | 3 | 0 | 0 | — | | 13 | 3 |
| Sigma Olomouc | 2015–16 | Czech First League | 18 | 2 | 3 | 1 | — | | 21 | 3 |
| Sigma Olomouc | 2016–17 | Czech National Football League | 28 | 16 | 3 | 2 | — | | 31 | 18 |
| Sigma Olomouc | 2017–18 | Czech First League | 12 | 2 | 2 | 1 | — | | 21 | 3 |
| Sigma Olomouc | Total | | 80 | 24 | 8 | 4 | — | | 86 | 28 |
| Viktoria Plzeň | 2017–18 | Czech First League | 13 | 1 | 0 | 0 | 3 (Note: Appearances in UEFA Europa League) | 0 | 16 | 1 |
| Viktoria Plzeň | 2018–19 | Czech First League | 26 | 6 | 2 | 5 | 5 (Note: Three appearances and one goal in UEFA Champions League, two appearances in UEFA Europa League) | 1 | 33 | 12 |
| Viktoria Plzeň | 2019–20 | Czech First League | 32 | 6 | 4 | 1 | 4 (Note: Two appearances in UEFA Champions League, two appearances in UEFA Europa League) | 0 | 40 | 7 |
| Viktoria Plzeň | 2020–21 | Czech First League | 2 | 0 | 0 | 0 | 0 | 0 | 2 | 0 |
| Viktoria Plzeň | 2021–22 | Czech First League | 33 | 6 | 2 | 0 | 6 (Note: Appearances in UEFA Europa Conference League) | 1 | 41 | 7 |
| Viktoria Plzeň | 2022–23 | Czech First League | 34 | 13 | 1 | 0 | 12 (Note: Appearances in UEFA Champions League) | 4 | 47 | 17 |
| Viktoria Plzeň | 2023–24 | Czech First League | 30 | 12 | 4 | 3 | 13 | 4 | 47 | 19 |
| Viktoria Plzeň | Total | | 170 | 44 | 13 | 9 | 43 | 10 | 226 | 63 |
| Zulte Waregem (loan) | 2020–21 | Belgian First Division A | 16 | 4 | 2 | 0 | — | | 16 | 4 |
| Slavia Prague | 2024–25 | Czech First League | 32 | 14 | 2 | 0 | 11 (Note: Four appearances and two goals in UEFA Champions League, seven appearances and four goals in UEFA Europa League) | 6 | 45 | 20 |
| Slavia Prague | 2025–26 | Czech First League | 24 | 17 | 2 | 0 | 7 | 0 | 33 | 17 |
| Slavia Prague | 2026–27 | Czech First League | 8 | 4 | 0 | 0 | 2 | 0 | 10 | 4 |
| Slavia Prague | Total | | 64 | 35 | 4 | 0 | 20 | 6 | 88 | 41 |
| Career total | | | 328 | 107 | 25 | 13 | 63 | 16 | 416 | 136 |

=== International ===
As of match played 24 June 2026

Appearances and goals by national team and year
| National team | Year | Apps | Goals |
|---|---|---|---|
| Czech Republic | 2023 | 1 | 1 |
| Czech Republic | 2024 | 10 | 3 |
| Czech Republic | 2025 | 8 | 2 |
| Czech Republic | 2026 | 5 | 1 |
| Total | | 24 | 7 |

Scores and results list Czech Republic's goal tally first, score column indicates score after each Chorý goal.

List of international goals scored by Tomáš Chorý
| No. | Date | Venue | Opponent | Score | Result | Competition |
|---|---|---|---|---|---|---|
| 1 | 20 November 2023 | Andrův stadion, Olomouc, Czech Republic | Moldova | 2–0 | 3–0 | UEFA Euro 2024 qualifying |
| 2 | 26 March 2024 | Stadion Letná, Prague, Czech Republic | Armenia | 2–1 | 2–1 | Friendly |
| 3 | 11 October 2024 | Stadion Letná, Prague, Czech Republic | Albania | 1–0 | 2–0 | 2024–25 UEFA Nations League B |
| 4 | 11 October 2024 | Stadion Letná, Prague, Czech Republic | Albania | 2–0 | 2–0 | 2024–25 UEFA Nations League B |
| 5 | 8 September 2025 | Malšovická aréna, Hradec Králové, Czech Republic | Saudi Arabia | 1–0 | 1–1 | Friendly |
| 6 | 17 November 2025 | Andrův stadion, Olomouc, Czech Republic | Gibraltar | 2–0 | 6–0 | 2026 FIFA World Cup qualification |
| 7 | 4 June 2026 | Sports Illustrated Stadium, Harrison, United States | Guatemala | 2–1 | 3–1 | Friendly |

== Honours ==
Viktoria Plzeň

- Czech First League: 2017–18, 2021–22

Slavia Prague

- Czech First League: 2024–25, 2025–26
