= Lukáš Kalvach =

Czech footballer (born 1995)

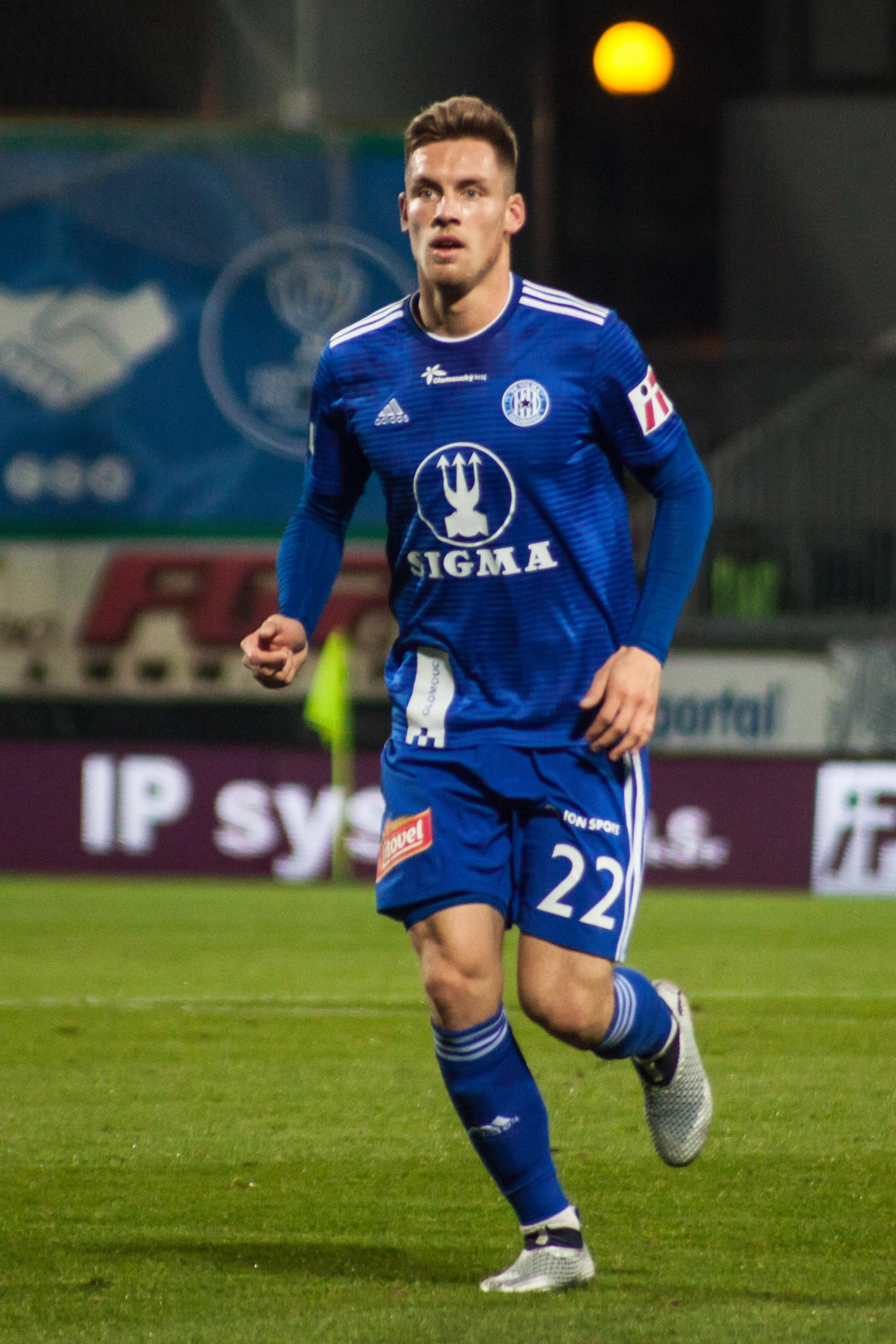
- Kalvach with Sigma Olomouc in 2018

Personal information
- Full name: Lukáš Kalvach
- Date of birth: 19 July 1995 (age 31)
- Place of birth: Olomouc, Czech Republic
- Height: 1.81 m (5 ft 11 in)
- Position: Defensive midfielder

Team information
- Current team: Qatar SC
- Number: 8

Youth career
- –2015: Sigma Olomouc

Senior career*
Years	Team	Apps	(Gls)
2015–2017	Sigma Olomouc B	26	(2)
2016–2017	→ Táborsko (loan)	23	(0)
2017–2019	Sigma Olomouc	59	(2)
2019–2025	Viktoria Plzeň	190	(16)
2025–	Qatar SC	0	(0)

International career^{‡}
2013–2014	Czech Republic U19	10	(0)
2014	Czech Republic U20	1	(0)
2019–	Czech Republic	5	(1)
- * Club domestic league appearances and goals as of 17 June 2025 ‡ National team caps and goals as of 7 September 2024

Lukáš Kalvach (born 19 July 1995) is a Czech professional footballer who plays as a defensive midfielder for Qatar Stars League club Qatar SC and the Czech Republic national team.

== Club career ==
Kalvach began his career playing at youth level for hometown club Sigma Olomouc. He was assigned to the reserve squad in 2015, making 26 appearances and scoring twice during the 2015–16 Czech National Football League season. He spent the following season on loan at Táborsko, for whom he appeared 25 times. At the beginning of the 2017–18 season, he joined Sigma Olomouc's senior squad and broke into the first team, making a total of 30 appearances in that season and 37 in the next, including in cup and Europa League matches. He scored his first senior goal on 20 September 2017, in an 8–0 cup win against Sokol Živanice. On 2 March 2019, he scored a brace in a 4–0 league win against Dukla Prague.

On 16 May 2019, Kalvach joined Viktoria Plzeň on a three-year deal.

On 18 June 2025, Kalvach signed a contract with Qatar SC as a free agent.

== International career ==
Having represented various Czech youth teams, Kalvach received his first call-up to the senior team on 2 September 2019. On 14 October 2019, he debuted as a starter in a friendly match against Northern Ireland which ended in a 2–3 loss for the Czechs.

== Career statistics ==
=== Club ===
As of 3 March 2024

Club	Season	League			Cup		Continental		Other		Total	
Club	Season	Division	Apps	Goals	Apps	Goals	Apps	Goals	Apps	Goals	Apps	Goals
Táborsko (loan)	2016–17	Czech National Football League	23	0	4	0	—		—		27	0
Sigma Olomouc	2017–18	Czech First League	29	0	1	1	—		—		30	1
Sigma Olomouc	2018–19	Czech First League	30	2	3	0	4	0	—		37	2
Sigma Olomouc	Total		59	2	4	1	4	0	—		67	3
Viktoria Plzeň	2019–20	Czech First League	33	5	3	0	4	0	—		40	5
Viktoria Plzeň	2020–21	Czech First League	33	2	5	1	3	0	—		41	3
Viktoria Plzeň	2021–22	Czech First League	27	0	1	0	—		—		28	0
Viktoria Plzeň	2022–23	Czech First League	28	2	1	0	12	0	—		41	2
Viktoria Plzeň	2023–24	Czech First League	22	2	1	0	12	2	—		35	4
Viktoria Plzeň	Total		143	11	11	1	31	2	0	0	185	14
Career total			225	13	19	2	35	2	0	0	279	17

== International goals ==
No.	Date	Venue	Opponent	Score	Result	Competition
1.	7 September 2024	Mikheil Meskhi Stadium, Tbilisi, Georgia	Georgia	1–4	1–4	2024–25 UEFA Nations League
