= Jindřich Staněk =

Czech footballer (born 1996)

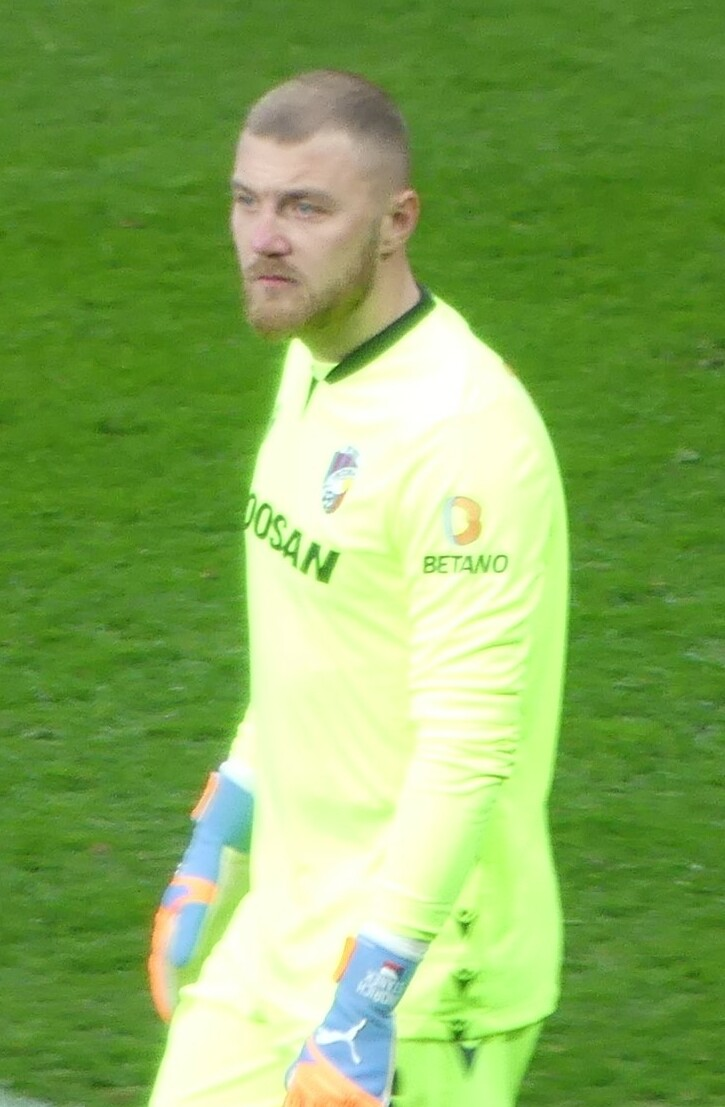
- Staněk in 2023

Personal information
- Date of birth: 27 April 1996 (age 30)
- Place of birth: Strakonice, Czech Republic
- Height: 1.91 m (6 ft 3 in)
- Position: Goalkeeper

Team information
- Current team: Al-Hazem (on loan from Slavia Prague)
- Number: 36

Youth career
- –2013: Sparta Prague

Senior career*
Years	Team	Apps	(Gls)
2013–2014	Sparta Prague	0	(0)
2014–2016	Everton	0	(0)
2015	→ Hyde United (loan)	5	(0)
2016–2020	České Budějovice	46	(0)
2017	→ Třebíč (loan)	3	(0)
2020	→ Viktoria Plzeň (loan)	2	(0)
2021–2024	Viktoria Plzeň	95	(0)
2024–	Slavia Prague	44	(0)
2026–	→ Al-Hazem (loan)	2	(0)

International career^{‡}
2011–2012	Czech Republic U16	7	(0)
2012–2013	Czech Republic U17	10	(0)
2013	Czech Republic U18	2	(0)
2013–2015	Czech Republic U19	18	(0)
2016	Czech Republic U20	1	(0)
2015–2018	Czech Republic U21	10	(0)
2021–	Czech Republic	14	(0)
- * Club domestic league appearances and goals as of 16 October 2026 ‡ National team caps and goals as of 22:21, 5 September 2025 (UTC)

Jindřich Staněk (born 27 April 1996) is a Czech professional footballer who plays as a goalkeeper for Saudi Pro League club Al-Hazem on loan from Slavia Prague and the Czech Republic national team.

== Club career ==
=== Early career and time in England ===
Staněk started his career with Sparta Prague, appearing on the bench for the first team on three occasions in 2013. On 31 January 2014, he joined Premier League club Everton on a 2 1/2-year deal for an undisclosed fee. On 29 September 2015, Staněk joined Hyde United on a one-month loan deal, going on to make five appearances for the club. In June 2016, having made just two appearances on the bench for Everton, he was released by the club.

=== Return to the Czech Republic ===
In September 2016, Staněk returned to the Czech Republic and signed for Dynamo České Budějovice, later being sent on loan with Třebíč in 2017. He made his Czech National Football League debut for České Budějovice on 24 September 2017 against FK Baník Sokolov.

Staněk joined Viktoria Plzeň on loan in January 2020, making his league debut in a goalless draw against Baník Ostrava on 5 July. He signed for the club permanently on 3 January 2021, playing the entire 2020–21 Czech Cup final against Slavia Prague on 20 May, which Plzeň lost 1–0. At the end of the season, Staněk was shortlisted for the Best Player Award together with Adam Hložek and Tomáš Holeš, which Holeš went on to win. In July 2022, Staněk extended his contract with Viktoria Plzeň until 2025.

On 5 January 2024, Staněk signed a contract with Slavia Prague until 2027 as part of a swap transfer with midfielders Lukáš Červ and Matěj Valenta. He made his league debut for the club in a goalless draw against Sparta Prague on 3 March 2024.

On 7 September 2026, Staněk joined Saudi Pro League club Al-Hazem on a one-year loan deal.

== International career ==
Staněk represented Czech Republic at every youth international level from under-16 to under-21.

Staněk debuted for the Czech senior squad on 5 September 2021 in a 2022 World Cup qualification against Belgium, ending in a 3–0 away loss. He entered the game in the 12th minute for the injured Tomáš Vaclík, with the Czech Republic already down 1–0. Staněk made his first start in the 1–1 draw against Ukraine three days later.

On 29 May 2024, Staněk was included in the final Czech squad for the UEFA Euro 2024.

On 31 May 2026, Staněk was selected in the 26-man squad for the 2026 FIFA World Cup.

== Personal life ==
Outside football, Staněk also creates rap songs under the stage name Ejaytime. In January 2025, he and his wife welcomed twin daughters.

== Career statistics ==
=== Club ===
As of match played 8 March 2026

Appearances and goals by club, season and competition
Club	Season	League			National cup (Note: Includes Czech Cup)		League cup		Europe		Other		Total	
Club	Season	Division	Apps	Goals	Apps	Goals	Apps	Goals	Apps	Goals	Apps	Goals	Apps	Goals
Sparta Prague	2013–14	Czech First League	0	0	0	0	—		—		—		0	0
Everton	2013–14	Premier League	0	0	0	0	0	0	—		—		0	0
Everton	2014–15	Premier League	0	0	0	0	0	0	—		—		0	0
Everton	2015–16	Premier League	0	0	0	0	0	0	—		—		0	0
Everton	Total		0	0	0	0	0	0	—		—		0	0
Třebíč (loan)	2016–17	MSFL	14	0	—		—		—		—		14	0
České Budějovice	2017–18	Czech National Football League	17	0	1	0	—		—		—		18	0
České Budějovice	2018–19	Czech National Football League	18	0	3	0	—		—		—		21	0
České Budějovice	2019–20	Czech First League	11	0	1	0	—		—		—		12	0
České Budějovice	Total		46	0	5	0	—		—		—		51	0
Viktoria Plzeň (loan)	2019–20	Czech First League	2	0	0	0	—		—		—		2	0
Viktoria Plzeň	2020–21	Czech First League	19	0	2	0	—		0	0	—		21	0
Viktoria Plzeň	2021–22	Czech First League	28	0	1	0	—		0	0	—		29	0
Viktoria Plzeň	2022–23	Czech First League	33	0	0	0	—		11 (Note: Appearances in UEFA Champions League)	0	—		44	0
Viktoria Plzeň	2023–24	Czech First League	16	0	0	0	—		8 (Note: Appearances in UEFA Europa Conference League)	0	—		24	0
Viktoria Plzeň	Total		96	0	3	0	—		19	0	—		118	0
Slavia Prague	2023–24	Czech First League	12	0	0	0	—		2 (Note: Appearances in UEFA Europa League)	0	—		14	0
Slavia Prague	2024–25	Czech First League	13	0	0	0	—		—		—		13	0
Slavia Prague	2025–26	Czech First League	19	0	0	0	—		6	0	—		25	0
Slavia Prague	Total		44	0	0	0	—		8	0	—		52	0
Career total			202	0	8	0	0	0	27	0	0	0	237	0

=== International ===
As of match played 5 September 2025

Appearances and goals by national team and year
National team	Year	Apps	Goals
Czech Republic	2021	2	0
Czech Republic	2022	3	0
Czech Republic	2023	3	0
Czech Republic	2024	5	0
Czech Republic	2025	1	0
Total		14	0

== Honours ==
Sparta Prague

- Czech First League: 2013–14
- Czech Cup: 2013–14

Dynamo Ceske Budejovice

- Czech National Football League: 2018–19

Viktoria Plzen

- Czech First League: 2021–22

Slavia Prague

- Czech First League: 2024–25, 2025–26

Individual

- Czech First League Goalkeeper of the Year: 2021–22
