= Mohamed Tijani =

Beninese professional footballer

Personal information
- Date of birth: 10 July 1997 (age 29)
- Place of birth: Ouragahio, Ivory Coast
- Height: 1.89 m (6 ft 2 1/2 in)
- Position: Centre back

Youth career
- Africa Sports
- Rayo Vallecano

Senior career*
Years	Team	Apps	(Gls)
2016–2018	Rayo Vallecano B	12	(2)
2018–2019	Vyškov	29	(2)
2019–2020	Vysočina Jihlava	27	(1)
2020	→ Slavia Prague (loan)	2	(0)
2020–2022	Slavia Prague	0	(0)
2020–2021	→ Slovan Liberec (loan)	8	(0)
2022	→ Teplice (loan)	16	(1)
2022–2024	Viktoria Plzeň	4	(0)
2023	→ Zbrojovka Brno (loan)	13	(0)
2023–2024	→ Yverdon-Sport (loan)	27	(1)
2024–2026	Yverdon-Sport	47	(0)

International career^{‡}
2022–	Benin	14	(1)
- * Club domestic league appearances and goals as of 6 September 2026 ‡ National team caps and goals as of 14 November 2024

Mohamed Tijani (born 10 July 1997) is a professional footballer who plays as a defender. Born in Ivory Coast, he plays for the Benin national team.

== Club career ==
On 10 February 2020, Tijani joined Slavia Prague on loan from Vysočina Jihlava for the remainder of the season, with an option to make the move permanent.

On 5 August 2020, Slavia announced the permanent signing of Tijani, and the plan to immediately loan him out to Slovan Liberec.

On 17 July 2023, Tijani joined Yverdon-Sport on loan from Viktoria Plzeň for the next season, with an option to make the move permanent. His Yverdon contract was mutually terminated on 10 September 2026.

== International career ==
Tijani was born in the Ivory Coast to a Beninese father and Ivorian mother. He was called up to the Benin national team for a set of friendlies in March 2022.

== Career statistics ==
=== Club ===
As of match played 25 June 2023

Appearances and goals by club, season and competition
Club	Season	League			National Cup		Continental		Other		Total	
Club	Season	Division	Apps	Goals	Apps	Goals	Apps	Goals	Apps	Goals	Apps	Goals
Vysočina Jihlava	2018–19	Czech National Football League	15	0	0	0	—		—		15	0
Vysočina Jihlava	2019–20	Czech National Football League	14	1	3	0	—		—		17	1
Vysočina Jihlava	Career total		27	1	3	0	—		—		32	1
Slavia Prague (loan)	2019–20	Czech First League	2	0	0	0	—		—		2	0
Slovan Liberec (loan)	2020–21	Czech First League	8	0	0	0	5	0	—		13	0
Teplice (loan)	2021–22	Czech First League	16	1	0	0	—		—		16	1
Viktoria Plzeň	2022–23	Czech First League	4	0	1	1	3	0	—		8	1
Zbrojovka Brno (loan)	2022–23	Czech First League	13	0	0	0	—		—		13	0
Career total			70	2	4	1	8	0	0	0	84	3
