= Modou N'Diaye =

Senegalese association footballer

Personal information
- Full name: Modou Birame N'Diaye
- Date of birth: 29 October 1996 (age 30)
- Place of birth: Kaolack, Senegal
- Height: 1.84 m (6 ft 0 in)
- Position: Midfielder

Team information
- Current team: Viktoria Plzeň
- Number: 99

Senior career*
Years	Team	Apps	(Gls)
2014–2018	Douanes		
2018–2020	Evian Thonon	15	(1)
2020–2021	Silon Táborsko	13	(1)
2021–2023	Viktoria Plzeň	14	(1)
2021–2022	→ Karviná (loan)	11	(1)
- * Club domestic league appearances and goals as of 25 May 2023

Modou Birame N'Diaye (born 29 October 1996) is a Senegalese professional footballer who last played as a midfielder for Czech club Viktoria Plzeň.

== Club career ==
N'Diaye began his career in his native Senegal with the club Douanes in 2014. In the summer of 2018, he moved to France with Evian Thonon in the French 6th division, and helped score the goal that earned them promotion to the Championnat National 3 on 2 June 2019. He transferred to the Czech National Football League club Silon Táborsko on 9 November 2020. In 2021, he transferred to the Czech First League side Viktoria Plzeň, and joined Karviná for the remainder of the 2021-22 season. He returned to Viktoria Plzeň in the summer of 2022, and participated in the UEFA Champions League that campaign.
