= Joel Ngandu Kayamba =

Congolese footballer

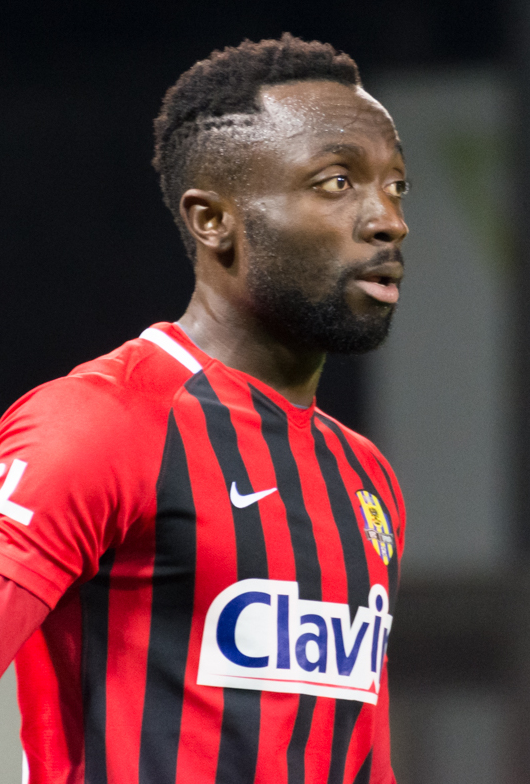

Personal information
- Date of birth: 17 April 1992 (age 34)
- Place of birth: Kinshasa, Zaire
- Height: 1.77 m (5 ft 9 1/2 in)
- Position: Midfielder

Team information
- Current team: Atyrau
- Number: 11

Youth career
- Sharks XI
- 2013: Hlinsko
- 2013–2014: → Příbram (loan)
- 2015: → Hradec Králové (loan)

Senior career*
Years	Team	Apps	(Gls)
2013–2015	Hlinsko		
2015–2017	Pardubice	33	(1)
2017–2018	Opava	32	(11)
2018–2022	Viktoria Plzeň	75	(4)
2018	→ Opava (loan)	10	(2)
2022	→ Samsunspor (loan)	11	(0)
2022–2024	Boluspor	41	(4)
2024–2025	Atyrau	21	(0)
2025	Abu Salim	1	(0)
2025–	Atyrau	3	(0)

International career^{‡}
2020–	DR Congo	2	(0)
- * Club domestic league appearances and goals as of 2 November 2025 ‡ National team caps and goals as of 27 March 2021

Joel Ngandu Kayamba (born 17 April 1992) is a Congolese professional footballer who plays as a midfielder for Kazakh club Atyrau.

== Club career ==
=== Early Czech Republic career ===
He made his debut in a professional league in Pardubice's Czech National Football League 1–1 draw at České Budějovice on 6 November 2015. He signed for Opava in 2017. In his first season with Opava, he achieved promotion to the top tier of Czech football, Czech First League. He also won a National Football League Player of the Month award in that season. He scored the winning goal in Opava's first Czech First League victory - a 2–0 home win against Jablonec on 1 September 2018.

=== Viktoria Plzeň ===
In September 2018, Kayamba signed a contract with FC Viktoria Plzeň for a speculated transfer fee of €800,000. Opava chairman Marek Hájek revealed that this move constituted a record transfer revenue for the club, breaking the previous record that was the sale of Libor Kozák. Kayamba would also stay at Opava on loan until the end of 2018.

== International career ==
He made his debut for DR Congo national football team on 17 November 2020 in a Cup of Nations qualifier game against Angola. He substituted Jordan Botaka in the 80th minute.

== Personal life ==
He moved to the Czech Republic from France in 2013, married a Czech wife and has two children. He speaks four languages fluently: French, English, Czech and Lingala.
