= Šimon Falta =

Czech footballer

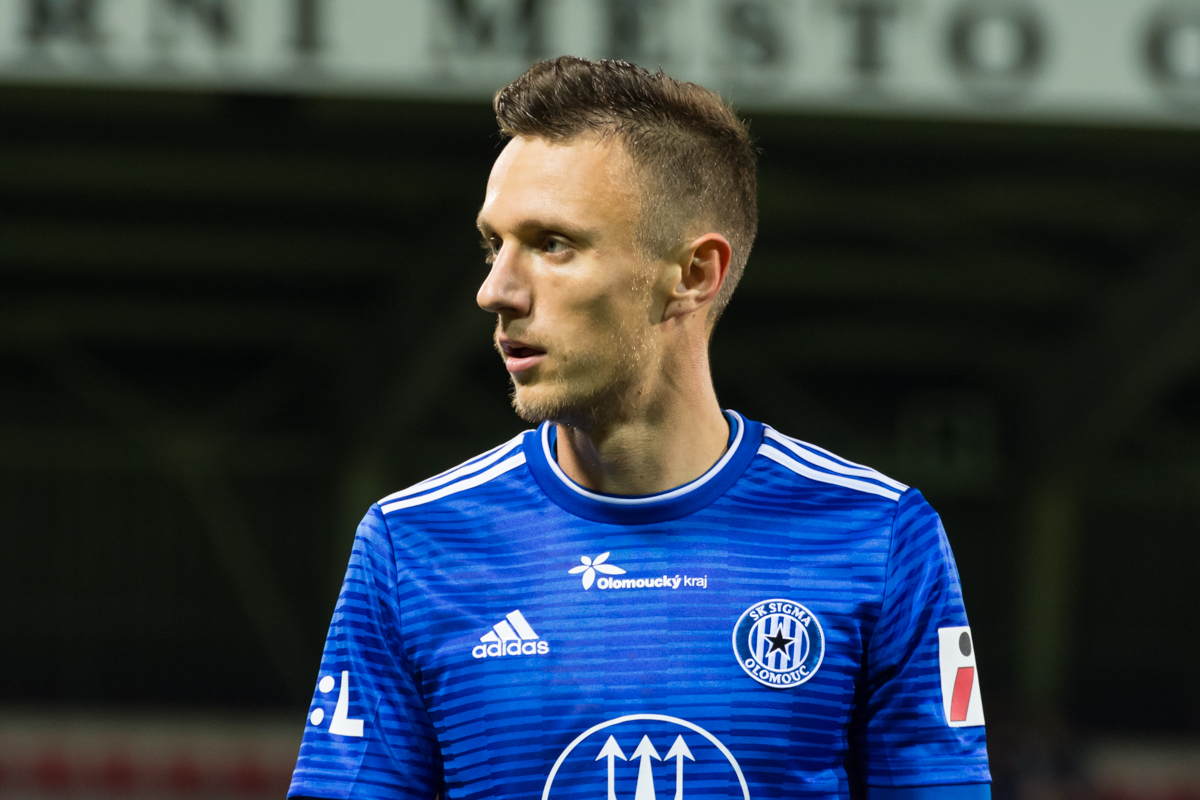

Personal information
- Date of birth: 23 April 1993 (age 33)
- Place of birth: Ústí nad Orlicí, Czech Republic
- Height: 1.82 m (6 ft 0 in)
- Position: Midfielder

Team information
- Current team: Viktoria Plzeň

Senior career*
Years	Team	Apps	(Gls)
2013–2021	Sigma Olomouc	175	(17)
2021–	Viktoria Plzeň	26	(1)
2022	→ Baník Ostrava (loan)	13	(0)
2022–2023	→ Zbrojovka Brno (loan)	26	(0)

International career^{‡}
2010–2011	Czech Republic U18	6	(1)
2011–2012	Czech Republic U19	9	(0)
2013	Czech Republic U20	2	(0)
2013	Czech Republic U21	2	(0)
2017–	Czech Republic	2	(0)
- * Club domestic league appearances and goals as of 25 May 2023 ‡ National team caps and goals as of 08:34, 4 May 2020 (UTC)

Šimon Falta (born 23 April 1993) is a Czech professional footballer who plays for Viktoria Plzeň.
