= Václav Míka =

Czech footballer (born 2000)

Personal information
- Date of birth: 1 June 2000 (age 26)
- Place of birth: Plzeň, Czech Republic
- Height: 1.89 m (6 ft 2 in)
- Position: Defender

Team information
- Current team: Tatran Prešov (on loan from Viktoria Plzeň)
- Number: 6

Youth career
- Viktoria Plzeň

Senior career*
| Years | Team | Apps | (Gls) |
| 2019– | Viktoria Plzeň | 2 | (0) |
| 2019– | →→ Viktoria Plzeň B | 10 | (0) |
| 2022 | → MFK Chrudim (loan) | 14 | (0) |
| 2022 | → Pardubice (loan) | 0 | (0) |
| 2022–2024 | → MFK Chrudim (loan) | 46 | (6) |
| 2024–2025 | → České Budějovice (loan) | 20 | (2) |
| 2025– | → Tatran Prešov (loan) | 6 | (0) |

International career^{‡}
| 2016–2017 | Czech Republic U17 | 12 | (0) |
| 2017–2018 | Czech Republic U18 | 9 | (1) |
| 2019 | Czech Republic U19 | 5 | (0) |
- * Club domestic league appearances and goals as of 17 January 2026 ‡ National team caps and goals as of 21 July 2019

Václav Míka (born 1 June 2000) is a Czech professional footballer who plays for Tatran Prešov on loan from Viktoria Plzeň.

== Club career ==
He made his Czech First League debut for Viktoria Plzeň on 6 February 2021 in a game against Slovan Liberec.
