= Lukáš Matějka =

Czech footballer

Personal information
- Date of birth: 20 December 1997 (age 28)
- Place of birth: Czech Republic
- Height: 1.81 m (5 ft 11 1/2 in)
- Position: Forward

Team information
- Current team: Silon Táborsko
- Number: 29

Senior career*
Years	Team	Apps	(Gls)
2017–2024	Viktoria Plzeň	8	(1)
2017	→ České Budějovice (loan)	11	(1)
2017–2018	→ FK Ústí nad Labem (loan)	15	(1)
2018	→ TJ Jiskra Domažlice (loan)	15	(14)
2018–2020	→ FK Ústí nad Labem (loan)	55	(22)
2020	→ České Budějovice (loan)	7	(1)
2021–2022	→ Pardubice (loan)	20	(2)
2022–2024	→ Dukla Prague (loan)	55	(24)
2024–2025	Dukla Prague	15	(0)
2025	→ Skalica (loan)	13	(1)
2025–	Silon Táborsko	30	(15)

International career^{‡}
2016	Czech Republic U19	3	(0)
- * Club domestic league appearances and goals as of 24 May 2026 ‡ National team caps and goals as of 2 July 2024

Lukáš Matějka (born 20 December 1997) is a Czech football player who plays as a forward for Silon Táborsko.

== Club career ==
=== Viktoria Plzeň ===
In 2017 Matějka became a part of FC Viktoria Plzeň squad. He played his first match for this team on 17 January 2021 against 1. FK Příbram.

=== Loans at České Budějovice, Ústí, and Domažlice ===
On 4 January 2017 Matějka was loaned to SK Dynamo České Budějovice in the Czech National Football League. In six months long loan he played in 11 league matches and scored 1 goal. On 1 July 2017 he joined FK Ústí nad Labem of the same league. In his six-month loan he played in 15 league matches, 2 matches in Czech Cup and scored 2 goals. On 25 January 2018 he was loaned to TJ Jiskra Domažlice in Bohemian Football League. In six months long loan he played in 15 league matches and scored 14 goals.

=== Second loans at Ústí and České Budějovice ===
On 1 July 2018 he was loaned to Ústí nad Labem for the second time, on a two-year loan. He played a total of 55 league matches, 4 matches in Czech Cup and scored 26 goals. On 17 August 2020 Matějka joined České Budějovice on loan for the second time, this time in the Czech First League. He scored his first Czech First League goal on 28 August in a 2–2 away draw with Baník Ostrava, and finished his six-month loan with one goal from seven league matches.

=== Loans at Pardubice and Dukla ===
Matějka joined FK Pardubice on a season-long loan in August 2021, playing 20 matches and scoring two goals in the Czech First League. He then joined Dukla Prague in July 2022 on a year's loan deal.

=== Dukla Prague ===
On 10 July 2024, Matějka signed a contract with Dukla Prague until 2026.

=== Loan at Skalica ===
On 14 January 2025, Matějka signed a half-year loan deal with Skalica without option to buy.

== International career ==
Matějka played international football at under-19 level for Czech Republic U19. He played in 3 matches without scoring a goal.
