= Matěj Hybš =

Czech footballer (born 1993)

Personal information
- Date of birth: 3 January 1993 (age 33)
- Place of birth: Prague, Czech Republic
- Height: 1.80 m (5 ft 11 in)
- Positions: Left-back; centre-back

Team information
- Current team: Mladá Boleslav
- Number: 11

Youth career
- Sparta Prague

Senior career*
Years	Team	Apps	(Gls)
2012–2017	Sparta Prague	32	(0)
2014–2015	→ Vysočina Jihlava (loan)	23	(1)
2016	→ Jablonec (loan)	23	(0)
2017–2020	Slovan Liberec	57	(5)
2020–2023	Viktoria Plzeň	14	(0)
2022	→ Bruk-Bet Termalica (loan)	13	(0)
2022–2023	→ Teplice (loan)	29	(4)
2023–2025	Bohemians 1905	50	(0)
2026–	Mladá Boleslav	15	(0)

International career
2009	Czech Republic U16	6	(1)
2009–2010	Czech Republic U17	14	(2)
2010–2011	Czech Republic U18	9	(0)
2011–2012	Czech Republic U19	12	(0)
2012–2015	Czech Republic U21	13	(0)
- * Club domestic league appearances and goals as of 27 May 2026

Matěj Hybš (born 3 January 1993) is a Czech professional footballer who plays as a left-back or centre-back for Czech First League side Mladá Boleslav.

== Club career ==
He made his league debut on 12 August 2012 in Czech First League match against 1. FC Slovácko. In August 2014 he was loaned for one year to Czech first league club FC Vysočina Jihlava.

On 12 June 2023, Hybš joined Bohemians 1905.

On 19 December 2025, Hybš signed a contract with Mladá Boleslav until 30 June 2027 with option.

== International career ==
He represented the Czech Republic at every youth level except Under-20.

== Honours ==
Sparta Prague

- Czech First League: 2013–14
- Czech Cup: 2013–14

Viktoria Plzeň

- Czech First League: 2021–22
