= Luděk Pernica =

Czech footballer

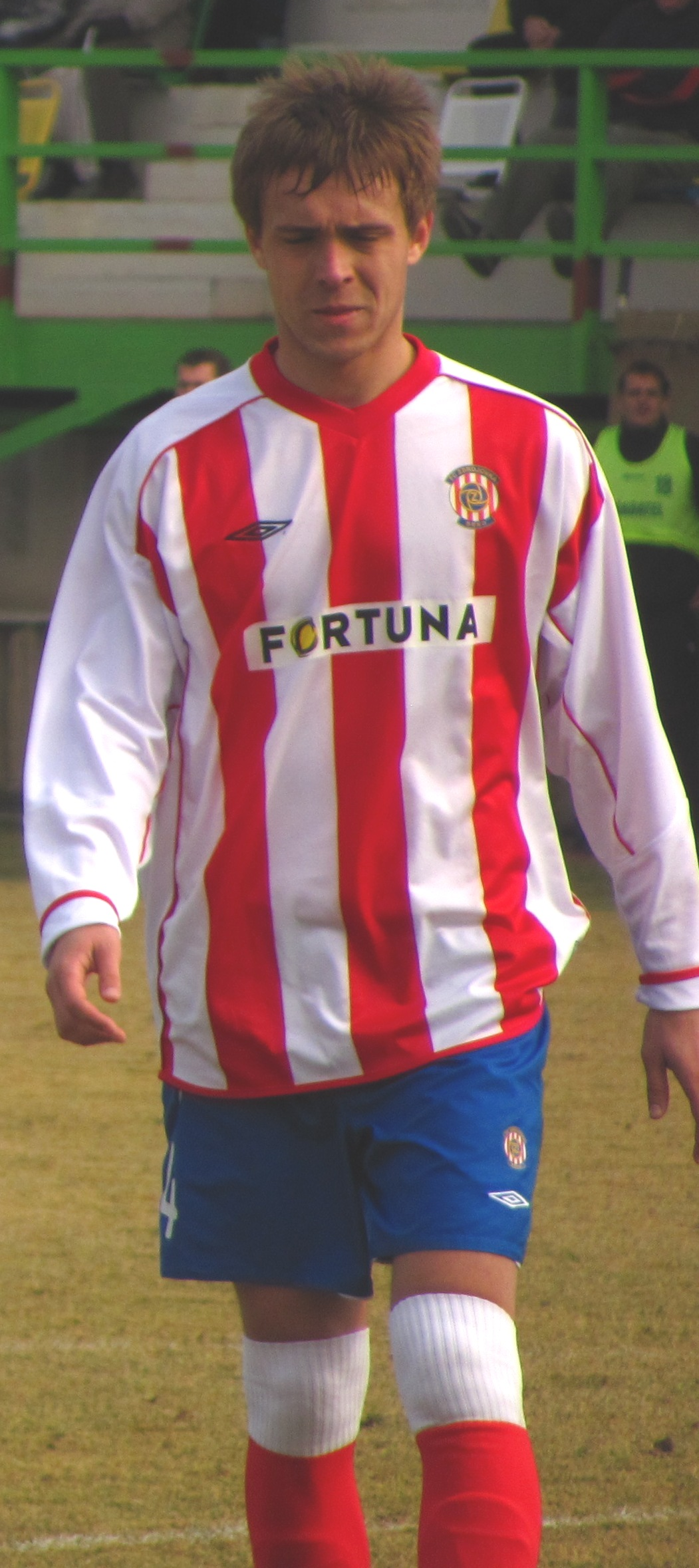

Personal information
- Date of birth: 16 June 1990 (age 36)
- Place of birth: Boskovice, Czechoslovakia
- Height: 1.87 m (6 ft 2 in)
- Position: Centre back

Team information
- Current team: Artis Brno B

Youth career
- 1995–2000: ASK Blansko
- 2000–2009: Zbrojovka Brno

Senior career*
Years	Team	Apps	(Gls)
2009–2011	Zbrojovka Brno B	35	(2)
2010–2014	Zbrojovka Brno	89	(6)
2014–2018	Jablonec	93	(5)
2018–2023	Viktoria Plzeň	91	(5)
2018	→ Jablonec (loan)	14	(0)
2021–2022	→ Zbrojovka Brno (loan)	19	(4)
2023–2025	Zbrojovka Brno	14	(0)
2025–	Artis Brno	0	(0)
2025–	→→ Artis Brno B	0	(0)

International career^{‡}
2011	Czech Republic U20	1	(0)
- * Club domestic league appearances and goals as of 20 June 2024 ‡ National team caps and goals as of 6 September 2013

Luděk Pernica (born 16 June 1990) is a Czech football player who currently plays for Artis Brno B in the Czech Fourth Division.

He scored for FK Jablonec against Slavia Prague in the 2017–18 Czech Cup final but Prague won 3–1 on 9 May 2018.
