= Lukáš Hejda =

Czech footballer (born 1990)

Personal information
- Full name: Lukáš Hejda
- Date of birth: 9 March 1990 (age 36)
- Place of birth: Bílovec, Czechoslovakia
- Height: 1.89 m (6 ft 2 in)
- Position: Centre back

Youth career
- Baník Ostrava
- 2007–2009: Sparta Prague

Senior career*
Years	Team	Apps	(Gls)
2009–2012	Sparta Prague	12	(0)
2011	→ FK Jablonec (loan)	6	(0)
2011–2012	→ 1. FK Příbram (loan)	19	(2)
2012–2026	Viktoria Plzeň	266	(28)

International career^{‡}
2005–2006	Czech Republic U16	13	(2)
2006–2007	Czech Republic U17	8	(1)
2007–2008	Czech Republic U18	4	(0)
2008–2009	Czech Republic U19	6	(0)
2010–2012	Czech Republic U21	6	(0)
2014	Czech Republic	1	(0)
- * Club domestic league appearances and goals as of 17 June 2025 ‡ National team caps and goals as of 15 March 2022

Lukáš Hejda (born 9 March 1990) is a Czech former professional footballer who last played as a defender for FC Viktoria Plzeň. Hejda was called up to the Czech Republic national team for the first time in 2014 ahead of a friendly match against Austria. He made his debut in that match, coming on as a substitute for Josef Hušbauer towards the end of the 2–1 loss.

== Career statistics ==
As of 1 June 2015

Season	Club	League		Cup		Continental		Total	
Season	Club	Apps	Goals	Apps	Goals	Apps	Goals	Apps	Goals
2009–10 Czech First League	Sparta Prague	4	0	0	0	0	0	4	0
2010–11 Czech First League	Sparta Prague	8	0	0	0	0	0	8	0
2010–11 Czech First League	FK Jablonec	6	0	0	0	0	0	6	0
2011–12 Czech First League	1. FK Příbram	19	2	0	0	0	0	19	2
2012–13 Czech First League	Viktoria Plzeň	15	1	0	0	6	0	21	1
2013–14 Czech First League	Viktoria Plzeň	15	1	0	0	5	0	20	1
2014–15 Czech First League	Viktoria Plzeň	13	2	0	0	0	0	13	2
Career Total		80	6	0	0	11	0	91	6
