= Aleš Čermák =

Czech footballer

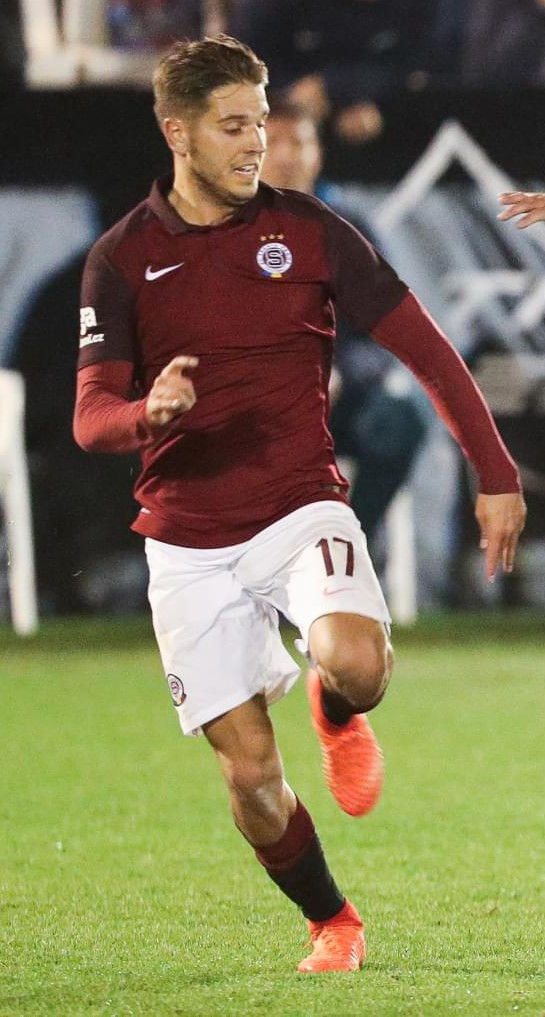

Personal information
- Date of birth: 1 October 1994 (age 32)
- Place of birth: Prague, Czech Republic
- Height: 1.80 m (5 ft 11 in)
- Position: Midfielder

Team information
- Current team: Bohemians 1905
- Number: 47

Youth career
- 2001–2013: Sparta Prague

Senior career*
Years	Team	Apps	(Gls)
2013–2017	Sparta Prague	21	(1)
2014	→ Loko Vltavín (loan)	14	(1)
2014–2015	→ Hradec Králové (loan)	22	(4)
2015–2016	→ Mladá Boleslav (loan)	26	(6)
2017–2023	Viktoria Plzeň	75	(19)
2023	→ Bohemians 1905 (loan)	5	(2)
2023–2024	DAC Dunajská Streda	12	(2)
2024–	Bohemians 1905	53	(4)

International career^{‡}
2009–2010	Czech Republic U16	13	(0)
2010–2011	Czech Republic U17	15	(2)
2011–2012	Czech Republic U18	11	(2)
2012–2013	Czech Republic U19	12	(1)
2013	Czech Republic U20	3	(0)
2014–2017	Czech Republic U21	13	(7)
- * Club domestic league appearances and goals as of 27 May 2026 ‡ National team caps and goals as of 27 March 2017

Aleš Čermák (born 1 October 1994) is a Czech football player who currently plays for Bohemians 1905. Previously, he played for Viktoria Plzeň in the Czech First League and DAC Dunajská Streda in the Slovak First Football League.
