= 2012–13 FC Viktoria Plzeň season =

Viktoria Plzeň
2012–13 season
- Chairman: Adolf Šádek
- Manager: Pavel Vrba
- Stadium: Doosan Arena
- Czech First League: 1st
- Czech Cup: Quarter-finals
- UEFA Europa League: Round of 16
- Top goalscorer: League: Marek Bakoš (10)
- Average home league attendance: 10,047
- Biggest win: 5–0 v Ruch Chorzów (H) (9 August 2012, UEFA Europa League)
- Biggest defeat: 2–3 v Zbrojovka Brno (H) (12 August 2012, Czech First League); 0–1 v Příbram (A) (7 October 2012, Czech First League); 0–1 v Sparta Prague (A) (30 March 2013, Czech First League); 0–1 v Slavia Prague (H) (11 May 2013, Czech First League); 1–2 v Slovan Liberec (H) (26 May 2013, Czech First League); 1–2 v Hradec Králové (A) (29 November 2012, Czech Cup); 1–2 v Jablonec (A) (3 April 2013, Czech Cup); 3–4 v Jablonec (H) (10 April 2013, Czech Cup); 1–2 v Lokeren (A) (23 August 2012, UEFA Europa League); 0–1 v Atlético Madrid (A) (4 October 2012, UEFA Europa League); 0–1 v Fenerbahçe (H) (7 March 2013, UEFA Europa League)

The 2012–13 season was Football Club Viktoria Plzeň's 8th consecutive season in the Czech First League. In addition to the domestic league, Viktoria Plzeň participated in that season's editions of the Czech Cup and the UEFA Europa League.

== Squad ==
Squad at end of season

Note: Flags indicate national team as defined under FIFA eligibility rules; some limited exceptions apply. Players may hold more than one non-FIFA nationality.

No.	Pos.	Nation	Player
1	GK	SVK	Matúš Kozáčik
2	DF	CZE	Lukáš Hejda
3	DF	CZE	Ondřej Chocholoušek
5	MF	CZE	Marek Hanousek
6	DF	CZE	Matěj Končal
7	MF	CZE	Martin Zeman
8	DF	CZE	David Limberský
9	FW	CZE	Stanislav Tecl
10	MF	CZE	Pavel Horváth
11	FW	CZE	Martin Fillo
12	FW	SVK	Michal Ďuriš
13	GK	CZE	Petr Bolek
14	DF	CZE	Radim Řezník

No.	Pos.	Nation	Player
16	MF	CZE	Vladimír Darida
19	MF	CZE	Jan Kovařík
20	FW	RUS	Roman Adamov
21	DF	CZE	Václav Procházka
23	FW	SVK	Marek Bakoš
24	GK	CZE	Aleš Mandous
26	MF	CZE	Daniel Kolář
27	DF	CZE	František Rajtoral
28	DF	SVK	Marián Čišovský
29	MF	CZE	David Štípek
30	GK	CZE	Martin Ticháček
31	MF	CZE	Matěj Kyndl
33	GK	CZE	Roman Pavlík

== Competitions ==
=== Overview ===
Competition	First match	Last match	Starting round	Final position	Record							
Competition	First match	Last match	Starting round	Final position	Pld	W	D	L	GF	GA	GD	Win %
Czech First League	29 July 2012	1 June 2013	Matchday 1	Winners	30	20	5	5	54	21	+33	66.67
Czech Cup	26 September 2012	10 April 2013	Third round	Quarter-finals	5	2	0	3	9	10	−1	40.00
UEFA Europa League	19 July 2012	14 March 2013	Second qualifying round	Round of 16	16	11	2	3	31	9	+22	68.75
Total					51	33	7	11	94	40	+54	64.71

Source: Competitions

=== Czech First League ===
==== League table ====
Pos	Team	Pld	W	D	L	GF	GA	GD	Pts	Qualification or relegation
1	Viktoria Plzeň (C)	30	20	5	5	54	21	+33	65	Qualification for Champions League second qualifying round
2	Sparta Prague	30	19	6	5	55	23	+32	63	Qualification for Europa League second qualifying round
3	Slovan Liberec	30	16	6	8	46	34	+12	54	Qualification for Europa League second qualifying round
4	Jablonec	30	13	10	7	49	41	+8	49	Qualification for Europa League third qualifying round (Note: Jablonec won the 2012–13 Czech Cup and qualified for the third qualifying round of the UEFA Europa League.)
5	Sigma Olomouc	30	13	8	9	38	29	+9	47	

Source: Fortuna liga
Rules for classification: 1) points; 2) head-to-head points; 3) head-to-head goal difference; 4) head-to-head goals scored; 5) goal difference; 6) number of goals scored.
(C) Champions

==== Results summary ====
Overall								Home						Away					
Pld	W	D	L	GF	GA	GD	Pts	W	D	L	GF	GA	GD	W	D	L	GF	GA	GD
30	20	5	5	54	21	+33	65	9	3	3	27	12	+15	11	2	2	27	9	+18

Source: Competitions

==== Results by round ====
Round	1	2	3	4	5	6	7	8	9	10	11	12	13	14	15	16	17	18	19	20	21	22	23	24	25	26	27	28	29	30
Ground	H	A	H	A	H	A	H	A	H	A	H	A	A	H	A	H	A	H	A	H	A	H	A	H	A	H	H	A	H	A
Result	W	D	L	W	W	W	W	D	D	L	D	W	W	W	W	W	W	D	W	W	L	W	W	W	W	W	L	W	L	W
Position	2	2	6	3	2	2	1	2	2	4	4	4	3	1	1	1	1	1	1	1	1	1	1	1	1	1	1	1	1	1
Points	3	4	4	7	10	13	16	17	18	18	19	22	25	28	31	34	37	38	41	44	44	47	50	53	56	59	59	62	62	65

Source: Matches
A = Away; H = Home; W = Win; D = Draw; L = Loss

==== Matches ====
29 July 2012 1	Viktoria Plzeň	3–0	Hradec Králové	Plzeň
17:00 CEST (UTC+2)	Horváth (yellow card) 16'; Kolář 35'; Bakoš 68'; Poděbradský 78' (o.g.)	Report	Strnad (yellow card) 15'; Fukal (yellow card) 68'	Stadium: Doosan Arena; Attendance: 10,310; Referee: Pavel Franěk; Assistant referees: Patrik Filípek, Kryštof Mencl

5 August 2012 2	Vysočina Jihlava	1–1	Viktoria Plzeň	Jihlava
19:15 CEST (UTC+2)	Karlík 15'; Jungr (yellow card) 22'; Tecl (yellow card) 38'; Josl (yellow card) 85'; Koloušek (yellow card) 90'; Sedláček (yellow card) 90'	Report	Kolář 31'; Horváth (yellow card) 36'; Ďuriš (yellow card) 47'; Rajtoral (yellow card) 54'	Stadium: Stadion v Jiráskově ulici Attendance: 4,150; Referee: Jaroslav Bílek; Assistant referees: Josef Košec, Roman Tacina

12 August 2012 3	Viktoria Plzeň	2–3	Zbrojovka Brno	Plzeň
17:00 CEST (UTC+2)	Procházka 9'; Rajtoral 51'	Report	Pernica 19'; Zavadil (yellow card) 39'; Mezlík 73'; Halaška 75'	Stadium: Doosan Arena; Attendance: 10,513; Referee: Jan Jílek; Assistant referees: Dušan Pospíšil, Václav Štěrba

19 August 2012 4	Baník Ostrava	1–3	Viktoria Plzeň	Ostrava
17:30 CEST (UTC+2)	Kaprálik (yellow card) 24'; Greguš (yellow card) 40' (red card) 56'; Vomáčka (yellow card) 45'; Milosavljev (yellow card) 68'; Onuchukwu 73'	Report	Ševínský 8'; Horváth 29'; Hanousek 50', (yellow card) 86'; Ďuriš (yellow card) 76'	Stadium: Bazaly; Attendance: 9,872; Referee: Tomáš Kocourek; Assistant referees: Ivo Nádvorník, Jiří Jiřík

26 August 2012 5	Viktoria Plzeň	2–0	Mladá Boleslav	Plzeň
17:00 CEST (UTC+2)	Hora (yellow card) 39'; Limberský (yellow card) 41'; Hanousek 63'; Procházka 90'	Report	Kysela (yellow card) 14'; Ondřejka (yellow card) 70'	Stadium: Doosan Arena; Attendance: 9,685; Referee: Pavel Královec; Assistant referees: Martin Wilczek, Antonín Kordula

2 September 2012 6	Dukla Prague	1–4	Viktoria Plzeň	Prague
19:30 CEST (UTC+2)	Malý (yellow card) 31'; Fillo 86' (o.g.)	Report	Bakoš 31', 66'; Limberský (yellow card) 36'; Hanousek (yellow card) 57', (goal) 77'; Darida 58'	Stadium: Stadion Juliska; Attendance: 3,258; Referee: Tomáš Adámek; Assistant referees: Ladislav Gallo, Zdeněk Dobrovolný

15 September 2012 7	Viktoria Plzeň	1–0	Sparta Prague	Plzeň
15:00 CEST (UTC+2)	Řezník (yellow card) 31'; Horváth 40' (pen.); Fillo (yellow card) 77'	Report	Pamić (yellow card) 17'; Kadlec (yellow card) 22'; Pavelka (yellow card) 37'; Hušbauer (yellow card) 39'; Kweuke (yellow card) 55'	Stadium: Doosan Arena; Attendance: 11,722; Referee: Radek Matějek; Assistant referees: Jan Paták, Josef Košec

23 September 2012 8	Teplice	1–1	Viktoria Plzeň	Teplice
17:00 CEST (UTC+2)	Mahmutović 10', (yellow card) 79'; Vachoušek (yellow card) 20'; Ljevaković (yellow card) 90'	Report	Čišovský (red card) 13'; Ďuriš 16'	Stadium: Na Stínadlech; Attendance: 5,480; Referee: Jiří Jech; Assistant referees: Patrik Filípek, Dušan Pospíšil

30 September 2012 9	Viktoria Plzeň	1–1	Slovácko	Plzeň
17:00 CEST (UTC+2)	Rajtoral 59'	Report	Daníček (yellow card) 30'; Došek 54'	Stadium: Doosan Arena; Attendance: 10,187; Referee: Jan Jílek; Assistant referees: Jiří Jiřík, Petr Blažej

7 October 2012 10	Příbram	1–0	Viktoria Plzeň	Příbram
17:35 CEST (UTC+2)	Mareš 18'; Divíšek (yellow card) 25'; Dejmek (yellow card) 28'; Šlapák (yellow card) 73'	Report	Procházka (yellow card) 41'; Limberský (yellow card) 87'	Stadium: Na Litavce; Attendance: 2,967; Referee: Radek Příhoda; Assistant referees: Jan Paták, Robert Hájek

20 October 2012 11	Viktoria Plzeň	1–1	Jablonec	Plzeň
18:20 CEST (UTC+2)	Čišovský 58'; Darida (yellow card) 86'	Report	Piták (yellow card) 40'; Beneš 85'	Stadium: Doosan Arena; Attendance: 10,280; Referee: Miroslav Zelinka; Assistant referees: Kryštof Mencl, Emanuel Marek

29 October 2012 12	Dynamo České Budějovice	0–1	Viktoria Plzeň	České Budějovice
17:20 CET (UTC+1)		Report	Darida (yellow card) 7'; Čišovský 17', (yellow card) 67'; Ďuriš (yellow card) 70'; Kozáčik (yellow card) 89'	Stadium: Stadion Střelecký ostrov Attendance: 1,987; Referee: Karel Hrubeš; Assistant referees: Patrik Filípek, Emil Ubias

4 November 2012 13	Slavia Prague	0–1	Viktoria Plzeň	Prague
18:05 CET (UTC+1)	Mičola (yellow card) 30'; Nitrianský (yellow card) 33'; Škoda (yellow card) 43'; Hubáček (yellow card) 57'; Petrák (yellow card) 68'; Latka (yellow card) 73'; Tusjak (yellow card) 87'	Report	Hubáček 30' (o.g.); Kolář (yellow card) 40'; Horváth (yellow card) 65'; Kozáčik (yellow card) 83'	Stadium: Eden Arena; Attendance: 8,931; Referee: Jaroslav Bílek; Assistant referees: Josef Košec, Michal Urban

11 November 2012 14	Viktoria Plzeň	3–0	Sigma Olomouc	Plzeň
20:00 CET (UTC+1)	Kolář 11'; Darida 37'; Hora 71'; Zeman (yellow card) 78'	Report		Stadium: Doosan Arena; Attendance: 10,238; Referee: Jiří Jech; Assistant referees: Ondřej Pelikán, Robert Hájek

17 November 2012 15	Slovan Liberec	1–2	Viktoria Plzeň	Liberec
18:20 CET (UTC+1)	Vácha (yellow card) 1'; Bosančić 19', (yellow card) 90'; Šural (yellow card) 38'; Blažek (yellow card) 45'; Kušnír (yellow card) 70'	Report	Limberský (yellow card) 10'; Darida (yellow card) 27', (goal) 78'; Procházka (red card) 43'; Bakoš (yellow card) 45'; Štípek 62'	Stadium: Stadion u Nisy; Attendance: 4,180; Referee: Tomáš Kocourek; Assistant referees: Kryštof Mencl, Ivo Nádvorník

26 November 2012 16	Viktoria Plzeň	1–0	Vysočina Jihlava	Plzeň
18:00 CET (UTC+1)	Bakoš 23', (yellow card) 49'; Čišovský (yellow card) 52'; Ďuriš (yellow card) 77'	Report	Josl (yellow card) 30'; Vaculík (yellow card) 74'	Stadium: Doosan Arena; Attendance: 9,862; Referee: Libor Kovařík; Assistant referees: Tomáš Kovařík, Jiří Kříž

25 February 2013 17	Zbrojovka Brno	1–3	Viktoria Plzeň	Brno
18:00 CET (UTC+1)	Glaser 7', (yellow card) 67'; Šoljić (yellow card) 38'; Kunc (yellow card) 85'	Report	Rajtoral 30'; Bakoš 75', 90'	Stadium: Městský fotbalový stadion Srbská; Attendance: 6,225; Referee: Pavel Franěk; Assistant referees: Jan Paták, Petr Blažej; Fourth official: Jan Kalenda

3 March 2013 18	Viktoria Plzeň	1–1	Baník Ostrava	Plzeň
20:00 CET (UTC+1)	Procházka 66'	Report	Milosavljev (yellow card) 42', (goal) 51'; Baroš (yellow card) 76'; Bárta (yellow card) 76'; Kaprálik (yellow card) 81'	Stadium: Doosan Arena; Attendance: 9,135; Referee: Karel Hrubeš; Assistant referees: Martin Wilczek, Jiří Kříž; Fourth official: Zbyněk Proske

10 March 2013 19	Mladá Boleslav	0–2	Viktoria Plzeň	Mladá Boleslav
15:25 CET (UTC+1)	Jarolím (yellow card) 13'; Štohanzl (yellow card) 22'; Dosoudil (yellow card) 32'; Šćuk (yellow card) 35'; Magera (yellow card) 38' (red card) 76'	Report	Fillo (yellow card) 42' (red card) 66'; Kolář 45'; Limberský (yellow card) 54'; Procházka (yellow card) 62'; Horváth 83' (pen.)	Stadium: Městský stadion Attendance: 4,786; Referee: Jaroslav Bílek; Assistant referees: Ondřej Pelikán, Jiří Jiřík; Fourth official: Radek Příhoda

17 March 2013 20	Viktoria Plzeň	4–0	Dukla Prague	Plzeň
18:05 CET (UTC+1)	Procházka (yellow card) 6'; Bakoš 15', (yellow card) 59'; Čišovský 62'; Kovařík 86'; Adamov 88'; Rajtoral (yellow card) 90'	Report	Vorel (red card) 1'	Stadium: Doosan Arena; Attendance: 8,754; Referee: Drahoslav Drábek; Assistant referees: Josef Košec, Tomáš Kovařík; Fourth official: Michal Paták

30 March 2013 21	Sparta Prague	1–0	Viktoria Plzeň	Prague
20:15 CET (UTC+1)	Lafata 68'	Report	Řezník (yellow card) 41'; Darida (yellow card) 77'	Stadium: Generali Arena; Attendance: 19,128; Referee: Wolfgang Stark (Germany); Assistant referees: Jan-Hendrik Salver (Germany), Mike Pickel (Germany); Fourth official: Libor Kovařík (Czech Republic)

7 April 2013 22	Viktoria Plzeň	2–1	Teplice	Plzeň
16:00 CEST (UTC+2)	Bakoš 41', 46'	Report	Mahmutović (yellow card) 27'; Rosa (yellow card) 65'; Litsingi 90'	Stadium: Doosan Arena; Attendance: 8,562; Referee: Tomáš Kocourek; Assistant referees: Robert Hájek, Radek Kotík; Fourth official: Ondřej Lerch

14 April 2013 23	Slovácko	0–2	Viktoria Plzeň	Uherské Hradiště
16:00 CEST (UTC+2)	Valenta (yellow card) 39'; Kubáň (yellow card) 78'; Trousil (yellow card) 82'; Heča (red card) 90'	Report	Čišovský (yellow card) 47'; Kolář 67'; Darida (yellow card) 74'; Horváth 90' (pen.)	Stadium: Městský fotbalový stadion Miroslava Valenty; Attendance: 6,015; Referee: Pavel Franěk; Assistant referees: Jiří Jiřík, Pavel Peřina; Fourth official: Jaroslav Bílek

19 April 2013 24	Viktoria Plzeň	2–0	Příbram	Plzeň
20:45 CEST (UTC+2)	Hejda 41'; Střihavka 77' (o.g.)	Report	Dejmek (yellow card) 27'; Valenta (yellow card) 60'; Tarczal (yellow card) 68'	Stadium: Doosan Arena; Attendance: 8,812; Referee: Jan Jílek; Assistant referees: Kryštof Mencl, Petr Blažej; Fourth official: Jiří Adam

27 April 2013 25	Jablonec	1–3	Viktoria Plzeň	Jablonec nad Nisou
16:50 CEST (UTC+2)	Čížek 28', (yellow card) 30'; Piták (yellow card) 36'; Loučka (yellow card) 51'	Report	Kolář 35'; Procházka 50'; Bakoš 80'	Stadium: Stadion Střelnice; Attendance: 4,025; Referee: Jiří Jech; Assistant referees: Patrik Filípek, Václav Štěrba; Fourth official: Pavel Orel

3 May 2013 26	Viktoria Plzeň	3–2	Dynamo České Budějovice	Plzeň
20:15 CEST (UTC+2)	Darida 10', 23'; Řezník 85'	Report	Linhart 51', (yellow card) 84'; Táborský 60'; Hanzlík (yellow card) 90'	Stadium: Doosan Arena; Attendance: 9,622; Referee: Karel Hrubeš; Assistant referees: Ivo Nádvorník, Petr Vysloužil; Fourth official: Martin Nenadál

11 May 2013 27	Viktoria Plzeň	0–1	Slavia Prague	Plzeň
18:00 CEST (UTC+2)	Procházka (yellow card) 77'	Report	Škoda 15'; Juhar (red card) 19'; Kisel (yellow card) 19'; Nitrianský (yellow card) 46'; Čontofalský (yellow card) 90'	Stadium: Doosan Arena; Attendance: 11,705; Referee: Tomáš Kocourek; Assistant referees: Martin Wilczek, Roman Tacina; Fourth official: Jaroslav Bílek

22 May 2013 28	Sigma Olomouc	0–1	Viktoria Plzeň	Olomouc
19:30 CEST (UTC+2)	Navrátil (yellow card) 55'; Škerle (yellow card) 58'	Report	Kovařík (yellow card) 34'; Rajtoral (yellow card) 43'; Kolář 77'	Stadium: Andrův stadion Attendance: 6,884; Referee: Pavel Franěk; Assistant referees: Jiří Jiřík, Dušan Pospíšil; Fourth official: Radek Matějek

26 May 2013 29	Viktoria Plzeň	1–2	Slovan Liberec	Plzeň
18:00 CEST (UTC+2)	Štípek 82', (yellow card) 85'; Darida (yellow card) 90'	Report	Rabušic 17'; Rybalka (yellow card) 25'; Šural (yellow card) 65'; Delarge (yellow card) 67'; Hušek 90'	Stadium: Doosan Arena; Attendance: 11,315; Referee: Jiří Jech; Assistant referees: Tomáš Kovařík, Petr Blažej; Fourth official: Miroslav Zelinka

1 June 2013 30	Hradec Králové	0–3	Viktoria Plzeň	Hradec Králové
17:00 CEST (UTC+2)	Plašil (yellow card) 52'; Štěpán (yellow card) 52'	Report	Darida 1'; Procházka 10'; Čišovský 49'; Rajtoral (yellow card) 85'	Stadium: Všesportovní stadion Attendance: 5,250; Referee: Jaroslav Bílek; Assistant referees: Roman Tacina, Robert Hájek; Fourth official: Pavel Ochotnický

=== Czech Cup ===
26 September 2012 Third round	Chomutov	2–3	Viktoria Plzeň	Chomutov
18:00 CEST (UTC+2)	Svec 7', (yellow card) 22'; Nadenicek (yellow card) 33'; Smola 54'; Pavlicek (yellow card) 60'	Report	Malakyan (yellow card) 34', (goal) 58'; Procházka 73'; Hora 84'	Stadium: Letní stadion

==== Fourth round ====
29 November 2012 First leg	Hradec Králové	2–1	Viktoria Plzeň	Hradec Králové
17:30 CET (UTC+1)	Jánošík (yellow card) 58'; Halilović 77'; Šisler (yellow card) 90+1'; Harba 90+3'	Report	Hora 20'; Štípek (yellow card) 37'	Stadium: Všesportovní stadion

23 March 2013 Second leg	Viktoria Plzeň	1–0 ((a) 2–2 agg.)	Hradec Králové	Plzeň
17:00 CET (UTC+1)	Adamov 35'	Report	Plašil (yellow card) 67'; Poděbradský (yellow card) 82'; Hadaščok (yellow card) 87'	Stadium: Doosan Arena
Note: 2–2 on aggregate. Viktoria Plzeň won on away goals.

==== Quarter-finals ====
3 April 2013 First leg	Jablonec	2–1	Viktoria Plzeň	Jablonec nad Nisou
16:30 CEST (UTC+2)	Piták 62', 76' (pen.); Třešňák (yellow card) 79'	Report	Čišovský 5', (yellow card) 11'; Limberský (yellow card) 75'	Stadium: Stadion Střelnice

10 April 2013 Second leg	Viktoria Plzeň	3–4 (4–6 agg.)	Jablonec	Plzeň
18:00 CEST (UTC+2)	Rossi 72' (o.g.); Darida 73'; Zeman (yellow card) 75', (goal) 87'; Řezník (yellow card) 89'	Report	Novák 4'; Vaněk 6', 53', 70'	Stadium: Doosan Arena
Note: Jablonec won 6–4 on aggregate.

=== UEFA Europa League ===
==== Qualifying rounds ====
===== Second qualifying round =====
19 July 2012 First leg	Metalurgi Rustavi (Georgia (country))	1–3	(Czech Republic) Viktoria Plzeň	Tbilisi, Georgia (Note: The match was played at the Mikheil Meskhi Stadium, Tbilisi instead of Metalurgi Rustavi regular stadium, Poladi Stadium, Rustavi.)
20:00 GET (UTC+4)	Sukhiashvili (yellow card) 22'; Tatanashvili 29'; Razmadze (yellow card) 90+2'	Report	Horváth 14', 59'; Kolář 32'; Fillo (yellow card) 52'; Darida (yellow card) 62'	Stadium: Mikheil Meskhi Stadium; Attendance: 2,995; Referee: Emir Alecković (Bosnia and Herzegovina); Assistant referees: Senad Ibrišimbegović (Bosnia and Herzegovina), Goran Dujak (Bosnia and Herzegovina); Fourth official: Elmir Pilav (Bosnia and Herzegovina)

26 July 2012 Second leg	Viktoria Plzeň (Czech Republic)	2–0 (5–1 agg.)	(Georgia (country)) Metalurgi Rustavi	Plzeň, Czech Republic
20:00 CEST (UTC+2)	Ďuriš 7'; Darida 10'	Report		Stadium: Doosan Arena; Attendance: 11,446; Referee: Espen Berntsen (Norway); Assistant referees: Dag-Roger Nebben (Norway), Leif Erik Opland (Norway); Fourth official: Dag Vidar Hafsås (Norway)
Note: Viktoria Plzeň won 5–1 on aggregate.

===== Third qualifying round =====
2 August 2012 First leg	Ruch Chorzów (Poland)	0–2	(Czech Republic) Viktoria Plzeň	Chorzów, Poland (Note: Stadion Ruchu capacity was limited to 4,000 due to renovation works.)
19:00 CEST (UTC+2)	Straka (yellow card) 8'; Piech (yellow card) 71'	Report	Limberský (yellow card) 40'; Ševínský (yellow card) 56'; Štípek 79'; Ďuriš 85'	Stadium: Stadion Ruchu; Attendance: 3,824; Referee: Antonio Damato (Italy); Assistant referees: Nicola Nicoletti (Italy), Francesco De Luca (Italy); Fourth official: Domenico Celi (Italy)

9 August 2012 Second leg	Viktoria Plzeň (Czech Republic)	5–0 (7–0 agg.)	(Poland) Ruch Chorzów	Plzeň, Czech Republic
20:00 CEST (UTC+2)	Ďuriš 2', 12', 28'; Bakoš 54'; Hanousek 87'; Štípek (yellow card) 90+2'	Report	Lisowski (yellow card) 49'; Đokić (yellow card) 88'	Stadium: Doosan Arena; Attendance: 11,651; Referee: Matej Jug (Slovenia); Assistant referees: Milan Kogej (Slovenia), Gregor Rojko (Slovenia); Fourth official: Darko Čeferin (Slovenia)
Note: Viktoria Plzeň won 7–0 on aggregate.

==== Play-off round ====
23 August 2012 First leg	Lokeren (Belgium)	2–1	(Czech Republic) Viktoria Plzeň	Brussels, Belgium (Note: The match was played at the King Baudouin Stadium, Brussels instead of Lokeren regular stadium, Daknamstadion, Lokeren.)
20:30 CEST (UTC+2)	Harbaoui 10'; Persoons (yellow card) 28'; Marić 90+4' (pen.)	Report	Bakoš 29'; Ševínský (yellow card) 63' (yellow-red card) 90+3'	Stadium: King Baudouin Stadium; Attendance: 4,254; Referee: Antonio Mateu Lahoz (Spain); Assistant referees: Pau Cebrián Devís (Spain), Jon Núñez (Spain); Fourth official: Alfonso Alvarez Izquierdo (Spain)

30 August 2012 Second leg	Viktoria Plzeň (Czech Republic)	1–0 ((a) 2–2 agg.)	(Belgium) Lokeren	Plzeň, Czech Republic
20:15 CEST (UTC+2)	Bakoš 37', (yellow card) 66'; Darida (yellow card) 90'	Report	Taravel (yellow card) 24'	Stadium: Doosan Arena; Attendance: 11,711; Referee: Jonas Eriksson (Sweden); Assistant referees: Magnus Sjöblom (Sweden), Joakim Flink (Sweden); Fourth official: Michael Lerjéus (Sweden)
Note: 2–2 on aggregate. Viktoria Plzeň won on away goals.

==== Group stage ====
Pos	Team	Pld	W	D	L	GF	GA	GD	Pts	Qualification	PLZ	ATL	ACA	HTA
1	(Czech Republic) Viktoria Plzeň	6	4	1	1	11	4	+7	13	Advance to knockout phase	—	1–0	3–1	4–0
2	(Spain) Atlético Madrid	6	4	0	2	7	4	+3	12	Advance to knockout phase	1–0	—	2–1	1–0
3	(Portugal) Académica	6	1	2	3	6	9	−3	5		1–1	2–0	—	1–1
4	(Israel) Hapoel Tel Aviv	6	1	1	4	4	11	−7	4		1–2	0–3	2–0	—

Source: Soccerway

20 September 2012 1	Viktoria Plzeň (Czech Republic)	3–1	(Portugal) Académica	Plzeň, Czech Republic
19:00 CEST (UTC+2)	Horváth 46', (yellow card) 49'; Ďuriš 58'; Rajtoral 80'; Kozáčik (yellow card) 88'	Report	Eduardo 19'; Halliche (yellow card) 21'; S. Cissé (yellow card) 50'; Edinho (yellow card) 78'; Ogu (yellow card) 82'	Stadium: Doosan Arena; Attendance: 10,845; Referee: Hannes Kaasik (Estonia); Assistant referees: Jaanus Mutli (Estonia), Dmitri Vinogradov (Estonia); Fourth official: Silver Koiv (Estonia); Goal-line assistants: Kristo Tohver (Estonia), Eiko Saar (Estonia)

4 October 2012 2	Atlético Madrid (Spain)	1–0	(Czech Republic) Viktoria Plzeň	Madrid, Spain
21:05 CEST (UTC+2)	Gabi (yellow card) 11'; Belözoğlu (yellow card) 20'; Rodríguez 90+3'	Report	Procházka (yellow card) 31'	Stadium: Vicente Calderón Stadium; Attendance: 19,772; Referee: Antony Gautier (France); Assistant referees: Michael Annonier (France), Philippe Jeanne (France); Fourth official: Laurent Stien (France); Goal-line assistants: Laurent Duhamel (France), Ruddy Buquet (France)

25 October 2012 3	Hapoel Tel Aviv (Israel)	1–2	(Czech Republic) Viktoria Plzeň	Tel Aviv, Israel
22:05 IDT (UTC+3)	Maman 19'; Djemba-Djemba (yellow card) 32'; Hutba (yellow card) 54' (yellow-red card) 64'; Paintsil (yellow card) 85'	Report	Čišovský (yellow card) 33'; Horváth 45+1'; Rajtoral 55'; Kolář (yellow card) 75'; Řezník (yellow card) 90+4'	Stadium: Bloomfield Stadium; Attendance: 12,248; Referee: Felix Zwayer (Germany); Assistant referees: Markus Häcker (Germany), Mark Borsch (Germany); Fourth official: Christoph Bornhorst (Germany); Goal-line assistants: Christian Dingert (Germany), Tobias Welz (Germany)

8 November 2012 4	Viktoria Plzeň (Czech Republic)	4–0	(Israel) Hapoel Tel Aviv	Plzeň, Czech Republic
19:00 CET (UTC+1)	Kolář 23', 76'; Štípek (yellow card) 32', (goal) 39'; Limberský (yellow card) 45'; Bakoš 84'	Report	Djemba-Djemba (red card) 41'; A. Cohen (yellow card) 45'; Badir (yellow card) 67'	Stadium: Doosan Arena; Attendance: 11,389; Referee: Stanislav Todorov (Bulgaria); Assistant referees: Ventsislav Gavrilov (Bulgaria), Nikolay Angelov (Bulgaria); Fourth official: Veselin Dobriyanov (Bulgaria); Goal-line assistants: Nikolai Yordanov (Bulgaria), Georgi Yordanov (Bulgaria)

22 November 2012 5	Académica (Portugal)	1–1	(Czech Republic) Viktoria Plzeň	Coimbra, Portugal
20:05 WET (UTC)	Dias (yellow card) 57'; Ricardo (yellow card) 66'; Eduardo (yellow card) 77'; Marinho (yellow card) 79'; Edinho 88' (pen.); Ferreira (yellow card) 90'	Report	Štípek (yellow card) 48'; Darida (yellow card) 54'; Horváth 57' (pen.); Hora (yellow card) 63'	Stadium: Estádio Cidade de Coimbra; Attendance: 3,717; Referee: Marcin Borski (Poland); Assistant referees: Rafal Rostkowski (Poland), Maciej Wierzbowski (Poland); Fourth official: Tomasz Listkiewicz (Poland); Goal-line assistants: Dawid Piasecki (Poland), Daniel Stefański (Poland)

6 December 2012 6	Viktoria Plzeň (Czech Republic)	1–0	(Spain) Atlético Madrid	Plzeň, Czech Republic
19:00 CET (UTC+1)	Procházka 26'; Limberský (yellow card) 77'	Report	Manquillo (yellow card) 55'; Costa (red card) 90+1'	Stadium: Doosan Arena; Attendance: 11,067; Referee: Kristinn Jakobsson (Iceland); Assistant referees: Sigurdur Oli Thorleifsson (Iceland), Frosti Vidar Gunnarsson (Iceland); Fourth official: Gunnar Gunnarsson (Iceland); Goal-line assistants: Thorvaldur Árnason (Iceland), Gunnar Jarl Jónsson (Iceland)

==== Knockout phase ====
===== Round of 32 =====
14 February 2013 First leg	Napoli (Italy)	0–3	(Czech Republic) Viktoria Plzeň	Naples, Italy
19:00 CET (UTC+1)	Rolando (yellow card) 39'; Inler (yellow card) 80'	Report	Darida 28'; Rajtoral 79'; Tecl 90'; Hejda (yellow card) 90+4'	Stadium: Stadio San Paolo; Attendance: 13,606; Referee: Pol van Boekel (Netherlands); Assistant referees: Berry Simons (Netherlands), Patrick Langkamp (Netherlands); Fourth official: Davie Goossens (Netherlands); Goal-line assistants: Danny Makkelie (Netherlands), Peter Janssen (Netherlands)

21 February 2013 Second leg	Viktoria Plzeň (Czech Republic)	2–0 (5–0 agg.)	(Italy) Napoli	Plzeň, Czech Republic
21:05 CET (UTC+1)	Limberský (yellow card) 16'; Kovařík 51'; Bakoš (yellow card) 55'; Darida (yellow card) 70'; Tecl 74'	Report	Behrami (yellow card) 31'; Donadel (yellow card) 43'; Gamberini (yellow card) 55'; Cavani (yellow card) 70'; Maggio (yellow card) 76'	Stadium: Doosan Arena; Attendance: 11,607; Referee: Viktor Kassai (Hungary); Assistant referees: Gábor Erös (Hungary), György Ring (Hungary); Fourth official: Róbert Kispál (Hungary); Goal-line assistants: Tamás Bognár (Hungary), Mihály Fábián (Hungary)
Note: Viktoria Plzeň won 5–0 on aggregate.

===== Round of 16 =====
7 March 2013 First leg	Viktoria Plzeň (Czech Republic)	0–1	(Turkey) Fenerbahçe	Plzeň, Czech Republic
19:00 CET (UTC+1)		Report	Ziegler (yellow card) 51'; Webó 81'	Stadium: Doosan Arena; Attendance: 11,701; Referee: Gianluca Rocchi (Italy); Assistant referees: Elenito Di Liberatore (Italy), Gianluca Cariolato (Italy); Fourth official: Massimiliano Grilli (Italy); Goal-line assistants: Andrea De Marco (Italy), Mauro Bergonzi (Italy)

14 March 2013 Second leg	Fenerbahçe (Turkey)	1–1 (2–1 agg.)	(Czech Republic) Viktoria Plzeň	Istanbul, Turkey
22:05 EET (UTC+2)	Uçan 44'; Kuyt (yellow card) 64'	Report	Darida 61'; Bakoš (yellow card) 62'; Kolář (yellow card) 84'; Procházka (yellow card) 87'	Stadium: Şükrü Saracoğlu Stadium; Attendance: 320; Referee: Manuel Gräfe (Germany); Assistant referees: Markus Häcker (Germany), Holger Henschel (Germany); Fourth official: Mike Pickel (Germany); Goal-line assistants: Felix Zwayer (Germany), Tobias Welz (Germany)
Note: The match was played behind closed doors due to the punishment handed to Fenerbahçe by UEFA following incidents at their round of 32 match second leg against BATE Borisov on 21 February 2013. Fenerbahçe won 2–1 on aggregate.
