= 2013–14 FC Viktoria Plzeň season =

Viktoria Plzeň
2013–14 season
- Chairman: Adolf Šádek
- Manager: Pavel Vrba
- Stadium: Stadion města Plzně
- Gambrinus liga: 2nd
- Pohár České pošty: Runners-up
- Czech Supercup: Runners-up
- UEFA Champions League: Group stage (3rd)
- UEFA Europa League: Round of 16
Home colours	Away colours

The 2013–14 season was Viktoria Plzeň's ninth consecutive season in the Gambrinus liga. Having won the Gambrinus liga the previous season, they entered the competition as defending champions and finished second. As league champions they also took part in the UEFA Champions League, from which they qualified for the UEFA Europa League.

== Season overview ==
The club's budget for the 2013–14 season was 100 million crowns, the third-highest budget in the league. This was lower than Slavia Prague (110 million) and Sparta Prague (300 million).

=== Pre-season ===
Viktoria started pre-season training schedule on 17 June at home grounds in Plzeň and until end of June team played three matches with local teams from West Bohemia. From the beginning of July the team moved to Austrian Westendorf for a training preparation camp including three games with ex-Bundesliga side Fürth, Russian Premier League team Krasnodar and last year's Champions League participant CFR Cluj.

During the summer transfer window Viktoria introduced two new players – Tomáš Hořava from Olomouc and Milan Petržela, who returned to the club after an unsuccessful season in Augsburg.

== Players ==
=== Squad ===
Squad No.	Name	Nationality	Position(s)	Since	Date of birth (age)	Signed from	Games played	Goals scored
Goalkeepers
1	Matúš Kozáčik	(Slovakia)	GK	2012	27 December 1983 (age 42)	(Cyprus) Anorthosis	27	0
13	Petr Bolek	(Czech Republic)	GK	2012	30 June 1984 (age 42)	(Slovakia) Senica	3	0
33	Roman Pavlík	(Czech Republic)	GK	2010	17 January 1976 (age 50)	Kladno	35	0
Defenders
2	Lukáš Hejda	(Czech Republic)	CB	2012	9 March 1990 (age 36)	Sparta Prague	15	1
3	Ondřej Chocholoušek	(Czech Republic)	DF	2012	13 November 1994 (age 31)	Youth squad	0	0
6	Matěj Končal	(Czech Republic)	DF	2012	8 December 1993 (age 32)	Youth squad	2	0
8	David Limberský	(Czech Republic)	LWB	2008	6 October 1983 (age 42)	Sparta Prague	195	14
14	Radim Řezník	(Czech Republic)	RWB	2011	20 January 1989 (age 37)	Ostrava	37	1
21	Václav Procházka	(Czech Republic)	CB	2012	8 May 1984 (age 42)	Mladá Boleslav	116	8
27	František Rajtoral	(Czech Republic)	RWB / RM	2009	12 March 1986 (age 40)	Ostrava	112	11
28	Marián Čišovský	(Slovakia)	CB	2011	2 November 1979 (age 46)	(Romania) Timișoara	50	10
Midfielders
5	Marek Hanousek	(Czech Republic)	MF	2012	6 August 1991 (age 35)	Dukla	10	3
5	Tomáš Hořava	(Czech Republic)	CM	2013	29 May 1988 (age 38)	Olomouc	0	0
10	Pavel Horváth	(Czech Republic)	CM	2008	22 April 1975 (age 51)	Sparta Prague	138	30
11	Milan Petržela	(Czech Republic)	RM	2013	19 June 1983 (age 43)	(Germany) Augsburg	118	22
12	Michal Ďuriš	(Slovakia)	RM / LM	2010	1 June 1988 (age 38)	(Slovakia) Banská Bystrica	76	10
16	Vladimír Darida	(Czech Republic)	CM	2011	8 August 1990 (age 36)	Youth squad	55	9
19	Jan Kovařík	(Czech Republic)	LM	2013	19 June 1988 (age 38)	Jablonec	14	1
26	Daniel Kolář	(Czech Republic)	AM	2008	27 October 1985 (age 40)	Sparta Prague	127	36
17	Jakub Hora	(Czech Republic)	RM / LM	2011	23 February 1991 (age 35)	Most	23	1
Forwards
9	Stanislav Tecl	(Czech Republic)	FW	2013	1 September 1990 (age 35)	Jihlava	14	0
23	Marek Bakoš	(Slovakia)	FW	2009	15 April 1983 (age 43)	(Slovakia) Ružomberok	105	42
15	Tomáš Wágner	(Czech Republic)	FW	2012	6 March 1990 (age 36)	Příbram	12	0

Source: iDnes.cz

=== Transfers In ===
No.	Pos.	Nat.	Name	Age	EU	Moving from	Type	Transfer window	Ends	Transfer fee	Source
7	MF	(Czech Republic)	Tomáš Hořava	25	EU	Sigma Olomouc	Transfer	Summer	2017	Undisclosed^{1}	fcviktoria.cz
11	RM	(Czech Republic)	Milan Petržela	30	EU	FC Augsburg (Germany)	Contract termination	Summer	2016	Free	fcviktoria.cz

^{1} Estimated transfer fee is 14M Kč.

=== Loans Out ===
No.	Pos.	Nat.	Name	Age	EU	Moving to	Type	Transfer window	Transfer fee	Source
	LB	(Czech Republic)	Radek Šírl	32	EU	Bohemians 1905	Loan	Summer	N/A	fcviktoria.cz
	MF	(Czech Republic)	Petr Trapp	27	EU	Veria (Greece)	Loan	Summer	N/A	fcviktoria.cz
	DF	(Czech Republic)	Adam Beránek	22	EU	Hradec Králové	Loan	Summer	N/A	fcviktoria.cz
	FW	(Czech Republic)	David Vaněček	21	EU	Hradec Králové	Loan	Summer	N/A	fcviktoria.cz
29	RM	(Czech Republic)	David Štípek	21	EU	Mladá Boleslav	Loan	Summer	N/A	fcviktoria.cz
11	MF	(Czech Republic)	Martin Fillo	27	EU	Brentford (England)	Loan	Summer	N/A	fcviktoria.cz
24	GK	(Czech Republic)	Aleš Mandous	21	EU	Bohemians Prague (Střížkov)	Loan	Summer	N/A	fcviktoria.cz
31	MF	(Czech Republic)	Matěj Kyndl	20	EU	Bohemians Prague (Střížkov)	Loan	Summer	N/A	fcviktoria.cz
	MF	(Slovakia)	Patrik Hrošovský	21	EU	Znojmo	Loan	Summer	N/A	fcviktoria.cz

EU = if holds or not a European Union passport; Country: when 2 flags, 1st flag = country that plays for internationally, 2nd flag = country of birth; N = number on jersey; P = Position (for position name, pause mouse pointer on abbreviation); Name = Name on jersey (for more extensive name, pause mouse pointer on name); Age = age on the day of the signing; Moving from = only indicate the club the player was playing before start playing for this club in this season, for the type of the moving see Status column; Moving to = only indicates the club the player is going to play next, for the type of the moving see Status column; Ends = when the player's current contract ends; n/a = Not applicable.

== Matches ==
=== Friendlies ===
==== Pre-season ====
19 June 2013 Friendly	Doubravka	0–8	Viktoria Plzeň	Plzeň
17:00		Report	16' Trapp; 29' 32' 45' Hora; 40' Tecl; 68' Štípek; 70' Krmenčík; 80' Wágner

22 June 2013 Friendly	Rokycany	2–8	Viktoria Plzeň	Rokycany
10:30	L. Aubrecht 56'; Schneiherr 87'	Report	6' Hořava; 31' Rajtoral; 51' Krmenčík; 72' 75' 80' Wágner; 84' Štípek; 86' (pen.) Hora

28 June 2013 Friendly	Viktoria Plzeň	2–1	Sokolov	Plzeň
18:00	Darida 25'; Krmenčík 75'	Report	53' Hrubý

3 July 2013 Friendly	Fürth (Germany)	1–0	Viktoria Plzeň	Westendorf
16:00	Stieber 13'	Report

6 July 2013 Friendly	Krasnodar (Russia)	2–2	Viktoria Plzeň	Uttendorf
17:30	Koman 42'; Isael 87'	Report	41' Hora; 56' Horváth

9 July 2013 Friendly	Cluj (Romania)	1–4	Viktoria Plzeň
16:00	Costea 56'	Report	3' Petržela; 28' Darida; 45' Kolář; 82' Bakoš

=== Gambrinus liga ===
==== Results summary ====
Overall								Home						Away					
Pld	W	D	L	GF	GA	GD	Pts	W	D	L	GF	GA	GD	W	D	L	GF	GA	GD
30	19	9	2	64	21	+43	66	9	6	0	37	8	+29	10	3	2	27	13	+14

Source: Gambrinus liga

==== League table ====
Pos	Team	Pld	W	D	L	GF	GA	GD	Pts	Qualification or relegation
1	Sparta Prague (C)	30	25	4	1	78	19	+59	79	Qualification for Champions League second qualifying round
2	Viktoria Plzeň	30	19	9	2	64	21	+43	66	Qualification for Europa League third qualifying round (Note: Since the winners of the 2013–14 Czech Cup, Sparta Prague, qualified for European competition based on league position, the spot awarded to the cup winners was passed to the third-placed team, and the spot awarded to the third-placed team was passed to the fourth-placed team.)
3	Mladá Boleslav	30	14	8	8	54	38	+16	50	Qualification for Europa League second qualifying round
4	Slovan Liberec	30	14	6	10	37	46	−9	48	Qualification for Europa League second qualifying round
5	Teplice	30	13	7	10	51	35	+16	46	

Source: Fortuna liga
Rules for classification: 1) points; 2) head-to-head points; 3) head-to-head goal difference; 4) head-to-head goals scored; 5) goal difference; 6) number of goals scored.
(C) Champions

==== Results by round ====
Round	1	2	3	4	5	6	7	8	9	10	11	12	13	14	15	16	17	18	19	20	21	22	23	24	25	26	27	28	29	30
Ground	H	A	H	A	H	A	H	A	H	A	H	A	H	A	A	H	A	H	A	H	A	H	A	H	A	H	A	H	H	A
Result	W	W	W	W	D	W	W	D	D	W	D	L	W	W	W	W	W	W	L	D	W	W	W	D	W	W	D	W	D	D
Position	1	1	1	1	1	1	1	2	2	2	2	3	2	2	2	2	2	2	2	2	2	2	2	2	2	2	2	2	2	2

Updated to match(es) played on 31 May 2014. Source: Matches
A = Away; H = Home; W = Win; D = Draw; L = Loss

==== Matches ====
Win Draw Loss

===== July =====
19 July 2013 Round 1	Viktoria Plzeň	5–0	Bohemians 1905	Plzeň
18:00	Petržela 19'; Čišovský 39'; Kolář 54'; Wágner 66'; Tecl 74' (pen.)	Report	(yellow card) 16' Kalina; (yellow card) 38' Rada; (yellow card) 73' Šmíd	Stadium: Stadion města Plzně; Attendance: 10,145; Referee: J. Jílek

26 July 2013 Round 2	Příbram	2–4	Viktoria Plzeň	Příbram
20:15	Danoski 12' 15' (yellow card) 35'; Pilík (yellow card) 84'	Report	7' Wágner; 45' (pen.) Darida; 76' Procházka; 79' Limberský; (yellow card) 31' Ďuriš	Stadium: Na Litavce; Attendance: 6,316; Referee: T. Kocourek

===== August =====
3 August 2013 Round 3	Viktoria Plzeň	4–0	Ostrava	Plzeň
18:00	Kovařík 26'; Wágner 28'; Hořava 45'; Ďuriš 56'; Hejda (yellow card) 73'	Report	(yellow card) 25' Vomáčka; (yellow card) 34' Kukec	Stadium: Stadion města Plzně; Attendance: 11,108; Referee: P. Franěk

11 August 2013 Round 4	Znojmo	0–1	Viktoria Plzeň	Brno
19:00	Heinz (yellow card) 28'; Yonov (yellow card) 58'; Nepožitek (yellow card) 82'	Report	56' Darida; (yellow card) 59' Rajtoral	Stadium: Městský stadion Attendance: 4,680; Referee: J. Jech

17 August 2013 Round 5	Viktoria Plzeň	0–0	Sparta Prague	Plzeň
20:15	Ďuriš (yellow card) 85'	Report	(yellow card) 65' Nhamoinesu; (yellow card) 86' Hušbauer	Stadium: Stadion města Plzně; Attendance: 11,360; Referee: R. Příhoda

24 August 2013 Round 6	Slovácko	1–3	Viktoria Plzeň	Uherské Hradiště
20:15	Valenta 68'; Daníček (yellow card) 44'; Trousil (yellow card) 74'	Report	41' Kovařík; 61' Ďuriš; 70' Tecl; (yellow card) 39' Limberský; (yellow card) 86' Hořava	Stadium: Městský fotbalový stadion Attendance: 7,096; Referee: M. Zelinka

===== September =====
1 September 2013 Round 7	Viktoria Plzeň	3–2	Olomouc	Plzeň
19:00	Kolář 1'; Rajtoral 9'; Hejda 64'; Petržela (yellow card) 73'	Report	61' Šindelář; 71' Doležal; (yellow card) 33' Vidlička; (yellow card) 84' Lietava	Stadium: Stadion města Plzně; Attendance: 11,722; Referee: K. Hrubeš

13 September 2013 Round 8	Liberec	1–1	Viktoria Plzeň	Liberec
20:15	Kováč 78'	Report	8' Kolář	Stadium: Stadion u Nisy; Attendance: 6,412; Referee: P. Královec

21 September 2013 Round 9	Viktoria Plzeň	0–0	Dukla Prague	Plzeň
20:15		Report		Stadium: Stadion města Plzně; Attendance: 9,050; Referee: P. Franěk

27 September 2013 Round 10	Vysočina Jihlava	1–2	Viktoria Plzeň	Jihlava
20:15	Harba 16'	Report	10' Rajtoral; 79' Bakoš	Stadium: Stadion v Jiráskově ulici Attendance: 4,132; Referee: Z. Proske

===== October =====
19 October 2013 Round 11	Viktoria Plzeň	1–1	Slavia Prague	Plzeň
20:15	Rajtoral 60'	Report	30' Juhar	Stadium: Stadion města Plzně; Attendance: 10,834; Referee: J. Jílek

27 October 2013 Round 12	Teplice	1–0	Viktoria Plzeň	Teplice
19:00	Nivaldo 72'	Report		Stadium: Na Stínadlech; Attendance: 16,180; Referee: J. Jech

===== November =====
1 November 2013 Round 13	Viktoria Plzeň	6–1	Jablonec	Plzeň
20:15	Horváth 16', 68'; Tecl 23', 45'; Kolář 55'; Wágner 86'	Report	12' Piták	Stadium: Stadion města Plzně; Attendance: 9,180; Referee: M. Zelinka

9 November 2013 Round 14	Mladá Boleslav	1–2	Viktoria Plzeň	Mladá Boleslav
20:15	Nešpor 4'	Report	14' Petržela; 69' Čišovský	Stadium: Městský stadion Attendance: 4,877; Referee: K. Hrubeš

22 November 2013 Round 15	Brno	1–3	Viktoria Plzeň	Brno
20:15	Skalák 4'	Report	45' (pen.) Horváth; 60' 84' Tecl	Stadium: Městský stadion Attendance: 5,839; Referee: P. Franěk

===== December =====
1 December 2013 Round 16	Viktoria Plzeň	2–0	Příbram	Plzeň
19:00	Horváth 21'; Petržela 30'	Report		Stadium: Stadion města Plzně; Attendance: 9,510; Referee: O. Lerch

===== February =====
23 February 2014 Round 17	Ostrava	1 – 2	Viktoria Plzeň	Ostrava
15:00	Svěrkoš 81'	Report	24' 56' Tecl	Stadium: Bazaly; Attendance: 10,127; Referee: T. Kocourek

===== March =====
2 March 2014 Round 18	Viktoria Plzeň	3–2	Znojmo	Plzeň
19:00	Kolář 19'; Wágner 52' 56'	Report	74' Vašíček; 90' Reljić	Stadium: Stadion města Plzně; Attendance: 10,187; Referee: J. Jílek

9 March 2013 Round 19	Sparta Prague	1–0	Viktoria Plzeň	Prague
20:00	Přikryl 8'	Report		Stadium: Generali Arena; Attendance: 18,712; Referee: J. Jech

16 March 2013 Round 20	Viktoria Plzeň	0–0	Slovácko	Plzeň
19:00		Report		Stadium: Stadion města Plzně; Attendance: 8,525; Referee: K. Hrubeš

23 March 2013 Round 21	Olomouc	1–2	Viktoria Plzeň	Olomouc
17:00	Rolinc 9'	Report	65' Kolář; 78' Wágner	Stadium: Andrův stadion Referee: R. Příhoda

===== April =====
5 April 2014 Round 23	Dukla Prague	0–3	Viktoria Plzeň	Prague
20:15		Report	18' Tecl; 50' Kolář; 59' Petržela	Stadium: Stadion Juliska; Attendance: 3,250; Referee: P. Franěk

13 April 2014 Round 24	Viktoria Plzeň	1–1	Vysočina Jihlava	Plzeň
15:00	Ďuriš 46'	Report	82' Mešanović	Stadium: Stadion města Plzně; Attendance: 10,846; Referee: P. Královec

21 April 2014 Round 25	Slavia Prague	0–2	Viktoria Plzeň	Prague
16:30		Report	45' Kovařík; 90' Wágner	Stadium: Eden Arena; Attendance: 7,742; Referee: Z. Proske

25 April 2014 Round 26	Viktoria Plzeň	3–0	Teplice	Plzeň
20:15	Petržela 35'; Ďuriš 66'; Končal 90'	Report		Stadium: Stadion města Plzně; Attendance: 9,873; Referee: T. Kocourek

===== May =====
4 May 2014 Round 27	Jablonec	2–2	Viktoria Plzeň	Jablonec nad Nisou
19:00	Kopic 27' 87'	Report	45' Tecl; 88' Hrošovský	Stadium: Chance Arena; Attendance: 2,913; Referee: M. Nenadál

11 May 2014 Round 28	Viktoria Plzeň	2–0	Mladá Boleslav	Plzeň
17:00	Končal 53'; Tecl 84'	Report		Stadium: Stadion města Plzně; Attendance: 9,744; Referee: R. Příhoda

25 April 2014 Round 29	Viktoria Plzeň	1–1	Brno	Plzeň
18:00	Tecl 26'	Report	40' Schuster	Stadium: Stadion města Plzně; Attendance: 10,267; Referee: P. Franěk

31 May 2014 Round 30	Bohemians 1905	0–0	Viktoria Plzeň	Prague
18:00		Report		Stadium: Ďolíček; Attendance: 5,000; Referee: K. Hrubeš

=== Czech Supercup ===
As winners of the previous season's Gambrinus liga, Plzeň played defending cup winners FK Jablonec in the Czech Supercup on 12 July. Plzeň's manager Pavel Vrba left many key players on the bench before the first leg of the second qualifying round of Champions League, which was four days later.

Plzeň took an early lead and despite other chances, the first half ended 1–0. During the second half, Jablonec were the better team and scored two goals in a six-minute spell to take the lead. In the 89th minute Tomáš Wágner from Plzeň had a disallowed goal because of offside. In stoppage time Jablonec scored their third goal and although three minutes later Plzeň scored, the match finished 2–3.

12 July 2013 Final	Viktoria Plzeň	2–3	Jablonec	Plzeň
17:45	Wágner 5' 90+5'; Kovařík (yellow card) 65'; Procházka (yellow card) 70'; Darida (yellow card) 80'; Řezník (yellow card) 83'	Report	57' Beneš; 63' Hubník; 90+3' Kopic; (yellow card) 53' Piták; (yellow card) 76' Loučka	Stadium: Doosan Arena; Attendance: 4,516; Referee: M. Zelinka

=== UEFA Champions League ===
Plzeň came through three qualifying rounds including the playoff round before reaching the group stage. The club lost all of their first five group stage matches. In the final group stage match, losing 1–0 to CSKA Moscow at home with 76 minutes played, CSKA had two players sent off and Plzeň scored two goals as the match finished 2–1. This result qualified them for the Europa League.

==== Second qualifying round ====
16 July 2013 First leg	Viktoria Plzeň (Czech Republic)	4–3	(Bosnia and Herzegovina) Željezničar	Plzeň, Czech Republic
17:30	Čišovský 63'; Kolář 66' 76'; Rajtoral 81'; Horváth (yellow card) 77'	Report	52' (yellow card) 90' Tomić; 78' (yellow card) 61' Selimović; 85' (yellow card) 83' Bučan; (yellow card) 25' Jamak; (yellow card) 72' Urdinov	Stadium: Doosan Arena; Attendance: 10,381; Referee: César Muñiz Fernández (Spain)

23 July 2013 Second leg	Željezničar (Bosnia and Herzegovina)	1–2 (4–6 agg.)	(Czech Republic) Viktoria Plzeň	Sarajevo, Bosnia and Herzegovina
21:00	Jamak 45' (yellow card) 31'; Urdinov (yellow card) 51'; Selimović (yellow card) 57'	Report	5' Wágner; 30' Petržela; (red card) 21' Procházka; (yellow card) 31' Kolář; (yellow card) 43' Horváth; (yellow card) 86' Řezník	Stadium: Asim Ferhatović Hase Stadium; Attendance: 25,000; Referee: João Capela (Portugal)

==== Third qualifying round ====
30 July 2013 First leg	Nõmme Kalju (Estonia)	0–4	(Czech Republic) Viktoria Plzeň	Tallinn, Estonia
18:00	Ceesay (yellow card) 31'	Report	2' 52' (yellow card) 45' Čišovský; 77' Ďuriš; 90' Hejda; (yellow card) 12' Darida; (yellow card) 28' Limberský	Stadium: Kadriorg Stadium; Attendance: 4,420; Referee: Andre Marriner (England)

7 August 2013 Second leg	Viktoria Plzeň (Czech Republic)	6–2 (10–2 agg.)	(Estonia) Nõmme Kalju	Plzeň, Czech Republic
20:15	Horváth 20' (pen.) 44' 62'; Tecl 58'; Hořava 71'; Wágner 82'; Řezník (yellow card) 49'	Report	10' 69' (yellow card) 35' Quintieri; (yellow card) 20' Šišov	Stadium: Doosan Arena; Attendance: 9,482; Referee: Stefan Johannesson (Sweden)

==== Play off round ====
20 August 2013 First leg	Viktoria Plzeň (Czech Republic)	3–1	(Slovenia) Maribor	Plzeň, Czech Republic
20:45	Čišovský 8'; Darida 58'; Ďuriš 89'	Report	Mejač 66'	Stadium: Doosan Arena; Attendance: 11,158; Referee: Olegário Benquerença (Portugal)

28 August 2013 Second leg	Maribor (Slovenia)	0–1 (1–4 agg.)	(Czech Republic) Viktoria Plzeň	Maribor, Slovenia
20:45		Report	Tecl 3'	Stadium: Ljudski vrt Attendance: 12,306; Referee: Felix Brych (Germany)

==== Group stage ====
Pos	Team	Pld	W	D	L	GF	GA	GD	Pts	Qualification	BAY	MCI	PLZ	CSKA
1	(Germany) Bayern Munich	6	5	0	1	17	5	+12	15 (Note: Tied on head-to-head points (3). Head-to-head goal difference: Bayern Munich +1, Manchester City −1.)	Advance to knockout phase	—	2–3	5–0	3–0
2	(England) Manchester City	6	5	0	1	18	10	+8	15	Advance to knockout phase	1–3	—	4–2	5–2
3	(Czech Republic) Viktoria Plzeň	6	1	0	5	6	17	−11	3 (Note: Tied on head-to-head points (3) and head-to-head goal difference (0). Head-to-head away goals: Viktoria Plzeň 2, CSKA Moscow 1.)	Transfer to Europa League	0–1	0–3	—	2–1
4	(Russia) CSKA Moscow	6	1	0	5	8	17	−9	3		1–3	1–2	3–2	—

Source: UEFA
Notes:

17 September 2013 1	Viktoria Plzeň (Czech Republic)	0–3	(England) Manchester City	Plzeň, Czech Republic
20:45 CEST (UTC+2)	Limberský (yellow card) 40'	Report	Kolarov (yellow card) 17'; Fernandinho (yellow card) 28'; Džeko 48'; Touré 53'; Agüero 58'	Stadium: Doosan Arena; Attendance: 11,281; Referee: Paolo Tagliavento (Italy)

2 October 2013 2	CSKA Moscow (Russia)	3–2	(Czech Republic) Viktoria Plzeň	Saint Petersburg, Russia
20:00 MSK (UTC+4)	Tošić 19'; Honda 29'; Řezník 78' (o.g.)	Report	Rajtoral 4'; Hořava (yellow card) 22'; Tecl (yellow card) 76'; Bakoš 90+1'	Stadium: Petrovsky Stadium (Note: The match was moved to Petrovsky Stadium, Saint Petersburg due to the poor quality of the pitch at Arena Khimki, Khimki.); Attendance: 6,135; Referee: Bas Nijhuis (Netherlands)

23 October 2013 3	Bayern Munich (Germany)	5–0	(Czech Republic) Viktoria Plzeň	Munich, Germany
20:45 CEST (UTC+2)	Ribéry 25' (pen.), 61'; Alaba 37'; Schweinsteiger 64'; Götze 90+1'	Report	Hubník (yellow card) 24'; Limberský (yellow card) 48'; Kozáčik (yellow card) 86'	Stadium: Allianz Arena; Attendance: 68,000; Referee: Alan Kelly (Ireland)

5 November 2013 4	Viktoria Plzeň (Czech Republic)	0–1	(Germany) Bayern Munich	Plzeň, Czech Republic
20:45 CET (UTC+1)	Hubník (yellow card) 32'; Kolář (yellow card) 62'; Horváth (yellow card) 69'	Report	Mandžukić 65'	Stadium: Doosan Arena; Attendance: 11,360; Referee: Antonio Mateu Lahoz (Spain)

27 November 2013 5	Manchester City (England)	4–2	(Czech Republic) Viktoria Plzeň	Manchester, England
19:45 GMT (UTC+0)	Agüero 33' (pen.); Milner (yellow card) 40'; Nasri 65'; Demichelis (yellow card) 72'; Negredo 78'; Džeko 89'; Touré (yellow card) 90+2'	Report	Hořava 43'; Čišovský (yellow card) 49'; Tecl 69'	Stadium: City of Manchester Stadium; Attendance: 37,742; Referee: Fırat Aydınus (Turkey)

10 December 2013 6	Viktoria Plzeň (Czech Republic)	2–1	(Russia) CSKA Moscow	Plzeň, Czech Republic
20:45 CET (UTC+1)	Procházka (yellow card) 25'; Kolář 76'; Wágner 90'; Bakoš (yellow card) 90+2'	Report	Musa 65'; Dzagoev (red card) 67'; Shchennikov (yellow card) 79'; Honda (yellow card) 90'; Wernbloom (yellow card) 90+1' (red card) 90+3'	Stadium: Doosan Arena; Attendance: 11,205; Referee: Damir Skomina (Slovenia)

=== UEFA Europa League ===
==== Knockout phase ====
===== Round of 32 =====
20 February 2014 First leg	Viktoria Plzeň (Czech Republic)	1–1	(Ukraine) Shakhtar Donetsk	Plzeň, Czech Republic
21:05 CET (UTC+1)	Petržela (yellow card) 32'; Tecl 62'; Horváth (yellow card) 76'; Limberský (yellow card) 88'; Procházka (yellow card) 90+2'	Report	Douglas Costa (yellow card) 34'; Hübschman (yellow card) 54'; Rakytskiy (yellow card) 58'; Luiz Adriano 64'	Stadium: Doosan Arena; Attendance: 11,179; Referee: Anastasios Sidiropoulos (Greece)

27 February 2014 Second leg	Shakhtar Donetsk (Ukraine)	1–2 (2–3 agg.)	(Czech Republic) Viktoria Plzeň	Donetsk, Ukraine
20:00 EET (UTC+2)	Ilsinho (yellow card) 57'; Kryvtsov (yellow card) 60'; Luiz Adriano (yellow card) 61', (goal) 88'	Report	Kolář 29'; Petržela 33', (yellow card) 45+1'	Stadium: Donbas Arena; Attendance: 36,729; Referee: Pol van Boekel (Netherlands)
Note: Viktoria Plzeň won 3–2 on aggregate.

===== Round of 16 =====
13 March 2014 First leg	Lyon (France)	4–1	(Czech Republic) Viktoria Plzeň	Lyon, France
21:05 CET (UTC+1)	Fofana 12', 70'; Biševac (yellow card) 20'; Lacazette 53'; Gonalons (yellow card) 60'; Mvuemba 61'	Report	Hořava 2'; Kolář (yellow card) 29'; Hubník (yellow card) 50'; Kovařík (yellow card) 60'	Stadium: Stade de Gerland; Attendance: 28,248; Referee: Antonio Mateu Lahoz (Spain)

20 March 2014 Second leg	Viktoria Plzeň (Czech Republic)	2–1 (3–5 agg.)	(France) Lyon	Plzeň, Czech Republic
19:00 CET (UTC+1)	Limberský (yellow card) 9'; Kolář 60'; Tecl 62', (penalty missed) 70'; Čišovský (yellow card) 81'	Report	Lopes (yellow card) 40'; Gomis 45+2'; Briand (yellow card) 90+1'	Stadium: Doosan Arena; Attendance: 10,352; Referee: Szymon Marciniak (Poland)
Note: Lyon won 5–3 on aggregate.
