= 2008 UEFA European Under-19 Championship squads =

Player listings in youth football competition

Players born on or after 1 January 1989 were eligible to participate in the tournament. Players' age as of 14 July 2008 – the tournament's opening day. Players in bold have later been capped at full international level.

== Group A ==
=== Bulgaria ===
Head coach: (Bulgaria) Mihail Madanski

No.	Pos.	Player	Date of birth (age)	Caps	Club
1	GK	Ivan Karadzhov	12 July 1989 (aged 19)		(Bulgaria) CSKA Sofia
2	DF	**Tsvetomir Panov**	17 April 1989 (aged 19)		(Bulgaria) Spartak Pleven
3	DF	Milcho Makendzhiev	31 October 1989 (aged 18)		(Bulgaria) Lokomotiv Mezdra
4	DF	Daniel Zlatkov	6 March 1989 (aged 19)		(Bulgaria) Pirin Blagoevgrad
5	DF	Kristiyan Uzunov	4 February 1989 (aged 19)		(Bulgaria) CSKA Sofia
6	FW	Aleksandar Kirov	25 October 1990 (aged 17)		(Bulgaria) Levski Sofia
7	MF	**Mihail Aleksandrov**	11 June 1989 (aged 19)		(Germany) Borussia Dortmund
8	MF	**Stefan Velev**	2 May 1989 (aged 19)		(Bulgaria) Lokomotiv Stara Zagora
9	FW	**Radoslav Vasilev**	12 October 1990 (aged 17)		(England) Reading
10	MF	Daniel Dimov	21 January 1989 (aged 19)		(Bulgaria) Cherno More Varna
11	FW	Branimir Kostadinov	4 March 1989 (aged 19)		(Scotland) Heart of Midlothian
12	GK	Petar Denchev	16 March 1989 (aged 19)		(Bulgaria) Spartak Plovdiv
13	DF	Kostadin Gadzhalov	20 July 1989 (aged 18)		(Bulgaria) Botev Plovdiv
14	MF	Todor Kolev	22 September 1989 (aged 18)		(Bulgaria) Cherno More Varna
15	MF	Ivan Tsachev	18 January 1989 (aged 19)		(Bulgaria) Levski Sofia
16	FW	Ismail Isa	26 June 1989 (aged 19)		(Bulgaria) Levski Sofia
17	FW	Momchil Tsvetanov	12 March 1990 (aged 18)		(Bulgaria) Litex Lovech
18	MF	**Atanas Zehirov**	13 February 1989 (aged 19)		(Bulgaria) CSKA Sofia

=== Hungary ===
Head coach: (Hungary) Tibor Sisa

No.	Pos.	Player	Date of birth (age)	Caps	Club
1	GK	**Péter Gulácsi**	6 May 1990 (aged 18)		(England) Liverpool
2	DF	Attila Busai	21 January 1989 (aged 19)		(Hungary) MTK
3	MF	**Zsolt Korcsmár**	9 January 1989 (aged 19)		(Hungary) Újpest
4	DF	Dániel Lengyel	1 March 1989 (aged 19)		(Hungary) MTK
5	DF	**András Debreceni**	21 April 1989 (aged 19)		(Hungary) Budapest Honvéd
6	DF	András Gál	20 April 1989 (aged 19)		(Hungary) MTK
7	MF	**Vladimir Koman**	16 March 1989 (aged 19)		(Italy) Sampdoria
8	FW	András Simon	30 March 1990 (aged 18)		(England) Liverpool
9	FW	**Krisztián Németh**	5 January 1989 (aged 19)		(England) Liverpool
10	FW	Márk Nikházi	2 February 1989 (aged 19)		(Hungary) MTK
11	MF	László Szabó	7 February 1989 (aged 19)		(Hungary) MTK
12	GK	Péter Pokorni	21 November 1989 (aged 18)		(Hungary) Paks
13	DF	Adrián Szekeres	21 April 1989 (aged 19)		(Hungary) MTK
14	DF	Ádám Présinger	26 January 1989 (aged 19)		(Hungary) Integrál-DAC
15	MF	Bence Iszlai	29 May 1990 (aged 18)		(Hungary) Veszprém
16	FW	Bálint Bajner	18 November 1990 (aged 17)		(England) West Ham United
17	MF	András Gosztonyi	7 November 1990 (aged 17)		(Hungary) MTK
18	MF	Olivér Nagy	3 January 1989 (aged 19)		(Hungary) Újpest

=== Germany ===
Head coach: (Germany) Horst Hrubesch

No.	Pos.	Player	Date of birth (age)	Caps	Club
1	GK	Tom Mickel	19 April 1989 (aged 19)		(Germany) Energie Cottbus
2	DF	Dennis Diekmeier	20 October 1989 (aged 18)		(Germany) Werder Bremen
3	DF	Björn Kopplin	7 January 1989 (aged 19)		(Germany) Bayern Munich
4	DF	**Stefan Reinartz**	1 January 1989 (aged 19)		(Germany) Bayer Leverkusen
5	DF	Florian Jungwirth	27 January 1989 (aged 19)		(Germany) 1860 Munich
6	MF	**Sven Bender**	27 April 1989 (aged 19)		(Germany) 1860 Munich
7	MF	Deniz Naki	9 July 1989 (aged 19)		(Germany) Bayer Leverkusen
8	MF	**Lars Bender**	27 April 1989 (aged 19)		(Germany) 1860 Munich
9	FW	Richard Sukuta-Pasu	24 June 1990 (aged 18)		(Germany) Bayer Leverkusen
10	FW	Timo Gebhart	12 April 1989 (aged 19)		(Germany) 1860 Munich
11	FW	Savio Nsereko	27 July 1989 (aged 18)		(Italy) Brescia
12	GK	**Ron-Robert Zieler**	12 February 1989 (aged 19)		(England) Manchester United
13	MF	Marcel Risse	17 December 1989 (aged 18)		(Germany) Bayer Leverkusen
14	DF	**Ömer Toprak**	21 July 1989 (aged 18)		(Germany) SC Freiburg
15	MF	Danny Latza	7 December 1989 (aged 18)		(Germany) Schalke 04
16	MF	**Mario Vrančić**	23 May 1989 (aged 19)		(Germany) Mainz 05
17	MF	Bastian Oczipka	12 January 1989 (aged 19)		(Germany) Bayer Leverkusen
18	FW	Rahman Soyudoğru	6 January 1989 (aged 19)		(Germany) SC Freiburg

=== Spain ===
Head coach: (Spain) Ginés Meléndez

No.	Pos.	Player	Date of birth (age)	Caps	Club
1	GK	Tomás Mejías	30 January 1989 (aged 19)		(Spain) Real Madrid
2	MF	**César Azpilicueta**	28 August 1989 (aged 18)		(Spain) Osasuna
3	DF	Chema Antón	19 March 1989 (aged 19)		(Spain) Real Madrid
4	DF	César Ortiz	30 January 1989 (aged 19)		(Spain) Atlético Madrid
5	DF	Víctor Ruiz	25 January 1989 (aged 19)		(Spain) Espanyol
6	MF	**Ignacio Camacho**	4 May 1990 (aged 18)		(Spain) Atlético Madrid
7	DF	Lillo	27 March 1989 (aged 19)		(Spain) Murcia
8	MF	**Dani Parejo**	16 April 1989 (aged 19)		(Spain) Real Madrid Castilla
9	FW	**Emilio Nsue**	30 September 1989 (aged 18)		(Spain) Mallorca
10	FW	Aarón	26 April 1989 (aged 19)		(Spain) Valencia
11	FW	Dani Aquino	27 July 1990 (aged 17)		(Spain) Real Murcia
12	DF	**Álvaro Domínguez**	15 May 1989 (aged 19)		(Spain) Atlético Madrid
13	GK	**David de Gea**	7 November 1990 (aged 17)		(Spain) Atlético Madrid
14	DF	**Mikel San José**	30 May 1989 (aged 19)		(England) Liverpool
15	MF	Miguel Ángel Luque	23 July 1990 (aged 17)		(Spain) Villarreal
16	MF	Fran Mérida	4 March 1990 (aged 18)		(England) Arsenal
17	MF	**Jordi Alba**	21 March 1989 (aged 19)		(Spain) Valencia
18	FW	**Iván Bolado**	3 July 1989 (aged 19)		(Spain) Racing de Santander
19	DF	Alberto Morgado	10 March 1990 (aged 18)		(Spain) Real Sociedad

== Group B ==
=== Czech Republic ===
Head coach: (Czech Republic) Jakub Dovalil

No.	Pos.	Player	Date of birth (age)	Caps	Club
1	GK	**Tomáš Vaclík**	29 March 1989 (aged 19)		(Czech Republic) Vítkovice
2	DF	Miroslav Štěpánek	15 January 1990 (aged 18)		(Germany) Hamburger SV
3	DF	Jan Polák	26 March 1989 (aged 19)		(Czech Republic) Slovan Liberec
4	MF	Martin Zeman	28 March 1989 (aged 19)		(Czech Republic) Sparta Prague
5	MF	Jan Hable	4 January 1989 (aged 19)		(Italy) Fiorentina
6	DF	Roman Brunclík	13 March 1989 (aged 19)		(Czech Republic) Baník Ostrava
7	MF	Jan Vošahlík	8 March 1989 (aged 19)		(Czech Republic) Zenit Čáslav
8	MF	**Jan Morávek**	1 November 1989 (aged 18)		(Czech Republic) Bohemians 1905
9	MF	Tomáš Nuc	9 March 1989 (aged 19)		(Czech Republic) Sigma Olomouc
10	FW	**Tomáš Necid**	13 August 1989 (aged 18)		(Czech Republic) Jablonec 97
11	FW	**Libor Kozák**	30 May 1989 (aged 19)		(Italy) Lazio
12	MF	Petr Reinberk	25 May 1989 (aged 19)		(Czech Republic) Slovácko
13	MF	Jan Lecjaks	9 August 1990 (aged 17)		(Czech Republic) Viktoria Plzeň
14	DF	**Radim Řezník**	20 January 1989 (aged 19)		(Czech Republic) Baník Ostrava
15	DF	Jakub Heidenreich	27 April 1989 (aged 19)		(Czech Republic) Sigma Olomouc
16	GK	Michal Bárta	23 December 1989 (aged 18)		(Czech Republic) Sigma Olomouc
17	MF	Petr Wojnar	12 January 1989 (aged 19)		(Czech Republic) Baník Ostrava
18	MF	**Lukáš Mareček**	17 April 1990 (aged 18)		(Czech Republic) Brno

=== England ===
Head coach: (England) Brian Eastick

No.	Pos.	Player	Date of birth (age)	Caps	Club
1	GK	David Button	27 February 1989 (aged 19)		(England) Tottenham Hotspur
2	DF	**Jack Cork**	26 June 1989 (aged 19)		(England) Chelsea
3	DF	Joe Mattock	15 May 1990 (aged 18)		(England) Leicester City
4	MF	Dan Gosling	1 February 1990 (aged 18)		(England) Everton
5	DF	James Tomkins	29 March 1989 (aged 19)		(England) West Ham United
6	DF	Krystian Pearce	5 January 1990 (aged 18)		(England) Birmingham City
7	FW	Scott Sinclair	25 March 1989 (aged 19)		(England) Chelsea
8	MF	**Kieran Gibbs**	26 September 1989 (aged 18)		(England) Arsenal
9	FW	**Daniel Sturridge**	1 September 1989 (aged 18)		(England) Manchester City
10	FW	Freddie Sears	27 November 1989 (aged 18)		(England) West Ham United
11	MF	**Danny Rose**	2 July 1990 (aged 18)		(England) Tottenham Hotspur
12	DF	**Ryan Bertrand**	5 August 1990 (aged 17)		(England) Chelsea
13	GK	Jason Steele	18 August 1990 (aged 17)		(England) Middlesbrough
14	MF	**Victor Moses**	12 December 1990 (aged 17)		(England) Crystal Palace
15	MF	Jamie Chandler	24 March 1989 (aged 19)		(England) Sunderland
16	MF	**Fabian Delph**	21 November 1989 (aged 18)		(England) Leeds United
17	DF	Ben Mee	6 July 1990 (aged 18)		(England) Manchester City
18	FW	Tope Obadeyi	29 October 1989 (aged 18)		(England) Bolton Wanderers

=== Greece ===
Head coach: (Greece) Alexis Alexiou

No.	Pos.	Player	Date of birth (age)	Caps	Club
1	GK	Dean Bouzanis	2 October 1990 (aged 17)		(England) Liverpool
2	DF	Nikos Barboudis	6 March 1989 (aged 19)		(Greece) AEK Athens
3	DF	Vasilis Lambropoulos	31 March 1990 (aged 18)		(Greece) Olympiacos
4	MF	**Kyriakos Papadopoulos**	23 February 1992 (aged 16)		(Greece) Olympiacos
5	DF	Nikos Boutzikos	6 September 1989 (aged 18)		(Greece) Panathinaikos
6	MF	Savvas Gentsoglou	19 September 1990 (aged 17)		(Greece) AEK Athens
7	MF	**Sotiris Ninis**	3 April 1990 (aged 18)		(Greece) Panathinaikos
8	FW	Michalis Kyrgias	14 October 1989 (aged 18)		(Greece) Atromitos
9	FW	Lefteris Matsoukas	7 March 1990 (aged 18)		(Germany) Werder Bremen II
10	MF	Sotiris Stratakis	30 March 1989 (aged 19)		(Germany) Borussia Dortmund
11	FW	Michalis Pavlis	22 September 1989 (aged 18)		(Greece) AEK Athens
12	GK	Nikos Babaniotis	28 June 1989 (aged 19)		(Greece) Panetolikos
13	DF	Leonidas Argyropoulos	29 May 1990 (aged 18)		(Greece) Korinthos
14	DF	Vangelis Galanis	7 September 1989 (aged 18)		(Greece) Kavala
15	MF	Stergios Psianos	12 September 1990 (aged 17)		(Greece) Apollon Kalamarias
16	MF	**Giannis Papadopoulos**	9 March 1989 (aged 19)		(Greece) Olympiacos
17	MF	Thodoris Karapetsas	25 January 1990 (aged 18)		(Switzerland) Grasshopper
18	FW	**Apostolos Giannou**	25 January 1990 (aged 18)		(Greece) Apollon Kalamarias

=== Italy ===
Head coach: (Italy) Francesco Rocca

No.	Pos.	Player	Date of birth (age)	Caps	Club
1	GK	Vincenzo Fiorillo	13 January 1990 (aged 18)		(Italy) Sampdoria
2	DF	**Matteo Darmian**	2 December 1989 (aged 18)		(Italy) Milan
3	DF	Matteo Bruscagin	3 August 1989 (aged 18)		(Italy) Monza
4	MF	Silvano Raggio Garibaldi	27 March 1989 (aged 19)		(Italy) Genoa
5	DF	Massimiliano Tagliani	4 April 1989 (aged 19)		(Italy) Fiorentina
6	DF	Matteo Gentili	21 August 1989 (aged 18)		(Italy) Atalanta
7	FW	Alberto Paloschi	4 January 1990 (aged 18)		(Italy) Milan
8	MF	Andrea Mazzarani	6 November 1989 (aged 18)		(Italy) Cisco Roma
9	FW	**Stefano Okaka**	9 August 1989 (aged 18)		(Italy) Roma
10	FW	Fernando Forestieri	15 January 1990 (aged 18)		(Italy) Siena
11	FW	Umberto Eusepi	9 January 1989 (aged 19)		(Italy) Genoa
12	GK	Carlo Pinsoglio	16 March 1990 (aged 18)		(Italy) Juventus
13	DF	Giovanni Formiconi	14 December 1989 (aged 18)		(Italy) Udinese
14	DF	Michelangelo Albertazzi	7 January 1991 (aged 17)		(Italy) Bologna
15	MF	**Andrea Poli**	29 September 1989 (aged 18)		(Italy) Sampdoria
16	MF	**Giacomo Bonaventura**	22 August 1989 (aged 18)		(Italy) Atalanta
17	DF	Domenico Marchetti	7 August 1990 (aged 17)		(Italy) Real Montecchio
18	FW	Fabio Zamblera	7 April 1990 (aged 18)		(England) Newcastle United
