= Lisowski =

Lisowski, Lisowsky, Lisovsky or Lisovski is a surname with variants in multiple languages.

Language	Masculine	Feminine	Plural
Belarusian (Romanization)	Лісоўскі (Lisoŭski)	Лісоўская (Lisoŭskaja, Lisouskaya, Lisouskaia)	
Latvian	Lisovskis	Lisovska	
Lithuanian	Lisauskas	Lisauskienė (married); Lisauskaitė (unmarried)	
Polish	Lisowski ([liˈsɔfski])	Lisowska ([liˈsɔfska])	Lisowscy ([liˈsɔfst͡sɨ])
Russian (Romanization)	Лисовский (Lisovsky, Lisovskiy, Lisovskij)	Лисовская (Lisovskaya, Lisovskaia, Lisovskaja)	
Ukrainian (Romanization)	Лісовський (Lisovskyi, Lisovskyy, Lisovskyj)	Лісовська (Lisovska)	

== People ==
- Aleksandra or Anastasia Lisowska, possible birth names of Hurrem Sultan (c. 1502–1558), wife of Suleiman the Magnificent
- Aleksander Józef Lisowski (c. 1580–1616), Polish-Lithuanian noble
- Elwira Lisowska (born 1930), Polish immunologist
- Ewelina Lisowska, Polish singer, songwriter and vocal producer
- Jack Lisowski (born 1991), English professional snooker player
- Jan Lisowski (born 1952), Polish weightlifter who competed at the 1980 Summer Olympics
- Michel Adam Lisowski (born 1950), a Jewish Polish-French businessman
- Paweł Lisowski (born 1991), Polish footballer
- Reginald Lisowski (1926–2005), American professional wrestler
- Robert Lisovskyi (1893–1982), Ukrainian artist and graphic designer
- Stan Lisowski (1933–2015), ring name of Canadian professional wrestler, Stan Holek
- Tomasz Lisowski (born 1985), Polish footballer (defender)
- William Lisowsky (1892–1959), Ukrainian-Canadian politician
- Wojciech Lisowski (born 1992), Polish footballer

== See also ==
- Wola Lisowska, a village in the administrative district of Gmina Lubartów
