= Bulgaria national under-19 football team =

Bulgarian national under 19 football team

Bulgaria U-19
- Nickname: The Young Lions
- Association: Bulgarian Football Union
- Confederation: UEFA (Europe)
- Head coach: Atanas Ribarski
- Captain: Kubrat Onasci
- FIFA code: BUL
First colours	Second colours

The Bulgaria national under-19 football team is the national under-19 football team of Bulgaria and is controlled by the Bulgarian Football Union. The team competes in the European Under-19 Football Championship, held every year.

== Competition results ==
Champions Runners-Up Semi-Finals Other Top Results

=== Balkan Youth Championship ===
Year	Rank
(Greece) 1968	Champions
(Bulgaria) 1970	Champions
(Socialist Federal Republic of Yugoslavia) 1973	Champions

=== UEFA U-19 European Championship ===
Year	Rank
(Bulgaria) 1959	Champions
(England) 1963	Semi-Finals
(France) 1968	Semi-Finals
(Germany) 1969	Champions
(Italy) 1973	Champions
(Sweden) 1974	Semi-Finals
(Belgium) 1977	Runners-Up
(Austria) 1979	Runners-Up
(Socialist Federal Republic of Yugoslavia) 1986	Quarter-Finals

=== FIFA U-19 World Championship ===
Year	Rank
(Soviet Union) 1985	Quarter-Finals
(Chile) 1987	Quarter-Finals

== Players ==
=== Current squad ===
The following players were called up for friendly matches against Albania on 4 and 7 June 2026.

No.	Pos.	Player	Date of birth (age)	Club
1	GK	Plamen Penev	22 April 2008 (age 18)	(Italian Football Federation) Lecce
12	GK	Ognyan Vladimirov	24 January 2008 (age 18)	(Bulgarian Football Union) Levski Sofia
5	DF	Valeri Vladimirov	5 June 2008 (age 18)	(Italian Football Federation) AC Milan
6	DF	Aleks Tunchev	19 December 2008 (age 17)	(Bulgarian Football Union) CSKA Sofia
15	DF	Daniel Kirilov	28 September 2008 (age 18)	(Bulgarian Football Union) Marek
4	DF	Radoslav Palazov	4 March 2008 (age 18)	(Bulgarian Football Union) Lokomotiv Plovdiv
3	DF	Emanuil Nyagolov	17 August 2008 (age 18)	(Bulgarian Football Union) Cherno More
2	DF	Borislav Stoichkov	23 February 2008 (age 18)	(Bulgarian Football Union) Septemvri Sofia
20	MF	Kaloyan Bozhkov (captain)	1 February 2008 (age 18)	(Croatian Football Federation) Dinamo Zagreb
8	MF	Radostin Stoilov	1 January 2008 (age 18)	(Bulgarian Football Union) Levski Sofia
13	MF	Stefan Krumov	3 January 2008 (age 18)	(Bulgarian Football Union) CSKA Sofia
10	MF	Marto Boychev	15 March 2008 (age 18)	(Bulgarian Football Union) CSKA 1948
9	MF	Samuil Tsonov	30 May 2008 (age 18)	(Bulgarian Football Union) Botev Plovdiv
11	MF	Kristian Mihaylov	28 March 2008 (age 18)	(Bulgarian Football Union) Cherno More
19	MF	Kristiyan Goryanov	10 December 2008 (age 17)	(Italian Football Federation) Cagliari
7	FW	Ricardo Fernandes	19 February 2008 (age 18)	(Portuguese Football Federation) Benfica
16	FW	Ivo Motev	24 March 2008 (age 18)	(Bulgarian Football Union) Levski Sofia
17	FW	Nikola Genchev	19 November 2008 (age 17)	(Bulgarian Football Union) Septemvri Sofia
18	FW	Georgi Angelov	1 January 2008 (age 18)	(Royal Spanish Football Federation) Espanyol
14	FW	Maksim Minkov	1 May 2008 (age 18)	(Italian Football Federation) Lecce
21	FW	Dimitar Mrankov	22 May 2008 (age 18)	(Bulgarian Football Union) Lokomotiv Plovdiv

=== Recent call ups ===
The following players have previously been called up to the Bulgaria under-19 squad and remain eligible.

Pos.	Player	Date of birth (age)	Caps	Goals	Club	Latest call-up
DF	Stoyan Pergelov	20 April 2006 (age 20)	1	0	(England) Birmingham City U21	
FW	Emil Naydenov	12 February 2007 (age 19)	2	0	(Bulgaria) Botev Plovdiv	
FW	Preslav Bachev	14 March 2006 (age 20)	7	3	(Bulgaria) Levski Sofia II	
FW	Aleksandar Kozhuharov	28 June 2006 (age 20)	0	0	(Bulgaria) CSKA Sofia III	

Notes

- ^{A} = Not part of the current squad due to being called up to the senior team.
- ^{INJ} = Not part of the current squad due to injury.
- ^{COVID} = Withdrawn from the current squad due to suffering from COVID-19.

== Recent results ==
Win Draw Loss

== Former Coach ==
- 1997-1999 (Bulgaria) Ivan Venkov Kolev

== Former squads ==
- 1985 FIFA World Youth Championship squads - Bulgaria
- 1987 FIFA World Youth Championship squads - Bulgaria
- 2008 UEFA European Under-19 Football Championship squads - Bulgaria
- 2014 UEFA European Under-19 Football Championship squads - Bulgaria
- 2017 UEFA European Under-19 Football Championship squads - Bulgaria

== See also ==
- Bulgaria national football team
- Bulgaria national under-21 football team
- Bulgaria national under-18 football team
- Bulgaria national under-17 football team
