= Lisovsky =

Lisovsky, Lisovskaya is a Russian surname. Polish counterpart: Lisowski. Notable people with the surname include:

- Aleksandr Lisovsky, Belarusian footballer
- Heraclius Lisovsky (1734–1809), Ruthenian Uniate bishop
- Igor Lisovsky (born 1954), Soviet figure skater
- Inessa Lisovskaya (born 1964), Soviet rhythmic gymnast
- Konstantin Pavlovich Lisovsky, Alexandrov Ensemble soloist
- Natalya Lisovskaya (born 1962), Soviet shot putter
- Roman Lisovsky, Belarusian footballer
- Sergey Lisovsky (born 1960), Russian politician
