= Jakub Rolinc =

Czech footballer

Personal information
- Date of birth: 12 May 1992 (age 34)
- Place of birth: Hranice, Czechoslovakia
- Height: 1.83 m (6 ft 0 in)
- Position: Forward

Team information
- Current team: Hranice
- Number: 10

Senior career*
Years	Team	Apps	(Gls)
2012–2016	Sigma Olomouc	21	(3)
2012	→ Znojmo (loan)	11	(0)
2013	→ Baník Ostrava (loan)	11	(2)
2015–2016	Sigma Olomouc B	11	(3)
2016–2017	Tatran Prešov	25	(1)
2017–2018	Radomiak Radom	53	(11)
2019–2020	Prostějov	23	(5)
2020–2021	Prostějov	9	(0)
2021–	Hranice		

International career
2008	Czech Republic U16	2	(1)
2010–2011	Czech Republic U19	2	(0)
2013	Czech Republic U21	1	(0)
- * Club domestic league appearances and goals as of 12 May 2024

Jakub Rolinc (born 12 May 1992) is a Czech professional footballer who plays as a forward for Prostějov.

== Honours ==
Radomiak Radom

- II liga: 2018–19
