= Thodoris Karapetsas =

Greek footballer

Personal information
- Full name: Theodoros Karapetsas
- Date of birth: 25 July 1990 (age 36)
- Height: 1.83 m (6 ft 0 in)
- Position: Midfielder

Youth career
- Grasshopper-Club Zurich U-21

Senior career*
Years	Team	Apps	(Gls)
2007–2008	Grasshopper U21	11	(3)
2008–2010	Grasshopper	3	(0)
2011–2012	Wohlen	17	(1)
2012–2013	Kerkyra	3	(0)
2013	Fokikos	14	(0)

International career^{‡}
2008	Greece U-19	2	(0)
- * Club domestic league appearances and goals as of 1 April 2014 ‡ National team caps and goals as of 20 July 2008

Thodoris "Theodoros" Karapetsas (Greek: Θοδωρής "Θεόδωρος" Καραπέτσας; born 25 July 1990) is a Greek footballer.

== Career ==
=== Club career ===
He started his career at Grasshopper in 2007, and eventually in 2011 he moved to Wohlen mostly playing as a midfielder. In his last season, before he returned to Greece, in the Swiss Challenge League, Karapetsas recorded 17 appearances and scored 1 goal. He played for half season in Kerkyra, before he moved for the rest of the season to Fokikos.

=== International Appearances ===
#	Date	Opponent	Result	Competition
1.	24 May 2008	Moldova U-19	1–2	Friendly match
2.	20 July 2008	England U-19	3–0	2008 UEFA European Under-19 Football Championship
