= Tomáš Wágner =

Czech footballer

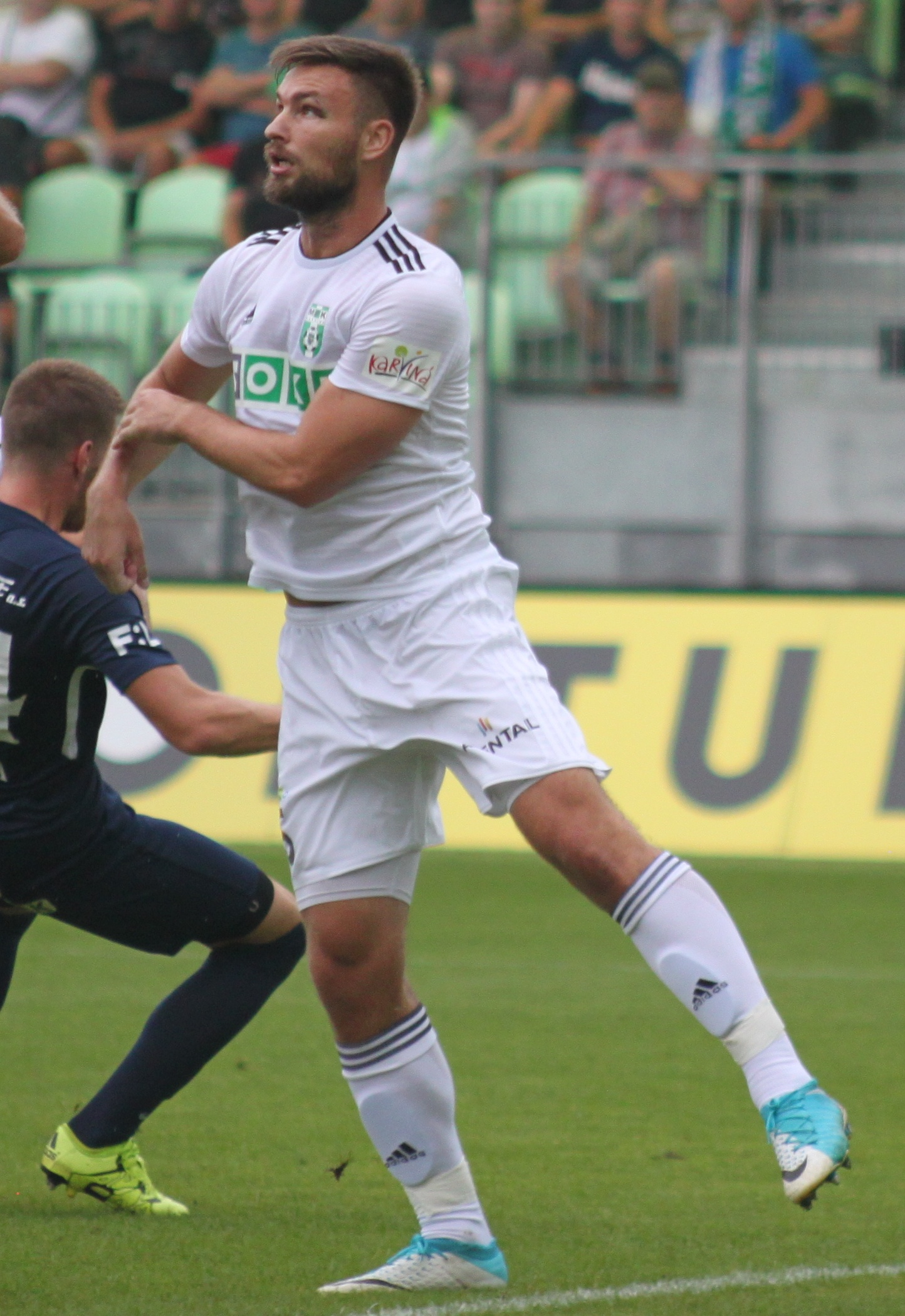
- Wágner in 2018

Personal information
- Full name: Tomáš Wágner
- Date of birth: 6 March 1990 (age 36)
- Place of birth: Prague, Czechoslovakia
- Height: 1.90 m (6 ft 3 in)
- Position: Forward

Team information
- Current team: Příbram
- Number: 15

Senior career*
Years	Team	Apps	(Gls)
2009–2012	Příbram	57	(15)
2012–2015	Viktoria Plzeň	36	(8)
2012–2013	→ Příbram (loan)	26	(6)
2014–2015	→ Mladá Boleslav (loan)	24	(10)
2015–2017	Jablonec	35	(8)
2017	→ Karviná (loan)	14	(3)
2017–2019	Karviná	29	(13)
2019–2020	Mladá Boleslav	14	(0)
2019	→ Fastav Zlín (loan)	10	(2)
2020–2021	Nea Salamis	30	(17)
2021	UTA Arad	3	(0)
2022–	Příbram	45	(21)

International career
2011–2012	Czech Republic U21	11	(6)

Managerial career
- 2024–: Příbram B (assistant)
- 2024–: Příbram (assistant)
- * Club domestic league appearances and goals as of 25 January 2024

Tomáš Wágner (born 6 March 1990) is a Czech professional footballer who plays as a forward for Příbram. He was the top-goalscorer of the Czech National Football League in the 2022–23 season with 17 goals scored.

On 9 May 2024, Wágner was appointed as an assistant of Příbram.

== Career statistics ==
As of 6 September 2023

Appearances and goals by club, season and competition
Season	Club	League			Cup		Continental		Other		Total	
Season	Club	Division	Apps	Goals	Apps	Goals	Apps	Goals	Apps	Goals	Apps	Goals
Příbram	2008–09	Czech First League	1	1	0	0	—		—		1	1
Příbram	2009–10	Czech First League	18	3	2	0	—		—		19	3
Příbram	2010–11	Czech First League	23	4	0	0	—		—		23	4
Příbram	2011–12	Czech First League	16	7	0	0	—		—		16	7
Viktoria Plzeň	2011–12	Czech First League	12	0	2	1	1 (Note: Appearances in the UEFA Cup)	0	—		15	1
Viktoria Plzeň	2013–14	Czech First League	25	8	8	0	9 (Note: Seven appearances with three goals scored in the UEFA Champions League and two appearances in the UEFA Cup)	3	1 (Note: Appearance in the Czech Supercup)	2	42	13
Příbram (loan)	2012–13	Czech First League	26	6	0	0	—		—		26	6
Mladá Boleslav (loan)	2014–15	Czech First League	24	10	7	3	0	0	—		33	13
Jablonec	2015–16	Czech First League	26	4	6	4	4	1	—		36	9
Jablonec	2016–17	Czech First League	9	4	1	0	—		—		10	4
Karviná (loan)	2016–17	Czech First League	14	1	1	1	—		—		15	2
Karviná	2017–18	Czech First League	25	9	1	0	—		—		26	9
Karviná	2018–19	Czech First League	29	13	1	0	—		2 (Note: Appearances in the relegation play-offs)	0	32	13
Mladá Boleslav	2019–20	Czech First League	14	0	1	0	2	0	—		16	0
Fastav Zlín (loan)	2019–20	Czech First League	10	2	1	0	—		—		11	2
Nea Salamis	2020–21	Cypriot First Division	30	17	1	0	—		—		31	17
UTA Arad	2021–22	Liga I	3	0	0	0	—		—		3	0
Příbram	2021–22	Czech National Football League	14	2	0	0	—		—		14	2
Příbram	2022–23	Czech National Football League	22	17	1	1	—		2 (Note: Appearances in the promotion play-offs)	0	25	18
Příbram	2023–24	Czech National Football League	5	1	0	0	—		—		5	1
Career total			346	109	35	10	16	4	3	3	400	126
