= Jiří Poděbradský =

Czech footballer (born 1982)

Personal information
- Date of birth: 9 September 1982 (age 44)
- Place of birth: Nová Paka, Czechoslovakia
- Height: 1.67 m (5 ft 6 in)
- Position: Defender

Team information
- Current team: FC Hradec Králové
- Number: 16

Senior career*
Years	Team	Apps	(Gls)
2004–	Hradec Králové	98	(4)
2007	→ Týniště nad Orlicí (loan)		
2008	→ Sokolov (loan)	13	(0)
- * Club domestic league appearances and goals as of 31 December 2011

Jiří Poděbradský (born 9 September 1982) is a Czech football defender. He currently plays for Hradec Králové in the Gambrinus liga.
