= Stanislav Tecl =

Czech footballer (born 1990)

Personal information
- Date of birth: 1 September 1990 (age 36)
- Place of birth: Jindřichův Hradec, Czechoslovakia
- Height: 1.81 m (5 ft 11 in)
- Position: Forward

Youth career
- 2002–2008: Jihlava

Senior career*
Years	Team	Apps	(Gls)
2008–2012	Jihlava	88	(38)
2010	→ Slavia Prague (loan)	4	(0)
2013–2015	Viktoria Plzeň	61	(17)
2015–2017	Jablonec	34	(11)
2017–2024	Slavia Prague	129	(32)
2017–2018	→ Jablonec (loan)	13	(8)

International career
2007	Czech Republic U-18	3	(0)
2009	Czech Republic U-19	2	(0)
2012	Czech Republic U-21	5	(2)
2013–2024	Czech Republic	10	(0)
- * Club domestic league appearances and goals

Stanislav Tecl (born 1 September 1990) is a Czech former professional footballer who played as a forward. He played in the Czech First League for Slavia Prague, Jihlava, Viktoria Plzeň and Jablonec, winning two championships with Viktoria Plzeň and a further four with Slavia Prague. Tecl played internationally for the Czech Republic, making ten appearances for his nation between 2013 and 2022.

== Club career ==
=== Vysočina Jihlava ===
==== Early career and loan to Slavia ====
Tecl scored 6 times in 22 matches for Jihlava at the beginning of his career. Describing himself as "a Slavia fan since childhood", Tecl then joined Slavia Prague on a six-month loan in January 2010. He played four league games for the club without scoring during his loan. In April 2011, Tecl scored a hat trick against Sparta Prague B and set up one of the other goals in a 5–1 win for Jihlava.

At the start of the 2011–12 season, Tecl scored twice in the Czech Cup 5–0 first round win away against Vrchovina, adding a further goal in a 3–0 second round win at Spartak Hulín. In that season's league he scored the only goal of Jihlava's second round match against Sezimovo Ústí in August 2011. Jihlava celebrated promotion from the Second League at the end of the season, with Tecl scoring his 12th league goal, in a 3–0 victory against Třinec, which secured their return to the top flight for the first time in six years.

==== 2012–13 season: First League ====
Tecl served as captain of Jihlava in the 2012–13 season, as they returned to the top flight. Tecl scored in the opening game of the 2012–13 Czech First League away against Slavia, converting a penalty after being fouled by goalkeeper Kamil Čontofalský to put his side 3–0 up, in a match which finished 3–3. In August 2012, he scored his club's only goal in a 1–1 away draw against Hradec Králové, as well as 12 days later in a 1–1 home draw against Sigma Olomouc. In Jihlava's sixth match, away against Mladá Boleslav, the club recorded their first league win after five draws. Tecl scored the opening goal after a counter-attack and scored a second goal from a penalty, taking his total for the season to five. He provided the assist for Jihlava's third goal as Václav Koloušek completed the scoring, with the result 3–1 to Jihlava.

Tecl became the Czech First League's leading scorer that season when he scored his sixth goal of the season in his seventh match. He scored Jihlava's first goal of the game as they came from behind to win 3–2 at home against Baník Ostrava in mid-September. Tecl added goals later in September, scoring in Jihlava's 5–1 away loss to Zbrojovka Brno, then converting a penalty in a 2–1 home win for Jihlava against Příbram. In October 2012 Tecl continued his goalscoring form, finding the net in a 3–1 loss at Teplice, before scoring his 10th goal of the season in a 1–1 draw at home against Sparta Prague. During the match, he tore ankle ligaments after a duel with Sparta defender Jiří Jarošík, an injury expected to prevent him playing for the rest of the autumn. He finished the first half of the season having scored 10 goals in 11 games.

=== Viktoria Plzeň ===
==== Arrival and 2012–13 season ====
Tecl joined Viktoria Plzeň in January 2013 for a transfer fee reported to be 20 million Czech koruna. He scored for the club in his first friendly game after just 21 minutes, as Plzeň comfortably beat Czech Fourth Division side Doubravka by a 7–1 scoreline. Tecl made his first competitive appearance for Plzeň in the 2012–13 UEFA Europa League against SSC Napoli, scoring in the 90th minute, having entered the game as a substitute. In the reverse fixture one week later, Tecl again entered the game as a substitute. He scored in the 73rd minute after a counter-attacking move by Plzeň in a 2–0 win for his club, securing progress to the next round with a 5–0 aggregate scoreline. He finished the season with Plzeň winning the Czech First League championship.

==== 2013–14 season ====
In the opening game of the 2013–14 Czech First League, Tecl scored a penalty in a 5–0 victory against Bohemians 1905. It was his first league goal for Plzeň since arriving at the beginning of the year. In August 2013, Tecl scored his second league goal for Plzeň, and first from open play, finishing a break after a pass from Michal Ďuriš in a 3–1 away win against Slovácko. Later in August, Tecl scored the only goal in the 2013–14 UEFA Champions League play-off round second leg against NK Maribor of Slovenia, which resulted in his club qualifying for the group stage of the competition. In the subsequent group stage, he scored in a 4–2 loss to Manchester City.

On 1 November 2013, Tecl scored two goals, including a penalty, in a 6–1 league victory against Jablonec, who played from the 22nd minute with ten players. Later the same month, Tecl scored two more goals, this time in a 3–1 away win against Brno. In February 2014, he scored both of his team's goals in a 2–1 away win against Baník Ostrava. Tecl played for Plzeň in the final of the Czech Cup in May 2014. They finished runners-up as Sparta prevailed on a penalty shoot-out, after the game finished 1–1.

==== 2014–15 season ====
Tecl scored his first hat trick in the Czech First League in a 3–0 October 2014 away win at Mladá Boleslav, having only scored one goal that season before that point. He scored again in the 2–1 league victory against Jablonec in the last match before the league's winter break, with the result confirming Plzeň would spend the break in first place. The season concluded with Plzeň winning their second title in three years.

=== Jablonec ===
Tecl was one of two forwards signed by Jablonec in June 2015, committing to a contract with the club to the end of the 2017–18 season. Tecl played in the 2015–16 UEFA Europa League qualifying phase, receiving a red card against Danish opponents Copenhagen in the first leg of the third qualifying round for a foul on Ludwig Augustinsson. On 25 September 2015, he scored his first competitive goal for Jablonec in a 2–1 home loss in the league against Mladá Boleslav. In February 2016, Tecl scored two goals and assisted another in a 3–0 home victory against Brno.

In November 2016, Tecl scored two goals for Jablonec in a 3–0 win against rivals Slovan Liberec, scoring from a header in the first minute of the match before beating the goalkeeper with a nutmeg in the second half.

=== Slavia Prague ===
Tecl joined Slavia Prague in January 2017 for a transfer fee of around 15 million Czech koruna. On 27 May 2017, he scored two goals in a 4–0 victory against Zbrojovka Brno in the final matchday of the 2016–17 Czech First League that clinched the title for his team. He finished the 2016–17 season with two league goals in 11 appearances for Slavia.

Tecl started the 2017–18 season by moving on loan to former club Jablonec. He scored two goals as Slavia Prague won the 2017–18 Czech Cup final 3–1 against Jablonec on 9 May 2018. In April 2021, Tecl scored his first Prague derby goal, in a 2–0 win against Slavia's rivals Sparta. It was just his second goal against Sparta in 17 league matches. Tecl won the Czech First League Player of the Month award for August 2022, having scored six goals in four league matches, including a hat trick against Pardubice, two goals against Teplice, and a further goal against Brno. Tecl played his final game of his professional career on 27 May 2024, coming on as a substitute in the 82nd minute for Slavia in a 4–0 win against Mladá Boleslav. He left the club having celebrated four domestic titles with them.

== International career ==
Tecl scored his first international goals at under-21 level in September 2012. Playing against Wales U21, he scored twice as a second-half substitute in qualifying for the 2013 European U21 championship.

Having represented the Czech Republic at youth level, Tecl debuted for the senior squad in a 2–0 friendly victory against Turkey in February 2013. Tecl was called up to the national team in September 2020 as part of a reserve squad, which had to be assembled at late notice due to a case of COVID-19 among the first-choice squad. Alongside Roman Hubník, Tecl was one of just two players from the 23 nominated who had previously played for his country. In the match against Scotland, Tecl assisted Jakub Pešek, who opened the scoring, but the Czech Republic went on to lose 2–1.

== Personal life ==
On 25 December 2016, Tecl welcomed his first son, Matěj.

== Career statistics ==
=== Club ===
As of 30 June 2023

Club	Season	League			Cup		Continental		Other		Total	
Club	Season	Division	Apps	Goals	Apps	Goals	Apps	Goals	Apps	Goals	Apps	Goals
Jihlava	2008–09	Czech National Football League	6	1	0	0	—		—		6	1
Jihlava	2009–10	Czech National Football League	16	5	0	0	—		—		16	5
Jihlava	2010–11	Czech National Football League	27	10	0	0	—		—		27	10
Jihlava	2011–12	Czech National Football League	28	12	0	0	—		—		28	12
Jihlava	2012–13	Czech First League	11	10	0	0	—		—		11	10
Jihlava	Total		88	38	0	0	—		—		88	38
Slavia Prague (loan)	2009–10	Czech First League	4	0	0	0	—		—		4	0
Viktoria Plzeň	2012–13	Czech First League	14	0	2	0	4	2	—		20	2
Viktoria Plzeň	2013–14	Czech First League	29	12	7	3	15	5	0	0	51	20
Viktoria Plzeň	2014–15	Czech First League	18	5	4	0	1	0	1	0	24	5
Viktoria Plzeň	Total		61	17	13	3	20	7	1	0	95	27
Jablonec	2015–16	Czech First League	26	7	7	0	2	0	—		35	7
Jablonec	2016–17	Czech First League	8	4	1	0	—		—		9	4
Jablonec	Total		34	11	8	0	2	0	—		44	11
Slavia Prague	2016–17	Czech First League	11	2	2	1	—		—		13	3
Slavia Prague	2017–18	Czech First League	11	3	2	2	—		—		13	5
Slavia Prague	2018–19	Czech First League	10	3	0	0	4	0	—		14	3
Slavia Prague	2019–20	Czech First League	23	3	2	0	3	0	0	0	28	3
Slavia Prague	2020–21	Czech First League	22	4	3	4	6	0	—		31	8
Slavia Prague	2021–22	Czech First League	20	6	2	0	11	0	—		33	6
Slavia Prague	2022–23	Czech First League	30	11	4	1	8	0	—		42	12
Slavia Prague	Total		127	32	15	8	32	0	0	0	174	40
Jablonec (loan)	2017–18	Czech First League	13	8	2	3	—		—		15	11
Career total			327	106	38	14	54	7	1	0	420	127

=== International ===
Appearances and goals by national team and year
National team	Year	Apps	Goals
Czech Republic	2013	1	0
Czech Republic	2014	1	0
Czech Republic	2018	3	0
Czech Republic	2020	1	0
Czech Republic	2021	3	0
Czech Republic	2022	1	0
Total		10	0

== Honours ==
=== Club ===
Viktoria Plzeň

- Czech First League: 2012–13, 2014–15

Slavia Prague

- Czech First League: 2016–17
