= Luboš Tusjak =

Czech footballer

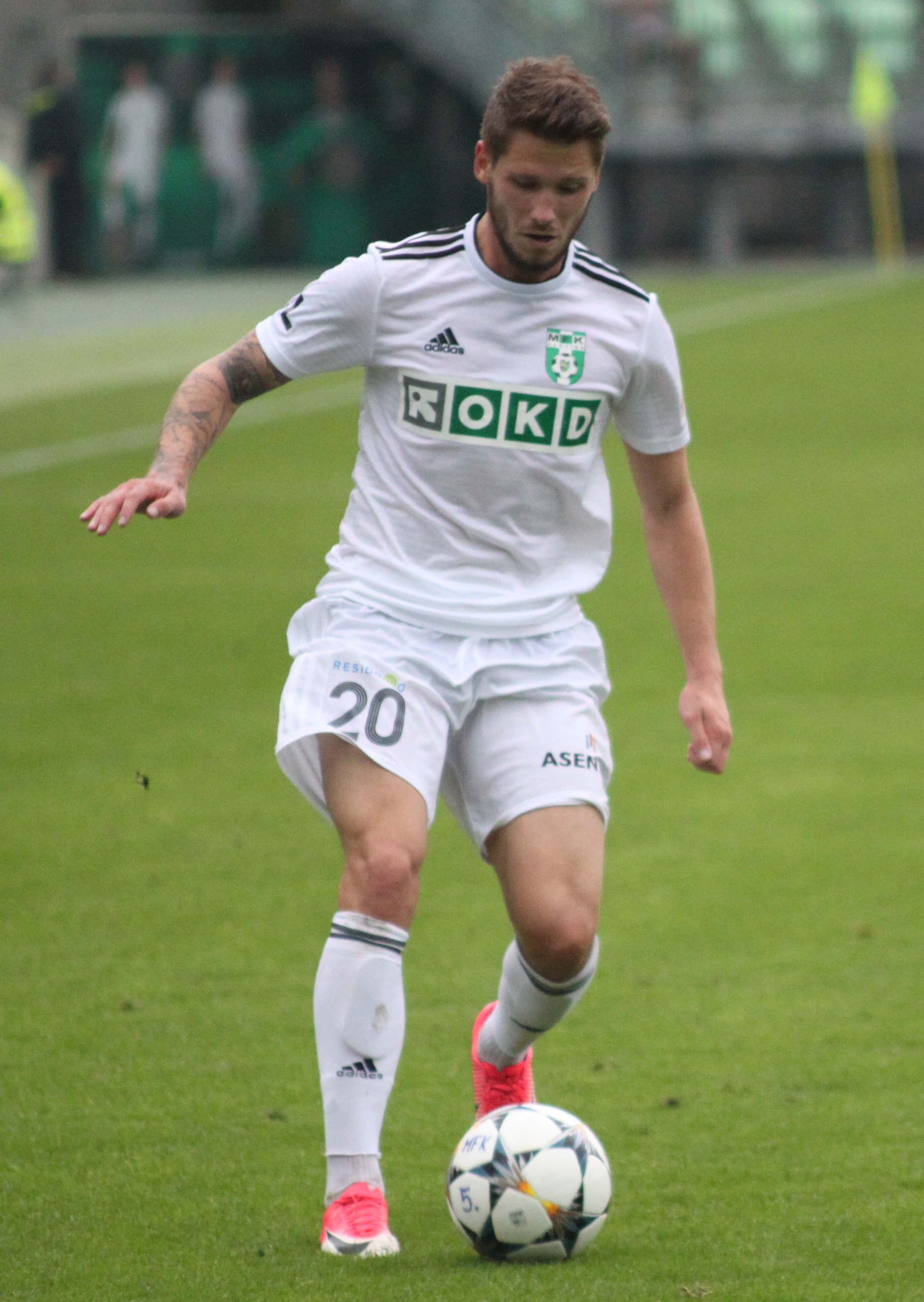

Personal information
- Date of birth: 15 February 1992 (age 34)
- Place of birth: Czechoslovakia
- Height: 1.75 m (5 ft 9 in)
- Position: Left back

Team information
- Current team: Silon Táborsko
- Number: 6

Senior career*
Years	Team	Apps	(Gls)
2011–2015	Slavia Prague	12	(0)
2012	→ Viktoria Žižkov (loan)	6	(1)
2013	→ Táborsko (loan)	14	(0)
2014–2015	→ Táborsko (loan)	26	(2)
2016	Slavoj Vyšehrad	12	(0)
2016–2018	Vlašim	50	(2)
2018–2019	Karviná	10	(0)
2019	→ Viktoria Žižkov (loan)	13	(0)
2019–2021	Viktoria Žižkov	46	(0)
2021	→ Silon Táborsko (loan)	9	(0)
2021–	Silon Táborsko	83	(1)

International career
2007–2008	Czech Republic U16	4	(0)
2008	Czech Republic U17	1	(0)
2012	Czech Republic U20	1	(0)
2012	Czech Republic U21	1	(0)
- * Club domestic league appearances and goals as of 4 January 2025

Luboš Tusjak (born 15 February 1992) is a Czech football player who currently plays for Silon Táborsko. He has represented the Czech Republic at under-17 level. He made his Czech First League debut for Slavia against Teplice on 22 August 2011.
