= Marián Čišovský =

Slovak footballer (1979–2020)

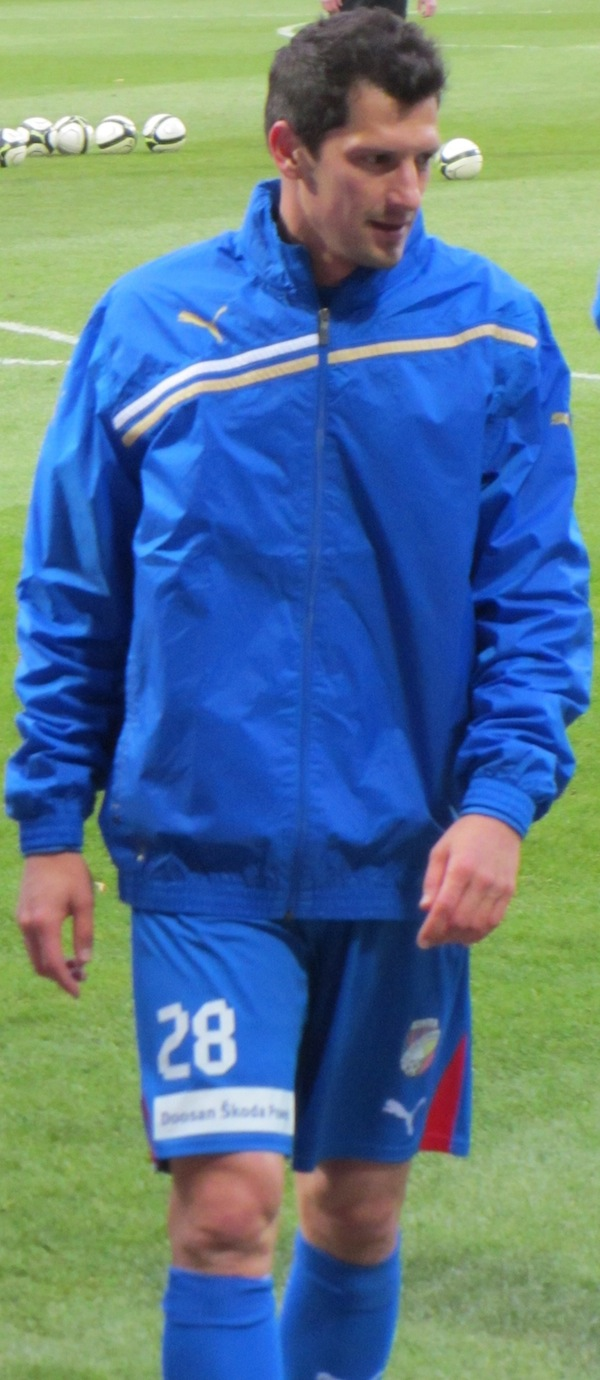
- Čišovský with Viktoria Plzeň in 2013

Personal information
- Date of birth: 2 November 1979
- Place of birth: Humenné, Czechoslovakia
- Date of death: 28 June 2020 (aged 40)
- Height: 1.85 m (6 ft 1 in)
- Position: Centre-back

Youth career
- Humenné

Senior career*
Years	Team	Apps	(Gls)
1996–1999	Humenné	52	(1)
1999–2004	Inter Bratislava	115	(5)
2004–2005	Žilina	54	(12)
2006–2008	Artmedia Petržalka	63	(13)
2008–2011	Politehnica Timişoara	59	(5)
2011–2014	Viktoria Plzeň	64	(12)
Total		407	(48)

International career
1997	Slovakia U18	3	(0)
1999–2001	Slovakia U21	17	(1)
2000	Slovakia B	3	(0)
2000	Slovakia Olympic	2	(0)
2002–2013	Slovakia	15	(0)
Medal record
Inter Bratislava
Runner-up	Slovak Superliga	1999
Winner	Slovak Superliga	2000
Winner	Slovak Superliga	2001
Third place	Slovak Superliga	2002
MŠK Žilina
Runner-up	Slovak Superliga	2005
Artmedia Bratislava
Runner-up	Slovak Superliga	2006
Runner-up	Slovak Superliga	2007
Winner	Slovak Superliga	2008
Politehnica Timişoara
Runner-up	Liga I	2009
Runner-up	Romanian Cup	2009
Runner-up	Liga I	2011
- * Club domestic league appearances and goals

Marián Čišovský (2 November 1979 – 28 June 2020) was a Slovak professional footballer who played as a centre-back.

== Club career ==
Čišovský played for his home team Chemlon Humenné until 1999, when he transferred to Inter Bratislava. While playing for Inter, he became champion of the Slovak league twice and also won the Slovak Cup twice. In 2004, he signed with MŠK Žilina. From 2006 to 2008 he played for Artmedia Bratislava, before leaving for Romania's Politehnica Timișoara.

He suffered a seven-month long injury and came back on 11 April 2010 and played 90 minutes against FC Ceahlăul. On 5 August 2010 he scored the qualification goal in 93rd minute against MyPa in Europa League making it 3–3. Čišovský scored one goal in 2–0 win against Oţelul Galaţi.

In 2011, he joined Czech club Viktoria Plzeň. He missed the entirety of their 2014–15 league conquest due to amyotrophic lateral sclerosis (ALS). Manager Miroslav Koubek said he would trade the title to cure Čišovský, who attended their title celebrations as the crowd sang his name.

In 2016 a charity event was held in Prague in support of Čišovský.

== Death ==
Čišovský died on 28 June 2020 due to complications from ALS.

== Honours ==
Inter Bratislava

- Slovak Super Liga: 1999–2000, 2000–01
- Slovak Cup: 1999–2000, 2000–01

Artmedia Petržalka

- Slovak Super Liga: 2007–08
- Slovak Cup: 2007–08

Viktoria Plzeň

- Czech First League: 2012–13
- Czech Supercup: 2011
