= David Štípek =

Czech soccer player

Personal information
- Date of birth: 31 May 1992 (age 34)
- Place of birth: Nýřany, Czechoslovakia
- Height: 1.71 m (5 ft 7 in)
- Position: Midfielder

Team information
- Current team: TJ Přeštice

Youth career
- 1997–2000: TJ DIOSS Nýřany
- 2000–2011: Viktoria Plzeň

Senior career*
Years	Team	Apps	(Gls)
2011–2017	Viktoria Plzeň	13	(2)
2013–2014	→ Mladá Boleslav (loan)	11	(0)
2014–2015	→ Hradec Králové (loan)	25	(1)
2015–2016	→ Příbram (loan)	14	(0)
2016–2017	→ Fastav Zlín (loan)	19	(1)
2017–2018	Fastav Zlín	0	(0)
2018	→ Viktoria Žižkov (loan)	12	(2)
2018–2020	Baník Sokolov	43	(1)
2020–2021	SV Poppenreuth		
2021–	TJ Přeštice		

International career
2006–2008	Czech Republic U16	7	(0)
2008–2010	Czech Republic U18	7	(0)
2010–2012	Czech Republic U19	6	(0)
2012–2013	Czech Republic U21	1	(0)
- * Club domestic league appearances and goals as of 20:53, 28 May 2020 (UTC)

David Štípek (born 31 May 1992) is a Czech professional footballer who plays for TJ Přeštice as a midfielder.

== Career ==
After a spell at German club SV Poppenreuth, Štípek returned to the Czech Republic in February 2021, signing with TJ Přeštice.

== Career statistics ==
As of 20 February 2013

Season	Club	League		Cup		Continental		Total	
Season	Club	Apps	Goals	Apps	Goals	Apps	Goals	Apps	Goals
2012–13 Gambrinus liga	Viktoria Plzeň	8	1	0	0	7	2	15	3
Career Total		8	1	0	0	7	2	15	3
