= Matěj Končal =

Czech footballer

Personal information
- Date of birth: 8 December 1993 (age 32)
- Place of birth: Plzeň, Czech Republic
- Height: 1.80 m (5 ft 11 in)
- Positions: Right midfielder; left midfielder

Team information
- Current team: TJ Přeštice

Youth career
- 2002–2012: Viktoria Plzeň

Senior career*
Years	Team	Apps	(Gls)
2012–2016	Viktoria Plzeň	6	(2)
2013–2014	→ Varnsdorf (loan)	10	(1)
2015	→ Mladá Boleslav (loan)	7	(0)
2015–2016	→ Příbram (loan)	9	(0)
2016–2017	Jablonec	6	(0)
2017	→ Varnsdorf (loan)	4	(0)
2017–2018	Baník Sokolov	27	(3)
2018–2019	Vítkovice	8	(1)
2019–2020	Komárno	9	(1)
2020–2021	SV Poppenreuth		
2021–	TJ Přeštice		

International career
2012	Czech Republic U-19	3	(0)
2013	Czech Republic U-20	2	(0)
2013–2014	Czech Republic U-21	3	(0)
- * Club domestic league appearances and goals as of 00:22, 27 November 2019 (UTC)

Matěj Končal (born 8 December 1993) is a professional Czech football player who currently plays for TJ Přeštice. He has represented the Czech Republic at youth level.

== Career ==
After a spell at German club SV Poppenreuth, Štípek returned to the Czech Republic in February 2021, signing with TJ Přeštice.
