= Jan Kovařík =

Czech footballer

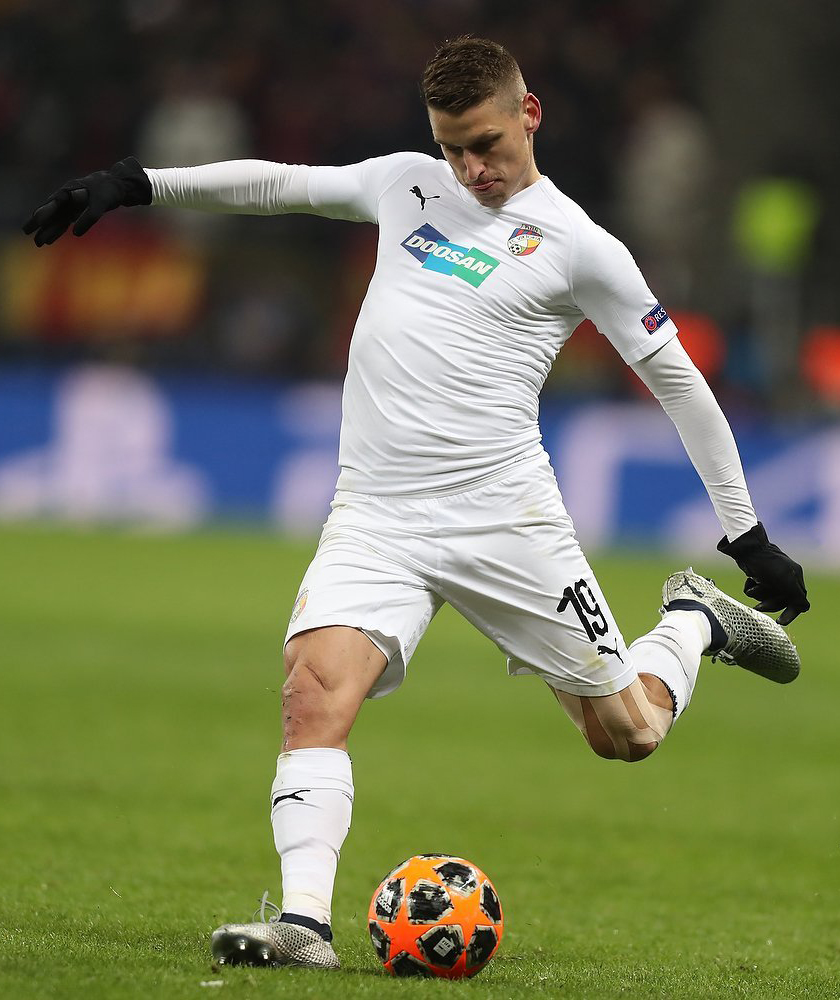
- Kovařík playing for Viktoria Plzeň in 2018

Personal information
- Date of birth: 19 June 1988 (age 38)
- Place of birth: Most, Czechoslovakia
- Height: 1.85 m (6 ft 1 in)
- Position: Winger

Team information
- Current team: Bohemians 1905
- Number: 19

Youth career
- 1993–1998: Litvínov
- 1998–1999: Teplice
- 1999–2000: Osek
- 2000–2003: Fotbalová škola Most
- 2003–2008: Slavia Prague

Senior career*
Years	Team	Apps	(Gls)
2008	České Budějovice	5	(0)
2009	Slavia Prague	1	(0)
2009–2013	Jablonec	94	(11)
2013–2021	Viktoria Plzeň	193	(23)
2021–	Bohemians 1905	135	(9)

International career
2005	Czech Republic U18	2	(0)
2009–2011	Czech Republic U21	13	(2)
- * Club domestic league appearances and goals as of 27 May 2026

Jan Kovařík (born 19 June 1988) is a Czech football player who plays for Bohemians 1905. He played for the Czech under-21 team, representing the team at the 2011 UEFA European Under-21 Football Championship.

== International career ==
Kovařík was called up to the senior Czech Republic side in May 2015 for a friendly against Iceland.

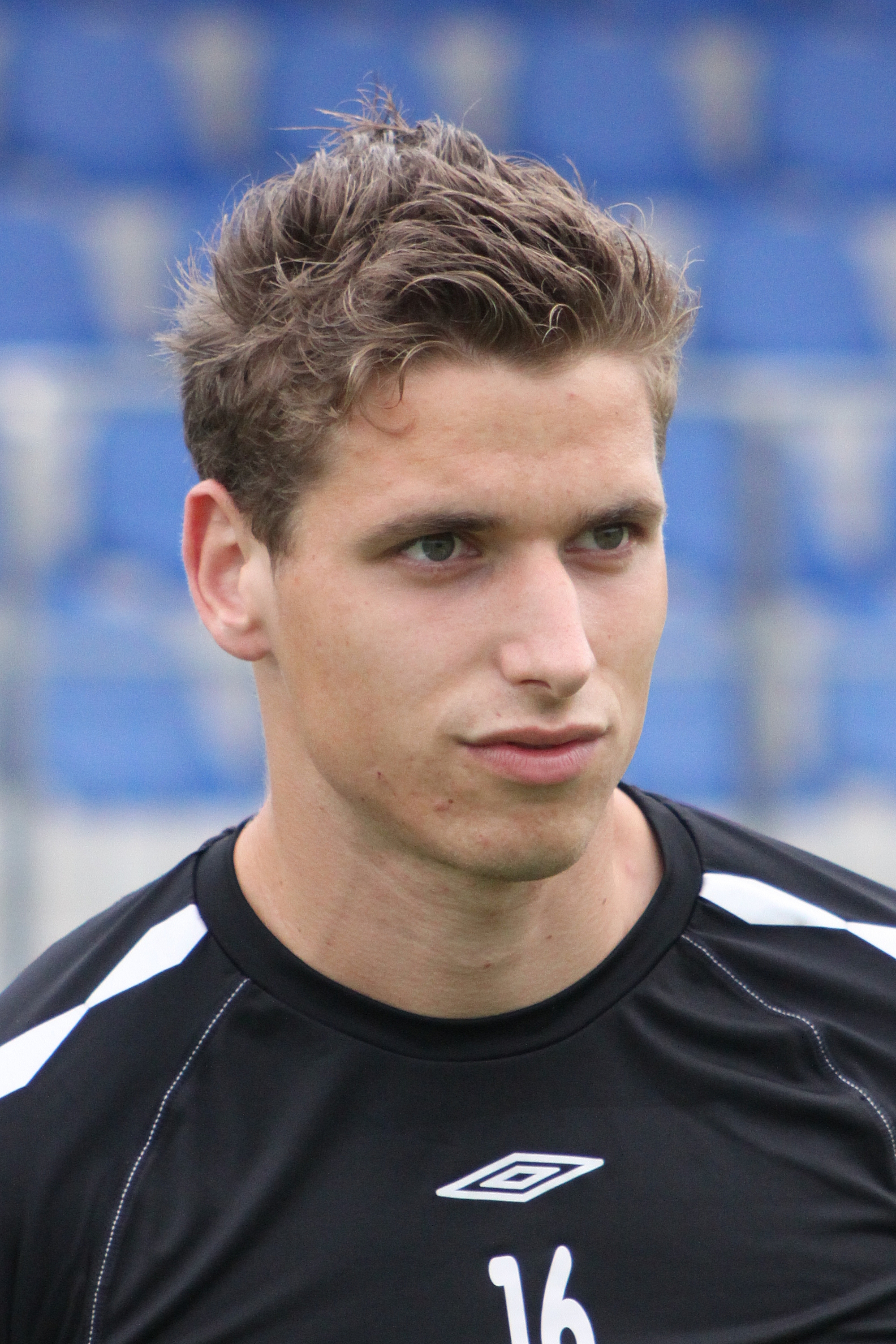
Kovařík in 2009

== Career statistics ==
As of 30 December 2014

Season	Club	League		Cup		Continental		Total	
Season	Club	Apps	Goals	Apps	Goals	Apps	Goals	Apps	Goals
2008–09 Czech First League	SK České Budějovice	5	0	0	0	0	0	5	0
2008–09 Czech First League	SK Slavia Prague	1	0	0	0	0	0	1	0
2009–10 Czech First League	FK Jablonec	28	2	0	0	0	0	28	2
2010–11 Czech First League	FK Jablonec	29	3	0	0	2	0	31	3
2011–12 Czech First League	FK Jablonec	23	5	0	0	4	2	27	7
2012–13 Czech First League	FK Jablonec	14	1	0	0	0	0	14	1
2012–13 Czech First League	Viktoria Plzeň	14	1	0	0	4	1	18	2
2013–14 Czech First League	Viktoria Plzeň	24	3	0	0	13	0	37	3
2014–15 Czech First League	Viktoria Plzeň	13	0	0	0	1	0	14	0
Career Total		151	15	0	0	24	3	175	18

== Honours ==
=== Club ===
FC Viktoria Plzeň

- Czech First League: 2012–13
