= Václav Procházka =

Czech footballer (born 1984)

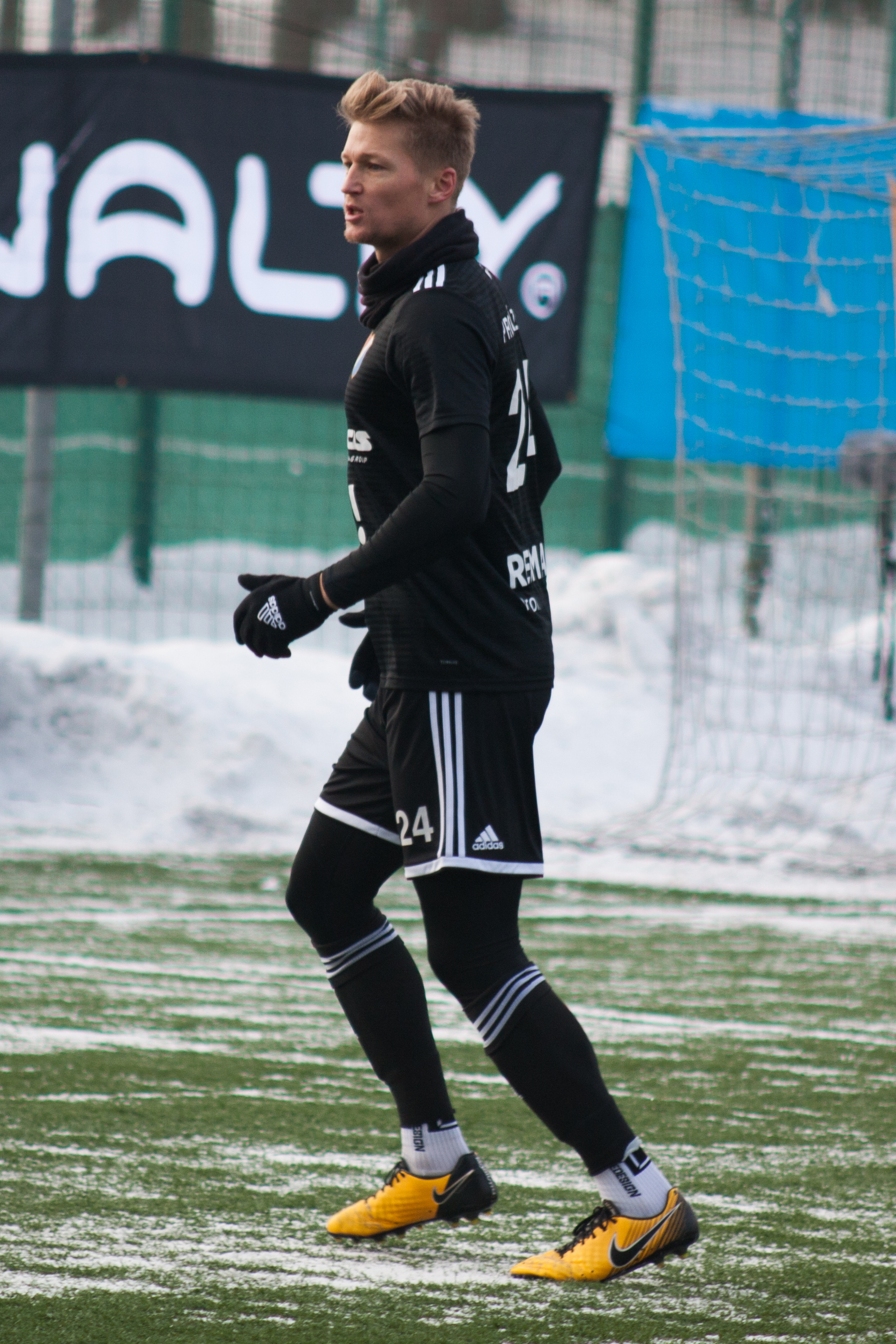

Personal information
- Date of birth: 8 May 1984 (age 42)
- Place of birth: Rokycany, Czechoslovakia
- Height: 1.83 m (6 ft 0 in)
- Position: Centre back

Team information
- Current team: Jiskra Domažlice

Youth career
- 1990–1995: ZKZ Břasy
- 1995–2002: Viktoria Plzeň

Senior career*
Years	Team	Apps	(Gls)
2002–2007	Viktoria Plzeň	96	(3)
2005	→ Slovácko (loan)	8	(0)
2008–2012	Mladá Boleslav	104	(9)
2012–2016	Viktoria Plzeň	105	(8)
2016–2018	Osmanlıspor	38	(0)
2018–2020	Baník Ostrava	60	(3)
2020–2023	Trinity Zlín	87	(4)
2023–	Jiskra Domažlice	0	(0)

International career^{‡}
2004–2006	Czech Republic U-21	3	(0)
2013–2015	Czech Republic	6	(0)
- * Club domestic league appearances and goals as of 25 May 2023 ‡ National team caps and goals as of 18 November 2015

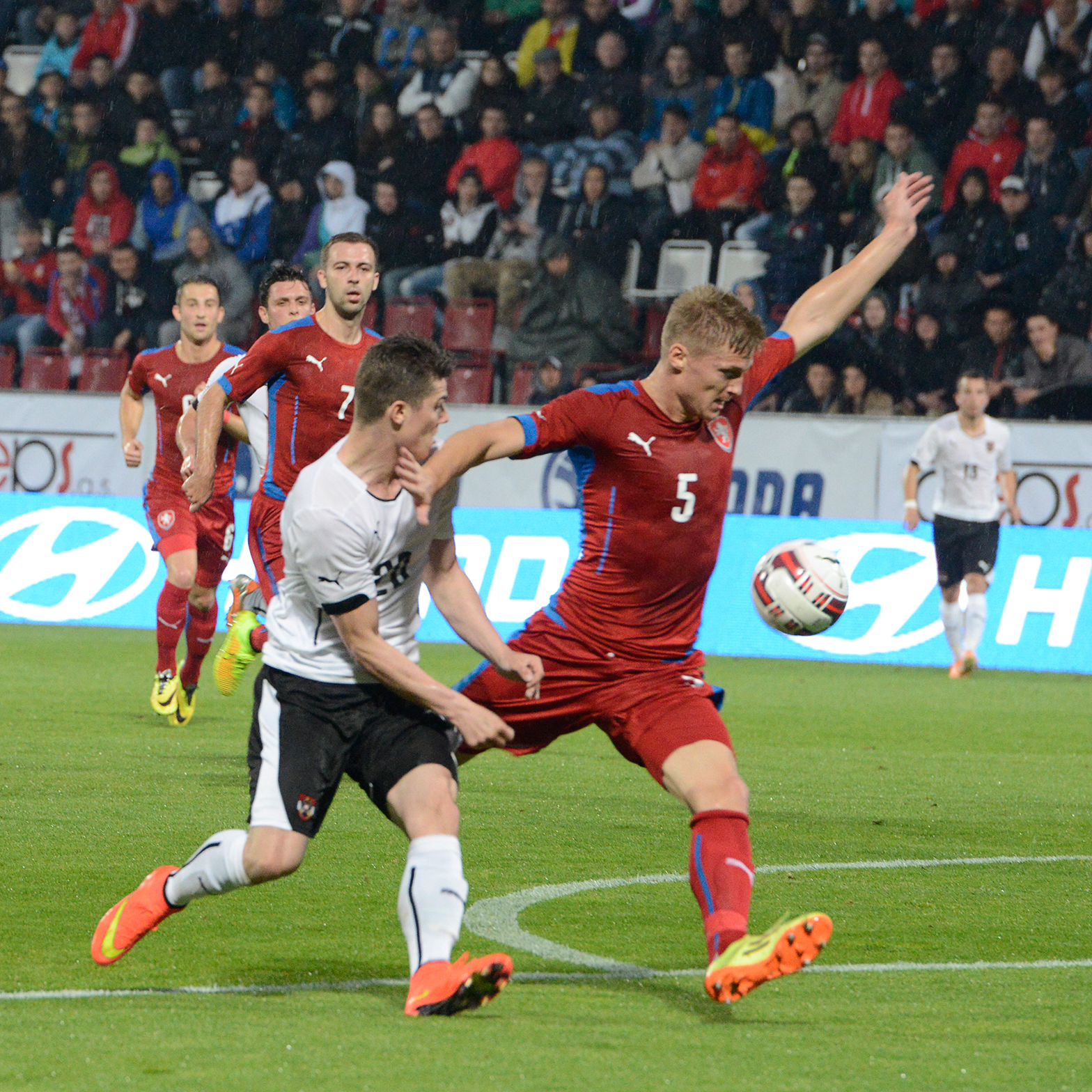
Václav Procházka

Václav Procházka (Czech pronunciation: [ˈvaːtslaf ˈproxaːska], born 8 May 1984) is a Czech professional footballer who plays for Jiskra Domažlice in the Bohemian Football League.

At international level, Procházka played extensively for the Czech Republic youth national teams since the under-15 level. In May 2013 he was called up to the national team.

== Career statistics ==
As of 30 June 2015

Season	Club	League		Cup		Continental		Total	
Season	Club	Apps	Goals	Apps	Goals	Apps	Goals	Apps	Goals
2003–04 Czech First League	Viktoria Plzeň	23	1	0	0	0	0	23	1
2004–05 Czech First League	1. FC Slovácko	8	0	0	0	0	0	8	0
2005–06 Czech First League	Viktoria Plzeň	28	1	0	0	0	0	28	1
2006–07 Czech First League	Viktoria Plzeň	29	0	0	0	0	0	29	0
2007–08 Czech First League	Viktoria Plzeň	3	1	0	0	0	0	3	1
2007–08 Czech First League	FK Mladá Boleslav	13	0	0	0	4	0	17	0
2008–09 Czech First League	FK Mladá Boleslav	29	3	0	0	0	0	29	3
2009–10 Czech First League	FK Mladá Boleslav	26	1	0	0	0	0	26	1
2010–11 Czech First League	FK Mladá Boleslav	21	3	0	0	0	0	21	3
2011–12 Czech First League	FK Mladá Boleslav	15	2	0	0	0	0	15	2
2011–12 Czech First League	Viktoria Plzeň	6	0	0	0	2	0	8	0
2012–13 Czech First League	Viktoria Plzeň	27	5	0	0	15	1	42	6
2013–14 Czech First League	Viktoria Plzeň	28	2	0	0	15	0	43	2
2014–15 Czech First League	Viktoria Plzeň	30	1	0	0	2	0	32	1
Career Total		285	20	0	0	38	1	323	21

== Honours ==
=== Club ===
FC Viktoria Plzeň

- Czech First League: 2012–13
