= Michal Bárta =

Czech footballer

Personal information
- Date of birth: 23 December 1989 (age 36)
- Place of birth: Chlumec nad Cidlinou, Czechoslovakia
- Height: 1.96 m (6 ft 5 in)
- Position: Goalkeeper

Youth career
- Rožnov pod Radhoštěm
- Sigma Olomouc

Senior career*
Years	Team	Apps	(Gls)
2008–2015	Sigma Olomouc	1	(0)
2010–2011	→ Čáslav (loan)	21	(0)
2012	→ Líšeň (loan)		
2012–2013	→ Baník Ostrava (loan)	25	(0)
2014	→ České Budějovice (loan)		
2015–2018	Jablonec	10	(0)
2018	→ Bohemians 1905 (loan)	0	(0)
2018–2019	Fotbal Třinec	2	(0)
2019–2021	Frýdek-Místek	19	(0)
2020	→ Slavoj Trebišov (loan)	1	(0)
2021–2023	Prostějov	20	(0)
- * Club domestic league appearances and goals as of 20 June 2023

Michal Bárta (born 23 December 1989) is a Czech football player who played for 1. SK Prostějov.
