= Paweł Lisowski =

Polish footballer

Personal information
- Full name: Paweł Lisowski
- Date of birth: 8 October 1991 (age 35)
- Place of birth: Szczecin, Poland
- Height: 1.78 m (5 ft 10 in)
- Position: Midfielder

Team information
- Current team: Rurzyca Nawodna
- Number: 4

Youth career
- Stal Szczecin
- 2008: Salos Szczecin

Senior career*
Years	Team	Apps	(Gls)
2008–2013	Ruch Chorzów (ME)	53	(6)
2010–2013	Ruch Chorzów	49	(0)
2013–2014	Piast Gliwice	0	(0)
2013	→ GKS Tychy (loan)	6	(0)
2014–2015	Flota Świnoujście	24	(2)
2015	Kotwica Kołobrzeg	3	(0)
2015	Bytovia Bytów	7	(0)
2016–2017	Błękitni Stargard	36	(3)
2017–2018	Stilon Gorzów Wielkopolski	24	(0)
2019–2020	Penkuner SV Rot-Weiß	6	(3)
2020–2021	Stal Szczecin	18	(3)
2021	Vineta Wolin	16	(1)
2023–	Rurzyca Nawodna	37	(7)

International career
2011	Poland U20	2	(0)
2012	Poland U21	1	(0)
- * Club domestic league appearances and goals as of 18:49, 24 June 2025 (UTC)

Paweł Lisowski (born 8 October 1991) is a Polish footballer who plays as a midfielder for regional league club Rurzyca Nawodna.

== Career ==
Lisowski made his Ekstraklasa debut on 27 March 2010 in a 4–1 away win over Cracovia.
