= 2012–13 UEFA Europa League qualifying =

Football tournament qualification stage

The 2012–13 UEFA Europa League qualifying phase decided the 62 teams that would participate in the final play-off round of qualifying.

All times are CEST (UTC+2).

== Round and draw dates ==
All draws were held at UEFA headquarters in Nyon, Switzerland.

Round	Draw date and time	First leg	Second leg
First qualifying round	25 June 2012, 13:30	5 July 2012	12 July 2012
Second qualifying round	25 June 2012, 13:30	19 July 2012	26 July 2012
Third qualifying round	20 July 2012, 13:30	2 August 2012	9 August 2012
Play-off round	10 August 2012, 13:30	23 August 2012	30 August 2012

Matches may also be played on Tuesdays or Wednesdays instead of the regular Thursdays due to scheduling conflicts.

== Format ==
Each tie was played over two legs, with each team playing one leg at home. The team that scored more goals on aggregate over the two legs advanced to the next round. In the event that aggregate score finished level, the away goals rule would be applied, i.e., the team that scored more goals away from home over the two legs advanced. If away goals were also equal, then thirty minutes of extra time would be played, divided into two fifteen-minutes halves. The away goals rule would again be applied after extra time, i.e., if there were goals scored during extra time and the aggregate score was still level, the visiting team would advance by virtue of more away goals scored. If no goals were scored during extra time, the tie would be decided by penalty shootout.

In the draws for each round, teams were seeded based on their 2012 UEFA club coefficients, with the teams divided into seeded and unseeded pots. A seeded team was drawn against an unseeded team, with the order of legs in each tie decided randomly. Due to the limited time between matches, the draws for the second and third qualifying rounds took place before the results of the previous round were known. The seeding in these draws (or in any cases where the results of a tie in the previous round were not known at the time of draw) was carried out under the assumption that the higher-ranked teams of the previous round would advance to this round, which means if a lower-ranked team were to advance, it would simply take the seeding of its defeated opponent. Prior to the draws, UEFA may form "groups" in accordance with the principles set by the Club Competitions Committee, but they were purely for convenience of the draw and for ensuring that teams from the same association were not drawn against each other, and did not resemble any real groupings in the sense of the competition.

== Teams ==
Below were the 168 teams involved in the qualifying phase and play-off round, grouped by their starting rounds (including 14 losing teams from the Champions League third qualifying round which entered the play-off round). The 31 winners of the play-off round qualified for the group stage to join the 7 automatic qualifiers and the 10 losing teams from the Champions League play-off round.

Key to colours
Qualified for the group stage

Play-off round
Team	Coeff
(Portugal) Sporting CP	82.069
(Russia) CSKA Moscow	80.566
(Netherlands) PSV Eindhoven	76.103
(France) Bordeaux	58.835
(Germany) VfB Stuttgart	55.037
(Ukraine) Metalist Kharkiv	52.526
(Netherlands) AZ	44.103
(Belgium) Club Brugge	35.480
(Israel) Hapoel Tel Aviv	31.400
(Italy) Lazio	29.996
(Turkey) Trabzonspor	19.810
(England) Newcastle United	16.882
(Spain) Levante	16.837
(Serbia) Partizan	14.350
(Ukraine) Dnipro Dnipropetrovsk	14.026
(Romania) Vaslui	13.764
(Romania) Dinamo București	13.264
(Netherlands) Feyenoord	12.603
(Moldova) Sheriff Tiraspol	9.849
(Hungary) Debrecen	7.950
(Greece) Atromitos	7.420
(Scotland) Heart of Midlothian	7.228
(Scotland) Motherwell	6.728
(Denmark) Midtjylland	6.505
(Belgium) Lokeren	6.480
(Switzerland) Luzern	6.360
(Czech Republic) Slovan Liberec	5.570
(Poland) Śląsk Wrocław	5.483
(Finland) HJK	5.326
(Lithuania) Ekranas	4.875
(Norway) Molde	3.935
(Luxembourg) F91 Dudelange	2.716
(Azerbaijan) Neftçi	2.241

Third qualifying round
Team	Coeff
(Italy) Internazionale	104.996
(England) Liverpool	90.882
(France) Marseille	85.835
(Spain) Athletic Bilbao	47.837
(Germany) Hannover 96	31.037
(Greece) PAOK	27.920
(Romania) Steaua București	26.764
(Czech Republic) Sparta Prague	25.570
(Netherlands) Heerenveen	20.103
(Belgium) Genk	16.480
(Turkey) Bursaspor	13.310
(Portugal) Marítimo	12.569
(Austria) Rapid Wien	12.225
(Russia) Dynamo Moscow	11.066
(Cyprus) Omonia	9.099
(Ukraine) Arsenal Kyiv	9.026
(Scotland) Dundee United	6.228
(Denmark) Horsens	5.505

Second qualifying round
Team	Coeff
(Cyprus) APOEL	33.599
(Cyprus) Anorthosis Famagusta	17.099
(Switzerland) Young Boys	16.860
(Czech Republic) Viktoria Plzeň	14.070
(Belgium) Gent	12.480
(Poland) Legia Warsaw	11.983
(Bulgaria) Levski Sofia	11.850
(Serbia) Red Star Belgrade	10.850
(Ukraine) Metalurh Donetsk	10.526
(Bulgaria) CSKA Sofia	10.350
(Russia) Anzhi Makhachkala	9.566
(Netherlands) Vitesse	9.103
(Czech Republic) Mladá Boleslav	9.070
(Romania) Rapid București	8.764
(Slovakia) Slovan Bratislava	7.974
(Croatia) Hajduk Split	7.774
(Greece) Asteras Tripolis	7.420
(Israel) Bnei Yehuda	7.400
(Turkey) Eskişehirspor	6.810
(Austria) Ried	6.725
(Sweden) AIK	5.680
(Denmark) AGF	5.505
(Norway) Aalesund	5.435
(Israel) Maccabi Netanya	5.400
(Switzerland) Servette	5.360
(Austria) Admira Wacker Mödling	5.225
(Poland) Ruch Chorzów	4.983
(Slovakia) Spartak Trnava	4.974
(Norway) Tromsø	4.935
(Croatia) Slaven Belupo	4.774
(Serbia) Vojvodina	4.350
(Scotland) St Johnstone	4.228
(Belarus) Naftan Novopolotsk	4.141
(Belarus) Shakhtyor Soligorsk	4.141
(Finland) Inter Turku	3.826
(Hungary) Videoton	3.450
(Bosnia and Herzegovina) Široki Brijeg	2.933
(Latvia) Skonto	2.924
(Bulgaria) Lokomotiv Plovdiv	2.850
(Republic of Ireland) Sligo Rovers	2.725
(Georgia (country)) Dila Gori	1.733
(Moldova) Milsami Orhei	1.599
(Lithuania) Žalgiris	1.375

First qualifying round
Team	Coeff
(Netherlands) Twente	57.103
(Poland) Lech Poznań	22.483
(Norway) Rosenborg	20.935
(Sweden) IF Elfsborg	10.180
(Sweden) Kalmar FF	7.180
(Kazakhstan) Aktobe	5.066
(Republic of Ireland) St Patrick's Athletic	4.975
(Norway) Stabæk	4.935
(Belarus) Gomel	4.641
(Georgia (country)) Metalurgi Rustavi	4.233
(Bosnia and Herzegovina) Sarajevo	4.183
(Republic of Ireland) Bohemians	3.975
(Slovakia) Senica	3.974
(Croatia) Osijek	3.774
(Iceland) FH	3.566
(Estonia) Levadia Tallinn	3.533
(Armenia) Pyunik	3.441
(Moldova) Dacia Chișinău	3.349
(Azerbaijan) Baku	3.241
(Bosnia and Herzegovina) Borac Banja Luka	3.183
(Latvia) Liepājas Metalurgs	3.174
(Wales) Bangor City	3.049
(Luxembourg) Differdange 03	2.966
(Hungary) Honvéd	2.950
(Lithuania) Sūduva	2.875
(Serbia) Jagodina	2.850
(Finland) MYPA	2.826
(Albania) Tirana	2.783
(Slovenia) Olimpija Ljubljana	2.674
(North Macedonia) Renova	2.633
(Azerbaijan) Inter Baku	2.491
(Montenegro) Rudar Pljevlja	2.375
(Finland) KuPS	2.326
(North Macedonia) Shkëndija	2.133
(Malta) Birkirkara	2.116
(Faroe Islands) EB/Streymur	2.033
(Azerbaijan) Khazar Lankaran	1.991
(Hungary) MTK Budapest	1.950
(North Macedonia) Metalurg Skopje	1.883
(Lithuania) Šiauliai	1.875
(Moldova) Zimbru Chișinău	1.849
(Finland) JJK	1.826
(Albania) Flamurtari	1.783
(Northern Ireland) Cliftonville	1.766
(Georgia (country)) Torpedo Kutaisi	1.733
(Andorra) FC Santa Coloma	1.700
(Wales) Llanelli	1.549
(Northern Ireland) Crusaders	1.516
(Luxembourg) Jeunesse Esch	1.466
(Slovenia) Celje	1.424
(Latvia) Daugava Daugavpils	1.424
(Slovenia) Mura 05	1.424
(Montenegro) Zeta	1.375
(Iceland) ÍBV	1.316
(Estonia) Narva Trans	1.283
(Malta) Floriana	1.116
(Malta) Hibernians	1.116
(Kazakhstan) Ordabasy	1.066
(Iceland) Þór	1.066
(Kazakhstan) Zhetysu	1.066
(Estonia) Nõmme Kalju	1.033
(Faroe Islands) NSÍ	1.033
(Northern Ireland) Portadown	1.016
(Luxembourg) Grevenmacher	0.966
(Armenia) Gandzasar Kapan	0.941
(Montenegro) Čelik Nikšić	0.875
(Liechtenstein) Eschen/Mauren	0.800
(Albania) Teuta	0.783
(Faroe Islands) Víkingur Gøta	0.783
(Andorra) UE Santa Coloma	0.700
(Wales) Cefn Druids	0.549
(Armenia) Shirak	0.441
(San Marino) La Fiorita	0.183
(San Marino) Libertas	0.183

Notes

1. ^{CL-CR} Losing teams from the Champions League third qualifying round (Champions Route)
2. ^{CL-LR} Losing teams from the Champions League third qualifying round (League Route)

== First qualifying round ==
=== Seeding ===
Group 1		Group 2		Group 3		Group 4	
Seeded	Unseeded	Seeded	Unseeded	Seeded	Unseeded	Seeded	Unseeded
(Kazakhstan) Aktobe (Slovakia) Senica (Bosnia and Herzegovina) Borac Banja Luka (Albania) Tirana (Azerbaijan) Inter Baku	(Hungary) MTK Budapest (Georgia (country)) Torpedo Kutaisi (Estonia) Narva Trans (Luxembourg) Grevenmacher (Montenegro) Čelik Nikšić	(Sweden) IF Elfsborg (Croatia) Osijek (Azerbaijan) Baku (Serbia) Jagodina (North Macedonia) Renova	(Andorra) FC Santa Coloma (Slovenia) Mura 05 (Malta) Floriana (Kazakhstan) Ordabasy (San Marino) Libertas	(Norway) Rosenborg (Republic of Ireland) Bohemians (Estonia) Levadia Tallinn (Luxembourg) Differdange 03 (Finland) MYPA	(Lithuania) Šiauliai (Northern Ireland) Crusaders (Iceland) Þór (Faroe Islands) NSÍ (Wales) Cefn Druids	(Netherlands) Twente (Bosnia and Herzegovina) Sarajevo (Moldova) Dacia Chișinău (Hungary) Honvéd (Montenegro) Rudar Pljevlja	(Albania) Flamurtari (Slovenia) Celje (Malta) Hibernians (Andorra) UE Santa Coloma (Armenia) Shirak
Group 5		Group 6		Group 7			
Seeded	Unseeded	Seeded	Unseeded	Seeded	Unseeded		
(Sweden) Kalmar FF (Belarus) Gomel (Iceland) FH (Lithuania) Sūduva (Finland) KuPS	(Northern Ireland) Cliftonville (Wales) Llanelli (Latvia) Daugava Daugavpils (Liechtenstein) Eschen/Mauren (Faroe Islands) Víkingur Gøta	(Poland) Lech Poznań (Georgia (country)) Metalurgi Rustavi (Armenia) Pyunik (Slovenia) Olimpija Ljubljana (Malta) Birkirkara (Azerbaijan) Khazar Lankaran	(North Macedonia) Metalurg Skopje (Luxembourg) Jeunesse Esch (Montenegro) Zeta (Kazakhstan) Zhetysu (Estonia) Nõmme Kalju (Albania) Teuta	(Republic of Ireland) St Patrick's Athletic (Norway) Stabæk (Latvia) Liepājas Metalurgs (Wales) Bangor City (North Macedonia) Shkëndija (Faroe Islands) EB/Streymur	(Moldova) Zimbru Chișinău (Finland) JJK (Iceland) ÍBV (Northern Ireland) Portadown (Armenia) Gandzasar Kapan (San Marino) La Fiorita		

=== Summary ===
The draw for the first qualifying round was held on 25 June 2012. The first legs were played on 3 and 5 July, and the second legs were played on 10 and 12 July 2012.

Team 1	Agg.	Team 2	1st leg	2nd leg
Narva Trans (Estonia)	0–7 (Note: Order of legs reversed after original draw)	(Azerbaijan) Inter Baku	0–5	0–2
MTK Budapest (Hungary)	2–3	(Slovakia) Senica	1–1	1–2
Tirana (Albania)	2–0	(Luxembourg) Grevenmacher	2–0	0–0
Torpedo Kutaisi (Georgia (country))	1–2	(Kazakhstan) Aktobe	1–1	0–1
Borac Banja Luka (Bosnia and Herzegovina)	3–3 (a)	(Montenegro) Čelik Nikšić	2–2	1–1
Baku (Azerbaijan)	0–2	(Slovenia) Mura 05	0–0	0–2
IF Elfsborg (Sweden)	12–0	(Malta) Floriana	8–0	4–0
Renova (North Macedonia)	8–0	(San Marino) Libertas	4–0	4–0
FC Santa Coloma (Andorra)	1–4	(Croatia) Osijek	0–1	1–3
Jagodina (Serbia)	0–1	(Kazakhstan) Ordabasy	0–1	0–0
Differdange 03 (Luxembourg)	6–0	(Faroe Islands) NSÍ	3–0	3–0
Crusaders (Northern Ireland)	0–4	(Norway) Rosenborg	0–3	0–1
Cefn Druids (Wales)	0–5	(Finland) MYPA	0–0	0–5
Levadia Tallinn (Estonia)	2–2 (a)	(Lithuania) Šiauliai	1–0	1–2
Bohemians (Republic of Ireland)	1–5	(Iceland) Þór	0–0	1–5
Sarajevo (Bosnia and Herzegovina)	9–6	(Malta) Hibernians	5–2	4–4
Twente (Netherlands)	9–0	(Andorra) UE Santa Coloma	6–0	3–0
Rudar Pljevlja (Montenegro)	1–2	(Armenia) Shirak	0–1	1–1
Flamurtari (Albania)	0–3	(Hungary) Honvéd	0–1	0–2
Dacia Chișinău (Moldova)	2–0	(Slovenia) Celje	1–0	1–0
Sūduva (Lithuania)	3–3 (a)	(Latvia) Daugava Daugavpils	0–1	3–2
KuPS (Finland)	3–2	(Wales) Llanelli	2–1	1–1
Cliftonville (Northern Ireland)	1–4	(Sweden) Kalmar FF	1–0	0–4
Víkingur Gøta (Faroe Islands)	0–10	(Belarus) Gomel	0–6	0–4
FH (Iceland)	3–1	(Liechtenstein) Eschen/Mauren	2–1	1–0
Lech Poznań (Poland)	3–1	(Kazakhstan) Zhetysu	2–0	1–1
Khazar Lankaran (Azerbaijan)	4–2	(Estonia) Nõmme Kalju	2–2	2–0
Birkirkara (Malta)	2–2 (a)	(North Macedonia) Metalurg Skopje	2–2	0–0
Pyunik (Armenia)	2–4	(Montenegro) Zeta	0–3	2–1
Teuta (Albania)	1–9	(Georgia (country)) Metalurgi Rustavi	0–3	1–6
Olimpija Ljubljana (Slovenia)	6–0	(Luxembourg) Jeunesse Esch	3–0	3–0
EB/Streymur (Faroe Islands)	3–3 (a)	(Armenia) Gandzasar Kapan	3–1	0–2
St Patrick's Athletic (Republic of Ireland)	2–2 (a)	(Iceland) ÍBV	1–0	1–2 (a.e.t.)
La Fiorita (San Marino)	0–6	(Latvia) Liepājas Metalurgs	0–2	0–4
JJK (Finland)	4–3	(Norway) Stabæk	2–0	2–3
Bangor City (Wales)	1–2	(Moldova) Zimbru Chișinău	0–0	1–2
Shkëndija (North Macedonia)	1–2	(Northern Ireland) Portadown	0–0	1–2

== Second qualifying round ==
=== Seeding ===
Group 1		Group 2		Group 3		Group 4	
Seeded	Unseeded	Seeded	Unseeded	Seeded	Unseeded	Seeded	Unseeded
(Poland) Lech Poznań (Croatia) Hajduk Split (Turkey) Eskişehirspor (Sweden) AIK (Belarus) Gomel	(Scotland) St Johnstone (Iceland) FH (Latvia) Skonto (North Macedonia) Renova (Azerbaijan) Khazar Lankaran	(Switzerland) Young Boys (Serbia) Red Star Belgrade (Netherlands) Vitesse (Finland) JJK (Serbia) Vojvodina	(Belarus) Naftan Novopolotsk (Montenegro) Zeta (Moldova) Zimbru Chișinău (Lithuania) Sūduva (Bulgaria) Lokomotiv Plovdiv	(Cyprus) Anorthosis Famagusta (Ukraine) Metalurh Donetsk (Czech Republic) Mladá Boleslav (Norway) Aalesund (Israel) Maccabi Netanya	(Iceland) Þór (Estonia) Levadia Tallinn (Montenegro) Čelik Nikšić (Albania) Tirana (Finland) KuPS	(Netherlands) Twente (Switzerland) Servette (Austria) Admira Wacker Mödling (Kazakhstan) Aktobe (Croatia) Slaven Belupo	(Finland) Inter Turku (Northern Ireland) Portadown (Armenia) Gandzasar Kapan (Moldova) Milsami Orhei (Lithuania) Žalgiris
Group 5		Group 6		Group 7		Group 8	
Seeded	Unseeded	Seeded	Unseeded	Seeded	Unseeded	Seeded	Unseeded
(Czech Republic) Viktoria Plzeň (Bulgaria) CSKA Sofia (Romania) Rapid București (Slovakia) Slovan Bratislava (Sweden) Kalmar FF	(Georgia (country)) Metalurgi Rustavi (Croatia) Osijek (Hungary) Videoton (Slovenia) Mura 05 (Finland) MYPA	(Belgium) Gent (Poland) Legia Warsaw (Bulgaria) Levski Sofia (Russia) Anzhi Makhachkala (Greece) Asteras Tripolis	(Bosnia and Herzegovina) Sarajevo (Latvia) Liepājas Metalurgs (Luxembourg) Differdange 03 (Hungary) Honvéd (Azerbaijan) Inter Baku	(Norway) Rosenborg (Sweden) IF Elfsborg (Israel) Bnei Yehuda (Austria) Ried (Slovakia) Spartak Trnava	(Belarus) Shakhtyor Soligorsk (Moldova) Dacia Chișinău (Kazakhstan) Ordabasy (Republic of Ireland) Sligo Rovers (Armenia) Shirak	(Cyprus) APOEL (Denmark) AGF (Poland) Ruch Chorzów (Republic of Ireland) St Patrick's Athletic (Norway) Tromsø	(Slovakia) Senica (Bosnia and Herzegovina) Široki Brijeg (Slovenia) Olimpija Ljubljana (North Macedonia) Metalurg Skopje (Georgia (country)) Dila Gori

Notes

1. ^{†} Winners of the previous round whose identity was not known at the time of the draw (teams in italics defeated a team with a higher coefficient in the previous round, thus effectively taking the coefficient of their opponent in the draw for this round)

=== Summary ===
The draw for the second qualifying round was held on 25 June 2012, immediately after the first qualifying round draw. The first legs were played on 19 July, and the second legs were played on 26 July 2012.

Team 1	Agg.	Team 2	1st leg	2nd leg
Khazar Lankaran (Azerbaijan)	1–2	(Poland) Lech Poznań	1–1	0–1
Eskişehirspor (Turkey)	3–1	(Scotland) St Johnstone	2–0	1–1
Hajduk Split (Croatia)	2–1	(Latvia) Skonto	2–0	0–1
AIK (Sweden)	2–1	(Iceland) FH	1–1	1–0
Renova (North Macedonia)	1–2	(Belarus) Gomel	0–2	1–0
Naftan Novopolotsk (Belarus)	6–7	(Serbia) Red Star Belgrade	3–4	3–3
Vojvodina (Serbia)	5–1	(Lithuania) Sūduva	1–1	4–0
JJK (Finland)	3–3 (a)	(Montenegro) Zeta	3–2	0–1
Young Boys (Switzerland)	1–1 (4–1 p)	(Moldova) Zimbru Chișinău	1–0	0–1 (a.e.t.)
Lokomotiv Plovdiv (Bulgaria)	5–7	(Netherlands) Vitesse	4–4	1–3
Tirana (Albania)	1–6	(Norway) Aalesund	1–1	0–5
Metalurh Donetsk (Ukraine)	11–2	(Montenegro) Čelik Nikšić	7–0	4–2
Maccabi Netanya (Israel)	2–2 (a)	(Finland) KuPS	1–2	1–0
Mladá Boleslav (Czech Republic)	4–0	(Iceland) Þór	3–0	1–0
Levadia Tallinn (Estonia)	1–6	(Cyprus) Anorthosis Famagusta	1–3	0–3
Milsami Orhei (Moldova)	4–5	(Kazakhstan) Aktobe	4–2	0–3
Slaven Belupo (Croatia)	10–2	(Northern Ireland) Portadown	6–0	4–2
Servette (Switzerland)	5–1	(Armenia) Gandzasar Kapan	2–0	3–1
Twente (Netherlands)	6–1	(Finland) Inter Turku	1–1	5–0
Žalgiris (Lithuania)	2–6	(Austria) Admira Wacker Mödling	1–1	1–5
Osijek (Croatia)	1–6	(Sweden) Kalmar FF	1–3	0–3
Slovan Bratislava (Slovakia)	1–1 (a)	(Hungary) Videoton	1–1	0–0
Rapid București (Romania)	5–1	(Finland) MYPA	3–1	2–0
Metalurgi Rustavi (Georgia (country))	1–5 (Note: Order of legs reversed after original draw)	(Czech Republic) Viktoria Plzeň	1–3	0–2
Mura 05 (Slovenia)	1–1 (a)	(Bulgaria) CSKA Sofia	0–0	1–1
Inter Baku (Azerbaijan)	2–2 (2–4 p)	(Greece) Asteras Tripolis	1–1	1–1 (a.e.t.)
Differdange 03 (Luxembourg)	2–4	(Belgium) Gent	0–1	2–3
Anzhi Makhachkala (Russia)	5–0	(Hungary) Honvéd	1–0	4–0
Levski Sofia (Bulgaria)	2–3	(Bosnia and Herzegovina) Sarajevo	1–0	1–3
Liepājas Metalurgs (Latvia)	3–7	(Poland) Legia Warsaw	2–2	1–5
Shakhtyor Soligorsk (Belarus)	1–1 (a)	(Austria) Ried	1–1	0–0
Bnei Yehuda (Israel)	3–0	(Armenia) Shirak	2–0	1–0
Rosenborg (Norway)	4–3	(Kazakhstan) Ordabasy	2–2	2–1
Spartak Trnava (Slovakia)	4–2	(Republic of Ireland) Sligo Rovers	3–1	1–1
Dacia Chișinău (Moldova)	1–2	(Sweden) IF Elfsborg	1–0	0–2
Široki Brijeg (Bosnia and Herzegovina)	2–3	(Republic of Ireland) St Patrick's Athletic	1–1	1–2 (a.e.t.)
APOEL (Cyprus)	3–0	(Slovakia) Senica	2–0	1–0
Ruch Chorzów (Poland)	6–1	(North Macedonia) Metalurg Skopje	3–1	3–0
AGF (Denmark)	2–5	(Georgia (country)) Dila Gori	1–2	1–3
Olimpija Ljubljana (Slovenia)	0–1	(Norway) Tromsø	0–0	0–1 (a.e.t.)

== Third qualifying round ==
=== Seeding ===
Group 1		Group 2		Group 3	
Seeded	Unseeded	Seeded	Unseeded	Seeded	Unseeded
(France) Marseille (Czech Republic) Sparta Prague (Poland) Lech Poznań (Belgium) Gent (Bosnia and Herzegovina) Sarajevo (Serbia) Red Star Belgrade	(Cyprus) Omonia (Hungary) Videoton (Turkey) Eskişehirspor (Sweden) AIK (Austria) Admira Wacker Mödling (Montenegro) Zeta	(England) Liverpool (Romania) Steaua București (Switzerland) Young Boys (Turkey) Bursaspor (Russia) Dynamo Moscow (Slovenia) Mura 05	(Ukraine) Arsenal Kyiv (Sweden) Kalmar FF (Scotland) Dundee United (Finland) KuPS (Slovakia) Spartak Trnava (Belarus) Gomel	(Spain) Athletic Bilbao (Germany) Hannover 96 (Norway) Rosenborg (Portugal) Marítimo (Poland) Legia Warsaw (Russia) Anzhi Makhachkala	(Netherlands) Vitesse (Greece) Asteras Tripolis (Austria) Ried (Switzerland) Servette (Republic of Ireland) St Patrick's Athletic (Croatia) Slaven Belupo
Group 4		Group 5			
Seeded	Unseeded	Seeded	Unseeded		
(Italy) Internazionale (Cyprus) APOEL (Netherlands) Heerenveen (Czech Republic) Viktoria Plzeň (Austria) Rapid Wien (Sweden) IF Elfsborg	(Romania) Rapid București (Croatia) Hajduk Split (Denmark) Horsens (Norway) Aalesund (Poland) Ruch Chorzów (Serbia) Vojvodina	(Netherlands) Twente (Greece) PAOK (Cyprus) Anorthosis Famagusta (Belgium) Genk (Ukraine) Metalurh Donetsk	(Czech Republic) Mladá Boleslav (Israel) Bnei Yehuda (Georgia (country)) Dila Gori (Kazakhstan) Aktobe (Norway) Tromsø		

Notes

1. ^{†} Winners of the previous round whose identity was not known at the time of the draw (teams in italics defeated a team with a higher coefficient in the previous round, thus effectively taking the coefficient of their opponent in the draw for this round)

=== Summary ===
The draw for the third qualifying rounds was held on 20 July 2012. The first legs were played on 2 August, and the second legs were played on 9 August 2012.

Team 1	Agg.	Team 2	1st leg	2nd leg
Videoton (Hungary)	4–0	(Belgium) Gent	1–0	3–0
AIK (Sweden)	3–1	(Poland) Lech Poznań	3–0	0–1
Eskişehirspor (Turkey)	1–4	(France) Marseille	1–1	0–3
Red Star Belgrade (Serbia)	0–0 (6–5 p)	(Cyprus) Omonia	0–0	0–0 (a.e.t.)
Sarajevo (Bosnia and Herzegovina)	2–2 (a)	(Montenegro) Zeta	2–1	0–1
Admira Wacker Mödling (Austria)	2–4	(Czech Republic) Sparta Prague	0–2	2–2
Kalmar FF (Sweden)	1–3	(Switzerland) Young Boys	1–0	0–3
Dundee United (Scotland)	2–7	(Russia) Dynamo Moscow	2–2	0–5
Arsenal Kyiv (Ukraine)	2–3	(Slovenia) Mura 05	0–3 (Note: UEFA awarded Mura 05 a 3–0 win due to Arsenal Kyiv fielding suspended player Éric Matoukou in the first leg. The original match had ended in a 3–0 win for Arsenal Kyiv.)	2–0
KuPS (Finland)	1–6 (Note: Order of legs reversed after original draw.)	(Turkey) Bursaspor	1–0	0–6
Steaua București (Romania)	3–1	(Slovakia) Spartak Trnava	0–1	3–0
Gomel (Belarus)	0–4	(England) Liverpool	0–1	0–3
Ried (Austria)	3–4	(Poland) Legia Warsaw	2–1	1–3
St Patrick's Athletic (Republic of Ireland)	0–5	(Germany) Hannover 96	0–3	0–2
Servette (Switzerland)	1–1 (a)	(Norway) Rosenborg	1–1	0–0
Athletic Bilbao (Spain)	4–3	(Croatia) Slaven Belupo	3–1	1–2
Anzhi Makhachkala (Russia)	4–0	(Netherlands) Vitesse	2–0	2–0
Asteras Tripolis (Greece)	1–1 (a)	(Portugal) Marítimo	1–1	0–0
Heerenveen (Netherlands)	4–1	(Romania) Rapid București	4–0	0–1
Ruch Chorzów (Poland)	0–7	(Czech Republic) Viktoria Plzeň	0–2	0–5
Horsens (Denmark)	4–3	(Sweden) IF Elfsborg	1–1	3–2
APOEL (Cyprus)	3–1	(Norway) Aalesund	2–1	1–0
Hajduk Split (Croatia)	2–3	(Italy) Internazionale	0–3	2–0
Vojvodina (Serbia)	2–3	(Austria) Rapid Wien	2–1	0–2
Genk (Belgium)	4–2	(Kazakhstan) Aktobe	2–1	2–1
Tromsø (Norway)	2–1	(Ukraine) Metalurh Donetsk	1–1	1–0
Twente (Netherlands)	4–0	(Czech Republic) Mladá Boleslav	2–0	2–0
Bnei Yehuda (Israel)	1–6	(Greece) PAOK	0–2	1–4
Dila Gori (Georgia (country))	3–1	(Cyprus) Anorthosis Famagusta	0–1	3–0 (Note: The match was abandoned in the 82nd minute due to crowd disturbance. Dila Gori was leading 3–0. That result was confirmed standing by UEFA.)

== Play-off round ==
=== Seeding ===
Group 1		Group 2		Group 3	
Seeded	Unseeded	Seeded	Unseeded	Seeded	Unseeded
(Italy) Internazionale (Netherlands) AZ (Cyprus) APOEL (England) Newcastle United (Serbia) Partizan	(Romania) Vaslui (Russia) Anzhi Makhachkala (Greece) Atromitos (Norway) Tromsø (Azerbaijan) Neftçi	(England) Liverpool (Spain) Athletic Bilbao (Belgium) Club Brugge (Netherlands) Heerenveen (Georgia (country)) Dila Gori	(Portugal) Marítimo (Hungary) Debrecen (Scotland) Heart of Midlothian (Finland) HJK (Norway) Molde	(France) Marseille (Ukraine) Metalist Kharkiv (Germany) Hannover 96 (Turkey) Trabzonspor (Switzerland) Young Boys	(Romania) Dinamo București (Moldova) Sheriff Tiraspol (Denmark) Midtjylland (Poland) Śląsk Wrocław (Hungary) Videoton
Group 4		Group 5		Group 6	
Seeded	Unseeded	Seeded	Unseeded	Seeded	Unseeded
(Portugal) Sporting CP (France) Bordeaux (Israel) Hapoel Tel Aviv (Czech Republic) Sparta Prague (Spain) Levante	(Netherlands) Feyenoord (Serbia) Red Star Belgrade (Scotland) Motherwell (Denmark) Horsens (Luxembourg) F91 Dudelange	(Russia) CSKA Moscow (Netherlands) Twente (Italy) Lazio (Norway) Rosenborg (Czech Republic) Viktoria Plzeň	(Turkey) Bursaspor (Poland) Legia Warsaw (Belgium) Lokeren (Sweden) AIK (Slovenia) Mura 05	(Netherlands) PSV Eindhoven (Germany) VfB Stuttgart (Greece) PAOK (Romania) Steaua București (Belgium) Genk (Ukraine) Dnipro Dnipropetrovsk	(Austria) Rapid Wien (Russia) Dynamo Moscow (Switzerland) Luzern (Czech Republic) Slovan Liberec (Lithuania) Ekranas (Montenegro) Zeta

Notes

1. ^{†} Winners of the previous round whose identity was not known at the time of the draw, due to the abandonment of the second leg between Dila Gori and Anorthosis (Dila Gori was later declared as the winner, thus effectively taking the coefficient of Anorthosis, who has a higher coefficient, in the draw for this round)

=== Summary ===
The draw for the play-off round was held on 10 August 2012. The first legs were played on 22 and 23 August, and the second legs were played on 28 and 30 August 2012.

Team 1	Agg.	Team 2	1st leg	2nd leg
Anzhi Makhachkala (Russia)	6–0	(Netherlands) AZ	1–0	5–0
Neftçi (Azerbaijan)	4–2 (Note: Order of legs reversed after original draw)	(Cyprus) APOEL	1–1	3–1
Atromitos (Greece)	1–2	(England) Newcastle United	1–1	0–1
Tromsø (Norway)	3–3 (a)	(Serbia) Partizan	3–2	0–1
Vaslui (Romania)	2–4	(Italy) Internazionale	0–2	2–2
Heart of Midlothian (Scotland)	1–2	(England) Liverpool	0–1	1–1
Athletic Bilbao (Spain)	9–3	(Finland) HJK	6–0	3–3
Marítimo (Portugal)	3–0	(Georgia (country)) Dila Gori	1–0	2–0
Molde (Norway)	4–1	(Netherlands) Heerenveen	2–0	2–1
Debrecen (Hungary)	1–7	(Belgium) Club Brugge	0–3	1–4
Sheriff Tiraspol (Moldova)	1–2	(France) Marseille	1–2	0–0
Trabzonspor (Turkey)	0–0 (2–4 p)	(Hungary) Videoton	0–0	0–0 (a.e.t.)
Midtjylland (Denmark)	2–3	(Switzerland) Young Boys	0–3	2–0
Śląsk Wrocław (Poland)	4–10	(Germany) Hannover 96	3–5	1–5
Dinamo București (Romania)	1–4	(Ukraine) Metalist Kharkiv	0–2	1–2
Horsens (Denmark)	1–6	(Portugal) Sporting CP	1–1	0–5
F91 Dudelange (Luxembourg)	1–7	(Israel) Hapoel Tel Aviv	1–3	0–4
Feyenoord (Netherlands)	2–4	(Czech Republic) Sparta Prague	2–2	0–2
Motherwell (Scotland)	0–3	(Spain) Levante	0–2	0–1
Red Star Belgrade (Serbia)	2–3	(France) Bordeaux	0–0	2–3
Lokeren (Belgium)	2–2 (a)	(Czech Republic) Viktoria Plzeň	2–1	0–1
Mura 05 (Slovenia)	1–5	(Italy) Lazio	0–2	1–3
AIK (Sweden)	2–1	(Russia) CSKA Moscow	0–1	2–0
Legia Warsaw (Poland)	2–3	(Norway) Rosenborg	1–1	1–2
Bursaspor (Turkey)	4–5	(Netherlands) Twente	3–1	1–4 (a.e.t.)
Ekranas (Lithuania)	0–5	(Romania) Steaua București	0–2	0–3
Slovan Liberec (Czech Republic)	4–6	(Ukraine) Dnipro Dnipropetrovsk	2–2	2–4
VfB Stuttgart (Germany)	3–1	(Russia) Dynamo Moscow	2–0	1–1
PAOK (Greece)	2–4	(Austria) Rapid Wien	2–1	0–3
Luzern (Switzerland)	2–3	(Belgium) Genk	2–1	0–2
Zeta (Montenegro)	0–14	(Netherlands) PSV Eindhoven	0–5	0–9

== Statistics ==
There were 757 goals in 274 matches in the qualifying phase and play-off round, for an average of 2.76 goals per match.

=== Top goalscorers ===
Rank	Player	Team	Goals	Minutes played
1	(Netherlands) Leroy Fer	(Netherlands) Twente	6	596'
1	(Czech Republic) Bořek Dočkal	(Norway) Rosenborg	6	630'
3	(Sweden) Lasse Nilsson	(Sweden) IF Elfsborg	5	383'
3	(Georgia (country)) Mate Vatsadze	(Georgia (country)) Dila Gori	5	434'
3	(Belgium) Nacer Chadli	(Netherlands) Twente	5	484'
3	(Slovakia) Michal Ďuriš	(Czech Republic) Viktoria Plzeň	5	522'
3	(Cameroon) Samuel Eto'o	(Russia) Anzhi Makhachkala	5	530'
8	(Slovenia) Tim Matavž	(Netherlands) PSV Eindhoven	4	180'
8	(Austria) Deni Alar	(Austria) Rapid Wien	4	203'
8	(Georgia (country)) Dimitri Tatanashvilli	(Georgia (country)) Metalurgi Rustavi	4	233'
8	(France) Omar Er Rafik	(Luxembourg) Differdange 03	4	347'
8	(Netherlands) Glynor Plet	(Netherlands) Twente	4	348'
8	(Greece) Stefanos Athanasiadis	(Greece) PAOK	4	360'
8	(Hungary) Tamás Gruborovics	(Finland) JJK	4	360'
8	(Poland) Marek Saganowski	(Poland) Legia Warsaw	4	425'
8	(Bosnia and Herzegovina) Asmir Suljić	(Bosnia and Herzegovina) Sarajevo	4	502'

Source: UEFA

=== Top assists ===
Rank	Player	Team	Assists	Minutes played
1	(Belgium) Nacer Chadli	(Netherlands) Twente	5	484'
1	(Serbia) Darko Lazović	(Serbia) Red Star Belgrade	5	532'
1	(Serbia) Dušan Tadić	(Netherlands) Twente	5	584'
4	(Croatia) Petar Brlek	(Croatia) Slaven Belupo	4	180'
4	(Sweden) Amadou Jawo	(Sweden) IF Elfsborg	4	192'
4	(Serbia) Miroslav Radović	(Poland) Legia Warsaw	4	518'
4	(Norway) Ruben Yttergård Jenssen	(Norway) Tromsø	4	570'
8	(Netherlands) Jetro Willems	(Netherlands) PSV Eindhoven	3	46'
8	(Israel) Omer Damari	(Israel) Hapoel Tel Aviv	3	136'
8	(Germany) Konstantin Rausch	(Germany) Hannover 96	3	174'
8	(Brazil) Jackson Lima	(Malta) Hibernians	3	180'
8	(Poland) Sebastian Mila	(Poland) Śląsk Wrocław	3	180'
8	(Israel) Lior Refaelov	(Belgium) Club Brugge	3	180'
8	(Russia) Aleksandr Kokorin	(Russia) Dynamo Moscow	3	270'
8	(Romania) Adrian Piț	(Azerbaijan) Khazar Lankaran	3	350'
8	(Georgia (country)) Irakli Maisuradze	(Georgia (country)) Metalurgi Rustavi	3	360'
8	(Belarus) Artur Lyavitski	(Belarus) Gomel	3	398'
8	(Bosnia and Herzegovina) Said Husejinović	(Bosnia and Herzegovina) Sarajevo	3	488'
8	(Czech Republic) David Limberský	(Czech Republic) Viktoria Plzeň	3	521'

Source: UEFA
