= 2012–13 UEFA Europa League qualifying (first and second round matches) =

European football competition

This page summarises the matches of the first and second qualifying rounds of 2012–13 UEFA Europa League qualifying.

Times are CEST (UTC+2), as listed by UEFA (local times, if different, are in parentheses).

== First qualifying round ==
=== Summary ===
The draw for the first qualifying round was held on 25 June 2012. The first legs were played on 3 and 5 July, and the second legs were played on 10 and 12 July 2012.

Team 1	Agg.	Team 2	1st leg	2nd leg
Narva Trans (Estonia)	0–7 (Note: Order of legs reversed after original draw)	(Azerbaijan) Inter Baku	0–5	0–2
MTK Budapest (Hungary)	2–3	(Slovakia) Senica	1–1	1–2
Tirana (Albania)	2–0	(Luxembourg) Grevenmacher	2–0	0–0
Torpedo Kutaisi (Georgia (country))	1–2	(Kazakhstan) Aktobe	1–1	0–1
Borac Banja Luka (Bosnia and Herzegovina)	3–3 (a)	(Montenegro) Čelik Nikšić	2–2	1–1
Baku (Azerbaijan)	0–2	(Slovenia) Mura 05	0–0	0–2
IF Elfsborg (Sweden)	12–0	(Malta) Floriana	8–0	4–0
Renova (North Macedonia)	8–0	(San Marino) Libertas	4–0	4–0
FC Santa Coloma (Andorra)	1–4	(Croatia) Osijek	0–1	1–3
Jagodina (Serbia)	0–1	(Kazakhstan) Ordabasy	0–1	0–0
Differdange 03 (Luxembourg)	6–0	(Faroe Islands) NSÍ	3–0	3–0
Crusaders (Northern Ireland)	0–4	(Norway) Rosenborg	0–3	0–1
Cefn Druids (Wales)	0–5	(Finland) MYPA	0–0	0–5
Levadia Tallinn (Estonia)	2–2 (a)	(Lithuania) Šiauliai	1–0	1–2
Bohemians (Republic of Ireland)	1–5	(Iceland) Þór	0–0	1–5
Sarajevo (Bosnia and Herzegovina)	9–6	(Malta) Hibernians	5–2	4–4
Twente (Netherlands)	9–0	(Andorra) UE Santa Coloma	6–0	3–0
Rudar Pljevlja (Montenegro)	1–2	(Armenia) Shirak	0–1	1–1
Flamurtari (Albania)	0–3	(Hungary) Honvéd	0–1	0–2
Dacia Chișinău (Moldova)	2–0	(Slovenia) Celje	1–0	1–0
Sūduva (Lithuania)	3–3 (a)	(Latvia) Daugava Daugavpils	0–1	3–2
KuPS (Finland)	3–2	(Wales) Llanelli	2–1	1–1
Cliftonville (Northern Ireland)	1–4	(Sweden) Kalmar FF	1–0	0–4
Víkingur Gøta (Faroe Islands)	0–10	(Belarus) Gomel	0–6	0–4
FH (Iceland)	3–1	(Liechtenstein) Eschen/Mauren	2–1	1–0
Lech Poznań (Poland)	3–1	(Kazakhstan) Zhetysu	2–0	1–1
Khazar Lankaran (Azerbaijan)	4–2	(Estonia) Nõmme Kalju	2–2	2–0
Birkirkara (Malta)	2–2 (a)	(North Macedonia) Metalurg Skopje	2–2	0–0
Pyunik (Armenia)	2–4	(Montenegro) Zeta	0–3	2–1
Teuta (Albania)	1–9	(Georgia (country)) Metalurgi Rustavi	0–3	1–6
Olimpija Ljubljana (Slovenia)	6–0	(Luxembourg) Jeunesse Esch	3–0	3–0
EB/Streymur (Faroe Islands)	3–3 (a)	(Armenia) Gandzasar Kapan	3–1	0–2
St Patrick's Athletic (Republic of Ireland)	2–2 (a)	(Iceland) ÍBV	1–0	1–2 (a.e.t.)
La Fiorita (San Marino)	0–6	(Latvia) Liepājas Metalurgs	0–2	0–4
JJK (Finland)	4–3	(Norway) Stabæk	2–0	2–3
Bangor City (Wales)	1–2	(Moldova) Zimbru Chișinău	0–0	1–2
Shkëndija (North Macedonia)	1–2	(Northern Ireland) Portadown	0–0	1–2

=== Matches ===
5 July 2012
17:30

Narva Trans (Estonia)	0–5	(Azerbaijan) Inter Baku
	Report	Tskhadadze 11', 35'; Mammadov 62'; Adamia 70'; Hajiyev 76' (pen.)

Rakvere linnastaadion, Rakvere (Note: Narva Trans played their home match at Rakvere linnastaadion, Rakvere instead of their regular stadium, Kreenholmi Stadium, Narva.)
Attendance: 300
Referee: Alexandre Boucaut (Belgium)
12 July 2012
18:00

Inter Baku (Azerbaijan)	2–0	(Estonia) Narva Trans
Georgievski 21'; Hajiyev 86'	Report

Dalga Arena, Baku (Note: Inter Baku played their home match at Dalga Arena, Baku instead of their regular stadium, Shafa Stadium, Baku.)
Attendance: 990
Referee: Kevin Clancy (Scotland)

Inter Baku won 7–0 on aggregate.

5 July 2012
20:15

MTK Budapest (Hungary)	1–1	(Slovakia) Senica
Lazok 30'	Report	Blackburn 58'

Hidegkuti Nándor Stadium, Budapest
Attendance: 800
Referee: João Ferreira (Portugal)
12 July 2012
19:30

Senica (Slovakia)	2–1	(Hungary) MTK Budapest
Blackburn 72'; Kalabiška 87'	Report	Kanta 51' (pen.)

Štadión FK Senica, Senica
Attendance: 2,684
Referee: Oleksandr Derdo (Ukraine)

Senica won 3–2 on aggregate.

5 July 2012
19:00

Tirana (Albania)	2–0	(Luxembourg) Grevenmacher
Muçollari 40'; Ferraj 45+2'	Report

Qemal Stafa Stadium, Tirana (Note: Tirana played their home match at Qemal Stafa Stadium, Tirana instead of their regular stadium, Selman Stërmasi Stadium, Tirana.)
Attendance: 3,000
Referee: Vitaly Sevostyanik (Belarus)
10 July 2012
17:45

Grevenmacher (Luxembourg)	0–0	(Albania) Tirana
	Report

Stade Jos Nosbaum, Dudelange (Note: Grevenmacher played their home match at Stade Jos Nosbaum, Dudelange instead of their regular stadium, Op Flohr Stadion, Grevenmacher.)
Attendance: 546
Referee: Domagoj Vučkov (Croatia)

Tirana won 2–0 on aggregate.

5 July 2012
19:00

Torpedo Kutaisi (Georgia (country))	1–1	(Kazakhstan) Aktobe
Sabanadze 62'	Report	Bikmaev 82'

Givi Kiladze Stadium, Kutaisi
Attendance: 5,160
Referee: Tolga Özkalfa (Turkey)
12 July 2012
17:00

Aktobe (Kazakhstan)	1–0	(Georgia (country)) Torpedo Kutaisi
Bikmaev 75'	Report

Central Stadium, Aktobe
Attendance: 12,000
Referee: Adam Lyczmański (Poland)

Aktobe won 2–1 on aggregate.

5 July 2012
21:05

Borac Banja Luka (Bosnia and Herzegovina)	2–2	(Montenegro) Čelik Nikšić
Stokić 39'; Dugić 42'	Report	Bojić 36' (pen.); Agović 83'

Gradski stadion, Banja Luka
Attendance: 5,000
Referee: Serdar Gözübüyük (Netherlands)
12 July 2012
17:30

Čelik Nikšić (Montenegro)	1–1	(Bosnia and Herzegovina) Borac Banja Luka
Milić 54' (o.g.)	Report	Grahovac 58'

Gradski stadion, Nikšić (Note: Čelik Nikšić played their home match at Gradski stadion, Nikšić instead of their regular stadium, Stadion Željezare, Nikšić.)
Attendance: 3,980
Referee: Nikolaj Hänni (Switzerland)

3–3 on aggregate; Čelik Nikšić won on away goals.

5 July 2012
18:00

Baku (Azerbaijan)	0–0	(Slovenia) Mura 05
	Report

Dalga Arena, Baku (Note: Baku played their home match at Dalga Arena, Baku instead of their regular stadium, Tofiq Bahramov Stadium, Baku.)
Attendance: 3,024
Referee: Sergiy Dankovskyy (Ukraine)
12 July 2012
20:00

Mura 05 (Slovenia)	2–0	(Azerbaijan) Baku
Eterović 26'; Fajić 83'	Report

Športni park, Lendava (Note: Mura 05 played their home match at Športni park, Lendava instead of their regular stadium, Fazanerija City Stadium, Murska Sobota, as it did not meet UEFA requirements.)
Attendance: 2,000
Referee: Athanassios Giachos (Greece)

Mura 05 won 2–0 on aggregate.

5 July 2012
18:00

IF Elfsborg (Sweden)	8–0	(Malta) Floriana
Hult 5', 24', 26' (pen.); Jawo 10'; Nilsson 37'; Claesson 51'; Frick 54'; J. Larsson 62'	Report

Borås Arena, Borås
Attendance: 2,653
Referee: John Beaton (Scotland)
10 July 2012
17:30

Floriana (Malta)	0–4	(Sweden) IF Elfsborg
	Report	Mobaeck 19'; Hiljemark 50'; Frick 67'; Claesson 77'

Hibernians Ground, Paola
Attendance: 266
Referee: Nikola Popov (Bulgaria)

IF Elfsborg won 12–0 on aggregate.

5 July 2012
17:30

Renova (North Macedonia)	4–0	(San Marino) Libertas
Bajrami 10' (pen.), 14' (pen.), 83'; Skenderi 60'	Report

Milano Arena, Kumanovo (Note: Renova played their home match at Milano Arena, Kumanovo instead of their regular stadium, Gradski stadion, Tetovo.)
Attendance: 612
Referee: Danilo Grujić (Serbia)
12 July 2012
20:30

Libertas (San Marino)	0–4	(North Macedonia) Renova
	Report	Nuhi 16'; Jančevski 61', 64' (pen.); Ismaili 87'

Stadio Olimpico, Serravalle
Attendance: 288
Referee: Robert Rogers (Republic of Ireland)

Renova won 8–0 on aggregate.

5 July 2012
19:30

FC Santa Coloma (Andorra)	0–1	(Croatia) Osijek
	Report	Miličević 77'

Estadi Comunal, Andorra la Vella
Attendance: 400
Referee: Sergejus Slyva (Lithuania)
12 July 2012
20:00

Osijek (Croatia)	3–1	(Andorra) FC Santa Coloma
Kvržić 28'; Perošević 56'; Jugović 70'	Report	Bousenine 81'

Stadion Gradski vrt, Osijek
Attendance: 1,200
Referee: Vasilis Dimitriou (Cyprus)

Osijek won 4–1 on aggregate.

5 July 2012
17:30

Jagodina (Serbia)	0–1	(Kazakhstan) Ordabasy
	Report	Mansour 85'

Stadion FK Jagodina, Jagodina
Attendance: 4,000
Referee: Radu Marian Petrescu (Romania)
12 July 2012
16:00

Ordabasy (Kazakhstan)	0–0	(Serbia) Jagodina
	Report

Central Stadium, Almaty (Note: Ordabasy played their home match at Central Stadium, Almaty instead of their regular stadium, Kazhimukan Munaitpasov Stadium, Shymkent.)
Attendance: 15,500
Referee: Yunus Yıldırım (Turkey)

Ordabasy won 1–0 on aggregate.

5 July 2012
18:30

Differdange 03 (Luxembourg)	3–0	(Faroe Islands) NSÍ
Kettenmeyer 31'; Bettmer 41'; Er Rafik 47'	Report

Stade de la Frontière, Esch-sur-Alzette (Note: Differdange 03 played their home match at Stade de la Frontière, Esch-sur-Alzette instead of their regular stadium, Stade du Thillenberg, Differdange.)
Attendance: 820
Referee: Bardhyl Pashaj (Albania)
12 July 2012
19:30

NSÍ (Faroe Islands)	0–3	(Luxembourg) Differdange 03
	Report	Er Rafik 14', 45'; Albanese 73'

Gundadalur, Tórshavn (Note: NSÍ played their home match at Gundadalur, Tórshavn instead of their regular stadium, Runavík Stadium, Runavík.)
Attendance: 350
Referee: Milenko Vukadinović (Serbia)

Differdange 03 won 6–0 on aggregate.

5 July 2012
21:00

Crusaders (Northern Ireland)	0–3	(Norway) Rosenborg
	Report	Dorsin 19', 76'; Dočkal 71'

Seaview, Belfast
Attendance: 862
Referee: Dawid Piasecki (Poland)
12 July 2012
19:00

Rosenborg (Norway)	1–0	(Northern Ireland) Crusaders
Ankersen 81'	Report

Lerkendal Stadion, Trondheim
Attendance: 3,688
Referee: Jonathan Lardot (Belgium)

Rosenborg won 4–0 on aggregate.

5 July 2012
20:30

Cefn Druids (Wales)	0–0	(Finland) MYPA
	Report

Racecourse Ground, Wrexham (Note: Cefn Druids played their home match at Racecourse Ground, Wrexham instead of their regular stadium, The Rock, Rhosymedre.)
Attendance: 813
Referee: Nikola Dabanović (Montenegro)
12 July 2012
18:30

MYPA (Finland)	5–0	(Wales) Cefn Druids
Nongotamba 25'; Saxman 37'; Williams 44'; O'Neill 47'; Opoku 70'	Report

Lahden Stadion, Lahti (Note: MYPA played their home match at Lahden Stadion, Lahti instead of their regular stadium, Saviniemi, Kouvola.)
Attendance: 1,820
Referee: Ioannis Anastasiou (Cyprus)

MYPA won 5–0 on aggregate.

5 July 2012
17:45

Levadia Tallinn (Estonia)	1–0	(Lithuania) Šiauliai
Juvenal 63' (o.g.)	Report

Kadrioru Stadium, Tallinn
Attendance: 850
Referee: Georgi Vadachkoria (Georgia)
12 July 2012
18:00

Šiauliai (Lithuania)	2–1	(Estonia) Levadia Tallinn
Rimkevičius 40' (pen.); Kozlovs 80'	Report	Rättel 76'

Savivaldybė Stadium, Šiauliai
Attendance: 1,480
Referee: Orel Grinfeeld (Israel)

2–2 on aggregate; Levadia Tallinn won on away goals.

5 July 2012
20:45

Bohemians (Republic of Ireland)	0–0	(Iceland) Þór
	Report

Dalymount Park, Dublin
Attendance: 1,253
Referee: Jovan Kaludjerović (Montenegro)
12 July 2012
20:30

Þór (Iceland)	5–1	(Republic of Ireland) Bohemians
Kristjánsson 36', 73', 90+3'; Hjaltalín 39'; Feely 50' (o.g.)	Report	Scully 23'

Þórsvöllur, Akureyri
Attendance: 934
Referee: Igor Pristovnik (Croatia)

Þór won 5–1 on aggregate.

5 July 2012
19:30

Sarajevo (Bosnia and Herzegovina)	5–2	(Malta) Hibernians
Suljić 2'; Torlak 45+1'; Karamatić 54' (pen.); Hadžić 79'; Tatomirović 90'	Report	J. Farrugia 20'; Rodolfo Soares 33'

Asim Ferhatović Hase Stadium, Sarajevo
Attendance: 7,000
Referee: Goran Spirkoski (Macedonia)
12 July 2012
19:30

Hibernians (Malta)	4–4	(Bosnia and Herzegovina) Sarajevo
Dias 22', 35'; Farrugia 40', 44'	Report	Hadžić 13', 27'; Suljić 23'; Šunjevarić 90'

Hibernians Ground, Paola
Attendance: 700
Referee: Ádám Németh (Hungary)

Sarajevo won 9–6 on aggregate.

5 July 2012
19:45

Twente (Netherlands)	6–0	(Andorra) UE Santa Coloma
Schilder 28', 29'; Tadić 63'; John 71'; Plet 77', 79'	Report

De Grolsch Veste, Enschede
Attendance: 18,000
Referee: Enea Jorgji (Albania)
12 July 2012
19:30

UE Santa Coloma (Andorra)	0–3	(Netherlands) Twente
	Report	Janssen 19' (pen.); Wisgerhof 29'; Plet 34'

Estadi Comunal, Andorra la Vella
Attendance: 710
Referee: Chris Reisch (Luxembourg)

Twente won 9–0 on aggregate.

5 July 2012
18:00

Rudar Pljevlja (Montenegro)	0–1	(Armenia) Shirak
	Report	Ly 71'

Gradski stadion, Nikšić (Note: Rudar Pljevlja played their home match at Gradski stadion, Nikšić instead of their regular stadium, Gradski stadion, Pljevlja.)
Attendance: 400
Referee: Jari Järvinen (Finland)
12 July 2012
16:00

Shirak (Armenia)	1–1	(Montenegro) Rudar Pljevlja
Diop 14'	Report	Mkoyan 11' (o.g.)

City Stadium, Gyumri
Attendance: 2,655
Referee: Nerijus Dunauskas (Lithuania)

Shirak won 2–1 on aggregate.

5 July 2012
20:30

Flamurtari (Albania)	0–1	(Hungary) Honvéd
	Report	Vernes 46'

Flamurtari Stadium, Vlorë
Attendance: 3,000
Referee: Sven Bindels (Luxembourg)
12 July 2012
20:30

Honvéd (Hungary)	2–0	(Albania) Flamurtari
Vernes 45+1'; Tchami 57'	Report

Bozsik Stadion, Budapest
Attendance: 1,708
Referee: Vusal Aliyev (Azerbaijan)

Honvéd won 3–0 on aggregate.

5 July 2012
18:30

Dacia Chișinău (Moldova)	1–0	(Slovenia) Celje
Sow 42'	Report

Zimbru Stadium, Chișinău
Attendance: 4,052
Referee: Georgi Yordanov (Bulgaria)
12 July 2012
20:00

Celje (Slovenia)	0–1	(Moldova) Dacia Chișinău
	Report	Mihaliov 32' (pen.)

Arena Petrol, Celje
Attendance: 1,500
Referee: Gerhard Grobelnik (Austria)

Dacia Chișinău won 2–0 on aggregate.

5 July 2012
18:30

Sūduva (Lithuania)	0–1	(Latvia) Daugava Daugavpils
	Report	Kovaļovs 87'

Sūduva Stadium, Marijampolė
Attendance: 1,000
Referee: Anatoliy Abdula (Ukraine)
12 July 2012
18:00

Daugava Daugavpils (Latvia)	2–3	(Lithuania) Sūduva
Ibe 52', 54'	Report	Šoblinskas 8'; Rafael Ledesma 45+1', 84'

Celtnieks Stadium, Daugavpils
Attendance: 1,000
Referee: Stephan Klossner (Switzerland)

3–3 on aggregate; Sūduva won on away goals.

5 July 2012
17:30

KuPS (Finland)	2–1	(Wales) Llanelli
Joenmäki 5' (pen.); Purje 19'	Report	J. Bowen 45+1'

Savon Sanomat Areena, Kuopio
Attendance: 1,870
Referee: Christopher Lautier (Malta)
12 July 2012
19:30

Llanelli (Wales)	1–1	(Finland) KuPS
L. Bowen 50' (pen.)	Report	Paananen 59'

Stebonheath Park, Llanelli
Attendance: 534
Referee: Þóroddur Hjaltalin (Iceland)

KuPS won 3–2 on aggregate.

5 July 2012
20:45

Cliftonville (Northern Ireland)	1–0	(Sweden) Kalmar FF
Boyce 71'	Report

Solitude, Belfast
Attendance: 1,106
Referee: Adrien Jaccottet (Switzerland)
12 July 2012
19:00

Kalmar FF (Sweden)	4–0	(Northern Ireland) Cliftonville
Israelsson 10'; Đorđević 16'; Dauda 38'; Berisha 90+1' (pen.)	Report

Guldfågeln Arena, Kalmar
Attendance: 3,824
Referee: Peter Královič (Slovakia)

Kalmar FF won 4–1 on aggregate.

3 July 2012
17:30

Víkingur Gøta (Faroe Islands)	0–6	(Belarus) Gomel
	Report	Hleb 53', 55'; Voronkov 57'; Aleksiyevich 58'; Kashewski 69'; Lyavitski 80'

Gundadalur, Tórshavn (Note: Víkingur Gøta played their home match at Gundadalur, Tórshavn instead of their regular stadium, Serpugerði Stadium, Norðragøta.)
Attendance: 250
Referee: Andris Treimanis (Latvia)
12 July 2012
18:00

Gomel (Belarus)	4–0	(Faroe Islands) Víkingur Gøta
Dzemidovich 49', 56'; Kashewski 71'; Tsimashenka 88'	Report

Central Stadium, Gomel
Attendance: 6,500
Referee: Dennis Antamo (Finland)

Gomel won 10–0 on aggregate.

5 July 2012
21:15

FH (Iceland)	2–1	(Liechtenstein) Eschen/Mauren
Ingason 44'; Björnsson 81'	Report	Fässler 48'

Kaplakriki, Hafnarfjörður
Attendance: 1,290
Referee: Denis Scherbakov (Belarus)
12 July 2012
19:30

Eschen/Mauren (Liechtenstein)	0–1	(Iceland) FH
	Report	Guðnason 12'

Sportpark Eschen-Mauren, Eschen
Attendance: 500
Referee: Clayton Pisani (Malta)

FH won 3–1 on aggregate.

5 July 2012
20:00

Lech Poznań (Poland)	2–0	(Kazakhstan) Zhetysu
Murawski 61'; Lovrencsics 65'	Report

Stadion Miejski, Poznań
Attendance: 23,108
Referee: Luc Wouters (Belgium)
12 July 2012
14:00

Zhetysu (Kazakhstan)	1–1	(Poland) Lech Poznań
Muzhikov 44'	Report	Ślusarski 13'

Zhetysu Stadium, Taldykorgan
Attendance: 3,700
Referee: Sergey Tsinkevich (Belarus)

Lech Poznań won 3–1 on aggregate.

5 July 2012
17:00

Khazar Lankaran (Azerbaijan)	2–2	(Estonia) Nõmme Kalju
Subašić 7'; Scarlatache 30'	Report	Wakui 5'; E. Puri 70'

City Stadium, Lankaran
Attendance: 15,500
Referee: Mitja Žganec (Slovenia)
10 July 2012
17:45

Nõmme Kalju (Estonia)	0–2	(Azerbaijan) Khazar Lankaran
	Report	Abishov 41'; Subašić 85'

Kadrioru Stadium, Tallinn (Note: Nõmme Kalju played their home match at Kadrioru Stadium, Tallinn instead of their regular stadium, Hiiu Stadium, Tallinn.)
Attendance: 1,281
Referee: Dag Vidar Hafsås (Norway)

Khazar Lankaran won 4–2 on aggregate.

5 July 2012
19:00

Birkirkara (Malta)	2–2	(North Macedonia) Metalurg Skopje
Jorge Santos 53'; Triganza 87'	Report	Nestorovski 2'; Čurlinov 55'

Hibernians Ground, Paola
Attendance: 610
Referee: Ivaylo Stoyanov (Bulgaria)
12 July 2012
17:00

Metalurg Skopje (North Macedonia)	0–0	(Malta) Birkirkara
	Report

Milano Arena, Kumanovo (Note: Metalurg Skopje played their home match at Milano Arena, Kumanovo instead of their regular stadium, Železarnica Stadium, Skopje.)
Attendance: 380
Referee: Alexander Harkam (Austria)

2–2 on aggregate; Metalurg Skopje won on away goals.

5 July 2012
18:00

Pyunik (Armenia)	0–3	(Montenegro) Zeta
	Report	Vujačić 62'; Z. Peličić 81'; Orlandić 90+2'

Republican Stadium, Yerevan
Attendance: 2,545
Referee: Markus Hameter (Austria)
12 July 2012
20:00

Zeta (Montenegro)	1–2	(Armenia) Pyunik
M. B. Radulović 16'	Report	Tatoyan 19'; Poghosyan 88'

Stadion Pod Goricom, Podgorica (Note: Zeta played their home match at Stadion Pod Goricom, Podgorica instead of their regular stadium, Stadion Trešnjica, Golubovci.)
Attendance: 1,000
Referee: Aleksandr Gauzer (Kazakhstan)

Zeta won 4–2 on aggregate.

5 July 2012
20:30

Teuta (Albania)	0–3	(Georgia (country)) Metalurgi Rustavi
	Report	Tatanashvilli 77'; Kvaratskhelia 84', 90+2' (pen.)

Niko Dovana Stadium, Durrës
Attendance: 850
Referee: Padraig Sutton (Republic of Ireland)
12 July 2012
16:00

Metalurgi Rustavi (Georgia (country))	6–1	(Albania) Teuta
Tekturmanidze 14', 19'; Tatanashvilli 37', 69'; Getsadze 59'; Mikaberidze 73'	Report	Deliallisi 65'

Mikheil Meskhi Stadium, Tbilisi (Note: Metalurgi Rustavi played their home match at Mikheil Meskhi Stadium, Tbilisi instead of their regular stadium, Poladi Stadium, Rustavi.)
Attendance: 1,000
Referee: Vladimir Vnuk (Slovakia)

Metalurgi Rustavi won 9–1 on aggregate.

5 July 2012
20:00

Olimpija Ljubljana (Slovenia)	3–0	(Luxembourg) Jeunesse Esch
Ivelja 53'; Vicente 76', 90+3'	Report

Stožice Stadium, Ljubljana
Attendance: 2,000
Referee: Fariz Yusifov (Azerbaijan)
12 July 2012
18:00

Jeunesse Esch (Luxembourg)	0–3	(Slovenia) Olimpija Ljubljana
	Report	Bešić 25'; Sretenović 38'; Omladič 66'

Stade de la Frontière, Esch-sur-Alzette
Attendance: 920
Referee: Petur Reinert (Faroe Islands)

Olimpija Ljubljana won 6–0 on aggregate.

5 July 2012
20:00

EB/Streymur (Faroe Islands)	3–1	(Armenia) Gandzasar Kapan
Hanssenbirk 9' (pen.), 33' (pen.); Samuelsen 25'	Report	Correia 72'

Gundadalur, Tórshavn (Note: EB/Streymur played their home match at Gundadalur, Tórshavn instead of their regular stadium, Við Margáir, Streymnes.)
Attendance: 523
Referee: Ignasi Villamayor Rozados (Andorra)
12 July 2012
17:00

Gandzasar Kapan (Armenia)	2–0	(Faroe Islands) EB/Streymur
H. Avagyan 67'; Lomba 72'	Report

Republican Stadium, Yerevan (Note: Gandzasar Kapan played their home match at Republican Stadium, Yerevan instead of their regular stadium, Gandzasar Stadium, Kapan.)
Attendance: 2,000
Referee: Pavel Saliy (Kazakhstan)

3–3 on aggregate; Gandzasar Kapan won on away goals.

5 July 2012
20:45

St Patrick's Athletic (Republic of Ireland)	1–0	(Iceland) ÍBV
Fagan 39'	Report

Richmond Park, Dublin
Attendance: 1,652
Referee: Igor Satchi (Moldova)
12 July 2012
21:30

ÍBV (Iceland)	2–1 (a.e.t.)	(Republic of Ireland) St Patrick's Athletic
Garner 83'; Birgisson 98'	Report	O'Flynn 99'

Hásteinsvöllur, Vestmannaeyjar
Attendance: 866
Referee: Aleksandrs Anufrijevs (Latvia)

2–2 on aggregate; St Patrick's Athletic won on away goals.

5 July 2012
20:30

La Fiorita (San Marino)	0–2	(Latvia) Liepājas Metalurgs
	Report	Leliūga 40'; Soloņicins 90'

Stadio Olimpico, Serravalle
Attendance: 416
Referee: Laurent Kopriwa (Luxembourg)
12 July 2012
18:00

Liepājas Metalurgs (Latvia)	4–0	(San Marino) La Fiorita
Kamešs 1'; Afanasjevs 72'; Soloņicins 82' (pen.); Askerov 85'	Report

Daugava Stadium, Liepāja
Attendance: 1,200
Referee: Lasha Silagava (Georgia)

Liepājas Metalurgs won 6–0 on aggregate.

5 July 2012
18:00

JJK (Finland)	2–0	(Norway) Stabæk
Gruborovics 16'; Wusu 66'	Report

Harjun stadion, Jyväskylä
Attendance: 1,817
Referee: Radek Matějek (Czech Republic)
12 July 2012
19:00

Stabæk (Norway)	3–2	(Finland) JJK
Kleiven 37'; Stokkelien 45+2'; Haugsdal 64'	Report	van Gelderen 45'; Innanen 51'

Nadderud Stadion, Bærum
Attendance: 693
Referee: Elmir Pilav (Bosnia and Herzegovina)

JJK won 4–3 on aggregate.

5 July 2012
20:45

Bangor City (Wales)	0–0	(Moldova) Zimbru Chișinău
	Report

Nantporth, Bangor
Attendance: 1,022
Referee: Christos Nicolaides (Cyprus)
12 July 2012
18:30

Zimbru Chișinău (Moldova)	2–1	(Wales) Bangor City
Molla 29', 31'	Report	Smyth 44'

Zimbru Stadium, Chișinău
Attendance: 2,700
Referee: Ognjen Valjić (Bosnia and Herzegovina)

Zimbru Chișinău won 2–1 on aggregate.

3 July 2012
17:30

Shkëndija (North Macedonia)	0–0	(Northern Ireland) Portadown
	Report

Milano Arena, Kumanovo (Note: Shkëndija played their home match at Milano Arena, Kumanovo instead of their regular stadium, Gradski stadion, Tetovo.)
Attendance: 1,324
Referee: Eitan Shemeulevitch (Israel)
10 July 2012
20:45

Portadown (Northern Ireland)	2–1	(North Macedonia) Shkëndija
Lecky 58'; Redman 80'	Report	Cuculi 4'

Shamrock Park, Portadown
Attendance: 1,029
Referee: Michael Johansen (Denmark)

Portadown won 2–1 on aggregate.

== Second qualifying round ==
=== Summary ===
The draw for the second qualifying round was held on 25 June 2012, immediately after the first qualifying round draw. The first legs were played on 19 July, and the second legs were played on 26 July 2012.

Team 1	Agg.	Team 2	1st leg	2nd leg
Khazar Lankaran (Azerbaijan)	1–2	(Poland) Lech Poznań	1–1	0–1
Eskişehirspor (Turkey)	3–1	(Scotland) St Johnstone	2–0	1–1
Hajduk Split (Croatia)	2–1	(Latvia) Skonto	2–0	0–1
AIK (Sweden)	2–1	(Iceland) FH	1–1	1–0
Renova (North Macedonia)	1–2	(Belarus) Gomel	0–2	1–0
Naftan Novopolotsk (Belarus)	6–7	(Serbia) Red Star Belgrade	3–4	3–3
Vojvodina (Serbia)	5–1	(Lithuania) Sūduva	1–1	4–0
JJK (Finland)	3–3 (a)	(Montenegro) Zeta	3–2	0–1
Young Boys (Switzerland)	1–1 (4–1 p)	(Moldova) Zimbru Chișinău	1–0	0–1 (a.e.t.)
Lokomotiv Plovdiv (Bulgaria)	5–7	(Netherlands) Vitesse	4–4	1–3
Tirana (Albania)	1–6	(Norway) Aalesund	1–1	0–5
Metalurh Donetsk (Ukraine)	11–2	(Montenegro) Čelik Nikšić	7–0	4–2
Maccabi Netanya (Israel)	2–2 (a)	(Finland) KuPS	1–2	1–0
Mladá Boleslav (Czech Republic)	4–0	(Iceland) Þór	3–0	1–0
Levadia Tallinn (Estonia)	1–6	(Cyprus) Anorthosis Famagusta	1–3	0–3
Milsami Orhei (Moldova)	4–5	(Kazakhstan) Aktobe	4–2	0–3
Slaven Belupo (Croatia)	10–2	(Northern Ireland) Portadown	6–0	4–2
Servette (Switzerland)	5–1	(Armenia) Gandzasar Kapan	2–0	3–1
Twente (Netherlands)	6–1	(Finland) Inter Turku	1–1	5–0
Žalgiris (Lithuania)	2–6	(Austria) Admira Wacker Mödling	1–1	1–5
Osijek (Croatia)	1–6	(Sweden) Kalmar FF	1–3	0–3
Slovan Bratislava (Slovakia)	1–1 (a)	(Hungary) Videoton	1–1	0–0
Rapid București (Romania)	5–1	(Finland) MYPA	3–1	2–0
Metalurgi Rustavi (Georgia (country))	1–5 (Note: Order of legs reversed after original draw)	(Czech Republic) Viktoria Plzeň	1–3	0–2
Mura 05 (Slovenia)	1–1 (a)	(Bulgaria) CSKA Sofia	0–0	1–1
Inter Baku (Azerbaijan)	2–2 (2–4 p)	(Greece) Asteras Tripolis	1–1	1–1 (a.e.t.)
Differdange 03 (Luxembourg)	2–4	(Belgium) Gent	0–1	2–3
Anzhi Makhachkala (Russia)	5–0	(Hungary) Honvéd	1–0	4–0
Levski Sofia (Bulgaria)	2–3	(Bosnia and Herzegovina) Sarajevo	1–0	1–3
Liepājas Metalurgs (Latvia)	3–7	(Poland) Legia Warsaw	2–2	1–5
Shakhtyor Soligorsk (Belarus)	1–1 (a)	(Austria) Ried	1–1	0–0
Bnei Yehuda (Israel)	3–0	(Armenia) Shirak	2–0	1–0
Rosenborg (Norway)	4–3	(Kazakhstan) Ordabasy	2–2	2–1
Spartak Trnava (Slovakia)	4–2	(Republic of Ireland) Sligo Rovers	3–1	1–1
Dacia Chișinău (Moldova)	1–2	(Sweden) IF Elfsborg	1–0	0–2
Široki Brijeg (Bosnia and Herzegovina)	2–3	(Republic of Ireland) St Patrick's Athletic	1–1	1–2 (a.e.t.)
APOEL (Cyprus)	3–0	(Slovakia) Senica	2–0	1–0
Ruch Chorzów (Poland)	6–1	(North Macedonia) Metalurg Skopje	3–1	3–0
AGF (Denmark)	2–5	(Georgia (country)) Dila Gori	1–2	1–3
Olimpija Ljubljana (Slovenia)	0–1	(Norway) Tromsø	0–0	0–1 (a.e.t.)

=== Matches ===
19 July 2012
17:00

Khazar Lankaran (Azerbaijan)	1–1	(Poland) Lech Poznań
Subašić 4'	Report	Możdżeń 19'

City Stadium, Lankaran
Attendance: 12,000
Referee: Robert Schörgenhofer (Austria)
26 July 2012
20:00

Lech Poznań (Poland)	1–0	(Azerbaijan) Khazar Lankaran
Tonev 16'	Report

Stadion Miejski, Poznań
Attendance: 25,840
Referee: Stanislav Todorov (Bulgaria)

Lech Poznań won 2–1 on aggregate.

19 July 2012
19:00

Eskişehirspor (Turkey)	2–0	(Scotland) St Johnstone
Potuk 41'; Wright 65' (o.g.)	Report

Atatürk Stadium, Eskişehir
Attendance: 12,206
Referee: Ante Vučemilović-Šimunović Jr. (Croatia)
26 July 2012
20:45

St Johnstone (Scotland)	1–1	(Turkey) Eskişehirspor
Tadé 35'	Report	Sarı 52'

McDiarmid Park, Perth
Attendance: 6,023
Referee: Serge Gumienny (Belgium)

Eskişehirspor won 3–1 on aggregate.

19 July 2012
20:30

Hajduk Split (Croatia)	2–0	(Latvia) Skonto
Vukušić 34'; Trebotić 58'	Report

Stadion Poljud, Split
Attendance: 13,450
Referee: Anastassios Kakos (Greece)
26 July 2012
20:30

Skonto (Latvia)	1–0	(Croatia) Hajduk Split
Siņeļņikovs 90+3'	Report

Skonto Stadium, Riga
Attendance: 3,100
Referee: Libor Kovařík (Czech Republic)

Hajduk Split won 2–1 on aggregate.

19 July 2012
19:00

AIK (Sweden)	1–1	(Iceland) FH
Lundberg 56'	Report	Guðnason 40'

Råsunda Stadium, Solna
Attendance: 5,840
Referee: Wim Smet (Belgium)
26 July 2012
21:15

FH (Iceland)	0–1	(Sweden) AIK
	Report	Lorentzson 40'

Kaplakriki, Hafnarfjörður
Attendance: 2,198
Referee: Simon Lee Evans (Wales)

AIK won 2–1 on aggregate.

19 July 2012
17:30

Renova (North Macedonia)	0–2	(Belarus) Gomel
	Report	Dzemidovich 20'; Nowak 39'

Milano Arena, Kumanovo
Attendance: 648
Referee: Hubert Siejewicz (Poland)
26 July 2012
18:00

Gomel (Belarus)	0–1	(North Macedonia) Renova
	Report	Asani 56'

Central Stadium, Gomel
Attendance: 10,250
Referee: Jérôme Efong Nzolo (Belgium)

Gomel won 2–1 on aggregate.

19 July 2012
17:00

Naftan Novopolotsk (Belarus)	3–4	(Serbia) Red Star Belgrade
Hawrushka 47' (pen.), 67'; Zhukowski 76'	Report	Kasalica 9', 69'; Milunović 18', 34'

Central Sport Complex, Vitebsk (Note: Naftan Novopolotsk played their home match at Central Sport Complex, Vitebsk instead of their regular stadium, Atlant Stadium, Navapolatsk.)
Attendance: 5,350
Referee: Tony Asumaa (Finland)
26 July 2012
20:30

Red Star Belgrade (Serbia)	3–3	(Belarus) Naftan Novopolotsk
Kasalica 9'; Dimitrijević 15'; Vešović 90+1'	Report	Sorokin 21'; Naumov 58'; Kovalenko 82'

Stadion FK Crvena Zvezda, Belgrade
Attendance: 27,628
Referee: Saïd Ennjimi (France)

Red Star Belgrade won 7–6 on aggregate.

19 July 2012
20:30

Vojvodina (Serbia)	1–1	(Lithuania) Sūduva
Oumarou 90+3'	Report	Beniušis 56'

Karađorđe Stadium, Novi Sad
Attendance: 6,103
Referee: Bobby Madden (Scotland)
26 July 2012
18:30

Sūduva (Lithuania)	0–4	(Serbia) Vojvodina
	Report	Moreira 4'; Škuletić 37'; Stevanović 40'; Oumarou 48'

Sūduva Stadium, Marijampolė
Attendance: 2,000
Referee: Oliver Drachta (Austria)

Vojvodina won 5–1 on aggregate.

19 July 2012
18:00

JJK (Finland)	3–2	(Montenegro) Zeta
Gruborovics 27' (pen.), 43', 47'	Report	Došljak 17'; M. B. Radulović 38'

Harjun stadion, Jyväskylä
Attendance: 1,873
Referee: Neil Doyle (Republic of Ireland)
26 July 2012
20:00

Zeta (Montenegro)	1–0	(Finland) JJK
Došljak 82'	Report

Stadion Pod Goricom, Podgorica
Attendance: 3,000
Referee: Matej Jug (Slovenia)

3–3 on aggregate; Zeta won on away goals.

19 July 2012
19:30

Young Boys (Switzerland)	1–0	(Moldova) Zimbru Chișinău
Frey 53'	Report

Stade de Suisse, Bern
Attendance: 9,117
Referee: Miroslav Zelinka (Czech Republic)
26 July 2012
19:15

Zimbru Chișinău (Moldova)	1–0 (a.e.t.)	(Switzerland) Young Boys
Barakhoyev 42'	Report
Penalties
Derkach (penalty scored); Molla (penalty missed); Catan (penalty missed)	1–4	(penalty scored) Spycher; (penalty scored) Mayuka; (penalty scored) Nef; (penalty scored) Costanzo

Zimbru Stadium, Chișinău
Attendance: 5,998
Referee: Kevin Blom (Netherlands)

1–1 on aggregate; Young Boys won 4–1 on penalties.

19 July 2012
17:30

Lokomotiv Plovdiv (Bulgaria)	4–4	(Netherlands) Vitesse
Y. Todorov 24'; Lazarov 49', 64'; Tássio 90+2'	Report	Reis 23'; van Ginkel 31', 77'; Bony 53'

Lovech Stadium, Lovech (Note: Lokomotiv Plovdiv played their home match at Lovech Stadium, Lovech instead of their regular stadium, Lokomotiv Stadium, Plovdiv.)
Attendance: 2,105
Referee: Antonio Mateu Lahoz (Spain)
26 July 2012
20:00

Vitesse (Netherlands)	3–1	(Bulgaria) Lokomotiv Plovdiv
Van Ginkel 25'; Van Aanholt 45+2'; Bony 48'	Report	Zlatinski 80' (pen.)

GelreDome, Arnhem
Attendance: 13,469
Referee: Michael Koukoulakis (Greece)

Vitesse won 7–5 on aggregate.

19 July 2012
19:00

Tirana (Albania)	1–1	(Norway) Aalesund
Çota 38'	Report	Stewart 57'

Qemal Stafa Stadium, Tirana
Attendance: 2,300
Referee: Aleksei Kulbakov (Belarus)
26 July 2012
19:00

Aalesund (Norway)	5–0	(Albania) Tirana
Barrantes 45+1'; Tollås 48'; James 64', 77'; Stewart 83'	Report

Color Line Stadion, Ålesund
Attendance: 4,225
Referee: Arnold Hunter (Northern Ireland)

Aalesund won 6–1 on aggregate.

19 July 2012
19:00

Metalurh Donetsk (Ukraine)	7–0	(Montenegro) Čelik Nikšić
Makrides 17', 49'; G. Ghazaryan 36', 61', 86'; Danilo 51'; Júnior Moraes 78'	Report

Metalurh Stadium, Donetsk
Attendance: 3,200
Referee: Jakob Kehlet (Denmark)
26 July 2012
17:30

Čelik Nikšić (Montenegro)	2–4	(Ukraine) Metalurh Donetsk
Jovović 23'; Zorić 50' (pen.)	Report	Danilo 15'; Junior Moraes 53'; Volovyk 72'; Zé Soares 84'

Gradski stadion, Nikšić
Attendance: 1,480
Referee: Eli Hacmon (Israel)

Metalurh Donetsk won 11–2 on aggregate.

19 July 2012
20:00

Maccabi Netanya (Israel)	1–2	(Finland) KuPS
Shivhon 75'	Report	Paananen 36', 45'

HaMoshava Stadium, Petah Tikva (Note: Maccabi Netanya played their home match at HaMoshava Stadium, Petah Tikva instead of their regular stadium, Sar-Tov Stadium, Netanya.)
Attendance: 4,000
Referee: Sergei Karasev (Russia)
26 July 2012
17:30

KuPS (Finland)	0–1	(Israel) Maccabi Netanya
	Report	Saba'a 40'

Savon Sanomat Areena, Kuopio
Attendance: 3,018
Referee: Marios Panayi (Cyprus)

2–2 on aggregate; KuPS won on away goals.

19 July 2012
19:00

Mladá Boleslav (Czech Republic)	3–0	(Iceland) Þór
Magera 33', 43'; Šćuk 80'	Report

Městský Stadium, Mladá Boleslav
Attendance: 3,867
Referee: Marco Borg (Malta)
26 July 2012
21:15

Þór (Iceland)	0–1	(Czech Republic) Mladá Boleslav
	Report	Magera 31'

Þórsvöllur, Akureyri
Attendance: 798
Referee: Gediminas Mažeika (Lithuania)

Mladá Boleslav won 4–0 on aggregate.

19 July 2012
17:45

Levadia Tallinn (Estonia)	1–3	(Cyprus) Anorthosis Famagusta
Morozov 82'	Report	Spadacio 45' (pen.); Laborde 55'; Toni Calvo 62'

Kadrioru Stadium, Tallinn
Attendance: 2,550
Referee: Marco Fritz (Germany)
26 July 2012
19:00

Anorthosis Famagusta (Cyprus)	3–0	(Estonia) Levadia Tallinn
Calvo 13'; Okkas 41'; Laborde 62'	Report

Antonis Papadopoulos Stadium, Larnaca
Attendance: 6,892
Referee: Yevhen Aranovskiy (Ukraine)

Anorthosis Famagusta won 6–1 on aggregate.

19 July 2012
17:00

Milsami Orhei (Moldova)	4–2	(Kazakhstan) Aktobe
Boghiu 16', 51'; Wellington 33'; Gheti 87'	Report	Kapadze 8'; Smakov 56'

Complexul Sportiv Raional, Orhei
Attendance: 3,023
Referee: Lorenc Jemini (Albania)
26 July 2012
18:00

Aktobe (Kazakhstan)	3–0	(Moldova) Milsami Orhei
Khairullin 39'; Geynrikh 50'; Simão 90+3' (o.g.)	Report

Central Stadium, Aktobe
Attendance: 11,300
Referee: Alexander Kostadinov (Bulgaria)

Aktobe won 5–4 on aggregate.

19 July 2012
19:00

Slaven Belupo (Croatia)	6–0	(Northern Ireland) Portadown
Breen 1' (o.g.); Bušić 13', 33'; Rak 56', 71', 80'	Report

Gradski stadion, Koprivnica
Attendance: 1,300
Referee: Paolo Silvio Mazzoleni (Italy)
26 July 2012
20:45

Portadown (Northern Ireland)	2–4	(Croatia) Slaven Belupo
Lecky 45+2'; McCafferty 67' (pen.)	Report	Bubnjić 10'; Brlek 14'; Šaban 62', 64'

Shamrock Park, Portadown
Attendance: 393
Referee: Ján Valášek (Slovakia)

Slaven Belupo won 10–2 on aggregate.

19 July 2012
19:45

Servette (Switzerland)	2–0	(Armenia) Gandzasar Kapan
Karanović 48'; Gissi 79'	Report

Stade de Genève, Geneva
Attendance: 5,830
Referee: Damir Batinić (Croatia)
26 July 2012
17:00

Gandzasar Kapan (Armenia)	1–3	(Switzerland) Servette
H. Avagyan 90+1'	Report	De Azevedo 47'; Pont 64', 68'

Republican Stadium, Yerevan
Attendance: 1,500
Referee: Eiko Saar (Estonia)

Servette won 5–1 on aggregate.

19 July 2012
19:45

Twente (Netherlands)	1–1	(Finland) Inter Turku
Tadić 66'	Report	Bouwman 38'

De Grolsch Veste, Enschede
Attendance: 18,100
Referee: Cyril Zimmermann (Switzerland)
26 July 2012
18:00

Inter Turku (Finland)	0–5	(Netherlands) Twente
	Report	Fer 4', 37'; Plet 7'; Chadli 77', 89'

Veritas Stadion, Turku
Attendance: 7,610
Referee: Ivan Bebek (Croatia)

Twente won 6–1 on aggregate.

19 July 2012
19:30

Žalgiris (Lithuania)	1–1	(Austria) Admira Wacker Mödling
Radavičius 72'	Report	Hosiner 12'

LFF Stadium, Vilnius
Attendance: 2,473
Referee: Mark Courtney (Northern Ireland)
26 July 2012
21:05

Admira Wacker Mödling (Austria)	5–1	(Lithuania) Žalgiris
Schwab 4'; Ježek 14' (pen.), 52'; Ouédraogo 31'; Hosiner 70'	Report	Kuklys 22'

Bundesstadion Südstadt, Maria Enzersdorf
Attendance: 3,980
Referee: Leontios Trattou (Cyprus)

Admira Wacker Mödling won 6–2 on aggregate.

19 July 2012
20:00

Osijek (Croatia)	1–3	(Sweden) Kalmar FF
Miličević 5'	Report	Mendes 34'; Dauda 66'; Gutu 68'

Stadion Gradski vrt, Osijek
Attendance: 1,800
Referee: Kristinn Jakobsson (Iceland)
26 July 2012
19:00

Kalmar FF (Sweden)	3–0	(Croatia) Osijek
Dauda 25'; Ibriks 45+1' (o.g.); Nouri 90+3'	Report

Guldfågeln Arena, Kalmar
Attendance: 4,653
Referee: Menashe Masiah (Israel)

Kalmar FF won 6–1 on aggregate.

19 July 2012
20:15

Slovan Bratislava (Slovakia)	1–1	(Hungary) Videoton
Šebo 26'	Report	Filipe Oliveira 30'

Štadión Pasienky, Bratislava
Attendance: 6,248
Referee: Aleksei Nikolaev (Russia)
26 July 2012
20:30

Videoton (Hungary)	0–0	(Slovakia) Slovan Bratislava
	Report

Sóstói Stadion, Székesfehérvár
Attendance: 8,028
Referee: Antony Gautier (France)

1–1 on aggregate; Videoton won on away goals.

19 July 2012
19:30

Rapid București (Romania)	3–1	(Finland) MYPA
Filipe Teixeira 8'; Grigore 40'; Pancu 45'	Report	Williams 26'

Stadionul Giulești-Valentin Stănescu, Bucharest
Attendance: 4,684
Referee: Stavros Tritsonis (Greece)
26 July 2012
18:30

MYPA (Finland)	0–2	(Romania) Rapid București
	Report	Surdu 19'; Ilioski 42'

Saviniemi, Kouvola
Attendance: 1,282
Referee: Dimitar Meckarovski (Macedonia)

Rapid București won 5–1 on aggregate.

19 July 2012
18:00

Metalurgi Rustavi (Georgia (country))	1–3	(Czech Republic) Viktoria Plzeň
Tatanashvilli 29'	Report	Horváth 14', 59'; Kolář 32'

Mikheil Meskhi Stadium, Tbilisi
Attendance: 2,995
Referee: Emir Alecković (Bosnia and Herzegovina)
26 July 2012
20:00

Viktoria Plzeň (Czech Republic)	2–0	(Georgia (country)) Metalurgi Rustavi
Ďuriš 7'; Darida 10'	Report

Stadion města Plzně, Plzeň
Attendance: 11,446
Referee: Espen Berntsen (Norway)

Viktoria Plzeň won 5–1 on aggregate.

19 July 2012
20:00

Mura 05 (Slovenia)	0–0	(Bulgaria) CSKA Sofia
	Report

Športni park, Lendava (Note: Mura 05 played their home match at Športni park, Lendava instead of their regular stadium, Fazanerija City Stadium, Murska Sobota.)
Attendance: 2,200
Referee: Lee Probert (England)
26 July 2012
19:00

CSKA Sofia (Bulgaria)	1–1	(Slovenia) Mura 05
Popov 18'	Report	Fajić 76'

Vasil Levski National Stadium, Sofia (Note: CSKA Sofia played their home match at Vasil Levski National Stadium, Sofia instead of their regular stadium, Balgarska Armia Stadium, Sofia, as it was undergoing renovation work.)
Attendance: 5,800
Referee: Hannes Kaasik (Estonia)

1–1 on aggregate; Mura 05 won on away goals.

19 July 2012
18:00

Inter Baku (Azerbaijan)	1–1	(Greece) Asteras Tripolis
Schutz 46'	Report	Usero 54'

Dalga Arena, Baku
Attendance: 2,000
Referee: Mihaly Fabian (Hungary)
26 July 2012
19:00

Asteras Tripolis (Greece)	1–1 (a.e.t.)	(Azerbaijan) Inter Baku
X. Navarro 68'	Report	Schutz 88'
Penalties
Tsabouris (penalty missed); Rayo (penalty scored); Usero (penalty scored); Juanito (penalty scored); Perrone (penalty scored)	4–2	(penalty missed) Georgievski; (penalty scored) Tskhadadze; (penalty missed) Barmettler; (penalty scored) Genov

Asteras Tripolis Stadium, Tripoli
Attendance: 2,661
Referee: Lars Christoffersen (Denmark)

2–2 on aggregate; Asteras Tripolis won 4–2 on penalties.

19 July 2012
18:30

Differdange 03 (Luxembourg)	0–1	(Belgium) Gent
	Report	Arzo 27'

Stade de la Frontière, Esch-sur-Alzette
Attendance: 1,195
Referee: Mark Steven Whitby (Wales)
26 July 2012
19:30

Gent (Belgium)	3–2	(Luxembourg) Differdange 03
Melli 41'; Conté 63'; Kola 73'	Report	Er Rafik 24'; Bettmer 37'

Jules Ottenstadion, Ghent
Attendance: 6,504
Referee: Vadims Direktorenko (Latvia)

Gent won 4–2 on aggregate.

19 July 2012
17:00

Anzhi Makhachkala (Russia)	1–0	(Hungary) Honvéd
Jucilei 22'	Report

Saturn Stadium, Ramenskoye (Note: Anzhi Makhachkala played their home match at Saturn Stadium, Ramenskoye instead of their regular stadium, Dynamo Stadium, Makhachkala, due to security issues involving the city of Makhachkala and the autonomous republic of Dagestan.)
Attendance: 5,000
Referee: Alon Yefet (Israel)
26 July 2012
18:30

Honvéd (Hungary)	0–4	(Russia) Anzhi Makhachkala
	Report	Eto'o 7', 81'; Traoré 53'; Shatov 68'

Bozsik Stadion, Budapest
Attendance: 5,100
Referee: Luca Banti (Italy)

Anzhi Makhachkala won 5–0 on aggregate.

19 July 2012
19:00

Levski Sofia (Bulgaria)	1–0	(Bosnia and Herzegovina) Sarajevo
Raykov 72'	Report

Georgi Asparuhov Stadium, Sofia
Attendance: 12,552
Referee: Bruno Paixão (Portugal)
26 July 2012
21:00

Sarajevo (Bosnia and Herzegovina)	3–1	(Bulgaria) Levski Sofia
Husejinović 12', 62'; Suljić 14'	Report	de Carvalho 34' (pen.)

Asim Ferhatović Hase Stadium, Sarajevo
Attendance: 11,122
Referee: Cristian Balaj (Romania)

Sarajevo won 3–2 on aggregate.

19 July 2012
17:00

Liepājas Metalurgs (Latvia)	2–2	(Poland) Legia Warsaw
Leliūga 43'; Kļava 81' (pen.)	Report	Kucharczyk 20'; Kosecki 47'

Daugava Stadium, Liepāja
Attendance: 3,106
Referee: Antti Munukka (Finland)
26 July 2012
20:30

Legia Warsaw (Poland)	5–1	(Latvia) Liepājas Metalurgs
Saganowski 4', 39', 79'; Gol 57'; Żyro 61'	Report	Kamešs 45+1'

Pepsi Arena, Warsaw
Attendance: 12,300
Referee: João Capela (Portugal)

Legia Warsaw won 7–3 on aggregate.

19 July 2012
18:30

Shakhtyor Soligorsk (Belarus)	1–1	(Austria) Ried
Asipenka 44'	Report	Hadžić 70' (pen.)

Stroitel Stadium, Salihorsk
Attendance: 3,370
Referee: Ovidiu Alin Hategan (Romania)
26 July 2012
19:00

Ried (Austria)	0–0	(Belarus) Shakhtyor Soligorsk
	Report

Keine Sorgen Arena, Ried im Innkreis
Attendance: 4,100
Referee: Michael Lerjéus (Sweden)

1–1 on aggregate; Ried won on away goals.

19 July 2012
19:00

Bnei Yehuda (Israel)	2–0	(Armenia) Shirak
Ndlovu 82'; Galván 90+4'	Report

Ramat Gan Stadium, Ramat Gan (Note: Bnei Yehuda played their home match at Ramat Gan Stadium in Tel Aviv District instead of their regular stadium, Bloomfield Stadium, Tel Aviv.)
Attendance: 1,890
Referee: Richard Liesveld (Netherlands)
26 July 2012
15:30

Shirak (Armenia)	0–1	(Israel) Bnei Yehuda
	Report	Menashe 31'

City Stadium, Gyumri
Attendance: 2,500
Referee: Ilias Spathas (Greece)

Bnei Yehuda won 3–0 on aggregate.

19 July 2012
19:00

Rosenborg (Norway)	2–2	(Kazakhstan) Ordabasy
Dočkal 33', 45+2' (pen.)	Report	Pakholiuk 75'; Mansour 90+3'

Lerkendal Stadion, Trondheim
Attendance: 3,709
Referee: Ruddy Buquet (France)
26 July 2012
16:00

Ordabasy (Kazakhstan)	1–2	(Norway) Rosenborg
Mansour 32'	Report	Fredheim Holm 67'; Dočkal 90+4'

Central Stadium, Almaty
Attendance: 22,000
Referee: Rene Eisner (Austria)

Rosenborg won 4–3 on aggregate.

19 July 2012
19:00

Spartak Trnava (Slovakia)	3–1	(Republic of Ireland) Sligo Rovers
Karhan 38'; Mikovič 45', 45+1'	Report	Peers 68'

Štadión Antona Malatinského, Trnava
Attendance: 6,832
Referee: Tommy Skjerven (Norway)
26 July 2012
20:00

Sligo Rovers (Republic of Ireland)	1–1	(Slovakia) Spartak Trnava
McGuinness 90+2'	Report	Čvirik 70'

Showgrounds, Sligo
Attendance: 3,754
Referee: Maksim Layushkin (Russia)

Spartak Trnava won 4–2 on aggregate.

19 July 2012
19:15

Dacia Chișinău (Moldova)	1–0	(Sweden) IF Elfsborg
Mihaliov 32'	Report

Zimbru Stadium, Chișinău
Attendance: 5,400
Referee: Carlos Xistra (Portugal)
26 July 2012
18:00

IF Elfsborg (Sweden)	2–0	(Moldova) Dacia Chișinău
Nilsson 9', 40'	Report

Borås Arena, Borås
Attendance: 3,181
Referee: Andrea De Marco (Italy)

IF Elfsborg won 2–1 on aggregate.

19 July 2012
21:00

Široki Brijeg (Bosnia and Herzegovina)	1–1	(Republic of Ireland) St Patrick's Athletic
Wagner 90+3'	Report	Fagan 12'

Stadion Pecara, Široki Brijeg
Attendance: 3,200
Referee: István Kovács (Romania)
26 July 2012
20:45

St Patrick's Athletic (Republic of Ireland)	2–1 (a.e.t.)	(Bosnia and Herzegovina) Široki Brijeg
Russell 39'; Fagan 105'	Report	I. Džidić 65'

Richmond Park, Dublin
Attendance: 1,805
Referee: Deniz Aytekin (Germany)

Sarajevo won 3–2 on aggregate.

19 July 2012
19:00

APOEL (Cyprus)	2–0	(Slovakia) Senica
Aílton 33'; Alexandrou 40'	Report

GSP Stadium, Nicosia
Attendance: 16,323
Referee: Pawel Gil (Poland)
26 July 2012
19:30

Senica (Slovakia)	0–1	(Cyprus) APOEL
	Report	Hélio Pinto 73'

Štadión FK Senica, Senica
Attendance: 3,069
Referee: Alexandru Tudor (Romania)

APOEL won 3–0 on aggregate.

19 July 2012
19:00

Ruch Chorzów (Poland)	3–1	(North Macedonia) Metalurg Skopje
Piech 74', 83'; Stawarczyk 90+1'	Report	Memedi 69'

Stadion Ruchu, Chorzów (Note: Stadion Ruchu capacity was limited to 4,000 because of renovation works.)
Attendance: 4,000
Referee: Hüseyin Göçek (Turkey)
26 July 2012
17:00

Metalurg Skopje (North Macedonia)	0–3	(Poland) Ruch Chorzów
	Report	Janoszka 9'; Straka 15'; Piech 63'

Milano Arena, Kumanovo
Attendance: 750
Referee: Richard Trutz (Slovakia)

Ruch Chorzów won 6–1 on aggregate.

19 July 2012
19:00

AGF (Denmark)	1–2	(Georgia (country)) Dila Gori
Kure 3'	Report	Vatsadze 34'; Aladashvili 84'

NRGi Park, Aarhus
Attendance: 9,030
Referee: Boško Jovanetić (Serbia)
26 July 2012
16:00

Dila Gori (Georgia (country))	3–1	(Denmark) AGF
Vatsadze 62', 83'; Shashiashvili 74'	Report	Skender 34' (o.g.)

Mikheil Meskhi Stadium, Tbilisi (Note: Dila Gori played their home match at Mikheil Meskhi Stadium, Tbilisi instead of their regular stadium, Tengiz Burjanadze Stadium, Gori.)
Attendance: 5,800
Referee: Stephan Studer (Switzerland)

Dila Gori won 5–2 on aggregate.

19 July 2012
18:00

Olimpija Ljubljana (Slovenia)	0–0	(Norway) Tromsø
	Report

Stožice Stadium, Ljubljana
Attendance: 2,600
Referee: Fernando Teixeira Vitienes (Spain)
26 July 2012
19:00

Tromsø (Norway)	1–0 (a.e.t.)	(Slovenia) Olimpija Ljubljana
Koppinen 108'	Report

Alfheim Stadion, Tromsø
Attendance: 2,297
Referee: Robert Małek (Poland)

Tromsø won 1–0 on aggregate.
