= Olajide Williams =

Nigerian footballer

Personal information
- Full name: Ahmed Olajide Williams
- Date of birth: July 20, 1988 (age 38)
- Place of birth: Nigeria
- Height: 1.88 m (6 ft 2 in)
- Position: Forward

Team information
- Current team: Southern Myanmar
- Number: 28

Senior career*
Years	Team	Apps	(Gls)
2008	FC OPA	10	(3)
2009	Thanh Hóa	21	(7)
2010–11	KuPS	44	(10)
2012–2013	MYPA	52	(21)
2014	FC Mika	7	(0)
2014–2015	Abha	18	(15)
2016–2017	Al-Faisaly	19	(15)
2018–	Southern Myanmar	3	(1)
- * Club domestic league appearances and goals as of 7 May 2018

Olajide Williams (born 20 July 1988) is a Nigerian footballer currently playing for Myanmar National League club Southern Myanmar FC.
