= 2012–13 UEFA Europa League qualifying (third and play-off round matches) =

European football competition

This page summarises the matches of the third qualifying and play-off rounds of 2012–13 UEFA Europa League qualifying.

Times are CEST (UTC+2), as listed by UEFA (local times, if different, are in parentheses).

== Third qualifying round ==
=== Summary ===
The draw for the third qualifying rounds was held on 20 July 2012. The first legs were played on 2 August, and the second legs were played on 9 August 2012.

Team 1	Agg.	Team 2	1st leg	2nd leg
Videoton (Hungary)	4–0	(Belgium) Gent	1–0	3–0
AIK (Sweden)	3–1	(Poland) Lech Poznań	3–0	0–1
Eskişehirspor (Turkey)	1–4	(France) Marseille	1–1	0–3
Red Star Belgrade (Serbia)	0–0 (6–5 p)	(Cyprus) Omonia	0–0	0–0 (a.e.t.)
Sarajevo (Bosnia and Herzegovina)	2–2 (a)	(Montenegro) Zeta	2–1	0–1
Admira Wacker Mödling (Austria)	2–4	(Czech Republic) Sparta Prague	0–2	2–2
Kalmar FF (Sweden)	1–3	(Switzerland) Young Boys	1–0	0–3
Dundee United (Scotland)	2–7	(Russia) Dynamo Moscow	2–2	0–5
Arsenal Kyiv (Ukraine)	2–3	(Slovenia) Mura 05	0–3 (Note: UEFA awarded Mura 05 a 3–0 win due to Arsenal Kyiv fielding suspended player Éric Matoukou in the first leg. The original match had ended in a 3–0 win for Arsenal Kyiv.)	2–0
KuPS (Finland)	1–6 (Note: Order of legs reversed after original draw.)	(Turkey) Bursaspor	1–0	0–6
Steaua București (Romania)	3–1	(Slovakia) Spartak Trnava	0–1	3–0
Gomel (Belarus)	0–4	(England) Liverpool	0–1	0–3
Ried (Austria)	3–4	(Poland) Legia Warsaw	2–1	1–3
St Patrick's Athletic (Republic of Ireland)	0–5	(Germany) Hannover 96	0–3	0–2
Servette (Switzerland)	1–1 (a)	(Norway) Rosenborg	1–1	0–0
Athletic Bilbao (Spain)	4–3	(Croatia) Slaven Belupo	3–1	1–2
Anzhi Makhachkala (Russia)	4–0	(Netherlands) Vitesse	2–0	2–0
Asteras Tripolis (Greece)	1–1 (a)	(Portugal) Marítimo	1–1	0–0
Heerenveen (Netherlands)	4–1	(Romania) Rapid București	4–0	0–1
Ruch Chorzów (Poland)	0–7	(Czech Republic) Viktoria Plzeň	0–2	0–5
Horsens (Denmark)	4–3	(Sweden) IF Elfsborg	1–1	3–2
APOEL (Cyprus)	3–1	(Norway) Aalesund	2–1	1–0
Hajduk Split (Croatia)	2–3	(Italy) Internazionale	0–3	2–0
Vojvodina (Serbia)	2–3	(Austria) Rapid Wien	2–1	0–2
Genk (Belgium)	4–2	(Kazakhstan) Aktobe	2–1	2–1
Tromsø (Norway)	2–1	(Ukraine) Metalurh Donetsk	1–1	1–0
Twente (Netherlands)	4–0	(Czech Republic) Mladá Boleslav	2–0	2–0
Bnei Yehuda (Israel)	1–6	(Greece) PAOK	0–2	1–4
Dila Gori (Georgia (country))	3–1	(Cyprus) Anorthosis Famagusta	0–1	3–0 (Note: The match was abandoned in the 82nd minute due to crowd disturbance. Dila Gori was leading 3–0. That result was confirmed standing by UEFA.)

=== Matches ===
2 August 2012
20:30

Videoton (Hungary)	1–0	(Belgium) Gent
Nikolić 78'	Report

Sóstói Stadion, Székesfehérvár
Attendance: 5,900
Referee: Paolo Silvio Mazzoleni (Italy)
9 August 2012
19:30

Gent (Belgium)	0–3	(Hungary) Videoton
	Report	Oliveira 13'; Nikolić 68', 71'

Jules Ottenstadion, Ghent
Attendance: 5,828
Referee: Szymon Marciniak (Poland)

Videoton won 4–0 on aggregate.

2 August 2012
19:00

AIK (Sweden)	3–0	(Poland) Lech Poznań
Lorentzson 60'; Borges 78'; Lundberg 86'	Report

Råsunda Stadium, Solna
Attendance: 10,658
Referee: Marco Fritz (Germany)
9 August 2012
20:00

Lech Poznań (Poland)	1–0	(Sweden) AIK
Możdżeń 72'	Report

Stadion Miejski, Poznań
Attendance: 14,750
Referee: Libor Kovařik (Czech Republic)

AIK won 3–1 on aggregate.

2 August 2012
20:45

Eskişehirspor (Turkey)	1–1	(France) Marseille
Nuhiu 62'	Report	Gignac 49'

Atatürk Stadium, Eskişehir
Attendance: 12,870
Referee: Pawel Gil (Poland)
9 August 2012
20:45

Marseille (France)	3–0	(Turkey) Eskişehirspor
A. Ayew 7', 66'; Gignac 36'	Report

Stade Parsemain, Istres (Note: Marseille played their home match at Stade Parsemain, Istres instead of their regular stadium, Stade Vélodrome, Marseille, as it was under renovations.)
Attendance: 5,432
Referee: Artur Soares (Portugal)

Marseille won 4–1 on aggregate.

2 August 2012
20:30

Red Star Belgrade (Serbia)	0–0	(Cyprus) Omonia
	Report

Stadion FK Crvena Zvezda, Belgrade
Attendance: 26,930
Referee: Rene Eisner (Austria)
9 August 2012
18:00

Omonia (Cyprus)	0–0 (a.e.t.)	(Serbia) Red Star Belgrade
	Report
Penalties
Andre Alves (penalty scored); Freddy (penalty scored); Pavićević (penalty missed); Christofi (penalty scored); Aguiar (penalty scored); Scaramozzino (penalty scored); Danielson (penalty missed)	5–6	(penalty scored) Dimitrijević; (penalty scored) Milivojević; (penalty missed) Kasalica; (penalty scored) Maksimović; (penalty scored) Milunović; (penalty scored) Mladenović; (penalty scored) Mijailović

GSP Stadium, Nicosia
Attendance: 13,312
Referee: Michael Lerjéus (Sweden)

0–0 on aggregate; Red Star Belgrade won 6–5 on penalties.

2 August 2012
21:00

Sarajevo (Bosnia and Herzegovina)	2–1	(Montenegro) Zeta
Suljić 17'; Belošević 43'	Report	Božović 45'

Asim Ferhatović Hase Stadium, Sarajevo
Attendance: 12,259
Referee: Anastassios Kakos (Greece)
9 August 2012
20:00

Zeta (Montenegro)	1–0	(Bosnia and Herzegovina) Sarajevo
Burzanović 9'	Report

Stadion pod Goricom, Podgorica (Note: Zeta played their home match at Stadion Pod Goricom, Podgorica instead of their regular stadium, Stadion Trešnjica, Golubovci.)
Attendance: 5,879
Referee: Tommy Skjerven (Norway)

2–2 on aggregate; Zeta won on away goals.

2 August 2012
21:05

Admira Wacker Mödling (Austria)	0–2	(Czech Republic) Sparta Prague
	Report	Mevoungou 29' (o.g.); Kweuke 58'

Bundesstadion Südstadt, Maria Enzersdorf
Attendance: 5,000
Referee: Martin Hansson (Sweden)
9 August 2012
20:00

Sparta Prague (Czech Republic)	2–2	(Austria) Admira Wacker Mödling
Kweuke 36', 39'	Report	Thürauer 19'; Sulimani 69'

Generali Arena, Prague
Attendance: 8,732
Referee: Luca Banti (Italy)

Sparta Prague won 4–2 on aggregate.

2 August 2012
19:00

Kalmar FF (Sweden)	1–0	(Switzerland) Young Boys
Andersson 18'	Report

Guldfageln Arena, Kalmar
Attendance: 3,681
Referee: Fernando Teixeira Vitienes (Spain)
9 August 2012
19:30

Young Boys (Switzerland)	3–0	(Sweden) Kalmar FF
Mayuka 7'; Raimondi 69'; Bobadilla 82'	Report

Stade de Suisse, Bern
Attendance: 10,124
Referee: Halis Özkahya (Turkey)

Young Boys won 3–1 on aggregate.

2 August 2012
20:45

Dundee United (Scotland)	2–2	(Russia) Dynamo Moscow
Flood 37'; Watson 76'	Report	Semshov 50'; Kokorin 90+3'

Tannadice Park, Dundee
Attendance: 9,977
Referee: Marius Avram (Romania)
9 August 2012
18:00

Dynamo Moscow (Russia)	5–0	(Scotland) Dundee United
Semshov 2'; Kokorin 23'; Yusupov 40'; Sapeta 83', 89'	Report

Arena Khimki, Khimki
Attendance: 9,063
Referee: Stefan Johannesson (Sweden)

Dynamo Moscow won 7–2 on aggregate.

2 August 2012
18:00

Arsenal Kyiv (Ukraine)	0–3 Awarded (Note: UEFA awarded Mura 05 a 3–0 win due to Arsenal Kyiv fielding suspended player Éric Matoukou in the first leg. The original match had ended in a 3–0 win for Arsenal Kyiv.)	(Slovenia) Mura 05
Mazilu 6'; Kovpak 61'; Matoukou 83'	Report

Lobanovskyi Dynamo Stadium, Kyiv
Attendance: 3,200
Referee: Antti Munukka (Finland)
9 August 2012
20:00

Mura 05 (Slovenia)	0–2	(Ukraine) Arsenal Kyiv
	Report	Kobakhidze 2'; Homenyuk 61'

Ljudski vrt, Maribor (Note: Mura 05 played their home match at Ljudski vrt, Maribor instead of their regular stadium, Fazanerija City Stadium, Murska Sobota.)
Attendance: 3,200
Referee: Oliver Drachta (Austria)

Mura 05 won 3–2 on aggregate.

2 August 2012
17:30

KuPS (Finland)	1–0	(Turkey) Bursaspor
Puri 73'	Report

Savon Sanomat Areena, Kuopio
Attendance: 3,045
Referee: Sébastien Delferiere (France)
9 August 2012
20:30

Bursaspor (Turkey)	6–0	(Finland) KuPS
İbrahim Öztürk 23'; Pinto 28', 49'; Batalla 36'; N'Diaye 47'; Tufan 72'	Report

Bursa Atatürk Stadium, Bursa
Attendance: 19,092
Referee: Alexandru Dan Tudor (Romania)

Bursaspor won 6–1 on aggregate.

2 August 2012
19:45

Steaua București (Romania)	0–1	(Slovakia) Spartak Trnava
	Report	Mikovič 6'

Arena Națională, Bucharest
Attendance: 23,494
Referee: Kevin Blom (Netherlands)
9 August 2012
19:30

Spartak Trnava (Slovakia)	0–3	(Romania) Steaua București
	Report	Rocha 8'; Rusescu 77'; Nikolić 84'

Štadión Antona Malatinského, Trnava
Attendance: 13,789
Referee: Yevhen Aranovskiy (Ukraine)

Steaua București won 3–1 on aggregate.

2 August 2012
20:00

Gomel (Belarus)	0–1	(England) Liverpool
	Report	Downing 67'

Central Stadium, Gomel
Attendance: 13,800
Referee: Ivan Kružliak (Slovakia)
9 August 2012
21:05

Liverpool (England)	3–0	(Belarus) Gomel
Borini 21'; Gerrard 41'; Johnson 72'	Report

Anfield, Liverpool
Attendance: 43,256
Referee: Kenn Hansen (Denmark)

Liverpool won 4–0 on aggregate.

2 August 2012
19:00

Ried (Austria)	2–1	(Poland) Legia Warsaw
Gartler 52'; Hadžić 62' (pen.)	Report	Ljuboja 85'

Keine Sorgen Arena, Ried im Innkreis
Attendance: 4,200
Referee: Ante Vučemilović-Šimunović Jr. (Croatia)
9 August 2012
19:00

Legia Warsaw (Poland)	3–1	(Austria) Ried
Saganowski 41'; Radović 55'; Ljuboja 63'	Report	Žulj 76'

Pepsi Arena, Warsaw
Attendance: 15,322
Referee: Eli Hacmon (Israel)

Legia Warsaw won 4–3 on aggregate.

2 August 2012
20:45

St Patrick's Athletic (Republic of Ireland)	0–3	(Germany) Hannover 96
	Report	Andreasen 6'; Pander 67'; Ya Konan 80'

Tallaght Stadium, Tallaght (Note: St Patrick's Athletic played their home match at Tallaght Stadium, Tallaght, instead of their regular stadium, Richmond Park, Dublin.)
Attendance: 4,236
Referee: Tamás Bognár (Hungary)
9 August 2012
20:30

Hannover 96 (Germany)	2–0	(Republic of Ireland) St Patrick's Athletic
Haggui 32'; Eggimann 47'	Report

AWD-Arena, Hanover
Attendance: 24,500
Referee: Anar Salmanov (Azerbaijan)

Hannover 96 won 5–0 on aggregate.

2 August 2012
19:45

Servette (Switzerland)	1–1	(Norway) Rosenborg
Schneider 68'	Report	Dočkal 81'

Stade de Genève, Geneva
Attendance: 5,722
Referee: Simon Lee Evans (Wales)
9 August 2012
19:00

Rosenborg (Norway)	0–0	(Switzerland) Servette
	Report

Lerkendal Stadion, Trondheim
Attendance: 6,725
Referee: Neil Doyle (Republic of Ireland)

1–1 on aggregate; Rosenborg won on away goals.

2 August 2012
21:00

Athletic Bilbao (Spain)	3–1	(Croatia) Slaven Belupo
López 16', 68'; Susaeta 20'	Report	Delić 19'

San Mamés Stadium, Bilbao
Attendance: 23,986
Referee: Serhiy Boiko (Ukraine)
9 August 2012
18:45

Slaven Belupo (Croatia)	2–1	(Spain) Athletic Bilbao
Maras 28'; Gregurina 68'	Report	Muniain 47'

Gradski stadion, Koprivnica
Attendance: 2,800
Referee: Danny Makkelie (Netherlands)

Athletic Bilbao won 4–3 on aggregate.

2 August 2012
17:00

Anzhi Makhachkala (Russia)	2–0	(Netherlands) Vitesse
Shatov 63'; Smolov 74'	Report

Saturn Stadium, Ramenskoye (Note: Anzhi Makhachkala played their home match at Saturn Stadium, Ramenskoye instead of their regular stadium, Dynamo Stadium, Makhachkala, due to security issues involving the city of Makhachkala and the autonomous republic of Dagestan.)
Attendance: 5,000
Referee: Ruddy Buquet (France)
9 August 2012
20:00

Vitesse (Netherlands)	0–2	(Russia) Anzhi Makhachkala
	Report	Eto'o 48', 84' (pen.)

Gelredome, Arnhem
Attendance: 13,892
Referee: Michael Oliver (England)

Anzhi Makhachkala won 4–0 on aggregate.

2 August 2012
20:00

Asteras Tripolis (Greece)	1–1	(Portugal) Marítimo
Rayo 48'	Report	Fidélis 71'

Asteras Tripolis Stadium, Tripoli
Attendance: 2,780
Referee: Vlado Glodjović (Serbia)
9 August 2012
21:00

Marítimo (Portugal)	0–0	(Greece) Asteras Tripolis
	Report

Estádio dos Barreiros, Funchal
Attendance: 3,819
Referee: Paolo Valeri (Italy)

1–1 on aggregate; Marítimo won on away goals.

2 August 2012
19:30

Heerenveen (Netherlands)	4–0	(Romania) Rapid București
Đuričić 9', 64'; de Roon 69'; Fazli 89'	Report

Abe Lenstra Stadion, Heerenveen
Attendance: 18,000
Referee: Jorge Sousa (Portugal)
9 August 2012
20:30

Rapid București (Romania)	1–0	(Netherlands) Heerenveen
Herea 20' (pen.)	Report

Arena Națională, Bucharest (Note: Rapid București played their home match at Arena Națională, Bucharest instead of their regular stadium, Stadionul Giulești-Valentin Stănescu, Bucharest.)
Attendance: 1,928
Referee: Felix Zwayer (Germany)

Heerenveen won 4–1 on aggregate.

2 August 2012
19:00

Ruch Chorzów (Poland)	0–2	(Czech Republic) Viktoria Plzeň
	Report	Štípek 79'; Ďuriš 85'

Stadion Ruchu, Chorzów (Note: Stadion Ruchu capacity was limited to 4,000 because of renovation works.)
Attendance: 3,824
Referee: Antonio Damato (Italy)
9 August 2012
20:00

Viktoria Plzeň (Czech Republic)	5–0	(Poland) Ruch Chorzów
Ďuriš 2', 12', 28'; Bakoš 54'; Hanousek 87'	Report

Stadion města Plzně, Plzeň
Attendance: 11,651
Referee: Matej Jug (Slovenia)

Viktoria Plzeň won 7–0 on aggregate.

2 August 2012
20:15

Horsens (Denmark)	1–1	(Sweden) IF Elfsborg
Fagerberg 90+2' (pen.)	Report	Nilsson 65'

CASA Arena Horsens, Horsens
Attendance: 3,552
Referee: Mark Courtney (Northern Ireland)
9 August 2012
18:00

IF Elfsborg (Sweden)	2–3	(Denmark) Horsens
Nilsson 6'; Elm 18'	Report	Kryger 4'; Kortegaard 13', 36'

Borås Arena, Borås
Attendance: 3,467
Referee: Bobby Madden (Scotland)

Horsens won 4–3 on aggregate.

2 August 2012
19:00

APOEL (Cyprus)	2–1	(Norway) Aalesund
Mário Sérgio 34'; Aloneftis 80'	Report	Stewart 16'

GSP Stadium, Nicosia
Attendance: 16,708
Referee: Emir Alecković (Bosnia and Herzegovina)
9 August 2012
19:00

Aalesund (Norway)	0–1	(Cyprus) APOEL
	Report	Adorno 36'

Color Line Stadion, Ålesund
Attendance: 5,057
Referee: Hannes Kaasik (Estonia)

APOEL won 3–1 on aggregate.

2 August 2012
20:45

Hajduk Split (Croatia)	0–3	(Italy) Internazionale
	Report	Sneijder 18'; Nagatomo 44'; Coutinho 73'

Stadion Poljud, Split
Attendance: 30,832
Referee: Hüseyin Göçek (Turkey)
9 August 2012
20:45

Internazionale (Italy)	0–2	(Croatia) Hajduk Split
	Report	Vukušić 23' (pen.); Vuković 58'

San Siro, Milan
Attendance: 44,154
Referee: Clément Turpin (France)

Internazionale won 3–2 on aggregate.

2 August 2012
21:00

Vojvodina (Serbia)	2–1	(Austria) Rapid Wien
Oumarou 75'; Bojović 90+4'	Report	Alar 90+6'

Stadion Karađorđe, Novi Sad
Attendance: 8,000
Referee: Artyom Kuchin (Kazakhstan)
9 August 2012
21:05

Rapid Wien (Austria)	2–0	(Serbia) Vojvodina
Alar 90+1' (pen.); Boyd 90+8'	Report

Gerhard-Hanappi-Stadion, Vienna
Attendance: 15,800
Referee: Robert Małek (Poland)

Rapid Wien won 3–2 on aggregate.

2 August 2012
20:00

Genk (Belgium)	2–1	(Kazakhstan) Aktobe
Vossen 18' (pen.); Joseph-Monrose 44'	Report	Badlo 25'

Cristal Arena, Genk
Attendance: 15,350
Referee: Tony Asumaa (Finland)
9 August 2012
18:00

Aktobe (Kazakhstan)	1–2	(Belgium) Genk
Kenzhesariev 30'	Report	Benteke 36'; Buffel 51'

Central Stadium, Aktobe
Attendance: 12,300
Referee: Cyril Zimmermann (Switzerland)

Genk won 4–2 on aggregate.

2 August 2012
19:00

Tromsø (Norway)	1–1	(Ukraine) Metalurh Donetsk
Ondrášek 43'	Report	Björck 88' (o.g.)

Alfheim Stadion, Tromsø
Attendance: 2,276
Referee: Steven McLean (Scotland)
9 August 2012
19:00

Metalurh Donetsk (Ukraine)	0–1	(Norway) Tromsø
	Report	Prijović 9'

Metalurh Stadium, Donetsk
Attendance: 2,800
Referee: Aleksei Kulbakov (Belarus)

Tromsø won 2–1 on aggregate.

2 August 2012
19:45

Twente (Netherlands)	2–0	(Czech Republic) Mladá Boleslav
Fer 52'; Chadli 58'	Report

De Grolsch Veste, Enschede
Attendance: 18,500
Referee: Kristo Tohver (Estonia)
9 August 2012
19:00

Mladá Boleslav (Czech Republic)	0–2	(Netherlands) Twente
	Report	Chadli 9'; Fer 31'

Městský Stadium, Mladá Boleslav
Attendance: 3,077
Referee: Maksim Layushkin (Russia)

Twente won 4–0 on aggregate.

2 August 2012
19:00

Bnei Yehuda (Israel)	0–2	(Greece) PAOK
	Report	Georgiadis 62'; Athanasiadis 72'

Ramat Gan Stadium, Ramat Gan (Note: Bnei Yehuda played their home match at Ramat Gan Stadium in Tel Aviv District instead of their regular stadium, Bloomfield Stadium, Tel Aviv.)
Attendance: 2,156
Referee: Pavle Radovanović (Montenegro)
9 August 2012
20:00

PAOK (Greece)	4–1	(Israel) Bnei Yehuda
Athanasiadis 48', 52'; Robert 79'; Pelkas 90+1'	Report	Marinković 7'

Toumba Stadium, Thessaloniki
Attendance: 9,544
Referee: Cristian Balaj (Romania)

PAOK won 6–1 on aggregate.

2 August 2012
18:00

Dila Gori (Georgia (country))	0–1	(Cyprus) Anorthosis Famagusta
	Report	Okkas 69'

Mikheil Meskhi Stadium, Tbilisi (Note: Dila Gori played their home match at Mikheil Meskhi Stadium, Tbilisi instead of their regular stadium, Tengiz Burjanadze Stadium, Gori.)
Attendance: 7,500
Referee: Ken Henry Johnsen (Norway)
9 August 2012
19:00

Anorthosis Famagusta (Cyprus)	0–3 Abandoned (Note: The match was abandoned in the 82nd minute due to crowd disturbance. Dila Gori was leading 3–0. That result was confirmed standing by UEFA.)	(Georgia (country)) Dila Gori
	Report	Vatsadze 54', 80'; Salukvadze 78'

Antonis Papadopoulos Stadium, Larnaca
Attendance: 9,000
Referee: Mihaly Fabian (Hungary)

Dila Gori won 3–1 on aggregate.

== Play-off round ==
=== Summary ===
The draw for the play-off round was held on 10 August 2012. The first legs were played on 22 and 23 August, and the second legs were played on 28 and 30 August 2012.

Team 1	Agg.	Team 2	1st leg	2nd leg
Anzhi Makhachkala (Russia)	6–0	(Netherlands) AZ	1–0	5–0
Neftçi (Azerbaijan)	4–2 (Note: Order of legs reversed after original draw)	(Cyprus) APOEL	1–1	3–1
Atromitos (Greece)	1–2	(England) Newcastle United	1–1	0–1
Tromsø (Norway)	3–3 (a)	(Serbia) Partizan	3–2	0–1
Vaslui (Romania)	2–4	(Italy) Internazionale	0–2	2–2
Heart of Midlothian (Scotland)	1–2	(England) Liverpool	0–1	1–1
Athletic Bilbao (Spain)	9–3	(Finland) HJK	6–0	3–3
Marítimo (Portugal)	3–0	(Georgia (country)) Dila Gori	1–0	2–0
Molde (Norway)	4–1	(Netherlands) Heerenveen	2–0	2–1
Debrecen (Hungary)	1–7	(Belgium) Club Brugge	0–3	1–4
Sheriff Tiraspol (Moldova)	1–2	(France) Marseille	1–2	0–0
Trabzonspor (Turkey)	0–0 (2–4 p)	(Hungary) Videoton	0–0	0–0 (a.e.t.)
Midtjylland (Denmark)	2–3	(Switzerland) Young Boys	0–3	2–0
Śląsk Wrocław (Poland)	4–10	(Germany) Hannover 96	3–5	1–5
Dinamo București (Romania)	1–4	(Ukraine) Metalist Kharkiv	0–2	1–2
Horsens (Denmark)	1–6	(Portugal) Sporting CP	1–1	0–5
F91 Dudelange (Luxembourg)	1–7	(Israel) Hapoel Tel Aviv	1–3	0–4
Feyenoord (Netherlands)	2–4	(Czech Republic) Sparta Prague	2–2	0–2
Motherwell (Scotland)	0–3	(Spain) Levante	0–2	0–1
Red Star Belgrade (Serbia)	2–3	(France) Bordeaux	0–0	2–3
Lokeren (Belgium)	2–2 (a)	(Czech Republic) Viktoria Plzeň	2–1	0–1
Mura 05 (Slovenia)	1–5	(Italy) Lazio	0–2	1–3
AIK (Sweden)	2–1	(Russia) CSKA Moscow	0–1	2–0
Legia Warsaw (Poland)	2–3	(Norway) Rosenborg	1–1	1–2
Bursaspor (Turkey)	4–5	(Netherlands) Twente	3–1	1–4 (a.e.t.)
Ekranas (Lithuania)	0–5	(Romania) Steaua București	0–2	0–3
Slovan Liberec (Czech Republic)	4–6	(Ukraine) Dnipro Dnipropetrovsk	2–2	2–4
VfB Stuttgart (Germany)	3–1	(Russia) Dynamo Moscow	2–0	1–1
PAOK (Greece)	2–4	(Austria) Rapid Wien	2–1	0–3
Luzern (Switzerland)	2–3	(Belgium) Genk	2–1	0–2
Zeta (Montenegro)	0–14	(Netherlands) PSV Eindhoven	0–5	0–9

=== Matches ===
23 August 2012
18:00

Anzhi Makhachkala (Russia)	1–0	(Netherlands) AZ
Traoré 51'	Report

Lokomotiv Stadium, Moscow (Note: Anzhi Makhachkala played their home match at Lokomotiv Stadium, Moscow instead of their regular stadium, Dynamo Stadium, Makhachkala, due to security issues involving the city of Makhachkala and the autonomous republic of Dagestan.)
Attendance: 6,030
Referee: Michael Koukoulakis (Greece)
30 August 2012
21:00

AZ (Netherlands)	0–5	(Russia) Anzhi Makhachkala
	Report	Boussoufa 17'; Eto'o 45+2'; Traoré 79'; Carcela 83'; Lakhiyalov 90+4'

AFAS Stadion, Alkmaar
Attendance: 11,512
Referee: Svein Oddvar Moen (Norway)

Anzhi Makhachkala won 6–0 on aggregate.

23 August 2012
18:00

Neftçi (Azerbaijan)	1–1	(Cyprus) APOEL
Shukurov 82' (pen.)	Report	Benachour 83'

Dalga Arena, Baku (Note: Neftçi played their home match at Dalga Arena, Baku instead of their regular stadium, Ismat Gayibov Stadium, Baku.)
Attendance: 4,000
Referee: Robert Małek (Poland)
30 August 2012
19:00

APOEL (Cyprus)	1–3	(Azerbaijan) Neftçi
Benachour 44'	Report	Imamverdiyev 22'; Wobay 30'; Flavinho 60'

GSP Stadium, Nicosia
Attendance: 20,337
Referee: Saïd Ennjimi (France)

Neftçi won 4–2 on aggregate.

23 August 2012
19:00

Atromitos (Greece)	1–1	(England) Newcastle United
Epstein 24'	Report	R. Taylor 45+1'

Peristeri Stadium, Peristeri
Attendance: 5,002
Referee: Alon Yefet (Israel)
30 August 2012
21:00

Newcastle United (England)	1–0	(Greece) Atromitos
Vučkić 21'	Report

St James' Park, Newcastle upon Tyne
Attendance: 29,242
Referee: Stephan Studer (Switzerland)

Newcastle United won 2–1 on aggregate.

23 August 2012
18:30

Tromsø (Norway)	3–2	(Serbia) Partizan
Prijović 37'; Björck 77'; Mbodj 82'	Report	S. Marković 43'; Mitrović 84'

Alfheim Stadion, Tromsø
Attendance: 3,386
Referee: Robert Schörgenhofer (Austria)
30 August 2012
20:45

Partizan (Serbia)	1–0	(Norway) Tromsø
Ivanov 75'	Report

Stadion FK Partizan, Belgrade
Attendance: 14,725
Referee: Serge Gumienny (Belgium)

3–3 on aggregate; Partizan won on away goals.

23 August 2012
20:45

Vaslui (Romania)	0–2	(Italy) Internazionale
	Report	Cambiasso 23'; Palacio 73'

Stadionul Ceahlăul, Piatra Neamț (Note: Vaslui played their home match at Stadionul Ceahlăul, Piatra Neamț instead of their regular stadium, Stadionul Municipal, Vaslui.)
Attendance: 13,500
Referee: Bas Nijhuis (Netherlands)
30 August 2012
20:45

Internazionale (Italy)	2–2	(Romania) Vaslui
Palacio 76'; Guarín 90+2'	Report	Stanciu 35' (pen.); Varela 79'

San Siro, Milan
Attendance: 41,326
Referee: Jorge Sousa (Portugal)

Internazionale won 4–2 on aggregate.

23 August 2012
20:45

Heart of Midlothian (Scotland)	0–1	(England) Liverpool
	Report	Webster 78' (o.g.)

Tynecastle Stadium, Edinburgh
Attendance: 15,965
Referee: Florian Meyer (Germany)
30 August 2012
21:05

Liverpool (England)	1–1	(Scotland) Heart of Midlothian
Suárez 88'	Report	Templeton 85'

Anfield, Liverpool
Attendance: 44,361
Referee: Vladislav Bezborodov (Russia)

Liverpool won 2–1 on aggregate.

23 August 2012
21:00

Athletic Bilbao (Spain)	6–0	(Finland) HJK
Aduriz 25', 51'; Susaeta 31', 57'; Iñigo Pérez 42'; Iraola 85'	Report

San Mamés Stadium, Bilbao
Attendance: 18,288
Referee: Bülent Yıldırım (Turkey)
30 August 2012
19:00

HJK (Finland)	3–3	(Spain) Athletic Bilbao
Schüller 25'; Perovuo 62'; Pohjanpalo 70'	Report	San José 67'; Hakanpää 77' (o.g.); Martínez 88'

Sonera Stadium, Helsinki
Attendance: 5,580
Referee: Alan Kelly (Republic of Ireland)

Athletic Bilbao won 9–3 on aggregate.

23 August 2012
21:00

Marítimo (Portugal)	1–0	(Georgia (country)) Dila Gori
Fidélis 64'	Report

Estádio dos Barreiros, Funchal
Attendance: 3,736
Referee: Libor Kovařík (Czech Republic)
30 August 2012
18:00

Dila Gori (Georgia (country))	0–2	(Portugal) Marítimo
	Report	Héldon 42'; Danilo Dias 90+3'

Mikheil Meskhi Stadium, Tbilisi
Attendance: 10,000
Referee: Anastassios Kakos (Greece)

Marítimo won 3–0 on aggregate.

23 August 2012
19:00

Molde (Norway)	2–0	(Netherlands) Heerenveen
Eikrem 31'; Moström 90'	Report

Aker Stadion, Molde
Attendance: 4,656
Referee: Cristian Balaj (Romania)
30 August 2012
19:00

Heerenveen (Netherlands)	1–2	(Norway) Molde
Valpoort 90+2'	Report	Berget 54'; Diouf 73'

Abe Lenstra Stadion, Heerenveen
Attendance: 10,000
Referee: Stanislav Todorov (Bulgaria)

Molde won 4–1 on aggregate.

23 August 2012
20:30

Debrecen (Hungary)	0–3	(Belgium) Club Brugge
	Report	Blondel 58'; Refaelov 77'; Bacca 90+1'

Városi Stadion, Nyíregyháza (Note: Debrecen played their home match at Városi Stadion, Nyíregyháza instead of their regular stadium, Stadion Oláh Gábor Út, Debrecen.)
Attendance: 4,234
Referee: Matej Jug (Slovenia)
30 August 2012
20:30

Club Brugge (Belgium)	4–1	(Hungary) Debrecen
Larsen 25'; Vázquez 48'; Tchité 50'; Bacca 66'	Report	Szakály 34'

Jan Breydel Stadium, Bruges
Attendance: 18,353
Referee: Deniz Aytekin (Germany)

Club Brugge won 7–1 on aggregate.

23 August 2012
19:00

Sheriff Tiraspol (Moldova)	1–2	(France) Marseille
Pajović 27'	Report	J. Ayew 18', 53'

Sheriff Stadium, Tiraspol
Attendance: 11,770
Referee: Sascha Kever (Switzerland)
30 August 2012
20:30

Marseille (France)	0–0	(Moldova) Sheriff Tiraspol
	Report

Stade Vélodrome, Marseille
Attendance: 9,583
Referee: Kristinn Jakobsson (Iceland)

Marseille won 2–1 on aggregate.

23 August 2012
20:00

Trabzonspor (Turkey)	0–0	(Hungary) Videoton
	Report

Hüseyin Avni Aker Stadium, Trabzon
Attendance: 22,778
Referee: Euan Norris (Scotland)
30 August 2012
20:30

Videoton (Hungary)	0–0 (a.e.t.)	(Turkey) Trabzonspor
	Report
Penalties
Caneira (penalty scored); Brachi (penalty scored); Gyurcsó (penalty scored); Mitrović (penalty scored)	4–2	(penalty scored) Sapara; (penalty scored) Vittek; (penalty missed) Aydoğdu; (penalty missed) Zokora

Sóstói Stadion, Székesfehérvár
Attendance: 11,232
Referee: Martin Hansson (Sweden)

0–0 on aggregate; Videoton won 4–2 on penalties.

23 August 2012
20:15

Midtjylland (Denmark)	0–3	(Switzerland) Young Boys
	Report	Bobadilla 42'; Farnerud 81'; Costanzo 90+3'

MCH Arena, Herning
Attendance: 4,522
Referee: Maksim Layushkin (Russia)
30 August 2012
19:30

Young Boys (Switzerland)	0–2	(Denmark) Midtjylland
	Report	Igboun 75' (pen.); Bak Nielsen 89'

Stade de Suisse, Bern
Attendance: 9,327
Referee: Alexandru Tudor (Romania)

Young Boys won 3–2 on aggregate.

23 August 2012
20:45

Śląsk Wrocław (Poland)	3–5	(Germany) Hannover 96
Jodłowiec 34'; Patejuk 54'; Kaźmierczak 61'	Report	Andreasen 7', 82'; Schlaudraff 25'; Stindl 40'; Schmiedebach 85'

Stadion Miejski, Wrocław
Attendance: 13,644
Referee: Paolo Tagliavento (Italy)
30 August 2012
20:45

Hannover 96 (Germany)	5–1	(Poland) Śląsk Wrocław
Abdellaoue 22'; Huszti 35', 88'; Sobiech 68', 85'	Report	Kaźmierczak 10'

AWD-Arena, Hanover
Attendance: 26,200
Referee: Sergei Karasev (Russia)

Hannover 96 won 10–4 on aggregate.

23 August 2012
19:30

Dinamo București (Romania)	0–2	(Ukraine) Metalist Kharkiv
	Report	Cleiton Xavier 9'; Cristaldo 57'

Arena Națională, Bucharest (Note: Dinamo București played their home match at Arena Națională, Bucharest instead of their regular stadium, Stadionul Dinamo, Bucharest, as it had greater capacity.)
Attendance: 14,800
Referee: Pawel Gil (Poland)
30 August 2012
20:00

Metalist Kharkiv (Ukraine)	2–1	(Romania) Dinamo București
Blanco 29'; Cristaldo 60'	Report	Curtean 52'

Metalist Stadium, Kharkiv
Attendance: 30,417
Referee: Hüseyin Göçek (Turkey)

Metalist Kharkiv won 4–1 on aggregate.

23 August 2012
21:00

Horsens (Denmark)	1–1	(Portugal) Sporting CP
Spelmann 15'	Report	Carrillo 79'

CASA Arena Horsens, Horsens
Attendance: 6,644
Referee: Antony Gautier (France)
30 August 2012
21:30

Sporting CP (Portugal)	5–0	(Denmark) Horsens
Van Wolfswinkel 8', 54'; Kortegaard 23' (o.g.); Carrillo 57'; Elias 63'	Report

Estádio José Alvalade, Lisbon
Attendance: 25,030
Referee: Cyril Zimmermann (Switzerland)

Sporting CP won 6–1 on aggregate.

23 August 2012
20:00

F91 Dudelange (Luxembourg)	1–3	(Israel) Hapoel Tel Aviv
Joachim 20'	Report	Caillet 4' (o.g.); Ben Haim II 19' (pen.); Cohen 26'

Stade Municipal de Differdange, Differdange (Note: F91 Dudelange played their home match at Stade Municipal de Differdange, Differdange instead of their regular stadium, Stade Jos Nosbaum, Dudelange.)
Attendance: 937
Referee: Tommy Skjerven (Norway)
30 August 2012
19:00

Hapoel Tel Aviv (Israel)	4–0	(Luxembourg) F91 Dudelange
Maman 68', 84'; Merey 79'; Tuama 88'	Report

Bloomfield Stadium, Tel Aviv
Attendance: 5,407
Referee: Hannes Kaasik (Estonia)

Hapoel Tel Aviv won 7–1 on aggregate.

23 August 2012
20:00

Feyenoord (Netherlands)	2–2	(Czech Republic) Sparta Prague
Nelom 60'; Achahbar 90+3'	Report	V. Kadlec 23', 27'

Stadion Feijenoord, Rotterdam
Attendance: 34,000
Referee: Peter Rasmussen (Denmark)
30 August 2012
19:30

Sparta Prague (Czech Republic)	2–0	(Netherlands) Feyenoord
Kadlec 61' (pen.); Jarošík 70'	Report

Generali Arena, Prague
Attendance: 17,036
Referee: Ivan Bebek (Croatia)

Sparta Prague won 4–2 on aggregate.

23 August 2012
20:45

Motherwell (Scotland)	0–2	(Spain) Levante
	Report	Juanlu 42'; El Zhar 62'

Fir Park Stadium, Motherwell
Attendance: 6,286
Referee: Antti Munukka (Finland)
30 August 2012
20:45

Levante (Spain)	1–0	(Scotland) Motherwell
Gekas 72'	Report

Estadi Ciutat de València, Valencia
Attendance: 13,398
Referee: Clément Turpin (France)

Levante won 3–0 on aggregate.

23 August 2012
21:00

Red Star Belgrade (Serbia)	0–0	(France) Bordeaux
	Report

Stadion FK Crvena Zvezda, Belgrade
Attendance: 42,100
Referee: Alberto Undiano Mallenco (Spain)
30 August 2012
20:30

Bordeaux (France)	3–2	(Serbia) Red Star Belgrade
Gouffran 53', 90+3' (pen.); Jussiê 71'	Report	Mladenović 45+2'; Mikić 90'

Stade Chaban-Delmas, Bordeaux
Attendance: 21,789
Referee: Mark Clattenburg (England)

Bordeaux won 3–2 on aggregate.

23 August 2012
20:30

Lokeren (Belgium)	2–1	(Czech Republic) Viktoria Plzeň
Harbaoui 10'; Marić 90+4' (pen.)	Report	Bakoš 29'

King Baudouin Stadium, Brussels (Note: Lokeren played their home match at King Baudouin Stadium, Brussels instead of their regular stadium, Daknamstadion, Lokeren.)
Attendance: 4,254
Referee: Antonio Mateu Lahoz (Spain)
30 August 2012
20:15

Viktoria Plzeň (Czech Republic)	1–0	(Belgium) Lokeren
Bakoš 37'	Report

Stadion města Plzně, Plzeň
Attendance: 11,711
Referee: Jonas Eriksson (Sweden)

2–2 on aggregate; Viktoria Plzeň won on away goals.

23 August 2012
21:00

Mura 05 (Slovenia)	0–2	(Italy) Lazio
	Report	Hernanes 31'; Klose 59'

Ljudski vrt, Maribor
Attendance: 4,200
Referee: Mark Courtney (Northern Ireland)
30 August 2012
21:00

Lazio (Italy)	3–1	(Slovenia) Mura 05
Kozák 30', 55'; Zárate 42'	Report	Travner 88'

Stadio Olimpico, Rome
Attendance: 12,138
Referee: Leontios Trattou (Cyprus)

Lazio won 5–1 on aggregate.

23 August 2012
19:00

AIK (Sweden)	0–1	(Russia) CSKA Moscow
	Report	Honda 61'

Råsunda Stadium, Solna
Attendance: 16,889
Referee: Kevin Blom (Netherlands)
30 August 2012
19:00

CSKA Moscow (Russia)	0–2	(Sweden) AIK
	Report	Karikari 6'; Lorentzson 90+3'

Arena Khimki, Khimki
Attendance: 11,000
Referee: Ovidiu Alin Hategan (Romania)

AIK won 2–1 on aggregate.

23 August 2012
19:00

Legia Warsaw (Poland)	1–1	(Norway) Rosenborg
Kosecki 42'	Report	Dočkal 80'

Pepsi Arena, Warsaw
Attendance: 21,637
Referee: Aleksandar Stavrev (Macedonia)
30 August 2012
19:00

Rosenborg (Norway)	2–1	(Poland) Legia Warsaw
Reginiussen 69'; Diskerud 87'	Report	Ljuboja 36'

Lerkendal Stadion, Trondheim
Attendance: 8,712
Referee: Daniele Orsato (Italy)

Rosenborg won 3–2 on aggregate.

23 August 2012
19:30

Bursaspor (Turkey)	3–1	(Netherlands) Twente
Batalla 40', 82'; Šesták 53'	Report	Chadli 31'

Bursa Atatürk Stadium, Bursa
Attendance: 24,216
Referee: David Fernández Borbalán (Spain)
30 August 2012
21:00

Twente (Netherlands)	4–1 (a.e.t.)	(Turkey) Bursaspor
Fer 26' (pen.), 116'; Schilder 61'; Gutiérrez 62'	Report	Pinto 45+4'

De Grolsch Veste, Enschede
Attendance: 22,000
Referee: Nicola Rizzoli (Italy)

Twente won 5–4 on aggregate.

23 August 2012
18:45

Ekranas (Lithuania)	0–2	(Romania) Steaua București
	Report	Martinović 36'; Popa 76'

LFF Stadium, Vilnius (Note: Ekranas played their home match at LFF Stadium, Vilnius instead of their regular stadium, Aukštaitija Stadium, Panevėžys.)
Attendance: 756
Referee: Aleksei Kulbakov (Belarus)
30 August 2012
19:30

Steaua București (Romania)	3–0	(Lithuania) Ekranas
Rocha 21', 86'; Dumitraș 31'	Report

Stadionul Steaua, Bucharest
Attendance: 14,841
Referee: Tony Asumaa (Finland)

Steaua București won 5–0 on aggregate.

23 August 2012
19:00

Slovan Liberec (Czech Republic)	2–2	(Ukraine) Dnipro Dnipropetrovsk
Breznaník 62'; Vácha 90' (pen.)	Report	Konoplyanka 43'; Matheus 49'

Stadion u Nisy, Liberec
Attendance: 4,226
Referee: Pol van Boekel (Netherlands)
30 August 2012
18:00

Dnipro Dnipropetrovsk (Ukraine)	4–2	(Czech Republic) Slovan Liberec
Aliyev 12' (pen.), 59' (pen.); Konoplyanka 76'; Kalinić 87'	Report	Breznaník 61'; Kelić 72'

Dnipro Arena, Dnipropetrovsk
Attendance: 27,076
Referee: Duarte Gomes (Portugal)

Dnipro Dnipropetrovsk won 6–4 on aggregate.

22 August 2012
18:15

VfB Stuttgart (Germany)	2–0	(Russia) Dynamo Moscow
Ibišević 72', 90+1'	Report

Mercedes-Benz Arena, Stuttgart
Attendance: 20,353
Referee: William Collum (Scotland)
28 August 2012
18:00

Dynamo Moscow (Russia)	1–1	(Germany) VfB Stuttgart
Kokorin 77'	Report	Ibišević 64'

Arena Khimki, Khimki
Attendance: 7,164
Referee: Fırat Aydınus (Turkey)

VfB Stuttgart won 3–1 on aggregate.

23 August 2012
20:30

PAOK (Greece)	2–1	(Austria) Rapid Wien
Athanasiadis 69'; Katsikas 83'	Report	Alar 25'

Toumba Stadium, Thessaloniki
Attendance: 19,628
Referee: Andre Marriner (England)
30 August 2012
20:45

Rapid Wien (Austria)	3–0	(Greece) PAOK
Alar 31'; Boyd 48'; Hofmann 90+3'	Report

Gerhard-Hanappi-Stadion, Vienna
Attendance: 16,500
Referee: Carlos Clos Gómez (Spain)

Rapid Wien won 4–2 on aggregate.

23 August 2012
19:30

Luzern (Switzerland)	2–1	(Belgium) Genk
Rangelov 7'; Winter 71'	Report	Vossen 12'

Swissporarena, Lucerne
Attendance: 8,217
Referee: Antonio Damato (Italy)
30 August 2012
20:00

Genk (Belgium)	2–0	(Switzerland) Luzern
Fernández 56'; Masika 88'	Report

Cristal Arena, Genk
Attendance: 12,135
Referee: Mike Dean (England)

Genk won 3–2 on aggregate.

23 August 2012
21:00

Zeta (Montenegro)	0–5	(Netherlands) PSV Eindhoven
	Report	Toivonen 2'; Matavž 74'; Strootman 77'; Lens 83'; Van Bommel 90'

Stadion pod Goricom, Podgorica
Attendance: 7,001
Referee: Aleksei Nikolaev (Russia)
30 August 2012
19:00

PSV Eindhoven (Netherlands)	9–0	(Montenegro) Zeta
Jørgensen 5'; Van Ooijen 12', 74'; Matavž 15', 27', 63'; Wijnaldum 39', 66', 83'	Report

Philips Stadion, Eindhoven
Attendance: 20,400
Referee: Menashe Masiah (Israel)

PSV Eindhoven won 14–0 on aggregate.
