= Samir Bousenine =

Andorran international footballer

Personal information
- Date of birth: 7 February 1991 (age 35)
- Position: Right winger

Team information
- Current team: Inter Club d'Escaldes

Senior career*
| Years | Team | Apps | (Gls) |
| 2009–2010 | FC Andorra | | |
| 2010–2012 | FC Santa Coloma | | |
| 2012–2013 | TF Croix-Daurade | | |
| 2013–2014 | AS Tournefeuille | 17 | (2) |
| 2014–2015 | US Revel | | |
| 2015–2016 | FC Lusitanos | | |
| 2016–2017 | UE Engordany | 17 | (2) |
| 2017– | Inter Club d'Escaldes | 8 | (0) |

International career^{‡}
| 2010–2012 | Andorra | 4 | (0) |
- * Club domestic league appearances and goals as of 14:03, 16 November 2018 (UTC) ‡ National team caps and goals as of 14:03, 16 November 2018 (UTC)

Samir Bousenine (born 7 February 1991) is an Andorran international footballer who plays for Inter Club d'Escaldes, as a right winger.

== Career ==
Bousenine has played for FC Andorra, FC Santa Coloma, TF Croix-Daurade, AS Tournefeuille, US Revel, FC Lusitanos, UE Engordany and Inter Club d'Escaldes.

He made his international debut for Andorra in 2010.
