= KF Bashkimi Stadium =

Association football stadium in Kumanovo, North Macedonia

Coordinates: 42.1420989°N 21.7099741°E

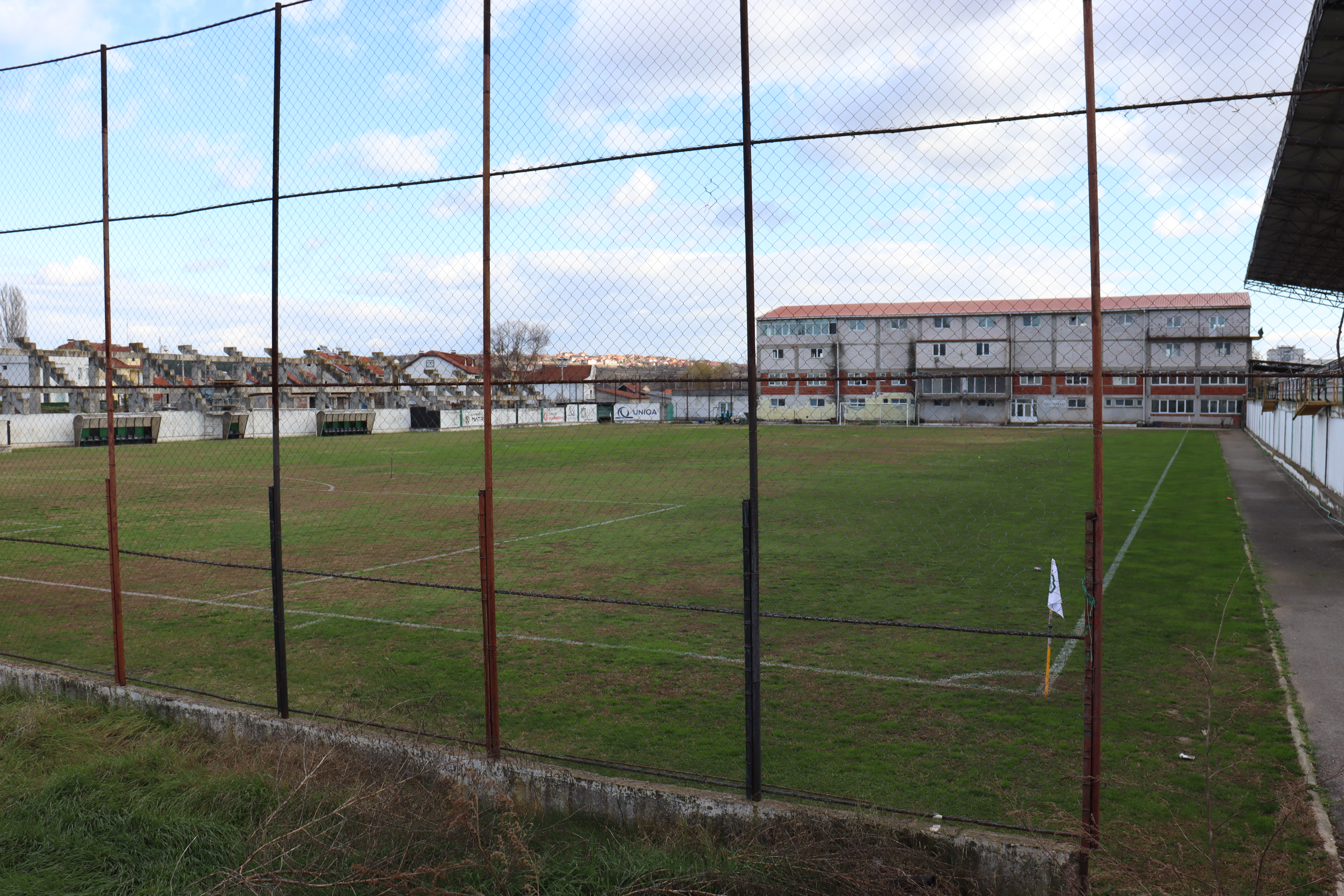
- Interactive map of KF Bashkimi Stadium
- Former names: Milano Arena
- Location: Kumanovo, North Macedonia
- Owner: KF Bashkimi 1947
- Capacity: 3,500
- Surface: Natural Grass

Tenants
- KF Bashkimi 1947

KF Bashkimi Stadium is a football stadium in Kumanovo, North Macedonia. It is the home stadium of KF Bashkimi 1947. It has a capacity of 3,500 people.

In 2024, a spectator died at the stadium after falling.
