= 2012–13 AC Sparta Prague season =

Sparta Prague
2012–13 season
- Manager: Vítězslav Lavička
- Stadium: Generali Arena
- Czech First League: 2nd
- Czech Cup: Semi-finals
- UEFA Europa League: Round of 32
- Top goalscorer: League: Václav Kadlec (14)
- Biggest win: 4–0 v Slovácko (Home, 24 February 2013, Czech First League); 4–0 v Mladá Boleslav (Home, 12 May 2013, Czech First League)
- Biggest defeat: 0–2 v Slovan Liberec (Away, 4 May 2013, Czech First League)

The 2012–13 season was Athletic Club Sparta Prague's 20th consecutive season in the Czech First League. In addition to the domestic league, Sparta Prague participated in that season's editions of the Czech Cup and the UEFA Europa League.

== Squad ==
Squad at end of season

Note: Flags indicate national team as defined under FIFA eligibility rules; some limited exceptions apply. Players may hold more than one non-FIFA nationality.

No.	Pos.	Nation	Player
1	GK	CZE	Marek Čech
3	MF	CRO	Manuel Pamić
4	DF	CZE	Ondřej Švejdík
6	MF	CZE	Lukáš Vácha
7	FW	CZE	Tomáš Přikryl
8	MF	CZE	Marek Matějovský
9	FW	ALB	Bekim Balaj
11	FW	CMR	Léonard Kweuke
13	DF	CZE	Adam Jánoš
14	FW	CZE	Václav Kadlec
16	MF	CZE	Pavel Kadeřábek
19	DF	CZE	Matěj Hybš
20	DF	CZE	Tomáš Zápotočný

No.	Pos.	Nation	Player
21	FW	CZE	David Lafata
22	MF	CZE	Josef Hušbauer
23	MF	CZE	Ladislav Krejčí
24	DF	CZE	Vlastimil Vidlička
25	MF	CZE	Mario Holek
26	MF	CZE	David Hovorka
27	DF	CZE	Roman Polom
28	MF	CZE	Adam Kučera
29	FW	CZE	Roman Bednář
30	GK	CZE	Tomáš Holý
31	GK	CZE	Tomáš Vaclík
39	MF	CZE	Jiří Jarošík

== Competitions ==
=== Overview ===
Competition	First match	Last match	Starting round	Final position	Record							
Competition	First match	Last match	Starting round	Final position	Pld	W	D	L	GF	GA	GD	Win %
Czech First League	28 July 2012	1 June 2013	Matchday 1	2nd	30	19	6	5	55	23	+32	63.33
Czech Cup	31 October 2012	8 May 2013	Third round	Semi-finals	7	2	4	1	13	10	+3	28.57
UEFA Europa League	2 August 2012	21 February 2013	Third qualifying round	Round of 32	12	4	6	2	18	12	+6	33.33
Total					49	25	16	8	86	45	+41	51.02

Source: Competitions

=== Czech First League ===
==== League table ====
Pos	Team	Pld	W	D	L	GF	GA	GD	Pts	Qualification or relegation
1	Viktoria Plzeň (C)	30	20	5	5	54	21	+33	65	Qualification for Champions League second qualifying round
2	Sparta Prague	30	19	6	5	55	23	+32	63	Qualification for Europa League second qualifying round
3	Slovan Liberec	30	16	6	8	46	34	+12	54	Qualification for Europa League second qualifying round
4	Jablonec	30	13	10	7	49	41	+8	49	Qualification for Europa League third qualifying round (Note: Jablonec won the 2012–13 Czech Cup and qualified for the third qualifying round of the UEFA Europa League.)
5	Sigma Olomouc	30	13	8	9	38	29	+9	47	

Source: Fortuna liga
Rules for classification: 1) points; 2) head-to-head points; 3) head-to-head goal difference; 4) head-to-head goals scored; 5) goal difference; 6) number of goals scored.
(C) Champions

==== Results summary ====
Overall								Home						Away					
Pld	W	D	L	GF	GA	GD	Pts	W	D	L	GF	GA	GD	W	D	L	GF	GA	GD
30	19	6	5	55	23	+32	63	12	2	1	33	10	+23	7	4	4	22	13	+9

Source: Competitions

==== Results by round ====
Round	1	2	3	4	5	6	7	8	9	10	11	12	13	14	15	16	17	18	19	20	21	22	23	24	25	26	27	28	29	30
Ground	A	H	A	H	A	H	A	H	A	H	A	H	A	H	H	A	H	A	H	A	H	A	H	A	H	A	H	A	A	H
Result	D	W	W	W	W	W	L	L	L	W	D	W	D	W	W	D	W	W	D	W	W	W	W	W	D	L	W	L	W	W
Position	10	4	1	1	1	1	2	3	4	2	3	2	4	2	2	3	2	2	2	2	2	2	2	2	2	2	2	2	2	2
Points	1	4	7	10	13	16	16	16	16	19	20	23	24	27	30	31	34	37	38	41	44	47	50	53	54	54	57	57	60	63

Source: Matches
A = Away; H = Home; W = Win; D = Draw; L = Loss

==== Matches ====
28 July 2012 1	Dukla Prague	1–1	Sparta Prague	Prague
18:00 CEST (UTC+2)	Hašek (yellow card) 9', (goal) 30' (pen.); Malý (yellow card) 49'; Podrazký (yellow card) 74'; Gedeon (yellow card) 75'; Pospěch (yellow card) 80'	Report	Gil (yellow card) 3'; Švejdík (yellow card) 29'; Kweuke (yellow card) 59', (goal) 90'; Hušbauer (yellow card) 82'	Stadium: Stadion Juliska; Attendance: 4,257; Referee: Karel Hrubeš; Assistant referees: Dušan Pospíšil, Tomáš Kovařík

5 August 2012 2	Sparta Prague	2–1	Příbram	Prague
17:00 CEST (UTC+2)	Hušbauer (yellow card) 36'; Kadeřábek 50'; Balaj (yellow card) 62'; Kweuke 65'	Report	Trapp 15'	Stadium: Generali Arena; Referee: Jiří Adam; Assistant referees: Václav Štěrba, Zdeněk Dobrovolný

12 August 2012 3	Slovácko	1–4	Sparta Prague	Uherské Hradiště
17:00 CEST (UTC+2)	Trousil 23'; Kuncl (yellow card) 28'; Kubáň (yellow card) 49'; Došek (yellow card) 78'; Kerbr (yellow card) 87'	Report	Pavelka 7'; Balaj 13'; Hušbauer 42'; Kadlec 50' (pen.), (yellow card) 51'	Stadium: Městský fotbalový stadion Miroslava Valenty; Attendance: 6,532; Referee: Radek Příhoda; Assistant referees: Jiří Moláček, Jiří Jiřík

19 August 2012 4	Sparta Prague	3–1	Dynamo České Budějovice	Prague
17:00 CEST (UTC+2)	Kadlec 26'; Hušbauer (yellow card) 37'; Kweuke 51', (yellow card) 68'; Kadeřábek (yellow card) 55', (goal) 89'; Jarošík (yellow card) 72'	Report	Marković 35'; Halama (yellow card) 42'; Klesa (yellow card) 51'	Stadium: Generali Arena; Referee: Martin Nenadál; Assistant referees: Kryštof Mencl, Ondřej Pelikán

27 August 2012 5	Jablonec	1–2	Sparta Prague	Jablonec nad Nisou
18:00 CEST (UTC+2)	Lafata (yellow card) 43'; Beneš 86'	Report	Pamić (yellow card) 24'; Jarošík 34'; Matějovský (yellow card) 45'; Vaclík (yellow card) 78'; Kadlec (yellow card) 90'; Přikryl 90'	Stadium: Stadion Střelnice; Attendance: 5,958; Referee: Libor Kovařík; Assistant referees: Ivo Nádvorník, Dušan Pospíšil

2 September 2012 6	Sparta Prague	1–0	Hradec Králové	Prague
17:00 CEST (UTC+2)	Balaj 39'	Report	Šisler (yellow card) 45'; Fukal (yellow card) 68'	Stadium: Generali Arena; Attendance: 9,631; Referee: Jan Jílek; Assistant referees: Emanuel Marek, Václav Štěrba

15 September 2012 7	Viktoria Plzeň	1–0	Sparta Prague	Plzeň
15:00 CEST (UTC+2)	Řezník (yellow card) 31'; Horváth 40' (pen.); Fillo (yellow card) 77'	Report	Pamić (yellow card) 17'; Kadlec (yellow card) 22'; Pavelka (yellow card) 37'; Hušbauer (yellow card) 39'; Kweuke (yellow card) 55'	Stadium: Doosan Arena; Attendance: 11,722; Referee: Radek Matějek; Assistant referees: Jan Paták, Josef Košec

24 September 2012 8	Sparta Prague	1–2	Sigma Olomouc	Prague
19:30 CEST (UTC+2)	Pamić (yellow card) 58'; Kadlec 60' (pen.); Gil (yellow card) 64'; Pavelka (yellow card) 69'	Report	Schulmeister (yellow card) 19'; Blaha (yellow card) 59'; Ordoš 66', 78'; Hořava (yellow card) 89'	Stadium: Generali Arena; Attendance: 7,756; Referee: Tomáš Adámek; Assistant referees: Jiří Jiřík, Robert Hájek

29 September 2012 9	Slavia Prague	1–0	Sparta Prague	Prague
20:00 CEST (UTC+2)	Nitrianský (yellow card) 55'; Latka 73', (yellow card) 90'; Čontofalský (yellow card) 90'; Kisel (yellow card) 90'	Report	Hušbauer (yellow card) 20'; Holek (yellow card) 79'	Stadium: Eden Arena; Attendance: 15,654; Referee: Radek Příhoda; Assistant referees: Patrik Filípek, Kryštof Mencl

8 October 2012 10	Sparta Prague	2–0	Baník Ostrava	Prague
19:00 CEST (UTC+2)	Zápotočný 16'; Kadlec 67'	Report	Mach (yellow card) 21'; Zawada (yellow card) 25'	Stadium: Generali Arena; Attendance: 9,145; Referee: Drahoslav Drábek; Assistant referees: Antonín Kordula, Emanuel Marek

21 October 2012 11	Vysočina Jihlava	1–1	Sparta Prague	Jihlava
17:30 CEST (UTC+2)	Tecl 31'; Rada (yellow card) 33'; Blažek (yellow card) 90'	Report	Kadlec 11'; Hušbauer (yellow card) 73'; Holek (yellow card) 90'; Švejdík (yellow card) 90'	Stadium: Stadion v Jiráskově ulici Attendance: 4,100; Referee: Pavel Královec; Assistant referees: Roman Slyško, Martin Wilczek

28 October 2012 12	Sparta Prague	2–1	Slovan Liberec	Prague
18:00 CET (UTC+1)	Balaj (yellow card) 28'; Jarošík 32'; Švejdík 63'; Krejčí (yellow card) 68'	Report	Vácha (yellow card) 13' (red card) 90'; Blažek 74'; Bosančić (yellow card) 79'	Stadium: Generali Arena; Attendance: 7,350; Referee: Libor Kovařík; Assistant referees: Kryštof Mencl, Ivo Nádvorník

3 November 2012 13	Mladá Boleslav	1–1	Sparta Prague	Mladá Boleslav
19:30 CET (UTC+1)	Mareš (yellow card) 26' (red card) 74', (goal) 57'; Kulič (yellow card) 35'; Janíček (yellow card) 74'	Report	Holek (yellow card) 34'; Zápotočný (yellow card) 61'; Hušbauer 76' (pen.)	Stadium: Městský stadion Attendance: 4,348; Referee: Petr Ardeleánu; Assistant referees: Dušan Pospíšil, Jan Paták

11 November 2012 14	Sparta Prague	2–0	Zbrojovka Brno	Prague
18:00 CET (UTC+1)	Kweuke 50', 90', (yellow card) 73'; Matějovský (yellow card) 71'	Report	Škoda (yellow card) 35'; Glaser (yellow card) 56'; Pašek (yellow card) 69'; Fall (yellow card) 80'	Stadium: Generali Arena; Attendance: 6,752; Referee: Tomáš Kocourek; Assistant referees: Jiří Jiřík, Pavel Peřina

17 November 2012 15	Sparta Prague	1–0	Teplice	Prague
20:15 CET (UTC+1)	Balaj 83'; Hušbauer (yellow card) 90'	Report	Ježdík (yellow card) 90'	Stadium: Generali Arena; Attendance: 6,031; Referee: Jan Jílek; Assistant referees: Patrik Filípek, Michal Urban

25 November 2012 16	Příbram	0–0	Sparta Prague	Příbram
17:00 CET (UTC+1)	Danoski (yellow card) 59'; Mišůn (yellow card) 80'; Hájovský (yellow card) 89'	Report		Stadium: Na Litavce; Attendance: 5,682; Referee: Jiří Jech; Assistant referees: Kryštof Mencl, Petr Blažej

24 February 2013 17	Sparta Prague	4–0	Slovácko	Prague
18:05 CET (UTC+1)	Zápotočný 67'; Kadlec 74', 77'; Bednář 81'; Vácha (yellow card) 87'	Report	Trousil (yellow card) 15'; Mezlík (yellow card) 45'; Kuncl (yellow card) 80'	Stadium: Generali Arena; Attendance: 4,566; Referee: Radek Příhoda; Assistant referees: Martin Wilczek, Jiří Jiřík; Fourth official: Zbyněk Proske

1 March 2013 18	Dynamo České Budějovice	0–2	Sparta Prague	České Budějovice
20:15 CET (UTC+1)	Mkoyan (yellow card) 56'; Machovec (yellow card) 61'	Report	Lafata 49', 53'	Stadium: Stadion Střelecký ostrov Attendance: 3,652; Referee: Jiří Jech; Assistant referees: Pavel Peřina, Jan Paták; Fourth official: Jiří Adam

10 March 2013 19	Sparta Prague	2–2	Jablonec	Prague
20:00 CET (UTC+1)	Hybš (yellow card) 71'; Přikryl 78'; Zápotočný 89'	Report	Čížek 44', 53'; Beneš (yellow card) 69'	Stadium: Generali Arena; Attendance: 9,812; Referee: Pavel Královec; Assistant referees: Roman Slyško, Martin Wilczek; Fourth official: Libor Kovařík

17 March 2013 20	Hradec Králové	1–2	Sparta Prague	Hradec Králové
17:00 CET (UTC+1)	Štěpán 3'; Lindr (yellow card) 9'; Jánošík (yellow card) 100'	Report	Krejčí 45', 81'	Stadium: Všesportovní stadion Attendance: 6,947; Referee: Tomáš Kocourek; Assistant referees: Dušan Pospíšil, Jiří Kříž; Fourth official: Pavel Ochotnický

30 March 2013 21	Sparta Prague	1–0	Viktoria Plzeň	Prague
20:15 CET (UTC+1)	Lafata 68'	Report	Řezník (yellow card) 41'; Darida (yellow card) 77'	Stadium: Generali Arena; Attendance: 19,128; Referee: Wolfgang Stark (Germany); Assistant referees: Jan-Hendrik Salver (Germany), Mike Pickel (Germany); Fourth official: Libor Kovařík (Czech Republic)

6 April 2013 22	Sigma Olomouc	0–3	Sparta Prague	Olomouc
16:30 CEST (UTC+2)	Hořava (yellow card) 32'; Schulmeister (yellow card) 32'; Doležal (yellow card) 75'; Houska (yellow card) 90'	Report	Krejčí 28'; Vidlička (yellow card) 42'; Kadlec 51', 62'; Vácha (yellow card) 84'	Stadium: Andrův stadion Attendance: 7,798; Referee: Pavel Franěk; Assistant referees: Jiří Jiřík, Pavel Peřina; Fourth official: Petr Mikel

13 April 2013 23	Sparta Prague	3–1	Slavia Prague	Prague
19:15 CEST (UTC+2)	Hubáček 20' (o.g.); Kadlec 27'; Krejčí 84'	Report	Skácel (yellow card) 16'; Vošahlík 50', (yellow card) 68'	Stadium: Generali Arena; Attendance: 19,410; Referee: Jiří Jech; Assistant referees: Patrik Filípek, Kryštof Mencl; Fourth official: Radek Příhoda

20 April 2013 24	Baník Ostrava	0–1	Sparta Prague	Ostrava
20:30 CEST (UTC+2)	Frydrych (yellow card) 65'; Droppa (yellow card) 90'	Report	Matějovský (yellow card) 32'; Kweuke 76'	Stadium: Bazaly; Attendance: 14,774; Referee: Libor Kovařík; Assistant referees: Antonín Kordula, Tomáš Kovařík; Fourth official: Miroslav Zelinka

26 April 2013 25	Sparta Prague	2–2	Vysočina Jihlava	Prague
20:15 CEST (UTC+2)	Lafata 74'; Bednář 75'	Report	Jungr (yellow card) 12'; Karlík (yellow card) 30'; Marek (yellow card) 60'; Jarošík 66' (o.g.); Vaculík 67', (yellow card) 82'	Stadium: Generali Arena; Attendance: 11,695; Referee: Jan Jílek; Assistant referees: Zdeněk Dobrovolný, Petr Vysloužil; Fourth official: Pavel Ochotnický

4 May 2013 26	Slovan Liberec	2–0	Sparta Prague	Liberec
16:35 CEST (UTC+2)	Rabušic 8'; Rybalka (yellow card) 41'; Pavelka (yellow card) 43'; Delarge (yellow card) 52'; Štajner 66'; Kováč (yellow card) 73'; Kušnír (yellow card) 90'	Report	Hybš (yellow card) 53'; Jarošík (yellow card) 60'; Bednář (yellow card) 76'; Vidlička (yellow card) 85'	Stadium: Stadion u Nisy; Attendance: 9,215; Referee: Miroslav Zelinka; Assistant referees: Antonín Kordula, Jiří Jiřík; Fourth official: Jiří Jech

12 May 2013 27	Sparta Prague	4–0	Mladá Boleslav	Prague
19:00 CEST (UTC+2)	Lafata 45', 74', 89'; Jarošík 62'	Report	Ševínský (yellow card) 61'	Stadium: Generali Arena; Attendance: 8,152; Referee: Pavel Franěk; Assistant referees: Ivo Nádvorník, Jan Paták; Fourth official: Jiří Jech

22 May 2013 28	Zbrojovka Brno	3–2	Sparta Prague	Brno
20:30 CEST (UTC+2)	Mezlík 39'; Frejlach (yellow card) 43' (red card) 80'; Kroupa 45', (yellow card) 85'; Pašek 48'	Report	Lafata (red card) 53'; Hušbauer 71'; Kadlec 89'; Bednář (yellow card) 90'	Stadium: Městský fotbalový stadion Srbská; Attendance: 8,082; Referee: Jiří Jech; Assistant referees: Tomáš Kovařík, Roman Tacina; Fourth official: Jiří Adam

26 May 2013 29	Teplice	0–3	Sparta Prague	Teplice
18:00 CEST (UTC+2)	Vondrášek (yellow card) 47'	Report	Krátký 22' (o.g.); Kadlec 28'; Hušbauer 60'; Krejčí (yellow card) 76'	Stadium: Na Stínadlech; Attendance: 6,450; Referee: Radek Příhoda; Assistant referees: Martin Wilczek, Radek Kotík; Fourth official: Karel Hrubeš

1 June 2013 30	Sparta Prague	3–0	Dukla Prague	Prague
17:00 CEST (UTC+2)	Vácha 15'; Matějovský (yellow card) 43'; Kadlec 68', 86'	Report	Božić (yellow card) 14'; Berger (yellow card) 69'; Kalouda (yellow card) 89'; Borek (yellow card) 90'	Stadium: Generali Arena; Attendance: 12,355; Referee: Libor Kovařík; Assistant referees: Kryštof Mencl, Patrik Filípek; Fourth official: Jan Jílek

=== Czech Cup ===
31 October 2012 Third round	Viktoria Žižkov	1–1 (3–4 p)	Sparta Prague	Prague
14:30 CET (UTC+1)	Hílek (yellow card) 34'; Hejny (yellow card) 43', (goal) 44'; Besta (yellow card) 89'	Report	Kadeřábek 33'	Stadium: FK Viktoria Stadion
	Penalties
	Čermák (penalty scored); Kiidron (penalty scored); Kotyza (penalty scored)		(penalty scored) Kadeřábek; (penalty scored) Jakubov; (penalty scored) Jirásek; (penalty scored) Skalák
Note: Sparta Prague won 4–3 on penalties.

==== Fourth round ====
29 November 2012 First leg	Vysočina Jihlava	1–1	Sparta Prague	Jihlava
17:00 CET (UTC+1)	Sedláček 4'	Report	Zápotočný 45+1'	Stadium: Stadion v Jiráskově ulici

5 March 2013 Second leg	Sparta Prague	1–1 (2–2 agg.) (3–2 p)	Vysočina Jihlava	Prague
18:00 CET (UTC+1)	Polom (yellow card) 22'; Bednář 34', (yellow card) 53'; Hušbauer (yellow card) 82'	Report	Koloušek 22' (pen.); Josl (yellow card) 36'; Marek (red card) 74'	Stadium: Generali Arena
	Penalties
	Holek (penalty scored); Hušbauer (penalty missed); Kadlec (penalty scored); Vidlička (penalty missed); Lafata (penalty scored)		(penalty missed) Vaculík; (penalty missed) Karlík; (penalty missed) Čvirik; (penalty scored) Kosak; (penalty scored) Tomecek
Note: 2–2 on aggregate. Sparta Prague won 3–2 on penalties.

==== Quarter-finals ====
3 April 2013 First leg	Sigma Olomouc	2–4	Sparta Prague	Olomouc
18:00 CEST (UTC+2)	Janotka (yellow card) 61'; Navrátil 72'; Varadi 87'	Report	Kadlec 60', 66'; Kweuke 64'; Hušbauer 79'; Čermák (yellow card) 88'	Stadium: Andrův stadion

16 April 2013 Second leg	Sparta Prague	4–2 (8–4 agg.)	Sigma Olomouc	Prague
20:15 CEST (UTC+2)	Kadeřábek 7'; Kweuke 49', 70'; Pamić (yellow card) 69'; Jánoš 88'	Report	Navrátil 48'; Škerle 90'	Stadium: Generali Arena
Note: Sparta Prague won 8–4 on aggregate.

==== Semi-finals ====
1 May 2013 First leg	Mladá Boleslav	1–1	Sparta Prague	Mladá Boleslav
16:00 CEST (UTC+2)	Chramosta 73'	Report	Krejčí (yellow card) 19', (goal) 52'; Kadeřábek (yellow card) 62'; Vidlička (yellow card) 63'; Vácha (yellow card) 80'	Stadium: Městský stadion

8 May 2013 Second leg	Sparta Prague	1–2 (2–3 agg.)	Mladá Boleslav	Prague
17:10 CEST (UTC+2)	Jarošík 2', (yellow card) 48'; Kweuke (red card) 47'; Hušbauer (yellow card) 63'; Vácha (yellow card) 63'; Bednář (yellow card) 90+1'; Kadlec (yellow card) 90+2'	Report	Bořil (yellow card) 48', (goal) 59'; Johana (red card) 60'; Chramosta 69'; Nešpor (yellow card) 79'	Stadium: Generali Arena
Note: Mladá Boleslav won 3–2 on aggregate.

=== UEFA Europa League ===
==== Qualifying rounds ====
===== Third qualifying round =====
2 August 2012 First leg	Admira Wacker Mödling (Austria)	0–2	(Czech Republic) Sparta Prague	Maria Enzersdorf, Austria
21:05 CEST (UTC+2)	Schwab (yellow card) 48'; Hosiner (yellow card) 65'	Report	Mevoungou 29' (o.g.); Kweuke 58'; Kadlec (yellow card) 64'	Stadium: Bundesstadion Südstadt; Attendance: 5,000; Referee: Martin Hansson (Sweden); Assistant referees: Fredrik Nilsson (Sweden), Henrik Andren (Sweden); Fourth official: Magnus Ahlsèn (Sweden)

9 August 2012 Second leg	Sparta Prague (Czech Republic)	2–2 (4–2 agg.)	(Austria) Admira Wacker Mödling	Prague, Czech Republic
20:00 CEST (UTC+2)	Kweuke 36', 39'; Kadeřábek (yellow card) 78'	Report	Thürauer 19'; Plassnegger (yellow card) 52'; Sulimani 69'; Schrott (yellow card) 80'	Stadium: Generali Arena; Attendance: 8,732; Referee: Luca Banti (Italy); Assistant referees: Riccardo Di Fiore (Italy), Alessandro Petrella (Italy); Fourth official: Andrea Romeo (Italy)
Note: Sparta Prague won 4–2 on aggregate.

==== Play-off round ====
23 August 2012 First leg	Feyenoord (Netherlands)	2–2	(Czech Republic) Sparta Prague	Rotterdam, Netherlands
20:00 CEST (UTC+2)	Nelom 60'; Achahbar 90+3'	Report	Kweuke (yellow card) 12'; Kadlec 23', 27'; Švejdík (yellow card) 62'; Matějovský (yellow card) 76'; Vaclík (yellow card) 88'	Stadium: De Kuip; Attendance: 34,000; Referee: Peter Rasmussen (Denmark); Assistant referees: Henrik Sønderby (Denmark), Niels Hoeg (Denmark); Fourth official: Lars Christoffersen (Denmark)

30 August 2012 Second leg	Sparta Prague (Czech Republic)	2–0 (4–2 agg.)	(Netherlands) Feyenoord	Prague, Czech Republic
19:30 CEST (UTC+2)	Kadlec 61' (pen.); Matějovský (yellow card) 63'; Jarošík 70'	Report	Immers (yellow card) 1'; Janmaat (yellow card) 85'; Mulder (yellow card) 86'	Stadium: Generali Arena; Attendance: 17,036; Referee: Ivan Bebek (Croatia); Assistant referees: Tomislav Petrović (Croatia), Miro Grgić (Croatia); Fourth official: Domagoj Vučkov (Croatia)
Note: Sparta Prague won 4–2 on aggregate.

==== Group stage ====
Pos	Team	Pld	W	D	L	GF	GA	GD	Pts	Qualification	OL	SPR	ATH	IKS
1	(France) Lyon	6	5	1	0	14	8	+6	16	Advance to knockout phase	—	2–1	2–1	2–0
2	(Czech Republic) Sparta Prague	6	2	3	1	9	6	+3	9	Advance to knockout phase	1–1	—	3–1	3–1
3	(Spain) Athletic Bilbao	6	1	2	3	7	9	−2	5		2–3	0–0	—	1–1
4	(Israel) Ironi Kiryat Shmona	6	0	2	4	6	13	−7	2		3–4	1–1	0–2	—

Source: Soccerway

20 September 2012 1	Lyon (France)	2–1	(Czech Republic) Sparta Prague	Lyon, France
21:05 CEST (UTC+2)	Gonalons (yellow card) 18'; Lacazette (yellow card) 27'; Gomis 59', (yellow card) 61'; Lisandro 62'	Report	Kadeřábek (yellow card) 42'; Krejčí 77'	Stadium: Stade de Gerland; Attendance: 28,052; Referee: Serhiy Boyko (Ukraine); Assistant referees: Oleksandr Korniyko (Ukraine), Volodymyr Volodin (Ukraine); Fourth official: Mykola Levko (Ukraine); Goal-line assistants: Yevheniy Aranovskyi (Ukraine), Anatoliy Abdula (Ukraine)

4 October 2012 2	Sparta Prague (Czech Republic)	3–1	(Spain) Athletic Bilbao	Prague, Czech Republic
19:00 CEST (UTC+2)	Zápotočný 25'; Balaj 40'; Matějovský (yellow card) 52'; Hušbauer 56' (pen.); Pavelka (yellow card) 90+4'	Report	Castillo (yellow card) 56'; Muniain (yellow card) 61'; De Marcos 73'; Herrera (yellow card) 83'; Amorebieta (yellow card) 90+1'	Stadium: Generali Arena; Attendance: 13,752; Referee: Jorge Sousa (Portugal); Assistant referees: Bertino Miranda (Portugal), Ricardo Santos (Portugal); Fourth official: Venâncio Tomé (Portugal); Goal-line assistants: Duarte Gomes (Portugal), Bruno Paixão (Portugal)

25 October 2012 3	Sparta Prague (Czech Republic)	3–1	(Israel) Ironi Kiryat Shmona	Prague, Czech Republic
19:00 CEST (UTC+2)	Krejčí 7'; Kadlec 10', (yellow card) 67'; Švejdík 44'	Report	Gabai (yellow card) 3'; Elisha (yellow card) 50'; Gerzicich (yellow card) 69'; Abuhatzira 76'	Stadium: Generali Arena; Attendance: 10,324; Referee: Danny Makkelie (Netherlands); Assistant referees: Davie Goossens (Netherlands), Patrick Langkamp (Netherlands); Fourth official: Charles Schaap (Netherlands); Goal-line assistants: Kevin Blom (Netherlands), Reinold Wiedemeijer (Netherlands)

8 November 2012 4	Ironi Kiryat Shmona (Israel)	1–1	(Czech Republic) Sparta Prague	Haifa, Israel (Note: The match was played at the Kiryat Eliezer Stadium, Haifa instead of Ironi Kiryat Shmona regular stadium, Municipal Stadium, Kiryat Shmona.)
21:05 IST (UTC+2)	Tasevski 3', (yellow card) 42'	Report	Kweuke 24', (yellow card) 50'	Stadium: Kiryat Eliezer Stadium; Attendance: 850; Referee: Aleksei Kulbakov (Belarus); Assistant referees: Andrei Getikov (Belarus), Dzmitry Zhuk (Belarus); Fourth official: Oleg Maslyanko (Belarus); Goal-line assistants: Denis Scherbakov (Belarus), Sergey Tsinkevich (Belarus)

22 November 2012 5	Sparta Prague (Czech Republic)	1–1	(France) Lyon	Prague, Czech Republic
19:00 CET (UTC+1)	Jarošík (yellow card) 12'; Matějovský (yellow card) 29'; Zápotočný (yellow card) 37'; Hušbauer 53'	Report	Koné (yellow card) 45'; Benzia 46'	Stadium: Generali Arena; Attendance: 17,121; Referee: Anastasios Kakos (Greece); Assistant referees: Christos Akrivos (Greece), Dimitris Tatsis (Greece); Fourth official: Ilias Alexeas (Greece); Goal-line assistants: Athenasios Giachos (Greece), Ilias Spathas (Greece)

6 December 2012 6	Athletic Bilbao (Spain)	0–0	(Czech Republic) Sparta Prague	Bilbao, Spain
21:05 CET (UTC+1)		Report	Zápotočný (yellow card) 26'; Hušbauer (yellow card) 34'; Kadlec (yellow card) 79'	Stadium: San Mamés Stadium; Attendance: 30,424; Referee: Sébastien Delferière (Belgium); Assistant referees: Walter Vromans (Belgium), Yves De Neve (Belgium); Fourth official: Kristof Meers (Belgium); Goal-line assistants: Luc Wouters (Belgium), Jonathan Lardot (Belgium)

==== Knockout phase ====
===== Round of 32 =====
14 February 2013 First leg	Sparta Prague (Czech Republic)	0–1	(England) Chelsea	Prague, Czech Republic
19:00 CET (UTC+1)	Hušbauer (yellow card) 67'	Report	Cahill (yellow card) 41'; Oscar 82'	Stadium: Generali Arena; Attendance: 18,952; Referee: Daniele Orsato (Italy); Assistant referees: Elenito Di Liberatore (Italy), Massimiliano Grilli (Italy); Fourth official: Nicola Nicoletti (Italy); Goal-line assistants: Andrea Gervasoni (Italy), Domenico Celi (Italy)

21 February 2013 Second leg	Chelsea (England)	1–1 (2–1 agg.)	(Czech Republic) Sparta Prague	London, England
20:05 GMT (UTC)	Bertrand (yellow card) 86'; Hazard 90+2'	Report	Lafata 17', (yellow card) 44'; Hybš (yellow card) 55'; Přikryl (yellow card) 84'; Matějovský (yellow card) 87'; Kweuke (yellow card) 90+2'	Stadium: Stamford Bridge; Attendance: 38,642; Referee: Aleksandar Stavrev (Macedonia); Assistant referees: Marjan Kirovski (Macedonia), Dejan Kostadinov (Macedonia); Fourth official: Dusko Miloseski (Macedonia); Goal-line assistants: Dimitar Meckarovski (Macedonia), Dejan Jakimovksi (Macedonia)
Note: Chelsea won 2–1 on aggregate.
