= 2009 UEFA European Under-21 Championship qualification Group 8 =

Football tournament qualifying stage

The teams competing in group 8 of the 2009 UEFA European Under-21 Championship qualifying competition are Belarus, Hungary, Latvia, San Marino and Serbia.

== Standings ==
| Team | Pld | W | D | L | GF | GA | GD | Pts |
|---|---|---|---|---|---|---|---|---|
| Serbia | 8 | 5 | 2 | 1 | 24 | 5 | +19 | 17 |
| Belarus | 8 | 5 | 2 | 1 | 15 | 5 | +10 | 17 |
| Hungary | 8 | 4 | 0 | 4 | 14 | 13 | +1 | 12 |
| Latvia | 8 | 3 | 2 | 3 | 7 | 6 | +1 | 11 |
| San Marino | 8 | 0 | 0 | 8 | 1 | 32 | −31 | 0 |

== Matches ==
2 June 2007
16:00 CEST

| Serbia | 1 – 1 | Latvia |
|---|---|---|
| Marinković 69' | Report | Fertovs 63' |

Karađorđe Stadium, Novi Sad
Attendance: 370
Referee: Bülent Demirlek (Turkey)
2 June 2007
16:30 CEST

| Belarus | 1 – 0 | Hungary |
|---|---|---|
| Kovel 15' | Report |

City Stadium, Borisov
Attendance: 2,950
Referee: Siniša Zrnić (Bosnia and Herzegovina)

6 June 2007
16:30 CEST

| Hungary | 1 – 0 | Latvia |
|---|---|---|
| Feczesin 21' | Report |

Stadium Puskás Ferenc, Budapest
Attendance: 800
Referee: Asaf Kenan (Israel)
6 June 2007
20:30 CEST

| San Marino | 0 – 3 | Belarus |
|---|---|---|
| | Report | Kovel 25'; Kislyak 42' (pen.); Putsila 90' |

Olimpico, Serravalle
Attendance: 250
Referee: José Luis Mengual Prades (Andorra)

22 August 2007
16:30 CEST

| Belarus | 2 – 1 | Latvia |
|---|---|---|
| Kryvets 48'; Kamarowski 78' | Report | Malašenoks 85' |

City Stadium, Borisov
Attendance: 3,500
Referee: Garðar Örn Hinriksson (Iceland)

7 September 2007
20:30 CEST

| San Marino | 1 – 6 | Hungary |
|---|---|---|
| Cibelli 26' | Report | Szalai 10', 70', 74'; Farkas 45'; Ivancsics 59'; Szabó 88' |

Olimpico, Serravalle
Attendance: 500
Referee: Arman Amirkhanyan (Armenia)
8 September 2007
17:00 CEST

| Serbia | 3 – 1 | Belarus |
|---|---|---|
| Petković 21'; Fejsa 61'; Đurđić 87' | Report | Kryvets 90' |

Omladinski Stadium, Belgrade
Attendance: 1,500
Referee: Svein Oddvar Moen (Norway)

11 September 2007
17:00 CEST

| Latvia | 3 – 0 (awarded) | San Marino |
|---|---|---|
| Lukjanovs 29'; Kozlovs 55' | Report |

Skonto stadions, Riga
Attendance: 400
Referee: Petur Reinert (Faroe Islands)
- Match originally ended as 2–0 win for Latvia. Later it was awarded as a 3–0 forfeit win for Latvia as San Marino fielded an ineligible player.
12 September 2007
18:00 CEST

| Hungary | 2 – 1 | Serbia |
|---|---|---|
| Petković 23' (o.g.); Hrepka 33' | Report | Sulejmani 50' |

Szusza Ferenc Stadium, Budapest
Attendance: 850
Referee: Hristo Ristoskov (Bulgaria)

13 October 2007
14:00 CEST

| Serbia | 3 – 0 | San Marino |
|---|---|---|
| Babović 10'; Marinković 30'; Pavlović 62' | Report |

Omladinski Stadium, Belgrade
Attendance: 500
Referee: Babak Guliyev (Azerbaijan)

16 October 2007
18:00 CEST

| Hungary | 0 – 1 | Belarus |
|---|---|---|
| | Report | Kamarowski 42' |

Üllői úti stadion, Budapest
Attendance: 3,000
Referee: Joeri Van De Velde (Belgium)
17 October 2007
17:00 CEST

| Latvia | 0 – 2 | Serbia |
|---|---|---|
| | Report | Đorđević 57', 69' |

Skonto stadions, Riga
Attendance: 300
Referee: Peter Vervecken (Belgium)

16 November 2007
17:30 CEST

| Belarus | 6 – 0 | San Marino |
|---|---|---|
| Kamarowski 14', 45'; Afanasyev 18'; Kovel 42'; Kuchuk 79'; Verkhovtsov 82' | Report |

Vitebsky CSK, Vitebsk
Attendance: 7,257
Referee: Hannes Kaasik (Estonia)
18 November 2007
13:00 CEST

| Latvia | 1 – 0 | Hungary |
|---|---|---|
| Gauračs 65' | Report |

Skonto stadions, Riga
Attendance: 900
Referee: Anthony Buttimer (Ireland)

20 November 2007
17:30 CEST

| Belarus | 1 – 1 | Serbia |
|---|---|---|
| Kryvets 48' | Report | Tošić 58' |

Vitebsky CSK, Vitebsk
Attendance: 8,257
Referee: Paolo Tagliavento (Italy)

26 March 2008
20:30 CEST

| San Marino | 0 – 5 | Serbia |
|---|---|---|
| | Report | Đorđević 13', 90+3'; Petković 27'; Kačar 28'; Babović 50' |

Olimpico, Serravalle
Attendance: 200
Referee: Gediminas Mažeika (Lithuania)

19 August 2008
20:45 CEST

| Hungary | 5 – 0 | San Marino |
|---|---|---|
| Feczesin 30', 51'; Szalai 81', 85'; Filkor 88' (pen.) | Report |

Üllői úti stadion, Budapest
Attendance: 1,156
Referee: Ghenadie Sidenco (Moldova)

5 September 2008
20:30 CEST

| San Marino | 0 – 1 | Latvia |
|---|---|---|
| | Report | Kamešs 52' |

Stadio Olimpico, Serravalle
Attendance: 250
Referee: Garðar Örn Hinriksson (Iceland)
7 September 2008
16:30 CEST

| Serbia | 8 – 0 | Hungary |
|---|---|---|
| Sulejmani 28' (pen.), 56' (pen.); Kačar 40', 64', 86', 87', 89'; Pejčinović 52' | Report |

Omladinski Stadium, Belgrade
Attendance: 1,011
Referee: Richard Liesveld (Netherlands)

9 September 2008
19:00 CEST

| Latvia | 0 – 0 | Belarus |
|---|---|---|
| | Report |

Daugava Stadium, Riga
Attendance: 250
Referee: Jiří Jech (Czech Republic)

== Goalscorers ==
| Pos | Player | Country | Goals |
|---|---|---|---|
| 1 | Gojko Kačar | Serbia | 6 |
| 2 | Ádám Szalai | Hungary | 5 |
| 3 | Dzmitry Kamarowski | Belarus | 4 |
| 3 | Filip Đorđević | Serbia | 4 |
| 5 | Róbert Feczesin | Hungary | 3 |
| 5 | Leonid Kovel | Belarus | 3 |
| 5 | Syarhey Kryvets | Belarus | 3 |
| 5 | Miralem Sulejmani | Serbia | 3 |
| 9 | Stefan Babović | Serbia | 2 |
| 9 | Nebojša Marinković | Serbia | 2 |
| 9 | Nikola Petković | Serbia | 2 |

1 goal

- Belarus: Mikhail Afanasyev, Syarhey Kislyak, Aliaksei Kuchuk, Anton Putsila, Dmitry Verkhovtsov
- Hungary: Balázs Farkas, Attila Filkor, Ádám Hrepka, Gellért Ivancsics, Ádám Szabó
- Latvia: Aleksandrs Fertovs, Edgars Gauračs, Vladimirs Kamešs, Igors Kozlovs, Oļegs Malašenoks, Ivans Lukjanovs
- San Marino: Enrico Cibelli
- Serbia: Nikola Đurđić, Ljubomir Fejsa, Predrag Pavlović, Nemanja Pejčinović, Zoran Tošić

Own goals

- Serbia: Nikola Petković
