= 2012–13 UEFA Europa League group stage =

International football competition

The 2012–13 UEFA Europa League group stage featured 48 teams: the 7 automatic qualifiers, the 31 winners of the play-off round, and the 10 losing teams from the Champions League play-off round.

The teams were drawn into twelve groups of four, and played each other home-and-away in a round-robin format. The top two teams in each group advanced to the round of 32, where they were joined by the eight third-placed teams from the Champions League group stage.

== Teams ==
The draw for the group stage was held on 31 August 2012, 13:00 CEST (UTC+2), at Grimaldi Forum, Monaco.

Teams were seeded into four pots based on their 2012 UEFA club coefficients. The title holders, Atlético Madrid, were automatically seeded into Pot 1.

Key to colours in group tables
Group winners and runners-up advance to the round of 32

Pot 1
Team	Notes	Coeff
(Spain) Atlético Madrid		100.837
(Italy) Internazionale		104.996
(France) Lyon		94.835
(England) Liverpool		90.882
(France) Marseille		85.835
(Portugal) Sporting CP		82.069
(Netherlands) PSV Eindhoven		76.103
(England) Tottenham Hotspur		66.882
(Germany) Bayer Leverkusen		60.037
(France) Bordeaux		58.835
(Netherlands) Twente		57.103
(Germany) VfB Stuttgart		55.037

Pot 2
Team	Notes	Coeff
(Switzerland) Basel		53.360
(Ukraine) Metalist Kharkiv		52.526
(Greece) Panathinaikos		50.920
(Spain) Athletic Bilbao		47.837
(Denmark) Copenhagen		46.505
(Turkey) Fenerbahçe		41.310
(Russia) Rubin Kazan		40.566
(Italy) Napoli		39.996
(Italy) Udinese		38.996
(Belgium) Club Brugge		35.480
(Israel) Hapoel Tel Aviv		31.400
(Germany) Hannover 96		31.037

Pot 3
Team	Notes	Coeff
(Italy) Lazio		29.996
(Romania) Steaua București		26.764
(Czech Republic) Sparta Prague		25.570
(Norway) Rosenborg		20.935
(England) Newcastle United		16.882
(Switzerland) Young Boys		16.860
(Spain) Levante		16.837
(Belgium) Genk		16.480
(Germany) Borussia Mönchengladbach		15.037
(Serbia) Partizan		14.350
(Czech Republic) Viktoria Plzeň		14.070
(Ukraine) Dnipro Dnipropetrovsk		14.026

Pot 4
Team	Notes	Coeff
(Sweden) Helsingborgs IF		12.680
(Portugal) Marítimo		12.569
(Austria) Rapid Wien		12.225
(Portugal) Académica		11.069
(Russia) Anzhi Makhachkala		9.566
(Slovenia) Maribor		6.424
(Sweden) AIK		5.680
(Cyprus) AEL Limassol		5.099
(Israel) Ironi Kiryat Shmona		4.400
(Norway) Molde		3.935
(Hungary) Videoton		3.450
(Azerbaijan) Neftçi		2.241

Notes

1. ^{TH} Europa League title holders (automatic top seed of pot 1)
2. ^{EL-PO} Qualifiers through play-off round
3. ^{CL-CR} Losing teams from the Champions League play-off round (Champions Route)
4. ^{CL-LR} Losing teams from the Champions League play-off round (League Route)

Each group contained one team from each of the four pots, with the restriction that teams from the same national association cannot be drawn against each other. Moreover, the draw was controlled for teams from the same association in order to split the teams evenly into the two sets of groups (A–F, G–L) for maximum television coverage.

The fixtures were decided after the draw. On each matchday, six groups played their matches at 19:00 CET/CEST, while the other six groups played their matches at 21:05 CET/CEST, with the two sets of groups (A–F, G–L) alternating between each matchday. There were other restrictions, e.g., teams from the same city in general did not play at home on the same matchday (UEFA tries to avoid teams from the same city playing at home on the same day or on consecutive days), and Russian teams did not play at home on the last matchday due to cold weather.

== Tiebreakers ==
The teams are ranked according to points (3 points for a win, 1 point for a tie, 0 points for a loss). If two or more teams are equal on points on completion of the group matches, the following criteria are applied to determine the rankings:

1. higher number of points obtained in the group matches played among the teams in question;
2. superior goal difference from the group matches played among the teams in question;
3. higher number of goals scored in the group matches played among the teams in question;
4. higher number of goals scored away from home in the group matches played among the teams in question;
5. If, after applying criteria 1) to 4) to several teams, two teams still have an equal ranking, criteria 1) to 4) are reapplied exclusively to the matches between the two teams in question to determine their final rankings. If this procedure does not lead to a decision, criteria 6) to 8) apply;
6. superior goal difference from all group matches played;
7. higher number of goals scored from all group matches played;
8. higher number of coefficient points accumulated by the club in question, as well as its association, over the previous five seasons.

== Groups ==
The matchdays were 20 September, 4 October, 25 October, 8 November, 22 November, and 6 December 2012.

Times up to 27 October 2012 (matchdays 1–3) are CEST (UTC+2), thereafter (matchdays 4–6) times are CET (UTC+1).

=== Group A ===
Pos	Team	Pld	W	D	L	GF	GA	GD	Pts	Qualification	LIV	ANZ	YB	UDI
1	(England) Liverpool	6	3	1	2	11	9	+2	10 (Note: Head-to-head points: Liverpool 7, Anzhi Makhachkala 6, Young Boys 4.)	Advance to knockout phase	—	1–0	2–2	2–3
2	(Russia) Anzhi Makhachkala	6	3	1	2	7	5	+2	10	Advance to knockout phase	1–0	—	2–0	2–0
3	(Switzerland) Young Boys	6	3	1	2	14	13	+1	10		3–5	3–1	—	3–1
4	(Italy) Udinese	6	1	1	4	7	12	−5	4		0–1	1–1	2–3	—

Source: Soccerway
Notes:
20 September 2012
19:00

Young Boys (Switzerland)	3–5	(England) Liverpool
Nuzzolo 38'; Ojala 53'; Zárate 63'	Report	Ojala 4' (o.g.); Wisdom 40'; Coates 67'; Shelvey 76', 88'

Stade de Suisse, Bern
Attendance: 31,120
Referee: Michael Koukoulakis (Greece)
20 September 2012
19:00

Udinese (Italy)	1–1	(Russia) Anzhi Makhachkala
Di Natale 90+2'	Report	Padelli 45' (o.g.)

Stadio Friuli, Udine
Attendance: 7,220
Referee: Hüseyin Göçek (Turkey)

4 October 2012
18:00

Anzhi Makhachkala (Russia)	2–0	(Switzerland) Young Boys
Eto'o 62' (pen.), 90'	Report

Lokomotiv Stadium, Moscow (Note: Anzhi Makhachkala played their home matches at Lokomotiv Stadium, Moscow instead of their regular stadium, Dynamo Stadium, Makhachkala, due to security issues involving the city of Makhachkala and the autonomous republic of Dagestan.)
Attendance: 8,000
Referee: Felix Zwayer (Germany)
4 October 2012
21:05

Liverpool (England)	2–3	(Italy) Udinese
Shelvey 23'; Suárez 75'	Report	Di Natale 46'; Coates 70' (o.g.); Pasquale 72'

Anfield, Liverpool
Attendance: 40,092
Referee: Stefan Johannesson (Sweden)

25 October 2012
21:05

Liverpool (England)	1–0	(Russia) Anzhi Makhachkala
Downing 53'	Report

Anfield, Liverpool
Attendance: 39,358
Referee: Bas Nijhuis (Netherlands)
25 October 2012
21:05

Young Boys (Switzerland)	3–1	(Italy) Udinese
Bobadilla 4', 71', 81' (pen.)	Report	Coda 74'

Stade de Suisse, Bern
Attendance: 20,143
Referee: Clément Turpin (France)

8 November 2012
18:00

Anzhi Makhachkala (Russia)	1–0	(England) Liverpool
Traoré 45+1'	Report

Lokomotiv Stadium, Moscow
Attendance: 15,000
Referee: David Fernández Borbalán (Spain)
8 November 2012
19:00

Udinese (Italy)	2–3	(Switzerland) Young Boys
Di Natale 47'; Fabbrini 83'	Report	Bobadilla 27'; Farnerud 65'; Nuzzolo 73'

Stadio Friuli, Udine
Attendance: 6,190
Referee: Kristo Tohver (Estonia)

22 November 2012
18:00

Anzhi Makhachkala (Russia)	2–0	(Italy) Udinese
Samba 72'; Eto'o 75'	Report

Lokomotiv Stadium, Moscow
Attendance: 8,556
Referee: Serge Gumienny (Belgium)
22 November 2012
21:05

Liverpool (England)	2–2	(Switzerland) Young Boys
Shelvey 33'; Cole 72'	Report	Bobadilla 52'; Zverotić 88'

Anfield, Liverpool
Attendance: 37,180
Referee: Alon Yefet (Israel)

6 December 2012
19:00

Young Boys (Switzerland)	3–1	(Russia) Anzhi Makhachkala
Zárate 38'; Costanzo 52'; González 90'	Report	Ahmedov 45+2'

Stade de Suisse, Bern
Attendance: 17,132
Referee: Matej Jug (Slovenia)
6 December 2012
19:00

Udinese (Italy)	0–1	(England) Liverpool
	Report	Henderson 23'

Stadio Friuli, Udine
Attendance: 7,650
Referee: Duarte Gomes (Portugal)

=== Group B ===
Pos	Team	Pld	W	D	L	GF	GA	GD	Pts	Qualification	PLZ	ATL	ACA	HTA
1	(Czech Republic) Viktoria Plzeň	6	4	1	1	11	4	+7	13	Advance to knockout phase	—	1–0	3–1	4–0
2	(Spain) Atlético Madrid	6	4	0	2	7	4	+3	12	Advance to knockout phase	1–0	—	2–1	1–0
3	(Portugal) Académica	6	1	2	3	6	9	−3	5		1–1	2–0	—	1–1
4	(Israel) Hapoel Tel Aviv	6	1	1	4	4	11	−7	4		1–2	0–3	2–0	—

Source: Soccerway
20 September 2012
19:00

Hapoel Tel Aviv (Israel)	0–3	(Spain) Atlético Madrid
	Report	C. Rodríguez 37'; Costa 40'; García 63'

Bloomfield Stadium, Tel Aviv
Attendance: 12,000
Referee: Pol van Boekel (Netherlands)
20 September 2012
19:00

Viktoria Plzeň (Czech Republic)	3–1	(Portugal) Académica
Horváth 46'; Ďuriš 58'; Rajtoral 80'	Report	Eduardo 19'

Stadion města Plzně, Plzeň
Attendance: 10,848
Referee: Hannes Kaasik (Estonia)

4 October 2012
21:05

Académica (Portugal)	1–1	(Israel) Hapoel Tel Aviv
Cissé 47'	Report	Damari 90+2'

Estádio Cidade de Coimbra, Coimbra
Attendance: 5,676
Referee: Stephan Studer (Switzerland)
4 October 2012
21:05

Atlético Madrid (Spain)	1–0	(Czech Republic) Viktoria Plzeň
C. Rodríguez 90+3'	Report

Vicente Calderón, Madrid
Attendance: 19,772
Referee: Antony Gautier (France)

25 October 2012
21:05

Atlético Madrid (Spain)	2–1	(Portugal) Académica
Costa 48'; Belözoğlu 67'	Report	Cissé 85'

Vicente Calderón, Madrid
Attendance: 15,749
Referee: Bobby Madden (Scotland)
25 October 2012
21:05

Hapoel Tel Aviv (Israel)	1–2	(Czech Republic) Viktoria Plzeň
Maman 19'	Report	Horváth 45+1'; Rajtoral 55'

Bloomfield Stadium, Tel Aviv
Attendance: 12,248
Referee: Felix Zwayer (Germany)

8 November 2012
19:00

Académica (Portugal)	2–0	(Spain) Atlético Madrid
Eduardo 28', 70' (pen.)	Report

Estádio Cidade de Coimbra, Coimbra
Attendance: 4,652
Referee: Lee Probert (England)
8 November 2012
19:00

Viktoria Plzeň (Czech Republic)	4–0	(Israel) Hapoel Tel Aviv
Kolář 23', 76'; Štípek 39'; Bakoš 84'	Report

Stadion města Plzně, Plzeň
Attendance: 11,389
Referee: Stanislav Todorov (Bulgaria)

22 November 2012
21:05

Atlético Madrid (Spain)	1–0	(Israel) Hapoel Tel Aviv
García 7'	Report

Vicente Calderón, Madrid
Attendance: 13,595
Referee: Martin Hansson (Sweden)
22 November 2012
21:05

Académica (Portugal)	1–1	(Czech Republic) Viktoria Plzeň
Edinho 88' (pen.)	Report	Horváth 57' (pen.)

Estádio Cidade de Coimbra, Coimbra
Attendance: 3,717
Referee: Marcin Borski (Poland)

6 December 2012
19:00

Hapoel Tel Aviv (Israel)	2–0	(Portugal) Académica
Merey 56'; Maman 80'	Report

Bloomfield Stadium, Tel Aviv
Attendance: 10,000
Referee: Aleksei Nikolaev (Russia)
6 December 2012
19:00

Viktoria Plzeň (Czech Republic)	1–0	(Spain) Atlético Madrid
Procházka 26'	Report

Stadion města Plzně, Plzeň
Attendance: 11,067
Referee: Kristinn Jakobsson (Iceland)

=== Group C ===
Pos	Team	Pld	W	D	L	GF	GA	GD	Pts	Qualification	FEN	MGB	OM	AEL
1	(Turkey) Fenerbahçe	6	4	1	1	10	7	+3	13	Advance to knockout phase	—	0–3	2–2	2–0
2	(Germany) Borussia Mönchengladbach	6	3	2	1	11	6	+5	11	Advance to knockout phase	2–4	—	2–0	2–0
3	(France) Marseille	6	1	2	3	9	11	−2	5		0–1	2–2	—	5–1
4	(Cyprus) AEL Limassol	6	1	1	4	4	10	−6	4		0–1	0–0	3–0	—

Source: Soccerway
20 September 2012
19:00

AEL Limassol (Cyprus)	0–0	(Germany) Borussia Mönchengladbach
	Report

GSP Stadium, Nicosia (Note: AEL Limassol played their home matches at GSP Stadium, Nicosia instead of their regular stadium, Tsirion Stadium, Limassol.)
Attendance: 8,500
Referee: Duarte Gomes (Portugal)
20 September 2012
19:00

Fenerbahçe (Turkey)	2–2	(France) Marseille
Erkin 28'; Alex 57'	Report	Valbuena 83'; A. Ayew 90+4'

Şükrü Saracoğlu Stadium, Istanbul
Attendance: 47,000
Referee: Ivan Bebek (Croatia)

4 October 2012
21:05

Marseille (France)	5–1	(Cyprus) AEL Limassol
Fanni 42'; Mendes 61'; Rémy 76', 90+3'; Gignac 90'	Report	Ouon 22'

Stade Vélodrome, Marseille
Attendance: 12,746
Referee: Tony Asumaa (Finland)
4 October 2012
21:05

Borussia Mönchengladbach (Germany)	2–4	(Turkey) Fenerbahçe
L. de Jong 18'; De Camargo 74'	Report	Cristian 25', 87'; Meireles 40'; Kuyt 71'

Borussia-Park, Mönchengladbach
Attendance: 46,297
Referee: Fernando Teixeira Vitienes (Spain)

25 October 2012
21:05

Borussia Mönchengladbach (Germany)	2–0	(France) Marseille
Daems 33' (pen.); Mlapa 67'	Report

Borussia-Park, Mönchengladbach
Attendance: 45,000
Referee: Serge Gumienny (Belgium)
25 October 2012
21:05

AEL Limassol (Cyprus)	0–1	(Turkey) Fenerbahçe
	Report	Korkmaz 72'

GSP Stadium, Nicosia
Attendance: 9,287
Referee: Alexandru Tudor (Romania)

8 November 2012
19:00

Marseille (France)	2–2	(Germany) Borussia Mönchengladbach
Barton 54'; J. Ayew 67'	Report	Hanke 20'; Arango 90+3'

Stade Vélodrome, Marseille
Attendance: 15,775
Referee: Ivan Kružliak (Slovakia)
8 November 2012
19:00

Fenerbahçe (Turkey)	2–0	(Cyprus) AEL Limassol
Kuyt 11'; Sow 41'	Report

Şükrü Saracoğlu Stadium, Istanbul
Attendance: 33,284
Referee: Kristinn Jakobsson (Iceland)

22 November 2012
21:05

Borussia Mönchengladbach (Germany)	2–0	(Cyprus) AEL Limassol
De Camargo 79', 90+1'	Report

Borussia-Park, Mönchengladbach
Attendance: 40,164
Referee: Bobby Madden (Scotland)
22 November 2012
21:05

Marseille (France)	0–1	(Turkey) Fenerbahçe
	Report	İrtegün 39'

Stade Vélodrome, Marseille
Attendance: 14,686
Referee: Martin Atkinson (England)

6 December 2012
19:00

AEL Limassol (Cyprus)	3–0	(France) Marseille
Sá 41'; Edmar 79'; Dickson 82'	Report

GSP Stadium, Nicosia
Attendance: 3,917
Referee: Robert Schörgenhofer (Austria)
6 December 2012
19:00

Fenerbahçe (Turkey)	0–3	(Germany) Borussia Mönchengladbach
	Report	Ciğerci 23'; Hanke 28' (pen.); L. de Jong 79'

Şükrü Saracoğlu Stadium, Istanbul
Attendance: 23,995
Referee: Jorge Sousa (Portugal)

=== Group D ===
Pos	Team	Pld	W	D	L	GF	GA	GD	Pts	Qualification	BOR	NEW	MTM	BRU
1	(France) Bordeaux	6	4	1	1	10	5	+5	13	Advance to knockout phase	—	2–0	1–0	4–0
2	(England) Newcastle United	6	2	3	1	7	5	+2	9	Advance to knockout phase	3–0	—	1–1	1–0
3	(Portugal) Marítimo	6	1	3	2	4	6	−2	6		1–1	0–0	—	2–1
4	(Belgium) Club Brugge	6	1	1	4	6	11	−5	4		1–2	2–2	2–0	—

Source: Soccerway
20 September 2012
19:00

Marítimo (Portugal)	0–0	(England) Newcastle United
	Report

Estádio dos Barreiros, Funchal
Attendance: 4,000
Referee: Robert Schörgenhofer (Austria)
20 September 2012
19:00

Bordeaux (France)	4–0	(Belgium) Club Brugge
Sané 13'; Gouffran 27'; Engels 47' (o.g.); Jussiê 66'	Report

Stade Chaban-Delmas, Bordeaux
Attendance: 13,609
Referee: Vladislav Bezborodov (Russia)

4 October 2012
21:05

Club Brugge (Belgium)	2–0	(Portugal) Marítimo
Bacca 57'; Vleminckx 71'	Report

Jan Breydel Stadium, Bruges
Attendance: 13,393
Referee: Leontios Trattou (Cyprus)
4 October 2012
21:05

Newcastle United (England)	3–0	(France) Bordeaux
Sh. Ameobi 16'; Henrique 40' (o.g.); Cissé 49'	Report

St James' Park, Newcastle upon Tyne
Attendance: 30,987
Referee: Antonio Mateu Lahoz (Spain)

25 October 2012
21:05

Newcastle United (England)	1–0	(Belgium) Club Brugge
Obertan 48'	Report

St James' Park, Newcastle upon Tyne
Attendance: 33,124
Referee: Martin Hansson (Sweden)
25 October 2012
21:05

Marítimo (Portugal)	1–1	(France) Bordeaux
Roberge 36'	Report	Gouffran 30'

Estádio dos Barreiros, Funchal
Attendance: 2,218
Referee: Anastassios Kakos (Greece)

8 November 2012
19:00

Club Brugge (Belgium)	2–2	(England) Newcastle United
Tričkovski 14'; Jørgensen 19'	Report	Anita 41'; Sh. Ameobi 43'

Jan Breydel Stadium, Bruges
Attendance: 18,003
Referee: Luca Banti (Italy)
8 November 2012
19:00

Bordeaux (France)	1–0	(Portugal) Marítimo
Bellion 16'	Report

Stade Chaban-Delmas, Bordeaux
Attendance: 13,392
Referee: Gediminas Mažeika (Lithuania)

22 November 2012
21:05

Newcastle United (England)	1–1	(Portugal) Marítimo
Marveaux 23'	Report	Fidélis 79'

St James' Park, Newcastle upon Tyne
Attendance: 21,632
Referee: Danny Makkelie (Netherlands)
22 November 2012
21:05

Club Brugge (Belgium)	1–2	(France) Bordeaux
Lestienne 86'	Report	Jussiê 3', 40'

Jan Breydel Stadium, Bruges
Attendance: 14,934
Referee: Florian Meyer (Germany)

6 December 2012
19:00

Marítimo (Portugal)	2–1	(Belgium) Club Brugge
Gonçalo 18'; Héldon 87'	Report	Refaelov 85' (pen.)

Estádio dos Barreiros, Funchal
Attendance: 1,819
Referee: Serhiy Boiko (Ukraine)
6 December 2012
19:00

Bordeaux (France)	2–0	(England) Newcastle United
Diabaté 29', 73'	Report

Stade Chaban-Delmas, Bordeaux
Attendance: 19,983
Referee: Menashe Masiah (Israel)

=== Group E ===
Pos	Team	Pld	W	D	L	GF	GA	GD	Pts	Qualification	STE	STU	COP	MOL
1	(Romania) Steaua București	6	3	2	1	9	9	0	11	Advance to knockout phase	—	1–5	1–0	2–0
2	(Germany) VfB Stuttgart	6	2	2	2	9	6	+3	8 (Note: Head-to-head points: VfB Stuttgart 4, Copenhagen 1.)	Advance to knockout phase	2–2	—	0–0	0–1
3	(Denmark) Copenhagen	6	2	2	2	5	6	−1	8		1–1	0–2	—	2–1
4	(Norway) Molde	6	2	0	4	6	8	−2	6		1–2	2–0	1–2	—

Source: Soccerway
Notes:
20 September 2012
19:00

VfB Stuttgart (Germany)	2–2	(Romania) Steaua București
Ibišević 5'; Niedermeier 85'	Report	Chipciu 6'; Rusescu 80' (pen.)

Mercedes-Benz Arena, Stuttgart
Attendance: 17,155
Referee: Serge Gumienny (Belgium)
20 September 2012
19:00

Copenhagen (Denmark)	2–1	(Norway) Molde
Claudemir 20'; Cornelius 74'	Report	Diouf 45+1'

Parken Stadium, Copenhagen
Attendance: 11,633
Referee: Antti Munukka (Finland)

4 October 2012
21:05

Molde (Norway)	2–0	(Germany) VfB Stuttgart
Berget 58'; Chima 88'	Report

Aker Stadion, Molde
Attendance: 5,944
Referee: Kristo Tohver (Estonia)
4 October 2012
21:05

Steaua București (Romania)	1–0	(Denmark) Copenhagen
Sigurðsson 83' (o.g.)	Report

Arena Națională, Bucharest
Attendance: 48,694
Referee: Antonio Damato (Italy)

25 October 2012
21:05

Steaua București (Romania)	2–0	(Norway) Molde
Chiricheș 30'; Rusescu 32'	Report

Arena Națională, Bucharest
Attendance: 43,651
Referee: Laurent Duhamel (France)
25 October 2012
21:05

VfB Stuttgart (Germany)	0–0	(Denmark) Copenhagen
	Report

Mercedes-Benz Arena, Stuttgart
Attendance: 15,300
Referee: Artur Soares Dias (Portugal)

8 November 2012
19:00

Molde (Norway)	1–2	(Romania) Steaua București
Chima 56'	Report	Chipciu 21'; Latovlevici 37'

Aker Stadion, Molde
Attendance: 5,239
Referee: István Vad (Hungary)
8 November 2012
19:00

Copenhagen (Denmark)	0–2	(Germany) VfB Stuttgart
	Report	Ibišević 76'; Harnik 90+2'

Parken Stadium, Copenhagen
Attendance: 24,681
Referee: Craig Thomson (Scotland)

22 November 2012
21:05

Steaua București (Romania)	1–5	(Germany) VfB Stuttgart
Costea 83'	Report	Tasci 5'; Harnik 18'; Sakai 23'; Okazaki 31', 55'

Arena Națională, Bucharest
Attendance: 50,445
Referee: Michael Koukoulakis (Greece)
22 November 2012
21:05

Molde (Norway)	1–2	(Denmark) Copenhagen
Chima 62'	Report	Santin 21' (pen.); Gíslason 76'

Aker Stadion, Molde
Attendance: 5,740
Referee: Michael Oliver (England)

6 December 2012
19:00

VfB Stuttgart (Germany)	0–1	(Norway) Molde
	Report	Angan 45+1'

Mercedes-Benz Arena, Stuttgart
Attendance: 15,550
Referee: Kevin Blom (Netherlands)
6 December 2012
19:00

Copenhagen (Denmark)	1–1	(Romania) Steaua București
Vetokele 87'	Report	Rusescu 72'

Parken Stadium, Copenhagen
Attendance: 15,487
Referee: Hüseyin Göçek (Turkey)

=== Group F ===
Pos	Team	Pld	W	D	L	GF	GA	GD	Pts	Qualification	DNI	NAP	PSV	AIK
1	(Ukraine) Dnipro Dnipropetrovsk	6	5	0	1	16	8	+8	15	Advance to knockout phase	—	3–1	2–0	4–0
2	(Italy) Napoli	6	3	0	3	12	12	0	9	Advance to knockout phase	4–2	—	1–3	4–0
3	(Netherlands) PSV Eindhoven	6	2	1	3	8	7	+1	7		1–2	3–0	—	1–1
4	(Sweden) AIK	6	1	1	4	5	14	−9	4		2–3	1–2	1–0	—

Source: Soccerway
20 September 2012
19:00

Dnipro Dnipropetrovsk (Ukraine)	2–0	(Netherlands) PSV Eindhoven
Matheus 50'; Hutchinson 58' (o.g.)	Report

Dnipro Arena, Dnipropetrovsk
Attendance: 31,003
Referee: Miroslav Zelinka (Czech Republic)
20 September 2012
19:00

Napoli (Italy)	4–0	(Sweden) AIK
Vargas 6', 46', 69'; Džemaili 90+1'	Report

Stadio San Paolo, Naples
Attendance: 35,000
Referee: Clément Turpin (France)

4 October 2012
21:05

AIK (Sweden)	2–3	(Ukraine) Dnipro Dnipropetrovsk
Daníelsson 5'; Goitom 45+1'	Report	Kalinić 41'; Mandzyuk 74'; Seleznyov 83'

Råsunda Stadium, Solna
Attendance: 10,091
Referee: Ivan Kružliak (Slovakia)
4 October 2012
21:05

PSV Eindhoven (Netherlands)	3–0	(Italy) Napoli
Lens 19'; Mertens 41'; Marcelo 52'	Report

Philips Stadion, Eindhoven
Attendance: 18,200
Referee: Alexandru Tudor (Romania)

25 October 2012
21:05

PSV Eindhoven (Netherlands)	1–1	(Sweden) AIK
Lens 80'	Report	Karikari 61'

Philips Stadion, Eindhoven
Attendance: 14,400
Referee: Emir Alečković (Bosnia and Herzegovina)
25 October 2012
21:05

Dnipro Dnipropetrovsk (Ukraine)	3–1	(Italy) Napoli
Fedetskiy 2'; Matheus 42'; Giuliano 64'	Report	Cavani 75' (pen.)

Dnipro Arena, Dnipropetrovsk
Attendance: 30,043
Referee: Hüseyin Göçek (Turkey)

8 November 2012
19:00

AIK (Sweden)	1–0	(Netherlands) PSV Eindhoven
Bangura 12'	Report

Råsunda Stadium, Solna
Attendance: 12,360
Referee: Maksim Layushkin (Russia)
8 November 2012
19:00

Napoli (Italy)	4–2	(Ukraine) Dnipro Dnipropetrovsk
Cavani 7', 77', 88', 90+3'	Report	Fedetskiy 34'; Zozulya 52'

Stadio San Paolo, Naples
Attendance: 18,079
Referee: Alon Yefet (Israel)

22 November 2012
21:05

PSV Eindhoven (Netherlands)	1–2	(Ukraine) Dnipro Dnipropetrovsk
Wijnaldum 18'	Report	Seleznyov 24'; Konoplyanka 74'

Philips Stadion, Eindhoven
Attendance: 27,000
Referee: Carlos Clos Gómez (Spain)
22 November 2012
21:05

AIK (Sweden)	1–2	(Italy) Napoli
Daníelsson 35'	Report	Džemaili 20'; Cavani 90+3' (pen.)

Råsunda Stadium, Solna
Attendance: 28,552
Referee: Ovidiu Haţegan (Romania)

6 December 2012
19:00

Dnipro Dnipropetrovsk (Ukraine)	4–0	(Sweden) AIK
Kalinić 20' (pen.); Zozulya 39', 52'; Kravchenko 86'	Report

Dnipro Arena, Dnipropetrovsk
Attendance: 20,383
Referee: Stephan Studer (Switzerland)
6 December 2012
19:00

Napoli (Italy)	1–3	(Netherlands) PSV Eindhoven
Cavani 18'	Report	Matavž 30', 41', 60'

Stadio San Paolo, Naples
Attendance: 9,434
Referee: Mike Dean (England)

=== Group G ===
Pos	Team	Pld	W	D	L	GF	GA	GD	Pts	Qualification	GNK	BSL	VID	SPO
1	(Belgium) Genk	6	3	3	0	9	4	+5	12	Advance to knockout phase	—	0–0	3–0	2–1
2	(Switzerland) Basel	6	2	3	1	7	4	+3	9	Advance to knockout phase	2–2	—	1–0	3–0
3	(Hungary) Videoton	6	2	0	4	6	8	−2	6		0–1	2–1	—	3–0
4	(Portugal) Sporting CP	6	1	2	3	4	10	−6	5		1–1	0–0	2–1	—

Source: Soccerway
20 September 2012
21:05

Genk (Belgium)	3–0	(Hungary) Videoton
Vossen 22'; Buffel 78'; De Ceulaer 90+2'	Report

Cristal Arena, Genk
Attendance: 10,000
Referee: Laurent Duhamel (France)
20 September 2012
21:05

Sporting CP (Portugal)	0–0	(Switzerland) Basel
	Report

Estádio José Alvalade, Lisbon
Attendance: 22,325
Referee: Alon Yefet (Israel)

4 October 2012
19:00

Basel (Switzerland)	2–2	(Belgium) Genk
Streller 70' (pen.), 85'	Report	De Ceulaer 10'; Vossen 38'

St. Jakob-Park, Basel
Attendance: 14,023
Referee: Bülent Yıldırım (Turkey)
4 October 2012
19:00

Videoton (Hungary)	3–0	(Portugal) Sporting CP
Paulo Vinícius 15'; Oliveira 21'; N. Nikolić 35'	Report

Sóstói Stadion, Székesfehérvár
Attendance: 10,160
Referee: Kristinn Jakobsson (Iceland)

25 October 2012
19:00

Videoton (Hungary)	2–1	(Switzerland) Basel
Schär 2' (o.g.); Caneira 33'	Report	Schär 90+1'

Sóstói Stadion, Székesfehérvár
Attendance: 9,243
Referee: Miroslav Zelinka (Czech Republic)
25 October 2012
19:00

Genk (Belgium)	2–1	(Portugal) Sporting CP
De Ceulaer 25'; Barda 88'	Report	Hamalainen 7' (o.g.)

Cristal Arena, Genk
Attendance: 13,651
Referee: Szymon Marciniak (Poland)

8 November 2012
21:05

Basel (Switzerland)	1–0	(Hungary) Videoton
Streller 80'	Report

St. Jakob-Park, Basel
Attendance: 12,743
Referee: Yevhen Aranovskiy (Ukraine)
8 November 2012
21:05

Sporting CP (Portugal)	1–1	(Belgium) Genk
Van Wolfswinkel 64'	Report	Plet 90+1'

Estádio José Alvalade, Lisbon
Attendance: 18,406
Referee: Stefan Johannesson (Sweden)

22 November 2012
19:00

Videoton (Hungary)	0–1	(Belgium) Genk
	Report	Barda 19'

Sóstói Stadion, Székesfehérvár
Attendance: 10,221
Referee: Liran Liany (Israel)
22 November 2012
19:00

Basel (Switzerland)	3–0	(Portugal) Sporting CP
Schär 23'; Stocker 66'; D. Degen 71'	Report

St. Jakob-Park, Basel
Attendance: 15,566
Referee: Paolo Valeri (Italy)

6 December 2012
21:05

Genk (Belgium)	0–0	(Switzerland) Basel
	Report

Cristal Arena, Genk
Attendance: 11,974
Referee: Mark Clattenburg (England)
7 December 2012 (Note: The Sporting CP v Videoton match, originally scheduled to take place on 6 December 2012, 21:05 (20:05 UTC+0), was postponed due to a waterlogged pitch. It was rescheduled to take place on 7 December 2012, 21:05 (20:05 UTC+0).)
21:05

Sporting CP (Portugal)	2–1	(Hungary) Videoton
Labyad 65'; Viola 82'	Report	Sándor 80' (pen.)

Estádio José Alvalade, Lisbon
Attendance: 8,080
Referee: Michael Koukoulakis (Greece)

=== Group H ===
Pos	Team	Pld	W	D	L	GF	GA	GD	Pts	Qualification	RUB	INT	PAR	NEF
1	(Russia) Rubin Kazan	6	4	2	0	10	3	+7	14	Advance to knockout phase	—	3–0	2–0	1–0
2	(Italy) Internazionale	6	3	2	1	11	9	+2	11	Advance to knockout phase	2–2	—	1–0	2–2
3	(Serbia) Partizan	6	0	3	3	3	8	−5	3 (Note: Tied on head-to-head points (2) and head-to-head goal difference (0). Head-to-head away goals: Partizan 1, Neftçi 0.)		1–1	1–3	—	0–0
4	(Azerbaijan) Neftçi	6	0	3	3	4	8	−4	3		0–1	1–3	1–1	—

Source: Soccerway
Notes:
20 September 2012
21:05

Internazionale (Italy)	2–2	(Russia) Rubin Kazan
Livaja 39'; Nagatomo 90+2'	Report	Ryazantsev 17'; Rondón 84'

San Siro, Milan
Attendance: 28,472
Referee: Deniz Aytekin (Germany)
20 September 2012
21:05

Partizan (Serbia)	0–0	(Azerbaijan) Neftçi
	Report

Partizan Stadium, Belgrade
Attendance: 18,000
Referee: Libor Kovařík (Czech Republic)

4 October 2012
18:00

Neftçi (Azerbaijan)	1–3	(Italy) Internazionale
Canales 53'	Report	Coutinho 10'; Obi 30'; Livaja 42'

Tofiq Bahramov Stadium, Baku (Note: Neftçi played their home matches at Tofiq Bahramov Stadium, Baku instead of their regular stadium, Ismat Gayibov Stadium, Baku.)
Attendance: 31,400
Referee: Kevin Blom (Netherlands)
4 October 2012
18:00

Rubin Kazan (Russia)	2–0	(Serbia) Partizan
Karadeniz 45'; Ryazantsev 48'	Report

Central Stadium, Kazan
Attendance: 10,443
Referee: Anastassios Kakos (Greece)

25 October 2012
18:00

Rubin Kazan (Russia)	1–0	(Azerbaijan) Neftçi
Kasaev 16'	Report

Central Stadium, Kazan
Attendance: 6,084
Referee: Kenn Hansen (Denmark)
25 October 2012
19:00

Internazionale (Italy)	1–0	(Serbia) Partizan
Palacio 88'	Report

San Siro, Milan
Attendance: 18,626
Referee: Liran Liany (Israel)

8 November 2012
18:00

Neftçi (Azerbaijan)	0–1	(Russia) Rubin Kazan
	Report	Dyadyun 16'

Tofiq Bahramov Stadium, Baku
Attendance: 15,832
Referee: Jorge Sousa (Portugal)
8 November 2012
21:05

Partizan (Serbia)	1–3	(Italy) Internazionale
Tomić 90+1'	Report	Palacio 51', 75'; Guarín 87'

Partizan Stadium, Belgrade
Attendance: 17,186
Referee: Duarte Gomes (Portugal)

22 November 2012
18:00

Rubin Kazan (Russia)	3–0	(Italy) Internazionale
Karadeniz 2'; Rondón 85', 90+2'	Report

Central Stadium, Kazan
Attendance: 12,348
Referee: Tommy Skjerven (Norway)
22 November 2012
18:00

Neftçi (Azerbaijan)	1–1	(Serbia) Partizan
Flavinho 10'	Report	Mitrović 67'

Tofiq Bahramov Stadium, Baku
Attendance: 8,992
Referee: Simon Lee Evans (Wales)

6 December 2012
21:05

Internazionale (Italy)	2–2	(Azerbaijan) Neftçi
Livaja 9', 54'	Report	Sadiqov 52'; Canales 89'

San Siro, Milan
Attendance: 6,150
Referee: Emir Alečković (Bosnia and Herzegovina)
6 December 2012
21:05

Partizan (Serbia)	1–1	(Russia) Rubin Kazan
S. Marković 53'	Report	Rondón 59'

Partizan Stadium, Belgrade
Attendance: 5,233
Referee: Martin Hansson (Sweden)

=== Group I ===
Pos	Team	Pld	W	D	L	GF	GA	GD	Pts	Qualification	OL	SPR	ATH	IKS
1	(France) Lyon	6	5	1	0	14	8	+6	16	Advance to knockout phase	—	2–1	2–1	2–0
2	(Czech Republic) Sparta Prague	6	2	3	1	9	6	+3	9	Advance to knockout phase	1–1	—	3–1	3–1
3	(Spain) Athletic Bilbao	6	1	2	3	7	9	−2	5		2–3	0–0	—	1–1
4	(Israel) Ironi Kiryat Shmona	6	0	2	4	6	13	−7	2		3–4	1–1	0–2	—

Source: Soccerway
20 September 2012
21:05

Lyon (France)	2–1	(Czech Republic) Sparta Prague
Gomis 59'; López 62'	Report	Krejčí 77'

Stade de Gerland, Lyon
Attendance: 41,842
Referee: Serhiy Boiko (Ukraine)
20 September 2012
21:05

Athletic Bilbao (Spain)	1–1	(Israel) Ironi Kiryat Shmona
Susaeta 40'	Report	Rochet 14'

San Mamés, Bilbao
Attendance: 30,000
Referee: Simon Lee Evans (Wales)

4 October 2012
19:00

Ironi Kiryat Shmona (Israel)	3–4	(France) Lyon
Abuhatzira 7', 66' (pen.); Levi 51'	Report	Fofana 17', 90+2'; Monzón 22'; Réveillère 31'

Kiryat Eliezer Stadium, Haifa (Note: Ironi Kiryat Shmona played their home matches at Kiryat Eliezer Stadium, Haifa instead of their regular stadium, Municipal Stadium, Kiryat Shmona.)
Attendance: 2,500
Referee: Artur Soares Dias (Portugal)
4 October 2012
19:00

Sparta Prague (Czech Republic)	3–1	(Spain) Athletic Bilbao
Zápotočný 25'; Balaj 40'; Hušbauer 56' (pen.)	Report	De Marcos 73'

Generali Arena, Prague
Attendance: 13,752
Referee: Jorge Sousa (Portugal)

25 October 2012
19:00

Sparta Prague (Czech Republic)	3–1	(Israel) Ironi Kiryat Shmona
Krejčí 7'; V. Kadlec 10'; Švejdík 44'	Report	Abuhatzira 76'

Generali Arena, Prague
Attendance: 10,324
Referee: Danny Makkelie (Netherlands)
25 October 2012
19:00

Lyon (France)	2–1	(Spain) Athletic Bilbao
López 54'; Briand 86'	Report	Ibai 79'

Stade de Gerland, Lyon
Attendance: 30,587
Referee: Andre Marriner (England)

8 November 2012
21:05

Ironi Kiryat Shmona (Israel)	1–1	(Czech Republic) Sparta Prague
Tasevski 3'	Report	Kweuke 24'

Kiryat Eliezer Stadium, Haifa
Attendance: 850
Referee: Aleksei Kulbakov (Belarus)
8 November 2012
21:05

Athletic Bilbao (Spain)	2–3	(France) Lyon
Herrera 48'; Aduriz 55' (pen.)	Report	Gomis 22'; Gourcuff 45+1'; Lacazette 63'

San Mamés, Bilbao
Attendance: 24,465
Referee: Pol van Boekel (Netherlands)

22 November 2012
19:00

Sparta Prague (Czech Republic)	1–1	(France) Lyon
Hušbauer 53'	Report	Benzia 46'

Generali Arena, Prague
Attendance: 17,121
Referee: Anastassios Kakos (Greece)
28 November 2012 (Note: The Ironi Kiryat Shmona v Athletic Bilbao match, originally scheduled to take place on 22 November 2012, 19:00 (20:00 UTC+2), was postponed by UEFA on 21 November due to the ongoing security situation in Israel. It was rescheduled to take place on 28 November 2012, 19:00 (20:00 UTC+2).)
19:00

Ironi Kiryat Shmona (Israel)	0–2	(Spain) Athletic Bilbao
	Report	Llorente 34'; Toquero 76'

Kiryat Eliezer Stadium, Haifa
Attendance: 150
Referee: Rene Eisner (Austria)

6 December 2012
21:05

Lyon (France)	2–0	(Israel) Ironi Kiryat Shmona
Sarr 15'; Benzia 58'	Report

Stade de Gerland, Lyon
Attendance: 29,087
Referee: Halis Özkahya (Turkey)
6 December 2012
21:05

Athletic Bilbao (Spain)	0–0	(Czech Republic) Sparta Prague
	Report

San Mamés, Bilbao
Attendance: 30,424
Referee: Sébastien Delferiere (Belgium)

=== Group J ===
Pos	Team	Pld	W	D	L	GF	GA	GD	Pts	Qualification	LAZ	TOT	PAN	MRB
1	(Italy) Lazio	6	3	3	0	9	2	+7	12	Advance to knockout phase	—	0–0	3–0	1–0
2	(England) Tottenham Hotspur	6	2	4	0	8	4	+4	10	Advance to knockout phase	0–0	—	3–1	3–1
3	(Greece) Panathinaikos	6	1	2	3	4	11	−7	5		1–1	1–1	—	1–0
4	(Slovenia) Maribor	6	1	1	4	6	10	−4	4		1–4	1–1	3–0	—

Source: Soccerway
20 September 2012
21:05

Maribor (Slovenia)	3–0	(Greece) Panathinaikos
Berić 25'; Ibraimi 62'; Tavares 88' (pen.)	Report

Ljudski vrt, Maribor
Attendance: 11,000
Referee: Alan Kelly (Republic of Ireland)
20 September 2012
21:05

Tottenham Hotspur (England)	0–0	(Italy) Lazio
	Report

White Hart Lane, London
Attendance: 25,030
Referee: Ovidiu Haţegan (Romania)

4 October 2012
19:00

Lazio (Italy)	1–0	(Slovenia) Maribor
Ederson 62'	Report

Stadio Olimpico, Rome
Attendance: 9,994
Referee: Szymon Marciniak (Poland)
4 October 2012
19:00

Panathinaikos (Greece)	1–1	(England) Tottenham Hotspur
Toché 77'	Report	Dawson 35'

Olympic Stadium, Athens
Attendance: 17,361
Referee: Florian Meyer (Germany)

25 October 2012
19:00

Panathinaikos (Greece)	1–1	(Italy) Lazio
Toché 90+1'	Report	Seitaridis 25' (o.g.)

Olympic Stadium, Athens
Attendance: 13,008
Referee: Carlos Clos Gómez (Spain)
25 October 2012
19:00

Maribor (Slovenia)	1–1	(England) Tottenham Hotspur
Berić 42'	Report	Sigurðsson 58'

Ljudski vrt, Maribor
Attendance: 10,049
Referee: Sergei Karasev (Russia)

8 November 2012
21:05

Lazio (Italy)	3–0	(Greece) Panathinaikos
Kozák 23', 40'; Floccari 59'	Report

Stadio Olimpico, Rome
Attendance: 9,068
Referee: Robert Schörgenhofer (Austria)
8 November 2012
21:05

Tottenham Hotspur (England)	3–1	(Slovenia) Maribor
Defoe 22', 49', 77'	Report	Berić 40'

White Hart Lane, London
Attendance: 27,089
Referee: Antti Munukka (Finland)

22 November 2012
19:00

Panathinaikos (Greece)	1–0	(Slovenia) Maribor
Vitolo 67' (pen.)	Report

Olympic Stadium, Athens
Attendance: 9,390
Referee: Laurent Duhamel (France)
22 November 2012
19:00

Lazio (Italy)	0–0	(England) Tottenham Hotspur
	Report

Stadio Olimpico, Rome
Attendance: 23,318
Referee: Fernando Teixeira Vitienes (Spain)

6 December 2012
21:05

Maribor (Slovenia)	1–4	(Italy) Lazio
Tavares 84'	Report	Kozák 16'; Radu 32'; Floccari 38', 51'

Ljudski vrt, Maribor
Attendance: 10,300
Referee: István Vad (Hungary)
6 December 2012
21:05

Tottenham Hotspur (England)	3–1	(Greece) Panathinaikos
Adebayor 28'; Karnezis 76' (o.g.); Defoe 82'	Report	Zeca 54'

White Hart Lane, London
Attendance: 32,554
Referee: Paweł Gil (Poland)

=== Group K ===
Pos	Team	Pld	W	D	L	GF	GA	GD	Pts	Qualification	MET	BAY	ROS	RAP
1	(Ukraine) Metalist Kharkiv	6	4	1	1	9	3	+6	13 (Note: Head-to-head points: Metalist Kharkiv 4, Bayer Leverkusen 1.)	Advance to knockout phase	—	2–0	3–1	2–0
2	(Germany) Bayer Leverkusen	6	4	1	1	9	2	+7	13	Advance to knockout phase	0–0	—	1–0	3–0
3	(Norway) Rosenborg	6	2	0	4	7	10	−3	6		1–2	0–1	—	3–2
4	(Austria) Rapid Wien	6	1	0	5	4	14	−10	3		1–0	0–4	1–2	—

Source: Soccerway
Notes:
20 September 2012
21:05

Rapid Wien (Austria)	1–2	(Norway) Rosenborg
Katzer 66'	Report	Elyounoussi 18'; Dorsin 60'

Ernst-Happel-Stadion, Vienna (Note: Rapid Wien played their home matches at Ernst-Happel-Stadion, Vienna instead of their regular stadium, Gerhard-Hanappi-Stadion, Vienna.)
Attendance: 0 (Note: The Rapid Wien v Rosenborg match was played behind closed doors due to the punishment handed to Rapid Wien by UEFA following incidents at their play-off round first leg against PAOK on 23 August 2012.)
Referee: Stanislav Todorov (Bulgaria)
20 September 2012
21:05

Bayer Leverkusen (Germany)	0–0	(Ukraine) Metalist Kharkiv
	Report

BayArena, Leverkusen
Attendance: 15,322
Referee: Martin Hansson (Sweden)

4 October 2012
19:00

Metalist Kharkiv (Ukraine)	2–0	(Austria) Rapid Wien
Edmar 66'; Cleiton Xavier 80'	Report

Metalist Stadium, Kharkiv
Attendance: 40,003
Referee: Menashe Masiah (Israel)
4 October 2012
19:00

Rosenborg (Norway)	0–1	(Germany) Bayer Leverkusen
	Report	Kießling 76'

Lerkendal Stadion, Trondheim
Attendance: 12,587
Referee: Michael Oliver (England)

25 October 2012
19:00

Rosenborg (Norway)	1–2	(Ukraine) Metalist Kharkiv
Elyounoussi 46'	Report	Marlos 81'; Cleiton Xavier 89'

Lerkendal Stadion, Trondheim
Attendance: 10,935
Referee: Olegário Benquerença (Portugal)
25 October 2012
19:00

Rapid Wien (Austria)	0–4	(Germany) Bayer Leverkusen
	Report	Wollscheid 37'; Castro 56', 90+2'; Bellarabi 59'

Ernst-Happel-Stadion, Vienna
Attendance: 43,200
Referee: Fernando Teixeira Vitienes (Spain)

8 November 2012
21:05

Metalist Kharkiv (Ukraine)	3–1	(Norway) Rosenborg
Taison 4'; Cleiton Xavier 70'; Torres 90+3'	Report	Dočkal 42'

Metalist Stadium, Kharkiv
Attendance: 34,235
Referee: Matej Jug (Slovenia)
8 November 2012
21:05

Bayer Leverkusen (Germany)	3–0	(Austria) Rapid Wien
Hegeler 4'; Schürrle 53'; Friedrich 66'	Report

BayArena, Leverkusen
Attendance: 19,842
Referee: Libor Kovařík (Czech Republic)

22 November 2012
19:00

Rosenborg (Norway)	3–2	(Austria) Rapid Wien
Chibuike 28'; Elyounoussi 76'; Prica 79'	Report	Schrammel 53'; Boyd 66'

Lerkendal Stadion, Trondheim
Attendance: 8,320
Referee: Gediminas Mažeika (Lithuania)
22 November 2012
19:00

Metalist Kharkiv (Ukraine)	2–0	(Germany) Bayer Leverkusen
Cristaldo 46'; Cleiton Xavier 85'	Report

Metalist Stadium, Kharkiv
Attendance: 39,218
Referee: Cristian Balaj (Romania)

6 December 2012
21:05

Rapid Wien (Austria)	1–0	(Ukraine) Metalist Kharkiv
Alar 13'	Report

Ernst-Happel-Stadion, Vienna
Attendance: 29,400
Referee: Hannes Kaasik (Estonia)
6 December 2012
21:05

Bayer Leverkusen (Germany)	1–0	(Norway) Rosenborg
Riedel 65'	Report

BayArena, Leverkusen
Attendance: 10,513
Referee: Leontios Trattou (Cyprus)

=== Group L ===
Pos	Team	Pld	W	D	L	GF	GA	GD	Pts	Qualification	HAN	LEV	HEL	TWE
1	(Germany) Hannover 96	6	3	3	0	11	8	+3	12	Advance to knockout phase	—	2–1	3–2	0–0
2	(Spain) Levante	6	3	2	1	10	5	+5	11	Advance to knockout phase	2–2	—	1–0	3–0
3	(Sweden) Helsingborgs IF	6	1	1	4	9	12	−3	4 (Note: Head-to-head points: Helsingborg 4, Twente 1.)		1–2	1–3	—	2–2
4	(Netherlands) Twente	6	0	4	2	5	10	−5	4		2–2	0–0	1–3	—

Source: Soccerway
Notes:
20 September 2012
21:05

Levante (Spain)	1–0	(Sweden) Helsingborgs IF
Juanfran 40'	Report

Estadi Ciutat de València, Valencia
Attendance: 14,000
Referee: Aleksei Kulbakov (Belarus)
20 September 2012
21:05

Twente (Netherlands)	2–2	(Germany) Hannover 96
Janssen 7'; Chadli 54'	Report	Sobiech 67'; Wisgerhof 73' (o.g.)

De Grolsch Veste, Enschede
Attendance: 22,500
Referee: Mike Dean (England)

4 October 2012
19:00

Hannover 96 (Germany)	2–1	(Spain) Levante
Huszti 21' (pen.); Ya Konan 49'	Report	Míchel 10' (pen.)

AWD-Arena, Hanover
Attendance: 34,600
Referee: Liran Liany (Israel)
4 October 2012
19:00

Helsingborgs IF (Sweden)	2–2	(Netherlands) Twente
Đurđić 7', 43'	Report	Bengtsson 74'; Douglas 88'

Olympia, Helsingborg
Attendance: 5,578
Referee: Bobby Madden (Scotland)

25 October 2012
19:00

Helsingborgs IF (Sweden)	1–2	(Germany) Hannover 96
Álvaro 90+1'	Report	Diouf 12'; Ya Konan 90+3'

Olympia, Helsingborg
Attendance: 8,338
Referee: Stephan Studer (Switzerland)
25 October 2012
19:00

Levante (Spain)	3–0	(Netherlands) Twente
Míchel 59' (pen.); Ríos 78', 88'	Report

Estadi Ciutat de València, Valencia
Attendance: 8,565
Referee: Vladislav Bezborodov (Russia)

8 November 2012
21:05

Hannover 96 (Germany)	3–2	(Sweden) Helsingborgs IF
Diouf 3', 50'; Huszti 90+1' (pen.)	Report	Đurđić 59'; Bedoya 67'

AWD-Arena, Hanover
Attendance: 33,200
Referee: Fredy Fautrel (France)
8 November 2012
21:05

Twente (Netherlands)	0–0	(Spain) Levante
	Report

De Grolsch Veste, Enschede
Attendance: 19,500
Referee: Tony Chapron (France)

22 November 2012
19:00

Helsingborgs IF (Sweden)	1–3	(Spain) Levante
Sørum 89'	Report	Ángel 8'; Diop 37'; Iborra 81'

Olympia, Helsingborg
Attendance: 4,453
Referee: Alan Kelly (Republic of Ireland)
22 November 2012
19:00

Hannover 96 (Germany)	0–0	(Netherlands) Twente
	Report

AWD-Arena, Hanover
Attendance: 35,800
Referee: Aleksei Kulbakov (Belarus)

6 December 2012
21:05

Levante (Spain)	2–2	(Germany) Hannover 96
Ángel 49'; Iborra 90+4'	Report	Stindl 18'; Ya Konan 26'

Estadi Ciutat de València, Valencia
Attendance: 14,420
Referee: Alexandru Tudor (Romania)
6 December 2012
21:05

Twente (Netherlands)	1–3	(Sweden) Helsingborgs IF
Tadić 74'	Report	Đurđić 6'; Bedoya 21'; Sørum 67'

De Grolsch Veste, Enschede
Attendance: 15,000
Referee: Ilias Spathas (Greece)
