= Kotyza =

Kotyza (Czech feminine: Kotyzová) is a surname. Notable people include:

- Carlie Kotyza-Witthuhn (born 1986/87), American politician
- Daniel Kotyza (born 2000), Czech athlete
- David Kotyza (born 1967), Czech tennis coach
- Martin Kotyza (born 1984), Czech footballer
