= Kosak =

Kosak is a surname.

== People ==
- Artsyom Kosak (born 1977), Belarusian footballer and coach
- Carl Constantine Kosak (born 1934), American author
- Jan Kosak (born 1992), Czech footballer
- Karin Kosak (born 1979), Austrian dressage rider
- Vladimir Košak (1908–1947), Croatian economist and politician

== See also ==
- Kosac
