= Nikola Đurđić =

Serbian footballer (born 1986)

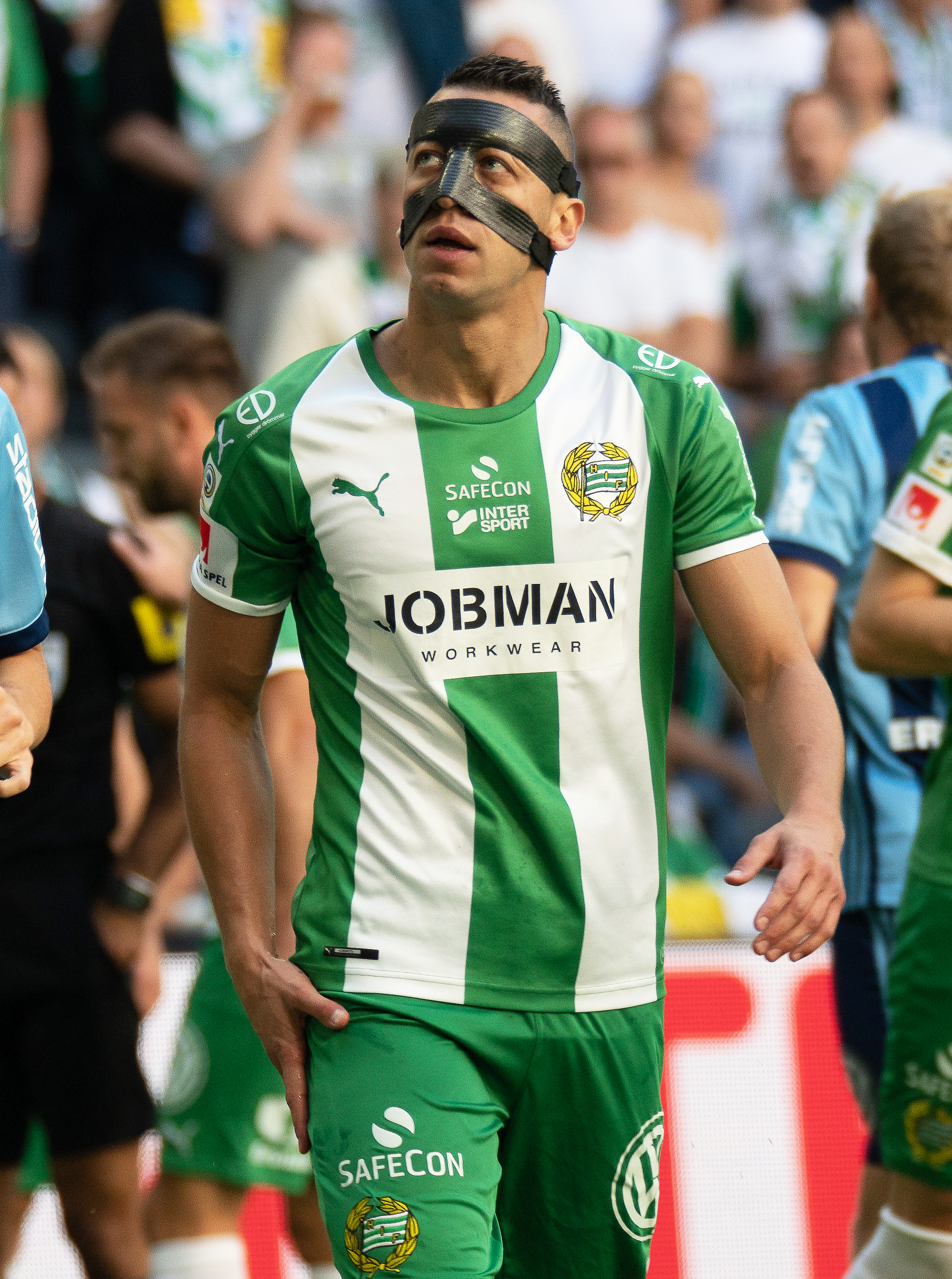
- Đurđić with Hammarby IF in 2018

Personal information
- Date of birth: 1 April 1986 (age 40)
- Place of birth: Pirot, SR Serbia, Yugoslavia
- Height: 1.86 m (6 ft 1 in)
- Position: Striker

Youth career
- Radnički Pirot

Senior career*
Years	Team	Apps	(Gls)
2004–2006	Radnički Pirot	30	(6)
2006–2008	Voždovac	63	(15)
2009–2012	Haugesund	97	(46)
2012	→ Helsingborg (loan)	11	(10)
2013–2014	Greuther Fürth	30	(9)
2014–2016	FC Augsburg	16	(1)
2015	→ Malmö FF (loan)	12	(5)
2016	→ Fortuna Düsseldorf (loan)	12	(2)
2016	Partizan	13	(1)
2017–2018	Randers	26	(3)
2018–2019	Hammarby IF	54	(26)
2020–2021	Chengdu Better City	14	(2)
2021	→ Zhejiang (loan)	8	(0)
2021–2023	Degerfors IF	30	(4)
Total		416	(130)

International career
2007	Serbia U21	5	(1)
2013	Serbia	1	(0)
- * Club domestic league appearances and goals as of 7 May 2023

Nikola Đurđić (Serbian Cyrillic: Никола Ђурђић; born 1 April 1986) is a Serbian professional footballer who plays as a striker or as an attacking midfielder.

== Club career ==
=== Early years ===
Đurđić started out at his hometown club Radnički Pirot, making his senior debut in 2004. He subsequently moved to Voždovac in the summer of 2006. In his debut season with the Zmajevi, Đurđić was the club's top scorer with 10 league goals, as they suffered relegation from the top flight of Serbian football. He spent another year and a half at the club, before moving abroad in the 2009 winter transfer window.

=== Haugesund ===
In March 2009, Đurđić joined Norwegian side Haugesund on a three-year deal. He scored 10 league goals in his first season at the club, as they gained promotion to the Tippeligaen. In the following three seasons, Đurđić scored 36 league goals (12 each season). He scored a total of 57 goals during his tenure at Haugesund (including 11 cup goals).

==== Loan to Helsingborg ====
In August 2012, Đurđić was loaned to Swedish club Helsingborg. He joined them ahead of their 2012–13 UEFA Champions League qualifying tie against Celtic. The original contract was to last until 15 January 2013 and included an option to purchase if desired. As well as signing this loan contract, Đurđić also extended his contract with Haugesund lasting until the end of 2014.

Until the end of the 2012 season, Đurđić scored 10 league goals from 11 appearances for Helsingborg. He also netted four goals in Group L of the 2012–13 UEFA Europa League, as the club finished in third place. On 4 October 2012, Đurđić scored a brace in a 2–2 home draw with Twente. He subsequently scored his side's first goal in a 2–3 away loss against Hannover 96. On 6 December 2012, Đurđić netted the opener in his team's 3–1 away win over Twente.

=== SpVgg Greuther Fürth ===
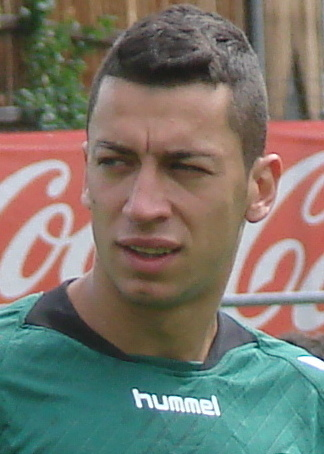
Đurđić with Greuther Fürth in 2013

On 1 January 2013, Đurđić officially moved to SpVgg Greuther Fürth on a three-and-a-half-year deal. He made his debut for the club on 26 January 2013, coming on as a substitute in a 0–3 home league loss to Mainz 05. On 2 February 2013, in his second Bundesliga game, Đurđić provided an assist to Felix Klaus and also scored an injury time winner away at Schalke 04. He netted a total of five league goals until the end of the 2012–13 season, as the club finished bottom of the table and suffered relegation to the 2. Bundesliga.

After scoring a goal in the team's opener of the 2013–14 campaign, Đurđić torn his ACL in the league's third round, causing him to miss the majority of the season. He made his return on 2 March 2014, coming on as a substitute in a 3–2 home league win over FSV Frankfurt.

=== Augsburg ===
On 3 July 2014, it was announced that Đurđić joined FC Augsburg on a three-year deal. He made his first official appearance for the club in 0–1 DFB-Pokal away loss to 1. FC Magdeburg on 17 August 2014. Six days later, Đurđić made his league debut for Augsburg in a 0–2 away loss against 1899 Hoffenheim. He scored his first goal for the club in a 2–1 away league win over 1. FC Köln on 6 December 2014.

==== Loan to Malmö FF ====
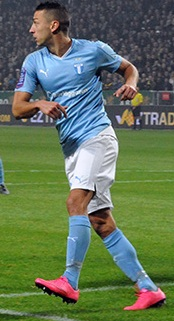
Đurđić playing for Malmö FF in 2015

On 17 July 2015, Đurđić went on a six-month loan to Malmö FF. He made his debut for the club on 25 July 2015, scoring a 2nd-minute goal in a 3–0 home league win over Sundsvall. On 1 August 2015, Đurđić netted both of his team's goals in a 2–2 away league draw against Åtvidaberg. He then scored the opening goal of a 3–0 victory over Red Bull Salzburg in the second leg of the 2015–16 UEFA Champions League third qualifying round. The club eventually reached the group stage of the competition. On 15 September 2015, Đurđić made his UEFA Champions League debut, playing the full 90 minutes in a 2–0 away loss to Paris Saint-Germain at Parc des Princes. He also failed to convert a penalty in a 1–0 home win over Shakhtar Donetsk on 21 October 2015.

==== Loan to Fortuna Düsseldorf ====
On 1 February 2016, Đurđić was loaned to Fortuna Düsseldorf until the end of the 2015–16 season. He scored two goals from 12 appearances in the process, as the club avoided relegation from the 2. Bundesliga.

=== Partizan ===
On 21 June 2016, Đurđić was transferred to Serbian club Partizan. He signed a two-year deal and was given the number 40 shirt.

=== Randers ===
In January 2017, Đurđić moved to Danish club Randers. His debut at the club would be postponed due to an injury, that kept him sidelined for two months. Đurđić made his first competitive appearance in a 0–1 loss against Odense BK on 18 April.

=== Hammarby ===
==== 2018 ====
On 15 March 2018, Đurđić joined Hammarby IF, the third Swedish club in his career. He signed a one-year contract (with an option for two further) with the Allsvenskan side. Đurđić had a flying start to his stint at the club, scoring 6 goals in 10 games as Hammarby was placed first in the league mid-season. He subsequently signed a new three-and-a-half-year deal with the side on 2 July. Hammarby eventually fell of in the table, and finished 4th in the league, with Đurđić scoring 13 goals in 27 games.

==== 2019 ====
On 27 July 2019, he scored his first hat-trick with Hammarby in a 6–1 away win against AFC Eskilstuna. Hammarby finished 3rd in the table, as Đurđić scored 13 goals in 27 games and got voted as Allsvenskan forward of the year.

=== Chengdu ===
On 24 January 2020, Đurđić was sold to Chengdu Better City in the China League Two. The transfer fee was reportedly set at around 5 million Swedish kronor.

=== Degerfors IF ===
On 19 August 2021, Đurđić joined newly promoted Allsvenskan club Degerfors IF on a free transfer, signing a two-and-a-half-year contract.

== International career ==
On 15 May 2007, Đurđić made his debut for Serbia at under-21 level, coming on as a substitute in a 6–2 home friendly win over the Cyprus U21s. He was also a member of the team at the Valeriy Lobanovskyi Memorial Tournament in August of that year. On 8 September 2007, Đurđić scored his first goal for the Under-21 side in a 3–1 European Championship qualifier win over Belarus.

On 6 February 2013, Đurđić made his senior debut for Serbia under Siniša Mihajlović, playing the first half in a 3–1 away friendly win against Cyprus.

== Career statistics ==
=== Club ===
As of match played 29 October 2022

Appearances and goals by club, season and competition
Club	Season	League			National Cup		Continental		Other		Total	
Club	Season	Division	Apps	Goals	Apps	Goals	Apps	Goals	Apps	Goals	Apps	Goals
Voždovac	2006–07	Serbian SuperLiga	29	10	2	1	—		—		31	11
Voždovac	2007–08	Serbian First League	27	4	0	0	—		—		27	4
Voždovac	2008–09	Serbian First League	7	1	0	0	—		—		7	1
Voždovac	Total		63	15	2	1	—		—		65	16
Haugesund	2009	Adeccoligaen	25	10	1	0	—		—		26	10
Haugesund	2010	Tippeligaen	27	12	3	5	—		—		30	17
Haugesund	2011	Tippeligaen	27	12	2	1	—		—		29	13
Haugesund	2012	Tippeligaen	18	12	4	5	—		—		22	17
Haugesund	Total		97	46	10	11	—		—		107	57
Helsingborg (loan)	2012	Allsvenskan	11	10	0	0	7	4	—		18	14
Greuther Fürth	2012–13	Bundesliga	15	5	0	0	—		—		15	5
Greuther Fürth	2013–14	2. Bundesliga	15	4	1	1	—		—		16	5
Greuther Fürth	Total		30	9	1	1	—		—		31	10
Augsburg	2014–15	Bundesliga	16	1	1	0	—		—		17	1
Malmö (loan)	2015	Allsvenskan	12	5	0	0	10	1	—		22	6
Fortuna Düsseldorf (loan)	2015–16	2. Bundesliga	12	2	0	0	—		—		12	2
Partizan	2016–17	Serbian SuperLiga	13	1	2	0	2	0	—		17	1
Randers	2016–17	Danish Superliga	9	1	0	0	—		—		9	1
Randers	2017–18	Danish Superliga	17	2	0	0	—		—		17	2
Randers	Total		26	3	0	0	—		—		26	3
Hammarby	2018	Allsvenskan	27	13	0	0	—		—		27	13
Hammarby	2019	Allsvenskan	27	13	5	2	—		—		32	15
Hammarby	Total		54	26	5	2	—		—		59	28
Chengdu Better City	2020	China League One	14	2	0	0	—		—		14	2
Zhejiang (loan)	2021	China League One	8	0	—		—		—		8	0
Degerfors IF	2021	Allsvenskan	11	2	—		—		—		11	2
Degerfors IF	2022	Allsvenskan	19	2	4	5	—		—		23	7
Degerfors IF	Total		30	4	4	5	—		—		34	9
Career total			386	124	25	20	19	5	-0	0	431	149

=== International ===
Appearances and goals by national team and year

National team	Year	Apps	Goals
Serbia	2013	1	0
Total		1	0

== Honours ==
Haugesund

- Norwegian First Division: 2009

Individual

- Eliteserien Forward of the Year: 2011
- Allsvenskan Forward of the Year: 2019
