= Karol Karlík =

Slovak footballer

Personal information
- Full name: Karol Karlík
- Date of birth: 29 June 1986 (age 40)
- Place of birth: Nitra, Czechoslovakia
- Height: 1.85 m (6 ft 1 in)
- Positions: Defensive midfielder; centre back

Youth career
- 1993–2004: Nitra

Senior career*
Years	Team	Apps	(Gls)
2004–2008	Nitra	39	(2)
2006	→ ViOn Zlaté Moravce (loan)	0	(0)
2009–2014	Vysočina Jihlava	128	(14)
2014	Oțelul Galați	13	(0)
2015	Chemnitzer FC	2	(0)
2015	Spartak Myjava	12	(0)
2016–2019	ViOn Zlaté Moravce	66	(4)
2019	Skalica	9	(0)

International career
	Slovakia U21	4	(0)

Managerial career
- 2025–2026: Trenčín B
- 2026–: Trenčín (Assistant)
- * Club domestic league appearances and goals as of 7 January 2020

Karol Karlík (born 29 June 1986) is a Slovak former footballer who played as a defensive midfielder, most recently for MFK Skalica.
