= Jiří Lindr =

Czech footballer

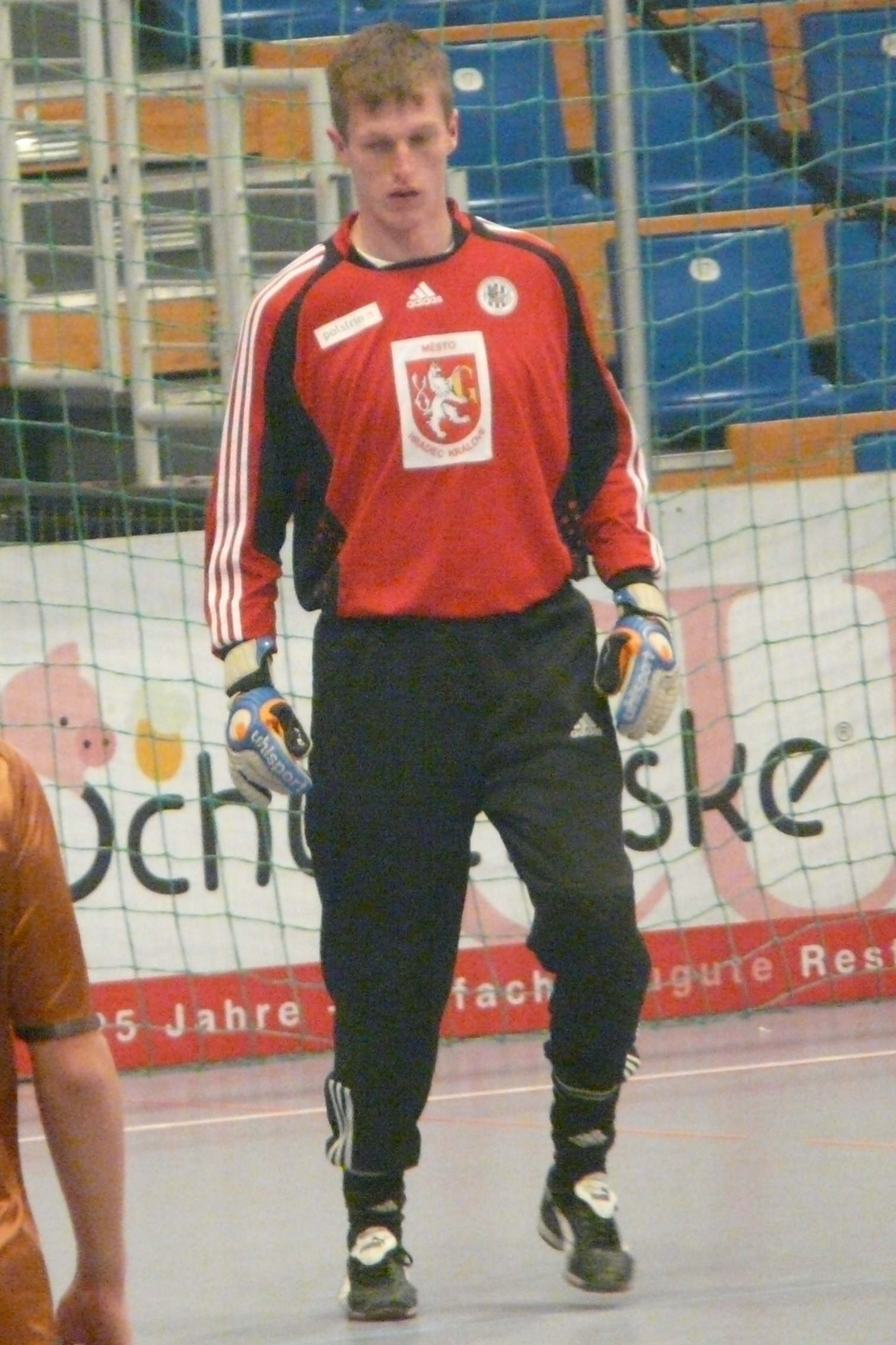

Personal information
- Date of birth: 7 August 1986 (age 38)
- Place of birth: Broumov, Czechoslovakia
- Height: 1.91 m (6 ft 3 in)
- Position(s): Goalkeeper

Senior career*
Years	Team	Apps	(Gls)
2005–2018	Hradec Králové	123	(0)
2018–2019	Ústí nad Labem	20	(0)
- *Club domestic league appearances and goals

Jiří Lindr (born 7 August 1986) is a retired Czech football goalkeeper who played mainly for FC Hradec Králové.
