= Enrico Cibelli =

Sammarinese footballer

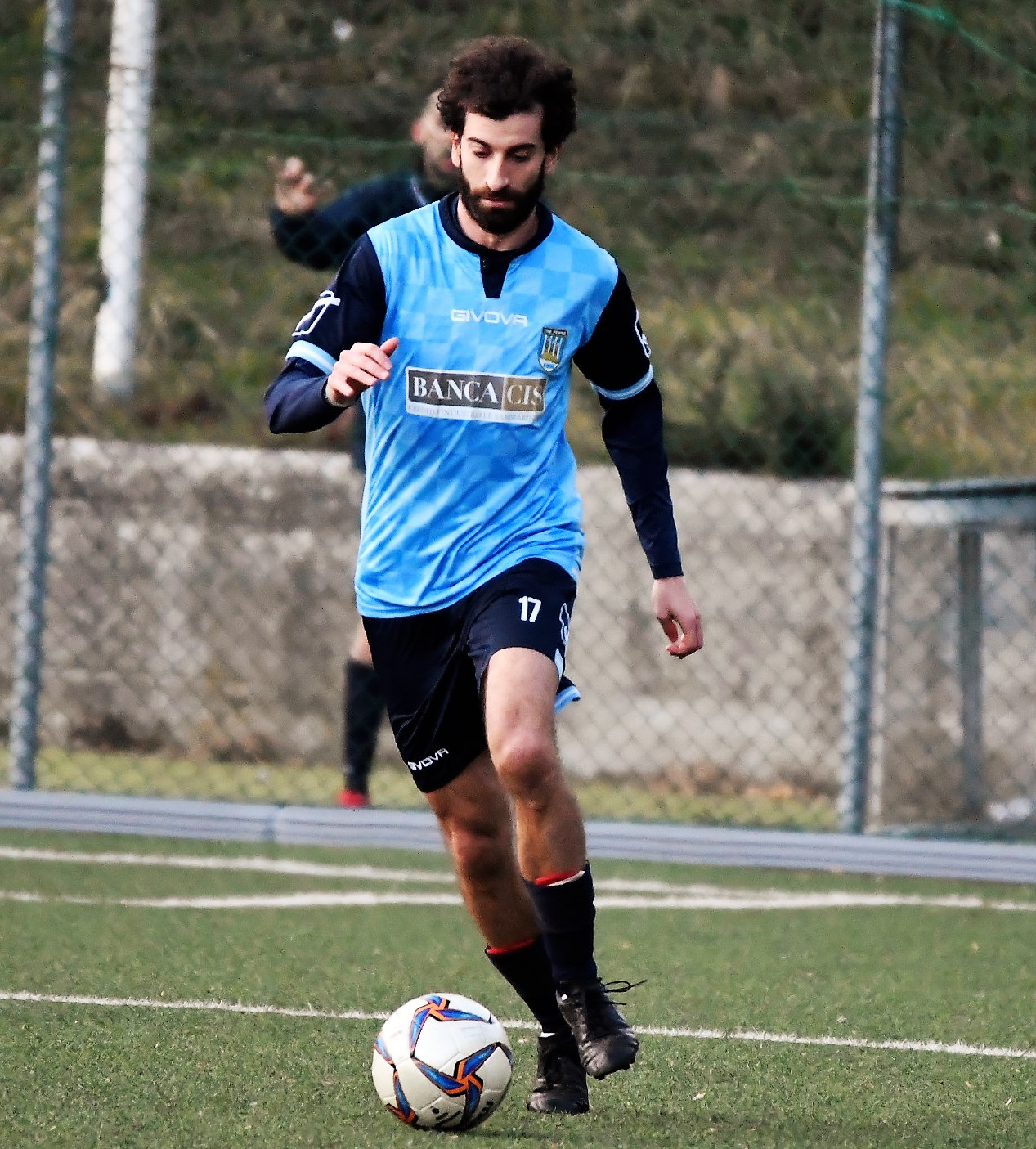
- Enrico Cibelli playing for Tre Penne in 2019

Personal information
- Date of birth: 14 July 1987 (age 39)
- Place of birth: Città di San Marino, San Marino
- Height: 1.78 m (5 ft 10 in)
- Position: Midfielder

Senior career*
| Years | Team | Apps | (Gls) |
| 2003–2004 | San Marino | 10 | (2+) |
| 2004–2017 | Tre Penne | 100+ | (43+) |
| 2017–2018 | Libertas | 15 | (1) |
| 2018–2023 | Tre Penne | 86 | (10) |

International career^{‡}
| 2008–2013 | San Marino | 11 | (0) |
- * Club domestic league appearances and goals as of 17 June 2023 ‡ National team caps and goals as of 18 July 2020

Enrico Cibelli (born 14 July 1987) is a retired Sammarinese footballer. He last played as a midfielder for Tre Penne and formerly the San Marino national football team.

== Club career ==
He was captain of the Tre Penne's squad in their 1–0 win over Shirak F.C. of Armenia in the first qualifying round of the 2013–14 UEFA Champions League. It was the first win by a Sammarinese club in European competition.
