= Martin Kuncl =

Czech footballer (born 1984)

Personal information
- Date of birth: 1 April 1984 (age 42)
- Place of birth: Brno, Czechoslovakia
- Height: 1.82 m (6 ft 0 in)
- Position: Defender

Team information
- Current team: Vyškov

Youth career
- 2000–2005: 1. FC Brno

Senior career*
Years	Team	Apps	(Gls)
2005–2009	1. FC Brno	53	(2)
2009	AC Sparta Prague	0	(0)
2010–2016	1. FC Slovácko	128	(3)
Total		181	(5)

International career
2007	Czech Republic U-21	1	(0)
- * Club domestic league appearances and goals

Martin Kuncl (born 1 April 1984 in Brno) is a Czech footballer who played for most of his career in 1. FC Slovácko. He currently plays in lower tiers.
