= Petr Glaser =

Czech footballer

Personal information
- Date of birth: 30 July 1988 (age 38)
- Place of birth: Žatec, Czechoslovakia
- Height: 1.78 m (5 ft 10 in)
- Position: Midfielder

Team information
- Current team: Baník Souš

Youth career
- –2007: AC Sparta Praha

Senior career*
Years	Team	Apps	(Gls)
2007–2012	Sparta Prague B	106	(5)
2012	→ Baník Sokolov (loan)	20	(3)
2012–2014	Zbrojovka Brno	21	(2)
2014	→ Baník Sokolov (loan)	12	(2)
2014–2016	Karviná	10	(1)
2016–2019	Baník Sokolov	87	(20)
2019–	Baník Souš		
- * Club domestic league appearances and goals as of 19:55, 5 March 2020 (UTC)

Petr Glaser (born 30 July 1988) is a Czech football player who currently plays for FK Baník Souš.

== Career ==
=== Baník Souš ===
In October 2019 it was confirmed, that Glaser had joined FK Baník Souš.
