= Leonid Kovel =

Belarusian footballer

Leanid Kovel
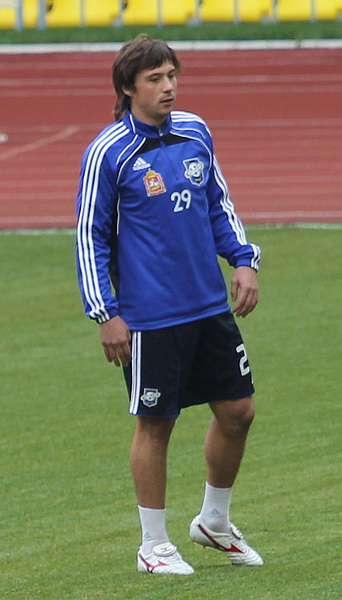

Personal information
- Full name: Leanid Leanidovich Kovel
- Date of birth: 29 July 1986 (age 40)
- Place of birth: Smarhon, Grodno Oblast, Belarusian SSR
- Height: 1.79 m (5 ft 10 1/2 in)
- Position: Forward

Team information
- Current team: Smorgon (assistant coach)

Youth career
- Smorgon
- 2001–2003: RUOR Minsk

Senior career*
Years	Team	Apps	(Gls)
2001–2003	RUOR Minsk	48	(23)
2004–2007	Dinamo Minsk	69	(21)
2007	→ Karpaty Lviv (loan)	29	(12)
2008–2010	Saturn Ramenskoye	37	(0)
2011	Dinamo Minsk	27	(2)
2012	Minsk	22	(8)
2013	Irtysh Pavlodar	6	(1)
2013	Minsk	9	(2)
2014	Karpaty Lviv	0	(0)
2014–2016	Minsk	66	(10)
2017	Rīgas Futbola Skola	26	(3)
2018	Neman Grodno	16	(1)
2019	Minsk	23	(0)
2020	Belshina Bobruisk	30	(9)
2021	Smorgon	14	(2)
2023	Smorgon-2	1	(0)
Total		423	(94)

International career
2004–2009	Belarus U21	34	(6)
2004–2011	Belarus	17	(3)

Managerial career
- 2021–: Smorgon (assistant)
- * Club domestic league appearances and goals

Leanid Kovel (Belarusian: Леанід Леанідавіч Ковель, Russian: Леонид Ковель; born 29 July 1986) is a Belarusian football coach and a former player. He is an assistant coach with Smorgon.

== Career ==
Before coming to Saturn Ramenskoye in 2008, he played for Karpaty Lviv for 2 years.

Kovel made his debut with the Belarus national football team in a friendly match against Turkey on 18 August 2004, entering as a second-half substitute.

After a 2021 season he finished his player career.

== Honours ==
Dinamo Minsk

- Belarusian Premier League champion: 2004

Minsk

- Belarusian Cup winner: 2012–13

== International goals ==
#	Date	Venue	Opponent	Score	Result	Competition
1	22 November 2004	Mohammed Bin Zayed Stadium, Abu Dhabi, United Arab Emirates	United Arab Emirates	2 – 1	3–2	Friendly
2	19 November 2008	GSP Stadium, Nicosia, Cyprus	Cyprus	1 – 2	1–2	Friendly
3	10 October 2009	Regional Sport Complex Brestskiy, Brest, Belarus	Kazakhstan	3 – 0	4–0	World Cup 2010 qualifier

== Career stats ==
Season	Club	Country	Level	Apps	Goals
2014	FC Karpaty Lviv	Ukraine	I	0	0
2013	FC Minsk	Belarus	I	9	2
2013	FC Irtysh Pavlodar	Kazakhstan	I	6	1
2012	FC Minsk	Belarus	I	22	8
2011	Dinamo Minsk	Belarus	I	27	2
2010	FC Saturn Ramenskoye	Russia	I	4	0
2009	FC Saturn Ramenskoye	Russia	I	20	0
2008	FC Saturn Ramenskoye	Russia	I	6	0
2007–08	FC Karpaty Lviv	Ukraine	I	16	6
2006–07	FC Karpaty Lviv	Ukraine	I	13	6
2006	FC Dinamo Minsk	Belarus	I	19	5
2005	FC Dinamo Minsk	Belarus	I	23	9
2004	FC Dinamo Minsk	Belarus	I	27	7
