= Jan Kosak =

Czech footballer

Personal information
- Date of birth: 3 February 1992 (age 34)
- Place of birth: Czechoslovakia
- Height: 1.79 m (5 ft 10 in)
- Position: Midfielder

Team information
- Current team: FC Vysočina Jihlava
- Number: 18

Senior career*
Years	Team	Apps	(Gls)
2009–	FC Vysočina Jihlava	42	(1)
2012	→ Vlašim (loan)	14	(2)

International career^{‡}
2008	Czech Republic U16	2	(0)
2010	Czech Republic U18	4	(0)
2011	Czech Republic U19	2	(1)
- * Club domestic league appearances and goals as of 1 June 2014 ‡ National team caps and goals as of 1 June 2014

Jan Kosak (born 3 February 1992) is a Czech football midfielder, who currently plays for FC Vysočina Jihlava.
