= Léonard Kweuke =

Cameroonian footballer (born 1987)

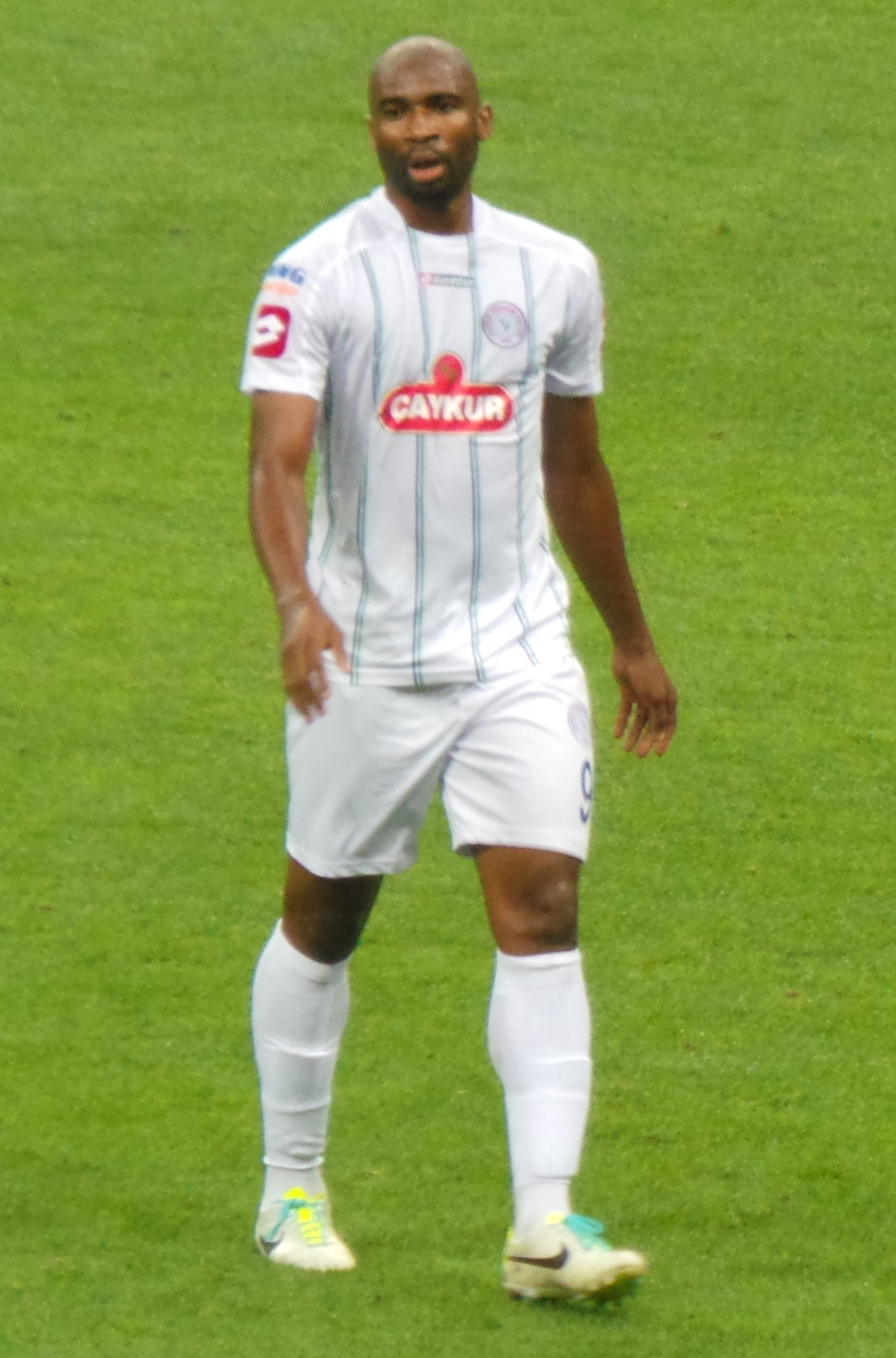

Personal information
- Full name: Leony Léonard Kweuke
- Date of birth: 12 July 1987 (age 39)
- Place of birth: Yaoundé, Cameroon
- Height: 1.88 m (6 ft 2 in)
- Position: Striker

Senior career*
Years	Team	Apps	(Gls)
2006–2007	Esteghlal	8	(0)
2007–2008	Steel Azin	18	(6)
2008–2010	DAC Dunajská Streda	16	(11)
2009	→ Eintracht Frankfurt (loan)	6	(0)
2009–2010	→ Energie Cottbus (loan)	29	(5)
2010–2013	Sparta Prague	74	(31)
2013–2018	Çaykur Rizespor	113	(54)
Total		264	(107)

International career
2011–2018	Cameroon	25	(3)
- * Club domestic league appearances and goals

Leony Léonard Kweuke (born 12 July 1987) is a retired Cameroonian footballer.

== Career ==
On 18 December 2008, Kweuke's club DAC Dunajská Streda loaned him to Eintracht Frankfurt to play in the German Bundesliga. For the 2009–10 season, he was loaned to Energie Cottbus. On 10 June 2010, DAC announced his return after two years in Germany, but he was sold to Sparta Prague. Kweuke was banned by the league in May 2013 after receiving a red card in a Czech Cup match against Mladá Boleslav. The dismissal was for a tackle which broke the leg of defender Radek Dosoudil in two places. The ban, to last for 12 matches, was the longest-ever punishment issued by the Czech league.

== International goals ==
Scores and results list Cameroon's goal tally first.

#	Date	Venue	Opponent	Score	Result	Competition
1.	3 September 2011	Stade Ahmadou Ahidjo, Yaoundé, Cameroon	Mauritius	1–0	5–0	2012 Africa Cup of Nations qualifier
2.	11 October 2011	Estadio de Malabo, Malabo, Equatorial Guinea	Equatorial Guinea	1–0	1–1	Friendly
3.	15 October 2014	Stade Ahmadou Ahidjo, Yaoundé, Cameroon	Sierra Leone	1–0	2–0	2015 Africa Cup of Nations qualifier

== Honours ==
=== Club ===
- Czech Republic Football Supercup: 2010
- Czech First League Runner-up: 2010–2011, 2011–12, 2012–13

=== Individual ===
- Czech First League Foreign footballer of the season by the readers of "iDNES.cz": 2010–2011
- Czech First League Discovery of the season: 2010–2011
- Czech First League All Stars media: 2010–11

== Personal life ==
Kweuke is a relative of Samuel Eto'o.
