= Martin Kotyza =

Czech footballer

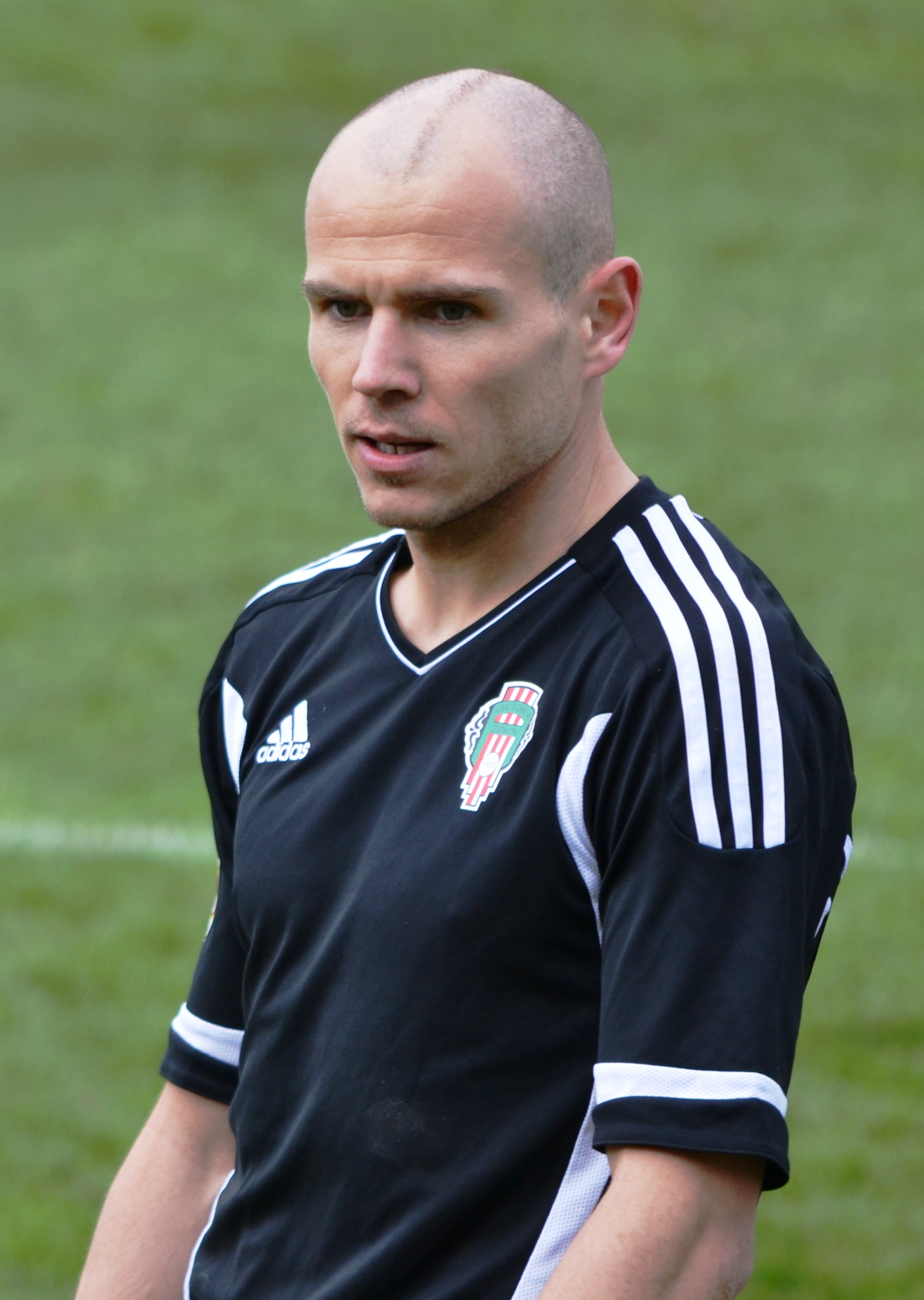
- Kotyza in 2013

Personal information
- Date of birth: 1 October 1984 (age 42)
- Place of birth: Czechoslovakia
- Height: 1.71 m (5 ft 7 1/2 in)
- Position: Midfielder

Team information
- Current team: FK Viktoria Žižkov
- Number: 5

Senior career*
| Years | Team | Apps | (Gls) |
| 2004–2006 | Jablonec | 4 | (0) |
| 2006–2010 | Bohemians 1905 | 19 | (2) |
| 2009 | → Čáslav (loan) | 15 | (3) |
| 2010–2011 | Vlašim | 38 | (4) |
| 2012– | Žižkov | 31 | (2) |
- * Club domestic league appearances and goals as of 31 March 2013

Martin Kotyza (born 1 October 1984) is a Czech football player who currently plays for FK Viktoria Žižkov.
