= Tomáš Zápotočný =

Czech footballer

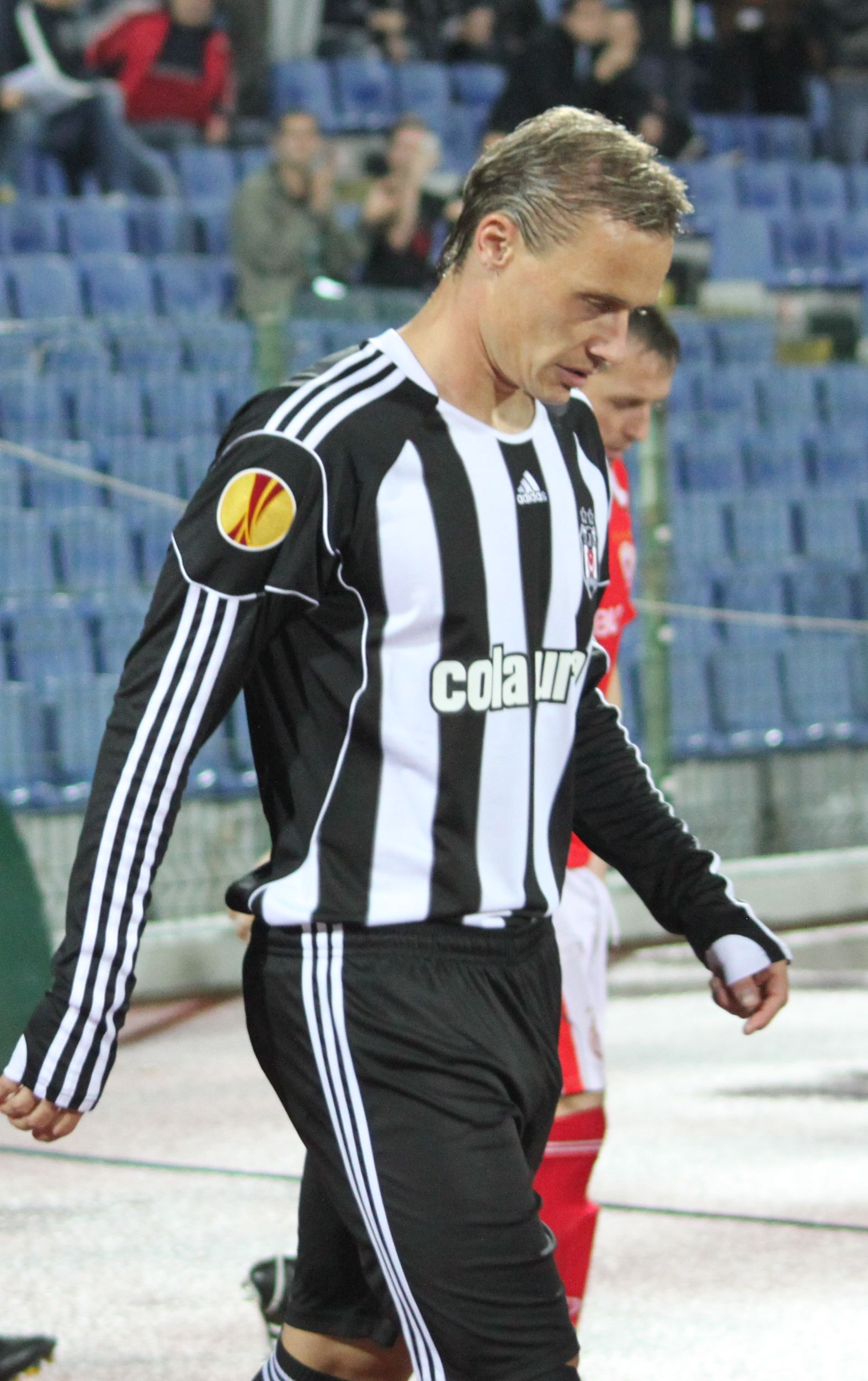

Personal information
- Full name: Tomáš Zápotočný
- Date of birth: 13 September 1980 (age 46)
- Place of birth: Příbram, Czechoslovakia
- Height: 1.81 m (5 ft 11 in)
- Position: Defender

Youth career
- 1990–2000: Dukla Příbram

Senior career*
Years	Team	Apps	(Gls)
2000–2001	Dukla Příbram	22	(2)
2002	Petra Drnovice	4	(0)
2002–2006	Slovan Liberec	97	(15)
2007–2008	Udinese	32	(0)
2008–2011	Beşiktaş	48	(4)
2009–2010	→ Bursaspor (loan)	21	(3)
2011–2013	Sparta Prague	39	(5)
2013–2016	FK Příbram	77	(6)
2016–2017	Baník Ostrava	28	(2)
2017–2018	FK Příbram	13	(1)

International career^{‡}
2001	Czech Republic U21	3	(0)
2006–2007	Czech Republic	4	(0)

Managerial career
- 2018–2020: Příbram (assistant)
- 2020–2021: Příbram B
- 2021–2022: Příbram
- 2022–2023: České Budějovice
- 2024–2025: Opava
- * Club domestic league appearances and goals as of 19 June 2018 ‡ National team caps and goals as of 26 November 2017

Tomáš Zápotočný (born 13 September 1980) is a Czech retired footballer, who last played for 1. FK Příbram in the Czech National Football League.

== Football career ==
He signed for Udinese in the January transfer window for an unconfirmed €500,000 bid. He arrived from Czech side Slovan Liberec, for whom he was the captain and won the 2006–07 player of the season award. He scored his first goal for the club in a 2–1 friendly win over Slovene football club NK Gorica.

On 25 February 2007 he played his first Serie A match for Udinese against Parma. On 1 July 2008, he was sold to Turkish side Beşiktaş for €4.5 million, re-joining Tomáš Sivok. He signed a 3+1-year contract worth €750,000 per season.

On 17 September 2013, Zápotočný joined Czech First League side FK Příbram, signing a three-year contract.

== International career ==
Zápotočný played three times for his county's under-21 team. He currently has four caps for the senior Czech Republic side.

== Honours ==
- Slovan Liberec
  - Czech First League (1): 2005–06
- Beşiktaş
  - Süper Lig (1): 2008–09
- Bursaspor
  - Süper Lig (1): 2009–10
