= Ondřej Švejdík =

Czech footballer

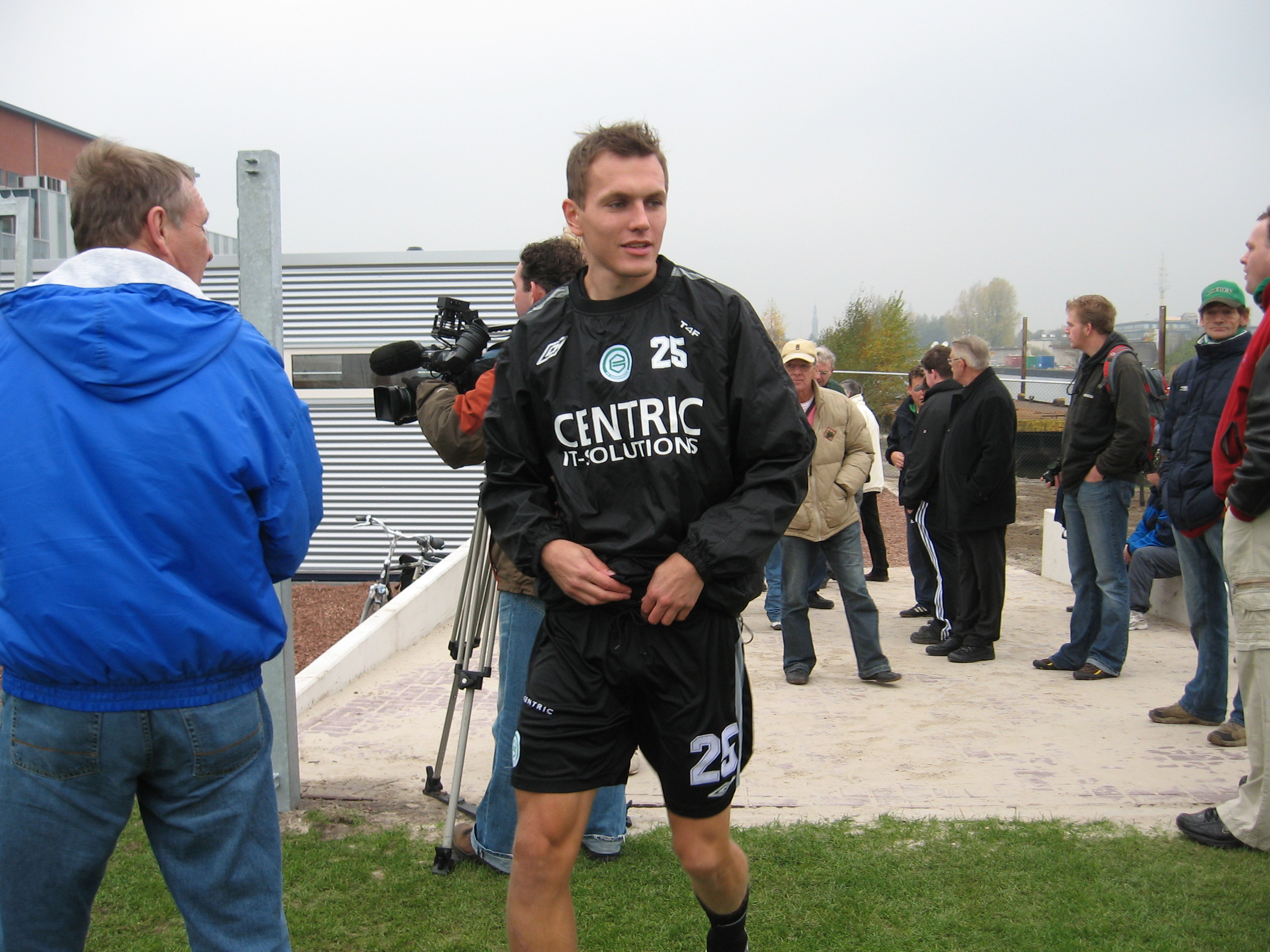

Personal information
- Date of birth: 3 December 1982 (age 43)
- Place of birth: Opava, Czechoslovakia
- Height: 1.89 m (6 ft 2 in)
- Position: Centre back

Team information
- Current team: Loko Prague (assistant)

Youth career
- Ostroj Opava
- Kaučuk Opava

Senior career*
Years	Team	Apps	(Gls)
2000–2002	Opava	21	(0)
2002–2004	Bohemians 1905	25	(3)
2004–2006	Mladá Boleslav	44	(1)
2006–2010	Groningen	59	(2)
2011–2016	Sparta Prague	60	(4)
2011–2012	→ Dukla Prague (loan)	27	(2)
2015	→ Slovan Liberec (loan)	10	(1)
2016	→ Žilina (loan)	4	(0)
2017–2019	Viktoria Žižkov	46	(1)
2019–2020	Slavoj Vyšehrad	11	(1)

International career
1998–1999	Czech Republic U16	7	(0)
1999–2000	Czech Republic U17	12	(0)
2000–2001	Czech Republic U18	6	(0)

Managerial career
- ?–2022: Viktoria Žižkov B
- 2022–2024: Loko Vltavín (assistant)
- 2024–2026: Sparta Prague B (assistant)
- 2026–: Loko Prague (assistant)
- * Club domestic league appearances and goals as of 13:46, 27 May 2019 (UTC)

Ondřej Švejdík (born 3 December 1982) is a Czech manager and former footballer who last played for FC Slavoj Vyšehrad. His former teams are SFC Opava, Bohemians 1905, FK Mladá Boleslav, FC Groningen, FK Dukla Prague and FC Slovan Liberec.

== Career ==
=== Early career ===
Švejdík went to school in Opava, where he began his football life as a junior player. Between 1998 and 2001, Švejdík represented the Czech Republic at youth international level, playing for teams up to the under-18 level. He played at the 2001 UEFA European Under-18 Football Championship. During this time he played club football in the Czech First League for SFC Opava.

Švejdík left Opava and joined Bohemians in August 2002.

Švejdík played 24 games in the 2005–06 Czech First League as FK Mladá Boleslav finished the season in second place, qualifying for the following season's UEFA Champions League.

=== Netherlands ===
Švejdík left FK Mladá Boleslav in 2006, joining Dutch side FC Groningen in the Eredivisie on a four-year contract. He played for Groningen in the 2006–07 UEFA Cup, making his competition debut on 14 September 2006 in the 4–2 first round loss against Serbian side Partizan Belgrade.

At Groningen, Švejdík suffered a couple of injuries including breaking his arm in 2007 and undergoing surgery for a knee problem in 2009.

=== Return to the Czech Republic ===
After being released by Groningen, Švejdík returned to the Czech Republic in 2011, joining AC Sparta Prague as a free agent.

Švejdík moved to FK Dukla Prague on loan for the 2011–12 Czech First League.
