= 2009–10 AC Sparta Prague season =

Sparta Prague
2009–10 season
- Manager: Jozef Chovanec
- Stadium: Generali Arena
- Czech First League: 1st
- Czech Cup: Quarter-finals
- UEFA Champions League: Third qualifying round
- UEFA Europa League: Group stage
- Top goalscorer: League: Wilfried Bony (9)
- Average home league attendance: 10,766
- Biggest win: 6–0 v Náchod-Deštné (Away, 8 October 2009, Czech Cup)
- Biggest defeat: 0–3 v Panathinaikos (Away, 4 August 2009, UEFA Champions League); 0–3 v Copenhagen (Home, 16 December 2009, UEFA Europa League)

The 2009–10 season was Athletic Club Sparta Prague's 17th consecutive season in the Czech First League. In addition to the domestic league, Sparta Prague participated in that season's editions of the Czech Cup, the UEFA Champions League and the UEFA Europa League.

== Squad ==
Squad at end of season

Note: Flags indicate national team as defined under FIFA eligibility rules; some limited exceptions apply. Players may hold more than one non-FIFA nationality.

No.	Pos.	Nation	Player
2	DF	CZE	Tomáš Řepka
3	MF	CRO	Manuel Pamić
4	DF	AUT	Niklas Hoheneder
5	MF	CZE	Ladislav Krejčí
6	FW	SVK	Miloš Lačný
7	MF	CZE	Libor Sionko
9	FW	CZE	Milan Jurdík
11	MF	SVK	Igor Žofčák
12	FW	CIV	Wilfried Bony
13	MF	CZE	Ondřej Kušnír
14	FW	CZE	Václav Kadlec
15	DF	CZE	Jiří Kladrubský
16	DF	CZE	Roman Polom
17	FW	CZE	Lukáš Třešňák

No.	Pos.	Nation	Player
18	DF	CZE	Martin Sus
19	MF	CZE	Luboš Kalouda
20	MF	SVK	Juraj Kucka
21	DF	CZE	Erich Brabec
22	MF	CZE	Martin Zeman
23	MF	BLR	Dzyanis Kowba
24	GK	SVK	Matúš Kozáčik
25	MF	CZE	Kamil Vacek
26	GK	CZE	Milan Švenger
27	MF	CZE	Luboš Hušek
28	MF	CZE	Zdeněk Folprecht
29	GK	CZE	Jaromír Blažek
30	DF	CZE	Lukáš Hejda

== Competitions ==
=== Overview ===
Competition	First match	Last match	Starting round	Final position	Record							
Competition	First match	Last match	Starting round	Final position	Pld	W	D	L	GF	GA	GD	Win %
Czech First League	24 July 2009	15 May 2010	Matchday 1	Winners	30	16	14	0	42	14	+28	53.33
Czech Cup	3 September 2009	15 April 2010	Second round	Quarter-finals	6	4	0	2	16	2	+14	66.67
UEFA Champions League	28 July 2009	4 August 2009	Third qualifying round	Third qualifying round	2	1	0	1	3	4	−1	50.00
UEFA Europa League	20 August 2009	16 December 2009	Play-off round	Group stage	8	4	1	3	10	9	+1	50.00
Total					46	25	15	6	71	29	+42	54.35

Source: Competitions

=== Czech First League ===
==== League table ====
Pos	Team	Pld	W	D	L	GF	GA	GD	Pts	Qualification or relegation
1	Sparta Prague (C)	30	16	14	0	42	14	+28	62	Qualification for Champions League second qualifying round
2	Jablonec	30	18	7	5	42	24	+18	61	Qualification for Europa League third qualifying round
3	Baník Ostrava	30	17	9	4	47	25	+22	60	Qualification for Europa League second qualifying round
4	Teplice	30	15	10	5	44	25	+19	55	
5	Viktoria Plzeň	30	12	12	6	42	33	+9	48	Qualification for Europa League third qualifying round (Note: Viktoria Plzeň won the 2009–10 Czech Cup and qualified for the third qualifying round of the UEFA Europa League.)

Source: Fortuna liga
Rules for classification: 1) points; 2) goal difference; 3) number of goals scored.
(C) Champions

==== Results summary ====
Overall								Home						Away					
Pld	W	D	L	GF	GA	GD	Pts	W	D	L	GF	GA	GD	W	D	L	GF	GA	GD
30	16	14	0	42	14	+28	62	10	5	0	24	3	+21	6	9	0	18	11	+7

Source: Competitions

==== Results by round ====
Round	1	2	3	4	5	6	7	8	9	10	11	12	13	14	15	16	17	18	19	20	21	22	23	24	25	26	27	28	29	30
Ground	A	H	A	H	H	A	H	A	H	A	H	A	H	A	H	A	H	A	A	H	A	H	A	H	A	H	A	H	A	H
Result	D	D	D	W	W	D	W	D	D	W	D	W	D	W	W	W	D	W	W	W	D	W	D	W	D	W	D	W	D	W
Position	12	11	12	7	5	7	4	4	4	3	6	4	4	4	3	2	3	2	2	1	1	1	1	1	1	1	1	1	1	1
Points	1	2	3	6	9	10	13	14	15	18	19	22	23	26	29	32	33	36	39	42	43	46	47	50	51	54	55	58	59	62

Source: Matches
A = Away; H = Home; W = Win; D = Draw; L = Loss

==== Matches ====
24 July 2009 1	Teplice	0–0	Sparta Prague	Teplice
	Ljevaković (yellow card) 14'; Vachoušek (yellow card) 65'	Report		Stadium: Na Stínadlech; Attendance: 15,120; Referee: Pavel Královec; Assistant referees: Ivo Chytil, Petr Vysloužil

31 July 2009 2	Sparta Prague	0–0	Bohemians 1905	Prague
	Řepka (yellow card) 66'; Pamić (yellow card) 74'	Report	Štohanzl (yellow card) 16'; Hartig (yellow card) 61'; Nešpor (yellow card) 90'	Stadium: Generali Arena; Attendance: 15,921; Referee: Libor Kovařík; Assistant referees: Kryštof Mencl, Tomáš Kovařík

8 August 2009 3	Příbram	1–1	Sparta Prague	Příbram
	Šmejkal (yellow card) 60'; Cafu 68'	Report	Kadlec 41'; Bony (yellow card) 43'; Kušnír (yellow card) 75'; Jirouš (yellow card) 81'	Stadium: Na Litavce; Attendance: 7,156; Referee: Pavel Franěk; Assistant referees: Miroslav Zlámal, Josef Košec

15 August 2009 4	Sparta Prague	2–0	Kladno	Prague
	Vacek 28'; Zeman (yellow card) 42'; Pamić (yellow card) 58'; Střeštík (yellow card) 77'; Bony 88'	Report	Holub (yellow card) 9' (red card) 25'; Bartoš (yellow card) 34'; Szabo (yellow card) 45'; Pavlík (yellow card) 59'	Stadium: Generali Arena; Attendance: 7,956; Referee: Tomáš Kocourek; Assistant referees: Antonín Kordula, Pavel Peřina

23 August 2009 5	Sparta Prague	1–0	Mladá Boleslav	Prague
	Vacek (yellow card) 18'; Prudnikov (yellow card) 61'; Kadlec 90'	Report	Kúdela (yellow card) 50'; Mendy (yellow card) 75'; Rajnoch (yellow card) 84'	Stadium: Generali Arena; Attendance: 12,489; Referee: Roman Hrubeš; Assistant referees: Petr Hojsík, Ondřej Pelikán

31 August 2009 6	Sigma Olomouc	1–1	Sparta Prague	Olomouc
	Otepka (yellow card) 6'; Petr (yellow card) 71'; Ordoš 73'	Report	Hubník 24', (yellow card) 49'; Kušnír (yellow card) 79'; Vacek (yellow card) 88'	Stadium: Andrův stadion Attendance: 6,636; Referee: Jan Jílek; Assistant referees: Martin Večeřa, Emanuel Marek

12 September 2009 7	Sparta Prague	2–0	Jablonec	Prague
	Kušnír 60'; Řepka (yellow card) 67'; Bony 70'	Report	Jarolím (yellow card) 27'	Stadium: Generali Arena; Attendance: 7,521; Referee: Jiří Adam; Assistant referees: Dušan Pospíšil, Zdeněk Dobrovolný

21 September 2009 8	Brno	1–1	Sparta Prague	Brno
	Došek (yellow card) 45', (goal) 64'	Report	Holenda 81'	Stadium: Městský fotbalový stadion Srbská; Attendance: 8,257; Referee: Radek Příhoda; Assistant referees: Petr Hojsík, Ladislav Gallo

26 September 2009 9	Sparta Prague	0–0	Viktoria Plzeň	Prague
	Střeštík (yellow card) 23'; Řepka (yellow card) 45'; Hušek (yellow card) 45'	Report	Bakoš (yellow card) 34'; Bystroň (yellow card) 46'; Limberský (yellow card) 77'	Stadium: Generali Arena; Attendance: 7,520; Referee: Roman Hrubeš; Assistant referees: Ivo Chytil, Emanuel Marek

5 October 2009 10	Slavia Prague	0–1	Sparta Prague	Prague
	Šmicer (yellow card) 90'	Report	Bony 28'; Kadlec (yellow card) 35'; Hoheneder (yellow card) 52'; Holenda (yellow card) 84'; Kušnír (yellow card) 90'	Stadium: Synot Tip Arena; Attendance: 19,370; Referee: Jiří Jech; Assistant referees: Patrik Filípek, Kryštof Mencl

17 October 2009 11	Sparta Prague	1–1	Dynamo České Budějovice	Prague
	Bony 12'; Kalouda (yellow card) 45'; Kucka (yellow card) 64'	Report	Doležal (yellow card) 24'; Hunal (yellow card) 25'; Jarabica (yellow card) 44'; Hudson 79'	Stadium: Generali Arena; Attendance: 5,522; Referee: Pavel Franěk; Assistant referees: Emil Ubias, Petr Vysloužil

25 October 2009 12	Bohemians Prague (Střížkov)	2–3	Sparta Prague	Prague
	Ibe 12', (yellow card) 12'; Lentsevich (yellow card) 25'; Dobeš 39', (yellow card) 76'; Fenyk (yellow card) 70'	Report	Zeman 32'; Vacek (yellow card) 44', (goal) 75'; Kušnír 86'	Stadium: Stadion Evžena Rošického; Attendance: 1,722; Referee: Milan Makovička; Assistant referees: Josef Košec, Václav Štěrba

31 October 2009 13	Sparta Prague	1–1	Baník Ostrava	Prague
	Žofčák 55' (pen.)	Report	Strnad (yellow card) 31'; Tchuř 54'; Lička (yellow card) 66'	Stadium: Generali Arena; Attendance: 9,715; Referee: Michal Paták; Assistant referees: Ivo Chytil, Ladislav Gallo

9 November 2009 14	Slovácko	0–1	Sparta Prague	Uherské Hradiště
	Němčický (yellow card) 14'; Švancara (yellow card) 35'; Cléber (yellow card) 44'; Vašek (yellow card) 90'	Report	Vacek (yellow card) 10'; Kucka (yellow card) 14'; Kušnír (yellow card) 28'; Řepka (yellow card) 35'; Holenda 50'	Stadium: Městský fotbalový stadion Miroslava Valenty; Attendance: 7,122; Referee: Jiří Adam; Assistant referees: Martin Večeřa, Zdeněk Dobrovolný

21 November 2009 15	Sparta Prague	2–0	Slovan Liberec	Prague
	Holenda 23'; Bony (yellow card) 26'; Zeman (yellow card) 52'; Kadlec 68'	Report	Kelić (red card) 8'; Papoušek (yellow card) 9'; Blažek (yellow card) 27'; Dočkal (yellow card) 35'; Vácha (yellow card) 53'; Liška (yellow card) 86'	Stadium: Generali Arena; Attendance: 9,209; Referee: Tomáš Kocourek; Assistant referees: Patrik Filípek, Robert Kubáň

28 November 2009 16	Bohemians 1905	0–2	Sparta Prague	Prague
	Ibragimov (yellow card) 71'; Lukáš (yellow card) 74'	Report	Hubník (yellow card) 15'; Holenda 60'; Žofčák 64'	Stadium: Ďolíček; Attendance: 7,153; Referee: Dagmar Damková; Assistant referees: Emil Ubias, Petr Slavík

27 February 2010 17	Sparta Prague	1–1	Příbram	Prague
	Bony 22'; Hejda (yellow card) 75'	Report	Pilík (yellow card) 29'; Hušbauer (yellow card) 38'; Wágner 78'; Tarczal (yellow card) 84'	Stadium: Generali Arena; Attendance: 10,066; Referee: Radek Matějek; Assistant referees: Ladislav Gallo, Petr Vysloužil

7 March 2010 18	Kladno	0–1	Sparta Prague	Kladno
	Bartoš (yellow card) 34'; Szabo (yellow card) 39'; Tesař (yellow card) 44'; Mráz (yellow card) 70'	Report	Žofčák 44' (pen.), (yellow card) 45'; Lačný (yellow card) 72'; Vacek (yellow card) 81'; Sionko (yellow card) 90'	Stadium: Stadion Františka Kloze; Attendance: 1,780; Referee: Milan Makovička; Assistant referees: Patrik Filípek, Dušan Pospíšil

14 March 2010 19	Mladá Boleslav	1–2	Sparta Prague	Mladá Boleslav
	Kulič 27'; Sylvestre (yellow card) 51'; Kalina (yellow card) 77'; Procházka (yellow card) 82'	Report	Hoheneder (yellow card) 72'; Kucka (yellow card) 82'; Kušnír 86'; Bony (yellow card) 90'; Sionko 90'	Stadium: Městský stadion Attendance: 4,386; Referee: Pavel Královec; Assistant referees: Antonín Kordula, Zdeněk Dobrovolný

20 March 2010 20	Sparta Prague	4–0	Sigma Olomouc	Prague
	Žofčák 35' (pen.), (yellow card) 48'; Sionko 45', 67'; Bony 58'; Lačný (yellow card) 83'	Report	Janotka (yellow card) 32'; Dreksa (red card) 34'; Škerle (yellow card) 35'; Rossi (yellow card) 40'	Stadium: Generali Arena; Attendance: 10,404; Referee: Tomáš Kocourek; Assistant referees: Josef Košec, Ladislav Gallo

24 March 2010 21	Jablonec	0–0	Sparta Prague	Jablonec nad Nisou
	Loučka (yellow card) 31'	Report	Hoheneder (yellow card) 11'; Kušnír (yellow card) 26'	Stadium: Stadion Střelnice; Attendance: 5,232; Referee: Jiří Jech; Assistant referees: Miroslav Zlámal, Zdeněk Koval

28 March 2010 22	Sparta Prague	3–0	Brno	Prague
	Kucka 43', 51'; Kadlec 47'	Report	Bureš (yellow card) 38'; Jílek (yellow card) 85'	Stadium: Generali Arena; Attendance: 10.655; Referee: Roman Hrubeš; Assistant referees: Martin Wilczek, Roman Tacina

5 April 2010 23	Viktoria Plzeň	2–2	Sparta Prague	Plzeň
	Bakoš 47'; Limberský (yellow card) 71'; Rada (yellow card) 90'; Rajtoral 90'	Report	Kladrubský (yellow card) 32'; Řepka (yellow card) 44'; Kucka (yellow card) 62', (goal) 87'; Bony 81'	Stadium: Stadion města Plzně; Attendance: 6,522; Referee: Libor Kovařík; Assistant referees: Emil Ubias, Libor Novák

12 April 2010 24	Sparta Prague	1–0	Slavia Prague	Prague
	Řepka (yellow card) 21'; Sionko (yellow card) 25', (goal) 39'; Bony (yellow card) 82'	Report	Ragued (yellow card) 71'; Krajčík (yellow card) 76'	Stadium: Generali Arena; Attendance: 18,639; Referee: Pavel Franěk; Assistant referees: Miroslav Zlámal, Ivo Chytil

18 April 2010 25	Dynamo České Budějovice	0–0	Sparta Prague	České Budějovice
	Ondrášek (yellow card) 42'; Kučera (yellow card) 86'; Stráský (yellow card) 90'	Report	Kucka (yellow card) 61'; Lačný (yellow card) 69'	Stadium: Stadion Střelecký ostrov Attendance: 5,564; Referee: Michal Paták; Assistant referees: Martin Večeřa, Jaroslav Moudrý

24 April 2010 26	Sparta Prague	1–0	Bohemians Prague (Střížkov)	Prague
	Kadlec 50'	Report	Ježdík (yellow card) 18'; Horáček (yellow card) 34'; Dittrich (yellow card) 71'; Lentsevich (yellow card) 77'	Stadium: Generali Arena; Attendance: 7,813; Referee: Radek Matějek; Assistant referees: Martin Wilczek, Petr Čecháček

2 May 2010 27	Baník Ostrava	1–1	Sparta Prague	Ostrava
	Řepka 13' (o.g.); Varadi (yellow card) 39'	Report	Řepka (yellow card) 16'; Hoheneder (yellow card) 40'; Vacek (yellow card) 50'; Kadlec 53'	Stadium: Bazaly; Attendance: 17,372; Referee: Dagmar Damková; Assistant referees: Antonín Kordula, Kryštof Mencl

5 May 2010 28	Sparta Prague	4–0	Slovácko	Prague
	Bony 15', 78'; Žofčák 30'; Zeman (yellow card) 82'; Kušnír 86'	Report	Abrahám (yellow card) 77'; Vašek (yellow card) 86'	Stadium: Generali Arena; Attendance: 8,849; Referee: Roman Hrubeš; Assistant referees: Zdeněk Dobrovolný, Emanuel Marek

8 May 2010 29	Slovan Liberec	2–2	Sparta Prague	Liberec
	Vulin 8', (yellow card) 8'; Papoušek 76'; Bosančić (yellow card) 77'	Report	Kušnír (yellow card) 10'; Kucka 14', 77'	Stadium: Stadion u Nisy; Attendance: 7,625; Referee: Pavel Královec; Assistant referees: Patrik Filípek, Petr Hojsík

15 May 2010 30	Sparta Prague	1–0	Teplice	Prague
	Řepka 47'	Report	Stožický (yellow card) 11'; Lukáš (yellow card) 43'; Mareš (yellow card) 73'	Stadium: Generali Arena; Attendance: 19,215; Referee: Michal Paták; Assistant referees: Miroslav Zlámal, Jiří Jiřík

=== Czech Cup ===
3 September 2009 Second round	Ústí nad Orlicí	0–4	Sparta Prague	Ústí nad Orlicí
		Report		Stadium: TJ Jiskra fotbalový stadion

8 October 2009 Third round	Náchod-Deštné	0–6	Sparta Prague	Náchod
		Report		Stadium: Stadion Běloves

==== Fourth round ====
13 October 2009 First leg	Dynamo České Budějovice	0–5	Sparta Prague	České Budějovice
		Report		Stadium: Stadion Střelecký ostrov

11 November 2009 Second leg	Sparta Prague	1–0 (6–0 agg.)	Dynamo České Budějovice	Prague
		Report		Stadium: Generali Arena
Note: Sparta Prague won 6–0 on aggregate.

==== Quarter-finals ====
1 April 2010 First leg	Slavia Prague	1–0	Sparta Prague	Prague
	M. Černý 15'; Hubáček (yellow card) 37'	Report	Bony (yellow card) 10'; Kušnír (yellow card) 40'	Stadium: Synot Tip Arena

15 April 2010 Second leg	Sparta Prague	0–1 (0–2 agg.)	Slavia Prague	Prague
	Sionko (yellow card) 38'; Kušnír (yellow card) 43'; Řepka (yellow card) 60'	Report	J. Černý 8' (pen.), (yellow card) 40'; Kopic (yellow card) 49'	Stadium: Generali Arena
Note: Slavia Prague won 2–0 on aggregate.

=== UEFA Champions League ===
==== Qualifying rounds ====
===== Third qualifying round =====
28 July 2009 First leg	Sparta Prague (Czech Republic)	3–1	(Greece) Panathinaikos	Prague, Czech Republic
20:00 CEST (UTC+2)	Řepka (yellow card) 23'; Holenda 26'; Vacek 32'; Blažek (yellow card) 33'; Kalouda 86'; Kušnír (yellow card) 90+3'; Hubník (yellow card) 90+4'	Report	Cissé (penalty missed) 35', (yellow card) 88'; Salpingidis 67'; Sarriegi (yellow card) 70'	Stadium: Generali Arena; Attendance: 12,057; Referee: Ivan Bebek (Croatia); Assistant referees: Tomislav Petrović (Croatia), Željko Grgec (Croatia); Fourth official: Marijo Strahonja (Croatia)

4 August 2009 Second leg	Panathinaikos (Greece)	3–0 (4–3 agg.)	(Czech Republic) Sparta Prague	Athens, Greece
21:45 EEST (UTC+3)	Sarriegi (yellow card) 30', (goal) 45'; Katsouranis 54'; Gabriel (yellow card) 79'; Salpingidis 89'	Report	Hoheneder (yellow card) 44'; Blažek (yellow card) 89'	Stadium: Olympic Stadium; Attendance: 47,637; Referee: Pedro Proença (Portugal); Assistant referees: Tiago Trigo (Portugal), Venâncio Tomé (Portugal); Fourth official: Pedro Jorge Carvalheiro Henriques (Portugal)
Note: Panathinaikos won 4–3 on aggregate.

=== UEFA Europa League ===
==== Play-off round ====
20 August 2009 First leg	Maribor (Slovenia)	0–2	(Czech Republic) Sparta Prague	Maribor, Slovenia
20:45 CEST (UTC+2)	Bunderla (yellow card) 57'; Samardžić (yellow card) 72'; Bačinović (yellow card) 90'	Report	Vacek (yellow card) 26'; Bony 29', 86'; Pamić (yellow card) 70'	Stadium: Ljudski vrt Attendance: 10,500; Referee: Jouni Hyytiä (Finland); Assistant referees: Jouko Ikonen (Finland), Esa Vehvilainen (Finland); Fourth official: Antti Munukka (Finland)

27 August 2009 Second leg	Sparta Prague (Czech Republic)	1–0 (3–0 agg.)	(Slovenia) Maribor	Prague, Czech Republic
20:00 CEST (UTC+2)	Bony 3'; Pamić (yellow card) 57'	Report		Stadium: Generali Arena; Attendance: 12,710; Referee: Aleksei Kulbakov (Belarus); Assistant referees: Viachaslau Bykov (Belarus), Stanislav Savitski (Belarus); Fourth official: Valery Vyalichka (Belarus)
Note: Sparta Prague won 3–0 on aggregate.

==== Group stage ====
Pos	Team	Pld	W	D	L	GF	GA	GD	Pts	Qualification	PSV	FCK	PRA	CLU
1	(Netherlands) PSV Eindhoven	6	4	2	0	8	3	+5	14	Advance to knockout phase	—	1–0	1–0	1–0
2	(Denmark) Copenhagen	6	3	1	2	7	4	+3	10	Advance to knockout phase	1–1	—	1–0	2–0
3	(Czech Republic) Sparta Prague	6	2	1	3	7	9	−2	7		2–2	0–3	—	2–0
4	(Romania) CFR Cluj	6	1	0	5	4	10	−6	3		0–2	2–0	2–3	—

Source: Soccerway

17 September 2009 1	Sparta Prague (Czech Republic)	2–2	(Netherlands) PSV Eindhoven	Prague, Czech Republic
21:05 CEST (UTC+2)	Řepka (yellow card) 63'; Hoheneder (yellow card) 69'; Hubník 76'; Zeman 87'; Bony (yellow card) 90+1'; Blažek (yellow card) 90+4'	Report	Ooijer (yellow card) 42'; Manolev (yellow card) 45+1'; Reis 80', 90+1' (pen.)	Stadium: Generali Arena; Attendance: 16,703; Referee: Dougie McDonald (Scotland); Assistant referees: William Conquer (Scotland), Graham Chambers (Scotland); Fourth official: Steven McLean (Scotland); Goal-line assistants: Alan Muir (Scotland), Steve Conroy (Scotland)

1 October 2009 2	Copenhagen (Denmark)	1–0	(Czech Republic) Sparta Prague	Copenhagen, Denmark
19:00 CEST (UTC+2)	N'Doye 25'	Report	Kušnír (yellow card) 32'	Stadium: Parken Stadium; Attendance: 15,043; Referee: Hannes Kaasik (Estonia); Assistant referees: Marko Leevand (Estonia), Hannes Reinvald (Estonia); Fourth official: Jaan Roos (Estonia); Goal-line assistants: Sten Kaldma (Estonia), Kristo Tohver (Estonia)

22 October 2009 3	Sparta Prague (Czech Republic)	2–0	(Romania) CFR Cluj	Prague, Czech Republic
19:00 CEST (UTC+2)	Kucka 15'; Hubník 32'; Kušnír (yellow card) 58'; Kalouda (yellow card) 68'	Report	Deac (yellow card) 16'; Traoré (yellow card) 38'; Cadú (yellow card) 45+2'; Nuno Claro (yellow card) 90+3'	Stadium: Generali Arena; Attendance: 10,134; Referee: Aleksei Nikolaev (Russia); Assistant referees: Ilya Baryshnikov (Russia), Vitali Drozdov (Russia); Fourth official: Stanislav Sukhina (Russia); Goal-line assistants: Maksim Layushkin (Russia), Sergei Karasev (Russia)

5 November 2009 4	CFR Cluj (Romania)	2–3	(Czech Republic) Sparta Prague	Cluj-Napoca, Romania
22:05 EET (UTC+2)	Traoré 25'; Mureșan (yellow card) 26' (yellow-red card) 64'; Cadú (yellow card) 43'; Mara (yellow card) 86' (yellow-red card) 88'; Dani (yellow card) 88'; Dubarbier (yellow card) 90+1'	Report	Holenda 6', 13'; Kucka (yellow card) 28'; Řepka (yellow card) 52'; Bony 90+5'	Stadium: Dr. Constantin Rădulescu Stadium; Attendance: 7,227; Referee: Selçuk Dereli (Turkey); Assistant referees: Erdinç Sezertam (Turkey), Emre Eyisoy (Turkey); Fourth official: Özgüç Türkalp (Turkey); Goal-line assistants: Fırat Aydınus (Turkey), Bülent Yıldırım (Turkey)

3 December 2009 5	PSV Eindhoven (Netherlands)	1–0	(Czech Republic) Sparta Prague	Eindhoven, Netherlands
19:00 CET (UTC+1)	Manolev (yellow card) 72'; Řepka 90+1' (o.g.)	Report	Řepka (yellow card) 15'; Bony (yellow card) 73'; Hušek (yellow card) 82'	Stadium: Philips Stadion; Attendance: 26,400; Referee: Martin Ingvarsson (Sweden); Assistant referees: Magnus Sjöblom (Sweden), Joakim Flink (Sweden); Fourth official: Magnus Ahlsèn (Sweden); Goal-line assistants: Daniel Stålhammar (Sweden), Michael Lerjéus (Sweden)

16 December 2009 6	Sparta Prague (Czech Republic)	0–3	(Denmark) Copenhagen	Prague, Czech Republic
21:05 CET (UTC+1)	Kušnír (yellow card) 25'; Pamić (yellow card) 42' (yellow-red card) 60'; Kucka (yellow card) 55'	Report	N'Doye 22', 30', (yellow card) 100'; Grønkjær 54' (pen.)	Stadium: Generali Arena; Attendance: 17,151; Referee: Sascha Kever (Switzerland); Assistant referees: Devis Dettamanti (Switzerland), Charles Helbling (Switzerland); Fourth official: Alain Bieri (Switzerland); Goal-line assistants: Carlo Bertolini (Switzerland), Bruno Grossen (Switzerland)
