= Estonia national football team results =

For lists of the Estonia national men football team's results see:

- Estonia national football team results (1920–1940)
- Estonia national football team results (1991–2009)
- Estonia national football team results (2010–2019)
- Estonia national football team results (2020–present)
