= Peter Mráz =

Peter Mráz may refer to:

- Peter Mráz (footballer, born 1985), Slovak football defender
- Peter Mráz (footballer, born 1975), Slovak football midfielder
