= Manuel Pamić =

Croatian footballer (born 1986)

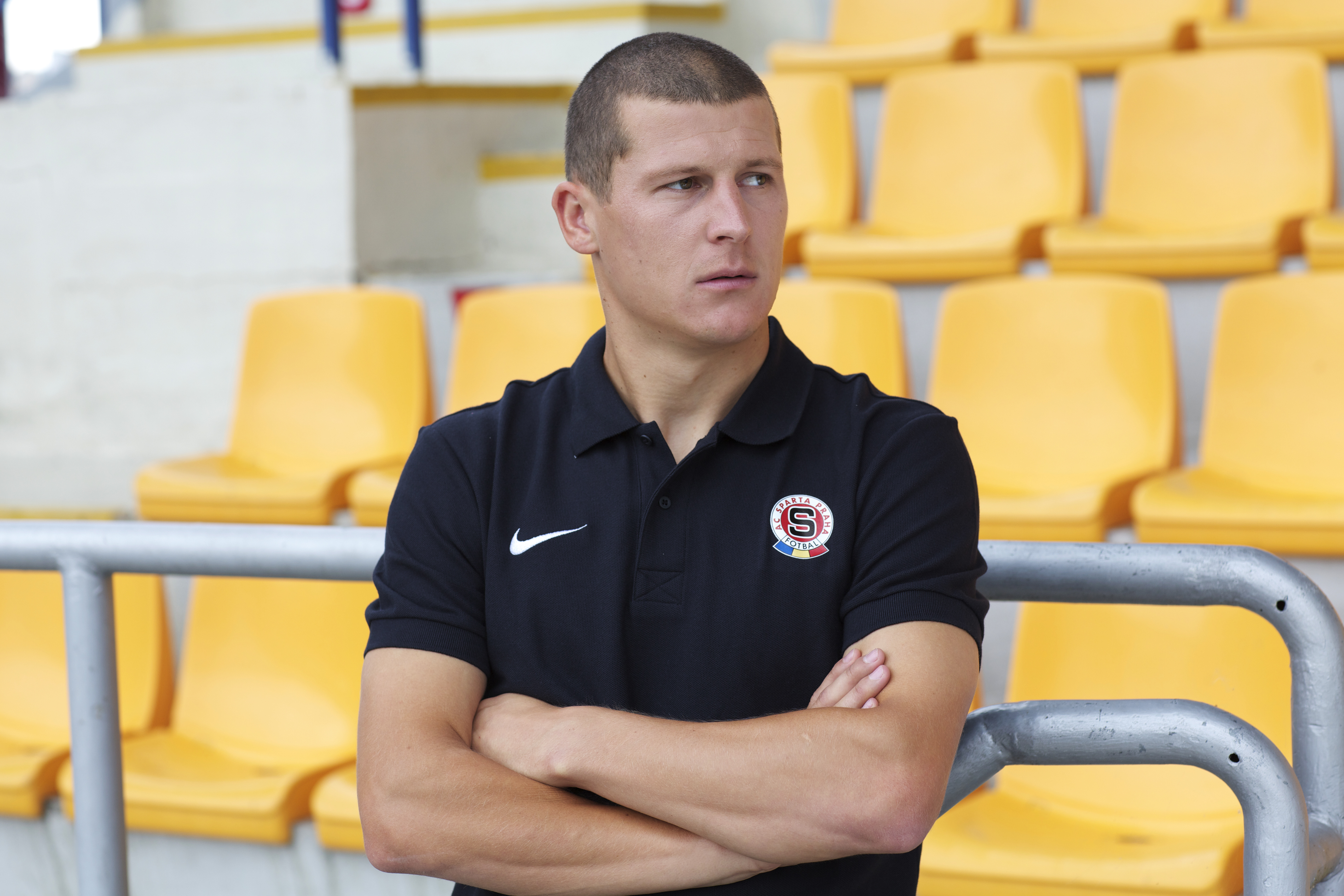
- Pamić with Sparta in 2009

Personal information
- Full name: Manuel Pamić
- Date of birth: 20 August 1986 (age 40)
- Place of birth: Žminj, SR Croatia, SFR Yugoslavia
- Height: 1.75 m (5 ft 9 in)
- Position: Left back

Team information
- Current team: Smoljanci Sloboda (Player-manager)

Youth career
- 1997–2002: Žminj
- 2002: Rovinj
- 2003–2004: Žminj

Senior career*
Years	Team	Apps	(Gls)
2004–2006	Istra 1961	43	(5)
2006–2008	Rijeka	38	(1)
2008–2009	Red Bull Salzburg	11	(0)
2009–2015	Sparta Prague	114	(4)
2013	→ Chievo (loan)	3	(0)
2014	→ Siena (loan)	0	(0)
2015	Frosinone	6	(0)
2015–2016	Istra 1961	9	(0)
2016–2017	Rovinj		
2017–2020	Novigrad		
2020	Rovinj		
2020–	Smoljanci Sloboda		

International career
2005	Croatia U19	4	(1)
2006–2007	Croatia U20	4	(0)
2005–2008	Croatia U21	13	(0)

Managerial career
- 2020–: Smoljanci Sloboda (player-manager)
- * Club domestic league appearances and goals

Manuel Pamić (born 20 August 1986) is a Croatian footballer who plays as a left back and is the current player-manager of Smoljanci Sloboda.

== Club career ==
=== Early career ===
Born in Žminj, Istria County, Pamić started his career in the youth ranks of local club NK Žminj, where he stayed until 2004 before moving to NK Istra 1961 at the age of 18. He impressed at the club and became a regular in the Pula squad. His talent was noticed and in 2006 he made a move in NK Rijeka.

=== Red Bull Salzburg ===
He played with Rijeka one year producing 9 assists and scoring one goal (claimed to be the "best goal of the season" by the Croatian media) in the match against Zadar before he moved on, due to a direct request of the Salzburg's coach Trapattoni, to the Austrian Red Bull Salzburg in December 2007 for a fee of €1m. When he moved in the Austrian Club Niko Kovač, the captain of Red Bull Salzburg and of the Croatia national football team declared: "I can only congratulate my team on making this signing. Manuel ranks as one of the best talents in this position and he is certain to be considered for the Croatia national team sooner or later. Pamic is highly skilled and is really able to create some pressure down the left side". With the Austrians he played 6 matches in the first half of the year, and another 4 the second. Concluding his Austrian experience with a total of 11 matches, between League and Cup, producing also 2 assists.

=== Sparta Praha ===
In January 2009 he was loaned to Sparta Prague, a year later Sparta purchased him. With the Czech club Pamić played very well producing many assists, whilst also scoring some goals with powerful shots from distance. With Sparta he collected a total of 162 caps scoring 6 goals.

=== Chievo Verona ===
In the summer transfer window of July 2013 he made a move to the Italian club Chievo. Pamić made his debut for Chievo on 17 August 2013 in an Italian's Cup match against Empoli. He made his debut in the League against Genoa, on 20 October 2013.

=== Siena ===
In the winter transfer window of January 2014, Pamić was loaned by Chievo to A.C. Siena.

== International career ==
He was a very active member of almost all the Croatian youth association football national teams, from Under 16 until the Under 19 youth selection. Pamić has also played with the Croatia national under-21 team, where he made a total of 7 appearances. He has become a regular call up for the Croatia national team, with whom he took part in the 2014 FIFA World Cup qualification. However, he has still not had a debut, under coach Slaven Bilić due to minor legal issues with his Manager and the Croatian HNS, Bilić has also called him for a starting team place in a match against Czech Republic in his native Pula where Pamić did not debut due to an injury, and time after under Igor Štimac, who has called up Pamić for much matches in 2014 FIFA World Cup qualification, but with Štimac has also can't debut due to still other injuries. Štimac had also call him for a lineup place in a friendly match against the Prva HNL- Selection, but Pamić had to postpone the debut, expressing his desire to stay with his pregnant wife. Manuel Pamić has also received a call up from Czech national football team, but has refused stating: "I'm honored from the Czech call up, and maybe is better for me to play for the Czechs, cause Croatia national team and Coach continues to ignore me, but I must to refuse cause Croatia is my homeland and I love it."

== Coaching career ==
After spells at amateur clubs in Croatia, Pamić was appointed manager of Smoljanci Sloboda at the end of September 2020. Pamić was also still active on the field, as he functioned as a player-coach.

== Career statistics ==
Club	Season	League			Cup			Europe			Total		
Club	Season	Apps	Goals	Assists	Apps	Goals	Assists	Apps	Goals	Assists	Apps	Goals	Assists
Istra 1961
Istra 1961	2005–06	30	4	0	0	0	0	0	0	0	30	4	0
Istra 1961	2006–07	13	1	0	0	0	0	0	0	0	13	1	0
Istra 1961	Total	43	5	0	0	0	0	0	0	0	43	5	0
Rijeka
Rijeka	2006–07	20	0	6	0	0	0	2	0	0	22	0	6
Rijeka	2007–08	18	1	3	0	0	0	0	0	0	18	1	3
Rijeka	Total	38	1	9	0	0	0	2	0	0	40	1	9
Red Bull Salzburg
Red Bull Salzburg	2007–08	6	0	1	0	0	0	0	0	0	6	0	1
Red Bull Salzburg	2008–09	4	0	1	1	0	0	0	0	0	5	0	1
Red Bull Salzburg	Total	10	0	2	1	0	0	0	0	0	11	0	2
Sparta Prague
Sparta Prague	2008–09	14	1	0	0	0	0	0	0	0	14	1	0
Sparta Prague	2009–10	26	0	2	1	0	0	9	0	2	34	0	4
Sparta Prague	2010–11	27	3	2	1	0	0	13	0	8	41	3	10
Sparta Prague	2011–12	28	0	7	6	1	0	4	1	0	38	2	7
Sparta Prague	2012–13	19	0	2	5	0	0	9	0	0	33	0	2
Sparta Prague	Total	114	4	13	13	1	0	35	1	10	162	6	23
Chievo Verona
Chievo Verona	2013–14	3	0	0	3	0	0	0	0	0	6	0	0
Chievo Verona	Total	3	0	0	3	0	0	0	0	0	6	0	0
Siena
Siena	2013–14	0	0	0	0	0	0	0	0	0	0	0	0
Siena	Total	0	0	0	0	0	0	0	0	0	0	0	0
Career totals		208	10	24	17	1	0	37	1	10	262	12	34

== Honours ==
=== Club ===
Sparta Praha

- Gambrinus Liga (1): 2009–10
- Czech Supercup (1): 2010
