= Estonia national football team results (2020–present) =

This article provides details of international football games played by the Estonia national football team from 2020 to present.

== Results ==
Key
Win
Draw
Defeat

=== 2020 ===
26 March 2020 Friendly	Estonia	Cancelled	New Caledonia	Tallinn, Estonia
19:00 UTC+2				Stadium: Lilleküla Stadium

31 March 2020 Friendly	Estonia	Cancelled	Lithuania	Tallinn, Estonia
18:00 UTC+3				Stadium: Lilleküla Stadium

1 June 2020 Friendly	Mongolia	Cancelled	Estonia	Ulaanbaatar, Mongolia
15:00 UTC+8				Stadium: National Sports Stadium

7 June 2020 Friendly	Finland	Cancelled	Estonia	Tampere, Finland
15:00 UTC+3				Stadium: Tampere Stadium

5 September 2020 2020–21 UEFA Nations League C	Estonia	0–1	Georgia	Tallinn, Estonia
19:00 UTC+3		Report	Kacharava 32'	Stadium: Lilleküla Stadium; Attendance: 0 (Note: Due to the COVID-19 pandemic in Europe, all matches scheduled for September 2020 were played behind closed doors.); Referee: Donatas Rumšas (Lithuania)

8 September 2020 2020–21 UEFA Nations League C	Armenia	2–0	Estonia	Yerevan, Armenia
20:00 UTC+4	Karapetian 43'; Wbeymar 65'	Report		Stadium: Vazgen Sargsyan Republican Stadium; Attendance: 0 Referee: David Coote (England)

7 October 2020 Friendly	Estonia	1–3	Lithuania	Tallinn, Estonia
19:00 UTC+2	Marin 58'	Report	Novikovas 14', 46'; Sirgėdas 32'	Stadium: Lilleküla Stadium; Attendance: 718; Referee: Antti Munukka (Finland)

11 October 2020 2020–21 UEFA Nations League C	Estonia	3–3	North Macedonia	Tallinn, Estonia
19:00 UTC+3	Sappinen 33', 61'; Liivak 76' (pen.)	Report	Kuusk 3' (o.g.); Pandev 80'; Zajkov 88'	Stadium: Lilleküla Stadium; Attendance: 908; Referee: Mohammed Al-Hakim (Sweden)

14 October 2020 2020–21 UEFA Nations League C	Estonia	1–1	Armenia	Tallinn, Estonia
21:45 UTC+3	Sappinen 14'	Report	K. Hovhannisyan 8'	Stadium: Lilleküla Stadium; Attendance: 1,007; Referee: Luis Godinho (Portugal)

11 November 2020 Friendly	Italy	4–0	Estonia	Benevento, Italy
20:45 UTC+1	Grifo 14', 75' (pen.); Bernardeschi 27'; Orsolini 86' (pen.)	Report		Stadium: Stadio Ciro Vigorito; Attendance: 0 Referee: Rade Obrenovič (Slovenia)

15 November 2020 2020–21 UEFA Nations League C	North Macedonia	2–1	Estonia	Skopje, North Macedonia
15:00 UTC+1	Trichkovski 29'; Stojanovski 68'	Report	Sappinen 52'	Stadium: Toše Proeski Arena; Attendance: 0 Referee: Marius Avram (Romania)

18 November 2020 2020–21 UEFA Nations League C	Georgia	0–0	Estonia	Tbilisi, Georgia
21:00 UTC+4		Report		Stadium: Boris Paichadze Dinamo Arena; Attendance: 0 Referee: Irfan Peljto (Bosnia and Herzegovina)

=== 2021 ===
24 March 2021 2022 FIFA World Cup qualification	Estonia	2–6	Czech Republic	Lublin, Poland
21:45 UTC+2	Sappinen 12'; Anier 86'	Report	Schick 18'; Barák 27'; Souček 32', 43', 48'; Jankto 56'	Stadium: Arena Lublin; Attendance: 0 Referee: Anastasios Papapetrou (Greece)

27 March 2021 2022 FIFA World Cup qualification	Belarus	4–2	Estonia	Minsk, Belarus
20:00 UTC+3	Lisakovich 45' (pen.), 84'; Kendysh 64'; Savitski 81'	Report	Anier 31', 55'	Stadium: Dinamo Stadium; Attendance: 3,611; Referee: Robert Hennessy (Ireland)

31 March 2021 Friendly	Sweden	1–0	Estonia	Solna, Sweden
17:45 UTC+2	Berg 3'	Report		Stadium: Friends Arena; Attendance: 0 Referee: Marco Fritz (Germany)

1 June 2021 2020 Baltic Cup	Lithuania	0–1	Estonia	Vilnius, Lithuania
18:00 UTC+2		Report	Anier 59'	Stadium: LFF Stadium; Attendance: 632; Referee: Aleksandrs Anufrijevs (Latvia)

4 June 2021 Friendly	Finland	0–1	Estonia	Helsinki, Finland
19:00 UTC+3		Report	Sappinen 59' (pen.)	Stadium: Helsinki Olympic Stadium; Attendance: 1,250; Referee: Jørgen Burchardt (Denmark)

10 June 2021 2020 Baltic Cup	Estonia	2–1	Latvia	Tallinn, Estonia
19:00 UTC+3	Käit 5', 40'	Report	Ikaunieks 84' (pen.)	Stadium: Lilleküla Stadium; Attendance: 740; Referee: Robertas Valikonis (Latvia)

2 September 2021 2022 FIFA World Cup qualification	Estonia	2–5	Belgium	Tallinn, Estonia
21:45 UTC+3	Käit 2'; Sorga 83'	Report	Vanaken 22'; Lukaku 29', 52'; Witsel 65'; Foket 76'	Stadium: Lilleküla Stadium; Attendance: 6,685; Referee: Guillermo Cuadra Fernández (Spain)

5 September 2021 Friendly	Estonia	0–1	Northern Ireland	Tallinn, Estonia
19:00 UTC+3		Report	Ferguson 75'	Stadium: Lilleküla Stadium; Attendance: 2,524; Referee: Mads-Kristoffer Kristoffersen (Denmark)

8 September 2021 2022 FIFA World Cup qualification	Wales	0–0	Estonia	Cardiff, Wales
19:45 UTC+1		Report		Stadium: Cardiff City Stadium; Attendance: 21,624; Referee: Ruddy Buquet (France)

8 October 2021 2022 FIFA World Cup qualification	Estonia	2–0	Belarus	Tallinn, Estonia
21:45 UTC+3	Sorga 58'; Zenjov 90+3'	Report		Stadium: Lilleküla Stadium; Attendance: 3,597; Referee: Mohammed Al-Hakim (Sweden)

11 October 2021 2022 FIFA World Cup qualification	Estonia	0–1	Wales	Tallinn, Estonia
21:45 UTC+3		Report	Moore 12'	Stadium: Lilleküla Stadium; Attendance: 5,118; Referee: Sandro Schärer (Switzerland)

13 November 2021 2022 FIFA World Cup qualification	Belgium	3–1	Estonia	Brussels, Belgium
20:45 UTC+1	Benteke 11'; Carrasco 53'; Hazard 74'	Report	Sorga 70'	Stadium: King Baudouin Stadium; Attendance: 29,865; Referee: Halil Umut Meler (Turkey)

16 November 2021 2022 FIFA World Cup qualification	Czech Republic	2–0	Estonia	Prague, Czech Republic
20:45 UTC+1	Brabec 59'; Sýkora 85'	Report		Stadium: Stadion Letná; Attendance: 10,076; Referee: Orel Grinfeld (Israel)

=== 2022 ===
24 March 2022 2020–21 UEFA Nations League C	Estonia	0–0	Cyprus	Tallinn, Estonia
19:00 (UTC+2)		Report		Stadium: A. Le Coq Arena; Attendance: 5,366; Referee: William Collum (Scotland)

29 March 2022 2020–21 UEFA Nations League C	Cyprus	2–0 (2–0 agg.)	Estonia	Larnaca, Cyprus
19:00 (UTC+3)	Tzionis 19'; Sotiriou 51'	Report		Stadium: AEK Arena – Georgios Karapatakis; Attendance: 2,464; Referee: Artur Dias (Portugal)
Note: Cyprus won 2–0 on aggregate and remained in League C, while Estonia were relegated to League D.

2 June 2022 2022–23 UEFA Nations League D	Estonia	2–0	San Marino	Tallinn, Estonia
19:00 (UTC+3)	Kirss 24'; Tamm 32'	Report		Stadium: A. Le Coq Arena; Attendance: 3,533; Referee: Ioannis Papadopoulos (Greece)

5 June 2022 Friendly	Argentina	5–0	Estonia	Pamplona, Spain
20:00 (UTC+2)	Messi 8' (pen.), 45', 47', 71', 76'	Report		Stadium: El Sadar Stadium; Attendance: 18,332; Referee: Urs Schnyder (Switzerland)

9 June 2022 2022–23 UEFA Nations League D	Malta	1–2	Estonia	Ta' Qali, Malta
20:45 (UTC+2)	Hein 56' (o.g.)	Report	Vassiljev 21'; Anier 90+4'	Stadium: Ta' Qali National Stadium; Attendance: 3,422; Referee: Bobby Madden (Scotland)

13 June 2022 Friendly	Albania	0–0	Estonia	Tirana, Albania
19:00 (UTC+2)		Report		Stadium: Air Albania Stadium; Attendance: 1,000; Referee: Philip Farrugia (Malta)

23 September 2022 2022–23 UEFA Nations League D	Estonia	2–1	Malta	Tallinn, Estonia
19:00 (UTC+3)	Sappinen 45+6' (pen.); Anier 86'	Report	Teuma 51' (pen.)	Stadium: A. Le Coq Arena; Attendance: 5,539; Referee: Daniel Siebert (Germany)

26 September 2022 2022–23 UEFA Nations League D	San Marino	0–4	Estonia	Serravalle, San Marino
20:45 (UTC+2)		Report	Anier 38', 78'; Teniste 56'; Sappinen 66'	Stadium: San Marino Stadium; Attendance: 608; Referee: Kateryna Monzul (Ukraine)

16 November 2022 2022 Baltic Cup	Latvia	1–1 (5–3 p)	Estonia	Riga, Latvia
19:00 (UTC+2)	Krollis 45+2'	Report	Zenjov 2'	Stadium: Daugava Stadium; Attendance: 1,657; Referee: Robertas Valikonis (Lithuania)
	Penalties
	J. Ikaunieks (penalty scored); Zjuzins (penalty scored); Jaunzems (penalty scored); D. Ikaunieks (penalty scored); Stuglis (penalty scored)		(penalty scored) Mets; (penalty scored) Vassiljev; (penalty missed) Zenjov; (penalty scored) Sorga

19 November 2022 2022 Baltic Cup	Estonia	2–0	Lithuania	Tallinn, Estonia
16:00 (UTC+2)	Zenjov 65'; Peetson 89'	Report		Stadium: A. Le Coq Arena; Attendance: 1,563; Referee: Vitalijs Spasjonņikovs (Latvia)

=== 2023 ===
8 January 2023 Friendly	Iceland	1–1	Estonia	Albufeira, Portugal
17:00 (UTC±0)	Guðjohnsen 90' (pen.)	Report	Zenjov 44'	Stadium: Estadio da Nora; Attendance: 50; Referee: Miguel Nogueira (Portugal)

12 January 2023 Friendly	Finland	0–1	Estonia	Albufeira, Portugal
16:00 (UTC±0)		Report	Miller 84'	Stadium: Estadio da Nora; Attendance: 300; Referee: Gustavo Correia (Portugal)

23 March 2023 Friendly	Hungary	1–0	Estonia	Budapest, Hungary
19:30 (UTC+1)	Ádám 41'	Report		Stadium: Puskás Aréna; Attendance: 37,804; Referee: Walter Altmann (Austria)

27 March 2023 UEFA Euro 2024 qualifying	Austria	2–1	Estonia	Linz, Austria
20:45 (UTC+2)	Kainz 68'; Gregoritsch 88'	Report	Sappinen 25'	Stadium: Raiffeisen Arena; Attendance: 16,500; Referee: Enea Jorgji (Albania)

17 June 2023 UEFA Euro 2024 qualifying	Azerbaijan	1–1	Estonia	Baku, Azerbaijan
20:00 (UTC+4)	Kryvotsyuk 62'	Report	Sappinen 27'	Stadium: Dalga Arena; Attendance: 3,900; Referee: Ondřej Berka (Czech Republic)

20 June 2023 UEFA Euro 2024 qualifying	Estonia	0–3	Belgium	Tallinn, Estonia
21:45 (UTC+3)		Report	Lukaku 37', 40'; Bakayoko 90'	Stadium: A. Le Coq Arena; Attendance: 11,772; Referee: John Beaton (Scotland)

9 September 2023 UEFA Euro 2024 qualifying	Estonia	0–5	Sweden	Tallinn, Estonia
19:00 (UTC+3)		Report	Gyökeres 18'; Kulusevski 24'; Isak 39'; Quaison 75'; Claesson 90+2'	Stadium: A. Le Coq Arena; Attendance: 11,411; Referee: Horațiu Feșnic (Romania)

12 September 2023 UEFA Euro 2024 qualifying	Belgium	5–0	Estonia	Brussels, Belgium
20:45 (UTC+2)	Vertonghen 4'; Trossard 18'; Lukaku 56', 58'; De Ketelaere 88'	Report		Stadium: King Baudouin Stadium; Attendance: 25,500; Referee: Bartosz Frankowski (Poland)

13 October 2023 UEFA Euro 2024 qualifying	Estonia	0–2	Azerbaijan	Tallinn, Estonia
19:00 (UTC+3)		Report	Bayramov 9'; Sheydaev 45+4' (pen.)	Stadium: A. Le Coq Arena; Attendance: 5,652; Referee: Robert Schröder (Germany)

17 October 2023 Friendly	Estonia	1–1	Thailand	Tallinn, Estonia
19:00 (UTC+3)	Anier 71'	Report	Praisuwan 76'	Stadium: A. Le Coq Arena; Attendance: 1,502; Referee: Trustin Farrugia Cann (Malta)

16 November 2023 UEFA Euro 2024 qualifying	Estonia	0–2	Austria	Tallinn, Estonia
19:00 (UTC+2)		Report	Laimer 26'; Lienhart 40'	Stadium: A. Le Coq Arena; Attendance: 4,488; Referee: Nikola Dabanović (Montenegro)

19 November 2023 UEFA Euro 2024 qualifying	Sweden	2–0	Estonia	Solna, Sweden
18:00 (UTC+1)	Claesson 22'; Forsberg 55'	Report		Stadium: Friends Arena; Attendance: 11,201; Referee: Fabio Maresca (Italy)

=== 2024 ===
12 January 2024 Friendly	Sweden	2–1	Estonia	Paphos, Cyprus
20:00 (UTC+2)	Nanasi 30'; Kiese Thelin 54'	Report	Palumets 19'	Stadium: Stelios Kyriakides Stadium; Attendance: 100; Referee: Kyriakos Athanasiou (Cyprus)

21 March 2024 UEFA Euro 2024 qualifying play-offs	Poland	5–1	Estonia	Warsaw, Poland
20:45 (UTC+1)	Frankowski 22'; Zieliński 50'; Piotrowski 70'; Mets 74' (o.g.); S. Szymański 76'	Report	Vetkal 78'	Stadium: Stadion Narodowy; Attendance: 53,868; Referee: Slavko Vinčić (Slovenia)

26 March 2024 Friendly	Finland	2–1	Estonia	Helsinki, Finland
19:00 (UTC+2)	F. Jensen 30'; Hein 38' (o.g.)	Report	A. Tamm 62'	Stadium: Helsinki Olympic Stadium; Attendance: 12,559; Referee: Mads Kristoffersen (Denmark)

4 June 2024 Friendly	Switzerland	4–0	Estonia	Lucerne, Switzerland
20:15 (UTC+2)	Zuber 20'; Amdouni 47'; Elvedi 63'; Shaqiri 70' (pen.)	Report		Stadium: Swissporarena; Attendance: 14,473; Referee: Kyriakos Athanasiou (Cyprus)

8 June 2024 2024 Baltic Cup	Estonia	4–1	Faroe Islands	Tallinn, Estonia
19:00 (UTC+3)	Tamm 43'; Anier 50'; Tur 83'; Kuraksin 89'	Report	Knudsen 24'	Stadium: A. Le Coq Arena; Attendance: 3,919; Referee: Robertas Valikonis (Lithuania)

11 June 2024 2024 Baltic Cup	Lithuania	1–1 (3–4 p)	Estonia	Kaunas, Lithuania
19:00 (UTC+3)	Matulevičius 84'	Report	Lepik 82'	Stadium: Darius and Girėnas Stadium; Attendance: 5,900; Referee: Andris Treimanis (Latvia)
	Penalties
	Lasickas (penalty missed); Černych (penalty missed); Tutyškinas (penalty scored); Novikovas (penalty scored); Klimavičius (penalty scored)		(penalty scored) Mets; (penalty scored) Lepik; (penalty scored) Palumets; (penalty missed) Sorga; (penalty scored) Vetkal

5 September 2024 2024–25 UEFA Nations League C	Estonia	0–1	Slovakia	Tallinn, Estonia
21:45 (UTC+3)		Report	Suslov 70'	Stadium: A. Le Coq Arena; Attendance: 6,128; Referee: Matej Jug (Slovenia)

8 September 2024 2024–25 UEFA Nations League C	Sweden	3–0	Estonia	Stockholm, Sweden
20:45 (UTC+2)	Gyökeres 30', 44'; Isak 40'	Report		Stadium: Strawberry Arena; Attendance: 14,858; Referee: Sven Jablonski (Germany)

11 October 2024 2024–25 UEFA Nations League C	Estonia	3–1	Azerbaijan	Tallinn, Estonia
19:00 (UTC+3)	Yakovlev 32'; Sinyavskiy 45+2'; Shein 71'	Report	Bayramov 45+1' (pen.)	Stadium: A. Le Coq Arena; Attendance: 6,034; Referee: Rob Harvey (Republic of Ireland)

14 October 2024 2024–25 UEFA Nations League C	Estonia	0–3	Sweden	Tallinn, Estonia
21:45 (UTC+3)		Report	Nanasi 29', 37'; Gyökeres 66'	Stadium: A. Le Coq Arena; Attendance: 4,706; Referee: Juxhin Xhaja (Albania)

16 November 2024 2024–25 UEFA Nations League C	Azerbaijan	0–0	Estonia	Gabala, Azerbaijan
18:00 (UTC+4)		Report		Stadium: Gabala City Stadium; Attendance: 1,600; Referee: John Beaton (Scotland)

19 November 2024 2024–25 UEFA Nations League C	Slovakia	1–0	Estonia	Trnava, Slovakia
20:45 (UTC+1)	Strelec 72'	Report		Stadium: Anton Malatinský Stadium; Attendance: 4,317; Referee: Mikkel Redder (Denmark)

=== 2025 ===
22 March 2025 2026 FIFA World Cup qualification	Israel	2–1	Estonia	Debrecen, Hungary
20:45 (UTC+1)	Hein 23' (o.g.); Dasa 75'	Report	Paskotši 10'	Stadium: Nagyerdei Stadium; Attendance: 270; Referee: Nikola Dabanović (Montenegro)

25 March 2025 2026 FIFA World Cup qualification	Moldova	2–3	Estonia	Chișinău, Moldova
19:00 (UTC+2)	Nicolaescu 67'; Caimacov 90+1'	Report	Peetson 19'; Sappinen 30'; Käit 70'	Stadium: Zimbru Stadium; Attendance: 6,112; Referee: Lawrence Visser (Belgium)

6 June 2025 2026 FIFA World Cup qualification	Estonia	1–3	Israel	Tallinn, Estonia
21:45 (UTC+3)	Käit 31'	Report	Biton 39', 49'; Abu Fani 90' (pen.)	Stadium: A. Le Coq Arena; Attendance: 5,967; Referee: Willy Delajod (France)

9 June 2025 2026 FIFA World Cup qualification	Estonia	0–1	Norway	Tallinn, Estonia
21:45 (UTC+3)		Report	Haaland 62'	Stadium: A. Le Coq Arena; Attendance: 11,577; Referee: Srđan Jovanović (Serbia)

5 September 2025 2026 FIFA World Cup qualification	Italy	5–0	Estonia	Bergamo, Italy
20:45 (UTC+2)	Kean 58'; Retegui 69', 89'; Raspadori 71'; Bastoni 90+2'	Report		Stadium: Stadio di Bergamo; Attendance: 22,559; Referee: João Pinheiro (Portugal)

9 September 2025 Friendly	Estonia	0–0	Andorra	Tallinn, Estonia
19:00 (UTC+3)		Report		Stadium: A. Le Coq Arena; Attendance: 4,641; Referee: Oliver Reitala (Finland)

11 October 2025 2026 FIFA World Cup qualification	Estonia	1–3	Italy	Tallinn, Estonia
21:45 (UTC+3)	Sappinen 76'	Report	Kean 5'; Retegui 38'; Esposito 74'	Stadium: A. Le Coq Arena; Attendance: 11,913; Referee: Serdar Gözübüyük (Netherlands)

14 October 2025 2026 FIFA World Cup qualification	Estonia	1–1	Moldova	Tallinn, Estonia
19:00 (UTC+3)	Käit 12'	Report	Bodișteanu 64'	Stadium: A. Le Coq Arena; Attendance: 4,731; Referee: Igor Pajač (Croatia)

13 November 2025 2026 FIFA World Cup qualification	Norway	4–1	Estonia	Oslo, Norway
18:00 (UTC+1)	Sørloth 50', 52'; Haaland 56', 62'	Report	Saarma 64'	Stadium: Ullevaal Stadion; Attendance: 25,493; Referee: Matej Jug (Slovenia)

18 November 2025 Friendly	Cyprus	2–4	Estonia	Limassol, Cyprus
19:00 (UTC+2)	Andreou 16'; Kakoullis 48'	Report	Kyprianou 44' (o.g.); Sappinen 78', 83', 87'	Stadium: Alphamega Stadium; Referee: Orel Grinfeeld (Israel)

=== 2026 ===
27 March 2026 2026 FIFA Series	Kenya	1–1 (4–5 p)	Estonia	Kigali, Rwanda
18:00 (UTC+2)	Ogam 51'	Report	Tammik 21'	Stadium: Amahoro Stadium; Referee: Georges Gatogato (Burundi)
	Penalties
	A. Odhiambo (penalty scored); Bajaber (penalty missed); Ouma (penalty scored); Erambo (penalty scored); Omondi (penalty scored); Odada (penalty missed)		(penalty scored) Tõugjas; (penalty missed) Yakovlev; (penalty scored) Schjønning-Larsen; (penalty scored) Tamm; (penalty scored) Sappinen; (penalty scored) Soomets

30 March 2026 2026 FIFA Series	Rwanda	2–0	Estonia	Kigali, Rwanda
19:30 (UTC+2)	Biramahire 30'; L. Mickels 51'	Report		Stadium: Amahoro Stadium; Referee: Ahmed Hassan Hussein (Somalia)

6 June 2026 2026 Baltic Cup	Estonia	1–0	Faroe Islands	Pärnu, Estonia
18:00 (UTC+3)	Varjund 66'	Report		Stadium: Pärnu Rannastaadion; Attendance: 1,543; Referee: Kristaps Ratnieks (Latvia)

9 June 2026 2026 Baltic Cup	Estonia	1–0	Lithuania	Tallinn, Estonia
19:00 (UTC+3)	Mustmaa 80'	Report		Stadium: A. Le Coq Arena; Attendance: 3,613; Referee: Vitālijs Spasjonņikovs (Latvia)

26 September 2026 2026–27 UEFA Nations League C	Iceland	1–1	Estonia	Reykjavik, Iceland
16:00 (UTC±0)	Guðjohnsen 45'	Report	Paskotši 64'	Stadium: Laugardalsvöllur; Attendance: 5,300; Referee: Miloš Milanović (Serbia)

29 September 2026 2026–27 UEFA Nations League C	Bulgaria	0–0	Estonia	Plovdiv, Bulgaria
21:45 (UTC+3)		Report		Stadium: Hristo Botev Stadium; Attendance: 960; Referee: Goga Kikacheishvili (Georgia)

3 October 2026 2026–27 UEFA Nations League C	Estonia	1–0	Luxembourg	Tallinn, Estonia
19:00 (UTC+3)	Peetson 5'	Report		Stadium: A. Le Coq Arena; Attendance: 7,211; Referee: Paweł Raczkowski (Poland)

6 October 2026 2026–27 UEFA Nations League C	Estonia	0–0	Iceland	Tallinn, Estonia
21:45 (UTC+3)		Report		Stadium: A. Le Coq Arena; Attendance: 5,987; Referee: David Dickinson (Scotland)

13 November 2026 2026–27 UEFA Nations League C	Luxembourg	0–1	Estonia	Luxembourg City, Luxembourg
20:45 (UTC+1)		Report	Paskotši 42'	Stadium: Stade de Luxembourg; Attendance: 9,214; Referee: Ishmael Barbara (Malta)

16 November 2026 2026–27 UEFA Nations League C	Estonia	2–1	Bulgaria	Tallinn, Estonia
19:00 (UTC+2)	Kristal 8'; Palumets 60'	Report	Kovachev 45+1'	Stadium: A. Le Coq Arena; Attendance: 8,006; Referee: Nenad Minaković (Serbia)

== See also ==
- Estonia national football team results (1920–1940)
- Estonia national football team results (1991–2009)
- Estonia national football team results (2010–2019)
- Estonia national football team records and statistics
