= Václav Kadlec =

Czech footballer (born 1992)

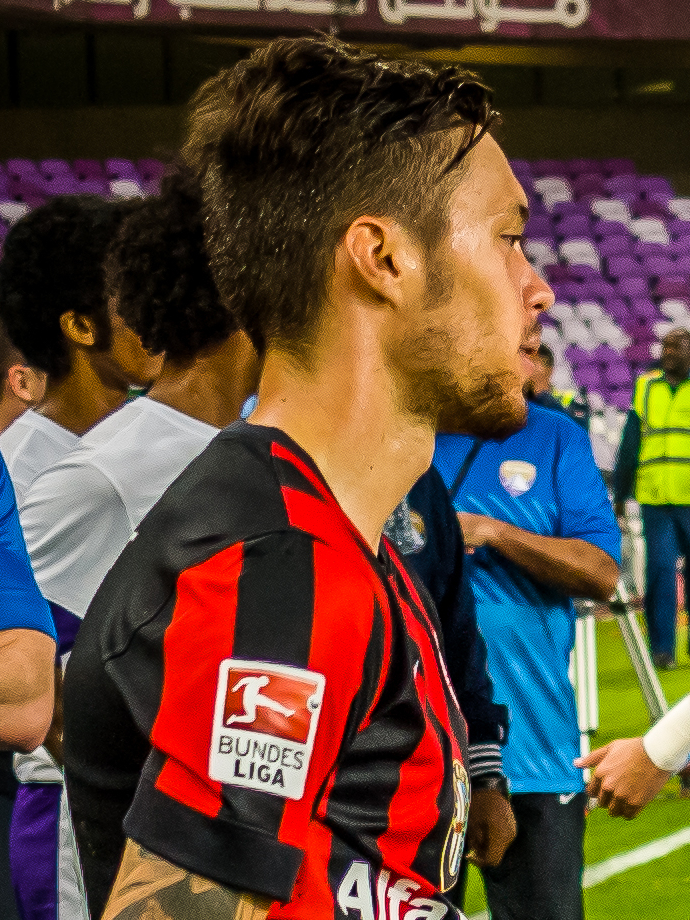
- Kadlec with Eintracht Frankfurt in 2015

Personal information
- Date of birth: 20 May 1992 (age 34)
- Place of birth: Prague, Czechoslovakia
- Height: 1.81 m (5 ft 11 in)
- Position: Forward

Team information
- Current team: Ligmet Milín
- Number: 14

Youth career
- 1997–2008: Bohemians 1905

Senior career*
Years	Team	Apps	(Gls)
2008–2013	Sparta Prague	111	(32)
2013–2015	Eintracht Frankfurt	30	(6)
2015	→ Sparta Prague (loan)	13	(9)
2016	FC Midtjylland	13	(3)
2016–2020	Sparta Prague	38	(9)
2021	Mladá Boleslav	2	(0)
2022	Jablonec	9	(0)
2022–2023	Viktoria Žižkov	12	(1)
2023–	Ligmet Milín	0	(0)
Total		228	(60)

International career
2008	Czech Republic U16	2	(1)
2007–2009	Czech Republic U17	26	(18)
2009	Czech Republic U18	2	(0)
2010	Czech Republic U19	3	(1)
2010–2015	Czech Republic U21	14	(7)
2010–2020	Czech Republic	15	(4)

Managerial career
- 2024: Viktoria Žižkov (assistant)
- * Club domestic league appearances and goals

Václav Kadlec (born 20 May 1992) is a Czech former professional footballer who played as a forward.

== Club career ==
=== Early club career ===
Kadlec made his debut in the Czech First League on 25 October 2008 for Sparta Prague against 1. FK Příbram. He scored his first league goal at the age of 16. Kadlec had a trial at Liverpool's academy in 2007. In November 2012 Kadlec fractured his skull in a collision with Martin Nešpor during Sparta Prague's match against Mladá Boleslav. On 18 August 2013, Kadlec joined Eintracht Frankfurt for an undisclosed fee, signing a contract due to expire in the summer of 2017.

=== Midtylland and return to Sparta Prague ===
After a short loan at Letná, Kadlec transferred to Danish club FC Midtjylland during the 2015–16 Danish Superliga. However, he decided to return to Sparta Prague in the summer transfer window of 2016. He signed a four-year contract with the club.

On 29 September 2016, with Sparta Prague, Kadlec scored twice in the 3–1 victory against Inter Milan in Europa League.

=== Retirement and brief return ===
In February 2020, Kadlec announced his retirement from playing due to persistent knee injuries. However, he joined Viktoria Žižkov on 2 September 2022. In August 2023, Kadlec joined TJ Ligmet Milín.

== International career ==
On 12 October 2010, Kadlec scored on his debut for the Czech Republic national team against Liechtenstein, becoming the youngest goalscorer in the Czech Republic national team history.

== Coaching career ==
In January 2024, Kadlec was appointed second assistant coach at Viktoria Žižkov.

== Career statistics ==
=== Club ===
Appearances and goals by club, season and competition
Club	Season	League			Cup		Europe		Other		Total	
Club	Season	Division	Apps	Goals	Apps	Goals	Apps	Goals	Apps	Goals	Apps	Goals
Sparta Prague	2008–09	Czech First League	12	2	3	1	0	0	–		15	3
Sparta Prague	2009–10	Czech First League	29	6	5	2	9	0	–		43	8
Sparta Prague	2010–11	Czech First League	25	4	1	0	11	3	1	0	38	7
Sparta Prague	2011–12	Czech First League	14	3	4	2	4	0	–		22	5
Sparta Prague	2012–13	Czech First League	26	14	4	2	10	4	–		40	20
Sparta Prague	2013–14	Czech First League	5	3	0	0	2	0	–		7	3
Sparta Prague	Total		111	32	17	7	36	7	1	0	165	46
Eintracht Frankfurt	2013–14	Bundesliga	21	5	3	1	5	2	–		29	8
Eintracht Frankfurt	2014–15	Bundesliga	4	1	1	1	–		–		5	2
Eintracht Frankfurt	2015–16	Bundesliga	5	0	0	0	–		–		5	0
Eintracht Frankfurt	Total		30	6	4	2	5	2	0	0	39	10
Sparta Prague (loan)	2014–15	Czech First League	13	9	1	1	–		–		14	10
FC Midtjylland	2015–16	Danish Superliga	6	0	0	0	2	0	–		8	0
FC Midtjylland	2016–17	Danish Superliga	7	3	0	0	8	0	–		15	3
FC Midtjylland	Total		13	3	0	0	10	0	0	0	23	3
Sparta Prague	2016–17	Czech First League	15	3	1	0	3	2	–		19	5
Sparta Prague	2017–18	Czech First League	21	6	1	0	1	0	–		23	6
Sparta Prague	2018–19	Czech First League	2	0	0	0	0	0	–		2	0
Sparta Prague	Total		38	9	2	0	4	2	0	0	44	11
Mladá Boleslav	2021–22	Czech First League	2	0	0	0	–		–		2	0
Jablonec	2021–22	Czech First League	7	0	0	0	–		–		7	0
Jablonec	2022–23	Czech First League	2	0	0	0	–		–		2	0
Jablonec	Total		9	0	0	0	0	0	0	0	9	0
Viktoria Žižkov	2022–23	Bohemian Football League B	12	1			–		–		12	1
Career total			228	60	24	10	55	11	1	0	308	81

=== International ===
Scores and results list Czech Republic's goal tally first, score column indicates score after each Kadlec goal.

List of international goals scored by Václav Kadlec
No.	Date	Venue	Opponent	Score	Result	Competition
1	12 October 2010	Rheinpark Stadion, Vaduz, Liechtenstein	Liechtenstein	2–0	2–0	UEFA Euro 2012 qualification
2	11 October 2013	Ta' Qali National Stadium, Ta' Qali, Malta	Malta	3–1	4–1	2014 FIFA World Cup qualification
3	31 August 2016	Městský stadion, Mladá Boleslav, Czech Republic	Armenia	2–0	3–0	Friendly
4	8 October 2017	Doosan Arena, Plzeň, Czech Republic	San Marino	5–0	5–0	2018 FIFA World Cup qualification
