= Estonia national football team records and statistics =

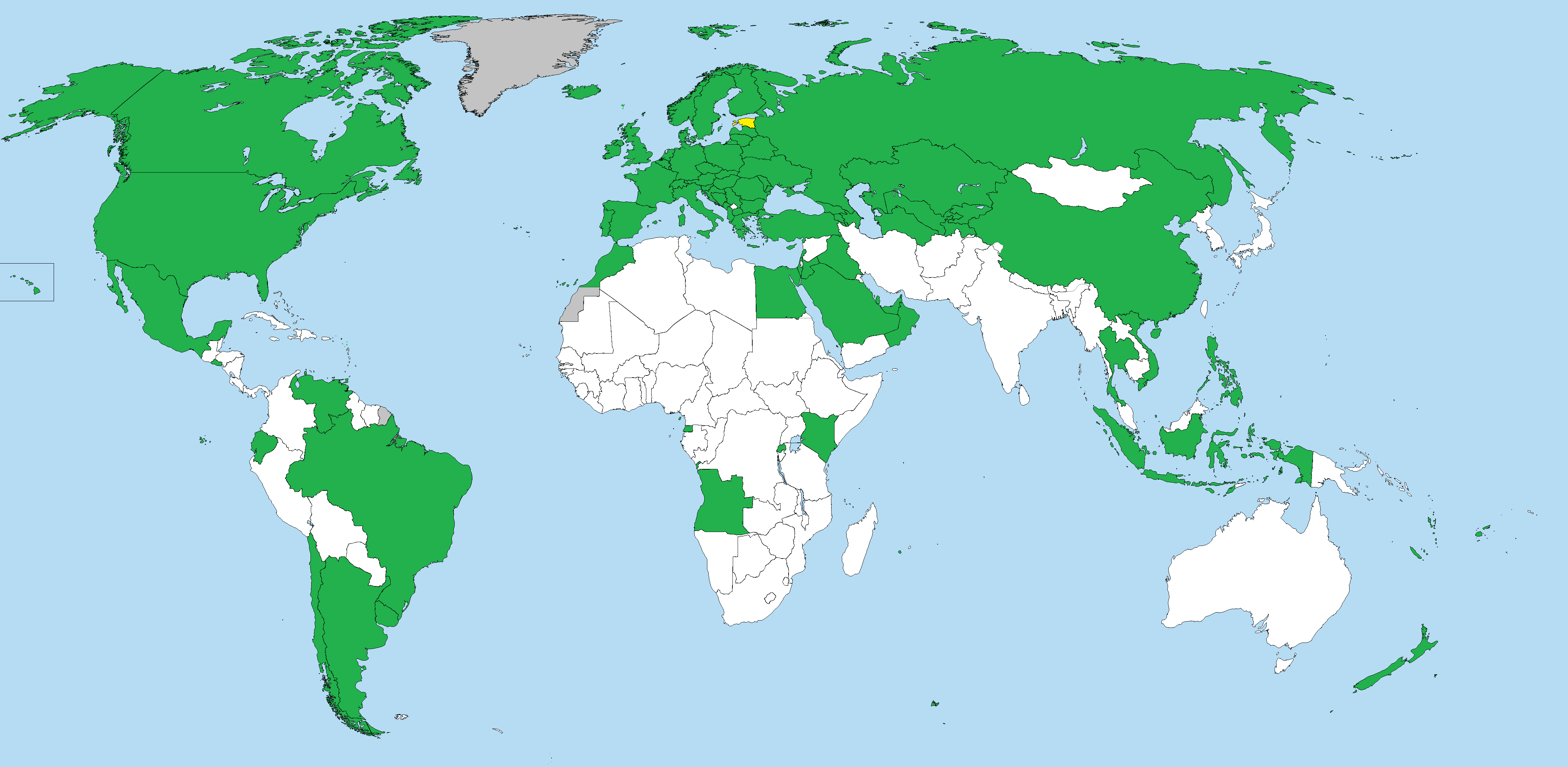
Estonia national football team opponents (marked green)

The following is a list of the Estonia national football team's competitive records and statistics.

== Competition records ==
=== FIFA World Cup ===
FIFA World Cup record									Qualification record					
Tournament	Round	Position	Pld	W	D	L	GF	GA	Pld	W	D	L	GF	GA
(Uruguay) 1930	Did not enter								Did not enter					
(Italy) 1934	Did not qualify								1	0	0	1	2	6
(France) 1938	Did not qualify								3	1	0	2	4	11
(Brazil) 1950	Did not enter								Did not enter					
(Switzerland) 1954	Did not enter								Did not enter					
(Sweden) 1958	Did not enter								Did not enter					
(Chile) 1962	Did not enter								Did not enter					
(England) 1966	Did not enter								Did not enter					
(Mexico) 1970	Did not enter								Did not enter					
(West Germany) 1974	Did not enter								Did not enter					
(Argentina) 1978	Did not enter								Did not enter					
(Spain) 1982	Did not enter								Did not enter					
(Mexico) 1986	Did not enter								Did not enter					
(Italy) 1990	Did not enter								Did not enter					
(United States) 1994	Did not qualify								10	0	1	9	1	27
(France) 1998	Did not qualify								10	1	1	8	4	16
(South Korea) (Japan) 2002	Did not qualify								10	2	2	6	10	26
(Germany) 2006	Did not qualify								12	5	2	5	16	17
(South Africa) 2010	Did not qualify								10	2	2	6	9	24
(Brazil) 2014	Did not qualify								10	2	1	7	6	20
(Russia) 2018	Did not qualify								10	3	2	5	13	19
(Qatar) 2022	Did not qualify								8	1	1	6	9	21
(Canada) (United States) (Mexico) 2026	To be determined								To be determined					
Total		0/22	0	0	0	0	0	0	84	17	12	55	74	187

Draws include knockout matches decided via penalty shoot-out.

=== UEFA European Championship ===
UEFA European Championship record									Qualification record					
Tournament	Round	Position	Pld	W	D	L	GF	GA	Pld	W	D	L	GF	GA
(France) 1960	Did not enter								Did not enter					
(Spain) 1964	Did not enter								Did not enter					
(Italy) 1968	Did not enter								Did not enter					
(Belgium) 1972	Did not enter								Did not enter					
(Socialist Federal Republic of Yugoslavia) 1976	Did not enter								Did not enter					
(Italy) 1980	Did not enter								Did not enter					
(France) 1984	Did not enter								Did not enter					
(West Germany) 1988	Did not enter								Did not enter					
(Sweden) 1992	Did not enter								Did not enter					
(England) 1996	Did not qualify								10	0	0	10	3	31
(Belgium) (Netherlands) 2000	Did not qualify								10	3	2	5	15	17
(Portugal) 2004	Did not qualify								8	2	2	4	4	6
(Austria) (Switzerland) 2008	Did not qualify								12	2	1	9	5	21
(Poland) (Ukraine) 2012	Did not qualify								12	5	2	5	16	19
(France) 2016	Did not qualify								10	3	1	6	4	9
(Europe) 2020	Did not qualify								8	0	1	7	2	26
(Germany) 2024	To be determined								To be determined					
Total		0/16	0	0	0	0	0	0	70	15	9	46	49	129

Draws include knockout matches decided via penalty shoot-out.

=== UEFA Nations League ===
UEFA Nations League record
Season	Division	Group	Round	Pos	Pld	W	D	L	GF	GA	P/R	RK
(Portugal) 2018–19	C	2	Group stage	4th	6	1	1	4	4	8	Same position	37th
(Italy) 2020–21	C	2	Group stage	4th	8	0	4	4	5	11	▼	47th
(Netherlands) 2022–23	D	2	Group stage	1st	4	4	0	0	10	2	▲	49th
Total			Group stage League C	3/3	18	5	5	8	19	21	37th	

=== Olympic Games ===
Estonia's only participation in a major tournament was at the 1924 Summer Olympics in Paris, France. Coached by Hungarian Ferenc Kónya, Estonia's participation was limited to a single match in the first round as the team lost 0–1 to the United States, with Andy Straden scoring the winning goal from the penalty spot in the 15th minute. Estonia were also given a penalty and a chance to equalise, but Elmar Kaljot's effort struck the crossbar in the 68th minute. After going out of the tournament, the Estonian team stayed on in Paris for three weeks, playing a friendly match against Ireland, which ended in a 1–3 defeat, and then went to Germany, playing friendly matches against various teams including a 2–2 draw against 1. FC Kaiserslautern.

=== Milestones ===
- First World Cup qualification game: 11 June 1933, Stockholm, Sweden (6–2 loss) (first FIFA World Cup qualification match in history);
- First World Cup victory and also first away win: 19 August 1937, Turku, Finland (1–0);
- First European Championship qualifying game: 4 September 1994, Tallinn, Croatia (2–0 loss);
- First World Cup victory since return to independence: 5 October 1996, Tallinn, Belarus (1–0);
- First European Championship victory: 4 June 1998, Tallinn, Faroe Islands (5–0);
- First away win in the European Championship: 31 March 1999, Vilnius, Lithuania (2–1).

== Head-to-head record ==
The following table shows the Estonia national football team's all-time international record.

Updated as of 16 November 2026.

Opponents	Confederation	Pld	W	D	L	GF	GA	GD	Win %
Albania	UEFA	4	0	3	1	1	3	−2	0%
Andorra	UEFA	13	12	1	0	28	5	+23	92.31%
Angola	CAF	1	1	0	0	1	0	+1	100%
Antigua and Barbuda	CONCACAF	1	1	0	0	1	0	+1	100%
Argentina	CONMEBOL	1	0	0	1	0	5	−5	0%
Armenia	UEFA	7	2	3	2	7	7	0	28.57%
Austria	UEFA	4	0	0	4	1	9	−8	0%
Azerbaijan	UEFA	12	4	6	2	12	9	+3	33.33%
Belarus	UEFA	10	5	1	4	12	11	+1	50%
Belgium	UEFA	10	1	0	9	8	32	−24	10%
Bosnia and Herzegovina	UEFA	7	1	1	5	4	21	−17	14.29%
Brazil	CONMEBOL	1	0	0	1	0	1	−1	0%
Bulgaria	UEFA	4	1	2	1	2	3	−1	25%
Canada	CONCACAF	2	2	0	0	4	1	+3	100%
Chile	CONMEBOL	1	0	0	1	0	4	−4	0%
China	AFC	2	0	0	2	0	4	−4	0%
Croatia	UEFA	9	1	2	6	5	16	−11	11.11%
Cyprus	UEFA	11	3	4	4	12	15	−3	27.27%
Czech Republic	UEFA	5	0	0	5	3	16	−13	0%
Denmark	UEFA	1	0	1	0	2	2	0	0%
Ecuador	CONMEBOL	2	0	0	2	1	3	−2	0%
Egypt	CAF	2	0	2	0	5	5	0	0%
El Salvador	CONCACAF	1	1	0	0	2	0	+2	100%
England	UEFA	4	0	0	4	0	9	−9	0%
Equatorial Guinea	CAF	1	1	0	0	3	0	+3	100%
Faroe Islands	UEFA	9	6	1	2	20	11	+9	66.67%
Fiji	OFC	1	1	0	0	2	0	+2	100%
Finland	UEFA	38	10	10	18	45	79	−34	26.32%
France	UEFA	1	0	0	1	0	4	−4	0%
Georgia	UEFA	8	2	2	4	7	9	−2	25%
Germany	UEFA	5	0	0	5	1	22	−21	0%
Gibraltar	UEFA	5	4	1	0	14	1	+13	80%
Greece	UEFA	6	1	2	3	5	9	−4	16.67%
Hong Kong	AFC	1	1	0	0	2	1	+1	100%
Hungary	UEFA	9	1	2	6	9	22	−13	11.11%
Iceland	UEFA	9	1	5	3	5	11	−6	11.11%
Indonesia	AFC	1	1	0	0	3	0	+3	100%
Iraq	AFC	1	0	1	0	1	1	0	0%
Israel	UEFA	5	0	0	5	2	17	−15	0%
Italy	UEFA	9	0	0	9	3	28	−25	0%
Jordan	AFC	1	1	0	0	1	0	+1	100%
Kazakhstan	UEFA	3	0	2	1	1	3	−2	0%
Kenya	CAF	1	0	1	0	1	1	0	0%
Kyrgyzstan	AFC	2	1	1	0	2	1	+1	50%
Latvia	UEFA	57	11	19	27	60	81	−21	19.3%
Lebanon	AFC	1	0	0	1	0	2	−2	0%
Liechtenstein	UEFA	5	4	1	0	10	2	+8	80%
Lithuania	UEFA	53	24	8	21	83	75	+8	45.28%
Luxembourg	UEFA	5	4	1	0	9	1	+8	80%
Malta	UEFA	8	4	2	2	12	10	+2	50%
Mexico	CONCACAF	1	0	0	1	0	6	−6	0%
Moldova	UEFA	7	4	2	1	7	4	+3	57.14%
Montenegro	UEFA	1	0	0	1	0	1	−1	0%
Morocco	CAF	1	0	0	1	1	3	−2	0%
Netherlands	UEFA	6	0	1	5	4	23	−19	0%
New Caledonia	OFC	1	0	1	0	1	1	0	0%
New Zealand	OFC	2	1	1	0	4	3	+1	50%
North Macedonia	UEFA	6	0	2	4	7	13	−6	0%
Northern Ireland	UEFA	7	2	0	5	7	9	−2	28.57%
Norway	UEFA	9	1	2	6	6	21	−15	11.11%
Oman	AFC	2	1	0	1	3	4	−1	50%
Philippines	AFC	1	1	0	0	1	0	+1	100%
Poland	UEFA	10	1	1	8	5	23	−18	10%
Portugal	UEFA	8	0	1	7	1	25	−24	0%
Qatar	AFC	2	0	0	2	0	5	−5	0%
Republic of Ireland	UEFA	5	0	1	4	2	12	−10	0%
Romania	UEFA	4	1	0	3	2	7	−5	25%
Russia	UEFA	6	1	1	4	5	14	−9	16.67%
Rwanda	CAF	1	0	0	1	0	2	−2	0%
Saint Kitts and Nevis	CONCACAF	2	1	1	0	4	1	+3	50%
San Marino	UEFA	5	4	1	0	9	0	+9	80%
Saudi Arabia	AFC	3	1	1	1	3	3	0	33.33%
Scotland	UEFA	8	0	2	6	3	13	−10	0%
Serbia	UEFA	3	1	1	1	4	3	+1	33.33%
Slovakia	UEFA	4	0	0	4	1	5	−4	0%
Slovenia	UEFA	9	2	1	6	5	13	−8	22.22%
Spain	UEFA	2	0	0	2	0	6	−6	0%
Sweden	UEFA	23	0	3	20	18	70	−52	0%
Switzerland	UEFA	5	0	0	5	0	18	−18	0%
Tajikistan	AFC	1	1	0	0	2	1	+1	100%
Thailand	AFC	3	0	1	2	2	3	−1	0%
Trinidad and Tobago	CONCACAF	1	1	0	0	1	0	+1	100%
Turkey	UEFA	8	0	3	5	4	17	−13	0%
Turkmenistan	AFC	1	0	1	0	1	1	0	0%
Ukraine	UEFA	5	0	0	5	0	11	−11	0%
United Arab Emirates	AFC	2	0	1	1	3	4	−1	0%
United States	CONCACAF	2	0	0	2	0	5	−5	0%
Uruguay	CONMEBOL	2	1	0	1	2	3	−1	50%
Uzbekistan	AFC	2	0	2	0	3	3	0	0%
Vanuatu	OFC	1	1	0	0	1	0	+1	0%
Venezuela	CONMEBOL	1	0	0	1	0	3	−3	0%
Vietnam	AFC	1	0	0	1	0	1	−1	0%
Wales	UEFA	4	0	1	3	1	4	−3	0%
Total		538	139	117	282	535	936	–401	25.84%

== See also ==
- Estonia national football team
- Estonia national football team results (1920–1940)
- Estonia national football team results (1991–2009)
- Estonia national football team results (2010–2019)
- Estonia national football team results (2020–present)
