= Estonia national football team results (2010–2019) =

This is a list of the Estonia national football team results from 2010 to 2019.

== 2010 ==
3 March Friendly	Georgia	2–1	Estonia	Lokomotivi Stadium, Tbilisi
17:00 UTC+3	Kobiashvili 45+4'; Siradze 90+4'	Report	Purje 83'	Attendance: 40,000; Referee: Veaceslav Banari (Moldova)

21 May Friendly	Estonia	2–0	Finland	A. Le Coq Arena, Tallinn
19:00 UTC+3	Oper 5'; Post 55'	Report		Attendance: 5,650; Referee: István Vad (Hungary)
Note: It was the farewell match for Indrek Zelinski, who acquired total of 103 caps and 27 goals. Sander Post scored his first international goal, which helped Estonia overcome Finland for the first time in 73 years. Karl Palatu was capped for the first time.

26 May 2010 Friendly	Estonia	0–0	Croatia	A. Le Coq Arena, Tallinn
21:30 UTC+3		Report		Attendance: 4,800; Referee: Michael Svendsen (Denmark)

19 June 2010 Baltic Cup	Latvia	0–0	Estonia	S. Darius and S. Girėnas Stadium, Kaunas
18:10 UTC+3		Report		Attendance: 300; Referee: Gediminas Mažeika (Lithuania)
Note: Sergei Mošnikov was capped for the first time.

20 June 2010 Baltic Cup	Lithuania	2–0	Estonia	S. Darius and S. Girėnas Stadium, Kaunas
18:10 UTC+3	Savėnas 31' (pen.); Rimkevičius 90+2'	Report		Attendance: 600; Referee: Andrejs Sipailo (Latvia)

11 August Euro 2012 qualifying	Estonia	2–1	Faroe Islands	A. Le Coq Arena, Tallinn
20:00 UTC+3	Saag 90+1'; Piiroja 90+3'	Report	Edmundsson 28'	Attendance: 5,201; Referee: Ante Vučemilović-Šimunović Jr. (Croatia)

3 September Euro 2012 qualifying	Estonia	1–2	Italy	A. Le Coq Arena, Tallinn
21:30 UTC+3	Zenjov 31'	Report	Cassano 60'; Bonucci 63'	Attendance: 9,000; Referee: Carlos Velasco Carballo (Spain)

7 September Friendly	Estonia	3–3	Uzbekistan	A. Le Coq Arena, Tallinn
19:00 UTC+3	Purje 25'; Vassiljev 63'; Vassiljev 72' (pen.)	Report	Shatskikh 9'; Geynrikh 55'; Shatskikh 85'	Attendance: 2,055; Referee: Huw Jones (Wales)

8 October Euro 2012 qualifying	Serbia	1–3	Estonia	Stadion FK Partizan, Belgrade
20:30 UTC+2	Žigić 60'	Report	Kink 63'; Vassiljev 73'; Luković 90+1' (o.g.)	Attendance: 10,000; Referee: Maksim Layushkin (Russia)

12 October Euro 2012 qualifying	Estonia	0–1	Slovenia	A. Le Coq Arena, Tallinn
21:30 UTC+3		Report	Sidorenkov 66' (o.g.)	Attendance: 5,722; Referee: Tommy Skjerven (Norway)

17 November Friendly	Estonia	1–1	Liechtenstein	A. Le Coq Arena, Tallinn
18:45 UTC+3	Vassiljev 57' (pen.)	Report	Frick 36'	Attendance: 1,909; Referee: Aleksandr Gvardis (Russia)
Note: Siim Luts was capped for the first time.

18 December Friendly	China	3–0	Estonia	Zhuhai Sports Center Stadium, Zhuhai
17:00 UTC+8	Du Wei 17'; Yu Hai 20'; Yang Xu 38'			Referee: Ko Hyung Jin (South Korea)
Note: Rauno Alliku, Markus Jürgenson and Marko Meerits were capped for the first time.

22 December Friendly	Qatar	2–0	Estonia	Khalifa International Stadium, Doha
16:00 UTC+3	Soria 37'; Fábio César 78'			Referee: Carlo Bertolini (Switzerland)

== 2011 ==
9 February Friendly; Unofficial (Note: Originally, the match against Bulgaria was recognised as a full international match by FIFA, but was later dismissed as the organizers were found guilty of match fixing. Referees Krisztián Selmeczi, János Csák and Kolos Lengyel were banned for life.)	Bulgaria	2–2	Estonia	Mardan Sports Complex, Antalya, Turkey
21:00 UTC+2	Popov 40' (pen.), 83' (pen.)	Report	20' (pen.), 80' (pen.) Vassiljev	Attendance: 200; Referee: Krisztián Selmeczi (Hungary)

25 March Friendly	Estonia	2–0	Uruguay	A. Le Coq Arena, Tallinn
19:00 UTC+2	Vassiljev 61'; Zahovaiko 65'	Report		Attendance: 6,817; Referee: Antti Munukka (Finland)

29 March Euro 2012 qualifying	Estonia	1–1	Serbia	A. Le Coq Arena, Tallinn
21:30 UTC+3	Vassiljev 84'	Report	38' Pantelić	Attendance: 5,185; Referee: Bas Nijhuis (Netherlands)

25 May Friendly; Unofficial	Estonia	1–2	Basque Country	A. Le Coq Arena, Tallinn
UTC+3	Kink 58'	Report	51', 63' Aduriz	Attendance: 3,224; Referee: Anders Hermansen (Denmark)

3 June Euro 2012 qualifying	Italy	3–0	Estonia	Stadio Alberto Braglia, Modena
21:50 UTC+3	Rossi 21'; Cassano 39'; Pazzini 68'	Report		Attendance: 19,434; Referee: Alexandru Dan Tudor (Romania)

7 June Euro 2012 qualifying	Faroe Islands	2–0	Estonia	Svangaskarð, Toftir
21:30 UTC+3	Benjaminsen 43' (pen.); Hansen 47'	Report		Attendance: 1,715; Referee: Antti Munukka (Finland)

20 June Friendly	Chile	4–0	Estonia	Estadio Monumental, Santiago
02:00 UTC+3	Fernández 21'; Ponce 41'; Suazo 45+1' (pen.); Sánchez 50'	Report		Attendance: 20,000; Referee: Martin Vazquez (Uruguay)

24 June Friendly	Uruguay	3–0	Estonia	Estadio Atilio Paiva Olivera, Rivera
01:30 UTC+3	Cáceres 12'; Reintam 54' (o.g.); Lodeiro 71'	Report		Attendance: 25,000; Referee: Saul Lavarni (Argentina)

10 August Friendly	Turkey	3–0	Estonia	Türk Telekom Arena, Istanbul
21:30 UTC+3	Belözoğlu 8' (pen.); Kazim-Richards 28', 35'	Report		Referee: Lee Probert (England)

2 September Euro 2012 qualifying	Slovenia	1–2	Estonia	Stožice Stadium, Ljubljana
21:45 UTC+3	Matavž 78'	Report	29' (pen.) Vassiljev; 81' Purje	Attendance: 15,480; Referee: Stephan Studer (Switzerland)

6 September Euro 2012 qualifying	Estonia	4–1	Northern Ireland	A. Le Coq Arena, Tallinn
21:30 UTC+3	vunk 28'; Kink 32'; Zenjov 59'; Saag 90+3'	Report	40' (o.g.) Piiroja	Attendance: 8,660; Referee: Daniel Stalhammar (Sweden)

7 October Euro 2012 qualifying	Northern Ireland	1–2	Estonia	Windsor Park, Belfast
21:45 UTC+3	Davis 22'	Report	77' (pen.), 84' Vassiljev	Attendance: 12,604; Referee: Manuel Gräfe (Germany)

11 October Friendly	Estonia	0–2	Ukraine	A. Le Coq Arena, Tallinn
20:00 UTC+3		Report	45+1' Husyev; 68' Aliyev	Attendance: 4,501; Referee: Robert Malek (Poland)

11 November Euro 2012 qual. play-offs	Estonia	0–4	Republic of Ireland	A. Le Coq Arena, Tallinn
21:45 UTC+2		Report	13' Andrews; 67' Walters; 71', 88' (pen.) Keane	Attendance: 9,692; Referee: Viktor Kassai (Hungary)

15 November Euro 2012 qual. play-offs	Republic of Ireland	1–1	Estonia	Aviva Stadium, Dublin
21:45 UTC+2	Ward 32'	Report	57' Vassiljev	Attendance: 51,151; Referee: Björn Kuipers (Netherlands)

== 2012 ==
1 March Friendly	El Salvador	0–2	Estonia	Los Angeles, United States
20:30 UTC-8		Report	Klavan 71'; Kams 85'	Stadium: Los Angeles Memorial Coliseum; Attendance: 15,000; Referee: Ricardo Salazar (United States)

25 May Friendly	Croatia	3–1	Estonia	Pula, Croatia
20:30 (UTC+2)	Ćorluka 16'; Nikola Kalinić 20'; Vukojević 81'	Report	Vassiljev 83'	Stadium: Stadion Aldo Drosina; Attendance: 9,000; Referee: Mihaly Fabian (Hungary)

28 May Friendly	Ukraine	4–0	Estonia	Kufstein, Austria
20:00 (UTC+2)	Yarmolenko 9'; Husyev 34' (pen.); Voronin 41'; Milevskyi 50'	Report		Stadium: Kufstein Arena; Attendance: 500; Referee: Harald Lechner (Austria)

1 June 2012 Baltic Cup	Estonia	1–2	Finland	Tartu, Estonia
20:30 (UTC+3)	Oper 33'	Report	Kuqi 10', 22'	Stadium: Tamme Stadium; Attendance: 2,470; Referee: Vadims Direktorenko (Latvia)

3 June 2012 Baltic Cup	Estonia	1–0	Lithuania	Tartu, Estonia
16:30 (UTC+3)	Voskoboinikov 18'	Report		Stadium: Tamme staadion Attendance: 1,094; Referee: Hannes Kaasik (Estonia)

5 June Friendly	France	4–0	Estonia	Le Mans, France
22:00 (UTC+2)	Ribéry 24'; Benzema 37', 47'; Ménez 90'	Report		Stadium: MMArena; Referee: Liran Liany (Israel)

15 August Friendly	Estonia	1–0	Poland	Tallinn, Estonia
21:45 (UTC+3)	Vassiljev 90'	Report		Stadium: A. Le Coq Arena; Attendance: 5,312; Referee: Ken Henry Johnsen (Norway)

7 September 2014 FIFA World Cup qualification	Estonia	0–2	Romania	Tallinn, Estonia
21:00 (UTC+3)		Report	Torje 55'; Marica 75'	Stadium: A. Le Coq Arena; Attendance: 7,936; Referee: Milorad Mazic (Serbia)

11 September 2014 FIFA World Cup qualification	Turkey	3–0	Estonia	Istanbul, Turkey
21:00 (UTC+3)	Belözoglu 44'; Bulut 60'; Inan 75'	Report		Stadium: Şükrü Saracoğlu Stadium; Attendance: 44,168; Referee: Marcin Borski (Poland)

12 October 2014 FIFA World Cup qualification	Estonia	0–1	Hungary	Tallinn, Estonia
21:30 (UTC+3)		Report	Hajnal 46'	Stadium: A. Le Coq Arena; Attendance: 5,661; Referee: Liran Liani (Israel)

16 October 2014 FIFA World Cup qualification	Andorra	0–1	Estonia	Andorra la Vella, Andorra
21:00 (UTC+2)		Report	Oper 57'	Stadium: Estadi Comunal d'Andorra la Vella; Referee: Dimitar Meckarovski (Macedonia)

8 November Friendly	Oman	1–2	Estonia	Muscat, Oman
17:30 (UTC+4)	Al-Muqbali 17'	Report	Anier 85'; Kams 88'	Stadium: Sultan Qaboos Sports Complex; Referee: Ali Hammed (United Arab Emirates)

14 November Friendly	United Arab Emirates	2–1	Estonia	Abu Dhabi, United Arab Emirates
19:30 (UTC+4)	Al Kamali 30' (pen.); Mabkhout 70'	Report	Ahjupera 45'	Stadium: Mohammed Bin Zayed Stadium; Referee: Sami Mazyad Al Nemari (Saudi Arabia)

== 2013 ==
6 February Friendly	Scotland	1–0	Estonia	Aberdeen, Scotland
19:45 (UTC±0)	Mulgrew 39'	Report		Stadium: Pittodrie Stadium; Attendance: 16,202; Referee: Clément Turpin (France)

22 March 2014 FIFA World Cup qualification	Netherlands	3–0	Estonia	Amsterdam, Netherlands
20:30 (UTC+1)	Van der Vaart 47'; Van Persie 72'; Schaken 84'	Report		Stadium: Amsterdam Arena; Attendance: 48,675; Referee: Vitali Meshkov (Russia)

26 March 2014 FIFA World Cup qualification	Estonia	2–0	Andorra	Tallinn, Estonia
19:00 (UTC+2)	Anier 45+1'; Lindpere 61'	Report		Stadium: A. Le Coq Arena; Attendance: 5,237; Referee: Ján Valášek (Slovakia)

3 June Friendly	Estonia	0–2	Belarus	Tallinn, Estonia
20:00 (UTC+3)		Report	Putsila 32'; Rodionov 80'	Stadium: A. Le Coq Arena; Attendance: 3,192; Referee: Jakob Kehlet (Denmark)

7 June Friendly	Estonia	1–0	Trinidad and Tobago	Tallinn, Estonia
20:00 (UTC+3)	Anier 13'	Report		Stadium: A. Le Coq Arena; Attendance: 3,016; Referee: Mark Whitby (Wales)

11 June Friendly	Estonia	1–1	Kyrgyzstan	Tallinn, Estonia
20:00 (UTC+3)	Puri 45+2'	Report	Kharchenko 67'	Stadium: A. Le Coq Arena; Attendance: 3,134; Referee: Sergey Tsinkevich (Belarus)

14 August Friendly	Estonia	1–1	Latvia	Tallinn, Estonia
19:00 (UTC+3)	Kruglov 68'	Report	Zjuzins 74'	Stadium: A. Le Coq Arena; Attendance: 5,686; Referee: Michael Lerjéus (Sweden)

6 September 2014 FIFA World Cup qualification	Estonia	2–2	Netherlands	Tallinn, Estonia
21:30 (UTC+3)	Vassiljev 18', 57'	Report	Robben 2'; Van Persie 90+4' (pen.)	Stadium: A. Le Coq Arena; Attendance: 10,210; Referee: Serhiy Boyko (Ukraine)

10 September 2014 FIFA World Cup qualification	Hungary	5–1	Estonia	Budapest, Hungary
20:30 (UTC+3)	Klavan 11' (o.g.); Hajnal 21'; Böde 41'; Németh 69'; Dzsudzsák 85'	Report	Kink 48'	Stadium: Ferenc Puskás Stadion; Attendance: 7,741; Referee: Aleksei Kulbakov (Belarus)

11 October 2014 FIFA World Cup qualification	Estonia	0–2	Turkey	Tallinn, Estonia
21:30 (UTC+3)		Report	Bulut 22'; Yılmaz 47'	Stadium: A. Le Coq Arena; Attendance: 8,572; Referee: Nicola Rizzoli (Italy)

15 October 2014 FIFA World Cup qualification	Romania	2–0	Estonia	Bucharest, Romania
21:00 (UTC+3)	Marica 30' (pen.), 81'	Report		Stadium: Arena Națională; Attendance: 18,852; Referee: Marijo Strahonja (Croatia)

15 November Friendly	Estonia	2–1	Azerbaijan	Tallinn, Estonia
18:45 (UTC+3)	Zenjov 54'; Lindpere 66'	Report	Aliyev 44'	Stadium: A. Le Coq Arena; Attendance: 2,413; Referee: Aleksei Nikolaev (Russia)

19 November Friendly	Liechtenstein	0–3	Estonia	Vaduz, Liechtenstein
19:00 (UTC+1)		Report	Zenjov 45'; Anier 61', 63'	Stadium: Rheinpark Stadion; Attendance: 684; Referee: Chris Reisch (Luxembourg)

== 2014 ==
5 March Non-FIFA Friendly	Gibraltar	0–2	Estonia	Gibraltar
20:00 (UTC+1)		Report	Kruglov 11'; Hunt 81'	Stadium: Victoria Stadium; Attendance: 1,906; Referee: Arnold Hunter (Northern Ireland)

26 May Non-FIFA Friendly	Estonia	1–1	Gibraltar	Tallinn, Estonia
20:00 (UTC+3)	Klavan 31'	Report	Gosling 71'	Stadium: A. Le Coq Arena; Attendance: 4,805; Referee: Clayton Pisani (Malta)

29 May 2014 Baltic Cup	Latvia	0–0 (4–2 p)	Estonia	Liepāja, Latvia
20:15 (UTC+3)		Report		Stadium: Daugava Stadium; Attendance: 2,115; Referee: Sergejus Slyva (Lithuania)
	Penalties
	Zjuzins (penalty scored); Laizāns (penalty scored); Fertovs (penalty scored); Višņakovs (penalty scored)		(penalty scored) Vassiljev; (penalty missed) Vunk; (penalty scored) Kallaste; (penalty missed) Mets

31 May 2014 Baltic Cup	Finland	2–0	Estonia	Ventspils, Latvia
15:00 (UTC+3)	Hetemaj 49'; Moren 87'	Report		Stadium: Ventspils Olimpiskais Stadions; Attendance: 830; Referee: Aleksandrs Anufrijevs (Latvia)

4 June Friendly	Iceland	1–0	Estonia	Reykjavík, Iceland
19:15 UTC±0	Sigþórsson 54' (pen.)	Report		Stadium: Laugardalsvöllur; Attendance: 5,079; Referee: Jakob Kehlet (Denmark)

7 June Friendly	Estonia	2–1	Tajikistan	Tallinn, Estonia
20:00 (UTC+3)	Luts 89'; Hannes Anier 90+2'	Report	Vasiev 61'	Stadium: A. Le Coq Arena; Attendance: 2,615; Referee: Gediminas Mažeika (Lithuania)

4 September Friendly	Sweden	2–0	Estonia	Stockholm, Sweden
19:45 (UTC+3)	Ibrahimović 3', 24'	Report		Stadium: Friends Arena, Stockholm; Attendance: 15,421; Referee: Kristinn Jakobsson (Iceland)

8 September UEFA Euro 2016 qualifying	Estonia	1–0	Slovenia	Tallinn, Estonia
21:45 (UTC+3)	Purje 86'	Report		Stadium: A. Le Coq Arena; Attendance: 6,561; Referee: Szymon Marciniak (Poland)

9 October UEFA Euro 2016 qualifying	Lithuania	1–0	Estonia	Vilnius, Lithuania
21:45 (UTC+3)	Mikoliūnas 76'	Report		Stadium: LFF Stadium; Attendance: 4,780; Referee: Carlos Clos (Spain)

12 October UEFA Euro 2016 qualifying	Estonia	0–1	England	Tallinn, Estonia
19:00 (UTC+3)		Report	Rooney 74'	Stadium: A. Le Coq Arena; Attendance: 10,195; Referee: Marijo Strahonja (Croatia)

12 November Friendly	Norway	0–1	Estonia	Oslo, Norway
20:00 (UTC+1)		Report	Vassiljev 24'	Stadium: Ullevaal; Attendance: 9,580; Referee: Martin Hansson (Sweden)

15 November UEFA Euro 2016 qualifying	San Marino	0–0	Estonia	Serravalle, San Marino
18:00 (UTC+1)		Report		Stadium: Stadio Olimpico; Attendance: 759; Referee: Felix Brych (Germany)

18 November Friendly	Estonia	1–0	Jordan	Tallinn, Estonia
20:10 (UTC+3)	Henri Anier 16'	Report		Stadium: A. Le Coq Arena; Attendance: 1,360; Referee: Jonathan Lardot (Belgium)

27 December Friendly	Qatar	3–0	Estonia	Doha, Qatar
17:30 (UTC+3)	Muntari 23'; Hassan 30'; Mohammad 36'	Report		Stadium: Abdullah bin Khalifa Stadium; Referee: Ali Shaban (Kuwait)

== 2015 ==
27 March UEFA Euro 2016 qualifying	Switzerland	3–0	Estonia	Lucerne, Switzerland
20:45 (UTC+1)	Schär 17'; Xhaka 27'; Seferovic 80'	Report		Stadium: Swissporarena; Attendance: 14,500; Referee: Danny Makkelie (Netherlands)

31 March Friendly	Estonia	1–1	Iceland	Tallinn, Estonia
19:00 (UTC+3)	Vassiljev 55'	Report	Gíslason 9'	Stadium: A. Le Coq Arena; Attendance: 5,334; Referee: Andris Treimanis (Latvia)

9 June Friendly	Finland	0–2	Estonia	Turku, Finland
19:00 (UTC+3)		Report	Purje 28', 57'	Stadium: Veritas Stadion; Attendance: 6,107; Referee: Jakob Kehlet (Denmark)

14 June UEFA Euro 2016 qualifying	Estonia	2–0	San Marino	Tallinn, Estonia
19:00 (UTC+3)	Zenjov 35', 63'	Report		Stadium: A. Le Coq Arena; Attendance: 6,131; Referee: Ivan Kružliak (Slovakia)

5 September UEFA Euro 2016 qualifying	Estonia	1–0	Lithuania	Tallinn, Estonia
19:00 (UTC+3)	Vassiljev 71'	Report		Stadium: A. Le Coq Arena; Attendance: 6,621; Referee: Oliver Drachta (Austria)

8 September UEFA Euro 2016 qualifying	Slovenia	1–0	Estonia	Maribor, Slovenia
20:45 (UTC+3)	Berić 63'	Report		Stadium: Stadion Ljudski vrt Attendance: 6,868; Referee: Anastasios Sidiropoulos (Greece)

9 October UEFA Euro 2016 qualifying	England	2–0	Estonia	London, England
19:45 (UTC+1)	Walcott 45'; Sterling 85'	Report		Stadium: Wembley Stadium; Attendance: 75,427; Referee: István Vad (Hungary)

12 October UEFA Euro 2016 qualifying	Estonia	0–1	Switzerland	Tallinn, Estonia
21:45 (UTC+3)		Report	Klavan 90+4' (o.g.)	Stadium: A. Le Coq Arena; Attendance: 7,304; Referee: Pol van Boekel (Netherlands)

11 November Friendly	Estonia	3–0	Georgia	Tallinn, Estonia
19:00 (UTC+3)	Purje 60'; Pikk 65'; Gussev 88'	Report		Stadium: A. Le Coq Arena; Attendance: 2,266; Referee: Raymond Crangle (Northern Ireland)

17 November Friendly	Estonia	3–0	Saint Kitts and Nevis	Tallinn, Estonia
19:00 (UTC+3)	Antonov 29'; Vassiljev 50'; Puri 57'	Report		Stadium: A. Le Coq Arena; Attendance: 1,902; Referee: Petur Reinert (Faroe Islands)

== 2016 ==
6 January Friendly	Sweden	1–1	Estonia	Abu Dhabi, United Arab Emirates
17:45 UTC+4	Ishak 70'	Report	Prosa 56'	Stadium: Armed Forces Stadium; Referee: Ahmad Salem Khalfan (United Arab Emirates)

24 March Friendly	Estonia	0–0	Norway	Tallinn, Estonia
19:00 (UTC+3)		Report		Stadium: A. Le Coq Arena; Attendance: 2,892; Referee: Andrew Dallas (Scotland)

29 March Friendly	Estonia	0–1	Serbia	Tallinn, Estonia
19:00 (UTC+3)		Report	Kolarov 81'	Stadium: A. Le Coq Arena; Attendance: 2,858; Referee: Arnold Hunter (Northern Ireland)

29 May 2016 Baltic Cup	Lithuania	2–0	Estonia	Klaipėda, Lithuania
16:00 (UTC+3)	Valskis 30'; Černych 45'	Report		Stadium: Klaipėda Central Stadium; Attendance: 3,700; Referee: Aleksandrs Anufrijevs (Latvia)

1 June Friendly	Estonia	2–0	Andorra	Tallinn, Estonia
19:00 (UTC+3)	Kruglov 24'; Liivak 90+4'	Report		Stadium: A. Le Coq Arena; Attendance: 4,658; Referee: Sergejus Slyva (Lithuania)

4 June 2016 Baltic Cup	Estonia	0–0	Latvia	Tallinn, Estonia
19:00 (UTC+3)		Report		Stadium: A. Le Coq Arena; Attendance: 1,982; Referee: Gediminas Mažeika (Lithuania)

8 June Friendly	Portugal	7–0	Estonia	Lisbon, Portugal
19:45 (UTC+1)	Ronaldo 36', 45'; Quaresma 39', 77'; Danilo 55'; Mets 61' (o.g.); Éder 80'	Report		Stadium: Estádio da Luz; Attendance: 52,536; Referee: Bart Vertenten (Belgium)

31 August Friendly	Estonia	1–1	Malta	Pärnu, Estonia
18:30 (UTC+3)	Zenjov 57'	Report	Effiong 59'	Stadium: Pärnu Rannastaadion; Attendance: 2,515; Referee: Michael Tykgaard (Denmark)

6 September 2018 FIFA World Cup qualification	Bosnia and Herzegovina	5–0	Estonia	Zenica, Bosnia and Herzegovina
20:45 (UTC+2)	Spahić 7', 90+2'; Džeko 23' (pen.); Medunjanin 71'; Ibišević 83'	Report		Stadium: Bilino Polje Stadium; Attendance: 13,632; Referee: Miroslav Zelinka (Czech Republic)

7 October 2018 FIFA World Cup qualification	Estonia	4–0	Gibraltar	Tallinn, Estonia
21:45 (UTC+3)	Käit 47', 70'; Vassiljev 52'; Mošnikov 88'	Report		Stadium: A. Le Coq Arena; Attendance: 4,678; Referee: Aleksei Eskov (Russia)

10 October 2018 FIFA World Cup qualification	Estonia	0–2	Greece	Tallinn, Estonia
21:45 (UTC+3)		Report	Torosidis 2'; Stafylidis 61'	Stadium: A. Le Coq Arena; Attendance: 4,467; Referee: István Vad (Hungary)

13 November 2018 FIFA World Cup qualification	Belgium	8–1	Estonia	Brussels, Belgium
20:45 (UTC+1)	Meunier 8'; Mertens 16', 68'; Hazard 25'; Carrasco 62'; Klavan 64' (o.g.); Lukaku 83', 88'	Report	Anier 29'	Stadium: King Baudouin Stadium; Attendance: 37,128; Referee: Alexandru Tudor (Romania)

19 November Friendly	Saint Kitts and Nevis	1–1	Estonia	Basseterre, Saint Kitts and Nevis
20:00 (UTC−4)	Elliott 9'	Report	Sappinen 41'	Stadium: Warner Park; Attendance: 1,124; Referee: Leo Clarke (Saint Lucia)

22 November Friendly	Antigua and Barbuda	0–1	Estonia	St. John's, Antigua and Barbuda
19:00 (UTC−4)		Report	Marin 25'	Stadium: Antigua Recreation Ground; Attendance: 2,683; Referee: Tristley Bassue (Saint Kitts and Nevis)

== 2017 ==
25 March 2018 FIFA World Cup qualification	Cyprus	0–0	Estonia	Nicosia, Cyprus
19:00 (UTC+2)		Report		Stadium: GSP Stadium; Attendance: 3,864; Referee: Ville Nevalainen (Finland)

28 March Friendly	Estonia	3–0	Croatia	Tallinn, Estonia
19:00 (UTC+3)	Luts 1'; Vassiljev 81'; Zenjov 84'	Report		Stadium: A. Le Coq Arena; Attendance: 4,987; Referee: Mark Clattenburg (England)

9 June 2018 FIFA World Cup qualification	Estonia	0–2	Belgium	Tallinn, Estonia
21:45 (UTC+3)		Report	Mertens 31'; Chadli 86'	Stadium: A. Le Coq Arena; Attendance: 10,176; Referee: John Beaton (Scotland)

12 June Friendly	Latvia	1–2	Estonia	Riga, Latvia
19:45 (UTC+3)	Ikaunieks 22'	Report	Zenjov 51'; Purje 77'	Stadium: Skonto Stadium; Attendance: 3,157; Referee: Kirill Levnikov (Russia)

31 August 2018 FIFA World Cup qualification	Greece	0–0	Estonia	Piraeus, Greece
21:45 (UTC+3)		Report		Stadium: Karaiskakis Stadium; Attendance: 12,379; Referee: Liran Liany (Israel)

3 September 2018 FIFA World Cup qualification	Estonia	1–0	Cyprus	Tallinn, Estonia
19:00 (UTC+3)	Käit 90+2'	Report		Stadium: A. Le Coq Arena; Attendance: 5,491; Referee: Adrien Jaccottet (Switzerland)

7 October 2018 FIFA World Cup qualification	Gibraltar	0–6	Estonia	Faro/Loulé, Portugal
17:00 (UTC+1)		Report	Luts 10'; Käit 30'; Zenjov 38'; Tamm 52', 65', 77'	Stadium: Estádio Algarve; Attendance: 712; Referee: Fran Jović (Croatia)

10 October 2018 FIFA World Cup qualification	Estonia	1–2	Bosnia and Herzegovina	Tallinn, Estonia
21:45 (UTC+3)	Antonov 75'	Report	Hajrović 48', 84'	Stadium: A. Le Coq Arena; Attendance: 4,967; Referee: Vladislav Bezborodov (Russia)

9 November Friendly	Finland	3–0	Estonia	Helsinki, Finland
19:00 (UTC+2)	Soiri 27'; Lod 32', 54'	Report		Stadium: Telia 5G -areena Attendance: 2,190; Referee: Ola Hobber Nilsen (Norway)

12 November Friendly	Malta	0–3	Estonia	Ta' Qali, Malta
15:00 (UTC+1)		Report	Sappinen 1'; Mošnikov 14' (pen.); Anier 89'	Stadium: National Stadium; Attendance: 2,796; Referee: Genc Nuza (Kosovo)

19 November Friendly	Fiji	0–2	Estonia	Suva, Fiji
15:00 (UTC+13)		Report	Anier 14'; Miller 90+2'	Stadium: ANZ Stadium; Attendance: 4,500; Referee: Nick Waldron (New Zealand)

23 November Friendly	Vanuatu	0–1	Estonia	Port Vila, Vanuatu
14:00 (UTC+11)		Report	Liivak 30'	Stadium: Port Vila Municipal Stadium; Attendance: 3,000; Referee: Médéric Lacour (New Caledonia)

26 November Friendly	New Caledonia	1–1	Estonia	Nouméa, New Caledonia
17:00 (UTC+11)	Ounei 64'	Report	Anier 54'	Stadium: Stade Numa-Daly Magenta; Attendance: 2,109; Referee: Abdelkader Zitouni (Tahiti)

== 2018 ==
7 January Non-FIFA Friendly	Sweden	1–1	Estonia	Abu Dhabi, United Arab Emirates
21:15 (UTC+4)	Holmberg 79'	Report	Anier 58'	Stadium: Zayed Sports City Stadium; Attendance: 200; Referee: Antti Munukka (Finland)

24 March Friendly	Armenia	0–0	Estonia	Yerevan, Armenia
14:00 (UTC+4)		Report		Stadium: Republican Stadium; Attendance: 3,500; Referee: Giorgi Vadachkoria (Georgia)

27 March Friendly	Georgia	2–0	Estonia	Tbilisi, Georgia
19:00 (UTC+4)	Tabidze 6'; Qazaishvili 35'	Report		Stadium: Mikheil Meskhi Stadium; Attendance: 21,954; Referee: Aleksei Kulbakov (Belarus)

30 May 2018 Baltic Cup	Estonia	2–0	Lithuania	Rakvere, Estonia
19:00 (UTC+3)	Ojamaa 23'; Käit 42'	Report		Stadium: Rakvere linnastaadion Attendance: 1,460; Referee: Andris Treimanis (Latvia)

2 June 2018 Baltic Cup	Latvia	1–0	Estonia	Riga, Latvia
18:00 (UTC+3)	Ikaunieks 70'	Report		Stadium: Daugava Stadium; Attendance: 4,251; Referee: Manfredas Lukjančukas (Lithuania)

9 June Friendly	Estonia	1–3	Morocco	Tallinn, Estonia
19:00 (UTC+3)	Purje 75'	Report	Belhanda 11'; Ziyech 38' (pen.); En-Nesyri 72'	Stadium: A. Le Coq Arena; Attendance: 4,754; Referee: Marius Avram (Romania)

8 September 2018–19 UEFA Nations League	Estonia	0–1	Greece	Tallinn, Estonia
21:45 (UTC+3)		Report	Fortounis 14'	Stadium: A. Le Coq Arena; Attendance: 5,567; Referee: Serdar Gözübüyük (Netherlands)

11 September 2018–19 UEFA Nations League	Finland	1–0	Estonia	Turku, Finland
21:45 (UTC+3)	Pukki 12'	Report		Stadium: Veritas Stadion; Attendance: 4,632; Referee: Orel Grinfeld (Israel)

12 October 2018–19 UEFA Nations League	Estonia	0–1	Finland	Tallinn, Estonia
21:45 (UTC+3)		Report	Pukki 90+1'	Stadium: A. Le Coq Arena; Attendance: 8,087; Referee: Craig Pawson (England)

15 October 2018–19 UEFA Nations League	Estonia	3–3	Hungary	Tallinn, Estonia
21:45 (UTC+3)	Luts 20'; Pátkai 70' (o.g.); Anier 79'	Report	Nagy 24'; Szalai 54', 81'	Stadium: A. Le Coq Arena; Attendance: 3,043; Referee: Halis Özkahya (Turkey)

15 November 2018–19 UEFA Nations League	Hungary	2–0	Estonia	Budapest, Hungary
20:45 (UTC+1)	Orban 8'; Szalai 69'	Report		Stadium: Groupama Aréna; Attendance: 7,700; Referee: Enea Jorgji (Albania)

18 November 2018–19 UEFA Nations League	Greece	0–1	Estonia	Athens, Greece
21:45 (UTC+2)		Report	Lampropoulos 44' (o.g.)	Stadium: Olympic Stadium; Attendance: 5,179; Referee: Yevhen Aranovskiy (Ukraine)

== 2019 ==
11 January Non-FIFA Friendly	Finland	1–2	Estonia	Doha, Qatar
15:00 (UTC+3)	Karjalainen 81'	Report	Kams 35'; Anier 62'	Stadium: Khalifa International Stadium; Attendance: 200; Referee: Khalid Al-Shaqsi (Oman)

15 January Non-FIFA Friendly	Iceland	0–0	Estonia	Doha, Qatar
19:45 (UTC+3)		Report		Stadium: Jassim Bin Hamad Stadium; Attendance: 35; Referee: Abdulla Ali Al-Marri (Qatar)

21 March UEFA Euro 2020 qualifying	Northern Ireland	2–0	Estonia	Belfast, Northern Ireland
19:45 (UTC±0)	McGinn 56'; Davis 75' (pen.)	Report		Stadium: Windsor Park; Attendance: 18,176; Referee: Ivan Bebek (Croatia)

26 March Friendly	Gibraltar	0–1	Estonia	Gibraltar
20:45 (UTC+1)		Report	Vassiljev 53'	Stadium: Victoria Stadium; Attendance: 1,900; Referee: Nick Walsh (Scotland)

8 June UEFA Euro 2020 qualifying	Estonia	1–2	Northern Ireland	Tallinn, Estonia
19:00 (UTC+3)	Vassiljev 25'	Report	Washington 77'; Magennis 80'	Stadium: A. Le Coq Arena; Attendance: 8,378; Referee: Fábio Veríssimo (Portugal)

11 June UEFA Euro 2020 qualifying	Germany	8–0	Estonia	Mainz, Germany
20:45 (UTC+2)	Reus 10', 37'; Gnabry 17', 62'; Goretzka 20'; Gündoğan 26' (pen.); Werner 79'; Sané 88'	Report		Stadium: Opel Arena; Attendance: 26,050; Referee: Ali Palabıyık (Turkey)

6 September UEFA Euro 2020 qualifying	Estonia	1–2	Belarus	Tallinn, Estonia
19:00 (UTC+3)	Sorga 54'	Report	Naumov 48'; Skavysh 90+2'	Stadium: A. Le Coq Arena; Attendance: 7,314; Referee: Alain Durieux (Luxembourg)

9 September UEFA Euro 2020 qualifying	Estonia	0–4	Netherlands	Tallinn, Estonia
21:45 (UTC+3)		Report	Babel 17', 48'; Depay 76'; Wijnaldum 87'	Stadium: A. Le Coq Arena; Attendance: 11,006; Referee: Serhiy Boiko (Ukraine)

10 October UEFA Euro 2020 qualifying	Belarus	0–0	Estonia	Minsk, Belarus
19:00 (UTC+3)		Report		Stadium: Dinamo Stadium; Attendance: 11,300; Referee: Ricardo de Burgos Bengoetxea (Spain)

13 October UEFA Euro 2020 qualifying	Estonia	0–3	Germany	Tallinn, Estonia
21:45 (UTC+3)		Report	Gündoğan 51'; Mets 57' (o.g.); Werner 71'	Stadium: A. Le Coq Arena; Attendance: 12,062; Referee: Georgi Kabakov (Bulgaria)

14 November Friendly	Ukraine	1–0	Estonia	Zaporizhia, Ukraine
19:00 (UTC+2)	Bezus 90+2'	Report		Stadium: Slavutych Arena; Attendance: 11,756; Referee: Juan Martínez Munuera (Spain)

19 November UEFA Euro 2020 qualifying	Netherlands	5–0	Estonia	Amsterdam, Netherlands
20:45 (UTC+1)	Wijnaldum 6', 66', 79'; Aké 19'; Boadu 87'	Report		Stadium: Johan Cruijff ArenA; Attendance: 50,286; Referee: Davide Massa (Italy)

== See also ==
- Estonia national football team results (1920–1940)
- Estonia national football team results (1991–2009)
- Estonia national football team results (2020–present)
- Estonia national football team all-time record
- List of Estonia international footballers
