= Jaroslav Dittrich =

Czech football player

Personal information
- Date of birth: 8 March 1982 (age 44)
- Place of birth: Czechoslovakia
- Height: 1.75 m (5 ft 9 in)
- Position: Midfielder

Team information
- Current team: FC Oberlausitz Neugersdorf

Senior career*
Years	Team	Apps	(Gls)
2006–2007	FK Baník Sokolov	15	(2)
2007–2010	FK Mladá Boleslav	15	(1)
2007–2008	→ Slovan Liberec (loan)	9	(0)
2009–2010	→ Bohemians Prague (loan)	21	(0)
2010–2011	FK Baník Sokolov	27	(3)
2012–	FC Oberlausitz Neugersdorf	16	(2)
- * Club domestic league appearances and goals as of 30 July 2013

Jaroslav Dittrich (born 8 March 1982 in Prague, Czech Republic) is a Czech football player who has made more than 40 appearances in the Gambrinus Liga, the top Czech football league.
