= Luboš Hušek =

Czech footballer

Personal information
- Date of birth: 26 January 1984 (age 42)
- Place of birth: Jablonec, Czechoslovakia
- Height: 1.86 m (6 ft 1 in)
- Position: Midfielder

Youth career
- 1989–1994: TJ Elitex Jablonec nad Nisou
- 1994–2002: Jablonec

Senior career*
Years	Team	Apps	(Gls)
2002–2006	Jablonec	53	(3)
2006	→ Sparta Prague (loan)	6	(0)
2007–2012	Sparta Prague	63	(1)
2013–2014	Slovan Liberec	13	(2)
2014–2017	Senica	60	(0)

International career
2005–2007	Czech Republic U21	15	(0)
2009	Czech Republic	1	(0)
- * Club domestic league appearances and goals

Luboš Hušek (born 26 January 1984) is a Czech former footballer, whose position was defensive midfielder. After starting his career with Jablonec, Sparta Prague signed him as a replacement for the departed Tomáš Sivok. In 2013 he joined Slovan Liberec, before finishing his career in Slovakia at FK Senica.
