= Václav Ježdík =

Czech footballer (born 1987)

Personal information
- Full name: Václav Ježdík
- Date of birth: 3 July 1987 (age 39)
- Place of birth: Prague, Czechoslovakia
- Height: 1.74 m (5 ft 9 in)
- Position: Defender

Team information
- Current team: Podbrezová

Senior career*
Years	Team	Apps	(Gls)
2009–2010	Bohemians	8	(0)
2010–2011	Varnsdorf	14	(1)
2011–2013	Teplice	35	(0)
2013	Dynamo České Budějovice	18	(0)
2013–2014	Bohemians	11	(1)
2015	Kolín	13	(0)
2015–	Ostrava	14	(0)
2016–	→ Podbrezová (loan)	11	(1)
- * Club domestic league appearances and goals as of 26 February 2016

Václav Ježdík (born 3 July 1987) is a Czech football player who currently plays for FO ŽP Šport Podbrezová, on loan from FC Baník Ostrava.
