= Pavel Kučera (footballer) =

Czech footballer

Personal information
- Date of birth: 2 July 1976 (age 50)
- Place of birth: Most, Czechoslovakia
- Height: 1.90 m (6 ft 3 in)
- Position: Goalkeeper

Youth career
- 1982–1989: Chemopetrol Litvnínov
- 1989–1995: FK Teplice

Senior career*
Years	Team	Apps	(Gls)
1999–2000	FK Teplice		
2000–2001	Chmel Blšany		
2001–2004	Viktoria Žižkov	14	(0)
2004–2007	Mladá Boleslav	24	(0)
2007–2013	Dynamo České Budějovice	119	(0)
2012	→ DAC Dunajská Streda (loan)	15	(0)
2012	USC Litschau		
- * Club domestic league appearances and goals as of 31 May 2012

Pavel Kučera (born 2 July 1976) is a Czech footballer, who memorably played for Dynamo České Budějovice as a goalkeeper. He played for Viktoria Žižkov in the 2002–03 UEFA Cup.
