= Tomáš Stráský =

Czech football player

Personal information
- Date of birth: 15 April 1987 (age 39)
- Place of birth: České Budějovice, Czechoslovakia
- Height: 1.87 m (6 ft 2 in)
- Position: Forward

Senior career*
Years	Team	Apps	(Gls)
2007–2011	České Budějovice	87	(10)
- * Club domestic league appearances and goals

Tomáš Stráský (born 15 April 1987) is a Czech retired footballer. He played the position of centre-forward. Stráský retired on 1 July 2020 at the age of 33.
