= Daniel Tarczal =

Czech footballer

Personal information
- Date of birth: 22 March 1985 (age 41)
- Place of birth: Beroun, Czechoslovakia
- Height: 1.75 m (5 ft 9 in)
- Position: Midfielder

Team information
- Current team: 1. FK Příbram
- Number: 6

Youth career
- 1991–1999: KDC Beroun
- 1999–2004: 1. FK Příbram

Senior career*
Years	Team	Apps	(Gls)
2004–	1. FK Příbram	88	(3)
- * Club domestic league appearances and goals as of 17 May 2010

Daniel Tarczal (born 22 March 1985) is a professional Czech footballer.
