= Hudson (footballer, born 1986) =

Brazilian footballer

Personal information
- Full name: Hudson Fernando Tobias de Carvalho
- Date of birth: 18 July 1986 (age 40)
- Place of birth: Sorocaba, Brazil
- Height: 1.72 m (5 ft 8 in)
- Position: Right back

Youth career
- Atlético Sorocaba

Senior career*
Years	Team	Apps	(Gls)
2005–2007	Atlético Sorocaba		
2006	→ Nõmme Kalju (loan)		
2007–2008	Slovan Liberec	14	(0)
2008–2013	Dynamo České Budějovice	108	(5)
2013	Paulista	9	(1)
2013–2014	Treze	20	(1)
2014–2015	Fortaleza	3	(0)
2016	CSA	0	(0)
2017	Rio Claro	0	(0)
2017	Bangu	4	(0)
2018	Rio Claro	0	(0)
2018	América-RN	4	(0)
2018	Jataiense	0	(0)
2019	Portuguesa	0	(0)
2020–	Imperatriz	0	(0)
- * Club domestic league appearances and goals as of 18 August 2018

Hudson Fernando Tobias de Carvalho (born 18 July 1986), simply known as Hudson, is a Brazilian former footballer who played as a right back.
