= Peter Mráz (footballer, born 1985) =

Slovak footballer

Personal information
- Date of birth: 4 May 1985 (age 41)
- Place of birth: Nové Zámky, Czechoslovakia
- Height: 1.88 m (6 ft 2 in)
- Position: Defender

Team information
- Current team: FC MAS Táborsko

Youth career
- 1991–2000: Vráble
- 2000–2002: FC Kmeťovo

Senior career*
Years	Team	Apps	(Gls)
2002–2005	OFK Veľký Lapáš		
2005–2009	Zenit Čáslav		
2009–2010	Kladno	30	(0)
2010	Spartak Trnava	12	(0)
2011–2012	Karviná		
2012–	Táborsko		
- * Club domestic league appearances and goals as of 25 June 2010 ‡ National team caps and goals as of 16 June 2012

Peter Mráz (born 4 May 1985) is a Slovak football defender.

In summer 2009, he was transferred from FC Zenit Čáslav to SK Kladno.
