= Antti Munukka =

Finnish football referee (born 1982)

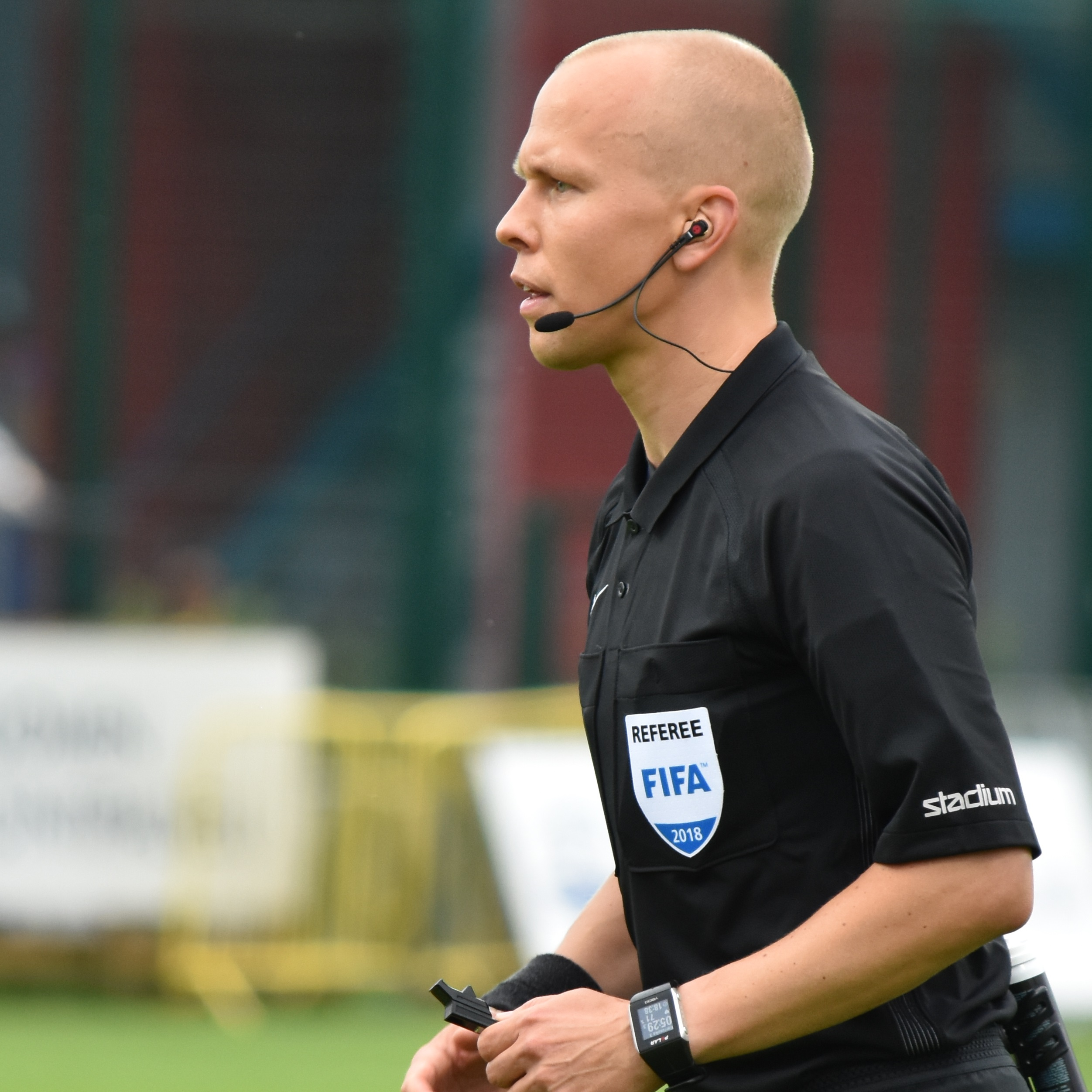
- Munukka in 2018
- Born: 3 March 1982 (age 44); Finland

Domestic
Years	League	Role

International
Years	League	Role
2010–	FIFA listed	Referee

Antti Munukka (born 3 March 1982) is a Finnish international referee who refereed at 2014 FIFA World Cup qualifiers.
