= 2011–12 Premier League of Bosnia and Herzegovina =

Premijer Liga
- Season: 2011–12
- Champions: Željezničar; 4th Premier League title 5th Bosnian title 6th Domestic title
- Relegated: Sloboda; Kozara
- Champions League: Željezničar
- Europa League: Široki Brijeg; Borac; Sarajevo
- Matches: 240
- Goals: 600 (2.5 per match)
- Top goalscorer: Eldin Adilović (19 goals)
- Biggest home win: Borac 6–0 GOŠK
- Biggest away win: Kozara 0–6 Olimpik
- Highest scoring: Kozara 6–2 Slavija; Travnik 3–5 Široki Brijeg (8 goals)
- Longest winning run: 12 matches Željezničar
- Longest unbeaten run: 26 matches Željezničar
- Longest winless run: 16 matches Kozara
- Longest losing run: 7 matches Slavija; Kozara
- Highest attendance: 12,000; Željezničar 1–0 Sarajevo
- Lowest attendance: 50^{1} Olimpic 1–0 Rudar

The 2011–12 Premier League of Bosnia and Herzegovina was the twelfth season of the Premier League of Bosnia and Herzegovina, the highest football league of Bosnia and Herzegovina. The 2011–12 fixtures were announced on 5 July 2011. The season began on 6 August 2011 and ended on 23 May 2012. A winter break with no matches was scheduled between 28 November and 3 March, but was extended for a week due to heavy snowfalls. Borac lost their title from the previous season to Željezničar, which secured the first position after round 27, with 3 matches left to play.

Sixteen clubs participated in the season, including fourteen returning from the 2010–11 season and one promoted club from each second-level league.

== Teams ==
Budućnost Banovići and Drina Zvornik were relegated to their respective second-level league at the end of the 2010–11 season. Both clubs returned to the second tier after just one year each at the Premijer Liga.

The relegated teams were replaced by the champions of the two second-level leagues, GOŠK Gabela from the Prva Liga FBiH and Kozara Gradiška from the Prva Liga RS. After eight years in the second level, Kozara returned to the top league and GOŠK debuted in the top level.

=== Stadiums and locations ===
Location of clubs in 2011–12 Premijer Liga

Team	Location	Stadium	Capacity
Borac	Banja Luka	Banja Luka City Stadium	7,238
Čelik	Zenica	Bilino Polje	15,292
GOŠK	Gabela	Podavala Stadium^{1}	2,800
Kozara	Gradiška	Gradski stadion (Gradiška)	5,000
Leotar	Trebinje	Police Stadium	8,550
Olimpic	Sarajevo	Stadion Otoka^{2}	3,000
Rudar	Prijedor	Gradski stadion (Prijedor)	5,000
Sarajevo	Sarajevo	Asim Ferhatović Hase Stadium	35,630
Slavija	Istočno Sarajevo	Gradski SRC Slavija	6,000
Sloboda	Tuzla	Stadion Tušanj	8,444
Široki Brijeg	Široki Brijeg	Stadion Pecara	5,628
Travnik	Travnik	Stadion Pirota	3,200
Velež	Mostar	Stadion Vrapčići	5,294
Zrinjski	Mostar	Bijeli Brijeg Stadium	20,000
Zvijezda	Gradačac	Banja Ilidža	5,000
Željezničar	Sarajevo	Stadion Grbavica	16,100

^{1} GOŠK played their first home game (round 2) in Čitluk, Bare Stadium, on 14 August 2011 against Sarajevo as their stadium, Podavala, still was under renovation.
^{2} Olimpic played their first three home matches (round 2, 5 and 7) on Asim Ferhatović Hase Stadium as their stadium was under reconstruction and renovation. They returned on Otoka Stadium after more than 2 years in round 9 on 2 October 2011 against GOŠK. They also played their first home game in the second half-season, on 10 March 2012, in round 16, against Rudar, at Bare Stadium in Čitluk, as heavy snowfalls during winter in Sarajevo disabled Otoka Stadium for any football games.

=== Personnel and kits ===
Note: Flags indicate national team as has been defined under FIFA eligibility rules. Players may hold more than one non-FIFA nationality.

Team	Manager	Captain	Kit manufacturer	Shirt Sponsor
Borac	(Serbia) Slaviša Božičić	(Bosnia and Herzegovina) Draško Žarić	NAAI	
Čelik	(Bosnia and Herzegovina) Vlatko Glavaš	(Bosnia and Herzegovina) Emir Hadžić	Joma	RM-LH
GOŠK	(Bosnia and Herzegovina) Boris Gavran	(Bosnia and Herzegovina) Vedad Šabanović	Jako	Habitus / Ledo
Kozara	(Bosnia and Herzegovina) Miloš Pojić	(Bosnia and Herzegovina) Nenad Studen	NAAI	Stihl
Leotar	(Bosnia and Herzegovina) Borče Sredojević	(Bosnia and Herzegovina) (Serbia) Zdravko Šaraba	Kappa	Elnos
Olimpic	(Bosnia and Herzegovina) Nedim Jusufbegović		Jako	Europlakat
Rudar	(Bosnia and Herzegovina) Velimir Stojnić	(Bosnia and Herzegovina) Goran Kotaran	Legea	Optima / ArcelorMittal
Sarajevo	(Bosnia and Herzegovina) Dragan Jović	(Bosnia and Herzegovina) Sedin Torlak	Lescon	AurA
Slavija	(Serbia) Vlado Čapljić	(Bosnia and Herzegovina) Goran Simić	adidas	Red Star Sport / Nova Banka
Sloboda	(Bosnia and Herzegovina) Abdulah Ibraković	(Bosnia and Herzegovina) Denis Mujkić	Jako	–
Široki Brijeg	(Slovenia) Marijan Bloudek	(Bosnia and Herzegovina) (Croatia) Dalibor Šilić	Jako	Mepas
Travnik	(Bosnia and Herzegovina) Husnija Arapović	(Bosnia and Herzegovina) Elvedin Varupa	Joma	ADK
Velež	(Bosnia and Herzegovina) Asmir Džafić		NAAI	Bosnalijek
Zrinjski	(Bosnia and Herzegovina) (Croatia) Dragan Perić (caretaker)	(Croatia) Damir Džidić	Zeus	HT-ERONET
Zvijezda	(Serbia) Zoran Kuntić	(Bosnia and Herzegovina) Amir Hamzić	Zeus	–
Željezničar	(Bosnia and Herzegovina) Amar Osim	(Bosnia and Herzegovina) Mirsad Bešlija	Macron	CODE

=== Managerial changes ===
Team	Outgoing manager	Manner of departure	Date of vacancy	Position in table	Replaced by	Date of appointment
Borac	(Bosnia and Herzegovina) Vlado Jagodić	Mutual agreement	28 May 2011	Off-season	(Croatia) Zvjezdan Cvetković	4 June 2011
Široki Brijeg	(Bosnia and Herzegovina) Blaž Slišković	Signed by Al-Ansar	31 May 2011	Off-season	(Bosnia and Herzegovina) Mario Ćutuk	4 June 2011
Leotar	(Bosnia and Herzegovina) Dragan Spaić	Renamed to first assistant	8 June 2011	Off-season	(Bosnia and Herzegovina) Slavko Jović	8 June 2011
Rudar	(Bosnia and Herzegovina) Boris Gavran	End of contract	13 June 2011	Off-season	(Bosnia and Herzegovina) Dragan Radović	13 June 2011
Čelik	(Bosnia and Herzegovina) Abdulah Ibraković	Mutual agreement	20 June 2011	Off-season	(Bosnia and Herzegovina) Boris Gavran	20 June 2011
Sarajevo	(Bosnia and Herzegovina) Mirza Varešanović	Dismissed	25 June 2011	Off-season	(Czech Republic) Jiří Plíšek	25 June 2011
Velež	(Bosnia and Herzegovina) Milomir Odović	End of contract	1 July 2011	Off-season	(Bosnia and Herzegovina) Mirza Varešanović	6 July 2011
Široki Brijeg	(Bosnia and Herzegovina) Mario Ćutuk	Mutual agreement	9 July 2011	Off-season	(Croatia) Branko Karačić	9 July 2011
Olimpic	(Bosnia and Herzegovina) Mehmed Janjoš	Mutual agreement	15 Aug 2011	10th	(Bosnia and Herzegovina) Nedim Jusufbegović	15 Aug 2011
Čelik	(Bosnia and Herzegovina) Boris Gavran	Mutual agreement	23 Aug 2011	16th	(Bosnia and Herzegovina) Elvedin Beganović (caretaker)	23 Aug 2011
Leotar	(Bosnia and Herzegovina) Slavko Jović	Dismissed	2 Sep 2011	13th	(Serbia) Bogdan Korak	2 Sep 2011
GOŠK	(Croatia) Darko Dražić	Signed by SMK FC	6 Sep 2011	15th	(Bosnia and Herzegovina) Milomir Odović	8 Sep 2011
Slavija	(Bosnia and Herzegovina) Dragan Bjelica	Resigned	12 Sep 2011	13th	(Bosnia and Herzegovina) Aleksandar Simić (caretaker)	12 Sep 2011
Travnik	(Bosnia and Herzegovina) Nedžad Selimović	Dismissed	17 Sep 2011	11th	(Croatia) Mesud Duraković	19 Sep 2011
Kozara	(Bosnia and Herzegovina) Vinko Marinović	Resigned	18 Sep 2011	15th	(Bosnia and Herzegovina) Vlado Jagodić	20 Sep 2011
Slavija	(Bosnia and Herzegovina) Aleksandar Simić (caretaker)	End of tenure as caretaker	23 Sep 2011	15th	(Bosnia and Herzegovina) Zoran Erbez	23 Sep 2011
Sloboda	(Bosnia and Herzegovina) Ibrahim Crnkić	Resigned	24 Sep 2011	11th	(Bosnia and Herzegovina) Darko Vojvodić	28 Sep 2011
Čelik	(Bosnia and Herzegovina) Elvedin Beganović (caretaker)	Promoted	25 Sep 2011	10th	(Bosnia and Herzegovina) Elvedin Beganović (official manager)	25 Sep 2011
Travnik	(Croatia) Mesud Duraković	Dismissed	28 Sep 2011	14th	(Bosnia and Herzegovina) Nermin Bašić	30 Sep 2011
Borac	(Croatia) Zvjezdan Cvetković	Dismissed	3 Oct 2011	4th	(Bosnia and Herzegovina) Velimir Stojnić	3 Oct 2011
Travnik	(Bosnia and Herzegovina) Nermin Bašić	Renamed to first assistant	10 Oct 2011	9th	(Bosnia and Herzegovina) Haris Jaganjac	10 Oct 2011
Sarajevo	(Czech Republic) Jiří Plíšek	Resigned	20 Dec 2011	3rd	(Bosnia and Herzegovina) Dragan Jović	6 Jan 2012
Leotar	(Serbia) Bogdan Korak	Dismissed	21 Dec 2011	14th	(Bosnia and Herzegovina) Borče Sredojević	21 Dec 2011
Zvijezda	(Bosnia and Herzegovina) Dragan Jović	Signed by Sarajevo	6 Jan 2012	9th	(Serbia) Zoran Kuntić	13 Jan 2012
Travnik	(Bosnia and Herzegovina) Haris Jaganjac	Dismissed	11 Jan 2012	15th	(Bosnia and Herzegovina) Husnija Arapović	11 Jan 2012
Slavija	(Bosnia and Herzegovina) Zoran Erbez	Resigned	17 Jan 2012	16th	(Serbia) Milan Gutović	17 Jan 2012
GOŠK	(Bosnia and Herzegovina) Milomir Odović	Resigned	27 Jan 2012	12th	(Bosnia and Herzegovina) Boris Gavran	30 Jan 2012
Borac	(Bosnia and Herzegovina) Velimir Stojnić	Resigned	17 Mar 2012	4th	(Serbia) Slaviša Božičić	19 Mar 2012
Široki Brijeg	(Croatia) Branko Karačić	Dismissed	19 Mar 2012	2nd	(Slovenia) Marijan Bloudek	20 Mar 2012
Slavija	(Serbia) Milan Gutović	Resigned	20 Mar 2012	16th	(Serbia) Vlado Čapljić	20 Mar 2012
Čelik	(Bosnia and Herzegovina) Elvedin Beganović	Resigned	22 Mar 2012	7th	(Bosnia and Herzegovina) Amir Japaur (caretaker)	22 Mar 2012
Rudar	(Bosnia and Herzegovina) Dragan Radović	Dismissed	25 Mar 2012	12th	(Bosnia and Herzegovina) Velimir Stojnić	26 Mar 2012
Čelik	(Bosnia and Herzegovina) Amir Japaur (caretaker)	End of tenure as caretaker	28 Mar 2012	9th	(Bosnia and Herzegovina) Vlatko Glavaš	28 Mar 2012
Velež	(Bosnia and Herzegovina) Mirza Varešanović	Resigned	19 Apr 2012	10th	(Bosnia and Herzegovina) Adnan Dizdarević (caretaker)	19 Apr 2012
Velež	(Bosnia and Herzegovina) Adnan Dizdarević (caretaker)	End of tenure as caretaker	24 Apr 2012	10th	(Bosnia and Herzegovina) Asmir Džafić	24 Apr 2012
Zrinjski	(Bosnia and Herzegovina) (Croatia) Slaven Musa	Resigned	29 Apr 2012	6th	(Bosnia and Herzegovina) Draženko Bogdan (caretaker)	2 May 2012
Kozara	(Bosnia and Herzegovina) Vlado Jagodić	Resigned	30 Apr 2012	16th	(Bosnia and Herzegovina) Siniša Đurić (caretaker)	1 May 2012
Sloboda	(Bosnia and Herzegovina) Darko Vojvodić	Resigned	30 Apr 2012	15th	(Bosnia and Herzegovina) Abdulah Ibraković	3 May 2012
Kozara	(Bosnia and Herzegovina) Siniša Đurić	End of tenure as caretaker	3 May 2012	16th	(Bosnia and Herzegovina) Miloš Pojić	3 May 2012
Zrinjski	(Bosnia and Herzegovina) Draženko Bogdan (caretaker)	End of tenure as caretaker	11 May 2012	6th	(Bosnia and Herzegovina) (Croatia) Dragan Perić (caretaker)	11 May 2012

== Season events ==
=== Incident in Travnik–Borac game ===
The match between Travnik and Borac was abandoned during halftime after the main referee of the match was attacked by a member of Travnik. The disciplinary commission fined Travnik €2,500 and pronounced that the team would play their next two home matches without spectators, though this was later reduced to a single match.

=== Away fans ban ===
The ban on away fans commenced on 8 October 2011 by the Football Federation of Bosnia and Herzegovina after a pair of incidents caused by Ultras groups. Intended to end in 2011, the ban was extended to the start of the 2012–13 season.

Several incidents preceded the ban:

- In the 21 August 2011 match between Zrinjski and Olimpic, members of Ultras Mostar (a Zrinjski fan club), angrily stormed the field after Olimpic scored their third goal.
- In the 24 August 2011 match between Slavija and Sarajevo, Sokolovi (a Slavija fan club) chanted insulting jeers during the game. Later in the match, ten people managed to enter the field during play. Zrinjski was penalized with a €2,000 fine, while Slavija received a €4,000 fine and were prohibited spectators at their following two home games.
- In the eighth round match between Borac and Željezničar, immediately after Željezničar took the lead, the Lešinari Ultras (a Borac fan club) broke through the emergency exit. They stormed the field and attacked The Maniacs (a Željezničar fan club) with flares and stones. Several Maniacs were wounded in the altercation. The competition commission registered the game as a 0–3 win for Željezničar, while the disciplinary commission punished Borac with a €5,000 fine and banned spectators from their next three home games.
- In the 28 September 2011 match between Zrinjski and Velež at Bijeli Brijeg Stadium, after Velež took the lead in the final minutes of the game, Ultras Mostar broke into the field and chased the Velež players. Zrinjski was punished for this incident by the disciplinary commission with a €5,000 fine and were forced to play their next five home matches without spectators. The game was registered with an official result of 0–3 for Velež.
- The final incident before the ban occurred in Sarajevo before the friendly match between Željezničar and Hajduk from Croatia. Torcida Split (a Hajduk fanclub) came to the stadium three hours before the match. Because of the small number of police officers at the stadium at that point, they were able to enter the south stand of Grbavica stadium. In the stands, a small group of The Maniacs were preparing the tifo (fan choreography) for the match. The members of Torcida Split began disrupting this, provoking an altercation that spiraled into a riot. The game was cancelled due to this.

The ban was lifted on 31 July 2012, before the start of the 2012–13 Premier League of Bosnia and Herzegovina.

== League table ==
Pos	Team	Pld	W	D	L	GF	GA	GD	Pts	Qualification or relegation
1	Željezničar (C)	30	22	5	3	68	17	+51	71	Qualification to Champions League second qualifying round
2	Široki Brijeg	30	18	9	3	48	17	+31	63	Qualification to Europa League second qualifying round (Note: As Željezničar also won the national cup, their slot as the cup winner was taken by the second-placed team in the league, Široki Brijeg. As Široki Brijeg was also the runner-up in the cup, the fourth placed team on the league table also qualified for UEFA Europa League.)
3	Borac Banja Luka	30	17	4	9	46	26	+20	55	Qualification to Europa League first qualifying round
4	Sarajevo	30	16	6	8	48	31	+17	54	Qualification to Europa League first qualifying round
5	Olimpic	30	15	7	8	44	23	+21	52	
6	Zrinjski	30	12	9	9	47	41	+6	45	
7	Zvijezda	30	13	6	11	37	35	+2	45	
8	Travnik	30	10	5	15	42	53	−11	35	
9	Čelik	30	8	10	12	31	39	−8	34	
10	Rudar Prijedor	30	10	4	16	30	46	−16	34	
11	Velež	30	8	9	13	28	35	−7	33	
12	Leotar	30	9	6	15	27	40	−13	33	
13	GOŠK Gabela	30	8	9	13	26	43	−17	33	
14	Slavija	30	10	2	18	36	61	−25	32 (Note: Slavija ahead of Sloboda Tuzla on head-to-head record: Sloboda Tuzla–Slavija 1–0, Slavija–Sloboda Tuzla 2–0.)	
15	Sloboda Tuzla (R)	30	10	2	18	23	48	−25	32	Relegation to Prva Liga FBiH
16	Kozara (R)	30	4	7	19	19	45	−26	19	Relegation to Prva Liga RS

Source: SportSport.ba (in Bosnian)
Rules for classification: 1st points; 2nd goal difference; 3rd goals scored
For deciding champions, qualification to UEFA Europa League and relegation: 1st points; 2nd head-to-head points; 3rd head-to-head goal difference; 4th head-to-head goals scored; 5th head-to-head away goals scored; 6th goal difference; 7th goals scored
(C) Champions; (R) Relegated

=== Positions by round ===
Team ╲ Round	1	2	3	4	5	6	7	8	9	10	11	12	13	14	15	16	17	18	19	20	21	22	23	24	25	26	27	28	29	30
Željezničar	12	7	11	9	6	7	5	4	3	3	2	2	2	2	1	1	1	1	1	1	1	1	1	1	1	1	1	1	1	1
Široki Brijeg	3	4	4	4	4	3	2	1	1	1	1	1	1	1	2	2	2	2	2	2	2	2	2	2	2	2	2	2	2	2
Borac Banja Luka	4	3	3	2	2	2	3	3	4	5	4	5	4	4	4	4	4	4	4	3	4	4	4	4	4	4	4	4	3	3
Sarajevo	1	1	1	1	1	1	1	2	2	2	3	3	3	3	3	3	3	3	3	4	3	3	3	3	3	3	3	3	4	4
Olimpic	8	10	7	10	12	15	12	8	7	6	6	6	6	6	6	6	6	6	5	5	5	5	5	5	6	5	5	5	5	5
Zrinjski	6	5	8	8	5	6	4	6	5	4	5	4	5	5	5	5	5	5	6	6	6	6	6	6	5	6	6	6	6	6
Zvijezda	11	12	14	12	14	11	14	15	13	12	12	14	7	10	9	8	8	7	7	7	7	8	7	7	7	7	7	7	7	7
Travnik	7	6	5	5	7	10	11	14	9	11	11	13	14	14	15	15	14	14	12	13	11	13	11	13	13	13	9	10	8	8
Čelik	14	15	16	15	16	16	13	10	10	9	13	8	8	7	7	7	7	9	9	9	9	7	8	9	10	12	12	9	10	9
Rudar Prijedor	9	13	10	14	8	12	8	7	11	13	8	10	10	9	10	10	11	12	13	10	10	9	9	11	9	10	8	11	12	10
Velež	2	2	2	3	3	4	6	5	6	7	7	7	9	8	8	9	9	8	8	8	8	10	10	8	8	8	10	8	9	11
Leotar	10	11	9	11	13	8	7	9	8	8	10	12	13	12	13	14	13	13	14	14	12	14	12	10	11	9	11	12	13	12
GOŠK Gabela	16	16	15	13	15	9	10	11	12	14	14	9	11	11	12	12	10	11	10	11	13	11	13	12	12	11	13	13	14	13
Slavija	5	9	6	7	10	13	15	16	16	16	16	16	16	16	16	16	16	16	16	16	16	15	15	14	14	14	14	15	15	14
Sloboda Tuzla	13	8	12	6	9	5	9	12	14	15	15	15	15	15	11	11	12	10	11	12	14	12	14	15	15	15	15	14	11	15
Kozara	15	14	13	16	11	14	16	13	15	10	9	11	12	13	14	13	15	15	15	15	15	16	16	16	16	16	16	16	16	16

Leader
2012–13 UEFA Europa League Second qualifying round
2012–13 UEFA Europa League First qualifying round
Relegation to 2012–13 Prva Liga FBiH or 2012–13 Prva Liga RS

Source: SportSport.ba
Notes: ^{1} Match in Round 12 between Čelik and Sloboda wasn't played in week 12, but was postponed for 16 November (between 13 and 14-week) to get Bilino Polje's pitch in a good shape for the play-off match for UEFA Euro 2012 between Bosnia and Herzegovina and Portugal which was scheduled for 11 November.

== Results ==
Home \ Away	BOR	ČEL	GŠK	KOZ	LEO	OLI	RPR	SAR	SLA	SLO	ŠB	TRA	VEL	ZRI	ZVI	ŽEL
Borac Banja Luka		2–0	6–0	1–0	3–1	1–0	3–1	2–0	3–2	4–1	0–0	1–0	3–0	2–1	1–2	0–3 (Note: Match Borac–Željezničar, in week 8, was abandoned after 34 minutes of game and on result of 0–1 because huligans of Borac entered the field and attacked Željezničar fans with stones and flares before special forces distanced them and calmed the situation. Some 45 minutes after the incident the official referee decided to empty the stadium and soon after to abandon the match. The disciplinary and contest commission awarded Željezničar with a technical win of 0–3, while "Gradski Stadion", Borac home stadium, got suspended for 3 matches.)
Čelik	0–0		2–0	2–0	2–3	1–0	3–0	1–1	1–2	1–0	0–0	2–2	1–1	1–3	2–1	1–1
GOŠK Gabela	1–0	0–0		0–0	2–1	3–0	3–0	1–4	1–2	1–4	1–2	3–1	0–0	0–0	2–1	0–1
Kozara	0–1	1–2	0–0		1–0	0–6	1–0	1–3	6–2	1–1	1–2	1–2	0–0	0–0	1–2	0–2
Leotar	3–0	0–0	0–0	1–0		0–1	1–0	1–0	2–0	2–0	0–0	1–1	0–1	1–2	0–0	2–1
Olimpic	2–1	1–0	0–0	2–0	4–1		1–0	1–0	2–0	2–0	0–0	1–2	0–0	3–0	2–0	0–1
Rudar Prijedor	1–3	0–0	3–0	3–0	2–0	1–1		1–2	0–1	2–0	1–1	4–0	1–0	3–2	1–0	0–5
Sarajevo	2–2	4–2	0–2	4–0	1–0	2–0	3–1		2–1	2–1	0–1	1–0	1–1	2–0	3–2	2–2
Slavija	0–2	2–0	1–0	2–1	2–3	2–2	1–1	0–4		2–0	2–0	3–0	0–1	1–2	3–1	1–5
Sloboda Tuzla	0–1	1–0	2–1	1–0	2–1	1–4	1–2	0–1	1–0		1–0	1–0	2–0	3–2	0–0	0–4
Široki Brijeg	1–1	1–0	2–0	1–0	5–1	1–1	3–0	3–1	5–0	2–0		3–1	2–0	1–1	0–0	2–1
Travnik	0–3 (Note: The disciplinary and contest commission awarded Borac a 0–3 win over Travnik in week 5, after the match was cancelled during the halftime when the referee stated that he was attacked in the tunnel. Travnik denies any connection with the attacks. The result on halftime was 1–1. "Pirota", Travniks home stadium, also got suspended for 2 matches (later it was reduced to only one match) and Travnik got a fine.)	3–4	1–1	0–0	2–0	2–1	3–0	1–2	3–0	3–0	3–5		3–2	2–2	2–1	2–1
Velež	1–0	2–1	1–2	0–0	1–1	1–3	0–1	0–0	3–0	3–0	0–2	4–1		3–1	1–1	1–2
Zrinjski	1–0	1–1	4–2	2–3	1–0	2–4	3–1	1–1	3–1	2–0	0–1	2–0	1–0		4–1	0–0
Zvijezda	2–0	2–1	0–0	1–0	4–1	1–0	2–0	2–0	4–2	1–0	0–2	3–2	2–0	1–1		0–3
Željezničar	1–0	5–0	5–0	2–1	2–0	0–0	3–0	1–0	3–1	4–0	1–0	1–0	4–1	3–3	1–0	

Source: SportSport.ba
Legend: Blue = home team win; Yellow = draw; Red = away team win.

=== Clubs season-progress ===
Team ╲ Round	1	2	3	4	5	6	7	8	9	10	11	12	13	14	15	16	17	18	19	20	21	22	23	24	25	26	27	28	29	30
Borac Banja Luka	W	W	D	W	W	W	L	L	L	D	W	L	W	W	W	W	L	D	W	W	L	W	L	L	W	W	W	L	W	D
Čelik	L	L	L	W	L	D	W	W	D	D	L	W	D	W	W	D	D	L	L	D	L	W	L	L	L	D	L	W	D	D
GOŠK Gabela	L	L	D	W	L	W	D	D	D	L	D	W	L	L	D	L	W	D	D	L	L	W	L	W	L	W	L	L	D	W
Kozara	L	L	D	D	W	L	L	W	L	W	D	D	L	L	L	L	D	D	D	L	L	L	L	L	L	L	W	L	L	L
Leotar	D	L	W	L	L	W	W	L	D	D	L	D	L	L	L	L	W	L	D	D	W	L	W	W	L	W	L	L	L	W
Olimpic	D	L	W	L	L	L	W	W	D	W	W	L	W	W	D	W	L	W	W	D	W	L	W	L	D	D	W	W	W	D
Rudar Prijedor	D	L	W	L	W	L	W	D	L	L	W	L	D	W	L	L	L	L	L	W	W	W	L	L	W	L	D	L	L	W
Sarajevo	W	W	D	W	W	W	L	L	W	W	D	W	L	W	L	W	L	D	W	D	W	W	L	W	W	W	L	D	L	D
Slavija	W	L	W	L	L	L	L	D	L	L	L	L	L	L	L	W	L	W	L	W	L	W	W	W	L	D	L	W	L	W
Sloboda Tuzla	L	W	L	W	L	W	L	L	L	D	L	L	W	L	W	L	D	W	L	L	L	W	L	L	L	L	W	W	W	L
Široki Brijeg	W	W	D	L	W	W	W	W	W	D	W	W	W	D	D	L	D	D	W	W	W	L	W	W	W	D	D	W	W	D
Travnik	D	W	W	L	L	L	D	L	W	L	D	D	L	L	L	L	W	L	W	L	W	L	W	L	L	W	W	L	W	D
Velež	W	W	D	D	W	L	L	W	L	L	L	D	L	W	D	D	W	D	D	D	L	L	L	W	D	L	L	W	L	L
Zrinjski	D	W	L	D	W	L	W	D	W	W	D	D	W	D	W	W	D	L	D	D	W	L	W	L	W	L	L	W	L	L
Zvijezda	D	L	L	W	L	W	L	L	W	D	D	D	W	L	W	W	D	W	L	D	L	L	W	W	W	L	W	L	W	W
Željezničar	L	W	L	D	W	D	W	W	W	W	W	W	W	W	W	W	W	W	D	D	W	W	W	W	W	W	W	D	W	L

Source: SportSport.ba
W = Win; D = Draw; L = Lose
Notes: ^{1} Match in Round 12 between Čelik and Sloboda wasn't played in week 12, but was postponed for 16 November (between 13 and 14-week) to get Bilino Polje's pitch in a good shape for the play-off match for UEFA Euro 2012 between Bosnia and Herzegovina and Portugal which was scheduled for 11 November.

== Season statistics ==
=== Top goalscorers ===
Rank	Player	Club	Goals
1	(Bosnia and Herzegovina) Eldin Adilović	Željezničar	19
2	(Serbia) Igor Aničić	Leotar	10
2	(Bosnia and Herzegovina) Haris Harba	Olimpic	10
2	(Bosnia and Herzegovina) Dejan Rašević	Slavija	10
2	(Bosnia and Herzegovina) Muamer Svraka	Željezničar	10
6	(Bosnia and Herzegovina) Saša Kajkut	Borac	9
6	(Serbia) Lazar Marjanović	Zrinjski	9
6	(Bosnia and Herzegovina) Vernes Selimović	Željezničar	9
9	6 players	8	
10	6 players	7	
11	9 players	6	
12	13 players	5	
13	11 players	4	
14	20 players	3	
15	57 players	2	
16	64 players	1	
-	17 players	OG	

=== Hat-Tricks ===
Player	For	Against	Result	Date
(Bosnia and Herzegovina) Dejan Kojić	Kozara	Slavija	6–2	27 August 2011
(Bosnia and Herzegovina) Mahir Karić	GOŠK	Rudar	3–0	11 September 2011
(Bosnia and Herzegovina) Eldin Adilović	Željezničar	Velež	4–1	23 October 2011
(Bosnia and Herzegovina) Eldin Adilović ^{4}	Željezničar	Rudar	0–5	17 March 2012
(Bosnia and Herzegovina) Muamer Svraka	Željezničar	Sloboda	0–4	28 April 2012

- ^{4} Player scored 4 goals

=== Clean sheets ===
- Most clean sheets: 19
  - Željezničar
- Fewest clean sheets: 5
  - Travnik

=== Champion squad ===
FK Željezničar
Goalkeepers: Adnan Gušo (21); Elvis Karić (6); Semir Bukvić (3).

Defenders: Jadranko Bogičević (28/3); Benjamin Čolić (26); Josip Kvesić (25/1); Velibor Vasilić (22); Elvir Čolić (11); Semir Kerla (5); Josip Ćutuk (4); (Montenegro) Goran Marković (3).

Midfielders: Zajko Zeba (28/7); Muamer Svraka (27/10); (Liberia) Patrick Nyema Gerhardt (24/1); Mirsad Bešlija (22/1); Nermin Jamak (21/3); Srđan Stanić (17); Samir Bekrić (13/5); Sulejman Smajić (13/2); Nermin Zolotić (11); (North Macedonia) Perica Stančeski (5); Haris Hajradinović (1).

Forwards: Eldin Adilović (29/20); Vernes Selimović (26/9); Mirsad Ramić (11/1).

(league appearances and goals listed in brackets)

Managers: Amar Osim.

Transferred out during the season: Srđan Savić (6/1, released); Dejan Drakul (2, released); Edin Višća (1, to Istanbul BB).

== Attendances ==
#	Club	Average
1	Željezničar	5,067
2	Sarajevo	3,533
3	Sloboda	1,483
4	Borac	1,393
5	Zvijezda	1,320
6	Čelik	1,273
7	Velež	1,127
8	Rudar	1,067
9	Široki	953
10	Kozara	893
11	Zrinjski	887
12	Olimpik	803
13	Slavija	740
14	Leotar	680
15	Travnik	667
16	GOŠK	588

== Notes ==
- ^{1}Without matches played on empty stadiums because of suspension.

== See also ==
- 2011–12 Kup Bosne i Hercegovine
- Football Federation of Bosnia and Herzegovina
