= Nenad Studen =

Bosnia and Herzegovina footballer

Personal information
- Full name: Nenad Studen
- Date of birth: 4 February 1979 (age 47)
- Place of birth: Banja Luka, SFR Yugoslavia
- Height: 1.88 m (6 ft 2 in)
- Position: Defensive midfielder

Senior career*
Years	Team	Apps	(Gls)
1999	Borac Banja Luka	9	(0)
2000	Partizan	0	(0)
2000–2002	Teleoptik	57	(0)
2002–2003	Borac Banja Luka	29	(2)
2003	Kozara Gradiška		
2004	Rudar Ugljevik		
2004–2005	Wisła Płock	11	(0)
2005–2006	Radomiak Radom	9	(1)
2006–2007	Kozara Gradiška		
2007–2008	Laktaši	19	(3)
2008	Kozara Gradiška		
2009	Sloga Trn		
2009–2012	Kozara Gradiška		
2012–2015	Krupa		

Managerial career
- 2019–2020: Krupa (assistant)
- * Club domestic league appearances and goals

Nenad Studen (Serbian Cyrillic: Ненад Студен, born 4 February 1979) is a Bosnian professional football manager and former player.

== Playing career ==
Studen started his career in hometown club, Borac Banja Luka in 1999. In 2000, he was signed by Serbian giants Partizan and came as a great talent. Fighting to get a place in the team, he was loaned to Partizan's satellite club Teleoptik for two seasons. In 2002, Studen returned to Borac, and after a year, he transferred to Rudar Ugljevik. In January 2005, he signed with Polish club Wisła Płock. Then, Studen played for one season ar Radomiak Radom before returning to Bosnia, joining Kozara Gradiška.

In 2007, he signed a contract with Laktaši. Studen started the 2008–09 season playing with Laktaši in the Bosnian Premier League, but he went back to Kozara where he played the first half of the season, while on the winter break he moved to Sloga Trn, playing in the First League of RS at the time. In the summer of 2009, Studen again came back to Kozara. In the 2010–11 season, he with Kozara got promoted back to the Bosnian Premier League, but got relegated immediately back to the First League of RS in the 2011–12 Bosnian Premier League season.

In July 2012, he signed with Krupa, playing for the club until July 2015, after which he retired from playing football at the age of 37.

== Managerial career ==
In 2019, Studen became the new assistant manager at Krupa, previously working as a coach in the youth team of the club.

== Honours ==
=== Player ===
Kozara Gradiška

- First League of RS: 2010–11

Krupa

- Second League of RS: 2013–14 (West)
