= 2012–13 UEFA Europa League =

42nd season of Europe's secondary club football tournament organised by UEFA

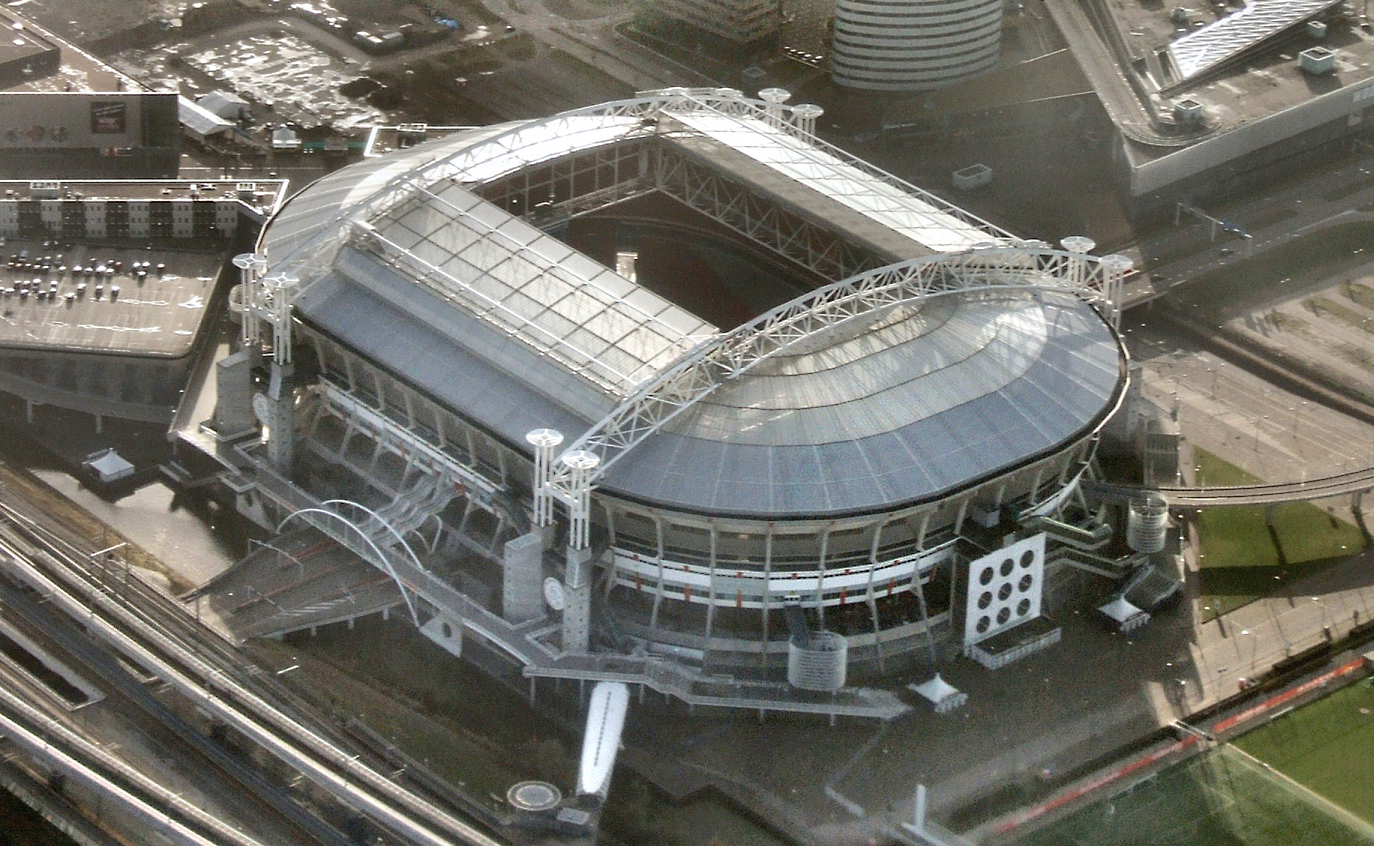
- The Amsterdam Arena in Amsterdam hosted the final

Tournament details
- Dates: 3 July – 30 August 2012 (qualifying); 20 September 2012 – 15 May 2013 (competition proper)
- Teams: 48+8 (competition proper); 161+32 (total) (from 53 associations)

Final positions
- Champions: (England) Chelsea (1st title)
- Runners-up: (Portugal) Benfica

Tournament statistics
- Matches played: 205
- Goals scored: 521 (2.54 per match)
- Attendance: 4,174,756 (20,365 per match)
- Top scorer(s): Libor Kozák (Lazio); 8 goals

The 2012–13 UEFA Europa League was the 42nd season of Europe's secondary club football tournament organised by UEFA, and the 4th season since it was renamed from the UEFA Cup to the UEFA Europa League.

The final was played at the Amsterdam Arena in Amsterdam, Netherlands. It was contested on 15 May 2013 between Portuguese club Benfica and English club Chelsea, who entered the competition at the Round of 32 after they finished in third place in the group stage of the 2012–13 Champions League. Chelsea won the final 2–1 for their first Europa League title, making them the fourth club – after Juventus, Ajax and Bayern Munich – and the first English club to have won all three major European trophies at the time (UEFA Champions League, Europa League, and the Cup Winners' Cup).

For the 2012–13 edition, the following changes were made from the 2011–12 edition:

- The cup winners of the six top-ranked associations had direct access to the UEFA Europa League group stage. This allocation of slots has a direct impact on the qualification path, and adaptations were made to the access list in order to accommodate these changes.
- Matchdays 5 and 6 were no longer held on exclusive weeks, but instead were played on the same weeks as Matchdays 5 and 6 of the UEFA Champions League.

Atlético Madrid were the defending champions, but were eliminated by Rubin Kazan in the Round of 32.

== Association team allocation ==
A total of 193 teams from 53 UEFA member associations participate in the 2012–13 UEFA Europa League. The association ranking based on the UEFA country coefficients is used to determine the number of participating teams for each association:

- Associations 1–6 each have three teams qualify
- Associations 7–9 each have four teams qualify
- Associations 10–51 (except Liechtenstein) each have three teams qualify
- Associations 52–53 each have two teams qualify
- Liechtenstein has one team qualify (as it organises only a domestic cup and no domestic league)
- The top three associations of the 2011–12 UEFA Respect Fair Play ranking each gain an additional berth
- Moreover, 32 teams eliminated from the 2012–13 UEFA Champions League are transferred to the Europa League (this is one fewer than usual as Tottenham Hotspur did not participate in the UEFA Champions League non-champions qualifying path due to Chelsea winning the 2011–12 UEFA Champions League)

The winners of the 2011–12 UEFA Europa League are given an additional entry as title holders if they do not qualify for the 2012–13 UEFA Champions League or Europa League through their domestic performance. However, this additional entry is not necessary for this season since the title holders qualified for European competitions through their domestic performance.

=== Association ranking ===
For the 2012–13 UEFA Europa League, the associations are allocated places according to their 2011 UEFA country coefficients, which takes into account their performance in European competitions from 2006–07 to 2010–11.

Apart from the allocation based on the association coefficients, associations could have additional teams participating in the Champions League, as noted below:

- (FP) – Additional berths for associations via the Fair Play ranking (Norway, Finland, Netherlands)
- (UCL) – Additional teams transferred from the UEFA Champions League

Rank	Association	Coeff	Teams	Notes
1	England	85.785	3	+1(UCL)
2	Spain	82.329	3	
3	Germany	69.436	3	+1(UCL)
4	Italy	60.552	3	+1(UCL)
5	France	53.678	3	
6	Portugal	51.596	3	+1(UCL)
7	Russia	44.707	4	+1(UCL)
8	Ukraine	43.883	4	+1(UCL)
9	Netherlands	40.129	4	+1(FP) +2(UCL)
10	Turkey	35.050	3	+1(UCL)
11	Greece	34.166	3	+2(UCL)
12	Denmark	30.550	3	+1(UCL)
13	Belgium	27.000	3	+1(UCL)
14	Romania	25.824	3	+2(UCL)
15	Scotland	25.141	3	+1(UCL)
16	Switzerland	24.900	3	+1(UCL)
17	Israel	22.000	3	+1(UCL)
18	Czech Republic	20.850	3	+1(UCL)

Rank	Association	Coeff	Teams	Notes
19	Austria	20.700	3	
20	Cyprus	18.124	3	+1(UCL)
21	Bulgaria	17.875	3	
22	Croatia	16.124	3	
23	Belarus	16.083	3	+1(UCL)
24	Poland	15.916	3	+1(UCL)
25	Slovakia	14.499	3	
26	Norway	14.375	3	+1(FP) +1(UCL)
27	Serbia	14.250	3	+1(UCL)
28	Sweden	14.125	3	+1(UCL)
29	Bosnia and Herzegovina	9.124	3	
30	Finland	8.966	3	+1(FP) +1(UCL)
31	Republic of Ireland	8.708	3	
32	Hungary	8.500	3	+1(UCL)
33	Moldova	7.749	3	+1(UCL)
34	Lithuania	7.708	3	+1(UCL)
35	Latvia	7.415	3	
36	Georgia	6.957	3	

Rank	Association	Coeff	Teams	Notes
37	Azerbaijan	6.165	3	+1(UCL)
38	Slovenia	6.124	3	+1(UCL)
39	Macedonia	5.207	3	
40	Iceland	4.957	3	
41	Kazakhstan	4.374	3	
42	Liechtenstein	4.000	1	
43	Montenegro	3.875	3	
44	Albania	3.874	3	
45	Estonia	3.791	3	
46	Wales	2.790	3	
47	Armenia	2.583	3	
48	Malta	2.416	3	
49	Northern Ireland	2.249	3	
50	Faroe Islands	1.416	3	
51	Luxembourg	1.374	3	+1(UCL)
52	Andorra	1.000	2	
53	San Marino	0.916	2	

=== Distribution ===
Due to the following reasons, changes to the default allocation system had to be made:

- The title holders, Atlético Madrid, were guaranteed a place in the Europa League group stage, since they did not qualify for the Champions League. However, they also qualified for the group stage through their domestic performance, as they finished fifth in the 2011–12 La Liga and Champions League-qualified Barcelona won the 2011–12 Copa del Rey. As a result, this spot in the group stage was vacated.
- Only 14 losers (instead of the default 15) from the 2012–13 UEFA Champions League third qualifying round entered the Europa League play-off round.

The following changes to the default allocation system were made to compensate for these vacated spots:

- The domestic cup winners of association 7 (Russia) were promoted from the play-off round to the group stage.
- The domestic cup winners of associations 16 and 17 (Switzerland and Israel) were promoted from the third qualifying round to the play-off round.
- The domestic cup winners of associations 19 and 20 (Austria and Cyprus) were promoted from the second qualifying round to the third qualifying round.
- The domestic cup winners of associations 33, 34, 35 and 36 (Moldova, Lithuania, Latvia and Georgia) were promoted from the first qualifying round to the second qualifying round.

	Teams entering in this round	Teams advancing from previous round	Teams transferred from Champions League
First qualifying round (74 teams)	17 domestic cup winners from associations 37–53; 25 domestic league runners-up from associations 28–53 (except Liechtenstein); 29 domestic league third-placed teams from associations 22–51 (except Liechtenstein); 3 teams which qualified via Fair Play ranking		
Second qualifying round (80 teams)	16 domestic cup winners from associations 21–36; 12 domestic league runners-up from associations 16–27; 6 domestic league third-placed teams from associations 16–21; 6 domestic league fourth-placed teams from associations 10–15; 3 domestic league fifth-placed teams from associations 7–9	37 winners from the first qualifying round	
Third qualifying round (58 teams)	3 domestic cup winners from associations 18–20; 6 domestic league third-placed teams from associations 10–15; 3 domestic league fourth-placed teams from associations 7–9; 3 domestic league fifth-placed teams from associations 4–6 (League Cup winners for France); 3 domestic league sixth-placed teams from associations 1–3 (League Cup winners for England)	40 winners from the second qualifying round	
Play-off round (62 teams)	10 domestic cup winners from associations 8–17; 3 domestic league third-placed teams from associations 7–9; 3 domestic league fourth-placed teams from associations 4–6; 3 domestic league fifth-placed teams from associations 1–3	29 winners from the third qualifying round	14 losers from the Champions League third qualifying round
Group stage (48 teams)	Title holders; 6 domestic cup winners from associations 1–7 (minus the spot vacated by Atlético Madrid)	31 winners from the play-off round	10 losers from the Champions League play-off round
Knockout phase (32 teams)		12 group winners from the group stage; 12 group runners-up from the group stage	8 third-placed teams from the Champions League group stage

==== Redistribution rules ====
A Europa League place is vacated when a team qualifies for both the Champions League and the Europa League, or qualifies for the Europa League by more than one method. When a place is vacated, it is redistributed within the national association by the following rules:

- When the domestic cup winners (considered as the "highest-placed" qualifier within the national association with the latest starting round) also qualify for the Champions League, their Europa League place is vacated. As a result, either of the following teams qualify for the Europa League:
  - The domestic cup runners-up, provided they have not yet qualified for European competitions, qualify for the Europa League as the "lowest-placed" qualifier (with the earliest starting round), with the other Europa League qualifiers moved up one "place".
  - Otherwise, the highest-placed team in the league which have not yet qualified for European competitions qualify for the Europa League, with the Europa League qualifiers which finish above them in the league moved up one "place".
- When the domestic cup winners also qualify for the Europa League through league position, their place through the league position is vacated. As a result, the highest-placed team in the league which have not yet qualified for European competitions qualify for the Europa League, with the Europa League qualifiers which finish above them in the league moved up one "place" if possible.
- For associations where a Europa League place is reserved for the League Cup winners, they always qualify for the Europa League as the "lowest-placed" qualifier (or as the second "lowest-placed" qualifier in cases where the cup runners-up qualify as stated above). If the League Cup winners have already qualified for European competitions through other methods, this reserved Europa League place is taken by the highest-placed league team in the league which have not yet qualified for European competitions.
- A Fair Play place is taken by the highest-ranked team in the domestic Fair Play table which have not yet qualified for European competitions.

=== Teams ===
The labels in the parentheses show how each team qualified for the place of its starting round:

- TH: Title holders
- CW: Cup winners
- CR: Cup runners-up
- LC: League Cup winners
- 2nd, 3rd, 4th, 5th, 6th, etc.: League position
- CL4R: League placed 4th but entered Europa League due to Champions League 4 teams per association rule
- P-W: End-of-season European competition play-offs winners
- FP: Fair Play
- UCL: Transferred from the Champions League
  - GS: Third-placed teams from the group stage
  - PO: Losers from the play-off round
  - Q3: Losers from the third qualifying round

Round of 32
(Ukraine) Dynamo Kyiv (UCL GS)	(Greece) Olympiacos (UCL GS)	(Russia) Zenit Saint Petersburg (UCL GS)	(Netherlands) Ajax (UCL GS)
(England) Chelsea (UCL GS)	(Belarus) BATE Borisov (UCL GS)	(Portugal) Benfica (UCL GS)	(Romania) CFR Cluj (UCL GS)
Group stage
(Spain) Atlético Madrid^{TH} (5th)	(Portugal) Académica (CW)	(Cyprus) AEL Limassol (UCL PO)	(Germany) Borussia Mönchengladbach (UCL PO)
(England) Tottenham Hotspur (4th)	(Russia) Rubin Kazan (CW)	(Slovenia) Maribor (UCL PO)	(Denmark) Copenhagen (UCL PO)
(Germany) Bayer Leverkusen (5th)	(Switzerland) Basel (UCL PO)	(Italy) Udinese (UCL PO)	
(Italy) Napoli (CW)	(Sweden) Helsingborgs IF (UCL PO)	(Turkey) Fenerbahçe (UCL PO)	
(France) Lyon (CW)	(Israel) Ironi Kiryat Shmona (UCL PO)	(Greece) Panathinaikos (UCL PO)	
Play-off round
(England) Newcastle United (5th)	(Netherlands) PSV Eindhoven (CW)	(Israel) Hapoel Tel Aviv (CW)	(Azerbaijan) Neftçi (UCL Q3)
(Spain) Levante (6th)	(Netherlands) AZ (4th)	(Luxembourg) F91 Dudelange (UCL Q3)	(Serbia) Partizan (UCL Q3)
(Germany) VfB Stuttgart (6th)	(Turkey) Trabzonspor (3rd)	(Hungary) Debrecen (UCL Q3)	(Romania) Vaslui (UCL Q3)
(Italy) Lazio (4th)	(Greece) Atromitos (4th)	(Czech Republic) Slovan Liberec (UCL Q3)	(Scotland) Motherwell (UCL Q3)
(France) Bordeaux (5th)	(Denmark) Midtjylland (3rd)	(Lithuania) Ekranas (UCL Q3)	(Belgium) Club Brugge (UCL Q3)
(Portugal) Sporting CP (4th)	(Belgium) Lokeren (CW)	(Poland) Śląsk Wrocław (UCL Q3)	(Netherlands) Feyenoord (UCL Q3)
(Russia) CSKA Moscow (3rd)	(Romania) Dinamo București (CW)	(Moldova) Sheriff Tiraspol (UCL Q3)	
(Ukraine) Metalist Kharkiv (3rd)	(Scotland) Heart of Midlothian (CW)	(Finland) HJK (UCL Q3)	
(Ukraine) Dnipro Dnipropetrovsk (4th)	(Switzerland) Luzern (2nd)	(Norway) Molde (UCL Q3)	
Third qualifying round
(England) Liverpool (LC)	(Portugal) Marítimo (5th)	(Greece) PAOK (5th)	(Czech Republic) Sparta Prague (2nd)
(Spain) Athletic Bilbao (CR)	(Russia) Dynamo Moscow (4th)	(Denmark) Horsens (4th)	(Austria) Rapid Wien (2nd)
(Germany) Hannover 96 (7th)	(Ukraine) Arsenal Kyiv (5th)	(Belgium) Genk (3rd)	(Cyprus) Omonia (CW)
(Italy) Internazionale (6th)	(Netherlands) Heerenveen (5th)	(Romania) Steaua București (3rd)	
(France) Marseille (LC)	(Turkey) Bursaspor (5th)	(Scotland) Dundee United (4th)	
Second qualifying round
(Russia) Anzhi Makhachkala (5th)	(Israel) Bnei Yehuda (3rd)	(Croatia) Hajduk Split (2nd)	(Serbia) Vojvodina (3rd)
(Ukraine) Metalurh Donetsk (CR)	(Israel) Maccabi Netanya (4th)	(Croatia) Slaven Belupo (3rd)	(Sweden) AIK (2nd)
(Netherlands) Vitesse (P-W)	(Czech Republic) Viktoria Plzeň (3rd)	(Belarus) Naftan Novopolotsk (CW)	(Bosnia and Herzegovina) Široki Brijeg (2nd)
(Turkey) Eskişehirspor (6th)	(Czech Republic) Mladá Boleslav (4th)	(Belarus) Shakhtyor Soligorsk (2nd)	(Finland) Inter Turku (2nd)
(Greece) Asteras Tripolis (6th)	(Austria) Admira Wacker Mödling (3rd)	(Poland) Legia Warsaw (CW)	(Republic of Ireland) Sligo Rovers (CW)
(Denmark) AGF (5th)	(Austria) Ried (CR)	(Poland) Ruch Chorzów (2nd)	(Hungary) Videoton (2nd)
(Belgium) Gent (P-W)	(Cyprus) APOEL (2nd)	(Slovakia) Spartak Trnava (2nd)	(Moldova) Milsami Orhei (CW)
(Romania) Rapid București (4th)	(Cyprus) Anorthosis Famagusta (4th)	(Slovakia) Slovan Bratislava (3rd)	(Lithuania) Žalgiris (CW)
(Scotland) St Johnstone (6th)	(Bulgaria) CSKA Sofia (2nd)	(Norway) Aalesund (CW)	(Latvia) Skonto (CW)
(Switzerland) Young Boys (3rd)	(Bulgaria) Levski Sofia (3rd)	(Norway) Tromsø (2nd)	(Georgia (country)) Dila Gori (CW)
(Switzerland) Servette (4th)	(Bulgaria) Lokomotiv Plovdiv (CR)	(Serbia) Red Star Belgrade (CW)	
First qualifying round
(Croatia) Osijek (CR)	(Lithuania) Šiauliai (4th)	(Kazakhstan) Aktobe (3rd)	(Malta) Floriana (4th)
(Belarus) Gomel (3rd)	(Latvia) Liepājas Metalurgs (2nd)	(Liechtenstein) Eschen/Mauren (CW)	(Northern Ireland) Portadown (2nd)
(Poland) Lech Poznań (4th)	(Latvia) Daugava Daugavpils (3rd)	(Montenegro) Čelik Nikšić (CW)	(Northern Ireland) Cliftonville (3rd)
(Slovakia) Senica (CR)	(Georgia (country)) Metalurgi Rustavi (2nd)	(Montenegro) Rudar Pljevlja (2nd)	(Northern Ireland) Crusaders (CR)
(Norway) Rosenborg (3rd)	(Georgia (country)) Torpedo Kutaisi (3rd)	(Montenegro) Zeta (3rd)	(Faroe Islands) EB/Streymur (CW)
(Serbia) Jagodina (4th)	(Azerbaijan) Baku (CW)	(Albania) Tirana (CW)	(Faroe Islands) Víkingur Gøta (3rd)
(Sweden) IF Elfsborg (3rd)	(Azerbaijan) Khazar Lankaran (2nd)	(Albania) Teuta (2nd)	(Faroe Islands) NSÍ (4th)
(Sweden) Kalmar FF (CR)	(Azerbaijan) Inter Baku (3rd)	(Albania) Flamurtari (4th)	(Luxembourg) Jeunesse Esch (2nd)
(Bosnia and Herzegovina) Borac Banja Luka (3rd)	(Slovenia) Olimpija Ljubljana (2nd)	(Estonia) Levadia Tallinn (CW)	(Luxembourg) Grevenmacher (3rd)
(Bosnia and Herzegovina) Sarajevo (4th)	(Slovenia) Mura 05 (3rd)	(Estonia) Nõmme Kalju (2nd)	(Luxembourg) Differdange 03 (4th)
(Finland) JJK (3rd)	(Slovenia) Celje (CR)	(Estonia) Narva Trans (3rd)	(Andorra) FC Santa Coloma (CW)
(Finland) KuPS (CR)	(North Macedonia) Renova (CW)	(Wales) Bangor City (2nd)	(Andorra) UE Santa Coloma (3rd)
(Republic of Ireland) St Patrick's Athletic (4th)	(North Macedonia) Metalurg Skopje (2nd)	(Wales) Llanelli (P-W)	(San Marino) La Fiorita (CW)
(Republic of Ireland) Bohemians (5th)	(North Macedonia) Shkëndija (3rd)	(Wales) Cefn Druids (CR)	(San Marino) Libertas (2nd)
(Hungary) Honvéd (4th)	(Iceland) FH (2nd)	(Armenia) Shirak (CW)	(Norway) Stabæk (FP)
(Hungary) MTK Budapest (CR)	(Iceland) ÍBV (3rd)	(Armenia) Gandzasar Kapan (2nd)	(Finland) MYPA (FP)
(Moldova) Dacia Chișinău (2nd)	(Iceland) Þór (CR)	(Armenia) Pyunik (3rd)	(Netherlands) Twente (FP)
(Moldova) Zimbru Chișinău (3rd)	(Kazakhstan) Ordabasy (CW)	(Malta) Hibernians (CW)	
(Lithuania) Sūduva (3rd)	(Kazakhstan) Zhetysu (2nd)	(Malta) Birkirkara (3rd)	

Notes

1. Czech Republic (CZE): Sigma Olomouc, the 2011–12 Czech Cup winner, were initially to enter the third qualifying round of the Europa League. However, UEFA banned them from participating in Europa League over the club's involvement in a corruption scandal. As a result, Sparta Prague, the second-placed team of the 2011–12 Gambrinus liga, entered the Europa League third qualifying round instead of the second qualifying round, and Mladá Boleslav, the fourth-placed team of the league, took one of Czech Republic's Europa League places in the second qualifying round.
2. England (ENG): Tottenham Hotspur, the fourth-placed team of the 2011–12 Premier League, were initially to enter the 2012–13 UEFA Champions League. However, as Chelsea, the sixth-placed team of the league (who would have entered the Europa League at the group stage as winners of the 2011–12 FA Cup), won the 2011–12 UEFA Champions League, they automatically qualified for the following year's competition as title holders, and because of the restriction that no association can have more than four teams playing in the Champions League, Tottenham Hotspur instead entered the 2012–13 UEFA Europa League group stage.
3. Greece (GRE): AEK Athens, the third-placed team of the 2011–12 Super League Greece, could not get a UEFA licence to compete in the 2012–13 UEFA Europa League due to financial problems. As a result, Atromitos and PAOK, the fourth and fifth-placed teams of the league, entered the Europa League play-off round and third qualifying round instead of the third and second qualifying rounds respectively, and Asteras Tripolis, the sixth-placed team of the league, took Greece's Europa League place in the second qualifying round.
4. Hungary (HUN): Győri ETO finished third in the 2011–12 Hungarian National Championship I, but they were not eligible to enter the 2012–13 UEFA Europa League, due to having been suspended from participating in UEFA competitions (for the first season they qualify between the 2011–12 and 2013–14 seasons), in relation to club licensing violations. As a result, Honvéd, the fourth-placed team of the league, took one of Hungary's Europa League places in the first qualifying round.
5. Republic of Ireland (IRL): Because Derry City, the third-placed team of the 2012 League of Ireland Premier Division, went into liquidation two years ago, which led to a European ban for three years (and were thus refused entry to the 2012–13 European competitions by UEFA), Bohemians, the fifth-placed team of the league, claimed the Europa League spot in the first qualifying round.
6. Scotland (SCO): As a result of second-placed Rangers' administration and eventual liquidation, Motherwell, the third-placed team of the 2011–12 Scottish Premier League, took Scotland's Champions League place in the non-champions path, instead of entering the Europa League third qualifying round, and consequently, Dundee United, the fourth-placed team of the league, entered the Europa League third qualifying round, instead of the second qualifying round, and St Johnstone, the sixth-placed team of the league, took Scotland's Europa League place in the second qualifying round (as the fifth-placed team, Heart of Midlothian, already qualified for the Europa League as winners of the 2011–12 Scottish Cup).
7. Turkey (TUR): Beşiktaş, the fourth-placed team of the 2011–12 Süper Lig, have been banned by UEFA from competing in the 2012–13 UEFA Europa League, due to financial problems. As a result, Bursaspor, the fifth-placed team of the league (as well as the runners-up of the 2011–12 Turkish Cup), entered the Europa League third qualifying round, instead of the second qualifying round, and Eskişehirspor, the sixth-placed team of the league, took Turkey's Europa League place in the second qualifying round. Bursaspor were also initially banned from entering the Europa League, but this was overturned by the Court of Arbitration for Sport.
8. Wales (WAL): Neath, the third-placed team of the 2011–12 Welsh Premier League, has been refused the UEFA licence by the Licence Appeal body and was ineligible to participate in the end-of-season UEFA Europa League play-offs that were won by Llanelli.

== Round and draw dates ==
All draws are held at UEFA headquarters in Nyon, Switzerland unless stated otherwise.

Phase	Round	Draw date	First leg	Second leg
Qualifying	First qualifying round	25 June 2012	5 July 2012	12 July 2012
Qualifying	Second qualifying round	25 June 2012	19 July 2012	26 July 2012
Qualifying	Third qualifying round	20 July 2012	2 August 2012	9 August 2012
Play-off	Play-off round	10 August 2012	23 August 2012	30 August 2012
Group stage	Matchday 1	31 August 2012 (Monaco)	20 September 2012	
Group stage	Matchday 2	31 August 2012 (Monaco)	4 October 2012	
Group stage	Matchday 3	31 August 2012 (Monaco)	25 October 2012	
Group stage	Matchday 4	31 August 2012 (Monaco)	8 November 2012	
Group stage	Matchday 5	31 August 2012 (Monaco)	22 November 2012	
Group stage	Matchday 6	31 August 2012 (Monaco)	6 December 2012	
Knockout phase	Round of 32	20 December 2012	14 February 2013	21 February 2013
Knockout phase	Round of 16	20 December 2012	7 March 2013	14 March 2013
Knockout phase	Quarter-finals	15 March 2013	4 April 2013	11 April 2013
Knockout phase	Semi-finals	12 April 2013	25 April 2013	2 May 2013
Knockout phase	Final	12 April 2013	15 May 2013 at Amsterdam Arena, Amsterdam	

Matches in the qualifying, play-off, and knockout rounds may also be played on Tuesdays or Wednesdays instead of the regular Thursdays due to scheduling conflicts.

== Qualifying rounds ==
In the qualifying rounds and the play-off round, teams were divided into seeded and unseeded teams based on their 2012 UEFA club coefficients, and then drawn into two-legged home-and-away ties. Teams from the same association could not be drawn against each other.

=== First qualifying round ===
The draw for the first qualifying round was held on 25 June 2012. The first legs were played on 3 and 5 July, and the second legs were played on 10 and 12 July 2012.

Team 1	Agg.	Team 2	1st leg	2nd leg
Narva Trans (Estonia)	0–7 (Note: Order of legs reversed after original draw)	(Azerbaijan) Inter Baku	0–5	0–2
MTK Budapest (Hungary)	2–3	(Slovakia) Senica	1–1	1–2
Tirana (Albania)	2–0	(Luxembourg) Grevenmacher	2–0	0–0
Torpedo Kutaisi (Georgia (country))	1–2	(Kazakhstan) Aktobe	1–1	0–1
Borac Banja Luka (Bosnia and Herzegovina)	3–3 (a)	(Montenegro) Čelik Nikšić	2–2	1–1
Baku (Azerbaijan)	0–2	(Slovenia) Mura 05	0–0	0–2
IF Elfsborg (Sweden)	12–0	(Malta) Floriana	8–0	4–0
Renova (North Macedonia)	8–0	(San Marino) Libertas	4–0	4–0
FC Santa Coloma (Andorra)	1–4	(Croatia) Osijek	0–1	1–3
Jagodina (Serbia)	0–1	(Kazakhstan) Ordabasy	0–1	0–0
Differdange 03 (Luxembourg)	6–0	(Faroe Islands) NSÍ	3–0	3–0
Crusaders (Northern Ireland)	0–4	(Norway) Rosenborg	0–3	0–1
Cefn Druids (Wales)	0–5	(Finland) MYPA	0–0	0–5
Levadia Tallinn (Estonia)	2–2 (a)	(Lithuania) Šiauliai	1–0	1–2
Bohemians (Republic of Ireland)	1–5	(Iceland) Þór	0–0	1–5
Sarajevo (Bosnia and Herzegovina)	9–6	(Malta) Hibernians	5–2	4–4
Twente (Netherlands)	9–0	(Andorra) UE Santa Coloma	6–0	3–0
Rudar Pljevlja (Montenegro)	1–2	(Armenia) Shirak	0–1	1–1
Flamurtari (Albania)	0–3	(Hungary) Honvéd	0–1	0–2
Dacia Chișinău (Moldova)	2–0	(Slovenia) Celje	1–0	1–0
Sūduva (Lithuania)	3–3 (a)	(Latvia) Daugava Daugavpils	0–1	3–2
KuPS (Finland)	3–2	(Wales) Llanelli	2–1	1–1
Cliftonville (Northern Ireland)	1–4	(Sweden) Kalmar FF	1–0	0–4
Víkingur Gøta (Faroe Islands)	0–10	(Belarus) Gomel	0–6	0–4
FH (Iceland)	3–1	(Liechtenstein) Eschen/Mauren	2–1	1–0
Lech Poznań (Poland)	3–1	(Kazakhstan) Zhetysu	2–0	1–1
Khazar Lankaran (Azerbaijan)	4–2	(Estonia) Nõmme Kalju	2–2	2–0
Birkirkara (Malta)	2–2 (a)	(North Macedonia) Metalurg Skopje	2–2	0–0
Pyunik (Armenia)	2–4	(Montenegro) Zeta	0–3	2–1
Teuta (Albania)	1–9	(Georgia (country)) Metalurgi Rustavi	0–3	1–6
Olimpija Ljubljana (Slovenia)	6–0	(Luxembourg) Jeunesse Esch	3–0	3–0
EB/Streymur (Faroe Islands)	3–3 (a)	(Armenia) Gandzasar Kapan	3–1	0–2
St Patrick's Athletic (Republic of Ireland)	2–2 (a)	(Iceland) ÍBV	1–0	1–2 (a.e.t.)
La Fiorita (San Marino)	0–6	(Latvia) Liepājas Metalurgs	0–2	0–4
JJK (Finland)	4–3	(Norway) Stabæk	2–0	2–3
Bangor City (Wales)	1–2	(Moldova) Zimbru Chișinău	0–0	1–2
Shkëndija (North Macedonia)	1–2	(Northern Ireland) Portadown	0–0	1–2

=== Second qualifying round ===
The draw for the second qualifying round was held on 25 June 2012, immediately after the first qualifying round draw. The first legs were played on 19 July, and the second legs were played on 26 July 2012.

Team 1	Agg.	Team 2	1st leg	2nd leg
Khazar Lankaran (Azerbaijan)	1–2	(Poland) Lech Poznań	1–1	0–1
Eskişehirspor (Turkey)	3–1	(Scotland) St Johnstone	2–0	1–1
Hajduk Split (Croatia)	2–1	(Latvia) Skonto	2–0	0–1
AIK (Sweden)	2–1	(Iceland) FH	1–1	1–0
Renova (North Macedonia)	1–2	(Belarus) Gomel	0–2	1–0
Naftan Novopolotsk (Belarus)	6–7	(Serbia) Red Star Belgrade	3–4	3–3
Vojvodina (Serbia)	5–1	(Lithuania) Sūduva	1–1	4–0
JJK (Finland)	3–3 (a)	(Montenegro) Zeta	3–2	0–1
Young Boys (Switzerland)	1–1 (4–1 p)	(Moldova) Zimbru Chișinău	1–0	0–1 (a.e.t.)
Lokomotiv Plovdiv (Bulgaria)	5–7	(Netherlands) Vitesse	4–4	1–3
Tirana (Albania)	1–6	(Norway) Aalesund	1–1	0–5
Metalurh Donetsk (Ukraine)	11–2	(Montenegro) Čelik Nikšić	7–0	4–2
Maccabi Netanya (Israel)	2–2 (a)	(Finland) KuPS	1–2	1–0
Mladá Boleslav (Czech Republic)	4–0	(Iceland) Þór	3–0	1–0
Levadia Tallinn (Estonia)	1–6	(Cyprus) Anorthosis Famagusta	1–3	0–3
Milsami Orhei (Moldova)	4–5	(Kazakhstan) Aktobe	4–2	0–3
Slaven Belupo (Croatia)	10–2	(Northern Ireland) Portadown	6–0	4–2
Servette (Switzerland)	5–1	(Armenia) Gandzasar Kapan	2–0	3–1
Twente (Netherlands)	6–1	(Finland) Inter Turku	1–1	5–0
Žalgiris (Lithuania)	2–6	(Austria) Admira Wacker Mödling	1–1	1–5
Osijek (Croatia)	1–6	(Sweden) Kalmar FF	1–3	0–3
Slovan Bratislava (Slovakia)	1–1 (a)	(Hungary) Videoton	1–1	0–0
Rapid București (Romania)	5–1	(Finland) MYPA	3–1	2–0
Metalurgi Rustavi (Georgia (country))	1–5 (Note: Order of legs reversed after original draw)	(Czech Republic) Viktoria Plzeň	1–3	0–2
Mura 05 (Slovenia)	1–1 (a)	(Bulgaria) CSKA Sofia	0–0	1–1
Inter Baku (Azerbaijan)	2–2 (2–4 p)	(Greece) Asteras Tripolis	1–1	1–1 (a.e.t.)
Differdange 03 (Luxembourg)	2–4	(Belgium) Gent	0–1	2–3
Anzhi Makhachkala (Russia)	5–0	(Hungary) Honvéd	1–0	4–0
Levski Sofia (Bulgaria)	2–3	(Bosnia and Herzegovina) Sarajevo	1–0	1–3
Liepājas Metalurgs (Latvia)	3–7	(Poland) Legia Warsaw	2–2	1–5
Shakhtyor Soligorsk (Belarus)	1–1 (a)	(Austria) Ried	1–1	0–0
Bnei Yehuda (Israel)	3–0	(Armenia) Shirak	2–0	1–0
Rosenborg (Norway)	4–3	(Kazakhstan) Ordabasy	2–2	2–1
Spartak Trnava (Slovakia)	4–2	(Republic of Ireland) Sligo Rovers	3–1	1–1
Dacia Chișinău (Moldova)	1–2	(Sweden) IF Elfsborg	1–0	0–2
Široki Brijeg (Bosnia and Herzegovina)	2–3	(Republic of Ireland) St Patrick's Athletic	1–1	1–2 (a.e.t.)
APOEL (Cyprus)	3–0	(Slovakia) Senica	2–0	1–0
Ruch Chorzów (Poland)	6–1	(North Macedonia) Metalurg Skopje	3–1	3–0
AGF (Denmark)	2–5	(Georgia (country)) Dila Gori	1–2	1–3
Olimpija Ljubljana (Slovenia)	0–1	(Norway) Tromsø	0–0	0–1 (a.e.t.)

=== Third qualifying round ===
The draw for the third qualifying rounds was held on 20 July 2012. The first legs were played on 2 August, and the second legs were played on 9 August 2012.

Team 1	Agg.	Team 2	1st leg	2nd leg
Videoton (Hungary)	4–0	(Belgium) Gent	1–0	3–0
AIK (Sweden)	3–1	(Poland) Lech Poznań	3–0	0–1
Eskişehirspor (Turkey)	1–4	(France) Marseille	1–1	0–3
Red Star Belgrade (Serbia)	0–0 (6–5 p)	(Cyprus) Omonia	0–0	0–0 (a.e.t.)
Sarajevo (Bosnia and Herzegovina)	2–2 (a)	(Montenegro) Zeta	2–1	0–1
Admira Wacker Mödling (Austria)	2–4	(Czech Republic) Sparta Prague	0–2	2–2
Kalmar FF (Sweden)	1–3	(Switzerland) Young Boys	1–0	0–3
Dundee United (Scotland)	2–7	(Russia) Dynamo Moscow	2–2	0–5
Arsenal Kyiv (Ukraine)	2–3	(Slovenia) Mura 05	0–3 (Note: UEFA awarded Mura 05 a 3–0 win due to Arsenal Kyiv fielding suspended player Éric Matoukou in the first leg. The original match had ended in a 3–0 win for Arsenal Kyiv.)	2–0
KuPS (Finland)	1–6 (Note: Order of legs reversed after original draw.)	(Turkey) Bursaspor	1–0	0–6
Steaua București (Romania)	3–1	(Slovakia) Spartak Trnava	0–1	3–0
Gomel (Belarus)	0–4	(England) Liverpool	0–1	0–3
Ried (Austria)	3–4	(Poland) Legia Warsaw	2–1	1–3
St Patrick's Athletic (Republic of Ireland)	0–5	(Germany) Hannover 96	0–3	0–2
Servette (Switzerland)	1–1 (a)	(Norway) Rosenborg	1–1	0–0
Athletic Bilbao (Spain)	4–3	(Croatia) Slaven Belupo	3–1	1–2
Anzhi Makhachkala (Russia)	4–0	(Netherlands) Vitesse	2–0	2–0
Asteras Tripolis (Greece)	1–1 (a)	(Portugal) Marítimo	1–1	0–0
Heerenveen (Netherlands)	4–1	(Romania) Rapid București	4–0	0–1
Ruch Chorzów (Poland)	0–7	(Czech Republic) Viktoria Plzeň	0–2	0–5
Horsens (Denmark)	4–3	(Sweden) IF Elfsborg	1–1	3–2
APOEL (Cyprus)	3–1	(Norway) Aalesund	2–1	1–0
Hajduk Split (Croatia)	2–3	(Italy) Internazionale	0–3	2–0
Vojvodina (Serbia)	2–3	(Austria) Rapid Wien	2–1	0–2
Genk (Belgium)	4–2	(Kazakhstan) Aktobe	2–1	2–1
Tromsø (Norway)	2–1	(Ukraine) Metalurh Donetsk	1–1	1–0
Twente (Netherlands)	4–0	(Czech Republic) Mladá Boleslav	2–0	2–0
Bnei Yehuda (Israel)	1–6	(Greece) PAOK	0–2	1–4
Dila Gori (Georgia (country))	3–1	(Cyprus) Anorthosis Famagusta	0–1	3–0 (Note: The match was abandoned in the 82nd minute due to crowd disturbance. Dila Gori was leading 3–0. That result was confirmed standing by UEFA.)

== Play-off round ==
The draw for the play-off round was held on 10 August 2012. The first legs were played on 22 and 23 August, and the second legs were played on 28 and 30 August 2012.

Team 1	Agg.	Team 2	1st leg	2nd leg
Anzhi Makhachkala (Russia)	6–0	(Netherlands) AZ	1–0	5–0
Neftçi (Azerbaijan)	4–2 (Note: Order of legs reversed after original draw)	(Cyprus) APOEL	1–1	3–1
Atromitos (Greece)	1–2	(England) Newcastle United	1–1	0–1
Tromsø (Norway)	3–3 (a)	(Serbia) Partizan	3–2	0–1
Vaslui (Romania)	2–4	(Italy) Internazionale	0–2	2–2
Heart of Midlothian (Scotland)	1–2	(England) Liverpool	0–1	1–1
Athletic Bilbao (Spain)	9–3	(Finland) HJK	6–0	3–3
Marítimo (Portugal)	3–0	(Georgia (country)) Dila Gori	1–0	2–0
Molde (Norway)	4–1	(Netherlands) Heerenveen	2–0	2–1
Debrecen (Hungary)	1–7	(Belgium) Club Brugge	0–3	1–4
Sheriff Tiraspol (Moldova)	1–2	(France) Marseille	1–2	0–0
Trabzonspor (Turkey)	0–0 (2–4 p)	(Hungary) Videoton	0–0	0–0 (a.e.t.)
Midtjylland (Denmark)	2–3	(Switzerland) Young Boys	0–3	2–0
Śląsk Wrocław (Poland)	4–10	(Germany) Hannover 96	3–5	1–5
Dinamo București (Romania)	1–4	(Ukraine) Metalist Kharkiv	0–2	1–2
Horsens (Denmark)	1–6	(Portugal) Sporting CP	1–1	0–5
F91 Dudelange (Luxembourg)	1–7	(Israel) Hapoel Tel Aviv	1–3	0–4
Feyenoord (Netherlands)	2–4	(Czech Republic) Sparta Prague	2–2	0–2
Motherwell (Scotland)	0–3	(Spain) Levante	0–2	0–1
Red Star Belgrade (Serbia)	2–3	(France) Bordeaux	0–0	2–3
Lokeren (Belgium)	2–2 (a)	(Czech Republic) Viktoria Plzeň	2–1	0–1
Mura 05 (Slovenia)	1–5	(Italy) Lazio	0–2	1–3
AIK (Sweden)	2–1	(Russia) CSKA Moscow	0–1	2–0
Legia Warsaw (Poland)	2–3	(Norway) Rosenborg	1–1	1–2
Bursaspor (Turkey)	4–5	(Netherlands) Twente	3–1	1–4 (a.e.t.)
Ekranas (Lithuania)	0–5	(Romania) Steaua București	0–2	0–3
Slovan Liberec (Czech Republic)	4–6	(Ukraine) Dnipro Dnipropetrovsk	2–2	2–4
VfB Stuttgart (Germany)	3–1	(Russia) Dynamo Moscow	2–0	1–1
PAOK (Greece)	2–4	(Austria) Rapid Wien	2–1	0–3
Luzern (Switzerland)	2–3	(Belgium) Genk	2–1	0–2
Zeta (Montenegro)	0–14	(Netherlands) PSV Eindhoven	0–5	0–9

== Group stage ==
Location of teams of the 2012–13 UEFA Europa League group stage.
Red: Group A; Yellow: Group B; Green: Group C; Dark green: Group D;
Purple: Group E; Pink: Group F; Blue: Group G; Orange: Group H;
Brown: Group I; Deep pink: Group J; Cyan: Group K; Spring green: Group L.

The draw for the group stage was held in Monaco on 31 August 2012. The 48 teams were allocated into four pots based on their 2012 UEFA club coefficients, with the title holders, Atlético Madrid, being placed in Pot 1 automatically. They were drawn into twelve groups of four, with the restriction that teams from the same association could not be drawn against each other.

In each group, teams played against each other home-and-away in a round-robin format. The matchdays were 20 September, 4 October, 25 October, 8 November, 22 November, and 6 December 2012. The group winners and runners-up advanced to the round of 32, where they were joined by the eight third-placed teams from the 2012–13 UEFA Champions League group stage.

A total of 25 national associations were represented in the group stage. This was the first time a team from Azerbaijan qualified for the group stage of a UEFA competition. AEL, Anzhi, Kiryat Shmona, Levante, Marítimo, Neftçi and Videoton all appeared in the group stage of a UEFA competition for the first time.

=== Group A ===
Pos	Team	Pld	W	D	L	GF	GA	GD	Pts	Qualification	LIV	ANZ	YB	UDI
1	(England) Liverpool	6	3	1	2	11	9	+2	10 (Note: Head-to-head points: Liverpool 7, Anzhi Makhachkala 6, Young Boys 4.)	Advance to knockout phase	—	1–0	2–2	2–3
2	(Russia) Anzhi Makhachkala	6	3	1	2	7	5	+2	10	Advance to knockout phase	1–0	—	2–0	2–0
3	(Switzerland) Young Boys	6	3	1	2	14	13	+1	10		3–5	3–1	—	3–1
4	(Italy) Udinese	6	1	1	4	7	12	−5	4		0–1	1–1	2–3	—

Source: Soccerway

=== Group B ===
Pos	Team	Pld	W	D	L	GF	GA	GD	Pts	Qualification	PLZ	ATL	ACA	HTA
1	(Czech Republic) Viktoria Plzeň	6	4	1	1	11	4	+7	13	Advance to knockout phase	—	1–0	3–1	4–0
2	(Spain) Atlético Madrid	6	4	0	2	7	4	+3	12	Advance to knockout phase	1–0	—	2–1	1–0
3	(Portugal) Académica	6	1	2	3	6	9	−3	5		1–1	2–0	—	1–1
4	(Israel) Hapoel Tel Aviv	6	1	1	4	4	11	−7	4		1–2	0–3	2–0	—

Source: Soccerway

=== Group C ===
Pos	Team	Pld	W	D	L	GF	GA	GD	Pts	Qualification	FEN	MGB	OM	AEL
1	(Turkey) Fenerbahçe	6	4	1	1	10	7	+3	13	Advance to knockout phase	—	0–3	2–2	2–0
2	(Germany) Borussia Mönchengladbach	6	3	2	1	11	6	+5	11	Advance to knockout phase	2–4	—	2–0	2–0
3	(France) Marseille	6	1	2	3	9	11	−2	5		0–1	2–2	—	5–1
4	(Cyprus) AEL Limassol	6	1	1	4	4	10	−6	4		0–1	0–0	3–0	—

Source: Soccerway

=== Group D ===
Pos	Team	Pld	W	D	L	GF	GA	GD	Pts	Qualification	BOR	NEW	MTM	BRU
1	(France) Bordeaux	6	4	1	1	10	5	+5	13	Advance to knockout phase	—	2–0	1–0	4–0
2	(England) Newcastle United	6	2	3	1	7	5	+2	9	Advance to knockout phase	3–0	—	1–1	1–0
3	(Portugal) Marítimo	6	1	3	2	4	6	−2	6		1–1	0–0	—	2–1
4	(Belgium) Club Brugge	6	1	1	4	6	11	−5	4		1–2	2–2	2–0	—

Source: Soccerway

=== Group E ===
Pos	Team	Pld	W	D	L	GF	GA	GD	Pts	Qualification	STE	STU	COP	MOL
1	(Romania) Steaua București	6	3	2	1	9	9	0	11	Advance to knockout phase	—	1–5	1–0	2–0
2	(Germany) VfB Stuttgart	6	2	2	2	9	6	+3	8 (Note: Head-to-head points: VfB Stuttgart 4, Copenhagen 1.)	Advance to knockout phase	2–2	—	0–0	0–1
3	(Denmark) Copenhagen	6	2	2	2	5	6	−1	8		1–1	0–2	—	2–1
4	(Norway) Molde	6	2	0	4	6	8	−2	6		1–2	2–0	1–2	—

Source: Soccerway

=== Group F ===
Pos	Team	Pld	W	D	L	GF	GA	GD	Pts	Qualification	DNI	NAP	PSV	AIK
1	(Ukraine) Dnipro Dnipropetrovsk	6	5	0	1	16	8	+8	15	Advance to knockout phase	—	3–1	2–0	4–0
2	(Italy) Napoli	6	3	0	3	12	12	0	9	Advance to knockout phase	4–2	—	1–3	4–0
3	(Netherlands) PSV Eindhoven	6	2	1	3	8	7	+1	7		1–2	3–0	—	1–1
4	(Sweden) AIK	6	1	1	4	5	14	−9	4		2–3	1–2	1–0	—

Source: Soccerway

=== Group G ===
Pos	Team	Pld	W	D	L	GF	GA	GD	Pts	Qualification	GNK	BSL	VID	SPO
1	(Belgium) Genk	6	3	3	0	9	4	+5	12	Advance to knockout phase	—	0–0	3–0	2–1
2	(Switzerland) Basel	6	2	3	1	7	4	+3	9	Advance to knockout phase	2–2	—	1–0	3–0
3	(Hungary) Videoton	6	2	0	4	6	8	−2	6		0–1	2–1	—	3–0
4	(Portugal) Sporting CP	6	1	2	3	4	10	−6	5		1–1	0–0	2–1	—

Source: Soccerway

=== Group H ===
Pos	Team	Pld	W	D	L	GF	GA	GD	Pts	Qualification	RUB	INT	PAR	NEF
1	(Russia) Rubin Kazan	6	4	2	0	10	3	+7	14	Advance to knockout phase	—	3–0	2–0	1–0
2	(Italy) Internazionale	6	3	2	1	11	9	+2	11	Advance to knockout phase	2–2	—	1–0	2–2
3	(Serbia) Partizan	6	0	3	3	3	8	−5	3 (Note: Tied on head-to-head points (2) and head-to-head goal difference (0). Head-to-head away goals: Partizan 1, Neftçi 0.)		1–1	1–3	—	0–0
4	(Azerbaijan) Neftçi	6	0	3	3	4	8	−4	3		0–1	1–3	1–1	—

Source: Soccerway

=== Group I ===
Pos	Team	Pld	W	D	L	GF	GA	GD	Pts	Qualification	OL	SPR	ATH	IKS
1	(France) Lyon	6	5	1	0	14	8	+6	16	Advance to knockout phase	—	2–1	2–1	2–0
2	(Czech Republic) Sparta Prague	6	2	3	1	9	6	+3	9	Advance to knockout phase	1–1	—	3–1	3–1
3	(Spain) Athletic Bilbao	6	1	2	3	7	9	−2	5		2–3	0–0	—	1–1
4	(Israel) Ironi Kiryat Shmona	6	0	2	4	6	13	−7	2		3–4	1–1	0–2	—

Source: Soccerway

=== Group J ===
Pos	Team	Pld	W	D	L	GF	GA	GD	Pts	Qualification	LAZ	TOT	PAN	MRB
1	(Italy) Lazio	6	3	3	0	9	2	+7	12	Advance to knockout phase	—	0–0	3–0	1–0
2	(England) Tottenham Hotspur	6	2	4	0	8	4	+4	10	Advance to knockout phase	0–0	—	3–1	3–1
3	(Greece) Panathinaikos	6	1	2	3	4	11	−7	5		1–1	1–1	—	1–0
4	(Slovenia) Maribor	6	1	1	4	6	10	−4	4		1–4	1–1	3–0	—

Source: Soccerway

=== Group K ===
Pos	Team	Pld	W	D	L	GF	GA	GD	Pts	Qualification	MET	BAY	ROS	RAP
1	(Ukraine) Metalist Kharkiv	6	4	1	1	9	3	+6	13 (Note: Head-to-head points: Metalist Kharkiv 4, Bayer Leverkusen 1.)	Advance to knockout phase	—	2–0	3–1	2–0
2	(Germany) Bayer Leverkusen	6	4	1	1	9	2	+7	13	Advance to knockout phase	0–0	—	1–0	3–0
3	(Norway) Rosenborg	6	2	0	4	7	10	−3	6		1–2	0–1	—	3–2
4	(Austria) Rapid Wien	6	1	0	5	4	14	−10	3		1–0	0–4	1–2	—

Source: Soccerway

=== Group L ===
Pos	Team	Pld	W	D	L	GF	GA	GD	Pts	Qualification	HAN	LEV	HEL	TWE
1	(Germany) Hannover 96	6	3	3	0	11	8	+3	12	Advance to knockout phase	—	2–1	3–2	0–0
2	(Spain) Levante	6	3	2	1	10	5	+5	11	Advance to knockout phase	2–2	—	1–0	3–0
3	(Sweden) Helsingborgs IF	6	1	1	4	9	12	−3	4 (Note: Head-to-head points: Helsingborg 4, Twente 1.)		1–2	1–3	—	2–2
4	(Netherlands) Twente	6	0	4	2	5	10	−5	4		2–2	0–0	1–3	—

Source: Soccerway

== Knockout phase ==
In the knockout phase, teams played against each other over two legs on a home-and-away basis, except for the one-match final. The mechanism of the draws for each round is as follows:

- In the draw for the round of 32, the twelve group winners and the four third-placed teams from the Champions League group stage with the better group records were seeded, and the twelve group runners-up and the other four third-placed teams from the Champions League group stage were unseeded. The seeded teams were drawn against the unseeded teams, with the seeded teams hosting the second leg. Teams from the same group or the same association could not be drawn against each other.
- In the draws for the round of 16 onwards, there were no seedings, and teams from the same group or the same association could be drawn against each other.

=== Bracket ===
Round of 32
(Italy) Napoli	0	0	0
(Czech Republic) Viktoria Plzeň	3	2	5
(Belarus) BATE Borisov	0	0	0
(Turkey) Fenerbahçe	0	1	1
(Germany) VfB Stuttgart	1	2	3
(Belgium) Genk	1	0	1
(Germany) Borussia Mönchengladbach	3	0	3
(Italy) Lazio	3	2	5
(Germany) Bayer Leverkusen	0	1	1
(Portugal) Benfica	1	2	3
(Ukraine) Dynamo Kyiv	1	0	1
(France) Bordeaux	1	1	2
(Russia) Anzhi Makhachkala	3	1	4
(Germany) Hannover 96	1	1	2
(England) Newcastle United	0	1	1
(Ukraine) Metalist Kharkiv	0	0	0
(England) Tottenham Hotspur	2	1	3
(France) Lyon	1	1	2
(Italy) Internazionale	2	3	5
(Romania) CFR Cluj	0	0	0
(Switzerland) Basel	2	1	3
(Ukraine) Dnipro Dnipropetrovsk	0	1	1
(Russia) Zenit Saint Petersburg (a)	2	1	3
(England) Liverpool	0	3	3
(Netherlands) Ajax	2	0	2 (2)
(Romania) Steaua București (p)	0	2	2 (4)
(Czech Republic) Sparta Prague	0	1	1
(England) Chelsea	1	1	2
(Spain) Levante	3	1	4
(Greece) Olympiacos	0	0	0
(Spain) Atlético Madrid	0	1	1
(Russia) Rubin Kazan	2	0	2

Round of 16
(Czech Republic) Viktoria Plzeň	0	1	1
(Turkey) Fenerbahçe	1	1	2
(Germany) VfB Stuttgart	0	1	1
(Italy) Lazio	2	3	5
(Portugal) Benfica	1	3	4
(France) Bordeaux	0	2	2
(Russia) Anzhi Makhachkala	0	0	0
(England) Newcastle United	0	1	1
(England) Tottenham Hotspur (a.e.t.; a)	3	1	4
(Italy) Internazionale	0	4	4
(Switzerland) Basel	2	0	2
(Russia) Zenit Saint Petersburg	0	1	1
(Romania) Steaua București	1	1	2
(England) Chelsea	0	3	3
(Spain) Levante	0	0	0
(Russia) Rubin Kazan (a.e.t.)	0	2	2

Quarter-finals
(Turkey) Fenerbahçe	2	1	3
(Italy) Lazio	0	1	1
(Portugal) Benfica	3	1	4
(England) Newcastle United	1	1	2
(England) Tottenham Hotspur	2	2	4 (1)
(Switzerland) Basel (p)	2	2	4 (4)
(England) Chelsea	3	2	5
(Russia) Rubin Kazan	1	3	4

Semi-finals
(Turkey) Fenerbahçe	1	1	2
(Portugal) Benfica	0	3	3
(Switzerland) Basel	1	1	2
(England) Chelsea	2	3	5

Final
15 May – Amsterdam
(Portugal) Benfica	1
(England) Chelsea	2

=== Round of 32 ===
The draw for the round of 32 was held on 20 December 2012. The first legs were played on 14 February, and the second legs were played on 21 February 2013.

Team 1	Agg.	Team 2	1st leg	2nd leg
BATE Borisov (Belarus)	0–1	(Turkey) Fenerbahçe	0–0	0–1
Internazionale (Italy)	5–0	(Romania) CFR Cluj	2–0	3–0
Levante (Spain)	4–0	(Greece) Olympiacos	3–0	1–0
Zenit Saint Petersburg (Russia)	3–3 (a)	(England) Liverpool	2–0	1–3
Dynamo Kyiv (Ukraine)	1–2	(France) Bordeaux	1–1	0–1
Bayer Leverkusen (Germany)	1–3	(Portugal) Benfica	0–1	1–2
Newcastle United (England)	1–0	(Ukraine) Metalist Kharkiv	0–0	1–0
VfB Stuttgart (Germany)	3–1	(Belgium) Genk	1–1	2–0
Atlético Madrid (Spain)	1–2	(Russia) Rubin Kazan	0–2	1–0
Ajax (Netherlands)	2–2 (2–4 p)	(Romania) Steaua București	2–0	0–2 (a.e.t.)
Basel (Switzerland)	3–1	(Ukraine) Dnipro Dnipropetrovsk	2–0	1–1
Anzhi Makhachkala (Russia)	4–2	(Germany) Hannover 96	3–1	1–1
Sparta Prague (Czech Republic)	1–2	(England) Chelsea	0–1	1–1
Borussia Mönchengladbach (Germany)	3–5	(Italy) Lazio	3–3	0–2
Tottenham Hotspur (England)	3–2	(France) Lyon	2–1	1–1
Napoli (Italy)	0–5	(Czech Republic) Viktoria Plzeň	0–3	0–2

=== Round of 16 ===
The draw for the round of 16 was held on 20 December 2012, immediately after the round of 32 draw. The first legs were played on 7 March, and the second legs were played on 14 March 2013.

Team 1	Agg.	Team 2	1st leg	2nd leg
Viktoria Plzeň (Czech Republic)	1–2	(Turkey) Fenerbahçe	0–1	1–1
Benfica (Portugal)	4–2	(France) Bordeaux	1–0	3–2
Anzhi Makhachkala (Russia)	0–1	(England) Newcastle United	0–0	0–1
VfB Stuttgart (Germany)	1–5	(Italy) Lazio	0–2	1–3
Tottenham Hotspur (England)	4–4 (a)	(Italy) Internazionale	3–0	1–4 (a.e.t.)
Levante (Spain)	0–2	(Russia) Rubin Kazan	0–0	0–2 (a.e.t.)
Basel (Switzerland)	2–1	(Russia) Zenit Saint Petersburg	2–0	0–1
Steaua București (Romania)	2–3	(England) Chelsea	1–0	1–3

=== Quarter-finals ===
The draw for the quarter-finals was held on 15 March 2013. The first legs were played on 4 April, and the second legs were played on 11 April 2013.

Team 1	Agg.	Team 2	1st leg	2nd leg
Chelsea (England)	5–4	(Russia) Rubin Kazan	3–1	2–3
Tottenham Hotspur (England)	4–4 (1–4 p)	(Switzerland) Basel	2–2	2–2 (a.e.t.)
Fenerbahçe (Turkey)	3–1	(Italy) Lazio	2–0	1–1
Benfica (Portugal)	4–2	(England) Newcastle United	3–1	1–1

=== Semi-finals ===
The draw for the semi-finals was held on 12 April 2013. The first legs were played on 25 April, and the second legs were played on 2 May 2013.

Team 1	Agg.	Team 2	1st leg	2nd leg
Fenerbahçe (Turkey)	2–3	(Portugal) Benfica	1–0	1–3
Basel (Switzerland)	2–5	(England) Chelsea	1–2	1–3

=== Final ===
The final was played on 15 May 2013 at the Amsterdam Arena in Amsterdam, Netherlands. A draw was held on 12 April 2013, after the semi-final draw, to determine the "home" team for administrative purposes.

15 May 2013
20:45 UTC+2

Benfica (Portugal)	1–2	(England) Chelsea
Cardozo 68' (pen.)	Report	Torres 60'; Ivanović 90+3'

Amsterdam Arena, Amsterdam
Attendance: 46,163
Referee: Björn Kuipers (Netherlands)

== Statistics ==
Statistics exclude qualifying rounds and play-off round.

=== Top goalscorers ===
Rank	Player	Team	Goals	Minutes played
1	(Czech Republic) Libor Kozák	(Italy) Lazio	8	613
2	(Uruguay) Edinson Cavani	(Italy) Napoli	7	462
2	(Paraguay) Óscar Cardozo	(Portugal) Benfica	7	585
4	(Argentina) Rodrigo Palacio	(Italy) Internazionale	6	436
4	(Spain) Fernando Torres	(England) Chelsea	6	810
6	(Argentina) Raúl Bobadilla	(Switzerland) Young Boys	5	535
6	(Venezuela) Salomón Rondón	(Russia) Rubin Kazan	5	976
8	(Croatia) Marko Livaja	(Italy) Internazionale	4	416
8	(Nigeria) Victor Moses	(England) Chelsea	4	426
8	(England) Jonjo Shelvey	(England) Liverpool	4	481
8	(Mali) Cheick Diabaté	(France) Bordeaux	4	509
8	(Serbia) Nikola Đurđić	(Sweden) Helsingborgs IF	4	540
8	(Italy) Sergio Floccari	(Italy) Lazio	4	562
8	(England) Jermain Defoe	(England) Tottenham Hotspur	4	614
8	(Brazil) Cleiton Xavier	(Ukraine) Metalist Kharkiv	4	630
8	(Romania) Raul Rusescu	(Romania) Steaua București	4	661
8	(Senegal) Papiss Cissé	(England) Newcastle United	4	676
8	(Cameroon) Samuel Eto'o	(Russia) Anzhi Makhachkala	4	900
8	(Switzerland) Marco Streller	(Switzerland) Basel	4	949
8	(Turkey) Gökdeniz Karadeniz	(Russia) Rubin Kazan	4	1066
8	(Netherlands) Dirk Kuyt	(Turkey) Fenerbahçe	4	1105
8	(Switzerland) Fabian Schär	(Switzerland) Basel	4	1147

=== Top assists ===
Rank	Player	Team	Assists	Minutes played
1	(Spain) José Barkero	(Spain) Levante	6	477'
1	(Spain) Juan Mata	(England) Chelsea	6	491'
3	(Colombia) Fredy Guarín	(Italy) Internazionale	4	568'
3	(England) Frank Lampard	(England) Chelsea	4	619'
3	(Egypt) Mohamed Salah	(Switzerland) Basel	4	948'
6	(France) Clément Grenier	(France) Lyon	3	331'
6	(Czech Republic) Jan Kovařík	(Czech Republic) Viktoria Plzeň	3	360'
6	(Germany) Lars Stindl	(Germany) Hannover 96	3	398'
6	(Ivory Coast) Lacina Traoré	(Russia) Anzhi Makhachkala	3	411'
6	(Ukraine) Yevhen Seleznyov	(Ukraine) Dnipro Dnipropetrovsk	3	443'
6	(Turkey) Emre Belözoğlu	(Spain) Atlético Madrid	3	467'
6	(France) Julien Gorius	(Belgium) Genk	3	556'
6	(Italy) Antonio Cassano	(Italy) Internazionale	3	574'
6	(Hungary) Szabolcs Huszti	(Germany) Hannover 96	3	683'
6	(Morocco) Mbark Boussoufa	(Russia) Anzhi Makhachkala	3	696'
6	(England) Stewart Downing	(England) Liverpool	3	701'
6	(Italy) Antonio Candreva	(Italy) Lazio	3	705'
6	(Wales) Gareth Bale	(England) Tottenham Hotspur	3	716'
6	(Finland) Roman Eremenko	(Russia) Rubin Kazan	3	768'
6	(Romania) Ștefan Radu	(Italy) Lazio	3	776'
6	(Japan) Gōtoku Sakai	(Germany) VfB Stuttgart	3	784'
6	(Czech Republic) Radim Řezník	(Czech Republic) Viktoria Plzeň	3	900'
6	(Brazil) Hernanes	(Italy) Lazio	3	908'
6	(Israel) Bibras Natcho	(Russia) Rubin Kazan	3	1018'
6	(Brazil) Cristian	(Turkey) Fenerbahçe	3	1074'

== See also ==
- 2013 UEFA Super Cup
