= Benjamin Čolić =

Bosnian footballer

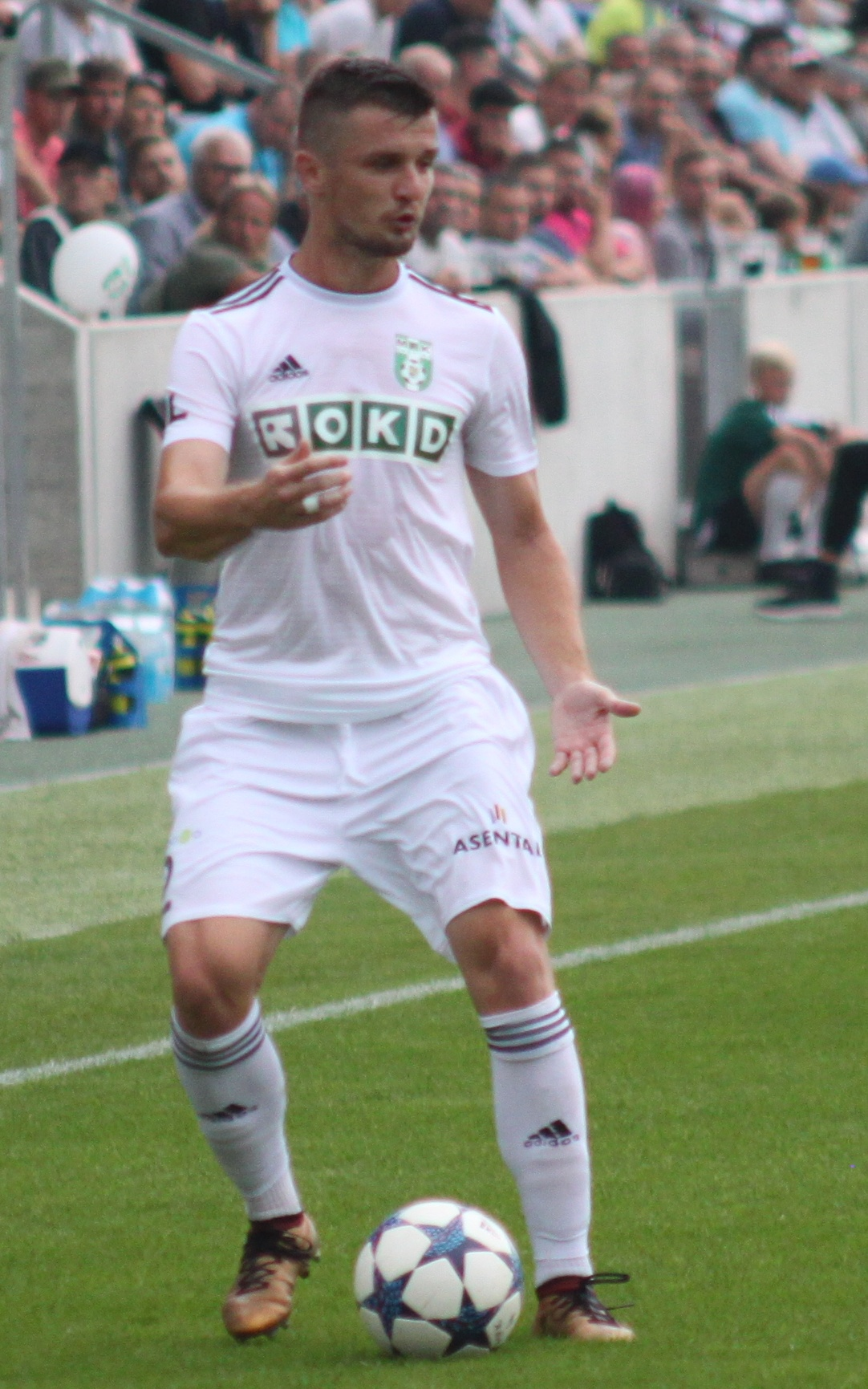
- Čolić playing for Karviná in September 2018

Personal information
- Full name: Benjamin Čolić
- Date of birth: 23 July 1991 (age 35)
- Place of birth: Sarajevo, SFR Yugoslavia
- Height: 1.72 m (5 ft 8 in)
- Position: Right-back

Team information
- Current team: Chrudim
- Number: 12

Youth career
- –2009: Željezničar

Senior career*
Years	Team	Apps	(Gls)
2009–2015	Željezničar	103	(1)
2015	Čelik Zenica	17	(3)
2016–2017	Zrinjski Mostar	11	(0)
2017	Olimpik	13	(1)
2017–2019	Karviná	50	(0)
2019–2023	Dynamo České Budějovice	99	(14)
2023	Tuzla City	4	(0)
2024–	Chrudim	9	(0)

International career
2009–2010	Bosnia and Herzegovina U19	5	(0)
2011–2012	Bosnia and Herzegovina U21	10	(0)
2011	Bosnia and Herzegovina	1	(0)
- * Club domestic league appearances and goals as of 20 June 2024

Benjamin Čolić (born 23 July 1991) is a Bosnian professional footballer who plays as a right-back for Chrudim in the Czech National Football League.

Čolić started his professional career at Željezničar, spending six years at the club, before joining Čelik Zenica in 2015. He then left Čelik and signed with Zrinjski Mostar in 2016. Later that year, he joined Olimpik. In July 2017, Čolić signed with Czech First League club Karviná. In the summer of 2019, he was transferred to Dynamo České Budějovice.

Čolić also represented the Bosnia and Herzegovina national team in 2011.

== Club career ==
=== Early career ===
Born in Sarajevo, SFR Yugoslavia, Čolić started his professional career at hometown club Željezničar in 2009. He played for the club all the way until 2015, making over 100 appearances for Željezničar and winning five trophies (three league titles and two cups).

Čolić left Željezničar in June 2015 and shortly after signed a contract with Čelik Zenica. After Čelik, he played for Zrinjski Mostar, winning one more league title, and Olimpik.

=== Karviná ===
On 17 July 2017, Čolić signed a two-year contract with Czech First League club Karviná. Less than a month later, he made his official debut for Karviná in a 1–1 home draw against Mladá Boleslav on 13 August 2017. He left the club after two years, in June 2019.

=== Dynamo České Budějovice ===
Shortly after leaving Karviná, Čolić signed a contract with Dynamo České Budějovice on 18 June 2019. His first game for Dynamo was in a 1–0 home defeat against Opava on 14 July 2019. Čolić scored his first goal for the club in a league game on 4 August 2019, a 1–1 home draw against Jablonec.

=== Tuzla City ===
On 4 October 2023, Čolić signed a contract with FK Tuzla City.

== International career ==
Čolić was part of the Bosnia and Herzegovina U19 and U21 national teams.

On 16 December 2011, he made an appearance for the Bosnia and Herzegovina national team in a 1–0 friendly loss against Poland.

== Career statistics ==
=== Club ===
As of match played 27 June 2020.

Appearances and goals by club, season and competition
Club	Season	League			Cup		Continental		Other		Total	
Club	Season	Division	Apps	Goals	Apps	Goals	Apps	Goals	Apps	Goals	Apps	Goals
Željezničar	2009–10	Bosnian Premier League	15	0	0	0	—		—		15	0
Željezničar	2010–11	Bosnian Premier League	11	0	2	0	0	0	—		13	0
Željezničar	2011–12	Bosnian Premier League	25	0	5	0	0	0	—		30	0
Željezničar	2012–13	Bosnian Premier League	27	0	6	0	2	0	—		35	0
Željezničar	2013–14	Bosnian Premier League	5	0	0	0	1	0	—		6	0
Željezničar	2014–15	Bosnian Premier League	20	1	2	0	4	0	—		26	1
Željezničar	Total		103	1	15	0	7	0	—		125	1
Čelik Zenica	2015–16	Bosnian Premier League	17	3	3	0	—		—		20	3
Zrinjski Mostar	2015–16	Bosnian Premier League	4	0	—		—		—		4	0
Zrinjski Mostar	2016–17	Bosnian Premier League	7	0	0	0	—		—		7	0
Zrinjski Mostar	Total		11	0	0	0	0	0	—		11	0
Olimpik	2016–17	Bosnian Premier League	13	1	—		—		—		13	1
Karviná	2017–18	Czech First League	20	0	1	0	—		—		21	0
Karviná	2018–19	Czech First League	28	0	3	0	—		2 (Note: Appearances in 2018–19 Czech First League relegation play-off)	0	33	0
Karviná	Total		48	0	4	0	—		2	0	54	0
Dynamo České Budějovice	2019–20	Czech First League	28	2	1	0	—		—		29	2
Career total			220	7	23	0	7	0	2	0	252	7

=== International ===
As of match played 16 December 2011.

National team	Year	Apps	Goals
Bosnia and Herzegovina
Bosnia and Herzegovina	2011	1	0
Total		1	0

== Honours ==
Željezničar

- Bosnian Premier League: 2009–10, 2011–12, 2012–13
- Bosnian Cup: 2010–11, 2011–12

Zrinjski Mostar

- Bosnian Premier League: 2015–16
