= Dragan Perić (footballer) =

Bosnian Croat footballer (born 1961)

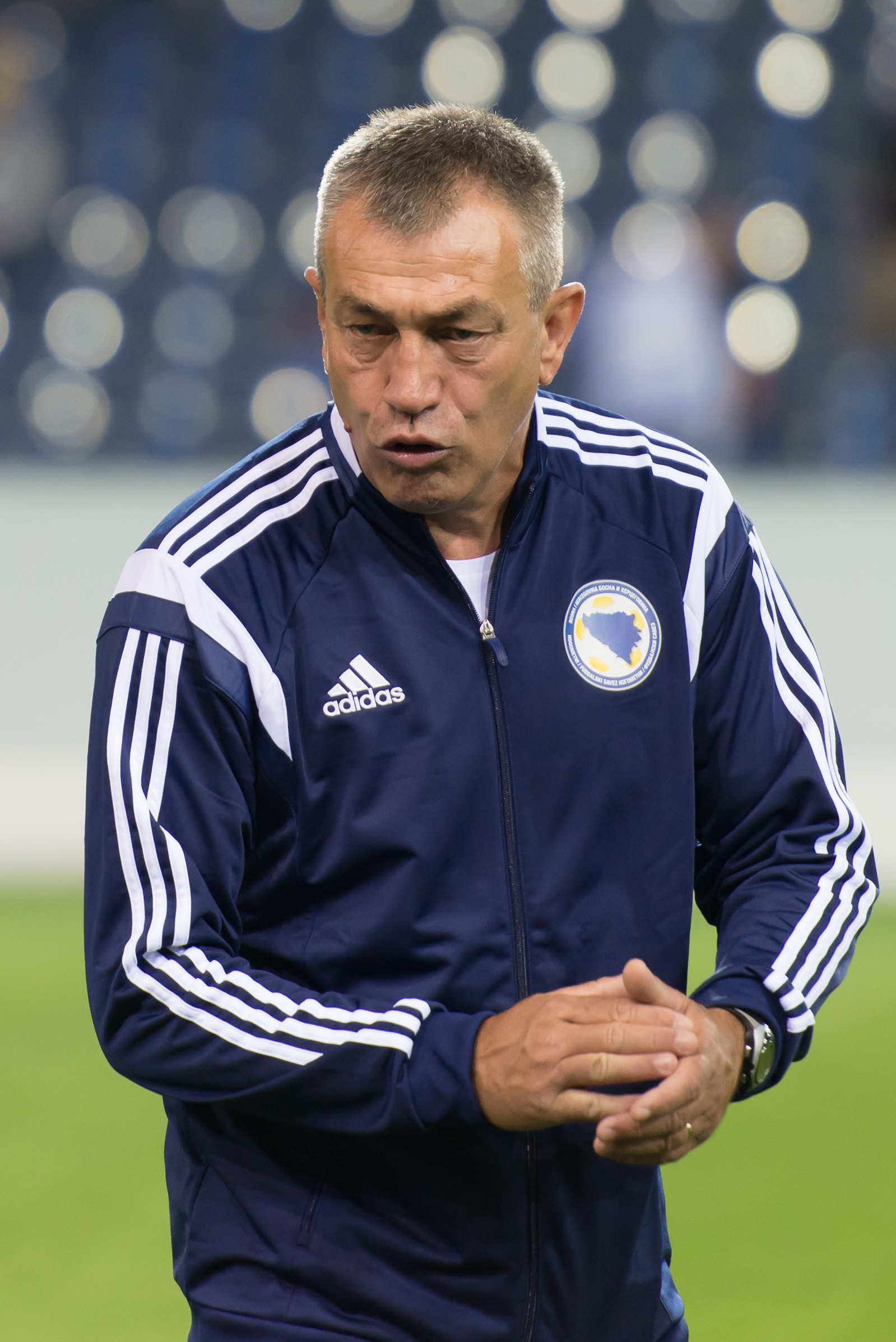
- Perić as Bosnia and Herzegovina U21 national team assistant coach in September 2014

Personal information
- Full name: Dragan Perić
- Date of birth: 12 February 1961 (age 65)
- Place of birth: Mostar, SFR Yugoslavia

Managerial career
- Years: Team
- 2004–2010: Zrinjski Mostar (assistant)
- 2011–2014: Bosnia and Herzegovina U21 (assistant)
- 2012–2013: Zrinjski Mostar
- 2014–2017: Bosnia and Herzegovina (assistant)

Dragan Perić (born 12 February 1961) is a Bosnian Croat professional football manager. He has worked as a manager, and assistant manager at Bosnian Premier League club Zrinjski Mostar.

Perić was also an assistant coach in the Bosnia and Herzegovina U21 and senior national teams.

== Managerial career ==
Perić started his managerial career in 2004 as an assistant manager of Franjo Džidić at hometown club Zrinjski Mostar. He stayed as an assistant until 2010, after which he became an assistant coach of Vlado Jagodić in the Bosnia and Herzegovina U21 national team on 10 May 2011. Simultaneously, Perić was named Zrinjski Mostar manager on 19 June 2012. He resigned as Zrinjski's manager on 31 March 2013.

On 27 December 2014, Perić became the assistant of Mehmed Baždarević in the Bosnia and Herzegovina national team. He stayed as assistant coach until October 2017, that is after Baždarević's contract expiration with the Bosnia and Herzegovina FA.

== Managerial statistics ==
As of 30 March 2013

Managerial record by team and tenure
Team	Nat	From	To	Record							
Team	Nat	From	To	G	W	D	L	GF	GA	GD	Win %
Zrinjski Mostar	(Bosnia and Herzegovina)	19 June 2012	31 March 2013	27	13	2	12	31	35	−4	48.15
Total				27	13	2	12	31	35	−4	48.15
