= Draženko Bogdan =

Bosnian footballer and manager

Personal information
- Full name: Draženko Bogdan
- Date of birth: 26 September 1977 (age 49)
- Place of birth: Mostar, SFR Yugoslavia
- Position: Defender

Team information
- Current team: Bosnia and Herzegovina U21 (assistant)

Senior career*
Years	Team	Apps	(Gls)
1996–2001	Zrinjski Mostar	132	(7)
Total		132	(7)

Managerial career
- 2009–2012: Zrinjski Mostar (youth team)
- 2012: Zrinjski Mostar (caretaker)
- 2014–2019: Bosnia and Herzegovina U21 (assistant)
- 2025–: Bosnia and Herzegovina U21 (assistant)
- * Club domestic league appearances and goals

Draženko Bogdan (born 4 November 1970) is a Bosnian professional football manager and former player. He is currently an assistant manager of the Bosnia and Herzegovina U21 national team.
