= 2010–11 First League of the Republika Srpska =

First League of the Republika Srpska
- Season: 2010–11
- Champions: Kozara; 1st First League title
- Promoted: Kozara
- Relegated: BSK; Famos
- Matches played: 182
- Goals scored: 450 (2.47 per match)
- Top goalscorer: Mladen Bojić (11 goals)

The 2010–11 First League of the Republika Srpska was the 16th since its establishment.

== Teams ==
- BSK Banja Luka
- Drina HE Višegrad
- Famos Vojkovići
- Kozara Gradiška
- Laktaši
- Mladost Gacko
- Modriča
- Podrinje Janja
- Proleter Teslić
- Radnik Bijeljina
- Sloboda Mrkonjić Grad
- Sloboda Novi Grad
- Sloga Doboj
- Sutjeska Foča

== League table ==
Pos	Team	Pld	W	D	L	GF	GA	GD	Pts	Promotion or relegation
1	Kozara Gradiška (C, P)	26	18	4	4	46	12	+34	58	Promotion to Premijer Liga BiH
2	Sutjeska Foča	26	12	7	7	37	27	+10	43	
3	Radnik Bijeljina	26	13	4	9	38	20	+18	43	
4	Mladost Gacko	26	13	1	12	35	38	−3	40	
5	Podrinje Janja	26	11	6	9	39	27	+12	39	
6	Sloga Doboj	26	10	8	8	35	41	−6	38	
7	Proleter Teslić	26	11	4	11	30	26	+4	37	
8	Sloboda Novi Grad	26	9	9	8	37	34	+3	36	
9	Modriča	26	10	5	11	32	33	−1	35	
10	Laktaši	26	9	8	9	21	28	−7	35	
11	Sloboda Mrkonjić Grad	26	8	6	12	30	33	−3	30	
12	Drina HE Višegrad	26	8	5	13	27	36	−9	29	
13	Famos Vojkovići (R)	26	8	4	14	29	42	−13	28	Relegation to Second League RS
14	BSK Banja Luka (R)	26	4	5	17	15	54	−39	17	Relegation to Second League RS

Source: SportDC
Rules for classification: 1st points; 2nd goal difference; 3rd goals scored
For deciding champions, qualification to higher rank and relegation: 1st points; 2nd head-to-head points; 3rd head-to-head goal difference; 4th head-to-head goals scored; 5th head-to-head away goals scored; 6th goal difference; 7th goals scored
(C) Champions; (P) Promoted; (R) Relegated
