= Boždarevići =

Boždarevići Бождаревићи
- Village
- Location within Bosnia and Herzegovina
- Coordinates: 43°44′N 17°53′E
- Country: Bosnia and Herzegovina
- Entity: Federation of Bosnia and Herzegovina
- Canton: Herzegovina-Neretva
- Municipality: Konjic

Area
  - Total: 1.74 sq mi (4.51 km^{2})

Population (2013)
  - Total: 57
  - Density: 33/sq mi (13/km^{2})
- Time zone: UTC+1 (CET)
  - Summer (DST): UTC+2 (CEST)

Boždarevići (Cyrillic: Бождаревићи) is a village in the municipality of Konjic, Bosnia and Herzegovina.

== Demographics ==
According to the 2013 census, its population was 57, all Bosniaks.
