= Abdulah Ibraković =

Bosnian football manager (born 1970)

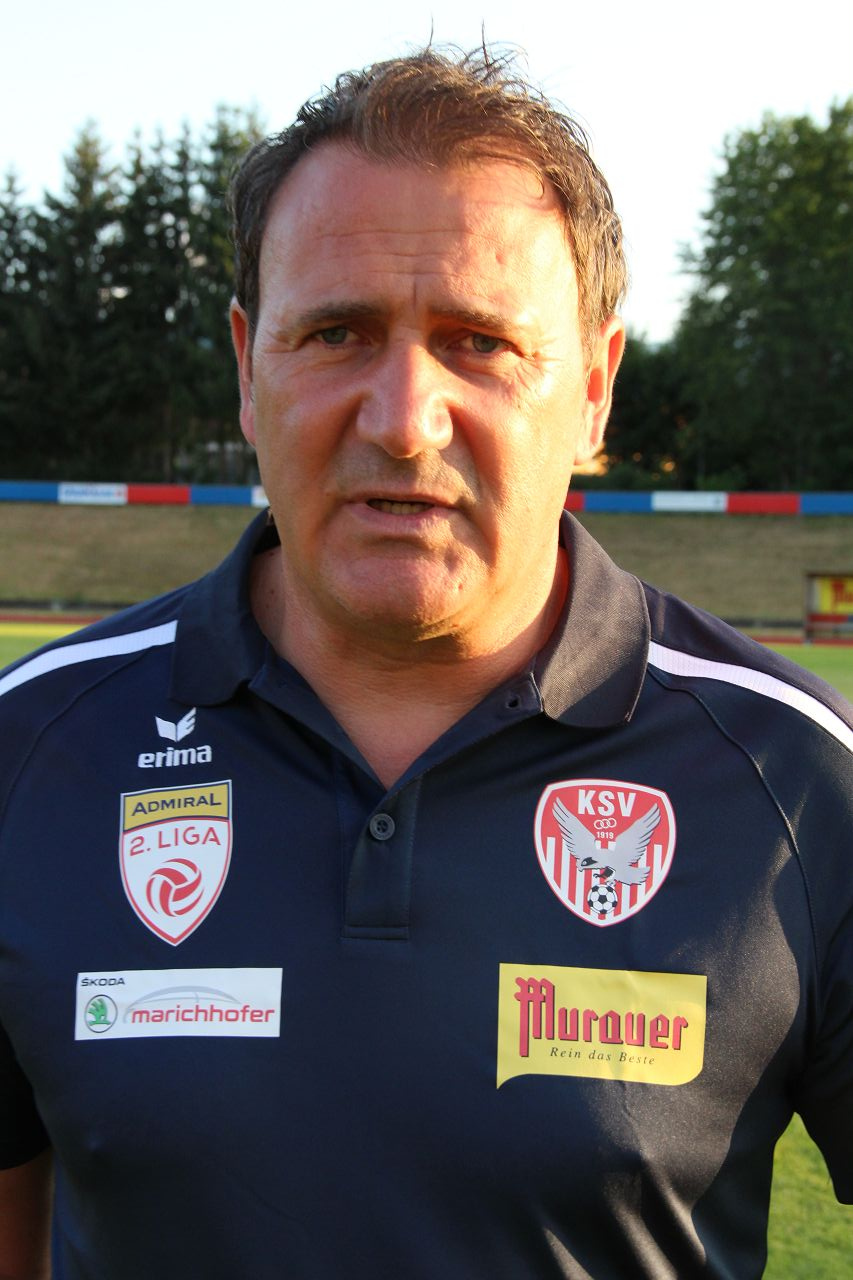
- Ibraković with Kapfenberg in 2021

Personal information
- Date of birth: 22 July 1970 (age 56)
- Place of birth: Doboj, SFR Yugoslavia
- Height: 1.87 m (6 ft 2 in)
- Position: Striker

Youth career
- Sloga Doboj

Senior career*
Years	Team	Apps	(Gls)
- Sloga Doboj
- VfB Friedrichshafen
- FC Rätia Bludenz
- Radnički Lukavac
- Gradina
- Osijek

Managerial career
- 2000–2002: Radnički Lukavac
- 2002–2003: Sloboda Tuzla
- 2003–2004: Bratstvo Gračanica
- 2004–2005: Radnički Lukavac
- 2006–2007: TOŠK Tešanj
- 2008–2011: Bosnia and Herzegovina U21 (assistant)
- 2008–2010: Velež Mostar
- 2010–2011: Čelik Zenica
- 2012: Sloboda Tuzla
- 2013–2015: Sarajevo (Sporting director)
- 2016–2017: Kapfenberg
- 2019–2020: Hetten
- 2020–2021: Kapfenberg
- 2021–2022: Prishtina
- 2022–2024: Kapfenberg
- * Club domestic league appearances and goals

Abdulah Ibraković (born 22 July 1970) is a Bosnian professional football manager and former player.

== Club career ==
Born in the town of Doboj, SR Bosnia-Herzegovina, SFR Yugoslavia, Ibraković began his career playing in the local club Sloga Doboj, competing back then in the Yugoslav Second League.

In his career as a player, a part from Bosnia, he also played in Germany, Austria and Croatia.

== International career ==
Ibraković was a member of the Bosnia and Herzegovina national team from 1996 to 1999.

== Managerial career ==
After retiring from playing, Ibraković began his managerial career. Initially, he managed Radnički Lukavac at the beginning of 2000, afterwards he worked at many clubs.

His biggest achievements so far are participating in the UEFA Intertoto Cup with Sloboda Tuzla, the Bosnian Cup final with Čelik Zenica in the 2010–11 season.

In the season 2013–14 he was named sporting director of Sarajevo. In his nearly 3 years of work at the club, Sarajevo won the cup title in the 2013–14 season, the Bosnian Premier League in the 2014–15 season and were also in the play-offs of the 2014–15 UEFA Europa League season.

After leaving Sarajevo, Ibraković managed Austrian club Kapfenberger SV from 2016 to 2017.

When it comes to international level, from 2002 to 2006, he was the coach of the Amateur Team of Bosnia and Herzegovina, then from 2006 to 2008, the head scout of the "A" national team of Bosnia and Herzegovina, and from 2008 to 2011, U21 national team assistant coach.

At his scholarship he had internships with Klaus Toppmöller, Ivan Ristić, Georg Zellhofer, Christoph Daum and Roberto Mancini.

Since October 2019, he has been the manager of Saudi Arabian MS League club Hetten.

On 13 July 2020, he returned to Kapfenberg.

== Honours ==
=== Manager ===
Čelik Zenica

- Bosnian Cup runner-up: 2010–11

Individual

- Bosnian Premier League Manager of the Year: 2009

== Other honours ==
- Best sport result of the Football Association of Bosnia and Herzegovina: 2009
- Author of the Book - Modern attacking Football - 2011
- He has a Master of science from the University of Sarajevo in sports management - 2013
- UEFA Pro Licence: 2006
