= 2023–24 FK Mladá Boleslav season =

FK Mladá Boleslav
2023–24 season
- Manager: Marek Kulič
- Stadium: Lokotrans Aréna
- Czech First League: 5th
- Czech Cup: Fourth round
- Top goalscorer: League: Vasil Kušej; Daniel Mareček (6 each); All: Daniel Mareček (8)
- Average home league attendance: 2,759

The 2023–24 season was FK Mladá Boleslav's 122nd season in existence and 20th consecutive in the Czech First League. They also competed in the Czech Cup.

== Players ==
=== First-team squad ===
As of 1 September 2023.

Note: Flags indicate national team as defined under FIFA eligibility rules; some limited exceptions apply. Players may hold more than one non-FIFA nationality.

| No. | Pos. | Nation | Player |
|---|---|---|---|
| 1 | GK | CZE | Matouš Trmal |
| 2 | DF | CZE | Martin Suchomel (on loan from Sparta Prague) |
| 4 | DF | CZE | David Šimek |
| 5 | MF | ZAM | Benson Sakala |
| 6 | MF | CZE | Ladislav Kodad |
| 7 | MF | CZE | Patrik Žitný |
| 8 | MF | CZE | Marek Matějovský |
| 9 | FW | BHR | Abdulla Yusuf Helal |
| 10 | MF | CZE | Tomáš Ladra |
| 11 | MF | CZE | Jakub Fulnek |
| 14 | DF | CZE | Tomáš Král |
| 15 | DF | UKR | Mykola Yarosh |
| 17 | DF | CZE | Marek Suchý |

| No. | Pos. | Nation | Player |
|---|---|---|---|
| 18 | FW | CZE | Matěj Pulkrab |
| 20 | MF | NGR | Solomon John |
| 23 | FW | CZE | Vasil Kušej |
| 26 | DF | SVK | Andrej Kadlec |
| 27 | MF | CZE | Vojtěch Kubista |
| 28 | MF | CZE | Lukáš Mašek |
| 30 | MF | CZE | Daniel Mareček |
| 31 | DF | CZE | Dominik Kostka |
| 32 | FW | GAM | Lamin Jawo |
| 33 | GK | CZE | Jan Šeda |
| 44 | DF | CZE | Ondřej Karafiát |
| 84 | DF | MTQ | Florent Poulolo |
| 99 | GK | CZE | Petr Mikulec |

=== Out on loan ===
Note: Flags indicate national team as defined under FIFA eligibility rules; some limited exceptions apply. Players may hold more than one non-FIFA nationality.

| No. | Pos. | Nation | Player |
|---|---|---|---|
| — | MF | SVK | Samuel Dancák (at Hradec Králové) |
| — | DF | CZE | Denis Donát (at Pardubice) |
| — | MF | CZE | Daniel Langhamer (at Chrudim) |

| No. | Pos. | Nation | Player |
|---|---|---|---|
| — | MF | CZE | Ladislav Dufek (at Varnsdorf) |
| — | FW | CZE | Vojtěch Stránský (at Varnsdorf) |

== Transfers ==
=== In ===
| Pos. | Player | Transferred from | Fee | Date | Source |
|---|---|---|---|---|---|
| FW | (Bahrain) Abdulla Yusuf Helal | (Indonesia) Persija Jakarta | Free | 1 July 2023 | |
| FW | (Czech Republic) Matěj Pulkrab | (Germany) SV Sandhausen | Free | 1 July 2023 | |
| GK | (Czech Republic) Matouš Trmal | (Portugal) Vitória de Guimarães | Undisclosed | 7 July 2023 | |

=== Out ===
| Pos. | Player | Transferred to | Fee | Date | Source |

== Pre-season and friendlies ==
Win Draw Loss

| 23 June 2023 Friendly | Mladá Boleslav (Czech Republic) | 3–2 | (Czech Republic) Táborsko |
| 17:45 |

| 24 June 2023 Friendly | Slovan Liberec (Czech Republic) | 0–2 | (Czech Republic) Mladá Boleslav |
| 13:30 |

| 1 July 2023 Friendly | Mladá Boleslav (Czech Republic) | 4–4 | (Czech Republic) Dukla Prague |
| 10:15 |

| 8 July 2023 Friendly | Mladá Boleslav (Czech Republic) | 2–3 | (Czech Republic) Sellier & Bellot Vlašim |
| 11:00 |

| 11 July 2023 Friendly | Cracovia (Poland) | 1–1 | (Czech Republic) Mladá Boleslav |
| 16:30 |

| 14 July 2023 Friendly | Warta Poznań (Poland) | 0–1 | (Czech Republic) Mladá Boleslav |
| 11:00 |

| 8 September 2023 Friendly | Mladá Boleslav (Czech Republic) | Cancelled | (Czech Republic) Jihlava |
| 11:00 |

| 11 October 2023 Friendly | RB Leipzig (Germany) | 2–4 | (Czech Republic) Mladá Boleslav |
| 13:00 |

| 13 January 2024 Friendly | Mladá Boleslav (Czech Republic) | 2–0 | (Czech Republic) Táborsko |
| 11:00 |

| 27 January 2024 Friendly | Mladá Boleslav (Czech Republic) | 5–1 | (Ukraine) LNZ Cherkasy | Side, Turkey |
| 17:30 | | | | Stadium: Arslan Zeki Demirci Spor Kompleksi Stadyumu |

| 31 January 2024 Friendly | Mladá Boleslav (Czech Republic) | 2–0 | (Montenegro) Budućnost Podgorica | Turkey |
| 15:00 |

| 3 February 2024 Friendly | Mladá Boleslav (Czech Republic) | 1–1 | (Bulgaria) Ludogorets Razgrad | Belek, Turkey |
| 17:30 | | | | Stadium: Cornelia Sportcomplex Pitch 1 |

== Competitions ==
=== Overall record ===
| Competition | First match | Last match | Starting round | Final position | Record | | | | | | | |
| Competition | First match | Last match | Starting round | Final position | Pld | W | D | L | GF | GA | GD | Win % |
|---|---|---|---|---|---|---|---|---|---|---|---|---|
| Czech First League | 23 July 2023 | 27 April 2024 | Matchday 1 | | 29 | 12 | 7 | 10 | 49 | 45 | +4 | 41.38 |
| Czech Cup | 30 August 2023 | 1 November 2023 | Second round | Fourth round | 3 | 2 | 0 | 1 | 8 | 5 | +3 | 66.67 |
| Total | | | | | 32 | 14 | 7 | 11 | 57 | 50 | +7 | 43.75 |

Last updated: 21 April 2024
Source: Soccerway

=== Czech First League ===
==== League table ====
| Pos | Team | Pld | W | D | L | GF | GA | GD | Pts | Qualification or relegation |
|---|---|---|---|---|---|---|---|---|---|---|
| 3 | Viktoria Plzeň | 30 | 19 | 5 | 6 | 67 | 33 | +34 | 62 | Qualification for the Championship group |
| 4 | Baník Ostrava | 30 | 13 | 6 | 11 | 48 | 39 | +9 | 45 | Qualification for the Championship group |
| 5 | Mladá Boleslav | 30 | 12 | 8 | 10 | 50 | 46 | +4 | 44 | Qualification for the Championship group |
| 6 | Slovácko | 30 | 11 | 8 | 11 | 39 | 40 | −1 | 41 | Qualification for the Championship group |
| 7 | Slovan Liberec | 30 | 10 | 10 | 10 | 46 | 46 | 0 | 40 | Qualification for the Play-off |

Source: Fortuna Liga
Rules for classification: 1) Points; 2) Head-to-head points; 3) Head-to-head goal difference; 4) Head-to-head goals scored; 5) Goal difference; 6) Goals scored; 7) Fair-play ranking; 8) Draw.

==== Results summary ====
| Overall | | | | | | | | Home | | | | | | Away | | | | | |
| Pld | W | D | L | GF | GA | GD | Pts | W | D | L | GF | GA | GD | W | D | L | GF | GA | GD |
|---|---|---|---|---|---|---|---|---|---|---|---|---|---|---|---|---|---|---|---|
| 29 | 12 | 7 | 10 | 49 | 45 | +4 | 43 | 8 | 2 | 5 | 29 | 22 | +7 | 4 | 5 | 5 | 20 | 23 | −3 |

Last updated: 21 April 2024.
Source: Fortuna Liga

==== Results by round ====
| Round | 1 | 2 | 3 | 4 | 5 | 6 | 7 | 8 | 9 | 10 | 11 | 12 | 13 | 14 | 15 | 16 | 17 | 18 | 19 | 20 | 21 | 22 | 23 | 24 | 25 | 26 | 27 | 28 | 29 | 30 |
|---|---|---|---|---|---|---|---|---|---|---|---|---|---|---|---|---|---|---|---|---|---|---|---|---|---|---|---|---|---|---|
| Ground | H | H | A | H | A | H | A | H | A | H | A | A | H | A | H | A | H | A | H | A | H | A | H | A | H | H | A | H | A | H |
| Result | W | D | W | L | D | L | L | W | W | W | L | W | W | L | W | L | D | L | L | D | L | D | W | D | W | W | D | L | W | |
| Position | 3 | 5 | 3 | 5 | 5 | 7 | 9 | 6 | 7 | 6 | 7 | 6 | 5 | 6 | 4 | 6 | 6 | 7 | 7 | 5 | 7 | 6 | 6 | 6 | 6 | 5 | 5 | 5 | 5 | |

Updated to match(es) played on 21 April 2024. Source:
A = Away; H = Home; W = Win; D = Draw; L = Loss

==== Matches ====
The league fixtures were unveiled on 21 June 2023.

| 23 July 2023 1 | Mladá Boleslav | 3–1 | Jablonec | Mladá Boleslav |
| 15:00 CEST (UTC+2) | Kušej 8'; Kostka 47'; Jawo 57' | Report | Alégué 75' | Stadium: Lokotrans Aréna; Attendance: 3,431; Referee: Pavel Orel |

| 30 July 2023 2 | Mladá Boleslav | 2–2 | Slovan Liberec | Mladá Boleslav |
| 15:00 CEST (UTC+2) | Pulkrab 78'; Suchý 88' | Report | Chaluš 8'; Kulenović 42' | Stadium: Lokotrans Aréna; Attendance: 4,112; Referee: Daniel Vokoun |

| 5 August 2023 3 | Karviná | 1–2 | Mladá Boleslav | Karviná |
| 15:00 CEST (UTC+2) | Mikuš 70' | Report | Jawo 6'; Helal 19' | Stadium: Městský stadion Attendance: 3,226; Referee: Jan Petřík |

| 13 August 2023 4 | Mladá Boleslav | 0–1 | Slavia Prague | Mladá Boleslav |
| 15:00 CEST (UTC+2) | | Report | Poulolo 59' (o.g.) | Stadium: Lokotrans Aréna; Attendance: 5,000; Referee: Jan Machálek |

| 19 August 2023 5 | Slovácko | 2–2 | Mladá Boleslav | Uherské Hradiště |
| 15:00 CEST (UTC+2) | Vecheta 11'; Kalabiška 90+2' | Report | Mareček 45+2', 53' | Stadium: Městský fotbalový stadion Miroslava Valenty; Attendance: 3,992; Referee: Karel Rouček |

| 2 September 2023 7 | Baník Ostrava | 2–0 | Mladá Boleslav | Ostrava |
| 18:00 CEST (UTC+2) | Ewerton 49'; Karafiát 59' (o.g.) | Report | | Stadium: Městský stadion Attendance: 7,218; Referee: Ondřej Berka |

| 16 September 2023 8 | Mladá Boleslav | 5–1 | Hradec Králové | Mladá Boleslav |
| 15:00 CEST (UTC+2) | Mareček 5', 21'; Karafiát 14'; Kušej 48'; Suchý 80' | Report | Juliš 57' | Stadium: Lokotrans Aréna; Attendance: 3,011; Referee: Dalibor Černý |

| 23 September 2023 9 | České Budějovice | 1–2 | Mladá Boleslav | České Budějovice |
| 15:00 CEST (UTC+2) | Ondrášek 75' | Report | Kostka 8'; Suchomel 83' | Stadium: Stadion Střelecký ostrov Attendance: 2,698; Referee: Karel Rouček |

| 1 October 2023 10 | Mladá Boleslav | 2–1 | Bohemians 1905 | Mladá Boleslav |
| 15:00 CEST (UTC+2) | Helal 29'; Pulkrab 84' | Report | Matoušek 60' | Stadium: Lokotrans Aréna; Attendance: 3,331; Referee: Petr Hocek |

| 7 October 2023 11 | Sigma Olomouc | 4–0 | Mladá Boleslav | Olomouc |
| 15:00 CEST (UTC+2) | Chvátal 26'; Zmrzlý 63'; Pokorný 66'; Beneš 89' | Report | | Stadium: Andrův stadion Attendance: 2,939; Referee: Tomáš Klíma |

| 21 October 2023 12 | Zlín | 5–9 | Mladá Boleslav | Zlín |
| 15:00 CEST (UTC+2) | Fantiš 13'; Janetzký 15'; Reiter (yellow card) 42'; Bartošák 46'; Vukadinović 64' (pen.); Kovinić (yellow card) 68', (goal) 85' | Report | Mareček 11', 60'; Kušej 49', 87', (yellow card) 62'; Jawo 51', 53'; Pulkrab (yellow card) 63'; Matějovský 78'; Helal 83'; Poulolo (yellow card) 90+4'; John 90+5', (yellow card) 90+5' | Stadium: Letná Stadion; Attendance: 2,523; Referee: Ladislav Szikszay |

| 29 October 2023 13 | Mladá Boleslav | 3–1 | Sparta Prague | Mladá Boleslav |
| 15:00 CET (UTC+1) | Kušej 24'; Matějovský 45'; Jawo 87' | Report | Pešek 29' | Stadium: Lokotrans Aréna; Attendance: 5,000; Referee: Dalibor Černý |

| 4 November 2023 14 | Teplice | 1–0 | Mladá Boleslav | Teplice |
| 15:00 CET (UTC+1) | Knapík 89' | Report | | Stadium: Na Stínadlech; Attendance: 3,387; Referee: Ondřej Berka |

| 11 November 2023 15 | Mladá Boleslav | 1–0 | Pardubice | Mladá Boleslav |
| 15:00 CET (UTC+1) | Kušej 47' | Report | | Stadium: Lokotrans Aréna; Attendance: 1,510; Referee: Petr Hocek |

| 25 November 2023 16 | Slovan Liberec | 2–1 | Mladá Boleslav | Liberec |
| 15:00 CET (UTC+1) | Ghali 7', 70' | Report | Pulkrab 10' | Stadium: Stadion u Nisy; Attendance: 1,415; Referee: Karel Rouček |

| 6 December 2023 6 | Mladá Boleslav | 1–3 | Viktoria Plzeň | Mladá Boleslav |
| 17:00 CET (UTC+1) | Suchomel 45+3' | Report | Šulc 5', 51'; Hranáč 90+5' | Stadium: Lokotrans Aréna; Attendance: 1,121; Referee: Jan Všetečka |
Note: The match was originally scheduled for 27 August 2023, but was postponed due to Viktoria Plzeň's participation in European competition.

| 10 December 2023 18 | Slavia Prague | 2–0 | Mladá Boleslav | Prague |
| 18:00 CET (UTC+1) | Holeš 49'; Jurečka 53' (pen.) | Report | | Stadium: Fortuna Arena; Attendance: 16,064; Referee: Stanislav Volek |

| 13 December 2023 17 | Mladá Boleslav | 2–2 | Karviná | Mladá Boleslav |
| 17:00 CET (UTC+1) | Ladra 25'; Helal 64' | Report | Memić 7'; Doležal 13' | Stadium: Lokotrans Aréna; Attendance: 960; Referee: Ladislav Szikszay |
Note: The match was originally scheduled for 5 December 2023, but was postponed due to snow.

| 16 December 2023 19 | Mladá Boleslav | 0–1 | Slovácko | Mladá Boleslav |
| 15:00 CET (UTC+1) | | Report | Valenta 59' | Stadium: Lokotrans Aréna; Attendance: 1,036; Referee: Ondřej Berka |

| 10 February 2024 20 | Viktoria Plzeň | 1–1 | Mladá Boleslav | Plzeň |
| 18:00 CET (UTC+1) | Chorý 63' | Report | Ladra 87' (pen.) | Stadium: Doosan Arena; Attendance: 9,086; Referee: Dalibor Černý |

=== Czech Cup ===
| 26 September 2023 Second round | Mladá Boleslav | 4–2 | Ústí nad Labem | Mladá Boleslav |
| 17:00 CEST (UTC+2) | Mašek 6', 88'; Mareček 44', 52' | Report | A. Tarasenko 83'; M. Trenda 84' | Stadium: Lokotrans Aréna; Attendance: 357; Referee: Jan Petřík |

| 26 September 2023 Third round | Mladá Boleslav | 4–2 | Prostějov | Mladá Boleslav |
| 17:00 CEST (UTC+2) | Helal 39', 45+2' (pen.); Poulolo 73'; Pulkrab 87' | Report | M. Zapletal 17'; P. Slaměna 88' | Stadium: Lokotrans Aréna; Attendance: 516; Referee: Tomáš Ulrich |

| 1 November 2023 Fourth round | Slovan Liberec | 1–0 | Mladá Boleslav | Liberec |
| 16:30 CET (UTC+1) | Horský 90+1' | Report | | Stadium: Stadion u Nisy; Attendance: 1,227; Referee: Stanislav Volek |
