= 2022–23 FK Mladá Boleslav season =

FK Mladá Boleslav
2022–23 season
- Chairman: Josef Dufek
- Manager: Pavel Hoftych
- Stadium: Lokotrans Aréna
- Czech First League: 9th
- Czech Cup: Fourth round

The 2022–23 season was the 121st in the history of FK Mladá Boleslav and their 19th consecutive season in the top flight. The club will participate in the Czech First League and the Czech Cup.

== Players ==
As of 25 August 2022.

Note: Flags indicate national team as defined under FIFA eligibility rules; some limited exceptions apply. Players may hold more than one non-FIFA nationality.

No.	Pos.	Nation	Player
1	GK	SVK	Martin Polaček
3	DF	CZE	Matyáš Coňk
4	DF	CZE	David Šimek
7	MF	CZE	Patrik Žitný
8	MF	CZE	Marek Matějovský
9	MF	CZE	Tomáš Ladra
10	MF	CZE	Jiří Skalák
11	MF	CZE	Jakub Fulnek
12	MF	CZE	Ladislav Dufek
13	DF	CZE	Denis Donát
14	MF	CZE	Vojtěch Stránský
15	DF	NOR	Hasan Jahić
16	MF	SVK	Samuel Dancák
17	DF	CZE	Marek Suchý

No.	Pos.	Nation	Player
19	DF	CZE	Radek Látal
21	FW	CZE	Milan Škoda
22	MF	CZE	Antonín Vaníček
23	GK	CZE	Kryštof Lichtenberg
24	FW	CZE	Ladislav Krobot
25	MF	CZE	Denis Darmovzal
26	MF	CZE	David Pech
27	MF	CZE	Vojtěch Kubista
28	MF	CZE	Lukáš Mašek
30	MF	CZE	Daniel Mareček (on loan from Bohemians 1905)
33	GK	CZE	Jan Šeda
44	DF	CZE	Ondřej Karafiát
90	MF	NGR	Ubong Moses Ekpai (on loan from Slavia Prague)

=== Out on loan ===
Note: Flags indicate national team as defined under FIFA eligibility rules; some limited exceptions apply. Players may hold more than one non-FIFA nationality.

No.	Pos.	Nation	Player
—	MF	CZE	Ladislav Mužík (at Bohemians 1905)
—	DF	CZE	Martin Rolinek (at Karviná)
—	DF	CZE	Kryštof Obadal (at Fotbal Třinec)

No.	Pos.	Nation	Player
—	DF	CZE	Daniel Langhamer (at Vlašim)
—	GK	CZE	Jáchym Šerák (at Varnsdorf)

== Competitions ==
=== Czech First League ===
==== League table ====
Pos	Team	Pld	W	D	L	GF	GA	GD	Pts	Qualification or relegation
7	Slovan Liberec	30	10	8	12	39	43	−4	38	Qualification for the play-off
8	Hradec Králové	30	11	5	14	34	40	−6	38	Qualification for the play-off
9	Mladá Boleslav	30	9	10	11	39	42	−3	37	Qualification for the play-off
10	České Budějovice	30	10	5	15	35	54	−19	35	Qualification for the play-off
11	Jablonec	30	9	8	13	46	57	−11	35	Qualification for the relegation group

Source: Fortuna Liga
Rules for classification: 1) Points; 2) Head-to-head points; 3) Head-to-head goal difference; 4) Head-to-head goals scored; 5) Goal difference; 6) Goals scored; 7) Fair-play ranking; 8) Draw.

Pos	Team	Pld	W	D	L	GF	GA	GD	Pts	Qualification or relegation	SPA	SLA	PLZ	BOH	SLO	OLO
1	Sparta Prague (C)	35	23	9	3	76	33	+43	78	Qualification for the Champions League third qualifying round	—	3–2	0–1	2–1	—	—
2	Slavia Prague	35	24	6	5	98	31	+67	78	Qualification for the Europa League third qualifying round (Note: Slavia Prague qualified for the Europa League as Czech Cup winners.)	—	—	2–1	6–0	4–0	—
3	Viktoria Plzeň	35	18	7	10	60	38	+22	61	Qualification for the Europa Conference League second qualifying round	—	—	—	0–2	2–2	1–3
4	Bohemians 1905	35	15	7	13	56	58	−2	52	Qualification for the Europa Conference League second qualifying round	—	—	—	—	0–0	0–1
5	Slovácko	35	13	11	11	40	46	−6	50		0–0	—	—	—	—	2–2
6	Sigma Olomouc	35	12	12	11	53	47	+6	48		0–1	2–3	—	—	—	—

Source: Fortuna Liga
Legend: Blue = home team win; Yellow = draw; Red = away team win.
Rules for classification: 1) Total points; 2) Points earned in regular season; 3) Head-to-head points (regular season); 4) Head-to-head goal difference (regular season); 5) Head-to-head goals scored (regular season); 5) Goal difference (all matches); 6) Goals scored (all matches); 7) Fair-play ranking; 8) Draw.
(C) Champions
Notes:

Pos	Team	Pld	W	D	L	GF	GA	GD	Pts	Qualification or relegation	OST	TEP	JAB	PCE	ZLN	BRN
11	Baník Ostrava	35	11	9	15	53	50	+3	42		—	2–1	—	2–4	—	4–0
12	Teplice	35	11	9	15	45	67	−22	42		—	—	—	1–0	2–1	1–1
13	Jablonec	35	10	10	15	49	63	−14	40		1–1	0–2	—	—	—	1–0
14	Pardubice (O)	35	11	4	20	38	63	−25	37	Qualification for the relegation play-offs	—	—	2–0	—	1–2	—
15	Trinity Zlín (O)	35	7	13	15	43	60	−17	34	Qualification for the relegation play-offs	2–1	—	1–1	—	—	—
16	Zbrojovka Brno (R)	35	8	9	18	41	64	−23	33	Relegation to FNL	—	—	—	0–2	0–0	—

Source: Fortuna Liga
Legend: Blue = home team win; Yellow = draw; Red = away team win.
Rules for classification: 1) Total points; 2) Points earned in regular season; 3) Head-to-head points (regular season); 4) Head-to-head goal difference (regular season); 5) Head-to-head goals scored (regular season); 5) Goal difference (all matches); 6) Goals scored (all matches); 7) Fair-play ranking; 8) Draw.
(O) Play-off winners; (R) Relegated

==== Matches ====
The league fixtures were announced on 22 June 2022.

30 July 2022 1	FK Mladá Boleslav	v	Mladá Boleslav
CEST (UTC+2)			Stadium: Lokotrans Aréna
