= 2021–22 FK Mladá Boleslav season =

FK Mladá Boleslav
2021–22 season
- Chairman: Josef Dufek
- Manager: Karel Jarolím
- Stadium: Lokotrans Aréna
- Czech First League: 6th
- Czech Cup: Pre-season
Home colours	Away colours

The 2021–22 season was the 29th season in the existence of FK Mladá Boleslav and the club's 8th consecutive season in the top flight of Czech football. In addition to the domestic league, FK Mladá Boleslav participated in the Czech Cup.

== Players ==
=== First-team squad ===
As of 14 July 2021.

Note: Flags indicate national team as defined under FIFA eligibility rules; some limited exceptions apply. Players may hold more than one non-FIFA nationality.

No.	Pos.	Nation	Player
1	GK	CZE	Jáchym Šerák
4	DF	CZE	David Šimek
6	MF	CZE	Dominik Mašek
7	MF	CZE	Milan Jirásek
8	MF	CZE	Marek Matějovský
9	MF	CZE	Tomáš Ladra
10	MF	CZE	Jiří Skalák
11	MF	CZE	Ladislav Mužík
13	GK	CZE	Pavel Halouska
14	FW	CZE	Vojtěch Stránský
16	MF	SVK	Samuel Dancák
17	DF	CZE	Marek Suchý
19	MF	CZE	Michael Hönig

No.	Pos.	Nation	Player
20	MF	BRA	Ewerton
21	FW	CZE	Milan Škoda
22	DF	CZE	David Douděra
23	FW	CZE	Daniel Fila
27	DF	CZE	Dominik Preisler
28	MF	CZE	Lukáš Mašek
32	MF	CZE	Vojtěch Smrž (on loan from MFK Karviná)
33	GK	CZE	Jan Šeda
77	DF	CZE	David Jurásek
—	DF	CZE	Ondřej Karafiát (on loan from Slavia Prague)
—	DF	CZE	Dominik Plechatý (on loan from Sparta Prague)
—	MF	CZE	David Jurásek

=== Out on loan ===
Note: Flags indicate national team as defined under FIFA eligibility rules; some limited exceptions apply. Players may hold more than one non-FIFA nationality.

No.	Pos.	Nation	Player
—	FW	CZE	Ladislav Krobot (at FK Ústí nad Labem)
—	DF	CZE	Jakub Klíma (at FC Hradec Králové)

No.	Pos.	Nation	Player
—	MF	CZE	Jakub Fulnek (at Bohemians 1905)

== Competitions ==
=== Czech First League ===
==== League table ====
Pos	Team	Pld	W	D	L	GF	GA	GD	Pts	Qualification or relegation
5	Baník Ostrava	30	14	9	7	54	39	+15	51	Qualification for the championship group
6	Hradec Králové	30	9	13	8	38	40	−2	40	Qualification for the championship group
7	Mladá Boleslav	30	11	5	14	45	48	−3	38	Qualification for the play-off
8	Slovan Liberec	30	10	7	13	29	38	−9	37	Qualification for the play-off
9	Sigma Olomouc	30	9	10	11	39	37	+2	37	Qualification for the play-off

Source: Fortuna Liga
Rules for classification: 1) Points; 2) Head-to-head points; 3) Head-to-head goal difference; 4) Head-to-head goals scored; 5) Goal difference; 6) Goals scored; 7) Fair-play ranking; 8) Draw.

Pos	Team	Pld	W	D	L	GF	GA	GD	Pts	Qualification or relegation	PLZ	SLA	SPA	SLO	OST	HKR
1	Viktoria Plzeň (C)	35	26	7	2	63	21	+42	85	Qualification for the Champions League second qualifying round	—	—	3–0	3–1	1–0	—
2	Slavia Prague	35	24	6	5	80	27	+53	78	Qualification for the Europa Conference League second qualifying round	1–1	—	1–2	3–0	—	—
3	Sparta Prague	35	22	7	6	72	40	+32	73	Qualification for the Europa Conference League second qualifying round	—	—	—	1–2	3–1	1–1
4	Slovácko	35	21	5	9	59	38	+21	68	Qualification to Europa League third qualifying round (Note: Slovácko qualified for the Europa League as Czech Cup winners.)	—	—	—	—	3–1	3–0
5	Baník Ostrava	35	15	10	10	60	48	+12	55		—	1–1	—	—	—	3–1
6	Hradec Králové	35	10	14	11	44	52	−8	44		0–2	4–3	—	—	—	—

Source: Fortuna Liga
Legend: Blue = home team win; Yellow = draw; Red = away team win.
Rules for classification: 1) Total points; 2) Points earned in regular season; 3) Head-to-head points (regular season); 4) Head-to-head goal difference (regular season); 5) Head-to-head goals scored (regular season); 5) Goal difference (all matches); 6) Goals scored (all matches); 7) Fair-play ranking; 8) Draw.
(C) Champions
Notes:

Pos	Team	Pld	W	D	L	GF	GA	GD	Pts	Qualification or relegation	PCE	ZLN	JAB	BOH	TEP	KAR
11	Pardubice	35	9	10	16	42	68	−26	37		—	1–1	—	—	—	2–0
12	Fastav Zlín	35	9	9	17	43	60	−17	36		—	—	1–1	1–4	3–0	—
13	Jablonec	35	6	16	13	27	48	−21	34		0–1	—	—	1–1	—	2–0
14	Bohemians 1905 (O)	35	8	10	17	45	61	−16	34	Qualification for the relegation play-offs	0–1	—	—	—	—	4–0
15	Teplice (O)	35	8	5	22	33	59	−26	29	Qualification for the relegation play-offs	0–2	—	0–1	2–2	—	—
16	Karviná (R)	35	3	10	22	33	63	−30	19	Relegation to the FNL	—	1–1	—	—	2–2	—

Source: Fortuna Liga
Legend: Blue = home team win; Yellow = draw; Red = away team win.
Rules for classification: 1) Total points; 2) Points earned in regular season; 3) Head-to-head points (regular season); 4) Head-to-head goal difference (regular season); 5) Head-to-head goals scored (regular season); 5) Goal difference (all matches); 6) Goals scored (all matches); 7) Fair-play ranking; 8) Draw.
(O) Play-off winners; (R) Relegated

==== Matches ====
25 July 2021 1	Viktoria Plzeň	2–1	Mladá Boleslav	Plzeň
16:00 CEST (UTC+2)	Beauguel 28'; Řezník 36'; N'Diaye (yellow card) 43'	Report	Karafiát (yellow card) 23'; Škoda 62'; Douděra (yellow card) 90+5'	Stadium: Doosan Arena; Attendance: 4,321; Referee: Ondřej Berka

31 July 2021 2	Mladá Boleslav	3–0	Jablonec	Mladá Boleslav
16:00 CEST (UTC+2)	Fila 11'; Škoda 14', 79'	Report		Stadium: Lokotrans Aréna; Attendance: 2,471; Referee: Miroslav Zelinka

8 August 2021 3	Pardubice	1–1	Mladá Boleslav	Prague (Note: Pardubice continued playing their home matches in Ďolíček due to the rebuilding of their own stadium Pod Vinicí.)
16:00 CEST (UTC+2)	Kostka 38'	Report	Skalák 75'	Stadium: Ďolíček; Attendance: 922; Referee: Ondřej Ginzel

14 August 2021 4	Mladá Boleslav	0–2	Slavia Prague	Mladá Boleslav
16:00 CEST (UTC+2)	Smrž (red card) 45+2'; Plechatý (yellow card) 66'	Report	Kuchta 36'; Kúdela (yellow card) 40'; Schranz 83'; Hromada (yellow card) 86'	Stadium: Lokotrans Aréna; Attendance: 3,712; Referee: Miroslav Zelinka

21 August 2021 5	Mladá Boleslav	3–1	Teplice	Mladá Boleslav
16:00 CEST (UTC+2)	Fila 23'; Skalák 35' (pen.); Stránský 89'	Report	Mareš 26'	Stadium: Lokotrans Aréna; Attendance: 2,512; Referee: Tomáš Klíma

28 August 2021 6	Baník Ostrava	1–0	Mladá Boleslav	Ostrava
16:00 CEST (UTC+2)	Fleišman 31'; Sor (yellow card) 90+2'; Kuzmanović (yellow card) 90+3'	Report	Dancák (yellow card) 43'; Ewerton (yellow card) 76'; Jurásek (yellow card) 90+2'; Karafiát (yellow card) 90+3'	Stadium: Městský stadion Attendance: 5,071; Referee: Karel Hrubeš

12 September 2021 7	Mladá Boleslav	3–3	Sigma Olomouc	Mladá Boleslav
16:00 CEST (UTC+2)	Škoda 24', (yellow card) 45+1'; Douděra (yellow card) 64'; Macík 86' (o.g.); Karafiát 90'	Report	Hála 10'; Růsek 23'; Chvátal (yellow card) 24'; González (yellow card) 32'; Jemelka (yellow card) 59'; Vaněček 73'; Macík (yellow card) 80'	Stadium: Lokotrans Aréna; Attendance: 2,832; Referee: Jan Machálek

18 September 2021 8	Slovan Liberec	2–1	Mladá Boleslav	Liberec
16:00 CEST (UTC+2)	Helal 82' (pen.); Tupta 86'	Report	Douděra 29'	Stadium: Stadion u Nisy; Attendance: 1,570; Referee: Petr Hocek

26 September 2021 9	Mladá Boleslav	3–5	Slovácko	Mladá Boleslav
16:00 CEST (UTC+2)	Ewerton 45+2', 73', 87'	Report	Kohút 17'; Jurečka 23', 57'; Kalabiška 26'; Petržela 61'	Stadium: Lokotrans Aréna; Attendance: 2,223; Referee: Pavel Julínek

3 October 2021 10	Karviná	0–1	Mladá Boleslav	Karviná
16:00 CEST (UTC+2)		Report	Matějovský 81'	Stadium: Městský stadion Attendance: 2,082; Referee: Jan Petřík

16 October 2021 11	Mladá Boleslav	4–1	Bohemians 1905	Mladá Boleslav
16:00 CEST (UTC+2)	Ewerton 65'; Jurásek 79'; Fila 89'; Skalák 90+4' (pen.)	Report	Puškáč 61'	Stadium: Lokotrans Aréna; Attendance: 2,429; Referee: Tomáš Batík

24 October 2021 12	Sparta Prague	1–0	Mladá Boleslav	Prague
19:00 CEST (UTC+2)	Pavelka (yellow card) 43'; Dočkal (yellow card) 75'; Karabec (yellow card) 79'; Hložek 90+3'; Holec (yellow card) 90+4'	Report	Matějovský (yellow card) 42'; Jurásek (yellow card) 90+1'	Stadium: Generali Arena; Attendance: 7,544; Referee: Pavel Julínek

31 October 2021 13	Mladá Boleslav	3–2	Hradec Králové	Mladá Boleslav
15:00 CET (UTC+1)	Dancák 29'; Ewerton 45'; Šeda 78'	Report	Rada 41'; Vlkanova 51'	Stadium: Lokotrans Aréna; Attendance: 2,562; Referee: Tomáš Klíma

6 November 2021 14	České Budějovice	2–1	Mladá Boleslav	České Budějovice
15:00 CET (UTC+1)	Bassey 31'; Mršić 62'	Report	Mil. Škoda 30'	Stadium: Stadion Střelecký ostrov Attendance: 1,694; Referee: Pavel Orel

20 November 2021 15	Mladá Boleslav	1–0	Fastav Zlín	Mladá Boleslav
15:00 CET (UTC+1)	Škoda 25'	Report		Stadium: Lokotrans Aréna; Attendance: 2,022; Referee: Miroslav Zelinka

28 November 2021 16	Jablonec	0–1	Mladá Boleslav	Jablonec nad Nisou
15:00 CET (UTC+1)		Report	Hlavatý 51'	Stadium: Stadion Střelnice; Attendance: 639; Referee: Tomáš Klíma

5 December 2021 17	Mladá Boleslav	2–3	Pardubice	Mladá Boleslav
15:00 CET (UTC+1)	Ewerton 56'; Fila 90+2'	Report	Cadu 8'; Chytil 10', 18'	Stadium: Lokotrans Aréna; Attendance: 489; Referee: Pavel Orel

12 December 2021 18	Slavia Prague	2–0	Mladá Boleslav	Prague
15:00 CET (UTC+1)	Bah 31'; Stanciu 40'	Report	D. Jurásek (yellow card) 27'; Suchý (yellow card) 57'	Stadium: Sinobo Stadium; Attendance: 1,000; Referee: Petr Hocek

19 December 2021 19	Teplice	0–1	Mladá Boleslav	Teplice
15:00 CET (UTC+1)		Report	Ladra 38'	Stadium: Na Stínadlech; Attendance: 968; Referee: Tomáš Batík

6 February 2022 20	Mladá Boleslav	2–3	Baník Ostrava	Mladá Boleslav
15:00 CET (UTC+1)	Douděra (yellow card) 24'; Hlavatý 42'; Ewerton 72' (pen.)	Report	Kuzmanović 4', (yellow card) 56'; Klíma 25' (pen.), 50'; Fleišman (yellow card) 70'	Stadium: Lokotrans Aréna; Attendance: 1,000; Referee: Pavel Orel

13 February 2022 21	Sigma Olomouc	2–1	Mladá Boleslav	Olomouc
15:00 CET (UTC+1)	Greššák (yellow card) 21'; González (yellow card) 54'; Chytil 64'; Zmrzlý 79'	Report	Suchý (yellow card) 43'; Matějovský 47'; Stránský (yellow card) 80'	Stadium: Andrův stadion Attendance: 1,000; Referee: Jan Machálek

20 February 2022 22	Mladá Boleslav	3–3	Slovan Liberec	Mladá Boleslav
15:00 CET (UTC+1)	Ewerton 9', 90+2'; Hlavatý 69'	Report	Matoušek 24', 53'; Rondić 29'	Stadium: Lokotrans Aréna; Attendance: 1,674; Referee: Josef Krejsa

26 February 2022 23	Slovácko	2–1	Mladá Boleslav	Uherské Hradiště
15:00 CET (UTC+1)	Jurečka 61', 90+5' (pen.)	Report	Douděra 17'	Stadium: Městský fotbalový stadion Miroslava Valenty; Attendance: 3,791; Referee: Miroslav Zelinka

6 March 2022 24	Mladá Boleslav	1–0	Karviná	Mladá Boleslav
15:00 CET (UTC+1)	Douděra 21'	Report		Stadium: Lokotrans Aréna; Attendance: 1,832; Referee: Tomáš Klíma

12 March 2022 25	Bohemians 1905	2–2	Mladá Boleslav	Prague
15:00 CET (UTC+1)	Petrák 5'; Krch 46'	Report	Ladra 14'; Smrž 81'	Stadium: Ďolíček; Attendance: 3,856; Referee: Jan Petřík

20 March 2022 26	Mladá Boleslav	0–3	Sparta Prague	Mladá Boleslav
15:00 CET (UTC+1)	Sladký (yellow card) 60'; Horský (yellow card) 65'	Report	Čvančara 15'; Vitík 25'; Krejčí II (yellow card) 75', (goal) 90+3'	Stadium: Lokotrans Aréna; Attendance: 4,715; Referee: Petr Hocek

3 April 2022 27	Hradec Králové	2–2	Mladá Boleslav	Mladá Boleslav (Note: Hradec Králové played their home matches in Mladá Boleslav due to the rebuilding of their own Všesportovní stadion.)
16:00 CEST (UTC+2)	Vlkanova 7'; Kubala 61'	Report	Douděra 20'; Šimek 81'	Stadium: Lokotrans Aréna; Attendance: 836; Referee: Jan Machálek

10 April 2022 28	Mladá Boleslav	2–0	České Budějovice	Mladá Boleslav
16:00 CEST (UTC+2)	Ewerton 31'; Douděra 77'	Report		Stadium: Lokotrans Aréna; Attendance: 1,033; Referee: Josef Krejsa

17 April 2022 29	Fastav Zlín	1–2	Mladá Boleslav	Zlín
17:00 CEST (UTC+2)	Reiter 82'	Report	Douděra 21'; Ladra 51'	Stadium: Letná Stadion; Attendance: 2,477; Referee: Marek Radina

20 April 2022 30	Mladá Boleslav	0–2	Viktoria Plzeň	Mladá Boleslav
18:00 CEST (UTC+2)	Sladký (yellow card) 51'	Report	Havel 3', (yellow card) 35'; Kalvach (yellow card) 26'; Mosquera (yellow card) 77'; Kopic 85'	Stadium: Lokotrans Aréna; Attendance: 2,467; Referee: Dalibor Černý

==== Play-off ====
===== First round =====
24 April 2022 First leg	České Budějovice	2–3	Mladá Boleslav	České Budějovice
16:00 CEST (UTC+2)	Čavoš 19'; Tolno 73'	Report	Douděra 13', 17'; Ladra 41'	Stadium: Stadion Střelecký ostrov Attendance: 2,125; Referee: Tomáš Batík

30 April 2022 Second leg	Mladá Boleslav	1–0 (4–2 agg.)	České Budějovice	Mladá Boleslav
16:00 CEST (UTC+2)	Douděra 87'	Report		Stadium: Lokotrans Aréna; Attendance: 1,016; Referee: Lukáš Nehasil
Note: Mladá Boleslav won 4–2 on aggregate.

===== Second round =====
6 May 2022 First leg	Sigma Olomouc	1–2	Mladá Boleslav	Olomouc
17:00 CEST (UTC+2)	Zifčák 70'	Report	Pech 45+2'; Hlavatý 55'	Stadium: Andrův stadion Attendance: 2,750; Referee: Josef Krejsa

13 May 2022 Second leg	Mladá Boleslav	2–2 (4–3 agg.)	Sigma Olomouc	Mladá Boleslav
17:00 CEST (UTC+2)	Jemelka 40' (o.g.); Ewerton 85'	Report	Zmrzlý 19'; Chytil 73'	Stadium: Lokotrans Aréna; Attendance: 1,430; Referee: Pavel Orel
Note: Mladá Boleslav won 4–3 on aggregate.
