= List of Czech football transfers winter 2022–23 =

This is a list of Czech football transfers for the 2022–23 winter transfer window. Only transfers featuring Czech First League are listed.

== Czech First League ==
Note: Flags indicate national team as has been defined under FIFA eligibility rules. Players may hold more than one non-FIFA nationality.

=== Viktoria Plzeň ===
In:

No.	Pos.	Nation	Player
1	GK	CZE	Adam Zadražil (on loan from Silon Táborsko)
11	FW	CZE	Matěj Vydra (free agent)
17	FW	NGA	Rafiu Durosinmi (on loan from Karviná)
19	MF	CZE	Roman Květ (from Bohemians 1905)
44	DF	CZE	Libor Holík (from Jablonec, previously on loan)

Out:

No.	Pos.	Nation	Player
3	DF	BEN	Mohamed Tijani (on loan to Zbrojovka Brno)
16	GK	CZE	Martin Jedlička (on loan to Bohemians 1905)
25	MF	CZE	Aleš Čermák (on loan to Bohemians 1905)
33	FW	CZE	René Dedič (loan return to Třinec)
90	FW	NGA	Fortune Bassey (loan return to (Hungary) Ferencváros)
—	DF	CZE	Josef Koželuh (on loan to Zbrojovka Brno, previously on loan at Chrudim)

=== Slavia Prague ===
In:

No.	Pos.	Nation	Player
5	DF	NGA	Igoh Ogbu (from (Norway) Lillestrøm)
10	MF	NOR	Christos Zafeiris (from (Norway) Haugesund)
20	MF	CZE	David Pech (from Mladá Boleslav)
24	MF	CZE	Petr Hronek (from Bohemians 1905)
—	DF	SVK	Michal Tomič (from Slovácko)
—	FW	SEN	Babacar Sy (from Silon Táborsko)

Out:

No.	Pos.	Nation	Player
5	MF	CIV	Christ Tiéhi (loan return to Slovan Liberec)
16	FW	NGA	Moses Usor (on loan to (Austria) LASK)
20	MF	NGA	Yira Sor (to (Belgium) Genk)
31	GK	CZE	Přemysl Kovář (retired)
—	DF	SVK	Michal Tomič (on loan to Mladá Boleslav)
—	FW	SEN	Babacar Sy (on loan to Teplice)
—	DF	CZE	Denis Halinský (reloan to Vlašim)
—	DF	UKR	Maksym Talovyerov (on loan to (Austria) LASK, previously on loan at Slovan Liberec)
—	MF	CZE	Jan Matoušek (on loan to Bohemians 1905, previously on loan at Slovan Liberec)
—	DF	CZE	Ondřej Karafiát (to Mladá Boleslav, previously on loan)

=== Sparta Prague ===
In:

No.	Pos.	Nation	Player
5	DF	SRB	Dimitrije Kamenović (on loan from (Italy) Lazio)
6	MF	FIN	Kaan Kairinen (from (Norway) Lillestrøm)
20	MF	ALB	Qazim Laçi (from (France) Ajaccio)
45	FW	AUS	Awer Mabil (on loan from (Spain) Cádiz)

Out:

No.	Pos.	Nation	Player
16	MF	CZE	Michal Sáček (to (Poland) Jagiellonia Białystok)
26	MF	CZE	Jan Fortelný (on loan to Sigma Olomouc)
32	DF	NOR	Andreas Vindheim (on loan to (Norway) Lillestrøm)
39	FW	CZE	Lukáš Juliš (to (Spain) Ibiza)
48	DF	CZE	Martin Suchomel (on loan to Mladá Boleslav)
77	GK	SVK	Dominik Holec (on loan to (Poland) Lech Poznań)
—	GK	ROU	Florin Niță (on loan to Pardubice)
—	GK	CZE	Hugo Jan Bačkovský (on loan to Slovan Liberec, previously on loan at Bohemians 1905)
—	DF	CZE	Matěj Hanousek (on loan to (Turkey) Ankaragücü, previously on loan at (Turkey) Gaziantep)

=== Slovácko ===
In:

No.	Pos.	Nation	Player
18	MF	KOR	Seung-Bin Kim (from Dukla Prague)

Out:

No.	Pos.	Nation	Player
18	FW	CZE	Libor Kozák (to Trinity Zlín)
27	DF	SVK	Michal Tomič (to Slavia Prague)
—	FW	RUS	Timur Melekestsev (to (Belarus) Energetik-BGU)

=== Baník Ostrava ===
In:

No.	Pos.	Nation	Player
10	MF	CZE	Matěj Šín (free agent)
96	DF	ALB	Eneo Bitri (from (Albania) Partizani Tirana)

Out:

No.	Pos.	Nation	Player
77	DF	ANG	Gigli Ndefe (on loan to Slovan Liberec)
—	MF	CZE	Ondřej Chvěja (on loan to Prostějov, previously on loan at Pardubice)
—	DF	CZE	Jan Kubala (retired, previously on loan at Vyškov)

=== Hradec Králové ===
In:

No.	Pos.	Nation	Player
4	MF	CZE	Petr Pudhorocký (from Sparta Prague B)

Out:

No.	Pos.	Nation	Player
4	DF	CZE	Otto Urma (free agent)
7	FW	CZE	Petr Rybička (on loan to Opava)
28	MF	CZE	David Doležal (on loan to Chlumec nad Cidlinou)
—	MF	CZE	Jiří Kateřiňák (to Silon Táborsko, previously on loan at Třinec)

=== Mladá Boleslav ===
In:

No.	Pos.	Nation	Player
2	DF	CZE	Martin Suchomel (on loan from Sparta Prague)
5	DF	SVK	Michal Tomič (on loan from Slavia Prague)
23	FW	CZE	Vasil Kušej (from Prostějov)
30	MF	CZE	Daniel Mareček (from Bohemians 1905, previously on loan)
32	FW	GAM	Lamin Jawo (from Trinity Zlín)
44	DF	CZE	Ondřej Karafiát (from Slavia Prague, previously on loan)

Out:

No.	Pos.	Nation	Player
1	GK	SVK	Martin Polaček (to (Slovakia) Liptovský Mikuláš)
24	FW	CZE	Ladislav Krobot (on loan to Pardubice)
25	MF	CZE	Denis Darmovzal (on loan to Pardubice)
26	MF	CZE	David Pech (to Slavia Prague)
—	DF	CZE	Kryštof Obadal (on loan to (Slovakia) Pohronie, previously on loan at Třinec)
—	MF	CZE	Daniel Langhamer (on loan to Příbram, previously on loan at Vlašim)
—	MF	CZE	Martin Rolinek (to Prostějov, previously on loan at Karviná)

=== Slovan Liberec ===
In:

No.	Pos.	Nation	Player
21	FW	NGA	Victor Olatunji (on loan from (Cyprus) AEK Larnaca)
28	DF	ANG	Gigli Ndefe (on loan from Baník Ostrava)
29	FW	SVK	Ľubomír Tupta (on loan from (Italy) Pescara)
31	GK	CZE	Hugo Jan Bačkovský (on loan from Sparta Prague, previously on loan at Bohemians 1905)

Out:

No.	Pos.	Nation	Player
4	DF	UKR	Maksym Talovyerov (loan return to Slavia Prague)
14	FW	NED	Mick van Buren (loan return to Slavia Prague)
17	MF	CZE	Jan Matoušek (loan return to Slavia Prague)
29	MF	GUI	Kamso Mara (free agent)
31	GK	CZE	Jan Stejskal (loan return to Slavia Prague)
—	MF	CIV	Christ Tiéhi (on loan to (England) Wigan, previously on loan at Slavia Prague)

=== Sigma Olomouc ===
In:

No.	Pos.	Nation	Player
26	MF	CZE	Martin Pospíšil (from (Poland) Jagiellonia Białystok)
40	MF	CZE	Jan Fortelný (on loan from Sparta Prague)
44	FW	CZE	Jakub Přichystal (from Zbrojovka Brno)
—	MF	NGA	Dele Israel (from (Latvia) Daugavpils)
—	FW	CZE	Denis Kramář (from Opava)

Out:

No.	Pos.	Nation	Player
12	MF	CZE	Jan Sedlák (to (Poland) Ruch Chorzów)
23	MF	SVK	Martin Košťál (to (Poland) Sandecja Nowy Sącz)

=== České Budějovice ===
In:

No.	Pos.	Nation	Player
7	FW	NGA	Quadri Adediran (from Dukla Prague)
16	MF	CZE	Marcel Čermák (from Příbram)
21	MF	SVK	Lukáš Čmelík (from Karviná, previously on loan)

Out:

No.	Pos.	Nation	Player
7	FW	SVK	Jakub Švec (on loan to (Slovakia) Skalica)
33	GK	CZE	Matěj Luksch (on loan to (Slovakia) Podbrezová)

=== Pardubice ===
In:

No.	Pos.	Nation	Player
1	GK	ROU	Florin Niță (on loan from Sparta Prague)
10	MF	POL	Bartosz Pikul (from Opava)
15	MF	CZE	Denis Darmovzal (on loan from Mladá Boleslav)
17	FW	CZE	Ladislav Krobot (on loan from Mladá Boleslav)

Out:

No.	Pos.	Nation	Player
4	DF	CZE	Jan Halász (on loan to Chrudim)
8	MF	CZE	Ondřej Chvěja (loan return to Baník Ostrava)
15	DF	CZE	Václav Svoboda (to Chrudim)
17	DF	CZE	Petr Kurka (on loan to Varnsdorf)
25	FW	USA	Nana Akosah-Bempah (to (Israel) Hapoel Acre)

=== Trinity Zlín ===
In:

No.	Pos.	Nation	Player
20	FW	CZE	Libor Kozák (from Slovácko)
45	FW	SVK	Filip Balaj (on loan from (Poland) Cracovia)
81	DF	CZE	Michal Jeřábek (from (Slovakia) Michalovce)

Out:

No.	Pos.	Nation	Player
10	FW	GAM	Lamin Jawo (to Mladá Boleslav)

=== Jablonec ===
In:

No.	Pos.	Nation	Player
32	DF	CZE	Jan Král (on loan from (Belgium) Eupen)

Out:

No.	Pos.	Nation	Player
11	DF	MAS	Dion Cools (to (Thailand) Buriram United)
24	MF	CZE	Dominik Pleštil (on loan to Teplice)
—	DF	CZE	Libor Holík (to Viktoria Plzeň, previously on loan)

=== Bohemians 1905 ===
In:

No.	Pos.	Nation	Player
2	DF	CZE	Jan Shejbal (from Teplice)
7	MF	CZE	Aleš Čermák (on loan from Viktoria Plzeň)
10	MF	CZE	Jan Matoušek (on loan from Slavia Prague, previously on loan at Slovan Liberec)
22	DF	CZE	Jan Vondra (free agent)
36	GK	CZE	Martin Jedlička (on loan from Viktoria Plzeň)

Out:

No.	Pos.	Nation	Player
3	DF	SRB	Stefan Vilotić (on loan to Vlašim)
7	MF	CZE	Petr Hronek (to Slavia Prague)
9	FW	FRA	Ibrahim Keita (to (Republic of Ireland) Galway United)
15	DF	CZE	Daniel Krch (to Dukla Prague)
19	MF	CZE	Roman Květ (to Viktoria Plzeň)
99	GK	CZE	Hugo Jan Bačkovský (loan return to Sparta Prague)
—	MF	CZE	Daniel Mareček (to Mladá Boleslav, previously on loan)
—	FW	CZE	Pavel Osmančík (on loan to Varnsdorf, previously on loan at Příbram)

=== Teplice ===
In:

No.	Pos.	Nation	Player
10	FW	SEN	Babacar Sy (on loan from Slavia Prague)
18	DF	SRB	Nemanja Mićević (from (Argentina) Talleres)
29	MF	CZE	Dominik Pleštil (on loan from Jablonec)

Out:

No.	Pos.	Nation	Player
10	MF	CZE	Jakub Křišťan (on loan to Vlašim)
18	FW	SVK	Roman Čerepkai (on loan to (Slovakia) Zlaté Moravce)
22	DF	CZE	Jan Shejbal (to Bohemians 1905)
32	MF	UKR	Yegor Tsykalo (on loan to Opava)
—	FW	CZE	David Ledecký (to Znojmo, previously on loan at Silon Táborsko)

=== Zbrojovka Brno ===
In:

No.	Pos.	Nation	Player
3	DF	BEN	Mohamed Tijani (on loan from Viktoria Plzeň)
35	DF	CZE	Josef Koželuh (on loan from Viktoria Plzeň, previously on loan at Chrudim)

Out:

No.	Pos.	Nation	Player
14	FW	CZE	Jakub Přichystal (to Sigma Olomouc)

== See also ==
- 2022–23 Czech First League
