= John Solomon =

John Solomon may refer to:

== Sports ==
- John Solomon (Australian footballer) (1928–2011), Australian rules footballer for St Kilda
- John Solomon (croquet player) (1931–2014), croquet player from England
- John Solomon (rower) (1903–1981), New Zealand Olympian
- John Solomon (rugby union) (1929–2020), Australia international rugby union captain
- Solomon John, also called John Solomon (born 2001), Nigerian footballer

== Others ==
- John Solomon (Canadian politician) (born 1950), Canadian politician and public servant
- John Solomon (political commentator) (active 1987 to present), American journalist and media executive
- John Solomon (writer) (born 1970), American comedian and comedy writer
- John R. Solomon (1910–1985), Canadian Liberal-Progressive politician

== See also ==
- Jon Solomon, DJ
- Jack Solomon, American sound engineer
