= Dušan Uhrin Jr. =

Czech footballer and manager

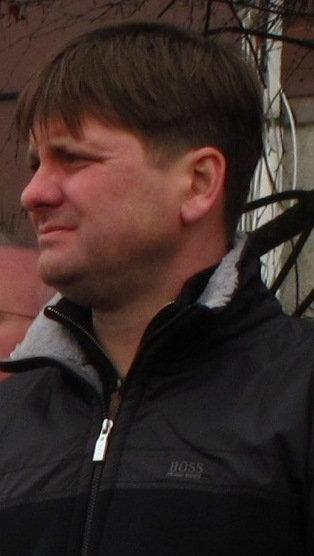

Personal information
- Date of birth: 11 October 1967 (age 59)
- Place of birth: Prague, Czechoslovakia
- Height: 1.83 m (6 ft 0 in)

Youth career
- 1974–1975: Meteor Prague
- 1975–1984: Bohemians Prague

Senior career*
Years	Team	Apps	(Gls)
1984–1986	Meteor Prague		
1986–1988	Montáže Prague		
1988–1990	FC Jílové		
1990–1992	RH Strašnice		

Managerial career
- 1990–1992: RH Strašnice (player-manager)
- 1992–1994: PSK Union Praha
- 1994–1997: Slavoj Vyšehrad
- 1997–1998: Sparta Prague B
- 1998–1999: Tatran Poštorná
- 1999: Slavia Prague (youth)
- 1999–2001: Slavia Prague (assistant)
- 2002–2004: Bohemians Prague
- 2004–2007: Mladá Boleslav
- 2007–2008: Politehnica Timişoara
- 2009: CFR Cluj
- 2009: Mladá Boleslav
- 2010: AEL Limassol
- 2010–2011: Politehnica Timişoara
- 2012–2013: Dinamo Tbilisi
- 2013–2014: Viktoria Plzeň
- 2014–2015: Dinamo Minsk
- 2015–2016: Slavia Prague
- 2017: Mladá Boleslav (technical director)
- 2017–2018: Mladá Boleslav
- 2019–2020: Dinamo București
- 2020: Gaz Metan Mediaș
- 2021: Dinamo București
- 2022: Dinamo București
- 2022: Karmiotissa
- 2022–2023: Příbram
- 2024: Zlaté Moravce
- * Club domestic league appearances and goals

Dušan Uhrin Jr. (born 11 October 1967) is a Czech professional football manager and former player. He is the son of Dušan Uhrin senior who was also a football manager.

== Playing career ==
Dušan Uhrin Jr. played in his youth at Meteor Prague and Bohemians Prague. He started his senior career at Meteor in 1984, before moving to Montáže Prag and subsequently FC Jílové. While at the latter, Uhrin suffered a severe injury and decided to concentrate on a coaching career. Between 1990 and 1991 he stepped up into the role of player/manager at RH Strašnice, but afterwards only kept on playing on occasion for FC Jílové until 1998, when he retired altogether from his playing career.

== Managing career ==
Although Uhrin first managed RH Strašnice in 1990, his first real major team in 2000, when he co-coached Slavia Prague.

=== Politehnica Timișoara and return ===
In the first year at Timișoara, Uhrin achieved qualification to the UEFA Cup, thereby marking the first European presence of a Timișoara team since 1992.

On 13 December 2010, Dušan was announced the new Politehnica Timişoara's Head Coach signed for one year with option to renewal for two years. After his come back he spoke for official site : "I hope the stadium will be full again! But, above all, I promise to our fans that we play good attacking football. We hope to bring out the best place possible. I want to have the same relationship with the fans from the last time, because Poli's supporters were wonderful. I'm glad that we have again the colors that he had a team since I started coaching in 2007. These are Poli's true colors!". Uhrin made an impressive re-debut by winning all of the first four matches. But after that series of victories Poli unluckily gained only one victory in the following six games. Although Poli finished second at the end of the 2010–11 Liga I season and was supposed to play in the 2011–12 UEFA Champions League, it was relegated to the Liga II because of accumulated debt and Dušan Uhrin left Poli on 27 July 2011.

=== Dinamo Tbilisi ===
In June 2012, he signed a contract with Dinamo Tbilisi for two years. During his first year, Dinamo managed to win Georgian Championship for the first time after 2008. He resigned on 6 December 2013, and will return to the Czech Republic to manage FC Viktoria Plzeň in 2014.

=== Zlaté Moravce ===
On 26 February 2024, Uhrin was appointed as manager of Slovak club Zlaté Moravce.

== Managerial statistics ==
As of match played 18 May 2024

Managerial record by team and tenure
Team	From	To	Record						
Team	From	To	G	W	D	L	GF	GA	Win %
(Czech Republic) Slavoj Vyšehrad	1 July 1994	30 June 1997	90	48	19	23	190	113	53.33
(Czech Republic) Sparta Prague B	1 July 1997	30 June 1998	34	15	11	8	50	32	44.12
(Czech Republic) Tatran Poštorná	1 July 1998	30 June 1999	32	10	7	15	37	46	31.25
(Czech Republic) Bohemians Prague	25 June 2002	18 October 2004	66	16	18	32	76	58	24.24
(Czech Republic) Mladá Boleslav	19 October 2004	28 May 2007	95	42	29	24	141	105	44.21
(Romania) Politehnica Timişoara	11 June 2007	2 December 2008	57	29	15	13	96	68	50.88
(Romania) CFR Cluj	1 March 2009	7 April 2009	6	4	1	1	7	4	66.67
(Czech Republic) Mladá Boleslav	1 July 2009	26 December 2009	17	7	4	6	28	22	41.18
(Cyprus) AEL Limassol	1 January 2010	21 September 2010	21	12	4	5	38	25	57.14
(Romania) Politehnica Timişoara	13 December 2010	27 July 2011	16	9	5	2	33	17	56.25
(Georgia (country)) Dinamo Tbilisi	1 June 2012	6 December 2013	64	46	11	7	180	54	71.88
(Czech Republic) Viktoria Plzeň	17 December 2013	11 August 2014	30	15	9	6	54	32	50.00
(Belarus) Dinamo Minsk	19 December 2014	30 April 2015	7	1	3	3	6	9	14.29
(Czech Republic) Slavia Prague	16 May 2015	29 August 2016	42	17	14	11	68	46	40.48
(Czech Republic) Mladá Boleslav	13 June 2017	24 February 2018	24	10	2	12	36	42	41.67
(Romania) Dinamo București	13 August 2019	10 March 2020	26	12	4	10	41	32	46.15
(Romania) Gaz Metan Mediaș	9 June 2020	24 September 2020	12	2	2	8	12	23	16.67
(Romania) Dinamo București	14 April 2021	10 July 2021	11	6	2	3	12	10	54.55
(Cyprus) Karmiotissa	1 July 2022	3 September 2022	2	0	0	2	1	6	0.00
(Czech Republic) Příbram	30 November 2022	25 April 2023	7	3	0	4	9	10	42.86
(Slovakia) Zlaté Moravce	16 March 2024	30 June 2024	11	2	2	7	8	22	18.18
Total			670	306	162	202	1,123	776	45.67

== Honours ==
Slavoj Vyšehrad

- Prague Championship: 1994–95

Mladá Boleslav

- Czech First League runner-up: 2005–06
- Czech 2. Liga: 2003–04

CFR Cluj

- Cupa Romaniei: 2008–09
- Supercupa Romaniei: 2009

Politehnica Timisoara

- Liga I runner-up: 2010–11

Dinamo Tbilisi

- Umaglesi Liga: 2012–13
- Georgian Cup: 2012–13

Viktoria Plzen

- Czech First League runner-up: 2013–14
- Czech Cup runner-up: 2013–14

Dinamo Minsk

- Belarusian Premier League runner-up: 2014, 2015
