= Martin Suchomel =

Czech footballer (born 2002)

Personal information
- Date of birth: 11 September 2002 (age 24)
- Place of birth: Prague, Czech Republic
- Height: 1.83 m (6 ft 0 in)
- Position: Left-back

Team information
- Current team: Sparta Prague

Youth career
- 2009–2021: Sparta Prague

Senior career*
Years	Team	Apps	(Gls)
2021–2022	Sparta Prague B	27	(1)
2022–	Sparta Prague	30	(1)
2023–2024	→ Mladá Boleslav (loan)	34	(2)
2026	→ Hradec Králové (loan)	9	(2)

International career^{‡}
2019	Czech Republic U17	2	(0)
2019	Czech Republic U18	3	(0)
2021–2023	Czech Republic U20	10	(0)
2022–	Czech Republic U21	9	(0)
- * Club domestic league appearances and goals as of 27 May 2026 ‡ National team caps and goals as of 21:05, 23 January 2025 (UTC)

Martin Suchomel (born 11 September 2002) is a Czech professional footballer who plays for Sparta Prague as a left-back.

== Career ==
Suchomel is a youth product of Sparta Prague, and worked his way up their youth categories before signing his first professional with the senior squad on 1 December 2021 He made his senior and professional debut with Sparta Prague as a substitute in a 2–0 Czech Cup win over Slavia Prague on 9 February 2022. On 11 June 2022, he extended his professional contract with the club. On 6 July 2023, he signed on loan with Mladá Boleslav.

On 11 February 2026, Suchomel joined Hradec Králové on a half-year loan deal.

== International career ==
Suchomel is a youth international for the Czech Republic. He was called up to the Czech Republic U21s for a set of 2025 UEFA European Under-21 Championship qualification matches in November 2024.

== Career statistics ==
=== Club ===
As of match played 1 March 2025

Appearances and goals by club, season and competition
Club	Season	League			Cup		Europe		Other		Total	
Club	Season	Division	Apps	Goals	Apps	Goals	Apps	Goals	Apps	Goals	Apps	Goals
Sparta Prague B	2021–22	Czech National Football League	16	1	—		—		—		16	1
Sparta Prague B	2022–23	Czech National Football League	11	0	—		—		—		11	0
Sparta Prague B	Total		27	1	—		—		—		27	1
Sparta Prague	2021–22	Czech First League	3	0	2	0	1 (Note: Appearance in UEFA Conference League)	0	—		6	0
Sparta Prague	2024–25	Czech First League	13	0	1	0	4 (Note: Appearances in UEFA Champions League)	0	—		18	0
Sparta Prague	Total		16	0	3	0	5	0	0	0	24	0
Mladá Boleslav (loan)	2022–23	Czech First League	13	0	0	0	—		—		13	0
Mladá Boleslav (loan)	2023–24	Czech First League	21	2	2	0	—		—		23	2
Mladá Boleslav (loan)	Total		34	2	2	0	—		—		36	2
Career total			77	3	5	0	5	0	0	0	87	3
