= Miroslav Miller =

Czech footballer

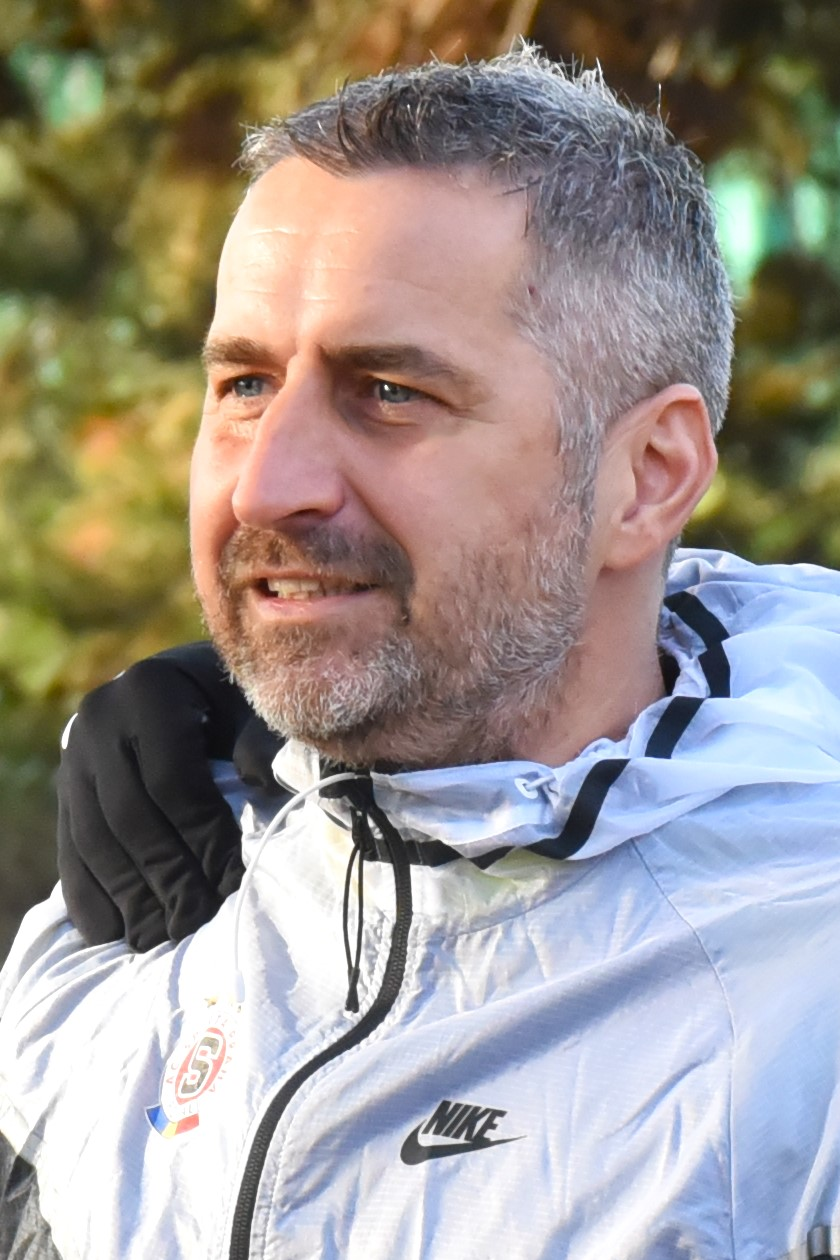

Personal information
- Date of birth: 19 August 1980 (age 46)
- Place of birth: Beroun, Czechoslovakia
- Height: 1.91 m (6 ft 3 in)
- Position: Goalkeeper

Team information
- Current team: Bohemians 1905 (Goalkeeper coach)

Senior career*
Years	Team	Apps	(Gls)
- TJ Sokol Jinočany
- FK Rudná
- Bohemians Prague
2000–2017	FK Mladá Boleslav	211	(0)
2015–2017	→ AC Sparta Prague (loan)	1	(0)
- * Club domestic league appearances and goals as of 13 June 2017

Miroslav Miller (born 19 August 1980) is a retired Czech goalkeeper lastly played for AC Sparta Prague.
