= Tomáš Ladra =

Czech footballer

Personal information
- Date of birth: 24 April 1997 (age 29)
- Place of birth: Česká Lípa, Czech Republic
- Height: 1.78 m (5 ft 10 in)
- Position: Winger

Team information
- Current team: Viktoria Plzeň
- Number: 18

Youth career
- Mladá Boleslav

Senior career*
Years	Team	Apps	(Gls)
2016–2025	Mladá Boleslav	223	(32)
2016–2017	→ Pardubice (loan)	42	(5)
2020	→ Jablonec (loan)	13	(2)
2025–	Viktoria Plzeň	36	(5)

International career^{‡}
2014–2015	Czech Republic U18	11	(2)
2015–2016	Czech Republic U19	17	(2)
2016–2017	Czech Republic U20	9	(2)
2017–2018	Czech Republic U21	7	(1)
2025–	Czech Republic	2	(1)
- * Club domestic league appearances and goals as of 31 August 2026 ‡ National team caps and goals as of 31 May 2026

Tomáš Ladra (born 24 April 1997) is a Czech professional footballer who plays as a midfielder for Viktoria Plzeň and the Czech Republic national team. He spent most of his career in Mladá Boleslav. With 223 caps for Mladá Boleslav and 32 goals, he is among the most notable players of the club's history.

== Life ==
Tomáš Ladra was born on born 24 April 1997 in Česká Lípa. He was raised in FK Mladá Boleslav.

== Club career ==
Before the 2016–17 season, at the age of 19, Ladra was sent on loan to FK Pardubice. He made his senior league debut for Pardubice on 7 August 2016 in their Czech National Football League 3–0 away loss against FK Varnsdorf. His first match for FK Mladá Boleslav in the Czech First League was on 17 February 2018 against MFK Karviná.

Since his return from Pardubice, Ladra played for Mladá Boleslav, with the exception of a six-month loan spell at FK Jablonec in 2020. In 2024, he received an offer from richer Czech clubs, but for family reasons he decided to stay at FK Mladá Boleslav and sign a contract for another three years. After the 2024–25 season, he had 223 league caps for Mladá Boleslav (2nd most in club history) and scored 32 goals (6th most in club history).

In June 2025, Ladra transferred to Viktoria Plzeň.

== Career statistics ==
=== Club ===
As of match played 17 May 2026

Appearances and goals by club, season and competition
Club	Season	League			Cup		Europe		Other		Total	
Club	Season	Division	Apps	Goals	Apps	Goals	Apps	Goals	Apps	Goals	Apps	Goals
Mladá Boleslav	2015–16	Czech First League	1	0	0	0	—		—		1	0
Mladá Boleslav	2017–18	Czech First League	14	0	2	0	—		—		16	0
Mladá Boleslav	2018–19	Czech First League	30	5	2	0	—		—		32	5
Mladá Boleslav	2019–20	Czech First League	31	3	3	1	4 (Note: Appearance(s) in UEFA Europa League)	0	—		38	4
Mladá Boleslav	2020–21	Czech First League	16	4	2	1	—		—		18	5
Mladá Boleslav	2021–22	Czech First League	33	4	3	0	—		—		36	4
Mladá Boleslav	2022–23	Czech First League	32	7	2	1	—		—		34	8
Mladá Boleslav	2023–24	Czech First League	34	5	3	0	—		—		37	5
Mladá Boleslav	2024–25	Czech First League	32	4	1	0	12 (Note: Appearance(s) in UEFA Conference League)	4	—		45	8
Mladá Boleslav	Total		223	32	18	3	16	4	—		257	39
Pardubice (loan)	2016–17	Czech National Football League	29	2	3	1	—		—		32	3
Pardubice (loan)	2017–18	Czech National Football League	13	3	0	0	—		—		13	3
Pardubice (loan)	Total		42	5	3	1	—		—		45	6
Jablonec (loan)	2020–21	Czech First League	13	2	0	0	1	0	—		14	2
Viktoria Plzeň	2025–26	Czech First League	32	4	3	1	13 (Note: Three appearances in UEFA Champions League, ten appearances and one goal in UEFA Europa League)	1	—		48	6
Career total			310	43	24	5	30	5	0	0	364	53

=== International ===
As of match played 31 May 2026

Appearances and goals by national team and year
National team	Year	Apps	Goals
Czech Republic	2025	1	0
Czech Republic	2026	1	1
Total		2	1

Scores and results list the Czech Republic's goal tally first, score column indicates score after each Ladra goal.

List of international goals scored by Tomáš Ladra
No.	Date	Venue	Opponent	Score	Result	Competition
1	31 May 2026	Stadion Letná, Prague, Czech Republic	Kosovo	1–0	2–1	Friendly

== International career ==
Ladra played for all Czech Republic youth national teams U18–U21 and played a total of 44 matches in them.
