= 2005–06 Czech First League =

13th season of top-tier football league in Czech Republic

Czech First League
- Season: 2005–06
- Champions: Slovan Liberec
- Relegated: Jihlava; Blšany
- Champions League: Slovan Liberec; Mladá Boleslav
- UEFA Cup: Slavia Prague; Sparta Prague (via Domestic Cup)
- Intertoto Cup: Teplice
- Matches: 240
- Goals: 567 (2.36 per match)
- Top goalscorer: Milan Ivana (11)
- Biggest home win: Ostrava 6–0 Plzeň
- Biggest away win: Jihlava 0–4 Teplice
- Highest scoring: Olomouc 4–3 Slavia Prague; Sparta Prague 5–2 Blšany; Teplice 4–3 Most
- Highest attendance: 20,318; Sparta Prague 1–0 Slavia Prague
- Lowest attendance: 1,620; Jihlava 0–0 Brno
- Average attendance: 4,085

The 2005–06 Czech First League, known as the Gambrinus liga for sponsorship reasons, was the thirteenth season of top-tier football in the Czech Republic.

== Stadia and locations ==
Location of clubs in the 2005–06 Czech First League

== League table ==
Pos	Team	Pld	W	D	L	GF	GA	GD	Pts	Qualification or relegation
1	Slovan Liberec (C)	30	16	11	3	43	22	+21	59	Qualification for Champions League third qualifying round
2	Mladá Boleslav	30	16	6	8	50	36	+14	54 (Note: Mladá Boleslav ahead of Slavia Prague on head-to-head record; Mladá Boleslav–Slavia Prague 4–1, Slavia Prague–Mladá Boleslav 2–1.)	Qualification for Champions League second qualifying round
3	Slavia Prague	30	15	9	6	56	34	+22	54	Qualification for UEFA Cup second qualifying round
4	Teplice	30	12	16	2	38	24	+14	52	Qualification for Intertoto Cup second round
5	Sparta Prague	30	13	6	11	43	39	+4	45	Qualification for UEFA Cup first round (Note: Sparta Prague won the 2005–06 Czech Cup and qualified for the first round of the UEFA Cup.)
6	Baník Ostrava	30	10	10	10	35	32	+3	40	
7	Slovácko	30	9	11	10	29	28	+1	38	
8	Jablonec	30	10	7	13	35	39	−4	37 (Note: Jablonec ahead of Sigma Olomouc on head-to-head record; Jablonec–Sigma Olomouc 1–2, Sigma Olomouc–Jablonec 0–2.)	
9	Sigma Olomouc	30	10	7	13	34	44	−10	37	
10	Most	30	10	6	14	34	41	−7	36	
11	Tescoma Zlín	30	8	11	11	27	33	−6	35 (Note: Tescoma Zlín ahead of Brno on head-to-head record; Tescoma Zlín–Brno 2–0, Brno–Tescoma Zlín 1–1.)	
12	Brno	30	7	14	9	35	36	−1	35	
13	Marila Příbram	30	8	10	12	36	36	0	34	
14	Viktoria Plzeň	30	7	10	13	30	43	−13	31	
15	Vysočina Jihlava (R)	30	6	11	13	20	36	−16	29	Relegation to Czech 2. Liga
16	Blšany (R)	30	5	11	14	22	44	−22	26	Relegation to Czech 2. Liga

Source: Fortuna liga
Rules for classification: 1) points; 2) head-to-head points; 3) head-to-head goal difference; 4) head-to-head goals scored; 5) goal difference; 6) number of goals scored.
(C) Champions; (R) Relegated

== Results ==
Home \ Away	OST	BLŠ	BRN	JAB	PŘÍ	MBO	MOS	OLO	SLA	SLO	LIB	SPA	TEP	ZLÍ	PLZ	JIH
Baník Ostrava		0–0	1–1	2–1	0–1	1–3	0–0	4–1	1–3	2–0	1–1	0–2	0–0	4–1	6–0	1–0
Blšany	1–1		2–2	1–0	1–0	1–0	0–1	0–2	1–3	1–1	0–0	0–0	0–0	3–2	0–3	2–2
Brno	1–1	1–0		1–1	1–0	4–2	1–0	1–1	1–0	0–0	0–1	1–1	1–2	1–1	3–1	1–2
Jablonec	1–2	2–0	0–2		3–1	1–1	3–0	1–2	0–2	2–1	1–0	2–1	0–0	2–0	3–1	0–0
Marila Příbram	2–2	1–1	2–1	2–2		1–2	1–0	3–0	2–2	1–1	2–2	2–2	1–1	3–0	2–0	2–0
Mladá Boleslav	2–1	4–1	2–1	2–1	0–0		1–0	2–0	4–1	1–0	2–4	2–0	0–2	2–0	2–2	4–0
Most	4–0	3–1	3–3	3–0	1–0	1–0		0–2	0–3	3–2	1–2	0–3	2–1	0–0	1–0	2–1
Sigma Olomouc	1–0	3–2	3–2	0–2	2–1	2–3	1–1		4–3	1–1	1–0	1–2	0–0	0–0	1–1	1–2
Slavia Prague	4–0	0–0	3–1	3–2	1–0	2–1	3–0	2–1		2–0	1–3	4–1	1–1	1–0	1–1	1–1
Slovácko	0–0	2–0	1–1	1–0	2–0	1–1	2–1	2–2	0–0		1–2	2–0	1–1	2–0	1–0	1–0
Slovan Liberec	1–0	2–0	0–0	2–0	1–0	2–3	1–1	2–0	3–3	2–1		2–0	1–1	1–0	2–0	0–0
Sparta Prague	0–2	5–2	1–1	3–0	1–1	4–2	2–1	1–2	2–1	1–0	1–2		0–0	1–0	1–3	2–0
Teplice	0–2	2–1	1–1	1–1	2–1	1–1	4–3	1–0	1–0	0–0	0–0	2–1		2–1	2–1	3–1
Tescoma Zlín	1–0	0–1	2–0	3–1	1–0	2–0	1–1	1–0	2–2	3–1	1–1	3–2	0–0		0–0	1–1
Viktoria Plzeň	0–0	2–0	2–1	1–2	2–1	0–1	2–1	1–0	1–1	0–2	1–1	1–2	3–3	1–1		0–0
Vysočina Jihlava	0–1	0–0	0–0	1–1	2–3	0–0	1–0	3–0	0–3	1–0	0–2	0–1	0–4	0–0	2–0	

Source: Fortuna liga
Legend: Blue = home team win; Yellow = draw; Red = away team win.

== Top goalscorers ==
Rank	Player	Club	Goals
1	(Slovakia) Milan Ivana	Slovácko	11
2	(Czech Republic) Marek Kulič	Mladá Boleslav	10
2	(Czech Republic) Karel Piták	Slavia Prague	10
2	(Czech Republic) Stanislav Vlček	Slavia Prague	10
5	(Czech Republic) Horst Siegl	Most	9
6	(Czech Republic) Luboš Pecka	Mladá Boleslav	8
6	(Czech Republic) Adam Varadi	Baník Ostrava	8
6	(Czech Republic) Rudolf Otepka	Marila Příbram	8
6	(Czech Republic) Libor Došek	Sparta Prague	8

== Attendances ==
#	Club	Average
1	Sparta Praha	7,211
2	Slovan Liberec	5,582
3	Most	5,402
4	Teplice	5,132
5	Slovácko	4,980
6	Baník Ostrava	4,650
7	Mladá Boleslav	4,621
8	Sigma Olomouc	4,507
9	Viktoria Plzeň	4,118
10	Slavia Praha	3,836
11	Příbram	3,471
12	Jablonec	2,947
13	Zbrojovka Brno	2,783
14	Zlín	2,434
15	Vysočina Jihlava	2,036
16	Blšany	1,742

== See also ==
- 2005–06 Czech Cup
- 2005–06 Czech 2. Liga
