= 2004–05 Czech First League =

12th season of top-tier football league in Czech Republic

Czech First League
- Season: 2004–05
- Champions: Sparta Prague
- Relegated: Drnovice; Dynamo České Budějovice; Opava
- Champions League: Sparta Prague; Slavia Prague
- UEFA Cup: Teplice; Baník Ostrava (via Domestic Cup)
- Intertoto Cup: Olomouc; Liberec; Zlín
- Matches: 240
- Goals: 531 (2.21 per match)
- Top goalscorer: Tomáš Jun (14)
- Biggest home win: Sparta Prague 5–1 Opava; Slavia Prague 5–1 Příbram; Liberec 4–0 Teplice; Mladá Boleslav 4–0 Brno; Ostrava 4–0 Olomouc
- Biggest away win: Ostrava 0–4 Liberec
- Highest scoring: Teplice 5–2 České Budějovice
- Highest attendance: 15,419; Ostrava 1–0 Sparta Prague
- Lowest attendance: 100; Opava 2–1 Mladá Boleslav
- Average attendance: 3,840

The 2004–05 Czech First League, known as the Gambrinus liga for sponsorship reasons, was the twelfth season of top-tier football in the Czech Republic.

== Stadia and locations ==
Location of clubs in the 2004–05 Czech First League

== League table ==
Pos	Team	Pld	W	D	L	GF	GA	GD	Pts	Qualification or relegation
1	Sparta Prague (C)	30	20	4	6	53	28	+25	64	Qualification for Champions League group stage
2	Slavia Prague	30	15	8	7	39	25	+14	53	Qualification for Champions League third qualifying round
3	Teplice	30	14	11	5	36	27	+9	53	Qualification for UEFA Cup second qualifying round
4	Sigma Olomouc	30	15	6	9	39	34	+5	51	Qualification for Intertoto Cup second round
5	Slovan Liberec (Note: Six points were taken off from Slovan Liberec as a result of proven corruption.)	30	14	10	6	45	26	+19	46	Qualification for Intertoto Cup second round
6	Jablonec	30	12	9	9	33	27	+6	45	
7	Baník Ostrava	30	9	10	11	33	36	−3	37	Qualification for UEFA Cup first round (Note: Baník Ostrava won the 2004–05 Czech Cup and qualified for the first round of the UEFA Cup.)
8	Drnovice (R)	30	9	8	13	30	34	−4	35	Relegation to Czech 2. Liga (Note: FK Drnovice were refused a Czech First League license for the following season.)
9	Marila Příbram	30	9	8	13	30	41	−11	35	
10	Tescoma Zlín	30	7	12	11	29	35	−6	33	Qualification for Intertoto Cup first round
11	Brno	30	9	6	15	30	42	−12	33	
12	Blšany	30	7	11	12	25	38	−13	32	
13	Slovácko (Note: Twelve points were taken off from Slovácko as a result of proven corruption.)	30	10	14	6	30	22	+8	32	
14	Mladá Boleslav	30	6	13	11	26	35	−9	31	
15	Dynamo České Budějovice (R)	30	6	7	17	28	39	−11	25	Relegation to Czech 2. Liga
16	Opava (Note: Six points were taken off from SFC Opava as a result of proven corruption.) (R)	30	5	9	16	25	42	−17	18	Relegation to Czech 2. Liga

Source: Fortuna liga
Rules for classification: 1) points; 2) head-to-head points; 3) head-to-head goal difference; 4) head-to-head goals scored; 5) goal difference; 6) number of goals scored.
(C) Champions; (R) Relegated

== Results ==
Home \ Away	OST	BLŠ	BRN	DRN	ČBU	JAB	PŘÍ	MBO	OPA	OLO	SLA	SLO	LIB	SPA	TEP	ZLÍ
Baník Ostrava		1–0	1–1	2–2	2–0	0–0	2–1	2–0	0–0	4–0	0–2	2–2	0–4	0–2	1–2	3–1
Blšany	0–2		0–1	1–1	1–0	0–0	3–2	2–0	1–0	2–2	0–3	2–0	1–1	1–3	2–2	2–0
Brno	2–0	1–1		1–0	0–0	1–2	1–2	2–0	2–1	0–1	0–1	1–0	1–2	0–1	1–3	1–1
Drnovice	1–0	0–0	1–3		2–0	0–1	0–1	2–0	1–1	0–0	2–1	1–0	1–1	2–3	2–0	2–0
Dynamo České Budějovice	0–1	3–0	1–1	2–1		0–1	0–0	3–0	2–0	1–2	1–2	0–2	1–2	1–2	0–1	0–0
Jablonec	1–1	3–0	2–0	1–0	1–2		3–1	2–0	0–1	0–1	1–1	1–1	1–2	3–0	1–1	1–0
Marila Příbram	1–2	2–1	1–3	1–2	1–0	3–1		2–1	2–1	0–0	0–1	0–0	1–1	3–1	0–2	0–0
Mladá Boleslav	1–1	1–1	4–0	0–0	1–0	1–0	0–0		1–1	1–2	1–1	0–0	0–1	2–1	0–0	1–1
Opava	1–1	1–2	2–0	0–0	2–2	4–1	0–2	2–1		1–2	1–2	2–2	1–1	0–1	0–0	1–2
Sigma Olomouc	2–2	1–0	2–1	4–1	2–1	0–1	3–0	2–0	0–1		2–1	1–0	2–2	0–2	3–3	1–0
Slavia Prague	1–0	0–0	3–0	2–1	0–2	1–1	5–1	2–2	1–0	3–2		0–0	1–0	1–1	2–0	1–0
Slovácko	3–1	1–0	1–2	2–1	0–0	1–0	1–1	1–1	1–0	1–0	2–0		1–1	2–0	0–0	3–1
Slovan Liberec	1–0	3–0	1–0	0–2	3–2	1–1	2–0	1–3	3–0	3–0	1–1	1–1		0–1	4–0	1–1
Sparta Prague	2–1	4–2	2–0	2–0	2–0	3–1	4–2	0–1	5–1	2–0	2–0	1–1	2–1		1–2	2–0
Teplice	2–0	0–0	3–1	2–1	5–2	0–0	1–0	1–1	1–0	1–0	1–0	1–1	0–1	0–0		2–1
Tescoma Zlín	1–1	0–0	3–3	3–1	2–2	1–2	0–0	2–2	3–0	0–2	1–0	1–0	1–0	1–1	2–0	

Source: Fortuna liga
Legend: Blue = home team win; Yellow = draw; Red = away team win.

== Top goalscorers ==
Rank	Player	Club	Goals
1	(Czech Republic) Tomáš Jun	Sparta Prague	14
2	(Czech Republic) Luděk Zelenka	Brno	12
3	(Czech Republic) Stanislav Vlček	Slavia Prague	10
3	(Czech Republic) Jiří Mašek	Teplice	10
5	(Czech Republic) Marek Kulič	Dynamo České Budějovice	9
5	(Czech Republic) Michal Pospíšil	Slovan Liberec	9

== Attendances ==
#	Club	Average
1	Baník Ostrava	8,028
2	Sparta Praha	5,152
3	Slovácko	4,908
4	Sigma Olomouc	4,831
5	Teplice	4,497
6	Mladá Boleslav	4,487
7	Slovan Liberec	4,470
8	Opava	3,651
9	Slavia Praha	3,222
10	Příbram	3,174
11	Zbrojovka Brno	2,887
12	Česke Budějovice	2,802
13	Drnovice	2,728
14	Zlín	2,710
15	Jablonec	2,625
16	Blšany	1,583

== See also ==
- 2004–05 Czech Cup
- 2004–05 Czech 2. Liga
