= Luboš Pecka =

Czech footballer (born 1978)

Personal information
- Date of birth: 19 February 1978 (age 48)
- Place of birth: Prachatice, Czechoslovakia
- Height: 1.78 m (5 ft 10 in)
- Position: Striker

Youth career
- 1986–1997: Tatran Prachatice

Senior career*
Years	Team	Apps	(Gls)
1997–1998	Tatran Prachatice		
1998	→ České Budějovice (loan)	3	(0)
1999–2000	Tatran Prachatice		
2001–2002	České Budějovice	22	(1)
2002–2004	Tatran Prachatice		
2004–2007	Mladá Boleslav	74	(27)
2007–2008	→ Alemannia Aachen (loan)	19	(1)
2008–2010	Mladá Boleslav	31	(6)
2010–2012	České Budějovice	35	(1)
2012	→ MAS Táborsko (loan)	14	(1)
- * Club domestic league appearances and goals

Luboš Pecka (born 19 February 1978) is a Czech former professional footballer who played as a striker or attacking midfielder.

== Career ==
Pecka first began his youth career with FK Lažiště and Tatran Prachatice. His first team came with a brief spell at SK České Budějovice (2000–2001) before returning to Tatran Prachatice (2001–2004). He then move to Czech top flight club FK Mladá Boleslav. In his first season, he scored three times in 16 games (2004–05). His next season was big improvement because he scored nine in 25 games (2005–06). The next season, he was top scorer of the Czech First League with 16 in 29 (2006–07). This earned him a loan move to Alemannia Aachen.

He was called up to the Czech Republic senior side although he did not make his debut.
