= Neđeljko Kovinić =

Montenegrin footballer

Personal information
- Full name: Neđeljko Kovinić
- Date of birth: 7 February 2002 (age 24)
- Place of birth: Cetinje, FR Yugoslavia
- Height: 1.90 m (6 ft 3 in)
- Position: Striker

Team information
- Current team: Arsenal Tivat
- Number: 90

Youth career
- Arsenal Tivat
- Budućnost Podgorica
- Partizan

Senior career*
Years	Team	Apps	(Gls)
2021	Radnički Kragujevac	8	(0)
2022	Bokelj	16	(8)
2022–2024	FC Fastav Zlin	30	(4)
2024	→ Viktoria Žižkov (loan)	8	(0)
2025	Arsenal Tivat	19	(5)
2025	Petrovac	9	(1)
2026–	Arsenal Tivat	15	(7)

International career
2020	Montenegro U19	2	(0)
2023	Montenegro U21	2	(0)
- * Club domestic league appearances and goals

Neđeljko Kovinić (born 7 February 2002) is a Montenegrin professional footballer who plays as a striker for Arsenal Tivat.

He used to represent Montenegro at Under-19 and Under-21 level.

== Club career ==
After playing for Arsenal Tivat, Budućnost Podgorica and Partizan at youth level, he made his professional debut at Radnički Kragujevac. After just eight appearances in Superliga Srbije he went back to native Montenegro where he started playing for Bokelj. Very good half season in Kotor recommended him to foreign clubs and then he signed for FC Fastav Zlin where he played for two seasons with short loan spell in Viktoria Žižkov before transferring back to Arsenal Tivat. The 2025–26 season started in Petrovac but in winter transfer window, he again went back to Arsenal Tivat where he plays now.
