= Marek Matějovský =

Czech footballer (born 1981)

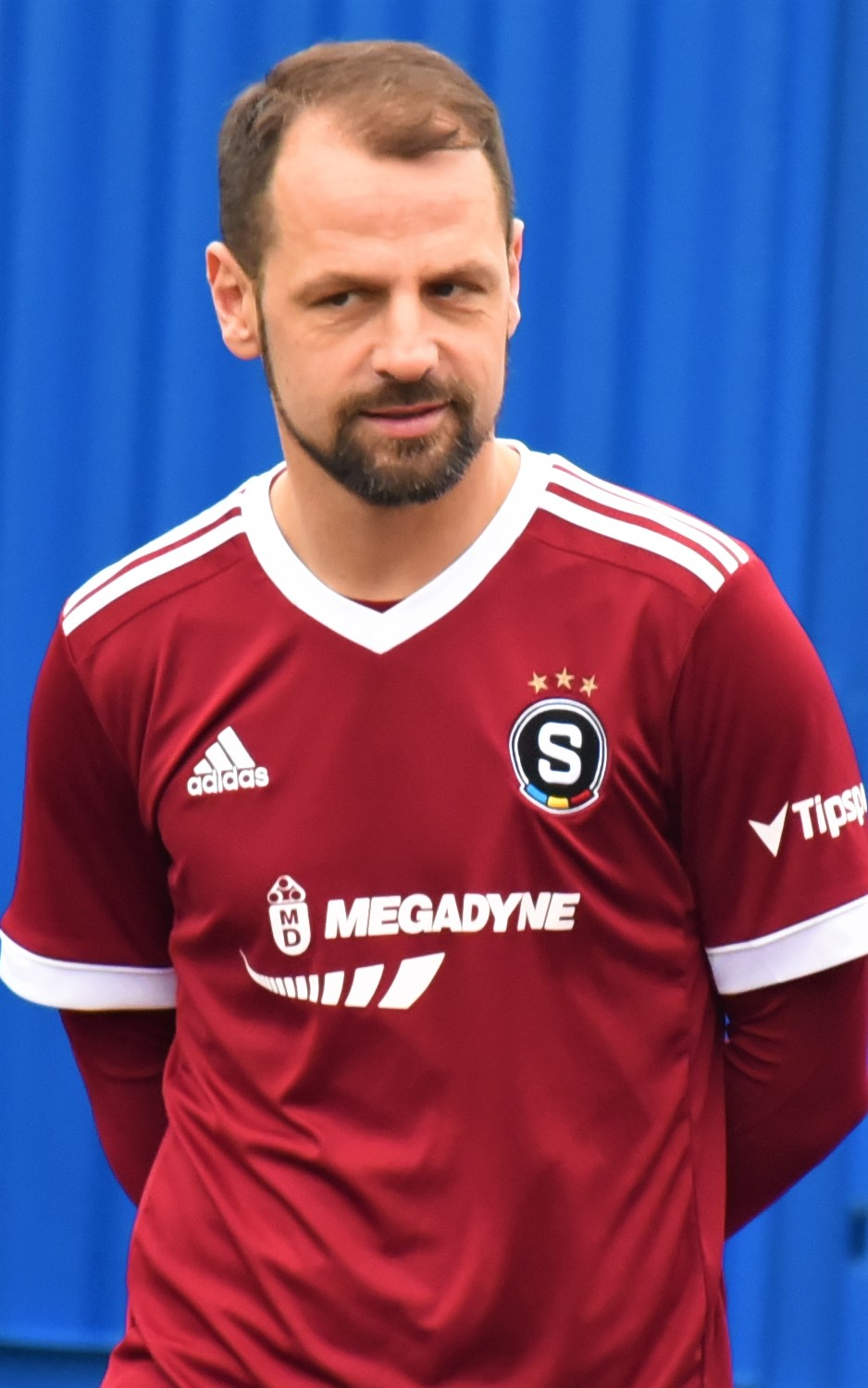
- Matějovský in 2021

Personal information
- Date of birth: 20 December 1981 (age 44)
- Place of birth: Brandýs nad Labem-Stará Boleslav, Czechoslovakia
- Height: 1.81 m (5 ft 11 in)
- Position: Midfielder

Youth career
- 1986–1990: Slavoj Stará Boleslav
- 1990–1994: Alfa Brandýs nad Labem
- 1994–1999: Mladá Boleslav

Senior career*
Years	Team	Apps	(Gls)
1999–2001	Mladá Boleslav	16	(1)
2001–2003	Jablonec	6	(0)
2003–2008	Mladá Boleslav	98	(7)
2008–2010	Reading	51	(2)
2010–2017	Sparta Prague	150	(2)
2016–2017	→ Mladá Boleslav (loan)	13	(1)
2017–2025	Mladá Boleslav	176	(15)
Total		510	(28)

International career
2001	Czech Republic U20	2	(2)
2007–2011	Czech Republic	15	(1)
- * Club domestic league appearances and goals

Marek Matějovský (born 20 December 1981) is a Czech former footballer who played as a central midfielder. He was valued as a creative player with a high number of assists for goals. He is among the most significant players of the history of the Czech First League, where he played 443 games and retired at the age of 43. He spent most of his career in FK Mladá Boleslav and AC Sparta Prague, but he also played in the Premier League and for the Czech Republic national football team.

== Club career ==
=== Early career and Mladá Boleslav ===
Matějovský started his football career at the age of five with Slavoj Stará Boleslav, progressing to Alfa Brandýs nad Labem at the age of 13. After turning 18, he signed professional terms with FK Mladá Boleslav for the 1999–2000 season, who were then playing in the Czech 2. Liga. In the spring of 2001, he switched to Czech First League team Jablonec, but returned to Mladá Boleslav in January 2003. After settling back into the team, he helped them win promotion to the Czech First League for the start of the 2004–05 season, where they remained for the rest of Matějovský's stay at the club. He was promoted to captain of Mladá Boleslav at the start of the 2005–06 season.

=== Reading ===
Matějovský's performances in the Czech Republic alerted big clubs elsewhere in Europe to his ability, and he was linked with moves to Liverpool, Hamburg and Steaua Bucharest. However, it was announced on 7 January 2008 that Reading had signed Matějovský on a three-and-a-half-year contract for an undisclosed fee, believed to be around £1.42 million.

Nick Hammond said, "Marek is primarily a central midfield player but he is also capable of playing in both wide positions or behind the strikers – he is a player we have been following for some time, and when the opportunity arose to sign him it was too good to turn down." Brian McDermott kept an eye on him for roughly 18 months, and had seen him in action a number of times. He said "He's captain of his club, and has played all their games in the last three years except when he's been suspended. That's the type of guy he is."

He made his debut for Reading on 19 January in a 2–0 home defeat to Manchester United, coming on as an 80th-minute substitute for Bobby Convey. His first start for Reading was in another 2–0 home defeat, this time to Bolton Wanderers on 2 February. Matějovský scored his first goal for Reading on 15 March, with a 20-yard effort in a 2–1 loss at Liverpool. Two weeks later, he was sent off in a goalless draw against Blackburn Rovers at the Madejski Stadium. He totalled 15 appearances in his first season, which ended with relegation to the Championship.

=== Sparta Prague ===
Matějovský returned to the Czech Republic in 2010, joining Sparta Prague and was announced as the new club captain ahead of the 2011–12 Czech First League, taking over from Tomáš Řepka. He played 150 games for Sparta and is considered one of the club's personalities. Every year, he participates in the New Year's Eve derby between the legends of Sparta and Slavia over 35 years old.

=== Return to Mladá Boleslav ===
Before the 2016–17 season, Matějovský returned to FK Mladá Boleslav and became the club's captain. Despite his age, he remained a valuable player for his football thinking, creative playmaking and final passes. For Mladá Boleslav, he played a total of 287 first league league matches, the most in the club's history, and became a club legend. Matějovský was awarded as the Personality of the Season in the 2021–22, 2023–24 and 2024–25 seasons by League Football Association (LFA).

== Czech First League records ==
Matějovský is among the most significant players of the Czech First League. He entered the Legends Club for players with 300+ league games in March 2018. In total, he played in 443 games during his active career (3rd most starts in history of the Czech First League at the time of the end of his career). He appeared in 22 seasons of the Czech First League, which is the most in history.

Matějovský is among the league's top ten players with the most goal assists (69 assists, 5th most after the 2024–25 season). In the 2022–23 season, at the age of 40–41, he had 9 assists, the most among all players.

On 8 December 2024, Matějovský scored hattrick in the match against SK Dynamo České Budějovice and became the oldest hattrick scorer of the league at the age of 42 years, 11 months and 18 days. He was also the oldest scorer overall, surpassing his own record from May 2024, but on 5 May 2025, Josef Jindřišek surpassed him by a goal from penalty in his farewell match. Matějovský thus remains only the oldest scorer to score from a game.

In addition to his other records, with 110 yellow cards, Matějovský is the player with the highest number of yellow cards in league history (but Admir Ljevaković, with 106 cards received them in much fewer matches).

== International career ==
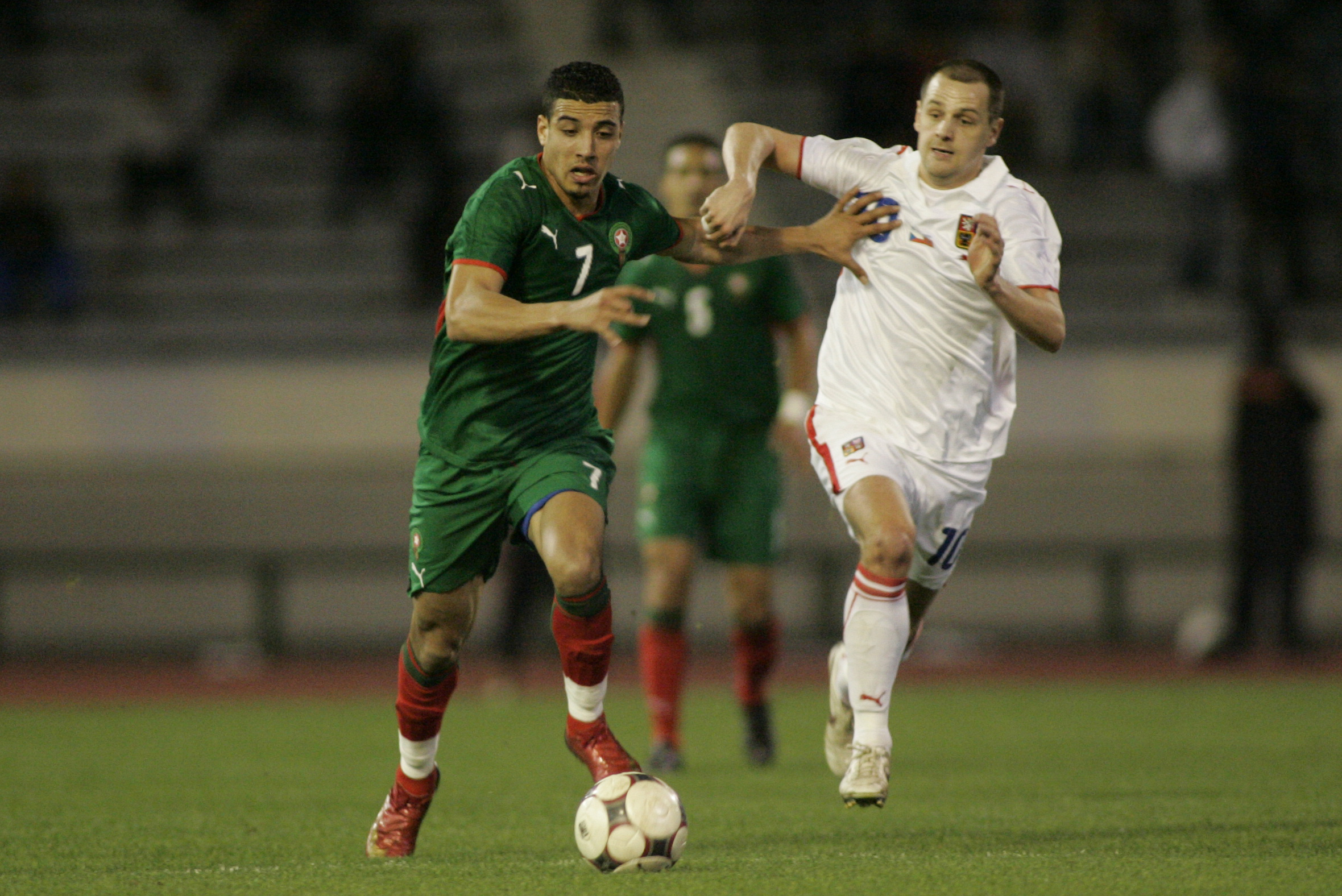
Matějovský challenging Morocco's Nabil Dirar in a February 2009 friendly

Matějovský was capped 15 times by the Czech Republic national football team. Karel Brückner first called him up as a replacement for the injured David Jarolím for the Czech Republic's Euro 2008 qualifier against Wales on 2 September 2006, but had to wait until 7 February 2007 to make his international debut as a 70th-minute substitute in a friendly with Belgium, coming on for Tomáš Galásek and assisting the second goal in a 2–0 win.

He scored his only international goal in the Czech Republic's 3–0 win over Germany in Munich, also hitting the post, to cement their place at Euro 2008. He started the second and third group games at the Euro 2008 but was taken off with an injury against Turkey.

== Personal life ==
Matějovský married in the summer of 2007. Outside football, he is also a keen ice hockey player.

== Career statistics ==
As of match played 28 July 2015

Club	Season	League			National Cup		League Cup		Continental		Other		Total	
Club	Season	Division	Apps	Goals	Apps	Goals	Apps	Goals	Apps	Goals	Apps	Goals	Apps	Goals
Mladá Boleslav	1999–2000	2. Liga	2	0			-		-		-		2	0
Mladá Boleslav	2000–01	2. Liga	14	1			-		-		-		14	1
Mladá Boleslav	Total		16	1			-	-	-	-	-	-	16	1
Jablonec	2000–01	Czech First League	1	0			-		-		-		1	0
Jablonec	2001–02	Czech First League	4	0			-		-		-		4	0
Jablonec	2002–03	Czech First League	1	0			-		-		-		1	0
Jablonec	Total		6	0			-	-	-	-	-	-	6	0
Mladá Boleslav (loan)	2001–02	2. Liga	3	0			-		-		-		3	0
Mladá Boleslav	2003–04	2. Liga	0	0			-		-		-		0	0
Mladá Boleslav	2004–05	Czech First League	28	1			-		-		-		28	1
Mladá Boleslav	2005–06	Czech First League	26	5			-		-		-		26	5
Mladá Boleslav	2006–07	Czech First League	29	0			-		12	1	-		41	1
Mladá Boleslav	2007–08	Czech First League	15	1			-		5	0	-		20	1
Mladá Boleslav	Total		98	7			-	-	17	1	-	-	115	8
Reading	2007–08	Premier League	14	1	0	0	0	0	-		-		14	1
Reading	2008–09	Championship	22	1	1	0	0	0	-		2	0	25	1
Reading	2009–10	Championship	15	0	0	0	2	0	-		-		17	0
Reading	Total		51	2	1	0	2	0	-	-	2	0	56	2
Sparta Prague	2010–11	Czech First League	25	0	0	0	-		10	1	1	0	36	1
Sparta Prague	2011–12	Czech First League	29	1	5	1	-		4	1	-		38	3
Sparta Prague	2012–13	Czech First League	24	0	2	0	-		9	0	-		35	0
Sparta Prague	2013–14	Czech First League	22	1	7	0	-		2	0	-		31	1
Sparta Prague	2014–15	Czech First League	24	0	5	0	-		11	0	1	0	41	0
Sparta Prague	2015–16	Czech First League	1	0	0	0	-		1	0	-		2	0
Sparta Prague	Total		125	2	19	1	-	-	37	2	2	0	183	5
Career total			299	12	20	1	2	0	54	3	4	0	379	16

=== International ===
Czech Republic
Year	Apps	Goals
2007	6	1
2008	6	0
2009	3	0
Total	15	1

=== International goals ===
#	Date	Venue	Opponent	Score	Result	Competition
1.	17 October 2007	Munich, Germany	Germany	2–0	3–0	UEFA Euro 2008 qualifying Group D

== Honours and records ==
Sparta Prague

- Czech First League: 2013–14
- Czech Cup: 2013–14
- Czech Supercup: 2010, 2014

Individual

- Czech First League
  - Top assist: 2022–23
  - Personality of the Season: 2021–22, 2023–24, 2024–25
  - Oldest hattrick scorer: age 42 years, 11 months and 18 days
  - Most seasons played: 22
- FK Mladá Boleslav: most caps (287)
