= Jonathan Crawford (sportsman) =

Australian rules footballer

Personal information
- Born: 15 June 1928
- Died: 14 July 2011 (aged 83)
- Height: 177 cm (5 ft 10 in)
- Weight: 71 kg (157 lb)

Playing career^{1}
Years	Club	Games (Goals)
1948–52	St Kilda	36 (21)
- ^{1} Playing statistics correct to the end of 1952.

Jonathan Crawford (born Jonathan Crawford Solomon; 15 June 1928 – 14 July 2011) was a sportsman, dress designer and publican who played both Australian rules football and cricket in St Kilda, Victoria.

As a footballer, he played 36 games with St Kilda from 1948 to 1952 under the name Jack Solomon. He changed his name to Jonathan Crawford in 1955.
