= Martin Rolinek =

Czech footballer

Personal information
- Date of birth: 30 June 2000 (age 26)
- Place of birth: Brno, Czech Republic
- Position: Midfielder

Team information
- Current team: Chrudim (on loan from Artis Brno)
- Number: 24

Youth career
- 2006–2012: SK Říčany
- 2012–2013: FC Sparta Brno
- 2013–2015: FC Zbrojovka Brno
- 2016–2018: SK Líšeň

Senior career*
Years	Team	Apps	(Gls)
2018–2021	Líšeň	66	(11)
2022–2023	Mladá Boleslav	6	(0)
2022	Mladá Boleslav B	5	(1)
2022	→ Karviná (loan)	6	(0)
2023	Prostějov	15	(0)
2024–	Artis Brno	39	(3)
2025	→ Hanácká Slavia Kroměříž (loan)	8	(0)
2025	→ Chrudim (loan)	5	(0)
- * Club domestic league appearances and goals as of 28 May 2026

Martin Rolinek (born 30 June 2000) is a Czech professional footballer who plays for Chrudim on loan from Líšeň as a midfielder.
