= Denis Donát =

Czech footballer (born 2001)

Personal information
- Date of birth: 14 September 2001 (age 25)
- Place of birth: Řešetova Lhota, Czech Republic
- Height: 1.90 m (6 ft 3 in)
- Positions: Centre-back; defensive midfielder

Team information
- Current team: Mladá Boleslav
- Number: 13

Youth career
- 2008–2016: FK Náchod
- 2016–2020: Hradec Králové

Senior career*
Years	Team	Apps	(Gls)
2020–2022	Hradec Králové	44	(2)
2022	→ Chrudim (loan)	13	(0)
2022–	Mladá Boleslav	63	(2)
2023–2024	→ Pardubice (loan)	22	(0)

International career
2018–2019	Czech Republic U18	5	(0)
2022	Czech Republic U20	2	(0)
2021–2022	Czech Republic U21	4	(0)
- * Club domestic league appearances and goals as of 23 October 2026

Denis Donát (born 14 September 2001) is a Czech professional footballer who plays as a defender for the Czech First League club FK Mladá Boleslav.

== Life ==
Denis Donát was born in Řešetova Lhota (part of Studnice). His brother and father are amateur footballers.

== Club career ==
Donát was raised in FK Náchod, from which he transferred to the youth teams of FC Hradec Králové. He made his debut for the senior team of Hradec Králové on 11 June 2020, in their Czech National Football League match against Viktoria Žižkov. In the following season of 2020–21 season, he played regularly for Hradec Králové and helped his club to promote to the Czech First League. He made his Czech First League debut on 24 July 2021, at the age of 19, in their 1–1 home draw against Bohemians 1905.

In the second half of the 2021–22 season, he was sent on loan to Chrudim, which played in the Czech National Football League. In June 2022, he transferred to FK Mladá Boleslav. He spent the 2023–24 season on loan in FK Pardubice. In October 2026, after 61 league appearances for Mladá Boleslav, he extended his contract with the club.

== International career ==
Donát played for the U18, U20 and U21 Czech Republic youth national teams.
