= David Šimek =

Czech footballer (born 1998)

Personal information
- Date of birth: 15 February 1998 (age 28)
- Place of birth: Czech Republic
- Height: 1.93 m (6 ft 4 in)
- Position: Centre-back

Team information
- Current team: Artis Brno
- Number: 28

Youth career
- 2009–2011: Sparta Prague
- 2011–2016: Dukla Prague

Senior career*
Years	Team	Apps	(Gls)
2016–2019	Dukla Prague	0	(0)
2018	→ Slavoj Vyšehrad (loan)	15	(0)
2019	→ Viktoria Žižkov (loan)	9	(0)
2019–2020	Příbram	20	(0)
2020–2024	Mladá Boleslav	74	(5)
2024–2026	Pardubice	29	(0)
2026–	Artis Brno	0	(0)
- * Club domestic league appearances and goals as of 19 June 2026

David Šimek (born 15 February 1998) is a Czech professional footballer who plays as a defender for Czech First League club Artis Brno.

== Club career ==
Šimek was raised in FK Dukla Prague. His beginnings in senior football were short loan spells in Slavoj Vyšehrad and Viktoria Žižkov. Before the 2019–20 season, he transferred to FK Příbram. He made his Czech First League debut for Příbram on 13 July 2019, at the age of 19, in their 1–1 home draw against Teplice. From 2020, he played for FK Mladá Boleslav, where he appeared in 74 games. Before the 2024–25 season, he transferred to FK Pardubice.

Šimek appeared in 29 matches for Pardubice. Before the 2026–27 season, he transferred to Artis Arno.

== International career ==
In 2019, Šimek was nominated for the 2021 UEFA European Under-21 Championship qualification match against Lithuania, but remained only among the substitutes.
