= Daniel Mareček =

Czech footballer

Personal information
- Date of birth: 30 May 1998 (age 28)
- Place of birth: Prague, Czech Republic
- Height: 1.80 m (5 ft 11 in)
- Position: Midfielder

Team information
- Current team: Teplice
- Number: 37

Youth career
- Sparta Prague

Senior career*
Years	Team	Apps	(Gls)
2016–2020	Sparta Prague	0	(0)
2018	→ Vlašim (loan)	27	(1)
2019	→ České Budějovice (loan)	2	(0)
2020–2021	Slovácko	19	(1)
2022	Bohemians 1905	9	(0)
2022	→ Mladá Boleslav (loan)	15	(5)
2023–2025	Mladá Boleslav	76	(10)
2025–	Teplice	28	(4)

International career
2013–2014	Czech Republic U16	4	(0)
2015–2016	Czech Republic U18	6	(0)
2016–2017	Czech Republic U19	15	(1)
2017	Czech Republic U20	2	(0)
- * Club domestic league appearances and goals as of 27 May 2026

Daniel Mareček (born 30 May 1998) is a Czech professional footballer who plays as a midfielder for Teplice.

== Club career ==
=== Sparta Prague ===
On 4 May 2016, Mareček made his senior team debut in Czech Cup against FK Jablonec at Generali Arena. On 13 February 2019, Mareček was loaned out to SK Dynamo České Budějovice for the rest of the season.

=== Teplice ===
On 8 September 2025, Mareček signed a contract with FK Teplice.
