= Solomon John =

Nigerian footballer (born 2001)

Personal information
- Date of birth: 8 August 2001 (age 25)
- Place of birth: Nigeria
- Height: 1.70 m (5 ft 7 in)
- Position: Attacking midfielder

Team information
- Current team: FK Mladá Boleslav
- Number: 20

Youth career
- Beyond Limits

Senior career*
Years	Team	Apps	(Gls)
2019	Remo Stars	11	(0)
2019–2021	C.D. Feirense	0	(0)
2019	→ C.D. Feirense Sub-23	4	(0)
2020–2021	→ Leça (loan)	0	(0)
2022–2023	Vlašim	40	(6)
2023–	Mladá Boleslav	83	(11)
- * Club domestic league appearances and goals as of 25 August 2026

Solomon John or John Solomon (born 8 August 2001) is a Nigerian professional footballer who plays as an attacking midfielder for FK Mladá Boleslav.

== Life ==
Solomon John was born on 8 August 2001.

== Club career ==
He was raised at the Nigerian academy of Remo Stars. In the summer of 2019, he joined the Portuguese club C.D. Feirense, playing in the Liga Portugal 2. He spent the 2020–21 season on loan in Leça, competing in Liga 3. After several unsuccessful trials at various clubs, he joined Vlašim from the Czech National Football League. In August 2023, he transferred to Mladá Boleslav, which competes in the Czech First League.

== Style of play ==
John is valued for his dribbling with the ball. He most often plays as a winger.
