= Lokotrans Aréna =

Stadium in Mladá Boleslav, Czech Republic

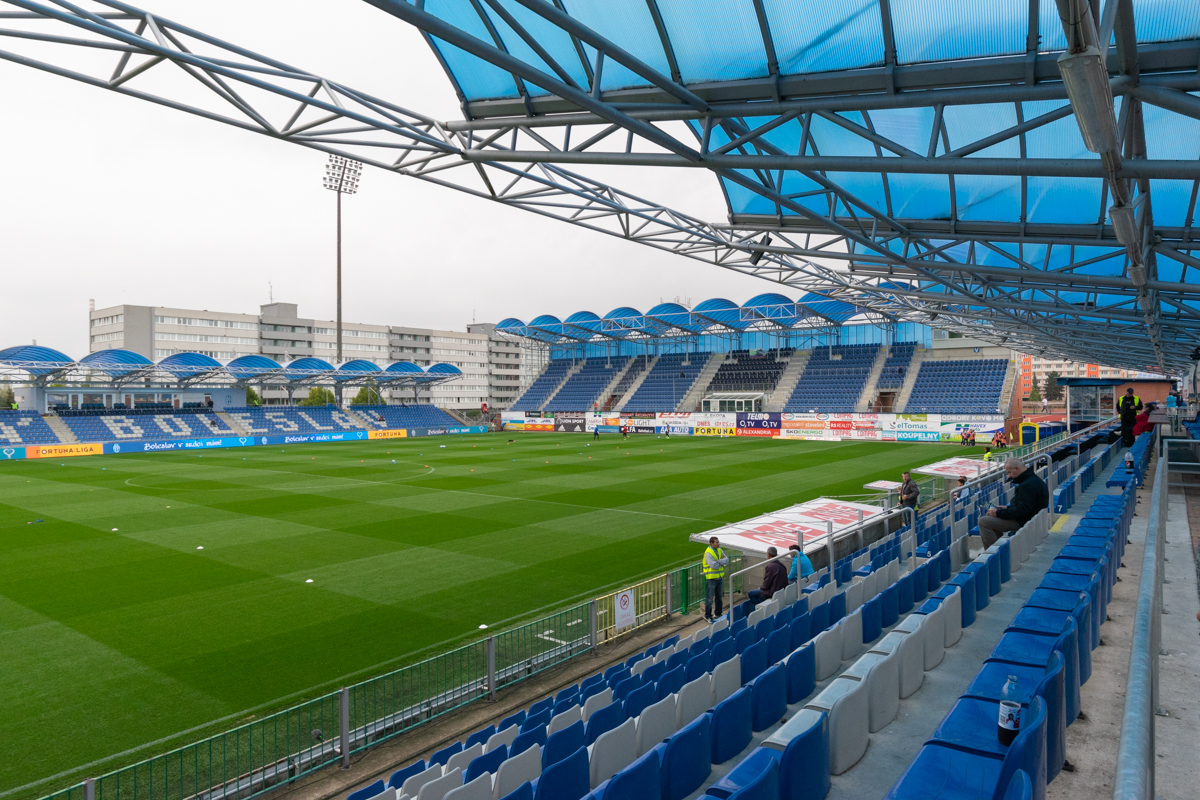
- Interactive map of Lokotrans Aréna
- Location: U Stadionu 1118, Mladá Boleslav, Czech Republic, 293 01
- Coordinates: 50°25′38″N 14°55′1″E
- Owner: Mladá Boleslav
- Capacity: 5,000
- Field size: 105 x 68

Construction
- Opened: 1965

Tenants
- FK Mladá Boleslav; Hradec Králové (2021–2023)

Lokotrans Aréna is a multi-purpose stadium in Mladá Boleslav, Czech Republic. With a capacity of 5,000 people, it is currently used mostly for football matches and is the home ground of FK Mladá Boleslav. The stadium opened in 1965 and was used for the Spartakiad that year. The stadium was known as Městský stadion Mladá Boleslav (lit. 'Mladá Boleslav City Stadium'), before being renamed for sponsorship reasons to Lokotrans Aréna in July 2019.

== International matches ==
Městský stadion has hosted two friendly matches of the Czech Republic national football team.

31 August 2016 International friendly	Czech Republic	3–0	Armenia	Mladá Boleslav, Czech Republic
19:15 CEST (UTC+02)	Krejčí 4'; Kadlec 34'; Kopic 86'	Report		Stadium: Městský stadion Mladá Boleslav; Attendance: 4,351; Referee: Vladimír Vnuk (Slovakia)

15 November 2016 International friendly	Czech Republic	1–1	Denmark	Mladá Boleslav, Czech Republic
20:30 CET (UTC+01)	Barák 8'	Report	N. Jørgensen 39'	Stadium: Městský stadion Mladá Boleslav; Attendance: 1,763; Referee: Manuel Schüttengruber (Austria)
