= Marek Kulič =

Czech footballer (born 1975)

Personal information
- Date of birth: 11 October 1975 (age 51)
- Place of birth: Hradec Králové, Czechoslovakia
- Height: 1.75 m (5 ft 9 in)
- Position: Forward

Youth career
- 1982–1991: Hradec Králové
- 1991–1992: Slavia Hradec Králové

Senior career*
Years	Team	Apps	(Gls)
1991–1992	Slavia Hradec Králové		
1992–1994	Malšovice		
1994–1996	Olympia Hradec Králové		
1996–1998	Lázně Bohdaneč	27	(2)
1999	Drnovice	13	(1)
1999	Lázně Bohdaneč	3	(2)
1999–2003	Příbram	109	(22)
2003–2005	Dynamo České Budějovice	46	(17)
2005–2006	Mladá Boleslav	42	(11)
2007–2009	Sparta Prague	63	(12)
2009–2012	Mladá Boleslav	52	(20)
2013–2014	Hradec Králové	45	(4)

International career
2006–2008	Czech Republic	12	(3)

Managerial career
- 2020–2021: Mladá Boleslav B
- 2021–2023: Mladá Boleslav (assistant)
- 2023: Mladá Boleslav
- 2024: Pardubice (assistant)
- 2025: Chrudim (youth)
- 2025–2026: Chrudim
- * Club domestic league appearances and goals

Marek Kulič (born 11 October 1975) is a Czech former professional footballer who played as a forward. He played for FC Hradec Králové, AFK Atlantic Lázně Bohdaneč, FK Drnovice, FK Marila Příbram from 1999 to 2003, SK Dynamo České Budějovice from 2003 to 2005, and in FK Mladá Boleslav from 2005 to 2007. After two years in Sparta Prague he transferred back to FK Mladá Boleslav in June 2009, where he served as captain. He made 12 appearances for the Czech Republic national team scoring 3 goals.

== Managerial career ==
On 26 May 2023, Kulič was announced as the manager of FK Mladá Boleslav managing the first team since pre-season training camp, replacing Pavel Hoftych, who will become sporting manager of the club.

== Honours ==
- Czech Cup (1):
  - 2008
