= Jakub Fulnek =

Czech footballer

Personal information
- Date of birth: 26 April 1994 (age 32)
- Place of birth: Czech Republic
- Height: 1.72 m (5 ft 8 in)
- Position: Winger

Team information
- Current team: Artis Brno
- Number: 22

Youth career
- 2002–2005: SK Metylovice
- 2005–2016: 1. BFK Frýdlant nad Ostravicí
- 2006–2010: Vítkovice
- 2010–2011: Brno
- 2011–2013: Karviná
- 2013–2014: Jihlava

Senior career*
Years	Team	Apps	(Gls)
2014–2019	Jihlava	97	(4)
2016	→ Táborsko (loan)	12	(0)
2019–2026	Mladá Boleslav	140	(5)
2021–2022	→ Bohemians 1905 (loan)	19	(0)
2026–	Artis Brno	13	(0)

International career
2012	Czech Republic U18	9	(0)
2014–2016	Czech Republic U20	6	(1)
2015	Czech Republic U21	3	(0)
- * Club domestic league appearances and goals as of 24 May 2026

Jakub Fulnek (born 26 April 1994) is a Czech professional footballer who plays as a winger for Czech First League club Artis Brno.

== Career ==
=== Mladá Boleslav ===
On 5 January 2019, Fulnek officially signed for Mladá Boleslav in the Czech First League.
