= Daniel Langhamer =

Czech footballer

Personal information
- Date of birth: 20 March 2003 (age 23)
- Place of birth: Prague, Czech Republic
- Height: 1.80 m (5 ft 11 in)
- Position: Midfielder

Team information
- Current team: Mladá Boleslav
- Number: 28

Youth career
- 2011–2020: Slavia Prague

Senior career*
Years	Team	Apps	(Gls)
2020	Slavia Prague B	3	(2)
2020–	Mladá Boleslav	39	(1)
2020–2022	→→ Mladá Boleslav B	13	(2)
2021–2022	→ Příbram (loan)	13	(0)
2021–2022	→ Příbram B (loan)	1	(0)
2022	→ Vlašim (loan)	15	(1)
2023	→ Příbram (loan)	13	(0)
2023–2024	→ Chrudim (loan)	30	(8)
2025	→ Teplice (loan)	14	(1)

International career^{‡}
2019	Czech Republic U17	3	(1)
2021	Czech Republic U19	4	(0)
2023	Czech Republic U20	5	(0)
2024–	Czech Republic U21	6	(0)
- * Club domestic league appearances and goals as of 27 May 2026 ‡ National team caps and goals as of 31 January 2025

Daniel Langhamer (born 20 March 2003) is a Czech footballer who currently plays as a midfielder for Mladá Boleslav.

On 31 January 2025, Langhamer joined Teplice on a half-year loan deal.

== Career statistics ==
=== Club ===
As of 10 November 2021

Club	Season	League			Cup		Continental		Other		Total	
Club	Season	Division	Apps	Goals	Apps	Goals	Apps	Goals	Apps	Goals	Apps	Goals
Slavia Prague B	2020–21	ČFL	3	0	–		–		0	0	3	0
Mladá Boleslav	2020–21	Fortuna liga	1	0	1 (Note: Appearances in the Czech Cup)	0	–		0	0	2	0
Mladá Boleslav	2021–22	Fortuna liga	0	0	0	0	0	0	0	0	0	0
Mladá Boleslav	Total		1	0	1	0	0	0	0	0	2	0
Mladá Boleslav B	2020–21	ČFL	3	0	–		–		0	0	3	0
Příbram (loan)	2021–22	FNL	13	0	2	0	–		0	0	15	0
Příbram B (loan)	2021–22	ČFL	1	0	0	0	–		0	0	1	0
Career total			21	0	3	0	0	0	0	0	24	0
