= Ondřej Karafiát =

Czech footballer (born 1994)

Personal information
- Date of birth: 1 December 1994 (age 31)
- Place of birth: Prague, Czech Republic
- Height: 1.82 m (6 ft 0 in)
- Position: Centre-back

Team information
- Current team: Mladá Boleslav
- Number: 44

Youth career
- Sparta Prague

Senior career*
Years	Team	Apps	(Gls)
2013–2015	Sparta Prague	0	(0)
2014–2015	→ Viktoria Žižkov (loan)	25	(1)
2015	→ České Budějovice (loan)	13	(0)
2016–2020	Slovan Liberec	108	(1)
2020–2022	Slavia Prague	5	(0)
2021	→ Slovan Liberec	18	(2)
2021–2022	→ Mladá Boleslav	40	(1)
2023–2024	Mladá Boleslav	48	(1)
2024–2026	1. FC Nürnberg	34	(2)
2026–	Mladá Boleslav	15	(1)

International career
2010	Czech Republic U16	3	(0)
2010–2011	Czech Republic U17	13	(0)
2011–2012	Czech Republic U18	11	(0)
2012–2013	Czech Republic U19	6	(0)
2015	Czech Republic U20	1	(0)
- * Club domestic league appearances and goals as of 27 May 2026

Ondřej Karafiát (born 1 December 1994) is a Czech professional footballer who plays as a centre-back for Mladá Boleslav.

== Career ==
Karafiát made his senior league debut for Viktoria Žižkov on 3 August 2014 in a Czech National Football League 2–1 home win against Olomouc. He scored his first senior league goal on 11 September 2014 in a 4–0 home win against Kolín.

On 17 July 2020, he signed a four-year contract with Slavia Prague.

On 18 July 2024, Karafiát signed a contract with 2. Bundesliga club 1. FC Nürnberg. On 23 January 2026, his contract with Nürnberg was mutually terminated.

== Career statistics ==
=== Club ===
As of 30 December 2020

Appearances and goals by club, season and competition
Club	Season	League			Cup		Continental		Other		Total	
Club	Season	Division	Apps	Goals	Apps	Goals	Apps	Goals	Apps	Goals	Apps	Goals
Viktoria Žižkov (loan)	2014–15	Czech National Football League	25	1	3	0	—		—		28	1
České Budějovice (loan)	2015–16	Czech National Football League	13	0	0	0	—		—		13	0
Slovan Liberec	2015–16	Czech First League	4	0	0	0	—		—		4	0
Slovan Liberec	2016–17	Czech First League	22	0	2	1	5	0	—		29	1
Slovan Liberec	2017–18	Czech First League	24	1	4	0	—		—		28	1
Slovan Liberec	2018–19	Czech First League	29	0	4	0	—		—		33	0
Slovan Liberec	2019–20	Czech First League	29	0	4	0	—		—		33	0
Slovan Liberec	Total		108	1	14	1	5	0	—		127	2
Slavia Prague	2020–21	Czech First League	5	0	0	0	2	0	—		7	0
Career total			151	2	17	1	7	0	0	0	175	3
