= FK Mladá Boleslav =

Mladá Boleslav
- Full name: Fotbalový klub Mladá Boleslav a.s.
- Nickname: Bolka
- Founded: 1902; 124 years ago
- Ground: Lokotrans Aréna, Mladá Boleslav
- Capacity: 5,000
- Chairman: Luboš Bartůněk
- Manager: Aleš Majer
- League: Czech First League
- 2025–26: 13th of 16
- Website: www.fkmb.cz
Home colours	Away colours

FK Mladá Boleslav is a Czech professional football club based in the city of Mladá Boleslav. Since 2004, the club has been participating in the Czech First League.

In the Czech First League, Mladá Boleslav were runners up in 2005–06 and on third place in 2006–07 and 2013–14. The club won the Czech Cup in 2010–11 and 2015–16. In 2024–25, the club participated in the European Cups for the tenth time and qualified for the group stage for the third time.

== History ==
=== 1902–1947: Development of football in the city ===
The first registered football club in Mladá Boleslav and the official predecessor of FK Mladá Boleslav was Studentská XI. The club then transformed into S.K. Mladá Boleslav and then to Mladoboleslavský SK, officially founded in 1910.

In 1905, a team called SK Aston Villa Mladá Boleslav, referring to the English club Aston Villa F.C., was founded in Mladá Boleslav. In 1919, SK Aston Villa Mladá Boleslav has registered for league competitions, playing home games at the Astonka pitch near Havlíčkova Street. In the same year, the third club in the city – Slavoj Mladá Boleslav was founded. In 1934, new Astonka pitch was opened in Čechova Street.

In 1942 and 1944 respectively, Mladoboleslavský SK and Aston Villa did not take their chances to make it to the top Czechoslovak competition from the final stage of the qualification. The derby between the clubs in 1942 was watched by 8,000 spectators, which remains a record to this day.

=== 1948–1992: Merger of clubs and second tier ===
In 1948–1949, as a result of the advent of the communist regime in 1948, all three Mladá Boleslav clubs were gradually merged under the club "Závodní sokolská jednota Automobilové závody národní podnik Mladá Boleslav" (ZSJ AZNP Mladá Boleslav), referring by its name to the patronage of the Sokol movement and Škoda Auto factory, which was then called Automobilové závody národní podnik ("Automobile Works national enterprise"). Mladá Boleslav played in the second tier in 1952–1992 with the exception in 1959, when the club played in the third tier. In that era, the name was changed two times (TJ Spartak Mladá Boleslav from 1950, TJ Auto Škoda Mladá Boleslav from 1966). In 1983, 1984 and 1986, the club finished on third place.

In 1965, the new stadium was opened. However, the old pitch, which is still called Astonka, still exists today and the youth teams of FK Mladá Boleslav play matches there.

=== 1993–2000: Economic crisis ===
As a result of Škoda Auto's difficult economic situation after the Velvet Revolution in 1989, the company's support for sports clubs was reduced, leading to relegation of FK Mladá Boleslav to the third tier in 1992–93 and to the fourth tier in 1994–95. During these years, the club was a farm for SK Slavia Prague and Bohemians 1905. In the following two seasons, FK Mladá Boleslav again made it to the second league.

=== 2001–present: Modern era ===
In 2001, the club's most successful era began when the club was bought by the local construction company Gema and the company's co-owner Josef Dufek became the club's president. The new owners subsequently transformed the club into a joint-stock company, renewed cooperation with Škoda Auto as the club's main sponsor, started to cooperate with the city of Mladá Boleslav, acquired other business partners from the region, and renovated the stadium. In the summer of 2002, Josef Dufek publicly announced a five-year plan during which the second-league club was to become a participant in European cups.

The club was promoted to the Czech First League for the first time in its history in the 2003–04 season. In their first top-flight season, the club fought against relegation, eventually finishing in the 14th place. The club's greatest success was achieved in the 2005–06 season, as they finished runners-up in the Czech First League, earning a place in the qualifying rounds of the UEFA Champions League. The club thus fulfilled its ambitious plan in just four years. They came through their first tie, defeating Vålerenga (3–1 and 2–2), then lost against Galatasaray (2–5 away, 1–1 home), dropping into the UEFA Cup first round. The club went on to achieve a surprising 4–3 aggregate victory over Marseille (1st leg: 0–1, 2nd leg 4–2). The home match against Marseille is considered one of the greatest wins in the club's history. However, the club was eliminated after reaching the group stage, taking just 3 points from 4 matches (Panathinaikos 0–1, Hapoel Tel Aviv 1–1, Paris Saint-Germain 0–0, Rapid București 1–1).

The following season, the club finished 3rd in the league. The club's Luboš Pecka was the top goalscorer in the league that season. After the season, the coach Dušan Uhrin, Jr. decided to leave the club after leading it since October 2004. The club qualified directly for the first round of the UEFA Cup. Qualification for the group stage was only narrowly secured by beating Palermo 4–2 on penalties after a nail biting 1–1 aggregate scoreline. On the verge of being eliminated with the score reading 1–0 Palermo, (with their goal in the first leg still standing) in the 2nd leg, Tomáš Sedláček scored the winner in the 2nd leg with only seconds to spare. In their group Mladá Boleslav defeated IF Elfsborg 3–1, but again failed to reach the knockout stages of the competition after losing matches against Villarreal 1–2, AEK Athens 0–1 and Fiorentina 1–2. The club subsequently achieved a 7th place league finish in the 2007–08 season, missing out on European cups.

==== 2010s–2020s ====
The club's greatest successes in the following years included winning the Czech Cup in the 2010–11 and 2015–16 seasons. In the league, the club was among the wider top teams from 2010 to 2017, finishing on the third place once and on the fourth place several times. These results guaranteed FK Mladá Boleslav a place in the qualifying rounds of European cups, but the club never managed to advance to the group stage during this era.

In 2018–19, the new format of the Czech First League with division into three groups after the regular season was introduced. In that season FK Mladá Boleslav finished 7th, but won the play-offs for participation in the 2019–20 UEFA Europa League qualifying rounds. The top goalscorer of the 2018–19 season was Mladá Boleslav's Nikolay Komlichenko with 29 goals, which became the league record for goals scored in a single season. In January 2020, Komlichenko transferred to FC Dinamo Moscow for a fee of around €3.5 million, a record in the club's history.

In 2018–2023, the club finished in the middle of the league table each time. In the 2023–24 season, the club finished in fifth place and, after a five-year break, made it to the European cups. After the season, David Trunda bought a majority stake (51 %) in the club and became its president, ending the 21-year era of Josef Dufek. The city of Mladá Boleslav owns 34 % of the shares. In 2024–25 UEFA Conference League, FK Mladá Boleslav advanced through three qualifying rounds to the league phase of the competition. In 2024–25, Mladá Boleslav finished 12th, which was the worst result since the first season in the Czech First League.

In January 2026, Matyáš Vojta transferred from Mladá Boleslav to AC Sparta Prague for €4 million, which is the highest amount in the club's history and the highest for a transfer within the Czech First League.

=== Historical names ===
Until 1949, there were three clubs in Mladá Boleslav: Mladoboleslavský SK, Aston Villa Mladá Boleslav and Slavoj Mladá Boleslav. The current club follows the tradition of all three predecessors.

  - 1902 – Studentská XI Mladá Boleslav
    - 1907 – S.K. Mladá Boleslav (Sportovní klub Bohemians Mladá Boleslav)
    - 1910 – Mladoboleslavský SK (Mladoboleslavský sportovní klub)
  - 1919 – SK Aston Villa Mladá Boleslav
  - 1919 – TJ Slavoj Mladá Boleslav
- 1949 – ZSJ AZNP Mladá Boleslav (Závodní sokolská jednota Automobilové závody národní podnik Mladá Boleslav)
- 1950 – TJ Spartak Mladá Boleslav (Tělovýchovná jednota Spartak Mladá Boleslav)
- 1966 – TJ Auto Škoda Mladá Boleslav (Tělovýchovná jednota Auto Škoda Mladá Boleslav)
- 1990 – FK Mladá Boleslav (Fotbalový klub Mladá Boleslav)
- 1992 – FK Slavia Mladá Boleslav (Fotbalový klub Slavia Mladá Boleslav)
- 1994 – FK Bohemians Mladá Boleslav (Fotbalový klub Bohemians Mladá Boleslav)
- 1995 – FK Mladá Boleslav (Fotbalový klub Mladá Boleslav)

== Players ==
=== Current squad ===
As of 8 September 2026.

Note: Flags indicate national team as defined under FIFA eligibility rules; some limited exceptions apply. Players may hold more than one non-FIFA nationality.

No.	Pos.	Nation	Player
1	GK	CZE	Marek Obdržálek
3	DF	SVK	Martin Králik
5	DF	CZE	Jan Harušťák (on loan from Baník Ostrava)
9	FW	SVK	Lukáš Letenay (on loan from Slovan Liberec)
10	MF	CZE	Filip Lehký
11	DF	CZE	Matěj Hybš
13	DF	CZE	Denis Donát
14	MF	CZE	Samuel Grygar (on loan from Baník Ostrava)
17	FW	CZE	Filip Špatenka (on loan from Slovan Liberec)
18	MF	CZE	Marek Havran (on loan from Baník Ostrava)
19	MF	CZE	David Kozel
20	MF	NGR	Solomon John
21	MF	CZE	Martin Šubert
23	FW	CZE	Jiří Klíma
24	DF	CZE	Dominik Mareš

No.	Pos.	Nation	Player
26	DF	CZE	Matěj Zachoval
27	DF	CZE	Adam Kadlec (on loan from Viktoria Plzeň)
28	MF	CZE	Daniel Langhamer
32	DF	CZE	Filip Matoušek
38	DF	CZE	Filip Kolář
41	MF	CZE	Jan Jinoch
42	GK	CZE	Vojtěch Vorel
44	DF	CZE	Ondřej Karafiát
49	MF	CZE	Josef Kolářík
59	GK	CZE	Jiří Floder
70	FW	CZE	Jan Buryán
76	MF	CZE	Jan Zíka
77	MF	CZE	David Pech
90	MF	NGR	Victor Ogungbayi

=== Out on loan ===
Note: Flags indicate national team as defined under FIFA eligibility rules; some limited exceptions apply. Players may hold more than one non-FIFA nationality.

No.	Pos.	Nation	Player
—	DF	CZE	Tomáš Král (at Slovácko)
—	GK	CZE	David Kořán (at Vlašim)
—	FW	CZE	Roman Teterja (at Vlašim)
—	MF	CZE	Lukáš Fila (at Příbram)
—	MF	CZE	Nicolas Penner (at Příbram)
—	FW	CZE	Matouš Krulich (at Příbram)

No.	Pos.	Nation	Player
—	GK	MKD	Stefan Jovanoski (at Opava)
—	MF	CZE	Denis Kaulfus (at Viktoria Žižkov)
—	MF	CZE	Jakub Vlček (at Viktoria Žižkov)
—	DF	CZE	Adam Zouhar (at Arsenal Česká Lípa)
—	MF	CZE	Filip Káža (at Arsenal Česká Lípa)

== Player records in the Czech First League ==
As of 18 September 2026.

Highlighted players are in the current squad.

=== Most appearances ===
#	Name	Matches
1	(Czech Republic) Marek Matějovský	287
2	(Czech Republic) Tomáš Ladra	223
3	(Czech Republic) Jan Kysela	220
4	(Czech Republic) Miroslav Miller	211
5	(Czech Republic) Jan Šeda	188
6	(Czech Republic) Jan Chramosta	182
7	(Czech Republic) Ondřej Kúdela	177
8	(Czech Republic) Jakub Fulnek	146
9	(Czech Republic) Adrian Rolko	144
10	(Czech Republic) Lukáš Magera	130

=== Most goals ===
#	Name	Goals
1	(Czech Republic) Jan Chramosta	49
2	(Russia) Nikolay Komlichenko	43
3	(Czech Republic) Lukáš Magera	35
4	(Czech Republic) Marek Kulič	34
5	(Czech Republic) Luboš Pecka	33
6	(Czech Republic) Tomáš Ladra	32
7	(Bosnia and Herzegovina) Jasmin Šćuk	27
8	(Czech Republic) Marek Matějovský	23
9	(Czech Republic) Ondřej Zahustel	21
10	(Czech Republic) Jiří Klíma	20

=== Most clean sheets ===
#	Name	Clean sheets
1	(Czech Republic) Miroslav Miller	64
2	(Czech Republic) Jan Šeda	51
3	(Czech Republic) Jakub Diviš	14

== Current technical staff ==
- Technical director: Jiří Plíšek
- Assistant coaches: Marek Jarolím, Jan Jelínek
- Goalkeeping coach: Kamil Čontofalský

== Managers ==
Karel Jarolím coached the most matches for Mladá Boleslav (122), followed by Dušan Uhrin, Jr. (117) and Jozef Weber (92). In 2024, Swedish coach Andreas Brännström became the first foreign coach in the history of FK Mladá Boleslav.

- Karel Stanner (1996–01)
- Vlastimil Petržela (2002)
- Martin Pulpit (2002–04)
- Milan Bokša (2004)
- Dušan Uhrin, Jr. (July 2004 – June 2007)
- Zdeněk Ščasný (Sep 2007 – March 2008)
- Karel Stanner (March 2008 – June 2008)
- Pavel Hapal (June 2008 – June 2009)
- Dušan Uhrin, Jr. (July 2009 – Dec 2009)
- Karel Stanner (Jan 2010 – May 2011)
- Miroslav Koubek (July 2011 – Sept 2012)
- Ladislav Minář (Sep 2012 – Jan 2014)
- Karel Jarolím (Jan 2014 – Aug 2016)
- Leoš Kalvoda (Aug 2016 – Dec 2016)
- Martin Svědík (Dec 2016 – June 2017)
- Dušan Uhrin, Jr. (June 2017 – Feb 2018)
- Jozef Weber (Feb 2018 – Dec 2020)
- Karel Jarolím (Dec 2020 – Feb 2022)
- Pavel Hoftych (Feb 2022 – May 2023)
- Marek Kulič (June 2023 – Dec 2023)
- David Holoubek (Jan 2024 – Aug 2024)
- Andreas Brännström (Aug 2024 – Apr 2025)
- Josef Jinoch (Apr 2025 – May 2025)
- Aleš Majer (June 2025 – present)

== History in domestic competitions ==
- 1993–95 Bohemian Football League
- 1995–97 Czech Fourth Division
- 1997–98 Bohemian Football League
- 1998–04 Czech 2. Liga
- 2004– Czech First League

- Seasons spent at Level 1 of the football league system: 21
- Seasons spent at Level 2 of the football league system: 6
- Seasons spent at Level 3 of the football league system: 3
- Seasons spent at Level 4 of the football league system: 2

=== Czech Republic ===
Season	League	Placed	Pld	W	D	L	GF	GA	GD	Pts	Cup
1993–94	3. liga	9th	34	7	17	10	38	46	–8	31	Round of 32
1994–95	3. liga	15th	34	7	12	15	34	53	–19	33	Round of 64
1995–96	4. liga	9th	30	11	7	12	41	38	+3	40	First round
1996–97	4. liga	1st	30	23	6	1	67	16	+51	75	First round
1997–98	3. liga	1st	34	19	7	8	41	26	+15	64	Round of 32
1998–99	2. liga	10th	30	9	7	14	23	30	–7	34	Round of 16
1999–00	2. liga	13th	30	7	12	11	31	40	–9	33	Round of 64
2000–01	2. liga	11th	30	9	9	12	34	42	–8	36	First round
2001–02	2. liga	3rd	30	15	7	8	40	29	+11	52	Quarter-finals
2002–03	2. liga	3rd	30	13	11	6	37	22	+15	50	First round
2003–04	2. liga	1st	30	16	7	7	50	24	+26	55	Round of 64
2004–05	1. liga	14th	30	6	13	11	26	35	–9	31	Round of 16
2005–06	1. liga	2nd	30	16	6	8	50	36	+14	54	Round of 64
2006–07	1. liga	3rd	30	17	7	6	48	27	+21	58	Quarter-finals
2007–08	1. liga	7th	30	11	9	10	37	36	+1	42	Round of 16
2008–09	1. liga	6th	30	12	10	8	39	38	+1	46	Round of 64
2009–10	1. liga	8th	30	11	6	13	47	41	+6	39	Round of 64
2010–11	1. liga	5th	30	13	7	10	49	40	+9	46	Winners
2011–12	1. liga	4th	30	15	5	10	49	34	+15	50	Quarter-finals
2012–13	1. liga	8th	30	10	8	12	34	43	–9	38	Runners-up
2013–14	1. liga	3rd	30	14	8	8	54	38	+16	50	Quarter-finals
2014–15	1. liga	4th	30	13	7	10	43	34	+9	46	Semi-finals
2015–16	1. liga	4th	30	16	9	5	63	37	+26	57	Winners
2016–17	1. liga	4th	30	13	10	7	47	37	+10	49	Semi-finals
2017–18	1. liga	9th	30	9	7	14	31	43	–12	34	Semi-finals
2018–19	1. liga	7th	35	14	10	11	66	48	+18	52	Round of 32
2019–20	1. liga	7th	35	14	7	14	56	57	–1	49	Quarter-finals
2020–21	1. liga	11th	34	10	9	15	49	54	–5	39	Quarter-finals
2021–22	1. liga	7th	34	14	6	14	53	53	0	48	Quarter-finals
2022–23	1. liga	9th	32	9	11	12	39	44	–5	38	Round of 16
2023–24	1. liga	5th	36	14	8	14	54	60	–6	50	Round of 16
2024–25	1. liga	12th	35	11	8	16	48	48	0	41	Round of 16
2025–26	1. liga	13th	35	9	13	13	49	57	–8	40	Semi-finals

== History in European competitions ==
Season	Competition	Round	Opponent	Home	Away	Aggregate
2006–07	UEFA Champions League	2Q	(Norway) Vålerenga	3–1	2–2	5–3
2006–07	UEFA Champions League	3Q	(Turkey) Galatasaray	1–1	2–5	3–6
2006–07	UEFA Cup	1R	(France) Marseille	4–2	0–1	4–3
2006–07	UEFA Cup	Group G	(Greece) Panathinaikos	0–1	—N/a	5th
2006–07	UEFA Cup	Group G	(Romania) Rapid București	—N/a	1–1	5th
2006–07	UEFA Cup	Group G	(France) Paris Saint-Germain	0–0	—N/a	5th
2006–07	UEFA Cup	Group G	(Israel) Hapoel Tel Aviv	—N/a	1–1	5th
2007–08	UEFA Cup	1R	(Italy) Palermo	0–1	1–0 (a.e.t.)	1–1 (4–2 p)
2007–08	UEFA Cup	Group C	(Spain) Villarreal	1–2	—N/a	4th
2007–08	UEFA Cup	Group C	(Sweden) Elfsborg	—N/a	3–1	4th
2007–08	UEFA Cup	Group C	(Greece) AEK Athens	0–1	—N/a	4th
2007–08	UEFA Cup	Group C	(Italy) Fiorentina	—N/a	1–2	4th
2011–12	UEFA Europa League	3Q	(Cyprus) AEK Larnaca	2–2	0–3	2–5
2012–13	UEFA Europa League	2Q	(Iceland) Þór Akureyri	3–0	1–0	4–0
2012–13	UEFA Europa League	3Q	(Netherlands) Twente	0–2	0–2	0–4
2014–15	UEFA Europa League	2Q	(Bosnia and Herzegovina) Široki Brijeg	2–1	4–0	6–1
2014–15	UEFA Europa League	3Q	(France) Lyon	1–4	1–2	2–6
2015–16	UEFA Europa League	2Q	(Norway) Strømsgodset	1–2	1–0	2–2 (a.g.)
2016–17	UEFA Europa League	3Q	(North Macedonia) Shkëndija	1–0	0–2	1–2
2017–18	UEFA Europa League	2Q	(Republic of Ireland) Shamrock Rovers	2–0	3–2	5–2
2017–18	UEFA Europa League	3Q	(Albania) Skënderbeu	2–1	1–2 (a.e.t.)	3–3 (2–4 p)
2019–20	UEFA Europa League	2Q	(Kazakhstan) Ordabasy	1–1	3–2	4–3
2019–20	UEFA Europa League	3Q	(Romania) FCSB	0–1	0–0	0–1
2024–25	UEFA Conference League	2Q	(Lithuania) TransINVEST	2–0	1–0	3–0
2024–25	UEFA Conference League	3Q	(Israel) Hapoel Be'er Sheva	1–1	4–2	5–3
2024–25	UEFA Conference League	PO	(Hungary) Paks	2–2	3–0	5–2
2024–25	UEFA Conference League	LP	(Armenia) Noah	—N/a	0–2	27th
2024–25	UEFA Conference League	LP	(Switzerland) Lugano	0–1	—N/a	27th
2024–25	UEFA Conference League	LP	(Portugal) Vitória de Guimarães	—N/a	1–2	27th
2024–25	UEFA Conference League	LP	(Spain) Real Betis	2–1	—N/a	27th
2024–25	UEFA Conference League	LP	(Poland) Jagiellonia Białystok	1–0	—N/a	27th
2024–25	UEFA Conference League	LP	(Norway) Molde	—N/a	3–4	27th

Notes

- 2Q: Second qualifying round
- 3Q: Third qualifying round
- PO: Play-off round
- LP: League phase

== Honours ==
- Czech 2. Liga
  - Winners: 2003–04
- Bohemian Football League
  - Winners: 1997–98
- Czech Cup
  - Winners: 2010–11, 2015–16

== Club records ==
=== Czech First League records ===
- Best position: 2nd (2005–06)
- Worst position: 14th (2004–05)
- Biggest home win: Mladá Boleslav 6–0 Příbram (2019–20)
- Biggest away win: Teplice 0–8 Mladá Boleslav (2018–19)
- Biggest home defeat: Mladá Boleslav 0–5 Sparta (2023–24), Mladá Boleslav 0–5 Plzeň (2025–26)
- Biggest away defeat: Plzeň 7–1 Mladá Boleslav (2019–20)

In the 2023–24 season, the highest number of goals in one game in the history of the Czech First League was seen in the match Zlín–Mladá Boleslav, which ended 5–9.

=== Record departures ===
#	Player	To	Fee	Year
1	(Czech Republic) Matyáš Vojta	(Czech Republic) Sparta Prague	€4.0 million	2026
2	(Russia) Nikolay Komlichenko	(Russia) Dynamo Moscow	€3.5 million (Note: estimated amount)	2020
3	(Czech Republic) Vasil Kušej	(Czech Republic) Slavia Prague	€2.5 million	2025
4	(Czech Republic) Marek Matějovský	(England) Reading	€1.9 million	2008
5	(Czech Republic) Jiří Skalák	(England) Brighton & Hove Albion	€1.7 million	2016

== Hall of Fame ==
The members of the FK Mladá Boleslav's Hall of Fame are:

- Josef Donát, journalist
- Jiří Holakovský, player and office-bearer
- Radim Holub, player
- Pavlín Paša Jirků, referee
- Jaroslav Král, politician
- Jiří Macháček, player and goalkeeper coach
- Marek Matějovský, player
- Miroslav Miller, player
- Luboš Pecka, player
- Tomáš Sedláček, player
- Jiří Šimáně, businessman
- Miloslav Venera, player and youth coach
