= 2026–27 FC Zbrojovka Brno season =

FC Zbrojovka Brno
2026–27 season
- General manager: Jan Mynář
- Manager: Martin Svědík
- Stadium: ShipEX Arena
- Chance liga: 6th
- Czech Cup: Fourth round
- Top goalscorer: League: Daniel Vašulín (4); All: Daniel Vašulín (4)
- Highest home attendance: 10,600, 25 July 2026 v Sparta Prague (league)
- Lowest home attendance: 7,183, 29 August 2026 v Zlín (league)
- Average home league attendance: 8,603
- Biggest win: 3–1, 25 July 2026 v Sparta Prague
- Biggest defeat: 0–4, 7 August 2026 v Slavia Prague
Home colours	Away colours	Third colours

The 2026–27 FC Zbrojovka Brno season is the club's 27th season in the Czech First League. The team is competing in Czech First League and the Czech Cup.
The club secured participation in the Chance Liga on April 20, 2026 by winning the 2025–26 Czech National Football League. With 76 points, the club equaled FC Synot's points record from the 1999-2000 Czech National Football League season.

== Changes ==
=== Visual identity ===
In June 2026, FC Zbrojovka Brno unveiled a comprehensive new visual identity and a redesigned club crest. Created in collaboration with the regional agency Boldie Collective, the rebranding introduces a modern shield-shaped logo featuring traditional red stripes, the letter Z, and the "ZB" monogram, while maintaining respect for the club's history and Moravian roots.

=== Technical staff ===
In August 2026, Tomáš Požár was appointed as the new Head of Scouting at FC Zbrojovka Brno. Drawing on his previous experience as a sports director at clubs like Sparta Prague and Bohemians, as well as working with the Czech Football Association (FAČR), his main objective is to systematically scout and analyze potential player reinforcements, with a particular focus on foreign markets. Zbrojovka strengthened its medical and performance department and club academy with new expert additions. The onboarding of specialists such as Jindřich Vampola as head of the academy's health and performance unit, fitness coach Rafael Gáll, and physiotherapist Alžběta Klímová Stehlíková aims to improve training standards, data analysis, and overall player development across all age categories.

=== Partnership ===
In June 2026, FC Zbrojovka Brno entered into an official cooperation agreement with Kroměříž for the upcoming season. The partnership aims to support the athletic development of young players by providing them with regular playing time and professional experience in the Czech Second League through loan deals. In July 2026, Zbrojovka entered into a strategic partnership with Dutch club AZ Alkmaar. The long-term cooperation focuses primarily on the development of youth academies, player training systems, and the sharing of professional know-how and methodology.

== First team squad ==
As of 8 September 2026.

Note: Flags indicate national team as defined under FIFA eligibility rules; some limited exceptions apply. Players may hold more than one non-FIFA nationality.

No.	Pos.	Nation	Player
1	GK	SVK	Adam Hrdina
3	DF	BRA	Kaká
4	DF	CZE	Eric Hunal
6	MF	CZE	Lukáš Penxa
7	MF	CZE	Štěpán Langer
8	MF	CZE	Patrik Čavoš
9	FW	CZE	Oliver Velich
10	MF	CZE	Antonín Vaníček
11	MF	SVK	Martin Rymarenko
14	MF	CZE	Tadeáš Vachoušek (on loan from Teplice)
15	FW	CZE	Daniel Vašulín
17	MF	CZE	Jaromír Zmrhal
18	DF	CZE	Denis Granečný
19	FW	BDI	Bienvenue Kanakimana
20	MF	CZE	Lukas Saal

No.	Pos.	Nation	Player
21	FW	CZE	Filip Večeřa
23	MF	CZE	Petr Ševčík
24	GK	CZE	Dominik Sváček
25	DF	CZE	Tomáš Břečka
26	DF	CZE	Filip Vedral
29	MF	CZE	Patrik Žitný
30	GK	CZE	Colin Andrew
32	DF	CZE	Jan Juroška
38	DF	CZE	Jakub Pokorný
39	DF	CZE	Jakub Klíma
44	DF	MLI	Amadou Dante
68	MF	CZE	Jakub Janetzký
77	FW	NGR	Lucky Ezeh
78	GK	CZE	Ondřej Prodělal
79	MF	NGR	Afolabi Soliu (on loan from Slovan Liberec)

=== Out on loan ===
Note: Flags indicate national team as defined under FIFA eligibility rules; some limited exceptions apply. Players may hold more than one non-FIFA nationality.

No.	Pos.	Nation	Player
—	DF	CZE	Zdeněk Toman (at Kroměříž)
—	MF	CZE	David Polášek (at Kroměříž)
—	MF	CZE	Daniel Polák (at Kroměříž)
—	DF	SRB	Alex Marković (at Karviná)

No.	Pos.	Nation	Player
—	FW	CZE	Martin Černý (at Třinec)
—	MF	MKD	Martin Gjorgievski (at Dukla Banská Bystrica)
—	DF	CZE	Daniel Kutík (at Zlaté Moravce)
—	FW	TTO	Justin Araujo-Wilson (at Atlético Ottawa)

== Transfers ==
=== In ===
Pos	Player	Transferred from	Fee	Window	Date	Source
FW	(Czech Republic) Daniel Vašulín	(Czech Republic) Viktoria Plzeň	Undisclosed	Summer	3 June 2026	
MF	(Czech Republic) Petr Ševčík	(Czech Republic) Slavia Prague	Free transfer	Summer	5 June 2026	
MF	(Czech Republic) Jaromír Zmrhal	(Cyprus) Apollon Limassol	Free transfer	Summer	5 June 2026	
FW	(Nigeria) Lucky Ezeh	(Czech Republic) Karviná	Undisclosed	Summer	13 June 2026	
DF	(Czech Republic) Eric Hunal	(Czech Republic) Slavia Prague	Undisclosed ^{(buy-back option)}	Summer	23 June 2026	
DF	(Czech Republic) Lukáš Penxa	(Czech Republic) Sparta Prague	Undisclosed ^{(buy-back option)}	Summer	23 June 2026	
DF	(Mali) Amadou Dante	(Portugal) Arouca	Undisclosed	Summer	17 July 2026	
FW	(Czech Republic) Antonín Vaníček	(Czech Republic) České Budějovice	€100,000	Summer	17 July 2026	
DF	(Czech Republic) Jakub Pokorný	(Greece) Kifisia	Free transfer	Summer	26 August 2026	
FW	(Nigeria) Afolabi Soliu	(Czech Republic) Liberec	Loan^{(without option)}	Summer	9 September 2026	

=== Out ===
Pos	Player	Transferred to	Fee	Window	Date	Source
DF	(Czech Republic) Stanislav Hofmann	Retirement	End of career	Summer	21 May 2026	
MF	(Czech Republic) Lukáš Vorlický	(Czech Republic) Slavia Prague	End of loan	Summer	22 June 2026	
MF	(Czech Republic) Filip Blecha	(Czech Republic) Česká Lípa	Undisclosed	Summer	23 June 2026	
MF	(Czech Republic) Daniel Polák	(Czech Republic) Kroměříž	Loan ^{(without option)}	Summer	28 June 2026	
MF	(Czech Republic) David Polášek	(Czech Republic) Kroměříž	Loan ^{(without option)}	Summer	30 June 2026	
FW	(Czech Republic) Adam Kronus	(Czech Republic) Karviná	Undisclosed	Summer	2 July 2026	
MF	(Czech Republic) Jan Hellebrand	(Czech Republic) Mladcová	Free transfer	Summer	7 July 2026	
MF	(Czech Republic) Jakub Selnar	(Czech Republic) Karviná	Undisclosed	Summer	16 July 2026	
MF	(Czech Republic) Jiří Texl	(Czech Republic) Zbrojovka "B"	Internal	Summer	29 July 2026	
DF	(Serbia) Alex Marković	(Czech Republic) Karviná	Loan ^{(with option)}	Summer	30 June 2026	
DF	(Czech Republic) Petr Mareš	(Czech Republic) Žižkov	Free transfer	Summer	31 August 2026	
MF	(North Macedonia) Martin Gjorgievski	(Czech Republic) Banská Bystrica	Loan ^{(without option)}	Summer	11 September 2026	

=== Overall transfer activity ===
==== Expenditure ====
Summer: ▼€100,000

Total: ▼€100,000

==== Income ====
Summer: ▲€0

Total: ▲€0

==== Net totals ====
Summer: ▼€100,000

Total: ▼€100,000

== Friendly matches ==
=== Pre-season ===
June 23, 2026 Friendly	Zbrojovka Brno	4–1	Prostějov	Brno
17:00 CEST (UTC+2)	Vašulín 35' Vachoušek 47' Velich 59' Penxa 84'	Report	Matoušek 87'	Stadium: Městský fotbalový stadion Srbská

June 30, 2026 Friendly	Nyíregyháza	0–3	Zbrojovka Brno	Vorau
17:00 CEST (UTC+2)		Report	Žitný 45', 54' Vašulín 63'	Stadium: Urkraft Arena; Referee: Grasser

July 1, 2026 Friendly	Tiszakécske	2–4	Zbrojovka Brno	Vorau
17:00 CEST (UTC+2)	Kócs-Washburn 40' Gyenes 71'	Report	Vašulín 8' Večeřa 42' Kanakimana 47' Žitný 87' (pen.)	Stadium: Urkraft Arena; Referee: Schnur

July 4, 2026 Friendly	Csíkszereda	1–2	Zbrojovka Brno	Vorau
17:00 CEST (UTC+2)	Hegedűs 37'	Report	Vedral 42' Vachoušek 73'	Stadium: Urkraft Arena; Referee: Edlinger

July 4, 2026 Friendly	Hartberg	2–0	Zbrojovka Brno	Hartberg
: CEST (UTC+2)	Hoffmann 23' Komposch 75'	Report		Stadium: Stadion Hartberg; Referee: Vukota

July 17, 2026 Friendly	Zbrojovka Brno	2–0	Podbrezová	Rosice
17:00 CEST (UTC+2)	Kaká 36'; Vašulín 66'	Report		Stadium: Stadion FC Slovan Rosice; Attendance: 350; Referee: Mach

October 2, 2026 Friendly	Zbrojovka Brno	5–1	Skalica	Rosice
11:00 CEST (UTC+2)	Rymarenko 28'; Soliu 33', 35'; Velich 68'; Žitný 73'	Report	Morong (yellow card) 21'; Daniel 48' (pen.); Černek (yellow card) 84'	Stadium: Stadion FC Slovan Rosice

== Competitions ==
Win Draw Loss

=== Overview ===
Competition	First match	Last match	Starting round	Record							
Competition	First match	Last match	Starting round	Pld	W	D	L	GF	GA	GD	Win %
Chance liga	25 July 2026		Matchday 1	14	6	2	6	17	22	−5	42.86
MOL Cup	26 August 2026	27 October 2026	Second round	3	2	0	1	13	4	+9	66.67
Total				17	8	2	7	30	26	+4	47.06

Source: Competitions

=== Fortuna národní liga ===
==== Results summary ====
Overall								Home						Away					
Pld	W	D	L	GF	GA	GD	Pts	W	D	L	GF	GA	GD	W	D	L	GF	GA	GD
14	6	2	6	17	22	−5	20	4	1	3	12	11	+1	2	1	3	5	11	−6

Last updated: 20 November 2026.

==== Results by round ====
Round	1	2	3	4	5	6	7	8	9	10	11	12	13	14	15	16	17	18	19	20	21	22	23	24	25	26	27	28	29	30
Ground	H	A	H	H	A	H	A	H	A	H	A	H	A	H																
Result	W	D	L	W	W	W	L	W	L	L	W	D	L	L																
Position	3-5	5	7	4	3	2	6	4	6	8	6	7	9	10																
Points	3	4	4	7	10	13	13	16	16	16	19	20	20	20																

Updated to match(es) played on 20 November 2026. Source:
A = Away; H = Home; W = Win; D = Draw; L = Loss

==== League table ====
Pos	Team	Pld	W	D	L	GF	GA	GD	Pts	Qualification or relegation
8	Viktoria Plzeň	14	5	5	4	29	22	+7	20	Qualification for the middle group
9	Bohemians 1905	14	5	5	4	15	15	0	20	Qualification for the middle group
10	Zbrojovka Brno	14	6	2	6	17	22	−5	20	Qualification for the middle group
11	Hradec Králové	14	5	3	6	17	18	−1	18	Qualification for the relegation group
12	Pardubice	14	5	2	7	19	20	−1	17	Qualification for the relegation group

Updated to match(es) played on 8 November 2026. Source: Chance Liga
Rules for classification: 1) Points; 2) Head-to-head points; 3) Head-to-head goal difference; 4) Head-to-head goals scored; 5) Goal difference; 6) Goals scored; 7) Fair-play ranking; 8) Draw.

==== Results ====
25 July 2026 1	Zbrojovka Brno	3–1	Sparta Praha	Brno
20:00 CEST (UTC+2)	Vašulín 34'; Vachoušek 64'; Ezeh 81'; Svědík (yellow card) 90+6' (manager)	Report	Mercado 50'	Stadium: ShipEx Arena; Attendance: 10,600; Referee: Jan Beneš

1 August 2026 2	Viktoria Plzeň	1–1	Zbrojovka Brno	Plzeň
20:00 CEST (UTC+2)	Kabongo 14'; Pirgić (yellow card) 45+2'	Report	Saal (yellow card) 2'; Vašulín 58'; Dante (yellow card) 49'; Vaníček (yellow card) 90+2'	Stadium: Doosan Arena; Attendance: 10,108; Referee: Dominik Starý

7 August 2026 3	Zbrojovka Brno	0–1	Slovan Liberec	Brno
19:00 CEST (UTC+2)	Čavoš (yellow card) 72'	Report	Faye (yellow card) 29'; Dulay 61'; Stránský (yellow card) 85'; Soliu (yellow card) 90+1'	Stadium: ShipEX Arena; Attendance: 7,945; Referee: Lukáš Nehasil

23 August 2026 5	Teplice	0–2	Zbrojovka Brno	Teplice
17:00 CEST (UTC+2)		Report	Janetzký (yellow card) 28'; Vaníček 41', 72'; Vaníček (yellow card) 64'	Stadium: Na Stínadlech; Attendance: 5,478; Referee: Matěj Kubečka

29 August 2026 6	Zbrojovka Brno	3–2	Zlín	Brno
17:00 CEST (UTC+2)	Vašulín 23'; Svědík (yellow card) 57' (manager); Kopečný 59' (o.g.); Zavadil (yellow card) 87' (assistant coach); Vedral 90+3'	Report	Kopečný (yellow card) 30'; Fukala 58'; Černín 86'; Appiah (yellow card) 90+2'; Hellebrand (red card) 90+10'	Stadium: ShipEx Arena; Attendance: 7,183; Referee: Antonín Bohata

2 September 2026 4	Zbrojovka Brno	1–0	Hradec Králové	Brno
18:00 CEST (UTC+2)	Vašulín 61'; Svědík (yellow card) 90+3' (manager)	Report		Stadium: ShipEX Arena; Attendance: 7,714; Referee: Daniel Lovětínský

5 September 2026 7	Slavia Prague	4–0	Zbrojovka Brno	Prague
15:00 CEST (UTC+2)	Chorý 38' (pen.), 65'; Chaloupek (yellow card) 42'; Šturm (yellow card) 45'; Ayaosi 76'; Jurásek 88'	Report	Vachoušek (yellow card) 31'; Klíma (yellow card) 36'; Kanakimana (yellow card) 72'	Stadium: Fortuna Arena; Attendance: 19,122; Referee: Jan Beneš

12 September 2026 8	Zbrojovka Brno	2–1	Artis Brno	Brno
15:00 CEST (UTC+2)	Vaníček 15'; Penxa 41'; Saal (yellow card) 90+3'; Granečný (yellow card) 90+4'	Report	Ndiaye 69'; Alégué (yellow card) 90+1'	Stadium: ShipEX Arena; Attendance: 9,573; Referee: Pavel Orel

19 September 2026 9	Mladá Boleslav	2–0	Zbrojovka Brno	Mladá Boleslav
15:00 CEST (UTC+2)	Šubert 7'; Klíma 50'; Matoušek (yellow card) 64'; Floder (yellow card) 68'	Report		Stadium: Lokotrans Aréna; Attendance: 2,866; Referee: Dominik Starý

10 October 2026 10	Zbrojovka Brno	0–1	Jablonec	Brno
15:00 CEST (UTC+2)	Dante (yellow card) 43'; Langer (yellow card) 68'	Report	Hollý (yellow card) 68'; Růsek 85'; Kozel (yellow card) 87' (manager)	Stadium: ShipEX Arena; Attendance: 6,680; Referee: Daniel Vokoun

18 October 2026 11	Slovácko	1–2	Zbrojovka Brno	Uherské Hradiště
13:00 CEST (UTC+2)	Behiratche (yellow card) 59'; Behiratche 90+4'	Report	Vašulín 40' (pen.); Vachoušek 76'	Stadium: Městský fotbalový stadion Miroslava Valenty; Attendance: 6,035; Referee: Vojtěch Opočenský

24 October 2026 12	Zbrojovka Brno	2–2	Bohemians 1905	Brno
15:00 CEST (UTC+2)	Dante 2'; Penxa 74'	Report	Kadlec (yellow card) 9'; Čermák 48'; Květ 83'	Stadium: ShipEX Arena; Attendance: 6,388; Referee: Marek Radina

31 October 2026 13	Sigma Olomouc	3–0	Zbrojovka Brno	Olomouc
18:00 CET (UTC+1)	Borges (yellow card) 3'; Sejk 21', 76' (pen.); Soldo 58'	Report	Pokorný (yellow card) 36'; Kaká (yellow card) 47'; Vedral (yellow card) 53'	Stadium: Andrův stadion Attendance: 6,774; Referee: Stanislav Volek

7 November 2026 14	Zbrojovka Brno	1–3	Baník Ostrava	Brno
18:00 CET (UTC+1)	Langer 48'; Klíma (yellow card) 72'	Report	Kubala 23', 25', 75' (pen.) (yellow card) 81'; Nogha (yellow card) 50'; Planka (yellow card) 72'	Stadium: ShipEX Arena; Attendance: 8,350; Referee: Ondřej Berka

22 November 2026 15	Pardubice	v	Zbrojovka Brno	Pardubice
13:00 CEST (UTC+2)				Stadium: CFIG Arena

29 November 2026 16	Zbrojovka Brno	v	Viktoria Plzeň	Brno
15:00 CEST (UTC+2)				Stadium: ShipEX Arena

5 December 2026 17	Slovan Liberec	v	Zbrojovka Brno	Liberec
--:-- CEST (UTC+2)				Stadium: Stadion u Nisy

12 December 2026 18	Hradec Králové	v	Zbrojovka Brno	Hradec Králové
--:-- CEST (UTC+2)				Stadium: Malšovická Aréna

30 January 2027 19	Zbrojovka Brno	v	Teplice	Brno
--:-- CEST (UTC+2)				Stadium: ShipEX Arena

6 February 2027 20	Zlín	v	Zbrojovka Brno	Zlín
--:-- CEST (UTC+2)				Stadium: Stadion Letná

13 February 2027 21	Zbrojovka Brno	v	Slavia Prague	Brno
--:-- CEST (UTC+2)				Stadium: ShipEX Arena

20 February 2027 22	Artis Brno	v	Zbrojovka Brno	Brno
--:-- CEST (UTC+2)				Stadium: ShipEX Arena

27 February 2027 23	Zbrojovka Brno	v	Mladá Boleslav	Brno
--:-- CEST (UTC+2)				Stadium: ShipEX Arena

6 March 2027 24	Jablonec	v	Zbrojovka Brno	Jablonec nad Nisou
--:-- CEST (UTC+2)				Stadium: Stadion Střelnice

13 March 2027 25	Zbrojovka Brno	v	Slovácko	Brno
--:-- CEST (UTC+2)				Stadium: ShipEX Arena

20 March 2027 26	Bohemians 1905	v	Zbrojovka Brno	Prague
--:-- CEST (UTC+2)				Stadium: Ďolíček

3 April 2027 27	Zbrojovka Brno	v	Sigma Olomouc	Brno
--:-- CEST (UTC+2)				Stadium: ShipEX Arena

10 April 2027 28	Baník Ostrava	v	Zbrojovka Brno	Ostrava
--:-- CEST (UTC+2)				Stadium: Městský stadion vítkovických rytířů

17 April 2027 29	Zbrojovka Brno	v	Pardubice	Brno
--:-- CEST (UTC+2)				Stadium: ShipEX Arena

24 April 2027 30	Sparta Prague	v	Zbrojovka Brno	Prague
--:-- CEST (UTC+2)				Stadium: epet ARENA

=== Czech Cup ===
==== Results ====
26 August 2026 Second round	Frýdlant nad Ostravicí (4)	0–10	Zbrojovka Brno	Frýdlant nad Ostravicí
17:30 CEST (UTC+2)	Šustai (yellow card) 54'	Report	Kanakimana 6', 33'; Velich 11', 88'; Langer 16'; Vachoušek 45'; Granečný 51', 80'; Gjorgievski 64', 65'	Stadium: Stadion BFK Frýdlant nad Ostravicí; Attendance: 1,670; Referee: Stanislav Volek

16 September 2026 Third round	FK Králův Dvůr (3)	0–3	Zbrojovka Brno	Králův Dvůr
16:00 CEST (UTC+2)	Provod (yellow card) 64'	Report	Kanakimana 6'; Bouček 16' (o.g.); Ezeh 52'	Stadium: Městský stadion Králův Dvůr; Attendance: 960; Referee: Matěj Kubečka

27 October 2026 Round of 16	Slavia Prague	4–0	Zbrojovka Brno	Prague
19:00 CEST (UTC+2)	Suleiman 28', 85'; Nowak 45+3' (pen.); Jurásek 63'	Report	Granečný (yellow card) 20'; Vedral (yellow card) 70'	Stadium: Fortuna Arena; Attendance: 12,468; Referee: Adam Trska

== Squad statistics ==
=== Appearances and goals ===
No.	Pos	Nat	Player	Total		Chance Liga		MOL Cup	
No.	Pos	Nat	Player	Apps	Goals	Apps	Goals	Apps	Goals
Goalkeepers
1	GK	(Slovakia) SVK	Adam Hrdina	12	0	12	0	0	0
24	GK	(Czech Republic) CZE	Dominik Sváček	0	0	0	0	0	0
30	GK	(Czech Republic) CZE	Colin Andrew	0	0	0	0	0	0
71	GK	(Czech Republic) CZE	Ondřej Prodělal	3	0	0	0	3	0
Defenders
3	DF	(Brazil) BRA	Kaká	12	0	10	0	1+1	0
4	DF	(Czech Republic) CZE	Eric Hunal	7	0	1+3	0	3	0
17	DF	(Czech Republic) CZE	Jaromír Zmrhal	14	0	3+8	0	3	0
18	DF	(Czech Republic) CZE	Denis Granečný	5	2	0+2	0	1+2	2
25	DF	(Czech Republic) CZE	Tomáš Břečka	3	0	0+1	0	1+1	0
26	DF	(Czech Republic) CZE	Filip Vedral	12	1	10+1	1	1	0
32	DF	(Czech Republic) CZE	Jan Juroška	0	0	0	0	0	0
38	DF	(Czech Republic) CZE	Jakub Pokorný	5	0	4	0	1	0
39	DF	(Czech Republic) CZE	Jakub Klíma	13	0	12	0	0+1	0
44	DF	(Mali) MLI	Amadou Dante	13	1	11+1	1	0+1	0
Midfielders
6	MF	(Czech Republic) CZE	Lukáš Penxa	14	2	9+2	2	2+1	0
7	MF	(Czech Republic) CZE	Štěpán Langer	11	1	5+4	0	1+1	1
8	MF	(Czech Republic) CZE	Patrik Čavoš	12	0	8+2	0	1+1	0
11	MF	(Slovakia) SVK	Martin Rymarenko	8	0	2+4	0	1+1	0
14	MF	(Czech Republic) CZE	Tadeáš Vachoušek	13	3	9+2	2	1+1	1
20	MF	(Czech Republic) CZE	Lukas Saal	9	0	3+4	0	2	0
23	MF	(Czech Republic) CZE	Petr Ševčík	7	0	2+3	0	2	0
29	MF	(Czech Republic) CZE	Patrik Žitný	2	0	1	0	0+1	0
68	MF	(Czech Republic) CZE	Jakub Janetzký	11	0	6+4	0	0+1	0
Forwards
9	FW	(Czech Republic) CZE	Oliver Velich	8	2	0+6	0	1+1	2
10	FW	(Czech Republic) CZE	Antonín Vaníček	13	3	7+5	3	1	0
15	FW	(Czech Republic) CZE	Daniel Vašulín	13	5	12	5	0+1	0
19	FW	(Burundi) BDI	Bienvenue Kanakimana	8	3	1+4	0	3	3
21	FW	(Czech Republic) CZE	Filip Večeřa	0	0	0	0	0	0
77	FW	(Nigeria) NGR	Lucky Ezeh	10	2	4+4	1	2	1
Players transferred/loaned out during the season
	DF	(Serbia) SRB	Alex Marković	0	0	0	0	0	0
	MF	(North Macedonia) MKD	Martin Gjorgievski	1	2	0	0	0+1	2

Last updated: 30 October 2026
Source: Competitions

=== Goal Scorers ===
Place	Pos.	Name	Chance Liga	MOL Cup	Total
1	FW	(Czech Republic) Daniel Vašulín	5	0	5
2	FW	(Czech Republic) Antonín Vaníček	3	0	3
2	FW	(Burundi) Bienvenue Kanakimana	0	3	3
2	MF	(Czech Republic) Tadeáš Vachoušek	2	1	3
5	MF	(Czech Republic) Lukáš Penxa	2	0	2
5	FW	(Czech Republic) Oliver Velich	0	2	2
5	DF	(Czech Republic) Denis Granečný	0	2	2
5	MF	(North Macedonia) Martin Gjorgievski	0	2	2
5	FW	(Nigeria) Lucky Ezeh	1	1	2
10	DF	(Mali) Amadou Dante	1	0	1
10	MF	(Czech Republic) Štěpán Langer	0	1	1
10	DF	(Czech Republic) Filip Vedral	1	0	1
Own goals			1	1	2
TOTAL			16	13	30

Last updated: 30 October 2026
Source: Competitions

=== Assists ===
Place	Pos.	Name	Chance Liga	MOL Cup	Total
1	FW	(Czech Republic) Tadeáš Vachoušek	2	0	2
2	DF	(Czech Republic) Filip Vedral	1	0	1
2	DF	(Mali) Amadou Dante	1	0	1
Own goals			0	0	0
TOTAL			4	0	4

Last updated: 12 August 2026
Source: Competitions

=== Clean sheets ===
Place	Pos.	Name	Chance Liga	MOL Cup	Total
1	GK	(Slovakia) Adam Hrdina	0	0	0
TOTAL			0	0	0

Last updated: 12 August 2026
Source: Competitions

=== Disciplinary record ===
Position	Name	Chance Liga		MOL Cup		Total	
Position	Name	Yellow card	Red card	Yellow card	Red card	Yellow card	Red card
DF	(Mali) Amadou Dante	2	0	0	0	2	0
DF	(Czech Republic) Filip Vedral	1	0	0	0	1	0
MF	(Czech Republic) Lukas Saal	1	0	0	0	1	0
MF	(Czech Republic) Patrik Čavoš	1	0	0	0	1	0
MF	(Czech Republic) Antonín Vaníček	1	0	0	0	1	0
Players away on loan:
Players who left Zbrojovka during the season:
	TOTALS	6	0	0	0	6	0

Last updated: 12 August 2026
Source: Competitions
