= 2025–26 FC Zbrojovka Brno season =

FC Zbrojovka Brno
2025–26 season
- General manager: Jan Mynář
- Manager: Martin Svědík
- Stadium: ShipEX Arena
- Czech National Football League: 1st
- Czech Cup: Fourth round
- Top goalscorer: League: Tadeáš Vachoušek (7); All: Oliver Velich (8)
- Highest home attendance: 8,800, 16 March 2026 v Artis Brno (league)
- Lowest home attendance: 3,414, 27 September 2025 v Slavia Prague "B" (league)
- Average home league attendance: 4,816
- Biggest win: 7–2, 30 July 2025 v Příbram (league)
- Biggest defeat: 0–4, 11 April 2026 v Opava
Home colours	Away colours

The 2025–26 FC Zbrojovka Brno season is the club's 7th season in the Czech National Football League. The team is competing in 2025–26 Czech National Football League and the 2025–26 Czech Cup.

== First team squad ==
As of 19 July 2025.

Note: Flags indicate national team as defined under FIFA eligibility rules; some limited exceptions apply. Players may hold more than one non-FIFA nationality.

No.	Pos.	Nation	Player
1	GK	SVK	Adam Hrdina
3	DF	BRA	Kauan Carneiro Kaká
6	MF	CZE	Daniel Polák
7	FW	CZE	Filip Večeřa
8	MF	CZE	Patrik Čavoš
9	FW	CZE	Oliver Velich
10	FW	CZE	Jakub Selnar
11	MF	SVK	Martin Rymarenko
13	MF	CZE	Jiří Texl
14	MF	CZE	Tadeáš Vachoušek (on loan from Teplice)
16	FW	CZE	Adam Kronus
17	DF	CZE	Daniel Kutík
18	DF	CZE	Denis Granečný
19	FW	BDI	Bienvenue Kanakimana
20	MF	CZE	Lukas Saal
21	MF	CZE	Ondřej Pachlopník

No.	Pos.	Nation	Player
22	DF	CZE	Patrik Haitl
23	DF	CZE	Jakub Šural
24	GK	CZE	Dominik Sváček
25	DF	CZE	Tomáš Břečka
26	DF	CZE	Filip Vedral
27	MF	CZE	Filip Blecha
29	MF	CZE	Patrik Žitný
32	DF	CZE	Jan Juroška
39	DF	CZE	Jakub Klíma
44	DF	CZE	Filip Štěpánek
66	DF	CZE	Stanislav Hofmann
68	MF	CZE	Jakub Janetzký
78	GK	CZE	Ondřej Prodělal
99	FW	TRI	Justin Araujo-Wilson
—	MF	CZE	Jan Hellebrand

=== Out on loan ===
Note: Flags indicate national team as defined under FIFA eligibility rules; some limited exceptions apply. Players may hold more than one non-FIFA nationality.

No. / Pos. / Nation / Player; — / DF / CZE / Zdeněk Toman (at Kroměříž)	No. / Pos. / Nation / Player; — / FW / COL / William Mackleyther (at Kroměříž)

== Transfers ==
=== In ===
Pos	Player	Transferred from	Fee	Window	Date	Source
DF	(Czech Republic) Jan Juroška	FC Baník Ostrava	Free transfer	Summer	28 May 2025	
MF	(Czech Republic) Patrik Čavoš	MFK Karviná	Free transfer	Summer	12 June 2025	
MF	(Czech Republic) Filip Blecha	Slezský FC Opava	Free transfer	Summer	3 June 2025	
DF	(Czech Republic) Filip Vedral	MFK Vyškov	Undisclosed	Summer	18 June 2025	
DF	(Czech Republic) Jakub Klíma	FC Hradec Králové	Free transfer	Summer	5 June 2025	
FW	(Slovakia) Martin Rymarenko	MFK Dukla Banská Bystrica	€230,000	Summer	4 June 2025	

== Friendly matches ==
=== Pre-season ===
June 21, 2025 Friendly	Zlín	2–2	Zbrojovka Brno	Spytihněv
10:30 CEST (UTC+2)	Natchkebia 40' Lopes 59'	Report	Kronus 14' Břečka 46'	Stadium: hřiště Spytihněv; Attendance: 510; Referee: Volek

June 28, 2025 Friendly	Wieczysta Krakow	1–2	Zbrojovka Brno	Kraków
16:00 CEST (UTC+2)	Vukojević 33'	Report	Kronus 16' Blecha 90+3' (pen.)	Stadium: TC Cracovia

July 2, 2025 Friendly	Zbrojovka Brno	1–0	Michalovce	Kraków
17:00 CEST (UTC+2)	Kanakimana 2'	Report		Stadium: TC Cracovia

July 5, 2025 Friendly	Tychy	2–8	Zbrojovka Brno	Tychy
11:00 CEST (UTC+2)	Gebala 103' Sanyang 120'	Report	Velich 4', 32', 38' Rymarenko 35' Kaká 85' Hofmann 98' Saal 108' Vachoušek 133'	Stadium: Stadion Miejski

Friendly July 11, 2025	Zbrojovka Brno	3–0	Bytom	Pohořelice
11:00 CEST (UTC+2)	Krzyżak 90' (o.g.) Žitný 109' Kubr 110'	Report		Stadium: Stadion TJ Sokol Pohořelice

== Competitions ==
Win Draw Loss

=== Overview ===
Competition	First match	Last match	Starting round	Record							
Competition	First match	Last match	Starting round	Pld	W	D	L	GF	GA	GD	Win %
Fortuna národní liga	18 July 2025	23 May 2026	Matchday 1	24	20	2	2	51	19	+32	83.33
MOL Cup	12 August 2025	12 November 2025	First round	4	3	0	1	7	4	+3	75.00
Total				28	23	2	3	58	23	+35	82.14

Last updated: 23 April 2026
Source: Competitions

=== Fortuna národní liga ===
==== Results summary ====
Overall								Home						Away					
Pld	W	D	L	GF	GA	GD	Pts	W	D	L	GF	GA	GD	W	D	L	GF	GA	GD
24	20	2	2	51	19	+32	62	10	1	1	25	8	+17	10	1	1	26	11	+15

Last updated: 23 April 2026.

==== Results by round ====
Round	1	2	3	4	5	6	7	8	9	10	11	12	13	14	15	16	17	18	19	20	21	22	23	24	25	26	27	28	29	30
Ground	A	H	A	H	A	H	A	H	A	H	H	A	H	A	H	A	H	A	H	A	H	A	H	A	A	H	A	H	A	H
Result	W	W	W	W	D	L	W	W	W	W	W	W	D	W	W	W	W	W	W	W	W	L	W	W						
Position	1	1	1	1	1	1	1	1	1	1	1	1	1	1	1	1	1	1	1	1	1	1	1	1	1	1	1	1	1	1

Updated to match(es) played on 23 April 2026. Source:
A = Away; H = Home; W = Win; D = Draw; L = Loss

==== League table ====
Pos	Team	Pld	W	D	L	GF	GA	GD	Pts	Promotion or relegation
1	Zbrojovka Brno (C, P)	30	24	4	2	62	22	+40	76	Promotion to 2026–27 Czech First League
2	Táborsko (Q)	30	16	5	9	48	32	+16	53	Qualification for promotion play-offs
3	Artis Brno (Q)	30	15	7	8	50	37	+13	52	Qualification for promotion play-offs
4	Ústí nad Labem	30	15	3	12	53	46	+7	48	
5	Baník Ostrava B	30	14	5	11	45	38	+7	47	

Source: Chance Národní Liga
Rules for classification: 1) Points; 2) Head-to-head points; 3) Head-to-head goal difference; 4) Head-to-head goals scored; 5) Goal difference; 6) Goals scored; 7) Play-off (if deciding promotion or relegation); 8) Draw
(C) Champions; (P) Promoted; (Q) Qualified for the phase indicated

==== Results ====
18 July 2025 1	České Budějovice	0–2	Zbrojovka Brno	České Budějovice
18:00 CEST (UTC+2)	Vaníček (yellow card) 39'	Report	Juroška (yellow card) 19'; Hofmann 23'; Janetzký (yellow card) 24'; Hofmann (yellow card) 71'; Kronus 81'	Stadium: Stadion Střelecký ostrov Attendance: 3,152; Referee: Jan Petřík

25 July 2025 2	Zbrojovka Brno	3-0	Sparta Prague "B"	Brno
18:00 CEST (UTC+2)	Velich 31'; Čavoš (yellow card) 47'; Vedral (yellow card) 52'; Klíma 64'; Juroška 84'; Juroška (yellow card) 90+2'	Report	Mensah (yellow card) 26'; Hollý (yellow card) 44'; Tošnar (yellow card) 60'; Horák (yellow card) 90+2'	Stadium: ShipEx Aréna; Attendance: 5,647; Referee: Pavel Orel

30 July 2025 3	1. FK Příbram	2–7	Zbrojovka Brno	Příbram
18:00 CEST (UTC+2)	Antwi (yellow card) 23'; Švestka (yellow card) 31'; Hašek 68'; Vokřínek 89'	Report	Velich 16'; Klíma 24'; Rymarenko 61'; Čavoš 72'; Vachoušek 78'; Kanakimana 90+1'; Juroška 90+3'	Stadium: Na Litavce; Attendance: 1,580; Referee: Všetečka

2 August 2025 4	Zbrojovka Brno	2–1	Táborsko	Brno
18:00 CEST (UTC+2)	Žitný 1'; Hofmann 90+6'; Svědík (yellow card) 40' (coach); Čavoš (yellow card) 60'	Report	Kateřiňák 30'; Bláha (yellow card) 20'; Hák (yellow card) 28'	Stadium: ShipEx Aréna; Attendance: 4 638; Referee: Adam Trska

8 August 2025 5	Artis Brno	2–2	Zbrojovka Brno	Brno
18:00 CEST (UTC+2)	Adediran 8'; Byesyedin (yellow card) 23'; Adediran (yellow card) 37'; Pospíšil 62'	Report	Rymarenko 23'; Hofmann 26'; Klíma (yellow card) 34'; Vedral (yellow card) 52'; Hofmann (yellow card) 87'	Stadium: ShipEx Aréna; Attendance: 8,200; Referee: Marek Radina

16 August 2025 6	Zbrojovka Brno	1–2	Prostějov	Brno
18:00 CEST (UTC+2)	Klíma (yellow card) 68' (yellow-red card) 70'; Saňák (yellow card) 70' (assistant coach); Velich (yellow card) 72'; Kauan Carneiro (yellow card) 84'; Kutík 89'	Report	Mirvald (yellow card) 9'; Koudelka 27'; Hais (yellow card) 28'; Jozef Weber (yellow card) 57' (coach); Matoušek (yellow card) 61'; Šindelář (yellow card) 67'; Mikulec (yellow card) 90+4'	Stadium: ShipEx Aréna; Attendance: 3,789; Referee: Vojtěch Opočenský

22 August 2025 7	MFK Chrudim	0–1	Zbrojovka Brno	Pardubice
18:00 CEST (UTC+2)	Michal Skwarczek (yellow card) 15'; Lumír Číž (yellow card) 59'; Adam Čičovský (yellow card) 90'; Adam Richter (yellow card) 90+6'	Report	Kanakimana 50'	Stadium: CFIG Arena; Attendance: 1,115; Referee: (Czech Republic) Jan Petřík

14 September 2025 9	FK Viktoria Žižkov	1–4	Zbrojovka Brno	Prague
10:15 CEST (UTC+2)	Marek Richter 85'	Report	Selnar 12'; Velich 19'; Vachoušek 40'; Kanakimana 79'	Stadium: Stadion Viktorie Žižkov; Attendance: 2,608; Referee: (Czech Republic) Ladislav Szikszay

20 September 2025 10	Zbrojovka Brno	2–1	FC Vysočina Jihlava	Brno
17:00 CEST (UTC+2)	Velich 52' 79'	Report	Fabiš (yellow card) 59'; Tomáš Franěk (yellow card) 68'; Jan Haala (yellow card) 81'; Omotoye 90+1'; Matyáš Miška (yellow card) 90+2'	Stadium: ShipEx Aréna; Attendance: 4,108; Referee: (Czech Republic) Filip Kotala

27 September 2025 11	Zbrojovka Brno	v	Slavia Prague "B"	Brno
17:00 CEST (UTC+2)				Stadium: ShipEx Aréna

3 October 2025 12	Ústí nad Labem	v	Zbrojovka Brno	Ústí nad Labem
18:00 CEST (UTC+2)				Stadium: Městský stadion

18 October 2025 13	Zbrojovka Brno	v	Baník Ostrava "B"	Brno
15:30 CEST (UTC+2)				Stadium: ShipEx Aréna

30 August 2025 8	Zbrojovka Brno	-	Slezský FC Opava	Brno
18:00 CEST (UTC+2)				Stadium: ShipEx Aréna

26 October 2025 14	FC Sellier & Bellot Vlašim	v	Zbrojovka Brno	Vlašim
14:30 CEST (UTC+2)				Stadium: Stadion Kollárova ulice

1 November 2025 15	Zbrojovka Brno	v	Kroměříž	Brno
15:00 CEST (UTC+2)				Stadium: ShipEx Aréna

9 November 2025 16	Sparta Prague "B"	v	Zbrojovka Brno	Prague
10:30 CEST (UTC+2)				Stadium: Stadion AC Sparta Prague B

15 February 2026 17	Zbrojovka Brno	v	Příbram	Brno
18:00 CEST (UTC+2)				Stadium: ShipEx Aréna

22 February 2026 18	Táborsko	v	Zbrojovka Brno	Tábor
18:00 CEST (UTC+2)

1 March 2026 19	Zbrojovka Brno	v	SK Artis Brno	Brno
18:00 CEST (UTC+2)				Stadium: ShipEx Aréna

8 March 2026 20	Prostějov	v	Zbrojovka Brno	Prostějov
18:00 CEST (UTC+2)				Stadium: Stadion Za Místním nádražím

15 March 2026 21	Zbrojovka Brno	v	MFK Chrudim	Brno
18:00 CEST (UTC+2)				Stadium: ShipEx Aréna

22 March 2026 22	Opava	v	Zbrojovka Brno	Opava
18:00 CEST (UTC+2)				Stadium: Městský stadion Opava

29 March 2026 23	Zbrojovka Brno	v	FK Viktoria Žižkov	Brno
17:00 CEST (UTC+2)				Stadium: ShipEx Aréna

5 April 2026 24	FC Vysočina Jihlava	v	Zbrojovka Brno	Jihlava
17:00 CEST (UTC+2)

12 April 2026 25	Slavia Prague "B"	v	Zbrojovka Brno	Radotín
17:00 CEST (UTC+2)				Stadium: Stadion Radotín

19 April 2026 26	Zbrojovka Brno	v	Ústí nad Labem	Brno
18:00 CEST (UTC+2)				Stadium: ShipEx Aréna

26 April 2026 27	Baník Ostrava "B"	v	Zbrojovka Brno	Ostrava
15:30 CEST (UTC+2)				Stadium: Městský stadion

3 May 2026 28	Zbrojovka Brno	v	Vlašim	Brno
15:00 CEST (UTC+2)				Stadium: ShipEx Aréna

10 May 2026 29	Kroměříž	v	Zbrojovka Brno	Kroměříž
10:30 CEST (UTC+2)				Stadium: Stadion Jožky Silného

17 May 2026 30	Zbrojovka Brno	v	České Budějovice	Brno
15:00 CEST (UTC+2)				Stadium: ShipEx Aréna

=== Czech Cup ===
==== Results ====
12 August 2025 First round	Havlíčkův Brod (4)	0–1	Zbrojovka Brno	Havlíčkův Brod
17:30 CEST (UTC+2)		Report	Klíma 13'	Stadium: Stadion Na Losích; Attendance: 1,495; Referee: Filip Kotala

27 August 2025 Second round	Bohunice (4)	v	Zbrojovka Brno	Brno-Bohunice
17:30 CEST (UTC+2)				Stadium: Stadion Tatran Bohunice

== Squad statistics ==
=== Appearances and goals ===
No.	Pos	Nat	Player	Total		Fortuna národní liga		MOL Cup	
No.	Pos	Nat	Player	Apps	Goals	Apps	Goals	Apps	Goals
Goalkeepers
1	GK	(Slovakia) SVK	Adam Hrdina	1	0	1	0	0	0
24	GK	(Czech Republic) CZE	Dominik Sváček	0	0	0	0	0	0
78	GK	(Czech Republic) CZE	Adam Prodělal	0	0	0	0	0	0
Defenders
3	DF	(Brazil) BRA	Kauan Carneiro Kaká	0	0	0	0	0	0
17	DF	(Czech Republic) CZE	Daniel Kutík	0	0	0	0	0	0
18	DF	(Czech Republic) CZE	Denis Granečný	1	0	1	0	0	0
22	DF	(Czech Republic) CZE	Patrik Haitl	0	0	0	0	0	0
23	DF	(Czech Republic) CZE	Jakub Šural	0	0	0	0	0	0
25	DF	(Czech Republic) CZE	Tomáš Břečka	0	0	0	0	0	0
26	DF	(Czech Republic) CZE	Filip Vedral	1	0	1	0	0	0
32	DF	(Czech Republic) CZE	Jan Juroška	1	0	1	0	0	0
39	DF	(Czech Republic) CZE	Jakub Klíma	1	0	1	0	0	0
44	DF	(Czech Republic) CZE	Filip Štěpánek	0	0	0	0	0	0
66	DF	(Czech Republic) CZE	Stanislav Hofmann	1	1	1	1	0	0
Midfielders
6	MF	(Czech Republic) CZE	Daniel Polák	0	0	0	0	0	0
8	MF	(Czech Republic) CZE	Patrik Čavoš	1	0	1	0	0	0
11	MF	(Slovakia) SVK	Martin Rymarenko	0	0	0	0	0	0
13	MF	(Czech Republic) CZE	Jiří Texl	0	0	0	0	0	0
14	MF	(Czech Republic) CZE	Tadeáš Vachoušek	1	0	0+1	0	0	0
20	MF	(Czech Republic) CZE	Lukas Saal	0	0	0	0	0	0
21	MF	(Czech Republic) CZE	Ondřej Pachlopník	0	0	0	0	0	0
27	MF	(Czech Republic) CZE	Filip Blecha	1	0	0+1	0	0	0
29	MF	(Czech Republic) CZE	Patrik Žitný	1	0	0+1	0	0	0
68	MF	(Czech Republic) CZE	Jakub Janetzký	1	0	1	0	0	0
Forwards
7	FW	(Czech Republic) CZE	Filip Večeřa	0	0	0	0	0	0
9	FW	(Czech Republic) CZE	Oliver Velich	1	0	1	0	0	0
10	MF	(Czech Republic) CZE	Jakub Selnar	1	0	1	0	0	0
16	MF	(Czech Republic) CZE	Adam Kronus	1	1	1	1	0	0
19	MF	(Burundi) BDI	Bienvenue Kanakimana	1	0	1	0	0	0
99	MF	(Trinidad and Tobago) TRI	Justin Araujo-Wilson	1	0	0+1	0	0	0
Players transferred/loaned out during the season

Last updated: 23 July 2025
Source: Competitions

=== Goal Scorers ===
Place	Pos.	Name	Fortuna národní liga	MOL Cup	Total
1	FW	(Czech Republic) Adam Kronus	1	0	1
1	DF	(Czech Republic) Stanislav Hofmann	1	0	1
Own goals			0	0	0
TOTAL			2	0	2

Last updated: 23 July 2025
Source: Competitions

=== Assists ===
Place	Pos.	Name	Fortuna národní liga	MOL Cup	Total
1	MF	(Czech Republic) Jakub Selnar	2	0	2
TOTAL			2	0	2

Last updated: 23 July 2025
Source: Competitions

=== Clean sheets ===
Place	Pos.	Name	Fortuna národní liga	MOL Cup	Total
1	GK	(Slovakia) Adam Hrdina	1	0	1
TOTAL			1	0	1

Last updated: 23 July 2025
Source: Competitions

=== Disciplinary record ===
Position	Name	Fortuna národní liga		MOL Cup		Total	
Position	Name	Booked	Sent off (straight red)	Booked	Sent off (straight red)	Booked	Sent off (straight red)
DF	(Czech Republic) Jan Juroška	1	0	0	0	1	0
MF	(Czech Republic) Jakub Janetzký	1	0	0	0	1	0
DF	(Czech Republic) Stanislav Hofmann	1	0	0	0	1	0
Players away on loan:
Players who left Zbrojovka during the season:
	TOTALS	3	0	0	0	3	0

Last updated: 23 July 2025
Source: Competitions
