= Kaká (footballer, born 2004) =

Brazilian footballer

Personal information
- Full name: Kauan Carneiro Da Silva
- Date of birth: October 16, 2004 (age 22)
- Place of birth: Feira de Santana, Brazil
- Height: 1.96 m (6 ft 5 in)
- Position: Centre back

Team information
- Current team: Zbrojovka Brno
- Number: 3

Youth career
- –2022: Aliança
- 2022–2023: Vila Nova
- 2023: Capivariano
- 2023: Karviná

Senior career*
Years	Team	Apps	(Gls)
2023–2025	Karviná B	26	(2)
2024–2025	→ Prostějov (loan)	27	(3)
2025–	Zbrojovka Brno	33	(3)
- * Club domestic league appearances and goals as of 16 September 2026

Kauan Carneiro Da Silva (born 16 October 2004), commonly known as Kaká, is a Brazilian footballer who plays for Czech club Zbrojovka Brno in the second-tier Czech National Football League.

== Club career ==
=== Early career ===
He was born in the city of Feira de Santana and started playing football for Alianza, Vila Nova and Caprivariano. He was on trial at FG Football School, but after a few months he decided to leave for Europe.

=== Karviná ===
At the age of 19, he transferred to the Czech team MFK Karviná. He started in the reserve team playing in the third-tier Moravian-Silesian Football League. He spent the following season on loan in Prostějov, where he played regularly in the second-tier Czech National Football League.

=== Zbrojovka Brno ===
In June 2025, he signed for Zbrojovka Brno of the Czech second tier. He made his debut in the third round at Příbram, where he replaced Patrik Čavoš in the 81st minute. He scored his first goal in the 11th round against Slavia B, when he took advantage of a pass from Patrik Žitný, and helped his team to 2-1 win. On 26 October 2025, he helped the team win in Vlašim with the only goal. He scored with his head after a cross from Jan Juroška.

== Style of play ==
Martin Svědík praised Kaká for his productive left-footed play, speed, technique and ability in heading duels in the penalty areas. His playing is reminiscent of his compatriot Gabriel Magalhães.
