= 2026–27 Czech National Football League =

Czech National Football League
- Season: 2026–27
- Dates: 25 July 2026 – 29 May 2027
- Matches: 112
- Goals: 336 (3 per match)
- Top goalscorer: Adam Kronus (8 goals)
- Biggest home win: Vlašim 4–1 Žižkov; 7 August 2026; Táborsko 3–0 Opava; 15 August 2026
- Biggest away win: Kroměříž 0–4 Jihlava; 15 August 2026
- Highest scoring: Česká Lípa 2–5 Karviná; 15 August 2026
- All statistics correct as of 16 November 2026.

The 2026–27 Czech National Football League (known as the Chance Národní Liga for sponsorship reasons) is the 34th season of the Czech Republic's second tier football league. The season will start on 25 July 2026.

== Format ==
The season format is unchanged from last season. Each team will play in the league format home and away matches. The top-ranked team will be promoted to the Czech First League, the two teams positioned 2nd and 3rd will play off with the two teams from the first league positioned 14th and 15th in a home and away format. The two lowest-ranked teams will be relegated directly to the third tier.

== Team changes ==
Team changes for sporting reasons included Dukla Prague joining the league after being relegated from the previous season's First League, while last season's champions Zbrojovka Brno changed places with them.

Sparta Prague B was relegated as the 16th-placed team of the 2025–26 season. After the 2025–26 season, the clubs Dynamo České Budějovice and MFK Chrudim were administratively relegated to the Bohemian Football League, after they failed to meet the conditions for obtaining a license for professional competition. Instead, Vysočina Jihlava (15th team of the 2025–26 season) was spared from relegation and the winners of both Bohemian Football League (third tier) groups, Kladno and Arsenal Česká Lípa, were promoted (instead of playing a play-off to determine only one promoted team). The last new team in the competition is Třinec that won the Moravian-Silesian Football League (third tier).

On 15 June 2026, MFK Karviná was administratively relegated to the Czech National Football League by the Ethics Committee of the Football Association of the Czech Republic due to alleged match-fixing. The club appealed the decision and the fixtures of the 2026–27 season were drawn with Karviná as a member of the Czech First League. On 28 June 2026, the club decided to withdraw its appeal and leave the league. Because the 2025–26 season was officially concluded on 22 June, the Karviná's place in the league was preferentially offered to the Czech National Football League's last season best teams. After FC Silon Táborsko rejected the offer, Karviná was replaced by SK Artis Brno.

=== From CNFL ===
- FC Zbrojovka Brno (promoted to 2026–27 Czech First League)
- SK Artis Brno (administratively moved to 2026–27 Czech First League)
- SK Dynamo České Budějovice (administratively relegated to Bohemian Football League)
- MFK Chrudim (administratively relegated to Bohemian Football League)
- AC Sparta Prague B (relegated to Bohemian Football League)

=== To CNFL ===
- FK Dukla Prague (relegated from 2025–26 Czech First League)
- MFK Karviná (administratively moved from 2026–27 Czech First League)
- SK Kladno (promoted from 2025–26 Bohemian Football League group A)
- FK Arsenal Česká Lípa (promoted from 2025–26 Bohemian Football League group B)
- FK Třinec (promoted from 2025–26 Moravian-Silesian Football League)

== Team overview ==
Location of clubs in the 2026–27 league

=== Locations and stadiums ===
Club	Location	Stadium	Capacity	2025–26 position
MFK Karviná	Karviná	Městský stadion (Karviná)	4,833	8th in First League
FK Dukla Prague	Prague	Stadion Juliska	8,150	16th in First League
FC Silon Táborsko	Tábor	Stadion v Kvapilově ulici	1,500	2nd
FK Viagem Ústí nad Labem	Ústí nad Labem	Městský stadion	4,000	4th
FC Baník Ostrava B	Ostrava	Městský stadion (Ostrava)	15,123	5th
FK Příbram	Příbram	Na Litavce	9,100	6th
SFC Opava	Opava	Stadion v Městských sadech	7,524	7th
FK Viktoria Žižkov	Prague	FK Viktoria Stadion	2,799	8th
FC Sellier & Bellot Vlašim	Vlašim	Stadion Kollárova ulice	3,000	9th
SK Slavia Prague B	Prague	FK Viktoria Stadion	2,799	10th
SK Hanácká Slavia Kroměříž	Kroměříž	Stadion Jožky Silného	1,529	12th
1. SK Prostějov	Prostějov	Stadion Za Místním nádražím	3,500	14th
FC Vysočina Jihlava	Jihlava	Stadion v Jiráskově ulici	4,500	15th
SK Kladno	Kladno	Stadion Františka Kloze	3,804	1st in ČFL A
FK Arsenal Česká Lípa	Česká Lípa	Městský stadion u Ploučnice	5,000	1st in ČFL B
FK Třinec	Třinec	Stadion Rudolfa Labaje	2,200	1st in MSFL

== League table ==
Pos	Team	Pld	W	D	L	GF	GA	GD	Pts	Promotion or relegation
1	Karviná	15	10	1	4	32	19	+13	31	Promotion to 2026–27 Czech First League
2	Dukla Prague	15	9	3	3	26	20	+6	30	Qualification for promotion play-offs
3	Vysočina Jihlava	14	8	2	4	25	16	+9	26	Qualification for promotion play-offs
4	Příbram	15	6	6	3	26	21	+5	24	
5	Vlašim	14	6	3	5	23	17	+6	21	
6	Ústí nad Labem	15	5	5	5	20	20	0	20	
7	Arsenal Česká Lípa	15	5	5	5	22	25	−3	20	
8	Táborsko	15	4	7	4	20	21	−1	19	
9	Baník Ostrava B	15	5	3	7	25	23	+2	18	Ineligible for promotion
10	Opava	14	4	6	4	19	21	−2	18	
11	Slavia Prague B	15	4	5	6	29	28	+1	17	Ineligible for promotion
12	Kladno	14	4	5	5	21	22	−1	17	
13	Viktoria Žižkov	14	4	3	7	13	22	−9	15	
14	Prostějov	14	2	8	4	18	22	−4	14	
15	Třinec	15	3	5	7	17	26	−9	14	Relegation to 2026–27 ČFL or MSFL
16	Hanácká Slavia Kroměříž	15	3	3	9	15	28	−13	12	Relegation to 2026–27 ČFL or MSFL

Updated to match(es) played on 21 November 2026. Source: Chance národní liga
Rules for classification: 1) Points; 2) Head-to-head points; 3) Head-to-head goal difference; 4) Head-to-head goals scored; 5) Goal difference; 6) Goals scored; 7) Play-off (if deciding promotion or relegation); 8) Draw

== Top scorers ==
As of 21 November 2026

Rank	Player	Club	Goals
1	(Czech Republic) Adam Kronus	Karviná	8
2	(Czech Republic) David Jurčenko	Kladno	7
3	(Slovakia) Peter Juritka	Opava	6
3	(Belgium) Tyrese Omotoye	Jihlava	6
5	(Slovakia) Rajmund Mikuš	Dukla	5
5	(Czech Republic) Jaroslav Málek	Příbram	5
5	(Czech Republic) Jakub Selnar	Karviná	5
5	(Czech Republic) Lukáš Fila	Příbram	5
9	20 players		4

== See also ==
- 2026–27 Czech First League
- 2026–27 Czech Cup
