= Večeřa =

Večeřa (feminine: Večeřová) is a Czech surname. Notable people with the surname include:

- Ivana Večeřová (born 1979), Czech basketball player
- Karel Večeřa (born 1955), Czech football manager

== Meaning ==
Czech (Večeřa) and Slovak (Večera): derived from Czech "večeře" and Slovak "večera," meaning 'evening meal,' likely used as a nickname. The Italian origin remains unexplained.
