= Vedral =

Vedral (feminine: Vedralová) is a Czech surname, meaning '[he] forced his way'. Notable people with the surname include:

- Filip Vedral (born 1997), Czech footballer
- Vlatko Vedral (born 1971), Serbian-British physicist
