= Luboš Přibyl =

Czech footballer

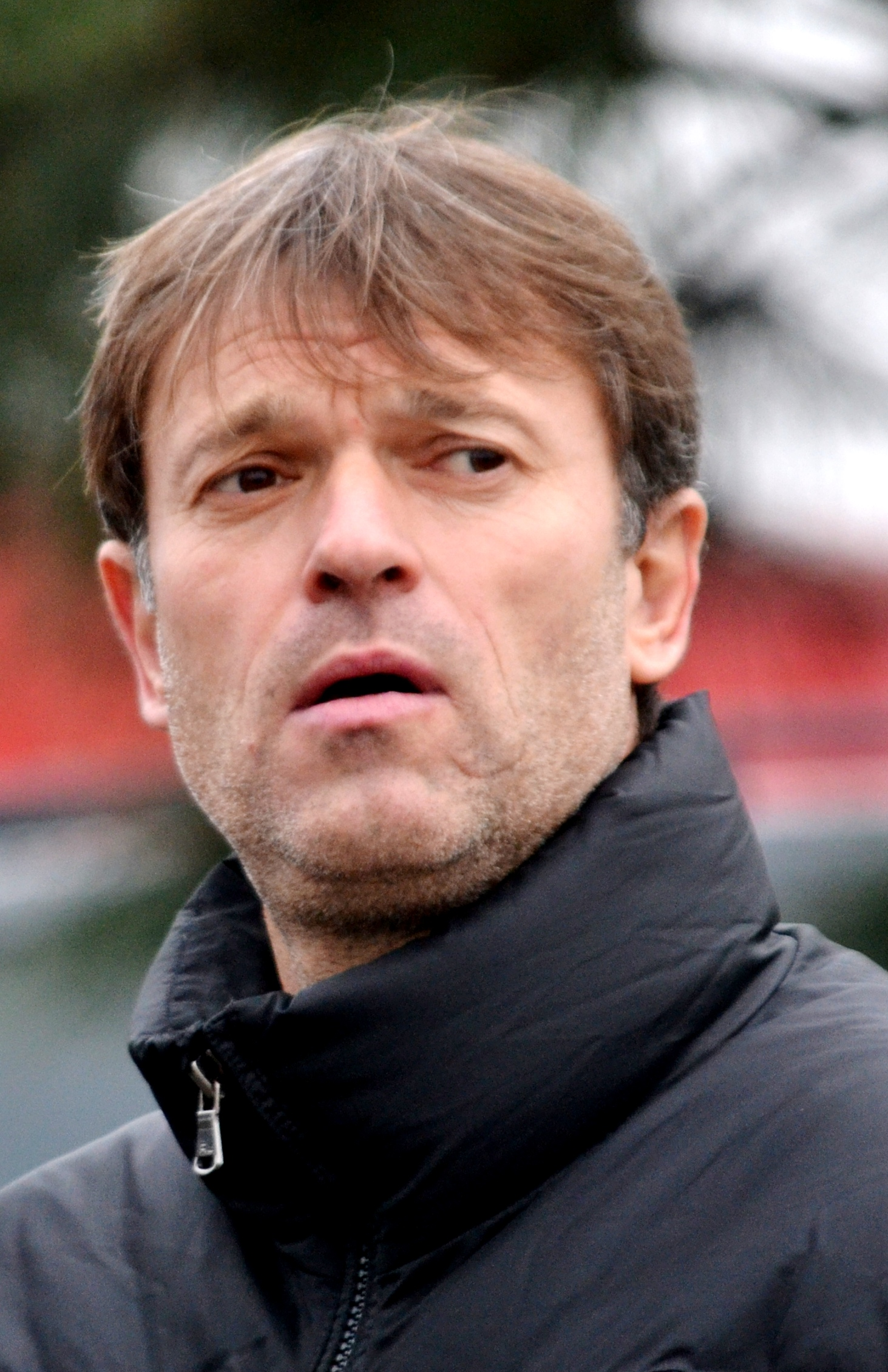

Personal information
- Date of birth: 16 October 1964 (age 62)
- Place of birth: Pardubice, Czechoslovakia
- Height: 1.85 m (6 ft 1 in)
- Position: Goalkeeper

Senior career*
Years	Team	Apps	(Gls)
1983–1984	SK Slavia Prague	14	(0)
1987–1988	RH Cheb	4	(0)
1988–1990	SK Slavia Prague	22	(0)
1991–1994	SK Sigma Olomouc	84	(0)
1994–2003	FC Boby Brno	224	(0)
Total		348	(0)

International career
1983	Czechoslovakia U21	4	(0)
1992	Czechoslovakia B	1	(0)
- * Club domestic league appearances and goals

Luboš Přibyl (born 16 October 1964) is a Czech former football goalkeeper. He played in the Czechoslovak First League and later the Gambrinus liga, making 348 top-flight appearances in total.
