= Marek Zúbek =

Czech footballer

Personal information
- Full name: Marek Zúbek
- Date of birth: 5 August 1975 (age 51)
- Place of birth: Žilina, Czechoslovakia
- Height: 1.81 m (5 ft 11 in)
- Position: Midfielder

Senior career*
Years	Team	Apps	(Gls)
1993–2004	FC Brno	260	(8)
2002	→ Lommel (loan)	5	(0)
2005	Baník Ostrava	12	(1)
2005–2006	Vysočina Jihlava	28	(0)
2006–2009	Zlín	58	(3)

International career^{‡}
1994–1997	Czech Republic U-21	9	(0)
1996–1997	Czech Republic	3	(0)

Managerial career
- 2011–2015: Vysočina Jihlava (assistant)
- 2019–2023: Velká Bíteš
- 2024: Zbrojovka Brno (assistant)
- 2024–: Zbrojovka Brno B
- 2025: Zbrojovka Brno (interim)
- * Club domestic league appearances and goals as of 17 July 2009 ‡ National team caps and goals as of 15 December 2009

Marek Zúbek (born 5 August 1975, Czechoslovakia) is a footballer who represented the Czech Republic.

Zúbek spent most of his Czech First League career at 1. FC Brno. In 1996, he won the Talent of the Year award at the Czech Footballer of the Year awards.

On 24 March 2025, Zúbek was appointed as manager of Zbrojovka Brno.
