= Milan Pacanda =

Czech footballer (born 1978)

Personal information
- Full name: Milan Pacanda
- Date of birth: 28 February 1978 (age 48)
- Place of birth: Brno, Czechoslovakia
- Height: 1.75 m (5 ft 9 in)
- Positions: Attacking midfielder; striker

Youth career
- 1986–1995: Boby Brno

Senior career*
| Years | Team | Apps | (Gls) |
| 1995–2004 | Brno | 158 | (48) |
| 2004–2007 | Sparta Praha | 20 | (6) |
| 2005–2006 | →Wacker Tirol Innsbruck (loan) | 22 | (7) |
| 2006–2008 | Brno | 30 | (4) |
| 2008 | →Tescoma Zlín (loan) | 8 | (0) |
| 2008–2009 | →Shakhter Karagandy (loan) | 7 | (3) |
| 2009–2010 | →Znojmo (loan) | | |
| 2010–2011 | →Bodva Moldava nad Bodvou (loan) | 24 | (4) |
| 2011–2012 | Znojmo | 16 | (3) |

International career
| 1997–1999 | Czech Republic U21 | 7 | (1) |
| 1998 | Czech Republic B | 2 | (0) |
- * Club domestic league appearances and goals

Milan Pacanda (born 28 February 1978 in Brno) is a retired Czech football forward who played for numerous clubs in the Czech Republic, Austria, Kazakhstan and Slovakia, but is most notable for over a decade spent with Brno.
