= Martin Gjorgievski =

Macedonian footballer (born 2004)

Personal information
- Date of birth: 28 February 2005 (age 21)
- Place of birth: Ohrid, Macedonia
- Height: 1.83 m (6 ft 0 in)
- Position: Central midfielder

Team information
- Current team: Dukla Banská Bystrica (on loan from Zbrojovka Brno)
- Number: 28

Youth career
- –2021: Brera Strumica

Senior career*
Years	Team	Apps	(Gls)
2021–2025	Brera Strumica	83	(13)
2025–	Zbrojovka Brno	14	(1)
2025	Zbrojovka Brno B	1	(0)
2026–	→ Dukla Banská Bystrica (loan)	7	(1)

International career^{‡}
2021–2022	North Macedonia U16	5	(1)
2021–2022	North Macedonia U17	11	(1)
2022–2023	North Macedonia U18	10	(1)
2022–2024	North Macedonia U19	12	(1)
2024–	North Macedonia U21	14	(1)
- * Club domestic league appearances and goals as of 10 November 2026 ‡ National team caps and goals as of 9 June 2026

Martin Gjorgievski (Macedonian: Мартин Ѓоргиевски; born 28 February 2005) is a Macedonian professional footballer who plays as a midfielder for Slovak club Dukla Banská Bystrica on loan from Zbrojovka Brno.

== Club career ==
Born in Ohrid, North Macedonia, Gjorgievski joined Brera Strumica at youth level. He was promoted to the first team squad in August 2021. He gradually worked his way up to the first team, becoming a mainstay and integral part of the starting lineup and team captain.

=== Zbrojovka Brno ===
After excellent performances in the team, he became a sought-after player, with Dundee, Pafos, Rakow and leading Macedonian teams showing interest in him. In September 2025, on the last day of the transfer period he signed a long-term contract with Zbrojovka Brno. He was slow to get into the starting lineup and only appeared as a substitute. The reason was an unclear position on the field and a lot of competition.
He made his first appearance in starting line-up in a Czech Cup match against Teplice and significantly contributed to the 2:1 win. He won a penalty and scored the winning goal. During the winter break, Zbrojovka considered the possibility of loaning him out, but in the end, they kept the player.
He scored his first league goal on 18 March 2026 in the Brno derby against Artis, when he headed in a pass from Jan Juroška in the 85th minute and helped his team win 2:0.

On 11 September 2026, Gjorgievski joined Slovak side Dukla Banská Bystrica on a half-year loan deal without an option to make the transfer permanent.

== International career ==
Gjorgievski has represented North Macedonia at youth international level.

== Honours ==
FK Zbrojovka Brno

- Czech Second League: 2025–26
