= Lukáš Penxa =

Czech footballer (born 2004)

Personal information
- Date of birth: 6 June 2004 (age 22)
- Place of birth: Czech Republic
- Positions: Midfielder; wingback

Team information
- Current team: Zbrojovka Brno

Youth career
- Sparta Prague

Senior career*
Years	Team	Apps	(Gls)
2022–2026	Sparta Prague	2	(0)
2022–2026	Sparta Prague B	53	(12)
2025	→ Jablonec (loan)	4	(0)
2026	→ Dukla Prague (loan)	13	(1)
2026–	Zbrojovka Brno	0	(0)

International career^{‡}
2022–2023	Czech Republic U19	6	(0)
2024–2025	Czech Republic U20	5	(0)
2025–	Czech Republic U21	2	(0)
- * Club domestic league appearances and goals as of 25 June 2026 ‡ National team caps and goals as of 25 June 2026

Lukáš Penxa (born 6 June 2004) is a Czech professional footballer who plays as a midfielder or wingback for Zbrojovka Brno.

== Career ==
Penxa spent his youth development years in the academy of Sparta Prague. He made his senior football debut with Sparta Prague B, playing in the Czech National Football League. During his time with the reserve team, he established himself as a prominent winger, scoring 12 goals in 53 appearances. He also made one appearance for the senior team of Sparta Prague.

In the 2025–26 season, Penxa was loaned out to gain top-flight experience in the Czech First League. He spent the first half of the season on loan at Jablonec, where he made 7 appearances and scored once, across their A- and B-teams. In February 2026 he moved on loan to Dukla Prague for the second half of the season with an option to make the transfer permanent. He scored his first Czech First League goal in Dukla's 2–0 home win against Jablonec in March 2026.

In June 2026, Penxa completed a permanent transfer to Zbrojovka Brno, signing a multi-year contract.

== International career ==
Penxa has represented the Czech Republic at various youth international levels, including the Under-19 and Under-20 teams. In 2025, he made his debut for the Czech Republic U21 team.

== Personal life ==
His younger brother, Ondřej, is also a professional footballer who progressed through the academy of Sparta Prague and played alongside Lukáš in the club's reserve team.
