= Daniel Vašulín =

Czech footballer (born 1998)

Personal information
- Date of birth: 11 June 1998 (age 28)
- Place of birth: Hlinsko, Czech Republic
- Height: 1.95 m (6 ft 5 in)
- Position: Striker

Team information
- Current team: Zbrojovka Brno

Youth career
- 2005–2009: FC Hlinsko
- 2009–2017: Chrudim

Senior career*
Years	Team	Apps	(Gls)
2017–2020	Chrudim	86	(20)
2020–2024	Hradec Králové	111	(28)
2024–2026	Viktoria Plzeň	36	(4)
2025	→ Sigma Olomouc (loan)	15	(9)
2026–	Zbrojovka Brno	8	(4)

International career^{‡}
2019	Czech Republic U20	2	(0)
2026–	Czech Republic	1	(0)
- * Club domestic league appearances and goals as of 16 September 2026 ‡ National team caps and goals as of 29 September 2026

Daniel Vašulín (born 11 June 1998) is a Czech professional footballer who plays as a striker for Zbrojovka Brno and the Czech Republic national team.

== Club career ==
A youth product of his local club FC Hlinsko, Vašulín moved to the youth academy of Chrudim in 2009. In 2017, he was promoted to their senior team as they played in the Czech third division. During this time, he also worked in sportwear retail. He helped Chrudim achieve promotion to the Czech National Football League, the Czech second division. On 6 August 2020, he transferred to Hradec Králové. That season, he helped Hradec Králové win the 2020–21 Czech National Football League and earned promotion to the Czech First League.

On 18 June 2024, he transferred to Viktoria Plzeň.

On 17 July 2025, Vašulín joined a Sigma Olomouc on a one-year loan deal without option to buy.

On 3 June 2026, Vašulín signed a multi-year contract with Zbrojovka Brno.

== International career ==
Vašulín was a youth international for the Czech Republic, having played twice for the Czech Republic U20 in 2019.

On 29 September 2026, Vašulín made his debut for the Czech Republic national team in a 2026–27 UEFA Nations League A game against England.

== Honours ==
Hradec Králové

- Czech National Football League: 2020–21
