= Alex Marković =

Serbian footballer

Personal information
- Date of birth: 10 June 2002 (age 24)
- Place of birth: Subotica, FR Yugoslavia
- Height: 1.96 m (6 ft 5 in)
- Position: Centre back

Team information
- Current team: Karviná (on loan from Zbrojovka Brno)

Youth career
- –2019: Partizan
- 2019: Crotone
- 2019–2021: Ascoli

Senior career*
Years	Team	Apps	(Gls)
2021–2022	MTK Budapest	0	(0)
2023–2024	Narva	26	(1)
2024–2025	Podbrezová	47	(1)
2026–	Zbrojovka Brno	7	(0)
2026	Zbrojovka Brno B	1	(0)
2026–	→ Karviná (loan)	0	(0)

International career^{‡}
2019	Serbia U18	2	(0)
- * Club domestic league appearances and goals as of 25 June 2026 ‡ National team caps and goals as of 25 June 2026

Alex Marković (Serbian Cyrillic: Алекс Марковић; born 10 June 2002) is a Serbian footballer who plays for Czech club Karviná in the second-tier Czech National Football League on loan from Zbrojovka Brno.

== Club career ==
He is a graduate of Partizan, from where he left for Italy at the age of 16, where he played for the youth teams of Crotone and 24 matches for Ascoli in Primavera 1. Then he went to the Hungarian team MTK Budapest, where he only made 1 start in the domestic cup. He played in the highest Estonian competition with the Narva club and also won the cup scoring a goal from a penalty in the final.. He defended the Podbrezová jersey for two years, from where he transferred to Zbrojovka Brno at the end of January 2026.

On 20 August 2026, Marković joined Karviná on a one-year loan deal with an option to make the transfer permanent.

== Honours ==
=== Club ===
Narva

- Estonian Cup: 2022–23
