= Tadeáš Vachoušek =

Czech footballer (born 2002)

Personal information
- Full name: Tadeáš Vachoušek
- Date of birth: January 11, 2004 (age 22)
- Place of birth: Czech Republic
- Height: 1.84 m (6 ft 0 in)
- Position: Midfielder

Team information
- Current team: Zbrojovka Brno (on loan from Teplice)
- Number: 14

Youth career
- 2010-2020: Teplice

Senior career*
Years	Team	Apps	(Gls)
2020–	Teplice	45	(4)
2021–2024	Teplice B	36	(22)
2024	→ Vlašim (loan)	14	(3)
2025–	→ Zbrojovka Brno (loan)	44	(13)

International career^{‡}
2020	Czech Republic U-16	3	(0)
2021-2022	Czech Republic U-18	4	(0)
2023	Czech Republic U-19	4	(0)
2023−2024	Czech Republic U-20	7	(0)
- * Club domestic league appearances and goals as of 28 May 2026 ‡ National team caps and goals as of 31 July 2025

Tadeáš Vachoušek (born 16 August 2002) is a Czech footballer who plays as a midfielder for FC Zbrojovka Brno on loan from Teplice.

== Career ==
Vachoušek started his professional career with the youth system of Teplice. He was promoted to the first team, where he began to make appearances in the Czech First League. Vachoušek gained attention for his pace, technical skills, and finishing ability. He is considered one of the club's promising young players.

=== Loan to Vlašim ===
In 2023, Vachoušek was loaned to Vlašim for a season to gain more first-team experience.

=== Loan to Zbrojovka Brno ===
After his loan spell with Vlašim, Vachoušek moved to Zbrojovka Brno, where he continues to develop as part of the club's attacking unit. He appreciated the demanding style of coach Martin Svědík.

== Personal life ==
His father is former Czech national team player Štěpán Vachoušek. His brother Matyáš also plays football.
