= Karel Večeřa =

Czech football manager (born 1955)

Personal information
- Date of birth: 9 October 1955 (age 71)
- Place of birth: Ivančice, Czechoslovakia
- Position: Defender

Youth career
- 1961–1974: FC Zbrojovka Brno

Senior career*
Years	Team	Apps	(Gls)
1974–1976	Zbrojovka Brno		
1976–1978	KPS Brno		
1978–1979	Dukla Tábor		
1979–1981	Zbrojovka Brno		
1981–1982	VP Frýdek-Místek		
1982	Zbrojovka Brno		
1982	KPS Brno		

Managerial career
- 1994: FC Boby Brno
- 1996–1998: FC Boby Brno
- 1999–2001: FK Drnovice
- 2001–2003: 1. FC Brno
- 2004–2006: FC Vysočina Jihlava
- 2006–2009: FC Baník Ostrava
- 2010–2011: 1. FC Brno
- * Club domestic league appearances and goals

Karel Večeřa (born 9 October 1955 in Ivančice) is a Czech football manager and former player.

In the 2006–09 season he led FC Baník Ostrava. He was very popular and known for his bet with fans of FC Baník Ostrava. Fans said that if Baník ends in a third position in season 2007–08, allowing them to play UEFA Cup, and if he will shave his moustache, they will buy him 1922 bars of chocolate, as the football club was founded in 1922. Fans can saw him without his moustache, which he had for 34 years, as Baník ended in a third position that year.

As active player, Večeřa played for several clubs, including FC Zbrojovka Brno and VP Frýdek-Místek. As a manager, he coached among others FK Drnovice, 1. FC Brno and FC Vysočina Jihlava.
