= Colin Andrew =

Czech footballer (born 2004

Personal information
- Date of birth: 25 February 2004 (age 22)
- Place of birth: Prague, Czech Republic
- Height: 1.81 m (5 ft 11 in)
- Position: Goalkeeper

Team information
- Current team: Zbrojovka Brno

Youth career
- –2016: Praga Praha
- 2016–2017: SK Hostivař
- 2017–2020: Motorlet Prague
- 2020–2022: Dynamo České Budějovice

Senior career*
Years	Team	Apps	(Gls)
2022–2026	Dynamo České Budějovice	21	(0)
2022	→ Spartak Soběslav (loan)		
2022–2026	→ Dynamo České Budějovice B	43	(0)
2026–	Zbrojovka Brno	0	(0)
- * Club domestic league appearances and goals as of 16 January 2026

Colin Andrew (born 25 February 2004) is a Czech professional footballer who plays as a goalkeeper for Zbrojovka Brno.

== Early life ==
Andrew was born on 25 February 2004 in Prague, Czech Republic to a Nigerian father and a Czech mother. Besides playing football, he has worked as a football referee.

== Career ==
As a youth player, Andrew joined the youth academy of TJ Praga Praha. In 2016, he joined the youth academy of SK Hostivař. One year later, he joined the youth academy of FK Motorlet Prague.

Following his stint there, he joined the youth academy of SK Dynamo České Budějovice in 2017 and was promoted to the club's senior team in 2022. On 1 February 2025, he debuted for them during a 0–0 home draw with FK Dukla Prague in the league. Czech newspaper Deník wrote in 2025 that he "is a household name in football circles throughout the Czech Republic".

On 12 February 2026, Andrew signed a multi-year contract with Zbrojovka Brno.
