= Eric Hunal =

Czech footballer (born 2005)

Personal information
- Date of birth: 21 January 2005 (age 21)
- Place of birth: Czech Republic
- Position: Defender

Team information
- Current team: FC Zbrojovka Brno

Youth career
- 2011–2016: Dukla Prague
- 2016–2022: Slavia Prague

Senior career*
Years	Team	Apps	(Gls)
2021–2025	Slavia Prague	0	(0)
2021–2025	Slavia Prague B	70	(0)
2025–2026	Dukla Prague	22	(0)
2026–	Zbrojovka Brno	0	(0)

International career^{‡}
2022	Czech Republic U17	4	(0)
2022–2023	Czech Republic U18	7	(0)
2023–2024	Czech Republic U19	8	(0)
2024–2025	Czech Republic U20	6	(0)
2025–	Czech Republic U21	5	(0)
- * Club domestic league appearances and goals as of 25 June 2026 ‡ National team caps and goals as of 25 June 2026

Eric Hunal (born 21 January 2005) is a Czech professional footballer who plays as a defender for FC Zbrojovka Brno.

== Career ==
Hunal began his youth football development with FK Dukla Prague before moving to the academy of SK Slavia Prague in 2016. He progressed into senior football through the club's reserve team, Slavia Prague B, playing in both the Czech National Football League and the Bohemian Football League.

In July 2025, Hunal transferred to FK Dukla Prague, making his debut in the top-tier Czech First League during the 2025–26 season, where he appeared in 22 league matches.

In July 2026, Hunal signed a multi-year contract with FC Zbrojovka Brno following a permanent transfer from SK Slavia Prague.

== International career ==
Hunal has represented the Czech Republic at various youth international levels, including the Under-17, Under-18, Under-19, and Under-20 teams. In 2025, he made his debut for the Czech Republic U21 team, participating in the 2027 UEFA Under-21 Championship qualification matches.

== Personal life ==
Hunal is the son of former Czech professional footballer Tomáš Hunal.
