= Lukáš Kříž =

Czech ice hockey player

- Born: August 18, 1993 (age 32) České Budějovice, Czech Republic
- Height: 5 ft 10 in (178 cm)
- Weight: 193 lb (88 kg; 13 st 11 lb)
- Position: Defence
- Shoots: Left
- Czech 2. team Former teams: HC Tábor; Motor České Budějovice; MsHK Žilina; SK Horácká Slavia Třebíč
- NHL draft: Undrafted
- Playing career: 2012–present

Lukáš Kříž (born August 18, 1993) is a Czech professional ice hockey player. He is currently playing HC Tábor ( Maxa liga ) Czech 2.

Kříž made his Czech Extraliga debut playing with Motor České Budějovice during the 2011-12 Czech Extraliga season. He also played for MsHK Žilina of the Tipsport Liga.
