= Oliver Velich =

Czech footballer

Personal information
- Date of birth: 12 June 2001 (age 25)
- Place of birth: Lázně Bělohrad, Czech Republic
- Height: 1.87 m (6 ft 2 in)
- Position: Striker

Team information
- Current team: Zbrojovka Brno
- Number: 9

Youth career
- 2007–2015: SK Lázně Bělohrad
- 2016–2019: Jablonec

Senior career*
Years	Team	Apps	(Gls)
2019–2025	Jablonec	15	(0)
2019–2025	→→ Jablonec B	78	(21)
2020–2022	→ Varnsdorf (loan)	39	(4)
2024–2025	→ Varnsdorf (loan)	13	(5)
2025–	Zbrojovka Brno	27	(7)
- * Club domestic league appearances and goals as of 28 May 2026

Oliver Velich (born 12 June 2001) is a Czech professional footballer who plays as a striker for FC Zbrojovka Brno.

== Club career ==
He started playing football in his hometown of Lázně Bělohrad, from where he moved to FK Jablonec at the age of 15.

=== Jablonec ===
Velich began his professional career with FK Jablonec, a club competing in the Czech First League. He played mainly in the reserve team playing in the Bohemian Football League. Velich made his debut in the first team on 6 October 2019 in a home match against Slavia Prague. He replaced Miloš Kratochvíl in the 87th minute.

=== Loan to Varnsdorf ===
In order to gain more playing time, Velich was loaned out to FK Varnsdorf in the Czech National Football League. During his time there, he became a regular starter and contributed with strong performances up front, showcasing his physicality and goal-scoring instinct.

=== Zbrojovka Brno ===
His performances at the end of the 2024–25 season earned him a transfer to Zbrojovka Brno. At Brno, he established himself as a promising striker, making regular appearances and playing a key role in the club's attacking line.

== Style of play ==
Velich is known for his physical presence, aerial ability, and finishing skills in the box. Coach Martin Svědík values him for his hard work, intensity and direct approach to the goal.

== Personal life ==
His sister Charlotte plays basketball for Italian Serie A1 side Brixia Basket. He is a fan of Bayern Munich and admires Robert Lewandowski.
