= Lukas Saal =

Czech footballer (born 2004)

Personal information
- Date of birth: 17 February 2006 (age 20)
- Place of birth: California, U.S.
- Position: Midfielder

Team information
- Current team: Zbrojovka Brno
- Number: 20

Youth career
- 2013–2016: Slavia Prague
- 2016–2024: Sparta Prague

Senior career*
Years	Team	Apps	(Gls)
2023–2024	Sparta Prague B	1	(0)
2025–	Zbrojovka Brno	14	(0)
2025	→ Kroměříž (loan)	22	(1)

International career^{‡}
2021–2022	Czech Republic U16	5	(0)
2022–2023	Czech Republic U17	12	(0)
2023–2024	Czech Republic U18	5	(0)
2024–2025	Czech Republic U19	10	(0)
2025–	Czech Republic U20	6	(0)
- * Club domestic league appearances and goals as of 12 August 2026 ‡ National team caps and goals as of 12 August 2026

Lukas Saal (born 17 February 2006) is a Czech professional footballer who plays as a midfielder for Zbrojovka Brno.

== Career ==
In February 2025, he transferred from Sparta to Zbrojovka.

In August 2025, Saal was sent on loan to the Czech National Football League club SK Hanácká Slavia Kroměříž to secure regular playing time, where he subsequently established himself as a key member of the midfield rotation.

On 26 April 2026, Saal scored his first goal for Kroměříž.

Following the completion of successful loan spell at Kroměříž, Saal returned to FC Zbrojovka Brno to rejoin their first-team and completed the entire training with the league A team and earned a place on the Zbrojovka roster.

In July 2026, he signed a long-term contract with Zbrojovka.

== International career ==
Saal has represented the Czech Republic at various youth international levels, including the U19 and U20 teams.

== Personal life ==
He has a Czech mother who went to the United States to study. His father is from Michigan. He lived in California until he was five, then the family moved to Prague. Thanks to his parents, he has both Czech and American citizenship.
