= Stanislav Hofmann =

Czech association footballer

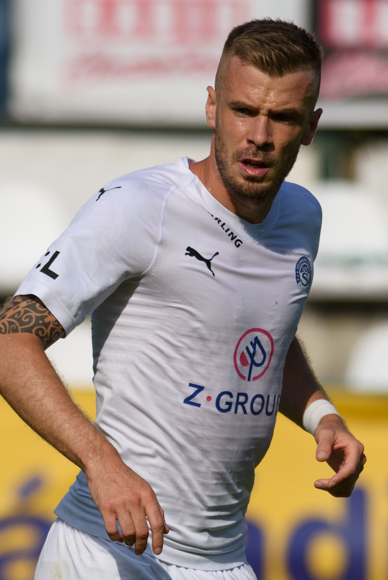
- Hofmann in 2020

Personal information
- Date of birth: 17 June 1990 (age 36)
- Place of birth: Bečov, Czech Republic
- Height: 1.91 m (6 ft 3 in)
- Position: Centre-back

Team information
- Current team: Zbrojovka Brno
- Number: 66

Youth career
- 1996–2009: Baník Most

Senior career*
| Years | Team | Apps | (Gls) |
| 2008–2012 | Baník Most | 102 | (10) |
| 2012–2025 | Slovácko | 261 | (22) |
| 2013–2015 | → Baník Sokolov (loan) | 58 | (10) |
| 2025– | Zbrojovka Brno | 33 | (4) |

International career
| 2005 | Czech Republic U16 | 1 | (0) |
| 2008–2009 | Czech Republic U19 | 5 | (0) |
| 2011 | Czech Republic U20 | 1 | (0) |
- * Club domestic league appearances and goals as of 28 May 2026

Stanislav Hofmann (born 17 June 1990) is a Czech professional footballer who plays as a centre-back for Czech club Zbrojovka Brno.

== Club career ==
Hofmann is a youth product of his local club Baník Most since the age of 5, and began his senior career with them in 2008. He transferred to the Czech First League club Slovácko on 18 May 2012. He was on loan with Baník Sokolov from 2013 to 2015, before returning to Slovácko where he became a consistent starter. He extended the contract with the club on 22 June 2021 after 9 seasons with the club. Hofmann helped the club Slovácko win their first domestic trophy ever, the 2021–22 Czech Cup, where he assisted his side's second goal in a 3–1 win on 18 May 2022. As of October 2022, he is 4th all-time in appearances for Slovácko with 197 appearances.

On 8 February 2025, Hofmann signed a contract with Zbrojovka Brno.

== International career ==
Hofmann played for the youth international teams up to the Czech Republic U20s.

== Personal life ==
Hofmann married his wife Libuše in June 2018, and has 2 children.

== Honours ==
Slovácko

- Czech Cup: 2021–22
