= Miloš Kopečný =

Czech footballer (born 1993)

Personal information
- Full name: Miloš Kopečný
- Date of birth: 26 December 1993 (age 32)
- Place of birth: Holešov, Czech Republic
- Height: 1.78 m (5 ft 10 in)
- Position: Defender

Team information
- Current team: Zlín
- Number: 23

Senior career*
Years	Team	Apps	(Gls)
20??–2014	Hanácká Slavia Kroměříž	?	(?)
2014–2018	Fastav Zlín	60	(6)
2014	→ Spartak Hulín (loan)	?	(?)
2016	→ Baník Sokolov (loan)	12	(0)
2018–2019	Hradec Králové	34	(2)
2020–2021	Dynamo České Budějovice	4	(0)
2020–2021	→ Senica (loan)	19	(0)
2021	→ Silon Táborsko (loan)	10	(1)
2022–2024	Opava	64	(7)
2024–	Zlín	55	(2)
- * Club domestic league appearances and goals as of 27 May 2026

Miloš Kopečný (born 26 December 1993) is a Czech footballer who as a defender for Zlín.

== Club career ==
=== FK Senica ===
Kopečný made his Fortuna Liga debut for Senica against DAC Dunajská Streda on 20 September 2020. He appeared in the starting-XI and played the entirety of the 2:4 defeat.

=== FC Zlín ===
On 23 July 2024, Kopečný signed a contract with Zlín.
