= Štěpán Langer =

Czech footballer

Personal information
- Date of birth: 16 August 2000 (age 26)
- Place of birth: Přerov, Czech Republic
- Height: 1.79 m (5 ft 10 in)
- Position: Midfielder

Team information
- Current team: Zbrojovka Brno
- Number: 7

Youth career
- 2009−2014: Viktorie Přerov
- 2014−2019: Sigma Olomouc

Senior career*
Years	Team	Apps	(Gls)
2019−2025	Sigma Olomouc	54	(1)
2019−2023	→ Sigma Olomouc B	100	(26)
2020−2021	→ Prostějov (loan)	16	(0)
2026−	Zbrojovka Brno	5	(0)
- * Club domestic league appearances and goals as of 10 June 2026

Štěpán Langer (born 16 August 2000) is a Czech footballer who currently plays as a midfielder for FC Zbrojovka Brno.

== Club career ==
On 12 February 2026, he was transferred to Zbrojovka Brno.

== Personal life ==
He is very active on social media, where he advises young players on how to improve their performance using biohacking. He is an influencer.
