= Martin Rymarenko =

Slovak footballer

Personal information
- Date of birth: 9 April 1999 (age 27)
- Place of birth: Banská Bystrica, Slovakia
- Height: 1.76 m (5 ft 9 in)
- Positions: Forward; winger

Team information
- Current team: Zbrojovka Brno
- Number: 11

Youth career
- 2008–2009: ŠK Obecný podnik lesov Poniky
- 2009–2010: Jupie Futbalová škola Mareka Hamšíka
- 2010–2016: Dukla Banská Bystrica
- 2016–2018: Dunajská Streda

Senior career*
Years	Team	Apps	(Gls)
2018−	Dunajská Streda	5	(0)
2019	→ Komárno (loan)	9	(0)
2019–2021	→ Šamorín (loan)	46	(22)
2021–2022	→ Ružomberok (loan)	23	(4)
2022–2023	→ Dukla Banská Bystrica (loan)	24	(6)
2023–2025	Dukla Banská Bystrica	63	(25)
2025–	Zbrojovka Brno	27	(6)

International career^{‡}
2017	Slovakia U18	1	(0)
2017	Slovakia U19	10	(1)
- * Club domestic league appearances and goals as of 28 May 2026 ‡ National team caps and goals as of 13 Nov 2017

Martin Rymarenko (born 9 April 1999) is a Slovak footballer who plays as a forward for Zbrojovka Brno.

== Club career ==
=== DAC Dunajská Streda ===
Rymarenko made his Fortuna Liga debut for DAC against MFK Zemplín Michalovce on 25 July 2021. He came on to the pitch in the first half as a replacement for Brahim Moumou.

=== Ružomberok ===
On 6 September 2021, Rymarenko signed a one-year loan contract with Ružomberok. He was welcomed as a promising player with the aim of improving the offence of Liptáci.

=== Zbrojovka Brno ===
On 4 June 2025, Rymarenko signed a contract with Zbrojovka Brno.
