= Bienvenue Kanakimana =

Burundian footballer (born 1999)

Personal information
- Date of birth: 28 December 1999 (age 26)
- Place of birth: Bujumbura, Burundi
- Height: 1.76 m (5 ft 9 in)
- Position: Winger

Team information
- Current team: Zbrojovka Brno
- Number: 19

Senior career*
Years	Team	Apps	(Gls)
2018–2019	Aigle Noir Makamba		(23)
2019–2024	Vyškov	65	(23)
2019	→ Atlanta United 2 (loan)	16	(7)
2020	→ Pinzgau Saalfelden (loan)	4	(0)
2020	→ Xinjiang Tianshan (loan)	5	(1)
2024–2025	Jablonec	36	(5)
2025–	Zbrojovka Brno	30	(8)

International career^{‡}
- Burundi U17
2019	Burundi U20	3	(1)
2018–	Burundi U23	4	(1)
2019–	Burundi	33	(8)
- * Club domestic league appearances and goals as of 20 November 2026 ‡ National team caps and goals as of 20 November 2026

Bienvenue Kanakimana (born 28 December 1999) is a Burundian professional footballer who plays as a winger for Zbrojovka Brno and the Burundi national team.

== Club career ==
Kanakimana spent the 2018 season with Aigle Noir of the Burundi Premier League, finishing as the league's top scorer with 23 goals across all competitions and leading his team to the league title. He was subsequently transferred to MFK Vyškov on 1 January 2019 and was later loaned to Atlanta United 2 on 12 April for the remainder of the season.

On 17 February 2021, Kanakimana permanently joined USL Championship side Colorado Springs Switchbacks. On 7 May 2021, Kanakimana and Colorado Springs mutually agreed to terminate his contract at the club due to visa issues.

On 20 January 2024, Kanakimana signed a multi-year contract with Czech First League club FK Jablonec.

On 27 June 2025, Kanakimana signed a multi-year contract with Czech National Football League club Zbrojovka Brno.

== International career ==
In September 2019, Kanakimana was called into the Burundi national team for its 2022 World Cup qualifiers against Tanzania. He made his senior international debut on 4 September 2019.
