= Dominik Sváček =

Czech footballer

Personal information
- Date of birth: 24 February 1997 (age 29)
- Place of birth: Klatovy, Czech Republic
- Height: 1.92 m (6 ft 3 1/2 in)
- Position: Goalkeeper

Team information
- Current team: Žilina (on loan from Zbrojovka Brno)
- Number: 29

Senior career*
Years	Team	Apps	(Gls)
2016–2024	Viktoria Plzeň	1	(0)
2019–2024	→ Viktoria Plzeň B	20	(0)
2021–2023	→ Liptovský Mikuláš (loan)	35	(0)
2024	→ Zbrojovka Brno (loan)	12	(0)
2024–	Zbrojovka Brno	8	(0)
2026–	→ Žilina (loan)	4	(0)

International career
2013	Czech Republic U16	2	(0)
2013	Czech Republic U17	2	(0)
2015	Czech Republic U18	1	(0)
2015	Czech Republic U19	4	(0)
2017–2018	Czech Republic U20	5	(0)
- * Club domestic league appearances and goals as of 25 May 2026

Dominik Sváček (born 24 February 1997) is a Czech professional footballer who plays as a goalkeeper for Slovak First Football League club Žilina, on loan from Zbrojovka Brno.

== Club career ==
=== Viktoria Plzeň ===
He played his first match for Viktoria Plzeň on 27 May 2017 against Vysočina Jihlava. He played last 27 minutes when he came on the pitch for injured Petr Bolek.

Since then, he played mainly for reserve team in Bohemian Football League.

On 20 February 2024, Viktoria Plzeň loaned Sváček to Zbrojovka Brno on a half-year loan deal with option to make transfer permanent.

== International career ==
He had played international football at under-16, 17, 18, 19 and 20 level for Czech Republic U16, Czech Republic U17, Czech Republic U18, Czech Republic U19 and Czech Republic U20. He played in 14 matches in national teams.
