= Antonín Vaníček =

Czech footballer

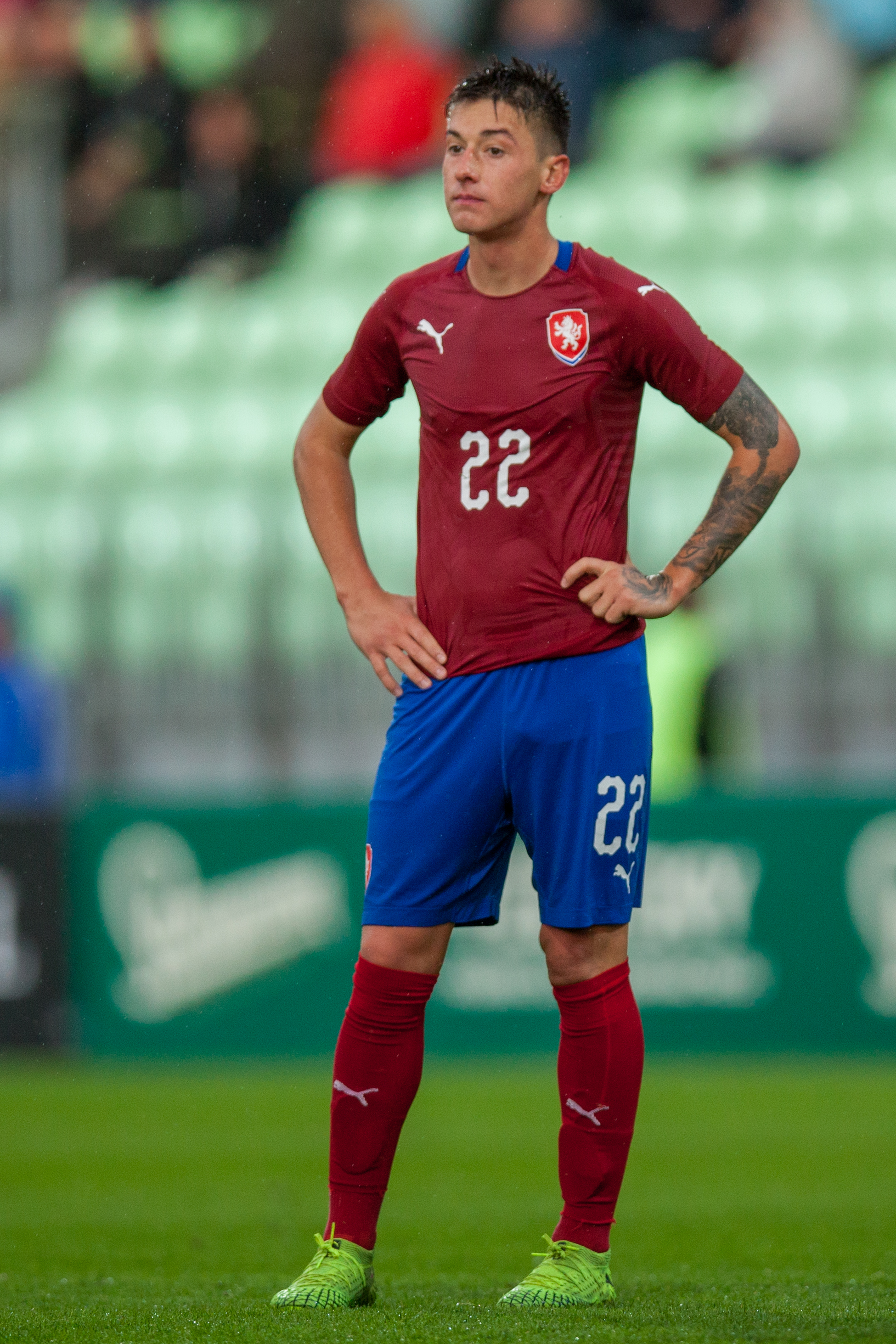
- Vaníček with Czech Republic in 2019

Personal information
- Date of birth: 22 April 1998 (age 28)
- Position: Midfielder

Team information
- Current team: Zbrojovka Brno

Youth career
- 2005–2007: Libuš
- 2007–2008: Sparta Krč
- 2008–2017: Bohemians 1905

Senior career*
Years	Team	Apps	(Gls)
2017–2022	Bohemians 1905	111	(6)
2021	→ Jablonec (loan)	12	(0)
2022–2025	Mladá Boleslav	17	(0)
2022–2025	→→ Mladá Boleslav B	19	(3)
2024–2025	→ Viktoria Žižkov (loan)	22	(4)
2025–2026	Dynamo České Budějovice	26	(10)
2026–	Zbrojovka Brno	8	(3)

International career
2014	Czech Republic U16	5	(2)
2015	Czech Republic U17	6	(0)
2015–2016	Czech Republic U18	7	(1)
2017–2021	Czech Republic U21	19	(1)
- * Club domestic league appearances and goals as of 16 September 2026

Antonín Vaníček (born 22 April 1998) is a Czech professional footballer who plays as a midfielder for Zbrojovka Brno in the Czech First League.

He made his league debut in Bohemians 1905's Czech First League 1–1 draw at Sparta Prague on 30 July 2017. He scored his first league goal on 28 October in Bohemians' 1–1 home draw against Zlín.

On 20 June 2025, Vaníček signed a two-year contract with Czech National Football League club Dynamo České Budějovice.

On 17 July 2026, Vaníček signed a multi-year contract with Czech First League club Zbrojovka Brno.
