= Denis Granečný =

Czech footballer (born 1998)

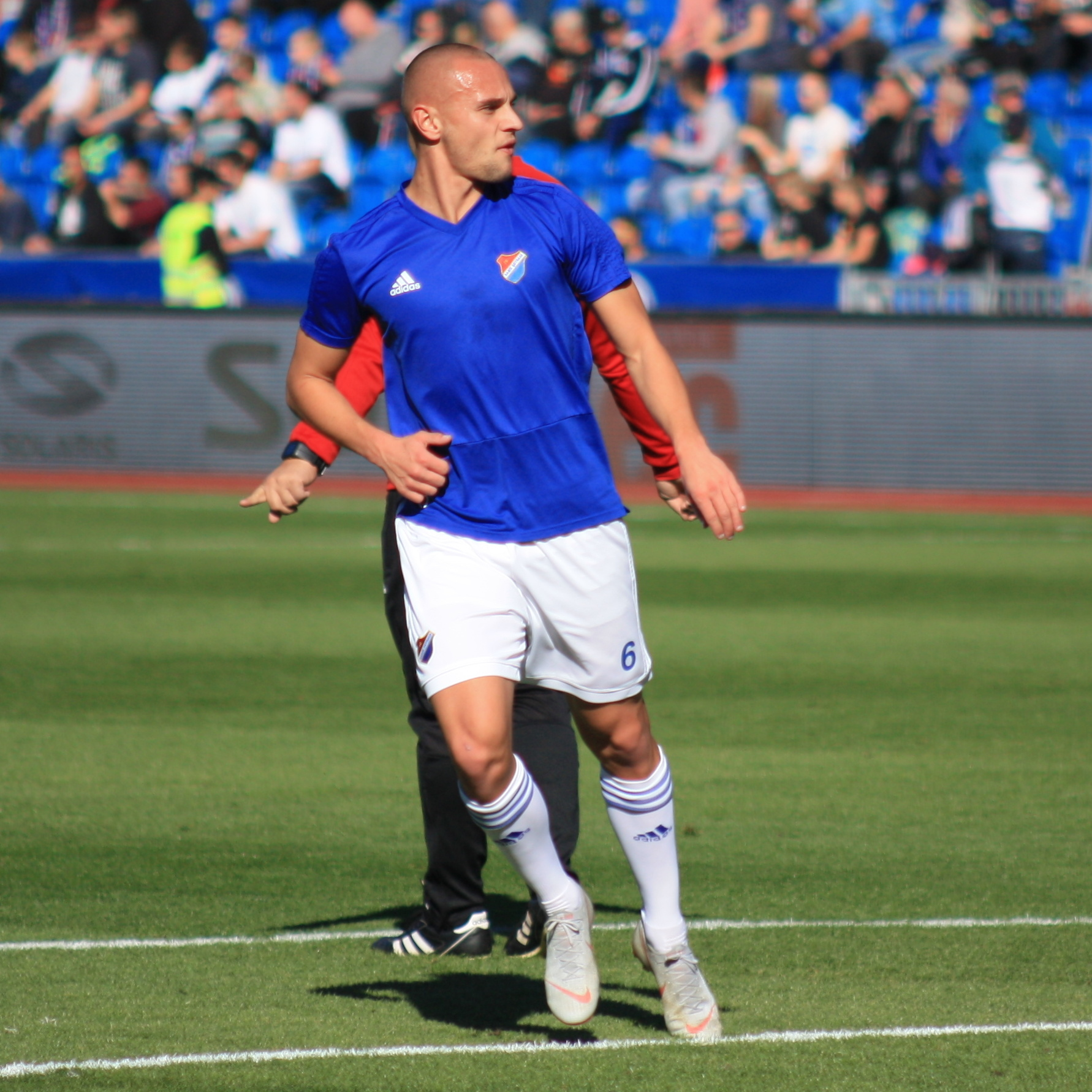
- Granečný playing for Baník Ostrava in 2018

Personal information
- Date of birth: 7 September 1998 (age 28)
- Place of birth: Ostrava, Czech Republic
- Height: 1.80 m (5 ft 11 in)
- Position: Left back

Team information
- Current team: FC Zbrojovka Brno
- Number: 18

Youth career
- Baník Ostrava

Senior career*
Years	Team	Apps	(Gls)
2016–2022	Baník Ostrava	87	(1)
2020	→ České Budějovice (loan)	1	(0)
2020–2021	→ Emmen (loan)	2	(0)
2022	→ Mezőkövesd (loan)	5	(0)
2022–	Zbrojovka Brno	100	(5)

International career^{‡}
2013	Czech Republic U16	2	(0)
2015	Czech Republic U17	11	(0)
2015	Czech Republic U18	4	(0)
2016	Czech Republic U19	18	(0)
2016–2018	Czech Republic U20	12	(0)
2018–2021	Czech Republic U21	13	(0)
- * Club domestic league appearances and goals as of 28 May 2026 ‡ National team caps and goals as of 16 February 2023

Denis Granečný (born 7 September 1998) is a Czech professional footballer who plays as a defender for FC Zbrojovka Brno.

== Career ==
=== Club career ===
He made his senior league debut for Baník Ostrava on 14 February 2016 in a Czech First League 0–3 loss at Mladá Boleslav.

On 4 February 2020, Granečný joined Dynamo České Budějovice on a six-month loan deal. After making only one appearance for the club, he was loaned out again; this time a season-long loan to Dutch Eredivisie club FC Emmen on 13 August 2020. On 24 January 2022, he was loaned to Mezőkövesd in Hungary.
