= Městský fotbalový stadion Srbská =

Stadium in Brno, Czech Republic

- Srbská
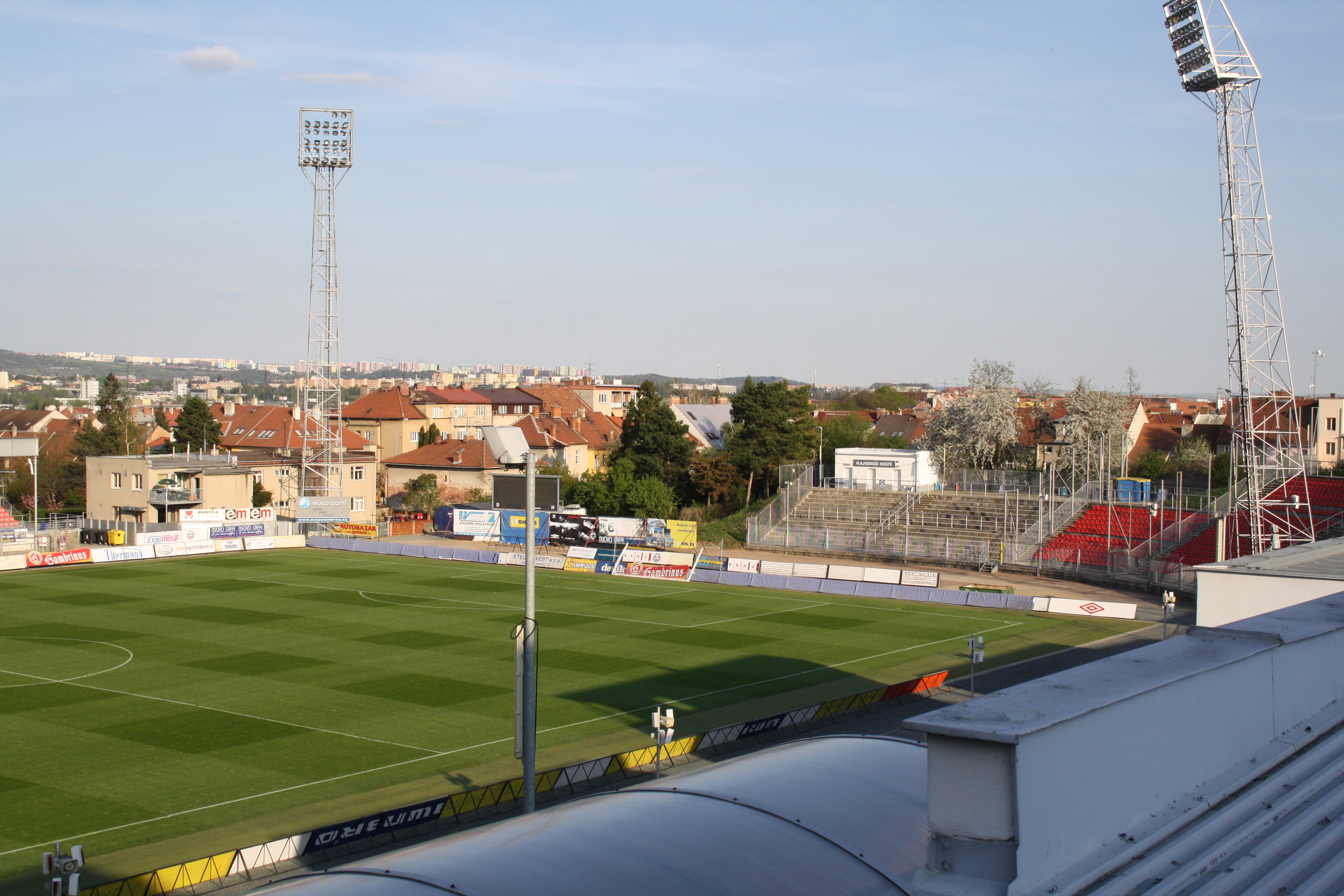
- Interactive map of Městský fotbalový stadion Srbská
- Former names: Městský fotbalový stadion Srbská (2001–2020); WEDOS Arena (2020–2021); ADAX INVEST Arena (2022–2024); ShipEx Arena (2025–present)
- Location: Srbská 47a, Brno, Czech Republic, 612 00
- Coordinates: 49°13′38″N 16°35′11″E
- Owner: City of Brno
- Operator: FC Zbrojovka Brno
- Capacity: 10,600
- Surface: Grass
- Field size: 105 by 68 metres (114.8 yd × 74.4 yd)
- Public transit: Srbská (32) at Červinkova (10, 12) at Semilasso (1, 6) at Semilasso (41, 44, 70, 72, 84) at Semilasso (30)

Construction
- Opened: 1926
- Renovated: 2001
- Cost: 110 million CZK (reconstruction)

Tenants
- Zbrojovka Brno (2001–present); Znojmo (2013–2014); Opava (2018) (selected matches); SK Artis Brno (2025–present)

Městský fotbalový stadion Srbská (transl. Srbská [street] Municipal Football Stadium), known as the ShipEx Arena for sponsorship purposes since 2025, is a football stadium in Brno, Czech Republic. Built in 1926, the stadium holds 10,600 people. It has been the home ground of FC Zbrojovka Brno since 2001, when the club moved from their previous home, Stadion Za Lužánkami.
