= Jakub Klíma =

Czech footballer (born 1998)

Personal information
- Date of birth: 28 August 1998 (age 28)
- Place of birth: Nymburk, Czech Republic
- Height: 1.85 m (6 ft 1 in)
- Position: Centre-back

Team information
- Current team: Zbrojovka Brno
- Number: 39

Youth career
- 2009–2017: Mladá Boleslav

Senior career*
| Years | Team | Apps | (Gls) |
| 2018–2022 | Mladá Boleslav | 61 | (0) |
| 2018 | → Pardubice (loan) | 15 | (0) |
| 2021–2022 | → Hradec Králové (loan) | 28 | (0) |
| 2022–2025 | Hradec Králové | 94 | (1) |
| 2025– | Zbrojovka Brno | 29 | (2) |

International career
| 2018 | Czech Republic U20 | 2 | (0) |
| 2020 | Czech Republic U21 | 1 | (0) |
- * Club domestic league appearances and goals as of 28 May 2026

Jakub Klíma (born 28 August 1998) is a Czech professional footballer who plays as a defender for Zbrojovka Brno.

== Life ==
Jakub Klíma was born in Nymburk, but he comes from the nearby village of Zvěřínek.

== Club career ==
Klíma was raised in the youth teams of FK Mladá Boleslav and here he also made his debut in senior football. He made his Czech First League debut on 17 February 2018, at the age of 19, in their 0–1 home loss against MFK Karviná.

In the autumn part of the 2018–19 season, he went on loan to FK Pardubice, playing in the Czech National Football League at that time. Before the 2020–21 season, he went on loan to FC Hradec Králové, a newcomer in the Czech First League. After the season, he transferred there permanently. He became a stable member of the starting lineup and was the player with the highest number of minutes played on the team in the 2022–23 and 2023–24 seasons. He has played over 110 matches for Hradec Králové and is among the most notable players in the club's first league history.

On 30 March 2023, in his 175th Czech First League match (home match against SK Dynamo České Budějovice), Klíma scored his first goal in senior football.

On 5 June 2025, Klíma signed a contract with FC Zbrojovka Brno.

== International career ==
Klíma played for the and U20 and U21 Czech Republic national teams.
