= Jakub Selnar =

Czech footballer (born 2000)

Personal information
- Date of birth: 13 April 2000 (age 26)
- Place of birth: Czech Republic
- Height: 1.81 m (5 ft 11 in)
- Position: Right winger

Team information
- Current team: Zbrojovka Brno
- Number: 10

Youth career
- Viktoria Plzeň

Senior career*
Years	Team	Apps	(Gls)
2019–2021	Viktoria Plzeň	0	(0)
2019	→ Baník Sokolov (loan)	15	(2)
2020	→ Pardubice (loan)	1	(0)
2021	→ Vysočina Jihlava (loan)	12	(2)
2021–2025	Vysočina Jihlava	111	(23)
2025–	Zbrojovka Brno	23	(1)

International career
2019	Czech Republic U19	4	(1)
2019	Czech Republic U20	3	(0)
- * Club domestic league appearances and goals as of 28 May 2026

Jakub Selnar (born 13 April 2000) is a Czech professional footballer who plays as a right winger for Czech National Football League club Zbrojovka Brno.

== Club career ==
Selnar is a product of Viktoria Plzeň. A profile on the clubs reserve, Selnar was called up for his first professional game on 26 May 2019 - a game against Baník Ostrava. However, he didn't get any playing time in that game. To gain some experience, Selnar was loaned out to Baník Sokolov in the summer 2019, until the end of the year. After returning from the loan spell, Selnar began training with Viktoria Plzeň's first team in January 2020. However, a few days later, he was loaned out to FK Pardubice. He played in only one match, before returning to Plzeň again in the spring.

In January 2021, Selnar was loaned out again, this time to FC Vysočina Jihlava until the end of July 2021, with a purchase option. On 19 July 2021, the club confirmed that they had triggered the purchase option and signed Selnar permanently.
