= Adam Hrdina =

Slovak youth international footballer

Personal information
- Full name: Adam Hrdina
- Date of birth: 12 February 2004 (age 22)
- Place of birth: Nová Baňa, Slovakia
- Height: 1.94 m (6 ft 4 in)
- Position: Goalkeeper

Team information
- Current team: Zbrojovka Brno
- Number: 1

Youth career
- 2011–2019: Nitra
- 2019–2021: Slovan Bratislava

Senior career*
Years	Team	Apps	(Gls)
2021–2025	Slovan Bratislava	4	(0)
2021–2025	Slovan Bratislava B	50	(0)
2025–	Zbrojovka Brno	43	(0)

International career
2019	Slovakia U16	1	(0)
2021–2022	Slovakia U19	3	(0)
2022–2023	Slovakia U20	4	(0)
- * Club domestic league appearances and goals as of 27 May 2026

Adam Hrdina (born 12 February 2004) is a Slovak footballer who plays for Zbrojovka Brno as a goalkeeper.

== Club career ==
=== Slovan Bratislava ===
Hrdina made his competitive debut for Slovan Bratislava at the age of 18, keeping a clean sheet in a Slovak Cup match against FC ViOn Zlaté Moravce, which his side won 2–0 in March 2022. He made his Fortuna Liga debut for Slovan Bratislava against Orion Tip Sereď on 14 May 2022. He kept a clean sheet in the match. He made four senior league appearances for Slovan during his time with the club, regularly playing for their B-team in 2024.

=== Zbrojovka Brno ===
On 23 January 2025, Hrdina signed a multi-year contract with Czech National Football League club Zbrojovka Brno. He was in goal for 13 matches of Brno's 14 match undefeated league streak in 2025.

== Honours ==
Slovan Bratislava

- Niké Liga (2): 2021–22, 2022–23
