= Tomáš Břečka =

Czech footballer (born 1994)

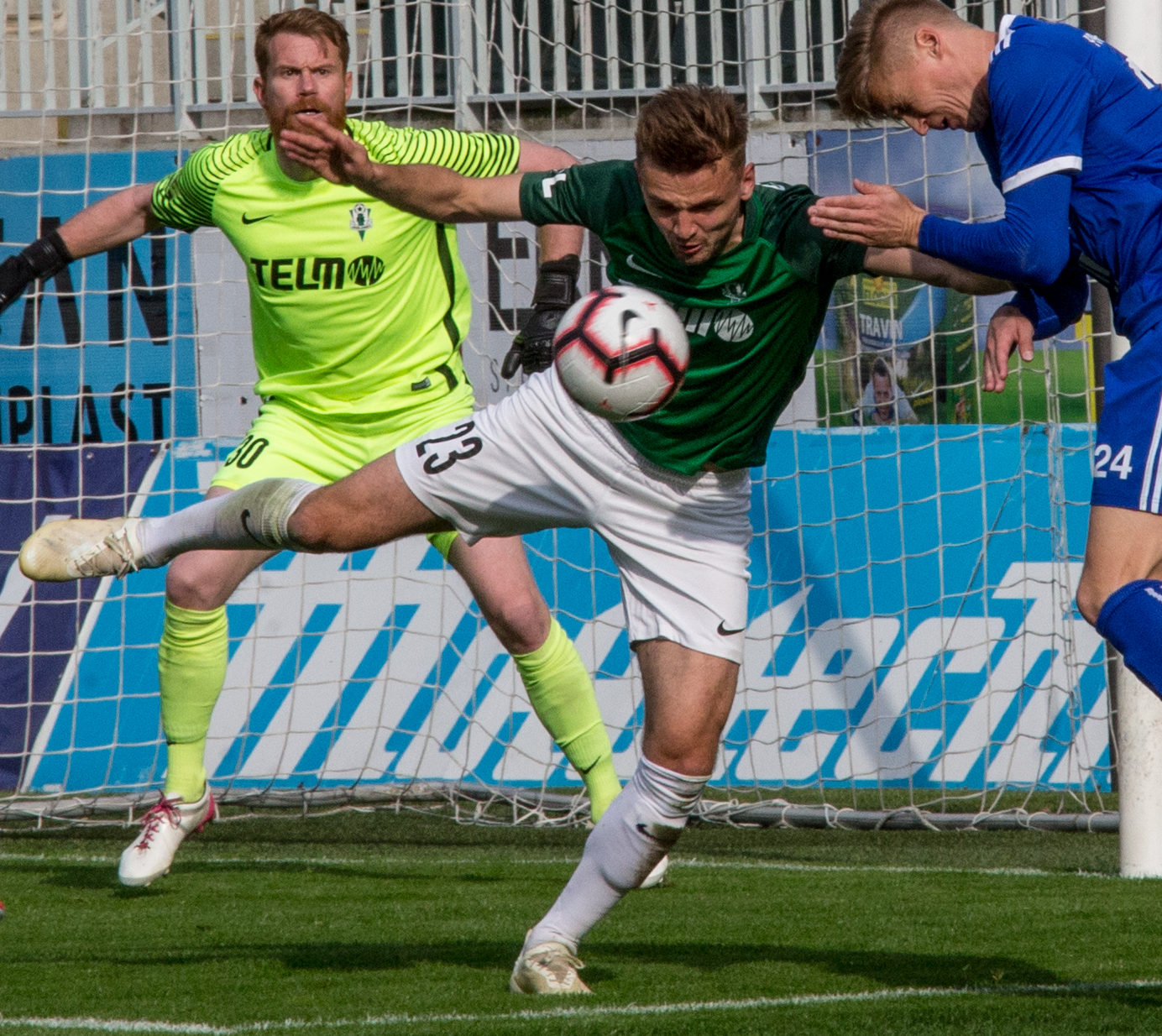

Personal information
- Date of birth: 12 May 1994 (age 32)
- Place of birth: Kroměříž, Czech Republic
- Height: 1.85 m (6 ft 1 in)
- Position: Centre back

Team information
- Current team: Zbrojovka Brno
- Number: 25

Youth career
- Slovácko

Senior career*
Years	Team	Apps	(Gls)
2013–2018	Slovácko	58	(1)
2018–2019	Jablonec	40	(2)
2020–2022	Kasımpaşa	60	(1)
2022–2025	Slovácko	15	(0)
2025–	Zbrojovka Brno	19	(1)

International career
2015	Czech Republic U21	1	(0)
- * Club domestic league appearances and goals as of 28 May 2026

Tomáš Břečka (born 12 May 1994) is a Czech professional footballer who plays as a centre back for Zbrojovka Brno.

== Club career ==
He made his senior league debut for Slovácko on 31 May 2014, in a Czech First League 0–2 home loss against Teplice. He scored his first league goal on 29 November 2014, in a Czech First League 2–1 away win at Bohemians 1905.

On 2 September 2022, Břečka returned to Slovácko with a three-year contract.

On 30 January 2025, Břečka signed a multi-year contract with Zbrojovka Brno.
