= Adam Kronus =

Czech footballer

Personal information
- Date of birth: 29 July 2002 (age 24)
- Place of birth: Kladno, Czech Republic
- Height: 1.80 m (5 ft 11 in)
- Position: Winger

Team information
- Current team: Karviná

Youth career
- 2008−2018: Kladno
- 2018−2022: Viktoria Plzeň

Senior career*
Years	Team	Apps	(Gls)
2022−2024	Viktoria Plzeň	1	(0)
2023	→ Táborsko (loan)	14	(3)
2023−2024	→ Zbrojovka Brno (loan)	17	(1)
2024−2026	Zbrojovka Brno	40	(9)
2026−	Karviná	0	(0)

International career^{‡}
2021	Czech Republic U20	1	(0)
- * Club domestic league appearances and goals as of 28 May 2026 ‡ National team caps and goals as of 16 August 2023

Adam Kronus (born 29 July 2002) is a Czech footballer who currently plays as a winger for Czech National Football League club Karviná.

== Career ==
He made his senior league debut for Viktoria Plzeň on 29 October 2022 in a Czech First League 3–0 win at Zlín. On 1 November 2022 he started the UEFA Champions League home match against Barcelona, where he replaced Václav Pilař in the 88th minute. The match ended in a loss 0–2.

On 2 July 2026, Kronus signed a multi-year contract with Czech National Football League club Karviná.
