= Jakub Janetzký =

Czech footballer (born 1997)

Personal information
- Date of birth: 12 June 1997 (age 29)
- Place of birth: Opava, Czech Republic
- Height: 1.82 m (6 ft 0 in)
- Position: Attacking midfielder

Team information
- Current team: Zbrojovka Brno
- Number: 68

Youth career
- 2008–2014: Opava

Senior career*
Years	Team	Apps	(Gls)
2015–2016	Opava	38	(4)
2017–2019	Jablonec	3	(0)
2017	→ Opava (loan)	12	(1)
2018–2019	→ Opava (loan)	38	(4)
2019–2024	Zlín	140	(12)
2024–	Zbrojovka Brno	63	(7)

International career
2012–2013	Czech Republic U16	6	(0)
2015	Czech Republic U18	1	(0)
2016	Czech Republic U19	2	(0)
2016–2017	Czech Republic U20	6	(0)
- * Club domestic league appearances and goals as of 16 September 2026

Jakub Janetzký (born 12 June 1997) is a Czech professional footballer who plays as an attacking midfielder for Zbrojovka Brno.

== Biography ==
Janetzký was born in Opava.

== Club career ==
Janetzký played in the junior teams of SFC Opava. He made his debut in the Czech National Football League for Opava in February 2015, at the age of 17, and immediately started playing regularly in the starting line-up. In 2017, he transferred to FK Jablonec, but he remained in Opava on loan for half a year. He made his Czech First League debut for Jablonec on 29 July 2017 in their 1–1 away draw against Slovácko. After half a year, he returned to Opava again on loan.

Before the 2019–20 season, he transferred to FC Zlín. Since then, he has played regularly for Zlín. As of September 2023, he has played 119 league matches for Zlín, which is the 10th highest in the club's first league history.

In June 2024 Janetzký signed a contract with Czech National Football League club Zbrojovka Brno.

== International career ==
Janetzký played for the U16–U20 Czech Republic youth national teams.
