= Filip Vedral =

Czech footballer (born 1997)

Personal information
- Date of birth: 26 April 1997 (age 29)
- Place of birth: Jihlava, Czech Republic
- Height: 1.93 m (6 ft 4 in)
- Position: Centre-back

Team information
- Current team: Zbrojovka Brno
- Number: 26

Youth career
- –2018: Vysočina Jihlava

Senior career*
Years	Team	Apps	(Gls)
2018–2024	Vysočina Jihlava	129	(19)
2017	→ HFK Olomouc (loan)	14	(0)
2019–2020	→ Vlašim (loan)	10	(1)
2024–2025	Vyškov	30	(1)
2025–	Zbrojovka Brno	25	(0)
- * Club domestic league appearances and goals as of 28 May 2026

Filip Vedral (born 26 April 1997) is a Czech professional footballer who plays as a centre-back for Zbrojovka Brno.

== Career ==
=== Vysočina Jihlava ===
Vedral came through the youth ranks of Vysočina Jihlava and made his senior debut with the club. Between 2017 and 2020, he had loan spells at HFK Olomouc, Slavoj Polná and FC Sellier & Bellot Vlašim. He played over 130 matches and scored 20 goals in the Czech National Football League, and extended his contract in 2021. He was also occasionally used as a striker.

=== Vyškov ===
In July 2024, Vedral joined MFK Vyškov on a permanent deal. He featured in 28 league matches, scored once and provided two assists, playing a key role in the promotion play-offs. He also captained the team in several matches.

=== FC Zbrojovka Brno ===
In mid‑June 2025, Vedral was announced as a new signing for Zbrojovka Brno on a multi-year deal.

== Style of play ==
Vedral is noted for his physical presence and aerial ability, often deployed when needed in central defense or as a forward. He is also commended for his leadership qualities, having captained both Vysočina and Vyškov.
