= Patrik Žitný =

Czech footballer

Personal information
- Date of birth: 21 January 1999 (age 27)
- Place of birth: Ústí nad Labem, Czech Republic
- Height: 1.77 m (5 ft 10 in)
- Position: Midfielder

Team information
- Current team: Zbrojovka Brno
- Number: 29

Youth career
- Teplice

Senior career*
Years	Team	Apps	(Gls)
2017–2022	Teplice	101	(13)
2022–2025	Mladá Boleslav	28	(0)
2022–2025	→→ Mladá Boleslav B	19	(6)
2025–	Zbrojovka Brno	37	(7)

International career
2014–2015	Czech Republic U16	7	(0)
2016–2017	Czech Republic U18	11	(3)
2017–2018	Czech Republic U19	12	(2)
2018	Czech Republic U20	5	(2)
2019–	Czech Republic U21	11	(2)
- * Club domestic league appearances and goals as of 28 May 2026

Patrik Žitný (born 21 January 1999) is a Czech football player who plays for Zbrojovka Brno.

== Club career ==
He made his Czech First League debut for Teplice on 17 February 2018 in a game against Jablonec.
