= Patrik Čavoš =

Czech footballer (born 1996)

Personal information
- Full name: Patrik Čavoš
- Date of birth: October 7, 1996 (age 30)
- Place of birth: Prague, Czech Republic
- Height: 1.80 m (5 ft 11 in)
- Position: Midfielder

Team information
- Current team: Zbrojovka Brno
- Number: 8

Youth career
- 2001–2014: Sparta Prague

Senior career*
Years	Team	Apps	(Gls)
2014–2017	Sparta Prague	0	(0)
2015	→ Kolín (loan)	9	(0)
2016–2017	→ České Budějovice (loan)	42	(2)
2017–2023	České Budějovice	165	(11)
2023–2025	Karviná	55	(4)
2025–	Zbrojovka Brno	22	(4)
- * Club domestic league appearances and goals as of 29 July 2025

Patrik Čavoš (born 7 October 1996) is a Czech professional footballer who plays as a midfielder for Zbrojovka Brno in the Czech National Football League.
