= Jan Juroška =

Czech footballer (born 1993)

Personal information
- Date of birth: 2 March 1993 (age 33)
- Place of birth: Valašské Meziříčí, Czech Republic
- Height: 1.79 m (5 ft 10 in)
- Position: Midfielder

Team information
- Current team: Zbrojovka Brno
- Number: 32

Youth career
- Dukla Prague

Senior career*
Years	Team	Apps	(Gls)
2014–2017	Dukla Prague	33	(2)
2015	→ Varnsdorf (loan)	11	(1)
2016	→ Táborsko (loan)	10	(0)
2017–2020	Slovácko	73	(2)
2020–2025	Baník Ostrava	75	(2)
2025–	Zbrojovka Brno	28	(2)
- * Club domestic league appearances and goals as of 28 May 2026

Jan Juroška (born 2 March 1993) is a Czech professional footballer who plays for Zbrojovka Brno.

== Career ==
He scored on his Czech First League debut for the Dukla Prague, a 3–2 loss to Bohemians 1905, after joining the game as a second-half substitute in May 2014. In May 2017 he signed a three-year contract with Dukla's First League rivals, 1. FC Slovácko.

On 28 May 2025, Juroška signed a contract with Zbrojovka Brno as a free agent.

== Career statistics ==
As of 31 July 2020

Club	Season	League		Cup		Total	
Club	Season	Apps	Goals	Apps	Goals	Apps	Goals
Dukla Prague	2013–14	3	1	0	0	3	1
Dukla Prague	2014–15	8	0	1	0	9	0
Dukla Prague	2015–16	0	0	0	0	0	0
Dukla Prague	2016–17	22	0	3	0	25	0
Total		33	1	4	0	37	1
Varnsdorf (loan)	2015–16	11	1	0	0	11	1
Táborsko (loan)	2015–16	10	0	0	0	10	0
Slovácko	2017–18	23	1	0	0	23	1
Slovácko	2018–19	32	0	0	0	32	0
Slovácko	2019–20	18	1	0	0	18	1
Career total		127	4	4	0	131	4
