= FC Zbrojovka Brno =

Association football club in the Czech Republic

- Full name: Football Club Zbrojovka Brno a.s.
- Nicknames: Flinta (The Gun); Zbrojováci (The Gunsmiths); Jihomoravané (South Moravians)
- Founded: 1913; 113 years ago (as SK Židenice)
- Ground: ShipEx Arena
- Capacity: 10,600
- Chairman: Jan Mynář
- Manager: Martin Svědík
- League: Czech First League
- 2025–26: Czech National Football League, 1st of 16 (promoted)
- Website: www.fczbrno.cz
Home colours	Away colours	Third colours

FC Zbrojovka Brno is a professional football club based in the city of Brno, South Moravian Region, Czech Republic and named after Zbrojovka Brno, a firearms manufacturer. Founded in 1913 as SK Židenice, the club later became known as Zbrojovka Brno. Brno won the Czechoslovak First League in the 1977–78 season and finished as runners-up in 1979–80.

== History ==
Club logo for the 2023–24 season

The club, initially known as SK Židenice, played in the top tier of Czechoslovak football from 1933 until being expelled after the 1946–47 Czechoslovak First League. During this period, the club entered the Mitropa Cup three times, reaching the quarter-finals in 1935 as well as taking part in the competition in 1936 and 1938.

Between 1950 and 1962 the club played outside the top tier, returning in the 1962–63 Czechoslovak First League. Five seasons elapsed before the club was again relegated, in 1967. They then spent four years in the second tier of Czechoslovak football before returning to the top flight. In the 1970s the club was a strong force in the country, winning the Czechoslovak First League in 1978, finishing third the following season and being runners up in 1980.

The 1980s were less spectacular for Brno, as the club was relegated in 1983, playing until 1989 in the second tier. After just two seasons in the top tier, the club finished last in 1991 and was again relegated.

Between 1992 and 2011, Brno played in the top tier of the Czech Republic for 19 consecutive seasons, the longest such spell in the club's history. In 2011, the club was relegated to the second division. In the 2011–12 Czech 2. Liga, the club only managed to finish fourth, missing out on the promotion places. However, due to the stadium requirements of the Czech First League, champions FK Ústí nad Labem as well as third-placed FK Baník Sokolov were ineligible for promotion. As a result, Brno won promotion immediately back to the top tier. In 2018, the club was relegated to the second division. In the 2018–19 Czech Second League, the club managed to finish third but lost the promotion play-off to Příbram.

=== Historical names ===
- SK Židenice / Sportovní klub (Sports club) Židenice (1913–47)
- SK Zbrojovka Židenice Brno / Sportovní klub (Sports club) Zbrojovka Židenice Brno (1947–48)
- JTO Sokol Zbrojovka Židenice Brno / Jednotná tělovýchovná organizace (Unified physical education organization) Sokol Zbrojovka Židenice Brno (1948–51)
- JTO Sokol Zbrojovka Brno / Jednotná tělovýchovná organizace (Unified physical education organization) Sokol Zbrojovka Brno (1951–53)
- DSO Spartak Zbrojovka Brno / Dobrovolná sportovní organizace (Voluntary sports organization) Spartak Zbrojovka Brno (1953–56)
- TJ Spartak ZJŠ Brno / Tělovýchovná jednota (Physical education unity) Spartak Závody Jana Švermy Brno (1956–68)
- TJ Zbrojovka Brno / Tělovýchovná jednota (Physical education unity) Zbrojovka Brno (1968–90)
- FC Zbrojovka Brno / Football Club Zbrojovka Brno (1990–92)
- FC Boby Brno / Football Club Boby Brno (1992–94)
- FC Boby Brno Unistav / Football Club Boby Brno Unistav (1994–97)
- FC Boby-sport Brno / Football Club Boby-sport Brno (1997–2000)
- FC Stavo Artikel Brno / Football Club Stavo Artikel Brno (2000–02)
- 1. FC Brno / First Football Club Brno (2002–10)
- FC Zbrojovka Brno / Football Club Zbrojovka Brno (2010– )

In 1962, there was an amalgamation between Rudá Hvězda Brno (1956–62) and Spartak ZJŠ Brno.

=== European competitions ===
Brno (then SK Židenice) competed in the Mitropa Cup three times before World War II, reaching the quarter-finals in 1935.

Because Brno was a major fairs city of Czechoslovakia, teams from Brno played in the Inter-Cities Fairs Cup in the 1960s. It was Spartak KPS Brno who participated first, then Spartak ZJŠ Brno (Zbrojovka) played five times in the Inter-Cities Fairs Cup in a row, reaching the quarter-finals in 1963–64.

In their only appearance to date in the competition, Brno reached the second round of the 1978–79 European Cup. The club played in the 1993–94 European Cup Winners' Cup but lost in the first round. Brno took part in the UEFA Cup three times, reaching the quarter-finals in 1979–80 and also playing in 1980–81 and 1997–98.

== Stadium ==
Brno have played at ShipEx Aréna since 2001, when they moved from previous home Stadion Za Lužánkami. In the 1990s, Brno attracted record crowds to their football matches, with Za Lužánkami as the venue for all of the top ten most-attended Czech First League matches. The highest attendance for a Brno match is 44,120, set in a league match against Slavia Prague.

== Players ==
=== Current squad ===
As of 8 September 2026.

Note: Flags indicate national team as defined under FIFA eligibility rules; some limited exceptions apply. Players may hold more than one non-FIFA nationality.

No.	Pos.	Nation	Player
1	GK	SVK	Adam Hrdina
3	DF	BRA	Kaká
4	DF	CZE	Eric Hunal
6	MF	CZE	Lukáš Penxa
7	MF	CZE	Štěpán Langer
8	MF	CZE	Patrik Čavoš
9	FW	CZE	Oliver Velich
10	MF	CZE	Antonín Vaníček
11	MF	SVK	Martin Rymarenko
14	MF	CZE	Tadeáš Vachoušek (on loan from Teplice)
15	FW	CZE	Daniel Vašulín
17	MF	CZE	Jaromír Zmrhal
18	DF	CZE	Denis Granečný
19	FW	BDI	Bienvenue Kanakimana
20	MF	CZE	Lukas Saal

No.	Pos.	Nation	Player
21	FW	CZE	Filip Večeřa
23	MF	CZE	Petr Ševčík
24	GK	CZE	Dominik Sváček
25	DF	CZE	Tomáš Břečka
26	DF	CZE	Filip Vedral
29	MF	CZE	Patrik Žitný
30	GK	CZE	Colin Andrew
32	DF	CZE	Jan Juroška
38	DF	CZE	Jakub Pokorný
39	DF	CZE	Jakub Klíma
44	DF	MLI	Amadou Dante
68	MF	CZE	Jakub Janetzký
77	FW	NGR	Lucky Ezeh
78	GK	CZE	Ondřej Prodělal
79	MF	NGR	Afolabi Soliu (on loan from Slovan Liberec)

=== Out on loan ===
Note: Flags indicate national team as defined under FIFA eligibility rules; some limited exceptions apply. Players may hold more than one non-FIFA nationality.

No.	Pos.	Nation	Player
—	DF	CZE	Zdeněk Toman (at Kroměříž)
—	MF	CZE	David Polášek (at Kroměříž)
—	MF	CZE	Daniel Polák (at Kroměříž)
—	DF	SRB	Alex Marković (at Karviná)

No.	Pos.	Nation	Player
—	FW	CZE	Martin Černý (at Třinec)
—	MF	MKD	Martin Gjorgievski (at Dukla Banská Bystrica)
—	DF	CZE	Daniel Kutík (at Zlaté Moravce)
—	FW	TTO	Justin Araujo-Wilson (at Atlético Ottawa)

=== Reserves ===
As of 2026–27, the club's reserve team FC Zbrojovka Brno B plays in the Moravian-Silesian Football League (3rd tier of Czech football system). The reserve team played in three consecutive seasons of the Czech National Football League (2003–04, 2004–05 and 2005–06).

=== Notable former players ===
- Oldřich Rulc
- Vlastimil Bubník
- Karel Lichtnégl
- Ján Popluhár
- Rostislav Václavíček
- Karel Kroupa
- Karel Jarůšek
- Petr Janečka
- Roman Kukleta
- René Wagner
- Richard Dostálek
- Jan Maroši
- Milan Pacanda

Some of the biggest Czech football legends played for Brno briefly:

- Karel Pešek (at the end of career)
- Josef Bican (at the end of career, as playing manager)
- Ivo Viktor (at the beginning of career)

== Player records in the Czech First League ==
As of 18 September 2026

Highlighted players are in the current squad.

=== Most appearances ===
#	Name	Matches
1	(Czech Republic) Petr Křivánek	300
2	(Czech Republic) Patrik Siegl	267
3	(Czech Republic) Marek Zúbek	261
4	(Czech Republic) Luboš Přibyl	224
5	(Czech Republic) Milan Pacanda	188
6	(Czech Republic) Richard Dostálek	174
7	(Czech Republic) Jan Maroši	167
8	(Czech Republic) Pavel Holomek	166
9	(Czech Republic) Zdeněk Valnoha	162
10	(Czech Republic) Jan Trousil	158

=== Most goals ===
#	Name	Goals
1	(Czech Republic) Milan Pacanda	53
2	(Czech Republic) Richard Dostálek	40
3	(Czech Republic) Jakub Řezníček	39
4	(Czech Republic) René Wagner	34
4	(Czech Republic) Pavel Holomek	34
6	(Czech Republic) Petr Švancara	30
7	(Czech Republic) Libor Došek	29
8	(Czech Republic) Michal Škoda	26
9	(Czech Republic) Zdeněk Valnoha	25
9	(Czech Republic) Luděk Zelenka	25

=== Most clean sheets ===
#	Name	Clean sheets
1	(Czech Republic) Luboš Přibyl	70
2	(Czech Republic) Dušan Melichárek	30
3	(Czech Republic) Martin Lejsal	27

== Current technical staff ==
As of 23 September 2026

Position	Name
Manager	(Czech Republic) Martin Svědík
Assistant manager	(Czech Republic) Bronislav Červenka (Czech Republic) Jan Baránek Jr. (Czech Republic) Pavel Zavadil
Goalkeeping coach	(Czech Republic) Tomáš Čechovič

== Managers ==
- Václav Vohralík (1926–1934)
- Jenö Konrád (1934–1935)
- Antonín Carvan (1935–1937)
- Kálmán Konrád (1937−1938)
- Josef Kuchynka (1939–1941)
- Vlastimil Borecký (1941–1942)
- Josef Smolka (1942–1943)
- Josef Eremiáš (1943–1946)
- Matthias Kaburek (1947)
- Josef Eremiáš (1947–1948)
- Jan Smolka (1948–1949)
- Josef Košťálek (1950)
- Josef Eremiáš (1951–1952)
- Eduard Farda (1953–1957)
- Josef Bican (1957)
- Josef Machata (1958)
- František Čejka (1958–1959)
- Svatoslav Vrbka (1960)
- František Zapletal (1960–1962)
- Rudolf Krčil (1962)
- Alfréd Sezemský (1963)
- František Zapletal (1964)
- Karel Kolský (1964–1966)
- Karel Nepala (1966–1967)
- František Čejka (1967)
- Josef Jaroš (1967)
- Karel Kohlík (1967)
- Vratislav Dittrich (1967–1968)
- Theodor Reimann (1968–1969)
- Zdeněk Hajský (1969–1971)
- Alfréd Sezemský (1972)
- František Havránek (1972–1976)
- Josef Masopust (1976–1980)
- Valér Švec (1980–1981)
- Karel Brückner (1981–1983)
- Josef Bouška (1983)
- Viliam Padúch (1984)
- Ján Zachar (1984–1985)
- Ivan Hrdlička (1985–1987)
- Rudolf Skarka (1987)
- Petr Pálka (1987–1988)
- František Harašta (1988)
- František Cipro (1989–1990)
- Viliam Padúch (1990)
- Karol Dobiaš (1990–1993)
- Josef Masopust (1993)
- Vladimír Táborský (1993–1994)
- Karel Večeřa (1994)
- Petr Uličný (1994–1996)
- Karel Večeřa (1996–1998)
- Karel Jarůšek (1998–2000)
- Pavel Tobiáš (2000–2001)
- Karel Večeřa (2001–2003)
- Karel Jarůšek (2004–2005)
- Jiří Kotrba (2005)
- Josef Mazura (2005–2007)
- Petr Uličný (2007–2008)
- Aleš Křeček (2008)
- Miroslav Beránek (2008–2010)
- Karel Večeřa (Jul 2010 – Jun 2011)
- René Wagner (Jul 2011 – Oct 2011)
- Róbert Kafka (Oct 2011 – Dec 2011)
- Petr Čuhel (Jan 2012 – Apr 2013)
- Ludevít Grmela (Apr 2013 – Sep 2013)
- Václav Kotal (Sep 2013 – Jun 2016)
- Svatopluk Habanec (Jun 2016 – Aug 2017)
- Richard Dostálek (Aug 2017 – Oct 2017)
- Roman Pivarník (Oct 2017 – Aug 2018)
- Pavel Šustr (Aug 2018 – Oct 2019)
- Miloslav Machálek (Oct 2019 – Dec 2020)
- Richard Dostálek (Dec 2020 – Apr 2023)
- Martin Hašek (Apr 2023 – May 2023)
- Luděk Klusáček (Jun 2023 – Oct 2023)
- Tomáš Polách (Oct 2023 – Apr 2024)
- Lukáš Kříž (Apr 2024 – June 2024)
- Jaroslav Hynek (June 2024 – March 2025)
- Marek Zúbek (March 2025 – April 2025)
- Martin Svědík (April 2025 – present)

== History in domestic competitions ==
- 1971–83: Czechoslovak First League
- 1983–89: Czech National League
- 1989–91: Czechoslovak First League
- 1991–92: Czech National League
- 1992–93: Czechoslovak First League
- 1993–11: Czech First League
- 2011–12: Czech National Football League
- 2012–18: Czech First League
- 2018–20: Czech National Football League
- 2020–21: Czech First League
- 2021–22: Czech National Football League
- 2022–23: Czech First League
- 2023–26: Czech National Football League
- 2026-present: Czech First League

- Seasons spent at Level 1 of the football league system: 26
- Seasons spent at Level 2 of the football league system: 6
- Seasons spent at Level 3 of the football league system: 0
- Seasons spent at Level 4 of the football league system: 0

=== Czech Republic ===
Season	League	Placed	Pld	W	D	L	GF	GA	GD	Pts	Cup
1993–94	1. liga	12th	30	10	6	14	38	46	–8	36	Quarter-finals
1994–95	1. liga	3rd	30	15	9	6	52	27	+25	54	Round of 32
1995–96	1. liga	8th	30	12	7	11	39	42	–3	43	Round of 64
1996–97	1. liga	4th	30	14	10	6	44	35	+9	52	Quarter-finals
1997–98	1. liga	10th	30	10	7	13	42	42	0	37	Semi-finals
1998–99	1. liga	7th	30	11	8	11	37	33	+4	41	Quarter-finals
1999–00	1. liga	4th	30	12	6	12	3	33	+2	42	Round of 16
2000–01	1. liga	13th	30	7	9	14	24	35	–11	30	Round of 16
2001–02	1. liga	8th	30	10	10	10	34	42	–8	40	Round of 16
2002–03	1. liga	9th	30	10	9	11	35	31	+4	39	Round of 16
2003–04	1. liga	14th	30	7	9	14	33	43	–10	30	Quarter-finals
2004–05	1. liga	11th	30	9	6	15	30	42	–12	33	Round of 32
2005–06	1. liga	12th	30	7	14	9	35	36	–1	35	Semi-finals
2006–07	1. liga	5th	30	13	7	10	34	42	–8	46	Second round
2007–08	1. liga	4th	30	16	7	7	43	32	+11	55	Semi-finals
2008–09	1. liga	11th	30	9	8	13	32	36	–4	35	Round of 32
2009–10	1. liga	11th	30	9	8	13	31	40	–9	35	Round of 32
2010–11	1. liga	15th	30	7	3	20	33	55	–22	24	Quarter-finals
2011–12	2. liga	4th	30	13	10	7	37	29	+8	49	Round of 32
2012–13	1. liga	13th	30	9	5	16	34	53	–19	32	Second round
2013–14	1. liga	9th	30	10	7	13	32	42	–10	37	Semi-finals
2014–15	1. liga	14th	30	9	6	15	34	45	–11	33	Round of 32
2015–16	1. liga	6th	30	14	5	11	37	38	-1	47	Round of 16
2016–17	1. liga	11th	30	6	14	10	32	45	-13	32	Quarter-finals
2017–18	1. liga	16th	30	6	6	18	20	43	–23	24	Round of 64
2018–19	2. liga	3rd	30	17	6	7	63	31	+32	57	Round of 32
2019–20	2. liga	2nd	30	20	7	3	75	29	+46	67	Round of 32
2020–21	1. liga	16th	34	5	11	18	33	57	–24	26	Round of 16
2021–22	2. liga	1st	30	22	3	5	61	29	+32	69	Round of 32
2022–23	1. liga	16th	35	8	9	18	41	64	–23	33	Quarter-finals
2023–24	2. liga	9th	30	11	6	13	41	42	–1	39	Round of 32
2024–25	2. liga	7th	30	9	12	9	39	41	–2	39	Round of 32
2025–26	2. liga	1st	30	24	4	2	62	22	+40	76	Round of 16
2026–27	1. liga										Round of 16

== Honours ==
- Czechoslovak First League
  - Winners (1): 1977–78
  - Runners-up (1): 1979–80
- Czech First League
  - Third place (1): 1994–95
- Czech Second League
  - Winners (2): 2021–22, 2025–26
  - Runners-up (1): 2019–20
- Czechoslovak Amateur League
  - Winners (1): 1926
- Czechoslovak Cup
  - Winners (1): 1959–60 (as Rudá Hvězda)
- Czech Cup
  - Runners-up (1): 1992–93

== Club records ==
=== Czech First League records ===
- Best position: 3rd (1994–95)
- Worst position: 16th (2017–18, 2022–23)
- Biggest home win: Brno 7–0 Slovácko (2010–11)
- Biggest away win: Olomouc 0–3 Brno (1993–94), Teplice 1–4 Brno (2017–18)
- Biggest home defeat: Brno 0–5 Sparta Prague (2010–11)
- Biggest away defeat: Slavia Prague 6–0 Brno (1993–94), Sparta Prague 6–0 Brno (2001–02)
