= Martin Svědík =

Czech footballer and manager

Personal information
- Full name: Martin Svědík
- Date of birth: 27 June 1974 (age 52)
- Place of birth: Czechoslovakia
- Position: Striker

Team information
- Current team: Zbrojovka Brno (manager)

Senior career*
Years	Team	Apps	(Gls)
1993–1994	Baník Ostrava	18	(3)
1995	Sigma Olomouc	11	(1)
1995-1996	FC Příbram	29	(6)
1996–1998	Lázně Bohdaneč	18	(10)

International career
1993–1994	Czech Republic U21	3	(1)

Managerial career
- 2007–2013: Pardubice
- 2013: Baník Ostrava
- 2013–2014: Baník Ostrava (assistant)
- 2014–2015: Dinamo Minsk (assistant)
- 2015–2016: Czech Republic U20
- 2015–2018: Czech Republic U21 (assistant)
- 2016–2017: Mladá Boleslav
- 2017: Mladá Boleslav (assistant)
- 2017–2018: Jihlava
- 2018–2024: Slovácko
- 2025–: Zbrojovka Brno
- * Club domestic league appearances and goals

Martin Svědík (born 27 June 1974) is a Czech football manager and former player.

== Playing career ==
As a player, Svědík played as a forward. He started playing at the top level in the 1993–94 Czech First League for FC Baník Ostrava before having brief spells in the top flight with SK Sigma MŽ Olomouc and AFK Atlantic Lázně Bohdaneč. He also played for the Czech Republic national under-21 football team between 1993 and 1994.

== Management career ==
Svědík took over at TJ Tesla Pardubice in 2007, while the club was in the Czech Fourth Division. Svědík led FK Pardubice, which had changed its name in 2010, to promotion from the Czech Fourth Division to the Bohemian Football League in 2010, with the club celebrating promotion five games before the end of the season. The club played in the Bohemian Football League for two seasons, before winning promotion to the Czech 2. Liga in 2012.

On 12 April 2025, Svědík was appointed manager Zbrojovka Brno, last team of the Czech 2. Liga at the moment.

== Honours ==
=== Managerial ===
FK Pardubice

- Bohemian Football League runner-up: 2011–12
- Czech Fourth Division: 2009–10

1. FC Slovácko

- Czech Cup: 2021–22

FC Zbrojovka Brno

- Czech National Football League: 2025–26
