= 2020–21 FC Zbrojovka Brno season =

FC Zbrojovka Brno
2020–21 season
- President: Václav Bartoněk
- Manager: Miloslav Machálek (until 15 December); Richard Dostálek (from 16 December)
- Stadium: Wedos Arena
- Czech First League: 16th (relegated)
- Czech Cup: Fourth round
- Top goalscorer: League: Antonín Růsek (7); All: Antonín Růsek (7)
- Highest home attendance: 4,187
- Lowest home attendance: 0
- Average home league attendance: 2,775
- Biggest win: 4–1 vs Opava
- Biggest defeat: 1–6 vs Sparta Prague
Home colours	Away colours

The 2020–21 FC Zbrojovka Brno season is the club's 25th season in the Czech First League. The team is competing in Czech First League and the Czech Cup.

== First team squad ==
As of 12 February 2021.

Note: Flags indicate national team as defined under FIFA eligibility rules; some limited exceptions apply. Players may hold more than one non-FIFA nationality.

No.	Pos.	Nation	Player
1	GK	CZE	Vojtěch Marek
4	DF	CZE	Jan Hlavica
5	MF	CZE	David Jambor
6	DF	CZE	Pavel Dreksa (captain)
7	MF	CZE	Rudolf Reiter (on loan from Baník Ostrava)
8	MF	CZE	Šimon Šumbera
10	FW	CZE	Antonín Růsek
11	MF	CZE	Adam Fousek
13	MF	CZE	Jiří Texl (on loan from Sigma Olomouc)
14	FW	CZE	Jakub Přichystal
15	DF	SRB	Zoran Gajić
16	MF	CZE	Jan Sedlák
17	DF	CZE	Jan Moravec
20	FW	CZE	Jan Hladík
21	MF	CZE	Ondřej Pachlopník

No.	Pos.	Nation	Player
23	DF	CZE	Jakub Šural
24	MF	SVK	Peter Štepanovský (vice-captain)
25	DF	CZE	Lukáš Kryštůfek
26	DF	SVK	Timotej Záhumenský
27	MF	SVK	Damián Bariš
29	MF	SVK	Adrián Čermák
35	FW	CZE	Daniel Fila
40	GK	CZE	Martin Šustr
44	DF	CZE	Luděk Pernica (on loan from Viktoria Plzeň)
53	GK	CZE	Martin Berkovec
59	GK	CZE	Jiří Floder
66	MF	CZE	Marek Vintr
90	MF	CZE	Ondřej Vaněk
—	DF	CZE	Lukáš Endl

=== Out on loan ===
As of 12 February 2021.

Note: Flags indicate national team as defined under FIFA eligibility rules; some limited exceptions apply. Players may hold more than one non-FIFA nationality.

No.	Pos.	Nation	Player
—	DF	CZE	Jakub Černín (at Blansko until 30 June 2021)
—	MF	CZE	Martin Sedlák (at Kroměříž until 30 June 2021)
—	MF	CZE	Michal Ševčík (at Jihlava until 30 June 2021)

No.	Pos.	Nation	Player
—	FW	CZE	Martin Zikl (at Líšeň until 30 June 2021)
—	FW	CZE	Claude Lhotecký (at Blansko until 30 June 2021)

== Transfers ==
=== In ===
Pos	Player	Transferred from	Fee	Window	Date	Source
DF	(Czech Republic) Jan Hlavica	(Czech Republic) Líšeň	Undisclosed	Summer	29 July 2020	
DF	(Czech Republic) Jakub Černín	(Czech Republic) Líšeň	Loan return	Summer	30 July 2020	
FW	(Czech Republic) Martin Zikl	(Czech Republic) Líšeň	Loan return	Summer	30 July 2020	
DF	(Czech Republic) Jan Moravec	(Czech Republic) Karviná	Free	Summer	3 August 2020	
MF	(Czech Republic) Jan Koudelka	(Czech Republic) Prostějov	Loan ^{(with option)}	Summer	20 August 2020	
DF	(Serbia) Zoran Gajić	(Bulgaria) Arda Kardzhali	Free	Summer	22 September 2020	
MF	(Czech Republic) Rudolf Reiter	(Czech Republic) Baník Ostrava	Loan ^{(without option)}	Summer	24 September 2020	
DF	(Czech Republic) Luděk Pernica	(Czech Republic) Viktoria Plzeň	Loan ^{(without option)}	Winter	8 January 2021	
MF	(Czech Republic) Jiří Texl	(Czech Republic) Sigma Olomouc	Loan ^{(with option)}	Winter	12 January 2021	
DF	(Slovakia) Timotej Záhumenský	(Slovakia) Nitra	Free	Winter	13 January 2021	
GK	(Czech Republic) Martin Berkovec	(Lithuania) Žalgiris	Free	Winter	25 January 2021	

=== Out ===
Pos	Player	Transferred to	Fee	Window	Date	Source
MF	(Czech Republic) David Krška	(Czech Republic) Líšeň	Undisclosed	Summer	29 July 2020	
DF	(Czech Republic) Petr Pavlík	(Czech Republic) Pohronie	Loan	Summer	29 July 2020	
MF	(Czech Republic) David Moučka	(Czech Republic) Vyškov	Loan	Summer	31 July 2020	
DF	(Czech Republic) Ondřej Vintr	(Czech Republic) Vyškov	Loan	Summer	31 July 2020	
DF	(Czech Republic) Pavel Eismann	Retired		Summer	31 July 2020	
MF	(Czech Republic) Dominik Kříž	(Czech Republic) Vyšehrad	Undisclosed	Summer	31 July 2020	
MF	(Czech Republic) Martin Zikl	(Czech Republic) Prostějov	Loan	Summer	20 August 2020	
FW	(Czech Republic) Martin Sedlák	(Czech Republic) Kroměříž	Loan	Summer	20 August 2020	
MF	(Czech Republic) David Jurásek	(Czech Republic) Prostějov	Undisclosed ^{(buy-back option)}	Summer	20 August 2020	
MF	(Czech Republic) Michal Ševčík	(Czech Republic) Jihlava	Loan	Summer	5 October 2020	
DF	(Slovakia) Juraj Kotula	Free agent		Winter	31 December 2020	
MF	(Czech Republic) Jan Koudelka	(Czech Republic) Prostějov	Loan return	Winter	31 December 2020	
DF	(Czech Republic) Jakub Černín	(Czech Republic) Blansko	Loan	Winter	8 February 2021	
FW	(Czech Republic) Claude Lhotecký	(Czech Republic) Blansko	Loan	Winter	8 February 2021	
MF	(Czech Republic) Marek Mach	(Czech Republic) Blansko	Undisclosed ^{(buy-back option)}	Winter	8 February 2021	
FW	(Czech Republic) Martin Zikl	(Czech Republic) Líšeň	Loan	Winter	8 February 2021	

== Friendly matches ==
=== Pre-season ===
July 31, 2020 Friendly	Blansko	2–0	Zbrojovka Brno	Blansko
17:00 CEST (UTC+2)	Martin Holek 58'; Žák 81'	Report		Stadium: Stadion v Mlýnské ulici Attendance: uzavřeno

August 5, 2020 Friendly	Sigma Olomouc	0–2	Zbrojovka Brno	Olomouc
10:00 CEST (UTC+2)		Report	Růsek 70'; Michal Ševčík 82'	Stadium: Andrův stadion Attendance: uzavřeno

August 8, 2020 Friendly	Vysočina Jihlava	1–2	Zbrojovka Brno	Jihlava
11:00 CEST (UTC+2)	Rajmond Mikuš 75'	Report	Šumbera 83'; Přichystal 86'	Stadium: Stadion v Jiráskově ulici Attendance: 200

August 12, 2020 Friendly	Zbrojovka Brno	2–3	Líšeň	Zastávka
17:30 CEST (UTC+2)	Fousek 35' (pen.), 46'	Report	Silný 3', 38'; Krška 50'	Stadium: Zastávka

August 15, 2020 Friendly	FC Fastav Zlín	1–2	Zbrojovka Brno	Zlín
17:00 CEST (UTC+2)	Poznar 19'	Report	Čermák 60'; Vintr 89'	Stadium: Letná Stadion

=== Mid-season ===
January 6, 2021 Tipsport Malta Cup	Zbrojovka Brno	0–2	WSG Swarovski Tirol	Ta' Qali, Malta
14:00 CEST (UTC+2)		Report	Dedić 67'; Frederiksen 69'	Stadium: National Stadium; Referee: Petrovic

January 9, 2021 Tipsport Malta Cup	Zbrojovka Brno	1–0	Spartak Trnava	Ta' Qali, Malta
14:00 CEST (UTC+2)	Fousek 29' (pen.); Vaněk (yellow card) 71'; Hladík (yellow card) 75'	Report		Stadium: National Stadium

== Competitions ==
Win Draw Loss

=== Overview ===
Competition	First match	Last match	Starting round	Final position	Record							
Competition	First match	Last match	Starting round	Final position	Pld	W	D	L	GF	GA	GD	Win %
Fortuna liga	22 August 2020	29 May 2021	Matchday 1	Matchday 34	34	5	11	18	33	57	−24	14.71
MOL Cup	7 October 2020	3 March 2021	Third round	Round of 16	2	1	0	1	1	2	−1	50.00
Total					36	6	11	19	34	59	−25	16.67

Last updated: 9 June 2021
Source: Competitions

=== Czech First League ===
==== Results summary ====
Overall								Home						Away					
Pld	W	D	L	GF	GA	GD	Pts	W	D	L	GF	GA	GD	W	D	L	GF	GA	GD
34	5	11	18	33	57	−24	26	2	5	10	15	28	−13	3	6	8	18	29	−11

Last updated: 9 June 2021.

==== Results by round ====
Round	1	2	3	4	5	6	7	8	9	10	11	12	13	14	15	16	17	18	19	20	21	22	23	24	25	26	27	28	29	30	31	32	33	34
Ground	H	H	A	A	H	A	H	A	H	A	H	H	A	H	A	H	A	A	H	A	H	A	H	A	H	A	H	A	H	A	H	A	H	A
Result	L	D	L	L	L	L	W	D	D	L	L	W	L	L	D	L	W	L	D	L	L	D	L	D	D	W	L	L	D	D	L	D	W	L
Position	17	14	16	18	18	18	16	16	16	16	17	16	16	16	16	16	15	15	15	15	16	16	16	16	16	16	16	16	16	16	16	17	16	16

Updated to match(es) played on 9 June 2021. Source:
A = Away; H = Home; W = Win; D = Draw; L = Loss

==== League table ====
Pos	Team	Pld	W	D	L	GF	GA	GD	Pts	Qualification or relegation
14	Fastav Zlín	34	8	8	18	30	50	−20	32	
15	Teplice	34	7	9	18	34	66	−32	30	
16	Zbrojovka Brno (R)	34	5	11	18	33	57	−24	26	Relegation to FNL
17	Příbram (R)	34	5	10	19	26	65	−39	25	Relegation to FNL
18	Opava (R)	34	3	8	23	23	71	−48	17	Relegation to FNL

Source: Fortuna Liga
Rules for classification: 1) Points; 2) Head-to-head points; 3) Head-to-head goal difference; 4) Head-to-head goals scored; 5) Goal difference; 6) Goals scored; 7) Fair-play ranking; 8) Draw.
(R) Relegated

==== Results ====
22 August 2020 1	Zbrojovka Brno	1–4	Sparta Praha	Brno
19:30 CEST (UTC+2)	Pachlopník (yellow card) 41'; Štepanovský 58'; Černín (yellow card) 71'	Report	Vindheim 4'; Juliš 11'; Čelůstka (yellow card) 16'; Dočkal 30', 35'; Krejčí ml. (yellow card) 44'; Sáček (yellow card) 68'; Štetina (yellow card) 68'	Stadium: Wedos Arena; Attendance: 2,500 (limited due to the COVID-19 pandemic precautions Referee: Pavel Franěk

30 August 2020 2	Zbrojovka Brno	0–0	Bohemians 1905	Brno
16:30 CEST (UTC+2)	Sedlák (yellow card) 64'; Čermák (yellow card) 89'	Report	Levin (yellow card) 90'	Stadium: Wedos Arena; Attendance: 2,499 (limited due to the COVID-19 pandemic precautions Referee: Zbyněk Proske

13 September 2020 3	Zlín	3–1	Zbrojovka Brno	Zlín
16:30 CEST (UTC+2)	Fantiš 23'; Dramé (yellow card) 40'; Jiráček 49'; Jawo 54'; Buchta (yellow card) 57'; Conde (yellow card) 77'	Report	Štepanovský 27'; Štepanovský (yellow card) 14' (yellow-red card) 41'; Hlavica (yellow card) 90'	Stadium: Letná Stadion; Attendance: 2,809; Referee: Ondřej Pechanec

20 September 2020 4	Zbrojovka Brno	2–4	Sigma Olomouc	Brno
15:30 CEST (UTC+2)	Přichystal 9'; Růsek 51'; Vaněk (yellow card) 67'	Report	Greššák 27'; Černín 61' (o.g.); Breite (yellow card) 65'; Falta 68'; Zifčák 76'; Poulolo (yellow card) 90'	Stadium: Wedos Arena; Attendance: 4,187; Referee: Jan Petřík

27 September 2020 5	Viktoria Plzeň	4–1	Zbrojovka Brno	Plzeň
15:30 CEST (UTC+2)	Čermák 2'; Kopic 44'; Beauguel 56' (pen.); Hořava 71'	Report	Hladík 68'; Přichystal (yellow card) 90'	Stadium: Doosan Arena; Attendance: 1,911 (limited due to the COVID-19 pandemic precautions Referee: Ondřej Ginzel

3 October 2020 6	Zbrojovka Brno	0–2	Karviná	Brno
16:30 CEST (UTC+2)	Růsek (yellow card) 41' (yellow-red card) 84'; Šural (yellow card) 73'	Report	Qose 58' (pen.); Ostrák 67'	Stadium: Wedos Arena; Attendance: 1,913 (limited due to the COVID-19 pandemic precautions Referee: Pavel Královec

6 November 2020 7	Jablonec	0–1	Zbrojovka Brno	Jablonec nad Nisou
18:00 CEST (UTC+2)	Krob (yellow card) 73'; R. Hrubý (yellow card) 90'	Report	Štepanovský (yellow card) 48'; Přichystal 54'	Stadium: Stadion Střelnice; Attendance: 0 (limited due to the COVID-19 pandemic precautions Referee: Ondřej Berka

22 November 2020 8	Zbrojovka Brno	1–1	Příbram	Brno
14:00 CEST (UTC+2)	Hladík 5'; Šumbera (yellow card) 24'; Sedlák (yellow card) 49'; Přichystal (yellow card) 75'; Štepanovský (yellow card) 82'	Report	Pilík 78' (pen.); Kočí (yellow card) 88'; Pilík (yellow card) 90'	Stadium: Wedos Arena; Attendance: 0 (limited due to the COVID-19 pandemic precautions Referee: Pavel Orel

29 November 2020 9	Slavia Praha	1–1	Zbrojovka Brno	Prague
18:30 CEST (UTC+2)	Dorley (yellow card) 56'; Musa (yellow card) 65'; Sima 68'	Report	Čermák (yellow card) 48'; Fousek (yellow card) 52'; Moravec (yellow card) 60'; Dreksa (yellow card) 61'; Bariš (yellow card) 85'; Šural 88'	Stadium: Sinobo Stadium; Attendance: 0 (limited due to the COVID-19 pandemic precautions Referee: Karel Hrubeš

6 December 2020 10	Zbrojovka Brno	1–3	České Budějovice	Brno
14:00CEST (UTC+2)	Gajić (yellow card) 8'; Štepanovský (yellow card) 18'; Růsek 53'; Vintr (yellow card) 87'	Report	Brandner 10', 16'; Talovierov (yellow card) 27'; Javorek (yellow card) 64'; Čavoš 90'; Horejš (yellow card) 90' (manager)	Stadium: Wedos Arena; Attendance: 0 (limited due to the COVID-19 pandemic precautions Referee: Ondřej Lerch

12 December 2020 11	Pardubice	2–1	Zbrojovka Brno	Prague
16:00 CEST (UTC+2)	Hlavatý (yellow card) 40'; Tischler 52'; Huf 54'; Cadu (yellow card) 79'; Sláma (yellow card) 90'	Report	Sedlák (yellow card) 35'; Bariš (yellow card) 73'; Šural (yellow card) 76'; Pachlopník 90'	Stadium: Ďolíček; Attendance: 0 (limited due to the COVID-19 pandemic precautions Referee: Ondřej Pechanec

16 December 2020 12	Zbrojovka Brno	2–1	Slovácko	Brno
14:00 CEST (UTC+2)	Vaněk 85' (pen.); Fousek 90'	Report	Srubek (yellow card) 24'; Hellebrand (yellow card) 43'; Srubek 76'; Kadlec (red card) 84'	Stadium: Wedos Arena; Attendance: 0 (limited due to the COVID-19 pandemic precautions Referee: Radek Dubravský

20 December 2020 13	Teplice	1–0	Zbrojovka Brno	Teplice
14:00 CEST (UTC+2)	Ljevaković (yellow card) 64'; Kučera 79'; Diviš (yellow card) 90'	Report	Sedlák (yellow card) 47'; Fousek (yellow card) 67'; Hladík (yellow card) 90'	Stadium: Na Stínadlech; Attendance: 0 (limited due to the COVID-19 pandemic precautions Referee: Tomáš Klíma

23 December 2020 14	Zbrojovka Brno	0–1	Baník Ostrava	Brno
15:00 CEST (UTC+2)	M. Vintr (yellow card) 53'; Fousek (yellow card) 71'; Hlavica (yellow card) 86'	Report	Dyjan 39' (pen.); Kaloč (yellow card) 76'	Stadium: Wedos Arena; Attendance: 0 (limited due to the COVID-19 pandemic precautions Referee: Ondřej Berka

16 January 2021 15	Mladá Boleslav	1–1	Zbrojovka Brno	Mladá Boleslav
14:00 CEST (UTC+2)	Matějovský 60'; Dancák (yellow card) 77' (yellow-red card) 89'	Report	Pernica 39'; Fousek (yellow card) 70'	Stadium: Lokotrans Aréna; Attendance: 0 (limited due to the COVID-19 pandemic precautions Referee: Ondřej Ginzel

22 January 2021 16	Zbrojovka Brno	0–3	Slovan Liberec	Brno
18:00 CEST (UTC+2)	Záhumenský (yellow card) 17'; Šural (yellow card) 64'; M. Vintr (yellow card) 83'	Report	Mosquera 25'; Rabušic 34'; Pešek 76'	Stadium: Wedos Arena; Attendance: 0 (limited due to the COVID-19 pandemic precautions Referee: Emanuel Marek

30 January 2021 17	Opava	0–2	Zbrojovka Brno	Opava
14:00 CEST (UTC+2)	Březina (yellow card) 31'; Hellebrand (yellow card) 85'; Jan Žídek (yellow card) 90'	Report	Šumbera 9'; Fousek 18'; Fousek (yellow card) 27'; Růsek (yellow card) 45'; Štepanovský (yellow card) 73'; Hladík 90'	Stadium: Městský stadion Attendance: 0 (limited due to the COVID-19 pandemic precautions Referee: Radek Dubravský

6 February 2021 18	Bohemians 1905	2–1	Zbrojovka Brno	Prague
16:00 CEST (UTC+2)	Necid 10'; Květ 41'; Pulkrab (yellow card) 90'; Bederka (yellow card) 90'	Report	Růsek 26'; Pernica (yellow card) 89'; Vaněk (yellow card) 90'; Sedlák (yellow card) 90'	Stadium: Ďolíček; Attendance: 0 (limited due to the COVID-19 pandemic precautions Referee: Ondřej Pechanec

13 February 2021 19	Zbrojovka Brno	0–0	Zlín	Brno
14:00 CEST (UTC+2)	Sedlák (yellow card) 70'; Doležal (yellow card) 90' (Goalkeeping coach )	Report	Conde (yellow card) 31'; Cedidla (yellow card) 52'; Simerský (yellow card) 60'	Stadium: Wedos Arena; Attendance: 0 (limited due to the COVID-19 pandemic precautions Referee: Petr Hocek

20 February 2021 20	Sigma Olomouc	1–0	Zbrojovka Brno	Olomouc
14:00 CEST (UTC+2)	Mihalík (yellow card) 77'; Chytil 90'	Report	Dreksa (yellow card) 72'; Pachlopník (yellow card) 74'	Stadium: Andrův stadion Attendance: 0 (limited due to the COVID-19 pandemic precautions Referee: Zbyněk Proske

27 February 2021 21	Zbrojovka Brno	0–1	Viktoria Plzeň	Brno
18:30 CEST (UTC+2)	Záhumenský (yellow card) 47'	Report	Čermák (yellow card) 41'; Beauguel 68'	Stadium: Wedos Arena; Attendance: 0 (limited due to the COVID-19 pandemic precautions Referee: Pavel Orel

7 March 2021 22	Karviná	1–1	Zbrojovka Brno	Karviná
14:00 CEST (UTC+2)	Tavares 11'; Jursa (yellow card) 71'; Mangabeira (yellow card) 87'	Report	Hlavica (yellow card) 15'; Fila (yellow card) 63'; Pernica 66'	Stadium: Městský stadion Attendance: 0 (limited due to the COVID-19 pandemic precautions Referee: Pavel Franěk

14 March 2021 23	Zbrojovka Brno	1–2	Jablonec	Brno
16:00 CEST (UTC+2)	Dreksa (yellow card) 35'; Pachlopník (yellow card) 64'; Fila 90+1'	Report	Pleštil 10'; Schranz 73'; Kratochvíl (yellow card) 75'	Stadium: Wedos Arena; Attendance: 0 (limited due to the COVID-19 pandemic precautions Referee: Karel Hrubeš

20 March 2021 24	Příbram	1–1	Zbrojovka Brno	Příbram
14:00 CEST (UTC+2)	Rezek (yellow card) 53'; Voltr 56'; Kingue (yellow card) 61'; Nový (yellow card) 74'	Report	Texl 28'; Záhumenský (yellow card) 90+1'	Stadium: Na Litavce; Attendance: 0 (limited due to the COVID-19 pandemic precautions Referee: Ondřej Ginzel

4 April 2021 25	Zbrojovka Brno	0–0	Slavia Praha	Brno
18:30 CEST (UTC+2)		Report	Vágner (red card) 18'; Bah (yellow card) 46'; Olayinka (yellow card) 76'	Stadium: Wedos Arena; Attendance: 0 (limited due to the COVID-19 pandemic precautions Referee: Pavel Orel

11 April 2021 26	České Budějovice	0–2	Zbrojovka Brno	České Budějovice
14:00 CEST (UTC+2)	Čolić (yellow card) 84'	Report	Texl 56'; Růsek 85' (pen.)	Stadium: Stadion Střelecký ostrov Attendance: 0 (limited due to the COVID-19 pandemic precautions Referee: Ondřej Pechanec

18 April 2021 27	Zbrojovka Brno	1–2	Pardubice	Brno
14:00 CEST (UTC+2)	Přichystal 69'	Report	Toml 42'; Ewerton 71'	Stadium: Wedos Arena; Attendance: 0 (limited due to the COVID-19 pandemic precautions Referee: Jan Petřík

21 April 2021 28	Slovácko	4–2	Zbrojovka Brno	Uherské Hradiště
15:00 CEST (UTC+2)	Havlík 11'; Reinberk (yellow card) 23'; Petržela 24'; Divíšek (yellow card) 44'; Daníček 66' (pen.); Jurečka 71'; Šimko (yellow card) 88'; Jurečka (yellow card) 90+1'	Report	Pernica 34' (pen.); Čermák (yellow card) 41'; Moravec (yellow card) 50'; Štepanovský (yellow card) 54'; Hladík (yellow card) 56'; Štepanovský 60'	Stadium: Městský fotbalový stadion Miroslava Valenty; Attendance: 0 (limited due to the COVID-19 pandemic precautions Referee: Ondřej Berka

25 April 2021 29	Zbrojovka Brno	0–0	Teplice	Brno
14:00 CEST (UTC+2)	Hlavica (yellow card) 23'; Růsek (yellow card) 55'	Report	Gabriel (red card) 43'; Jukl (yellow card) 64'; Kodad (yellow card) 70'; Mazuch (yellow card) 90'; Grigar (yellow card) 90+3'	Stadium: Wedos Arena; Attendance: 0 (limited due to the COVID-19 pandemic precautions Referee: Petr Franěk

1 May 2021 30	Baník Ostrava	1–1	Zbrojovka Brno	Ostrava
19:30 CEST (UTC+2)	Sanneh (yellow card) 15'; Buchta 53'; Ndefe (yellow card) 80'; Kaloč (yellow card) 90+1'	Report	Čermák (yellow card) 37'; Růsek (yellow card) 57'; Sedlák (yellow card) 73'; Štepanovský 79'	Stadium: Městský stadion Attendance: 617 (limited due to the COVID-19 pandemic precautions Referee: Petr Hocek

8 May 2021 31	Zbrojovka Brno	2–3	Mladá Boleslav	Brno
17:00 CEST (UTC+2)	Sedlák (yellow card) 21'; Dreksa (yellow card) half break'; Pernica 49' (pen.); Pachlopník (yellow card) 73'; Přichystal 74'	Report	Drchal 6', 47'; Douděra 38'; Preisler (yellow card) 90+2'	Stadium: Wedos Arena; Attendance: 280 (limited due to the COVID-19 pandemic precautions Referee: Petr Hocek, Zbyněk Proske

15 May 2021 32	Liberec	1–1	Zbrojovka Brno	Liberec
20:00 CEST (UTC+2)	Mosquera 77'	Report	Pernica (yellow card) 64'; Růsek 90+3'	Attendance: 850 (limited due to the COVID-19 pandemic precautions Referee: Ondřej Lerch

22 May 2021 33	Zbrojovka Brno	4–1	Opava	Brno
17:00 CEST (UTC+2)	Hladík 15', 21'; Hlavica (yellow card) 75'; Růsek 82', 89' (pen.)	Report	Večerka (yellow card) 67'; Helešic 75'; Rychlý (yellow card) 80'; Lasák (yellow card) 88'	Stadium: Wedos Arena; Attendance: 800 (limited due to the COVID-19 pandemic precautions Referee: Ladislav Szikszay

29 May 2021 34	Sparta Praha	6–1	Zbrojovka Brno	Prague
17:00 CEST (UTC+2)	Hložek 9' (pen.), 14', 26', 32'; Polidar 30'; Sedlák 42' (o.g.); Vitík (yellow card) 76'	Report	Hladík 5'; Jambor (yellow card) 48'	Stadium: Stadion Letná; Attendance: 2983 (limited due to the COVID-19 pandemic precautions Referee: Jan Machálek

=== Czech Cup ===
==== Results ====
cancelled Second round	Slovan Rosice	0–3	Zbrojovka Brno
		Report
Note: walkover

7 October 2020 Third round	Zbrojovka Brno	1–0	Vysočina Jihlava	Brno, Czech Republic
15:00 CEST (UTC+2)	Hlavica (yellow card) 15'; Koudelka (yellow card) 28'; M. Vintr (yellow card) 70'; Šumbera 87'; Štepanovský (yellow card) 90'	Report	Arroyo (yellow card) 70'	Stadium: Wedos Arena; Attendance: 0 (restricted due to the COVID-19 pandemic precautions Referee: Černý

3 March 2021 Round of 16	FK Teplice	2–0	Zbrojovka Brno	Teplice, Czech Republic
14:00 CEST (UTC+2)	Mareček (yellow card) 41'; Vukadinović 59'; Kučera (yellow card) 64'; Kodad 71'	Report	J. Sedlák (yellow card) 90+3'	Stadium: AGC Arena Na Stínadlech; Attendance: 0 (restricted due to the COVID-19 pandemic precautions Referee: Pechanec

== Squad statistics ==
=== Appearances and goals ===
No.	Pos	Nat	Player	Total		Fortuna Liga		MOL Cup	
No.	Pos	Nat	Player	Apps	Goals	Apps	Goals	Apps	Goals
Goalkeepers
1	GK	(Czech Republic) CZE	Vojtěch Marek	0	0	0	0	0	0
40	GK	(Czech Republic) CZE	Martin Šustr	11	0	10	0	1	0
53	GK	(Czech Republic) CZE	Martin Berkovec	11	0	11	0	0	0
59	GK	(Czech Republic) CZE	Jiří Floder	14	0	13	0	1	0
Defenders
4	DF	(Czech Republic) CZE	Jan Hlavica	19	0	14+3	0	2	0
6	DF	(Czech Republic) CZE	Pavel Dreksa	23	0	21+2	0	0	0
13	DF	(Czech Republic) CZE	Lukáš Endl	8	0	2+5	0	0+1	0
15	DF	(Serbia) SRB	Zoran Gajić	13	0	9+3	0	1	0
17	DF	(Czech Republic) CZE	Jan Moravec	29	0	24+4	0	1	0
23	DF	(Czech Republic) CZE	Jakub Šural	21	1	17+2	1	2	0
25	DF	(Czech Republic) CZE	Lukáš Kryštůfek	1	0	0+1	0	0	0
26	DF	(Slovakia) SVK	Timotej Záhumenský	8	0	5+2	0	1	0
44	DF	(Czech Republic) CZE	Luděk Pernica	20	4	19	4	1	0
Midfielders
5	MF	(Czech Republic) CZE	David Jambor	8	0	1+6	0	0+1	0
6	MF	(Czech Republic) CZE	Šimon Šumbera	18	1	9+7	0	0+2	1
7	MF	(Czech Republic) CZE	Rudolf Reiter	16	0	9+6	0	0+1	0
11	MF	(Czech Republic) CZE	Adam Fousek	25	2	15+9	2	1	0
13	MF	(Czech Republic) CZE	Jiří Texl	15	2	9+5	2	1	0
16	MF	(Czech Republic) CZE	Jan Sedlák	31	0	25+4	0	1+1	0
21	MF	(Czech Republic) CZE	Ondřej Pachlopník	32	1	23+8	1	0+1	0
24	MF	(Slovakia) SVK	Peter Štepanovský	32	4	26+4	4	2	0
27	MF	(Slovakia) SVK	Damián Bariš	23	0	15+6	0	2	0
29	MF	(Slovakia) SVK	Adrián Čermák	18	0	15+3	0	0	0
66	MF	(Czech Republic) CZE	Marek Vintr	7	0	0+6	0	0+1	0
90	MF	(Czech Republic) CZE	Ondřej Vaněk	17	1	12+4	1	0+1	0
	MF	(Czech Republic) CZE	Vojtěch Šmid	1	0	0+1	0	0	0
Forwards
10	FW	(Czech Republic) CZE	Antonín Růsek	30	7	24+6	7	0	0
14	FW	(Czech Republic) CZE	Jakub Přichystal	27	4	13+12	4	2	0
20	FW	(Czech Republic) CZE	Jan Hladík	33	6	19+13	6	0+1	0
35	FW	(Czech Republic) CZE	Daniel Fila	22	1	4+17	1	1	0
18	FW	(Czech Republic) CZE	Ibrahim Aldin	1	0	0	0	0+1	0
Players transferred/loaned out during the season
3	DF	(Czech Republic) CZE	Jakub Černín	5	0	3+2	0	0	0
28	DF	(Slovakia) SVK	Juraj Kotula	7	0	6+1	0	0	0
9	MF	(Czech Republic) CZE	Marek Mach	0	0	0	0	0	0
19	MF	(Czech Republic) CZE	Michal Ševčík	1	0	0+1	0	0	0
18	MF	(Czech Republic) CZE	Jan Koudelka	8	0	1+6	0	1	0
29	FW	(Czech Republic) CZE	Claude Lhotecký	1	0	0+1	0	0	0

Last updated: 10 June 2021
Source: Competitions

=== Goal Scorers ===
Place	Pos.	Name	Fortuna liga	Czech Cup	Total
1	FW	(Czech Republic) Antonín Růsek	7	0	7
2	FW	(Czech Republic) Jan Hladík	6	0	6
3	FW	(Czech Republic) Jakub Přichystal	4	0	4
3	DF	(Slovakia) Peter Štepanovský	4	0	4
3	DF	(Czech Republic) Luděk Pernica	4	0	4
6	MF	(Czech Republic) Adam Fousek	2	0	2
6	MF	(Czech Republic) Jiří Texl	2	0	2
8	DF	(Czech Republic) Jakub Šural	1	0	1
8	MF	(Czech Republic) Ondřej Pachlopník	1	0	1
8	FW	(Czech Republic) Daniel Fila	1	0	1
8	MF	(Czech Republic) Ondřej Vaněk	1	0	1
8	MF	(Czech Republic) Šimon Šumbera	0	1	1
Own goals			0	0	0
TOTAL			33	1	34

Last updated: 10 June 2021
Source: Competitions

=== Assists ===
Place	Pos.	Name	Fortuna liga	Czech Cup	Total
1	MF	(Czech Republic) Ondřej Pachlopník	4	0	4
2	FW	(Czech Republic) Jan Hladík	3	0	3
2	DF	(Slovakia) Peter Štepanovský	3	0	3
4	DF	(Czech Republic) Pavel Dreksa	2	0	2
4	FW	(Czech Republic) Antonín Růsek	2	0	2
4	MF	(Czech Republic) Ondřej Vaněk	2	0	2
4	MF	(Czech Republic) Jan Sedlák	1	1	2
8	DF	(Czech Republic) Jakub Černín	1	0	1
8	FW	(Czech Republic) Jakub Přichystal	1	0	1
8	DF	(Czech Republic) Jan Hlavica	1	0	1
8	MF	(Czech Republic) Adam Fousek	1	0	1
8	MF	(Czech Republic) Šimon Šumbera	1	0	1
8	DF	(Czech Republic) Jan Moravec	1	0	1
8	FW	(Czech Republic) Daniel Fila	1	0	1
TOTAL			24	1	25

Last updated: 10 June 2021
Source: Competitions

=== Clean sheets ===
Place	Position	Nation	Number	Name	Fortuna liga	Czech Cup	Total
1	GK	(Czech Republic)	53	Martin Berkovec	4	0	4
2	GK	(Czech Republic)	59	Jiří Floder	2	1	3
3	GK	(Czech Republic)	40	Martin Šustr	1	0	1
				TOTALS	7	1	8

Last updated: 10 June 2021
Source: Competitions

=== Disciplinary record ===
Number	Nation	Position	Name	Fortuna Liga		Czech Cup		Total	
Number	Nation	Position	Name	Yellow card	Red card	Yellow card	Red card	Yellow card	Red card
16	(Czech Republic)	MF	Jan Sedlák	8	0	1	0	9	0
24	(Slovakia)	DF	Peter Štepanovský	6	1	1	0	7	1
4	(Czech Republic)	DF	Jan Hlavica	5	0	1	0	6	0
11	(Czech Republic)	MF	Adam Fousek	5	0	0	0	5	0
10	(Czech Republic)	MF	Antonín Růsek	4	1	0	0	4	1
66	(Czech Republic)	MF	Marek Vintr	3	0	1	0	4	0
21	(Czech Republic)	MF	Ondřej Pachlopník	4	0	0	0	4	0
24	(Slovakia)	MF	Adrián Čermák	4	0	0	0	4	0
6	(Czech Republic)	DF	Pavel Dreksa	4	0	0	0	4	0
3	(Czech Republic)	DF	Jakub Šural	3	0	0	0	3	0
26	(Slovakia)	DF	Timotej Záhumenský	3	0	0	0	3	0
14	(Czech Republic)	FW	Jakub Přichystal	2	0	0	0	2	0
27	(Slovakia)	DF	Damián Bariš	2	0	0	0	2	0
8	(Czech Republic)	MF	Šimon Šumbera	2	0	0	0	2	0
90	(Czech Republic)	MF	Ondřej Vaněk	2	0	0	0	2	0
44	(Czech Republic)	DF	Luděk Pernica	2	0	0	0	2	0
17	(Czech Republic)	DF	Jan Moravec	2	0	0	0	2	0
20	(Czech Republic)	FW	Jan Hladík	2	0	0	0	2	0
3	(Czech Republic)	DF	Jakub Černín	1	0	0	0	1	0
15	(Serbia)	DF	Zoran Gajić	1	0	0	0	1	0
5	(Czech Republic)	MF	David Jambor	1	0	0	0	1	0
9	(Czech Republic)	MF	Daniel Fila	1	0	0	0	1	0
18	(Czech Republic)	MF	Jan Koudelka	0	0	1	0	1	0
Players away on loan:
Players who left Zbrojovka during the season:
			TOTALS	67	2	5	0	72	2

Last updated: 10 June 2021
Source: Competitions
