= Miloslav Machálek =

Czech footballer and manager

Personal information
- Date of birth: 20 July 1961 (age 65)
- Place of birth: Uherské Hradiště, Czechoslovakia
- Position: Centre back

Youth career
- TJ Sokol Slavkov

Senior career*
Years	Team	Apps	(Gls)
- VTJ Tábor
- Jiskra Staré Město
- MFK Vyškov
- TJ Sokol Slavkov

Managerial career
- 1999–2000: SK LeRK Prostějov
- 2000–2002: FC Vysočina Jihlava
- 2002–2003: 1. HFK Olomouc
- 2003: 1. FC Synot (interim)
- 2004: SC Xaverov
- 2004–2006: SK Uničov
- 2008–2009: SK Sigma Olomouc (youth)
- 2009: Sokol Konice
- 2010: MFK Vyškov
- 2010–2012: SK Uničov
- 2012–2016: MFK Vyškov
- 2017–2019: SK Líšeň
- 2019–2020: FC Zbrojovka Brno
- * Club domestic league appearances and goals

Miloslav Machálek (born 20 July 1961) is a Czech professional football manager who last managed Czech First League club Zbrojovka Brno.

== Early life and career ==
Machálek grew up in Slovácko region village of Slavkov, where he began his career in youth categories. From the age of 18 he often suffered from knee and cruciate ligament injuries that limited him in his career. After returning from the military service he played together with his brother in the Staré Město, Vyškov and in lower Austrian competitions. He ended his career in his home club.

== Managerial career ==
Machálek's first club as manager was SK LeRK Prostějov, whom he started coaching in 1999 in 1999–2000 Czech 2. Liga and finished on 12th place.

He subsequently worked for FC Vysočina Jihlava and 1. HFK Olomouc, managing both sides in the Czech 2. league.

In the following year he was appointed as an interim manager of 1. FC Synot, when the manager Radek Rabušic was sacked after only 4 rounds in the 2002–03 Czech First League.

During the 2003–04 Czech 2. Liga he was named manager of Prague based club SC Xaverov, but failed to avoid relegation to the Bohemian Football League (ČFL), the third tier of Czech football.

In the same year he joined Moravian–Silesian Football League (MSFL) local side SK Uničov and reached 3rd and 6th place in the third tier division. After that he worked as an academy manager and youth coach at SK Sigma Olomouc, leading U-15 team. In 2009 and 2010 he spent a brief spell at Sokol Konice and MFK Vyškov, both playing Czech Fourth Division.

He joined MSFL side SK Uničov for the second time in 2010 on a 3-year spell, reaching 6th and 5th place respectively. He resigned from his position in September 2012 after poor performance in the beginning of 2012–13 season.

In the winter break of 2012-13 Divize D he took charge of MFK Vyškov, which was last in the competition at the time. He helped the club to avoid relegation and finished in 9th place. Following season, he achieved with his team promotion to MSFL. In the next two years in MSFL, he reached 12th and 6th place in the third tier of Czech football.

=== Líšeň ===
In January 2017 Machálek signed for MSFL side SK Líšeň, located on the outskirts of the South Moravian capital Brno. In the second half of the season, Machálek guided the club to avoid relegation and helping them finish 12th in the 2016–17 MSFL season. In the following season SK Líšeň surprisingly reached 3rd place in MSFL, with 16 points loss on the advancing team 1. SK Prostějov, Machálek's former club. Before 2018-19 MSFL season, Líšeň took advantage of cooperation with the second Brno club Zbrojovka and brought on loan Jakub Černín and Jakub Přichystal, who scored 13 goals in 15 games in the first half of 2018-19 MSFL season, meaning that Líšeň was half-season champion. Despite the fall in form in the second half of the season, Líšeň secured promotion to 2019–20 Czech National Football League for the first time in club history, thanks to 2–1 victory in the last round at FK Hodonín.

In the premiere season in Czech 2. league, Líšeň presented with spontaneous and lively football under the guidance of Machálek and was the biggest surprise of the competition. He was determining offensive football tactics, mainly using 4–3–3 formation. After 11 rounds Líšeň had 13 points and reached 9th place in the competition.

=== Zbrojovka Brno ===
On 7 October 2019, rival team FC Zbrojovka Brno hired Machálek as their new coach, replacing Pavel Šustr. He led Zbrojovka for the first time on 10 October 2019 in the friendly game against Sigma Olomouc that took place at the legendary Stadion Za Lužánkami, reaching 2–0 win. On 18 October 2019, Machálek reached his first regular season win in the home match against Varnsdorf, that ended 4–1. In the next round, Zbrojovka lost in the game against FK Viktoria Žižkov, mainly due to the absence of several key players. By the end of the first half of the season, Zbrojovka managed to win all 3 matches. In the second part of the season, which was interrupted after the first round due to the COVID-19 pandemic, Zbrojovka held 14 matches unbeaten run. This resulted in the 2nd place of the table and ensuring participation in promotion play-offs. On 17 July, the League football association of the Czech Republic had a meeting on COVID-19 break and decided that the promotion play-offs will be canceled due to irregularity and tense deadline of the competition, and Zbrojovka will be promoted administratively to 2020–21 Czech First League.

== Style of management ==
Machálek is known for approaching a football philosophy clearly based on lively, quick and attacking play. His teams are well known for their fast, aggressive, and offensive style of play, as well as their ability to score many goals, but also for the corresponding tendency to concede them. He is influenced by the approach of Karel Brückner, Petr Uličný and Milan Bokša.

== Personal life ==
Machálek's son Tomáš plays for SK Líšeň. They worked together in several clubs in the past, such as in Konice, Uničov, Vyškov or Líšeň. Another son, Jan, is a football referee currently officiating in Fortuna liga. While managing SK Líšeň, Machálek also worked for Zbrojovka Brno as a scout and consultant as well as an official at the Regional Authority of the Olomouc Region. During his spell in Xaverov, he met Jindřich Trpišovský in his early stages of coaching career, cited being Trpišovský's mentor. He mentions Karel Brückner as his greatest coaching role model.

== Managerial statistics ==
As of 16 December 2020

Team	Nat	From	To	Record							
Team	Nat	From	To	G	W	D	L	GF	GA	GD	Win %
SK Líšeň	(Czech Republic)	1 January 2017	7 October 2019	88	47	18	23	184	124	+60	53.41
FC Zbrojovka Brno	(Czech Republic)	7 October 2019	15 December 2020	30	16	6	8	65	40	+25	53.33
Total				118	63	24	31	249	164	+85	53.39

== Honours ==
=== Managerial ===
MFK Vyškov

- Divize D: 2013–14

SK Líšeň

- Moravian–Silesian Football League: 2018–19

FC Zbrojovka Brno

- Czech National Football League (runner-up): 2019–20
