= Erik Otrísal =

Slovak footballer (born 1996)

Personal information
- Full name: Erik Otrísal
- Date of birth: 28 June 1996 (age 30)
- Place of birth: Myjava, Slovakia
- Height: 1.83 m (6 ft 0 in)
- Position: Defender

Team information
- Current team: HS Kroměříž (on loan from Artis Brno)
- Number: 5

Youth career
- 2004–2014: Senica

Senior career*
Years	Team	Apps	(Gls)
2014–2019	Senica	42	(0)
2016	→ Topvar Topoľčany (loan)		
2017	→ Spartak Trnava B (loan)	11	(0)
2019–2020	Železiarne Podbrezová	9	(0)
2020	TJ Sokol Lanžhot		
2021–	Artis Brno	101	(1)
2026–	→ HS Kroměříž (loan)	12	(0)

International career
2013	Slovakia U17	1	(0)
- * Club domestic league appearances and goals as of 15 June 2025

Erik Otrísal (born 28 June 1996) is a Slovak professional footballer who plays as a defender for Czech National Football League club HS Kroměříž, on loan from Artis Brno.

== Club career ==
Otrísal made his Fortuna Liga debut for Senica against Nitra on 31 May 2014. Having joined Senica at the age of 8, he was 17 years old on his debut and later became captain of the club. After the onset of the COVID-19 pandemic in Slovakia, he moved to the Czech Republic to play for TJ Sokol Lanžhot in the Czech Fourth Division. Otrísal joined Czech side SK Líšeň in 2021, playing there for five years until being loaned out for the second half of the 2025–26 Czech National Football League to HS Kroměříž.
