= David Krška =

Czech footballer

Personal information
- Date of birth: 4 August 1994 (age 32)
- Place of birth: Brno, Czech Republic
- Height: 1.69 m (5 ft 6 1/2 in)
- Position: Attacking midfielder

Team information
- Current team: SC-ESV Parndorf 1919
- Number: 10

Youth career
- 2000–2012: FC Zbrojovka Brno

Senior career*
Years	Team	Apps	(Gls)
2012–2016	FC Zbrojovka Brno B	79	(10)
2015–2016	→ Kroměříž (loan)	13	(0)
2016–2019	SK Líšeň	102	(33)
2019–2020	FC Zbrojovka Brno	24	(1)
2020–2022	SK Líšeň	38	(1)
2021	→ MFK Vyškov (loan)	2	(0)
2022–2024	MFK Vyškov	21	(1)
2023	→ Tatran Bohunice (loan)	11	(3)
2024–2025	SC Retz	25	(4)
2026–	SC-ESV Parndorf 1919	15	(0)
- * Club domestic league appearances and goals as of 25 June 2026

David Krška (born 4 August 1994) is a Czech football player who currently plays for SC-ESV Parndorf 1919 in Austria.
