= Martin Šustr =

Czech footballer (1990–2022)

Personal information
- Date of birth: 3 October 1990
- Place of birth: Boskovice, Czechoslovakia
- Date of death: 18 May 2022 (aged 31)
- Place of death: Svitávka, Czech Republic
- Height: 1.86 m (6 ft 1 in)
- Position: Goalkeeper

Senior career*
Years	Team	Apps	(Gls)
2009–2013	Sigma Olomouc	5	(0)
2009	→ Uničov (loan)		
2010–2011	→ Znojmo (loan)	9	(0)
2013–2015	Sulko Zábřeh		
2015–2017	Hanácká Kroměříž		
2017–2019	Baník Ostrava	5	(0)
2018	→ Vítkovice (loan)	15	(0)
2019	Vyškov		
2019	Líšeň	14	(0)
2020–2021	Zbrojovka Brno	19	(0)
2021	Vyškov	12	(0)
2022	Kozlovice		
- * Club domestic league appearances and goals

Martin Šustr (3 October 1990 – 18 May 2022) was a Czech professional footballer who played as a goalkeeper.

== Career ==
Šustr joined Uničov on loan from Sigma Olomouc in the 2009–10 season. In January 2017, Šustr moved to Baník Ostrava. On 15 March 2019, he then joined MFK Vyškov.

Having played 14 games for the club, he left in the summer and signed with SK Líšeň on 14 July 2019. In January 2020, he then joined FC Zbrojovka Brno.

Šustr died in a car accident on 18 May 2022, at the age of 31.
