= Guy Reteno Elekana =

Gabonese footballer

Personal information
- Full name: Guy Reteno Elekana
- Date of birth: 25 September 1996 (age 30)
- Place of birth: Gabon
- Position: Forward

Team information
- Current team: SK Líšeň
- Number: 13

Youth career
- -2014: FC Sapins
- 2014-2015: Casa Pia

Senior career*
Years	Team	Apps	(Gls)
2015–2017	ESC Longueau		
2017–2018	FC Viktoria Otrokovice	5	(2)
2018–	SK Líšeň	45	(12)
- * Club domestic league appearances and goals as of 9 January 2021

Guy Reteno Elekana (born 25 September 1996) is a Gabonese professional footballer who plays as a forward for Czech club SK Líšeň.
