= 2018–19 Czech First League =

26th season of top-tier football league in Czech Republic

Czech First League
- Season: 2018–19
- Dates: 20 July 2018 – 1 June 2019
- Champions: Slavia Prague
- Relegated: Dukla Prague
- Champions League: Slavia Prague; Viktoria Plzeň
- Europa League: Sparta Prague; Jablonec; Mladá Boleslav
- Matches: 277
- Goals: 743 (2.68 per match)
- Top goalscorer: Nikolay Komlichenko (29 goals)
- Biggest home win: Viktoria Plzeň 6–1 Mladá Boleslav, Mladá Boleslav 6–1 Opava, Opava 5–0 Příbram
- Biggest away win: Teplice 0–8 Mladá Boleslav
- Highest scoring: Teplice 0–8 Mladá Boleslav, Dukla Prague 2–6 Jablonec
- Longest winning run: 6 matches Slavia Prague, Viktoria Plzeň
- Longest unbeaten run: 14 matches Viktoria Plzeň
- Longest winless run: 10 matches Dukla Prague
- Longest losing run: 7 matches Dukla Prague
- Highest attendance: 19,370
- Lowest attendance: 654
- Average attendance: 5,539

The 2018–19 Czech First League, known as the Fortuna liga for sponsorship reasons, was the 26th season of the Czech Republic's top-tier football league. The defending champions were Viktoria Plzeň, who won their fifth Czech title the previous season. The season was the first with a new league structure in which 16 clubs play each other home and away, until the league is split up into championship, Europa League and relegation groups. Dukla Prague lost seven consecutive games at the start of the season, becoming the first team in the Czech First League to do so.

== Teams ==
=== Team changes ===
Promoted from 2017–18 Czech National Football League	Relegated from 2017–18 Czech First League
SFC Opava; 1. FK Příbram	FC Vysočina Jihlava; FC Zbrojovka Brno

=== Stadiums and locations ===
Locations of the 2018–19 Czech First League teams

Team	Location	Stadium	Capacity	Ref.
Baník Ostrava	Ostrava	Městský stadion (Ostrava)	15,123	
Bohemians 1905	Prague	Ďolíček	5,000	
Dukla Prague	Prague	Stadion Juliska	8,150	
Jablonec	Jablonec nad Nisou	Stadion Střelnice	6,108	
Karviná	Karviná	Městský stadion (Karviná)	4,833	
Mladá Boleslav	Mladá Boleslav	Městský stadion (Mladá Boleslav)	5,000	
Opava	Opava	Městský stadion Opava	7,758	
Příbram	Příbram	Na Litavce	9,100	
Sigma Olomouc	Olomouc	Andrův stadion	12,483	
Slavia Prague	Prague	Eden Arena	20,232	
Slovácko	Uherské Hradiště	Městský fotbalový stadion Miroslava Valenty	8,000	
Slovan Liberec	Liberec	Stadion u Nisy	9,900	
Sparta Prague	Prague	Generali Arena	18,887	
Teplice	Teplice	Na Stínadlech	18,221	
Viktoria Plzeň	Plzeň	Doosan Arena	11,700	
Fastav Zlín	Zlín	Letná Stadion	5,783	

== Regular season ==
=== League table ===
Pos	Team	Pld	W	D	L	GF	GA	GD	Pts	Qualification or relegation
1	Slavia Prague	30	23	3	4	72	23	+49	72	Qualification for the championship group
2	Viktoria Plzeň	30	21	5	4	47	27	+20	68	Qualification for the championship group
3	Sparta Prague	30	17	6	7	52	27	+25	57	Qualification for the championship group
4	Jablonec	30	15	6	9	53	26	+27	51	Qualification for the championship group
5	Baník Ostrava	30	13	6	11	38	36	+2	45	Qualification for the championship group
6	Slovan Liberec	30	11	9	10	33	28	+5	42	Qualification for the championship group
7	Mladá Boleslav (O)	30	11	9	10	52	44	+8	42	Qualification for the Europa League play-offs
8	Sigma Olomouc	30	12	4	14	37	43	−6	40	Qualification for the Europa League play-offs
9	Fastav Zlín	30	12	3	15	32	40	−8	39	Qualification for the Europa League play-offs
10	Teplice	30	10	6	14	32	42	−10	36	Qualification for the Europa League play-offs
11	Bohemians 1905	30	8	10	12	29	37	−8	34	Qualification for the relegation group
12	Slovácko	30	10	4	16	32	45	−13	34	Qualification for the relegation group
13	Opava	30	9	6	15	39	49	−10	33	Qualification for the relegation group
14	Příbram	30	8	7	15	33	63	−30	31	Qualification for the relegation group
15	Karviná	30	8	5	17	39	53	−14	29	Qualification for the relegation group
16	Dukla Prague	30	5	5	20	25	62	−37	20	Qualification for the relegation group

Source: Fortuna liga, Soccerway
Rules for classification: 1) Points; 2) Head-to-head points; 3) Head-to-head goal difference; 4) Head-to-head goals scored; 5) Goal difference; 6) Goals scored; 7) Fair-play ranking; 8) Draw.
(O) Play-off winners

=== Results ===
Each team plays home-and-away against every other team in the league, for a total of 30 matches played each.

Home \ Away	OST	B05	DUK	JAB	KAR	MLA	OPA	PRI	SIG	SLA	SLK	LIB	SPA	TEP	VPL	ZLN
Baník Ostrava	—	2–0	2–0	1–0	1–1	1–1	2–0	3–0	0–0	2–1	0–3	2–1	0–1	3–1	0–1	1–2
Bohemians 1905	0–1	—	0–0	1–0	0–0	0–0	0–0	2–2	0–1	0–3	2–1	0–0	1–1	2–3	2–2	0–1
FK Dukla Prague	1–1	0–1	—	2–6	2–1	2–2	1–0	1–2	0–4	1–5	1–2	2–0	2–3	1–0	1–3	1–1
Jablonec	4–0	3–1	2–1	—	4–1	0–3	2–2	3–0	3–0	0–2	2–0	0–0	1–2	2–1	3–0	4–0
Karviná	2–0	0–3	0–2	2–1	—	3–4	1–1	4–1	2–3	1–3	2–1	2–1	1–3	1–1	0–1	2–0
Mladá Boleslav	2–2	3–0	0–0	1–0	1–1	—	6–1	2–0	0–4	0–1	5–1	1–2	2–1	1–1	1–1	3–0
Opava	2–1	0–1	2–0	2–0	1–3	2–1	—	5–0	2–1	2–3	2–2	1–1	0–3	2–0	1–2	1–2
Příbram	0–2	4–2	4–0	0–6	2–1	3–0	3–1	—	1–0	0–2	0–3	1–3	1–1	1–1	1–1	3–2
Sigma Olomouc	1–4	2–3	1–0	1–2	3–2	0–4	2–2	2–0	—	0–3	1–0	2–1	1–0	2–0	0–1	1–1
Slavia Prague	4–0	1–0	4–1	0–2	4–0	3–2	3–1	4–1	2–1	—	4–0	1–1	1–1	2–0	4–0	3–1
Slovácko	2–1	1–1	1–0	0–0	2–0	1–1	0–2	2–0	3–1	1–3	—	0–1	2–1	0–2	0–1	0–4
Slovan Liberec	0–0	1–1	2–0	0–0	1–0	1–0	1–2	4–0	3–0	0–1	3–2	—	0–1	2–2	1–1	1–0
Sparta Prague	3–2	1–0	2–0	0–0	1–3	4–1	2–0	2–2	2–1	2–2	1–0	4–1	—	0–1	4–0	2–0
Teplice	0–1	1–2	5–2	1–2	2–1	0–2	3–2	0–0	0–0	0–3	2–0	1–0	0–4	—	2–1	2–1
Viktoria Plzeň	2–1	3–2	4–0	1–0	2–1	6–1	1–0	1–1	2–0	2–0	2–1	1–0	1–0	1–0	—	1–0
Fastav Zlín	1–2	0–2	2–1	1–1	2–1	3–2	2–0	3–0	0–2	1–0	0–1	0–1	1–0	1–0	0–2	—

Source: Fortuna liga, Soccerway
Legend: Blue = home team win; Yellow = draw; Red = away team win.

== Championship group ==
Points and goals were carried over in full from the regular season.

Pos	Team	Pld	W	D	L	GF	GA	GD	Pts	Qualification	SLA	VPL	SPA	JAB	OST	LIB
1	Slavia Prague (C)	35	26	5	4	79	26	+53	83	Qualification for the Champions League play-off round	—	3–1	2–1	2–1	—	—
2	Viktoria Plzeň	35	24	6	5	57	32	+25	78	Qualification for the Champions League second qualifying round	—	—	4–0	2–1	1–1	—
3	Sparta Prague	35	20	6	9	59	33	+26	66	Qualification for the Europa League third qualifying round	—	—	—	2–0	3–0	1–0
4	Jablonec	35	17	6	12	58	32	+26	57	Qualification for the Europa League second qualifying round	—	—	—	—	2–0	1–0
5	Baník Ostrava	35	13	8	14	39	43	−4	47	Qualification for the Europa League play-offs final	0–0	—	—	—	—	0–1
6	Slovan Liberec	35	12	10	13	34	32	+2	46		0–0	0–2	—	—	—	—

Source: Fortuna liga, Soccerway
Rules for classification: 1) Points; 2) Head-to-head points; 3) Head-to-head goal difference; 4) Head-to-head goals scored; 5) Goal difference; 6) Goals scored; 7) Fair-play ranking; 8) Draw.
(C) Champions

== Europa League play-offs ==
Teams placed between 7th and 10th position will take part in the Europa league play-offs. The best of them will play against the fifth-placed of the championship play-offs to determine the Europa League play-off winners. The winners will qualify for the second qualifying round of the 2019–20 UEFA Europa League.

First round
Fastav Zlín (a)	1	2	3
Sigma Olomouc	0	3	3
Teplice	0	1	1
Mladá Boleslav	8	1	9

Second round
Fastav Zlín	3	0	3
Mladá Boleslav	1	3	4

=== Final ===
1 June 2019
15:00 CEST

Baník Ostrava	0–1	Mladá Boleslav
	Report	Komlichenko 12'

Městský stadion, Ostrava
Attendance: 10,368
Referee: Pavel Franěk

== Relegation group ==
Points and goals were carried over in full from the regular season.

Pos	Team	Pld	W	D	L	GF	GA	GD	Pts	Qualification or relegation	SLK	OPA	B05	PRI	KAR	DUK
11	Slovácko	35	13	6	16	43	47	−4	45		—	4–1	—	5–1	2–1	—
12	Opava	35	12	7	16	47	57	−10	43		—	—	—	2–1	1–0	3–2
13	Bohemians 1905	35	9	13	13	33	43	−10	40		0–0	2–1	—	1–4	—	—
14	Příbram (O)	35	11	7	17	43	73	−30	40	Qualification for the relegation play-offs	—	—	—	—	1–0	3–2
15	Karviná (O)	35	9	5	21	42	58	−16	32	Qualification for the relegation play-offs	—	—	0–1	—	—	3–0
16	Dukla Prague (R)	35	5	7	23	30	72	−42	22	Relegation to FNL	0–0	—	1–1	—	—	—

Source: Fortuna liga, Soccerway
Rules for classification: 1) Points; 2) Head-to-head points; 3) Head-to-head goal difference; 4) Head-to-head goals scored; 5) Goal difference; 6) Goals scored; 7) Fair-play ranking; 8) Draw.
(O) Play-off winners; (R) Relegated

== Relegation play-offs ==
Teams placed 14th and 15th in the relegation group will face 2nd and 3rd teams from Czech National Football League for two spots in the next season.

Team 1	Agg.	Team 2	1st leg	2nd leg
Karviná	3–2	Vysočina Jihlava	2–1	1–1
Zbrojovka Brno	3–3	Příbram	3–3	0–0

=== Match 1 ===
28 May 2019
18:00 UTC+2

Karviná	2–1	Vysočina Jihlava
Guba 8'; Lingr 42'	Report	Klíma 53'

Městský stadion, Karviná
Attendance: 3,456
Referee: Milan Matějček

2 June 2019
18:30 UTC+2

Vysočina Jihlava	1–1	Karviná
Zoubele 14'	Report	Faško 70'

Stadion v Jiráskově ulici, Jihlava
Attendance: 3,150
Referee: Martin Nenadál

MFK Karviná won 3–2 on aggregate and retained their spot in the 2019–20 Czech First League; Vysočina Jihlava remained in the 2019–20 Czech National Football League.

=== Match 2 ===
29 May 2019
18:00 UTC+2

Zbrojovka Brno	3–3	Příbram
Magera 19'; Šumbera 40'; Magera 66'	Report	Matoušek 6'; Kodr 11'; Keita 89'

Městský fotbalový stadion Srbská, Brno
Attendance: 8,523
Referee: Ondřej Berka

2 June 2019
18:30 UTC+2

Příbram	0–0	Zbrojovka Brno
	Report

Na Litavce, Příbram
Attendance: 4,852
Referee: Petr Ardeleánu

1. FK Příbram won 3–3 on aggregate with away goals and retained their spot in the 2019–20 Czech First League; FC Zbrojovka Brno remained in the 2019–20 Czech National Football League.

== Top scorers ==
Rank	Name	Club(s)	Goals
1	(Russia) Nikolay Komlichenko	Mladá Boleslav	29
2	(Czech Republic) Martin Doležal	Jablonec	15
2	(France) Jean-David Beauguel	Fastav Zlín / Viktoria Plzeň	15
4	(Czech Republic) Tomáš Wágner	Karviná	13
4	(Czech Republic) Tomáš Souček	Slavia Prague	13
6	(Slovakia) Miroslav Stoch	Slavia Prague	12
6	(Gabon) Guélor Kanga	Sparta Prague	12
8	(Czech Republic) Jakub Hora	Teplice	11
8	(Ghana) Benjamin Tetteh	Sparta Prague	11
10	(Czech Republic) Michal Trávník	Jablonec	10
10	(Czech Republic) Jan Matoušek	Příbram	10

== Attendances ==
Pos	Team	Total	High	Low	Average	Change
1	Slavia Prague	243,198	19,370	9,091	13,511	+8.7%
2	Sparta Prague	199,299	17,398	6,420	11,072	−2.8%
3	Baník Ostrava	187,837	15,100	5,115	10,435	+32.3%
4	Viktoria Plzeň	159,892	11,489	5,316	8,883	−7.2%
5	Slovan Liberec	85,000	9,546	1,958	5,000	+0.1%
6	Sigma Olomouc	74,357	10,667	2,459	4,647	−12.9%
7	Bohemians 1905	76,118	5,000	3,041	4,229	+2.7%
8	Slovácko	75,345	6,586	2,823	4,186	−6.9%
9	Fastav Zlín	65,087	5,898	3,065	3,829	−8.5%
10	Teplice	56,694	15,131	1,187	3,543	−20.1%
11	Příbram	58,145	7,132	1,638	3,420	n/a
12	Opava	57,485	6,385	953	3,194	n/a
13	Karviná	51,835	4,833	1,942	3,049	−14.2%
14	Jablonec	49,252	5,950	1,608	2,897	−10.3%
15	Mladá Boleslav	49,237	5,000	1,236	2,896	+0.4%
16	Dukla Prague	45,595	7,765	654	2,682	−4.7%
	League total	1,534,376	19,370	654	5,539	−0.1%

Source: Fortunaliga.cz

== See also ==
- 2018–19 Czech Cup
- 2018–19 Czech National Football League
