= Luis Arroyo (Ecuadorian footballer) =

Ecuadorian footballer (born 1996)

Personal information
- Full name: Luis Aldair Arroyo Cabeza
- Date of birth: 8 April 1996 (age 30)
- Place of birth: Quinindé, Ecuador
- Position: Forward

Team information
- Current team: S.D. Aucas
- Number: 29

Youth career
- –2012: Club Águilas
- 2013–2015: U. Católica
- 2013–2015: América de Quito
- 2015–2016: Quevedo

Senior career*
Years	Team	Apps	(Gls)
2016	Macará		
2017	Gualaceo		
2018	Azogues		
2019–2020	Třinec	22	(3)
2020–2022	Vysočina Jihlava	16	(2)
2023–2024	Deportivo Cuenca	18	(1)
2024	Atlético Atlanta	12	(1)
2025	Deportivo Cuenca	21	(3)
- * Club domestic league appearances and goals as of 00:00, 3 October 2020 (UTC)

Luis Aldair Arroyo cabeza Aldair Arroyo Cabeza (born 8 April 1996) is an Ecuadorian footballer who plays as a forward for Aucas.

== Career statistics ==
=== Club ===
As of 20 December 2019

Club	Season	League			Cup		Other		Total	
Club	Season	Division	Apps	Goals	Apps	Goals	Apps	Goals	Apps	Goals
Třinec	2018–19	Fortuna národní liga	8	3	0	0	0	0	8	3
Třinec	2019–20	Fortuna národní liga	14	0	1 (Note: Appearances in the Czech Cup)	0	0	0	15	0
Career total			22	3	1	0	0	0	23	3
