= Marek Vintr =

Czech footballer

Personal information
- Date of birth: 1 August 1997 (age 29)
- Place of birth: Brno, Czech Republic
- Height: 1.85 m (6 ft 1 in)
- Position: Midfielder

Team information
- Current team: FC Zbrojovka Brno)
- Number: 66

Youth career
- 2003−2009: FC Bučovice
- 2009−2014: FC Zbrojovka Brno
- 2014−2015: MFK Vyškov
- 2015−2017: FC Zbrojovka Brno

Senior career*
Years	Team	Apps	(Gls)
2018−	FC Zbrojovka Brno	20	(2)
2014−2015	→ MFK Vyškov (loan)	3	(0)
2015−2016	→ SK Líšeň (loan)	3	(0)
2018	→ MFK Vyškov (loan)	14	(6)
2019	→ SK Líšeň (loan)	13	(6)

International career^{‡}
2015	Czech Republic U-19	1	(0)
- * Club domestic league appearances and goals as of 31 January 2021 ‡ National team caps and goals as of 3 August 2019

Martin Vintr (born 1 August 1997) is a Czech football player who currently plays for Zbrojovka Brno.

== Club career ==
=== FC Zbrojovka Brno ===
He made his professional debut for Zbrojovka Brno against Teplice on 13 May 2018.
