= Adrián Čermák =

Slovak footballer

Personal information
- Full name: Adrián Čermák
- Date of birth: 1 July 1993 (age 33)
- Place of birth: Malacky, Slovakia
- Height: 1.88 m (6 ft 2 in)
- Position: Midfielder

Team information
- Current team: Vysočina Jihlava
- Number: 27

Youth career
- Inter Bratislava
- Slovan Bratislava

Senior career*
Years	Team	Apps	(Gls)
2011–2016	Slovan Bratislava	5	(0)
2013	→ Nitra (loan)	7	(1)
2015–2016	→ Skalica (loan)	23	(0)
2016–2019	Dynamo České Budějovice	20	(0)
2019	→ MAS Táborsko (loan)	13	(1)
2019	Líšeň	16	(2)
2020–2022	Zbrojovka Brno	51	(5)
2022–2024	Líšeň	54	(12)
2024–	Vysočina Jihlava	54	(4)
- * Club domestic league appearances and goals as of 28 May 2026

Adrián Čermák (born 1 July 1993) is a Slovak professional footballer who plays as a midfielder for Vysočina Jihlava.

== Club career ==
=== ŠK Slovan Bratislava ===
Čermák made his debut for Slovan Bratislava against PŠC Pezinok in the 2nd leg of the 2011–12 Slovak Cup.
