= Jiří Floder =

Czech footballer

Personal information
- Date of birth: 3 January 1997 (age 29)
- Place of birth: Brno, Czech Republic
- Height: 1.90 m (6 ft 3 in)
- Position: Goalkeeper

Team information
- Current team: FK Mladá Boleslav
- Number: 59

Youth career
- 2004−2013: TJ Tatran Starý Lískovec
- 2013−2018: FC Zbrojovka Brno

Senior career*
Years	Team	Apps	(Gls)
2018−2022	FC Zbrojovka Brno	44	(0)
2016−2017	→ FK Blansko (loan)	27	(0)
2018	→ SK HS Kroměříž (loan)	12	(0)
2022	→ Chrudim (loan)	13	(0)
2022–2024	Chrudim	57	(0)
2024–	Mladá Boleslav	27	(0)
2024–2025	Mladá Boleslav B	8	(0)

International career
2012–2013	Czech Republic U16	2	(0)
2016	Czech Republic U19	1	(0)
- * Club domestic league appearances and goals as of 27 May 2026

Jiří Floder (born 3 January 1997) is a Czech footballer who plays as goalkeeper for FK Mladá Boleslav.
