= 2019–20 Czech National Football League =

Czech National Football League
- Champions: Pardubice
- Promoted: Pardubice, Zbrojovka Brno
- Relegated: Sokolov, Vítkovice
- Matches: 240
- Goals: 740 (3.08 per match)
- Top goalscorer: Stanislav Klobása (17 goals)
- Biggest home win: Hradec Králové 8–0 Varnsdorf
- Biggest away win: Vyšehrad 2–7 Brno

The 2019–20 Czech National Football League (known as the Fortuna národní liga for sponsorship reasons) was the 27th season of the Czech Republic's second tier football league. Fixtures for the season were announced on 19 June 2019. Pardubice won the competition, while relegation was confirmed for Sokolov and Vítkovice.

Třinec returned positive COVID-19 tests in June 2020, resulting in an enforced 14-day quarantine for their team and the postponement of three of their matches. Their home match against Vlašim, which Třinec lost on 17 July 2020, was subsequently played three days after the rest of the league had finished.

== Team changes ==
=== From FNL ===
- České Budějovice (promoted to 2019–20 Czech First League)
- Znojmo (relegated to Moravian-Silesian Football League)
- Táborsko (relegated to Bohemian Football League)

=== To FNL ===
- FK Dukla Prague (relegated from 2018–19 Czech First League)
- FK Slavoj Vyšehrad (promoted from 2018–19 Bohemian Football League)
- SK Líšeň (promoted from 2018–19 Moravian–Silesian Football League)

== Team overview ==
Location of clubs in the 2019–20 2. Liga

== League table ==
Pos	Team	Pld	W	D	L	GF	GA	GD	Pts	Promotion or relegation
1	FK Pardubice (C, P)	30	22	4	4	55	19	+36	70	Promotion to 2020–21 I. liga
2	FC Zbrojovka Brno (P)	30	20	7	3	75	29	+46	67	Promotion to 2020–21 I. liga
3	FK Dukla Prague	30	19	2	9	62	40	+22	59	
4	FC Hradec Králové	30	15	9	6	54	29	+25	54	
5	Viktoria Žižkov	30	15	4	11	45	40	+5	49 (Note: Head-to-head points: Viktoria Žižkov 4, Vysočina Jihlava 1)	
6	Vysočina Jihlava	30	14	7	9	59	46	+13	49	
7	Ústí nad Labem	30	11	8	11	46	47	−1	41	
8	FC Sellier & Bellot Vlašim	30	11	4	15	32	43	−11	37	
9	Líšeň	30	8	12	10	49	47	+2	36 (Note: Head-to-head points: Líšeň 6, Chrudim 0)	
10	Chrudim	30	10	6	14	44	61	−17	36	
11	1. SK Prostějov	30	8	11	11	33	42	−9	35	
12	Slavoj Vyšehrad	30	9	6	15	40	55	−15	33	
13	Fotbal Třinec	30	7	10	13	40	55	−15	31	
14	FK Varnsdorf	30	6	8	16	37	65	−28	26 (Note: Head-to-head goal difference: Varnsdorf +2, Baník Sokolov -2)	
15	Baník Sokolov (R)	30	7	5	18	34	51	−17	26	Relegation to 2020–21 ČFL
16	MFK Vítkovice (R)	30	4	5	21	35	71	−36	17	Relegation to 2020–21 MSFL

Source: Fortuna národní liga
Rules for classification: 1) Points; 2) Head-to-head points; 3) Head-to-head goal difference; 4) Head-to-head goals scored; 5) Goal difference; 6) Goals scored; 7) Play-off (if deciding promotion or relegation); 8) Draw
(C) Champions; (P) Promoted; (R) Relegated

== Results ==
Home \ Away	PCE	BRN	ZIZ	DUK	HRK	JIH	UNL	CHR	LIS	PRO	VYS	TRI	VLA	VDF	SOK	VIT
Pardubice	—	1–2	2–1	3–1	0–0	2–1	5–0	4–0	2–0	1–0	4–1	1–0	1–0	2–0	4–0	2–1
Zbrojovka Brno	1–1	—	6–1	0–0	2–1	5–2	2–2	3–2	2–0	5–0	4–1	5–0	4–0	4–1	1–0	1–0
Viktoria Žižkov	2–1	1–0	—	5–2	1–2	1–1	2–1	0–1	2–1	0–0	1–0	3–1	0–1	3–0	2–1	2–0
Dukla Prague	0–1	2–1	2–0	—	1–2	2–1	3–2	3–0	4–2	1–0	2–0	2–3	4–0	2–1	3–1	4–0
Hradec Králové	1–0	1–1	5–0	0–2	—	4–2	1–0	2–0	1–1	1–2	1–0	2–2	1–0	8–0	2–0	3–0
Vysočina Jihlava	3–2	3–2	0–1	1–0	1–1	—	2–3	4–2	3–2	3–2	4–0	2–0	4–1	1–2	3–1	3–0
Ústí nad Labem	0–1	1–2	1–0	3–2	2–0	0–0	—	2–0	0–0	3–1	1–2	3–3	2–0	2–3	2–2	1–1
Chrudim	1–3	1–4	0–3	3–2	2–2	4–3	3–3	—	1–3	1–1	3–2	1–0	1–1	5–2	1–0	3–1
Líšeň	1–1	1–2	3–3	2–3	3–3	1–1	1–3	2–0	—	3–0	0–0	6–2	0–2	2–2	1–3	5–1
Prostějov	0–0	0–0	2–1	2–3	2–1	1–1	1–1	1–1	0–1	—	1–0	2–2	0–1	3–2	1–0	4–1
Slavoj Vyšehrad	0–2	2–7	0–0	1–3	2–0	1–1	4–1	1–3	1–1	3–1	—	1–2	2–1	3–1	2–1	4–1
Fotbal Třinec	0–1	1–1	4–2	1–2	1–1	0–1	0–1	1–0	1–1	0–0	1–2	—	1–2	1–1	2–1	3–2
Vlašim	0–1	2–2	2–1	2–0	0–2	2–3	0–1	2–1	1–2	2–0	1–1	0–2	—	2–1	1–1	2–1
Varnsdorf	1–2	0–1	0–4	1–1	1–2	2–1	0–3	3–3	0–0	1–3	2–2	2–2	2–1	—	3–0	3–1
Baník Sokolov	1–2	0–2	1–2	2–3	0–0	1–3	3–1	3–0	1–2	1–1	1–0	2–2	2–1	1–0	—	4–0
Vítkovice	1–3	2–3	0–1	0–3	1–4	1–1	3–1	0–1	2–2	2–2	4–2	5–2	0–2	0–0	4–0	—

Legend: Blue = home team win; Yellow = draw; Red = away team win.

== Top scorers ==
Rank	Player	Club	Goals
1	(Czech Republic) Stanislav Klobása	Jihlava	17
2	(Czech Republic) Lukáš Matějka	Ústí nad Labem	16
3	(Czech Republic) Michal Hlavatý	Pardubice	14
4	(Czech Republic) Adam Vlkanova	Hradec Králové	13
4	(Czech Republic) Tomáš Čvančara	Vyšehrad	13
6	(Czech Republic) Antonín Růsek	Brno	12
7	(Czech Republic) Jakub Přichystal	Brno	11
7	(Czech Republic) Jan Hladík	Brno	11
7	(Czech Republic) Lukáš Holík	Dukla	11
10	(France) Youba Dramé	Ústí nad Labem	10
