= Michal Jeřábek (footballer, born 1995) =

Czech footballer (born 1995)

Personal information
- Date of birth: 7 February 1995 (age 31)
- Place of birth: Vyškov, Czech Republic
- Height: 1.78 m (5 ft 10 in)
- Position: Centre-back

Team information
- Current team: Artis Brno
- Number: 5

Youth career
- 2001–2004: TJ Dražovice
- 2004–2007: Drnovice
- 2007–2014: Vyškov

Senior career*
Years	Team	Apps	(Gls)
2014–2019	Vyškov	138	(14)
2019–	Artis Brno	183	(11)
- * Club domestic league appearances and goals as of 24 May 2026

Michal Jeřábek (born 7 February 1995) is a Czech professional footballer who plays as a centre-back for Czech First League club Artis Brno.
