= Jan Hlavica =

Czech footballer

Personal information
- Date of birth: 17 July 1994 (age 32)
- Place of birth: Kelč, Czech Republic
- Height: 1.85 m (6 ft 1 in)
- Position: Centre-back

Youth career
- 2000–2006: TJ Kelč
- 2006–2008: SK Hranice
- 2008–2013: Sigma Olomouc

Senior career*
Years	Team	Apps	(Gls)
2013–2017	Sigma Olomouc	0	(0)
2013	→ Sulko Zábřeh (loan)	2	(0)
2014–2015	→ HFK Olomouc (loan)	24	(2)
2016	→ MFK Vítkovice (loan)	3	(0)
2015–2017	→ Florida Tech Panthers (loan)	45	(5)
2017–2018	Vyškov	13	(1)
2018–2020	Líšeň	68	(2)
2020–2023	Zbrojovka Brno	55	(0)
2023–2024	Podbeskidzie	21	(0)
- * Club domestic league appearances and goals as of 28 May 2024

Jan Hlavica (born 17 July 1994) is a Czech professional footballer who plays as a centre-back.
