= Jan Sedlák =

Czech footballer

Personal information
- Full name: Jan Sedlák
- Date of birth: 25 October 1994 (age 32)
- Place of birth: Blansko, Czech Republic
- Height: 1.80 m (5 ft 11 in)
- Position: Defensive midfielder

Team information
- Current team: Artis Brno

Youth career
- 2002–2007: SK Sokol Lipovec
- 2007–2010: FK Apos Blansko
- 2010–2013: Zbrojovka Brno

Senior career*
Years	Team	Apps	(Gls)
2013–2021	Zbrojovka Brno	104	(0)
2013–2015	→ Líšeň (loan)	9	(1)
2015–2016	→ Karviná (loan)	23	(2)
2021–2023	Sigma Olomouc	26	(1)
2023–2024	Ruch Chorzów	18	(0)
2024–	Artis Brno	39	(1)
- * Club domestic league appearances and goals as of 24 May 2026

Jan Sedlák (born 25 October 1994) is a Czech professional footballer who plays as a defensive midfielder for Czech First League club Artis Brno.
