= Marek Mach (footballer) =

Czech footballer

Personal information
- Full name: Marek Mach
- Date of birth: 30 August 2000 (age 26)
- Place of birth: Brno, Czech Republic
- Height: 1.81 m (5 ft 11 in)
- Position: Midfielder

Team information
- Current team: Hanácká Slavia Kroměříž
- Number: 50

Youth career
- 2006−2008: TJ Velešovice
- 2008–2019: Zbrojovka Brno

Senior career*
Years	Team	Apps	(Gls)
2019−2020	Zbrojovka Brno	7	(0)
2021	Blansko	21	(4)
2022	Zbrojovka Brno	0	(0)
2022−2024	Prostějov	25	(1)
2024−2026	Artis Brno	28	(1)
2026	→ Hanácká Slavia Kroměříž (loan)	12	(0)
2026−	Hanácká Slavia Kroměříž	0	(0)

International career^{‡}
2016	Czech Republic U-16	1	(0)
2018	Czech Republic U-18	1	(0)
- * Club domestic league appearances and goals as of 28 May 2026 ‡ National team caps and goals as of 3 August 2019

Marek Mach (born 30 August 2000) is a Czech footballer who currently plays as a midfielder for Czech National Football League club Hanácká Slavia Kroměříž.

== Club career ==
=== Zbrojovka Brno ===
He made his professional debut for Zbrojovka Brno in the season opening match against Vlašim on 19 July 2019, which ended in a draw 2:2. He was in the starting line-up, after 73 minutes he was replaced by Robert Bartolomeu.

=== Hanácká Slavia Kroměříž ===
On 5 August 2026, Mach signed a contract with Czech National Football League club Hanácká Slavia Kroměříž.
