= Martin Zikl =

Czech footballer

Personal information
- Full name: Martin Zikl
- Date of birth: 13 June 1999 (age 27)
- Place of birth: Brno, Czech Republic
- Height: 1.88 m (6 ft 2 in)
- Position: Forward

Team information
- Current team: SK Líšeň
- Number: 15

Youth career
- 2006−2012: ČAFC Židenice
- 2012−2017: FC Zbrojovka Brno

Senior career*
| Years | Team | Apps | (Gls) |
| 2017−2021 | FC Zbrojovka Brno | 26 | (3) |
| 2019−2020 | → SK Líšeň (loan) | 24 | (7) |
| 2020 | → 1. SK Prostějov (loan) | 12 | (2) |
| 2021 | → SK Líšeň (loan) | 13 | (2) |
| 2021− | SK Líšeň | 46 | (4) |

International career^{‡}
| 2014–2015 | Czech Republic U16 | 11 | (3) |
| 2015–2016 | Czech Republic U17 | 13 | (1) |
| 2019 | Czech Republic U20 | 4 | (0) |
- * Club domestic league appearances and goals as of 19 June 2023 ‡ National team caps and goals as of 31 May 2020

Martin Zikl (born 13 June 1999) is a Czech footballer who currently plays as a forward for SK Líšeň.

== Club career ==
=== FC Zbrojovka Brno ===
He made his professional debut for Zbrojovka Brno in the home match against Teplice on 18 November 2017, which ended in a win 1–0. Zikl scored his first Zbrojovka goal in the home game against Zlín on 2 December 2017 that ended in a draw 1–1.
