= Dominik Kříž =

Czech footballer

Personal information
- Date of birth: 25 September 1999 (age 27)
- Place of birth: Czech Republic
- Height: 1.77 m (5 ft 10 in)
- Position: Midfielder

Team information
- Current team: Hanácká Slavia Kroměříž
- Number: 80

Youth career
- 2006−2007: Slovan Rosice
- 2007–2010: TJ Tatran Bohunice
- 2010–2018: Zbrojovka Brno

Senior career*
Years	Team	Apps	(Gls)
2018–2020	Zbrojovka Brno	13	(1)
2019	→ Líšeň (loan)	1	(0)
2019–2020	→ Příbram (loan)	10	(0)
2020–2021	Slavoj Vyšehrad	22	(1)
2021–	Viktoria Plzeň	0	(0)
2021	→ Sereď (loan)	9	(0)
2022–2024	→ Varnsdorf (loan)	43	(1)
2024–	Hanácká Slavia Kroměříž	59	(11)

International career
2016	Czech Republic U17	2	(0)
- * Club domestic league appearances and goals as of 28 May 2026

Dominik Kříž (born 25 September 1999) is a Czech footballer who plays as a midfielder for SK Hanácká Slavia Kroměříž.

== Club career ==
=== FC Zbrojovka Brno ===
He made his professional debut for Zbrojovka Brno in the home match against Jihlava on 22 July 2018, which ended in a loss 1:3.
