= Youba Dramé =

French footballer (born 1998)

Personal information
- Date of birth: 16 January 1998 (age 28)
- Place of birth: Béziers, France
- Height: 1.85 m (6 ft 1 in)
- Position: Forward

Team information
- Current team: Egnatia
- Number: 7

Youth career
- –2015: AS Béziers Hérault

Senior career*
Years	Team	Apps	(Gls)
2015–2017	Agde		
2018–2020	Ústí nad Labem	37	(11)
2020–2023	Zlín	106	(10)
2024–	Egnatia	13	(0)
- * Club domestic league appearances and goals as of 1 June 2024

Youba Dramé (born 16 January 1998) is a French professional footballer who plays as a forward for Egnatia.

== Club career ==
Dramé started playing senior football at RC Agde, which played lower amateur competitions in France. His first professional engagement was with Ústí nad Labem in the Czech National Football League, where he arrived at the beginning of 2018. After scoring 10 goals in 26 matches in the 2019–20 season, he transferred to FC Zlín in the Czech First League. In the following seasons, he played over 100 matches for Zlín. He left Zlín after his contract expired at the end of 2023.

== Family ==
His cousin Soufiane Dramé is also a professional footballer. He also played in the Czech First League.

== Honours ==
Egnatia

- Albanian Cup: 2023–24
