= Rudolf Reiter =

Czech footballer

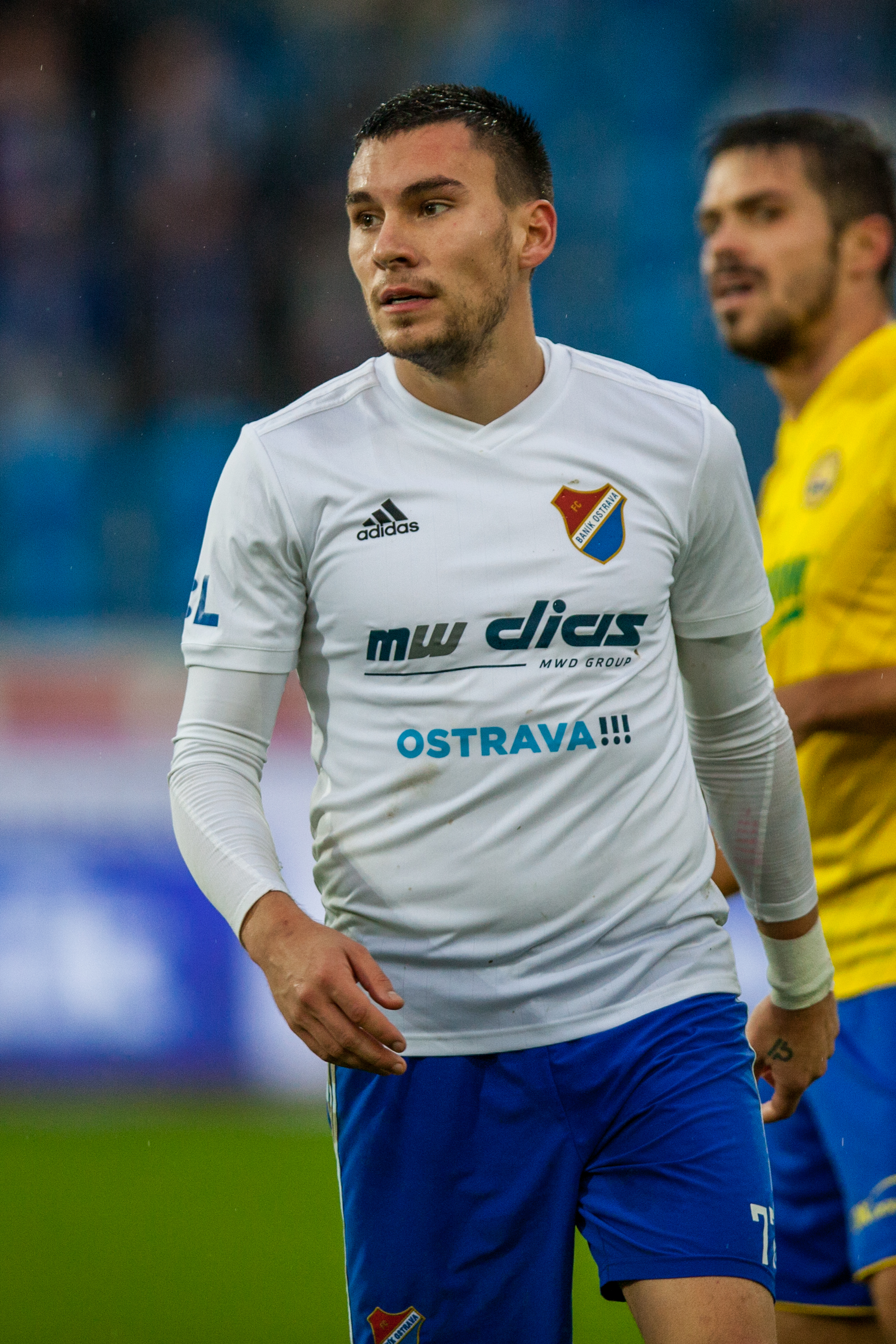
- Rudolf Reiter playing for FC Baník Ostrava

Personal information
- Full name: Rudolf Reiter
- Date of birth: 28 September 1994 (age 32)
- Place of birth: Prague, Czech Republic
- Height: 1.80 m (5 ft 11 in)
- Position: Winger

Team information
- Current team: Viktoria Žižkov
- Number: 7

Youth career
- 2001–2014: Sparta Prague

Senior career*
Years	Team	Apps	(Gls)
2014–2018	Sparta Prague	0	(0)
2014–2015	→ Viktoria Žižkov (loan)	7	(0)
2015–2017	→ Vlašim (loan)	33	(1)
2017–2018	→ Bohemians 1905 (loan)	28	(3)
2018–2019	Bohemians 1905	31	(1)
2019–2023	Baník Ostrava	33	(1)
2020–2021	→ Zbrojovka Brno (loan)	15	(0)
2021–2023	→ Trinity Zlín (loan)	42	(2)
2023–2025	Trinity Zlín	29	(0)
2025–	Viktoria Žižkov	23	(1)
- * Club domestic league appearances and goals as of 28 May 2026

Rudolf Reiter (born 28 September 1994) is a Czech professional footballer who plays for Viktoria Žižkov.
