= Jakub Černín =

Czech footballer (born 1999)

Personal information
- Full name: Jakub Černín
- Date of birth: 8 February 1999 (age 27)
- Place of birth: Břeclav, Czech Republic
- Height: 1.99 m (6 ft 6 in)
- Position: Centre back

Team information
- Current team: Zlín
- Number: 24

Youth career
- 2006−2009: Moravan Lednice
- 2009–2014: Břeclav
- 2014–2018: Zbrojovka Brno

Senior career*
Years	Team	Apps	(Gls)
2018−2022	Zbrojovka Brno	10	(1)
2018−2019	→ Líšeň (loan)	27	(0)
2020	→ Líšeň (loan)	7	(0)
2021–	→ Blansko (loan)	11	(0)
2022−2023	Líšeň	43	(7)
2023−	Zlín	78	(11)

International career
2016	Czech Republic U-17	2	(1)
- * Club domestic league appearances and goals as of 27 May 2026

Jakub Černín (born 8 February 1999) is a Czech footballer who currently plays as a centre back for Zlín.

== Club career ==
=== Líšeň ===
He spend entire 2018–19 season on one-year loan in SK Líšeň and celebrated promotion into Czech National Football League.

=== Zbrojovka Brno ===
He made his professional debut for Zbrojovka Brno in the away match against Třinec on 31 August 2019, which ended in a draw 1:1. He came to the pitch as a substitute in 54th minute and after 10 minutes he scored his premiere goal and helped his team to equalise.

=== Zlín ===
On 28 July 2023, Černín signed a three-and-a-half-year contract with Czech First League club FC Zlín.
