= Šimon Šumbera =

Czech footballer

Personal information
- Date of birth: 5 January 1991 (age 35)
- Place of birth: Zlín, Czechoslovakia
- Height: 1.79 m (5 ft 10 1/2 in)
- Position: Midfielder

Team information
- Current team: SK Líšeň

Youth career
- 1998–2009: FC Fastav Zlín

Senior career*
Years	Team	Apps	(Gls)
2009–2013	FC Fastav Zlín "B"	53	(6)
2011–2013	FC Fastav Zlín	4	(1)
2014–2015	FC Zbrojovka Brno	17	(1)
2015–2017	1. SC Znojmo	40	(10)
2017–2018	Fotbal Třinec	58	(11)
2019–2021	FC Zbrojovka Brno	58	(6)
2021	Senica	18	(3)
2022–	Líšeň	33	(1)
2022	→ Prostějov (loan)	11	(1)
- * Club domestic league appearances and goals as of 19 June 2023

Šimon Šumbera (born 5 January 1991) is a Czech professional footballer who plays for SK Líšeň.
