= Ondřej Pachlopník =

Czech footballer

Personal information
- Full name: Ondřej Pachlopník
- Date of birth: 14 February 2000 (age 26)
- Place of birth: Brno, Czech Republic
- Height: 1.79 m (5 ft 10 in)
- Position: Midfielder

Team information
- Current team: Zbrojovka Brno
- Number: 7

Youth career
- 2006−2010: TJ Tatran Bohunice
- 2010–2019: Zbrojovka Brno

Senior career*
Years	Team	Apps	(Gls)
2019−	Zbrojovka Brno	79	(7)
2021−2022	→ Viktoria Plzeň (loan)	0	(0)

International career^{‡}
2015–2016	Czech Republic U-16	4	(0)
2018	Czech Republic U-18	2	(0)
2018	Czech Republic U-19	7	(2)
2022−	Czech Republic U-21	1	(0)
- * Club domestic league appearances and goals as of 15 June 2025 ‡ National team caps and goals as of 16 February 2023

Ondřej Pachlopník (born 14 February 2000) is a Czech footballer who currently plays as a midfielder for FC Zbrojovka Brno.

== Club career ==
=== FC Zbrojovka Brno ===
He made his professional debut for Zbrojovka Brno in the away match against Chrudim on 2 February 2019, which ended in a win 2:1. He came to the pitch as a substitute in 71st minute and helped his team to win 2:1, although Zbrojovka played in one man less.
