= Slavkov (Uherské Hradiště District) =

- Municipality
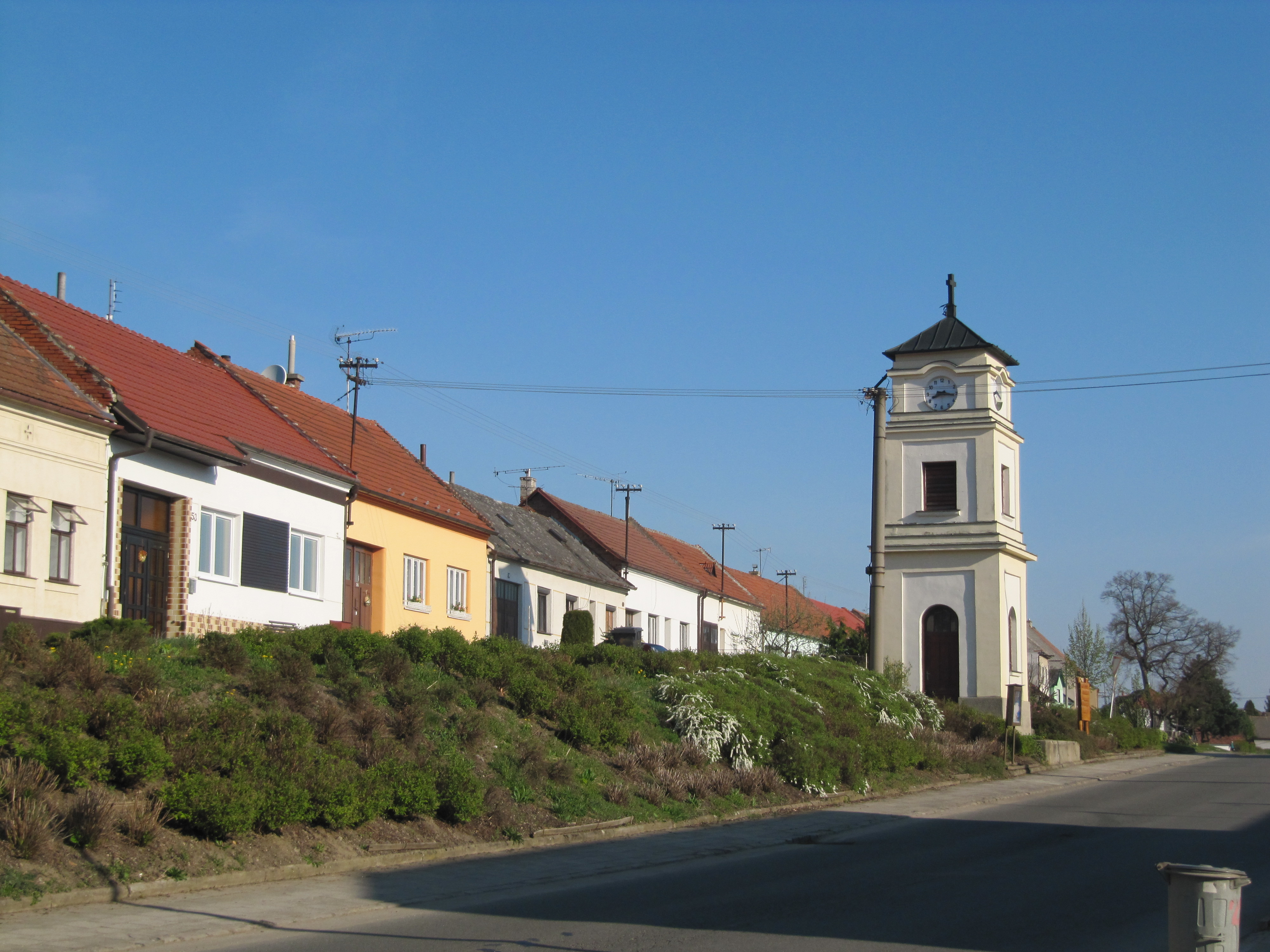
- Centre with a belfry

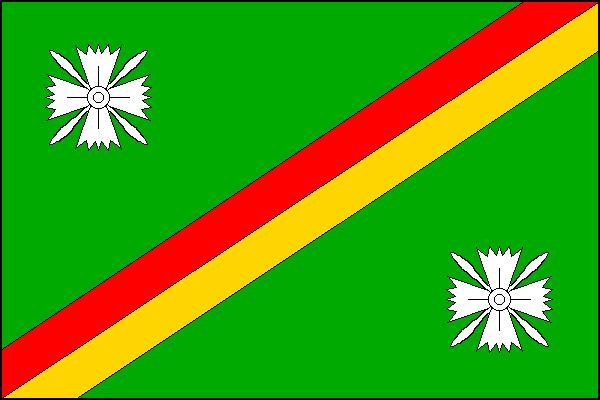
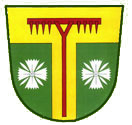
- Flag Coat of arms

- Location in the Czech Republic
- Coordinates: 48°56′49″N 17°36′42″E
- Country: Czech Republic
- Region: Zlín
- District: Uherské Hradiště
- First mentioned: 1261

Area
  - Total: 13.76 km^{2} (5.31 sq mi)
- Elevation: 302 m (991 ft)

Population (2026-01-01)
  - Total: 696
  - Density: 50.6/km^{2} (131/sq mi)
- Time zone: UTC+1 (CET)
  - Summer (DST): UTC+2 (CEST)
- Postal code: 687 64
- Website: www.obecslavkov.cz

Slavkov is a municipality and village in Uherské Hradiště District in the Zlín Region of the Czech Republic. It has about 700 inhabitants.

Slavkov lies approximately 18 kilometres (11 mi) south-east of Uherské Hradiště, 33 km (21 mi) south of Zlín, and 264 km (164 mi) south-east of Prague.

== Demographics ==
Historical population
Year	Pop.	±%
1869	595	—
1880	635	+6.7%
1890	696	+9.6%
1900	744	+6.9%
1910	828	+11.3%
1921	848	+2.4%
1930	824	−2.8%
1950	732	−11.2%
1961	871	+19.0%
1970	816	−6.3%
1980	744	−8.8%
1991	659	−11.4%
2001	678	+2.9%
2011	672	−0.9%
2021	671	−0.1%
Source: Censuses
