= Zastávka =

- Municipality
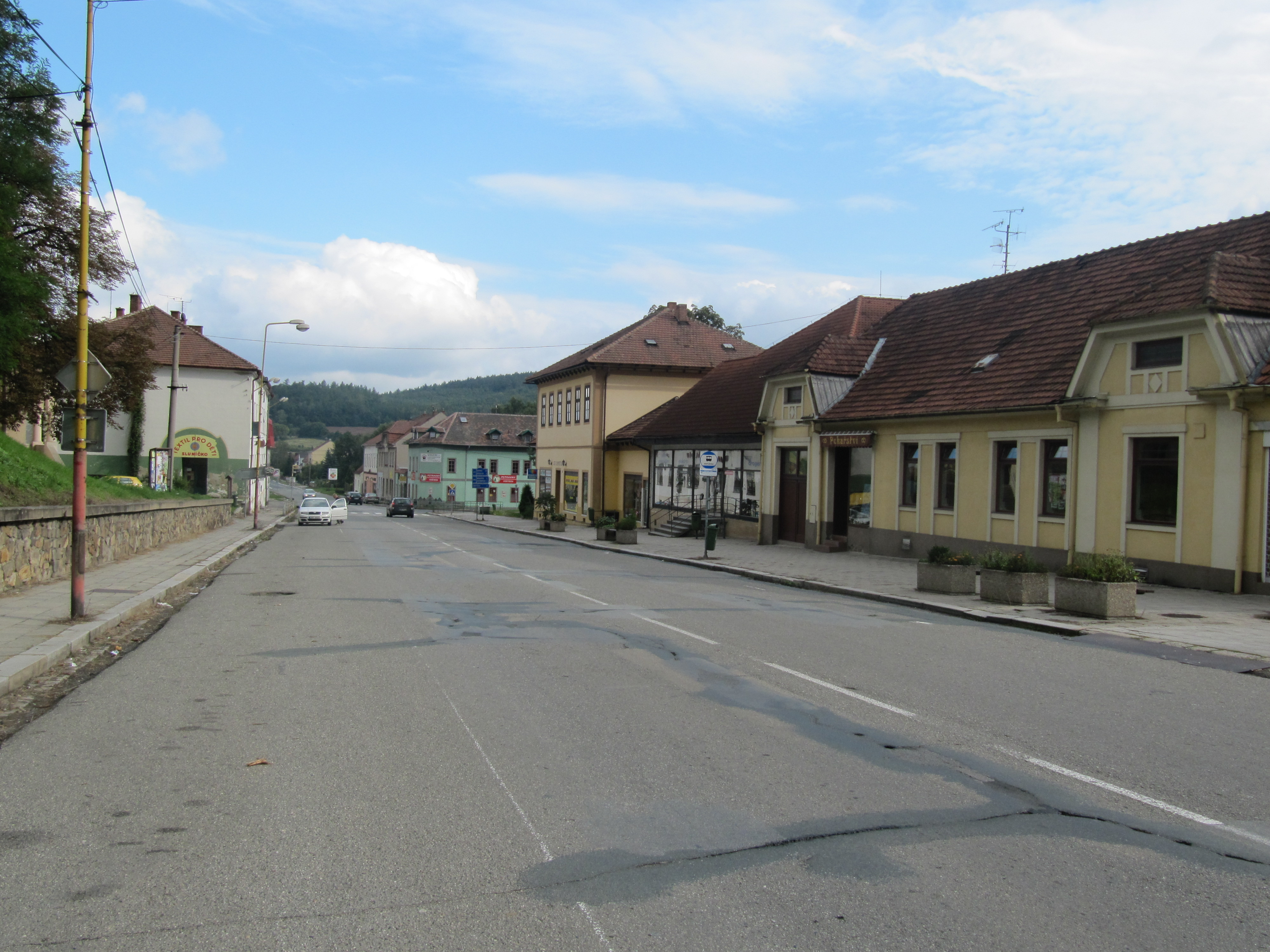
- Main street

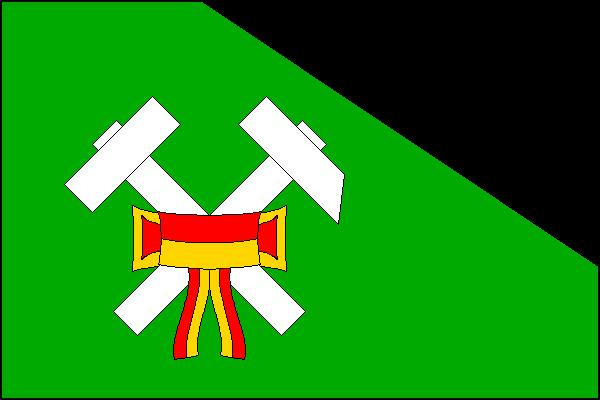
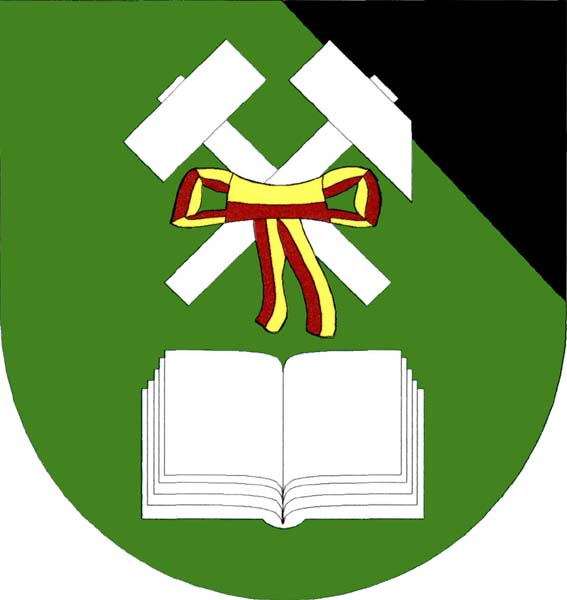
- Flag Coat of arms

- Location in the Czech Republic
- Coordinates: 49°11′17″N 16°21′47″E
- Country: Czech Republic
- Region: South Moravian
- District: Brno-Country
- Established: 1875

Area
  - Total: 1.20 km^{2} (0.46 sq mi)
- Elevation: 318 m (1,043 ft)

Population (2026-01-01)
  - Total: 2,483
  - Density: 2,070/km^{2} (5,360/sq mi)
- Time zone: UTC+1 (CET)
  - Summer (DST): UTC+2 (CEST)
- Postal code: 664 84
- Website: www.zastavka.cz

Zastávka is a municipality and village in Brno-Country District in the South Moravian Region of the Czech Republic. It has about 2,500 inhabitants.

== Etymology ==
The word zastávka means 'stop' or 'station' in Czech. The name of the village refers to an inn of that name that once stood here.

== Geography ==
Zastávka is located about 17 kilometres (11 mi) west of Brno. It lies on the border between the Křižanov Highlands and Boskovice Furrow. The Habřina stream flows through the municipality. Almost the entire area of the small municipal territory is built up.

== History ==
The first written mention of the name Zastávka is from 1775, when there was an inn, but the village did not exist yet. The village was founded as a result of black coal mining, which began here in 1788 and lasted for 180 years. The municipality was established in 1875 and originally named Boží Požehnání ('God's blessing') after the mine. Since 1920, it has been named Zastávka.

== Demographics ==
Historical population

| Year | Pop. | ±% |
|---|---|---|
| 1869 | – | — |
| 1880 | 1,145 | — |
| 1890 | 1,496 | +30.7% |
| 1900 | 1,539 | +2.9% |
| 1910 | 1,493 | −3.0% |

| Year | Pop. | ±% |
|---|---|---|
| 1921 | 1,630 | +9.2% |
| 1930 | 1,761 | +8.0% |
| 1950 | 1,872 | +6.3% |
| 1961 | 2,022 | +8.0% |
| 1970 | 2,434 | +20.4% |

| Year | Pop. | ±% |
|---|---|---|
| 1980 | 2,400 | −1.4% |
| 1991 | 2,228 | −7.2% |
| 2001 | 2,359 | +5.9% |
| 2011 | 2,465 | +4.5% |
| 2021 | 2,584 | +4.8% |

Source: Censuses

== Transport ==
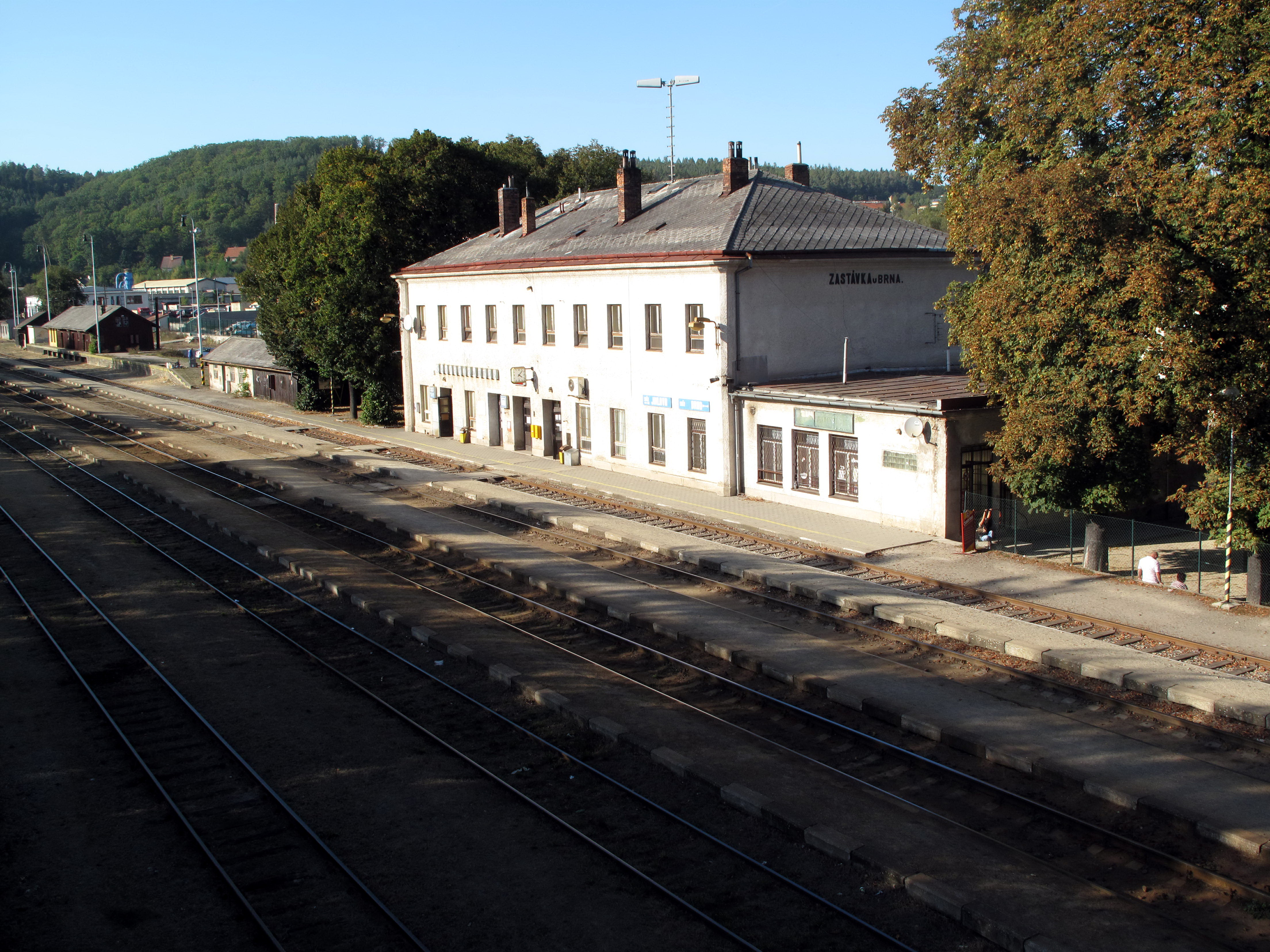
Train station

The I/23 road (the section from Brno to Třebíč) runs through the municipality.

Zastávka is located on the railway line Brno–Třebíč.

== Sights ==
There are no protected cultural monuments in the municipality. The main landmark is the Chapel of Saint John the Baptist that dates from 1911.
