= 2025–26 Czech National Football League =

Czech National Football League
- Season: 2025–26
- Dates: 19 July 2025 – 23 May 2025
- Promoted: Zbrojovka
- Relegated: Sparta B, SK Dynamo, MFK Chrudim
- Matches: 240
- Goals: 643 (2.68 per match)
- Top goalscorer: Quadri Adediran (17 goals)
- Biggest home win: Slavia B 6–1 Č. Budějovice; 3 August 2025; Ostrava B 5–0 Artis; 3 August 2025; Vlašim 5–0 Kroměříž; 3 August 2025; Slavia B 5–0 Chrudim; 31 August 2025; Artis 5–0 Sparta B 13 September 2025; Táborsko 6–1 Žižkov; 4 October 2025; Vlašim 7–2 Ústí nad Labem; 9 November 2025; Chrudim 6–1 Slavia B 10 April 2026; Kroměříž 5–0 Slavia B 6 May 2026
- Biggest away win: Příbram 2–7 Zbrojovka; 30 July 2025
- Highest scoring: Příbram 2–7 Zbrojovka; 30 July 2025; Vlašim 7–2 Ústí nad Labem; 9 November 2025
- All statistics correct as of complete.

The 2025–26 Czech National Football League (known as the Chance Národní Liga for sponsorship reasons) was the 33rd season of the Czech Republic's second tier football league. The season started on 19 July 2025.

== Format ==
Starting with the 2024–25 season, the league is called "Chance Národní Liga" after its new main sponsor, Chance betting office. The season format was unchanged from last season. Each team played in the league format home and away matches. The top-ranked team was promoted to the Czech First League, the two teams positioned 2nd and 3rd played a play-out with two teams from the first league positioned 14th and 15th in a home and away format.

The two lowest-ranked teams were to be relegated directly to the third tier. However, after failing to obtain a license for professional competition, Dynamo České Budějovice and Chrudim were administratively relegated after the season and the 15th-placed team Vysočina Jihlava was spared from relegation.

== Team changes ==
SK Líšeň, playing in the Czech National Football League since 2019, was rebranded. After the 2024–25 season, the club changed its name to SK Artis Brno and moved within the city of Brno from the district of Líšeň to Královo Pole.

MFK Vyškov competed in the Czech National Football League from 2021 to 2025, but the club does not have a stadium that would allow it to play professional league matches, so it decided to play only in lower amateur tiers from 2025 and sold its place in the league to FK Příbram.

Team changes for sporting reasons included SK Dynamo České Budějovice joining the league after being relegated from the previous season's First League, while last season's champions FC Zlín changed places with them.

Looking downwards, relegated teams SK Sigma Olomouc B and FK Varnsdorf were replaced by winners of the third tier leagues: Ústí nad Labem, who won the Bohemian Football League, and Kroměříž, who won the Moravian-Silesian Football League.

=== From CNFL ===
- FC Zlín (promoted to 2025–26 Czech First League)
- SK Sigma Olomouc B (relegated to Moravian-Silesian Football League)
- FK Varnsdorf (relegated to Bohemian Football League)
- MFK Vyškov (sold the league license to FK Příbram)

=== To CNFL ===
- SK Dynamo České Budějovice (relegated from 2024–25 Czech First League)
- FK Viagem Ústí nad Labem (promoted from 2024–25 Bohemian Football League)
- SK Hanácká Slavia Kroměříž (promoted from 2024–25 Moravian-Silesian Football League)
- FK Příbram (bought the league license from MFK Vyškov)

== Team overview ==
Location of clubs in the 2025–26 league

=== Locations and stadiums ===
Club	Location	Stadium	Capacity	2024–25 position
SK Dynamo České Budějovice	České Budějovice	Stadion Střelecký ostrov	6,681	16th in First League
MFK Chrudim	Chrudim	Za Vodojemem	1,500	2nd
FC Silon Táborsko	Tábor	Stadion v Kvapilově ulici	1,500	4th
AC Sparta Prague B	Prague	eFotbal Arena	2,799	5th
FC Sellier & Bellot Vlašim	Vlašim	Stadion Kollárova ulice	3,000	6th
FC Zbrojovka Brno	Brno	Městský fotbalový stadion Srbská	10,200	7th
SK Artis Brno	Brno	Městský fotbalový stadion Srbská	10,200	8th
FK Viktoria Žižkov	Prague	eFotbal Arena	2,799	9th
FC Vysočina Jihlava	Jihlava	Stadion v Jiráskově ulici	4,500	10th
SK Slavia Prague B	Prague	Stadion Olympia Radotín	1,500	11th
1. SK Prostějov	Prostějov	Stadion Za Místním nádražím	3,500	12th
SFC Opava	Opava	Stadion v Městských sadech	7,524	13th
FC Baník Ostrava B	Ostrava	Městský stadion (Ostrava)	15,123	14th
FK Viagem Ústí nad Labem	Ústí nad Labem	Městský stadion	4,000	1st in ČFL
SK Hanácká Slavia Kroměříž	Kroměříž	Stadion Jožky Silného	1,529	1st in MSFL
FK Příbram	Příbram	Na Litavce	9,100	2nd in ČFL Group A

== League table ==
Pos	Team	Pld	W	D	L	GF	GA	GD	Pts	Promotion or relegation
1	Zbrojovka Brno (C, P)	30	24	4	2	62	22	+40	76	Promotion to 2026–27 Czech First League
2	Táborsko (Q)	30	16	5	9	48	32	+16	53	Qualification for promotion play-offs
3	Artis Brno (Note: On 15 June 2026, MFK Karviná was administratively relegated from the Czech First League due to alleged match-fixing. The club left the Czech First League after withdrawing the initial appeal on 28 June 2026. Because the 2025–26 season was officially concluded on 22 June, the Karviná's place in the league was preferentially offered to the Czech National Football League's last season best teams. After FC Silon Táborsko rejected the offer, Karviná was replaced by SK Artis Brno.) (Q, P)	30	15	7	8	50	37	+13	52	Qualification for promotion play-offs
4	Ústí nad Labem	30	15	3	12	53	46	+7	48	
5	Baník Ostrava B	30	14	5	11	45	38	+7	47	
6	Příbram	30	13	7	10	29	30	−1	46	
7	Opava	30	11	11	8	42	31	+11	44	
8	Viktoria Žižkov	30	12	5	13	38	52	−14	41	
9	Vlašim	30	10	8	12	41	34	+7	38	
10	Slavia Prague B	30	11	5	14	42	47	−5	38	
11	Chrudim (Note: Chrudim and Dynamo České Budějovice were both administratively relegated to the 2026–27 ČFL after failing to obtain a license for the upcoming Czech National Football League season, sparing Vysočina Jihlava from relegation.) (R)	30	9	8	13	38	50	−12	35	Relegation to 2026–27 ČFL
12	Hanácká Slavia Kroměříž	30	10	4	16	32	43	−11	34	
13	Dynamo České Budějovice (R)	30	10	4	16	31	43	−12	34	Relegation to 2026–27 ČFL
14	Prostějov	30	6	12	12	32	44	−12	30	
15	Vysočina Jihlava	30	7	8	15	32	39	−7	29	Spared from relegation
16	Sparta Prague B (R)	30	7	4	19	27	54	−27	25	Relegation to 2026–27 ČFL

Source: Chance Národní Liga
Rules for classification: 1) Points; 2) Head-to-head points; 3) Head-to-head goal difference; 4) Head-to-head goals scored; 5) Goal difference; 6) Goals scored; 7) Play-off (if deciding promotion or relegation); 8) Draw
(C) Champions; (P) Promoted; (Q) Qualified for the phase indicated; (R) Relegated

== Results ==
Home \ Away	ART	CBU	CHR	JIH	KRO	OPA	OSB	PRI	PRO	SLB	SPB	TAB	UST	VLA	ZBR	ZIZ
Artis Brno		2–1	0–0	0–3	2–1	3–3	1–0	0–2	3–1	2–1	5–0	1–1	1–3	1–3	2–2	5–1
Dynamo České Budějovice	0–2		1–2	3–1	1–0	0–1	2–2	2–0	1–0	2–0	2–1	1–2	1–2	0–0	0–2	0–2
Chrudim	2–1	0–4		1–1	2–1	0–2	3–1	2–0	2–2	6–1	2–2	0–3	1–1	0–2	0–1	3–2
Vysočina Jihlava	1–1	0–1	0–1		1–0	0–0	2–2	2–1	1–1	0–2	4–0	0–2	3–1	1–1	1–2	0–2
Hanácká Slavia Kroměříž	1–2	1–0	1–0	0–0		1–0	0–2	1–2	0–0	5–0	2–1	1–2	2–3	0–1	1–1	1–2
Opava	0–2	3–0	3–2	3–1	2–2		1–0	0–0	2–1	1–2	4–0	2–2	3–3	3–1	4–0	2–2
Baník Ostrava B	5–0	2–0	2–2	2–1	3–0	2–0		0–3	2–0	1–2	1–0	0–1	1–2	1–0	1–1	0–2
Příbram	1–0	2–1	1–1	1–1	0–2	0–1	2–0		0–0	1–0	2–0	0–3	2–1	0–0	2–7	1–0
Prostějov	1–1	1–1	3–1	0–3	3–1	0–0	1–3	0–0		2–3	1–2	2–1	2–1	1–1	1–2	2–2
Slavia Prague B	1–2	6–1	5–0	1–0	0–1	1–1	0–3	1–2	1–1		2–2	2–1	2–1	3–2	0–1	2–2
Sparta Prague B	1–3	0–1	2–3	0–2	1–0	0–0	0–1	0–1	5–1	1–0		1–3	0–2	0–1	0–3	2–0
Silon Táborsko	0–0	1–0	2–0	2–0	1–2	1–0	2–3	2–1	1–0	1–1	1–1		2–1	3–1	0–1	6–1
Ústí nad Labem	0–2	3–2	1–0	2–1	0–1	2–1	4–1	0–2	1–2	2–1	3–0	4–0		4–1	0–1	3–0
Vlašim	0–2	1–1	1–1	3–0	5–0	2–0	0–1	0–0	1–1	0–1	1–2	2–1	7–2		0–1	3–1
Zbrojovka Brno	2–0	4–1	2–0	2–1	5–2	0–0	4–1	1–0	1–2	2–1	3–0	2–1	3–0	1–0		1–0
Viktoria Žižkov	0–4	0–1	2–1	2–1	1–2	1–0	2–2	2–0	1–0	1–0	0–3	3–1	1–1	2–1	1–4	

Source: Chance Národní Liga
Legend: Blue = home team win; Yellow = draw; Red = away team win.

== Top scorers ==
Final standings

Rank	Player	Club	Goals
1	(Nigeria) Quadri Adediran	Artis	17
2	(Czech Republic) Lukáš Matějka	Táborsko	15
3	(Czech Republic) Tomáš Schánělec	Sparta B	11
3	(Czech Republic) Tadeáš Vachoušek	Zbrojovka	11
5	(Czech Republic) Antonín Vaníček	České Budějovice	10
6	(Czech Republic) David Černý	Ústí nad Labem	9
7	(Senegal) El Hadji Ndiaye	Opava	8
7	(Czech Republic) Tomáš Necid	Slavia B	8
7	(Belgium) Tyrese Omotoye	Jihlava	8
7	(Burundi) Bienvenue Kanakimana	Zbrojovka	8

== See also ==
- 2025–26 Czech First League
- 2025–26 Czech Cup
