= Antonín Růsek =

Czech footballer (born 1999)

- Růsek with Jablonec in 2026

Personal information
- Date of birth: 22 March 1999 (age 27)
- Place of birth: Brno, Czech Republic
- Height: 1.87 m (6 ft 2 in)
- Positions: Second striker; striker

Team information
- Current team: Jablonec
- Number: 16

Youth career
- −2016: Zbrojovka Brno

Senior career*
Years	Team	Apps	(Gls)
2016−2021	Zbrojovka Brno	83	(22)
2017	→ Znojmo (loan)	14	(5)
2021−2026	Sigma Olomouc	77	(14)
2025	→ Jablonec (loan)	0	(0)
2026−	Jablonec	0	(0)

International career^{‡}
2014–2015	Czech Republic U-16	14	(6)
2015–2016	Czech Republic U-17	11	(6)
2016−2017	Czech Republic U-18	18	(6)
2017−2018	Czech Republic U-19	16	(4)
2018−2019	Czech Republic U-20	8	(2)
2019−2020	Czech Republic U-21	2	(0)
2020−2022	Czech Republic	3	(0)
- * Club domestic league appearances and goals as of 27 May 2026 ‡ National team caps and goals as of 31 December 2022

Antonín Růsek (born 22 March 1999) is a Czech professional footballer who plays as a forward for Czech First League club Jablonec.

== Club career ==
=== Zbrojovka Brno ===
==== 2016–17 season ====
He made his professional debut for Zbrojovka Brno in the home match against Vysočina Jihlava on 29 October 2016, which ended in a draw 1:1. He assisted in equalizing goal by Michal Škoda in the 79th minute.

==== Loan to Znojmo ====
On 26 July 2017, he joined Czech 2. Liga side 1.SC Znojmo on the one-year loan.

=== Sigma Olomouc ===
==== Loan to Jablonec ====
On 8 September 2025, Růsek joined Jablonec on a one-year loan deal without an option.

=== Jablonec ===
On 19 July 2026, Růsek signed a multi-year contract with Jablonec.

=== International career ===
Růsek earned selection in September 2020, after several players dropped out of the initial squad due to the COVID-19 pandemic. He made his debut on 7 September 2020 in the home match against Scotland, which ended in a loss 1–2. The match took place in Andrův stadion in Olomouc and Růsek went on the pitch in the 80th minute. In 90th minute he hit the bar of David Marshall's goal after a fine header.

== Career statistics ==
=== International ===
As of 31 December 2022

Czech Republic
Year	Apps	Goals
2020	1	0
2021	0	0
2022	2	0
Total	3	0
