= SK Hanácká Slavia Kroměříž =

- Full name: Sportovní klub Hanácká Slavia Kroměříž
- Founded: 1919; 107 years ago
- Ground: Stadion Jožky Silného
- Capacity: 1,529 (700 seated)
- Chairman: Martin Bsonek
- Manager: Jindřich Tichai
- League: Czech National Football League
- 2025–26: 12th of 16
- Website: www.hanackaslavia.cz
Home colours

SK Hanácká Slavia Kroměříž (also abbreviated as SK HS Kroměříž) is a football club located in Kroměříž, Czech Republic. From 2025, it plays in the Czech National Football League.

In the 2004–05, 2005–06 and 2023–24 seasons, the club played in the Czech National Football League. After 16 seasons in the Moravian–Silesian Football League (third tier), it was promoted to the second tier in 2022–23. The club was relegated after one season, but in the following 2024–25 season, it was promoted back to the Czech National Football League.

== Historical names ==
Club logo until 2023

- 1919 – SK Hanácká Slavia Kroměříž (Sportovní klub Hanácká Slavia Kroměříž)
- 1941 – merger with SK Hanácká Sparta Kroměříž => name unchanged
- 1953 – DSO Spartak Kroměříž (Dobrovolná sportovní organisace Spartak Kroměříž)
- 1958 – TJ Slavia Kroměříž (Tělovýchovná jednota Slavia Kroměříž)
- 1991 – SK Hanácká Slavia Kroměříž (Sportovní klub Hanácká Slavia Kroměříž)

== Players ==
=== Current squad ===
As of 24 September 2026.

Note: Flags indicate national team as defined under FIFA eligibility rules; some limited exceptions apply. Players may hold more than one non-FIFA nationality.

No.	Pos.	Nation	Player
3	DF	CZE	Petr Zavadil
5	DF	SVK	Erik Otrísal (on loan from Artis Brno)
6	DF	CZE	Martin Kudela
8	MF	CZE	Daniel Polák (on loan from Zbrojovka Brno)
9	DF	CZE	Zdeněk Toman (on loan from Zbrojovka Brno)
13	FW	CZE	Daniel Hais (on loan from Hradec Králové)
16	MF	CZE	Radek Ovesný
17	FW	CZE	Jakub Dočkal
19	MF	CZE	Lukáš Holík
20	FW	CZE	Tadeáš Koryčan
23	MF	CZE	David Moučka
27	GK	CZE	Filip Mucha

No.	Pos.	Nation	Player
29	FW	CZE	Filip Žák
33	DF	SVK	Marek Hlinka
37	DF	CZE	Patrik Kulíšek
43	GK	CZE	Tomáš Vajner (on loan from Artis Brno)
44	DF	CZE	Zdeněk Říha
45	GK	CZE	Jakub Dostál
50	DF	CZE	Marek Mach
77	MF	CZE	Lucas Kubr (on loan from Hradec Králové)
80	MF	CZE	Dominik Kříž
91	DF	CZE	David Němeček
92	DF	CZE	Tomáš Čelůstka
99	MF	CZE	David Polášek (on loan from Zbrojovka Brno)

=== Out on loan ===
Note: Flags indicate national team as defined under FIFA eligibility rules; some limited exceptions apply. Players may hold more than one non-FIFA nationality.

No.	Pos.	Nation	Player
—	DF	SVK	Michal Mynář (at Považská Bystrica)

== Previous seasons ==
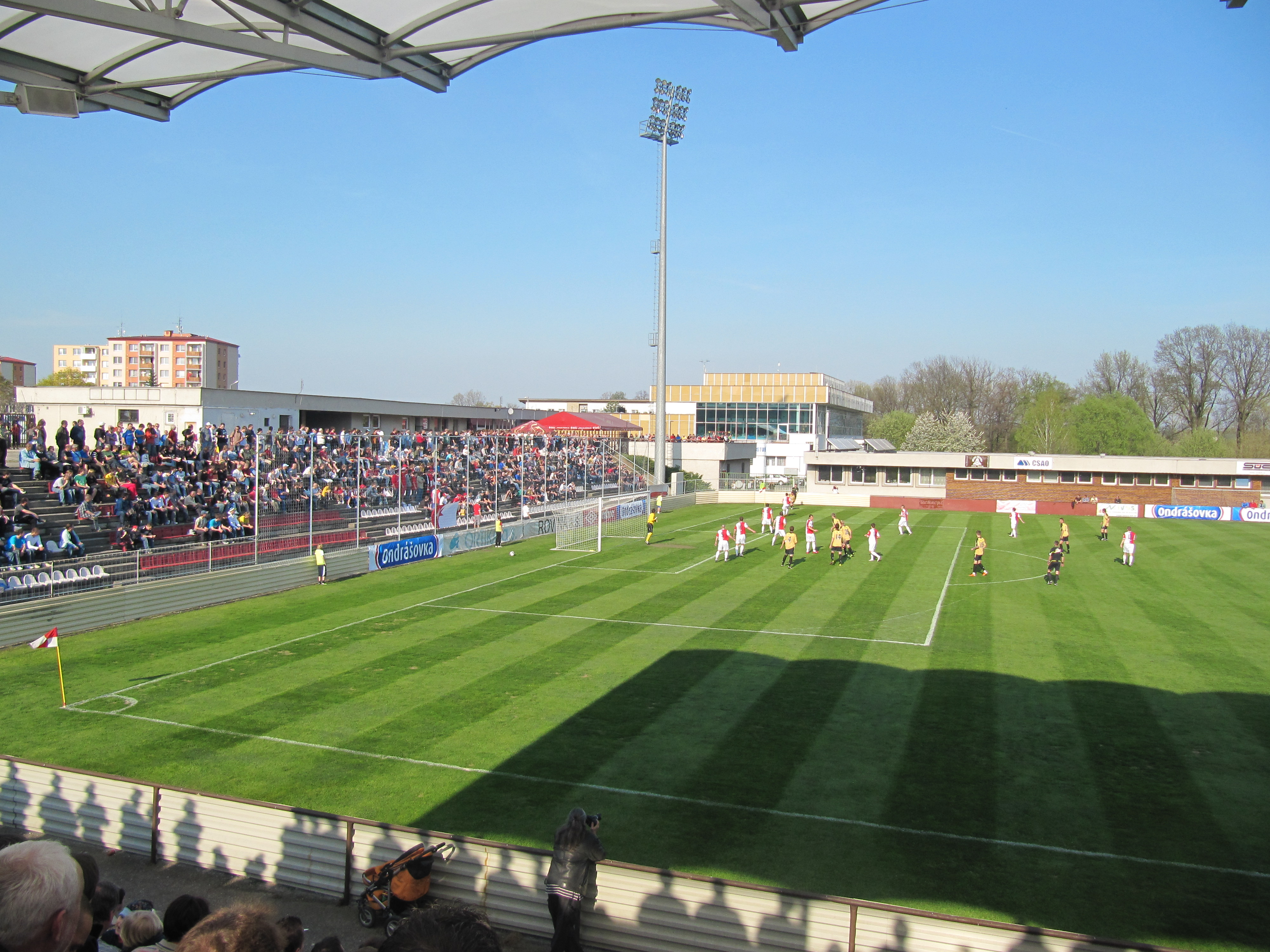
Czech Cup quarterfinal match against FC Zbrojovka Brno on 20 April 2011

- 2000–01: Divize D – 1st
- 2001–02: MSFL – 3rd
- 2002–03: MSFL – 8th
- 2003–04: MSFL – 1st
- 2004–05: 2. Liga – 13th
- 2005–06: 2. Liga – 8th
- 2006–07: Divize E – 1st
- 2007–08: MSFL – 12th
- 2008–09: MSFL – 5th
- 2009–10: MSFL – 10th
- 2010–11: MSFL – 4th
- 2011–12: MSFL – 15th
- 2012–13: MSFL – 13th
- 2013–14: MSFL – 14th
- 2014–15: MSFL – 2nd
- 2015–16: MSFL – 7th
- 2016–17: MSFL – 4th
- 2017–18: MSFL – 4th
- 2018–19: MSFL – 4th
- 2019–20: MSFL – 7th
- 2020–21: MSFL – 4th
- 2021–22: MSFL – 2nd
- 2022–23: MSFL – 1st
- 2023–24: 2. Liga – 16th
- 2024–25: MSFL – 1st
- 2025–26: 2. Liga – 12th

=== Czech Cup ===
While still playing at the third level of national competition, the club reached the semi-finals of the 2010–11 Czech Cup.

== Honours ==
- Moravian–Silesian Football League (third tier)
  - Champions: 2003–04, 2022–23, 2024–25
