= SK Artis Brno =

- Full name: Sportovní klub Artis Brno
- Founded: 1924; 102 years ago as SK ČSS Líšeň
- Ground: Městský fotbalový stadion Srbská
- Capacity: 10,200
- Chairman: Igor Fait
- Manager: Roman Nádvorník
- League: Czech First League
- 2025–26: Czech National Football League, 3rd of 16 (promoted)
- Website: artisbrno.cz
Home colours	Away colours

SK Artis Brno (until 2025 known as SK Líšeň) is a football club located in Brno, Czech Republic. After competing in the Czech National Football League from 2019 to 2026, the club was admitted to the Czech First League (Chance Liga) for the 2026–27 season following the administrative relegation of MFK Karviná.

== History ==
Club logo until 2025

In 2019, SK Líšeň was promoted to the Czech National Football League.

At the end of 2024, SK Líšeň was bought by the businessman Igor Fait. It was announced that after the 2024–25 season, the club will be renamed SK Artis Brno, will merge its academy with FC Svratka Brno, and will be moved to the Městský fotbalový stadion Srbská, which will be shared with FC Zbrojovka Brno. A new logo was also introduced.

After the 2025–26 season, the club was administratively moved to 2026–27 Czech First League following the administrative relegation of MFK Karviná. Artis Brno will play in Czech First League for the first time in their history.

=== Historical names ===
- 1924 — SK Československý socialista Líšeň
- 1936 — SK Líšeň
- 1948 — ZKL Líšeň
- 1951 — Spartak ZPS Líšeň
- 1958 — Spartak Líšeň
- 1990 — SK Líšeň
- 2020 — SK Líšeň 2019
- 2025 — SK Artis Brno

== Players ==
=== Current squad ===
As of 8 September 2026.

Note: Flags indicate national team as defined under FIFA eligibility rules; some limited exceptions apply. Players may hold more than one non-FIFA nationality.

No.	Pos.	Nation	Player
2	DF	CZE	Štěpán Harazim
4	DF	CZE	Dominik Plechatý
5	DF	CZE	Michal Jeřábek
6	FW	NGR	Quadri Adediran
7	FW	CMR	Alexis Alégué
8	MF	NED	Sacha Komljenovic
9	DF	CZE	Albert Labík
11	MF	MLI	Issa Fomba
12	FW	SEN	El Hadji Ndiaye
13	MF	CZE	Pavel Sokol
14	MF	CZE	Adam Petrák
15	DF	LBR	Emmanuel Fully (on loan from Slavia Prague)
16	DF	SRB	Danijel Kolarić
17	MF	CPV	Papalélé
18	MF	CIV	Ismael Sylla
19	FW	CZE	Daniel Toula
20	MF	POL	Dominik Sarapata (on loan from Copenhagen)
21	DF	SWE	Adam Carlén

No.	Pos.	Nation	Player
22	DF	CZE	Jakub Fulnek
23	DF	CZE	Milan Lutonský (Vice-captain)
24	DF	CZE	Ondřej Čoudek
26	MF	CZE	Martin Pospíšil (Captain)
27	DF	CZE	Dominik Preisler
28	DF	CZE	David Šimek
29	GK	CZE	Richard Kašík
30	MF	CZE	Jan Navrátil
31	GK	CZE	Jiří Borek
32	GK	CZE	Tadeáš Stoppen (on loan from Sigma Olomouc)
33	DF	FRA	Neil Glossoa (on loan from Slavia Prague)
34	DF	CZE	Karel Pojezný (on loan from Baník Ostrava)
36	MF	CZE	Sebastian Boháč
37	FW	CZE	Martin Tauš
77	MF	SRB	Vukadin Vukadinović
87	MF	MNE	Vladimir Perišić
90	MF	GAM	Youssoupha Sanyang (on loan from Slavia Prague)

=== Out on loan ===
Note: Flags indicate national team as defined under FIFA eligibility rules; some limited exceptions apply. Players may hold more than one non-FIFA nationality.

No.	Pos.	Nation	Player
—	GK	CZE	Tomáš Vajner (at Kroměříž)
—	DF	SVK	Erik Otrísal (at Kroměříž)

No.	Pos.	Nation	Player
—	MF	CZE	Daniel Samek (at Kladno)
—	FW	CZE	Daniel Švancara (at Petržalka)

== Managers ==
- Bohumil Smrček (2006–2010)
- Zbyněk Zbořil (2010–2012)
- Bohumil Smrček (2012–2014)
- Josef Mazura (2014–2016)
- Miloslav Machálek (2017–2019)
- Milan Valachovič (2019–2024)
- Pavel Vrba (2024–2025)
- Milan Valachovič (2025)
- Jiří Chytrý (2025–2026)
- Roman Nádvorník (2026–present)

== History in domestic competitions ==
- 1993–2002: I.B class (7th level)
- 2002–2003: I.A class (6th level)
- 2003–2005: South Moravian regional championship
- 2005–2009: Czech Fourth Division
- 2009–2012: Moravian-Silesian Football League
- 2012–2014: Czech Fourth Division
- 2014–2019: Moravian-Silesian Football League
- 2019–2026: Czech National Football League
- 2026–present: Czech First League

- Seasons spent at Level 1 of the football league system: 1
- Seasons spent at Level 2 of the football league system: 7
- Seasons spent at Level 3 of the football league system: 8
- Seasons spent at Level 4 of the football league system: 2
- Seasons spent at Level 5 of the football league system: 2
