= List of Czech football transfers summer 2026 =

This is a list of Czech football transfers for the 2026 summer transfer window. Only transfers featuring Czech First League are listed.

== Czech First League ==
Note: Flags indicate national team as has been defined under FIFA eligibility rules. Players may hold more than one non-FIFA nationality.

=== Slavia Prague ===
In:

No.	Pos.	Nation	Player
6	DF	FRA	Ange N'Guessan (from Slovan Liberec)
8	MF	POL	Oskar Kubiak (from (Poland) Arka Gdynia)
10	FW	SLO	Danijel Šturm (from Sigma Olomouc)
20	MF	NGR	Emmanuel Ayaosi (from Karviná)
22	MF	CIV	Toumani Diakité (from Slovan Liberec)
29	GK	UKR	Nazar Domchak (from (Ukraine) Karpaty Lviv)
30	MF	POL	Wiktor Nowak (from (Poland) Górnik Zabrze, previously on loan at (Poland) Wisła Płock)
32	MF	CZE	Pavel Kačor (from Karviná)
—	DF	FRA	Neil Glossoa (from (France) Pau)
—	DF	CZE	Eric Hunal (from Dukla Prague)

Out:

No.	Pos.	Nation	Player
7	MF	AUT	Muhammed Cham (loan return to (Turkey) Trabzonspor)
9	FW	CZE	Vasil Kušej (on loan to Slovan Liberec)
11	MF	GAM	Youssoupha Sanyang (on loan to Artis Brno)
12	DF	SEN	Youssoupha Mbodji (on loan to (Belgium) Zulte Waregem)
18	DF	CZE	Jan Bořil (to Slovan Liberec)
19	MF	LBR	Oscar Dorley (to (Saudi Arabia) Al-Taawoun)
20	MF	CZE	Alexandr Bužek (to Slovan Liberec)
21	MF	CZE	David Douděra (to (United States) FC Cincinnati)
31	FW	SVK	Erik Prekop (to (Poland) Górnik Zabrze)
36	GK	CZE	Jindřich Staněk (to (Saudi Arabia) Al-Hazem)
37	DF	SVK	Dominik Javorček (on loan to Bohemians 1905)
41	FW	CMR	Simion Michez (to (Belgium) Mechelen)
—	DF	FRA	Neil Glossoa (on loan to Artis Brno)
—	DF	CZE	Denis Halinský (on loan to Pardubice, previously on loan at Teplice)
—	DF	GUI	Sahmkou Camara (on loan to (Slovakia) Slovan Bratislava, previously on loan at Karviná)
—	DF	JPN	Daiki Hashioka (on loan to (Germany) Borussia Mönchengladbach, previously on loan at (Belgium) Gent)
—	MF	GAM	Gibril Sosseh (on loan to Slovácko, previously on loan at Bohemians 1905)
—	MF	KEN	Timothy Ouma (on loan to (England) Charlton Athletic, previously on loan at (Poland) Lech Poznań)
—	DF	CZE	Eric Hunal (to Zbrojovka Brno)
—	MF	CZE	Petr Ševčík (to Zbrojovka Brno)
—	DF	CZE	Albert Labík (to Artis Brno, previously on loan at Karviná)
—	DF	CZE	Ondřej Zmrzlý (to (Poland) Górnik Zabrze, previously on loan)
—	MF	CZE	Dominik Pech (to (Switzerland) Young Boys, previously on loan)
—	MF	CZE	Lukáš Vorlický (to Slovácko, previously on loan at Zbrojovka Brno)
—	FW	NGR	Muhamed Tijani (to (Hungary) Újpest, previously on loan at (Hungary) Nyíregyháza)

=== Sparta Prague ===
In:

No.	Pos.	Nation	Player
6	DF	NOR	Tobias Guddal (from (Norway) Tromsø)
7	FW	CRC	Josimar Alcócer (from (Belgium) Westerlo)
14	FW	NOR	Jonatan Braut Brunes (from (Poland) Raków Częstochowa)
15	DF	HUN	Viktor Vitályos (from (Hungary) MTK Budapest)
20	MF	NOR	Sivert Mannsverk (from (Netherlands) Ajax, previously on loan)
22	DF	FRA	Loïc Mbe Soh (from (Belgium) Sint-Truiden)
25	DF	NED	Ki-Jana Hoever (from (England) Wolverhampton Wanderers, previously on loan at (England) Sheffield United)
27	FW	GAM	Ebrima Singhateh (from Jablonec)
28	MF	CZE	Roman Macek (from Mladá Boleslav)
31	MF	CZE	Matěj Jurásek (on loan from (England) Norwich City)
47	GK	HUN	Krisztián Hegyi (from (England) West Ham United, previously on loan at (Hungary) MTK Budapest)

Out:

No.	Pos.	Nation	Player
1	GK	DEN	Peter Vindahl (on loan to (Italy) Sampdoria)
6	MF	FIN	Kaan Kairinen (to (Greece) AEK Athens)
9	FW	KOS	Albion Rrahmani (to (Italy) Venezia)
10	FW	CZE	Jan Kuchta (on loan to (Poland) Legia Warsaw)
14	DF	ECU	Jhoanner Chávez (loan return to (France) Lens)
17	DF	PER	Oliver Sonne (loan return to (England) Burnley)
22	MF	SVK	Lukáš Haraslín (to (Saudi Arabia) Al-Fateh)
25	DF	DEN	Asger Sørensen (to (Denmark) Copenhagen)
36	FW	AUS	Garang Kuol (on loan to Jablonec)
—	DF	CZE	Ondřej Kukučka (on loan to Zlín, previously on loan at Bohemians 1905)
—	MF	SVK	Dominik Hollý (reloan to Jablonec)
—	MF	CZE	Michal Ševčík (on loan to (Poland) Legia Warsaw, previously on loan at Mladá Boleslav)
—	FW	CMR	Kevin-Prince Milla (on loan to Jablonec, previously on loan at Dukla Prague)
—	GK	CZE	Vojtěch Vorel (to Mladá Boleslav, previously on loan)
—	DF	ESP	Imanol (to (Spain) Eibar, previously on loan at Andorra)
—	MF	CZE	Kryštof Daněk (to (Austria) LASK, previously on loan)
—	MF	SRB	Veljko Birmančević (to (Hungary) Ferencváros, previously on loan at (Spain) Getafe)
—	MF	KOS	Ermal Krasniqi (to (Turkey) Amedspor, previously on loan at (Poland) Legia Warsaw)
—	FW	ALB	Indrit Tuci (to (Slovenia) Olimpija Ljubljana, previously on loan at (Turkey) Kayserispor)

=== Viktoria Plzeň ===
In:

No.	Pos.	Nation	Player
2	DF	SVK	Tobiáš Pališčák (from (Slovakia) Žilina)
3	DF	SVK	Denis Vavro (from (Germany) VfL Wolfsburg)
23	FW	GAM	Baboucarr Faal (from (Ukraine) Karpaty Lviv)
29	DF	CZE	Adam Gabriel (from (Denmark) Midtjylland)
36	MF	SRB	Stefan Pirgić (from (Serbia) Železničar Pančevo)
98	DF	CZE	Filip Prebsl (from Karviná)
—	MF	CZE	Sebastian Boháč (from Karviná)

Out:

No.	Pos.	Nation	Player
16	DF	CZE	Adam Kadlec (on loan to Mladá Boleslav)
29	MF	CZE	Tom Slončík (to Hradec Králové)
32	MF	CZE	Matěj Valenta (to Hradec Králové)
35	FW	CZE	Filip Růžička (on loan to Kladno)
37	DF	SVK	Dávid Krčík (to Pardubice)
51	FW	CZE	Daniel Vašulín (to Zbrojovka Brno)
—	FW	TOG	Idjessi Metsoko (on loan to (Scotland) Dundee United, previously on loan at (Slovakia) Spartak Trnava)
—	GK	CZE	Martin Jedlička (to Baník Ostrava, previously on loan)
—	MF	CZE	Sebastian Boháč (to Artis Brno)
—	FW	BRA	Ricardinho (to (Greece) Asteras Tripolis, previously on loan at (Kazakhstan) Kairat)

=== Hradec Králové ===
In:

No.	Pos.	Nation	Player
3	DF	SVK	Filip Mielke (from (Slovakia) Podbrezová)
9	MF	CZE	Matěj Valenta (from Viktoria Plzeň)
19	MF	CZE	Tom Slončík (from Viktoria Plzeň)
21	DF	CZE	Tomáš Wiesner (from (United States) Houston Dynamo)
33	DF	ESP	Ro Abajas (from (Spain) Huesca)
70	FW	CZE	Tomáš Čvančara (on loan from (Germany) Borussia Mönchengladbach, previously on loan at (Scotland) Celtic)
—	FW	BLR	German Barkovsky (from (Poland) Puszcza Niepołomice, previously on loan at (Poland) Piast Gliwice)

Out:

No.	Pos.	Nation	Player
3	DF	CZE	Martin Suchomel (loan return to Sparta Prague)
6	MF	CZE	Václav Pilař (to Bohemians 1905)
9	FW	SVK	Lukáš Čmelík (free agent)
14	FW	CZE	Jakub Hodek (on loan to Vlašim)
18	FW	LAT	Marko Regža (on loan to (Hungary) Nyíregyháza Spartacus)
23	MF	CZE	Adam Binar (on loan to Prostějov)
77	DF	CZE	Lucas Kubr (on loan to HS Kroměříž)
—	FW	BLR	German Barkovsky (on loan to (Poland) Polonia Warsaw)
—	FW	CZE	Daniel Hais (on loan to HS Kroměříž, previously on loan at Prostějov)
—	FW	CZE	Filip Firbacher (to Písek, previously on loan at (Slovakia) Považská Bystrica)

=== Jablonec ===
In:

No.	Pos.	Nation	Player
9	FW	CZE	Antonín Růsek (from Sigma Olomouc)
11	FW	CMR	Kevin-Prince Milla (on loan from Sparta Prague, previously on loan at Dukla Prague)
15	DF	SRB	Dušan Pavlović (from (Serbia) Radnički Niš)
16	MF	SWE	Hugo Ahl (from (Slovakia) Zemplín Michalovce)
17	FW	CMR	Saidou Alioum (from (Sweden) Göteborg)
20	DF	CZE	Jiří Sláma (from Sigma Olomouc)
22	MF	CZE	Roman Horák (from Sparta Prague B, previously on loan at Slovácko)
24	MF	SVK	Dominik Hollý (reloan from Sparta Prague)
27	FW	CZE	Filip Vecheta (on loan from Pardubice)
33	GK	SVK	Michal Kukučka (on loan from (Germany) 1. FC Nürnberg, previously on loan at (Slovenia) Koper)
36	FW	AUS	Garang Kuol (on loan from Sparta Prague)
62	MF	UKR	Samuel Obinaya (from (Ukraine) Kharkiv, previously on loan)

Out:

No.	Pos.	Nation	Player
5	DF	CZE	David Štěpánek (to Slovácko)
17	MF	SVK	Samuel Lavrinčík (on loan to (Slovakia) Ružomberok)
24	FW	CZE	David Puškáč (to Slovácko)
27	FW	GAM	Ebrima Singhateh (to Sparta Prague)
28	FW	CGO	Béni Makouana (loan return to (Ukraine) Polissya Zhytomyr)
42	FW	SLO	Matej Malenšek (on loan to (Slovenia) Bravo)
62	MF	UKR	Samuel Obinaya (on loan to Bohemians 1905)
77	FW	CMR	Alexis Alégué (to Artis Brno)
84	DF	CRO	Renato Pantalon (to (Romania) CFR Cluj)

=== Slovan Liberec ===
In:

No.	Pos.	Nation	Player
6	MF	GEO	Aleko Basiladze (from (Georgia (country)) Torpedo Kutaisi)
16	MF	CZE	Alexandr Bužek (from Slavia Prague)
19	FW	CZE	Vasil Kušej (on loan from Slavia Prague)
25	FW	CZE	Matěj Mikulenka (from Sigma Olomouc)
26	DF	CZE	Jan Bořil (from Slavia Prague)
29	DF	CZE	Lukáš Hůlka (from Bohemians 1905)
30	DF	ZAM	David Hamansenya (on loan from (Spain) Leganés, previously on loan at Artis Brno)
60	MF	SEN	Fallou Faye (from (Slovenia) Bravo)
77	FW	CZE	Daniel Rus (from Sparta Prague B, previously on loan)
79	FW	SLO	Enej Marsetič (from (Slovenia) Brinje Grosuplje)
94	FW	CAF	Vénuste Baboula (from (Slovenia) Bravo)
—	MF	NGR	Johnson Dauda (from (Serbia) Novi Pazar)

Out:

No.	Pos.	Nation	Player
1	GK	SVK	Ivan Krajčírik (on loan to (Slovakia) Ružomberok)
4	DF	SVK	Martin Rýzek (on loan to (Slovakia) Skalica)
7	MF	NGR	Afolabi Soliu (on loan to Zbrojovka Brno)
8	MF	CZE	Marek Icha (from Pardubice)
11	FW	CZE	Filip Špatenka (on loan to Mladá Boleslav)
16	DF	FRA	Ange N'Guessan (to Slavia Prague)
20	MF	BIH	Ermin Mahmić (to (Turkey) Çorum)
21	FW	SVK	Lukáš Letenay (on loan to Mladá Boleslav)
30	MF	CIV	Toumani Diakité (to Slavia Prague)
—	MF	NGR	Johnson Dauda (on loan to (Serbia) Novi Pazar)
—	DF	CZE	Dominik Mašek (on loan to Arsenal Česká Lípa, previously on loan at (Slovakia) Ružomberok)
—	MF	CZE	Hynek Hruška (on loan to Kladno, previously on loan at Vlašim)
—	FW	GHA	Benjamin Nyarko (to (Austria) Admira Wacker, previously on loan at Teplice)

=== Sigma Olomouc ===
In:

No.	Pos.	Nation	Player
4	DF	BRA	Léo Borges (from (Poland) Pogoń Szczecin)
11	FW	ISL	Hilmir Rafn Mikaelsson (from (Norway) Viking)
14	MF	CRO	Marko Soldo (from (Croatia) Dinamo Zagreb)
19	MF	CZE	Daniel Barát (from Slovácko)
26	DF	CMR	Stéphane Noumbissie (on loan from (France) Lille)
28	MF	POL	Igor Brzyski (from (Poland) Pogoń Szczecin)
29	DF	SWE	Anton Ekeroth (from (Norway) HamKam)
31	GK	CRO	Anthony Pavlešić (from (Croatia) Rudeš)

Out:

No.	Pos.	Nation	Player
4	DF	CZE	Jakub Elbel (to Baník Ostrava)
7	FW	SLO	Danijel Šturm (to Slavia Prague)
13	DF	CZE	Jiří Sláma (to Jablonec)
14	FW	CZE	Antonín Růsek (to Jablonec)
19	MF	POL	Jakub Jezierski (on loan to (Norway) Fredrikstad)
20	MF	SRB	Dario Grgić (on loan to (Slovakia) Ružomberok)
25	FW	CZE	Matěj Mikulenka (to Slovan Liberec)
29	GK	CZE	Tadeáš Stoppen (on loan to Artis Brno)
35	FW	EGY	Mohamed Yasser (to Bohemians 1905)
77	MF	LTU	Artūr Dolžnikov (to Slovácko)
—	FW	NGR	Yunusa Muritala (to (Slovakia) Komárno)
—	FW	CZE	Jan Fiala (on loan to Slovácko, previously on loan at Karviná)
—	GK	CZE	Jakub Trefil (to (Slovakia) Dukla Banská Bystrica, previously on loan at (Denmark) Kolding)
—	MF	MKD	Tihomir Kostadinov (to Slovácko, previously on loan)

=== Pardubice ===
In:

No.	Pos.	Nation	Player
6	MF	CZE	Marek Icha (from Slovan Liberec)
17	FW	CZE	Václav Drchal (from Bohemians 1905)
21	DF	CIV	Mouhamed Tidjane Traore (from Dukla Prague)
23	GK	GEO	Luka Kharatishvili (from (Georgia (country)) Dinamo Batumi, previously on loan)
33	DF	CZE	Denis Halinský (on loan from Sparta Prague, previously on loan at Teplice)
37	DF	SVK	Dávid Krčík (from Viktoria Plzeň)
46	DF	CZE	Vladimír Neuman (on loan from Karviná)
99	FW	BRA	Kahuan Vinícius (on loan from Karviná)

Out:

No.	Pos.	Nation	Player
4	DF	CZE	David Šimek (to Artis Brno)
5	DF	CZE	Jiří Hamza (on loan to Karviná)
7	MF	CZE	Kamil Vacek (retired)
10	FW	CZE	Filip Vecheta (on loan to Jablonec)
17	FW	CZE	Ladislav Krobot (to Bohemians 1905)
18	MF	CZE	Štěpán Míšek (on loan to Karviná)
23	DF	CZE	Michal Surzyn (on loan to Prostějov)
32	DF	CZE	Mikuláš Konečný (loan return to Slavia Prague)
39	DF	SVK	Samuel Kopásek (on loan to (Poland) Lechia Gdańsk)
92	DF	UKR	Bohdan Slyubyk (on loan to (Ukraine) LNZ Cherkasy)
—	FW	PHI	André Leipold (on loan to (Germany) SC Verl, previously on loan at (Netherlands) Helmond Sport)
—	FW	GAM	Muhammed Suso (on loan to (Finland) Inter Turku, previously on loan at (Finland) SJK)
—	DF	CZE	Václav Jindra (to Vlašim, previously on loan)
—	MF	HAI	Dominique Simon (to (United Arab Emirates) Hatta, previously on loan at (Slovakia) Tatran Prešov)

=== Bohemians 1905 ===
In:

No.	Pos.	Nation	Player
8	DF	CZE	David Heidenreich (free agent)
9	FW	CZE	Ladislav Krobot (from Pardubice)
11	MF	CZE	Václav Pilař (from Hradec Králové)
14	FW	EGY	Mohamed Yasser (from Sigma Olomouc)
16	MF	CZE	Roman Květ (from (Belgium) Dender)
37	DF	SVK	Dominik Javorček (on loan from Slavia Prague)
62	MF	UKR	Samuel Obinaya (on loan from Jablonec)
99	FW	SVK	Ladislav Almási (from Baník Ostrava)

Out:

No.	Pos.	Nation	Player
8	MF	CZE	Robert Hrubý (to Viktoria Žižkov)
9	FW	BHR	Abdulla Yusuf Helal (to (Kuwait) Al-Salmiya)
20	FW	CZE	Václav Drchal (to Pardubice)
28	DF	CZE	Lukáš Hůlka (to Slovan Liberec)
35	DF	CZE	Ondřej Kukučka (loan return to Sparta Prague)
77	FW	MKD	Milan Ristovski (to (Indonesia) Bhayangkara Presisi Lampung)
99	MF	GAM	Gibril Sosseh (loan return to Slavia Prague)

=== Teplice ===
In:

No.	Pos.	Nation	Player
4	DF	LAT	Oskars Vientiess (from Chrudim)
7	FW	GAM	Abdourahman Badamosi (from (Estonia) Paide)
12	MF	CZE	Marcel Čermák (from Dukla Prague)
13	DF	UKR	Denys Taraduda (from (Slovakia) Spartak Trnava, previously on loan at (Slovakia) Tatran Prešov)
20	MF	UKR	Artem Garzha (from (Latvia) Daugavpils)
25	MF	SVK	Matej Riznič (from (Slovakia) Petržalka, previously on loan)
32	DF	CZE	Sebastian Pech (from Sparta Prague B)

Out:

No.	Pos.	Nation	Player
17	DF	CZE	Denis Halinský (loan return to Slavia Prague)
18	DF	LBR	Emmanuel Fully (loan return to Slavia Prague B)
27	FW	GHA	Benjamin Nyarko (loan return to Slovan Liberec)
33	GK	SVK	Richard Ludha (to (Slovakia) Skalica)
—	MF	CZE	Marek Beránek (on loan to (Slovakia) Slovan Galanta, previously on loan at Chrudim)
—	DF	UKR	Yehor Tsykalo (to (Lithuania) Sūduva, previously on loan at (Poland) Stal Mielec)

=== Zlín ===
In:

No.	Pos.	Nation	Player
9	FW	CZE	Daniel Šmiga (from Slavia Prague B, previously on loan at Příbram)
10	MF	CZE	Stanislav Petruta (on loan from Baník Ostrava)
11	MF	SVK	Adam Gaži (from (Slovakia) Skalica)
15	DF	CRO	Zvonimir Katalinić (from (Croatia) Slaven Belupo)
20	MF	GHA	Frank Appiah (from (Slovakia) Petržalka)
27	MF	CZE	Miloš Kratochvíl (free agent)
35	DF	CZE	Ondřej Kukučka (on loan from Sparta Prague, previously on loan at Bohemians 1905)
45	DF	COD	Prince Mukuba (from (France) Lyon B)

Out:

No.	Pos.	Nation	Player
10	MF	CZE	Jakub Pešek (to Sparta Prague B)
15	FW	CZE	Matěj Koubek (to (Slovakia) Ružomberok)
16	MF	CZE	Stanislav Petruta (to Baník Ostrava)
30	FW	CZE	Lukáš Bránecký (on loan to Opava)
91	DF	CZE	Jan Kalabiška (to Hodonín)
—	DF	CZE	Šimon Polášek (to Prostějov, previously on loan)
—	FW	SEN	El Hadji Ndiaye (to Artis Brno, previously on loan at Opava)

=== Mladá Boleslav ===
In:

No.	Pos.	Nation	Player
9	FW	SVK	Lukáš Letenay (on loan from Slovan Liberec)
14	MF	CZE	Samuel Grygar (on loan from Baník Ostrava, previously on loan at (Slovakia) Ružomberok)
17	FW	CZE	Filip Špatenka (on loan from Slovan Liberec)
18	MF	CZE	Marek Havran (on loan from Baník Ostrava)
27	DF	CZE	Adam Kadlec (on loan from Viktoria Plzeň)
42	GK	CZE	Vojtěch Vorel (from Sparta Prague, previously on loan)

Out:

No.	Pos.	Nation	Player
7	MF	CZE	Roman Macek (to Sparta Prague)
15	MF	CZE	Nicolas Penner (on loan to Příbram)
22	MF	CZE	Michal Ševčík (loan return to Sparta Prague)
25	FW	CZE	Christophe Kabongo (loan return to Viktoria Plzeň)
31	DF	CZE	Dominik Kostka (to (Slovakia) Ružomberok)
37	FW	CZE	Matouš Krulich (on loan to Příbram)
—	DF	CZE	Tomáš Král (on loan to Slovácko, previously on loan at (Slovakia) Ružomberok)
—	MF	CZE	Lukáš Fila (on loan to Příbram, previously on loan at (Slovakia) Ružomberok)

=== Slovácko ===
In:

No.	Pos.	Nation	Player
7	FW	GRE	Giannis Niarchos (from (Poland) Wisła Płock)
11	FW	CZE	Filip Horský (from Slavia Prague B)
16	MF	GAM	Gibril Sosseh (on loan from Slavia Prague, previously on loan at Bohemians 1905)
18	FW	CZE	Jan Fiala (on loan from Sigma Olomouc, previously on loan at Karviná)
19	DF	CZE	Tomáš Král (on loan from Mladá Boleslav, previously on loan at (Slovakia) Ružomberok)
21	DF	CZE	Šimon Slončík (on loan from Slavia Prague B, previously on loan at Karviná)
22	DF	CIV	Jocelin Behiratche (from (Ukraine) Oleksandriya)
23	DF	CZE	David Štěpánek (from Jablonec)
26	MF	MKD	Tihomir Kostadinov (from Sigma Olomouc, previously on loan)
27	MF	LTU	Artūr Dolžnikov (from Sigma Olomouc)
28	DF	CZE	Leoš Prior (from (Latvia) Jelgava)
30	FW	CZE	David Puškáč (from Jablonec)
34	GK	CZE	Pavel Halouska (from (Slovakia) Petržalka)
72	MF	CZE	Lukáš Vorlický (from Slavia Prague, previously on loan at Zbrojovka Brno)

Out:

No.	Pos.	Nation	Player
7	DF	SVK	Martin Koscelník (to (Slovakia) Zemplín Michalovce)
11	MF	CZE	Milan Petržela (to Slavoj Koloveč)
14	MF	CZE	Daniel Barát (to Sigma Olomouc)
16	MF	SVK	Adrián Fiala (loan return to (Slovakia) Trenčín)
17	MF	CZE	Jan Suchan (loan return to Jablonec)
18	DF	ISR	Jonathan Mulder (on loan to (Slovakia) Trenčín)
21	FW	CZE	Michael Krmenčík (to Boršice)
22	DF	SVK	Tomáš Huk (loan return to Sigma Olomouc)
23	DF	CZE	Petr Reinberk (to Boršice)
27	FW	CAN	Adonija Ouanda (loan return to Slavia Prague)
28	DF	CZE	Vlastimil Daníček (to Napajedla)
30	GK	CZE	Tomáš Fryšták (retired)
37	MF	CZE	Štěpán Beran (to Sigma Olomouc B)
55	FW	SLO	Žan Medved (loan return to (Hungary) Nyíregyháza Spartacus)
72	MF	CZE	Roman Horák (loan return to Sparta Prague B)

=== Baník Ostrava ===
In:

No.	Pos.	Nation	Player
3	DF	SUI	Rhodri Smith (on loan from (Switzerland) Young Boys, previously on loan at (Switzerland) Winterthur)
7	MF	TTO	Dantaye Gilbert (from Dukla Prague)
8	MF	CIV	Aboubacar Traoré (from Karviná)
16	DF	UKR	Maksym Dyachuk (on loan from (Ukraine) Dynamo Kyiv, previously on loan at (Poland) Lechia Gdańsk)
23	GK	CZE	Martin Jedlička (from Viktoria Plzeň, previously on loan)
44	DF	UKR	Yevheniy Skyba (from Karviná)
77	GK	CZE	Matouš Babka (from Opava)
81	DF	SVK	Matúš Kmeť (from (United States) Minnesota United, previously on loan at (Slovakia) DAC Dunajská Streda)
83	MF	CMR	Roan Nogha (from (Cameroon) Nkufo Academy, previously on loan)
—	DF	CZE	Jakub Elbel (from Sigma Olomouc)
—	MF	CZE	Stanislav Petruta (from Zlín)

Out:

No.	Pos.	Nation	Player
2	MF	CZE	Marek Havran (on loan to Mladá Boleslav)
3	DF	SEN	Hamidou Kante (loan return to Slavia Prague)
6	DF	CZE	Karel Pojezný (on loan to Artis Brno)
9	MF	CZE	David Buchta (to (Serbia) Radnički 1923)
10	MF	SRB	Srđan Plavšić (loan return to (Poland) Raków Częstochowa)
15	DF	GHA	Patrick Kpozo (to (Kazakhstan) Zhenis)
20	DF	COL	Pablo Ortiz (on loan to (Colombia) Atlético Junior)
25	MF	GER	Dennis Owusu (on loan to Opava)
26	FW	FIN	Lauri Laine (on loan to (Finland) Inter Turku)
29	FW	SVK	Jakub Pira (on loan to Karviná)
66	MF	SVK	Matúš Rusnák (on loan to (Slovakia) Železiarne Podbrezová)
77	FW	SVK	Ladislav Almási (to Bohemians 1905)
81	DF	CZE	Ondřej Kričfaluši (to (Belgium) Union Saint-Gilloise)
—	MF	CZE	Stanislav Petruta (on loan to Zlín)
—	MF	CZE	Samuel Grygar (on loan to Mladá Boleslav, previously on loan at (Slovakia) Ružomberok)
—	MF	CZE	Christian Frýdek (to (Indonesia) Garudayaksa, previously on loan)

=== Zbrojovka Brno ===
In:

No.	Pos.	Nation	Player
4	DF	CZE	Eric Hunal (from Slavia Prague)
6	MF	CZE	Lukáš Penxa (from Sparta Prague B, previously on loan at Dukla Prague)
10	MF	CZE	Antonín Vaníček (from Dynamo České Budějovice)
15	FW	CZE	Daniel Vašulín (from Viktoria Plzeň)
17	MF	CZE	Jaromír Zmrhal (from (Cyprus) Apollon Limassol)
23	MF	CZE	Petr Ševčík (from Slavia Prague)
38	DF	CZE	Jakub Pokorný (from (Greece) Kifisia)
44	DF	MLI	Amadou Dante (from (Portugal) Arouca)
77	FW	NGR	Lucky Ezeh (from Karviná)
79	MF	NGR	Afolabi Soliu (on loan from Slovan Liberec)

Out:

No.	Pos.	Nation	Player
5	DF	SRB	Alex Marković (on loan to Karviná)
6	MF	CZE	Daniel Polák (on loan to HS Kroměříž)
10	FW	CZE	Jakub Selnar (to Karviná)
16	FW	CZE	Adam Kronus (to Karviná)
22	DF	CZE	Petr Mareš (to Viktoria Žižkov)
23	MF	CZE	Lukáš Vorlický (loan return to Slavia Prague)
27	MF	CZE	Filip Blecha (to Arsenal Česká Lípa)
31	MF	MKD	Martin Gjorgievski (on loan to (Slovakia) Dukla Banská Bystrica)
64	MF	CZE	Jan Hellebrand (to Mladcová)
66	DF	CZE	Stanislav Hofmann (to Boršice)
74	FW	CUW	Rigino Cicilia (free agent)

=== Artis Brno ===
In:

No.	Pos.	Nation	Player
7	FW	CMR	Alexis Alégué (from Jablonec)
8	MF	NED	Sacha Komljenovic (from Baník Ostrava B, previously on loan at (Slovenia) Mura)
9	DF	CZE	Albert Labík (from Slavia Prague, previously on loan at Karviná)
12	FW	SEN	El Hadji Ndiaye (from Zlín, previously on loan at Opava)
14	MF	CZE	Adam Petrák (from Viktoria Žižkov)
15	DF	LBR	Emmanuel Fully (on loan from Slavia Prague B, previously on loan at Teplice)
16	DF	SRB	Danijel Kolarić (from (Serbia) Spartak Subotica)
17	FW	CPV	Papalélé (from Opava)
18	MF	CIV	Ismael Sylla (from (Latvia) Super Nova)
20	MF	POL	Dominik Sarapata (on loan from (Denmark) Copenhagen, previously on loan at (Poland) Wisła Płock)
21	MF	SWE	Adam Carlén (from (Netherlands) Excelsior)
27	DF	CZE	Dominik Preisler (from (Poland) Ruch Chorzów)
28	DF	CZE	David Šimek (from Pardubice)
32	GK	CZE	Tadeáš Stoppen (on loan from Sigma Olomouc)
33	DF	FRA	Neil Glossoa (on loan from Slavia Prague)
34	DF	CZE	Karel Pojezný (on loan from Baník Ostrava)
36	MF	CZE	Sebastian Boháč (from Viktoria Plzeň)
87	FW	MNE	Vladimir Perišić (from Slavia Prague B, previously on loan at (Slovakia) Košice)
90	MF	GAM	Youssoupha Sanyang (on loan from Slavia Prague)

Out:

No.	Pos.	Nation	Player
1	GK	CZE	Tomáš Holý (to Viagem Ústí nad Labem)
3	DF	OMA	Khalid Al-Braiki (to (Oman) Al-Shabab)
7	FW	OMA	Abdulrahman Al-Mushaifri (to (Kuwait) Al-Qadsia)
8	MF	CZE	Radim Breite (to Karviná)
9	FW	FRA	Jean-David Beauguel (free agent)
10	MF	CZE	Daniel Samek (on loan to Kladno)
12	DF	ZAM	David Hamansenya (loan return to (Spain) Leganés)
15	DF	CZE	Jan Štěrba (retired)
17	FW	UKR	Artem Byesyedin (free agent)
21	FW	GHA	David Osei (loan return to (Spain) Leganés)
32	MF	CZE	Daniel Kosek (loan return to Slovácko)
99	FW	CZE	Daniel Švancara (on loan to (Slovakia) Petržalka)

== See also ==
- 2026–27 Czech First League
