= 2023–24 MFK Karviná season =

MFK Karviná
2023–24 season
- Manager: Tomáš Hejdušek (until 18 September); Ľubomír Luhový (caretaker, 19–27 September); Juraj Jarábek (from 27 September)
- Stadium: Městský stadion
- Czech First League: 14th
- Czech Cup: Second round

The 2023–24 season was MFK Karviná's 119th season in existence and first one back in the Czech First League. They also competed in the Czech Cup.

== Players ==
=== First-team squad ===
As of 10 September 2023

Note: Flags indicate national team as defined under FIFA eligibility rules; some limited exceptions apply. Players may hold more than one non-FIFA nationality.

No.	Pos.	Nation	Player
1	GK	CZE	Vladimír Neuman
5	DF	CZE	Michal Hošek (on loan from Slavia Prague)
6	MF	CZE	Sebastian Boháč
7	MF	SVK	Alex Iván
8	DF	CZE	Dominik Soukeník
10	MF	CPV	Papalélé
11	DF	MNE	Andrija Ražnatović
12	MF	CZE	Dominik Žák
15	DF	MKD	Filip Antovski
16	FW	SVK	Matej Franko
18	DF	CZE	Jiří Bederka
19	FW	NGR	Adeleke Akinyemi
20	MF	CZE	Daniel Bartl
21	DF	CZE	Jan Žídek

No.	Pos.	Nation	Player
22	DF	CZE	Jaroslav Svozil
23	MF	CZE	Lukáš Budínský
24	DF	SVK	Matej Čurma
25	DF	CZE	Jiří Fleišman (on loan from Baník Ostrava)
26	FW	NGR	Lucky Ezeh
28	MF	CZE	Patrik Čavoš
29	MF	SVK	Rajmund Mikuš
30	GK	CZE	Jakub Lapeš
31	GK	CZE	Jiří Ciupa
37	DF	SVK	Dávid Krčík
51	FW	CZE	Martin Doležal
77	GK	SVK	Dominik Holec
99	MF	BIH	Amar Memić

=== Out on loan ===
Note: Flags indicate national team as defined under FIFA eligibility rules; some limited exceptions apply. Players may hold more than one non-FIFA nationality.

No.	Pos.	Nation	Player
—	DF	SVK	Juraj Teplan (at Liptovský Mikuláš)

== Transfers ==
=== In ===
Pos.	Player	Transferred from	Fee	Date	Source

=== Out ===
Pos.	Player	Transferred to	Fee	Date	Source

== Pre-season and friendlies ==
Win Draw Loss

23 June 2023 Friendly	Karviná (Czech Republic)	3–2	(Slovakia) Železiarne Podbrezová
17:00

1 July 2023 Friendly	GKS Tychy (Poland)	3–2	(Czech Republic) Karviná
11:00

5 July 2023 Friendly	Wisła Puławy (Poland)	2–2	(Czech Republic) Karviná
17:00

8 July 2023 Friendly	Karviná (Czech Republic)	1–0	(Slovakia) MFK Ružomberok
16:00

11 July 2023 Friendly	Nieciecza KS (Poland)	1–1	(Czech Republic) Karviná
11:00

15 July 2023 Friendly	Karviná (Czech Republic)	2–3	(Poland) Podbeskidzie
12:00

13 October 2023 Friendly	GKS Tychy (Poland)	0–1	(Czech Republic) Karviná
11:00

17 November 2023 Friendly	Piast Gliwice (Poland)	3–0	(Czech Republic) Karviná
12:00

== Competitions ==
=== Overall record ===
Competition	First match	Last match	Starting round	Final position	Record							
Competition	First match	Last match	Starting round	Final position	Pld	W	D	L	GF	GA	GD	Win %
Czech First League	22 July 2023	2 June 2024	Matchday 1	14th	35	8	8	19	38	62	−24	22.86
Czech Cup	6 September 2023		Second round	Second round	1	0	0	1	0	1	−1	0.00
Total					36	8	8	20	38	63	−25	22.22

Source: Soccerway

=== Czech First League ===
==== Results summary ====
Overall								Home						Away					
Pld	W	D	L	GF	GA	GD	Pts	W	D	L	GF	GA	GD	W	D	L	GF	GA	GD
35	8	8	19	38	62	−24	32	5	4	8	20	28	−8	3	4	11	18	34	−16

Source: Fortuna Liga

==== Regular season ====
===== League table =====
Pos	Team	Pld	W	D	L	GF	GA	GD	Pts	Qualification or relegation
12	Jablonec	30	6	12	12	35	45	−10	30	Qualification for the Relegation group
13	Pardubice	30	7	7	16	29	42	−13	28	Qualification for the Relegation group
14	Karviná	30	6	7	17	30	52	−22	25	Qualification for the Relegation group
15	Zlín	30	5	10	15	36	61	−25	25	Qualification for the Relegation group
16	České Budějovice	30	6	6	18	34	62	−28	24	Qualification for the Relegation group

Source: Fortuna Liga
Rules for classification: 1) Points; 2) Head-to-head points; 3) Head-to-head goal difference; 4) Head-to-head goals scored; 5) Goal difference; 6) Goals scored; 7) Fair-play ranking; 8) Draw.

===== Results by round =====
Round	1	2	3	4	5	6	7	8	9	10	11	12	13	14	15	16	17	18	19	20	21	22	23	24	25	26	27	28	29	30
Ground	H	A	H	A	H	A	A	H	A	H	A	H	A	H	A	H	A	A	H	H	H	A	H	A	H	A	H	A	H	A
Result	W	L	L	L	D	L	L	L	L	W	L	W	W	L	L	L	D	D	L	L	L	D	L	L	W	L	D	D	D	W
Position	1	7	11	13	11	12	14	15	15	14	15	12	12	12	13	13	13	14	14	14	15	16	16	16	15	15	15	16	16	14

Source: Fortuna Liga
A = Away; H = Home; W = Win; D = Draw; L = Loss

===== Matches =====
The league fixtures were unveiled on 21 June 2023.

22 July 2023 1	Karviná	4–1	Zlín	Karviná
15:00 CEST (UTC+2)	Mikuš 6'; Budínský 27'; Svozil 34'; Bartl 53'	Report		Stadium: Městský stadion Attendance: 2,967; Referee: Daniel Vokoun

29 July 2023 2	Sigma Olomouc	3–1	Karviná	Olomouc
15:00 CEST (UTC+2)	Juliš 15'; Zmrzlý 33'; Navrátil 66'	Report	Papalélé 44'	Stadium: Andrův stadion Attendance: 3,254; Referee: Dominik Starý

5 August 2023 3	Karviná	1–2	Mladá Boleslav	Karviná
15:00 CEST (UTC+2)	Mikuš 70'	Report	Jawo 6'; Helal 19'	Stadium: Městský stadion Attendance: 3,226; Referee: Jan Petřík

13 August 2023 4	Pardubice	2–1	Karviná	Pardubice
15:00 CEST (UTC+2)	Tischler 39'; Matoušek 55'	Report	Halinský 90+4' (o.g.)	Stadium: CFIG Arena; Attendance: 2,887; Referee: Ondřej Berka

19 August 2023 5	Karviná	1–1	Jablonec	Karviná
15:00 CEST (UTC+2)	Papalélé (yellow card) 39'; Ezeh (yellow card) 50'; Memić (yellow card) 53'; Ražnatovič (yellow card) 64'; Akinyemi 84'; Hejdušek (assistant coach) (yellow card) (after game)	Report	Houska (yellow card) 13'; Chanturishvili (yellow card) 45+2'; Martinec (yellow card) 47'; Kratochvíl 56' (pen.); Hurtado (yellow card) 90+2'	Stadium: Městský stadion Attendance: 2,340; Referee: Vít Zaoral

27 August 2023 6	Sparta Prague	3–1	Karviná	Prague
18:00 CEST (UTC+2)	Karabec 6', (red card) 57'; Ryneš 27'; Pavelka 87'	Report	Bartl (yellow card) 75'; Mikuš 82'	Stadium: epet ARENA; Attendance: 16,256; Referee: Jan Machálek

3 September 2023 7	Slavia Prague	5–1	Karviná	Prague
18:00 CEST (UTC+2)	Tijani 13'; Jurásek 38'; Jurečka 43'; Chytil 70'; Wallem 76' (pen.)	Report	Akinyemi 6'	Stadium: Fortuna Arena; Attendance: 17,352; Referee: Dominik Starý

16 September 2023 8	Karviná	0–1	Teplice	Karviná
15:00 CEST (UTC+2)		Report	Fila 82'	Stadium: Městský stadion Attendance: 2,268; Referee: Jan Petřík

23 September 2023 9	Slovácko	2–0	Karviná	Uherské Hradiště
15:00 CEST (UTC+2)	Holzer 2'; Valenta 18'	Report		Stadium: Městský fotbalový stadion Miroslava Valenty; Attendance: 4,516; Referee: Dalibor Černý

30 September 2023 10	Karviná	5–2	Slovan Liberec	Karviná
15:00 CEST (UTC+2)	Čurma (yellow card) 2'; Iván 11'; Moses (yellow card) 27'; Budínský 38'; Akinyemi 41'; Memić 70', (yellow card) 90+3'; Traoré 83'	Report	Mikula 14'; Tupta 47'; Červ (yellow card) 68'	Stadium: Městský stadion Attendance: 2,212; Referee: Tomáš Klíma

7 October 2023 11	České Budějovice	1–0	Karviná	České Budějovice
15:00 CEST (UTC+2)	Alli 87'	Report		Stadium: Stadion Střelecký ostrov Attendance: 2,249; Referee: Michael Kvítek

21 October 2023 12	Karviná	1–0	Hradec Králové	Karviná
15:00 CEST (UTC+2)	Ezeh 78'	Report		Stadium: Městský stadion Attendance: 2,270; Referee: Stanislav Volek

29 October 2023 13	Viktoria Plzeň	0–1	Karviná	Plzeň
15:00 CEST (UTC+2)		Report	Čavoš 76'	Stadium: Doosan Arena; Attendance: 8,418; Referee: Dominik Starý

5 November 2023 14	Karviná	1–3	Baník Ostrava	Karviná
15:00 CET (UTC+1)	Budínský 25'	Report	Ewerton 49'; Buchta 53', 59'	Stadium: Městský stadion Attendance: 4,838; Referee: Karel Rouček

11 November 2023 15	Bohemians 1905	1–0	Karviná	Prague
18:00 CET (UTC+1)	Prekop 52'	Report		Stadium: Ďolíček; Attendance: 4,279; Referee: Jan Machálek

25 November 2023 16	Karviná	0–2	Sigma Olomouc	Karviná
15:00 CET (UTC+1)		Report	Juliš 7', 46'	Stadium: Městský stadion Attendance: 1,714; Referee: Tomáš Klíma

13 December 2023 17	Mladá Boleslav	2–2	Karviná	Mladá Boleslav
17:00 CET (UTC+1)	Ladra 25'; Helal 64'	Report	Memić 7'; Doležal 13'	Stadium: Lokotrans Aréna; Attendance: 960; Referee: Ladislav Szikszay
Note: The match was originally scheduled for 5 December 2023, but was postponed due to snow.

16 December 2023 19	Jablonec	0–0	Karviná	Jablonec nad Nisou
15:00 CET (UTC+1)	Krulich (yellow card) 8'; Látal (coach) (yellow card) 36'; Hurtado (yellow card) 42'	Report	Boháč (yellow card) 38'; Krčík (yellow card) 45+2'	Stadium: Stadion Střelnice; Attendance: 1,059; Referee: Dalibor Černý

10 February 2024 20	Karviná	0–3	Sparta Prague	Karviná
15:00 CET (UTC+1)	Holec (yellow card) 60'; E. Muryc (not on pitch) (yellow card) 69'; Bederka (yellow card) 90+2'	Report	Krejčí 31'; Karabec 60'; Kuchta 69'	Stadium: Městský stadion Attendance: 4,238; Referee: Karel Rouček

14 February 2024 18	Karviná	0–3	Pardubice	Karviná
17:00 CET (UTC+1)		Report	Daněk 24'; Icha 75'; Krobot 77'	Stadium: Městský stadion Attendance: 1,510; Referee: Ondřej Berka

18 February 2024 21	Karviná	0–3	Slavia Prague	Karviná
15:00 CET (UTC+1)		Report	Memić 15' (o.g.); Chytil 17'; Diouf 80'	Stadium: Městský stadion Attendance: 4,038; Referee: Ladislav Szikszay

24 February 2024 22	Teplice	2–2	Karviná	Teplice
15:00 CET (UTC+1)	Fila 53' (pen.); Yasser 64'	Report	Krčík 14'; Akinyemi 79'	Stadium: Na Stínadlech; Attendance: 3,475; Referee: Tomáš Batík

2 March 2024 23	Karviná	1–3	Slovácko	Karviná
15:00 CET (UTC+1)	Krčík 30'	Report	Sinyavskiy 37'; Hofmann 58'; Havlík 65' (pen.)	Stadium: Městský stadion Attendance: 1,820; Referee: Marek Radina

9 March 2024 24	Slovan Liberec	1–0	Karviná	Liberec
15:00 CET (UTC+1)	Prebsl (yellow card) 76'; Rabušic 84' (pen.); Vliegen (yellow card) 90+1'	Report	Svozil (yellow card) 30'; Bergqvist (yellow card) 59'; Memić (yellow card) 61'; Fleišman (yellow card) 84'; Vlk (assistant coach) (yellow card) 90+3'	Stadium: Stadion u Nisy; Attendance: 1,831; Referee: Stanislav Volek

16 March 2024 25	Karviná	2–1	České Budějovice	Karviná
15:00 CET (UTC+1)	Memić 30'; Iván 90+3' (pen.)	Report	Suchan 20'	Stadium: Městský stadion Attendance: 1,862; Referee: Jan Všetečka

31 March 2024 26	Hradec Králové	2–1	Karviná	Hradec Králové
15:00 CEST (UTC+2)	Harazim 25'; Spáčil 65'	Report	Klíma 35' (o.g.)	Stadium: Malšovická aréna Attendance: 5,508; Referee: Petr Hocek

6 April 2024 27	Karviná	0–0	Viktoria Plzeň	Karviná
15:00 CEST (UTC+2)		Report		Stadium: Městský stadion Attendance: 3,026; Referee: Adam Trska

14 April 2024 28	Baník Ostrava	2–2	Karviná	Ostrava
15:00 CEST (UTC+2)	Ewerton 19', 74' (pen.)	Report	Regáli 63'; Ražnatovič 80'	Stadium: Městský stadion Attendance: 12,296; Referee: Jan Machálek

20 April 2024 29	Karviná	1–1	Bohemians 1905	Karviná
15:00 CEST (UTC+2)	Budínský 54'	Report	Prekop 59' (pen.)	Stadium: Městský stadion Attendance: 1,754; Referee: Ondřej Pechanec

28 April 2024 30	Zlín	0–1	Karviná	Zlín
15:00 CEST (UTC+2)		Report	Regáli 12'	Stadium: Letná Stadion; Attendance: 3,910; Referee: Ondřej Berka

==== Relegation group ====
Pos	Team	Pld	W	D	L	GF	GA	GD	Pts	Qualification or relegation	JAB	PCE	BOH	KAR	CBU	ZLN
11	Jablonec	35	9	14	12	45	50	−5	41		—	3–0	—	3–2	—	1–0
12	Pardubice	35	11	7	17	39	47	−8	40		—	—	—	4–0	3–2	2–0
13	Bohemians 1905	35	9	12	14	34	48	−14	39		1–1	0–1	—	1–3	—	—
14	Karviná (O)	35	8	8	19	38	62	−24	32	Qualification for the relegation play-offs	—	—	—	—	1–0	2–2
15	České Budějovice (O)	35	7	8	20	41	70	−29	29	Qualification for the relegation play-offs	2–2	—	2–1	—	—	—
16	Zlín (R)	35	5	12	18	40	69	−29	27	Relegation to FNL	—	—	1–2	—	1–1	—

Source: Fortuna Liga
Legend: Blue = home team win; Yellow = draw; Red = away team win.
Rules for classification: 1) Total points; 2) Points earned in regular season; 3) Head-to-head points (regular season); 4) Head-to-head goal difference (regular season); 5) Head-to-head goals scored (regular season); 5) Goal difference (all matches); 6) Goals scored (all matches); 7) Fair-play ranking; 8) Draw.
(O) Play-off winners; (R) Relegated

===== Results by round =====
Round	1	2	3	4	5
Ground	A	H	A	A	H
Result	L	D	W	L	W
Position	15	15	14	14	14

Source: Fortuna Liga
A = Away; H = Home; W = Win; D = Draw; L = Loss

===== Matches =====
4 May 2024 31	Jablonec	3–2	Karviná	Jablonec nad Nisou
15:00 CEST (UTC+2)	Polidar (yellow card) 28'; Chanturishvili 37'; Tekijaški (yellow card) 43'; Hurtado (yellow card) 59'; Martinec 89'; D. Souček (yellow card) 90+3'; Náprstek 90+6'	Report	Svozil (yellow card) 10'; Hurtado 36' (o.g.); Fleišman 60'; Vlk (coach) (yellow card) 87'	Stadium: Stadion Střelnice; Attendance: 1,843; Referee: Jan Machálek

12 May 2024 32	Karviná	2–2	Zlín	Karviná
18:00 CEST (UTC+2)	Boháč 15'; Ezeh 45+1'	Report	Bartošák 54', 90+3'	Stadium: Městský stadion Attendance: 3,525; Referee: Ladislav Szikszay

16 May 2024 33	Bohemians 1905	1–3	Karviná	Prague
17:00 CEST (UTC+2)	Matoušek 20'	Report	Mikuš 48'; Budínský 54'; Čavoš 89'	Stadium: Ďolíček; Attendance: 2,962; Referee: Dominik Starý

19 May 2024 34	Pardubice	4–0	Karviná	Pardubice
17:00 CEST (UTC+2)	Krobot 33', 51', 54'; Zlatohlávek (yellow card) 40'; Vacek (yellow card) 42'; Daněk 43'; Patrák (yellow card) 70'	Report	Čavoš (yellow card) 29'; Boháč (yellow card) 67'; Ezeh (yellow card) 75'	Stadium: CFIG Arena; Attendance: 3,112; Referee: Ondřej Berka

25 May 2024 35	Karviná	1–0	České Budějovice	Karviná
18:00 CEST (UTC+2)	Budínský 30'; Boháč (yellow card) 90+2'	Report		Stadium: Městský stadion Attendance: 2,056; Referee: Ondřej Pechanec
