= 2024–25 MFK Karviná season =

MFK Karviná
2024–25 season
- Manager: Martin Hyský
- Stadium: Městský stadion
- Czech First League: Pre-season
- Czech Cup: Pre-season
- Average home league attendance: 2,416

The 2024–25 season is the 22nd season in the history of MFK Karviná, and the club's second consecutive season in Czech First League. In addition to the domestic league, the team is scheduled to participate in the Czech Cup.

== Transfers ==
=== In ===
Pos.	Player	Transferred from	Fee	Date	Source
MF	(Greece) Giannis-Fivos Botos	(Czech Republic) Slavia Prague	Loan	19 July 2024	
MF	(Czech Republic) David Planka	(Czech Republic) Slavia Prague B	Undisclosed	19 July 2024	
MF	(The Gambia) Ebrima Singhateh	(Czech Republic) Slavia Prague B	Undisclosed	19 July 2024	

=== Out ===
Pos.	Player	Transferred to	Fee	Date	Source
GK	(Czech Republic) Vladimír Neuman	(Czech Republic) Prostějov	Loan	10 July 2024	
DF	(Czech Republic) Marek Bielan	(Czech Republic) Prostějov	Undisclosed	10 July 2024	
MF	(Nigeria) David Moses	(Czech Republic) Slavia Prague	Undisclosed	1 January 2025	
MF	(Bosnia and Herzegovina) Amar Memić	(Czech Republic) Viktoria Plzeň	€150,000	1 January 2025	

== Friendlies ==
=== Pre-season ===
26 June 2024 Friendly	Termalica Nieciecza (Poland)	0–3	(Czech Republic) Karviná	Wodzisław Śląski, Poland
11:00			Memić 36'; Kačor 53'; Ojora 62'	Stadium: Gosław Sports Center

29 June 2024 Friendly	Karviná (Czech Republic)	1–0	(Poland) GKS Tychy	Stonava
17:00	Mikuš 34'			Stadium: Stadion SK Stonava

4 July 2024 Friendly	Piast Gliwice (Poland)	2–1	(Czech Republic) Karviná	Gliwice, Poland
11:00	Félix (penalty missed) 33', 34' (pen.); Kądzior 67'		Ezeh 26'	Stadium: Piotr Wieczorek Stadium
Note: Behind closed doors

10 July 2024 Friendly	Podbeskidzie Bielsko-Biała (Poland)	3–3	(Czech Republic) Karviná
11:15	Florek 19'; Endl 53' (o.g.); Misztal 844'		Mikuš 14' (pen.), 17', 37'

13 July 2024 Friendly	MFK Skalica (Slovakia)	0–2	(Czech Republic) Karviná
14:30			Ezeh 6'; Regáli 42'

== Competitions ==
=== Overall record ===
Competition	First match	Last match	Starting round	Record							
Competition	First match	Last match	Starting round	Pld	W	D	L	GF	GA	GD	Win %
Czech First League	21 July 2024	19 April 2025	Matchday 1	0	0	0	0	0	0	+0	—
Czech Cup				0	0	0	0	0	0	+0	—
Total				0	0	0	0	0	0	+0	—

Source: Soccerway

=== Czech First League ===
==== League table ====
Pos	Team	Pld	W	D	L	GF	GA	GD	Pts	Qualification or relegation
6	Sigma Olomouc	30	12	7	11	46	41	+5	43	Qualification for the championship group
7	Slovan Liberec	30	11	9	10	45	31	+14	42	Qualification for the middle group
8	Karviná	30	11	8	11	40	52	−12	41	Qualification for the middle group
9	Hradec Králové	30	11	7	12	33	31	+2	40	Qualification for the middle group
10	Bohemians 1905	30	8	10	12	32	42	−10	34 (Note: Head to head points: Bohemians 1905 8, Mladá Boleslav 7, Teplice 1.)	Qualification for the middle group

Source: Chance Liga
Rules for classification: 1) Points; 2) Head-to-head points; 3) Head-to-head goal difference; 4) Head-to-head goals scored; 5) Goal difference; 6) Goals scored; 7) Fair-play ranking; 8) Draw.
Notes:

Pos	Team	Pld	W	D	L	GF	GA	GD	Pts	Qualification or relegation	SLA	PLZ	OST	SPA	JAB	OLO
1	Slavia Prague (C)	35	29	3	3	77	18	+59	90	Qualification for the Champions League league phase	—	4–3	3–0	2–1	—	—
2	Viktoria Plzeň	35	23	5	7	71	36	+35	74	Qualification for the Champions League second qualifying round	—	—	1–2	2–0	4–1	—
3	Baník Ostrava	35	22	5	8	58	34	+24	71	Qualification for the Europa League second qualifying round	—	—	—	3–2	1–2	0–0
4	Sparta Prague	35	19	6	10	61	44	+17	63	Qualification for the Conference League second qualifying round	—	—	—	—	1–3	1–1
5	Jablonec	35	19	6	10	60	33	+27	63		3–2	—	—	—	—	4–0
6	Sigma Olomouc	35	12	9	14	48	53	−5	45	Qualification for the Europa League play-off round (Note: The winner of the 2024–25 Czech Cup (Sigma Olomouc) qualifies for the Europa League play-off round.)	0–5	1–2	—	—	—	—

Source: Chance Liga
Legend: Blue = home team win; Yellow = draw; Red = away team win.
Rules for classification: 1) Total points; 2) Points earned in regular season; 3) Head-to-head points (regular season); 4) Head-to-head goal difference (regular season); 5) Head-to-head goals scored (regular season); 5) Goal difference (all matches); 6) Goals scored (all matches); 7) Fair-play ranking; 8) Draw.
(C) Champions
Notes:

Pos	Team	Pld	W	D	L	GF	GA	GD	Pts	Qualification or relegation	TEP	MLA	SLO	DUK	PCE	CBU
11	Teplice	35	12	8	15	41	45	−4	44		—	—	1–0	2–2	3–0	—
12	Mladá Boleslav	35	11	8	16	48	48	0	41		1–0	—	2–2	2–3	—	—
13	Slovácko	35	9	11	15	31	56	−25	38		—	—	—	3–2	1–0	0–0
14	Dukla Prague (O)	35	8	10	17	34	55	−21	34	Qualification for the relegation play-offs	—	—	—	—	2–0	2–1
15	Pardubice (O)	35	6	7	22	25	56	−31	25	Qualification for the relegation play-offs	—	2–1	—	—	—	1–0
16	České Budějovice (R)	35	0	6	29	16	86	−70	6	Relegation to FNL	0–3	1–2	—	—	—	—

Source: Chance Liga
Legend: Blue = home team win; Yellow = draw; Red = away team win.
Rules for classification: 1) Total points; 2) Points earned in regular season; 3) Head-to-head points (regular season); 4) Head-to-head goal difference (regular season); 5) Head-to-head goals scored (regular season); 5) Goal difference (all matches); 6) Goals scored (all matches); 7) Fair-play ranking; 8) Draw.
(O) Play-off winners; (R) Relegated

==== Results summary ====
Overall								Home						Away					
Pld	W	D	L	GF	GA	GD	Pts	W	D	L	GF	GA	GD	W	D	L	GF	GA	GD
0	0	0	0	0	0	0	0	0	0	0	0	0	0	0	0	0	0	0	0

Source: Chance Liga

==== Results by round ====
Round	1
Ground	A
Result	
Position	

Source: Chance Liga
A = Away; H = Home; W = Win; D = Draw; L = Loss

==== Matches ====
The match schedule was released on 20 June 2024.

21 July 2024 1	Karviná	1-3	Slovan Liberec	Karviná
14:30 CEST	Regáli 4'	Report	Višinský 26'; Ševínský 34'; Plechatý (yellow card) 72'; Kováč (yellow card) 73'; Tupta 87'	Stadium: Městský stadion Attendance: 2,592; Referee: (Czech Republic) Dominik Starý

27 July 2024 2	Pardubice	0-1	Karviná	Pardubice
17:00 CEST	Tomáš Polyák (yellow card) 78'; Mohammed Yahaya (yellow card) 89'	Report	Memić 15'; Svozil (yellow card) 54'; Krčík (yellow card) 62'; David Moses (yellow card) 90+4'	Stadium: CFIG Arena; Attendance: 2,136; Referee: (Czech Republic) Vit Zaoral

11 August 2024 4	Viktoria Plzeň	5-0	Karviná	Plzeň
20:00 CEST	Vašulín 23'; Tom Slončík 30'; Dweh (yellow card) 37'; Červ 58'; Šulc 63'; Sene (red card) 72'; Jirka 87' (pen.)	Report	Fleišman (yellow card) 22'; Patrik Čavoš (red card) 26'; Botos (yellow card) 54'; Andrija Ražnatović (yellow card) 86'; Dominik Žák (yellow card) 90+1'	Stadium: Doosan Arena; Attendance: 9,087; Referee: (Czech Republic) Ondřej Pechanec

17 August 2024 5	Karviná	1-2	Bohemians 1905	Karviná
17:00 CEST	Vecheta 9'; Fleišman (yellow card) 69'	Report	Matoušek 1'; Vojtěch Smrž (yellow card) 4'; Abdulla Yusuf Helal 38'; Lukáš Soukup (yellow card) 80'; Jánoš (yellow card) 90+2'	Stadium: Městský stadion Attendance: 1,716; Referee: (Czech Republic) Pavel Orel

24 August 2024 6	Teplice	1-3	Karviná	Teplice
17:00 CEST	Mićević (yellow card) 38'; Robert Jukl (yellow card) 41'; Abdallah Gning 90'	Report	Memić 4'; Dominik Žák (yellow card) 30'; Vecheta 53' (yellow card) 61'; David Planka (yellow card) 71'; Samko 74'; David Moses (yellow card) 76'	Stadium: Na Stínadlech; Attendance: 3,268; Referee: (Czech Republic) Stanislav Volek
