= Mikúš =

Mikuš or Mikúš is a Slovak surname. Notable people with the surname include:

- Juraj Mikúš (born 1987), Slovak ice hockey player
- Juraj Mikuš (born 1988), Slovak ice hockey player
- Matúš Mikuš (born 1991), Slovak footballer
- Peter Mikuš (born 1985), Slovak ice hockey player
- Rajmund Mikuš (born 1995), Slovak footballer
- Tomáš Mikúš (born 1993), Slovak ice hockey player
