= Emmanuel Ayaosi =

Nigerian footballer (born 2004)

- Ayaosi in 2026

Personal information
- Date of birth: 28 October 2004 (age 22)
- Place of birth: Nigeria
- Position: Winger

Team information
- Current team: Slavia Prague
- Number: 20

Youth career
- Dakkada

Senior career*
Years	Team	Apps	(Gls)
2021–2023	Dakkada	37	(7)
2023–2026	Karviná	56	(6)
2026–	Slavia Prague	12	(5)
- * Club domestic league appearances and goals as of 1 November 2026

Emmanuel Ayaosi (born 28 October 2004) is a Nigerian professional footballer who plays as a winger for Czech First League club Slavia Prague.

== Career ==
Ayaosi joined the Czech club MFK Karviná in March 2023. He made his debut for Karviná against Bohemians 1905 on 11 November 2023.

Ayaosi signed a contract with Slavia Prague on 24 May 2026, valid until 2030.

== Career statistics ==
As of match played 31 October 2026

Appearances and goals by club, season and competition
Club	Season	League			Cup		Continental		Other		Total	
Club	Season	Division	Apps	Goals	Apps	Goals	Apps	Goals	Apps	Goals	Apps	Goals
Dakkada	2021–22	Nigeria Professional Football League	28	6	—		—		—		28	6
Dakkada	2022–23	Nigeria Professional Football League	9	1	—		—		—		9	1
Dakkada	Total		37	7	—		—		—		37	7
Karviná	2023–24	Czech First League	11	0	1	0	—		—		12	0
Karviná	2024–25	Czech First League	16	0	0	0	—		2 (Note: Appearances in Placement playoffs)	0	18	0
Karviná	2025–26	Czech First League	29	6	6	1	—		3	0	38	7
Karviná	Total		56	6	7	1	—		5	0	68	7
Slavia Prague	2026–27	Czech First League	11	5	1	0	3 (Note: Appearances in UEFA Champions League)	0	—		15	5
Career total			104	18	8	1	3	0	5	0	120	19

== Honours ==
MFK Karviná

- Czech Cup: 2025–26
