= David Moses =

David Moses may refer to:

- David Moses (footballer) (born 2004), Nigerian footballer
- David Lokonga Moses (fl. 2000s–2020s), South Sudanese politician
- Dai Moses (born David Moses; 1925–1999), Welsh rugby union and rugby league footballer
- Daniel David Moses (1952–2020), Canadian poet
