= Amar Memić =

Bosnian footballer (born 2001)

Personal information
- Date of birth: 20 January 2001 (age 25)
- Place of birth: Sarajevo, Bosnia and Herzegovina
- Height: 1.76 m (5 ft 9 in)
- Position: Winger

Team information
- Current team: Viktoria Plzeň
- Number: 99

Youth career
- Radnik Hadžići

Senior career*
Years	Team	Apps	(Gls)
2020–2021	Radnik Hadžići	27	(5)
2021–2022	Bravo	32	(1)
2022–2024	Karviná	75	(16)
2025–	Viktoria Plzeň	60	(10)

International career^{‡}
2021–2022	Bosnia and Herzegovina U21	5	(1)
2025–	Bosnia and Herzegovina	23	(1)
- * Club domestic league appearances and goals as of 21 November 2026 ‡ National team caps and goals as of 17 November 2026

Amar Memić (pronounced [ǎmar měmitɕ]; born 20 January 2001) is a Bosnian professional footballer who plays as a winger for Czech First League club Viktoria Plzeň and the Bosnia and Herzegovina national team.

Memić started his professional career at Radnik Hadžići, before joining Bravo in 2021. The following year, he moved to Karviná. In 2025, he signed with Viktoria Plzeň.

A former youth international for Bosnia and Herzegovina, Memić made his senior international debut in 2025, earning over 20 caps since. He represented the nation at the 2026 FIFA World Cup.

== Club career ==
=== Early career ===
Memić came through the youth setup of Radnik Hadžići. He made his professional debut against Travnik on 8 August 2020 at the age of 19. On 6 September, he scored his first professional goal in a triumph over Igman Konjic.

In July 2021, he signed with Slovenian club Bravo.

In August 2022, he joined Czech team Karviná.

In January 2025, Memić was transferred to Viktoria Plzeň.

== International career ==
Memić was a member of the Bosnia and Herzegovina under-21 team for several years.

In March 2025, he received his first senior call up, for 2026 FIFA World Cup qualifiers against Romania and Cyprus. He debuted against the former on 21 March.

On 12 October, in a friendly game against Malta, he scored his first senior international goal.

In June 2026, Memić was named in Bosnia and Herzegovina's squad for the 2026 FIFA World Cup. He made his tournament debut in the opening group match against Canada on 12 June.

== Personal life ==
Memić is a practising Muslim; together with international teammates Sead Kolašinac, Tarik Muharemović, Haris Tabaković, Nail Omerović, Salko Hamzić, Zinedin Smajlović, Nihad Mujakić, Samed Baždar and Ermin Mahmić he visited a mosque in Ilidža during the national team's concentration.

== Career statistics ==
=== Club ===
As of match played 21 November 2026

Appearances and goals by club, season and competition
Club	Season	League			National cup (Note: Includes Slovenian Cup, Czech Cup)		Continental		Other		Total	
Club	Season	Division	Apps	Goals	Apps	Goals	Apps	Goals	Apps	Goals	Apps	Goals
Radnik Hadžići	2020–21	First League of the FBiH	27	5	–		–		–		27	5
Bravo	2021–22	Slovenian PrvaLiga	32	1	2	0	–		–		34	1
Karviná	2022–23	Czech National League	26	6	2	0	–		–		28	6
Karviná	2023–24	Czech First League	30	3	0	0	–		2 (Note: Appearances in Czech First League relegation play-offs)	0	32	3
Karviná	2024–25	Czech First League	19	7	1	0	–		–		20	7
Karviná	Total		75	16	3	0	–		2	0	80	16
Viktoria Plzeň	2024–25	Czech First League	15	3	2	0	4 (Note: Appearances in UEFA Europa League)	0	–		21	3
Viktoria Plzeň	2025–26	Czech First League	30	3	0	0	14 (Note: Four appearances in UEFA Champions League; ten appearances in UEFA Europa League)	0	–		44	3
Viktoria Plzeň	2026–27	Czech First League	15	4	0	0	6	0	–		21	4
Viktoria Plzeň	Total		60	10	2	0	24	0	–		86	10
Career total			194	32	7	0	24	0	2	0	227	32

=== International ===
As of match played 17 November 2026

Appearances and goals by national team and year
National team	Year	Apps	Goals
Bosnia and Herzegovina
Bosnia and Herzegovina	2025	9	1
Bosnia and Herzegovina	2026	14	0
Total		23	1

Scores and results list Bosnia and Herzegovina's goal tally first, score column indicates score after each Memić goal.

List of international goals scored by Amar Memić
No.	Date	Venue	Cap	Opponent	Score	Result	Competition
1	12 October 2025	National Stadium, Ta' Qali, Malta	7	Malta	1–0	4–1	Friendly

== Honours ==
Karviná

- Czech National League: 2022–23
