= Daniel Bartl =

Czech football player

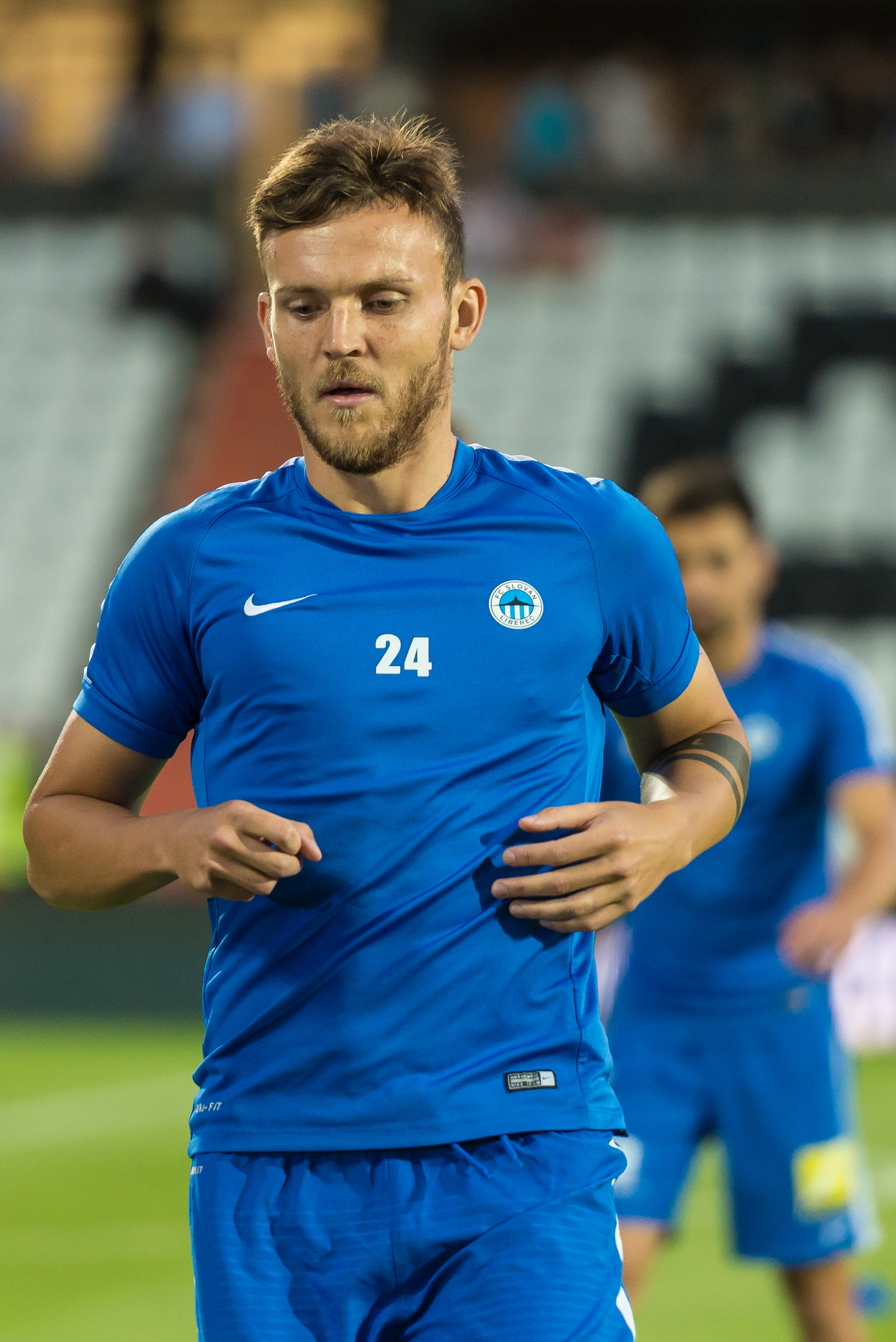

Personal information
- Date of birth: 5 July 1989 (age 37)
- Place of birth: Ostrava, Czechoslovakia
- Height: 1.83 m (6 ft 0 in)
- Position: Midfielder

Team information
- Current team: Odra Petřkovice

Senior career*
Years	Team	Apps	(Gls)
2008–2011	Baník Ostrava	1	(0)
2010	→ Zenit Čáslav (loan)	9	(0)
2011	→ Hlučín (loan)	14	(3)
2011–2013	Viktoria Žižkov	60	(8)
2013–2014	Panionios	0	(0)
2014–2015	Mladá Boleslav	26	(0)
2015–2018	Slovan Liberec	53	(5)
2018–2021	Raków Częstochowa	61	(3)
2021–2023	Karviná	46	(5)
2024–	Odra Petřkovice		
- * Club domestic league appearances and goals as of 5 July 2024

Daniel Bartl (born 5 July 1989) is a Czech professional footballer who plays as a midfielder for Odra Petřkovice.

== Honours ==
Raków Częstochowa

- I liga: 2018–19
- Polish Cup: 2020–21

MFK Karviná

- Czech National Football League: 2022–23
