= Dávid Krčík =

Slovak footballer

Personal information
- Full name: Dávid Krčík
- Date of birth: 28 June 1999 (age 27)
- Place of birth: Prievidza, Slovakia
- Height: 1.89 m (6 ft 2 in)
- Position: Centre-back

Team information
- Current team: Pardubice

Youth career
- 2008–2018: Baník Prievidza

Senior career*
Years	Team	Apps	(Gls)
2017–2019	Baník Prievidza	43	(5)
2019–2022	Tatran Liptovský Mikuláš	60	(3)
2022	→ Vysočina Jihlava	13	(4)
2022–2025	Karviná	96	(12)
2026	Viktoria Plzeň	17	(7)
2026–	Pardubice	0	(0)

International career^{‡}
2026–	Slovakia	3	(0)
- * Club domestic league appearances and goals as of 26 July 2026 ‡ National team caps and goals as of 18 November 2026

Dávid Krčík (born 28 June 1999) is a Slovak professional footballer who plays as a defender for Czech First League club Pardubice and the Slovakia national team.

== Club career ==
=== Tatran Liptovský Mikuláš ===
Krčík made his Fortuna Liga debut for Tatran Liptovský Mikuláš against Slovan Bratislava on 24 July 2021.

=== Pardubice ===
On 4 September 2026, Krčík signed a four-year contract with Czech First League club Pardubice.

== Career statistics ==
=== Club ===
As of match played 24 May 2026

Appearances and goals by club, season and competition
Club	Season	League			National cup		Europe		Other		Total	
Club	Season	Division	Apps	Goals	Apps	Goals	Apps	Goals	Apps	Goals	Apps	Goals
Baník Prievidza	2017–18	3. Liga	15	1	0	0	—		—		15	1
Baník Prievidza	2018–19	3. Liga	28	4	1	0	—		—		29	4
Baník Prievidza	Total		43	5	1	0	—		—		44	5
Tatran Liptovský Mikuláš	2019–20	2. Liga	15	0	—		—		—		15	0
Tatran Liptovský Mikuláš	2020–21	2. Liga	27	1	2	0	—		—		29	1
Tatran Liptovský Mikuláš	2021–22	Slovak First Football League	17	1	0	0	—		—		17	1
Tatran Liptovský Mikuláš	2022–23	Slovak First Football League	1	0	0	0	—		—		1	0
Tatran Liptovský Mikuláš	Total		60	2	2	0	—		—		62	2
Vysočina Jihlava	2021–22	Czech National Football League	13	4	—		—		—		13	4
Karviná	2022–23	Czech National Football League	23	2	2	0	—		—		25	2
Karviná	2023–24	Czech First League	26	2	1	0	—		—		27	2
Karviná	2024–25	Czech First League	29	2	1	0	—		—		30	2
Karviná	2025–26	Czech First League	18	6	1	0	—		—		19	6
Karviná	Total		96	12	5	0	—		—		101	12
Viktoria Plzeň	2025–26	Czech First League	16	6	1	0	—		—		17	6
Career total			228	29	9	0	0	0	0	0	237	29

=== International ===
As of match played 16 November 2026

Appearances and goals by national team and year
National team	Year	Apps	Goals
Slovakia	2026	3	0
Total		3	0

== Honours ==
MFK Karviná

- Czech National Football League: 2022–23
