= Peter Mikuš =

Slovak ice hockey player

- Born: January 10, 1985 (age 41) Trenčín, Czechoslovakia
- Height: 5 ft 10 in (178 cm)
- Weight: 185 lb (84 kg; 13 st 3 lb)
- Position: Defence
- Shoots: Left
- Slovak 1. Liga team Former teams: MHK Dubnica nad Váhom; HK Dukla Trenčín; ŠHK 37 Piešťany; HK 95 Považská Bystrica; HC Košice; HC Neftekhimik Nizhnekamsk; BK Mladá Boleslav; Motor České Budějovice; Mountfield HK; HC '05 Banská Bystrica; MsHK Žilina; VHK Vsetin; HC Nové Zámky
- Playing career: 2004–present

Peter Mikuš (born January 10, 1985) is a Slovak professional ice hockey defenceman currently playing for MHK Dubnica nad Váhom of the Slovak 1. Liga.

He played with BK Mladá Boleslav in the Czech Extraliga during the 2010–11 Czech Extraliga season.

Mikuš previously played for HK Dukla Trenčín, HC Košice and HC České Budějovice.

== Career statistics ==
=== Regular season and playoffs ===
			Regular season					Playoffs
Season	Team	League	GP	G	A	Pts	PIM	GP	G	A	Pts	PIM
