= Neil Glossoa =

French footballer (born 2004)

Personal information
- Full name: Neil Glossoa
- Date of birth: 10 September 2004 (age 22)
- Place of birth: Orsay, France
- Height: 1.88 m (6 ft 2 in)
- Positions: Centre-back; right-back; defensive midfielder

Team information
- Current team: Slavia Prague

Youth career
- 2010–2018: US Palaiseau
- 2018–2023: AJ Auxerre

Senior career*
Years	Team	Apps	(Gls)
2023–2025	AJ Auxerre B	9	(0)
2023–2025	AJ Auxerre	0	(0)
2025–2026	Pau FC	27	(0)
2026–	Slavia Prague	0	(0)
- * Club domestic league appearances and goals as of 11 May 2026

Neil Glossoa (born 10 September 2004) is a French professional footballer who plays as a centre-back, right-back, or defensive midfielder for Slavia Prague.

== Early life ==
Neil Glossoa was born in Orsay, France. He began his football career at a young age with US Palaiseau, where he played from the U7 to U13 levels. In 2018, at the age of 13, he joined the youth academy of AJ Auxerre, one of France's renowned clubs for youth development.

== Club career ==
=== AJ Auxerre ===
Glossoa progressed through the Auxerre youth ranks and established himself as a versatile defensive player. Initially a midfielder, he adapted to playing as a right-back and centre-back. He played for Auxerre's reserve team in the Championnat National 2, appearing in 9 matches during the 2023–24 season.

On 15 December 2023, Glossoa signed his first professional contract with AJ Auxerre, a milestone praised by the club's director of youth development and coaching staff. He also made his professional debut in a Coupe de France match against Saint-Mézéry during the same period.

=== Pau FC ===
In June 2025, Glossoa signed with Ligue 2 side Pau FC, seeking to gain more first-team experience and continue his development at a higher competitive level. Pau FC values his athleticism and tactical versatility, which allow him to cover multiple defensive and midfield roles.

=== Slavia Prague ===
On 4 June 2026, Glossoa signed a contract with Czech First League club Slavia Prague until 2031.

== Playing style ==
Glossoa is noted for his athleticism, adaptability, and defensive awareness. Comfortable both as a central defender and right-back, he can also contribute in a defensive midfield role, offering tactical flexibility to his coaches.

== Personal life ==
Born in France, Glossoa holds dual nationality with Côte d'Ivoire.
