= David Moses (footballer) =

Nigerian footballer (born 2004)

Personal information
- Date of birth: 20 January 2004 (age 22)
- Place of birth: Nigeria
- Height: 1.71 m (5 ft 7 in)
- Position: Central midfielder

Team information
- Current team: Slavia Prague
- Number: 16

Youth career
- –2022: Central Academy
- 2022–2023: Karviná

Senior career*
Years	Team	Apps	(Gls)
2023–2024	Karviná	41	(0)
2025–	Slavia Prague	49	(2)
- * Club domestic league appearances and goals as of 31 October 2026

David Moses (born 20 January 2004) is a Nigerian professional footballer who plays as a midfielder for Czech First League club Slavia Prague.

== Early life ==
David Moses was born on 20 January 2004.

== Career ==
Moses came to the Czech club MFK Karviná in March 2022. He first played for the youth team, then for the B team, and from the spring of 2023 for the A team. He helped his team promote to the Czech First League. In December 2024, he transferred to Slavia Prague. On 14 May 2026, Moses was banned by the LFA Disciplinary commission for eight matches after he elbowed defender Petr Hodouš to the head and broke his jaw in the away match against Slovan Liberec.

== Style of play ==
Moses plays mostly as a central or right midfielder. He is valued for his good movement and technique, and for his versatility in both attack and defence. It is estimated that as of December 2025, he is among the most valuable players of the Czech First League.

== Career statistics ==
As of match played 31 October 2026

Appearances and goals by club, season and competition
Club	Season	League			Czech Cup		Europe		Other		Total	
Club	Season	Division	Apps	Goals	Apps	Goals	Apps	Goals	Apps	Goals	Apps	Goals
Karviná	2022–23	Czech National Football League	5	0	1	0	—		—		6	0
Karviná	2023–24	Czech First League	23	0	0	0	—		—		23	0
Karviná	2024–25	Czech First League	13	0	1	0	—		—		14	0
Karviná	Total		41	0	2	0	—		—		43	0
Slavia Prague	2024–25	Czech First League	15	1	2	0	—		—		17	1
Slavia Prague	2025–26	Czech First League	26	1	2	0	5 (Note: Appearances in UEFA Champions League)	0	—		33	1
Slavia Prague	2026–27	Czech First League	8	0	1	0	2	0	—		11	0
Slavia Prague	Total		49	2	5	0	7	0	—		61	2
Career total			92	2	7	0	7	0	0	0	106	2

== Honours ==
Karviná

- Czech National Football League: 2022–23

Slavia Prague

- Czech First League: 2024–25, 2025–26
