= Samuel Obinaya =

Ukrainian footballer

Personal information
- Full name: Samuel Stivovych Obinaya
- Date of birth: 28 August 2005 (age 21)
- Place of birth: Kharkiv, Ukraine
- Height: 1.84 m (6 ft 0 in)
- Position: Midfielder

Team information
- Current team: Jablonec B (on loan from Metalist 1925 Kharkiv)
- Number: 20

Youth career
- 2014–2018: Metalist Kharkiv
- 2018–2023: Metalist 1925 Kharkiv

Senior career*
Years	Team	Apps	(Gls)
2023–	Metalist 1925 Kharkiv	17	(0)
2024	→ Metalist 1925-2 Kharkiv	6	(2)
2025–	→ Jablonec (loan)	0	(0)
2025–	→ Jablonec B (loan)	12	(0)

International career^{‡}
2024	Ukraine U19	3	(0)
- * Club domestic league appearances and goals as of 4 January 2026 ‡ National team caps and goals as of 13 November 2025

Samuel Stivovych Obinaya (Ukrainian: Самуель Стівович Обінайя; born 28 August 2005) is a Ukrainian professional footballer who plays as a midfielder for Bohemian Football League club Jablonec B on loan from Metalist 1925 Kharkiv.

== Club career ==
Born in Kharkiv, Obinaya began his career in the local Metalist Kharkiv youth school, then he continued in the Metalist 1925 Kharkiv, joining it in September 2018, where he played in the Ukrainian Premier League Reserves.

He made his debut as a second half-time a substitute for Metalist 1925 in the Ukrainian Premier League in a home match against Dynamo Kyiv on 25 February 2024.

On 8 September 2025, Obinaya joined Czech First League club Jablonec on a one-year loan deal with an option to make transfer permanent.

== International career ==
In July 2024, Obinaya was called up by manager Dmytro Mykhaylenko to the final squad of the Ukraine national under-19 football team to play in the 2024 UEFA European Under-19 Championship tournament matches.
