= Ange N'Guessan (footballer, born 2003) =

French footballer (born 2000)

- N'Guessan in 2026

Personal information
- Full name: Ange Caumenan N'Guessan
- Date of birth: 1 September 2003 (age 23)
- Place of birth: Paris, France
- Height: 1.87 m (6 ft 2 in)
- Position: Defender

Team information
- Current team: Slavia Prague
- Number: 6

Youth career
- –2016: Créteil
- 2016–2021: Lens
- 2022–2023: Torino

Senior career*
Years	Team	Apps	(Gls)
2020	Lens II	4	(0)
2023–2025	Torino	0	(0)
2024	→ Ternana (loan)	0	(0)
2024–2025	Bravo	26	(1)
2025–2026	Slovan Liberec	31	(3)
2026–	Slavia Prague	8	(1)
- * Club domestic league appearances and goals as of 1 November 2026

Ange Caumenan N'Guessan (born 1 September 2003) is a French professional footballer who plays as a defender for Slavia Prague.

== Career ==
As a youth player, N'Guessan joined the youth academy of French side Créteil. Following his stint there, he joined the youth academy of Italian Serie A side Torino in 2022 and was promoted to the club's senior team in 2023, where he made zero league appearances and scored zero goals. Six months later, he was sent on loan to Italian side Ternana, where he made zero league appearances and scored zero goals.

Subsequently, he was sent on loan to Slovenian side Bravo in 2024, where he made twenty-six league appearances and scored one goal and helped the club achieve fifth place in the league. During the summer of 2025, he signed for Czech side Liberec, where he made thirty-one league appearances and scored three goals. Ahead of the 2026–27 season, he signed for Czech side Slavia Prague.

== Style of play ==
N'Guessan plays as a defender. Czech newspaper Blesk wrote in 2026 that he is a "central defender, suitable for a central three. Fast, combative".

== Personal life ==
Born in France, N'Guessan is of Ivorian descent.

== Career statistics ==
=== Club ===
As of match played 31 October 2026

Appearances and goals by club, season and competition
Club	Season	League			Cup		Europe		Other		Total	
Club	Season	Division	Apps	Goals	Apps	Goals	Apps	Goals	Apps	Goals	Apps	Goals
Lens	2020–21	National 1	4	0	—		—		—		4	0
Torino	2022–23	Serie A	0	0	0	0	—		—		0	0
Torino	2023–24	Serie A	0	0	0	0	—		—		0	0
Torino	2024–25	Serie A	0	0	0	0	—		—		0	0
Torino	Total		0	0	0	0	—		—		0	0
Ternana (loan)	2023–24	Serie B	0	0	—		—		1 (Note: Appearances in Serie B play-offs)	0	1	0
Bravo	2024–25	Slovenian PrvaLiga	26	1	3	0	—		—		29	1
Slovan Liberec	2025–26	Czech First League	28	0	1	0	—		—		29	0
Slavia Prague	2026–27	Czech First League	8	1	0	0	2 (Note: Appearances in UEFA Champions League)	0	—		10	1
Career total			66	2	4	0	2	0	1	0	73	2
