= Lucky Ezeh =

Nigerian footballer (born 2004)

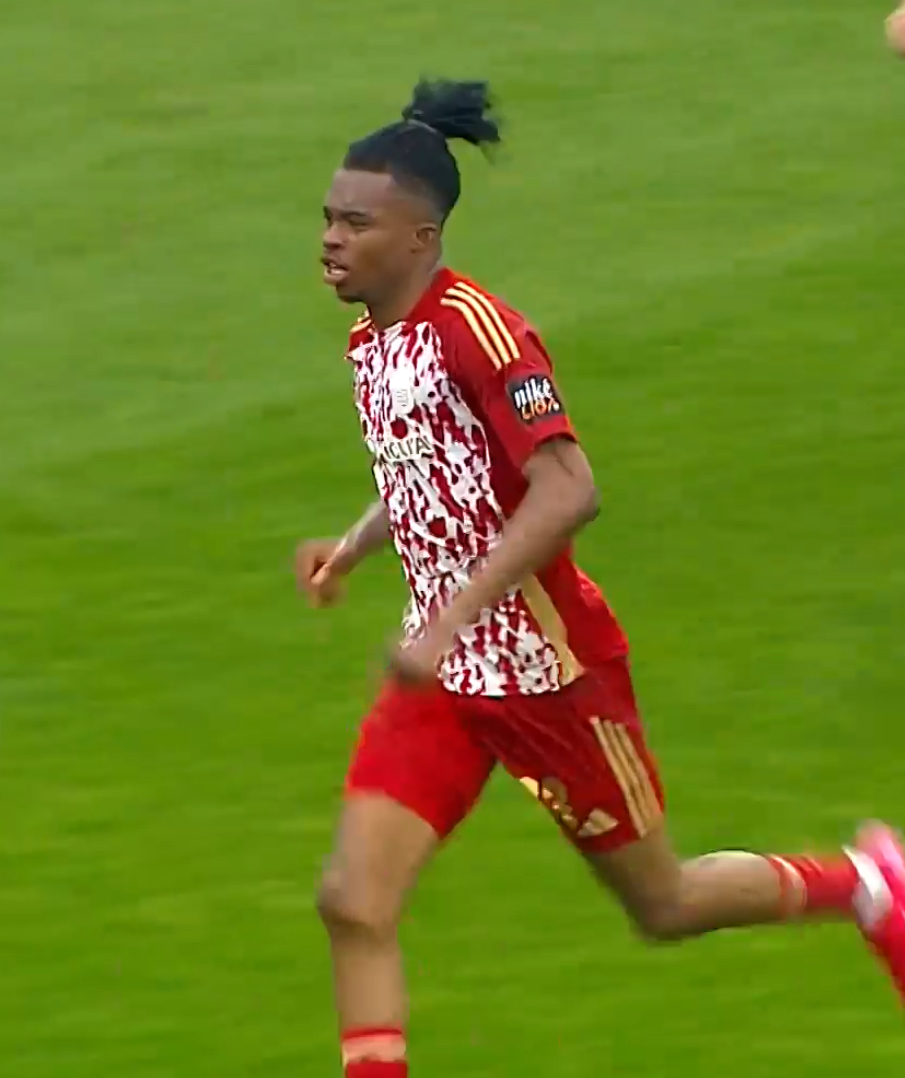
- Ezeh in 2025

Personal information
- Date of birth: 23 January 2004 (age 22)
- Place of birth: Plateau Nigeria
- Height: 1.87 m (6 ft 2 in)
- Position: Forward

Team information
- Current team: Zbrojovka Brno
- Number: 77

Youth career
- Atlético Madrid
- Karviná

Senior career*
Years	Team	Apps	(Gls)
2022–2025	Karviná B	15	(7)
2022–2026	Karviná	78	(7)
2025	→ Banská Bystrica (loan)	12	(5)
2026–	Zbrojovka Brno	0	(0)
- * Club domestic league appearances and goals as of 27 May 2026

Lucky Ezeh (born 23 January 2004) is a Nigerian professional footballer who plays as a forward for Czech First League club Zbrojovka Brno.

== Early life ==
Ezeh was born in Plateau State, Nigeria.

== Club career ==
=== Atlético Madrid ===
Ezeh played for the Abuja-based FC TBC football academy in Nigeria, from where he left to join the Atlético Madrid academy in the winter of 2021.

=== MFK Karviná ===
Ezeh made his debut in a 2–2 draw against FK Třinec, coming on as a substitute for Amar Memić in the 79th minute. On 24 May 2023, he scored his first goal in his career, and for Karviná, scoring in the 84th minute to tie the game 2–2 against FK Varnsdorf. On 21 October 2023, he scored the winning goal in a 1–0 win over Hradec Králové. During his time in the Karviná jersey, he alternated between the A and B teams.

=== Banská Bystrica ===
On 21 February 2025, it was announced that Dukla Banská Bystrica were signing Ezeh on a six-month loan. He played his first game for Bystrica in a 1–0 loss to Zemplín Michalovce, coming on as a substitute in the 61th minute for Tibor Slebodník. Ezeh scored his first goal for the club in a 2–1 loss to KFC Komárno. He scored a brace in a 3–3 draw against Zemplín Michalovce. During his time with Dukla Banská Bystrica, Ezeh scored five goals and provided one assist in 12 league games. Despite good form for Dukla, he was not able to prevent their relegation.

=== Return to Karviná ===
In 2025, Ezeh returned to Karviná. On 23 September 2025, he scored four goals in a 6–1 away win in the cup against FC Silon Táborsko. Ezeh scored the third goal in a 4–3 win against FC Hradec Králové after coming on off the bench in the 85th minute.

=== Zbrojovka Brno ===
On 13 June 2026, Ezeh signed a multi-year contract with Zbrojovka Brno.

== Honours ==
Karviná

- Czech Cup: 2025–26
