= Rajmund Mikuš =

Slovak footballer

Personal information
- Date of birth: 29 November 1995 (age 30)
- Place of birth: Dunajská Streda, Slovakia
- Height: 1.81 m (5 ft 11 in)
- Positions: Attacking midfielder; forward

Team information
- Current team: Dukla Prague
- Number: 10

Youth career
- –2011: Šamorín
- 2011–2014: Slovan Bratislava

Senior career*
Years	Team	Apps	(Gls)
2014−2015	Slovan Bratislava B	19	(2)
2015	Šamorín		
2016	Šaľa	14	(2)
2016−2018	Nová Dubnica		
2016−2018	→ Nové Mesto n. Váhom (loan)	55	(19)
2018−2019	Dubnica	29	(10)
2019−2020	Jihlava	24	(6)
2020−2025	Karviná	104	(11)
2025	→ Dukla Prague (loan)	17	(3)
2025−	Dukla Prague	7	(1)
- * Club domestic league appearances and goals as of 15 May 2026

Rajmund Mikuš (born 29 November 1995) is a Slovak professional footballer who plays for Dukla Prague as a midfielder.

== Club career ==
Mikuš made his professional Czech First League debut for MFK Karviná against FC Baník Ostrava on 23 August 2020.

== Honours ==
MFK Karviná

- Czech National Football League: 2022–23
