= Papalélé =

Cape Verdean footballer

Personal information
- Full name: Hélio Alberto Delgado Silva
- Date of birth: 16 May 1998 (age 28)
- Place of birth: São Vicente, Cape Verde
- Height: 1.78 m (5 ft 10 in)
- Position: Forward

Team information
- Current team: Artis Brno
- Number: 17

Youth career
- –2016: Mindelense
- 2019–2020: Porto

Senior career*
Years	Team	Apps	(Gls)
2016–2019	Mindelense		
2020	Porto B	2	(0)
2020–2021	Leixões	5	(0)
2021–2022	Montalegre	25	(6)
2022–2023	Estrela da Amadora	2	(0)
2022–2023	→ Anadia (loan)	24	(6)
2023–2024	Karviná	13	(1)
2024–2026	Opava	53	(9)
2026–	Artis Brno	0	(0)

International career^{‡}
2019–	Cape Verde	2	(1)
- * Club domestic league appearances and goals as of 28 May 2026 ‡ National team caps and goals as of 01:14, 29 October 2020 (UTC)

Hélio Alberto Delgado Silva (born 16 March 1998), commonly known as Papalélé, is a Cape Verdean professional footballer who plays as a forward for Czech First League club Artis Brno.

== Career statistics ==
=== Club ===
As of 29 October 2020

Appearances and goals by club, season and competition
Club	Season	League			National cup		League cup		Other		Total	
Club	Season	Division	Apps	Goals	Apps	Goals	Apps	Goals	Apps	Goals	Apps	Goals
Porto B	2019–20	LigaPro	2	0	—		—		0	0	2	0
Leixões	2020–21	LigaPro	0	0	0	0	0	0	0	0	0	0
Career total			2	0	0	0	0	0	0	0	2	0

=== International ===
As of matches played 29 October 2020.

Appearances and goals by national team and year
National team	Year	Apps	Goals
Cape Verde	2019	2	1
Cape Verde	2020	0	0
Total		2	1

Scores and results list Cape Verde's goal tally first, score column indicates score after each Papalélé goal.

List of international goals scored by Papalélé
No.	Date	Venue	Opponent	Score	Result	Competition
1	3 August 2019	Stade Olympique, Nouakchott, Mauritania	Mauritania	1–2	1–2	2020 African Nations Championship qualification
