= Městský stadion (Karviná) =

Football stadium in the Czech Republic

Městský stadion Karviná
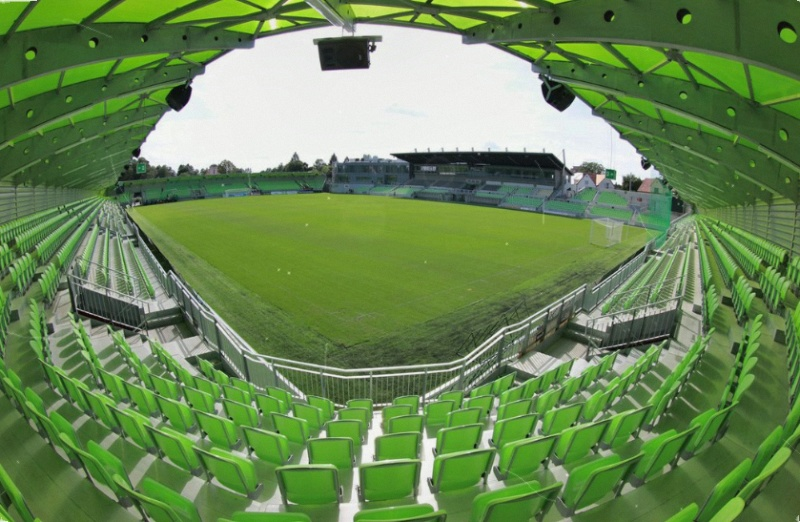
- Městský stadion Karviná
- Interactive map of Městský stadion Karviná
- Former names: Stadion TJ Jäkl Karviná
- Location: U Hřiště 318, Karviná, Czech Republic, 734 01
- Coordinates: 49°50′43″N 18°33′41″E
- Owner: Město Karviná
- Capacity: 4,833
- Field size: 105 x 68 m

Construction
- Opened: 1952
- Renovated: 2016
- Cost: 144,800,000 CZK
- Architect: Ján Fiľo

Tenant
- MFK Karviná

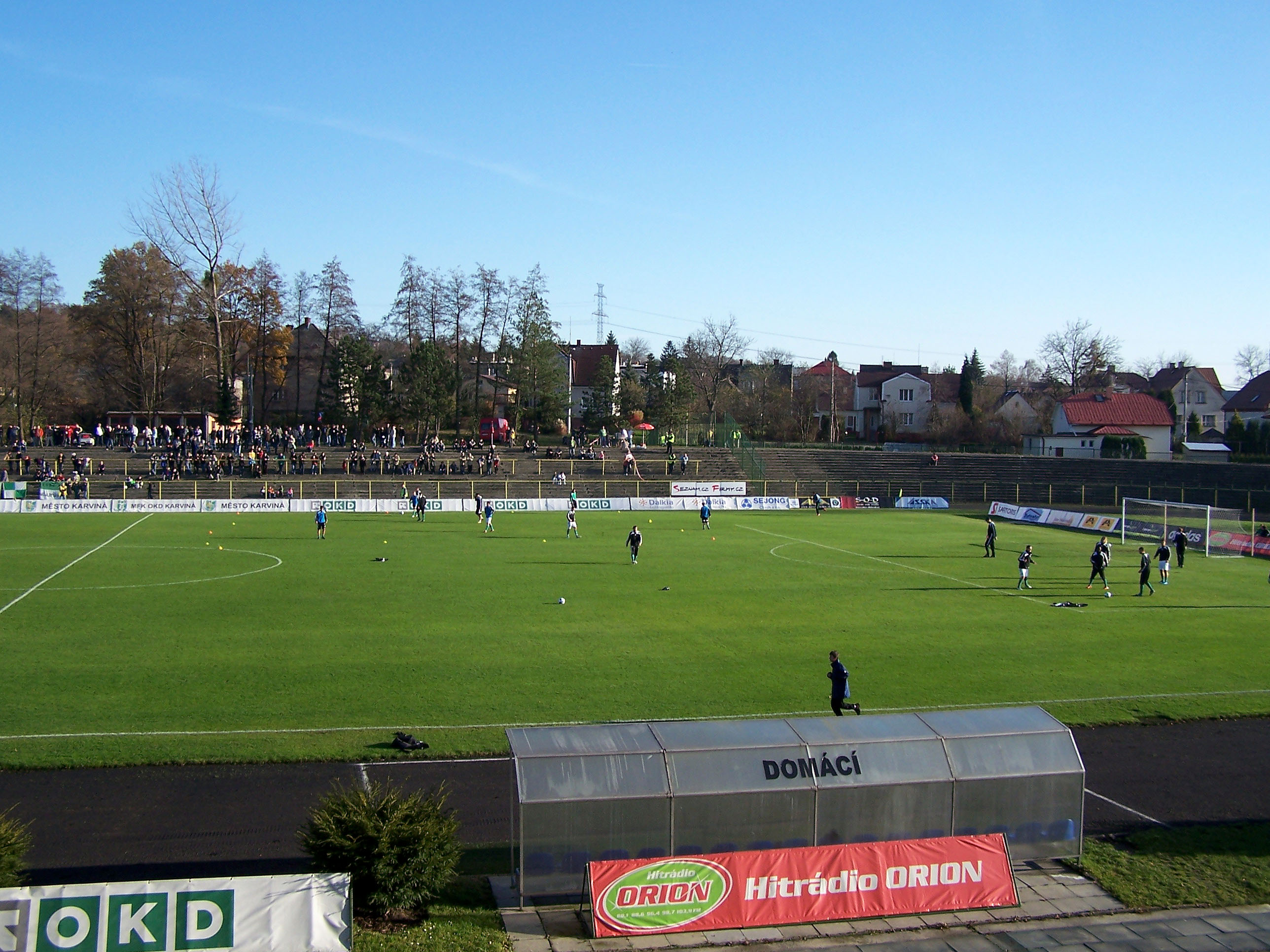
The stadium before the 2016 reconstruction

Městský stadion Karviná is a football stadium in Karviná-Ráj in the Czech Republic. It is the home stadium of MFK Karviná. The stadium holds 4,833 spectators, all of which can be seated.

== International matches ==
Městský stadion has hosted one friendly match of the Czech Republic national football team

13 November 2025 Friendly	Czech Republic	1–0	San Marino	Karviná, Czech Republic
18:00 UTC+1	Souček 40'	Report		Stadium: Městský stadion Attendance: 3,721; Referee: Paweł Raczkowski (Poland)
