= 2022–23 Czech National Football League =

Czech National Football League
- Season: 2022–23
- Dates: 29 July 2022 – 28 May 2023
- Champions: Karviná
- Promoted: Karviná
- Relegated: Třinec; Slavia Prague B
- Matches: 240
- Goals: 666 (2.78 per match)
- Top goalscorer: Tomáš Wágner (17 goals)
- Biggest home win: Vlašim 6–1 Prostějov; 4 September 2022; Prostějov 5–0 Táborsko; 10 September 2022; Dukla 5–0 Jihlava; 30 September 2022; Příbram 5–0 Olomouc B 30 September 2022; Karviná 5–0 Dukla; 23 October 2022; Varnsdorf 7–2 Jihlava; 19 April 2023; Karviná 5–0 Prostějov; 7 May 2023; Slavia B 7–2 Jihlava; 14 May 2023; Jihlava 5–0 Vlašim; 28 May 2023
- Biggest away win: Olomouc B 0–5 Vlašim; 16 October 2022
- Highest scoring: Varnsdorf 7–2 Jihlava; 19 April 2023; Slavia B 7–2 Jihlava; 14 May 2023

The 2022–23 Czech National Football League (known as the Fortuna národní liga for sponsorship reasons) is the 30th season of the Czech Republic's second tier football league. The season started on 29 July 2022.

The season format is unchanged from last season, each team will play in the league format home and away matches. The top-ranked team will we promoted to the Czech First League, the two teams positioned 2nd and 3rd will play a play-out with two teams from the first league positioned 14th and 15th in a home and away format. The two lowest-ranked teams will be relegated directly to the third tier.

== Team changes ==
=== From FNL ===
- FC Zbrojovka Brno (promoted to 2022–23 Czech First League)
- FK Ústí nad Labem (relegated to 2022–23 Bohemian Football League)
- FK Viktoria Žižkov (relegated to 2022–23 Bohemian Football League)

=== To FNL ===
- MFK Karviná (relegated from 2021–22 Czech First League)
- SK Slavia Prague B (promoted from 2021–22 Bohemian Football League)
- SK Sigma Olomouc B (promoted from 2021–22 Moravian-Silesian Football League)

== Team overview ==
Location of clubs in the 2022–23 2. Liga

=== Locations and stadiums ===
The home stadium of MFK Vyškov was not certified by the league to host matches. The club opted to play their home league matches for the season at Sportovní areál Drnovice in Drnovice.

Club	Location	Stadium	Capacity	2021–22 position
MFK Karviná	Karviná	Městský stadion (Karviná)	4,833	16th in First League
FC Sellier & Bellot Vlašim	Vlašim	Stadion Kollárova ulice	6,000	2nd
SFC Opava	Opava	Stadion v Městských sadech	7,758	3rd
SK Líšeň	Brno	Stadion SK Líšeň	2,000	4th
AC Sparta Prague B	Prague	FK Viktoria Stadion	5,037	5th
FK Varnsdorf	Varnsdorf	Městský stadion v Kotlině	5,000	6th
FC Vysočina Jihlava	Jihlava	Stadion v Jiráskově ulici	4,500	7th
FC Silon Táborsko	Tábor	Stadion Kvapilova	1,500	8th
FK Dukla Prague	Prague	Stadion Juliska	8,150	9th
MFK Chrudim	Chrudim	Za Vodojemem	1,500	10th
1. SK Prostějov	Prostějov	Stadion Za Místním nádražím	3,500	11th
MFK Vyškov	Vyškov	Sportovní areál Drnovice	4,500	12th
FK Viagem Příbram	Příbram	Na Litavce	9,100	13th
FK Třinec	Třinec	Stadion Rudolfa Labaje	2,200	14th
SK Slavia Prague B	Prague	Na Chvalech	3,500	1st in ČFL
SK Sigma Olomouc B	Olomouc	Andrův stadion	12,483	1st in MSFL

== League table ==
Pos	Team	Pld	W	D	L	GF	GA	GD	Pts	Promotion or relegation
1	Karviná (C, P)	30	17	5	8	58	37	+21	56	Promotion to 2023–24 Czech First League
2	Vyškov	30	14	10	6	45	29	+16	52	Qualification for promotion play-offs
3	Příbram	30	14	9	7	48	32	+16	51	Qualification for promotion play-offs
4	Dukla Prague	30	14	5	11	51	45	+6	47	
5	Líšeň	30	13	7	10	38	27	+11	46	
6	Varnsdorf	30	12	7	11	54	46	+8	43	
7	Táborsko	30	11	9	10	39	43	−4	42	
8	Chrudim	30	8	15	7	32	32	0	39	
9	Sigma Olomouc B	30	10	9	11	41	46	−5	39	
10	Sparta Prague B	30	11	6	13	32	39	−7	39	
11	Vlašim	30	11	5	14	54	49	+5	38	
12	Prostějov	30	9	9	12	39	57	−18	36	
13	Opava	30	8	10	12	26	29	−3	34	
14	Vysočina Jihlava	30	9	7	14	37	51	−14	34	
15	Slavia Prague B (R)	30	8	8	14	42	56	−14	32	Relegation to 2023–24 ČFL
16	Třinec (R)	30	6	9	15	30	48	−18	27	Relegation to 2023–24 MSFL

Source: Fortuna národní liga
Rules for classification: 1) Points; 2) Head-to-head points; 3) Head-to-head goal difference; 4) Head-to-head goals scored; 5) Goal difference; 6) Goals scored; 7) Play-off (if deciding promotion or relegation); 8) Draw
(C) Champions; (P) Promoted; (R) Relegated

== Top scorers ==
Rank	Player	Club	Goals
1	(Czech Republic) Tomáš Wágner	Příbram	17
2	(Czech Republic) Jan Suchan	Vlašim	15
2	(Nigeria) Abdullahi Tanko	Varnsdorf	15
4	(Czech Republic) Lukáš Matějka	Dukla	14
4	(Burundi) Bienvenue Kanakimana	Vyškov	14
6	(Serbia) Bojan Djordjić	Varnsdorf / Táborsko	11
6	(Czech Republic) Štěpán Beran	Slavia B	11
6	(Czech Republic) Pavel Osmančík	Příbram / Varnsdorf	11
9	(Czech Republic) Jaroslav Málek	Karviná	10
9	(Czech Republic) Jan Koudelka	Prostějov	10

== Attendances ==
#	Club	Average
1	Opava	1,493
2	Karviná	1,353
3	Táborsko	892
4	Chrudim	812
5	Příbram	765
6	Vyškov	764
7	Dukla	755
8	Líšeň	687
9	Varnsdorf	621
10	Sparta Praha B	586
11	Prostějov	571
12	Vysočina	570
13	Slavia Praha B	505
14	Třinec	480
15	Vlašim	410
16	Sigma Olomouc B	393

== See also ==
- 2022–23 Czech Cup
- 2022–23 Czech First League
