= 2023–24 FC Slovan Liberec season =

Slovan Liberec
2023–24 season
- Manager: Luboš Kozel
- Stadium: Stadion u Nisy
- Czech First League: 7th
- Czech Cup: Quarter-finals
- Top goalscorer: League: Luka Kulenović (7); All: Luka Kulenović; Ľubomír Tupta (7 each)
- Average home league attendance: 3,091
colours	colours

The 2023–24 season is FC Slovan Liberec's 66th season in existence and 31st consecutive in the Czech First League. They will also compete in the Czech Cup.

== Players ==
=== First-team squad ===
As of 6 September 2023

Note: Flags indicate national team as defined under FIFA eligibility rules; some limited exceptions apply. Players may hold more than one non-FIFA nationality.

No.	Pos.	Nation	Player
1	GK	BEL	Olivier Vliegen
2	DF	CZE	Dominik Plechatý (on loan from Sparta Prague)
3	DF	CZE	Jan Mikula
4	DF	BEL	Milan Govaers
5	MF	CZE	Denis Višinský
6	MF	UKR	Ivan Varfolomeyev
7	FW	CZE	Michael Rabušic
8	MF	CZE	Lukáš Červ
9	MF	CZE	Jakub Hudák
10	FW	SVK	Ľubomír Tupta
11	MF	CZE	Christián Frýdek
14	FW	CZE	Filip Horský (on loan from Slavia Prague)
15	MF	CIV	Mohamed Doumbia
17	DF	CZE	Ondřej Lehoczki

No.	Pos.	Nation	Player
18	MF	CZE	Michal Lexa
19	MF	CZE	Nicolas Penner
20	DF	CZE	Dominik Preisler
21	FW	NGR	Chidera Okoh (on loan from Mosta)
22	MF	CZE	Tomáš Polyák
24	DF	CZE	Michal Fukala
25	MF	NGR	Ahmad Ghali
26	FW	BIH	Luka Kulenović
28	MF	CZE	Jan Žambůrek (on loan from Viborg)
30	DF	CZE	Filip Prebsl (on loan from Slavia Prague)
31	GK	CZE	Hugo Jan Bačkovský
32	GK	CZE	Lukáš Hasalík
33	DF	GRE	Marios Pourzitidis
37	DF	CZE	Matěj Chaluš (on loan from Malmö)

=== Out on loan ===
Note: Flags indicate national team as defined under FIFA eligibility rules; some limited exceptions apply. Players may hold more than one non-FIFA nationality.

No.	Pos.	Nation	Player
—	GK	CZE	Lukáš Pešl (at Varnsdorf)
—	MF	CZE	Kristian Michal (at Varnsdorf)

No.	Pos.	Nation	Player
—	MF	CZE	Dominik Gembický (at Varnsdorf)

== Transfers ==
=== In ===
Pos.	Player	Transferred from	Fee	Date	Source

=== Out ===
Pos.	Player	Transferred to	Fee	Date	Source

== Pre-season and friendlies ==
Win Draw Loss Fixtures

23 June 2023 Friendly	Slovan Liberec (Czech Republic)	2–0	(Czech Republic) Příbram	Benátky nad Jizerou
15:30				Stadium: Městský stadion

24 June 2023 Friendly	Slovan Liberec (Czech Republic)	0–2	(Czech Republic) Mladá Boleslav
13:30

1 July 2023 Friendly	Lech Poznań (Poland)	1–3	(Czech Republic) Slovan Liberec	Poznań, Poland
17:00				Stadium: Boisko Treningowe przy Bułgarskiej

5 July 2023 Friendly	Slovan Liberec (Czech Republic)	4–0	(Czech Republic) FK Varnsdorf	Raspenava
11:00				Stadium: Hřiště Raspenava

7 July 2023 Friendly	Slovan Liberec (Czech Republic)	0–2	(Czech Republic) Jihlava	Nymburk
11:00				Stadium: Sportovní Areál Nymburk

12 July 2023 Friendly	Slovan Liberec (Czech Republic)	4–1	(Hungary) Puskás Akadémia
17:00

14 July 2023 Friendly	Fortuna Düsseldorf (Germany)	2–1	(Czech Republic) Slovan Liberec	Bad Wimsbach, Austria
17:00				Stadium: HF-Stadion Bad Wimsbach

13 October 2023 Friendly	Chrobry Głogów (Poland)	0–4	(Czech Republic) Slovan Liberec	Żagań, Poland
12:15				Stadium: Arena Żagań

13 January 2024 Friendly	Slovan Liberec (Czech Republic)	3–0	(Poland) Miedź Legnica	Liberec
12:00				Stadium: UMT Doubí

== Competitions ==
=== Overall record ===
Competition	First match	Last match	Starting round	Final position	Record							
Competition	First match	Last match	Starting round	Final position	Pld	W	D	L	GF	GA	GD	Win %
Czech First League	23 July 2023	28 April 2024	Matchday 1	7th	30	10	10	10	46	46	+0	33.33
Czech First League play-off	5 May 2024	12 May 2024	First round	First round	2	0	0	2	1	4	−3	0.00
Czech Cup	30 August 2023	28 February 2024	Second round	Quarter-finals	3	2	0	1	4	2	+2	66.67
Total					35	12	10	13	51	52	−1	34.29

Source: Soccerway

=== Czech First League ===
==== Results summary ====
Overall								Home						Away					
Pld	W	D	L	GF	GA	GD	Pts	W	D	L	GF	GA	GD	W	D	L	GF	GA	GD
30	10	10	10	46	46	0	40	9	3	3	30	18	+12	1	7	7	16	28	−12

Source: Fortuna Liga

==== Regular season ====
===== Table =====
Pos	Team	Pld	W	D	L	GF	GA	GD	Pts	Qualification or relegation
5	Mladá Boleslav	30	12	8	10	50	46	+4	44	Qualification for the Championship group
6	Slovácko	30	11	8	11	39	40	−1	41	Qualification for the Championship group
7	Slovan Liberec	30	10	10	10	46	46	0	40	Qualification for the Play-off
8	Sigma Olomouc	30	10	7	13	40	45	−5	37	Qualification for the Play-off
9	Hradec Králové	30	9	10	11	32	38	−6	37	Qualification for the Play-off

Source: Fortuna Liga
Rules for classification: 1) Points; 2) Head-to-head points; 3) Head-to-head goal difference; 4) Head-to-head goals scored; 5) Goal difference; 6) Goals scored; 7) Fair-play ranking; 8) Draw.

===== Results by round =====
Round	1	2	3	4	5	6	7	8	9	10	11	12	13	14	15	16	17	18	19	20	21	22	23	24	25	26	27	28	29	30
Ground	H	A	H	A	H	A	H	A	H	A	H	H	A	H	A	H	A	H	A	H	A	H	A	H	A	A	H	A	H	A
Result	W	D	L	D	W	L	L	D	D	L	L	W	D	W	D	W	D	W	L	W	L	D	L	W	L	W	W	L	D	D
Position	4	6	8	9	6	8	10	10	10	11	11	9	9	8	10	8	8	8	8	6	8	7	9	8	9	7	7	7	7	7
Points	3	4	4	5	8	8	8	9	10	10	10	13	14	17	18	21	22	25	25	28	28	29	29	32	32	35	38	38	39	40

Source: Fortuna Liga
A = Away; H = Home; W = Win; D = Draw; L = Loss

===== Matches =====
The league fixtures were unveiled on 21 June 2023.

23 July 2023 1	Slovan Liberec	3–1	Baník Ostrava	Liberec
15:00 CEST (UTC+2)	Kpozo 19' (o.g.); Červ 41', (yellow card) 60'; Pourzitidis (yellow card) 49'; Doumbia 64'; Ghali (yellow card) 73'	Report	Almási (yellow card) 25'; Tetour (yellow card) 29', (goal) 47' (pen.); Ewerton (yellow card) 73'	Stadium: Stadion u Nisy; Attendance: 3,338; Referee: Jan Petřík

30 July 2023 2	Mladá Boleslav	2–2	Slovan Liberec	Mladá Boleslav
15:00 CEST (UTC+2)	Kušej (yellow card) 9'; Suchomel (yellow card) 18'; Suchý (yellow card) 25', (goal) 88'; Kostka (red card) 36'; Karafiát (yellow card) 54'; Pulkrab 78', (yellow card) 79'; Ladra (yellow card) 82'	Report	Plechatý (yellow card) 5'; Chaluš 8'; Kulenović 42'; Červ (yellow card) 82'; Prebsl (yellow card) 88'; Mikula (yellow card) 90'	Stadium: Lokotrans Aréna; Attendance: 4,112; Referee: Daniel Vokoun

6 August 2023 3	Slovan Liberec	0–1	Bohemians 1905	Liberec
15:00 CEST (UTC+2)	Doumbia (yellow card) 44'; Ghali (yellow card) 54'	Report	Matoušek (yellow card) 29'; Hůlka (yellow card) 39'; Beran (yellow card) 66'; Kozák 90+1'	Stadium: Stadion u Nisy; Attendance: 2,958; Referee: Ladislav Szikszay

12 August 2023 4	Zlín	1–1	Slovan Liberec	Zlín
15:00 CEST (UTC+2)	Janetzký 35'; Tkáč (yellow card) 45+2'; Kovinič (yellow card) 90+2'	Report	Frýdek 15'; Pourzitidis (yellow card) 30'; Kozel (coach) (yellow card) 74'; Rabušic (yellow card) 87'	Stadium: Letná Stadion; Attendance: 2,738; Referee: Karel Rouček

19 August 2023 5	Slovan Liberec	1–0	Pardubice	Liberec
15:00 CEST (UTC+2)	Frýdek 13'; Prebsl (yellow card) 90+1'	Report	Hlavatý (yellow card) 90+5'	Stadium: Stadion u Nisy; Attendance: 1,858; Referee: Dalibor Černý

27 August 2023 6	Sigma Olomouc	2–0	Slovan Liberec	Olomouc
15:00 CEST (UTC+2)	Breite (yellow card) 45+2'; Juliš 54' (pen.); Pokorný 65'; Pospíšil (yellow card) 74'; Muritala (yellow card) 82'	Report	Doumbia (yellow card) 38'	Stadium: Andrův stadion Attendance: 3,594; Referee: Petr Hocek

3 September 2023 7	Slovan Liberec	0–2	Sparta Prague	Liberec
15:00 CEST (UTC+2)	Červ (yellow card) 44'; Prebsl (yellow card) 61'; Pourzitidis (yellow card) 66' (yellow-red card) 87'; Kozel (coach) (yellow card) 67'	Report	Zelený (yellow card) 44'; Olatunji (yellow card) 50'; Haraslín 69', 77'	Stadium: Stadion u Nisy; Attendance: 7,627; Referee: Ladislav Szikszay

17 September 2023 8	Jablonec	1–1	Slovan Liberec	Jablonec nad Nisou
15:00 CEST (UTC+2)	Tekijaški (yellow card) 8', (goal) 53'; Jovović (yellow card) 31'	Report	Chaluš (yellow card) 8'; Tupta 8' (pen.); Červ (yellow card) 61'; Žambůrek (yellow card) 85'; Hudák (yellow card) 90+3'	Stadium: Stadion Střelnice; Attendance: 3,650; Referee: Ondřej Berka

23 September 2023 9	Slovan Liberec	3–3	Teplice	Liberec
15:00 CEST (UTC+2)	Chaloupek 19' (o.g.); Doumbia 27', (yellow card) 85'; Varfolomeyev 39'	Report	Knapík 9'; Havelka 11'; Mareček (yellow card) 12'; Hronek (yellow card) 45+1' (yellow-red card) 73'; Fila 51' (pen.); Jukl (yellow card) 67'; Yasser (yellow card) 89'	Stadium: Stadion u Nisy; Attendance: 2,327; Referee: Filip Kotala

30 September 2023 10	Karviná	5–2	Slovan Liberec	Karviná
15:00 CEST (UTC+2)	Čurma (yellow card) 2'; Iván 11'; Moses (yellow card) 27'; Budínský 38'; Akinyemi 41'; Memić 70', (yellow card) 90+3'; Traoré 83'	Report	Mikula 14'; Tupta 47'; Červ (yellow card) 68'	Stadium: Městský stadion Attendance: 2,212; Referee: Tomáš Klíma

8 October 2023 11	Slovan Liberec	2–3	Slavia Prague	Liberec
18:00 CEST (UTC+2)	Kulenović 5'; Preisler 8'; Červ (yellow card) 72'; Fukala (yellow card) 76'; Okoh (yellow card) 90+2'; Varfolomeyev (yellow card) 90+6'	Report	Schranz 16', (yellow card) 78'; van Buren 53' (pen.), (yellow card) 83'; Ogbu (yellow card) 57'; Zafeiris (yellow card) 58', (goal) 87'; Provod (yellow card) 75'	Stadium: Stadion u Nisy; Attendance: 5,927; Referee: Ondřej Pechanec

21 October 2023 12	Slovan Liberec	3–0	Viktoria Plzeň	Liberec
15:00 CEST (UTC+2)	Tupta 17'; Kulenović 67'; Višinský (yellow card) 84'; Červ 86'; Bačkovský (yellow card) 90+2'	Report	Kopic (yellow card) 19'; Kalvach (yellow card) 72'	Stadium: Stadion u Nisy; Attendance: 3,127; Referee: Marek Radina

28 October 2023 13	Slovácko	1–1	Slovan Liberec	Uherské Hradiště
15:00 CEST (UTC+2)	Petržela 10'; Valenta (yellow card) 29'; Juroška (yellow card) 76'	Report	Tupta 16', (yellow card) 53'; Žambůrek (yellow card) 35'; Frýdek (yellow card) 59'; Horský (yellow card) 86'; Pourzitidis (yellow card) 87'	Stadium: Městský fotbalový stadion Miroslava Valenty; Attendance: 4,528; Referee: Ondřej Berka

5 November 2023 14	Slovan Liberec	1–0	České Budějovice	Liberec
15:00 CET (UTC+1)	Pourzitidis (yellow card) 7'; Kulenović 59'; Višinský (yellow card) 71'	Report	Suchan (yellow card) 10'; Nikl (yellow card) 30'	Stadium: Stadion u Nisy; Attendance: 1,827; Referee: Jan Machálek

11 November 2023 15	Hradec Králové	1–1	Slovan Liberec	Hradec Králové
15:00 CET (UTC+1)	Vašulín 27'; Kučera (yellow card) 48'; Čihák (yellow card) 63'; Pilař (yellow card) 73'; Pudhorocký (yellow card) 73'; Sabou (sporting Director) (yellow card) 84'	Report	Frýdek 30'; Fukala (yellow card) 73'; Bačkovský (yellow card) 90+5'	Stadium: Malšovická aréna Attendance: 6,318; Referee: Ladislav Szikszay

25 November 2023 16	Slovan Liberec	2–1	Mladá Boleslav	Liberec
15:00 CET (UTC+1)	Ghali 7', 70'; Prebsl (yellow card) 14'; Mikula (yellow card) 21'	Report	Pulkrab 10'; Sakala (yellow card) 56'; V. Štěpán (custodian) (red card) 90+3'	Stadium: Stadion u Nisy; Attendance: 1,415; Referee: Karel Rouček

9 December 2023 18	Slovan Liberec	5–3	Zlín	Liberec
15:00 CET (UTC+1)	Žambůrek 7'; Frýdek 27' (pen.); Pourzitidis 63'; Červ 78'; Rabušic 90'	Report	Slončík (yellow card) 31'; Tkáč 36'; Janetzký (yellow card) 40'; Cedidla (yellow card) 60'; Černín (yellow card) 62'; Didiba 87', (yellow card) 90+1'; Vukadinović 90+4' (pen.)	Stadium: Stadion u Nisy; Attendance: 1,052; Referee: Vít Zaoral

13 December 2023 17	Bohemians 1905	0–0	Slovan Liberec	Prague
18:00 CET (UTC+1)	Hrubý (yellow card) 53'; Hůlka (yellow card) 68'; Vondra (yellow card) 82'	Report	Ghali (yellow card) 44' (yellow-red card) 58'; P. Čvančara (fitness coach) (yellow card) 58'; Frýdek (yellow card) 70'; Bačkovský (yellow card) 90+3'	Stadium: Ďolíček; Attendance: 2,579; Referee: Stanislav Volek
Note: The match was originally scheduled for 5 December 2023, but was postponed due to snow.

16 December 2023 19	Pardubice	2–0	Slovan Liberec	Pardubice
15:00 CET (UTC+1)	Zlatohlávek 12'; Patrák (yellow card) 37'; Daněk 67', (yellow card) 88'; Kinský (yellow card) 90'; Mukwelle (red card) 90'	Report	Žambůrek (yellow card) 34'; Červ (yellow card) 63'; Mikula (yellow card) 75'; Rabušic (yellow card) 90+3'	Stadium: CFIG Arena; Attendance: 2,189; Referee: Marek Radina

10 February 2024 20	Slovan Liberec	2–0	Sigma Olomouc	Liberec
15:00 CET (UTC+1)	Penner 49'; Horský 80'	Report	Sláma (yellow card) 40'; Pospíšil (yellow card) 45+1'; Juliš (yellow card) 51'; Singhateh (yellow card) 84'	Stadium: Stadion u Nisy; Attendance: 2,427; Referee: Ondřej Berka

18 February 2024 21	Sparta Prague	2–1	Slovan Liberec	Prague
18:00 CET (UTC+1)	Pešek (yellow card) 24'; Haraslín 47'; Olatunji 49'; F. Hrdlička (physician) (yellow card) 75'; Wiesner (yellow card) 84'	Report	Horský 68', (yellow card) 79'	Stadium: epet ARENA; Attendance: 16,829; Referee: Jan Všetečka

24 February 2024 22	Slovan Liberec	3–3	Jablonec	Liberec
15:00 CET (UTC+1)	Mikula (yellow card) 31'; Žambůrek (yellow card) 45+2'; Tupta (yellow card) 48'; Rabušic 72' (pen.); Preisler 85'; Chaluš 90+1'	Report	Chramosta 13' (pen.); Kratochvíl (yellow card) 23'; Hollý (yellow card) 28'; Mikula 58' (o.g.); Chanturishvili 73'; Štěpánek (yellow card) 90+6'	Stadium: Stadion u Nisy; Attendance: 4,427; Referee: Ondřej Pechanec

3 March 2024 23	Teplice	2–0	Slovan Liberec	Teplice
14:00 CET (UTC+1)	Yasser 34'; Fila 41', (yellow card) 75'	Report	Pourzitidis (yellow card) 18'; Ghali (yellow card) 22'; Varfolomeyev (yellow card) 37'; Tupta (yellow card) 45'	Stadium: Na Stínadlech; Attendance: 4,067; Referee: Dominik Starý

9 March 2024 24	Slovan Liberec	1–0	Karviná	Liberec
15:00 CET (UTC+1)	Prebsl (yellow card) 76'; Rabušic 84' (pen.); Vliegen (yellow card) 90+1'	Report	Svozil (yellow card) 30'; Bergqvist (yellow card) 59'; Memić (yellow card) 61'; Fleišman (yellow card) 84'; Vlk (assistant coach) (yellow card) 90+3'	Stadium: Stadion u Nisy; Attendance: 1,831; Referee: Stanislav Volek

17 March 2024 25	Slavia Prague	3–0	Slovan Liberec	Prague
15:00 CET (UTC+1)	Jurečka 15' (pen.), 90+1'; Chytil 83'	Report	Pourzitidis (yellow card) 44'; Chaluš (yellow card) 77'	Stadium: Fortuna Arena; Attendance: 17,513; Referee: Dalibor Černý

30 March 2024 26	Viktoria Plzeň	1–3	Slovan Liberec	Plzeň
15:00 CET (UTC+1)	Hejda (yellow card) 2'; Koubek (coach) (yellow card) 34'; Metsoko 67'; Cadu (yellow card) 72'	Report	Pourzitidis (yellow card) 30'; Ghali (yellow card) 56'; Chaluš 64'; Kulenović 69', 79'; Kozel (coach) (yellow card) 77'; Žambůrek (yellow card) 90+2'	Stadium: Doosan Arena; Attendance: 9,718; Referee: Jan Všetečka

6 April 2024 27	Slovan Liberec	4–1	Slovácko	Liberec
15:00 CEST (UTC+2)	Kulenović 6'; Tupta 23'; Prebsl 56'; Fukala 85'; Varfolomeyev (yellow card) 90+1'	Report	Pourzitidis 53' (o.g.); Kalabiška (yellow card) 59'	Stadium: Stadion u Nisy; Attendance: 3,451; Referee: Jan Petřík

13 April 2024 28	České Budějovice	3–2	Slovan Liberec	České Budějovice
15:00 CEST (UTC+2)	Hellebrand 45', (yellow card) 75'; Ondrášek 67', (yellow card) 71'; Čermák (yellow card) 78'; Suchan 90+6'; Šigut (yellow card) 90+8'	Report	Žambůrek 6', (yellow card) 47'; Mikula (yellow card) 23'; Kulenović (yellow card) 54'; Ghali (yellow card) 87'; Poulolo 90+3' (o.g.)	Stadium: Stadion Střelecký ostrov Attendance: 2,398; Referee: Vít Zaoral

21 April 2024 29	Slovan Liberec	0–0	Hradec Králové	Liberec
15:00 CEST (UTC+2)	Pourzitidis (yellow card) 49'; Bačkovský (yellow card) 55'; Kozel (coach) (yellow card) 56'; Čech (goalkeeper coach) (yellow card) 59'; Prebsl (yellow card) 60'	Report	Vašulín (yellow card) 46'	Stadium: Stadion u Nisy; Attendance: 2,611; Referee: Ondřej Berka

28 April 2024 30	Baník Ostrava	2–2	Slovan Liberec	Ostrava
15:00 CEST (UTC+2)	Ewerton 20' (pen.); Kpozo 46'; Adediran (yellow card) 85'; Tanko (yellow card) 88'	Report	Preisler (yellow card) 34'; Tupta (yellow card) 55'; Prebsl 68'; Tetour (yellow card) 68'; Čech (goalkeeper coach) (yellow card) 88'	Stadium: Městský stadion Attendance: 10,011; Referee: Karel Rouček

==== Play-off ====
===== First round =====
5 May 2024 First leg	Teplice	2–0	Slovan Liberec	Teplice
15:00 CEST (UTC+2)	Gning (yellow card) 26'; Kričfaluši (yellow card) 45+3'; Fila 56'; Havelka 90+2'	Report	Mikula (yellow card) 32'; Doumbia (yellow card) 88'	Stadium: Na Stínadlech; Attendance: 4,954; Referee: Jan Všetečka

12 May 2024 Second leg	Slovan Liberec	1–2 (1–4 agg.)	Teplice	Liberec
15:00 CEST (UTC+2)	Višinský (yellow card) 12'; Prebsl (yellow card) 33'; Tetour (yellow card) 78'; Pourzitidis 81', (yellow card) 81'	Report	Fila (yellow card) 6'; Mićević (yellow card) 28', (goal) 58'; Trubač 49'; Chaloupek (yellow card) 55'	Stadium: Stadion u Nisy; Attendance: 3,266; Referee: Vít Zaoral
Note: Teplice won 4–1 on aggregate.

=== Czech Cup ===
26 September 2023 Third round	Kladno	0–2	Slovan Liberec	Kladno
16:00 CEST (UTC+2)		Report	Horský 80'; Tupta 84'	Stadium: Stadion Františka Kloze; Referee: Tomáš Klíma

1 November 2023 Fourth round	Slovan Liberec	1–0	Mladá Boleslav	Liberec
16:30 CET (UTC+1)	Okoh (yellow card) 87'; Horský 90+1'	Report	Suchomel (yellow card) 82'; Sakala (yellow card) 90'	Stadium: Stadion u Nisy; Referee: Stanislav Volek

28 February 2024 Quarter-finals	Zlín	2–1 (a.e.t.)	Slovan Liberec	Zlín
17:00 CET (UTC+1)	Schánělec 11', (yellow card) 59'; Nombil (yellow card) 55'; Simerský (yellow card) 90' (yellow-red card) 95'; Janetzký 91'; Vukadinović (yellow card) 109'; Pidro (yellow card) 115'	Report	Žambůrek (yellow card) 37'; Doumbia (yellow card) 45'; Pourzitidis 83'; Chaluš (yellow card) 105'	Stadium: Letná Stadion; Referee: Vít Zaoral
