= 2021–22 FC Slovan Liberec season =

Slovan Liberec
2021–22 season
- Chairman: Zbyněk Štiller
- Manager: Pavel Hoftych
- Stadium: Stadion u Nisy
- Czech First League: 6th
- Czech Cup: Second round
Home colours	Away colours	Third colours

The 2021–22 season is the 64th season in the existence of FC Slovan Liberec and the club's 29th consecutive season in the top flight of Czech football. In addition to the domestic league, Slovan Liberec will participate in this season's edition of the Czech Cup.

== Players ==
=== First-team squad ===
As of 28 June 2021

Note: Flags indicate national team as defined under FIFA eligibility rules; some limited exceptions apply. Players may hold more than one non-FIFA nationality.

No.	Pos.	Nation	Player
3	DF	CZE	Jan Mikula
5	MF	CZE	Jan Šulc
6	MF	CZE	Michal Sadílek (on loan from PSV Eindhoven)
7	FW	CZE	Michael Rabušic
11	MF	CZE	Jan Matoušek (on loan from Slavia Prague)
13	DF	CZE	Miroslav Dvořák
16	FW	SVK	Lukáš Csáno
18	DF	SVK	Martin Koscelník
19	FW	BIH	Imad Rondić
20	MF	CZE	Maxmilián Jiří Kytka
22	MF	SVK	Michal Faško
23	DF	CZE	Theodor Gebre Selassie
—	MF	GUI	Kamso Mara

No.	Pos.	Nation	Player
24	DF	CZE	Michal Fukala
26	MF	CZE	Radim Černický
27	FW	SVK	Dominik Gembický
28	MF	CZE	Kristian Michal
29	DF	CIV	Mohamed Tijani (on loan from Slavia Prague)
31	GK	CZE	Lukáš Hasalík
33	DF	GRE	Marios Pourzitidis
34	GK	CZE	Milan Knobloch
37	DF	CZE	Matěj Chaluš
—	DF	UKR	Taras Kacharaba
—	FW	CZE	Ondřej Novotný (on loan from Sparta Prague)
—	MF	SVK	Karol Mészáros
—	DF	NED	Justen Kranthove

== Pre-season and friendlies ==
Win Draw Loss Fixtures

26 June 2021 Friendly	Slovan Liberec (Czech Republic)	5–0	(Czech Republic) Viktoria Žižkov	Mnichovo Hradiště, Czech Republic
11:00 CEST (UTC+2)				Stadium: Fotbalový stadion Mnichovo Hradiště

29 June 2021 Friendly	Slovan Liberec (Czech Republic)	1–3	(Czech Republic) Dukla Prague	Mnichovo Hradiště, Czech Republic
11:00 CEST (UTC+2)				Stadium: Fotbalový stadion Mnichovo Hradiště

30 June 2021 Friendly	Slovan Liberec (Czech Republic)	3–1	(Czech Republic) Ústí nad Labem	Česká Lípa, Czech Republic
11:00 CEST (UTC+2)				Stadium: Městský stadion u Ploučnice

3 July 2021 Friendly	Slovan Liberec (Czech Republic)	3–1	(Czech Republic) Sparta Prague B	Mnichovo Hradiště, Czech Republic
11:00 CEST (UTC+2)				Stadium: Fotbalový stadion Mnichovo Hradiště

9 July 2021 Friendly	Blau-Weiß Linz (Austria)	1–1	(Czech Republic) Slovan Liberec	Linz, Austria
17:00 CEST (UTC+2)	Malicsek 6'		Novotny 65'	Stadium: Hofmann-Personal Stadion

12 July 2021 Friendly	Akhmat Grozny (Russia)	1–2	(Czech Republic) Slovan Liberec	Austria
--:-- CEST (UTC+2)

16 July 2021 Friendly	Jahn Regensburg (Germany)	1–0	(Czech Republic) Slovan Liberec	Passau, Austria
13:00 CEST (UTC+2)				Stadium: Sportanlage Reuthinger Weg

14 January 2022 Friendly	Chindia Târgoviște (Romania)	0–2	(Czech Republic) Slovan Liberec	Belek, Turkey
15:00 TRT (UTC+3)				Stadium: Papillon Sports Centre

24 March 2022 Friendly	Dynamo Dresden (Germany)	2–1	(Czech Republic) Slovan Liberec	Görlitz, Germany
16:00 CET (UTC+1)				Stadium: Stadion der Freundschaft

== Competitions ==
=== Overall record ===
Competition	First match	Last match	Starting round	Final position	Record							
Competition	First match	Last match	Starting round	Final position	Pld	W	D	L	GF	GA	GD	Win %
Czech First League	25 July 2021	May 2022	Matchday 1		25	9	6	10	27	33	−6	36.00
Czech Cup	25 August 2021		Second round	Second round	1	0	0	1	1	2	−1	0.00
Total					26	9	6	11	28	35	−7	34.62

Last updated: 13 March 2022
Source: Soccerway

=== Czech First League ===
==== League table ====
Pos	Team	Pld	W	D	L	GF	GA	GD	Pts	Qualification or relegation
6	Hradec Králové	30	9	13	8	38	40	−2	40	Qualification for the championship group
7	Mladá Boleslav	30	11	5	14	45	48	−3	38	Qualification for the play-off
8	Slovan Liberec	30	10	7	13	29	38	−9	37	Qualification for the play-off
9	Sigma Olomouc	30	9	10	11	39	37	+2	37	Qualification for the play-off
10	České Budějovice	30	9	9	12	40	46	−6	36	Qualification for the play-off

Source: Fortuna Liga
Rules for classification: 1) Points; 2) Head-to-head points; 3) Head-to-head goal difference; 4) Head-to-head goals scored; 5) Goal difference; 6) Goals scored; 7) Fair-play ranking; 8) Draw.

Pos	Team	Pld	W	D	L	GF	GA	GD	Pts	Qualification or relegation	PLZ	SLA	SPA	SLO	OST	HKR
1	Viktoria Plzeň (C)	35	26	7	2	63	21	+42	85	Qualification for the Champions League second qualifying round	—	—	3–0	3–1	1–0	—
2	Slavia Prague	35	24	6	5	80	27	+53	78	Qualification for the Europa Conference League second qualifying round	1–1	—	1–2	3–0	—	—
3	Sparta Prague	35	22	7	6	72	40	+32	73	Qualification for the Europa Conference League second qualifying round	—	—	—	1–2	3–1	1–1
4	Slovácko	35	21	5	9	59	38	+21	68	Qualification to Europa League third qualifying round (Note: Slovácko qualified for the Europa League as Czech Cup winners.)	—	—	—	—	3–1	3–0
5	Baník Ostrava	35	15	10	10	60	48	+12	55		—	1–1	—	—	—	3–1
6	Hradec Králové	35	10	14	11	44	52	−8	44		0–2	4–3	—	—	—	—

Source: Fortuna Liga
Legend: Blue = home team win; Yellow = draw; Red = away team win.
Rules for classification: 1) Total points; 2) Points earned in regular season; 3) Head-to-head points (regular season); 4) Head-to-head goal difference (regular season); 5) Head-to-head goals scored (regular season); 5) Goal difference (all matches); 6) Goals scored (all matches); 7) Fair-play ranking; 8) Draw.
(C) Champions
Notes:

Pos	Team	Pld	W	D	L	GF	GA	GD	Pts	Qualification or relegation	PCE	ZLN	JAB	BOH	TEP	KAR
11	Pardubice	35	9	10	16	42	68	−26	37		—	1–1	—	—	—	2–0
12	Fastav Zlín	35	9	9	17	43	60	−17	36		—	—	1–1	1–4	3–0	—
13	Jablonec	35	6	16	13	27	48	−21	34		0–1	—	—	1–1	—	2–0
14	Bohemians 1905 (O)	35	8	10	17	45	61	−16	34	Qualification for the relegation play-offs	0–1	—	—	—	—	4–0
15	Teplice (O)	35	8	5	22	33	59	−26	29	Qualification for the relegation play-offs	0–2	—	0–1	2–2	—	—
16	Karviná (R)	35	3	10	22	33	63	−30	19	Relegation to the FNL	—	1–1	—	—	2–2	—

Source: Fortuna Liga
Legend: Blue = home team win; Yellow = draw; Red = away team win.
Rules for classification: 1) Total points; 2) Points earned in regular season; 3) Head-to-head points (regular season); 4) Head-to-head goal difference (regular season); 5) Head-to-head goals scored (regular season); 5) Goal difference (all matches); 6) Goals scored (all matches); 7) Fair-play ranking; 8) Draw.
(O) Play-off winners; (R) Relegated

==== Results summary ====
Overall								Home						Away					
Pld	W	D	L	GF	GA	GD	Pts	W	D	L	GF	GA	GD	W	D	L	GF	GA	GD
2	0	0	2	0	6	−6	0	0	0	2	0	6	−6	0	0	0	0	0	0

Last updated: 13 March 2022.
Source: Fortuna Liga

==== Results by round ====
Round	1	2	3	4	5	6	7	8	9	10	11	12	13	14	15	16	17	18	19	20	21	22	23	24	25	26	27	28	29	30
Ground	H	H	A																											
Result	L	L																												
Position	14	16																												

Updated to match(es) played on 13 March 2022. Source: Fortuna Liga
A = Away; H = Home; W = Win; D = Draw; L = Loss

==== Matches ====
25 July 2021 1	Slovan Liberec	0–1	Slovácko	Liberec
16:00 CEST (UTC+2)	Nečas (yellow card) 49'; Koscelník (yellow card) 89'; Gebre Selassie (yellow card) 90+3'	Report	Divíšek (yellow card) 8'; Mareček (yellow card) 21'; Reinberk 31'; Cicilia (red card) 69'; Sadílek (yellow card) 90'	Stadium: Stadion u Nisy; Attendance: 2,499; Referee: Jan Machálek

31 July 2021 2	Slovan Liberec	0–5	Sparta Prague	Liberec
19:00 CEST (UTC+2)	Gebre Selassie (yellow card) 28' (yellow-red card) 52'; Chaluš (yellow card) 65'	Report	Pešek 25'; Hložek 62'; Karabec 65' (pen.); Krejčí 70'; Souček 79'	Stadium: Stadion u Nisy; Attendance: 5,000; Referee: Ondřej Berka

7 August 2021 3	Hradec Králové	1–1	Slovan Liberec	Mladá Boleslav (Note: Hradec Králové played their home matches in Mladá Boleslav due to the rebuilding of their own Všesportovní stadion.)
16:00 CEST (UTC+2)	Král 67'	Report	Rabušic 9'	Stadium: Lokotrans Aréna; Attendance: 960; Referee: Zbyněk Proske

15 August 2021 4	Slovan Liberec	0–1	Viktoria Plzeň	Liberec
19:00 CEST (UTC+2)		Report	Řezník 52'	Stadium: Stadion u Nisy; Attendance: 3,892; Referee: Karel Hrubeš

22 August 2021 5	České Budějovice	1–0	Slovan Liberec	České Budějovice
16:00 CEST (UTC+2)	Sladký 18'	Report		Stadium: Stadion Střelecký ostrov Attendance: 2,679; Referee: Tomáš Batík

28 August 2021 6	Slovan Liberec	0–1	Fastav Zlín	Liberec
16:00 CEST (UTC+2)		Report	Tkáč 82'	Stadium: Stadion u Nisy; Attendance: 2,439; Referee: Dalibor Černý

11 September 2021 7	Pardubice	2–2	Slovan Liberec	Prague (Note: Pardubice continued playing their home matches in Ďolíček due to the rebuilding of their own stadium Pod Vinicí.)
16:00 CEST (UTC+2)	Matějka 57', 73'	Report	Rondić 23'; Mészáros 37'	Stadium: Ďolíček; Attendance: 770; Referee: Miroslav Zelinka

18 September 2021 8	Slovan Liberec	2–1	Mladá Boleslav	Liberec
16:00 CEST (UTC+2)	Helal 82' (pen.); Tupta 86'	Report	Douděra 29'	Stadium: Stadion u Nisy; Attendance: 1,570; Referee: Petr Hocek

26 September 2021 9	Jablonec	0–1	Slovan Liberec	Jablonec nad Nisou
16:00 CEST (UTC+2)		Report	Tupta 37'	Stadium: Stadion Střelnice; Attendance: 3,811; Referee: Karel Hrubeš

3 October 2021 10	Slovan Liberec	0–2	Baník Ostrava	Liberec
16:00 CEST (UTC+2)	Tiéhi (yellow card) 10', (red card) 38'; P. Čvančara (not on pitch) (yellow card) 39'; Matoušek (yellow card) 49'; M. Čech (yellow card) 52'; Chaluš (yellow card) 90+3'	Report	Fleišman 43'; Svozil (yellow card) 45'; Klíma (yellow card) 45+3'; Almási 64', (yellow card) 73' (yellow-red card) 85'; Potočný (yellow card) 70'	Stadium: Stadion u Nisy; Attendance: 3,200; Referee: Jan Machálek

16 October 2021 11	Slavia Prague	3–1	Slovan Liberec	Prague
19:00 CEST (UTC+2)	Bah 43'; Stanciu (yellow card) 49'; Schranz (yellow card) 58'; Kuchta 67'; Olayinka 81'; Ekpai (yellow card) 90+2'	Report	Stoch 73', (yellow card) 86'	Stadium: Sinobo Stadium; Attendance: 12,462; Referee: Pavel Franěk

23 October 2021 12	Slovan Liberec	2–0	Sigma Olomouc	Liberec
16:00 CEST (UTC+2)	Frýdek 15'; Koscelník (yellow card) 51'; Helal 57' (pen.)	Report	Jemelka (yellow card) 36'	Stadium: Stadion u Nisy; Attendance: 2,295; Referee: Tomáš Batík

30 October 2021 13	Teplice	1–2	Slovan Liberec	Teplice
15:00 CEST (UTC+2)	Mazuch 38'	Report	Matoušek 2'; Rondić 90+3'	Stadium: Na Stínadlech; Attendance: 1,523; Referee: Miroslav Zelinka

6 November 2021 14	Slovan Liberec	2–1	Bohemians 1905	Liberec
15:00 CET (UTC+1)	Chaluš 73'; Tupta 90'	Report	Puškáč 78'	Stadium: Stadion u Nisy; Attendance: 2,981; Referee: Marek Radina

21 November 2021 15	Karviná	1–2	Slovan Liberec	Karviná
15:00 CET (UTC+1)	Túlio 17'	Report	Rabušic 38' (pen.); Helal 90+1'	Stadium: Městský stadion Attendance: 2,035; Referee: Pavel Orel

28 November 2021 16	Sparta Prague	2–1	Slovan Liberec	Prague
18:00 CEST (UTC+2)	Karabec 5'; Pulkrab 81'	Report	Frýdek 33'	Stadium: Generali Arena; Attendance: 977; Referee: Ondrej Pechanec

4 December 2021 17	Slovan Liberec	1–0	Hradec Králové	Liberec
15:00 CET (UTC+1)	Tupta 38'	Report		Stadium: Stadion u Nisy; Attendance: 1,000; Referee: Tomáš Klíma

11 December 2021 18	Viktoria Plzeň	2–0	Slovan Liberec	Plzeň
18:00 CET (UTC+1)	Řezník 17'; Sýkora 28'	Report		Stadium: Doosan Arena; Attendance: 1,000; Referee: Dalibor Černý

19 December 2021 19	Slovan Liberec	0–0	České Budějovice	Liberec
15:00 CET (UTC+1)		Report		Stadium: Stadion u Nisy; Attendance: 1,000; Referee: Pavel Franěk

15 February 2022 20	Fastav Zlín	2–0	Slovan Liberec	Zlín
16:30 CET (UTC+1)	Tkáč 65'; Hrubý 78'	Report		Stadium: Letná Stadion; Attendance: 1,000; Referee: Miroslav Zelinka

20 February 2022 22	Mladá Boleslav	3–3	Slovan Liberec	Mladá Boleslav
15:00 CET (UTC+1)	Ewerton 9', 90+2'; Hlavatý 69'	Report	Matoušek 24', 53'; Rondić 29'	Stadium: Lokotrans Aréna; Attendance: 1,674; Referee: Josef Krejsa

26 February 2022 23	Slovan Liberec	1–1	Jablonec	Liberec
15:00 CET (UTC+1)	Rabušic 54' (pen.)	Report	Černák 77'	Stadium: Stadion u Nisy; Attendance: 3,489; Referee: Ondřej Berka

5 March 2022 24	Baník Ostrava	1–1	Slovan Liberec	Ostrava
18:00 CET (UTC+1)	Almási 19'	Report	Mikula 79'	Stadium: Městský stadion Attendance: 6,249; Referee: Marek Radina

9 March 2022 21	Slovan Liberec	4–1	Pardubice	Liberec
16:30 CET (UTC+1)	Mikula 11'; Rabušic 26' (pen.), 30'; Rondić 76'	Report	Huf 15'	Stadium: Stadion u Nisy; Attendance: 1,550; Referee: Michal Křepský
Note: The match was originally scheduled for 12 February 2022, but was postponed due to the isolation and quarantine measures imposed on the Pardubice team.

13 March 2022 25	Slovan Liberec	1–0	Slavia Prague	Liberec
15:00 CET (UTC+1)	Olayinka 14' (o.g.); Štetina (red card) 20'; Mikula (yellow card) 45'; Frýdek (yellow card) 52'; Višinský (yellow card) 76'	Report	Olayinka (yellow card) 59'; Schranz (yellow card) 64'; Plavšić (yellow card) 75'; Bah (yellow card) 84'	Stadium: Stadion u Nisy; Attendance: 6,123; Referee: Petr Hocek

20 March 2022 26	Sigma Olomouc	1–0	Slovan Liberec	Olomouc
15:00 CEST (UTC+2)	Navrátil 25'; Růsek (yellow card) 75'; Macík (yellow card) 90+3'; Beneš (yellow card) 90+4'; Daněk (yellow card) 90+5'; Jílek (not on pitch) (yellow card) 90+6'	Report	Pourzitidis (yellow card) 59'	Stadium: Andrův stadion Attendance: 3,111; Referee: Pavel Orel

2 April 2022 27	Slovan Liberec	0–1	Teplice	Liberec
16:00 CEST (UTC+2)		Report	Sejk 67'	Stadium: Stadion u Nisy; Attendance: 1,558; Referee: Zbyněk Proske

9 April 2022 28	Bohemians 1905	0–0	Slovan Liberec	Prague
16:00 CEST (UTC+2)		Report		Stadium: Ďolíček; Attendance: 3,812; Referee: Ondřej Berka

17 April 2022 29	Slovan Liberec	2–1	Karviná	Liberec
17:00 CEST (UTC+2)	Rabušic 31' (pen.); Koscelník 60'	Report	N'Diaye 12'	Stadium: Stadion u Nisy; Attendance: 1,521; Referee: Jan Petřík

20 April 2022 30	Slovácko	2–0	Slovan Liberec	Uherské Hradiště
18:00 CEST (UTC+2)	Jurečka 40' (pen.), 62' (pen.)	Report		Stadium: Městský fotbalový stadion Miroslava Valenty; Attendance: 3,068; Referee: Michal Křepský
