= List of Czech football transfers summer 2025 =

This is a list of Czech football transfers for the 2025 summer transfer window. Only transfers featuring Chance Liga are listed.

== Chance Liga ==
Note: Flags indicate national team as has been defined under FIFA eligibility rules. Players may hold more than one non-FIFA nationality.

=== Slavia Prague ===
In:

No.	Pos.	Nation	Player
8	DF	JPN	Daiki Hashioka (from (England) Luton Town)
11	FW	GAM	Youssoupha Sanyang (from (Sweden) Öster)
12	DF	SEN	Youssoupha Mbodji (from Vysočina Jihlava)
23	MF	CZE	Michal Sadílek (from (Netherlands) Twente)
37	DF	SVK	Dominik Javorček (from (Slovakia) Žilina, previously on loan at (Germany) Holstein Kiel)
—	DF	CZE	Ondřej Kričfaluši (from Teplice)

Out:

No.	Pos.	Nation	Player
6	MF	KEN	Timothy Ouma (on loan to (Poland) Lech Poznań)
12	DF	SEN	El Hadji Malick Diouf (to (England) West Ham United)
14	MF	CMR	Simion Michez (on loan to Sigma Olomouc)
46	DF	CZE	Mikuláš Konečný (on loan to Pardubice)
48	MF	CZE	Dominik Pech (on loan to (Switzerland) Young Boys)
—	DF	CZE	Albert Labík (on loan to Karviná, previously on loan at Teplice)
—	DF	ROU	Andres Dumitrescu (on loan to Sigma Olomouc, previously on loan at (Romania) Sepsi OSK)
—	MF	CZE	Filip Prebsl (on loan to Mladá Boleslav, previously on loan at (Poland) Górnik Zabrze)
—	FW	NGA	Muhamed Tijani (on loan to Sigma Olomouc, previously on loan at (England) Plymouth Argyle)
—	DF	SVK	Michal Tomič (to (Slovakia) Spartak Trnava, previously on loan at Karviná)
—	MF	CZE	Lukáš Masopust (from Slovan Liberec, previously on loan)

=== Viktoria Plzeň ===
In:

No.	Pos.	Nation	Player
9	MF	CZE	Denis Višinský (from Slovan Liberec)
18	MF	CZE	Tomáš Ladra (from Mladá Boleslav)
85	MF	SVN	Adrian Zeljković (from (Slovakia) Spartak Trnava)

Out:

No.	Pos.	Nation	Player
12	MF	CZE	Alexandr Sojka (to Hradec Králové)
22	MF	BRA	Cadu (to (Hungary) Ferencváros)
23	MF	CZE	Lukáš Kalvach (to Qatar SC)
30	GK	CZE	Viktor Baier (on loan to (Austria) Blau-Weiß Linz)
31	MF	CZE	Pavel Šulc (to (France) Lyon)
51	FW	CZE	Daniel Vašulín (on loan to Sigma Olomouc)
—	DF	CZE	Václav Míka (on loan to (Slovakia) Tatran Prešov, previously on loan at České Budějovice)
—	MF	CZE	Tom Slončík (reloan to Hradec Králové)
—	FW	BRA	Ricardinho (on loan to (Kazakhstan) Kairat, previously on loan at (Israel) Maccabi Haifa)
—	FW	FRA	Idjessi Metsoko (on loan to (Slovakia) Spartak Trnava, previously on loan at (Slovakia) Slovan Bratislava)
—	MF	CZE	Roman Květ (to (Belgium) Dender, previously on loan)

=== Baník Ostrava ===
In:

No.	Pos.	Nation	Player
1	GK	SVK	Viktor Budinský (from Pardubice, previously on loan at (Slovakia) Zemplín Michalovce)
4	MF	CIV	Christ Tiéhi (on loan from (Hungary) Diósgyőr)
8	MF	CZE	Christian Frýdek (from Slovan Liberec)
20	MF	SRB	Srđan Plavšić (on loan from (Poland) Raków Częstochowa)

Out:

No.	Pos.	Nation	Player
6	DF	CZE	Michal Fukala (to Zlín)
7	MF	BRA	Ewerton (to (Egypt) Pyramids)
13	MF	CZE	Samuel Grygar (on loan to (Slovakia) Ružomberok)
24	DF	CZE	Jan Juroška (to Zbrojovka Brno)
35	GK	CZE	Jakub Trefil (loan return to Sigma Olomouc)
—	FW	CZE	Jiří Klíma (to Mladá Boleslav, previously on loan at Slovácko)

=== Sparta Prague ===
In:

No.	Pos.	Nation	Player
3	DF	CZE	Pavel Kadeřábek (from (Germany) TSG Hoffenheim)
5	MF	EQG	Santiago Eneme (from Slovan Liberec)
7	MF	ECU	John Mercado (from (Portugal) AVS)
10	FW	CZE	Jan Kuchta (from (Denmark) Midtjylland, previously on loan)
20	MF	NOR	Sivert Mannsverk (on loan from (Netherlands) Ajax, previously on loan at (Wales) Cardiff City)
21	MF	SVK	Dominik Hollý (from Jablonec)
28	FW	CMR	Kevin-Prince Milla (from Dukla Prague)
—	DF	CZE	Petr Hodouš (from České Budějovice)

Out:

No.	Pos.	Nation	Player
3	DF	ESP	Imanol García de Albéniz (on loan to Andorra)
5	DF	DEN	Mathias Ross (loan return to (Turkey) Galatasaray)
7	FW	NGA	Victor Olatunji (to (United States) Real Salt Lake)
11	FW	ALB	Indrit Tuci (on loan to (Turkey) Kayserispor)
20	MF	ALB	Qazim Laçi (to (Turkey) Çaykur Rizespor)
28	DF	CZE	Tomáš Wiesner (to (United States) Houston Dynamo 2)
41	DF	CZE	Martin Vitík (to (Italy) Bologna)
46	GK	NED	Joeri Heerkens (to (Netherlands) Ajax)
—	DF	CZE	Ondrej Kukučka (on loan to Bohemians, previously on loan at Slovácko)
—	MF	CZE	Adam Karabec (on loan to (France) Lyon, previously on loan at (Germany) Hamburger SV)
—	FW	CZE	Václav Sejk (on loan to (Netherlands) Heerenveen, previously on loan at (Portugal) Famalicão)
—	DF	CZE	Petr Hodouš (to Slovan Liberec)
—	MF	CZE	Matěj Polidar (to Jablonec, previously on loan)
—	MF	CZE	Filip Souček (to (Slovakia) Tatran Prešov, previously on loan at (Slovakia) Ružomberok)

=== Jablonec ===
In:

No.	Pos.	Nation	Player
9	MF	CZE	Lukáš Penxa (on loan from Sparta Prague B)
17	MF	SVK	Samuel Lavrinčík (from (Slovakia) Ružomberok)
21	MF	CZE	Matěj Polidar (from Sparta Prague, previously on loan)
44	FW	GAM	Lamin Jawo (from Mladá Boleslav, previously on loan)
90	DF	BFA	Nassim Innocenti (from (Slovakia) Košice)

Out:

No.	Pos.	Nation	Player
20	FW	BDI	Bienvenue Kanakimana (to Zbrojovka Brno)
26	MF	SVK	Dominik Hollý (to Sparta Prague)
37	FW	CZE	Matouš Krulich (to Mladá Boleslav)
95	MF	CZE	Michal Černák (to Dukla Prague)
—	GK	CZE	Vilém Fendrich (to Česká Lípa, previously on loan at České Budějovice)

=== Sigma Olomouc ===
In:

No.	Pos.	Nation	Player
5	DF	SVK	Tomáš Huk (from (Poland) Piast Gliwice)
10	MF	MKD	Tihomir Kostadinov (from (Poland) Piast Gliwice)
15	FW	CZE	Daniel Vašulín (on loan from Viktoria Plzeň)
23	DF	ROU	Andres Dumitrescu (on loan from Slavia Prague, previously on loan at (Romania) Sepsi OSK)
24	MF	CZE	David Tkáč (from Zlín)
26	FW	NGA	Muhamed Tijani (on loan from Slavia Prague, previously on loan at (England) Plymouth Argyle)
33	DF	SVK	Matúš Malý (from (Slovakia) Ružomberok)
39	MF	CZE	Dominik Janošek (from (Netherlands) NAC Breda)
75	MF	CMR	Simion Michez (on loan from Slavia Prague)
98	GK	SVK	Matúš Hruška (from Dukla Prague)

Out:

No.	Pos.	Nation	Player
10	MF	CZE	Filip Zorvan (free agent)
32	MF	EST	Vladislav Kreida (to (Estonia) Flora)
38	DF	CZE	Jakub Pokorný (to (Greece) Kifisia)
39	FW	CZE	Lukáš Juliš (to (Slovakia) Žilina)
49	MF	CZE	Jan Sýkora (retired)
77	MF	CZE	Jan Vodháněl (free agent)

=== Slovan Liberec ===
In:

No.	Pos.	Nation	Player
1	GK	SVK	Ivan Krajčírik (from (Poland) Widzew Łódź, previously on loan)
5	DF	CZE	Petr Hodouš (from Sparta Prague)
7	MF	NGA	Soliu Afolabi (from Silon Táborsko)
9	FW	CZE	Lukáš Mašek (from Mladá Boleslav)
11	FW	CZE	Filip Špatenka (from Dukla Prague)
12	MF	CZE	Vojtěch Stránský (from Mladá Boleslav)
16	DF	FRA	Ange N'Guessan (on loan from (Italy) Torino, previously on loan at (Slovenia) Bravo)
17	FW	CZE	Petr Juliš (from Hradec Králové)
20	MF	AUT	Ermin Mahmić (from (Austria) SV Lafnitz)
26	MF	CZE	Lukáš Masopust (from Slavia Prague, previously on loan)
—	MF	CZE	Hynek Hruška (from Sparta Prague B)

Out:

No.	Pos.	Nation	Player
5	MF	CZE	Denis Višinský (to Viktoria Plzeň)
6	MF	UKR	Ivan Varfolomeyev (to (England) Lincoln City)
7	FW	CZE	Michael Rabušic (retired)
9	MF	EQG	Santiago Eneme (to Sparta Prague)
11	MF	CZE	Christian Frýdek (to Baník Ostrava)
28	FW	GHA	Benjamin Nyarko (on loan to Teplice)
29	DF	CZE	Dominik Mašek (on loan to Pardubice)
—	MF	CZE	Hynek Hruška (on loan to Vlašim)
—	MF	CZE	Milan Lexa (on loan to Pardubice, previously on loan at Varnsdorf)
—	DF	GRE	Marios Pourzitidis (to Dukla Prague, previously on loan)
—	MF	CZE	Tomáš Polyák (to Silon Táborsko, previously on loan)
—	FW	NED	Olaf Kok (to (Netherlands) Spakenburg, previously on loan at Vyškov)
—	FW	SVK	Ľubomír Tupta (to (Greece) AEL, previously on loan at (Poland) Widzew Łódź)

=== Karviná ===
In:

No.	Pos.	Nation	Player
9	DF	CZE	Albert Labík (on loan from Slavia Prague, previously on loan at Teplice)
12	FW	SEN	Abdallah Gning (from Teplice)
24	DF	CZE	Jan Chytrý (from Vysočina Jihlava)
31	MF	GUI	Ousmane Condé (from (Spain) Leganés B, previously on loan at Vyškov)

Out:

No.	Pos.	Nation	Player
11	DF	MNE	Andrija Ražnatović (to (Montenegro) Sutjeska Nikšić)
15	DF	CZE	Lukáš Endl (on loan to (Slovakia) Ružomberok)
18	FW	BRA	Kahuan Vinícius (on loan to (Portugal) Torreense U23)
20	DF	MNE	Momčilo Raspopović (to (Montenegro) Budućnost Podgorica)
28	MF	CZE	Patrik Čavoš (to Zbrojovka Brno)
29	DF	SVK	Michal Tomič (loan return to Slavia Prague)
—	FW	SVK	Matej Franko (on loan to (Slovakia) Tatran Liptovský Mikuláš, previously on loan at (Slovakia) Tatran Prešov)
—	MF	SVK	Rajmund Mikuš (to Dukla Prague, previously on loan)

=== Hradec Králové ===
In:

No.	Pos.	Nation	Player
2	DF	CZE	David Ludvíček (from Dukla Prague)
7	DF	SVK	Jakub Uhrinčať (from Sparta Prague B)
8	MF	CZE	Alexandr Sojka (from Viktoria Plzeň)
10	FW	NED	Mick van Buren (from (Poland) Cracovia)
14	FW	CZE	Jakub Hodek (from Dukla Prague)
16	MF	CZE	Vladimír Darida (from (Greece) Aris Thessaloniki)
19	MF	CZE	Tom Slončík (reloan from Viktoria Plzeň)
38	FW	SVK	Adam Griger (from (Spain) Granada B, previously on loan)
77	DF	CZE	Lucas Kubr (from Zbrojovka Brno)

Out:

No.	Pos.	Nation	Player
13	DF	CZE	Karel Spáčil (loan return to Viktoria Plzeň)
14	DF	CZE	Jakub Klíma (to Zbrojovka Brno)
17	FW	CZE	Petr Juliš (to Slovan Liberec)
18	MF	CZE	Daniel Samek (loan return to (Italy) Lecce)
27	FW	CZE	Ondřej Šašinka (to (Slovakia) Ružomberok)
—	FW	CZE	Daniel Hais (on loan to Prostějov, previously on loan at Silon Táborsko)
—	FW	CZE	Filip Firbacher (on loan to České Budějovice, previously on loan at Varnsdorf)
—	FW	CZE	Matěj Náprstek (to Teplice, previously on loan at Chrudim)

=== Bohemians ===
In:

No.	Pos.	Nation	Player
6	MF	ZAM	Benson Sakala (from Mladá Boleslav)
35	DF	CZE	Ondrej Kukučka (on loan from Sparta Prague, previously on loan at Slovácko)
99	DF	EST	Vlasiy Sinyavskiy (from Slovácko)

Out:

No.	Pos.	Nation	Player
2	DF	CZE	Jan Shejbal (to Chrudim)
4	MF	CZE	Josef Jindřišek (to Velké Hamry)
11	MF	CZE	Vojtěch Novák (to (Slovakia) Ružomberok)
31	MF	CZE	Ondřej Petrák (to Zápy)
34	DF	CZE	Antonín Křapka (to Zlín)

=== Teplice ===
In:

No.	Pos.	Nation	Player
5	DF	SVK	Jakub Jakubko (from (Slovakia) Košice)
10	FW	CZE	Matěj Pulkrab (from Mladá Boleslav)
11	FW	CZE	Matyáš Kozák (from Sparta Prague B, previously on loan at Slovácko)
12	FW	CZE	Matěj Náprstek (from Hradec Králové, previously on loan at Chrudim)
18	FW	BIH	Hamza Ljukovac (on loan from (Turkey) İstanbul Başakşehir, previously on loan at (Bosnia and Herzegovina) Sloga Meridian)
25	MF	SVK	Matej Riznič (on loan from (Slovakia) Petržalka)
27	FW	GHA	Benjamin Nyarko (on loan from Slovan Liberec)
29	GK	CZE	Matouš Trmal (from Mladá Boleslav, previously on loan)
31	GK	CZE	Kryštof Lichtenberg (on loan from Mladá Boleslav B, previously on loan at Zbrojovka Brno)

Out:

No.	Pos.	Nation	Player
2	DF	CZE	Albert Labík (loan return to Slavia Prague)
25	FW	SEN	Abdallah Gning (to Karviná)
27	DF	CZE	Ondřej Kričfaluši (to Slavia Prague)

=== Mladá Boleslav ===
In:

No.	Pos.	Nation	Player
23	FW	CZE	Jiří Klíma (from Baník Ostrava, previously on loan at Slovácko)
37	FW	CZE	Matouš Krulich (from Jablonec)
38	MF	CZE	Filip Prebsl (on loan from Slavia Prague, previously on loan at (Poland) Górnik Zabrze)

Out:

No.	Pos.	Nation	Player
5	MF	ZAM	Benson Sakala (to Bohemians)
10	MF	CZE	Tomáš Ladra (to Viktoria Plzeň)
12	MF	CZE	Vojtěch Stránský (to Slovan Liberec)
18	FW	CZE	Matěj Pulkrab (to Teplice)
28	FW	CZE	Lukáš Mašek (to Slovan Liberec)
—	GK	CZE	Matouš Trmal (to Teplice, previously on loan)
—	FW	GAM	Lamin Jawo (to Jablonec, previously on loan)

=== Slovácko ===
In:

No.	Pos.	Nation	Player

Out:

No.	Pos.	Nation	Player
9	FW	CZE	Jiří Klíma (loan return to Baník Ostrava)
17	FW	CZE	Matyáš Kozák (loan return to Sparta Prague B)
35	DF	CZE	Ondrej Kukučka (loan return to Sparta Prague)
99	DF	EST	Vlasiy Sinyavskiy (to Bohemians)

=== Dukla Prague ===
In:

No.	Pos.	Nation	Player
10	MF	SVK	Rajmund Mikuš (from MFK Karviná, previously on loan)
37	DF	GRE	Marios Pourzitidis (from Slovan Liberec, previously on loan)
95	MF	CZE	Michal Černák (from Jablonec)

Out:

No.	Pos.	Nation	Player
2	DF	CZE	David Ludvíček (to Hradec Králové)
11	FW	CMR	Kevin-Prince Milla (to Sparta Prague)
14	FW	CZE	Jakub Hodek (to Hradec Králové)
21	FW	CZE	Filip Špatenka (to Slovan Liberec)
28	GK	SVK	Matúš Hruška (to Sigma Olomouc)

=== Pardubice ===
In:

No.	Pos.	Nation	Player
19	DF	CZE	Dominik Mašek (on loan from Slovan Liberec)
31	MF	CZE	Milan Lexa (on loan from Slovan Liberec, previously on loan at Varnsdorf)
32	DF	CZE	Mikuláš Konečný (on loan from Slavia Prague)

Out:

No.	Pos.	Nation	Player
—	GK	SVK	Viktor Budinský (to Baník Ostrava, previously on loan at (Slovakia) Zemplín Michalovce)

=== Zlín ===
In:

No.	Pos.	Nation	Player
22	DF	CZE	Michal Fukala (from Baník Ostrava)
39	DF	CZE	Antonín Křapka (from Bohemians)

Out:

No.	Pos.	Nation	Player
12	MF	CZE	David Tkáč (to Sigma Olomouc)

== See also ==
- 2025–26 Czech First League
