= 2022–23 FC Slovan Liberec season =

FC Slovan Liberec
2022–23 season
- Chairman: Zbyněk Štiller
- Manager: Luboš Kozel
- Stadium: Stadion u Nisy
- Czech First League: 8th
- Czech Cup: Quarter-finals

The 2022–23 season is the 65th in the history of FC Slovan Liberec and their 30th consecutive season in the top flight. The club will participate in the Czech First League and the Czech Cup.

== Players ==
As of 12 December 2022

Note: Flags indicate national team as defined under FIFA eligibility rules; some limited exceptions apply. Players may hold more than one non-FIFA nationality.

No.	Pos.	Nation	Player
1	GK	BEL	Olivier Vliegen
2	DF	CZE	Dominik Plechatý (on loan from Sparta Prague)
3	DF	CZE	Jan Mikula
5	MF	CZE	Denis Višinský
6	MF	UKR	Ivan Varfolomeyev
7	FW	CZE	Michael Rabušic
8	MF	CZE	Lukáš Červ
9	FW	CZE	Matyáš Kozák (on loan from Sparta Prague)
10	MF	SVK	Karol Mészáros
11	MF	CZE	Christián Frýdek
14	FW	NED	Mick van Buren (on loan from Slavia Prague)
15	MF	CIV	Mohamed Doumbia

No.	Pos.	Nation	Player
19	FW	BIH	Imad Rondić
20	DF	CZE	Dominik Preisler
23	DF	CZE	Theodor Gebre Selassie
24	DF	CZE	Michal Fukala
25	MF	NGR	Ahmad Ghali
27	MF	CZE	Matěj Valenta (on loan from Slavia Prague)
29	MF	GUI	Kamso Mara
30	DF	CZE	Filip Prebsl (on loan from Slavia Prague)
31	GK	CZE	Jan Stejskal
32	GK	CZE	Lukáš Pešl
33	DF	GRE	Marios Pourzitidis

=== Out on loan ===
Note: Flags indicate national team as defined under FIFA eligibility rules; some limited exceptions apply. Players may hold more than one non-FIFA nationality.

No.	Pos.	Nation	Player
—	MF	CIV	Christ Tiéhi (at Slavia Prague)
—	DF	CZE	Ondřej Lehoczki (at Vlašim)
—	MF	CZE	Kristian Michal (at Varnsdorf)

No.	Pos.	Nation	Player
—	GK	CZE	Lukáš Hasalík (at Fotbal Třinec)
—	MF	CZE	Dominik Gembický (at Fotbal Třinec)

== Pre-season and friendlies ==
Win Draw Loss Fixtures

== Competitions ==
=== Overall record ===
Competition	First match	Last match	Starting round	Final position	Record							
Competition	First match	Last match	Starting round	Final position	Pld	W	D	L	GF	GA	GD	Win %
Czech First League	31 July 2022	30 April 2023	Matchday 1	7th	30	10	8	12	39	43	−4	33.33
Czech First League play-off	7 May 2023	26 May 2023	First round	Winners	4	2	0	2	12	6	+6	50.00
Czech Cup	14 September 2022	1 March 2023	Second round	Quarter-finals	4	3	1	0	17	4	+13	75.00
Total					38	15	9	14	68	53	+15	39.47

Source: Soccerway

=== Czech First League ===
==== Results summary ====
Overall								Home						Away					
Pld	W	D	L	GF	GA	GD	Pts	W	D	L	GF	GA	GD	W	D	L	GF	GA	GD
30	10	8	12	39	43	−4	38	5	5	5	23	20	+3	5	3	7	16	23	−7

Source: Fortuna Liga

==== Regular season ====
===== League table =====
Pos	Team	Pld	W	D	L	GF	GA	GD	Pts	Qualification or relegation
5	Slovácko	30	13	7	10	36	38	−2	46	Qualification for the championship group
6	Sigma Olomouc	30	10	11	9	45	40	+5	41	Qualification for the championship group
7	Slovan Liberec	30	10	8	12	39	43	−4	38	Qualification for the play-off
8	Hradec Králové	30	11	5	14	34	40	−6	38	Qualification for the play-off
9	Mladá Boleslav	30	9	10	11	39	42	−3	37	Qualification for the play-off

Source: Fortuna Liga
Rules for classification: 1) Points; 2) Head-to-head points; 3) Head-to-head goal difference; 4) Head-to-head goals scored; 5) Goal difference; 6) Goals scored; 7) Fair-play ranking; 8) Draw.

===== Results by round =====
Round	1	2	3	4	5	6	7	8	9	10	11	12	13	14	15	16	17	18	19	20	21	22	23	24	25	26	27	28	29	30
Ground	A	H	A	H	A	A	H	A	H	A	H	A	H	A	H	A	H	A	H	H	A	H	A	H	A	H	A	H	A	H
Result	W	W	L	D	W	D	L	W	L	L	D	L	W	L	W	L	D	W	L	D	L	L	L	D	D	W	D	W	W	L
Position	4	1	4	5	3	4	5	3	4	5	6	7	7	8	7	9	9	8	8	8	9	9	11	11	10	10	11	9	7	7
Points	3	6	6	7	10	11	11	14	14	14	15	15	18	18	21	21	22	25	25	26	26	26	26	27	28	31	32	35	38	38

Source: Fortuna Liga
A = Away; H = Home; W = Win; D = Draw; L = Loss

===== Matches =====
The league fixtures were announced on 22 June 2022.

31 July 2022	Sparta Prague	1–2	Slovan Liberec	Prague
CEST (UTC+2)				Stadium: Stadion Letná

6 August 2022	Slovan Liberec	5–1	Teplice	Liberec
CEST (UTC+2)				Stadium: Stadion u Nisy

14 August 2022	Pardubice	2–1	Slovan Liberec	Pardubice
CEST (UTC+2)				Stadium: CFIG Arena

21 August 2022	Slovan Liberec	1–1	České Budějovice	Liberec
CEST (UTC+2)				Stadium: Stadion u Nisy

28 August 2022	Slovácko	1–2	Slovan Liberec	Uherské Hradiště
CEST (UTC+2)				Stadium: Městský fotbalový stadion Miroslava Valenty

31 August 2022	Sigma Olomouc	1–1	Slovan Liberec	Olomouc
CEST (UTC+2)				Stadium: Andrův stadion

3 September 2022	Slovan Liberec	0–1	Viktoria Plzeň	Liberec
CEST (UTC+2)				Stadium: Stadion u Nisy

11 September 2022	Bohemians 1905	0–2	Slovan Liberec	Vršovice
CEST (UTC+2)				Stadium: Ďolíček

17 September 2022	Slovan Liberec	1–3	Mladá Boleslav	Liberec
CEST (UTC+2)				Stadium: Stadion u Nisy

2 October 2022	Slavia Prague	3–0	Slovan Liberec	Prague
CEST (UTC+2)				Stadium: Fortuna Arena

9 October 2022	Slovan Liberec	0–0	Baník Ostrava	Liberec
CEST (UTC+2)				Stadium: Stadion u Nisy

16 October 2022	Trinity Zlín	2–1	Slovan Liberec	Zlín
CEST (UTC+2)				Stadium: Letná Stadion

22 October 2022	Slovan Liberec	2–0	Jablonec	Liberec
CEST (UTC+2)				Stadium: Stadion u Nisy

30 October 2022	Zbrojovka Brno	3–0	Slovan Liberec	Brno
CET (UTC+1)				Stadium: Městský fotbalový stadion Srbská

6 November 2022	Slovan Liberec	2–0	Hradec Králové	Liberec
CET (UTC+1)				Stadium: Stadion u Nisy

12 November 2022	Teplice	2–1	Slovan Liberec	Teplice
CET (UTC+1)				Stadium: Na Stínadlech

29 January 2023	Slovan Liberec	1–1	Pardubice	Liberec
CET (UTC+1)				Stadium: Stadion u Nisy

5 February 2023	České Budějovice	0–2	Slovan Liberec	České Budějovice
CET (UTC+1)				Stadium: Stadion Střelecký ostrov

11 February 2023	Slovan Liberec	0–1	Slovácko	Liberec
CET (UTC+1)				Stadium: Stadion u Nisy

18 February 2023	Slovan Liberec	2–2	Sigma Olomouc	Liberec
CET (UTC+1)				Stadium: Stadion u Nisy

25 February 2023	Viktoria Plzeň	2–1	Slovan Liberec	Plzeň
CET (UTC+1)				Stadium: Doosan Arena

5 March 2023	Slovan Liberec	1–3	Bohemians 1905	Liberec
CET (UTC+1)				Stadium: Stadion u Nisy

12 March 2023	Mladá Boleslav	4–0	Slovan Liberec	Mladá Boleslav
CET (UTC+1)				Stadium: Lokotrans Aréna

18 March 2023	Slovan Liberec	2–2	Slavia Prague	Liberec
CET (UTC+1)				Stadium: Stadion u Nisy

1 April 2023	Baník Ostrava	0–0	Slovan Liberec	Ostrava
CEST (UTC+2)				Stadium: Městský stadion

8 April 2023	Slovan Liberec	2–1	Trinity Zlín	Liberec
CEST (UTC+2)				Stadium: Stadion u Nisy

15 April 2023	Jablonec	1–1	Slovan Liberec	Jablonec nad Nisou
CEST (UTC+2)				Stadium: Stadion Střelnice

23 April 2023	Slovan Liberec	3–1	Zbrojovka Brno	Liberec
CEST (UTC+2)				Stadium: Stadion u Nisy

26 April 2023	Hradec Králové	1–2	Slovan Liberec	Hradec Králové
CEST (UTC+2)				Stadium: Malšovická aréna

30 April 2023	Slovan Liberec	1–3	Sparta Prague	Liberec
CEST (UTC+2)				Stadium: Stadion u Nisy

==== Play-off ====
===== First round =====
7 May 2023 First leg	České Budějovice	3–2	Slovan Liberec	České Budějovice
15:00 CEST (UTC+2)	Čermák (yellow card) 16' (yellow-red card) 90+4'; Hellebrand 25'; Adediran 41'; Králik 50'	Report	Olatunji 7'; Tupta 10'; Červ (yellow card) 79' (yellow-red card) 84'	Stadium: Stadion Střelecký ostrov Attendance: 3,246; Referee: Josef Krejsa

13 May 2023 Second leg	Slovan Liberec	4–0 (6–3 agg.)	České Budějovice	Liberec
15:00 CEST (UTC+2)	Kozák 38'; Varfolomeyev (yellow card) 45+2'; Frýdek 66'; Tupta 81'; Olatunji 89'	Report	Adediran (yellow card) 29'; Havel (yellow card) 78'; Čoudek (yellow card) 88'	Stadium: Stadion u Nisy; Attendance: 1,358; Referee: Tomáš Ulrich
Note: Slovan Liberec won 6–3 on aggregate.

===== Second round =====
21 May 2023 First leg	Hradec Králové	0–4	Slovan Liberec	Liberec
15:00 CEST (UTC+2)	Kubala (yellow card) 24'; Kučera (yellow card) 45+1'; Čech (yellow card) 52'; Leibl (yellow card) 75'	Report	Olatunji 21', 45+2'; Frýdek 29'; Pourzitidis 88'	Stadium: Stadion u Nisy; Attendance: 950; Referee: Stanislav Volek

26 May 2023 Second leg	Slovan Liberec	2–3 (6–3 agg.)	Hradec Králové	Liberec
18:00 CEST (UTC+2)	Doumbia 22'; Polyák (yellow card) 43'; Tupta 57'	Report	Trusa 52', 81'; Čech (yellow card) 60'; Ryneš (yellow card) 75'; Kubala 78'; Rada (yellow card) 84'	Stadium: Stadion u Nisy; Attendance: 1,758; Referee: Filip Kotala
Note: Slovan Liberec won 6–3 on aggregate.
