= 2024–25 FC Slovan Liberec season =

Slovan Liberec
2024–25 season
- Manager: Radoslav Kováč
- Stadium: Stadion u Nisy
- Czech First League: 1st
- Czech Cup: Pre-season
- Top goalscorer: League: Dominik Plechatý; Adam Ševínský; Denis Višinský (1 each); All: Dominik Plechatý; Adam Ševínský; Denis Višinský (1 each)
- Average home league attendance: 3,430
Home colours	Away colours

The 2024–25 season is the 67th season in the history of FC Slovan Liberec, and the club's 32nd consecutive season in Czech First League. In addition to the domestic league, the team is scheduled to participate in the Czech Cup.

Luboš Kozel managed the team until the end of the previous season, replaced by former international and Liberec captain Radoslav Kováč.

== Transfers ==
=== In ===
Pos.	Player	Transferred from	Fee	Date	Source
DF	(Czech Republic) Denis Halinský	(Czech Republic) Slavia Prague	Loan	10 July 2024	
MF	(Kosovo) Qëndrim Zyba	(Kosovo) FC Ballkani	Undisclosed	10 July 2024	
DF	(Uganda) Aziz Kayondo	(Spain) CD Leganés B	Undisclosed	11 July 2024	

=== Out ===
Pos.	Player	Transferred to	Fee	Date	Source
FW	(Netherlands) Olaf Kok	(Czech Republic) Vyškov	Loan	3 January 2025	

== Friendlies ==
=== Pre-season ===
22 June 2024 Friendly	Slovan Liberec (Czech Republic)	2–0	(Czech Republic) Varnsdorf	Hrádek nad Nisou
11:00 UTC+2	Pourzitidis 5'; Kok 71' (pen.)			Stadium: Stadion Donín

28 June 2024 Club's tournament – SF	Slovan Liberec (Czech Republic)	1–1 (4–3 p)	(Czech Republic) Chrudim	Benátky nad Jizerou
15:30 UTC+2				Stadium: Městský stadion

29 June 2024 Club's tournament – F	Slovan Liberec (Czech Republic)	0–1	(Czech Republic) Mladá Boleslav	Benátky nad Jizerou
13:30 UTC+2	Lehoczki (red card) 45+1'		Kušej 41'	Stadium: Městský stadion

5 July 2024 Friendly	Slovan Liberec (Czech Republic)	2–0	(Romania) FC Universitatea Cluj	Austria
17:00 UTC+2	Rabušic 52' (pen.); Varfolomeev 90'

9 July 2024 Friendly	Slovan Liberec (Czech Republic)	4–0	(Hungary) Debrecen	Ottensheim, Austria
17:30 UTC+2	Icha 30'; Frýdek 50' (pen.); Dulay 64', 70'			Stadium: Donaustadion

12 July 2024 Friendly	Slovan Liberec (Czech Republic)	1–1	(Hungary) Puskás Akadémia	Austria
11:00 UTC+2	Frýdek 82'		Soisalo 69'

== Competitions ==
=== Overall record ===
Competition	First match	Last match	Starting round	Record							
Competition	First match	Last match	Starting round	Pld	W	D	L	GF	GA	GD	Win %
Czech First League	21 July 2024	19 April 2025	Matchday 1	1	1	0	0	3	1	+2	100.00
Czech Cup				0	0	0	0	0	0	+0	—
Total				1	1	0	0	3	1	+2	100.00

Source: Soccerway

=== Czech First League ===
==== Results summary ====
Overall								Home						Away					
Pld	W	D	L	GF	GA	GD	Pts	W	D	L	GF	GA	GD	W	D	L	GF	GA	GD
1	1	0	0	3	1	+2	3	0	0	0	0	0	0	1	0	0	3	1	+2

Source: Chance Liga

==== Regular season ====
===== League table =====
Pos	Team	Pld	W	D	L	GF	GA	GD	Pts	Qualification or relegation
5	Jablonec	30	15	6	9	47	25	+22	51	Qualification for the championship group
6	Sigma Olomouc	30	12	7	11	46	41	+5	43	Qualification for the championship group
7	Slovan Liberec	30	11	9	10	45	31	+14	42	Qualification for the middle group
8	Karviná	30	11	8	11	40	52	−12	41	Qualification for the middle group
9	Hradec Králové	30	11	7	12	33	31	+2	40	Qualification for the middle group

Source: Chance Liga
Rules for classification: 1) Points; 2) Head-to-head points; 3) Head-to-head goal difference; 4) Head-to-head goals scored; 5) Goal difference; 6) Goals scored; 7) Fair-play ranking; 8) Draw.

Pos	Team	Pld	W	D	L	GF	GA	GD	Pts	Qualification or relegation	SLA	PLZ	OST	SPA	JAB	OLO
1	Slavia Prague (C)	35	29	3	3	77	18	+59	90	Qualification for the Champions League league phase	—	4–3	3–0	2–1	—	—
2	Viktoria Plzeň	35	23	5	7	71	36	+35	74	Qualification for the Champions League second qualifying round	—	—	1–2	2–0	4–1	—
3	Baník Ostrava	35	22	5	8	58	34	+24	71	Qualification for the Europa League second qualifying round	—	—	—	3–2	1–2	0–0
4	Sparta Prague	35	19	6	10	61	44	+17	63	Qualification for the Conference League second qualifying round	—	—	—	—	1–3	1–1
5	Jablonec	35	19	6	10	60	33	+27	63		3–2	—	—	—	—	4–0
6	Sigma Olomouc	35	12	9	14	48	53	−5	45	Qualification for the Europa League play-off round (Note: The winner of the 2024–25 Czech Cup (Sigma Olomouc) qualifies for the Europa League play-off round.)	0–5	1–2	—	—	—	—

Source: Chance Liga
Legend: Blue = home team win; Yellow = draw; Red = away team win.
Rules for classification: 1) Total points; 2) Points earned in regular season; 3) Head-to-head points (regular season); 4) Head-to-head goal difference (regular season); 5) Head-to-head goals scored (regular season); 5) Goal difference (all matches); 6) Goals scored (all matches); 7) Fair-play ranking; 8) Draw.
(C) Champions
Notes:

Pos	Team	Pld	W	D	L	GF	GA	GD	Pts	Qualification or relegation	TEP	MLA	SLO	DUK	PCE	CBU
11	Teplice	35	12	8	15	41	45	−4	44		—	—	1–0	2–2	3–0	—
12	Mladá Boleslav	35	11	8	16	48	48	0	41		1–0	—	2–2	2–3	—	—
13	Slovácko	35	9	11	15	31	56	−25	38		—	—	—	3–2	1–0	0–0
14	Dukla Prague (O)	35	8	10	17	34	55	−21	34	Qualification for the relegation play-offs	—	—	—	—	2–0	2–1
15	Pardubice (O)	35	6	7	22	25	56	−31	25	Qualification for the relegation play-offs	—	2–1	—	—	—	1–0
16	České Budějovice (R)	35	0	6	29	16	86	−70	6	Relegation to FNL	0–3	1–2	—	—	—	—

Source: Chance Liga
Legend: Blue = home team win; Yellow = draw; Red = away team win.
Rules for classification: 1) Total points; 2) Points earned in regular season; 3) Head-to-head points (regular season); 4) Head-to-head goal difference (regular season); 5) Head-to-head goals scored (regular season); 5) Goal difference (all matches); 6) Goals scored (all matches); 7) Fair-play ranking; 8) Draw.
(O) Play-off winners; (R) Relegated

===== Results by round =====
Round	1	2	3	4	5	6	7	8	9	10	11	12	13	14	15	16	17	18	19	20	21	22	23	24	25	26	27	28	29	30
Ground	A	H	H	A	H	A	H	A	H	A	H	A	H	A	H	A	A	H	A	H	A	H	A	H	A	H	A	H	A	H
Result	W																													
Position	1																													
Points	3																													

Source: Chance Liga
A = Away; H = Home; W = Win; D = Draw; L = Loss

===== Matches =====
The match schedule was released on 20 June 2024.

21 July 2024 1	Karviná	1–3	Slovan Liberec	Karviná
14:30 CEST (UTC+2)	Regáli 4'	Report	Višinský 26'; Ševínský 34'; Plechatý (yellow card) 72'; Tupta 87'	Stadium: Městský stadion Attendance: 2,592; Referee: Dominik Starý

28 July 2024 2	Slovan Liberec	v	Sigma Olomouc	Liberec
14:30 CEST (UTC+2)				Stadium: Stadion u Nisy

2 August 2024 3	Slovan Liberec	v	Slavia Prague	Liberec
17:30 CEST (UTC+2)				Stadium: Stadion u Nisy

10 August 2024 4	Teplice	v	Slovan Liberec	Teplice
17:00 CEST (UTC+2)				Stadium: Na Stínadlech

18 August 2024 5	Slovan Liberec	v	Pardubice	Liberec
17:00 CEST (UTC+2)				Stadium: Stadion u Nisy

24 August 2024 6	Baník Ostrava	v	Slovan Liberec	Ostrava
CEST (UTC+2)				Stadium: Městský stadion

31 August 2024 7	Slovan Liberec	v	Viktoria Plzeň	Liberec
CEST (UTC+2)				Stadium: Stadion u Nisy

14 September 2024 8	Mladá Boleslav	v	Slovan Liberec	Mladá Boleslav
CEST (UTC+2)				Stadium: Lokotrans Aréna

21 September 2024 9	Slovan Liberec	v	Bohemians 1905	Liberec
CEST (UTC+2)				Stadium: Stadion u Nisy

28 September 2024 10	Dukla Prague	v	Slovan Liberec	Prague
CEST (UTC+2)				Stadium: Stadion Juliska

5 October 2024 11	Slovan Liberec	v	Jablonec	Liberec
CEST (UTC+2)				Stadium: Stadion u Nisy

19 October 2024 12	Sparta Prague	v	Slovan Liberec	Prague
CEST (UTC+2)				Stadium: epet ARENA

26 October 2024 13	Slovan Liberec	v	Slovácko	Liberec
CEST (UTC+2)				Stadium: Stadion u Nisy

2 November 2024 14	České Budějovice	v	Slovan Liberec	České Budějovice
CET (UTC+1)				Stadium: Stadion Střelecký ostrov

9 November 2024 15	Slovan Liberec	v	Hradec Králové	Liberec
CET (UTC+1)				Stadium: Stadion u Nisy

23 November 2024 16	Sigma Olomouc	v	Slovan Liberec	Olomouc
CET (UTC+1)				Stadium: Andrův stadion

30 November 2024 17	Slavia Prague	v	Slovan Liberec	Prague
CET (UTC+1)				Stadium: Fortuna Arena

7 December 2024 18	Slovan Liberec	v	Teplice	Liberec
CET (UTC+1)				Stadium: Stadion u Nisy

14 December 2024 19	Pardubice	v	Slovan Liberec	Pardubice
CET (UTC+1)				Stadium: CFIG Arena

1 February 2025 20	Slovan Liberec	v	Baník Ostrava	Liberec
CET (UTC+1)				Stadium: Stadion u Nisy

8 February 2025 21	Viktoria Plzeň	v	Slovan Liberec	Plzeň
CET (UTC+1)				Stadium: Doosan Arena

15 February 2025 22	Slovan Liberec	v	Mladá Boleslav	Liberec
CET (UTC+1)				Stadium: Stadion u Nisy

22 February 2025 23	Bohemians 1905	v	Slovan Liberec	Prague
CET (UTC+1)				Stadium: Ďolíček

1 March 2025 24	Slovan Liberec	v	Dukla Prague	Liberec
CET (UTC+1)				Stadium: Stadion u Nisy

8 March 2025 25	Jablonec	v	Slovan Liberec	Jablonec nad Nisou
CET (UTC+1)				Stadium: Stadion Střelnice

15 March 2025 26	Slovan Liberec	v	Sparta Prague	Liberec
CET (UTC+1)				Stadium: Stadion u Nisy

29 March 2025 27	Slovácko	v	Slovan Liberec	Uherské Hradiště
CET (UTC+1)				Stadium: Městský fotbalový stadion Miroslava Valenty

5 April 2025 28	Slovan Liberec	v	České Budějovice	Liberec
CEST (UTC+2)				Stadium: Stadion u Nisy

12 April 2025 29	Hradec Králové	v	Slovan Liberec	Hradec Králové
CEST (UTC+2)				Stadium: Malšovická aréna

19 April 2025 30	Slovan Liberec	v	Karviná	Liberec
CEST (UTC+2)				Stadium: Stadion u Nisy
