= Dominik Preisler =

Czech footballer (born 1995)

Personal information
- Date of birth: 20 September 1995 (age 31)
- Place of birth: Czech Republic
- Height: 1.86 m (6 ft 1 in)
- Position: Defender

Team information
- Current team: Artis Brno
- Number: 27

Youth career
- Dukla Prague

Senior career*
Years	Team	Apps	(Gls)
2015–2021	Dukla Prague	72	(11)
2018–2019	→ Jihlava (loan)	22	(0)
2021	→ Mladá Boleslav (loan)	19	(0)
2021–2022	Mladá Boleslav	19	(0)
2022–2025	Slovan Liberec	66	(2)
2025–2026	Ruch Chorzów	32	(2)
2026–	Artis Brno	0	(0)

International career
2016	Czech Republic U20	3	(0)
- * Club domestic league appearances and goals as of 14:48, 29 May 2026 (UTC)

Dominik Preisler (born 20 September 1995) is a Czech professional footballer who plays as a defender for Czech First League club Artis Brno.

== Club career ==
He made his Czech First League debut for Slovan Liberec as a substitute in a 4–0 win against Teplice in November 2015.

On 18 February 2025, Preisler signed a contract with Polish second-tier club Ruch Chorzów until 30 June 2026.

On 22 June 2026, Preisler agreed to join Artis Brno on a two-year contract.

== Career statistics ==
As of match played 24 May 2026

Appearances and goals by club, season and competition
Club	Season	League			National cup (Note: Includes Czech Cup, Polish Cup)		Other		Total	
Club	Season	Division	Apps	Goals	Apps	Goals	Apps	Goals	Apps	Goals
Dukla Prague	2015–16	Czech First League	5	0	3	0	—		8	0
Dukla Prague	2016–17	Czech First League	11	2	3	0	—		14	2
Dukla Prague	2017–18	Czech First League	16	2	1	0	—		17	2
Dukla Prague	2018–19	Czech First League	2	0	0	0	—		2	0
Dukla Prague	2019–20	National Football League	29	6	3	2	—		29	6
Dukla Prague	2020–21	National Football League	9	1	1	1	—		10	2
Dukla Prague	Total		72	11	11	3	0	0	83	14
Jihlava (loan)	2018–19	National Football League	20	0	1	0	2 (Note: Appearances in National Football League promotion play-offs)	0	23	0
Mladá Boleslav (loan)	2020–21	Czech First League	19	0	2	1	—		21	1
Mladá Boleslav	2021–22	Czech First League	19	0	2	0	—		21	0
Mladá Boleslav	Total		38	0	4	1	—		42	1
Slovan Liberec	2022–23	Czech First League	25	0	3	0	1 (Note: Appearance in Czech First League placement play-offs)	0	29	0
Slovan Liberec	2023–24	Czech First League	25	2	2	0	2 (Note: Appearances in Czech First League Conference League play-offs)	0	29	2
Slovan Liberec	2024–25	Czech First League	15	0	2	0	—		17	0
Slovan Liberec	Total		65	2	7	0	3	0	75	2
Ruch Chorzów	2024–25	I liga	12	2	1	0	—		13	2
Ruch Chorzów	2025–26	I liga	20	0	0	0	—		20	0
Ruch Chorzów	Total		32	2	1	0	—		33	2
Artis Brno	2026–27	National Football League	0	0	0	0	—		0	0
Career total			227	15	24	4	5	0	256	19
