= Luka Kulenović =

Bosnian footballer (born 1999)

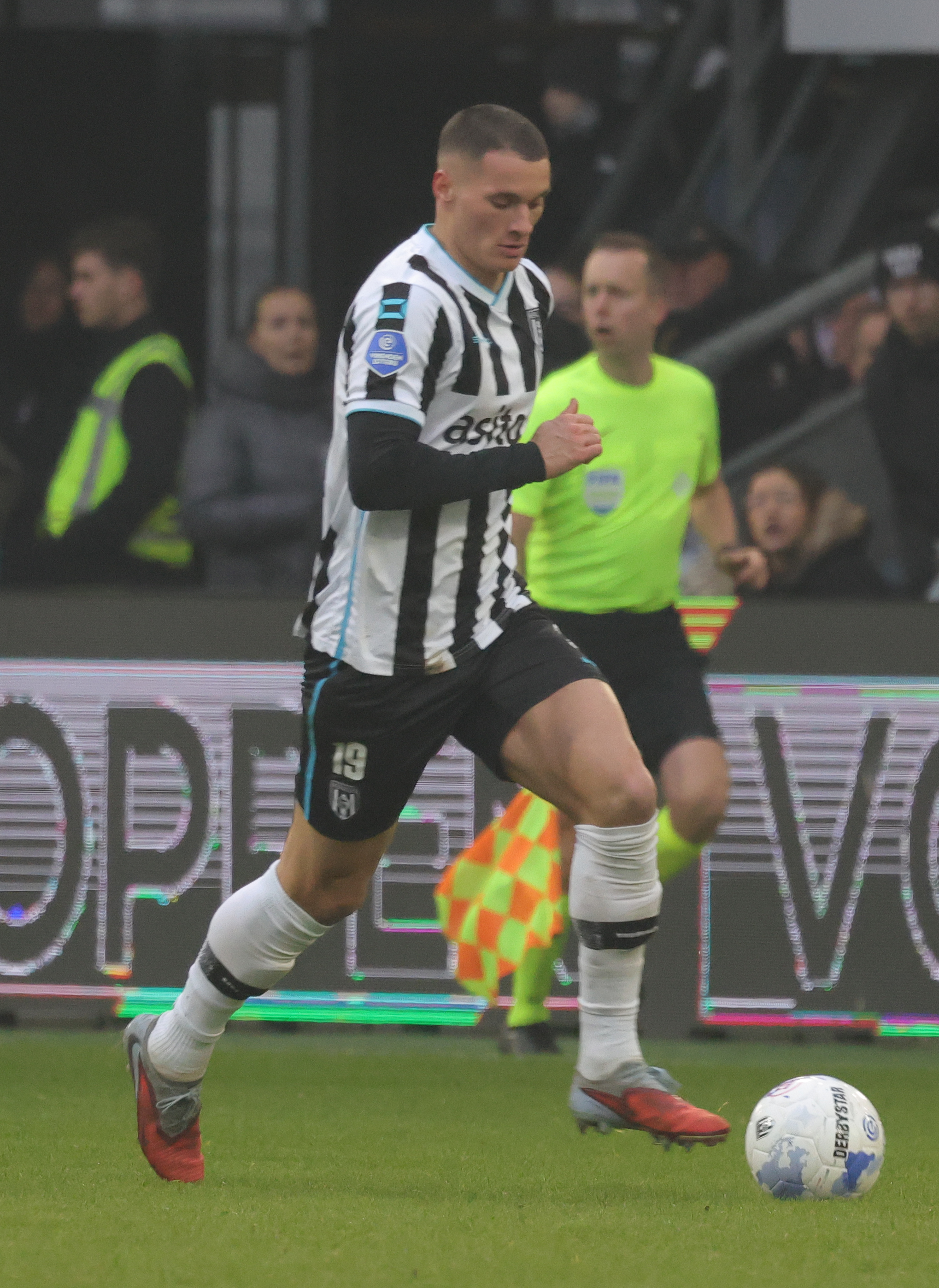
- Kulenović playing for Heracles Almelo in 2026

Personal information
- Date of birth: 29 September 1999 (age 27)
- Place of birth: Toronto, Ontario, Canada
- Height: 1.90 m (6 ft 3 in)
- Position: Forward

Team information
- Current team: Győr (on loan from Heracles Almelo)
- Number: 9

Youth career
- Borac Banja Luka
- 2016–2017: Krupa
- 2017–2018: Trenčín

Senior career*
Years	Team	Apps	(Gls)
2018–2019	Željezničar Banja Luka	28	(13)
2019–2020	Osijek II	6	(0)
2020	Kustošija	2	(0)
2020–2022	Rudar Prijedor	48	(5)
2022–2023	Sloga Doboj	17	(6)
2023–2024	Slovan Liberec	29	(7)
2024–	Heracles Almelo	55	(14)
2026–	→ Győr (loan)	8	(5)

International career^{‡}
2024–	Bosnia and Herzegovina	3	(0)
- * Club domestic league appearances and goals as of 21 November 2026 ‡ National team caps and goals as of 10 June 2025

Luka Kulenović (pronounced [lûːka kulêːnoʋitɕ]; born 29 September 1999) is a professional footballer who plays as a forward for Nemzeti Bajnokság I club Győr, on loan from Heracles Almelo. Born in Canada, he plays for the Bosnia and Herzegovina national team.

Kulenović started his professional career at Željezničar Banja Luka, before joining Osijek II in 2019. In 2020, he switched to Kustošija. Later that year, he signed with Rudar Prijedor. Two years later, he joined Sloga Doboj. Kulenović was transferred to Slovan Liberec in 2023. The following year, he moved to Heracles Almelo, who loaned him to Győr in 2026.

Kulenović made his senior international debut for Bosnia and Herzegovina in 2024.

== Club career ==
=== Early career ===
Kulenović started playing football at Borac Banja Luka and played in the youth setups of Krupa and Trenčín, before signing with Željezničar Banja Luka in August 2018. He made his professional debut against Tekstilac on 25 August at the age of 18 and managed to score a goal. Kulenović scored his first career hat-trick in a triumph over Podrinje Janja on 18 May 2019.

In August, he joined Croatian team Osijek II. In February 2020, he switched to Kustošija.

In June, he went to Rudar Prijedor.

In June 2022, he moved to Sloga Doboj.

In July 2023, Kulenović signed for Czech side Slovan Liberec.

In July 2024, he was transferred to Dutch outfit Heracles Almelo. In September 2026, he was sent on a season-long loan to Hungarian team Győr.

== International career ==
In November 2024, Kulenović received his first senior call up to Bosnia and Herzegovina, for 2024–25 UEFA Nations League A games against Germany and the Netherlands. He debuted against the former on 16 November.

== Career statistics ==
=== Club ===
As of match played 21 November 2026

Appearances and goals by club, season and competition
Club	Season	League			National cup (Note: Includes Bosnian Cup, Czech Cup, KNVB Cup, Magyar Kupa)		Continental		Other		Total	
Club	Season	Division	Apps	Goals	Apps	Goals	Apps	Goals	Apps	Goals	Apps	Goals
Željezničar Banja Luka	2018–19	First League of the RS	28	13	–		–		–		28	13
Osijek II	2019–20	Croatian First League	6	0	–		–		–		6	0
Kustošija	2019–20	Croatian First League	2	0	–		–		–		2	0
Rudar Prijedor	2020–21	First League of the RS	23	4	2	0	–		–		25	4
Rudar Prijedor	2021–22	Bosnian Premier League	25	1	1	0	–		–		26	1
Rudar Prijedor	Total		48	5	3	0	–		–		51	5
Sloga Doboj	2022–23	Bosnian Premier League	17	6	0	0	–		–		17	6
Slovan Liberec	2023–24	Czech First League	29	7	2	0	–		1 (Note: Appearances in Czech First League play-offs for UEFA Conference League)	0	32	7
Heracles Almelo	2024–25	Eredivisie	24	9	3	1	–		–		27	10
Heracles Almelo	2025–26	Eredivisie	29	5	3	1	–		–		32	6
Heracles Almelo	2026–27	Eerste Divisie	2	0	0	0	–		–		2	0
Heracles Almelo	Total		55	14	6	2	–		–		61	16
Győr (loan)	2026–27	Nemzeti Bajnokság I	8	5	1	0	–		–		9	5
Career total			193	50	12	2	–		1	0	206	52

=== International ===
As of match played 10 June 2025

Appearances and goals by national team and year
National team	Year	Apps	Goals
Bosnia and Herzegovina
Bosnia and Herzegovina	2024	2	0
Bosnia and Herzegovina	2025	1	0
Total		3	0

== Honours ==
Rudar Prijedor

- First League of the RS: 2020–21
