= Denis Višinský =

Czech footballer (born 2003)

Personal information
- Date of birth: 21 March 2003 (age 23)
- Place of birth: Hořín, Czech Republic
- Height: 1.77 m (5 ft 10 in)
- Position: Winger

Team information
- Current team: Viktoria Plzeň
- Number: 9

Youth career
- 2009–2010: FC Mělník
- 2010–2021: Slavia Prague

Senior career*
Years	Team	Apps	(Gls)
2021–2022	Slavia Prague	2	(0)
2021–2022	→ Vlašim (loan)	15	(3)
2022–2025	Slovan Liberec	76	(10)
2025–	Viktoria Plzeň	27	(8)

International career^{‡}
2018–2019	Czech Republic U16	8	(2)
2019–2020	Czech Republic U17	6	(2)
2021–2022	Czech Republic U19	12	(1)
2022	Czech Republic U20	3	(1)
2023–2026	Czech Republic U21	8	(0)
2026–	Czech Republic	3	(1)
- * Club domestic league appearances and goals as of 17 May 2026 ‡ National team caps and goals as of 25 June 2026

Denis Višinský (born 21 March 2003) is a Czech professional footballer who plays as a winger for Viktoria Plzeň and the Czech Republic national team.

== Life ==
Višinský was born in Hořín, where he also started to play football at the age of three. His family then moved to Mělník.

== Club career ==
Višinský is a youth product of Slavia Prague, having joined their youth academy at the age of six. He signed his first professional contract with them in February 2021. Višinský made his professional debut with Slavia Prague in a 3–0 Czech First League win over FK Mladá Boleslav on 14 March 2021.

On 26 May 2025, Višinský signed a three-year contract with Viktoria Plzeň as a free agent.

== International career ==
On 31 May 2026, Višinský was selected in the 26-man squad for the 2026 FIFA World Cup.

== Career statistics ==
=== Club ===
As of match played 17 May 2026

Appearances and goals by club, season and competition
Club	Season	League			Cup		Europe		Other		Total	
Club	Season	Division	Apps	Goals	Apps	Goals	Apps	Goals	Apps	Goals	Apps	Goals
Slavia Prague	2020–21	Czech First League	2	0	1	2	1 (Note: Appearances in UEFA Europa League)	0	—		4	2
Vlašim (loan)	2021–22	Czech National Football League	15	3	3	2	—		—		18	5
Slovan Liberec	2021–22	Czech First League	9	0	—		—		—		9	0
Slovan Liberec	2022–23	Czech First League	15	1	3	2	—		—		18	3
Slovan Liberec	2023–24	Czech First League	21	0	3	0	—		—		24	0
Slovan Liberec	2024–25	Czech First League	31	9	2	1	—		—		33	10
Slovan Liberec	Total		76	10	8	3	—		—		84	13
Viktoria Plzeň	2025–26	Czech First League	27	8	2	0	12 (Note: Two appearances in UEFA Champions League, ten appearances and one goal in UEFA Europa League)	1	—		41	9
Career total			120	21	14	7	13	1	0	0	147	29

=== International ===
As of match played 24 June 2026

Appearances and goals by national team and year
National team	Year	Apps	Goals
Czech Republic	2026	3	1
Total		3	1

List of international goals scored by Denis Višinský
No.	Date	Venue	Opponent	Score	Result	Competition
1	4 June 2026	Sports Illustrated Stadium, Harrison, United States	Guatemala	3–1	3–1	Friendly
