= Theodor Gebre Selassie =

Czech footballer (born 1986)

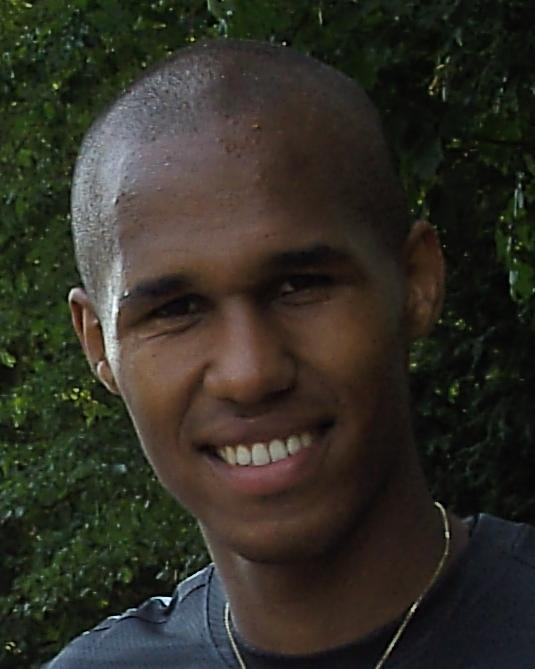
- Gebre Selassie in 2012

Personal information
- Date of birth: 24 December 1986 (age 39)
- Place of birth: Třebíč, Czechoslovakia
- Height: 1.81 m (5 ft 11 in)
- Positions: Right-back; wing-back

Team information
- Current team: Slovan Liberec (sporting director)

Youth career
- 1992–1998: Velké Meziříčí
- 1998–2005: Vysočina Jihlava

Senior career*
| Years | Team | Apps | (Gls) |
| 2005–2007 | Vysočina Jihlava | 18 | (2) |
| 2005–2006 | → Velké Meziříčí (loan) | 8 | (0) |
| 2007–2008 | Slavia Prague | 11 | (0) |
| 2008–2012 | Slovan Liberec | 97 | (8) |
| 2012–2021 | Werder Bremen | 271 | (23) |
| 2021–2023 | Slovan Liberec | 46 | (1) |
| Total | | 451 | (34) |

International career
| 2007–2008 | Czech Republic U21 | 6 | (0) |
| 2011–2019 | Czech Republic | 54 | (3) |
- * Club domestic league appearances and goals

Theodor Gebre Selassie (Ge'ez: ገብረ ሥላሴ, romanized: Gebre Silassē; born 24 December 1986) is a Czech former professional footballer who played as a right-back or as wing-back. He earned 54 caps and scored three goals with the Czech national team.

Having won the Czech First League with Slavia Prague in 2008 and Slovan Liberec four years later, he signed for Werder Bremen on a four-year contract. He stayed with Werder Bremen for nine years, making 271 league appearances and scoring 23 goals.

Gebre Selassie made his international debut for the Czech Republic in 2011, becoming their first player of African descent. He was selected in their squad for UEFA Euro 2012 and UEFA Euro 2016.

== Personal life ==
Gebre Selassie was born in 1986 in Třebíč in Czechoslovakia. His father, Chamola, is Ethiopian and arrived in the country as a doctor during the communist period. His mother, Jana, is Czech and a schoolteacher. Gebre Selassie has a younger sister named Anna, who plays for the Czech Republic women's national handball team.

== Club career ==
=== Early career in the Czech Republic ===
Gebre Selassie began his football career in 1992, developing within the Czech youth system. For the next six years, he was a member of the Velké Meziříčí junior squad. He subsequently moved to Vysočina Jihlava, where he played for the club's youth team between 1998 and 2005.

As his family placed great importance on education, Gebre Selassie later almost abandoned football altogether to concentrate on a university degree. However, he eventually opted to join Velké Meziříčí's senior side in 2005.

Gebre Selassie subsequently had a brief stint with Slavia Prague in the 2007–08 season, during which he won the Czech First League title. He then played for Slovan Liberec, where he again won the league title in the 2011–12 season.

=== Werder Bremen ===
After playing all four of the Czech Republic's matches at UEFA Euro 2012, Gebre Selassie was signed by Werder Bremen of the German Bundesliga on a four-year deal on 22 June. On 24 August 2012, he scored a goal in Bremen's first game of the season, heading an equaliser in a 1–2 away loss against reigning champions Borussia Dortmund. Gebre Selassie made 24 starts that season, with the opening day goal being his only of the season.

In the 2013–14 season, Gebre Selassie made only 18 starts, coming on as a substitute 11 times and scoring his only two goals of the season in the final three matches. He missed the first eight games of the 2014–15 season with an ankle injury. After coming on as a substitute in his first appearance of the season, he started the final 25 matches of the season under manager Viktor Skrypnyk, whose first match of the season after taking over for Robin Dutt coincided with Gebre Selassie's first start. On 18 February 2015, Gebre Selassie signed a contract extension with Werder Bremen, keeping him at the Weserstadion through the 2017–18 season. Gebre Selassie also scored three goals on the season.

Gebre Selassie was a fixture in Skrypnyk's lineup at right back during the 2015–16 campaign, making 33 starts in the Bundesliga, as well as playing the full-time in all five of the club's DFB-Pokal fixtures during their run to the semi-finals. On 8 November, he picked up a concussion following a collision with goalkeeper Felix Wiedwald toward the end of a match at FC Augsburg, causing him to miss their next match against Wolfsburg. Gebre Selassie scored his only goal of the season on 5 March against Hannover 96, also tacking on an assist in the 4–1 victory.

After Werder lost their first five matches of the 2016–17 season, including a first round upset in the DFB-Pokal to third tier Sportfreunde Lotte, resulting in the sacking of Skrypnyk, Gebre Selassie scored a stoppage time winner against Wolfsburg to give the club their first points of the season, after Lennart Thy had equalized five minutes prior in the 2–1 victory. During the season, he made 30 league appearances scoring 5 goals.

In July 2017, Gebre Selassie extended his contract with Werder Bremen.

In February 2019, he made his 200th Bundesliga appearance for the club.

In May 2021, after the conclusion of the 2020–21 season which ended in relegation from the Bundesliga, Werder Bremen announced that Selassie's contract would not be extended.

=== Slovan Liberec ===
In June 2021, Gebre Selassie returned to former club Slovan Liberec. In June 2023, following the 2022–23 season, he announced his retirement from playing.

On 4 April 2024, Gebre Selassie became new sporting director of the club.

== International career ==
In May 2011, Gebre Selassie received his first call-up to the Czech Republic national football team. On 4 June, he became the first player of African descent to play for the country, making his debut as a half-time substitute for Ondřej Kušnír in a goalless draw against Peru at the Kirin Cup at Matsumotodaira Football Stadium in Matsumoto, Japan.

Gebre Selassie was later given the number 2 shirt in the Czech squad for UEFA Euro 2012. He was allegedly the target of racist chanting from Russia fans during the Czech Republic's match against Russia, which ended in a 4–1 victory for Russia. During the tournament, he received attention from some of Europe's most successful clubs. He started all four of the Czechs' games, as the side won its group before eventually losing to Portugal in the quarter-finals. He scored his first senior international goal on 12 October 2012 in a 2014 World Cup qualifier against Malta, opening a 3–1 victory in Plzeň.

On 5 June, in a warm-up game for UEFA Euro 2016 at the Eden Arena, Gebre Selassie was sent off for two bookings in a 1–2 loss to South Korea.

In May 2019, Gebre Selassie announced his retirement from the national team.

== Career statistics ==
=== Club ===
Appearances and goals by club, season and competition
| Club | Season | League | | | Cup (Note: Includes Czech Cup, DFB-Pokal) | | Europe (Note: Includes UEFA Europa League, UEFA Champions League) | | Other | | Total | |
| Club | Season | Division | Apps | Goals | Apps | Goals | Apps | Goals | Apps | Goals | Apps | Goals |
|---|---|---|---|---|---|---|---|---|---|---|---|---|
| Slavia Prague | 2007–08 | Czech First League | 9 | 0 | — | | — | | — | | 9 | 0 |
| Slavia Prague | 2008–09 | Czech First League | 2 | 0 | — | | 1 | 0 | — | | 3 | 0 |
| Slavia Prague | Total | | 11 | 0 | 0 | 0 | 1 | 0 | 0 | 0 | 12 | 0 |
| Slovan Liberec | 2008–09 | Czech First League | 21 | 1 | — | | — | | — | | 21 | 1 |
| Slovan Liberec | 2009–10 | Czech First League | 17 | 2 | — | | 4 | 0 | — | | 21 | 2 |
| Slovan Liberec | 2010–11 | Czech First League | 29 | 0 | — | | — | | — | | 29 | 0 |
| Slovan Liberec | 2011–12 | Czech First League | 30 | 5 | 4 | 0 | — | | — | | 34 | 5 |
| Slovan Liberec | Total | | 97 | 8 | 4 | 0 | 4 | 0 | 0 | 0 | 105 | 8 |
| Werder Bremen | 2012–13 | Bundesliga | 27 | 1 | 1 | 0 | — | | — | | 28 | 1 |
| Werder Bremen | 2013–14 | Bundesliga | 29 | 2 | 1 | 0 | — | | — | | 30 | 2 |
| Werder Bremen | 2014–15 | Bundesliga | 26 | 3 | 2 | 0 | — | | — | | 28 | 3 |
| Werder Bremen | 2015–16 | Bundesliga | 33 | 1 | 5 | 0 | — | | — | | 38 | 1 |
| Werder Bremen | 2016–17 | Bundesliga | 30 | 5 | 1 | 0 | — | | — | | 31 | 5 |
| Werder Bremen | 2017–18 | Bundesliga | 32 | 3 | 4 | 0 | — | | — | | 36 | 3 |
| Werder Bremen | 2018–19 | Bundesliga | 32 | 3 | 4 | 0 | — | | — | | 36 | 3 |
| Werder Bremen | 2019–20 | Bundesliga | 28 | 2 | 2 | 0 | — | | 2 (Note: Appearances in Bundesliga relegation playoffs) | 0 | 32 | 2 |
| Werder Bremen | 2020–21 | Bundesliga | 34 | 3 | 5 | 1 | — | | – | | 39 | 4 |
| Werder Bremen | Total | | 271 | 23 | 25 | 1 | 0 | 0 | 2 | 0 | 298 | 24 |
| Slovan Liberec | 2021–22 | Czech First League | 30 | 0 | 0 | 0 | — | | — | | 30 | 0 |
| Slovan Liberec | 2022–23 | Czech First League | 16 | 1 | 3 | 2 | — | | — | | 19 | 3 |
| Slovan Liberec | Total | | 46 | 1 | 3 | 2 | 0 | 0 | 0 | 0 | 49 | 3 |
| Career total | | | 425 | 32 | 32 | 3 | 5 | 0 | 2 | 0 | 464 | 35 |

=== International ===
Appearances and goals by national team and year
| National team | Year | Apps | Goals |
|---|---|---|---|
| Czech Republic | 2011 | 7 | 0 |
| Czech Republic | 2012 | 12 | 1 |
| Czech Republic | 2013 | 8 | 0 |
| Czech Republic | 2014 | 1 | 0 |
| Czech Republic | 2015 | 4 | 0 |
| Czech Republic | 2016 | 7 | 0 |
| Czech Republic | 2017 | 6 | 2 |
| Czech Republic | 2018 | 7 | 0 |
| Czech Republic | 2019 | 2 | 0 |
| Total | | 54 | 3 |

Scores and results list the Czech Republic's goal tally first, score column indicates score after each Gebre Selassie goal.

List of international goals scored by Theodor Gebre Selassie
| No. | Date | Venue | Opponent | Score | Result | Competition |
|---|---|---|---|---|---|---|
| 1 | 12 October 2012 | Stadion města Plzně, Plzeň, Czech Republic | Malta | 1–0 | 3–1 | 2014 FIFA World Cup qualification |
| 2 | 26 March 2017 | San Marino Stadium, Serravalle, San Marino | San Marino | 4–0 | 6–0 | 2018 FIFA World Cup qualification |
| 3 | 10 June 2017 | Ullevaal Stadion, Oslo, Norway | Norway | 1–0 | 1–1 | 2018 FIFA World Cup qualification |

== Honours ==
Slavia Prague

- Czech First League: 2007–08

Slovan Liberec

- Czech First League: 2011–12

Czech Republic

- China Cup bronze: 2018
