= Matěj Chaluš =

Czech footballer (born 1998)

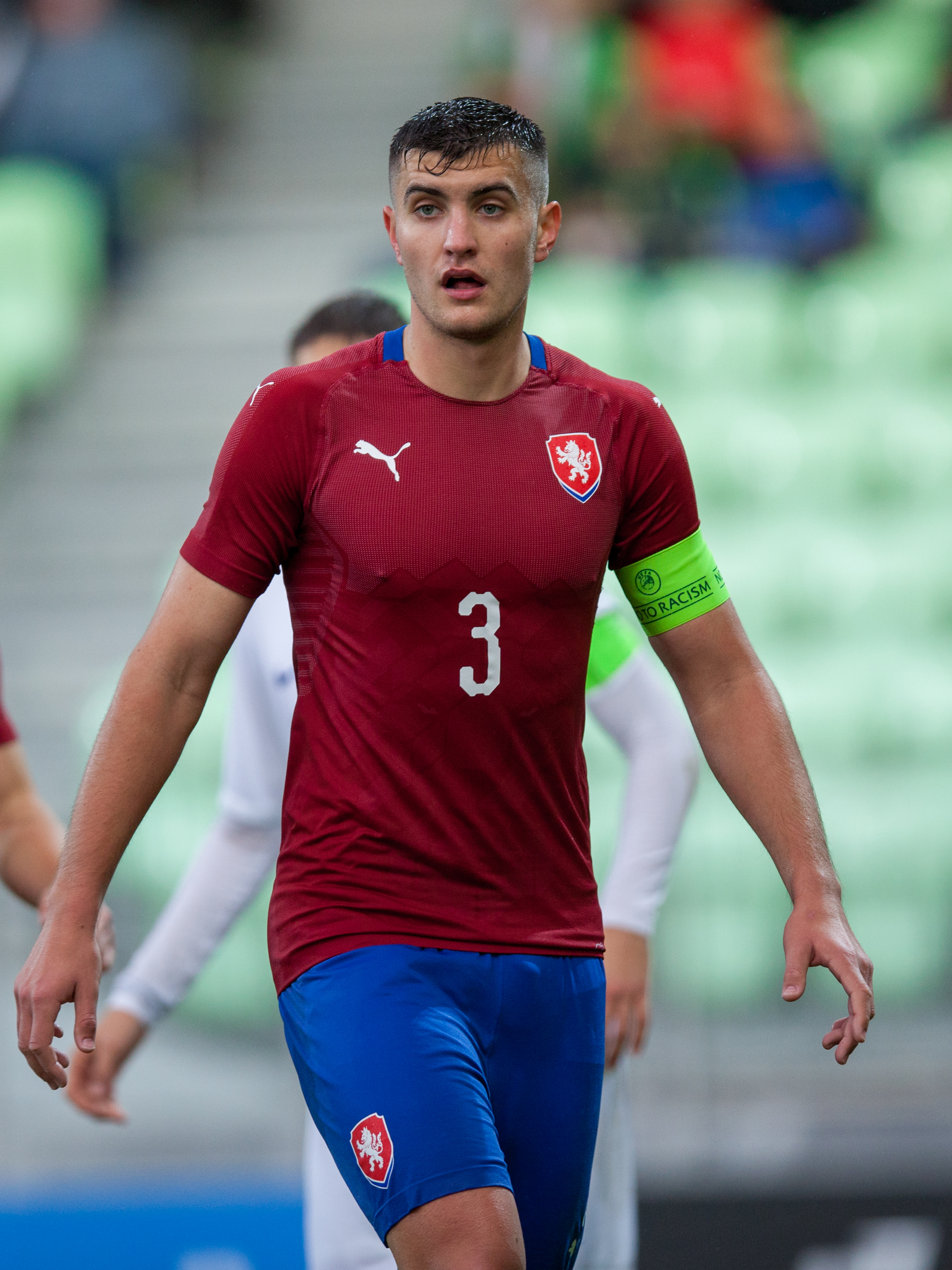
- Chaluš with the Czech Republic U21 in 2019

Personal information
- Full name: Matěj Chaluš
- Date of birth: 2 February 1998 (age 28)
- Place of birth: Prague, Czech Republic
- Height: 1.89 m (6 ft 2 in)
- Position: Centre-back

Team information
- Current team: Baník Ostrava
- Number: 37

Youth career
- Sparta Prague
- → Jablonec (loan)
- → Bohemians 1905 (loan)
- 2015: Příbram

Senior career*
Years	Team	Apps	(Gls)
2015–2017	Příbram	37	(0)
2017–2019	Slavia Prague	0	(0)
2017–2019	→ Mladá Boleslav (loan)	32	(3)
2019	→ Příbram (loan)	8	(0)
2019–2022	Slovan Liberec	53	(1)
2022–2024	Malmö FF	10	(0)
2023	→ FC Groningen (loan)	8	(0)
2023–2024	→ Slovan Liberec (loan)	32	(3)
2024–	Baník Ostrava	55	(0)

International career
2014	Czech Republic U16	2	(0)
2014–2015	Czech Republic U17	16	(2)
2015–2016	Czech Republic U18	8	(0)
2016–2017	Czech Republic U19	19	(0)
2017–2018	Czech Republic U20	10	(1)
2018–2019	Czech Republic U21	11	(0)
2022	Czech Republic	1	(0)
- * Club domestic league appearances and goals as of 25 May 2026

Matěj Chaluš (born 2 February 1998) is a Czech professional footballer who players as a centre-back for Czech club Baník Ostrava. He has played for the Czech Republic national team.

== Career ==
After Příbram was relegated to the Czech National Football League in 2016, Chaluš signed for Slavia Prague for an undisclosed fee. He immediately went on loan to Mladá Boleslav. The loan was supposed to be two seasons long with Slavia retaining the possibility to recall him after one year.

In February 2019, Chaluš returned to Příbram on loan until the end of the season. In June 2023, he returned to Slovan Liberec on loan until the end of the year. On 28 June 2024, Chaluš signed a three-year contract with Baník Ostrava.

== International career ==
On 8 November 2022, Chaluš was called up to the Czech senior squad for matches against Faroe Islands and Turkey. He made his debut and only appearance against the former opponent.
