= Victor Olatunji =

Nigerian footballer (born 1999)

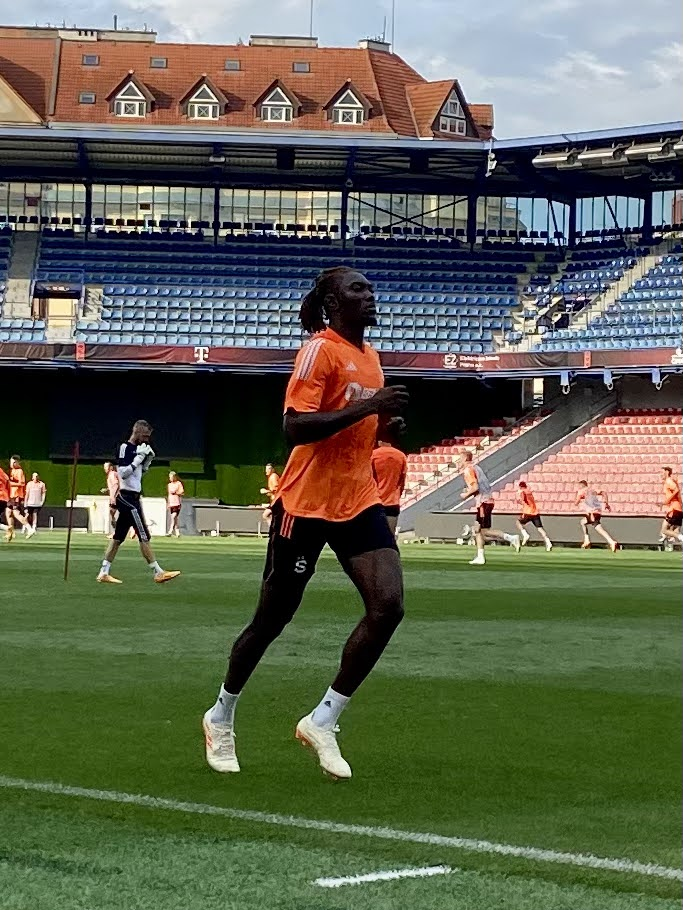
- Olatunji in 2023

Personal information
- Full name: Victor Oluyemi Olatunji
- Date of birth: 5 September 1999 (age 27)
- Place of birth: Sokoto, Nigeria
- Height: 1.91 m (6 ft 3 in)
- Position: Forward

Team information
- Current team: Beveren (on loan from Real Salt Lake)
- Number: 33

Senior career*
Years	Team	Apps	(Gls)
–2017	Lagos Islanders		
2017–2018	Inter Bratislava	11	(2)
2019–2020	Železiarne Podbrezová	9	(0)
2019–2020	→ Mattersburg (loan)	14	(0)
2019–2020	→ Mattersburg II (loan)	7	(7)
2020–2021	Alki Oroklini	12	(2)
2021–2023	AEK Larnaca	15	(1)
2023	→ Slovan Liberec (loan)	19	(8)
2023	Slovan Liberec	0	(0)
2023–2025	Sparta Prague	57	(10)
2025–	Real Salt Lake	25	(5)
2026–	→ Beveren (loan)	0	(0)
- * Club domestic league appearances and goals as of 17:44, 4 September 2026 (UTC)

Victor Oluyemi Olatunji (born 5 September 1999) is a Nigerian professional footballer who plays as a forward for Belgian Pro League club Beveren on loan from Major League Soccer club Real Salt Lake.

== Career ==
=== Železiarne Podbrezová ===
Olatunji made his professional debut for Železiarne Podbrezová against Nitra on 16 February 2019. Olatunji came on after some hour of play, as a replacement for Daniel Pavúk. While on the pitch, Podbrezová sealed off the win 3–1, through a late goal by Lukáš Urbanič.

=== Larnaca ===
On 19 May 2021, he signed a new two-year contract with AEK Larnaca.

=== Sparta Prague ===
On 17 July 2023, Olatunji signed a multi-year contract with Sparta Prague. He scored the fourth goal in the 87th minute in a 4–1 comeback (5–4 aggregate) against Dinamo Zagreb in order to qualify for the 2023–24 UEFA Europa League.

He scored the second goal in 3–0 Champions League win against Red Bull Salzburg on 18 September 2024, also providing an assist to Qazim Laçi for the third goal of the match. Hence, he became the first Nigerian and the third African player to score and assist on his competition debut, following Daniel Cousin and Serge Aurier.

=== Real Salt Lake ===
On 6 August 2025, Olatunji signed a contract with Major League Soccer club Real Salt Lake.

On 4 September 2026, Olatunji moved on loan to Beveren in Belgium for the 2026–27 season.

== Career statistics ==
As of match played 1 March 2025

Appearances and goals by club, season and competition
Club	Season	League			Cup		Europe		Other		Total	
Club	Season	Division	Apps	Goals	Apps	Goals	Apps	Goals	Apps	Goals	Apps	Goals
Inter Bratislava	2018–19	2. Liga	14	1	2	1	—		—		16	2
Železiarne Podbrezová	2018–19	Slovak First Football League	9	0	—		—		—		9	0
Mattersburg (loan)	2019–20	Austrian Bundesliga	14	0	0	0	—		—		14	0
Mattersburg II (loan)	2019–20	Austrian Regionalliga East	7	7	—		—		—		7	7
Alki Oroklini	2020–21	Cypriot Second Division	12	22	2	1	—		—		14	23
AEK Larnaca	2021–22	Cypriot First Division	7	0	5	2	—		—		12	2
AEK Larnaca	2022–23	Cypriot First Division	8	1	1	0	11 (Note: Two appearances and one goal in UEFA Champions League, nine appearances in UEFA Europa League)	1	—		20	2
AEK Larnaca	Total		15	1	6	2	11	1	—		32	4
Slovan Liberec (loan)	2022–23	Czech First League	18	8	1	0	—		—		19	8
Sparta Prague	2023–24	Czech First League	30	3	5	3	12 (Note: One appearance and one goal in UEFA Champions League, eleven appearances and one goal in UEFA Europa League)	2	—		47	8
Sparta Prague	2024–25	Czech First League	20	7	2	1	14 (Note: Appearances in UEFA Champions League)	4	—		36	12
Sparta Prague	Total		50	10	7	4	26	6	0	0	83	20
Career total			139	49	18	8	37	7	0	0	194	64

== Honours ==
Sparta Prague

- Czech First League: 2023–24
- Czech Cup: 2023–24
