= Filip Prebsl =

Czech footballer (born 2004)

Personal information
- Date of birth: 4 March 2004 (age 22)
- Place of birth: Czech Republic
- Height: 1.86 m (6 ft 1 in)
- Position: Defensive midfielder

Team information
- Current team: Viktoria Plzeň
- Number: 98

Youth career
- 2015–2021: Slavia Prague

Senior career*
Years	Team	Apps	(Gls)
2021–2026	Slavia Prague	13	(1)
2021	→ Viktoria Žižkov (loan)	4	(0)
2021	→ Vlašim (loan)	9	(0)
2022–2024	→ Slovan Liberec (loan)	52	(3)
2025	→ Górnik Zabrze (loan)	6	(0)
2025	→ Mladá Boleslav (loan)	18	(0)
2026	→ Karviná (loan)	11	(0)
2026–	Viktoria Plzeň	9	(0)

International career^{‡}
2017–2018	Czech Republic U15	11	(0)
2018–2019	Czech Republic U16	3	(0)
2020	Czech Republic U17	2	(0)
2021	Czech Republic U19	6	(0)
2022	Czech Republic U20	2	(0)
2023–2025	Czech Republic U21	16	(0)
2026–	Czech Republic	1	(0)
- * Club domestic league appearances and goals as of 11:24, 16 June 2026 (UTC) ‡ National team caps and goals as of 15 November 2026

Filip Prebsl (born 4 March 2004) is a Czech professional footballer who plays as a defensive midfielder for Czech First League club FC Viktoria Plzeň and the Czech Republic national team.

== Club career ==
Prebsl started with football in SK Třeboradice on the outskirts of Prague, but already at the age of ten he started playing for SK Slavia Prague. He went through all the youth teams and when he was a member of the under-19 team, he was sent on loan to Viktoria Žižkov, playing in the Czech National Football League, where he made his debut in senior football. After another loan spell in Vlašim, he was sent on loan to Slovan Liberec in February 2022.

Due to injury, he only made his senior league debut for Slovan Liberec on 31 July 2022 in their Czech First League 2–1 away win against Sparta Prague. During two seasons on loan in Slovan Liberec, he developed into one of the mainstays of the team. He played 52 league games and scored three goals. In July 2024, it was announced that Prebsl was returning to Slavia and had extended his contract until 2028.

On 8 February 2025, Prebsl moved to Polish club Górnik Zabrze on loan for the remainder of the season. However, he appeared only in six league matches. Before the 2025–26 season, Prebsl was sent on loan to Mladá Boleslav. Following another loan to Karviná he moved permanently to Viktoria Plzeň in the summer.

== International career ==
Prebsl played for the Czech U17, U19 and U20 teams. In 2023–2025, he played for the U21 team. During the 2025 UEFA Euro Under-21 qualifying campaign, he played almost all of the matches in the starting line-up, helping the team to qualify for the tournament. Although he plays mostly as a defensive midfielder at club level, he was used as a defender in the national team.

== Career statistics ==
=== International ===
As of match played 15 November 2026

Appearances and goals by national team and year
National team	Year	Apps	Goals
Czech Republic	2026	1	0
Total		1	0

== Honours ==
Karviná

- Czech Cup: 2025–26
