= Letná Stadion (Zlín) =

Football stadium in Zlín, Czechia

Letná Stadium
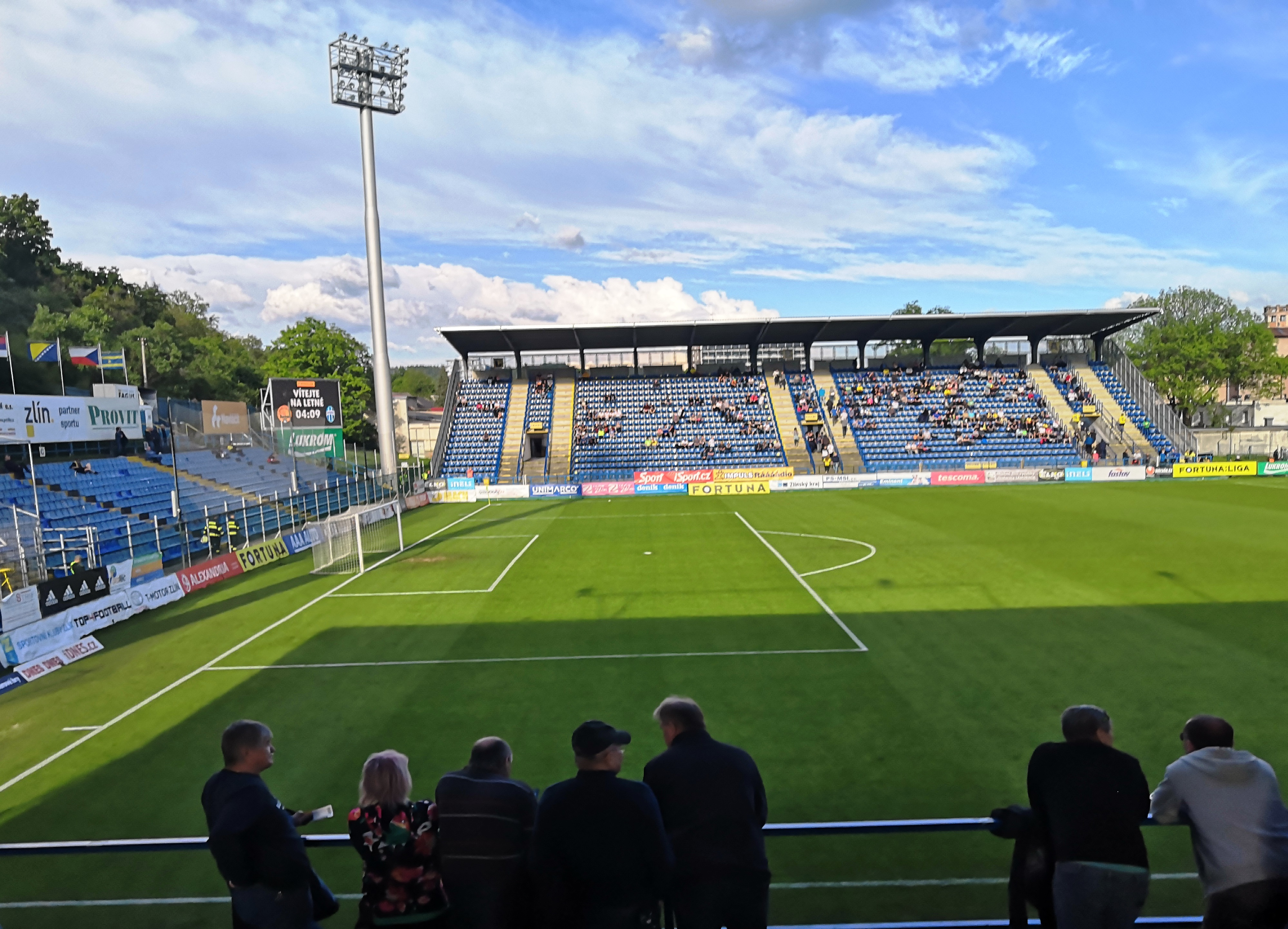
- Interactive map of Letná Stadium
- Location: Tyršovo nábřeží 4381, Zlín, Czech Republic, 760 01
- Coordinates: 49°13′53″N 17°40′10″E
- Capacity: 5,898
- Field size: 105m x 68m

Construction
- Opened: 1953
- Renovated: 1983
- Expanded: 2003–2009

Tenant
- FC Zlín

Letná Stadion is a football stadium in Zlín, Czech Republic. It is currently used as the home ground of FC Zlín and has an all-seated capacity of 5,898. It is located near the Dřevnice river.
