= Luboš Kozel =

Czech footballer and manager

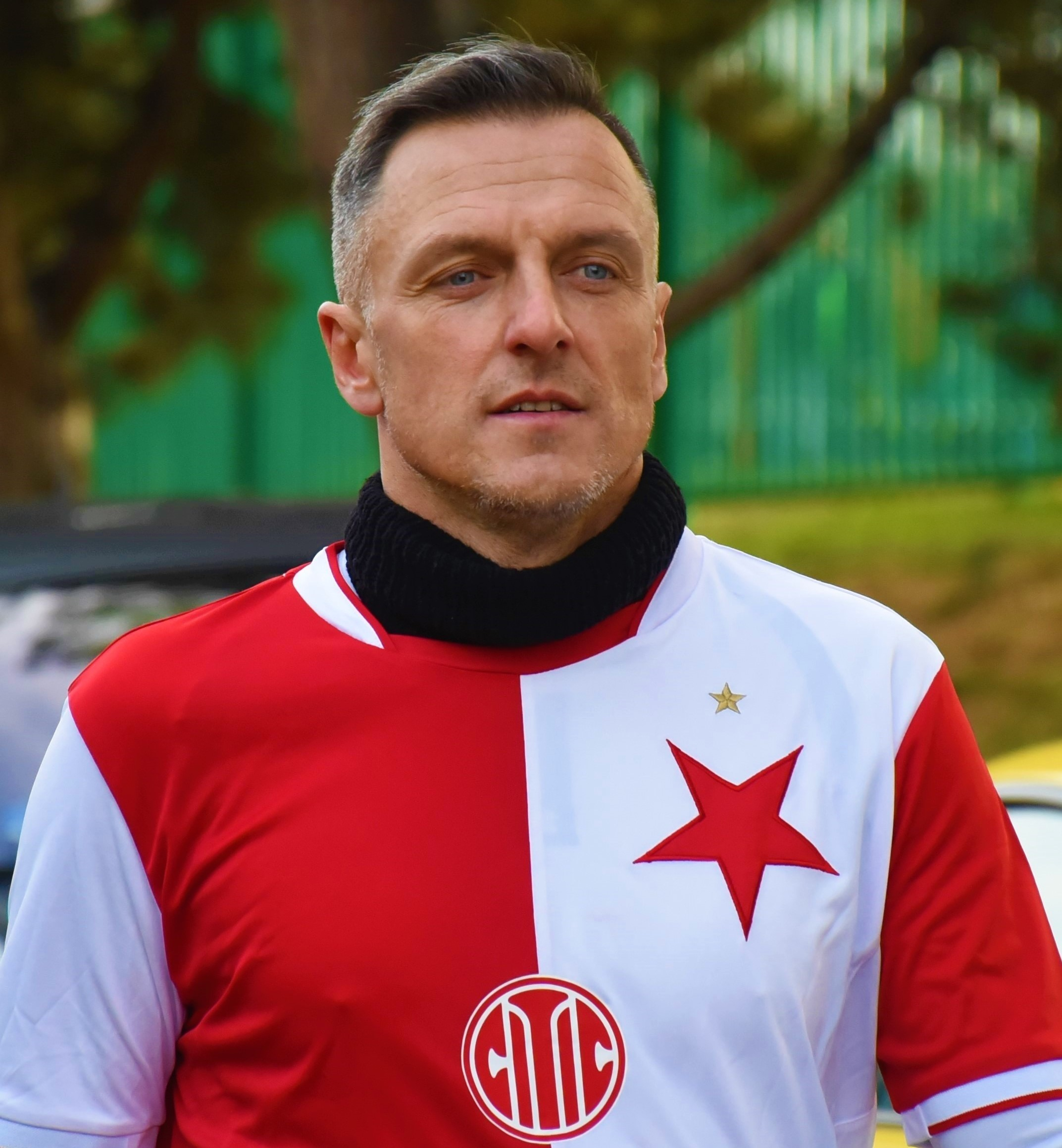
- Kozel in 2019

Personal information
- Date of birth: 16 March 1971 (age 55)
- Place of birth: Vlašim, Czechoslovakia
- Height: 1.83 m (6 ft 0 in)
- Position: Defender

Team information
- Current team: Jablonec (manager)

Youth career
- 1978–1985: Jawa Divišov
- 1986–1989: BS Vlašim
- 1989–1991: ČSAD Benešov

Senior career*
Years	Team	Apps	(Gls)
1991–1993	Švarc Benešov		
1993–2001	Slavia Prague	142	(10)
2002	Újpest	24	(2)
2003	Bohemians Prague	9	(0)
2003	Viktoria Plzeň	9	(1)

International career
1995–1998	Czech Republic	9	(1)

Managerial career
- 2004–2005: Slavia Prague B (assistant)
- 2005–2007: Slavia Prague B
- 2007: Jablonec
- 2007–2009: Slovan Liberec (assistant)
- 2009–2016: Dukla Prague
- 2016–2017: Czech Republic U18
- 2017–2018: Czech Republic U19
- 2018–2019: Czech Republic U18
- 2019–2020: Czech Republic U19
- 2019–2021: Baník Ostrava
- 2021–2024: Slovan Liberec
- 2024–: Jablonec
- * Club domestic league appearances and goals

Luboš Kozel (born 16 March 1971) is a Czech professional football manager and former player who is currently in charge of Jablonec. Following a playing career where he was mostly associated with Slavia Prague, he spent seven years as manager of Dukla Prague, overseeing their transition from the second-tier to the Czech First League. Kozel played for the Czech Republic national team, appearing in nine matches and scoring one goal.

== Playing career ==
Kozel played the majority of his club football at Slavia Prague, playing nine seasons of the Czech First League there. He went on to play for Bohemians Prague and Viktoria Plzeň in the top flight, amassing a total of 160 appearances in the league. He also played for Hungarian Újpest. Kozel represented his country at the 1997 FIFA Confederations Cup.

== Managerial career ==
In 2004, Kozel started work as assistant coach at the "B" team of Slavia Prague. He later took charge of Slavia "B" as the head coach.

Kozel signed a two-year contract with Jablonec in June 2007. This was his first Czech First League management position. Having won just one match in the opening nine games of the season, coupled with his club's exit from the 2007–08 UEFA Cup in the second qualifying round, Kozel become the fourth manager to lose his job in the 2007–08 Czech First League. However, one week later, he was appointed as assistant to Ladislav Škorpil at Liberec.

Kozel was appointed manager of Dukla Prague in December 2009, taking over from Günter Bittengel. In the 2010–11 Czech 2. Liga, Kozel led Dukla to the title and subsequent promotion to the Czech First League. After leading Dukla to consecutive sixth-placed league finishes in 2011–12 and 2012–13, Kozel's contract was extended for a further three years. In 2016 Kozel left Dukla following the expiry of his contract. His replacement was named as Jaroslav Šilhavý. In 2016, he became the coach of the Czech national under-19 team.

== Honours ==
=== Player ===
Slavia Prague

- Czech First League: 1995–96

=== Manager ===
Dukla Prague

- Czech National Football League: 2010–11
