= Jan Mikula =

Czech footballer (born 1992)

Personal information
- Date of birth: 5 January 1992 (age 34)
- Place of birth: Havlíčkův Brod, Czechoslovakia
- Height: 1.83 m (6 ft 0 in)
- Position: Right back

Team information
- Current team: Slovan Liberec
- Number: 3

Youth career
- Ledeč nad Sázavou
- Jihlava
- Havlíčkův Brod
- 2007–2010: Slavia Prague

Senior career*
Years	Team	Apps	(Gls)
2010–2017	Slavia Prague	51	(1)
2013–2014	→ Jihlava (loan)	13	(0)
2017	→ Slovan Liberec (loan)	13	(2)
2017–	Slovan Liberec	230	(7)

International career
2007–2008	Czech Republic U16	5	(1)
2008	Czech Republic U17	5	(2)
2009–2010	Czech Republic U18	5	(0)
2013	Czech Republic U21	1	(0)
- * Club domestic league appearances and goals as of 27 May 2026

Jan Mikula (born 5 January 1992) is a Czech professional footballer who plays as a defender for Slovan Liberec.

He made his career league debut for FC Vysočina Jihlava on 19 October 2013 in a 0–0 away draw at Bohemians 1905. He scored his first career league goal for SK Slavia Prague on 2 August 2015 in a 2–2 home draw against FC Slovan Liberec.
