= Michal Fukala =

Czech association football player

Personal information
- Date of birth: 22 October 2000 (age 26)
- Place of birth: Frýdek-Místek, Czech Republic
- Height: 1.80 m (5 ft 11 in)
- Position: Defender

Team information
- Current team: Zlín
- Number: 22

Senior career*
Years	Team	Apps	(Gls)
2017–2018	Frýdek-Místek	16	(0)
2018–2024	Slovan Liberec	116	(1)
2024–2025	Baník Ostrava	4	(0)
2024–2025	→→ Baník Ostrava B	15	(1)
2025–	Zlín	25	(0)

International career
2018	Czech Republic U18	3	(0)
2018–2019	Czech Republic U19	13	(1)
2019	Czech Republic U20	3	(0)
2021–2023	Czech Republic U21	12	(0)
- * Club domestic league appearances and goals as of 27 May 2026

Michal Fukala (born 22 October 2000) is a Czech footballer who plays as a defender for Zlín.
