= Michael Rabušic =

Czech footballer

Personal information
- Full name: Michael Rabušic
- Date of birth: 17 September 1989 (age 37)
- Place of birth: Náměšť nad Oslavou, Czechoslovakia
- Height: 1.85 m (6 ft 1 in)
- Position: Forward

Youth career
- 1996–2003: FC Náměšť nad Oslavou
- 1998: → HNK Daruvar (loan)
- 2003–2006: Vysočina Jihlava

Senior career*
Years	Team	Apps	(Gls)
2006–2008	Vysočina Jihlava	54	(7)
2009–2011	Brno	61	(10)
2011–2014	Slovan Liberec	69	(23)
2014–2016	Hellas Verona	4	(0)
2014–2015	→ Perugia (loan)	13	(0)
2015	→ Crotone (loan)	7	(0)
2015–2016	→ Slovan Liberec (loan)	19	(1)
2016–2018	Vysočina Jihlava	31	(2)
2018–2019	Szombathelyi Haladás	23	(3)
2019–2020	České Budějovice	6	(2)
2020–2025	Slovan Liberec	112	(20)

International career
2009–2011	Czech Republic U21	8	(4)
2013–2020	Czech Republic	4	(0)
- * Club domestic league appearances and goals as of 17 June 2025

Michael Rabušic (born 17 September 1989) is a Czech retired footballer who last played for Slovan Liberec in the Czech First League.

== Club career ==
=== FC Slovan Liberec ===
In June 2011, Rabušic together with his Zbrojovka Brno teammate Josef Šural signed a three-year contract with Czech First League side Slovan Liberec. He remained at Liberec for three years, having been the top scorer of the club in the first half of the 2013–14 season with four goals.

=== Hellas Verona ===
Rabušic subsequently joined Italian club Hellas Verona on 31 January 2014, the club managing to register him before the midnight league deadline. Having appeared in only four league matches, he went on loan to Perugia the same year in August/ He was loaned to second league side F.C. Crotone. Rabušic went on loan to Czech First League club Slovan Liberec in July 2015.

=== Szombathelyi Haladás ===
Rabušic joined Hungarian club Szombathelyi Haladás on 15 February 2018, managed by former Vysočina Jihlava coach Michal Hipp.

== International career ==
On 14 August 2013, Rabušic debuted for the Czech senior squad in a 1–1 friendly draw against Hungary friendly match in Budapest against home team Hungary.

== Honors ==
Czech Republic U21: UEFA European Under-21 Championship bronze: 2011
