= Ľubomír Tupta =

Slovak footballer (born 1998)

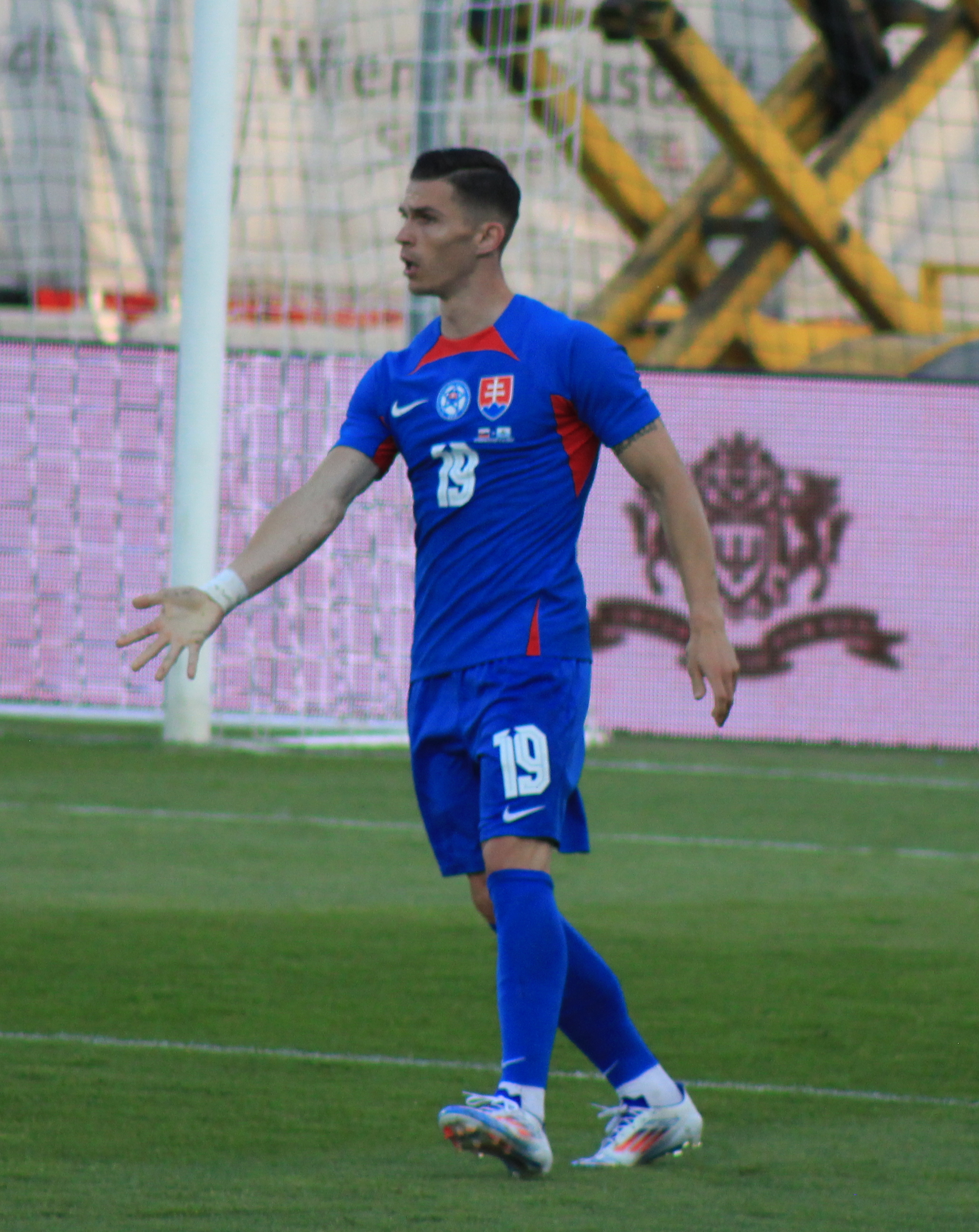
- Tupta in 2024 with Slovakia

Personal information
- Date of birth: 27 March 1998 (age 28)
- Place of birth: Prešov, Slovakia
- Height: 1.82 m (6 ft 0 in)
- Position: Forward

Team information
- Current team: Neftçi
- Number: 29

Youth career
- 2009–2011: Slovan Sabinov
- 2011–2014: Tatran Prešov
- 2014–2015: Catania
- 2015–2018: Hellas Verona

Senior career*
Years	Team	Apps	(Gls)
2017–2022	Hellas Verona	23	(2)
2020	→ Wisła Kraków (loan)	10	(1)
2020–2021	→ Ascoli (loan)	12	(0)
2021	→ Sion (loan)	12	(0)
2021–2022	→ Slovan Liberec (loan)	24	(4)
2022–2023	Pescara	15	(0)
2023	→ Slovan Liberec (loan)	17	(6)
2023–2025	Slovan Liberec	53	(9)
2025	→ Widzew Łódź (loan)	12	(1)
2025–2026	AEL	35	(8)
2026–	Neftçi	5	(1)

International career^{‡}
2014–2015	Slovakia U17	6	(3)
2015–2016	Slovakia U18	6	(1)
2016–2017	Slovakia U19	9	(4)
2018–2020	Slovakia U21	12	(5)
2023–	Slovakia	21	(0)
- * Club domestic league appearances and goals as of 10:26, 17 September 2026 (UTC) ‡ National team caps and goals as of 22:46, 31 March 2026 (UTC)

Ľubomír Tupta (born 27 March 1998) is a Slovak professional footballer who plays as a forward for Azerbaijan Premier League club Neftçi and the Slovakia national team.

== Club career ==
Tupta made his professional debut for Hellas Verona in a 4–0 Serie A loss to Udinese on 23 December 2017.

In January 2020, he agreed a contract extension until 2023 and joined Wisła Kraków on loan.

On 5 October 2020, he joined Serie B club Ascoli on loan.

In February 2021, Tupta's loan in Ascoli ended abruptly after a series of transfers that would have left him sidelined. He was immediately loaned out to Swiss Super League club FC Sion on a half-season loan per wishes of the Sion manager Fabio Grosso.

On 1 September 2022, Tupta signed with Pescara. On 2 February 2023, he returned to Slovan Liberec on loan with an option to buy.

On 22 February 2025, Tupta joined Polish club Widzew Łódź on a half-year loan deal with an option to make the transfer permanent.

On 17 July 2025, Tupta signed a three-year contract with Greek club AEL.

On 26 June 2026, Tupta moved to Azerbaijan Premier League side Neftçi on a two-year deal with an option for a third.

== International career ==
Tupta was first recognised in a senior national team nomination when coach Pavel Hapal named him as an alternate forward for a UEFA Euro 2020 qualifying double fixture in March 2019 against Hungary and Wales.

On 7 June 2024, he appeared in the list of 26 Slovak players selected by Francesco Calzona to participate in UEFA Euro 2024.

== Career statistics ==
=== International ===
As of match played 31 March 2026

Appearances and goals by national team and year
National team	Year	Apps	Goals
Slovakia
Slovakia	2023	2	0
Slovakia	2024	9	0
Slovakia	2025	8	0
Slovakia	2026	2	0
Total		21	0
