= Marios Pourzitidis =

Greek footballer

Personal information
- Date of birth: 8 May 1999 (age 27)
- Place of birth: Thessaloniki, Greece
- Height: 1.90 m (6 ft 3 in)
- Position: Centre-back

Team information
- Current team: Dinamo Tbilisi
- Number: 13

Youth career
- 2002–2015: Bebides 2000
- 2015–2016: Aris
- 2016–2017: Bebides 2000
- 2017–2018: Makedonikos Litis
- 2018–2019: Platanias

Senior career*
Years	Team	Apps	(Gls)
2019–2020	Platanias	31	(0)
2020–2025	Slovan Liberec	105	(4)
2025	→ Dukla Prague (loan)	12	(0)
2025–2026	Dukla Prague	25	(1)
2026–	Dinamo Tbilisi	11	(1)
- * Club domestic league appearances and goals as of 15 November 2026

Marios Pourzitidis (Greek: Μάριος Πουρζιτίδης; born 8 May 1999) is a Greek professional footballer who plays as a centre-back for Erovnuli Liga club Dinamo Tbilisi.

== Career ==
On 28 October 2020, Pourzitidis, who played last year at Platanias, will continue his career at Czech club Slovan Liberec, signing a three-years' contract for an undisclosed fee.

On 28 January 2025, Pourzitidis joined Dukla Prague on a half-year loan deal.

On 24 June 2025, Pourzitidis signed a one-year contract with Dukla Prague as a free agent.

On 26 August 2026, Erovnuli Liga club Dinamo Tbilisi announced the signing of Pourzitidis, on a contract until the end of 2028.
