= Christian Frýdek =

Czech footballer

Personal information
- Date of birth: 1 February 1999 (age 27)
- Place of birth: Leverkusen, Germany
- Height: 1.71 m (5 ft 7 in)
- Position: Attacking midfielder

Team information
- Current team: Garudayaksa
- Number: 11

Youth career
- 2006–2016: Sparta Prague

Senior career*
Years	Team	Apps	(Gls)
2016–2021	Sparta Prague	1	(0)
2018	→ Vlašim (loan)	8	(0)
2018–2019	→ Táborsko (loan)	25	(3)
2019–2020	→ Hradec Králové (loan)	22	(3)
2021–2025	Slovan Liberec	94	(12)
2025–2026	Baník Ostrava	14	(0)
2026	→ Garudayaksa (loan)	10	(4)
2026–	Garudayaksa	7	(0)

International career
2014–2015	Czech Republic U16	6	(0)
2015–2016	Czech Republic U17	3	(1)
2016–2017	Czech Republic U18	5	(4)
2017–2018	Czech Republic U19	6	(0)
2018–2019	Czech Republic U20	2	(0)
- * Club domestic league appearances and goals as of 7 November 2026

Christian Frýdek (born 1 February 1999) is a Czech professional footballer who plays as an attacking midfielder for Super League club Garudayaksa.

== Career ==
He made his senior league debut for Sparta Prague on 20 November 2016 in a Czech First League 3–0 home win against Karviná.

On 28 May 2025, Frýdek signed a three-years contract with Baník Ostrava.

On 30 January 2026, Indonesian club Garudayaksa announced the signing of Frýdek.

On 17 September 2026, Frýdek signed a contract with Indonesian club Garudayaksa as a free agent.

== Personal life ==
He is the son of former Czech international Martin Frýdek, along with his brother Martin, who is also a footballer.

== Honours ==
Garudayaksa

- Championship: 2025–26
