= List of Czech football transfers winter 2025–26 =

This is a list of Czech football transfers for the 2025–26 winter transfer window. Only transfers featuring Chance Liga are listed.

== Chance Liga ==
Note: Flags indicate national team as has been defined under FIFA eligibility rules. Players may hold more than one non-FIFA nationality.

=== Bohemians ===
In:

No.	Pos.	Nation	Player
24	DF	CZE	Milan Havel (from Viktoria Plzeň)
27	DF	CZE	David Lischka (from Baník Ostrava)
32	DF	CZE	Petr Mirvald (from Prostějov)
99	MF	GAM	Gibril Sosseh (on loan from Slavia Prague)
—	DF	ZAM	Mathews Banda (from (Zambia) Kafue Celtic, previously on loan at (Zambia) Nkana)

Out:

No.	Pos.	Nation	Player
7	DF	CZE	Matěj Hybš (to Mladá Boleslav)
11	FW	VEN	Eric Ramírez (loan return to (Ukraine) Dynamo Kyiv)
27	DF	CZE	Adam Kadlec (to Viktoria Plzeň)
41	MF	NGA	Nelson Okeke (loan return to Sparta Prague B)
70	MF	CZE	Šimon Černý (on loan to Příbram)
99	DF	EST	Vlasiy Sinyavskiy (to Baník Ostrava)

=== Hradec Králové ===
In:

No.	Pos.	Nation	Player
3	DF	CZE	Martin Suchomel (on loan from Sparta Prague)
8	DF	CZE	Viktor Zentrich (free agent)
18	FW	LVA	Marko Regža (from (Latvia) Riga)
19	MF	ANG	Elione Fernandes Neto (from (Austria) Red Bull Salzburg, previously on loan at (Austria) Liefering)
27	MF	CZE	Daniel Trubač (from Teplice)

Out:

No.	Pos.	Nation	Player
8	MF	CZE	Alexandr Sojka (to Viktoria Plzeň)
19	MF	CZE	Tom Slončík (loan return to Viktoria Plzeň)
22	MF	CZE	Petr Kodeš (to Teplice)
34	DF	CZE	Jakub Elbel (loan return to Sigma Olomouc)
38	FW	SVK	Adam Griger (on loan to (Slovakia) Slovan Bratislava)
—	FW	CZE	Filip Firbacher (on loan to (Slovakia) Považská Bystrica, previously on loan at České Budějovice)
—	DF	CZE	David Heidenreich (free agent, previously on loan at (Slovakia) Tatran Prešov)

=== Jablonec ===
In:

No.	Pos.	Nation	Player
6	MF	NGA	Nelson Okeke (from Sparta Prague B, previously on loan at Bohemians)
9	MF	SVK	Dominik Hollý (on loan from Sparta Prague)
23	DF	UKR	Eduard Sobol (from (France) Strasbourg)
27	FW	GAM	Ebrima Singhateh (from Karviná)

Out:

No.	Pos.	Nation	Player
9	MF	CZE	Lukáš Penxa (loan return to Sparta Prague B)
10	MF	CZE	Jan Suchan (on loan to Slovácko)
16	FW	CZE	Antonín Růsek (loan return to Sigma Olomouc)

=== Karviná ===
In:

No.	Pos.	Nation	Player
12	FW	NOR	Josias King Furaha (from (Norway) Jerv)
19	DF	SVN	Nino Milić (from (Slovenia) Domžale)
21	DF	CZE	Šimon Slončík (on loan from Slavia Prague B)
44	DF	UKR	Yevheniy Skyba (from (Ukraine) Chornomorets Odesa)
93	FW	BFA	Faycal Konaté (from (Latvia) RFS)
99	DF	CZE	Filip Prebsl (from Slavia Prague, previously on loan at Mladá Boleslav)

Out:

No.	Pos.	Nation	Player
12	FW	SEN	Abdallah Gning (to Baník Ostrava)
21	MF	CZE	Alexandr Bužek (loan return to Slavia Prague)
27	FW	GAM	Ebrima Singhateh (to Jablonec)
37	DF	SVK	Dávid Krčík (to Viktoria Plzeň)

=== Slovan Liberec ===
In:

No.	Pos.	Nation	Player
14	DF	TOG	Augustin Drakpe (from (Netherlands) Dordrecht)
23	DF	BIH	Haris Berbić (from (Bosnia and Herzegovina) Borac Banja Luka)
28	MF	CZE	Vojtěch Sychra (from Pardubice)
—	GK	SVK	Dominik Kúdelčík (from Vlašim)

Out:

No.	Pos.	Nation	Player
2	DF	CZE	Dominik Plechatý (to Artis Brno)
19	MF	CZE	Michal Hlavatý (to Pardubice)
31	GK	CZE	Hugo Jan Bačkovský (to Dukla Prague)
—	DF	CZE	Dominik Mašek (on loan to (Slovakia) Ružomberok, previously on loan at Pardubice)

=== Mladá Boleslav ===
In:

No.	Pos.	Nation	Player
4	DF	CZE	Adam Zouhar (from Sparta Prague B, previously on loan)
5	DF	CZE	Jan Harušťák (on loan from Baník Ostrava)
11	DF	CZE	Matěj Hybš (from Bohemians)
25	FW	CZE	Christophe Kabongo (on loan from Viktoria Plzeň)
42	GK	CZE	Vojtěch Vorel (on loan from Sparta Prague)
44	DF	CZE	Ondřej Karafiát (from (Germany) 1. FC Nürnberg)
90	MF	NGA	Victor Ogungbayi (from Slavia Prague B)

Out:

No.	Pos.	Nation	Player
6	MF	CZE	Vojtěch Hora (on loan to Příbram)
9	FW	CZE	Matyáš Vojta (to Sparta Prague)
11	MF	CZE	Jakub Fulnek (to Artis Brno)
16	DF	KOS	Jetmir Haliti (free agent)
26	DF	CZE	Matěj Zachoval (on loan to Chrudim)
27	GK	CZE	Aleš Mandous (loan return to Slavia Prague)
38	DF	CZE	Filip Prebsl (loan return to Slavia Prague)

=== Sigma Olomouc ===
In:

No.	Pos.	Nation	Player
3	DF	SUI	Louis Lurvink (from Pardubice)
7	FW	SVN	Danijel Šturm (from (Slovenia) Celje)
10	FW	CZE	Václav Sejk (from (Netherlands) Heerenveen)
18	FW	UGA	John Paul Dembe (from (Sweden) Häcken)
19	MF	POL	Jakub Jezierski (from (Poland) Śląsk Wrocław)
20	MF	SRB	Dario Grgić (from (Serbia) Železničar Pančevo)
23	MF	CRO	Fabijan Krivak (from (Croatia) Lokomotiva Zagreb)
88	MF	HUN	Péter Baráth (from (Poland) Raków Częstochowa)

Out:

No.	Pos.	Nation	Player
3	DF	CZE	Adam Dohnálek (on loan to Prostějov)
5	DF	SVK	Tomáš Huk (on loan to Slovácko)
7	MF	CZE	Radim Breite (to Artis Brno)
10	MF	MKD	Tihomir Kostadinov (on loan to Slovácko)
15	FW	CZE	Daniel Vašulín (loan return to Viktoria Plzeň)
17	FW	CZE	Denis Kramář (on loan to Prostějov)
19	DF	CZE	Lukáš Vraštil (retired)
23	DF	ROU	Andres Dumitrescu (loan return to Slavia Prague)
26	FW	NGA	Muhamed Tijani (loan return to Slavia Prague)
30	MF	CZE	Jan Navrátil (to Artis Brno)
31	GK	CZE	Jakub Trefil (on loan to (Denmark) Kolding)
37	MF	CZE	Štěpán Langer (to Zbrojovka Brno)
75	MF	CMR	Simion Michez (loan return to Slavia Prague)
80	MF	CZE	Václav Zahradníček (on loan to Prostějov)

=== Baník Ostrava ===
In:

No.	Pos.	Nation	Player
3	DF	SEN	Hamidou Kante (on loan from Slavia Prague)
12	FW	SEN	Abdallah Gning (from Karviná)
15	FW	CZE	Václav Jurečka (from (Turkey) Çaykur Rizespor)
19	MF	CZE	Filip Šancl (from Slavia Prague, previously on loan at Pardubice)
20	DF	COL	Pablo Ortiz (from (Slovakia) Dunajská Streda, previously on loan at (United States) Houston Dynamo)
23	GK	CZE	Martin Jedlička (on loan from Viktoria Plzeň)
26	MF	FIN	Lauri Laine (from (Finland) SJK)
99	DF	EST	Vlasiy Sinyavskiy (from Bohemians)
—	DF	CZE	Jan Harušťák (from Prostějov)

Out:

No.	Pos.	Nation	Player
4	MF	CIV	Christ Tiéhi (loan return to (Hungary) Diósgyőr)
8	MF	CZE	Christian Frýdek (to (Indonesia) Garudayaksa)
19	DF	CZE	David Lischka (to Bohemians)
22	FW	CZE	Tomáš Zlatohlávek (to Teplice)
31	DF	DEN	Alexander Munksgaard (to (Norway) Kristiansund)
99	DF	GRE	Georgios Kornezos (to (Greece) Levadiakos)
—	DF	CZE	Jan Harušťák (on loan to Mladá Boleslav)

=== Pardubice ===
In:

No.	Pos.	Nation	Player
5	DF	CZE	Jiří Hamza (from Slovácko)
15	DF	NGA	Emmanuel Godwin (from (Sweden) Trelleborg)
16	MF	CZE	Tomáš Jelínek (on loan from Slavia Prague B)
19	MF	CZE	Michal Hlavatý (from Slovan Liberec)
30	GK	CZE	Aleš Mandous (from Slavia Prague, previously on loan at Mladá Boleslav)
39	DF	SVK	Samuel Kopásek (from (Slovakia) Žilina)
40	DF	CZE	Tobias Boledovič (from Slavia Prague B)
92	DF	UKR	Bohdan Slyubyk (from (Ukraine) Rukh Lviv)
—	MF	BFA	Arouna Ouattara (from (Georgia (country)) Dila Gori)

Out:

No.	Pos.	Nation	Player
1	GK	CZE	Jáchym Šerák (on loan to Chrudim)
3	DF	SUI	Louis Lurvink (to Sigma Olomouc)
14	MF	LBR	Divine Teah (loan return to Slavia Prague)
15	MF	CZE	Denis Darmovzal (to Opava)
16	MF	CZE	Filip Šancl (loan return to Slavia Prague)
19	DF	CZE	Dominik Mašek (loan return to Slovan Liberec)
27	MF	CZE	Vojtěch Sychra (to Slovan Liberec)
31	MF	CZE	Milan Lexa (loan return to Slovan Liberec)
39	FW	CZE	Denis Alijagić (loan return to (Slovakia) Žilina)
—	MF	BFA	Arouna Ouattara (on loan to Vlašim)
—	MF	CIV	Laurent Kissiedou (to (United States) Charleston Battery, previously on loan at Příbram)

=== Viktoria Plzeň ===
In:

No.	Pos.	Nation	Player
1	GK	SVK	Dominik Ťapaj (from (Slovakia) Ružomberok)
10	FW	GUI	Mohamed Toure (from (Finland) KuPS)
12	MF	CZE	Alexandr Sojka (from Hradec Králové)
16	DF	CZE	Adam Kadlec (from Bohemians)
17	MF	SVK	Patrik Hrošovský (from (Belgium) Genk)
37	DF	SVK	Dávid Krčík (from Karviná)
70	FW	NGA	Salim Fago Lawal (from (Croatia) Istra 1961)

Out:

No.	Pos.	Nation	Player
2	DF	CZE	Lukáš Hejda (to Křimice)
3	DF	SRB	Svetozar Marković (to (Slovakia) Slovan Bratislava)
7	FW	CZE	Christophe Kabongo (on loan to Mladá Boleslav)
17	FW	NGA	Rafiu Durosinmi (to (Italy) Pisa)
23	GK	CZE	Martin Jedlička (on loan to Baník Ostrava)
24	DF	CZE	Milan Havel (to Bohemians)
85	MF	SVN	Adrian Zeljković (on loan to (Hungary) MTK Budapest)

=== Dukla Prague ===
In:

No.	Pos.	Nation	Player
6	MF	CZE	Lukáš Penxa (on loan from Sparta Prague B, previously on loan at Jablonec)
11	FW	CMR	Kevin-Prince Milla (on loan from Sparta Prague)
15	MF	TRI	Dantaye Gilbert (from (Hungary) Nyíregyháza)
17	FW	CZE	Tomáš Pekhart (free agent)
21	MF	SWE	Seif Ali Hindi (from (Sweden) Falkenberg)
25	MF	CZE	Marek Hanousek (from (Poland) Widzew Łódź)
28	DF	CRO	Bruno Unušić (free agent)
47	MF	AUT	Dario Kreiker (free agent)
59	GK	CZE	Hugo Jan Bačkovský (from Slovan Liberec)

Out:

No.	Pos.	Nation	Player
2	DF	NGA	Samuel Isife (to Slavia Prague)
6	DF	CZE	Roman Holiš (to Silon Táborsko)
7	MF	CZE	Jan Peterka (to Ústí nad Labem)
12	MF	CZE	Martin Ambler (on loan to Viktoria Žižkov)
15	MF	CZE	Štěpán Šebrle (on loan to Viktoria Žižkov)
16	FW	CZE	Tomáš Jedlička (on loan to Příbram)
17	FW	FRA	Jacques Fokam (on loan to (Albania) Bylis)
—	DF	CZE	Ondřej Ullman (to Ústí nad Labem, previously on loan at (Latvia) FS Jelgava)

=== Slavia Prague ===
In:

No.	Pos.	Nation	Player
14	DF	NGA	Samuel Isife (from Dukla Prague)
39	DF	CZE	David Jurásek (from (Portugal) Benfica, previously on loan at (Turkey) Beşiktaş)
—	DF	SEN	Hamidou Kante (from Artis Brno)
—	MF	GAM	Gibril Sosseh (from (Sweden) Kalmar)
—	FW	CIV	Adonija Ouanda (from (Serbia) Voždovac)

Out:

No.	Pos.	Nation	Player
8	DF	JPN	Daiki Hashioka (on loan to (Belgium) Gent)
10	MF	GRE	Christos Zafeiris (loan return to (Greece) PAOK)
22	MF	CZE	Lukáš Vorlický (on loan to Zbrojovka Brno)
33	DF	CZE	Ondřej Zmrzlý (on loan to (Poland) Górnik Zabrze)
—	DF	SEN	Hamidou Kante (on loan to Baník Ostrava)
—	MF	GAM	Gibril Sosseh (on loan to Bohemians)
—	FW	CIV	Adonija Ouanda (on loan to Slovácko)
—	FW	NGA	Muhamed Tijani (on loan to (Hungary) Nyíregyháza, previously on loan at Sigma Olomouc)
—	GK	CZE	Aleš Mandous (to Pardubice, previously on loan at Mladá Boleslav)
—	DF	CZE	Filip Prebsl (to Karviná, previously on loan at Mladá Boleslav)
—	DF	ROU	Andres Dumitrescu (to (Romania) Petrolul Ploiești, previously on loan at Sigma Olomouc)
—	MF	NOR	Conrad Wallem (to (United States) St. Louis City, previously on loan)
—	MF	CZE	Filip Šancl (to Baník Ostrava, previously on loan at Pardubice)

=== Sparta Prague ===
In:

No.	Pos.	Nation	Player
14	DF	ECU	Jhoanner Chávez (on loan from (France) Lens)
17	DF	PER	Oliver Sonne (on loan from (England) Burnley)
18	MF	SCO	Andy Irving (from (England) West Ham United)
21	MF	PER	Joao Grimaldo (from (Serbia) Patrizan, previously on loan at (Latvia) Riga)
29	FW	CZE	Matyáš Vojta (from Mladá Boleslav)

Out:

No.	Pos.	Nation	Player
2	DF	CZE	Martin Suchomel (on loan to Hradec Králové)
14	FW	SRB	Veljko Birmančević (on loan to (Spain) Getafe)
17	DF	ECU	Ángelo Preciado (to (Brazil) Atlético Mineiro)
18	MF	CZE	Lukáš Sadílek (to (Poland) Górnik Zabrze)
21	MF	SVK	Dominik Hollý (on loan to Jablonec)
28	FW	CMR	Kevin-Prince Milla (on loan to Dukla Prague)
—	GK	CZE	Vojtěch Vorel (on loan to Mladá Boleslav)
—	FW	CZE	Václav Sejk (to (Netherlands) Heerenveen, previously on loan)

=== Slovácko ===
In:

No.	Pos.	Nation	Player
16	MF	SVK	Adrián Fiala (on loan from (Slovakia) Trenčín)
17	MF	CZE	Jan Suchan (on loan from Jablonec)
22	DF	SVK	Tomáš Huk (on loan from Sigma Olomouc)
26	MF	MKD	Tihomir Kostadinov (on loan from Sigma Olomouc)
27	FW	CAN	Adonija Ouanda (on loan from Slavia Prague)
72	MF	CZE	Roman Horák (on loan from Sparta Prague B)

Out:

No.	Pos.	Nation	Player
25	DF	CZE	Jiří Hamza (to Pardubice)
27	FW	AUT	Marko Kvasina (to (Hungary) Nyíregyháza)
31	GK	CZE	Jiří Borek (to Artis Brno)
77	MF	KOR	Kim Seung-bin (to (South Korea) Bucheon)

=== Teplice ===
In:

No.	Pos.	Nation	Player
7	FW	CZE	Tomáš Zlatohlávek (from Baník Ostrava)
16	MF	CZE	Petr Kodeš (from Hradec Králové)
18	DF	LBR	Emmanuel Fully (on loan from Slavia Prague B)
31	GK	CZE	Kryštof Lichtenberg (from Mladá Boleslav B, previously on loan)

Out:

No.	Pos.	Nation	Player
1	GK	CZE	Luděk Němeček (on loan to Sokol Brozany)
4	DF	UKR	Yehor Tsykalo (on loan to (Poland) Stal Mielec)
7	MF	CZE	Marek Beránek (on loan to Chrudim)
18	FW	BIH	Hamza Ljukovac (loan return to (Turkey) İstanbul Başakşehir)
20	MF	CZE	Daniel Trubač (to Hradec Králové)
21	MF	CZE	Jakub Emmer (to Viagem Ústí nad Labem)

=== Zlín ===
In:

No.	Pos.	Nation	Player
5	MF	LVA	Kristers Penkevics (from (Latvia) Jelgava)
10	MF	CZE	Jakub Pešek (from (Poland) Wieczysta Kraków)
25	DF	CZE	Jakub Jugas (from (Poland) Cracovia)

Out:

No.	Pos.	Nation	Player
20	DF	POR	André Lopes (free agent)
27	DF	AUT	Vincent Trummer (retired)

== See also ==
- 2025–26 Czech First League
