= 2025–26 SK Slavia Prague season =

SK Slavia Prague
2025–26 season
- Manager: Jindřich Trpišovský
- Stadium: Fortuna Arena
- Czech First League: Champions
- Czech Cup: Quarterfinal
- Champions League: League phase
- Top goalscorer: League: Tomáš Chorý (17); All: Tomáš Chorý (17)
- Highest home attendance: 19,309 (vs MFK Karviná, 13 September 2025, Czech First League)
- Lowest home attendance: 0 (vs Jablonec, 13 May 2026, Czech First League); 0 (vs Viktoria Plzeň, 24 May 2026, Czech First League)
- Average home league attendance: 16,351
Home colours	Away colours	Third colours

The 2025–26 season is the 133rd season in the history of SK Slavia Prague, and the club's 33rd consecutive season in Czech First League. In addition to the domestic league, the team will participate in the Czech Cup, and the UEFA Champions League.

== Season events ==
On 2 June, Slavia announced the signing of Michal Sadílek to a three-year contract from FC Twente.

On 3 June, Slavia announced the signing of Youssoupha Sanyang to a five-year contract from Östers IF.

On 9 June, Slavia announced the signing of Dominik Javorček to a four-year contract from MŠK Žilina.

On 24 June, Slavia announced that they had signed Tomáš Necid and Marek Suchý to two-year contract to play and act as mentors for Slavia Prague B.

On 26 June, Slavia announced that Lukáš Masopust had left the club to sign permanently for Slovan Liberec, whilst Dan Kohout and Jakub Kratochvíl signed their first professional contracts with Slavia.

On 27 June, Slavia announced the signing of Daiki Hashioka from Luton Town, on a contract until 30 June 2029.

On 30 June, Slavia extended their contract with Christos Zafeiris for an additional year, until the summer of 2028.

On 11 July, Slavia announced that they had signed Simon Deli to three-year contract to play and act as a mentor for Slavia Prague B.

On 15 July, Slavia announced that El Hadji Malick Diouf had left the club to sign for West Ham United for an undisclosed fee.

On 24 July, Slavia announced the permanent signing of Emmanuel Fully from Watanga, after he'd spent the first half of 2025 on loan at Slavia Prague B, on a contract until 30 June 2029.

On 20 August, Slavia announced the signing of Youssoupha Mbodji from Vysočina Jihlava on a contract until 30 June 2030.

On 26 August, Slavia announced that Christos Zafeiris had been sold to PAOK for €12,000,000, but would remain with Slavia until the winter transfer window.

On 30 August, Slavia announced the signing of Muhammed Cham from Trabzonspor on loan for the season, with an option to make the move permanent.

On 2 September, Slavia announced the signing of Erik Prekop from Baník Ostrava on a contract until 30 June 2028.

On 10 September, Slavia announced the signing of Samuel Isife from Dukla Prague on a contract until 31 December 2029, with Isife staying at Dukla Prague on loan until the end of the year.

On 28 November, Slavia announced that they had extended their contract with Šimon Slončík until June 2028.

On 1 December, Slavia announced that they had extended their contract with Samuel Pikolon until June 2029.

On 5 December, Slavia announced the signing of Hamidou Kante from Artis Brno on a contract until 30 June 2030.

On 17 December, Slavia announced that they had extended their contract with Denis Halinský, who is currently on loan at Teplice, until June 2030.

On 5 January, Slavia announced that they had signed Abel Cedergren from Stabæk on a contract until 31 December 2028, with Cedergren joining Slavia Prague B.

On 6 January, Slavia announced that Daniel Toula had left the club to sign for Artis Brno, with a buy-back option.

On 8 January, Slavia announced that Aleš Mandous had left the club to sign for Pardubice permanently, and that Tomas Jelinek and Tobias Boledovič were joining Pardubice on loan, whilst Lukáš Vorlický joined Zbrojovka Brno on loan. Later on the same day, Slavia announced that they had signed professional contracts with Aleksa Ilinčić and Lukáš Soused.

On 12 January, Slavia announced the return of David Jurásek on a three-and-a-half-year contract from Benfica.

On 14 January, Slavia announced the signing of Adonija Ouanda from Voždovac on a contract until 31 December 2030.

On 15 January, Slavia announced that they had extended their contract with Ivan Schranz until 31 December 2027.

On 17 January, Slavia announced the signing of Gibril Sosseh from Kalmar on a contract until 31 December 2030.

On 21 January, Slavia announced that they had extended their contract with Petr Potmesil until 30 June 2029.

On 29 January, Slavia announced that Šimon Slončík and Filip Prebsl had both joined Karviná on loan for the remainder of the season, with Karviná having the option to make Prebsl's move permanent.

On 2 February, Slavia announced that Daiki Hashioka had joined KAA Gent on loan until the end of the season, with an option to make the move permanent.

On 25 February, Slavia announced that Ondřej Zmrzlý had joined Górnik Zabrze on loan until the end of the season, with an option to make the move permanent.

On 9 May, Slavia's home game against rivals Sparta Prague was abandoned in the 97th minute, with Slavia leading 3-2 at the time, after fans invaded the pitch. During the riots on the pitch, Jakub Surovcik appeared to be hit in the face by a flare thrown from at close range, with Slavia chairman Jaroslav Tvrdik stating that the Fortuna Arena's North Stand would remain closed until all perpetrators are brought to justice and that lifetime bans would be imposed on fans who invaded the pitch when the team were minutes from winning the league. On 12 May, the Ligová Fotbalová Asociace sanction Slavia with a 0-3 technical defeat to Sparta, a 10 million crowns fine and the closure of the stadium to fans for the next 4 home matches.

On 29 May, Slavia announced that they had extended their contract with Tomáš Holeš until the summer of 2028, and their contract with Mojmír Chytil until the summer of 2029.

== Squad ==
As of match played 24 May 2026

No.	Name	Nationality	Position	Date of birth (age)	Signed from	Signed in	Contract ends	Apps.	Goals
Goalkeepers
1	Ondřej Kolář	(Czech Republic)	GK	17 October 1994 (age 32)	Slovan Liberec	2018	2027	222	1
35	Jakub Markovič	(Czech Republic)	GK	13 July 2001 (age 25)	Baník Ostrava	2025	2029	26	0
36	Jindřich Staněk	(Czech Republic)	GK	27 April 1996 (age 30)	Viktoria Plzeň	2024	2027	52	0
Defenders
2	Štěpán Chaloupek	(Czech Republic)	DF	8 March 2003 (age 23)	Teplice	2024	2028	60	8
3	Tomáš Holeš	(Czech Republic)	DF	31 March 1993 (age 33)	Jablonec	2019	2028	236	20
4	David Zima	(Czech Republic)	DF	8 November 2000 (age 26)	Torino	2024	2028	138	3
5	Igoh Ogbu	(Nigeria)	DF	8 February 2000 (age 26)	Lillestrøm	2023	2027	113	6
6	Elias Pitak	(Czech Republic)	DF	28 March 2006 (age 20)	Academy	2025		2	0
12	Youssoupha Mbodji	(Senegal)	DF	9 January 2004 (age 22)	Vysočina Jihlava	2025	2030	18	3
14	Samuel Isife	(Nigeria)	DF	13 July 2004 (age 22)	Dukla Prague	2025	2029	14	1
18	Jan Bořil	(Czech Republic)	DF	11 January 1991 (age 35)	Mladá Boleslav	2016	2025	288	17
27	Tomáš Vlček	(Czech Republic)	DF	28 February 2001 (age 25)	Academy	2019		67	1
37	Dominik Javorček	(Slovakia)	DF	2 November 2002 (age 24)	MŠK Žilina	2025	2029	1	0
39	David Jurásek	(Czech Republic)	DF	7 August 2000 (age 26)	Benfica	2026	2029	72	4
	Hamidou Kante	(Senegal)	DF	18 December 2004 (age 21)	Artis Brno	2025	2030	0	0
Midfielders
10	Muhammed Cham	(Austria)	MF	26 September 2000 (age 26)	on loan from Trabzonspor	2025	2026	25	0
16	David Moses	(Nigeria)	MF	20 January 2004 (age 22)	MFK Karviná	2025	2029	50	2
17	Lukáš Provod	(Czech Republic)	MF	23 October 1996 (age 30)	Viktoria Plzeň	2020		224	27
19	Oscar Dorley	(Liberia)	MF	19 July 1998 (age 28)	Slovan Liberec	2019	2027	238	11
20	Alexandr Bužek	(Czech Republic)	MF	2 August 2004 (age 22)	Zlín	2024	2028	9	1
21	David Douděra	(Czech Republic)	MF	31 May 1998 (age 28)	Mladá Boleslav	2022	2028	153	13
23	Michal Sadílek	(Czech Republic)	MF	31 May 1999 (age 27)	FC Twente	2025	2028	39	2
41	Simion Michez	(Cameroon)	MF	9 February 2002 (age 24)	Beerschot	2024	2028	18	1
	Petr Ševčík	(Czech Republic)	MF	2 May 1994 (age 32)	Slovan Liberec	2019		157	11
	Gibril Sosseh	(The Gambia)	MF	1 January 2007 (age 19)	Kalmar	2026	2030	0	0
Forwards
9	Vasil Kušej	(Czech Republic)	FW	24 May 2000 (age 26)	Mladá Boleslav	2025	2028	52	16
11	Youssoupha Sanyang	(The Gambia)	FW	31 August 2005 (age 21)	Östers IF	2025	2030	21	1
13	Mojmír Chytil	(Czech Republic)	FW	29 April 1999 (age 27)	Sigma Olomouc	2023	202	126	47
25	Tomáš Chorý	(Czech Republic)	FW	26 January 1995 (age 31)	Viktoria Plzeň	2024	2027	78	37
26	Ivan Schranz	(Slovakia)	FW	13 September 1993 (age 33)	Jablonec	2021	2027	158	34
31	Erik Prekop	(Slovakia)	FW	8 October 1997 (age 29)	Baník Ostrava	2025	2028	24	1
	Adonija Ouanda	(Ivory Coast)	FW	30 April 2005 (age 21)	Voždovac	2026	2030	0	0
Slavia B
41	Jakub Kolisek	(Czech Republic)	DF	14 August 2007 (age 19)	Academy	2025		3	0
43	Dan Kohout	(Czech Republic)	FW	14 August 2006 (age 20)	Academy	2025		2	1
45	Mubarak Suleiman	(Nigeria)	MF	13 April 2007 (age 19)	Right2Win SA	2025		9	3
45	Adam Rajnoha	(Slovakia)	DF	14 April 2008 (age 18)	MŠK Žilina	2025		1	0
48	Petr Potmesil	(Czech Republic)	FW	19 January 2008 (age 18)	Academy	2025	2029	1	0
	Aleks Bozhev	(Bulgaria)	GK	19 July 2005 (age 21)	CSKA 1948 Sofia	2025	2029	0	0
	Martin Berkovec	(Czech Republic)	GK	12 February 1989 (age 37)	Unattached	2024		49	0
	Aleksa Ilinčić	(Czech Republic)	MF	24 January 2009 (age 17)	Academy	2026		0	0
	Lukáš Soused	(Czech Republic)	MF	28 March 2010 (age 16)	Academy	2026		0	0
	Abel Cedergren	(Norway)	MF	26 June 2009 (age 17)	Stabæk	2026	2028	0	0
	Milan Škoda	(Czech Republic)	FW	16 January 1986 (age 40)	Mladá Boleslav	2023	2025	254	89
Away on loan
8	Daiki Hashioka	(Japan)	DF	17 May 1999 (age 27)	Luton Town	2025	2029	14	0
14	Tomas Jelinek	(Czech Republic)	MF	27 December 2005 (age 20)	Academy	2025		3	1
15	Emmanuel Fully	(Liberia)	DF	20 March 2006 (age 20)	Watanga	2025	2029	5	1
22	Lukáš Vorlický	(Czech Republic)	FW	18 January 2002 (age 24)	Atalanta	2024		15	2
28	Filip Prebsl	(Czech Republic)	DF	4 March 2003 (aged 20)	Academy	2020		19	1
29	Divine Teah	(Liberia)	MF	19 April 2006 (age 20)	Hammarby	2025	2029	12	0
33	Ondřej Zmrzlý	(Czech Republic)	DF	22 April 1999 (age 27)	Sigma Olomouc	2024	2027	52	5
37	Vladimir Perišić	(Montenegro)	FW	26 August 2004 (age 22)	Budućnost Podgorica	2024	2028	0	0
46	Mikuláš Konečný	(Czech Republic)	DF	2 June 2006 (age 20)	Academy	2024		8	1
48	Dominik Pech	(Czech Republic)	MF	9 April 2006 (age 20)	Academy	2023		21	1
	Denis Halinský	(Czech Republic)	DF	13 July 2003 (age 23)	Příbram	2022	2030	0	0
	Šimon Slončík	(Czech Republic)	DF	15 May 2007 (age 19)	Academy	2025	2028	0	0
	Sahmkou Camara	(Guinea)	DF	10 June 2003 (age 23)	Stade Lausanne Ouchy	2025		0	0
	Tobias Boledovic	(Czech Republic)	MF	16 September 2006 (age 20)	Academy	2024		0	0
	Timothy Ouma	(Kenya)	MF	10 June 2004 (age 22)	IF Elfsborg	2025	2029	1	0
	Filip Šancl	(Czech Republic)	FW	23 June 2005 (age 21)	Vysočina Jihlava	2025	2029	0	0
	Muhamed Tijani	(Nigeria)	FW	26 July 2000 (age 26)	Baník Ostrava	2023	2028	33	4
Players who left during the season
8	Lukáš Masopust	(Czech Republic)	MF	12 February 1993 (age 33)	Jablonec	2019		200	24
10	Christos Zafeiris	(Greece)	MF	23 February 2003 (age 23)	on loan from PAOK	2025	2025	123	14
12	El Hadji Malick Diouf	(Senegal)	DF	28 December 2004 (age 21)	Tromsø	2024	2028	50	9
20	Giannis Fivos Botos	(Greece)	MF	20 December 2000 (age 25)	Helmond Sport	2024	2028	15	1
24	Aleš Mandous	(Czech Republic)	GK	21 April 1992 (age 34)	Sigma Olomouc	2021	2026	79	0
29	Michal Tomič	(Slovakia)	DF	30 March 1999 (age 27)	1. Slovácko	2023	2026	32	2
30	Daniel Toula	(Czech Republic)	FW	19 February 2005 (age 21)	Academy	2024		3	0
	Conrad Wallem	(Norway)	MF	9 June 2000 (age 26)	Odd	2023	2027	47	9

== Transfers ==
=== In ===
Date	Position	Nationality	Name	From	Fee	Ref.
2 June 2025	MF	(Czech Republic)	Michal Sadílek	FC Twente	Undisclosed	
3 June 2025	FW	(The Gambia)	Youssoupha Sanyang	Östers IF	Undisclosed	
9 June 2025	DF	(Slovakia)	Dominik Javorček	MŠK Žilina	Undisclosed	
27 June 2025	DF	(Japan)	Daiki Hashioka	Luton Town	Undisclosed	
24 July 2025	DF	(Liberia)	Emmanuel Fully	Watanga	Undisclosed	
20 August 2025	DF	(Senegal)	Youssoupha Mbodji	Vysočina Jihlava	Undisclosed	
2 September 2025	FW	(Slovakia)	Erik Prekop	Baník Ostrava	Undisclosed	
10 September 2025	DF	(Nigeria)	Samuel Isife	Dukla Prague	Undisclosed	
5 December 2025	DF	(Senegal)	Hamidou Kante	Artis Brno	Undisclosed	
5 January 2026	MF	(Norway)	Abel Cedergren	Stabæk	Undisclosed	
12 January 2026	MF	(Czech Republic)	David Jurásek	Benfica	Undisclosed	
14 January 2026	FW	(Ivory Coast)	Adonija Ouanda	Voždovac	Undisclosed	
17 January 2026	MF	(The Gambia)	Gibril Sosseh	Kalmar	Undisclosed	

=== Loans in ===
Date from	Position	Nationality	Name	From	Date to	Ref.
26 August 2025	MF	(Greece)	Christos Zafeiris	PAOK	31 December 2025	
30 August 2025	MF	(Austria)	Muhammed Cham	Trabzonspor	30 June 2026	

=== Out ===
Date	Position	Nationality	Name	To	Fee	Ref.
26 June 2025	MF	(Czech Republic)	Lukáš Masopust	Slovan Liberec	Undisclosed	
15 July 2025	DF	(Senegal)	El Hadji Malick Diouf	West Ham United	Undisclosed	
26 August 2025	MF	(Greece)	Christos Zafeiris	PAOK	€12,000,000	
8 September 2025	MF	(Greece)	Giannis Fivos Botos	Pardubice	Undisclosed	
6 January 2026	FW	(Czech Republic)	Daniel Toula	Artis Brno	Undisclosed	
8 January 2026	GK	(Czech Republic)	Aleš Mandous	Pardubice	Undisclosed	
20 January 2026	MF	(Norway)	Conrad Wallem	St. Louis City	Undisclosed	

=== Loans out ===
Date from	Position	Nationality	Name	To	Date to	Ref.
18 July 2025	MF	(Kenya)	Timothy Ouma	Lech Poznań	30 June 2026	
26 July 2025	MF	(Czech Republic)	Dominik Pech	Young Boys	30 June 2026	
31 July 2025	FW	(Nigeria)	Muhamed Tijani	Sigma Olomouc	30 June 2026	
8 September 2025	MF	(Liberia)	Divine Teah	Pardubice	31 December 2025	
10 September 2025	DF	(Nigeria)	Samuel Isife	Dukla Prague	31 December 2025	
8 January 2026	MF	(Czech Republic)	Tomas Jelinek	Pardubice	30 June 2026	
8 January 2026	MF	(Czech Republic)	Tobias Boledovič	Pardubice	30 June 2026	
8 January 2026	FW	(Czech Republic)	Lukáš Vorlický	Zbrojovka Brno	30 June 2026	
16 January 2026	DF	(Liberia)	Emmanuel Fully	Teplice	30 June 2026	
29 January 2026	DF	(Czech Republic)	Šimon Slončík	Karviná	30 June 2026	
29 January 2026	MF	(Czech Republic)	Filip Prebsl	Karviná	30 June 2026	
2 February 2026	DF	(Japan)	Daiki Hashioka	KAA Gent	30 June 2026	
25 February 2026	DF	(Czech Republic)	Ondřej Zmrzlý	Górnik Zabrze	30 June 2026	

== Friendlies ==
21 June 2025	Slavia Prague	2–1	Ludogorets Razgrad	Schörfling am Attersee, Austria
18:00 CEST (UTC+2)	Chytil 13', 37'	Report	Goal	Stadium: Sportplatz SK Kammer

2 July 2025	Slavia Prague	5–2	Universitatea Cluj	Ansfelden, Austria
CEST (UTC+2)	Toula 7'; Chytil 13', 29', 52'; Pech 35'	Report	Thiam 46'; Nistor 79' (pen.)	Stadium: Union Ansfelden; Attendance: 892

5 July 2025	Blau-Weiß Linz	0–1	Slavia Prague	Rohrbach, Austria
18:00 CEST (UTC+2)	Ronivaldo (yellow card); Pirkl (yellow card); Pasic (yellow card)	Report	Zmrzlý 71' (yellow card); Bořil (yellow card); Douděra (yellow card)	Stadium: Sportanlage Rohrbach-Berg; Attendance: 1,200; Referee: Wagner Platzer–Kuppinger

9 July 2025	Diósgyőri VTK	0–2	Slavia Prague	Bad Wimsbach-Neydharting, Austria
15:30 CEST (UTC+2)	Šaponjić (yellow card); Gera (yellow card)	Report	Chytil 77'; Tijani 88'; Douděra (yellow card); Ogbu (yellow card)	Stadium: Sportstraße 17

9 July 2025	Aris Limassol	2–3	Slavia Prague	Bad Wimsbach-Neydharting, Austria
19:00 CEST (UTC+2)	Goldson (yellow card) 45'; Theodosiou 79'; Kvilitaia 89'	Report	Sanyang (yellow card) 7'; Teah 39'; Sadílek 43'; Michez 69'	Stadium: Sportstraße 17

13 July 2025	Slavia Prague	4–2	Dynamo Dresden	Prague, Czechia
CEST (UTC+2)	Kušej 47'; Douděra 58'; Teah 63'; Hashioka 65'	Report	Fröling 81'; Müller 84'; Bünning (yellow card); Rossipal (yellow card)	Stadium: Fortuna Arena; Attendance: 18,642

6 January 2026	Slavia Prague	3–4	Basel	Marbella, Spain
15:00 CET (UTC+1)	Cham 39'; Schranz 43'; Bořil (yellow card) 90'; Isife 90+2'	Report	Ajeti 8'; Shaqiri 65'; Eduardo 82'; Salah 87' (pen.)	Stadium: Marbella Football Center

10 January 2026	Slavia Prague	1–1	Karlsruher SC	Marbella, Spain
CET (UTC+1)	Prekop 51'	Report	Ben Farhat 10'	Stadium: Estepona Football Center

16 January 2026	Slavia Prague	2–1	SK Brann	Marbella, Spain
CET (UTC+1)	Mbodji (yellow card) 75' (goal) 88'; Kušej 85'	Report	Pedersen (yellow card) 27'; Kornvig 63' (pen.)	Stadium: Marbella Football Center

== Competitions ==
=== Overall record ===
Competition	First match	Last match	Starting round	Final position	Record							
Competition	First match	Last match	Starting round	Final position	Pld	W	D	L	GF	GA	GD	Win %
Czech First League	20 July 2025	24 May 2026	Matchday 1	Winners	35	24	8	3	74	30	+44	68.57
Czech Cup	23 September 2025	3 March 2026	Third round	Quarterfinal	3	2	1	0	8	2	+6	66.67
UEFA Champions League	17 September 2025	28 January 2026	League phase	League phase (34th)	8	0	3	5	5	19	−14	0.00
Total					46	26	12	8	87	51	+36	56.52

Last updated: 24 May 2026
Source: Soccerway

=== Czech First League ===
==== Regular season ====
===== League table =====
Pos	Team	Pld	W	D	L	GF	GA	GD	Pts	Qualification or relegation
1	Slavia Prague	30	21	8	1	63	23	+40	71	Qualification for the championship group
2	Sparta Prague	30	19	6	5	60	33	+27	63	Qualification for the championship group
3	Viktoria Plzeň	30	15	8	7	50	34	+16	53	Qualification for the championship group
4	Jablonec	30	15	6	9	41	33	+8	51	Qualification for the championship group
5	Hradec Králové	30	14	7	9	43	34	+9	49	Qualification for the championship group

Source: Chance Liga
Rules for classification: 1) Points; 2) Head-to-head points; 3) Head-to-head goal difference; 4) Head-to-head goals scored; 5) Goal difference; 6) Goals scored; 7) Fair-play ranking; 8) Draw.

===== Results summary =====
Overall								Home						Away					
Pld	W	D	L	GF	GA	GD	Pts	W	D	L	GF	GA	GD	W	D	L	GF	GA	GD
30	21	8	1	63	23	+40	71	12	3	0	35	10	+25	9	5	1	28	13	+15

Last updated: 25 April 2026.
Source: Chance Liga

===== Results by round =====
Round	1	2	3	4	5	6	7	8	9	10	11	12	13	14	15	16	17	18	19	20	21	22	23	24	25	26	28	29	30	27
Ground	H	A	A	H	A	H	A	H	A	H	A	H	A	H	A	H	H	A	H	A	H	A	H	A	H	A	A	H	A	H
Result	D	W	W	W	D	W	W	W	D	W	D	D	D	W	W	W	W	W	W	D	W	W	W	W	W	W	W	D	L	W
Position	9	4	2	1	1	1	1	1	2	2	2	2	3	1	1	1	1	1	1	1	1	1	1	1	1	1	1	1	1	1

Updated to match(es) played on 25 April 2026. Source: Chance Liga
A = Away; H = Home; W = Win; D = Draw; L = Loss

===== Results =====
20 July 2025 1	Slavia Prague	2–2	Hradec Králové	Prague
20:00 CEST (UTC+2)	Sadílek (yellow card) 56'; Chorý 58'; Zafeiris 82'; Douděra (yellow card) 83'	Report	Sojka 40'; Harazim (yellow card) 67'; Hodek 87'	Stadium: Fortuna Arena; Attendance: 18,780; Referee: Karel Rouček

26 July 2025 2	Bohemians 1905	0–2	Slavia Prague	Prague
20:00 CEST (UTC+2)	Sakala (yellow card) 75'; Hrubý (yellow card) 86'	Report	Provod 39'; Zafeiris (yellow card) 45+3'; Chorý (yellow card) 68'; Kušej 70'; Zima (yellow card) 79'; Moses (yellow card) 90+2'	Stadium: Ďolíček; Attendance: 5,893; Referee: Ondřej Pechanec

3 August 2025 3	Slovácko	0–1	Slavia Prague	Uherské Hradiště
15:00 CEST (UTC+2)	Stojchevski (yellow card) 38'; Petržela (yellow card) 41'; Marinelli (yellow card) 66'; Trávník (yellow card) 68'	Report	Schranz 69'; Douděra (yellow card) 83'; Chorý (red card) 90+7'	Stadium: Městský fotbalový stadion Miroslava Valenty; Attendance: 7,174; Referee: Jan Všetečka

9 August 2025 4	Slavia Prague	3–0	Teplice	Prague
20:00 CEST (UTC+2)	Provod 31'; Vasil Kušej (yellow card) 31'; Zafeiris 52'; Bořil 55'	Report	Večerka (red card) 66'	Stadium: Fortuna Arena; Attendance: 18,498; Referee: Dominik Starý

16 August 2025 5	Jablonec	1–1	Slavia Prague	Jablonec nad Nisou
20:00 CEST (UTC+2)	Chramosta 29'; Martinec (yellow card) 43'; Alégué (yellow card) 63'; Jawo (yellow card) 64'; Nebyla (yellow card) 69'; Hanuš (yellow card) 74'; Chanturishvili (yellow card) 85'; Fortelný (yellow card) 90+3'	Report	Ogbu (yellow card) 5'; Holeš (yellow card) 24'; Bořil (yellow card) 38'; Douděra (yellow card) 54' (goal) 90'	Stadium: Stadion Střelnice; Attendance: 5,500; Referee: Karel Rouček

23 August 2025 6	Slavia Prague	3–1	Pardubice	Prague
20:00 CEST (UTC+2)	Holeš 23'; Bořil 54'; Kušej 90+1'	Report	Patrák 12' (yellow card) 58'; Tanko (red card) 82'	Stadium: Fortuna Arena; Attendance: 18,297; Referee: Stanislav Volek

30 August 2025 7	Mladá Boleslav	1–3	Slavia Prague	Mladá Boleslav
20:00 CEST (UTC+2)	Vojta 52' (pen.); Langhamer (yellow card) 54'	Report	Chytil 15'; Ogbu (yellow card) 45'; Staněk (yellow card) 53'; Sadílek (yellow card) 57'; Chaloupek 73'; Schranz 90+4'	Stadium: Lokotrans Aréna; Attendance: 4,271; Referee: Dominik Starý

13 September 2025 8	Slavia Prague	3–1	MFK Karviná	Prague
18:00 CEST (UTC+2)	Chytil 19'; Vorlický (yellow card) 64' (goal) 67', 90'; Provod (yellow card) 75'; Dorley (yellow card) 85'	Report	Gning (yellow card) 15'; Štorman 45+3'; Camara (red card) 86'	Stadium: Fortuna Arena; Attendance: 19,309; Referee: Stanislav Volek

21 September 2025 9	Slovan Liberec	1–1	Slavia Prague	Liberec
15:30 CEST (UTC+2)	Hodouš 14'; Koželuh (yellow card) 20'; N'Guessan (yellow card) 58'; Kayondo (yellow card) 90+7'	Report	Chaloupek (yellow card) 9'; Zmrzlý (yellow card) 70'; Kušej (yellow card) 79' (goal) 87'	Stadium: Stadion u Nisy; Attendance: 8,062; Referee: Jan Všetečka

26 September 2025 10	Slavia Prague	2–0	Dukla Prague	Prague
19:00 CEST (UTC+2)	Chorý 24', 40' (pen.) (yellow card) 33'	Report	Čermák (yellow card) 56'; Hunal (yellow card) 90+2'	Stadium: Fortuna Arena; Attendance: 18,156; Referee: Dalibor Černý

5 October 2025 11	Sparta Prague	1–1	Slavia Prague	Prague
18:30 CEST (UTC+2)	Kuchta (yellow card) 32'; Vydra (yellow card) 33'; Ryneš (yellow card) 35'; Rrahmani 45+6'; Mannsverk (yellow card) 60'	Report	Dorley (yellow card) 11'; Kušej 15'; Chaloupek (yellow card) 31'; Vlček (yellow card) 35' (red card) 66'; Moses (yellow card) 79'	Stadium: Stadion Letná; Attendance: 18,213; Referee: Jan Všetečka

18 October 2025 12	Slavia Prague	0–0	Zlín	Prague
18:00 CEST (UTC+2)	Chaloupek (yellow card) 74'; Dorley (yellow card) 84'	Report	Černín (yellow card) 14'; Nombil (yellow card) 41'; Ulbrich (yellow card) 90+4'	Stadium: Fortuna Arena; Attendance: 18,214; Referee: Jan Beneš

26 October 2025 13	Sigma Olomouc	0–0	Slavia Prague	Olomouc
13:00 CET (UTC+1)	Sláma (yellow card) 33'; Breite (yellow card) HT; Šíp (yellow card) 90+2'	Report	Kušej (yellow card) 33'	Stadium: Andrův stadion Attendance: 9,440; Referee: Dominik Starý

1 November 2025 14	Slavia Prague	1–0	Baník Ostrava	Prague
18:00 CET (UTC+1)	Vlček 55'; Chytil 62'	Report	Owusu (yellow card) 20'; Pojezný (yellow card) 45+3'; Bewene (yellow card) 53'; Chaluš (yellow card) 90+5'	Stadium: Fortuna Arena; Attendance: 18,864; Referee: Marek Radina

9 November 2025 15	Viktoria Plzeň	3–5	Slavia Prague	Plzeň
18:30 CET (UTC+1)	Spáčil (yellow card) 13'; Ladra 32'; Dweh (yellow card) 32'; Červ (yellow card) 45+3' (goal) 61'; Doski (yellow card) 45+8'; Marković (yellow card) 45+16'; Memić (yellow card) 75'	Report	Sanyang 27'; Chorý 42', 49'; Chaloupek 45+5'; Sadílek (yellow card) 45+13'; Vlček (yellow card) 45+17'; Moses (yellow card) 57'; Zima (yellow card) 62'; Mbodji (yellow card) 68'; Douděra (yellow card) 77'; Zafeiris 84'	Stadium: Doosan Arena; Attendance: 11,198; Referee: Jan Beneš

22 November 2025 16	Slavia Prague	3–1	Bohemians 1905	Prague
18:00 CET (UTC+1)	Chorý 17'; Bořil (yellow card) 30'; Okeke 41' (o.g.); Provod 73'	Report	Drchal (yellow card) 36'; Kadlec 77'; Kareem (yellow card) 89'	Stadium: Fortuna Arena; Attendance: 18,992; Referee: Jakub Wulkan

29 November 2025 17	Slavia Prague	3–0	Slovácko	Prague
18:00 CET (UTC+1)	Bořil (yellow card) 13'; Chytil 17' (pen.), 63'; Chorý 37'; Chaloupek (yellow card) 76'	Report		Stadium: Fortuna Arena; Attendance: 16,087; Referee: Stanislav Volek

5 December 2025 18	Teplice	1–2	Slavia Prague	Teplice
18:00 CET (UTC+1)	Pulkrab (yellow card) 24'; Kozák 86'	Report	Chytil 62', 68' (pen.); Holeš (yellow card) 77'; Sadílek (yellow card) 77'	Stadium: Na Stínadlech; Attendance: 7,784; Referee: Marek Radina

13 December 2025 19	Slavia Prague	4–3	Jablonec	Prague
18:00 CET (UTC+1)	Provod 10'; Chorý 38' (pen.), 71'; Chaloupek 55'; Zafeiris (yellow card) 61'	Report	Tekijaški 34'; Zorvan 45+2'; Innocenti (yellow card) 46'; Jawo 57' (yellow card) 77'; Cedidla (yellow card) 90+1'	Stadium: Fortuna Arena; Attendance: 17,909; Referee: Jan Beneš

1 February 2026 20	Pardubice	1–1	Slavia Prague	Pardubice
18:30 CET (UTC+1)	Vecheta 84'	Report	Provod 6' (yellow card) 56'; Dorley (red card) 15'; Mbodji (yellow card) 90+5'	Stadium: Stadion Arnošta Košťála; Attendance: 4,620; Referee: Lukáš Nehasil

7 February 2026 21	Slavia Prague	4–0	Mladá Boleslav	Prague
18:00 CET (UTC+1)	Chorý 9', 28'; Douděra (yellow card) 53'; Sadílek 58'; Isife (yellow card) 77'; Suleiman 90+3'	Report		Stadium: Fortuna Arena; Attendance: 17,250; Referee: Dalibor Černý

14 February 2026 22	MFK Karviná	1–3	Slavia Prague	Karviná
15:00 CET (UTC+1)	Kačor (yellow card) 14' (goal) 38'	Report	Chorý 16'; Bořil 60'; Chytil 72'; Prekop (yellow card) 77'; Isife (yellow card) 81'	Stadium: Městský stadion Attendance: 3,124; Referee: Marek Radina

21 February 2026 23	Slavia Prague	1–0	Slovan Liberec	Prague
18:00 CET (UTC+1)	Holeš (yellow card) 26'; Chorý (yellow card) 30' (goal) 59' (pen.); Chaloupek (yellow card) 79'; Sadílek (yellow card) 90+6'	Report	Kayondo (yellow card) 21'	Stadium: Fortuna Arena; Attendance: 18,036; Referee: Ondřej Pechanec

27 February 2026 24	Dukla Prague	0–2	Slavia Prague	Prague
18:00 CET (UTC+1)	Diallo (yellow card) 90+2'	Report	Kušej 20'; Chorý 32' (pen.)	Stadium: Stadion Juliska; Attendance: 7,173; Referee: Dalibor Černý

8 March 2026 25	Slavia Prague	3–1	Sparta Prague	Prague
18:30 CET (UTC+1)	Schranz (yellow card) 22'; Chorý 57' (pen.), 82'; Chytil 79'	Report	Mercado (yellow card) 30'; Vydra 45+6'; Mannsverk (yellow card) 45+9'; Kadeřábek (yellow card) 62'; Ryneš (yellow card) 70'; Ševínský (yellow card) 84'; Sonne (yellow card) 85'	Stadium: Fortuna Arena; Attendance: 19,314; Referee: Stanislav Volek

14 March 2026 26	Zlín	1–3	Slavia Prague	Zlín
18:00 CET (UTC+1)	Bartošák (yellow card) 89'; Černín 90+2'	Report	Chaloupek 12'; Provod 66'; Chytil 77'	Stadium: Letná Stadion; Attendance: 5,592; Referee: Karel Rouček

5 April 2026 28	Baník Ostrava	0–2	Slavia Prague	Ostrava
15:30 CET (UTC+1)	Bewene (yellow card) 30'	Report	Chorý 23' (pen.); Provod 32'	Stadium: Městský Stadion; Attendance: 15,037; Referee: Jakub Wulkan

12 April 2026 29	Slavia Prague	0–0	Viktoria Plzeň	Prague
18:30 CET (UTC+1)	Isife (yellow card) 57'; Sadílek (yellow card) 75'; Douděra (yellow card) 85'; Chorý (red card) 89'; Holeš (yellow card) 90+5'	Report	Adu (yellow card) 22'; Sojka (yellow card) 50'; Doski (yellow card) 74'; Jemelka (yellow card) 88'	Stadium: Fortuna Arena; Attendance: 18,812; Referee: Marek Radina

19 April 2026 30	Hradec Králové	2–1	Slavia Prague	Hradec Králové
15:30 CET (UTC+1)	van Buren 39'; Čihák (yellow card) 90+2'; Darida 90+3' (pen.)	Report	Prekop 21' (pen.) (yellow card) 29'; Mbodji (red card) 88'; Bořil (yellow card) 90+2' (yellow-red card) 90+2'	Stadium: Malšovická aréna Attendance: 9,300; Referee: Dalibor Černý

25 April 2026 27	Slavia Prague	2–1	Sigma Olomouc	Prague
16:00 CET (UTC+1)	Chytil 58'; Moses 82'	Report	Sejk (yellow card) 10' (goal) 15'; Lurvink (red card) 32'	Stadium: Fortuna Arena; Attendance: 18,608; Referee: Stanislav Volek

==== Championship group ====
===== League table =====
Pos	Team	Pld	W	D	L	GF	GA	GD	Pts	Qualification or relegation
1	Slavia Prague (C)	35	24	8	3	74	31	+43	80	Qualification for the Champions League league phase
2	Sparta Prague	35	23	7	5	69	34	+35	76	Qualification for the Champions League third qualifying round
3	Viktoria Plzeň	35	18	9	8	60	38	+22	63	Qualification for the Europa League play-off round
4	Hradec Králové	35	16	8	11	50	41	+9	56	Qualification for the Europa League second qualifying round
5	Jablonec	35	16	7	12	45	47	−2	55	Qualification for the Conference League second qualifying round
6	Slovan Liberec	35	12	10	13	45	39	+6	46	

Source: Chance Liga
Rules for classification: 1) Total points; 2) Points earned in regular season; 3) Head-to-head points (regular season); 4) Head-to-head goal difference (regular season); 5) Head-to-head goals scored (regular season); 5) Goal difference (all matches); 6) Goals scored (all matches); 7) Fair-play ranking; 8) Draw.
(C) Champions

===== Results summary =====
Overall								Home						Away					
Pld	W	D	L	GF	GA	GD	Pts	W	D	L	GF	GA	GD	W	D	L	GF	GA	GD
5	3	0	2	12	8	+4	9	2	0	1	8	4	+4	1	0	1	4	4	0

Last updated: 24 May 2026.
Source: See results

===== Results by round =====
Round	31	32	33	34	35
Ground	A	H	H	A	H
Result	W	L	W	L	W
Position	1	1	1	1	1

Updated to match(es) played on 24 May 2026. Source: See results
A = Away; H = Home; W = Win; D = Draw; L = Loss

===== Results =====
2 May 2026 31	Slovan Liberec	1–2	Slavia Prague	Liberec
18:00 CEST (UTC+2)	Mahmić (yellow card) 34' (goal) 50'; Drakpe (yellow card) 45+2' (yellow-red card) 83'; Stránský (yellow card) 78'; N'Guessan (yellow card) 90'; Krollis (yellow card) 90+4'; Špatenka (yellow card) 90+6'	Report	Ogbu 18'; Jurásek 45+4'; Vlček (yellow card) 90+12'	Stadium: Stadion u Nisy; Attendance: 8,316; Referee: Jakub Wulkan

9 May 2026 32	Slavia Prague	0–3	Sparta Prague	Prague
19:00 CEST (UTC+2)	Dorley 31'; Chaloupek 52'; Zima 53'; Chorý (red card) 59'; Douděra (red card) 90+1'	Report	Mannsverk (yellow card) 19'; Kuchta 22'; Kairinen (yellow card) 33'; Sørensen 47'; Vojta (yellow card) 77'; Martinec (yellow card) 88'; Irving (yellow card) 89'; Ševínský (yellow card) 90+4'; Ryneš (yellow card) 90+4'	Stadium: Fortuna Arena; Attendance: 19,194; Referee: Karel Rouček
Note: Match abandoned in the 97th minute, with Slavia leading 3–2, due to a pitch invasion and spectator riots.

13 May 2026 33	Slavia Prague	5–1	Jablonec	Prague
20:00 CEST (UTC+2)	Chaloupek 14', 56'; Isife 37'; Chytil 43'; Holeš 49' (yellow card) 79'; Mbodji (yellow card) 88'	Report	Sobol (yellow card) 1' (goal) 62'	Stadium: Fortuna Arena; Attendance: 0 Referee: Marek Radina
Note: Match played behind closed doors.

17 May 2026 34	Hradec Králové	3–1	Slavia Prague	Hradec Králové
17:00 CEST (UTC+2)	Mihálik 19'; Darida 60'; Horák 77'	Report	Kohout 85'	Stadium: Malšovická aréna Attendance: 9,300; Referee: Lukáš Nehasil

24 May 2026 35	Slavia Prague	3–0	Viktoria Plzeň	Prague
14:00 CEST (UTC+2)	Chaloupek 2'; Suleiman 6'; Chytil 38' (pen.)	Report	Dweh (yellow card) 25'; Valenta (yellow card) 37'	Stadium: Fortuna Arena; Attendance: 0 Referee: Dalibor Černý
Note: Match played behind closed doors.

=== Czech Cup ===
23 September 2025 Third Round	Sokol Brozany	0–2	Slavia Prague	Brozany nad Ohří
16:00 CEST (UTC+2)	Novotny (yellow card) 41'; Soungole (red card) 74'	Report	Zmrzlý 36'; Fully (yellow card) 90+2' (goal) 90+6'	Stadium: Hlavní Stadion; Attendance: 2,313; Referee: Vojtěch Opočenský

29 October 2025 Round of 16	Zlín	0–4	Slavia Prague	Zlín
16:30 CET (UTC+1)	Machalík (yellow card) 2'; Fukala (yellow card) 61'; Koubek (yellow card) 87'	Report	Chytil 20'; Jelinek (yellow card) 37' (goal) 79'; Hashioka (yellow card) 45+3'; Provod 77'; Sadílek 90+1'	Stadium: Letná Stadion; Attendance: 4,717; Referee: Jakub Wulkan

3 March 2026 Quarterfinal	Jablonec	2–2 (a.e.t.) (3–2 p)	Slavia Prague	Jablonec nad Nisou
17:00 CEST (UTC+2)	Chramosta 53'; Zorvan (yellow card) 78'; Singhateh 80'; Mihelak (yellow card) 83'; Jawo (yellow card) 89'	Report	Suleiman 6'; Kušej (yellow card) 83'; Mbodji (yellow card) 89' (goal) 90+4'	Stadium: Stadion Střelnice; Attendance: 3,351; Referee: Jan Všetečka
	Penalties
	Novák (penalty missed); Štěpánek (penalty scored); Jawo (penalty scored); Singhateh (penalty scored)		(penalty scored) Chorý; (penalty missed) Chaloupek; (penalty scored) Jurásek; (penalty missed) Holeš; (penalty missed) Kušej

=== UEFA Champions League ===
==== League Phase ====
Pos	Team	Pld	W	D	L	GF	GA	GD	Pts
32	(Royal Dutch Football Association) Ajax	8	2	0	6	8	21	−13	6
33	(German Football Association) Eintracht Frankfurt	8	1	1	6	10	21	−11	4
34	(Football Association of the Czech Republic) Slavia Prague	8	0	3	5	5	19	−14	3
35	(Royal Spanish Football Federation) Villarreal	8	0	1	7	5	18	−13	1
36	(Kazakhstan Football Federation) Kairat	8	0	1	7	7	22	−15	1

Source: UEFA
Rules for classification: League phase tiebreakers

17 September 2025 1	Slavia Prague (Czech Republic)	2–2	(Norway) Bodø/Glimt	Prague
18:45 CEST (UTC+2)	Mbodji 23', 74' (yellow card) 69'; Chytil (yellow card) 90+9'	Report	Bjørtuft (yellow card) 45+2'; Høgh (penalty missed) 54'; Bassi 78'; Aleesami (yellow card) 79'; Berg (yellow card) 85'; Brunstad Fet 90'	Stadium: Fortuna Arena; Attendance: 18,922; Referee: Marian Barbu (Romania)

30 September 2025 2	Inter Milan (Italy)	3–0	(Czech Republic) Slavia Prague	Milan
21:00 CEST (UTC+2)	L.Martínez 30', 65' (yellow card) 61'; Dumfries 34'; Bisseck (yellow card) 48'	Report	Schranz (yellow card) 56'	Stadium: San Siro; Attendance: 62,317; Referee: Chris Kavanagh (England)

22 October 2025 3	Atalanta (Italy)	0–0	(Czech Republic) Slavia Prague	Bergamo
21:00 CEST (UTC+2)	Bernasconi (yellow card) 35' de Roon (yellow card) 51'; Djimsiti (yellow card) 90+4'	Report	Bořil (yellow card) 87'; Prekop (yellow card) 90+4'	Stadium: Stadio Atleti Azzurri d'Italia; Attendance: 22,152; Referee: Ricardo de Burgos Bengoetxea (Spain)

4 November 2025 4	Slavia Prague (Czech Republic)	0–3	(England) Arsenal	Prague
18:45 CET (UTC+1)	Zafiris (yellow card) 70'; Douděra (yellow card) 83'; Mbodji (yellow card) 90+6'	Report	Nwaneri (yellow card) 24'; Saka 32' (pen.); Merino (yellow card) 37', (goal) 46', 68'; Nørgaard (yellow card) 75'; Lewis-Skelly (yellow card) 79'	Stadium: Fortuna Arena; Attendance: 19,222; Referee: Aliyar Aghayev (Azerbaijan)

25 November 2025 5	Slavia Prague (Czech Republic)	0–0	(Spain) Athletic Bilbao	Prague
21:00 CET (UTC+1)	Provod (yellow card) 15'; Chorý (yellow card) 40'	Report	Guruzeta (yellow card) 19'; Ruiz de Galarreta (yellow card) 45+3'; Paredes (yellow card) 85'	Stadium: Fortuna Arena; Attendance: 19,169; Referee: Donatas Rumšas (Lithuania)

9 December 2025 6	Tottenham Hotspur (England)	3–0	(Czech Republic) Slavia Prague	London
21:00 CET (UTC+1)	van de Ven (yellow card) 15'; Zima 26' (o.g.); João Palhinha (yellow card) 40'; Kudus 50' (pen.); Simons 79' (pen.)	Report	Chaloupek (yellow card) 13'; Obgu (yellow card) 28'; Sanyang (yellow card) 48'; Zima (yellow card) 56'	Stadium: Tottenham Hotspur Stadium; Attendance: 47,281; Referee: Benoit Bastien (France)

21 January 2026 7	Slavia Prague (Czech Republic)	2–4	(Spain) Barcelona	Prague
21:00 CET (UTC+1)	Kušej 10'; Lewandowski 44' (o.g.)	Report	López 34', 42'; Olmo 63'; Lewandowski 71' de Jong (yellow card) 87'	Stadium: Fortuna Arena; Attendance: 19,242; Referee: Chris Kavanagh (England)

28 January 2026 8	Pafos (Cyprus)	4–1	(Czech Republic) Slavia Prague	Limassol, Cyprus
21:00 CET (UTC+1)	Dragomir 17'; Bruno 53'; Anderson 84'; Oršić 87'; Luiz (yellow card) 90+1'; Gorter (yellow card) 90+6'	Report	Zima (yellow card) 26'; Chaloupek 44'; Bořil (red card) 59'	Stadium: Alphamega Stadium; Attendance: 5,109; Referee: Tobias Stieler (Germany)
Note: Match played at the Alphamega Stadium in Limassol, instead of Pafos' regular Stelios Kyriakides Stadium in Paphos, which did not meet UEFA requirements.

== Squad statistics ==
As of match played 24 May 2026

=== Appearances and goals ===
No.	Pos	Nat	Player	Total		HET liga		MOL Cup		Champions League	
No.	Pos	Nat	Player	Apps	Goals	Apps	Goals	Apps	Goals	Apps	Goals
1	GK	(Czech Republic) CZE	Ondřej Kolář	1	0	0+1	0	0	0	0	0
2	DF	(Czech Republic) CZE	Štěpán Chaloupek	38	8	20+8	7	1+1	0	6+2	1
3	DF	(Czech Republic) CZE	Tomáš Holeš	30	2	23+2	2	0+1	0	3+1	0
4	DF	(Czech Republic) CZE	David Zima	33	0	22+2	0	1	0	8	0
5	DF	(Nigeria) NGR	Igoh Ogbu	20	1	14+3	1	1	0	2	0
6	DF	(Czech Republic) CZE	Elias Pitak	2	0	1	0	0+1	0	0	0
9	FW	(Czech Republic) CZE	Vasil Kušej	37	6	17+12	5	0+1	0	4+3	1
10	MF	(Austria) AUT	Muhammed Cham	25	0	5+11	0	2+1	0	1+5	0
11	FW	(The Gambia) GAM	Youssoupha Sanyang	21	1	9+4	1	2	0	4+2	0
12	DF	(Senegal) SEN	Youssoupha Mbodji	18	3	4+6	0	0+1	1	5+2	2
13	FW	(Czech Republic) CZE	Mojmír Chytil	37	14	15+14	13	2	1	1+5	0
14	DF	(Nigeria) NGR	Samuel Isife	14	1	7+6	1	1	0	0	0
16	MF	(Nigeria) NGR	David Moses	33	1	19+7	1	0+2	0	5	0
17	MF	(Czech Republic) CZE	Lukáš Provod	39	8	28+2	7	0+1	1	8	0
18	DF	(Czech Republic) CZE	Jan Bořil	25	3	20+2	3	0	0	1+2	0
19	MF	(Liberia) LBR	Oscar Dorley	28	0	16+6	0	1	0	5	0
20	MF	(Czech Republic) CZE	Alexandr Bužek	7	0	4+3	0	0	0	0	0
21	MF	(Czech Republic) CZE	David Douděra	29	1	18+4	1	0	0	5+2	0
22	FW	(Czech Republic) CZE	Lukáš Vorlický	9	2	0+8	2	0+1	0	0	0
23	MF	(Czech Republic) CZE	Michal Sadílek	39	2	23+6	1	2	1	7+1	0
25	FW	(Czech Republic) CZE	Tomáš Chorý	33	17	23+1	17	0+2	0	5+2	0
26	FW	(Slovakia) SVK	Ivan Schranz	20	2	7+9	2	1	0	0+3	0
27	DF	(Czech Republic) CZE	Tomáš Vlček	24	1	8+8	1	3	0	3+2	0
31	FW	(Slovakia) SVK	Erik Prekop	24	1	5+14	1	2	0	1+2	0
33	DF	(Czech Republic) CZE	Ondřej Zmrzlý	13	1	7+4	0	2	1	0	0
35	GK	(Czech Republic) CZE	Jakub Markovič	21	0	16	0	3	0	2	0
36	GK	(Czech Republic) CZE	Jindřich Staněk	25	0	19	0	0	0	6	0
37	DF	(Slovakia) SVK	Dominik Javorček	1	0	0+1	0	0	0	0	0
39	DF	(Czech Republic) CZE	David Jurásek	17	1	15+1	1	1	0	0	0
41	MF	(Cameroon) CMR	Simion Michez	1	0	0	0	0+1	0	0	0
45	MF	(Nigeria) NGR	Mubarak Suleiman	9	3	4+4	2	1	1	0	0
Slavia B:
43	FW	(Czech Republic) CZE	Dan Kohout	2	1	0+2	1	0	0	0	0
45	MF	(Slovakia) SVK	Adam Rajnoha	1	0	0	0	1	0	0	0
46	DF	(Czech Republic) CZE	Jakub Kolisek	3	0	1+1	0	1	0	0	0
48	FW	(Czech Republic) CZE	Petr Potmesil	1	0	0	0	0+1	0	0	0
Players away on loan:
8	DF	(Japan) JPN	Daiki Hashioka	14	0	2+6	0	2	0	1+3	0
14	MF	(Czech Republic) CZE	Tomas Jelinek	3	1	1	0	2	1	0	0
15	DF	(Liberia) LBR	Emmanuel Fully	5	1	0+3	0	1+1	1	0	0
29	MF	(Liberia) LBR	Divine Teah	2	0	0+2	0	0	0	0	0
Players who left Slavia Prague during the season:
10	MF	(Greece) GRE	Christos Zafeiris	23	3	12+5	3	0	0	5+1	0
30	FW	(Czech Republic) CZE	Daniel Toula	1	0	0	0	0+1	0	0	0

=== Goal scorers ===
Place	Position	Nation	Number	Name	HET liga	MOL Cup	Champions League	Total
1	FW	(Czech Republic)	25	Tomáš Chorý	17	0	0	17
2	FW	(Czech Republic)	13	Mojmír Chytil	13	1	0	14
3	MF	(Czech Republic)	17	Lukáš Provod	7	1	0	8
3	DF	(Czech Republic)	2	Štěpán Chaloupek	7	0	1	8
5	FW	(Czech Republic)	9	Vasil Kušej	5	0	1	6
6	MF	(Greece)	10	Christos Zafeiris	3	0	0	3
6	DF	(Czech Republic)	18	Jan Bořil	3	0	0	3
6	MF	(Nigeria)	45	Mubarak Suleiman	2	1	0	3
6	DF	(Senegal)	12	Youssoupha Mbodji	0	1	2	3
10	FW	(Slovakia)	26	Ivan Schranz	2	0	0	2
10	MF	(Czech Republic)	22	Lukáš Vorlický	2	0	0	2
10	DF	(Czech Republic)	3	Tomáš Holeš	2	0	0	2
10				Own Goal	1	0	1	2
14	MF	(Czech Republic)	21	David Douděra	1	0	0	1
14	DF	(Czech Republic)	27	Tomáš Vlček	1	0	0	1
14	FW	(The Gambia)	11	Youssoupha Sanyang	1	0	0	1
14	MF	(Czech Republic)	23	Michal Sadílek	1	0	0	1
14	FW	(Slovakia)	31	Erik Prekop	1	0	0	1
14	MF	(Nigeria)	16	David Moses	1	0	0	1
14	DF	(Nigeria)	5	Igoh Ogbu	1	0	0	1
14	DF	(Czech Republic)	39	David Jurásek	1	0	0	1
14	DF	(Nigeria)	14	Samuel Isife	1	0	0	1
14	FW	(Czech Republic)	43	Dan Kohout	1	0	0	1
14	DF	(Czech Republic)	33	Ondřej Zmrzlý	0	1	0	1
14	DF	(Liberia)	15	Emmanuel Fully	0	1	0	1
14	MF	(Czech Republic)	14	Tomas Jelinek	0	1	0	1
14	MF	(Czech Republic)	23	Michal Sadílek	0	1	0	1
				TOTALS	74	8	5	87

=== Clean sheets ===
Place	Position	Nation	Number	Name	HET liga	MOL Cup	Champions League	Total
1	GK	(Czech Republic)	35	Jakub Markovič	8	2	1	11
2	GK	(Czech Republic)	36	Jindřich Staněk	6	0	1	7
3	GK	(Czech Republic)	1	Ondřej Kolář	1	0	0	1
				TOTALS	14	2	2	18

Jakub Markovič & Ondřej Kolář both played in Slavia's 3-0 victory over Viktoria Plzeň on 24 May 2026

=== Disciplinary record ===
Number	Nation	Position	Name	HET liga		MOL Cup		Champions League		Total	
Number	Nation	Position	Name	Yellow card	Red card	Yellow card	Red card	Yellow card	Red card	Yellow card	Red card
2	(Czech Republic)	DF	Štěpán Chaloupek	5	0	0	0	1	0	6	0
3	(Czech Republic)	DF	Tomáš Holeš	5	0	0	0	0	0	5	0
4	(Czech Republic)	DF	David Zima	2	0	0	0	2	0	4	0
5	(Nigeria)	DF	Igoh Ogbu	2	0	0	0	1	0	3	0
9	(Czech Republic)	FW	Vasil Kušej	3	0	1	0	0	0	4	0
11	(The Gambia)	FW	Youssoupha Sanyang	0	0	0	0	1	0	1	0
12	(Senegal)	DF	Youssoupha Mbodji	3	1	1	0	2	0	6	1
13	(Czech Republic)	FW	Mojmír Chytil	0	0	0	0	1	0	1	0
14	(Nigeria)	DF	Samuel Isife	3	0	0	0	0	0	3	0
16	(Nigeria)	MF	David Moses	3	0	0	0	0	0	3	0
17	(Czech Republic)	MF	Lukáš Provod	2	0	0	0	1	0	3	0
18	(Czech Republic)	DF	Jan Bořil	5	1	0	0	1	1	6	2
19	(Liberia)	MF	Oscar Dorley	3	1	0	0	0	0	3	1
21	(Czech Republic)	MF	David Douděra	6	1	0	0	1	0	7	1
22	(Czech Republic)	MF	Lukáš Vorlický	1	0	0	0	0	0	1	0
23	(Czech Republic)	MF	Michal Sadílek	6	0	0	0	0	0	6	0
25	(Czech Republic)	FW	Tomáš Chorý	3	3	0	0	1	0	4	3
26	(Slovakia)	FW	Ivan Schranz	1	0	0	0	1	0	2	0
27	(Czech Republic)	DF	Tomáš Vlček	3	1	0	0	0	0	3	1
31	(Slovakia)	FW	Erik Prekop	2	0	0	0	1	0	3	0
33	(Czech Republic)	DF	Ondřej Zmrzlý	1	0	0	0	0	0	1	0
36	(Czech Republic)	GK	Jindřich Staněk	1	0	0	0	0	0	1	0
Slavia Prague B Players:
Players away on loan:
8	(Japan)	DF	Daiki Hashioka	0	0	1	0	0	0	1	0
14	(Czech Republic)	MF	Tomas Jelinek	0	0	1	0	0	0	1	0
15	(Liberia)	DF	Emmanuel Fully	0	0	1	0	0	0	1	0
Players who left Slavia Prague during the season:
10	(Greece)	MF	Christos Zafeiris	2	0	0	0	1	0	3	0
			TOTALS	62	8	5	0	15	1	82	9
