= Vlček =

Vlček (feminine: Vlčková) is a Czech surname. It is a diminutive form of vlk and Vlk, meaning 'little wolf' or 'little person named Vlk'. Notable people with the surname include:

- Erik Vlček (born 1981), Slovak canoer
- Jaroslav Vlček (footballer) (1900–1967), Czech footballer
- Jaroslav Vlček (politician) (born 1952), Czech politician
- Jiri Vlcek (born 1978), Czech-Italian rower
- Josef Vlček (1900–1970), Czech footballer
- Ladislav Vlček (born 1981), Czech ice hockey player
- Lukáš Vlček (born 1982), Czech politician and businessman
- Miloslav Vlček (born 1961), Czech politician
- Petr Vlček (born 1973), Czech footballer
- Stanislav Vlček (born 1976), Czech footballer
- Tomáš Vlček (born 2001), Czech footballer
