= Jaroslav Vlček =

Jaroslav Vlček may refer to:

- Jaroslav Vlček (literary historian) (1860–1930), Czechoslovak literary historian
- Jaroslav Vlček (politician) (born 1952), Czech politician
- Jaroslav Vlček (footballer) (1900–1967), Czech footballer
- Jaroslav Vlček (referee) (1904–1970), Czechoslovak football referee
