= Youssoupha Mbodji =

Senegalese footballer

Personal information
- Full name: El Hadji Youssoupha Mbodji
- Date of birth: 9 January 2004 (age 22)
- Place of birth: Kunkujang, Gambia
- Height: 1.90 m (6 ft 3 in)
- Position: Left-back

Team information
- Current team: Zulte Waregem (on loan from Slavia Prague)

Youth career
- PSG Academy Senegal
- ASC Doolé
- ASC Aspa
- Thonon Evian

Senior career*
Years	Team	Apps	(Gls)
2025	Vysočina Jihlava	6	(1)
2025–	Slavia Prague	10	(0)
2026–	→ Zulte Waregem (loan)	2	(0)
- * Club domestic league appearances and goals as of 2 October 2026

El Hadji Youssoupha Mbodji (born 9 January 2004) is a Senegalese professional footballer who plays as a left-back for Zulte Waregem on loan from Czech First League club Slavia Prague.

== Life ==
Mbodji was born in Kunkujang, Gambia, but was raised in Senegal and has only Senegalese citizenship.

== Club career ==
Mbodji is a product of the youth academies of the Senegalese clubs PSG Academy Senegal, ASC Doolé, and ASC Aspa, before moving to the French club Thonon Evian to finish his development. In January 2025, he transferred to the Czech National Football League club Vysočina Jihlava where he signed his first professional contract. On 20 August 2025, he transferred to the Czech First League club Slavia Prague on a five-year contract. He made his professional debut with Slavia Prague in a 3–1 Czech First League win over MFK Karviná on 13 September 2023. He scored a brace on his UEFA Champions League debut, a 2–2 tie with Bodø/Glimt on 17 September 2025.

On 17 August 2026, Mbodji joined Zulte Waregem on a one-year loan deal without an option to make the transfer permanent.

== Career statistics ==
As of match played 24 May 2026

Appearances and goals by club, season and competition
Club	Season	League			Czech Cup		Europe		Other		Total	
Club	Season	Division	Apps	Goals	Apps	Goals	Apps	Goals	Apps	Goals	Apps	Goals
Vysočina Jihlava	2025–26	Czech National Football League	6	1	—		—		—		6	1
Slavia Prague	2025–26	Czech First League	10	0	1	1	7 (Note: Appearances in UEFA Champions League)	2	—		18	3
Career total			16	1	1	1	7	2	0	0	24	4

== Honours ==
Slavia Prague

- Czech First League: 2025–26
