= VLK =

VLK may refer to:

- Vlk, a Czechoslovak surname
- Volume license key, a type of product activation key
- Vladivostok Air, a Russian airline
- Villivakkam railway station, Chennai, Tamil Nadu, India (station code)
