= Youssoupha Sanyang =

Gambian footballer

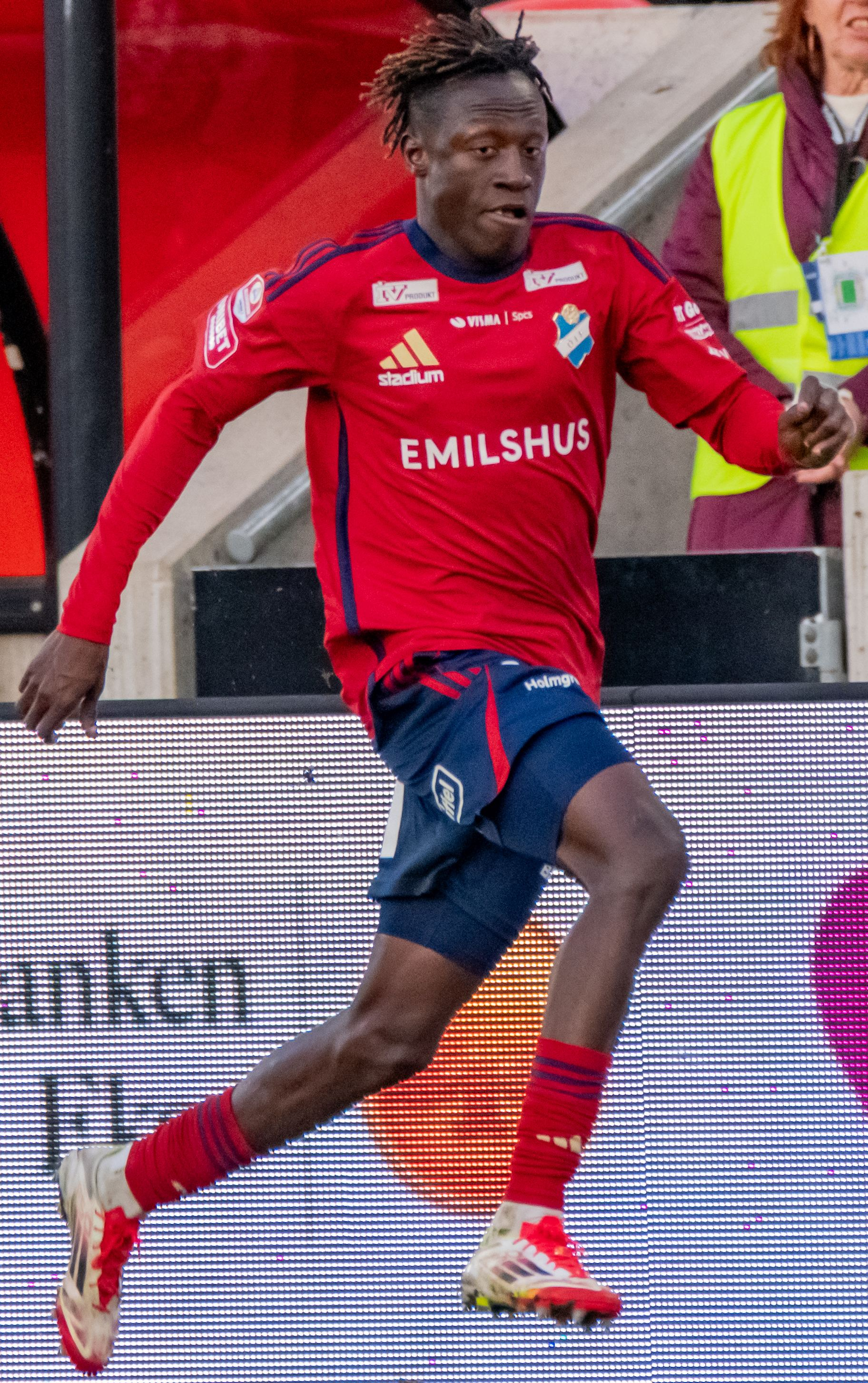
- Sanyang in 2025

Personal information
- Date of birth: 31 August 2005 (age 21)
- Place of birth: Kunkujang, The Gambia
- Height: 1.75 m (5 ft 9 in)
- Position: Winger

Team information
- Current team: Artis Brno (on loan from Slavia Prague)

Youth career
- Cayor Foot
- Teungueth

Senior career*
Years	Team	Apps	(Gls)
2022–2024	Teungueth		
2024	→ Västerås (loan)	6	(0)
2024–2025	Öster	10	(0)
2025–	Slavia Prague B	2	(0)
2025–	Slavia Prague	12	(1)
2026–	→ Artis Brno (loan)	0	(0)

International career^{‡}
2024	Senegal U20	4	(0)
2025–	Gambia	3	(0)
- * Club domestic league appearances and goals as of 20:00, 15 May 2026 (UTC) ‡ National team caps and goals as of 17:03, 15 May 2026 (UTC)

Youssoupha Sanyang (born 31 August 2005) is a Gambian professional footballer who plays as a winger for Czech First League club Artis Brno on loan from Slavia Prague and the Gambia national team.

== Club career ==
A youth product of the Senegalese clubs Cayor Foot and Teungueth, Sanyang began his senior career with Teungueth in the Senegal Ligue 1 in 2023, helping the club win the tournament in his debut season. He joined Västeråson loan in the Allsvenskan on 28 August 2024 for the remainder of the season. On 30 November 2024, he transferred to Öster on a contract until 2028. On 6 June 2025, he transferred to the Czech First League club Slavia Prague on a contract until 2030.

On 8 September 2026, Sanyang joined Czech First League club Artis Brno on a loan deal until the end of the season.

== International career ==
Sanyang was born in The Gambia to Senegalese parents and holds dual Gambian-Senegalese citizenship. He was called up to the Senegal U20s for the 2023 African Games. In June 2025, he switched to compete for Gambia and was called up to The Gambia national team for a set of friendlies.

== Career statistics ==
=== Club ===
As of match played 2 May 2026

Appearances and goals by club, season and competition
Club	Season	League			National cup (Note: Includes Svenska Cupen, Czech Cup)		Europe		Other		Total	
Club	Season	Division	Apps	Goals	Apps	Goals	Apps	Goals	Apps	Goals	Apps	Goals
Teungueth	2022–23	—			—		—		—		—	
Västerås (loan)	2024	Allsvenskan	6	0	0	0	—		—		6	0
Öster	2025	Allsvenskan	10	0	1	0	—		—		11	0
Slavia Prague B	2025–26	Czech National Football League	2	0	—		—		—		2	0
Slavia Prague	2025–26	Czech First League	12	1	2	0	6 (Note: Appearances in UEFA Champions League)	0	—		20	1
career total			30	1	3	0	6	0	0	0	39	1

=== International ===
As of match played 31 March 2026

Appearances and goals by national team and year
National team	Year	Apps	Goals
Gambia	2025	2	0
Gambia	2026	1	0
Total		3	0

== Honours ==
Teungueth

- Senegal Ligue 1: 2023–24
- Senegalese Super Cup: 2023

Slavia Prague

- Czech First League: 2025–26
