= Boubou Diallo =

Malian footballer (born 2003)

Personal information
- Date of birth: 4 November 2003 (age 23)
- Place of birth: Mali
- Height: 2.00 m (6 ft 7 in)
- Position: Forward

Team information
- Current team: Dukla Prague
- Number: 30

Youth career
- Africa Foot

Senior career*
Years	Team	Apps	(Gls)
2022–2024	SL 16	22	(0)
2023	→ Inter Turku (loan)	10	(0)
2025	Daugavpils	24	(7)
2025–	Dukla Prague	10	(0)

International career^{‡}
- Mali U23
- * Club domestic league appearances and goals as of 15 May 2026 ‡ National team caps and goals as of 4 November 2023

Boubou Diallo (born 4 November 2003) is a Malian professional football player who plays as a forward for Czech First League club Dukla Prague.

== Career ==
In August 2023, Diallo was loaned out to Finnish Veikkausliiga club Inter Turku from Belgian Standard Liège organisation for the remainder of the season.

On 8 September 2025, Diallo signed a multi-year contract with Czech First League club Dukla Prague.

== Career statistics ==
As of 8 September 2025

Appearances and goals by club, season and competition
Club	Season	League			National cup		Continental		Total	
Club	Season	Division	Apps	Goals	Apps	Goals	Apps	Goals	Apps	Goals
SL 16	2022–23	Challenger Pro League	22	0	0	0	–		22	0
SL 16	2023–24	Challenger Pro League	0	0	0	0	–		0	0
SL 16	Total		22	0	0	0	0	0	22	0
Inter Turku (loan)	2023	Veikkausliiga	10	0	0	0	–		10	0
Daugavpils	2025	Virslīga	24	7	2	3	2 (Note: Appearances in UEFA Conference League)	1	28	11
Dukla Prague	2025–26	Czech First League	0	0	0	0	–		0	0
Career total			56	7	2	3	2	1	60	11
