= Mojmír Chytil =

Czech footballer (born 1999)

- Chytil in 2026

Personal information
- Date of birth: 29 April 1999 (age 27)
- Place of birth: Skalka, Czech Republic
- Height: 1.87 m (6 ft 2 in)
- Position: Forward

Team information
- Current team: Slavia Prague
- Number: 13

Youth career
- 2006–2010: 1. SK Prostějov
- 2010–2018: Sigma Olomouc

Senior career*
Years	Team	Apps	(Gls)
2018–2023	Sigma Olomouc	100	(20)
2019–2021	Sigma Olomouc B	18	(9)
2021	→ Pardubice (loan)	16	(5)
2023–	Slavia Prague	104	(45)

International career^{‡}
2015	Czech Republic U17	2	(1)
2019	Czech Republic U20	2	(0)
2022–	Czech Republic	23	(6)
- * Club domestic league appearances and goals as of 22 November 2026 ‡ National team caps and goals as of 11 June 2026

Mojmír Chytil (born 29 April 1999) is a Czech professional footballer who plays as a forward for Slavia Prague and the Czech Republic national team.

== Early life ==
Chytil was born in Skalka in the Olomouc Region.

== Club career ==
=== Sigma Olomouc ===
Chytil made his professional debut for Sigma Olomouc in 2018. He was sent on loan to Pardubice during the 2021–22 Czech First League, scoring five goals. This loan caused then-coach of Sigma Olomouc Jiří Krejčí to regret Chytil's departure. In the 2022–23 Czech First League season, Chytil helped Sigma Olomouc to finish sixth place.

=== Slavia Prague ===
Chytil signed for Slavia Prague at the end of May 2023, signing a contract until June 2027. He scored on his debut for the club, a 2–0 win against Hradec Králové, in the first game of the 2023–24 Czech First League. A week later, Chytil set up Slavia's second goal, and scored their third, in a 3–1 win against České Budějovice. Following his strong start to the season, Chytil was named the league's Player of the Month for July 2023, voted for by fans.

== International career ==
Having represented the Czech Republic at under-17 and under-20 level, Chytil received his first call-up to the Czech Republic senior squad in November 2022. He debuted with a hat-trick in a UEFA Euro 2024 qualifying against the Faroe Islands, ending in a 5–1 victory for the Czechs.

On 20 June 2023, Chytil scored in a 4–1 friendly victory over Montenegro. Later that September, he assisted the decisive goal in a 1-1 friendly draw against Hungary.

On 29 May 2024, Chytil was included in the final 26-man Czech squad of the UEFA Euro 2024 which would occur in June. Prior to the tournament, he played preparatory friendly matches against Malta and North Macedonia, scoring another brace in a thrashing 7–1 victory against the former opponent.

On 31 May 2026, Chytil was selected in the 26-man squad for the 2026 FIFA World Cup.

== Career statistics ==
=== Club ===
As of match played 31 October 2026

Appearances and goals by club, season and competition
Club	Season	League			Czech Cup		Europe		Total	
Club	Season	Division	Apps	Goals	Apps	Goals	Apps	Goals	Apps	Goals
Sigma Olomouc	2018–19	Czech First League	4	0	0	0	—		4	0
Sigma Olomouc	2019–20	Czech First League	18	1	3	1	—		21	2
Sigma Olomouc	2020–21	Czech First League	31	4	3	0	—		34	4
Sigma Olomouc	2021–22	Czech First League	13	3	1	0	—		14	3
Sigma Olomouc	2022–23	Czech First League	34	12	3	3	—		37	15
Sigma Olomouc	Total		100	20	10	4	—		110	24
Sigma Olomouc B	2019–20	Moravian-Silesian Football League	14	8	—		—		14	8
Sigma Olomouc B	2020–21	Moravian-Silesian Football League	3	0	—		—		3	0
Sigma Olomouc B	2021–22	Moravian-Silesian Football League	1	1	—		—		1	1
Sigma Olomouc B	Total		18	9	—		—		18	9
Pardubice (loan)	2021–22	Czech First League	16	5	2	0	—		18	5
Slavia Prague	2023–24	Czech First League	34	16	3	1	10 (Note: Appearances in UEFA Europa League)	4	47	21
Slavia Prague	2024–25	Czech First League	29	9	2	2	11 (Note: Three appearances in UEFA Champions League, eight appearances and one goal in UEFA Europa League)	1	42	12
Slavia Prague	2025–26	Czech First League	28	13	2	1	6 (Note: Appearances in UEFA Champions League)	0	36	14
Slavia Prague	2026–27	Czech First League	11	4	1	0	3	0	15	4
Slavia Prague	Total		102	42	8	4	30	5	140	51
Career total			236	76	20	8	30	5	286	89

=== International ===
As of match played 11 June 2026

Appearances and goals by national team and year
National team	Year	Apps	Goals
Czech Republic	2022	2	3
Czech Republic	2023	9	1
Czech Republic	2024	7	2
Czech Republic	2025	1	0
Czech Republic	2026	4	0
Total		23	6

Scores and results list the Czech Republic's goal tally first, score column indicates score after each Chytil goal.

List of international goals scored by Mojmír Chytil
No.	Date	Venue	Opponent	Score	Result	Competition
1	16 November 2022	Andrův stadion, Olomouc, Czech Republic	Faroe Islands	1–0	5–0	Friendly
2	16 November 2022	Andrův stadion, Olomouc, Czech Republic	Faroe Islands	2–0	5–0	Friendly
3	16 November 2022	Andrův stadion, Olomouc, Czech Republic	Faroe Islands	3–0	5–0	Friendly
4	20 June 2023	City Stadium, Podgorica, Montenegro	Montenegro	1–0	4–1	Friendly
5	7 June 2024	Untersberg-Arena, Grödig, Austria	Malta	2–0	7–1	Friendly
6	7 June 2024	Untersberg-Arena, Grödig, Austria	Malta	4–0	7–1	Friendly

== Honours ==
Slavia Prague

- Czech First League: 2024–25, 2025–26
