= David Jurásek =

Czech footballer (born 2000)

- Jurásek in 2026

Personal information
- Date of birth: 7 August 2000 (age 26)
- Place of birth: Uherské Hradiště, Czech Republic
- Height: 1.83 m (6 ft 0 in)
- Position: Left-back

Team information
- Current team: Slavia Prague
- Number: 39

Youth career
- 2007−2009: Dolní Němčí
- 2009–2015: Slovácko
- 2015–2020: Zbrojovka Brno

Senior career*
Years	Team	Apps	(Gls)
2020	Zbrojovka Brno	6	(0)
2020−2021	Prostějov	25	(3)
2021−2022	Mladá Boleslav	15	(1)
2022–2023	Slavia Prague	42	(3)
2022	Slavia Prague B	1	(0)
2023–2026	Benfica	6	(0)
2024–2025	→ TSG Hoffenheim (loan)	27	(0)
2025–2026	→ Beşiktaş (loan)	10	(0)
2026–	Slavia Prague	21	(3)

International career^{‡}
2017	Czech Republic U17	1	(0)
2021–	Czech Republic U21	3	(0)
2023–	Czech Republic	19	(1)
- * Club domestic league appearances and goals as of 08:50, 9 November 2026 (UTC) ‡ National team caps and goals as of 12 November 2026

David Jurásek (born 7 August 2000) is a Czech professional footballer who plays as a left-back for Czech First League club Slavia Prague. He also represents the Czech Republic national team.

== Club career ==
=== Early career ===
Jurásek began his career in the academy at Dolní Němčí, later moving to Slovácko and then to Zbrojovka Brno.

He made his professional debut for Zbrojovka Brno in a 0–0 draw against Dukla Prague on 1 July 2020, replacing Ondřej Vaněk as a substitute in the final minute. After six Czech National Football League appearances for the club, Jurásek signed for Prostějov in July 2020. At Prostějov, Jurásek made 25 league appearances, scoring three times, before signing for Czech First League club Mladá Boleslav in July 2021. Upon joining Mladá Boleslav, Jurásek told Prostějov-based newspaper Prostějovský Večerník that his time in the second tier with Prostějov had been instrumental in earning a move to Mladá Boleslav. On 21 August 2021, Jurásek made his debut in the Czech First League, starting in a 3–1 win against Teplice.

=== Slavia Prague ===
On 10 February 2022, following one goal and two assists in 15 league games, Slavia Prague announced Jurásek and fellow Mladá Boleslav teammate Daniel Fila had signed for the club, with the pair both signing contracts until June 2026.

=== Benfica ===
On 10 July 2023, Jurásek signed a five-year contract with Portuguese side Benfica, in a deal totalling €14 million. His release clause was set at €80 million. He made his debut for the club on 9 August, in the Supertaça Cândido de Oliveira coming off the bench to replace Mihailo Ristić at half-time in a 2–0 win over rivals Porto. Five days later, Jurásek made his first start for Benfica and Primeira Liga debut in a 3–2 loss away at Boavista. At the end of the match, he suffered an ankle injury and got subsequently sidelined for a month. Jurásek made his UEFA Champions League debut on 3 October 2023, coming on as a substitute in the 79th minute of a 1–0 loss away at Inter Milan, in the competition's group stage.

==== TSG Hoffenheim (loan) ====
On 22 January 2024, Benfica sent Jurásek on loan to Bundesliga club TSG Hoffenheim until the end of the season, with an optional buy-clause reported to be €11 million, which could rise to €12 million with add-ons. Later that year, on 1 July, he extended his loan contract for another year.

==== Beşiktaş (loan) ====
On 29 June 2025, Jurásek was loaned to Turkish side Beşiktaş until the end of the season with an option to purchase clause. However, in January 2026, having made 17 appearances for the Istanbul-based club, his loan was terminated.

=== Return to Slavia Prague ===
On 12 January 2026, Jurásek permanently left Benfica, returning to Slavia Prague, where he signed a contract until June 2029, for a reported fee of €3 million.

== International career ==
On 4 April 2017, Jurásek made his debut for the Czech Republic's under-17 side, playing in a 4–1 win against Belgium. Four years later, he earned his second youth cap for the Czech Republic, representing the under-21 team in a 3–0 victory against Kosovo.

On 24 March 2023, Jurásek debuted for the Czech senior team in UEFA Euro 2024 qualifying match against Poland. He scored his first goal in a preparatory friendly match against Malta on 8 June 2024, which ended in a 7–1 victory for the Czechs.

On 28 May 2024, he was selected in the 26-man squad for the UEFA Euro 2024.

On 31 May 2026 Jurásek was selected in the 26-man squad for the 2026 FIFA World Cup.

== Career statistics ==
=== Club ===
As of match played 24 October 2026

Appearances and goals by club, season and competition
Club	Season	League			National cup (Note: Includes Czech Cup, Taça de Portugal, DFB-Pokal, Turkish Cup)		League cup (Note: Includes Taça da Liga)		Continental		Other		Total	
Club	Season	Division	Apps	Goals	Apps	Goals	Apps	Goals	Apps	Goals	Apps	Goals	Apps	Goals
Zbrojovka Brno	2019–20	Czech National League	6	0	—		—		—		—		6	0
Prostějov	2020–21	Czech National League	25	3	1	0	—		—		—		26	3
Mladá Boleslav	2021–22	Czech First League	15	1	2	2	—		—		—		17	3
Slavia Prague	2021–22	Czech First League	11	1	—		—		—		—		11	1
Slavia Prague	2022–23	Czech First League	31	2	5	0	—		8 (Note: Appearances in UEFA Europa Conference League)	0	—		44	2
Slavia Prague	Total		42	3	5	0	—		8	0	0	0	55	3
Slavia Prague B	2022–23	Czech National League	1	0	—		—		—		—		1	0
Benfica	2023–24	Primeira Liga	6	0	1	0	1	0	3 (Note: Appearances in UEFA Champions League)	0	1 (Note: Appearance in Supertaça Cândido de Oliveira)	0	12	0
TSG Hoffenheim (loan)	2023–24	Bundesliga	13	0	—		—		—		—		13	0
TSG Hoffenheim (loan)	2024–25	Bundesliga	14	0	2	0	—		5 (Note: Appearances in UEFA Europa League)	0	—		21	0
TSG Hoffenheim (loan)	Total		27	0	2	0	—		5	0	—		34	0
Beşiktaş (loan)	2025–26	Süper Lig	10	0	1	0	—		6 (Note: Two appearances in UEFA Europa League, four appearances in UEFA Conference League)	0	—		17	0
Slavia Prague	2025–26	Czech First League	15	1	1	0	—		—		—		16	1
Slavia Prague	2026–27	Czech First League	4	1	1	1	—		1	0	—		6	2
Slavia Prague	Total		19	2	2	1	—		1	0	—		22	3
Career total			149	9	14	3	1	0	23	0	1	0	188	12

=== International ===
As of match played 12 November 2026

Appearances and goals by national team and year
National team	Year	Apps	Goals
Czech Republic	2023	5	0
Czech Republic	2024	6	1
Czech Republic	2025	4	0
Czech Republic	2026	4	0
Total		19	1

Scores and results list Czech Republic's goal tally first, score column indicates score after each Jurásek goal.

List of international goals scored by David Jurásek
No.	Date	Venue	Opponent	Score	Result	Competition
1.	7 June 2024	Untersberg-Arena, Grödig, Austria	Malta	3–0	7–1	Friendly

== Honours ==
Benfica

- Supertaça Cândido de Oliveira: 2023

Slavia Prague

- Czech First League: 2025–26

Individual

- Czech First League Newcomer of the Season: 2021–22
