= Tomáš Vlček =

Czech footballer (born 1001)

- Vlček in 2026

Personal information
- Date of birth: 28 February 2001 (age 25)
- Place of birth: Kladno, Czech Republic
- Height: 1.81 m (5 ft 11 in)
- Position: Centre-back

Team information
- Current team: Slavia Prague
- Number: 27

Youth career
- 2008–2009: TJ Novoměstský Kladno
- 2009–2011: Kladno
- 2011–2019: Slavia Prague

Senior career*
| Years | Team | Apps | (Gls) |
| 2019–2025 | Slavia Prague B | 10 | (0) |
| 2019– | Slavia Prague | 53 | (1) |
| 2019 | → Ústí nad Labem (loan) | 7 | (0) |
| 2020–2022 | → Vysočina Jihlava (loan) | 55 | (1) |
| 2022–2023 | → Pardubice (loan) | 32 | (1) |

International career^{‡}
| 2017–2018 | Czech Republic U17 | 6 | (0) |
| 2018–2019 | Czech Republic U18 | 9 | (0) |
| 2019–2020 | Czech Republic U19 | 11 | (1) |
| 2021–2022 | Czech Republic U20 | 6 | (0) |
| 2022–2023 | Czech Republic U21 | 4 | (0) |
| 2024– | Czech Republic | 4 | (0) |
- * Club domestic league appearances and goals as of 31 October 2026 ‡ National team caps and goals as of 15 November 2026

Tomáš Vlček (born 28 February 2001) is a Czech professional footballer who plays as a centre-back for Czech First League club Slavia Prague and the Czech Republic national team.

== International career ==
Having represented Czech Republic at the 2023 UEFA European Under-21 Championship, Vlček debuted for the Czech Republic senior side on 26 March 2024 in a friendly match against Armenia.

== Career statistics ==
=== Club ===
As of 31 October 2026

Appearances and goals by club, season and competition
| Club | Season | League | | | Czech Cup | | Europe | | Other | | Total | |
| Club | Season | Division | Apps | Goals | Apps | Goals | Apps | Goals | Apps | Goals | Apps | Goals |
|---|---|---|---|---|---|---|---|---|---|---|---|---|
| Slavia Prague B | 2018–19 | Czech National Football League | 6 | 0 | — | | — | | — | | 6 | 0 |
| Slavia Prague B | 2019–20 | Czech National Football League | 1 | 0 | — | | — | | — | | 1 | 0 |
| Slavia Prague B | 2023–24 | Czech National Football League | 1 | 0 | — | | — | | — | | 1 | 0 |
| Slavia Prague B | 2024–25 | Czech National Football League | 2 | 0 | — | | — | | — | | 2 | 0 |
| Slavia Prague B | 2025–26 | Czech National Football League | 1 | 0 | — | | — | | — | | 1 | 0 |
| Slavia Prague B | Total | | 10 | 0 | — | | — | | — | | 10 | 0 |
| Slavia Prague | 2018–19 | Czech First League | 0 | 0 | 2 | 0 | 0 | 0 | — | | 2 | 0 |
| Slavia Prague | 2023–24 | Czech First League | 22 | 0 | 3 | 0 | 8 (Note: Appearances in UEFA Europa League) | 0 | — | | 33 | 0 |
| Slavia Prague | 2024–25 | Czech First League | 7 | 0 | 1 | 0 | 0 | 0 | — | | 8 | 0 |
| Slavia Prague | 2025–26 | Czech First League | 15 | 1 | 3 | 0 | 5 (Note: Appearances in UEFA Champions League) | 0 | — | | 23 | 1 |
| Slavia Prague | 2026–27 | Czech First League | 9 | 0 | 1 | 0 | 3 | 0 | — | | 13 | 0 |
| Slavia Prague | Total | | 53 | 1 | 10 | 0 | 16 | 0 | 0 | 0 | 79 | 1 |
| Ústí nad Labem (loan) | 2019–20 | Czech National Football League | 7 | 0 | 2 | 0 | — | | — | | 9 | 0 |
| Vysočina Jihlava (loan) | 2020–21 | Czech National Football League | 26 | 0 | 3 | 0 | — | | — | | 29 | 0 |
| Vysočina Jihlava (loan) | 2021–22 | Czech National Football League | 29 | 1 | 3 | 0 | — | | — | | 32 | 1 |
| Vysočina Jihlava (loan) | Total | | 55 | 1 | 6 | 0 | — | | — | | 61 | 1 |
| Pardubice (loan) | 2022–23 | Czech First League | 34 | 1 | 1 | 0 | — | | — | | 35 | 1 |
| Career total | | | 162 | 3 | 19 | 0 | 16 | 0 | 0 | 0 | 196 | 3 |

=== International ===
As of match played 15 November 2026

Appearances and goals by national team and year
| National team | Year | Apps | Goals |
|---|---|---|---|
| Czech Republic | 2024 | 2 | 0 |
| Czech Republic | 2025 | 0 | 0 |
| Czech Republic | 2026 | 2 | 0 |
| Total | | 4 | 0 |

== Honours ==
Slavia Prague

- Czech First League: 2024–25, 2025–26
- Czech Cup: 2018–19
