= Dominik Javorček =

Slovak footballer

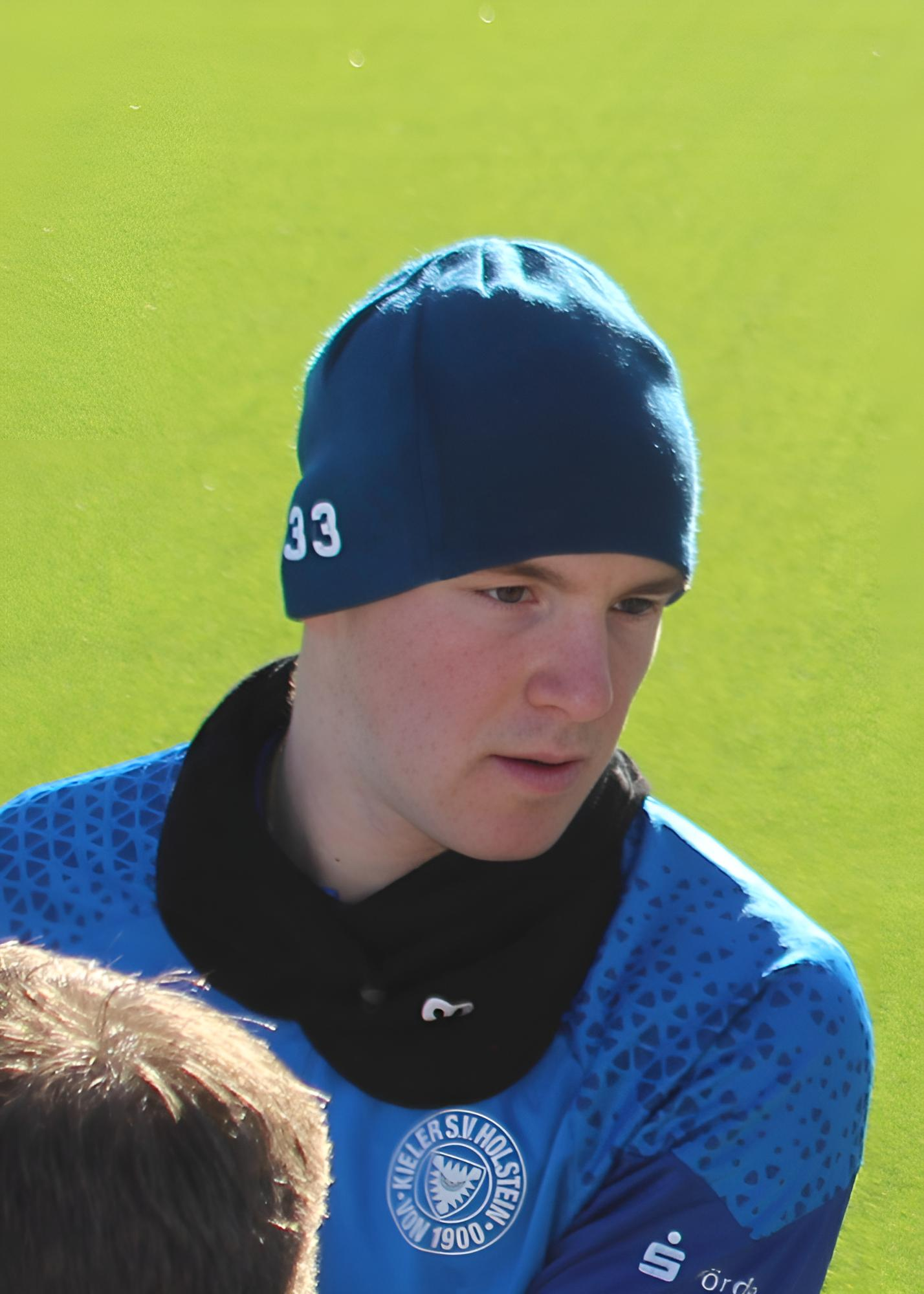
- Javorček with Holstein Kiel in 2025

Personal information
- Date of birth: 2 November 2002 (age 24)
- Place of birth: Bojnice, Slovakia
- Height: 1.83 m (6 ft 0 in)
- Position: Left-back

Team information
- Current team: Slavia Prague
- Number: 37

Youth career
- 2009–2011: TJ Športklub Liešťany
- 2009–2010: → FK Diviaky nad Nitricou (loan)
- 2011–2015: Baník Prievidza
- 2015–2020: Žilina

Senior career*
Years	Team	Apps	(Gls)
2020–2023	Žilina B	20	(1)
2020–2025	Žilina	64	(5)
2024–2025	→ Holstein Kiel (loan)	13	(0)
2025	→ Holsten Kiel II (loan)	5	(0)
2025–	Slavia Prague	1	(0)

International career
2018–2019	Slovakia U17	6	(0)
2019–2020	Slovakia U18	4	(0)
2021	Slovakia U19	1	(0)
2021–2025	Slovakia U21	24	(2)
- * Club domestic league appearances and goals as of 24 May 2026

Dominik Javorček (born 2 November 2002) is a Slovak professional footballer who plays as a left-back for Czech First League club Slavia Prague.

== Club career ==
Javorček made his Slovak Super Liga debut for Žilina against AS Trenčín at pod Dubňom on 15 August 2020. He appeared directly in the starting XI. He was booked with a yellow card in the 68th minute and was replaced by Jakub Kiwior eight minutes later with the score at 3–2 in favour of Šošoni. Vahan Bichakhchyan sealed a 4–2 win in stoppage time. He scored his first Fortuna Liga goal in an away defeat to Spartak Trnava.

On 30 August 2024, Javorček joined Holstein Kiel in Germany on loan.

On 9 June 2025, Javorček signed a contract with Czech First League club Slavia Prague until 2029.

== Career statistics ==
As of match played 24 May 2026

Appearances and goals by club, season and competition
Club	Season	League			National cup (Note: Includes Slovak Cup)		Continental		Other		Total	
Club	Season	Division	Apps	Goals	Apps	Goals	Apps	Goals	Apps	Goals	Apps	Goals
Žilina B	2019–20	Slovak 2. Liga	3	1	—		—		—		3	1
Žilina B	2020–21	Slovak 2. Liga	12	0	—		—		—		12	0
Žilina B	2021–22	Slovak 2. Liga	3	0	—		—		—		3	0
Žilina B	2022–23	Slovak 2. Liga	2	0	—		—		—		2	0
Žilina B	Total		20	1	—		—		—		20	1
Žilina	2020–21	Slovak 1. Liga	16	1	4	0	0	0	—		20	1
Žilina	2021–22	Slovak 1. Liga	2	0	1	0	0	0	—		3	0
Žilina	2022–23	Slovak 1. Liga	12	2	0	0	—		—		12	2
Žilina	2023–24	Slovak 1. Liga	32	1	2	1	3 (Note: Appearance(s) in UEFA Europa Conference League)	0	—		37	2
Žilina	2024–25	Slovak 1. Liga	2	1	0	0	—		—		2	1
Žilina	Total		64	5	7	1	3	0	—		74	6
Holstein Kiel (loan)	2024–25	Bundesliga	13	0	0	0	—		—		13	0
Holsten Kiel II (loan)	2024–25	Regionalliga Nord	5	0	—		—		—		5	0
Slavia Prague	2025–26	Serbian SuperLiga	1	0	0	0	0	0	—		1	0
Career total			104	6	7	1	3	0	—		113	7
