= Ondřej Zmrzlý =

Czech footballer (born 1999)

Personal information
- Date of birth: 22 April 1999 (age 27)
- Place of birth: Czech Republic
- Height: 1.85 m (6 ft 1 in)
- Position: Left-back

Team information
- Current team: Górnik Zabrze
- Number: 21

Youth career
- SK Bělkovice-Lašťany
- Sigma Olomouc

Senior career*
Years	Team	Apps	(Gls)
2019–2024	Sigma Olomouc	128	(12)
2019–2023	Sigma Olomouc B	11	(4)
2024–2026	Slavia Prague	39	(4)
2026	→ Górnik Zabrze (loan)	10	(0)
2026–	Górnik Zabrze	13	(1)

International career^{‡}
2014	Czech Republic U16	4	(0)
2019	Czech Republic U20	5	(0)
2022–	Czech Republic	4	(0)
- * Club domestic league appearances and goals as of 13:17, 7 November 2026 (UTC) ‡ National team caps and goals as of 09:22, 7 October 2026 (UTC)

Ondřej Zmrzlý (born 22 April 1999) is a Czech professional footballer who plays as a left-back for Ekstraklasa club Górnik Zabrze and the Czech Republic national team.

== Club career ==
Zmrzlý played for the youth team of Sigma Olomouc, with which he also played in the 2018–19 UEFA Youth League. He made his senior league debut for Sigma Olomouc on 13 July 2019 in their Czech First League 3–1 away loss against Viktoria Plzeň. On 23 August 2019, he made his debut in the starting lineup in Sigma's 2–0 win against Teplice. Since then, he has played over 100 matches for Sigma.

On 5 January 2024, Zmrzlý signed a contract with Slavia Prague until June 2027.

On 25 February 2026, Zmrzlý joined Polish Ekstraklasa club Górnik Zabrze on loan for the rest of the season, with an option to buy. On 17 June 2026, Górnik triggered their buy option and signed Zmrzlý to a three-year deal.

== International career ==
Zmrzlý played several matches for the Czech U16 and U20 youth teams. On 16 September 2022, he made his senior national team debut when he played the second half of a friendly match against the Faroe Islands, which the Czech team won 5–0.

== Player profile ==
=== Style of play ===
He is a left-footed player. He started his career as a defensive midfielder, but more often plays as a left-back. He is appreciated for his versatility.

== Career statistics ==
=== Club ===
As of match played 19 September 2026

Appearances and goals by club, season and competition
Club	Season	League			National cup (Note: Includes Czech Cup, Polish Cup)		Continental		Other		Total	
Club	Season	Division	Apps	Goals	Apps	Goals	Apps	Goals	Apps	Goals	Apps	Goals
Sigma Olomouc	2018–19	Czech First League	0	0	1	0	—		—		1	0
Sigma Olomouc	2019–20	Czech First League	19	0	2	2	—		—		21	2
Sigma Olomouc	2020–21	Czech First League	24	2	2	0	—		—		24	5
Sigma Olomouc	2021–22	Czech First League	33	5	4	2	—		—		37	7
Sigma Olomouc	2022–23	Czech First League	34	2	3	1	—		—		37	3
Sigma Olomouc	2023–24	Czech First League	18	3	2	0	—		—		20	3
Sigma Olomouc	Total		128	12	14	5	—		—		142	17
Slavia Prague	2023–24	Czech First League	12	3	0	0	2 (Note: Appearances in UEFA Europa League)	0	—		14	3
Slavia Prague	2024–25	Czech First League	16	1	3	0	6	0	—		25	1
Slavia Prague	2025–26	Czech First League	11	0	2	1	0	0	—		13	1
Slavia Prague	Total		39	4	5	1	8	0	—		52	5
Górnik Zabrze (loan)	2025–26	Ekstraklasa	10	0	2	0	—		—		12	0
Górnik Zabrze	2026–27	Ekstraklasa	8	0	0	0	3 (Note: One appearance in UEFA Champions League, one appearance in UEFA Europa League, one appearance in UEFA Conference League)	0	1 (Note: Appearance in Polish Super Cup)	0	12	0
Górnik Zabrze	Total		18	0	2	0	3	0	1	0	24	0
Career total			185	16	21	8	11	0	1	0	218	24

=== International ===
As of match played 6 October 2026

Appearances and goals by national team and year
National team	Year	Apps	Goals
Czech Republic	2022	1	0
Czech Republic	2024	1	0
Czech Republic	2026	2	0
Total		4	0

== Honours ==
Slavia Prague

- Czech First League: 2024–25

Górnik Zabrze

- Polish Cup: 2025–26
