= Adonija Ouanda =

Canadian soccer player

Personal information
- Full name: Adonija Bryan Govanni Ouanda
- Date of birth: 30 April 2005 (age 21)
- Place of birth: Abidjan, Ivory Coast
- Height: 1.80 m (5 ft 11 in)
- Position: Winger

Team information
- Current team: Slavia Prague
- Number: 18

Youth career
- Edmonton Warriors

Senior career*
Years	Team	Apps	(Gls)
2023–2024	Metalac	12	(0)
2024–2026	Voždovac	46	(7)
2026–	Slavia Prague	3	(1)
2026	→ Slovácko B (loan)	1	(0)
2026	→ Slovácko (loan)	11	(3)
- * Club domestic league appearances and goals as of 18 September 2026

Adonija Bryan Govanni Ouanda (born 30 April 2005) is a Canadian professional soccer player who plays as a winger for Czech First League club Slavia Prague.

== Early life ==
Ouanda was born in Abidjan, Ivory Coast, and raised in Canada. He holds Canadian citizenship. He has a younger brother, Christ-Emmanuel. During his youth, Ouanda played for the Edmonton Warriors Soccer Club, a member of the Edmonton Minor Soccer Association (EMSA).

== Career ==
Ouanda began his senior career in Serbia with Metalac Gornji Milanovac in 2023 in the Serbian First League. In 2024, he transferred to Voždovac in July 2024. On 10 October 2025, he extended his contract with Voždovac until 2028. Ouanda transferred to Czech First League club Slavia Prague, before being loaned to 1. FC Slovácko for the remainder of the 2025–26 season. He scored on his debut with Slovácko, a 2–2 league draw against Baník Ostrava on 1 February 2026. Ouanda returned to Slavia Prague for the 2026–27 season.

On 26 July 2026, Ouanda scored on his competitive debut for Slavia Prague, netting in the 35th minute of a 5–1 home win over his former club Slovácko in the opening round of the 2026–27 Czech First League season.

== Career statistics ==
As of 18 September 2026

Appearances and goals by club, season and competition
Club	Season	League			National cup		Europe		Total	
Club	Season	Division	Apps	Goals	Apps	Goals	Apps	Goals	Apps	Goals
Metalac	2023–24	Serbian First League	12	0	0	0	—		12	0
Voždovac	2024–25	Serbian First League	31	1	0	0	—		31	1
Voždovac	2025–26	Serbian First League	15	6	0	0	—		15	6
Voždovac	Total		46	7	0	0	—		46	7
Slavia Prague	2025–26	Czech First League	0	0	0	0	0	0	0	0
Slavia Prague	2026–27	Czech First League	3	1	0	0	0	0	3	1
Slavia Prague	Total		3	1	0	0	0	0	3	1
Slovácko B (loan)	2025–26	MSFL	1	0	—		—		1	0
Slovácko (loan)	2025–26	Czech First League	11	3	0	0	—		11	3
Career total			73	11	0	0	0	0	73	11
