= Matyáš Vojta =

Czech footballer (born 2004)

Personal information
- Date of birth: 26 February 2004 (age 22)
- Place of birth: Prague, Czech Republic
- Height: 1.87 m (6 ft 2 in)
- Position: Striker

Team information
- Current team: Sparta Prague
- Number: 29

Youth career
- –2019: Slavoj Vyšehrad
- 2019–2020: Slavia Prague
- 2020: Slavoj Vyšehrad

Senior career*
Years	Team	Apps	(Gls)
2020–2022	Slavoj Vyšehrad	22	(2)
2022–2025	Mladá Boleslav	44	(17)
2022–2024	→ Mladá Boleslav B	37	(16)
2024	→ Varnsdorf (loan)	13	(7)
2026–	Sparta Prague	10	(0)

International career^{‡}
2022–2023	Czech Republic U19	4	(0)
2024	Czech Republic U20	2	(0)
2025–	Czech Republic U21	8	(1)
- * Club domestic league appearances and goals as of 15 May 2026 ‡ National team caps and goals as of 25 February 2026

Matyáš Vojta (born 26 February 2004) is a Czech professional footballer who plays as a striker for Sparta Prague.

== Life ==
Matyáš Vojta was born on 26 February 2004 in Prague.

== Club career ==
Vojta was raised in Slavoj Vyšehrad, but he spent the 2019–20 season in Slavia Prague. He made his professional football debut at the age of 16, playing in the 2020–21 season of the Czech National Football League. In 2022, he transferred to the B-team of FK Mladá Boleslav.

He made his Czech First League debut for Mladá Boleslav on 2 September 2023, in their 2–0 away loss against Baník Ostrava, but it was his only match for the A-team in the season. In the 2024–25 season, he played regularly for Mladá Boleslav. He scored his first goal in the preliminary round of the conference league against TransINVEST on 1 August 2024. In the Czech First League, he scored ten goals in 26 matches and became runner-up in the Discovery of the Season award. He then scored seven goals in the first half of the 2025–26 season and became runner-up in the Talent of the Year award of the 2025 Czech Footballer of the Year poll.

On 5 January 2026, Vojta signed a contract with Sparta Prague. Sparta Prague paid to Mladá Boleslav €4 million (+ potentially €0.75 million in bonuses) for him, which at the time of the transfer was the highest amount for a transfer within the Czech First League.

== International career ==
Vojta played for the Czech Republic U19 national team in the 2022–23 season. In March 2025, he debuted for the Czech Republic U21 national team.

== Style of play ==
According to critics, at the age of 21, Vojta is a good shooter, can cover the ball and plays well in the middle of the pitch, but he lacks speed and strength in aerial duels.
