= Lukáš Vorlický =

Czech footballer

Personal information
- Date of birth: 18 January 2002 (age 24)
- Place of birth: Boskovice, Czech Republic
- Height: 1.86 m (6 ft 1 in)
- Position: Forward

Team information
- Current team: Slovácko

Youth career
- 2009–2014: Boskovice
- 2014–2017: Zbrojovka Brno
- 2017–2023: Atalanta

Senior career*
Years	Team	Apps	(Gls)
2023–2024	Atalanta	3	(0)
2024–2026	Slavia Prague	12	(2)
2024–2026	Slavia Prague B	10	(6)
2026	→ Zbrojovka Brno (loan)	4	(3)
2026–	Slovácko	0	(0)

International career
2017	Czech Republic U15	7	(1)
2017–2018	Czech Republic U16	12	(3)
2018	Czech Republic U17	3	(0)
- * Club domestic league appearances and goals as of 9 April 2026

Lukáš Vorlický (born 18 January 2002) is a Czech professional footballer who plays as a winger for Slovácko.

== Club career ==
A youth product of the Czech clubs Boskovice and Zbrojovka Brno, Vorlický moved to the youth academy of the Italian club Atalanta in 2017. On 23 July 2020, he signed a professional contract with the club until 2025. He made his professional debut with Atalanta as a late substitute in a 2–1 Serie A loss to Lecce on 19 February 2023.

On 6 February 2024, Vorlický signed a contract with Slavia Prague until June 2027; he was initially assigned to the club's reserve team.

On 8 January 2026, Vorlický joined Zbrojovka Brno on a half-year loan deal.

On 16 July 2026, Vorlický signed a three-year contract with Slovácko.

== International career ==
Vorlický is a youth international for the Czech Republic, having played up to the Czech Republic U17s.

== Personal life ==
Vorlický is the son of the Czech football manager and former player Jiří Vorlický.

== Playing style ==
Vorlický is a strong and powerful forward, with an unpredictable style of play and a strong shot. He has earned comparisons to Josip Iličić.

== Career statistics ==
As of match played 26 October 2025

Appearances and goals by club, season and competition
Club	Season	League			National cup (Note: Includes Czech Cup)		Europe		Other		Total	
Club	Season	Division	Apps	Goals	Apps	Goals	Apps	Goals	Apps	Goals	Apps	Goals
Atalanta	2022–23	Serie A	3	0	0	0	0	0	—		3	0
Slavia Prague	2024–25	Czech First League	4	0	0	0	2 (Note: Appearances in UEFA Champions League)	0	—		6	0
Slavia Prague	2025–26	Czech First League	8	2	1	0	0	0	—		9	2
Slavia Prague	Total		12	2	1	0	2	0	—		15	2
Slavia Prague B	2023–24	Czech National Football League	6	4	—		—		—		6	4
Slavia Prague B	2024–25	Czech National Football League	4	2	—		—		—		4	2
Slavia Prague B	Total		10	6	—		—		—		10	6
Career total			25	8	1	0	0	2	0	0	28	8

== Honours ==
Slavia Prague

- Czech First League: 2024–25
