= Abdallah Gning =

Senegalese footballer (born 1998)

Personal information
- Date of birth: 29 September 1998 (age 28)
- Place of birth: Senegal
- Height: 1.82 m (6 ft 0 in)
- Position: Forward

Team information
- Current team: Baník Ostrava
- Number: 12

Senior career*
Years	Team	Apps	(Gls)
–2021	Stade Mbour		
2022	Vlašim	13	(2)
2022–2025	Teplice	75	(15)
2025–2026	Karviná	19	(6)
2026–	Baník Ostrava	20	(3)
- * Club domestic league appearances and goals as of 26 October 2026

Abdallah Gning (born 29 September 1998) is a Senegalese professional footballer who plays as a forward for Baník Ostrava.

== Club career ==
Until 2021, Gning played in the Ligue 1, the top Senegalese tier. In December 2021, he transferred to Vlašim, playing in the Czech National Football League. He appeared in 13 league matches and scored two goals. After seven months in Vlašim, in the summer of 2022, he transferred to FK Teplice in the Czech First League. He began to play regularly in the club's starting lineup and became one of the discoveries of the season.

In the 2022–23 season, Gning was the best club's scorer with nine goals. In the 2023–24 season, he was hampered by injuries—first a seriously bruised knee and then a life-threatening perforated ulcer.

In the 2024–25 season, he started playing regularly for Teplice again, and Widzew Łódź showed interest in him, offering him significantly better financial conditions than Teplice. Gning and his agent wanted to force this transfer, but in the end, Gning failed the medical examination and finished the season in Teplice. During his time in Teplice, he played 75 league matches and scored 15 goals.

Before the 2025–26 season, Gning left for MFK Karviná. In January 2026, Gning signed a three-year contract with Baník Ostrava. On 29 August 2026, he broke both his fibula and his tibia with an expected recovery period of five months.
