= Louis Lurvink =

Swiss footballer (born 2002)

Personal information
- Date of birth: 24 January 2002 (age 24)
- Place of birth: Basel, Switzerland
- Height: 1.86 m (6 ft 1 in)
- Position: Defender

Team information
- Current team: Sigma Olomouc
- Number: 3

Youth career
- 2010–2020: Basel

Senior career*
Years	Team	Apps	(Gls)
2020–2022	Basel	1	(0)
2020–2022	Basel U21	30	(2)
2022–2024	Schaffhausen	70	(0)
2024–2026	Pardubice	45	(2)
2026–	Sigma Olomouc	17	(5)

International career
2019	Switzerland U18	1	(0)
- * Club domestic league appearances and goals as of 27 May 2026

Louis Lurvink (born 24 January 2002) is a Swiss footballer who plays as a defender for Sigma Olomouc.

== Club career ==
Lurvink made his professional debut with Basel in a 0–0 Swiss Super League tie with Luzern on 3 August 2020.

On 28 January 2022, Lurvink joined Schaffhausen until the end of the season, with an option to extend.

On 30 August 2024, Lurvink signed a multi-year contract with Czech First League club Pardubice.

On 6 February 2026, Lurvink signed a contract with Czech First League club Sigma Olomouc.
