= Vlk =

Vlk (feminine: Vlková) is a Czech and Slovak surname, meaning 'wolf'. Notable people with the surname include:

- František Vlk (1925–2003), Czech footballer
- Jaromír Vlk (born 1949), Czech shot putter
- Lubomír Vlk (born 1964), Czech footballer
- Miloslav Vlk (1932–2017), Czech Archbishop and cardinal
- Petr Vlk (born 1964), Czech ice hockey player
- Přemysl Vlk (1982–2003), Czech slalom canoer
- Vladimír Vlk (born 1968), Slovak ice hockey player
