= Jaroslav Vlček (footballer) =

Czech footballer

Personal information
- Date of birth: 12 February 1900
- Place of birth: Plzeň, Bohemia, Austria-Hungary
- Date of death: 4 September 1967 (aged 67)
- Place of death: Chicago, United States

International career
Years	Team	Apps	(Gls)
1922–1924	Czechoslovakia	3	(2)

Jaroslav Vlček (12 February 1900 – 4 September 1967) was a Czech footballer. He competed for Czechoslovakia in the men's tournament at the 1924 Summer Olympics. On a club level, he played for Čechie Karlín.
