= Jaroslav Vlček (politician) =

Czech politician (born 1952)

Jaroslav Vlček (born 18 September 1952) is a Czech former politician. He was the chairman of the Czech Green Party.
