= 2025–26 Czech First League =

Czech First League
- Season: 2025–26
- Dates: 18 July 2025 – 24 May 2026
- Champions: Slavia Prague (9th title)
- Relegated: Dukla Prague; Karviná (Note: On 15 June 2026, it was announced that Karviná will be administratively relegated to the Czech National Football League by the Football Association of the Czech Republic due to alleged match-fixing. The club announced that they would appeal the decision, but on 28 June 2026, after the 2025–26 season formally ended and the 2026–27 season began, the club decided to withdraw its appeal and leave the league.)
- Champions League: Slavia Prague; Sparta Prague
- Europa League: Viktoria Plzeň; Hradec Králové
- Conference League: Jablonec
- Matches: 276
- Goals: 721 (2.61 per match)
- Top goalscorer: Tomáš Chorý (17 goals)
- Biggest home win: Liberec 6–0 Karviná; 9 November 2025
- Biggest away win: Mladá Boleslav 0–5 Plzeň; 19 August 2025
- Highest scoring: Plzeň 3–5 Slavia; 9 November 2025

The 2025–26 Czech First League, known as the Chance Liga for sponsorship reasons, is the 33rd season of the Czech Republic's top-tier football for professional clubs since its establishment, in 1993. Slavia Prague are the reigning champions. The season is scheduled to start in July 2025. The first half of the season will have 19 rounds, finishing in December, and the other half will commence on 31 January 2026. The season is expected to end on 24 May 2026 with two extra play-out fixtures on 26–27 and 30–31 May 2026.

== Format ==
The general season format is unchanged from last season. The 16 clubs will play each other home and away, until the league is split up in championship, play-off and relegation groups. The lowest-ranked team will be relegated directly to the second league, and the two teams positioned 14th and 15th will play a play-out with two teams from the second league positioned 2nd and 3rd in a home and away format.

This will be the eighth season to use VAR, featuring it in all matches played. There are no changes in the rules. The schedule also has not changed compared to last season.

== Teams ==
Locations of the 2025–26 Czech First League teams

=== Promotion and relegation (pre-season) ===
A total of sixteen teams contest the league, including thirteen sides from the 2024–25 season, the winner of last season's second league, and two winners of the play-out, determined on 1 June 2025.

Team promoted to Czech First League

After being relegated in the 2023–24 season, FC Zlín returns to Czech First League as the champion of the 2024–25 Czech National Football League.

Teams relegated from Czech First League

The lowest positioned team from the last season, SK Dynamo České Budějovice, was relegated to the Czech National Football League.

=== Locations and stadiums ===
Team	Location	Stadium	Capacity	Ref.
Bohemians 1905	Prague (Vršovice)	Ďolíček	6,300	
FK Dukla Prague	Prague (Dejvice)	Stadion Juliska	8,150	
FC Hradec Králové	Hradec Králové	Malšovická aréna	9,300	
FK Jablonec	Jablonec nad Nisou	Stadion Střelnice	5,690	
MFK Karviná	Karviná	Městský stadion (Karviná)	4,833	
FC Slovan Liberec	Liberec	Stadion u Nisy	9,900	
FK Mladá Boleslav	Mladá Boleslav	Lokotrans Aréna	5,000	
SK Sigma Olomouc	Olomouc	Andrův stadion	12,474	
FC Baník Ostrava	Ostrava	Městský stadion (Ostrava)	15,081	
FK Pardubice	Pardubice	CFIG Arena	4,620	
FC Viktoria Plzeň	Plzeň	Doosan Arena	11,597	
SK Slavia Prague	Prague (Vršovice)	Fortuna Arena	19,370	
1. FC Slovácko	Uherské Hradiště	Městský fotbalový stadion Miroslava Valenty	8,000	
AC Sparta Prague	Prague (Letná)	epet ARENA	18,349	
FK Teplice	Teplice	Na Stínadlech	17,078	
FC Zlín	Zlín	Letná Stadion	5,898	

Rank	Region	Number of teams	Club(s)
1	Prague	4	Bohemians 1905, Dukla Prague, Sparta Prague, Slavia Prague
2	Liberec	2	Jablonec, Slovan Liberec
2	Moravian-Silesian	2	Baník Ostrava, Karviná
2	Zlín	2	Slovácko, Zlín
5	Central Bohemian	1	Mladá Boleslav
5	Hradec Králové	1	Hradec Králové
5	Olomouc	1	Sigma Olomouc
5	Pardubice	1	Pardubice
5	Plzeň	1	Viktoria Plzeň
5	Ústí nad Labem	1	Teplice

== Managerial changes ==
Pre-season:

Team	Outgoing manager	Manner of departure	Date of vacancy	Replaced by	Date of appointment	Contract valid until
Mladá Boleslav	(Football Association of the Czech Republic) Josef Jinoch	End of caretaker spell	25 May 2025	(Football Association of the Czech Republic) Aleš Majer	2 June 2024	Undisclosed
Slovácko	(Football Association of the Czech Republic) Tomáš Palinek	End of caretaker spell	25 May 2025	(Football Association of the Czech Republic) Jan Kameník	5 June 2025	Undisclosed
Sparta Prague	(Football Association of the Czech Republic) Luboš Loučka	End of caretaker spell	24 May 2025	(Danish Football Association) Brian Priske	8 June 2025	Undisclosed
Dukla Prague	(Football Association of the Czech Republic) Petr Rada	End of contract	2 June 2025	(Football Association of the Czech Republic) David Holoubek	16 June 2025	Undisclosed

During the season:

Team	Outgoing manager	Manner of departure	Date of vacancy	Match-week	Position in table	Replaced by	Date of appointment	Contract valid until
Viktoria Plzeň	(Football Association of the Czech Republic) Miroslav Koubek	Mutual consent	29 September 2025	10	5th	(Slovak Football Association) Marek Bakoš (caretaker)	29 September 2025	Undisclosed
Pardubice	(Football Association of the Czech Republic) David Střihavka	Sacked	29 September 2025	10	16th	(Football Association of the Czech Republic) Jiří Krejčí (caretaker)	29 September 2025	Undisclosed
Baník Ostrava	(Football Association of the Czech Republic) Pavel Hapal	Mutual consent	11 October 2025	12	11th	(Football Association of the Czech Republic) Tomáš Galásek	12 October 2025	Undisclosed
Pardubice	(Football Association of the Czech Republic) Jiří Krejčí	End of caretaker spell	14 October 2025	12	16th	(Football Association of the Czech Republic) Jan Trousil	14 October 2025	Undisclosed
Karviná	(Football Association of the Czech Republic) Martin Hyský	Signed by Viktoria Plzeň	15 October 2025	12	8th	(Football Association of the Czech Republic) Marek Jarolím	15 October 2025	Undisclosed
Viktoria Plzeň	(Slovak Football Association) Marek Bakoš	End of caretaker spell	15 October 2025	12	6th	(Football Association of the Czech Republic) Martin Hyský	15 October 2025	2028
Slovácko	(Football Association of the Czech Republic) Jan Kameník	Sacked	3 November 2025	14	16th	(Football Association of the Czech Republic) Roman Skuhravý	18 November 2025	Undisclosed
Dukla Prague	(Football Association of the Czech Republic) David Holoubek	Sacked	10 February 2026	21	16th	(Football Association of the Czech Republic) Pavel Šustr	12 February 2026	Undisclosed
Baník Ostrava	(Football Association of the Czech Republic) Tomáš Galásek	Sacked	16 February 2026	22	14th	(Football Association of the Czech Republic) Ondřej Smetana	16 February 2026	Undisclosed
Sigma Olomouc	(Football Association of the Czech Republic) Tomáš Janotka	Sacked	12 April 2026	29	7th	(Football Association of the Czech Republic) Pavel Hapal (caretaker)	12 April 2026	Undisclosed
Baník Ostrava	(Football Association of the Czech Republic) Ondřej Smetana	Sacked	26 April 2026	30	16th	(Football Association of the Czech Republic) Josef Dvorník	26 April 2026	Undisclosed

== Regular season ==
=== League table ===
Pos	Team	Pld	W	D	L	GF	GA	GD	Pts	Qualification or relegation
1	Slavia Prague	30	21	8	1	63	23	+40	71	Qualification for the championship group
2	Sparta Prague	30	19	6	5	60	33	+27	63	Qualification for the championship group
3	Viktoria Plzeň	30	15	8	7	50	34	+16	53	Qualification for the championship group
4	Jablonec	30	15	6	9	41	33	+8	51	Qualification for the championship group
5	Hradec Králové	30	14	7	9	43	34	+9	49	Qualification for the championship group
6	Slovan Liberec	30	12	10	8	43	30	+13	46	Qualification for the championship group
7	Sigma Olomouc	30	12	7	11	34	34	0	43	Qualification for the middle group
8	Pardubice	30	11	8	11	39	46	−7	41	Qualification for the middle group
9	Karviná (Note: Karviná originally qualified for the Europa League play-off round as winners of the 2025–26 Czech Cup, but after to the administrative relegation due to alleged match-fixing at the beginning of the 2026–27 season, the club waived its right to participate in the Europa League.)	30	12	3	15	43	51	−8	39	Qualification for the middle group
10	Bohemians 1905	30	10	6	14	26	35	−9	36	Qualification for the middle group
11	Mladá Boleslav	30	8	11	11	44	52	−8	35	Qualification for the relegation group
12	Zlín	30	9	7	14	37	48	−11	34	Qualification for the relegation group
13	Teplice	30	6	11	13	29	38	−9	29	Qualification for the relegation group
14	Dukla Prague	30	4	11	15	20	42	−22	23 (Note: Head-to-head points: Dukla Prague 6, Slovácko 0.)	Qualification for the relegation group
15	Slovácko	30	5	8	17	26	45	−19	23	Qualification for the relegation group
16	Baník Ostrava	30	5	7	18	25	45	−20	22	Qualification for the relegation group

Source: Chance Liga
Rules for classification: 1) Points; 2) Head-to-head points; 3) Head-to-head goal difference; 4) Head-to-head goals scored; 5) Goal difference; 6) Goals scored; 7) Fair-play ranking; 8) Draw.

=== Results ===
Home \ Away	BOH	DUK	HKR	JAB	KAR	LIB	MLA	OLO	OST	PCE	PLZ	SLA	SLO	SPA	TEP	ZLN
Bohemians 1905	—	1–0	1–2	0–1	0–3	0–0	1–1	2–2	1–0	1–2	0–1	0–2	1–0	2–0	0–1	2–1
Dukla Prague	0–2	—	1–1	2–0	1–2	1–1	0–1	2–2	1–1	0–2	2–0	0–2	1–0	0–3	1–3	0–0
Hradec Králové	2–0	3–0	—	2–0	1–2	2–3	1–1	1–0	1–0	1–1	0–3	2–1	4–0	2–1	0–0	0–0
Jablonec	1–0	0–0	2–0	—	1–0	1–2	2–0	1–2	4–1	3–2	3–3	1–1	0–0	1–1	1–0	1–3
Karviná	1–2	2–0	4–3	1–2	—	3–1	0–3	1–1	0–0	1–2	0–2	1–3	0–2	2–1	4–1	0–1
Slovan Liberec	0–0	2–0	0–1	0–2	6–0	—	0–0	1–0	1–0	2–1	1–1	1–1	2–1	0–2	1–1	2–0
Mladá Boleslav	2–2	1–1	3–2	3–0	2–4	3–3	—	1–4	1–1	2–0	0–5	1–3	0–0	1–2	0–0	3–1
Sigma Olomouc	1–0	0–0	1–0	2–0	2–2	2–1	2–4	—	1–0	2–0	1–2	0–0	2–1	0–1	0–0	1–0
Baník Ostrava	0–2	3–1	0–1	0–1	1–2	0–2	0–0	2–0	—	1–4	0–1	0–2	2–0	0–3	1–1	6–2
Pardubice	1–1	1–1	1–0	0–2	2–1	0–4	2–1	2–1	0–1	—	1–5	1–1	1–1	1–3	1–1	3–1
Viktoria Plzeň	2–0	2–0	3–3	1–1	2–1	3–1	2–1	1–0	2–0	0–1	—	3–5	1–1	0–0	2–2	0–1
Slavia Prague	3–1	2–0	2–2	4–3	3–1	1–0	4–0	2–1	2–0	3–1	0–0	—	3–0	3–1	3–0	0–0
Slovácko	1–2	1–2	1–3	0–2	1–2	0–3	2–2	0–1	2–2	2–0	3–0	0–1	—	0–0	2–1	2–0
Sparta Prague	2–1	3–2	2–0	3–1	2–0	2–2	3–2	1–0	5–2	2–4	2–1	1–1	5–2	—	2–2	3–1
Teplice	3–0	0–0	0–1	0–1	2–0	1–1	2–3	1–3	1–0	0–0	1–2	1–2	1–0	0–1	—	1–3
Zlín	0–1	1–1	1–2	0–3	1–3	1–0	3–2	5–0	1–1	2–2	3–0	1–3	1–1	0–3	3–2	—

Source: Chance Liga
Legend: Blue = home team win; Yellow = draw; Red = away team win.
For upcoming matches, an "a" indicates there is an article about the rivalry between the two participants.

== Championship group ==
Points and goals were carried over in full from the regular season.

Pos	Team	Pld	W	D	L	GF	GA	GD	Pts	Qualification or relegation	SLA	SPA	PLZ	HKR	JAB	LIB
1	Slavia Prague (C)	35	24	8	3	74	31	+43	80	Qualification for the Champions League league phase	—	0–3 (Note: Match was abandoned at 3–2 to Slavia Prague in stoppage time after Slavia fans stormed the pitch. On 12 May, the League Football Association awarded a 3–0 win to Sparta.)	3–0	—	5–1	—
2	Sparta Prague	35	23	7	5	69	34	+35	76	Qualification for the Champions League third qualifying round	—	—	0–0	2–1	2–0	—
3	Viktoria Plzeň	35	18	9	8	60	38	+22	63	Qualification for the Europa League play-off round	—	—	—	3–1	5–0	2–0
4	Hradec Králové	35	16	8	11	50	41	+9	56	Qualification for the Europa League second qualifying round	3–1	—	—	—	—	1–0
5	Jablonec	35	16	7	12	45	47	−2	55	Qualification for the Conference League second qualifying round	—	—	—	1–1	—	2–1
6	Slovan Liberec	35	12	10	13	45	39	+6	46		1–2	0–2	—	—	—	—

Source: Chance Liga
Legend: Blue = home team win; Yellow = draw; Red = away team win.
Rules for classification: 1) Total points; 2) Points earned in regular season; 3) Head-to-head points (regular season); 4) Head-to-head goal difference (regular season); 5) Head-to-head goals scored (regular season); 5) Goal difference (all matches); 6) Goals scored (all matches); 7) Fair-play ranking; 8) Draw.
(C) Champions

== Middle group ==
Teams will play a group for placement. The group winner will receive a financial bonus (3 mil. CZK) and will be rewarded with a favorable starting position in the 2026–27 Czech Cup.

First round
Bohemians 1905	1	2	3
Sigma Olomouc (a.e.t.)	3	1	4
Karviná (a.e.t.)	1	3	4
Pardubice	2	1	3

Second round
Karviná	1	0	1
Sigma Olomouc	3	4	7

== Relegation group ==
Points and goals were carried over in full from the regular season.

Pos	Team	Pld	W	D	L	GF	GA	GD	Pts	Qualification or relegation	TEP	ZLN	MLA	SLO	OST	DUK
11	Teplice	35	10	12	13	40	42	−2	42		—	—	—	1–1	2–1	2–0
12	Zlín	35	11	8	16	43	56	−13	41		2–4	—	—	1–0	—	2–1
13	Mladá Boleslav	35	9	13	13	49	57	−8	40		0–2	1–1	—	—	—	1–2
14	Slovácko (O)	35	7	9	19	30	51	−21	30	Qualification for the relegation play-offs	—	—	0–3	—	2–1	—
15	Baník Ostrava (O)	35	7	8	20	32	49	−17	29	Qualification for the relegation play-offs	—	2–0	0–0	—	—	—
16	Dukla Prague (R)	35	5	11	19	23	51	−28	26	Relegation to FNL	—	—	—	0–1	0–3	—

Source: Chance Liga
Legend: Blue = home team win; Yellow = draw; Red = away team win.
Rules for classification: 1) Total points; 2) Points earned in regular season; 3) Head-to-head points (regular season); 4) Head-to-head goal difference (regular season); 5) Head-to-head goals scored (regular season); 5) Goal difference (all matches); 6) Goals scored (all matches); 7) Fair-play ranking; 8) Draw.
(O) Play-off winners; (R) Relegated

== Relegation play-offs ==
Teams placed 14th and 15th in the relegation group faced the teams placed 2nd and 3rd in the Czech National Football League for two spots in the next season.

Team 1	Agg.	Team 2	1st leg	2nd leg
Artis Brno	1−7	Slovácko	1–4	0−3
Baník Ostrava	8–0	Táborsko	3–0	5–0

== Season statistics ==
=== Top scorers ===
Final standings

Rank	Player	Club	Goals
1	(Czech Republic) Tomáš Chorý	Slavia	17
2	(Czech Republic) Vojtěch Patrák	Pardubice	13
2	(Slovakia) Lukáš Haraslín	Sparta	13
2	(Czech Republic) Mojmír Chytil	Slavia	13
5	(Czech Republic) Jan Kuchta	Sparta	12
5	(Slovakia) Dávid Krčík	Karviná / Plzeň	12
7	(Czech Republic) Vladimír Darida	Hradec Králové	11
7	(Kosovo) Albion Rrahmani	Sparta	11
9	(Czech Republic) Jan Chramosta	Jablonec	10
9	(Czech Republic) Ondřej Mihálik	Hradec Králové	10

=== Hat-tricks ===
Matchweek	Date	Player	For	Against	Result
5	17 August 2025	(Nigeria Football Federation) Solomon John	Mladá Boleslav	Hradec Králové	3–2 (H)
3	19 August 2025	(Football Association of the Czech Republic) Denis Višinský	Plzeň	Mladá Boleslav	5–0 (A)
16	23 November 2025	(Nigeria Football Federation) Emmanuel Ayaosi	Karviná	Hradec Králové	4–3 (H)
19	14 December 2025	(Football Association of the Czech Republic) Stanislav Petruta	Zlín	Olomouc	5–0 (H)
25	8 March 2026	(Football Association of the Czech Republic) Václav Jurečka	Ostrava	Zlín	6–2 (H)

=== Clean sheets ===
Final standings

Rank	Player	Club	Clean sheets
1	(Football Association of the Czech Republic) Adam Zadražil	Hradec Králové	12
2	(Football Association of the Czech Republic) Tomáš Koubek	Liberec	11
2	(Football Association of the Czech Republic) Matouš Trmal	Teplice	11
4	(Football Association of the Czech Republic) Jan Hanuš	Jablonec	10
4	(Austrian Football Association) Florian Wiegele	Plzeň	10
6	(Football Association of the Czech Republic) Jan Koutný	Olomouc	9
6	(Football Association of the Czech Republic) Jiří Floder	Mladá Boleslav	9
6	(Football Association of the Czech Republic) Stanislav Dostál	Zlín	9
6	(Football Association of the Czech Republic) Michal Jedlička	Plzeň / Ostrava	9
10	(Danish Football Association) Peter Vindahl	Sparta	7
10	(Football Association of the Czech Republic) Jakub Markovič	Slavia	7

== Attendances ==
Czech First League clubs listed by average home league attendance:

Pos	Club	Average attendance
1	Sparta Praha	16,758
2	Slavia Praha	16,351
3	Viktoria Plzeň	9,119
4	Baník Ostrava	8,655
5	Hradec Králové	6,340
6	Bohemians	5,237
7	Sigma Olomouc	5,226
8	Slovan Liberec	4,224
9	FK Teplice	4,220
10	1. FC Slovácko	4,054
11	Dukla Praha	3,657
12	FC Zlín	3,365
13	FK Jablonec	2,976
14	FK Pardubice	2,631
15	MFK Karviná	2,426
16	Mladá Boleslav	2,041

== See also ==
- 2025–26 Czech National Football League
- 2025–26 Czech Cup
