= List of Czech football transfers winter 2024–25 =

This is a list of Czech football transfers for the 2024–25 winter transfer window. Only transfers featuring Czech First League are listed.

== Czech First League ==
Note: Flags indicate national team as has been defined under FIFA eligibility rules. Players may hold more than one non-FIFA nationality.

=== Sparta Prague ===
In:

No.	Pos.	Nation	Player
8	MF	DEN	Magnus Kofod Andersen (from (Italy) Venezia)
10	FW	CZE	Jan Kuchta (on loan from (Denmark) Midtjylland)
16	DF	NGA	Emmanuel Uchenna (from Baník Ostrava)

Out:

No.	Pos.	Nation	Player
4	MF	NOR	Markus Solbakken (on loan to (Italy) Pisa)
13	MF	CZE	Kryštof Daněk (on loan to (Austria) LASK)
21	MF	CZE	Jakub Pešek (to (Poland) Wieczysta Kraków)
24	GK	CZE	Vojtěch Vorel (on loan to Pardubice)
—	MF	CZE	Filip Souček (on loan to (Slovakia) Ružomberok, previously on loan at Slovácko)
—	MF	CZE	Michal Ševčík (on loan to Mladá Boleslav, previously on loan at (Germany) 1. FC Nürnberg)
—	FW	CZE	Václav Sejk (to (Portugal) Famalicão, previously on loan at (Poland) Zagłębie Lubin)

=== Slavia Prague ===
In:

No.	Pos.	Nation	Player
6	MF	KEN	Timothy Ouma (from (Sweden) Elfsborg)
9	FW	CZE	Vasil Kušej (from Mladá Boleslav)
16	MF	NGA	David Moses (from Karviná)
29	MF	LBR	Divine Teah (from (Sweden) Hammarby)
35	GK	CZE	Jakub Markovič (from Baník Ostrava)
—	DF	GUI	Sahmkou Camara (from (Switzerland) Stade Lausanne Ouchy)

Out:

No.	Pos.	Nation	Player
6	MF	NOR	Conrad Wallem (on loan to (United States) St. Louis City)
8	MF	CZE	Lukáš Masopust (on loan to Slovan Liberec)
11	FW	CZE	Daniel Fila (to (Italy) Venezia)
20	MF	CZE	Alexandr Bužek (on loan to Karviná)
23	MF	CZE	Petr Ševčík (on loan to Jablonec)
24	GK	CZE	Aleš Mandous (on loan to Mladá Boleslav)
28	MF	CZE	Filip Prebsl (on loan to (Poland) Górnik Zabrze)
31	GK	CZE	Antonín Kinský (to (England) Tottenham Hotspur)
32	MF	CZE	Ondřej Lingr (to (United States) Houston Dynamo)
35	MF	CZE	Matěj Jurásek (to (England) Norwich City)
—	DF	GUI	Sahmkou Camara (on loan to Karviná)
—	DF	CZE	Denis Halinský (on loan to Teplice, previously on loan at Slovan Liberec)
—	DF	SVK	Michal Tomič (on loan to Karviná, previously on loan at (Norway) Bodø/Glimt)
—	DF	SYR	Aiham Ousou (to (Belgium) Charleroi, previously on loan)

=== Viktoria Plzeň ===
In:

No.	Pos.	Nation	Player
14	DF	IRQ	Merchas Doski (from Slovácko)
99	MF	BIH	Amar Memić (from Karviná)
—	DF	CZE	Karel Spáčil (from Hradec Králové)

Out:

No.	Pos.	Nation	Player
1	GK	AUT	Florian Wiegele (on loan to (Austria) Grazer AK)
7	MF	CZE	Jan Sýkora (to Sigma Olomouc)
9	FW	BRA	Ricardinho (on loan to (Israel) Maccabi Haifa)
18	MF	COL	Jhon Mosquera (to Dukla Prague)
29	MF	CZE	Tom Slončík (on loan to Hradec Králové)
33	MF	SVK	Erik Jirka (to (Poland) Piast Gliwice)
—	DF	CZE	Karel Spáčil (on loan to Hradec Králové)

=== Baník Ostrava ===
In:

No.	Pos.	Nation	Player
11	FW	CZE	David Látal (from Chrudim)
21	MF	CZE	Michal Kohút (from Slovácko)
22	FW	CZE	Tomáš Zlatohlávek (from Pardubice)
25	MF	GER	Dennis Owusu (from (Germany) SGV Freiberg)
35	GK	CZE	Jakub Trefil (on loan from Sigma Olomouc)
99	DF	GRE	Georgios Kornezos (from (Greece) Lamia)

Out:

No.	Pos.	Nation	Player
2	DF	NGA	Emmanuel Uchenna (to Sparta Prague)
20	FW	NGA	Abdullahi Tanko (to Pardubice)
21	FW	CZE	Jiří Klíma (on loan to Slovácko)
23	MF	MLI	Issa Fomba (loan return to Vyškov)
35	GK	CZE	Jakub Markovič (to Slavia Prague)
—	FW	SVK	Ladislav Almási (on loan to (Hungary) Zalaegerszeg, previously on loan at (Slovakia) Dunajská Streda)
—	MF	CZE	Lukáš Cienciala (to Třinec, previously on loan)

=== Mladá Boleslav ===
In:

No.	Pos.	Nation	Player
6	MF	CZE	Vojtěch Hora (from České Budějovice)
7	MF	KOS	Ylldren Ibrahimaj (from (Norway) Lillestrøm)
16	DF	KOS	Jetmir Haliti (from (Poland) Jagiellonia Białystok)
22	MF	CZE	Michal Ševčík (on loan from Sparta Prague, previously on loan at (Germany) 1. FC Nürnberg)
24	DF	CZE	Dominik Mareš (from Pardubice)
26	DF	CZE	Matěj Zachoval (on loan from Slavia Prague B)
27	GK	CZE	Aleš Mandous (on loan from Slavia Prague)

Out:

No.	Pos.	Nation	Player
6	MF	CZE	Daniel Langhamer (on loan to Teplice)
7	MF	CZE	Patrik Žitný (to Zbrojovka Brno)
21	MF	CZE	Lukáš Fila (on loan to Pardubice)
23	FW	CZE	Vasil Kušej (to Slavia Prague)
26	DF	SVK	Andrej Kadlec (on loan to (Slovakia) Ružomberok)
29	GK	CZE	Matouš Trmal (on loan to Teplice)
32	FW	GAM	Lamin Jawo (on loan to Jablonec)
66	DF	CZE	Patrik Vydra (loan return to Sparta Prague)
99	GK	CZE	Petr Mikulec (to Prostějov)

=== Slovácko ===
In:

No.	Pos.	Nation	Player
4	DF	MKD	Andrej Stojchevski (on loan from (Slovakia) Žilina)
7	DF	SVK	Martin Koscelník (from (Netherlands) NAC Breda)
9	FW	CZE	Jiří Klíma (on loan from Baník Ostrava)
11	MF	CZE	Štěpán Beran (from Slavia Prague B)
22	MF	CRO	Robert Mišković (from (Romania) Politehnica Iași)
25	DF	CZE	Jiří Hamza (from Zbrojovka Brno)

Out:

No.	Pos.	Nation	Player
4	DF	CZE	Tomáš Břečka (to Zbrojovka Brno)
6	DF	CZE	Stanislav Hofmann (to Zbrojovka Brno)
11	MF	CZE	Milan Petržela (to Viktoria Žižkov)
13	MF	CZE	Michal Kohút (to Baník Ostrava)
14	DF	IRQ	Merchas Doski (to Viktoria Plzeň)
22	FW	CUW	Rigino Cicilia (free agent)
26	MF	CZE	Filip Souček (loan return to Sparta Prague)

=== Slovan Liberec ===
In:

No.	Pos.	Nation	Player
22	DF	CZE	Jan Knapík (from Teplice)
26	MF	CZE	Lukáš Masopust (on loan from Slavia Prague)
29	DF	CZE	Dominik Mašek (from České Budějovice B)
32	DF	CZE	Šimon Gabriel (from (Slovakia) Ružomberok)
40	GK	CZE	Tomáš Koubek (free agent)
99	FW	LVA	Raimonds Krollis (from (Italy) Spezia, previously on loan at (Italy) Triestina)

Out:

No.	Pos.	Nation	Player
10	FW	SVK	Ľubomír Tupta (on loan to (Poland) Widzew Łódź)
13	DF	CZE	Adam Ševínský (loan return to Sparta Prague)
16	FW	NED	Olaf Kok (on loan to Vyškov)
20	DF	CZE	Dominik Preisler (to (Poland) Ruch Chorzów)
30	DF	CZE	Denis Halinský (loan return to Slavia Prague)
31	GK	CZE	Hugo Jan Bačkovský (on loan to (Slovakia) Ružomberok)
37	DF	GRE	Marios Pourzitidis (on loan to Dukla Prague)
—	MF	CZE	Tomáš Polyák (on loan to Silon Táborsko, previously on loan at Pardubice)
—	DF	CZE	Ondřej Lehoczki (to Opava, previously on loan)

=== Sigma Olomouc ===
In:

No.	Pos.	Nation	Player
2	DF	GUI	Abdoulaye Sylla (on loan from Vyškov)
32	MF	EST	Vladislav Kreida (from (Estonia) Flora)
47	MF	LTU	Artūr Dolžnikov (from (Lithuania) Kauno Žalgiris)
49	MF	CZE	Jan Sýkora (from Viktoria Plzeň)

Out:

No.	Pos.	Nation	Player
—	GK	CZE	Jakub Trefil (on loan to Baník Ostrava, previously on loan at (Slovakia) Komárno)
—	FW	CZE	Pavel Zifčák (on loan to Vyškov, previously on loan at Pardubice)

=== Hradec Králové ===
In:

No.	Pos.	Nation	Player
13	DF	CZE	Karel Spáčil (on loan from Viktoria Plzeň)
19	MF	CZE	Tom Slončík (on loan from Viktoria Plzeň)

Out:

No.	Pos.	Nation	Player
7	MF	CZE	Ladislav Krejčí (to Teplice)
10	MF	CZE	Petr Pudhorocký (on loan to (Slovakia) Skalica)
13	DF	CZE	Karel Spáčil (to Viktoria Plzeň)
19	MF	CZE	Daniel Kaštánek (loan return to Sparta Prague)
23	FW	CZE	Matěj Náprstek (on loan to Chrudim)
29	FW	CZE	Matěj Koubek (to Zlín)

=== Teplice ===
In:

No.	Pos.	Nation	Player
11	MF	CZE	Daniel Langhamer (on loan from Mladá Boleslav)
14	MF	CZE	Ladislav Krejčí (from Hradec Králové)
16	DF	CZE	Dalibor Večerka (from Sparta Prague B)
17	DF	CZE	Denis Halinský (on loan from Slavia Prague, previously on loan at Slovan Liberec)
28	FW	CZE	Radek Šiler (on loan from Sparta Prague B)
29	GK	CZE	Matouš Trmal (on loan from Mladá Boleslav)

Out:

No.	Pos.	Nation	Player
4	DF	CZE	Jakub Hora (on loan to Varnsdorf)
11	MF	CZE	Filip Havelka (to České Budějovice)
14	FW	CZE	Tadeáš Vachoušek (on loan to Zbrojovka Brno)
16	DF	UKR	Yehor Tsykalo (on loan to (Poland) Ruch Chorzów)
17	FW	SVK	Roman Čerepkai (to (Slovakia) Košice)
28	DF	CZE	Jan Knapík (to Slovan Liberec)

=== Jablonec ===
In:

No.	Pos.	Nation	Player
23	MF	CZE	Petr Ševčík (on loan from Slavia Prague)
44	FW	GAM	Lamin Jawo (on loan from Mladá Boleslav)
57	DF	CZE	Filip Novák (free agent)

Out:

No.	Pos.	Nation	Player
2	DF	COL	Haiderson Hurtado (to (Azerbaijan) Turan Tovuz)
8	MF	BRA	Dudu Nardini (to (Romania) Politehnica Iași)
36	FW	CZE	Tomáš Schánělec (loan return to Sparta Prague B)

=== Pardubice ===
In:

No.	Pos.	Nation	Player
9	FW	ALB	Elmedin Rama (on loan from Slavia Prague B)
12	DF	CZE	Jan Trédl (from Slavia Prague B)
16	MF	CZE	Filip Šancl (on loan from Slavia Prague B)
25	DF	FIN	Ryan Mahuta (from (Finland) Haka)
28	FW	NGA	Abdullahi Tanko (from Baník Ostrava)
37	MF	CZE	Lukáš Fila (on loan from Mladá Boleslav)
39	FW	CZE	Denis Alijagić (on loan from (Slovakia) Žilina)
42	GK	CZE	Vojtěch Vorel (on loan from Sparta Prague)

Out:

No.	Pos.	Nation	Player
6	MF	CZE	Tomáš Polyák (loan return to Slovan Liberec)
15	MF	CZE	Denis Darmovzal (on loan to Chrudim)
16	DF	CZE	Dominik Mareš (to Mladá Boleslav)
33	FW	CZE	Tomáš Zlatohlávek (to Baník Ostrava)
35	FW	CZE	Pavel Zifčák (loan return to Sigma Olomouc)
93	GK	SVK	Viktor Budinský (on loan to (Slovakia) Zemplín Michalovce)
—	FW	NGA	James Bello (loan return to Viktoria Plzeň B)

=== Bohemians ===
In:

No.	Pos.	Nation	Player
25	DF	NGA	Peter Kareem (from Vlašim)
41	MF	NGA	Nelson Okeke (on loan from Sparta Prague B)

Out:

No.	Pos.	Nation	Player
7	DF	CZE	Matěj Hybš (career break)
8	MF	CZE	Adam Jánoš (free agent)
17	MF	CZE	Martin Hála (to Chomutov)

=== Karviná ===
In:

No.	Pos.	Nation	Player
17	MF	CZE	Samuel Šigut (from České Budějovice)
21	MF	CZE	Alexandr Bužek (on loan from Slavia Prague)
29	DF	SVK	Michal Tomič (on loan from Slavia Prague, previously on loan at (Norway) Bodø/Glimt)
49	DF	GUI	Sahmkou Camara (on loan from Slavia Prague)
77	FW	SVN	Rok Štorman (from (Slovenia) Radomlje)

Out:

No.	Pos.	Nation	Player
2	MF	NGA	David Moses (to Slavia Prague)
17	FW	SVK	Martin Regáli (on loan to (Slovakia) Tatran Prešov)
19	MF	GRE	Giannis Fivos Botos (loan return to Slavia Prague)
22	DF	CZE	Jaroslav Svozil (to Dukla Prague)
26	FW	NGA	Lucky Ezeh (on loan to Banská Bystrica)
29	MF	SVK	Rajmund Mikuš (on loan to Dukla Prague)
34	GK	CZE	Milan Knobloch (free agent)
99	MF	BIH	Amar Memić (to Viktoria Plzeň)

=== České Budějovice ===
In:

No.	Pos.	Nation	Player
3	DF	CZE	Petr Hodouš (from Sparta Prague B)
10	MF	CZE	Filip Havelka (from Teplice)
16	DF	ARG	Nicolás Gorosito (from (Slovakia) Košice)
19	MF	MKD	Rayan Berberi (free agent)
21	MF	CZE	Martin Douděra (from Dukla Prague)
22	DF	SVK	Peter Pekarík (from (Slovakia) Žilina)
23	FW	NGA	Elvis Isaac (from (Slovakia) Slovan Bratislava)
25	DF	MLI	Mamadou Koné (from Silon Táborsko)

Out:

No.	Pos.	Nation	Player
7	MF	CZE	Samuel Šigut (to Karviná)
11	MF	CZE	Vojtěch Hora (to Mladá Boleslav)
16	MF	CZE	Marcel Čermák (to Dukla Prague)
19	MF	CZE	Petr Zíka (to Sparta Prague B)
21	FW	GER	Jakob Tranziska (to (Germany) Schweinfurt 05)
23	FW	CZE	Jakub Matoušek (on loan to Prostějov)
24	DF	CZE	Ondřej Novák (on loan to Silon Táborsko)
25	MF	CZE	Matouš Nikl (to Silon Táborsko)
28	DF	SVK	Juraj Kotula (to Tatran Prešov)
—	MF	CZE	Tomáš Hák (to Silon Táborsko)
—	FW	CZE	Tomáš Zajíc (free agent, previously on loan at Vyškov)

=== Dukla Prague ===
In:

No.	Pos.	Nation	Player
3	DF	POR	Jorginho (from (Finland) Ilves)
8	MF	COL	Jhon Mosquera (from Viktoria Plzeň)
10	MF	SVK	Rajmund Mikuš (on loan from Karviná)
19	MF	CZE	Marcel Čermák (from České Budějovice)
22	FW	CMR	Kevin-Prince Milla (on loan from (Austria) Grazer AK, previously on loan at (Austria) Voitsberg)
25	DF	CZE	Jaroslav Svozil (from Karviná)
33	DF	GRE	Marios Pourzitidis (on loan from Slovan Liberec)

Out:

No.	Pos.	Nation	Player
8	MF	CZE	David Pech (loan return to Slavia Prague)
10	MF	CZE	Pavel Moulis (on loan to Ústí nad Labem)
11	MF	CZE	Martin Douděra (to České Budějovice)
16	DF	CZE	Filip Matoušek (on loan to Vlašim)
19	DF	CZE	Ondřej Ullman (on loan to (Latvia) Jelgava)
22	FW	CZE	Lukáš Matějka (on loan to (Slovakia) Skalica)

== See also ==
- 2024–25 Czech First League
