= 2024–25 SK Slavia Prague season =

SK Slavia Prague
2024–25 season
- Manager: Jindřich Trpišovský
- Stadium: Fortuna Arena
- Czech First League: Champions
- Czech Cup: Quarter-finals vs Sigma Olomouc
- Champions League: Play-off round vs Lille
- Europa League: League phase, 30th
- Top goalscorer: League: Tomáš Chorý (14); All: Tomáš Chorý (20)
- Highest home attendance: 19,322 (vs Baník Ostrava, 24 May 2025, Czech First League)
- Lowest home attendance: 16,109 (vs Mladá Boleslav, 2 February 2025, Czech First League)
- Average home league attendance: 18,306
| Home colours | Away colours | Third colours |

The 2024–25 season was the 132nd season in the history of SK Slavia Prague, and the club's 32nd consecutive season in Czech First League. In addition to the domestic league, the team participated in the Czech Cup, the UEFA Champions League and the UEFA Europa League.

== Season events ==
On 24 May, Slavia extended their contract with Igoh Ogbu until 31 December 2027.

== Squad ==
As of match played 24 May 2025

| No. | Name | Nationality | Position | Date of birth (age) | Signed from | Signed in | Contract ends | Apps. | Goals |
Goalkeepers
| 1 | Ondřej Kolář | (Czech Republic) | GK | 17 October 1994 (aged 30) | Slovan Liberec | 2018 | 2027 | 221 | 1 |
| 35 | Jakub Markovič | (Czech Republic) | GK | 13 July 2001 (aged 23) | Baník Ostrava | 2025 | 2029 | 5 | 0 |
| 36 | Jindřich Staněk | (Czech Republic) | GK | 27 April 1996 (aged 29) | Viktoria Plzeň | 2024 | 2027 | 27 | 0 |
| | Aleks Bozhev | (Bulgaria) | GK | 19 July 2005 (aged 19) | CSKA 1948 Sofia | 2025 | 2029 | 0 | 0 |
| | Martin Berkovec | (Czech Republic) | GK | 12 February 1989 (aged 36) | Unattached | 2024 | | 49 | 0 |
Defenders
| 2 | Štěpán Chaloupek | (Czech Republic) | DF | 8 March 2003 (aged 22) | Teplice | 2024 | 2028 | 22 | 0 |
| 3 | Tomáš Holeš | (Czech Republic) | DF | 31 March 1993 (aged 32) | Jablonec | 2019 | | 206 | 18 |
| 4 | David Zima | (Czech Republic) | DF | 8 November 2000 (aged 24) | Torino | 2024 | 2028 | 105 | 3 |
| 5 | Igoh Ogbu | (Nigeria) | DF | 8 February 2000 (aged 25) | Lillestrøm | 2023 | 2027 | 93 | 5 |
| 12 | El Hadji Malick Diouf | (Senegal) | DF | 28 December 2004 (aged 20) | Tromsø | 2024 | 2028 | 50 | 9 |
| 18 | Jan Bořil | (Czech Republic) | DF | 11 January 1991 (aged 34) | Mladá Boleslav | 2016 | 2025 | 263 | 14 |
| 27 | Tomáš Vlček | (Czech Republic) | DF | 28 February 2001 (aged 24) | Academy | 2019 | | 43 | 0 |
| 33 | Ondřej Zmrzlý | (Czech Republic) | DF | 22 April 1999 (aged 26) | Sigma Olomouc | 2024 | 2027 | 39 | 4 |
| 46 | Mikuláš Konečný | (Czech Republic) | DF | 2 June 2006 (aged 18) | Academy | 2024 | | 8 | 1 |
| | Sahmkou Camara | (Guinea) | DF | 10 June 2003 (aged 21) | Stade Lausanne Ouchy | 2025 | | 0 | 0 |
| | Adam Rajnoha | (Slovakia) | DF | 14 April 2008 (aged 17) | MŠK Žilina | 2025 | | 0 | 0 |
Midfielders
| 6 | Timothy Ouma | (Kenya) | MF | 10 June 2004 (aged 20) | IF Elfsborg | 2025 | 2029 | 1 | 0 |
| 10 | Christos Zafeiris | (Greece) | MF | 23 February 2003 (aged 22) | Haugesund | 2023 | 2027 | 100 | 11 |
| 14 | Simion Michez | (Cameroon) | MF | 9 February 2002 (aged 23) | Beerschot | 2024 | 2028 | 17 | 1 |
| 16 | David Moses | (Nigeria) | MF | 20 January 2004 (aged 21) | MFK Karviná | 2025 | 2029 | 17 | 1 |
| 17 | Lukáš Provod | (Czech Republic) | MF | 23 October 1996 (aged 28) | Viktoria Plzeň | 2020 | | 185 | 19 |
| 19 | Oscar Dorley | (Liberia) | MF | 19 July 1998 (aged 26) | Slovan Liberec | 2019 | 2027 | 210 | 10 |
| 20 | Giannis Fivos Botos | (Greece) | MF | 20 December 2000 (aged 24) | Helmond Sport | 2024 | 2028 | 15 | 1 |
| 21 | David Douděra | (Czech Republic) | MF | 31 May 1998 (aged 26) | Mladá Boleslav | 2022 | 2028 | 124 | 12 |
| 29 | Divine Teah | (Liberia) | MF | 19 April 2006 (aged 19) | Hammarby | 2025 | 2029 | 10 | 0 |
| 48 | Dominik Pech | (Czech Republic) | MF | 9 April 2006 (aged 19) | Academy | 2023 | | 21 | 1 |
Forwards
| 7 | Milan Škoda | (Czech Republic) | FW | 16 January 1986 (aged 39) | Mladá Boleslav | 2023 | 2025 | 254 | 89 |
| 9 | Vasil Kušej | (Czech Republic) | FW | 24 May 2000 (aged 25) | Mladá Boleslav | 2025 | 2028 | 15 | 10 |
| 13 | Mojmír Chytil | (Czech Republic) | FW | 29 April 1999 (aged 26) | Sigma Olomouc | 2023 | 2027 | 89 | 33 |
| 22 | Lukáš Vorlický | (Czech Republic) | FW | 18 January 2002 (aged 23) | Atalanta | 2024 | | 6 | 0 |
| 25 | Tomáš Chorý | (Czech Republic) | FW | 26 January 1995 (aged 30) | Viktoria Plzeň | 2024 | 2027 | 45 | 20 |
| 26 | Ivan Schranz | (Slovakia) | FW | 13 September 1993 (aged 31) | Jablonec | 2021 | 2026 | 137 | 32 |
| 30 | Daniel Toula | (Czech Republic) | FW | 19 February 2005 (aged 20) | Academy | 2024 | | 2 | 0 |
| 37 | Vladimir Perišić | (Montenegro) | FW | 26 August 2004 (aged 20) | Budućnost Podgorica | 2024 | 2028 | 0 | 0 |
| | Filip Šancl | (Czech Republic) | FW | 23 June 2005 (aged 19) | Vysočina Jihlava | 2025 | 2029 | 0 | 0 |
Away on loan
| 6 | Conrad Wallem | (Norway) | MF | 9 June 2000 (aged 24) | Odd | 2023 | 2027 | 47 | 9 |
| 8 | Lukáš Masopust | (Czech Republic) | MF | 12 February 1993 (aged 32) | Jablonec | 2019 | | 200 | 24 |
| 20 | Alexandr Bužek | (Czech Republic) | MF | 2 August 2004 (aged 20) | Zlín | 2024 | 2028 | 2 | 1 |
| 23 | Petr Ševčík | (Czech Republic) | MF | 2 May 1994 (aged 31) | Slovan Liberec | 2019 | | 157 | 11 |
| 24 | Aleš Mandous | (Czech Republic) | GK | 21 April 1992 (aged 33) | Sigma Olomouc | 2021 | 2026 | 79 | 0 |
| 28 | Filip Prebsl | (Czech Republic) | DF | 4 March 2003 (aged 20) | Academy | 2020 | | 19 | 1 |
| 29 | Michal Tomič | (Slovakia) | DF | 30 March 1999 (aged 26) | 1. Slovácko | 2023 | 2026 | 32 | 2 |
| | Muhamed Tijani | (Nigeria) | FW | 26 July 2000 (aged 24) | Baník Ostrava | 2023 | 2028 | 33 | 4 |
Players who left during the season
| 2 | Sheriff Sinyan | (The Gambia) | DF | 19 July 1996 (aged 28) | Molde | 2023 | 2024 | 5 | 0 |
| 11 | Daniel Fila | (Czech Republic) | FW | 21 August 2002 (aged 22) | Mladá Boleslav | 2022 | 2026 | 25 | 3 |
| 15 | Václav Jurečka | (Czech Republic) | FW | 26 June 1994 (aged 30) | Slovácko | 2022 | 2025 | 81 | 49 |
| 31 | Antonín Kinský | (Czech Republic) | GK | 13 March 2003 (aged 22) | Dukla Prague | 2021 | | 29 | 0 |
| 32 | Ondřej Lingr | (Czech Republic) | MF | 7 October 1998 (aged 26) | Karviná | 2024 | 2028 | 162 | 41 |
| 35 | Matěj Jurásek | (Czech Republic) | MF | 30 August 2003 (aged 21) | Academy | 2021 | 2026 | 87 | 15 |
| 54 | Jan Tredl | (Czech Republic) | DF | 6 July 2004 (aged 20) | Academy | 2024 | | 1 | 0 |

== Transfers ==
=== In ===
| Date | Position | Nationality | Name | From | Fee | Ref. |
|---|---|---|---|---|---|---|
| 15 June 2024 | FW | (Czech Republic) | Alexandr Bužek | Zlín | Undisclosed | |
| 3 July 2024 | MF | (Greece) | Giannis Fivos Botos | Helmond Sport | Undisclosed | |
| 3 July 2024 | FW | (Czech Republic) | Tomáš Chorý | Viktoria Plzeň | Undisclosed | |
| 3 September 2024 | MF | (Cameroon) | Simion Michez | Beerschot | Undisclosed | |
| 3 September 2024 | MF | (Czech Republic) | Ondřej Lingr | Feyenoord | €2,200,000 | |
| 3 September 2024 | FW | (Montenegro) | Vladimir Perišić | Budućnost Podgorica | Undisclosed | |
| 17 September 2024 | GK | (Czech Republic) | Martin Berkovec | Unattached | Free | |
| 30 October 2024 | MF | (Liberia) | Divine Teah | Hammarby | Undisclosed | |
| 1 January 2025 | MF | (Nigeria) | David Moses | MFK Karviná | Undisclosed | |
| 1 January 2025 | FW | (Czech Republic) | Filip Šancl | Vysočina Jihlava | Undisclosed | |
| 7 January 2025 | GK | (Czech Republic) | Jakub Markovič | Baník Ostrava | Undisclosed | |
| 7 January 2025 | FW | (Czech Republic) | Vasil Kušej | Mladá Boleslav | Undisclosed | |
| 25 January 2025 | DF | (Guinea) | Sahmkou Camara | Stade Lausanne Ouchy | Undisclosed | |
| 29 January 2025 | GK | (Bulgaria) | Aleks Bozhev | CSKA 1948 Sofia | Undisclosed | |
| 21 February 2025 | MF | (Slovakia) | Adam Rajnoha | MŠK Žilina | Undisclosed | |
| 2 February 2025 | MF | (Kenya) | Timothy Ouma | IF Elfsborg | Undisclosed | |

=== Loans in ===
| Date from | Position | Nationality | Name | From | Date to | Ref. |
|---|---|---|---|---|---|---|
| 25 July 2024 | MF | (Czech Republic) | Pavel Kačor | MFK Karviná | 30 June 2025 | |
| 1 February 2025 | DF | (Liberia) | Emmanuel Fully | Watanga | 31 December 2025 | |

=== Out ===
| Date | Position | Nationality | Name | To | Fee | Ref. |
|---|---|---|---|---|---|---|
| 11 June 2024 | MF | (Czech Republic) | Marek Icha | Slovan Liberec | Undisclosed | |
| 15 June 2024 | MF | (Czech Republic) | Kryštof Čížek | 1899 Hoffenheim | Undisclosed | |
| 17 June 2024 | MF | (Slovakia) | Jakub Hromada | Rapid București | Undisclosed | |
| 18 June 2024 | GK | (Czech Republic) | Matyáš Vágner | Hradec Králové | Undisclosed | |
| 28 June 2024 | MF | (Brazil) | Ewerton | Baník Ostrava | Undisclosed | |
| 15 July 2024 | FW | (Netherlands) | Mick van Buren | KS Cracovia | Undisclosed | |
| 19 July 2024 | MF | (Czech Republic) | David Planka | MFK Karviná | Undisclosed | |
| 19 July 2024 | FW | (The Gambia) | Ebrima Singhateh | MFK Karviná | Undisclosed | |
| 2 January 2025 | DF | (Syria) | Aiham Ousou | Sporting Charleroi | Undisclosed | |
| 5 January 2025 | GK | (Czech Republic) | Antonín Kinský | Tottenham Hotspur | Undisclosed | |
| 16 January 2025 | MF | (Czech Republic) | Matěj Jurásek | Norwich City | Undisclosed | |
| 3 February 2025 | FW | (Czech Republic) | Daniel Fila | Venezia | Undisclosed | |
| 28 March 2025 | MF | (Czech Republic) | Ondřej Lingr | Houston Dynamo | Undisclosed | |

=== Loans out ===
| Date from | Position | Nationality | Name | To | Date to | Ref. |
|---|---|---|---|---|---|---|
| 2 July 2024 | FW | (Nigeria) | Muhamed Tijani | Plymouth Argyle | 30 June 2025 | |
| 19 July 2024 | MF | (Greece) | Giannis Fivos Botos | MFK Karviná | 31 December 2024 | |
| 31 July 2024 | DF | (Syria) | Aiham Ousou | Sporting Charleroi | 2 January 2025 | |
| 2 August 2024 | MF | (Czech Republic) | David Pech | Dukla Prague | 30 June 2025 | |
| 16 August 2024 | GK | (Czech Republic) | Adam Dvořák | TJ Sokol Živanice | 30 June 2025 | |
| 16 August 2024 | DF | (Czech Republic) | Jan Lacko | TJ Sokol Živanice | 31 December 2024 | |
| 16 August 2024 | MF | (Czech Republic) | Jakub Palán | TJ Sokol Živanice | 30 June 2025 | |
| 16 August 2024 | MF | (Czech Republic) | Matyáš Mervard | TJ Sokol Živanice | 30 June 2025 | |
| 18 August 2024 | DF | (Slovakia) | Michal Tomič | Bodø/Glimt | 31 December 2024 | |
| 9 September 2024 | DF | (Romania) | Andres Dumitrescu | Sepsi OSK | 30 June 2025 | |
| 13 January 2025 | MF | (Czech Republic) | Lukáš Masopust | Slovan Liberec | 30 June 2025 | |
| 25 January 2025 | DF | (Guinea) | Sahmkou Camara | MFK Karviná | 30 June 2025 | |
| 8 February 2025 | MF | (Czech Republic) | Filip Prebsl | Górnik Zabrze | 30 June 2025 | |
| 1 March 2025 | DF | (Czech Republic) | Denis Hanzelka | TJ Sokol Živanice | 30 June 2025 | |
| 1 March 2025 | MF | (Czech Republic) | David Hájek | TJ Sokol Živanice | 30 June 2025 | |
| 1 March 2025 | MF | (Ivory Coast) | Boris Koffi | TJ Sokol Živanice | 30 June 2025 | |
| 1 March 2025 | MF | (Ivory Coast) | Pregnon Bahi | TJ Sokol Živanice | 30 June 2025 | |
| 1 March 2025 | FW | (Nigeria) | Victor Uduebo | TJ Sokol Živanice | 30 June 2025 | |

=== Released ===
| Date | Position | Nationality | Name | Joined | Date | Ref |
|---|---|---|---|---|---|---|
| 30 June 2024 | DF | (The Gambia) | Sheriff Sinyan | Odd | 2 August 2024 | |

== Friendlies ==
=== Pre-season ===
| 29 June 2024 Friendly | Slavia Prague (Czech Republic) | 1–1 | (Czech Republic) Pardubice | Roudnice nad Labem |
| 14:00 | Jurečka 90+3' | | Míšek 57' | Stadium: Stadion Pod Lípou |

| 3 July 2024 Friendly | Śląsk Wrocław (Poland) | 0–2 | (Czech Republic) Slavia Prague | Aigen-Schlägl, Austria |
| 15:00 UTC+2 | | | Diouf 24'; Botos 68' | Stadium: Pöschl Park UFC Aigen-Schlägl |

| 6 July 2024 Friendly | Rapid Wien (Austria) | 0–3 | (Czech Republic) Slavia Prague | Bad Leonfelden, Austria |
| 17:00 UTC+2 | | | Fila 18'; Vorlický 55'; Diouf (yellow card) 41' (yellow-red card) 62'; Chaloupek 86' | Stadium: Sportplatz Bad Leonfelden |

| 9 July 2024 Friendly | Slavia Prague (Czech Republic) | 4–2 | (Slovakia) Železiarne Podbrezová | Rohrbach an der Lafnitz, Austria |
| 17:00 UTC+2 | Wallem 7'; Van Buren 52'; Pech 64'; Botos 88' | | Chaloupek 42' (o.g.); Juritka 45' | Stadium: Stadion Rohrbach |

| 13 July 2024 Friendly | MŠK Žilina (Slovakia) | 1–5 | (Czech Republic) Slavia Prague | Ulrichsberg, Austria |
| 16:00 UTC+2 | Kaprálik 90+2' | | Zima 50'; Fila 66'; Jurásek 71', 81', 82' | Stadium: Sportplatz Union Ulrichsberg |

=== Mid-season ===
| 15 January 2025 Friendly | Raków Częstochowa (Poland) | 2–2 | (Czech Republic) Slavia Prague |
| 16:00 |

| 19 January 2025 Friendly | Philadelphia Union (United States) | 0–1 | (Czech Republic) Slavia Prague |

== Competitions ==
=== Overall record ===
| Competition | First match | Last match | Starting round | Final position | Record | | | | | | | |
| Competition | First match | Last match | Starting round | Final position | Pld | W | D | L | GF | GA | GD | Win % |
|---|---|---|---|---|---|---|---|---|---|---|---|---|
| Czech First League | 21 July 2024 | 24 May 2025 | Matchday 1 | Winners | 35 | 29 | 3 | 3 | 77 | 18 | +59 | 82.86 |
| Czech Cup | 31 October 2024 | 2 April 2025 | Third round | Quarter-final | 3 | 2 | 0 | 1 | 5 | 2 | +3 | 66.67 |
| UEFA Champions League | 7 August 2024 | 28 August 2024 | Third qualifying round | Play-off round | 4 | 3 | 0 | 1 | 6 | 4 | +2 | 75.00 |
| UEFA Europa League | 25 September 2024 | 30 January 2025 | League phase | League phase | 8 | 1 | 2 | 5 | 7 | 11 | −4 | 12.50 |
| Total | | | | | 50 | 35 | 5 | 10 | 95 | 35 | +60 | 70.00 |

Last updated: 24 May 2025
Source: Soccerway

=== Czech First League ===
==== Regular season ====
===== League table =====
| Pos | Team | Pld | W | D | L | GF | GA | GD | Pts | Qualification or relegation |
|---|---|---|---|---|---|---|---|---|---|---|
| 1 | Slavia Prague | 30 | 25 | 3 | 2 | 61 | 11 | +50 | 78 | Qualification for the championship group |
| 2 | Viktoria Plzeň | 30 | 20 | 5 | 5 | 59 | 28 | +31 | 65 | Qualification for the championship group |
| 3 | Baník Ostrava | 30 | 20 | 4 | 6 | 52 | 26 | +26 | 64 | Qualification for the championship group |
| 4 | Sparta Prague | 30 | 19 | 5 | 6 | 56 | 33 | +23 | 62 | Qualification for the championship group |
| 5 | Jablonec | 30 | 15 | 6 | 9 | 47 | 25 | +22 | 51 | Qualification for the championship group |

Source: Chance Liga
Rules for classification: 1) Points; 2) Head-to-head points; 3) Head-to-head goal difference; 4) Head-to-head goals scored; 5) Goal difference; 6) Goals scored; 7) Fair-play ranking; 8) Draw.

===== Results summary =====
| Overall | | | | | | | | Home | | | | | | Away | | | | | |
| Pld | W | D | L | GF | GA | GD | Pts | W | D | L | GF | GA | GD | W | D | L | GF | GA | GD |
|---|---|---|---|---|---|---|---|---|---|---|---|---|---|---|---|---|---|---|---|
| 30 | 25 | 3 | 2 | 61 | 11 | +50 | 78 | 15 | 0 | 0 | 35 | 4 | +31 | 10 | 3 | 2 | 26 | 7 | +19 |

Last updated: 19 April 2025.
Source: Chance Liga

===== Results by round =====
| Round | 1 | 2 | 3 | 4 | 5 | 7 | 6 | 9 | 10 | 11 | 12 | 13 | 14 | 15 | 16 | 17 | 8 | 18 | 19 | 20 | 21 | 22 | 23 | 24 | 25 | 26 | 27 | 28 | 29 | 30 |
|---|---|---|---|---|---|---|---|---|---|---|---|---|---|---|---|---|---|---|---|---|---|---|---|---|---|---|---|---|---|---|
| Ground | A | H | A | H | H | A | H | A | H | A | H | A | H | A | H | A | H | A | A | H | A | H | A | H | A | H | A | H | A | H |
| Result | D | W | W | W | W | W | W | W | W | W | W | W | D | W | W | W | W | W | L | W | W | W | W | W | L | W | D | W | W | W |
| Position | 8 | 3 | 2 | 3 | 3 | 2 | 1 | 2 | 1 | 1 | 1 | 1 | 1 | 1 | 1 | 1 | 1 | 1 | 1 | 1 | 1 | 1 | 1 | 1 | 1 | 1 | 1 | 1 | 1 | 1 |

Updated to match(es) played on 19 April 2025. Source: Chance Liga
A = Away; H = Home; W = Win; D = Draw; L = Loss

===== Results =====
The match schedule was released on 20 June 2024.

| 21 July 2024 1 | 1. FC Slovácko | 0–0 | Slavia Prague | Uherské Hradiště |
| 17:00 CEST (UTC+2) | Kohút (yellow card) 26'; Doski (yellow card) 39'; Blahút (yellow card) 76' | Report | Dorley (yellow card) 32'; Bořil (yellow card) 51' | Stadium: Městský fotbalový stadion Miroslava Valenty; Attendance: 7,353; Referee: Karel Rouček |

| 27 July 2024 2 | Slavia Prague | 4–0 | České Budějovice | Prague |
| 20:00 CEST (UTC+2) | Douděra 2'; Fila 9'; Prebsl (yellow card) 37' (goal) 66'; Wallem 83'; Dorley (yellow card) 90+2' | Report | Tranziska (yellow card) 52'; Martin (yellow card) 63'; Zíka (yellow card) 89' | Stadium: Fortuna Arena; Attendance: 17,839; Referee: Jan Všetečka |

| 2 August 2024 3 | Slovan Liberec | 0–1 | Slavia Prague | Liberec |
| 17:30 CEST (UTC+2) | Frýdek (yellow card) 82' | Report | Diouf 40'; Schranz (yellow card) 84' | Stadium: Stadion u Nisy; Attendance: 9,011; Referee: Jan Machálek |

| 10 August 2024 4 | Slavia Prague | 2–0 | Sigma Olomouc | Prague |
| 20:00 CEST (UTC+2) | Jurečka 7' (pen.); Diouf 88' | Report | Leibl (yellow card) 26'; Kliment (yellow card) 48'; Navrátil (yellow card) 49' | Stadium: Fortuna Arena; Attendance: 17,724; Referee: Jan Petřík |

| 17 August 2024 5 | Slavia Prague | 2–1 | Teplice | Prague |
| 17:00 CEST (UTC+2) | Diouf (yellow card) 74'; Dorley 81'; Douděra (yellow card) 83'; Zafeiris 86' | Report | Cykalo (yellow card) 16'; Gning (yellow card) 43' (goal) 57'; Jukl (yellow card) 45+2'; Zsigmond (yellow card) 83'; Emmer (yellow card) 90+3'; Svatek (yellow card) 90+5' | Stadium: Fortuna Arena; Attendance: 18,021; Referee: Ondřej Pechanec |

| 1 September 2024 7 | Slavia Prague | 2–0 | Pardubice | Prague |
| 17:00 CEST (UTC+2) | Diouf 45+5'; Chorý 49'; Filip Prebsl (red card) 65'; Bořil (yellow card) 84'; Zafeiris (yellow card) 86'; Douděra (yellow card) 90+6' | Report | Šehić (yellow card) 45+2'; Ladislav Krobot (yellow card) 72'; Lurvink (yellow card) 77'; Surzyn (yellow card) 79' | Stadium: Fortuna Arena; Attendance: 17,983; Referee: Pavel Orel |

| 17 September 2024 6 | Mladá Boleslav | 0–2 | Slavia Prague | Mladá Boleslav |
| 19:30 CEST (UTC+2) | Vydra (yellow card) 30'; Suchý (yellow card) 54' | Report | Chytil 23'; Diouf 42'; Holeš (yellow card) 53'; Lingr (yellow card) 73' | Stadium: Lokotrans Aréna; Attendance: 4,823; Referee: Karel Rouček |

| 21 September 2024 9 | Slavia Prague | 3–0 | Viktoria Plzeň | Prague |
| 19:00 CEST (UTC+2) | Bořil 10'; Ogbu (yellow card) 19'; Douděra (yellow card) 45'; Chorý 45+1' (pen.); Provod 45+5' | Report | Marković (yellow card) 8'; Cadu (yellow card) 81'; Jemelka (yellow card) 87' | Stadium: Fortuna Arena; Attendance: 18,783; Referee: Dalibor Černý |

| 29 September 2024 10 | Bohemians 1905 | 0–4 | Slavia Prague | Prague |
| 18:30 CEST (UTC+2) | Vondra (yellow card) 60'; Hybš (yellow card) 75' | Report | Diouf 14'; Chorý 16'; Petrák 34' (o.g.); Zafeiris 50' | Stadium: Ďolíček; Attendance: 5,531; Referee: Jan Všetečka |

| 6 October 2024 11 | Slavia Prague | 2–1 | Sparta Prague | Prague |
| 18:30 CEST (UTC+2) | Chytil 2'; Zafeiris 22'; Douděra (yellow card) 52'; Chorý (yellow card) 60'; Diouf (yellow card) 72'; Wallem (yellow card) 86'; Provod (yellow card) 89'; Zmrzlý (yellow card) 90+1'; Bořil (yellow card) 90+4'; Dorley (red card) 90+8' | Report | Ryneš (yellow card) 19'; Vitík (yellow card) 60' (yellow-red card) 90+3'; Rrahmani 65' (yellow card) 90+8'; Kairinen (yellow card) 71'; Preciado (yellow card) 87'; Solbakken (yellow card) 89'; Vindahl (yellow card) 90+4' | Stadium: Fortuna Arena; Attendance: 19,308; Referee: Ladislav Szikszay |

| 20 October 2024 12 | Jablonec | 1–2 | Slavia Prague | Jablonec nad Nisou |
| 18:30 CEST (UTC+2) | Chanturishvili 66' | Report | Michez 18'; Lingr 61' | Stadium: Stadion Střelnice; Attendance: 5,237; Referee: Karel Rouček |

| 27 October 2024 13 | Slavia Prague | 3–0 | Dukla Prague | Prague |
| 15:30 CEST (UTC+2) | Chorý 33' (pen.) 89'; Lingr (yellow card) 43'; Jurásek 57' | Report | | Stadium: Fortuna Arena; Attendance: 18,402; Referee: Dominik Starý |

| 3 November 2024 14 | Hradec Králové | 1–1 | Slavia Prague | Hradec Králové |
| 18:30 CET (UTC+1) | Kodeš (yellow card) 52'; Vlkanova (yellow card) 78'; Petrášek 79'; Mihálik (yellow card) 90' | Report | Dorley (yellow card) 18'; Provod 74'; Bořil (yellow card) 78' | Stadium: Malšovická aréna Attendance: 9,300; Referee: Jan Beneš |

| 10 November 2024 15 | Slavia Prague | 5–1 | MFK Karviná | Prague |
| 18:30 CET (UTC+1) | Dorley 20', 78'; Chytil 69', 76', 84'; Chorý (yellow card) 74' | Report | Vecheta 62'; Boháč (yellow card) 73' | Stadium: Fortuna Arena; Attendance: 19,299; Referee: Vit Zaoral |

| 24 November 2024 16 | České Budějovice | 0–4 | Slavia Prague | České Budějovice |
| 15:30 CET (UTC+1) | Čermák (yellow card) 1'; Hák (yellow card) 63'; Adediran (yellow card) 84' | Report | Chorý 15' (pen.); Zafeiris 38'; Chytil 55' (pen.); Pech 88' | Stadium: Stadion Střelecký ostrov Attendance: 6,681; Referee: Daniel Vokoun |

| 1 December 2024 17 | Slavia Prague | 1–0 | Slovan Liberec | Prague |
| 13:00 CET (UTC+1) | Douděra (yellow card) 36'; Chytil 40'; Ogbu (yellow card) 49'; Chorý (yellow card) 90+2' | Report | Plechatý (yellow card) 39'; Santiago Eneme (yellow card) 90+2' | Stadium: Fortuna Arena; Attendance: 17,969; Referee: Jan Všetečka |

| 5 December 2024 8 | Baník Ostrava | 0–1 | Slavia Prague | Ostrava |
| 17:30 CET (UTC+1) | | Report | Diouf 29'; Zafeiris (yellow card) 87'; Kinský (yellow card) 90+9' | Stadium: Městský stadion Attendance: 14,659; Referee: Karel Rouček |
Note: Match originally scheduled for 17 September 2024

| 8 December 2024 18 | Sigma Olomouc | 1–2 | Slavia Prague | Olomouc |
| 15:30 CET (UTC+1) | Elbel 32'; Zorvan (yellow card) 83' | Report | Ogbu (yellow card) 47'; Chorý 79'; Provod 81' (yellow card) 90+5' | Stadium: Andrův stadion Attendance: 11,364; Referee: Lukáš Nehasil |

| 15 December 2024 19 | Teplice | 1–0 | Slavia Prague | Teplice |
| 15:30 CET (UTC+1) | Trubač 46' (yellow card) 90+7'; Takács (yellow card) 90+2' | Report | Prebsl (yellow card) 34' | Stadium: Na Stínadlech; Attendance: 9,124; Referee: Petr Hocek |

| 2 February 2025 20 | Slavia Prague | 1–0 | Mladá Boleslav | Prague |
| 18:30 CET (UTC+1) | Chorý 63' | Report | John (yellow card) 78'; Suchý (yellow card) 88' | Stadium: Fortuna Arena; Attendance: 16,109; Referee: Jan Beneš |

| 8 February 2025 21 | Pardubice | 0–2 | Slavia Prague | Pardubice |
| 16:00 CET (UTC+1) | Vacek (yellow card) 58'; Vorel (yellow card) 90+1' | Report | Zafeiris (yellow card) 33'; Schranz 51' (pen.); Chytil 60' | Stadium: CFIG Arena; Attendance: 4,620; Referee: Dalibor Černý |

| 16 February 2025 22 | Slavia Prague | 1–0 | Baník Ostrava | Prague |
| 18:30 CET (UTC+1) | Zima 8'; Douděra (yellow card) 72' | Report | Pojezný (yellow card) 13'; Chaluš (yellow card) 72' | Stadium: Fortuna Arena; Attendance: 18,105; Referee: Lukáš Nehasil |

| 23 February 2025 23 | Viktoria Plzeň | 1–3 | Slavia Prague | Plzeň |
| 18:30 CET (UTC+1) | Šulc 19' (pen.) | Report | Chorý 2', 42' (pen.); Ogbu 47' (yellow card) 84' | Stadium: Doosan Arena; Attendance: 11,113; Referee: Karel Rouček |

| 2 March 2025 24 | Slavia Prague | 2–0 | Bohemians 1905 | Prague |
| 18:30 CET (UTC+1) | Diouf 49' (yellow card) 85'; Chaloupek (yellow card) 78'; Botos 90+9' | Report | Čermák (red card) 29'; Vondra (yellow card) 64' | Stadium: Fortuna Arena; Attendance: 18,798; Referee: Ladislav Szikszay |

| 8 March 2025 25 | Sparta Prague | 2–0 | Slavia Prague | Prague |
| 19:00 CET (UTC+1) | Zelený 51'; Haraslín 57' | Report | Chytil (red card) 27'; Dorley (yellow card) 87'; Ogbu (yellow card) 90+3' | Stadium: Stadion Letná; Attendance: 18,207; Referee: Karel Rouček |

| 16 March 2025 26 | Slavia Prague | 3–0 | Jablonec | Prague |
| 18:30 CET (UTC+1) | Ogbu 9'; Chorý 18' (pen.); Hanuš 34' (o.g.) | Report | Souček (yellow card) 65' | Stadium: Fortuna Arena; Attendance: 17,884; Referee: Dalibor Černý |

| 29 March 2025 27 | Dukla Prague | 0–0 | Slavia Prague | Prague |
| 19:00 CET (UTC+1) | Hašek (yellow card) 38'; Milla (yellow card) 76'; Ludvíček (yellow card) 77' | Report | Douděra (yellow card) 36'; Chorý (yellow card) 45+3' | Stadium: Stadion Juliska; Attendance: 7,788; Referee: Vit Zaoral |

| 5 April 2025 28 | Slavia Prague | 2–1 | Hradec Králové | Prague |
| 19:00 CEST (UTC+2) | Kušej 24', 58'; Bořil (yellow card) 90' | Report | Griger 1'; Klíma (yellow card) 45' | Stadium: Fortuna Arena; Attendance: 18,292; Referee: Jan Všetečka |

| 11 April 2025 29 | MFK Karviná | 0–4 | Slavia Prague | Karviná |
| 16:00 CET (UTC+1) | | Report | Kušej 5', 32'; Provod 75'; Moses 88' | Stadium: Městský stadion Attendance: 4,526; Referee: Ondřej Berka |

| 19 April 2025 30 | Slavia Prague | 2–0 | 1. FC Slovácko | Prague |
| 16:00 CEST (UTC+2) | Zmrzlý 41'; Chytil 85' | Report | | Stadium: Fortuna Arena; Attendance: 18,205; Referee: Karel Rouček |

==== Championship group ====
===== League table =====
| Pos | Team | Pld | W | D | L | GF | GA | GD | Pts | Qualification or relegation |
|---|---|---|---|---|---|---|---|---|---|---|
| 1 | Slavia Prague (C) | 35 | 29 | 3 | 3 | 77 | 18 | +59 | 90 | Qualification for the Champions League league phase |
| 2 | Viktoria Plzeň | 35 | 23 | 5 | 7 | 71 | 36 | +35 | 74 | Qualification for the Champions League second qualifying round |
| 3 | Baník Ostrava | 35 | 22 | 5 | 8 | 58 | 34 | +24 | 71 | Qualification for the Europa League second qualifying round |
| 4 | Sparta Prague | 35 | 19 | 6 | 10 | 61 | 44 | +17 | 63 | Qualification for the Conference League second qualifying round |
| 5 | Jablonec | 35 | 19 | 6 | 10 | 60 | 33 | +27 | 63 | |
| 6 | Sigma Olomouc | 35 | 12 | 9 | 14 | 48 | 53 | −5 | 45 | Qualification for the Europa League play-off round (Note: The winner of the 2024–25 Czech Cup (Sigma Olomouc) qualifies for the Europa League play-off round.) |

Source: Chance Liga
Rules for classification: 1) Total points; 2) Points earned in regular season; 3) Head-to-head points (regular season); 4) Head-to-head goal difference (regular season); 5) Head-to-head goals scored (regular season); 5) Goal difference (all matches); 6) Goals scored (all matches); 7) Fair-play ranking; 8) Draw.
(C) Champions

===== Results summary =====
| Overall | | | | | | | | Home | | | | | | Away | | | | | |
| Pld | W | D | L | GF | GA | GD | Pts | W | D | L | GF | GA | GD | W | D | L | GF | GA | GD |
|---|---|---|---|---|---|---|---|---|---|---|---|---|---|---|---|---|---|---|---|
| 5 | 4 | 0 | 1 | 16 | 7 | +9 | 12 | 3 | 0 | 0 | 9 | 4 | +5 | 1 | 0 | 1 | 7 | 3 | +4 |

Last updated: 24 May 2025.
Source: See results

===== Results by round =====
| Round | 31 | 32 | 33 | 34 | 35 |
|---|---|---|---|---|---|
| Ground | A | H | H | A | H |
| Result | W | W | W | L | W |
| Position | 1 | 1 | 1 | 1 | 1 |

Updated to match(es) played on 24 May 2025. Source: See results
A = Away; H = Home; W = Win; D = Draw; L = Loss

===== Results =====
| 26 April 2025 31 | Sigma Olomouc | 0–5 | Slavia Prague | Olomouc |
| 19:00 CEST (UTC+2) | Dolžnikov (yellow card) 8'; Král (yellow card) 44' | Report | Kušej 22', 60', 66'; Chorý (yellow card) 42' (goal) 46', 52' (pen.) | Stadium: Andrův stadion Attendance: 12,237; Referee: Dominik Starý |

| 3 May 2025 32 | Slavia Prague | 4–3 | Viktoria Plzeň | Prague |
| 16:00 CEST (UTC+2) | Schranz 9'; Zafeiris (yellow card) 21' (goal) 57'; Zima 69'; Holeš 73'; Chorý (yellow card) 77' | Report | Šulc 15' (pen.); Vydra 22'; Memić 55'; Dweh (yellow card) 66' | Stadium: Fortuna Arena; Attendance: 18,413; Referee: Jan Všetečka |

| 10 May 2025 33 | Slavia Prague | 2–1 | Sparta Prague | Prague |
| 19:00 CEST (UTC+2) | Chorý 9'; Bořil (yellow card) 18'; Schranz (yellow card) 82'; Dorley 87' (yellow card) 90+5'; Douděra (yellow card) 90+3' | Report | Olatunji (yellow card) 4'; Vydra (yellow card) 45+1'; Rrahmani 56'; Sadílek (yellow card) 59'; Vindahl (yellow card) 85'; Tuci (yellow card) 90+5'; Vitík (yellow card) 90+5' | Stadium: Fortuna Arena; Attendance: 19,048; Referee: Jan Beneš |

| 18 May 2025 34 | Jablonec | 3–2 | Slavia Prague | Jablonec nad Nisou |
| 17:00 CEST (UTC+2) | Chramosta 81'; Puškáč 83', 88' | Report | Kušej 13', 47'; Chaloupek (yellow card) 24'; Michez (yellow card) 34'; Diouf (yellow card) 84'; Vlček (yellow card) 90+1' | Stadium: Stadion Střelnice; Attendance: 4,504; Referee: Dominik Starý |

| 24 May 2025 35 | Slavia Prague | 3–0 | Baník Ostrava | Prague |
| 16:00 CEST (UTC+2) | Holeš 31' (yellow card) 82'; Kušej 45'; Douděra 74' | Report | Boula (yellow card) 65' | Stadium: Fortuna Arena; Attendance: 19,322; Referee: Karel Rouček |

=== Czech Cup ===
| 31 October 2024 Third Round | SK Benátky nad Jizerou | 1–4 | Slavia Prague | Prague |
| 14:00 CEST (UTC+2) | Poběrežský (yellow card) 70'; Žitka 90+2' | Report | Chytil 14'; Konečný 16'; Wallem 27'; Bužek 31'; Zmrzlý (yellow card) 36' | Stadium: Stadion Juliska; Attendance: 3,585; Referee: Jan Všetečka |

| 26 February 2025 Fourth Round | Slavia Prague | 1–0 | Silon Táborsko | Prague |
| 19:30 CET (UTC+1) | Chytil 114' | Report | Hák (yellow card) 53' | Stadium: Fortuna Arena; Attendance: 9,612; Referee: Vojtěch Opočenský |

| 2 April 2025 Quarter-finals | Slavia Prague | 0–1 | Sigma Olomouc | Prague |
| 18:00 CEST (UTC+2) | Zmrzlý (yellow card) 45+3'; Teah (yellow card) 72'; Chorý (yellow card) 90+9' | Report | Kliment 28' (yellow card) 54'; Zorvan (yellow card) 47'; Koutný (yellow card) 50'; Dolžnikov (yellow card) 90+1' | Stadium: Fortuna Arena; Attendance: 13,158; Referee: Jan Beneš |

=== UEFA Champions League ===
==== Qualifying rounds ====
| 7 August 2024 Third qualifying round 1st leg | Slavia Prague (Czech Republic) | 3–1 | (Belgium) Union Saint-Gilloise | Prague, Czechia |
| 19:00 CEST (UTC+2) | Chorý 19', 41'; Dorley 57' (yellow card) 85'; Provod (yellow card) 68' | Report | Vanhoutte (yellow card) 43'; Cameron Puertas (yellow card) 53'; Bužek 72' (o.g.); Fuseini (red card) 85'; Moris (yellow card) 86'; Teklab (yellow card) 88' | Stadium: Fortuna Arena; Attendance: 18,470; Referee: Tobias Stieler (Germany) |

| 13 August 2024 Third qualifying round 2nd leg | Union Saint-Gilloise (Belgium) | 0–1 (1–4 agg.) | (Czech Republic) Slavia Prague | Brussels, Belgium |
| 20:30 CEST (UTC+2) | Vanhoutte (yellow card) 42'; David (yellow card) 78' | Report | Zima (yellow card) 15'; Diouf (yellow card) 63'; Jurečka 84' | Stadium: Constant Vanden Stock Stadium; Attendance: 5,499; Referee: Srđan Jovanović (Serbia) |
Note: Union Saint-Gilloise played their home match at the Constant Vanden Stock Stadium, instead of their regular stadium, the Joseph Marien Stadium, which did not meet UEFA requirements.

| 20 August 2024 Playoff round 2nd leg | Lille (France) | 2–0 | (Czech Republic) Slavia Prague | Valenciennes, France |
| 21:00 CEST (UTC+2) | Meunier (yellow card) 18'; David 52'; Zhegrova 77'; Diakité (yellow card) 89'; Ilić (yellow card) 90+5' | Report | Masopust (yellow card) 35'; Dorley (yellow card) 66' | Stadium: Stade du Hainaut; Attendance: 15,019; Referee: Szymon Marciniak (Poland) |

| 28 August 2024 Playoff round 1st leg | Slavia Prague (Czech Republic) | 2–1 (2–3 agg.) | (France) Lille | Prague, Czechia |
| 21:00 CEST (UTC+2) | Zafeiris 5'; Ogbu (yellow card) 17'; Diouf (yellow card) 41'; Bořil (yellow card) 50'; Schranz 84' | Report | Haraldsson (yellow card) 42'; Tiago Santos (yellow card) 43'; Zhegrova 77' | Stadium: Fortuna Arena; Attendance: 18,848; Referee: Slavko Vinčić (Slovenia) |

=== UEFA Europa League ===
==== League Phase ====
| Pos | Team | Pld | W | D | L | GF | GA | GD | Pts |
|---|---|---|---|---|---|---|---|---|---|
| 28 | (Turkish Football Federation) Beşiktaş | 8 | 3 | 0 | 5 | 10 | 15 | −5 | 9 |
| 29 | (Israel Football Association) Maccabi Tel Aviv | 8 | 2 | 0 | 6 | 8 | 17 | −9 | 6 |
| 30 | (Football Association of the Czech Republic) Slavia Prague | 8 | 1 | 2 | 5 | 7 | 11 | −4 | 5 |
| 31 | (Swedish Football Association) Malmö FF | 8 | 1 | 2 | 5 | 10 | 17 | −7 | 5 |
| 32 | (Latvian Football Federation) RFS | 8 | 1 | 2 | 5 | 6 | 13 | −7 | 5 |

Source: UEFA
Rules for classification: League phase tiebreakers

| 25 September 2024 1 | Ludogorets Razgrad (Bulgaria) | 0–2 | (Czech Republic) Slavia Prague | Razgrad, Bulgaria |
| 21:00 CEST (UTC+2) | | Report | Jurásek 37'; Chytil 65' | Stadium: Huvepharma Arena; Attendance: 4,761; Referee: Jérôme Brisard (France) |

| 3 October 2024 2 | Slavia Prague (Czech Republic) | 1–1 | (Netherlands) Ajax | Prague, Czechia |
| 18:45 CEST (UTC+2) | Chorý 67' | Report | Van den Boomen 18' (pen.) | Stadium: Fortuna Arena; Attendance: 19,296; Referee: Andris Treimanis (Latvia) |

| 24 October 2024 3 | Athletic Bilbao (Spain) | 1–0 | (Czech Republic) Slavia Prague | Bilbao, Spain |
| 21:00 CEST (UTC+2) | N.Williams 33' | Report | | Stadium: San Mamés; Attendance: 47,776; Referee: Morten Krogh (Denmark) |

| 7 November 2024 4 | Eintracht Frankfurt (Germany) | 1–0 | (Czech Republic) Slavia Prague | Frankfurt, Germany |
| 18:45 CET (UTC+1) | Marmoush 53' | Report | | Stadium: Waldstadion; Attendance: 57,350; Referee: Chris Kavanagh (England) |

| 28 November 2024 5 | Slavia Prague (Czech Republic) | 1–2 | (Turkey) Fenerbahçe | Prague, Czechia |
| 21:00 CET (UTC+1) | Chorý 7' | Report | Džeko 35'; En-Nesyri 85' | Stadium: Fortuna Arena; Attendance: 19,308; Referee: Sascha Stegemann (Germany) |

| 12 December 2024 6 | Slavia Prague (Czech Republic) | 1–2 | (Belgium) Anderlecht | Prague, Czechia |
| 21:00 CET (UTC+1) | Douděra (yellow card) 54'; Chorý 58'; Lingr (yellow card) 89' | Report | Angulo 8'; Verschaeren 31'; Leoni (yellow card) 53'; Simić (yellow card) 77'; Dolberg (yellow card) 90+2' | Stadium: Fortuna Arena; Attendance: 19,167; Referee: Anastasios Papapetrou (Greece) |

| 23 January 2025 7 | PAOK (Greece) | 2–0 | (Czech Republic) Slavia Prague | Thessaloniki, Greece |
| 22:00 CET (UTC+1) | Schwab 26' (pen.); Jonny (yellow card) 41'; Konstantelias 56'; Despodov (yellow card) 59' | Report | Douděra (yellow card) 24'; Ogbu (yellow card) 65'; Chytil (yellow card) 90+5' | Stadium: Toumba Stadium; Attendance: 17,507; Referee: Matej Jug (Slovenia) |

| 30 January 2025 8 | Slavia Prague (Czech Republic) | 2–2 | (Sweden) Malmö FF | Prague, Czechia |
| 21:00 CET (UTC+1) | Dorley (yellow card) 37'; Chorý 46' (yellow card) 90+3'; Konečný (yellow card) 58'; Schranz 76'; Zafeiris (yellow card) 90' | Report | Berg Johnsen (yellow card) 65'; Ali 69'; Bolin 71'; Gabriel Busanello (yellow card) 88'; Loukili (yellow card) 90+2' | Stadium: Fortuna Arena; Attendance: 17,026; Referee: Allard Lindhout (Netherlands) |

== Squad statistics ==
As of match played 24 May 2025

=== Appearances and goals ===
| No. | Pos | Nat | Player | Total | | HET liga | | MOL Cup | | Champions League | | Europa League | |
| No. | Pos | Nat | Player | Apps | Goals | Apps | Goals | Apps | Goals | Apps | Goals | Apps | Goals |
|---|---|---|---|---|---|---|---|---|---|---|---|---|---|
| 1 | GK | (Czech Republic) CZE | Ondřej Kolář | 1 | 0 | 0+1 | 0 | 0 | 0 | 0 | 0 | 0 | 0 |
| 2 | DF | (Czech Republic) CZE | Štěpán Chaloupek | 22 | 0 | 5+12 | 0 | 2 | 0 | 0 | 0 | 0+3 | 0 |
| 3 | DF | (Czech Republic) CZE | Tomáš Holeš | 39 | 2 | 28 | 2 | 0+1 | 0 | 3 | 0 | 6+1 | 0 |
| 4 | DF | (Czech Republic) CZE | David Zima | 34 | 2 | 19+4 | 2 | 1 | 0 | 4 | 0 | 6 | 0 |
| 5 | DF | (Nigeria) NGR | Igoh Ogbu | 34 | 2 | 24+1 | 2 | 1+1 | 0 | 4 | 0 | 3 | 0 |
| 6 | MF | (Kenya) KEN | Timothy Ouma | 1 | 0 | 1 | 0 | 0 | 0 | 0 | 0 | 0 | 0 |
| 7 | FW | (Czech Republic) CZE | Milan Škoda | 2 | 0 | 0+2 | 0 | 0 | 0 | 0 | 0 | 0 | 0 |
| 9 | FW | (Czech Republic) CZE | Vasil Kušej | 15 | 10 | 7+6 | 10 | 1+1 | 0 | 0 | 0 | 0 | 0 |
| 10 | MF | (Greece) GRE | Christos Zafeiris | 43 | 6 | 27+3 | 5 | 1 | 0 | 4 | 1 | 6+2 | 0 |
| 12 | DF | (Senegal) SEN | El Hadji Malick Diouf | 41 | 7 | 23+4 | 7 | 0+2 | 0 | 4 | 0 | 6+2 | 0 |
| 13 | FW | (Czech Republic) CZE | Mojmír Chytil | 42 | 12 | 15+14 | 9 | 2 | 2 | 0+3 | 0 | 4+4 | 1 |
| 14 | MF | (Cameroon) CMR | Simion Michez | 17 | 1 | 3+4 | 1 | 2+1 | 0 | 0 | 0 | 5+2 | 0 |
| 16 | MF | (Nigeria) NGR | David Moses | 17 | 1 | 7+8 | 1 | 1+1 | 0 | 0 | 0 | 0 | 0 |
| 17 | MF | (Czech Republic) CZE | Lukáš Provod | 42 | 4 | 25+7 | 4 | 0 | 0 | 4 | 0 | 5+1 | 0 |
| 18 | DF | (Czech Republic) CZE | Jan Bořil | 32 | 1 | 23 | 1 | 0 | 0 | 1+3 | 0 | 5 | 0 |
| 19 | MF | (Liberia) LBR | Oscar Dorley | 42 | 5 | 29 | 4 | 1 | 0 | 4 | 1 | 8 | 0 |
| 20 | MF | (Greece) GRE | Giannis Fivos Botos | 15 | 1 | 2+11 | 1 | 2 | 0 | 0 | 0 | 0 | 0 |
| 21 | MF | (Czech Republic) CZE | David Douděra | 41 | 2 | 31 | 2 | 1+1 | 0 | 1+2 | 0 | 5 | 0 |
| 22 | FW | (Czech Republic) CZE | Lukáš Vorlický | 6 | 0 | 0+4 | 0 | 0 | 0 | 0+2 | 0 | 0 | 0 |
| 25 | FW | (Czech Republic) CZE | Tomáš Chorý | 45 | 20 | 24+8 | 14 | 0+2 | 0 | 4 | 2 | 4+3 | 4 |
| 26 | FW | (Slovakia) SVK | Ivan Schranz | 30 | 4 | 11+9 | 2 | 1+1 | 0 | 3+1 | 1 | 1+3 | 1 |
| 27 | DF | (Czech Republic) CZE | Tomáš Vlček | 8 | 0 | 5+2 | 0 | 0+1 | 0 | 0 | 0 | 0 | 0 |
| 29 | MF | (Liberia) LBR | Divine Teah | 10 | 0 | 0+8 | 0 | 0+2 | 0 | 0 | 0 | 0 | 0 |
| 30 | FW | (Czech Republic) CZE | Daniel Toula | 2 | 0 | 0+1 | 0 | 0+1 | 0 | 0 | 0 | 0 | 0 |
| 33 | DF | (Czech Republic) CZE | Ondřej Zmrzlý | 25 | 1 | 9+7 | 1 | 3 | 0 | 0 | 0 | 4+2 | 0 |
| 35 | GK | (Czech Republic) CZE | Jakub Markovič | 5 | 0 | 3 | 0 | 2 | 0 | 0 | 0 | 0 | 0 |
| 36 | GK | (Czech Republic) CZE | Jindřich Staněk | 13 | 0 | 13 | 0 | 0 | 0 | 0 | 0 | 0 | 0 |
| 46 | DF | (Czech Republic) CZE | Mikuláš Konečný | 8 | 1 | 0+3 | 0 | 3 | 1 | 0 | 0 | 2 | 0 |
| 48 | MF | (Czech Republic) CZE | Dominik Pech | 20 | 1 | 3+10 | 1 | 3 | 0 | 0 | 0 | 2+2 | 0 |
| 54 | DF | (Czech Republic) CZE | Jan Tredl | 1 | 0 | 0 | 0 | 1 | 0 | 0 | 0 | 0 | 0 |
Players away on loan:
| 6 | MF | (Norway) NOR | Conrad Wallem | 9 | 2 | 0+6 | 1 | 1 | 1 | 0 | 0 | 2 | 0 |
| 8 | MF | (Czech Republic) CZE | Lukáš Masopust | 5 | 0 | 1 | 0 | 0+1 | 0 | 3 | 0 | 0 | 0 |
| 20 | MF | (Czech Republic) CZE | Alexandr Bužek | 2 | 1 | 0 | 0 | 1 | 1 | 0+1 | 0 | 0 | 0 |
| 23 | MF | (Czech Republic) CZE | Petr Ševčík | 5 | 0 | 1+4 | 0 | 0 | 0 | 0 | 0 | 0 | 0 |
| 24 | GK | (Czech Republic) CZE | Aleš Mandous | 3 | 0 | 0 | 0 | 1 | 0 | 0 | 0 | 2 | 0 |
| 28 | MF | (Czech Republic) CZE | Filip Prebsl | 19 | 1 | 8+5 | 1 | 0 | 0 | 1+2 | 0 | 1+2 | 0 |
| 29 | DF | (Slovakia) SVK | Michal Tomič | 2 | 0 | 1+1 | 0 | 0 | 0 | 0 | 0 | 0 | 0 |
Players who left Slavia Prague during the season:
| 11 | FW | (Czech Republic) CZE | Daniel Fila | 9 | 1 | 3+1 | 1 | 0+1 | 0 | 0 | 0 | 1+3 | 0 |
| 15 | FW | (Czech Republic) CZE | Václav Jurečka | 3 | 2 | 2 | 1 | 0 | 0 | 0+1 | 1 | 0 | 0 |
| 31 | GK | (Czech Republic) CZE | Antonín Kinský | 29 | 0 | 19 | 0 | 0 | 0 | 4 | 0 | 6 | 0 |
| 32 | MF | (Czech Republic) CZE | Ondřej Lingr | 24 | 1 | 8+8 | 1 | 1 | 0 | 0 | 0 | 3+4 | 0 |
| 35 | MF | (Czech Republic) CZE | Matěj Jurásek | 23 | 2 | 5+8 | 1 | 1 | 0 | 0+3 | 0 | 1+5 | 1 |

=== Goal scorers ===
| Place | Position | Nation | Number | Name | HET liga | MOL Cup | Champions League | Europa League | Total |
|---|---|---|---|---|---|---|---|---|---|
| 1 | FW | (Czech Republic) | 25 | Tomáš Chorý | 14 | 0 | 2 | 4 | 20 |
| 2 | FW | (Czech Republic) | 13 | Mojmír Chytil | 9 | 2 | 0 | 1 | 12 |
| 3 | FW | (Czech Republic) | 9 | Vasil Kušej | 10 | 0 | 0 | 0 | 10 |
| 4 | DF | (Senegal) | 12 | El Hadji Malick Diouf | 7 | 0 | 0 | 0 | 7 |
| 5 | MF | (Greece) | 10 | Christos Zafeiris | 5 | 0 | 1 | 0 | 6 |
| 6 | MF | (Liberia) | 19 | Oscar Dorley | 4 | 0 | 1 | 0 | 5 |
| 7 | MF | (Czech Republic) | 17 | Lukáš Provod | 4 | 0 | 0 | 0 | 4 |
| 7 | MF | (Slovakia) | 26 | Ivan Schranz | 2 | 0 | 1 | 1 | 4 |
| 9 | DF | (Czech Republic) | 4 | David Zima | 2 | 0 | 0 | 0 | 2 |
| 9 | DF | (Nigeria) | 5 | Igoh Ogbu | 2 | 0 | 0 | 0 | 2 |
| 9 | DF | (Czech Republic) | 3 | Tomáš Holeš | 2 | 0 | 0 | 0 | 2 |
| 9 | MF | (Czech Republic) | 21 | David Douděra | 2 | 0 | 0 | 0 | 2 |
| 9 | MF | (Norway) | 6 | Conrad Wallem | 1 | 1 | 0 | 0 | 2 |
| 9 | FW | (Czech Republic) | 15 | Václav Jurečka | 1 | 0 | 1 | 0 | 2 |
| 9 | MF | (Czech Republic) | 35 | Matěj Jurásek | 1 | 0 | 0 | 1 | 2 |
| 9 | | | | Own goal | 2 | 0 | 0 | 0 | 2 |
| 17 | FW | (Czech Republic) | 11 | Daniel Fila | 1 | 0 | 0 | 0 | 1 |
| 17 | MF | (Czech Republic) | 28 | Filip Prebsl | 1 | 0 | 0 | 0 | 1 |
| 17 | DF | (Czech Republic) | 18 | Jan Bořil | 1 | 0 | 0 | 0 | 1 |
| 17 | MF | (Cameroon) | 14 | Simion Michez | 1 | 0 | 0 | 0 | 1 |
| 17 | MF | (Czech Republic) | 32 | Ondřej Lingr | 1 | 0 | 0 | 0 | 1 |
| 17 | MF | (Czech Republic) | 48 | Dominik Pech | 1 | 0 | 0 | 0 | 1 |
| 17 | MF | (Greece) | 20 | Giannis Fivos Botos | 1 | 0 | 0 | 0 | 1 |
| 17 | MF | (Nigeria) | 16 | David Moses | 1 | 0 | 0 | 0 | 1 |
| 17 | DF | (Czech Republic) | 33 | Ondřej Zmrzlý | 1 | 0 | 0 | 0 | 1 |
| 17 | MF | (Czech Republic) | 46 | Mikuláš Konečný | 0 | 1 | 0 | 0 | 1 |
| 17 | MF | (Czech Republic) | 20 | Alexandr Bužek | 0 | 1 | 0 | 0 | 1 |
| | | | | TOTALS | 77 | 5 | 6 | 7 | 95 |

=== Clean sheets ===
| Place | Position | Nation | Number | Name | HET liga | MOL Cup | Champions League | Europa League | Total |
|---|---|---|---|---|---|---|---|---|---|
| 1 | GK | (Czech Republic) | 31 | Antonín Kinský | 12 | 0 | 1 | 1 | 14 |
| 2 | GK | (Czech Republic) | 36 | Jindřich Staněk | 10 | 0 | 0 | 0 | 10 |
| 3 | GK | (Czech Republic) | 1 | Ondřej Kolář | 1 | 0 | 0 | 0 | 1 |
| 3 | GK | (Czech Republic) | 35 | Jakub Markovič | 0 | 1 | 0 | 0 | 1 |
| | | | | TOTALS | 22 | 1 | 1 | 1 | 25 |

Jindřich Staněk & Ondřej Kolář both played in Slavia's 5-0 victory over Sigma Olomouc on 26 April 2025

=== Disciplinary record ===
| Number | Nation | Position | Name | HET liga | | MOL Cup | | Champions League | | Europa League | | Total | |
| Number | Nation | Position | Name | Yellow card | Red card | Yellow card | Red card | Yellow card | Red card | Yellow card | Red card | Yellow card | Red card |
| 2 | (Czech Republic) | DF | Štěpán Chaloupek | 2 | 0 | 0 | 0 | 0 | 0 | 0 | 0 | 2 | 0 |
| 3 | (Czech Republic) | DF | Tomáš Holeš | 2 | 0 | 0 | 0 | 0 | 0 | 1 | 0 | 3 | 0 |
| 4 | (Czech Republic) | DF | David Zima | 0 | 0 | 0 | 0 | 1 | 0 | 0 | 0 | 1 | 0 |
| 5 | (Nigeria) | DF | Igoh Ogbu | 5 | 0 | 0 | 0 | 1 | 0 | 1 | 0 | 7 | 0 |
| 10 | (Greece) | MF | Christos Zafeiris | 4 | 0 | 0 | 0 | 0 | 0 | 3 | 0 | 7 | 0 |
| 12 | (Senegal) | DF | El Hadji Malick Diouf | 4 | 0 | 0 | 0 | 2 | 0 | 2 | 0 | 8 | 0 |
| 13 | (Czech Republic) | FW | Mojmír Chytil | 0 | 1 | 0 | 0 | 0 | 0 | 1 | 0 | 1 | 1 |
| 14 | (Cameroon) | MF | Simion Michez | 1 | 0 | 0 | 0 | 0 | 0 | 0 | 0 | 1 | 0 |
| 17 | (Czech Republic) | MF | Lukáš Provod | 2 | 0 | 0 | 0 | 1 | 0 | 1 | 0 | 4 | 0 |
| 18 | (Czech Republic) | DF | Jan Bořil | 6 | 0 | 0 | 0 | 1 | 0 | 2 | 0 | 9 | 0 |
| 19 | (Liberia) | MF | Oscar Dorley | 5 | 1 | 0 | 0 | 2 | 0 | 1 | 0 | 8 | 1 |
| 21 | (Czech Republic) | MF | David Douděra | 8 | 0 | 0 | 0 | 0 | 0 | 3 | 0 | 11 | 0 |
| 25 | (Czech Republic) | FW | Tomáš Chorý | 6 | 0 | 1 | 0 | 0 | 0 | 3 | 0 | 10 | 0 |
| 26 | (Slovakia) | FW | Ivan Schranz | 2 | 0 | 0 | 0 | 0 | 0 | 0 | 0 | 2 | 0 |
| 27 | (Czech Republic) | DF | Tomáš Vlček | 1 | 0 | 0 | 0 | 0 | 0 | 0 | 0 | 1 | 0 |
| 29 | (Liberia) | MF | Divine Teah | 0 | 0 | 1 | 0 | 0 | 0 | 0 | 0 | 1 | 0 |
| 33 | (Czech Republic) | DF | Ondřej Zmrzlý | 1 | 0 | 2 | 0 | 0 | 0 | 0 | 0 | 3 | 0 |
| 46 | (Czech Republic) | DF | Mikuláš Konečný | 0 | 0 | 0 | 0 | 0 | 0 | 1 | 0 | 1 | 0 |
Slavia Prague B Players:
Players away on loan:
| 6 | (Norway) | MF | Conrad Wallem | 1 | 0 | 0 | 0 | 0 | 0 | 0 | 0 | 1 | 0 |
| 8 | (Czech Republic) | MF | Lukáš Masopust | 0 | 0 | 0 | 0 | 1 | 0 | 0 | 0 | 1 | 0 |
| 28 | (Czech Republic) | MF | Filip Prebsl | 2 | 1 | 0 | 0 | 0 | 0 | 1 | 0 | 3 | 1 |
Players who left Slavia Prague during the season:
| 31 | (Czech Republic) | GK | Antonín Kinský | 1 | 0 | 0 | 0 | 0 | 0 | 0 | 0 | 1 | 0 |
| 32 | (Czech Republic) | MF | Ondřej Lingr | 2 | 0 | 0 | 0 | 0 | 0 | 1 | 0 | 3 | 0 |
| 35 | (Czech Republic) | MF | Matěj Jurásek | 0 | 0 | 0 | 0 | 0 | 0 | 1 | 0 | 1 | 0 |
| | | | TOTALS | 55 | 3 | 4 | 0 | 9 | 0 | 22 | 0 | 90 | 3 |
