= Simion Michez =

Cameroonian footballer (born 2002)

Personal information
- Full name: Simion Boubacar Michez
- Date of birth: 9 February 2002 (age 24)
- Place of birth: Charleroi, Belgium
- Height: 1.78 m (5 ft 10 in)
- Position: Winger

Team information
- Current team: Mechelen
- Number: 23

Youth career
- 2007–2008: Olympic Charleroi
- 2008–2022: Anderlecht

Senior career*
Years	Team	Apps	(Gls)
2022–2023	RSCA Futures	26	(3)
2023–2024	Beerschot	35	(7)
2024–2026	Slavia Prague	7	(1)
2024–2026	Slavia Prague B	8	(3)
2025	→ Sigma Olomouc (loan)	11	(0)
2026–	Mechelen	0	(0)

International career^{‡}
2017	Belgium U15	1	(0)
2019	Belgium U17	5	(1)
2021	Cameroon U23	1	(1)
- * Club domestic league appearances and goals as of 14 December 2025 ‡ National team caps and goals as of 14:32, 4 October 2024 (UTC)

Simion Boubacar Michez (born 9 February 2002) is a professional footballer who plays as a winger for Belgian Pro League club Mechelen. Born in Belgium, he is a youth international for Cameroon.

== Club career ==
Michez began playing football with Olympic Charleroi, before moving to the youth academy of Anderlecht in 2008 where he finished his development. On 13 May 2020, he signed his first professional contract with Anderlecht. On 1 February 2022 he signed his first professional contract with the club until 2023, and began his senior career with Anderlecht's reserves in the Challenger Pro League. On 17 May 2023, he transferred to Beerschot and helped them win the 2023–24 Challenger Pro League, earning promotion to the Belgian Pro League.

On 3 September 2024, Michez signed with the Czech First League club Slavia Prague on a contract until 2028.

On 18 July 2025, Michez joined Sigma Olomouc on a one-year loan deal.

On 27 August 2026, Michez signed a contract with Belgian Pro League club Mechelen until 2029.

== International career ==
Born in Belgium, Michez was born to a Cameroonian father and Senegalese mother and holds all three nationalities. He is a former youth international for Belgium having played for the Belgium U15s and Belgium U17s from 2017 to 2019. He was called up to a training camp for the Cameroon U23s in 2021 where he scored a goal.

== Career statistics ==
=== Club ===
As of 3 March 2026

Appearances and goals by club, season and competition
Club	Season	League			Cup		Europe		Other		Total			
Club	Season	Division	Apps	Goals	Apps	Goals	Apps	Goals	Apps	Goals	Apps	Goals		
RSCA Futures	2022–23	Challenger Pro League	26	3	—		—		—		26	3		
Beerschot	2023–24	Challenger Pro League	29	5	2	1	—		—		31	6		
Beerschot	2024–25	Belgian Pro League	6	2	0	0	—		—		6	2		
Beerschot	Total		35	7	2	1	—		—		37	8		
Slavia Prague	2024–25	Czech First League	7	1	2	0	7 (Note: Appearances in UEFA Europa League)	0	—		16	1		
Slavia Prague	2025–26	Czech First League	0	0	1	0	—		—		1	0		
Slavia Prague	Total		7	1	3	0	7	0	—		—		17	0
Slavia Prague B	2024–25	Czech National Football League	8	3	—		—		—		8	3		
Sigma Olomouc (loan)	2025–26	Czech First League	11	0	1	0	3 (Note: One appearance in UEFA Europa League, two appearances in UEFA Conference League)	0	—		15	0		
Career total			87	14	5	1	10	0	0	0	102	15		

== Honours ==
Beerschot

- Challenger Pro League: 2023–24

Slavia • Chance Liga: 2024-25
