= El Hadji Malick Diouf =

Senegalese footballer (born 2004)

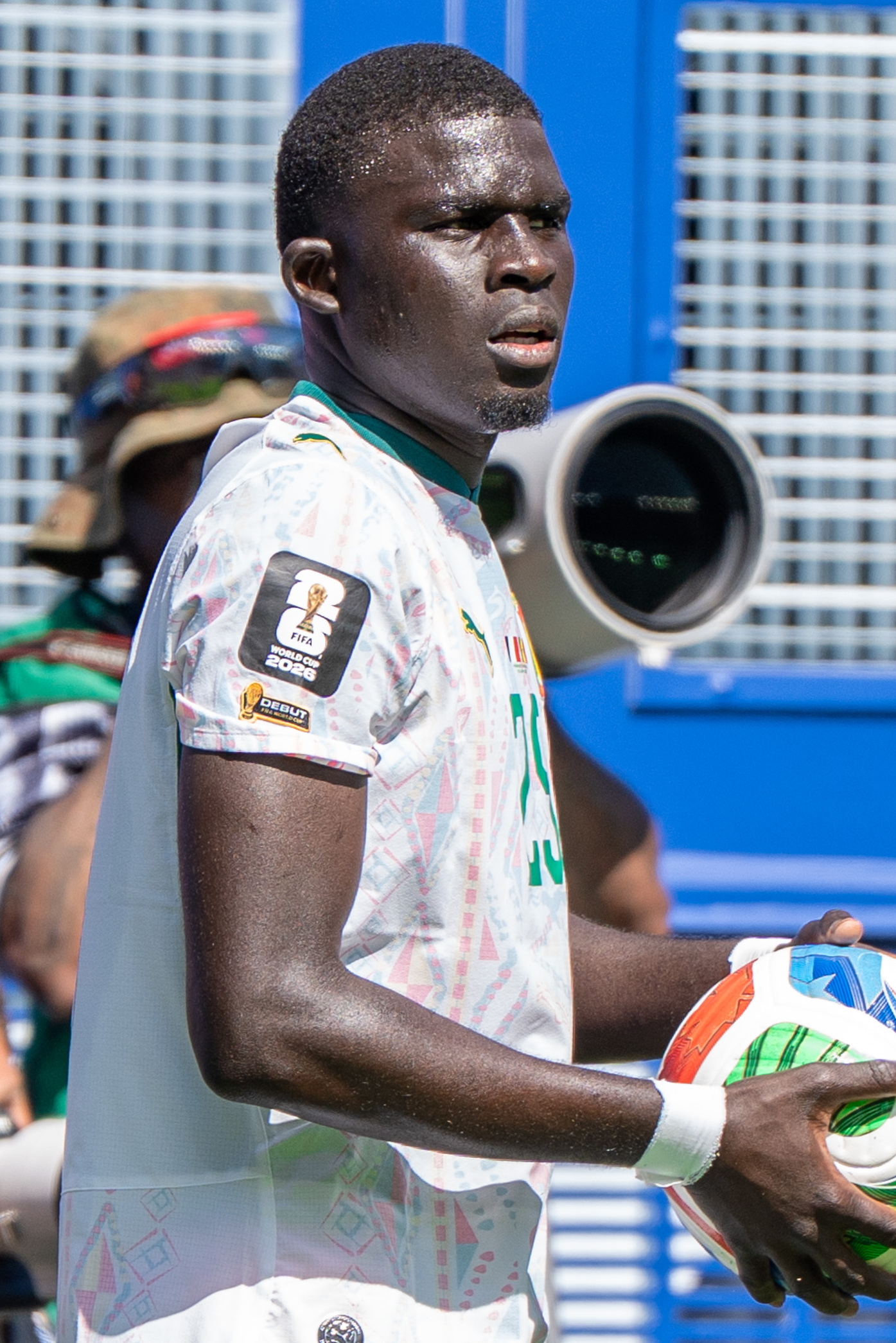
- Diouf with Senegal in 2026

Personal information
- Full name: El Hadji Malick Diouf
- Date of birth: 28 December 2004 (age 21)
- Place of birth: Dakar, Senegal
- Height: 1.83 m (6 ft 0 in)
- Positions: Left-back; left wing-back

Team information
- Current team: Brentford
- Number: 25

Youth career
- Galaxy Football Academy
- Académie Mawade Wade

Senior career*
| Years | Team | Apps | (Gls) |
| 2023–2024 | Tromsø | 15 | (2) |
| 2024–2025 | Slavia Prague | 34 | (8) |
| 2025–2026 | West Ham United | 33 | (0) |
| 2026– | Brentford | 1 | (0) |

International career^{‡}
- Senegal U17
- Senegal U20
| 2024– | Senegal | 27 | (2) |
Medal record
Men's football
Representing Senegal
Africa Cup of Nations
| Runner-up | 2025 |
- * Club domestic league appearances and goals as of 15:23, 26 August 2026 (UTC) ‡ National team caps and goals as of 23:59, 16 November 2026 (UTC)

El Hadji Malick Diouf (born 28 December 2004) is a Senegalese professional footballer who plays as a left-back or left wing-back for Premier Lеague club Brentford and the Senegal national team.

== Club career ==
=== Tromsø ===
Born in Dakar, Diouf began his footballing journey at just 13 years old with the Galaxy Football Academy. After a successful stint of four years, he joined the Academie Mawade Wade. On 21 February 2023, after a successful trial, Diouf signed with Norwegian side Tromsø. After a slow start to the season, with little game time, the latter half of the season saw Diouf getting regular game time, ending the season with twenty-one appearances, and three goals for the club.

=== Slavia Prague ===
In January 2024, Diouf signed for Czech top flight club Slavia Prague on a four-and-a-half-year contract. His first goal for the club came in his debut game, against Karviná. In the 2024–25 season for Slavia Prague, Diouf played as a left wing-back as they won the Czech First League title. He scored five goals in the first eight games and in 24 league appearances for the season, scored seven goals and made three assists.

=== West Ham United ===
On 15 July 2025, Diouf signed for Premier League club West Ham United on a long-term contract for a fee of £19m. On 16 August 2025, he made his competitive debut, in a 3–0 loss to Sunderland at the Stadium of Light.

=== Brentford ===
Diouf signed a five year deal with Brentford on 28 August 2026.

== International career ==
Prior to making his debut for the senior team, Diouf represented Senegal at under-17 and under-20 level. Diouf's performances for Senegal's youth sides drew him to the attention of Tromsø's sporting director Tore Rismo.

Diouf made his debut for the Senegal national team on 9 September 2024 in a Africa Cup of Nations qualifier against Burundi at the Bingu National Stadium in Malawi.

Diouf scored his first international goal on 18 November 2025 in a friendly match against Kenya. He started the match and helped his team secure an 8–0 victory.

On 21 May 2026, Diouf was officially named in Senegal manager Pape Thiaw's 28-man squad for the 2026 FIFA World Cup.

== Personal life ==
Diouf is a Muslim.

== Career statistics ==
=== Club ===
As of match played 16 August 2026

Appearances and goals by club, season and competition
| Club | Season | League | | | National cup (Note: Includes Norwegian Cup, Czech Cup, FA Cup) | | League cup (Note: Includes EFL Cup) | | Europe | | Total | |
| Club | Season | Division | Apps | Goals | Apps | Goals | Apps | Goals | Apps | Goals | Apps | Goals |
|---|---|---|---|---|---|---|---|---|---|---|---|---|
| Tromsø | 2023 | Eliteserien | 15 | 2 | 6 | 1 | — | | — | | 21 | 3 |
| Slavia Prague | 2023–24 | Czech First League | 7 | 1 | 1 | 1 | — | | 1 (Note: Appearance in UEFA Europa League) | 0 | 9 | 2 |
| Slavia Prague | 2024–25 | Czech First League | 27 | 7 | 2 | 0 | — | | 12 (Note: Four appearances in UEFA Champions League, eight appearances in UEFA Europa League) | 0 | 41 | 7 |
| Slavia Prague | Total | | 34 | 8 | 3 | 1 | — | | 13 | 0 | 50 | 9 |
| West Ham United | 2025–26 | Premier League | 32 | 0 | 1 | 0 | 1 | 0 | — | | 34 | 0 |
| West Ham United | 2026–27 | Championship | 1 | 0 | — | | 1 | 0 | — | | 2 | 0 |
| West Ham United | Total | | 33 | 0 | 1 | 0 | 2 | 0 | — | | 36 | 0 |
| Brentford | 2026–27 | Premier League | 0 | 0 | 0 | 0 | 0 | 0 | — | | 0 | 0 |
| Career total | | | 82 | 10 | 10 | 2 | 2 | 0 | 13 | 0 | 107 | 12 |

=== International ===
As of match played 16 November 2026

Appearances and goals by national team and year
| National team | Year | Apps | Goals |
|---|---|---|---|
| Senegal | 2024 | 4 | 0 |
| Senegal | 2025 | 9 | 1 |
| Senegal | 2026 | 14 | 1 |
| Total | | 27 | 2 |

Senegal score listed first, score column indicates score after each Diouf goal.

List of international goals scored by El Hadji Malick Diouf
| No. | Date | Venue | Cap | Opponent | Score | Result | Competition |
|---|---|---|---|---|---|---|---|
| 1 | 18 November 2025 | Antalya Stadium, Antalya, Turkey | 12 | Kenya | 2–0 | 8–0 | Friendly |
| 2 | 16 November 2026 | Juba National Stadium, Juba, South Sudan | 27 | Sudan | 2–0 | 4–2 | 2027 Africa Cup of Nations qualification |
