= Jakub Markovič =

Czech footballer (born 2001)

- Markovič in 2026

Personal information
- Date of birth: 13 July 2001 (age 25)
- Place of birth: Přerov, Czech Republic
- Height: 1.87 m (6 ft 2 in)
- Position: Goalkeeper

Team information
- Current team: Slavia Prague
- Number: 31

Youth career
- Slavia Prague

Senior career*
Years	Team	Apps	(Gls)
2019–2023	Slavia Prague	2	(0)
2019–2020	Slavia Prague B	8	(0)
2020–2021	→ Mladá Boleslav (loan)	1	(0)
2020	→ Mladá Boleslav B (loan)	1	(0)
2021	→ Vlašim	7	(0)
2021–2023	→ Pardubice (loan)	30	(0)
2021–2023	→ Pardubice B (loan)	3	(0)
2023–2025	Baník Ostrava	21	(0)
2025–	Slavia Prague	30	(0)
2025	Slavia Prague B	7	(0)

International career
2016	Czech Republic U15	1	(0)
2016–2017	Czech Republic U16	6	(0)
2017–2018	Czech Republic U17	10	(0)
2018–2019	Czech Republic U18	7	(0)
2019–2020	Czech Republic U19	7	(0)
2022	Czech Republic U21	1	(0)
- * Club domestic league appearances and goals as of 17 October 2026

Jakub Markovič (born 13 July 2001) is a Czech professional footballer who plays as a goalkeeper for Czech First League club Slavia Prague.

== Life ==
Markovič was born on 13 July 2001 in Přerov.

== Club career ==
Markovič debuted for Slavia Prague on 24 August 2019 in a 4–0 Czech First League victory against Bohemians 1905, becoming the second youngest goalkeeper to debut for Slavia, and the youngest to keep a clean sheet.

Spending time on loan in FK Pardubice, Markovič played an important role in keeping clean sheets in the 2021–22 Czech First League relegation group.

On 3 July 2023, Markovič signed a four-year contract with Baník Ostrava. He took part in the 2024–25 UEFA Conference League qualifying. In the decisive match against FC Copenhagen, Markovič was the standout player in his team, saving two penalties in the penalty shootout. Copenhagen won 2–1, however, because Markovič' teammates missed four out of their five penalties.

On 7 January 2025, Markovič returned to Slavia Prague following the activation of his buy-back clause, signing a four-and-a-half year deal.

== International career ==
Markovič represented Czech youth teams ranging from U15, U16, U17, U18, U19 until U21. In 2024, he was called up to the Czech Republic national team for the first time.

== Career statistics ==
=== Club ===
As of 20 October 2026

Appearances and goals by club, season and competition
Club	Season	League			Czech Cup		Continental		Other		Total	
Club	Season	Division	Apps	Goals	Apps	Goals	Apps	Goals	Apps	Goals	Apps	Goals
Slavia Prague	2019–20	Czech First League	2	0	1	0	0	0	—		3	0
Mladá Boleslav (loan)	2020–21	Czech First League	1	0	2	0	—		—		3	0
Vlašim	2020–21	Czech National Football League	7	0	0	0	—		—		7	0
Pardubice (loan)	2021–22	Czech First League	16	0	0	0	—		—		16	0
Pardubice (loan)	2022–23	Czech First League	18	0	0	0	—		—		18	0
Pardubice (loan)	Total		34	0	0	0	—		—		34	0
Baník Ostrava	2023–24	Czech First League	3	0	3	0	—		—		6	0
Baník Ostrava	2024–25	Czech First League	18	0	0	0	3 (Note: Appearances in UEFA Conference League)	0	—		21	0
Baník Ostrava	Total		21	0	3	0	3	0	—		27	0
Slavia Prague	2024–25	Czech First League	3	0	2	0	—		—		5	0
Slavia Prague	2025–26	Czech First League	16	0	3	0	2 (Note: Appearances in UEFA Champions League)	0	—		21	0
Slavia Prague	2026–27	Czech First League	11	0	0	0	3	0	—		14	0
Slavia Prague	Total		30	0	5	0	5	0	—		40	0
Slavia Prague B	2024–25	Czech National Football League	2	0	—		—		—		2	0
Slavia Prague B	2025–26	Czech National Football League	2	0	—		—		—		2	0
Slavia Prague B	Total		4	0	—		—		—		4	0
Career total			99	0	11	0	8	0	0	0	118	0

== Honours ==
Slavia Prague

- Czech First League: 2019–20, 2024–25, 2025–26
- Czech-Slovak Supercup: 2019
