= Alexandr Bužek =

Czech footballer (born 2004)

Personal information
- Date of birth: 2 August 2004 (age 22)
- Place of birth: Zlín, Czech Republic
- Height: 1.80 m (5 ft 11 in)
- Position: Defensive midfielder

Team information
- Current team: Slovan Liberec

Youth career
- 2011–2023: Zlín

Senior career*
Years	Team	Apps	(Gls)
2023–2024	Zlín	27	(1)
2024–	Slavia Prague	6	(0)
2024–2026	Slavia Prague B	11	(0)
2025	→ Karviná (loan)	25	(0)
2026–	Slovan Liberec	0	(0)

International career^{‡}
2023	Czech Republic U19	1	(0)
2023–2025	Czech Republic U20	10	(0)
2025–	Czech Republic U21	5	(0)
- * Club domestic league appearances and goals as of 24 May 2026 ‡ National team caps and goals as of 18 November 2025

Alexandr Bužek (born 2 August 2004) is a Czech professional footballer who plays as a defensive midfielder for Czech First League club Slovan Liberec.

== Club career ==
Bužek is a pure youth product of FC Zlín, having worked his way up all their youth categories. He made his senior and professional debut with the club as a substitute in a 1–1 Czech First League tie with Slovan Liberec on 12 August 2023. On 16 June 2024, he transferred to Slavia Prague signing a four-year contract.

On 31 January 2025, Bužek joined Karviná on a half-year loan deal.

On 27 June 2025, Bužek signed a five-year contract with Slovan Liberec.

== International career ==
Bužekis a youth international for the Czech Republic, having been called up to the Czech Republic U19s in 2023.

== Personal life ==
Bužek's father Libor and grandfather Petr were also professional footballers.

== Career statistics ==
As of match played 24 May 2026

Appearances and goals by club, season and competition
Club	Season	League			Czech Cup		Europe		Total	
Club	Season	Division	Apps	Goals	Apps	Goals	Apps	Goals	Apps	Goals
Zlín	2023–24	Czech First League	27	1	4	0	—		31	1
Slavia Prague	2024–25	Czech First League	0	0	1	1	1 (Note: Appearance in UEFA Champions League)	0	2	1
Slavia Prague	2025–26	Czech First League	5	0	0	0	—		5	0
Slavia Prague	Total		5	0	1	1	1	0	7	1
Slavia Prague B	2024–25	Czech National Football League	9	0	—		—		9	0
Slavia Prague B	2025–26	Czech National Football League	2	0	—		—		2	0
Slavia Prague B	Total		11	0	—		—		11	0
Karviná (loan)	2024–25	Czech First League	12	0	0	0	—		12	0
Karviná (loan)	2025–26	Czech First League	14	1	3	1	—		17	2
Karviná (loan)	Total		26	1	3	1	—		29	2
Career total			68	2	8	2	1	0	76	4

== Honours ==
Slavia Prague

- Czech First League: 2025–26
