= Divine Teah =

Liberian footballer (born 2006)

Personal information
- Full name: Divine Roosevelt Teah
- Date of birth: 19 April 2006 (age 20)
- Place of birth: Brewerville, Liberia
- Height: 1.76 m (5 ft 9 in)
- Position: Midfielder

Team information
- Current team: Slavia Prague
- Number: 21

Senior career*
| Years | Team | Apps | (Gls) |
| 2021–2024 | Nimba FC | 6 | (2) |
| 2024–2025 | Hammarby IF | 7 | (0) |
| 2025– | Slavia Prague | 11 | (0) |
| 2025– | → Slavia Prague B | 11 | (0) |
| 2025 | → Pardubice (loan) | 6 | (0) |

International career^{‡}
| 2023– | Liberia | 29 | (2) |
- * Club domestic league appearances and goals as of 9 November 2026 ‡ National team caps and goals as of 29 September 2026

Divine Roosevelt Teah (born 19 April 2006) is a Liberian professional footballer who plays as a midfielder for Slavia Prague and the Liberia national team.

== Club career ==
=== Nimba and Hammarby ===
Teah was called up from the Massa FA to play for Nimba FC. He scored his first two goals for Nimba in the 2021–22 season. On 11 October 2023, he was named by English newspaper The Guardian as one of the best players born in 2006 worldwide. During his time at Nimba, he was heavily linked with teams like AC Milan, Sporting CP, and Bayer Leverkusen, per Fabrizio Romano.

On 19 April 2024, Teah signed a four-year contract with the Swedish club Hammarby, the transfer will become official in the summer transfer window in July 2024. He made his Allsvenskan debut in the 1–0 loss to IFK Göteborg.

=== Slavia Prague ===
On 30 October 2024 it was announced by Hammarby that Teah, after making 7 substitute appearances in the league and a 90-minute appearance in a qualification match against IFK Stocksund in the Swedish Cup, was sold to the Czech club SK Slavia Prague for a sum that could reach close to 50 million Swedish krona. The deal was set to be made official on 1 January 2025. He signed a five-year contract, up until 31 December 2029. Fellow Liberian player Oscar Dorley, who was already at Slavia, claimed that he would help Teah adapt to the new league.

On 8 September 2025, Teah joined Pardubice on a half-year loan deal without an option.

== International career ==
Teah made his first cap for the Liberia national team against Benin. After 7 caps, he scored his first goal in the 3–1 loss against Ghana, which was assisted by DZ Harmon.

== Career statistics ==
=== Club ===
As of match played 6 May 2026

Appearances and goals by club, season and competition
| Club | Season | League | | | National cup (Note: Includes Svenska Cupen, Czech Cup) | | Continental | | Other | | Total | |
| Club | Season | Division | Apps | Goals | Apps | Goals | Apps | Goals | Apps | Goals | Apps | Goals |
|---|---|---|---|---|---|---|---|---|---|---|---|---|
| Nimba FC | 2023–24 | Liberian Second Division | 6 | 2 | — | | — | | — | | 6 | 2 |
| Hammarby | 2024 | Allsvenskan | 7 | 0 | 1 | 0 | — | | — | | 8 | 0 |
| Slavia Prague | 2024–25 | Czech First League | 8 | 0 | 2 | 0 | 0 | 0 | — | | 10 | 0 |
| Slavia Prague | 2025–26 | Czech First League | 2 | 0 | 0 | 0 | 0 | 0 | — | | 2 | 0 |
| Slavia Prague | Total | | 10 | 0 | 2 | 0 | 0 | 0 | — | | 12 | 0 |
| Slavia Prague B | 2024–25 | Czech National Football League | 1 | 0 | — | | — | | — | | 1 | 0 |
| Slavia Prague B | 2025–26 | Czech National Football League | 10 | 0 | — | | — | | — | | 10 | 0 |
| Slavia Prague B | Total | | 11 | 0 | — | | — | | — | | 11 | 0 |
| Pardubice (loan) | 2025–26 | Czech First League | 5 | 0 | 1 | 0 | — | | — | | 6 | 0 |
| Career total | | | 39 | 2 | 4 | 0 | 0 | 0 | 0 | 0 | 43 | 2 |

=== International ===
As of match played 29 September 2026

Appearances and goals by national team and year
| National team | Year | Apps | Goals |
|---|---|---|---|
| Liberia | 2021 | 1 | 0 |
| Liberia | 2022 | 6 | 1 |
| Liberia | 2023 | 5 | 1 |
| Liberia | 2024 | 6 | 0 |
| Liberia | 2025 | 6 | 0 |
| Liberia | 2026 | 5 | 0 |
| Total | | 29 | 2 |

Scores and results list Liberia's goal tally first, score column indicates score after each Teah goal.

List of international goals scored by Divine Teah
| No. | Date | Venue | Opponent | Score | Result | Competition |
|---|---|---|---|---|---|---|
| 1 | 29 March 2022 | Mardan Sports Complex, Aksu, Turkey | Burundi | 1–2 | 1–2 | Friendly |
| 2 | 12 September 2023 | Accra Sports Stadium, Accra, Ghana | Ghana | 1–3 | 1–3 | Friendly |

== Honors ==
Slavia Prague

- Czech First League: 2024–25, 2025–26
