= Daniel Fila =

Czech footballer

Personal information
- Date of birth: 21 August 2002 (age 24)
- Place of birth: Brno, Czech Republic
- Height: 1.90 m (6 ft 3 in)
- Position: Forward

Team information
- Current team: Avellino (on loan from Venezia)
- Number: 11

Youth career
- 2009−2010: TJ Sokol Otnice
- 2010−2016: SK Újezd u Brna
- 2016−2017: Zbrojovka Brno
- 2017: Líšeň
- 2017−2021: Zbrojovka Brno

Senior career*
Years	Team	Apps	(Gls)
2020–2021	Zbrojovka Brno	21	(1)
2021–2022	Mladá Boleslav	20	(4)
2022–2025	Slavia Prague	18	(2)
2022–2024	→ Slavia Prague B	3	(2)
2022–2024	→ Teplice (loan)	42	(14)
2025–	Venezia	25	(4)
2026	→ Empoli (loan)	12	(2)
2026–	→ Avellino (loan)	0	(0)

International career^{‡}
2019	Czech Republic U18	2	(0)
2021–2025	Czech Republic U21	24	(11)
- * Club domestic league appearances and goals as of 13 May 2026 ‡ National team caps and goals as of 18 June 2025

Daniel Fila (born 21 August 2002) is a Czech professional footballer who plays as a forward for Serie B club Avellino, on loan from Serie A club Venezia.

== Club career ==
=== Zbrojovka Brno ===
Born in Brno, Fila started his football career at Sokol Otnice, from where he moved to Újezd u Brna before transferring to Zbrojovka Brno in 2016. He had a brief spell with rival Líšeň, but returned to Zbrojovka after five months.

Fila made his professional debut for Zbrojovka Brno in the away match against Jablonec on 5 November 2020, which ended in a win 1–0. He replaced the only scorer of the match Jakub Přichystal in the last minute of injury time. He scored his first goal for Zbrojovka Brno on 14 March 2021, also in a match against Jablonec, in a 2–1 loss.

=== Mladá Boleslav ===
On 9 July 2021, Fila signed a four-year contract with Mladá Boleslav. He made his first appearance for his new club on 25 July 2021, on the first day of the 2021–22 season against FC Viktoria Plzeň, coming on as a substitute for Jiří Skalák in a 3–2 loss. On 31 July 2021, he scored his first goal for Mladá Boleslav in a 3–0 victory over Jablonec.

=== Slavia Prague ===
Fila impressed with Mladá Boleslav, and on 10 February 2022, Fila was transferred to Slavia Prague, signing on a four-and-a-half-year deal.

==== loan to Teplice ====
During September 2022, Fila joined Teplice on a loan deal until end of the season.

=== Venezia ===
On 3 February 2025, Fila signed a contract with Serie A club Venezia until June 2029.

==== Loans to Empoli and Avellino ====
On 30 January 2026, Fila joined Empoli on a loan deal until end of the season.

On 21 July 2026, Fila moved on a new loan to Avellino.

== International career ==
Rowe took part in the 2025 UEFA European Under-21 Championship, scoring a header from a Václav Sejk cross in the Czech Republic's first match of the tournament, a 3–1 loss against England. In the 2–0 win against Slovenia, Fila opened the scoring at the start of the second half, for his second goal of the competition.

== Career statistics ==
As of 11 June 2022

Appearances and goals by club, season and competition
Club	Season	League			Cup		Continental		Other		Total	
Club	Season	Division	Apps	Goals	Apps	Goals	Apps	Goals	Apps	Goals	Apps	Goals
Zbrojovka Brno	2020–21	Czech First League	21	1	1	0	—		—		22	1
Mladá Boleslav	2021–22	Czech First League	20	4	3	1	—		—		23	5
Slavia Prague	2021–22	Czech First League	12	1	—		—		—		12	1
Slavia Prague	2022–23	Czech First League	2	0	—		2	1	—		4	1
Slavia Prague	2024–25	Czech First League	2	1	—		—		—		2	1
Teplice (loan)	2022–23	Czech First League	15	4	1	0	—		—		16	4
Teplice (loan)	2023–24	Czech First League	27	10	2	1	—		—		29	11
Career total			99	21	7	2	2	1	0	0	108	24
