= Aleks Bozhev =

Bulgarian footballer (born 2005)

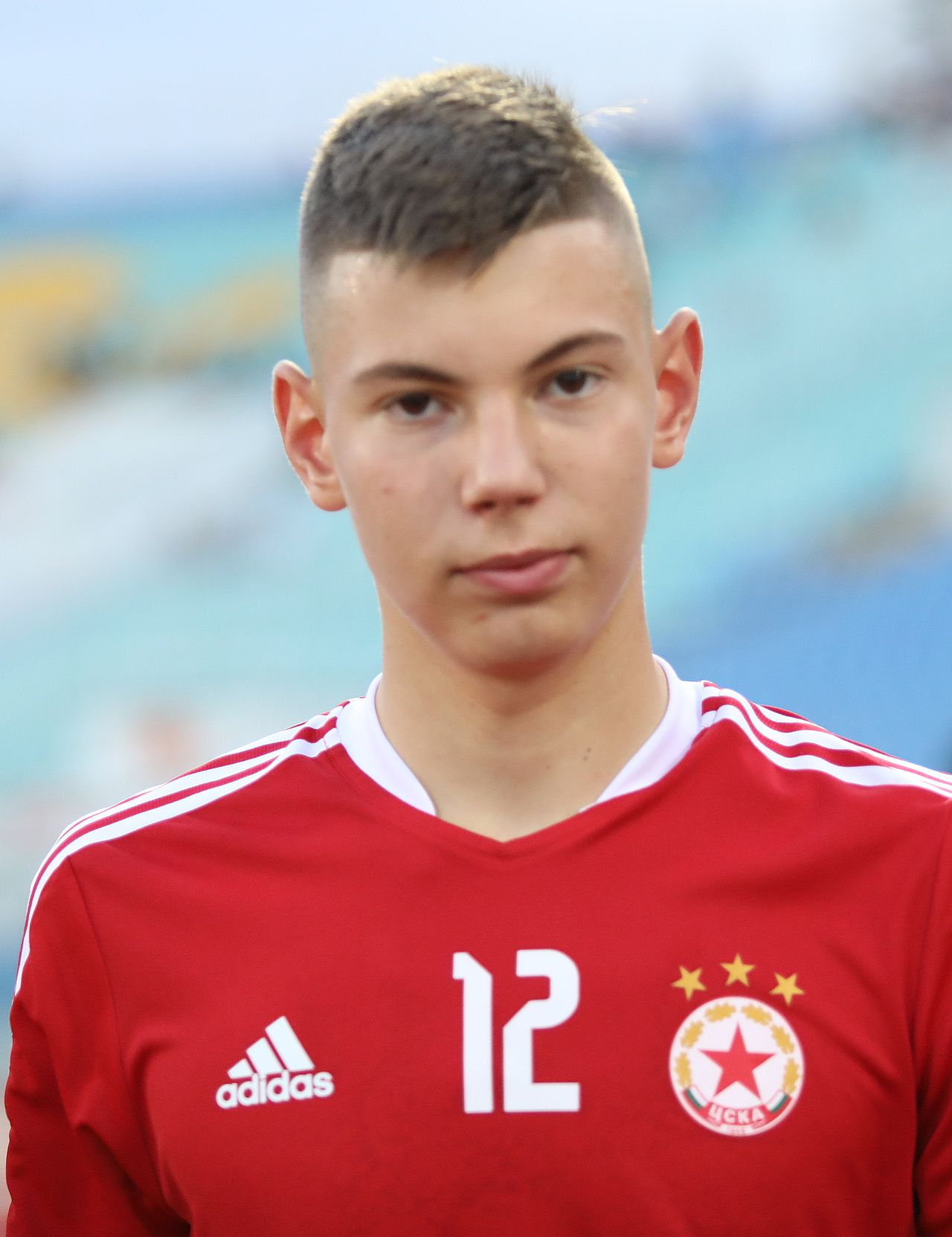

Personal information
- Full name: Aleks Anastasov Bozhev
- Date of birth: 19 July 2005 (age 21)
- Place of birth: Plovdiv, Bulgaria
- Height: 1.89 m (6 ft 2 in)
- Position: Goalkeeper

Team information
- Current team: CSKA 1948
- Number: 31

Youth career
- –2019: Botev Plovdiv
- 2019–2021: CSKA 1948
- 2021–2024: CSKA Sofia

Senior career*
Years	Team	Apps	(Gls)
2020–2024	CSKA Sofia	0	(0)
2022–2023	CSKA Sofia II	23	(0)
2023–2024	→ Litex Lovech (loan)	31	(0)
2024	CSKA 1948 III	5	(0)
2024–2025	CSKA 1948 II	11	(0)
2024–2025	CSKA 1948	8	(0)
2025–	Slavia Prague B	20	(0)
2026–	→ CSKA 1948 (loan)	6	(0)

International career^{‡}
2021–2022	Bulgaria U17	11	(0)
2023	Bulgaria U18	4	(0)
2022–2023	Bulgaria U19	6	(0)
2024–	Bulgaria U21	5	(0)
2025–	Bulgaria	0	(0)
- * Club domestic league appearances and goals as of 10:23, 17 September 2026 (UTC) ‡ National team caps and goals as of 06:22, 24 September 2025 (UTC)

Aleks Anastasov Bozhev (Bulgarian: Алекс Анастасов Божев; born 19 July 2005) is a Bulgarian footballer who plays as a goalkeeper for CSKA 1948.

== Career ==
Bozhev started his career in Botev Plovdiv's youth academy. In 2019 he moved to CSKA 1948, before joining CSKA Sofia. In 2022, he became a regular at CSKA Sofia II and in the summer of 2023 he joined Litex Lovech on a year-long loan. In May 2024, after returning to his parent club, he announced he would leave CSKA. On 13 May 2024 he officially returned to CSKA 1948.

== Career statistics ==
As of 9 December 2024

Appearances and goals by club, season and competition
Club	Season	League			National cup		Europe		Other		Total	
Club	Season	Division	Apps	Goals	Apps	Goals	Apps	Goals	Apps	Goals	Apps	Goals
CSKA Sofia	2020–21	First League	0	0	0	0	0	0	–		0	0
CSKA Sofia	2021–22	First League	0	0	0	0	0	0	0	0	0	0
CSKA Sofia	2022–23	First League	0	0	0	0	0	0	–		0	0
CSKA Sofia	Total		0	0	0	0	0	0	0	0	0	0
CSKA Sofia II	2022–23	Third League	23	0	–		–		–		23	0
Litex Lovech (loan)	2023–24	Second League	31	0	2	0	–		–		33	0
CSKA 1948 III	2024–25	Third League	5	0	–		–		–		5	0
CSKA 1948 II	2024–25	Second League	11	0	–		–		–		11	0
CSKA 1948	2024–25	First League	8	0	1	0	–		–		9	0
Career total			78	0	3	0	0	0	0	0	81	0
