= Vasil Kušej =

Czech footballer

Personal information
- Date of birth: 24 May 2000 (age 26)
- Place of birth: Ústí nad Labem, Czech Republic
- Height: 1.68 m (5 ft 6 in)
- Position: Forward

Team information
- Current team: Slovan Liberec (on loan from Slavia Prague)

Youth career
- –2015: Ústí nad Labem
- 2015–2019: Dynamo Dresden

Senior career*
Years	Team	Apps	(Gls)
2019–2021	Dynamo Dresden	0	(0)
2019–2020	→ Wacker Innsbruck (loan)	4	(0)
2019–2020	→ Wacker Innsbruck II (loan)	4	(2)
2020–2021	→ Ústí nad Labem (loan)	25	(2)
2021–2022	Prostějov	41	(10)
2023–2025	Mladá Boleslav	68	(13)
2025–	Slavia Prague	41	(15)
2026–	→ Slovan Liberec (loan)	0	(0)

International career^{‡}
2015	Czech Republic U16	1	(0)
2016–2017	Czech Republic U17	11	(3)
2018–2019	Czech Republic U18	12	(4)
2018–2019	Czech Republic U19	9	(3)
2022–2023	Czech Republic U21	7	(0)
2023–	Czech Republic	7	(0)
- * Club domestic league appearances and goals as of 24 May 2026 ‡ National team caps and goals as of 17:25, 15 May 2026 (UTC)

Vasil Kušej (born 24 May 2000) is a Czech professional footballer who plays as a forward for Czech First League club Slovan Liberec on loan from Slavia Prague and the Czech Republic national team.

== Club career ==
Born in Ústí nad Labem, Kušej signed for the youth academy of German second division side Dynamo Dresden at the age of 15. In 2019, he was sent on loan to Wacker Innsbruck in the Austrian second division.

In 2020, he was sent on loan to Czech second division club Ústí nad Labem. On 7 November 2024, Kušej scored FK Mladá Boleslav's only goal in a 2–1 defeat by Vitoria in a UEFA Conference League league stage game.

On 7 January 2025, Kušej signed a contract with Slavia Prague until December 2028.

On 27 June 2026, Kušej joined Slovan Liberec on a one-year loan deal with option to make the transfer permanent.

== International career ==
Having represented the Czech Republic at all U16–U21 levels, Kušej debuted for the Czech senior squad on 20 November 2023 in a Euro 2024 qualifying match against Moldova.

== Career statistics ==
=== Club ===
As of 24 May 2026

Appearances and goals by club, season and competition
Club	Season	League			National cup (Note: Includes Austrian Cup, Czech Cup)		Continental		Other		Total	
Club	Season	Division	Apps	Goals	Apps	Goals	Apps	Goals	Apps	Goals	Apps	Goals
Wacker Innsbruck (loan)	2019–20	2. Liga	4	0	1	0	—		—		5	0
Ústí nad Labem (loan)	2020–21	Czech National Football League	25	2	2	0	—		—		27	2
Prostějov	2021–22	Czech National Football League	26	5	3	2	—		—		29	7
Prostějov	2022–23	Czech National Football League	15	5	2	0	—		—		17	5
Prostějov	Total		41	10	5	2	—		—		46	12
Mladá Boleslav	2022–23	Czech First League	16	4	0	0	—		—		16	4
Mladá Boleslav	2023–24	Czech First League	33	6	1	0	—		—		34	6
Mladá Boleslav	2024–25	Czech First League	19	3	0	0	12 (Note: Appearances in UEFA Conference League)	4	—		38	7
Mladá Boleslav	Total		68	13	1	0	12	4	—		137	17
Slavia Prague	2024–25	Czech First League	13	10	2	0	—		—		15	10
Slavia Prague	2025–26	Czech First League	28	5	1	0	7 (Note: Appearances in UEFA Champions League)	1	—		36	6
Slavia Prague	Total		41	15	3	0	7	1	—		51	16
Career total			179	40	12	2	19	5	0	0	210	47

=== International ===
As of match played 12 October 2025

Appearances and goals by national team and year
National team	Year	Apps	Goals
Czech Republic	2023	1	0
Czech Republic	2024	1	0
Czech Republic	2025	5	0
Total		7	0

== Honours ==
Slavia Prague

- Czech First League: 2024–25, 2025–26
