= 2023–24 K Beerschot VA season =

K Beerschot VA
2023–24 season
- Manager: Dirk Kuyt
- Stadium: Olympisch Stadion
- Challenger Pro League: 1st (promoted)
- Belgian Cup: Seventh round
- Top goalscorer: League: Tom Reyners (10); All: Tom Reyners (10)
- Biggest defeat: Beerschot 0–6 Club Brugge

The 2023–24 season was the 124th season in the history of the K Beerschot VA, and the club's second consecutive season in the Challenger Pro League. In addition to the domestic league, the team participated in the Belgian Cup.

== Friendlies ==
=== Pre-season ===
1 July 2023 Friendly	OH Leuven (Belgium)	1–0	(Belgium) Beerschot
12:00

8 July 2023 Friendly	Club Brugge (Belgium)	3–0	(Belgium) Beerschot
13:00

14 July 2023 Friendly	Beerschot (Belgium)	1–0	(Belgium) Kortrijk
19:00

28 July 2023 Friendly	Beerschot (Belgium)	1–0	(Netherlands) FC Den Bosch
15:15

4 August 2023 Friendly	Beerschot (Belgium)	0–0	(Netherlands) Fortuna Sittard
19:00

== Competitions ==
=== Overall record ===
Competition	First match	Last match	Starting round	Final position	Record							
Competition	First match	Last match	Starting round	Final position	Pld	W	D	L	GF	GA	GD	Win %
Challenger Pro League	11 August 2023	19 April 2024	Matchday 1	Winners	30	17	5	8	46	29	+17	56.67
Belgian Cup	9 September 2023	1 November 2023	Sixth round	Seventh round	2	0	1	1	3	9	−6	0.00
Total					32	17	6	9	49	38	+11	53.13

Source: Competitions

=== Challenger Pro League ===
==== League table ====
Pos	Team	Pld	W	D	L	GF	GA	GD	Pts	Qualification
1	Beerschot (C, P)	30	17	5	8	46	29	+17	56	Promoted to Pro League
2	Dender EH (P)	30	15	9	6	55	32	+23	54	Promoted to Pro League
3	Deinze	30	16	5	9	48	37	+11	53	Qualification for promotion play-offs
4	Lommel (O)	30	15	7	8	51	31	+20	52	Qualification for promotion play-offs
5	Zulte Waregem	30	15	6	9	51	34	+17	51	Qualification for promotion play-offs

Source: Challenger Pro League
Rules for classification: 1) Points; 2) Matches won; 3) Goal difference; 4) Goals scored; 5) Away goals scored; 6) Away matches won; 7) Play-off.
(C) Champions; (O) Play-off winners; (P) Promoted

==== Results summary ====
Overall								Home						Away					
Pld	W	D	L	GF	GA	GD	Pts	W	D	L	GF	GA	GD	W	D	L	GF	GA	GD
30	17	5	8	46	29	+17	56	7	4	4	19	11	+8	10	1	4	27	18	+9

Source: Worldfootball

==== Results by round ====
Round	1	2	3	4	5	6	7	8	9	10	11	12	13	14	15	16	17	18	19	20	21	22	23	24
Ground	A	H	A	H	H	A	H	A	H	H	A	A	H	A	H	A	H	A	H	A	H	A	H	A
Result	W	L	L	W	D	W	D	W	W	L	W	W	W	W	L	W	D	L	W	W	W	L	D	D
Position	2	4	11	6	7	4	6	5	3	3	2	2	1	1	2	2	1	3						

Source: Worldfootball
A = Away; H = Home; W = Win; D = Draw; L = Loss

==== Matches ====
The match schedule was released on 22 June 2023.

11 August 2023 1	RSCA Futures	1–3	Beerschot

19 August 2023 2	Beerschot	1–2	SV Zulte Waregem

2 September 2023 4	Beerschot	2–1	Francs Borains

16 September 2023 5	Beerschot	0–0	SK Beveren

24 September 2023 6	Lierse Kempenzonen	1–3	Beerschot

30 September 2023 7	Beerschot	1–1	KV Oostende

7 October 2023 8	KRC Genk II	1–2	Beerschot

20 October 2023 9	Beerschot	2–1	Lommel

29 October 2023 10	Beerschot	0–1	FCV Dender EH

5 November 2023 11	Club NXT	0–2	Beerschot

11 November 2023 12	RFC Seraing	1–2	Beerschot

26 November 2023 13	Beerschot	3–0	RFC Liège

1 December 2023 14	Patro Eisden	0–2	Beerschot

5 December 2023 3	SL16 FC	1–0	Beerschot

10 December 2023 15	Beerschot	1–2	Deinze

17 December 2023 16	Francs Borains	1–3	Beerschot

12 January 2024 17	Beerschot	1–1	RSCA Futures

28 January 2024 19	Beerschot	3–0	Club NXT

4 February 2024 20	RFC Liège	1–4	Beerschot

7 February 2024 18	Lommel	3–0	Beerschot

11 February 2024 21	Beerschot	2–0	SL16 FC

18 February 2024 22	Deinze	4–2	Beerschot

25 February 2024 23	Beerschot	0–0	RFC Seraing

3 March 2024 24	Dender	1–1	Beerschot
