= Oscar Dorley =

Liberian footballer (born 1998)

Personal information
- Full name: Oscar Murphy Dorley
- Birth name: Murphy Dorley
- Date of birth: 19 July 1998 (age 28)
- Place of birth: Monrovia, Liberia
- Height: 1.74 m (5 ft 9 in)
- Position: Defensive midfielder

Team information
- Current team: Al Taawoun
- Number: 19

Senior career*
Years	Team	Apps	(Gls)
2013–2016	Monrovia Club Breweries		
2016–2019	Trakai	43	(11)
2018	→ Slovan Liberec (loan)	23	(1)
2019	Slovan Liberec	18	(1)
2019–2026	Slavia Prague	162	(9)
2019	→ Slovan Liberec (loan)	11	(1)
2026–	Al Taawoun	6	(0)

International career^{‡}
2015–	Liberia	54	(4)
- * Club domestic league appearances and goals as of 12 September 2026 ‡ National team caps and goals as of 6 June 2026

Oscar Murphy Dorley (born 19 July 1998) is a Liberian professional footballer who plays as a defensive midfielder for Saudi Pro League club Al Taawoun and the Liberia national team.

== Life ==
Dorley was born in Monrovia. He was born Murphy Dorley, but one of his coaches started calling him Oscar because his physique and playing style reminded him of Brazilian footballer Oscar. The name Oscar then became known throughout his native country and became part of his name.

== Club career ==
Dorley spent his early career with Monrovia Club Breweries and Trakai. In February 2018, he joined Czech team Slovan Liberec on loan for the remainder of the 2017–18 season. In January 2019, he made the deal permanent, signing a three-and-a-half-year contract.

On 11 August 2019, Dorley signed for Slavia Prague on a four-year contract from Slovan Liberec, with the midfielder staying on loan at Slovan Liberec until the end of 2019.

On 21 August 2026, Dorley signed a two-year contract with Saudi Pro League club Al Taawoun with an option for another year.

== International career ==
Dorley made his international debut for Liberia on 5 July 2015 in a 1–1 Africa Cup of Nations qualifying draw against Guinea.

== Career statistics ==
=== Club ===
As of match played 12 September 2026

Appearances and goals by club, season and competition
Club	Season	League			National cup (Note: Includes Czech Cup)		Continental		Other		Total	
Club	Season	Division	Apps	Goals	Apps	Goals	Apps	Goals	Apps	Goals	Apps	Goals
Trakai	2016	A Lyga	13	3	0	0	0	0	—		13	3
Trakai	2017	A Lyga	30	8	0	0	6 (Note: Appearance(s) in UEFA Europa League)	0	1 (Note: Appearance(s) in Lithuanian Supercup)	0	37	8
Trakai	Total		43	11	0	0	6	0	1	0	50	11
Slovan Liberec (loan)	2017–18	Czech First League	12	1	1	0	—		—		13	1
Slovan Liberec (loan)	2018–19	Czech First League	11	0	2	0	—		—		13	0
Slovan Liberec (loan)	Total		23	1	3	0	—		—		26	1
Slovan Liberec	2018–19	Czech First League	10	1	2	0	—		—		13	1
Slavia Prague	2019–20	Czech First League	6	0	0	0	0	0	0	0	6	0
Slavia Prague	2020–21	Czech First League	26	2	5	0	10	0	—		41	2
Slavia Prague	2021–22	Czech First League	23	1	2	0	13 (Note: Two appearances in UEFA Champions League, one appearance in UEFA Europa League, ten appearances in UEFA Conference League)	1	—		38	2
Slavia Prague	2022–23	Czech First League	25	0	4	0	10 (Note: Appearance(s) in UEFA Conference League)	0	—		39	0
Slavia Prague	2023–24	Czech First League	31	1	2	0	11	0	—		44	1
Slavia Prague	2024–25	Czech First League	29	4	1	0	12 (Note: Four appearances and one goal in UEFA Champions League, eight appearances in UEFA Europa League)	1	—		42	5
Slavia Prague	2025–26	Czech First League	22	1	1	0	5 (Note: Appearance(s) in UEFA Champions League)	0	—		28	1
Slavia Prague	Total		161	9	15	0	62	1	0	0	247	11
Slovan Liberec (loan)	2019–20	Czech First League	15	1	2	1	—		—		17	2
Al Taawoun	2026–27	Saudi Pro League	6	0	0	0	1 (Note: Appearance in AFC Champions League Two)	0	—		7	0
Career total			270	23	23	1	68	2	1	0	364	26

=== International ===
As of match played 29 September 2026

Appearances and goals by national team and year
National team	Year	Apps	Goals
Liberia	2015	4	0
Liberia	2016	2	0
Liberia	2017	1	0
Liberia	2018	5	0
Liberia	2019	6	0
Liberia	2021	8	1
Liberia	2022	3	0
Liberia	2023	7	1
Liberia	2024	9	1
Liberia	2025	6	0
Liberia	2026	5	1
Total		56	4

Scores and results list Liberia's goal tally first, score column indicates score after each Dorley goal.

List of international goals scored by Oscar Dorley
No.	Date	Venue	Opponent	Score	Result	Competition
1	14 June 2021	Chedly Zouiten Stadium, Tunis, Tunisia	Tunisia	1–0	1–0	Friendly
2	14 October 2023	Antoinette Tubman Stadium, Monrovia, Liberia	Libya	2–2	2–3	Friendly
3	20 March 2024	Marrakesh Stadium, Marrakesh, Morocco	Djibouti	2–0	2–0	2025 Africa Cup of Nations qualification
4	31 March 2026	Stade Larbi Zaouli, Casablanca, Morocco	Libya	1–2	2–2	Friendly

== Honors ==
Slavia Prague

- Czech First League: 2019–20, 2020–21, 2024–25, 2025–26
- Czech Cup: 2020–21, 2022–23
