= Michal Kohút =

Czech footballer

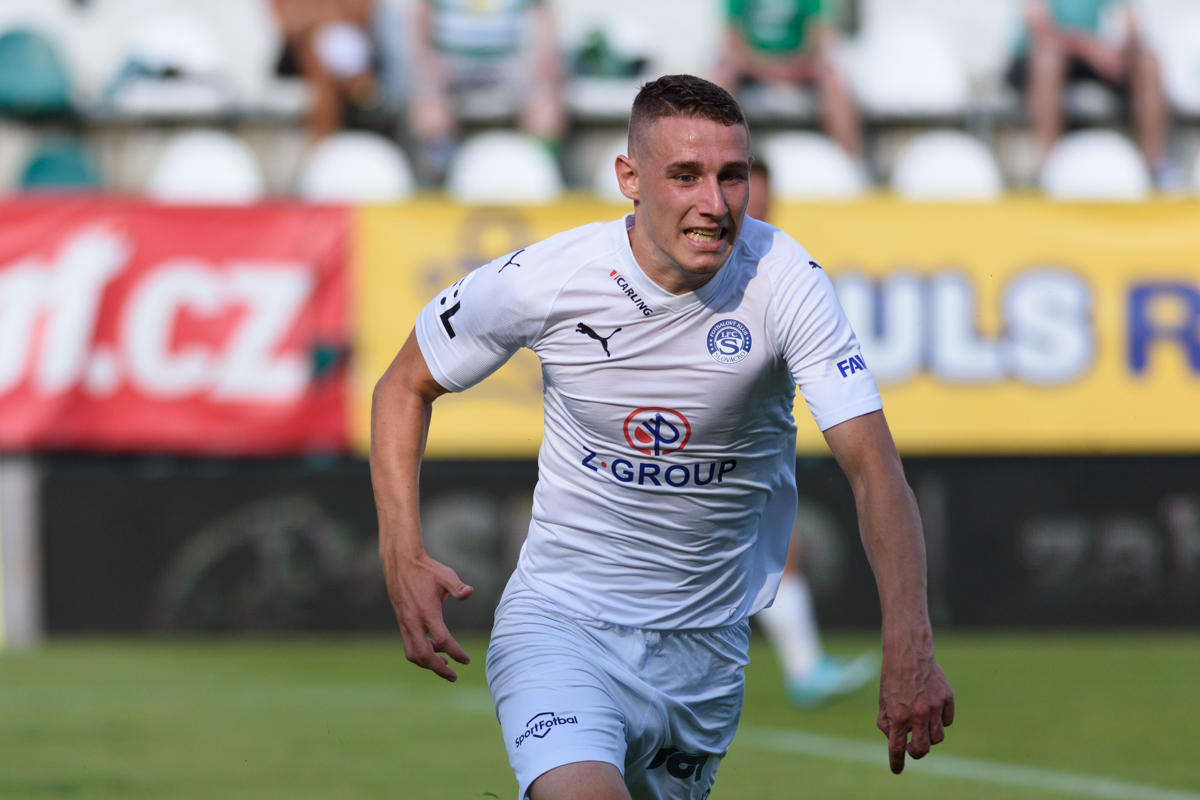

Personal information
- Date of birth: 4 June 2000 (age 26)
- Position: Midfielder

Team information
- Current team: Baník Ostrava
- Number: 21

Youth career
- Slovácko

Senior career*
Years	Team	Apps	(Gls)
2019–2025	Slovácko	115	(7)
2019	→ Pardubice (loan)	15	(5)
2025–	Baník Ostrava	26	(3)

International career^{‡}
2017	Czech Republic U17	5	(1)
2017–2018	Czech Republic U18	9	(0)
2019	Czech Republic U20	4	(0)
2019–	Czech Republic U21	1	(0)
- * Club domestic league appearances and goals as of 25 May 2026 ‡ National team caps and goals as of 14 November 2019

Michal Kohút (born 4 June 2000) is a Czech professional footballer who plays for Baník Ostrava.

== Club career ==
He made his professional Czech National Football League debut for Pardubice on 26 July 2019 in a game against Zbrojovka Brno.

He made his Czech First League debut for Slovácko on 8 March 2020 in a game against Teplice.

On 16 January 2025, Kohút signed a multi-year contract with Baník Ostrava.
