= SK Slavia Prague B =

Slavia Prague B
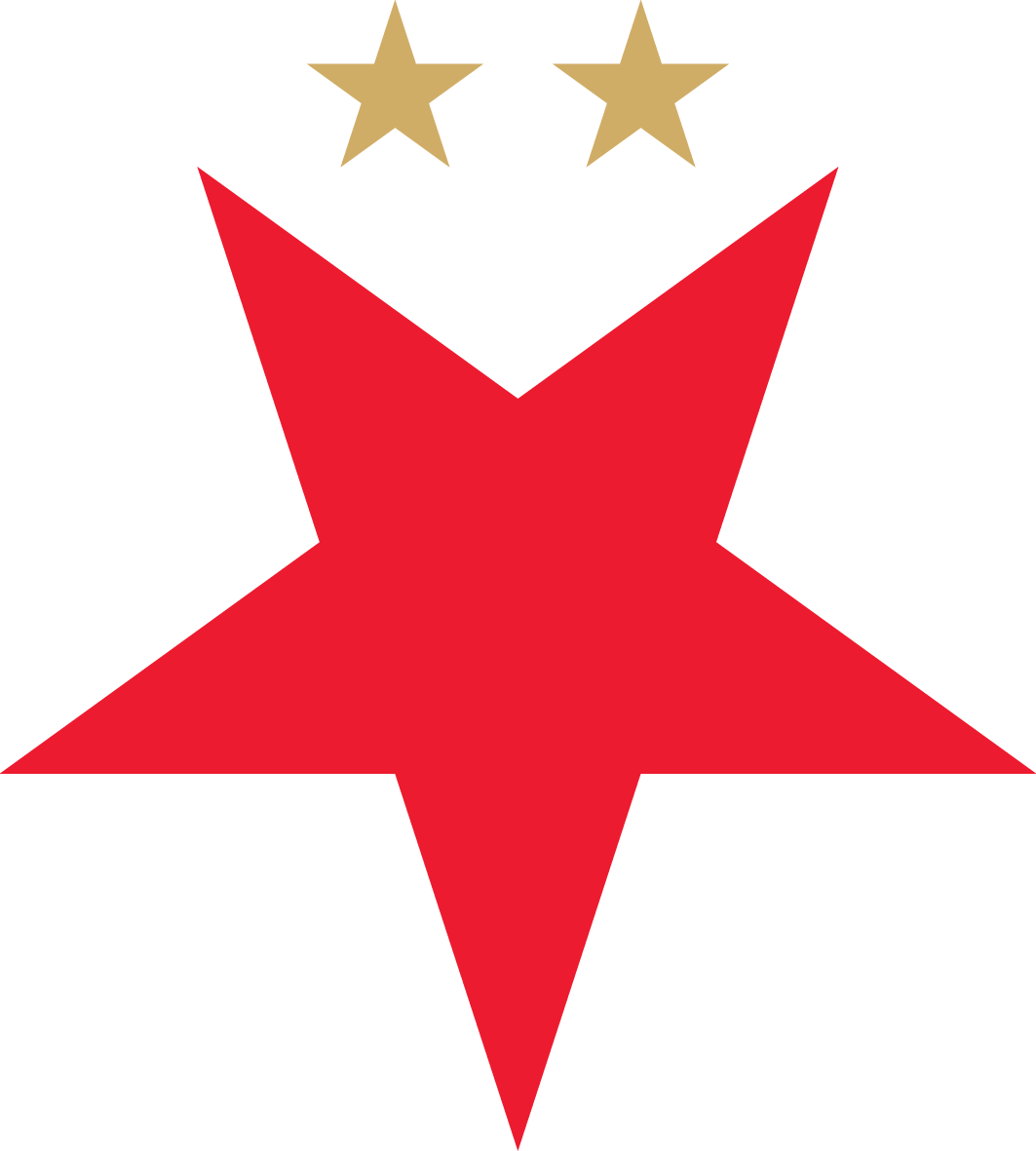
- Full name: Sportovní klub Slavia Praha B
- Founded: 1896
- Ground: FK Viktoria Stadion, Prague
- Manager: Tomáš Heidenreich
- League: Czech National Football League
- 2025–26: 10th of 16
Home colours	Away colours

Sportovní klub Slavia Praha B, commonly known as Slavia Prague B, is the reserve team of Czech First League club SK Slavia Prague. The team currently play in the Czech National Football League.

== History ==
Formed shortly after Slavia Prague's footballing department, Slavia Prague B entered the Mistrovství Čech a Moravy in the springtime of 1897, finishing second behind the first team. Slavia's B team competed in the tournament until 1909. In 1949, the team entered the Oblastní soutěž, the second tier of Czechoslovak football, winning the title in 1958. During the 1960s, Slavia Prague B competed in the Second League, the Prague Championship and Divize B and Divize C, competing in the latter two competitions during the 1970s, before withdrawing from football from 1977 to 1984. During the 1980s, the team bounced between the third and the fourth tiers of Czech football, before the formation of the Bohemian Football League.

Following the dissolution of Czechoslovakia in 1993, Slavia Prague B remained in the Bohemian Football League, winning the competition in 1997. In 2011, Slavia Prague B finished 17th in the Bohemian Football League, being relegated into Divize A. From 2012 to 2019, the team competed in youth football, before returning to the Bohemian Football League in 2019. In 2022, Slavia Prague B were promoted in the Czech National Football League, the second tier of Czech football, after winning the Bohemian Football League. In 2023, Slavia Prague B finished 15th in the 2022–23 Czech National Football League, being relegated back into Bohemian Football League.

== Stadium ==
Since 2013, Slavia Prague B, alongside the club's youth teams from under-16 to under-19 level, has played at Na Chvalech in the Horní Počernice area of Prague, groundsharing with SC Xaverov.

== Current squad ==
As of 27 August 2026

Note: Flags indicate national team as defined under FIFA eligibility rules; some limited exceptions apply. Players may hold more than one non-FIFA nationality.

No.	Pos.	Nation	Player
1	GK	UKR	Oleksandr Petrenko
2	DF	CZE	Jáchym Palivec
3	DF	BFA	Ruben Compaoré
5	DF	CZE	Martin Kovář
6	DF	COL	Miguel Solarte (on loan from Boca Juniors de Cali)
7	MF	MNE	Lazar Savović
8	FW	NGA	Victor Uduebo
9	FW	CZE	Tomáš Necid
10	MF	POL	Bartosz Szywała
11	MF	CZE	David Mikulanda
12	DF	CZE	Pavel Behenský
13	FW	CZE	Petr Potměšil
14	MF	CZE	Karel Belžík
15	FW	CZE	Dan Kohout

No.	Pos.	Nation	Player
17	DF	CZE	Marek Suchý
18	MF	NGA	Izuchukwu Okonkwo
19	FW	NOR	Abel Cedergren
20	MF	CZE	Adam Rajnoha
21	MF	LBR	Divine Teah
22	DF	CZE	Martin Palaščák
23	DF	CZE	Štěpán Chaluš
24	MF	CZE	Jakub Kolísek
26	MF	CZE	Ondřej Frolík
27	DF	CZE	František Herák
28	DF	CZE	Matyáš Mervard
29	GK	CZE	Adam Rezek
40	GK	CZE	Adam Paar
—	FW	EGY	Ibrahim El Nagaawy
