= 2023–24 FK Pardubice season =

FK Pardubice
2023–24 season
- Manager: Radoslav Kováč
- Stadium: CFIG Arena
- Czech First League: Ongoing
- Czech Cup: Third round
- Top goalscorer: League: Kryštof Daněk; Tomáš Zlatohlávek (4 each); All: Kryštof Daněk; Tomáš Zlatohlávek (4 each)
- Average home league attendance: 3,442
- All statistics correct as of August 2023.

The 2023–24 season is FK Pardubice's 16th season in existence and fourth consecutive in the Czech First League. They will also compete in the Czech Cup.

== Players ==
=== First-team squad ===
As of 15 September 2023.

Note: Flags indicate national team as defined under FIFA eligibility rules; some limited exceptions apply. Players may hold more than one non-FIFA nationality.

No.	Pos.	Nation	Player
1	GK	CZE	Antonín Kinský (on loan from Slavia Prague)
2	DF	CZE	Matyáš Hanč
4	DF	CZE	Denis Halinský (on loan from Slavia Prague)
5	DF	CZE	Denis Donát (on loan from Mladá Boleslav)
6	DF	CZE	Marek Icha (on loan from Slavia Prague)
7	MF	CZE	Kamil Vacek
8	FW	CZE	Vojtěch Patrák
9	FW	CZE	Pavel Černý
10	MF	POL	Bartosz Pikul
11	MF	CZE	Kryštof Daněk (on loan from Sparta Prague)
12	MF	CZE	Emil Tischler
13	DF	CZE	Tomáš Koukola
15	MF	CZE	Denis Darmovzal
16	MF	CZE	Dominik Mareš
17	FW	CZE	Ladislav Krobot

No.	Pos.	Nation	Player
18	MF	CZE	Štěpán Míšek
19	MF	CZE	Michal Hlavatý
20	DF	CZE	Matěj Helešic
23	DF	CZE	Michal Surzyn
24	MF	CZE	Tomáš Solil
25	DF	CZE	Ondřej Sedláček
26	DF	COL	Pablo Ortíz (on loan from FC Midtjylland)
27	MF	CZE	Vojtěch Sychra
30	MF	CZE	Jakub Matoušek (on loan from Sigma Olomouc)
31	FW	CMR	William Mukwelle
33	FW	CZE	Tomáš Zlatohlávek
35	DF	CZE	Ondřej Kukučka (on loan from Sparta Prague)
87	GK	CZE	Nicolas Šmíd
93	GK	SVK	Viktor Budinský
—	DF	CZE	Petr Kurka

=== Out on loan ===
Note: Flags indicate national team as defined under FIFA eligibility rules; some limited exceptions apply. Players may hold more than one non-FIFA nationality.

No.	Pos.	Nation	Player
—	DF	BRA	Bernardo Rosa (at Viktoria Žižkov)
—	FW	BRA	Leandro Lima (at Samgurali Tsqaltubo)

No.	Pos.	Nation	Player
—	MF	CZE	Samuel Šimek (at Prostějov)
—	FW	CZE	David Huf (at Chrudim)

== Transfers ==
=== In ===
Pos.	Player	Transferred from	Fee	Date	Source

=== Out ===
Pos.	Player	Transferred to	Fee	Date	Source

== Pre-season and friendlies ==
Win Draw Loss Fixtures

11 July 2023 Friendly	Pardubice (Czech Republic)	2–0	(Czech Republic) MFK Chrudim
11:00

15 July 2023 Friendly	Pardubice (Czech Republic)	0–2	(Czech Republic) FC Košice
18:00

== Competitions ==
=== Overall record ===
Competition	First match	Last match	Starting round	Final position	Record							
Competition	First match	Last match	Starting round	Final position	Pld	W	D	L	GF	GA	GD	Win %
Czech First League	22 July 2023	27 April 2024	Matchday 1		18	4	4	10	15	25	−10	22.22
Czech Cup	30 August 2023	27 September 2023	Second round	Third round	2	1	1	0	4	1	+3	50.00
Total					20	5	5	10	19	26	−7	25.00

Last updated: 16 December 2023
Source: Soccerway

=== Czech First League ===
==== Results summary ====
Overall								Home						Away					
Pld	W	D	L	GF	GA	GD	Pts	W	D	L	GF	GA	GD	W	D	L	GF	GA	GD
35	11	7	17	39	47	−8	40	5	5	8	21	19	+2	6	2	9	18	28	−10

Source: Fortuna Liga

==== Regular season ====
===== Table =====
Pos	Team	Pld	W	D	L	GF	GA	GD	Pts	Qualification or relegation
11	Bohemians 1905	30	8	11	11	29	40	−11	35	Qualification for the Relegation group
12	Jablonec	30	6	12	12	35	45	−10	30	Qualification for the Relegation group
13	Pardubice	30	7	7	16	29	42	−13	28	Qualification for the Relegation group
14	Karviná	30	6	7	17	30	52	−22	25	Qualification for the Relegation group
15	Zlín	30	5	10	15	36	61	−25	25	Qualification for the Relegation group

Source: Fortuna Liga
Rules for classification: 1) Points; 2) Head-to-head points; 3) Head-to-head goal difference; 4) Head-to-head goals scored; 5) Goal difference; 6) Goals scored; 7) Fair-play ranking; 8) Draw.

===== Results by round =====
Round	1	2	3	4	5	6	7	8	9	10	11	12	13	14	15	16	17	18	19	20	21	22	23	24	25	26	27	28	29	30
Ground	H	H	A	H	A	H	A	H	A	H	A	H	A	H	A	A	H	A	H	A	H	A	H	A	H	A	H	A	H	A
Result	L	D	L	W	L	L	W	L	L	D	D	D	W	L	L	L	L	W	W	W	D	L	L	L	L	W	D	D	L	L
Position	9	11	13	12	13	13	12	12	12	13	13	13	13	13	14	14	14	13	13	11	12	13	13	13	13	13	13	13	13	13

Source: Fortuna Liga
A = Away; H = Home; W = Win; D = Draw; L = Loss

===== Matches =====
The league fixtures were unveiled on 21 June 2023.

22 July 2023 1	Pardubice	0–1	Bohemians 1905	Pardubice
15:00 CEST (UTC+2)		Report	Hůlka 5'	Stadium: CFIG Arena; Attendance: 3,817; Referee: Tomáš Batík

29 July 2023 2	Pardubice	0–0	Jablonec	Pardubice
15:00 CEST (UTC+2)	Kinský (red card) 24'; Hlavatý (yellow card) 42'	Report	F. Souček (yellow card) 45+4'; Chanturishvili (yellow card) 50'; Polidar (yellow card) 54'	Stadium: CFIG Arena; Attendance: 3,012; Referee: Jan Všetečka

5 August 2023 3	Sparta Prague	5–2	Pardubice	Prague
15:00 CEST (UTC+2)	Kuchta 15', 24'; Haraslín 22'; Zelený (yellow card) 34'; Wiesner 47'; Birmančević 56'	Report	Kováč (coach) (yellow card) 45+4'; Surzyn (yellow card) 45+4'; Darmovzal 65'; Krobot 73'; Mikula (assistant coach) (yellow card) (after game)	Stadium: epet ARENA; Attendance: 16,911; Referee: Tomáš Klíma

13 August 2023 4	Pardubice	2–1	Karviná	Pardubice
15:00 CEST (UTC+2)	Tischler 39'; Matoušek 55'	Report	Halinský 90+4' (o.g.)	Stadium: CFIG Arena; Attendance: 2,887; Referee: Ondřej Berka

19 August 2023 5	Slovan Liberec	1–0	Pardubice	Liberec
15:00 CEST (UTC+2)	Frýdek 13'; Prebsl (yellow card) 90+1'	Report	Hlavatý (yellow card) 90+5'	Stadium: Stadion u Nisy; Attendance: 1,858; Referee: Dalibor Černý

26 August 2023 6	Pardubice	0–1	Slovácko	Pardubice
15:00 CEST (UTC+2)		Report	Kalabiška 21'	Stadium: CFIG Arena; Attendance: 3,014; Referee: Ladislav Szikszay

2 September 2023 7	Teplice	0–1	Pardubice	Teplice
15:00 CEST (UTC+2)		Report	Krobot 82'	Stadium: Na Stínadlech; Attendance: 3,481; Referee: Michael Kvítek

16 September 2023 8	Pardubice	0–1	Slavia Prague	Pardubice
18:00 CEST (UTC+2)		Report	Jurečka 28' (pen.)	Stadium: CFIG Arena; Attendance: 4,620; Referee: Ondřej Pechanec

24 September 2023 9	Viktoria Plzeň	6–2	Pardubice	Plzeň
15:00 CEST (UTC+2)	Kalvach 23'; Dweh 27'; Hranáč 45'; Jirka 53' (pen.); Durosinmi 82', 85'	Report	Darmovzal 13'; Daněk 90+1'	Stadium: Doosan Arena; Attendance: 8,809; Referee: Stanislav Volek

1 October 2023 10	Pardubice	1–1	Hradec Králové	Pardubice
18:00 CEST (UTC+2)	Černý 44' (pen.)	Report	Harazim 61'	Stadium: CFIG Arena; Attendance: 4,530; Referee: Ondřej Berka

7 October 2023 11	Baník Ostrava	1–1	Pardubice	Ostrava
18:00 CEST (UTC+2)	Ewerton 50'	Report	Daněk 42' (pen.)	Stadium: Městský stadion Attendance: 9,108; Referee: Jan Petřík

21 October 2023 12	Pardubice	1–1	Sigma Olomouc	Pardubice
15:00 CEST (UTC+2)	Daněk 22' (pen.)	Report	Halinský 90+4' (o.g.)	Stadium: CFIG Arena; Attendance: 3,141; Referee: Karel Rouček

28 October 2023 13	České Budějovice	0–1	Pardubice	České Budějovice
15:00 CEST (UTC+2)		Report	Zlatohlávek 9'	Stadium: Stadion Střelecký ostrov Attendance: 2,238; Referee: Jan Petřík

4 November 2023 14	Pardubice	0–1	Zlín	Pardubice
15:00 CET (UTC+1)		Report	Bužek 45+2'	Stadium: CFIG Arena; Attendance: 2,816; Referee: Daniel Vokoun

11 November 2023 15	Mladá Boleslav	1–0	Pardubice	Mladá Boleslav
15:00 CET (UTC+1)	Kušej 47'	Report		Stadium: Lokotrans Aréna; Attendance: 1,510; Referee: Petr Hocek

26 November 2023 16	Jablonec	2–1	Pardubice	Jablonec nad Nisou
15:00 CET (UTC+1)	Kratochvíl 37', 75'; Hurtado (yellow card) 50'; Látal (coach) (yellow card) 50'	Report	Zlatohlávek 12'; Patrák (yellow card) 35'; Ortíz (yellow card) 74'; Daněk (yellow card) 84'; Solil (yellow card) 87'	Stadium: Stadion Střelnice; Attendance: 1,411; Referee: Stanislav Volek

3 December 2023 17	Pardubice	1–2	Sparta Prague	Pardubice
15:00 CET (UTC+1)	Zlatohlávek 26'; Vacek (yellow card) 79'; Ortíz (yellow card) 90+7'; Mikula (assistant coach) (yellow card) 90+9'	Report	Krejčí 19', 65'; Kuchta (yellow card) 79'; Kairinen (yellow card) 90+9'	Stadium: CFIG Arena; Attendance: 4,620; Referee: Dalibor Černý

16 December 2023 19	Pardubice	2–0	Slovan Liberec	Pardubice
15:00 CET (UTC+1)	Zlatohlávek 12'; Patrák (yellow card) 37'; Daněk 67', (yellow card) 88'; Kinský (yellow card) 90'; Mukwelle (red card) 90'	Report	Žambůrek (yellow card) 34'; Červ (yellow card) 63'; Mikula (yellow card) 75'; Rabušic (yellow card) 90+3'	Stadium: CFIG Arena; Attendance: 2,189; Referee: Marek Radina

10 February 2024 20	Slovácko	1–2	Pardubice	Uherské Hradiště
15:00 CET (UTC+1)	Cicilia 89'	Report	Zlatohlávek 14'; Hlavatý 90+1'	Stadium: Městský fotbalový stadion Miroslava Valenty; Attendance: 4,720; Referee: Stanislav Volek

14 February 2024 18	Karviná	0–3	Pardubice	Karviná
17:00 CET (UTC+1)		Report	Daněk 24'; Icha 75'; Krobot 77'	Stadium: Městský stadion Attendance: 1,510; Referee: Ondřej Berka

17 February 2024 21	Pardubice	1–1	Teplice	Pardubice
15:00 CET (UTC+1)	Zlatohlávek 1'	Report	Chaloupek 87'	Stadium: CFIG Arena; Attendance: 3,028; Referee: Michael Kvítek

25 February 2024 22	Slavia Prague	3–0	Pardubice	Prague
15:00 CET (UTC+1)	Chytil 66', 72', 74'	Report		Stadium: Fortuna Arena; Attendance: 17,562; Referee: Marek Radina

2 March 2024 23	Pardubice	2–3	Viktoria Plzeň	Pardubice
18:00 CET (UTC+1)	Daněk 55'; Kalvach 72' (o.g.)	Report	Kalvach 43'; Šulc 47', 49'	Stadium: CFIG Arena; Attendance: 3,849; Referee: Jan Machálek

9 March 2024 24	Hradec Králové	2–0	Pardubice	Hradec Králové
15:00 CET (UTC+1)	Čihák 57'; Vašulín 73'	Report		Stadium: Malšovická aréna Attendance: 8.519; Referee: Karel Rouček

17 March 2024 25	Pardubice	0–1	Baník Ostrava	Pardubice
15:00 CET (UTC+1)		Report	Blažek 69'	Stadium: CFIG Arena; Attendance: 4,107; Referee: Ladislav Szikszay

30 March 2024 26	Sigma Olomouc	0–2	Pardubice	Olomouc
15:00 CET (UTC+1)		Report	Macík 32' (o.g.); Zlatohlávek 90+1'	Stadium: Andrův stadion Attendance: 3,366; Referee: Ondřej Berka

7 April 2024 27	Pardubice	1–1	České Budějovice	Pardubice
15:00 CEST (UTC+2)	Surzyn 5'	Report	Ondrášek 80'	Stadium: CFIG Arena; Attendance: 3,131; Referee: Marek Radina

14 April 2024 28	Zlín	1–1	Pardubice	Zlín
15:00 CEST (UTC+2)	Vukadinović 18'	Report	Hlavatý 48' (pen.)	Stadium: Letná Stadion; Attendance: 3,143; Referee: Dalibor Černý

21 April 2024 29	Pardubice	1–2	Mladá Boleslav	Pardubice
15:00 CEST (UTC+2)	Icha 54'	Report	Ladra 7'; Jawo 37', (yellow card) 53'	Stadium: CFIG Arena; Attendance: 2,885; Referee: Jan Machálek

28 April 2024 30	Bohemians 1905	2–1	Pardubice	Prague
15:00 CEST (UTC+2)	Kovařík 26'; Matoušek 73'	Report	Sychra 48'	Stadium: Ďolíček; Attendance: 5,905; Referee: Petr Hocek

==== Relegation group ====
Pos	Team	Pld	W	D	L	GF	GA	GD	Pts	Qualification or relegation	JAB	PCE	BOH	KAR	CBU	ZLN
11	Jablonec	35	9	14	12	45	50	−5	41		—	3–0	—	3–2	—	1–0
12	Pardubice	35	11	7	17	39	47	−8	40		—	—	—	4–0	3–2	2–0
13	Bohemians 1905	35	9	12	14	34	48	−14	39		1–1	0–1	—	1–3	—	—
14	Karviná (O)	35	8	8	19	38	62	−24	32	Qualification for the relegation play-offs	—	—	—	—	1–0	2–2
15	České Budějovice (O)	35	7	8	20	41	70	−29	29	Qualification for the relegation play-offs	2–2	—	2–1	—	—	—
16	Zlín (R)	35	5	12	18	40	69	−29	27	Relegation to FNL	—	—	1–2	—	1–1	—

Source: Fortuna Liga
Legend: Blue = home team win; Yellow = draw; Red = away team win.
Rules for classification: 1) Total points; 2) Points earned in regular season; 3) Head-to-head points (regular season); 4) Head-to-head goal difference (regular season); 5) Head-to-head goals scored (regular season); 5) Goal difference (all matches); 6) Goals scored (all matches); 7) Fair-play ranking; 8) Draw.
(O) Play-off winners; (R) Relegated

===== Results by round =====
Round	1	2	3	4	5
Ground	H	H	A	H	A
Result	W	W	L	W	W
Position	13	13	13	13	12

Source: Fortuna Liga
A = Away; H = Home; W = Win; D = Draw; L = Loss

===== Matches =====
4 May 2024 31	Pardubice	2–0	Zlín	Pardubice
15:00 CEST (UTC+2)	Icha 47'; Krobot 85'	Report		Stadium: CFIG Arena; Attendance: 2,608; Referee: Dalibor Černý

12 May 2024 32	Pardubice	3–2	České Budějovice	Pardubice
15:00 CEST (UTC+2)	Hlavatý 45+1', 85'; Poulolo 69' (o.g.)	Report	Alli 31'; Čermák 73'	Stadium: CFIG Arena; Attendance: 2,853; Referee: Karel Rouček

16 May 2024 33	Jablonec	3–0	Pardubice	Jablonec nad Nisou
17:00 CEST (UTC+2)	Polidar 64'; Kratochvíl 78'; Náprstek 87'	Report		Stadium: Stadion Střelnice; Attendance: 1,897; Referee: Jan Všetečka

19 May 2024 34	Pardubice	4–0	Karviná	Pardubice
17:00 CEST (UTC+2)	Krobot 33', 51', 54'; Zlatohlávek (yellow card) 40'; Vacek (yellow card) 42'; Daněk 43'; Patrák (yellow card) 70'	Report	Čavoš (yellow card) 29'; Boháč (yellow card) 67'; Ezeh (yellow card) 75'	Stadium: CFIG Arena; Attendance: 3,112; Referee: Ondřej Berka

25 May 2024 35	Bohemians 1905	0–1	Pardubice	Prague
18:00 CEST (UTC+2)		Report	Daněk 64'	Stadium: Ďolíček; Attendance: 3,012; Referee: Vojtěch Opočenský
