= 2022–23 FK Pardubice season =

FK Pardubice
2022–23 season
- Chairman: Vladimír Pitter
- Manager: Radoslav Kováč
- Stadium: Ďolíček (Note: Pardubice played the first half of the season in Ďolíček due to the rebuilding of their stadium Pod Vinicí.) (Temporary stadium); CFIG Arena (Home stadium)
- Czech First League: 14th
- Czech Cup: Second round

The 2022–23 season is the 121st in the history of FK Pardubice and their 19th consecutive season in the top flight. The club will participate in the Czech First League and the Czech Cup.

== Players ==
As of 3 October 2022.

Note: Flags indicate national team as defined under FIFA eligibility rules; some limited exceptions apply. Players may hold more than one non-FIFA nationality.

| No. | Pos. | Nation | Player |
|---|---|---|---|
| 2 | DF | CZE | Matyáš Hanč |
| 4 | DF | CZE | Jan Halász |
| 5 | DF | CZE | Robin Hranáč (on loan from Viktoria Plzeň) |
| 6 | MF | CZE | Marek Icha (on loan from Slavia Prague) |
| 7 | MF | CZE | Kamil Vacek |
| 8 | FW | CZE | Ondřej Chvěja (on loan from Baník Ostrava) |
| 9 | FW | CZE | Pavel Černý |
| 11 | MF | CZE | Samuel Šimek |
| 12 | MF | CZE | Emil Tischler |
| 14 | MF | CZE | Jan Jeřábek |
| 15 | DF | CZE | Václav Svoboda |
| 16 | MF | CZE | Dominik Mareš |
| 17 | DF | CZE | Petr Kurka |
| 18 | DF | CZE | Martin Chlumecký (on loan from Baník Ostrava) |

| No. | Pos. | Nation | Player |
|---|---|---|---|
| 19 | MF | CZE | Michal Hlavatý |
| 20 | MF | CZE | Matěj Helešic |
| 23 | DF | BRA | Bernardo Rosa |
| 24 | MF | CZE | Tomáš Solil |
| 25 | FW | USA | Nana Akosah-Bempah |
| 26 | DF | CZE | Dominik Kostka |
| 27 | MF | CZE | Vojtěch Sychra |
| 28 | MF | CZE | Adam Lupač |
| 30 | FW | CZE | Marek Červenka (on loan from Dukla Prague) |
| 32 | GK | CZE | Jakub Markovič (on loan from Slavia Prague) |
| 35 | FW | BRA | Leandro Lima |
| 39 | MF | CZE | Dominik Janošek |
| 87 | GK | CZE | Nicolas Šmíd |
| 93 | GK | SVK | Viktor Budinský (on loan from Baník Ostrava) |

=== Out on loan ===
Note: Flags indicate national team as defined under FIFA eligibility rules; some limited exceptions apply. Players may hold more than one non-FIFA nationality.

| No. | Pos. | Nation | Player |
|---|---|---|---|
| — | GK | CZE | Jiří Letáček (at Baník Ostrava) |
| — | FW | CZE | David Huf (at Dukla Prague) |

== Pre-season and friendlies ==
Win Draw Loss Fixtures

== Competitions ==
=== Overall record ===
| Competition | First match | Last match | Starting round | Final position | Record | | | | | | | |
| Competition | First match | Last match | Starting round | Final position | Pld | W | D | L | GF | GA | GD | Win % |
|---|---|---|---|---|---|---|---|---|---|---|---|---|
| Czech First League | 31 July 2022 | 28 May 2023 | Matchday 1 | 14th | 35 | 11 | 4 | 20 | 38 | 63 | −25 | 31.43 |
| Czech Cup | 14 September 2022 | 14 September 2022 | Second round | Second round | 1 | 0 | 0 | 1 | 0 | 1 | −1 | 0.00 |
| Total | | | | | 36 | 11 | 4 | 21 | 38 | 64 | −26 | 30.56 |

Source: Soccerway

=== Czech First League ===
==== Results summary ====
| Overall | | | | | | | | Home | | | | | | Away | | | | | |
| Pld | W | D | L | GF | GA | GD | Pts | W | D | L | GF | GA | GD | W | D | L | GF | GA | GD |
|---|---|---|---|---|---|---|---|---|---|---|---|---|---|---|---|---|---|---|---|
| 35 | 11 | 4 | 20 | 38 | 63 | −25 | 37 | 7 | 2 | 8 | 18 | 23 | −5 | 4 | 2 | 12 | 20 | 40 | −20 |

Source: Fortuna Liga

==== Regular season ====
===== League table =====
| Pos | Team | Pld | W | D | L | GF | GA | GD | Pts | Qualification or relegation |
|---|---|---|---|---|---|---|---|---|---|---|
| 12 | Baník Ostrava | 30 | 9 | 8 | 13 | 43 | 42 | +1 | 35 | Qualification for the relegation group |
| 13 | Teplice | 30 | 8 | 8 | 14 | 38 | 63 | −25 | 32 | Qualification for the relegation group |
| 14 | Zbrojovka Brno | 30 | 8 | 7 | 15 | 40 | 56 | −16 | 31 | Qualification for the relegation group |
| 15 | Pardubice | 30 | 8 | 4 | 18 | 29 | 58 | −29 | 28 | Qualification for the relegation group |
| 16 | Trinity Zlín | 30 | 5 | 11 | 14 | 37 | 55 | −18 | 26 | Qualification for the relegation group |

Source: Fortuna Liga
Rules for classification: 1) Points; 2) Head-to-head points; 3) Head-to-head goal difference; 4) Head-to-head goals scored; 5) Goal difference; 6) Goals scored; 7) Fair-play ranking; 8) Draw.

===== Results by round =====
| Round | 1 | 2 | 3 | 4 | 5 | 6 | 7 | 8 | 9 | 10 | 11 | 12 | 13 | 14 | 15 | 16 | 17 | 18 | 19 | 20 | 21 | 22 | 23 | 24 | 25 | 26 | 27 | 28 | 29 | 30 |
|---|---|---|---|---|---|---|---|---|---|---|---|---|---|---|---|---|---|---|---|---|---|---|---|---|---|---|---|---|---|---|
| Ground | H | A | H | A | H | A | H | A | H | A | H | A | H | A | A | H | A | H | A | H | A | H | A | H | A | H | A | H | H | A |
| Result | L | L | W | L | L | L | L | L | L | L | W | L | L | W | L | D | D | L | W | W | D | D | L | W | L | L | L | W | W | L |
| Position | 14 | 16 | 12 | 13 | 16 | 16 | 16 | 16 | 16 | 16 | 16 | 16 | 16 | 16 | 16 | 16 | 16 | 16 | 16 | 16 | 15 | 15 | 16 | 14 | 16 | 16 | 16 | 15 | 15 | 15 |

Source: Fortuna Liga
A = Away; H = Home; W = Win; D = Draw; L = Loss

===== Matches =====
The league fixtures were announced on 22 June 2022.

| 31 July 2022 1 | Pardubice | 0–2 | České Budějovice | Prague |
| 16:00 CEST (UTC+2) | | Report | Hellebrand 8'; Králik 67' | Stadium: Ďolíček; Attendance: 926; Referee: Tomáš Klíma |

| 6 August 2022 2 | Viktoria Plzeň | 2–1 | Pardubice | Plzeň |
| 16:00 CEST (UTC+2) | Kliment 21'; Havel 75' | Report | Solil 55' | Stadium: Doosan Arena; Attendance: 7,251; Referee: Miroslav Zelinka |

| 14 August 2022 3 | Pardubice | 2–1 | Slovan Liberec | Prague |
| 16:00 CEST (UTC+2) | Hlavatý 43', (yellow card) 90'; Vlček 45+1', (yellow card) 47'; Markovič (yellow card) 90+3'; Kostka (yellow card) 90+5' | Report | Kozák 48'; Matoušek (yellow card) 64'; Čech (goalkeeper coach) (yellow card) 83' | Stadium: Ďolíček; Attendance: 967; Referee: Lukáš Nehasil |

| 21 August 2022 4 | Slavia Prague | 7–0 | Pardubice | Prague |
| 19:00 CEST (UTC+2) | Douděra 31'; Tecl 40', 49', 57'; Lingr 77'; Usor 79', 89', (yellow card) 84' | Report | Hranáč (yellow card) 20' (yellow-red card) 44'; Vacek (yellow card) 44'; Krejčí (assistant coach) (yellow card) 44'; Janošek (yellow card) 66'; Červenka (yellow card) 69' | Stadium: Fortuna Arena; Attendance: 13,269; Referee: Marek Radina |

| 27 August 2022 5 | Pardubice | 0–3 | Mladá Boleslav | Prague |
| 16:00 CEST (UTC+2) | | Report | Škoda 5', 10'; Kubista 35' | Stadium: Ďolíček; Attendance: 649; Referee: Ondřej Berka |

| 30 August 2022 6 | Trinity Zlín | 2–1 | Pardubice | Zlín |
| 17:30 CEST (UTC+2) | Hlavatý 39' (o.g.); Hrubý 74' | Report | Sychra 71' | Stadium: Letná Stadion; Attendance: 3,610; Referee: Miroslav Zelinka |

| 4 September 2022 7 | Pardubice | 0–2 | Sigma Olomouc | Prague |
| 16:00 CEST (UTC+2) | | Report | Pokorný 45+2'; Růsek 76' | Stadium: Ďolíček; Attendance: 636; Referee: Petr Hocek |

| 11 September 2022 8 | Baník Ostrava | 3–0 | Pardubice | Ostrava |
| 16:00 CEST (UTC+2) | Tetour 35' (pen.); Tijani 75'; Kuzmanović 82' | Report | | Stadium: Městský stadion Attendance: 7,168; Referee: Lukáš Nehasil |

| 18 September 2022 9 | Pardubice | 0–1 | Bohemians 1905 | Prague |
| 16:00 CEST (UTC+2) | | Report | Jánoš 55' | Stadium: Ďolíček; Attendance: 2,047; Referee: Jan Machálek |

| 2 October 2022 10 | Teplice | 5–1 | Pardubice | Teplice |
| 16:00 CEST (UTC+2) | Vondrášek 22'; Žák 42', 73', 82', (yellow card) 58'; Kučera 59' | Report | Tischler (yellow card) 34'; Černý (yellow card) 46'; Hlavatý 90+2' | Stadium: Na Stínadlech; Attendance: 2,614; Referee: Petr Hocek |

| 8 October 2022 11 | Pardubice | 1–0 | Jablonec | Prague |
| 16:00 CEST (UTC+2) | Hlavatý 71'; Vacek (yellow card) 90+5'; Chlumecký (yellow card) 90+5' | Report | Krob (yellow card) 56' | Stadium: Ďolíček; Attendance: 629; Referee: Miroslav Zelinka |

| 15 October 2022 12 | Sparta Prague | 5–2 | Pardubice | Prague |
| 19:00 CEST (UTC+2) | Sørensen 8'; Kuchta 26'; Sadílek 60'; Minchev 72'; Wiesner 74' | Report | Janošek 15'; Sychra] 66' | Stadium: Stadion Letná; Attendance: 11,671; Referee: Dalibor Černý |

| 22 October 2022 13 | Pardubice | 1–3 | Zbrojovka Brno | Prague |
| 16:00 CEST (UTC+2) | Černý (yellow card) 23'; Mareš 80'; Vlček (yellow card) 90+2' | Report | Řezníček 40', 50', 74'; Berkovec (yellow card) 86'; Pachlopník (yellow card) 90+2' | Stadium: Ďolíček; Attendance: 877; Referee: Ladislav Szikszay |

| 29 October 2022 14 | Hradec Králové | 1–3 | Pardubice | Mladá Boleslav (Note: Hradec Králové played their home matches in Mladá Boleslav due to the rebuilding of their own Všesportovní stadion, which would finish in June 2023.) |
| 15:00 CEST (UTC+2) | Kubala 58' | Report | Janošek 50', 76'; Černý 71' | Stadium: Lokotrans Aréna; Attendance: 2,019; Referee: Ondřej Berka |

| 6 November 2022 15 | Slovácko | 1–0 | Pardubice | Uherské Hradiště |
| 15:00 CET (UTC+1) | Tomič 55' | Report | | Stadium: Městský fotbalový stadion Miroslava Valenty; Attendance: 4,230; Referee: Dominik Starý |

| 13 November 2022 16 | Pardubice | 1–1 | Viktoria Plzeň | Prague |
| 15:00 CET (UTC+1) | Černý 56' | Report | Havel 76' | Stadium: Ďolíček; Attendance: 1,469; Referee: Lukáš Nehasil |

| 29 January 2023 17 | Slovan Liberec | 1–1 | Pardubice | Liberec |
| 15:00 CET (UTC+1) | Vliegen (yellow card) 22'; Ghali (yellow card) 33'; Olatunji 40' | Report | Plechatý 47' (o.g.); Šimek (yellow card) 90+2' | Stadium: Stadion u Nisy; Attendance: 1,508; Referee: Pavel Orel |

| 4 February 2023 18 | Pardubice | 0–2 | Slavia Prague | Pardubice |
| 18:00 CEST (UTC+2) | Šimek (yellow card) 90+3' | Report | Jurečka 19' (pen.); Ousou (yellow card) 44' (yellow-red card) 90'; Lingr (yellow card) 49'; Santos (yellow card) 62'; Douděra (yellow card) 89'; Olayinka 90+5' | Stadium: CFIG Arena; Attendance: 4,620; Referee: Jan Machálek |

| 12 February 2023 19 | Mladá Boleslav | 0–1 | Pardubice | Mladá Boleslav |
| 15:00 CET (UTC+1) | | Report | Janošek 23' | Stadium: Lokotrans Aréna; Attendance: 1,240; Referee: Ondřej Berka |

| 19 February 2023 20 | Pardubice | 2–1 | Trinity Zlín | Pardubice |
| 15:00 CET (UTC+1) | Janošek 7'; Krobot 69' | Report | Kovinič 90+4' | Stadium: CFIG Arena; Attendance: 4,130; Referee: Ladislav Szikszay |

| 26 February 2023 21 | Sigma Olomouc | 2–2 | Pardubice | Olomouc |
| 15:00 CET (UTC+1) | Vodháněl 61'; Chytil 90+8' (pen.) | Report | Hlavatý 59'; Janošek 100' | Stadium: Andrův stadion Attendance: 1,957; Referee: Lukáš Nehasil |

| 4 March 2023 22 | Pardubice | 1–1 | Baník Ostrava | Pardubice |
| 15:00 CET (UTC+1) | Černý 3' | Report | Cadu 35' (pen.) | Stadium: CFIG Arena; Attendance: 4,527; Referee: Petr Hocek |

| 12 March 2023 23 | Bohemians 1905 | 2–0 | Pardubice | Prague |
| 18:00 CET (UTC+1) | Hála 37'; Prekop 60' | Report | | Stadium: Ďolíček; Attendance: 4,579; Referee: Miroslav Zelinka |

| 19 March 2023 24 | Pardubice | 3–1 | Teplice | Pardubice |
| 15:00 CET (UTC+1) | Hlavatý 4'; Janošek 10' (pen.); Vacek 69' | Report | Kučera 21' | Stadium: CFIG Arena; Attendance: 4,210; Referee: Jan Machálek |

| 2 April 2023 25 | Jablonec | 1–0 | Pardubice | Jablonec nad Nisou |
| 16:00 CEST (UTC+2) | Chramosta 89', (yellow card) 89' | Report | Vacek (yellow card) 47' | Stadium: Stadion Střelnice; Attendance: 1,637; Referee: Jan Všetečka |

| 9 April 2023 26 | Pardubice | 0–2 | Sparta Prague | Pardubice |
| 19:00 CEST (UTC+2) | | Report | Kuchta 20'; Krejčí 37' | Stadium: CFIG Arena; Attendance: 4,620; Referee: Dalibor Černý |

| 16 April 2023 27 | Zbrojovka Brno | 2–1 | Pardubice | Brno |
| 16:00 CEST (UTC+2) | Řezníček 47', 76' | Report | Pikul (yellow card) 75'; Krobot 90+3' | Stadium: ADAX Invest Arena; Attendance: 5,025; Referee: Pavel Orel |

| 22 April 2023 28 | Pardubice | 1–0 | Hradec Králové | Pardubice |
| 16:00 CEST (UTC+2) | Černý 56' | Report | | Stadium: CFIG Arena; Attendance: 4 450; Referee: Ladislav Szikszay |

| 25 April 2023 29 | Pardubice | 3–1 | Slovácko | Pardubice |
| 17:30 CEST (UTC+2) | Janošek 55'; Reinberk 57' (o.g.); Pikul 73' | Report | Reinberk 34' | Stadium: CFIG Arena; Attendance: 4,230; Referee: Marek Radina |

| 30 April 2023 30 | České Budějovice | 3–1 | Pardubice | České Budějovice |
| 15:00 CEST (UTC+2) | Čermák 42', 67'; Čavoš 54' | Report | Hranáč 89' | Stadium: Stadion Střelecký ostrov Attendance: 3,109; Referee: Miroslav Zelinka |

==== Relegation group ====
| Pos | Team | Pld | W | D | L | GF | GA | GD | Pts | Qualification or relegation | OST | TEP | JAB | PCE | ZLN | BRN |
|---|---|---|---|---|---|---|---|---|---|---|---|---|---|---|---|---|
| 11 | Baník Ostrava | 35 | 11 | 9 | 15 | 53 | 50 | +3 | 42 | | — | 2–1 | — | 2–4 | — | 4–0 |
| 12 | Teplice | 35 | 11 | 9 | 15 | 45 | 67 | −22 | 42 | | — | — | — | 1–0 | 2–1 | 1–1 |
| 13 | Jablonec | 35 | 10 | 10 | 15 | 49 | 63 | −14 | 40 | | 1–1 | 0–2 | — | — | — | 1–0 |
| 14 | Pardubice (O) | 35 | 11 | 4 | 20 | 38 | 63 | −25 | 37 | Qualification for the relegation play-offs | — | — | 2–0 | — | 1–2 | — |
| 15 | Trinity Zlín (O) | 35 | 7 | 13 | 15 | 43 | 60 | −17 | 34 | Qualification for the relegation play-offs | 2–1 | — | 1–1 | — | — | — |
| 16 | Zbrojovka Brno (R) | 35 | 8 | 9 | 18 | 41 | 64 | −23 | 33 | Relegation to FNL | — | — | — | 0–2 | 0–0 | — |

Source: Fortuna Liga
Legend: Blue = home team win; Yellow = draw; Red = away team win.
Rules for classification: 1) Total points; 2) Points earned in regular season; 3) Head-to-head points (regular season); 4) Head-to-head goal difference (regular season); 5) Head-to-head goals scored (regular season); 5) Goal difference (all matches); 6) Goals scored (all matches); 7) Fair-play ranking; 8) Draw.
(O) Play-off winners; (R) Relegated

===== Results by round =====
| Round | 1 | 2 | 3 | 4 | 5 |
|---|---|---|---|---|---|
| Ground | A | A | H | H | A |
| Result | L | W | L | W | W |
| Position | 15 | 15 | 15 | 14 | 14 |

Source: Fortuna Liga
A = Away; H = Home; W = Win; D = Draw; L = Loss

===== Matches =====
| 6 May 2023 31 | Teplice | 1–0 | Pardubice | Teplice |
| 15:00 CEST (UTC+2) | Trubač 15' | Report | | Stadium: Na Stínadlech; Attendance: 3,263; Referee: Dalibor Černý |

| 14 May 2023 32 | Zbrojovka Brno | 0–2 | Pardubice | Brno |
| 15:00 CEST (UTC+2) | Štěrba (yellow card) 77' | Report | Hlavatý (yellow card) 24'; Chlumecký 34'; Nita (yellow card) 74'; Krobot 90+5' | Stadium: ADAX Invest Arena; Attendance: 5,218; Referee: Ladislav Szikszay |

| 21 May 2023 33 | Pardubice | 1–2 | Trinity Zlín | Pardubice |
| 15:00 CEST (UTC+2) | Černý 25' | Report | Balaj 36'; Fantiš 86' | Stadium: CFIG Arena; Attendance: 4,620; Referee: Dalibor Černý |

| 24 May 2023 34 | Pardubice | 2–0 | Jablonec | Pardubice |
| 19:00 CEST (UTC+2) | Sychra 8'; Černý 26'; Vacek (yellow card) 61' | Report | Štěpánek (yellow card) 90+1' | Stadium: CFIG Arena; Attendance: 4,143; Referee: Ondřej Berka |

| 28 May 2023 35 | Baník Ostrava | 2–4 | Pardubice | Ostrava |
| 17:00 CEST (UTC+2) | Tijani 1', 74' (pen.) | Report | Darmovzal 45', 51'; Krobot 48'; Lima 83' | Stadium: Městský stadion Attendance: 5,605; Referee: Josef Krejsa |
