= 2021–22 FK Pardubice season =

Pardubice
2021–22 season
- Chairman: Vladimír Pitter
- Manager: Jiří Krejčí
- Stadium: Ďolíček (Note: Pardubice continued playing their home matches in Ďolíček due to the rebuilding of their own stadium Pod Vinicí.) (Temporary venue)
- Czech First League: 11th
- Czech Cup: Third round
Home colours	Away colours

The 2021–22 season was the 29th season in the existence of FK Pardubice and the club's 8th consecutive season in the top flight of Czech football. In addition to the domestic league, Pardubice participated in this season's edition of the Czech Cup.

== Players ==
=== First-team squad ===
As of 2 July 2021.

Note: Flags indicate national team as defined under FIFA eligibility rules; some limited exceptions apply. Players may hold more than one non-FIFA nationality.

No.	Pos.	Nation	Player
1	GK	CZE	Štěpán Hrnčíř
2	DF	CZE	Jan Prosek
3	DF	CZE	Tomáš Čelůstka
6	DF	CZE	Martin Toml
8	DF	CZE	Filip Čihák
9	FW	CZE	Pavel Černý
10	MF	KOR	Lee Sang-hyeok
11	MF	CZE	Samuel Šimek
12	MF	CZE	Emil Tischler
13	DF	CZE	Martin Šejvl
14	MF	CZE	Jan Jeřábek
15	DF	CZE	Tomáš Kubart
17	DF	CZE	Petr Kurka
20	MF	BRA	Cadu
21	FW	CZE	David Huf

No.	Pos.	Nation	Player
22	GK	CZE	Jiří Letáček
24	MF	CZE	Tomáš Solil
25	MF	CZE	Matěj Vít
26	FW	CZE	Dominik Kostka
27	MF	CZE	Vojtěch Sychra
30	GK	CZE	Nicolas Šmíd
31	GK	CZE	Marek Boháč
—	GK	CZE	Jakub Markovič (on loan from Slavia Prague)
—	MF	CZE	Michal Beran (on loan from Slavia Prague)
—	MF	CZE	Lukáš Červ (on loan from Slavia Prague)
—	MF	CZE	Pavel Sokol
—	MF	BRA	Junior Ramos
—	MF	CZE	Jan Nikodém
—	MF	CZE	Daniel Kovář

=== Out on loan ===
Note: Flags indicate national team as defined under FIFA eligibility rules; some limited exceptions apply. Players may hold more than one non-FIFA nationality.

No.	Pos.	Nation	Player
—	FW	CZE	Michal Petráň (at FK Fotbal Třinec)

== Pre-season and friendlies ==
Win Draw Loss Fixtures

== Competitions ==
=== Overall record ===
Competition	First match	Last match	Starting round	Final position	Record							
Competition	First match	Last match	Starting round	Final position	Pld	W	D	L	GF	GA	GD	Win %
Czech First League	24 July 2021	14 May 2022	Matchday 1	11th	35	9	10	16	42	68	−26	25.71
Czech Cup	25 August 2021	21 September 2021	Second round	Third round	2	1	0	1	1	2	−1	50.00
Total					37	10	10	17	43	70	−27	27.03

Source: Soccerway

=== Czech First League ===
==== League table ====
Pos	Team	Pld	W	D	L	GF	GA	GD	Pts	Qualification or relegation
12	Teplice	30	8	3	19	29	49	−20	27	Qualification for the relegation group
13	Jablonec	30	4	14	12	22	45	−23	26	Qualification for the relegation group
14	Bohemians 1905	30	6	8	16	34	56	−22	26	Qualification for the relegation group
15	Pardubice	30	5	9	16	35	67	−32	24	Qualification for the relegation group
16	Karviná	30	3	8	19	30	52	−22	17	Qualification for the relegation group

Source: Fortuna Liga
Rules for classification: 1) Points; 2) Head-to-head points; 3) Head-to-head goal difference; 4) Head-to-head goals scored; 5) Goal difference; 6) Goals scored; 7) Fair-play ranking; 8) Draw.

Pos	Team	Pld	W	D	L	GF	GA	GD	Pts	Qualification or relegation	PCE	ZLN	JAB	BOH	TEP	KAR
11	Pardubice	35	9	10	16	42	68	−26	37		—	1–1	—	—	—	2–0
12	Fastav Zlín	35	9	9	17	43	60	−17	36		—	—	1–1	1–4	3–0	—
13	Jablonec	35	6	16	13	27	48	−21	34		0–1	—	—	1–1	—	2–0
14	Bohemians 1905 (O)	35	8	10	17	45	61	−16	34	Qualification for the relegation play-offs	0–1	—	—	—	—	4–0
15	Teplice (O)	35	8	5	22	33	59	−26	29	Qualification for the relegation play-offs	0–2	—	0–1	2–2	—	—
16	Karviná (R)	35	3	10	22	33	63	−30	19	Relegation to the FNL	—	1–1	—	—	2–2	—

Source: Fortuna Liga
Legend: Blue = home team win; Yellow = draw; Red = away team win.
Rules for classification: 1) Total points; 2) Points earned in regular season; 3) Head-to-head points (regular season); 4) Head-to-head goal difference (regular season); 5) Head-to-head goals scored (regular season); 5) Goal difference (all matches); 6) Goals scored (all matches); 7) Fair-play ranking; 8) Draw.
(O) Play-off winners; (R) Relegated

==== Results summary ====
Overall								Home						Away					
Pld	W	D	L	GF	GA	GD	Pts	W	D	L	GF	GA	GD	W	D	L	GF	GA	GD
35	9	10	16	42	68	−26	37	3	9	5	20	28	−8	6	1	11	22	40	−18

Source: Fortuna Liga

==== Results by round ====
Round	1	2	3	4	5	6	7	8	9	10	11	12	13	14	15	16	17	18	19	20	21	22	23	24	25	26	27	28	29	30
Ground	H	H	A																											
Result																														
Position																														

Updated to match(es) played on 31 July 2021. Source: Fortuna Liga
A = Away; H = Home; W = Win; D = Draw; L = Loss

==== Matches ====
24 July 2021 1	Pardubice	2–2	Karviná	Prague
16:00 CEST (UTC+2)	Tischler 64', 75'	Report	Qose 5' (pen.); Papadopulos 49'	Stadium: Ďolíček; Attendance: 805; Referee: Karel Hrubeš

31 July 2021 2	Sigma Olomouc	3–2	Pardubice	Olomouc
16:00 CEST (UTC+2)	Vepřek 8'; Zifčák 45'; Hála 52'	Report	Toml 20'; Solil 77'	Stadium: Andrův stadion Attendance: 2,465; Referee: Tomáš Klíma

8 August 2021 3	Pardubice	1–1	Mladá Boleslav	Prague
16:00 CEST (UTC+2)	Kostka 38'	Report	Skalák 75'	Stadium: Ďolíček; Attendance: 922; Referee: Ondřej Ginzel

15 August 2021 4	Baník Ostrava	3–1	Pardubice	Ostrava
16:00 CEST (UTC+2)	Tetour 54'; Dyjan 73'; Klíma 85'	Report	Kostka 72'	Stadium: Městský stadion Attendance: 5,723; Referee: Jan Petřík

21 August 2021 5	Pardubice	3–0	Bohemians 1905	Prague
16:00 CEST (UTC+2)	Chytil 31'; Černý 65'; Solil 83'	Report		Stadium: Ďolíček; Attendance: 2,384; Referee: Karel Hrubeš

28 August 2021 6	Slovácko	2–1	Pardubice	Uherské Hradiště
16:00 CEST (UTC+2)	Daníček 3'; Petržela 14'	Report	Cadu 62'	Stadium: Městský fotbalový stadion Miroslava Valenty; Attendance: 3,616; Referee: Jan Machálek

11 September 2021 7	Pardubice	2–2	Slovan Liberec	Prague
16:00 CEST (UTC+2)	Matějka 57', 73'	Report	Rondić 23'; Mészáros 37'	Stadium: Ďolíček; Attendance: 770; Referee: Miroslav Zelinka

17 September 2021 8	Hradec Králové	2–0	Pardubice	Mladá Boleslav (Note: Hradec Králové played their home matches in Mladá Boleslav due to the rebuilding of their own Všesportovní stadion.)
19:00 CEST (UTC+2)	Král 37'; Vašulín 88'	Report		Stadium: Lokotrans Aréna; Attendance: 1,605; Referee: Ladislav Szikszay

25 September 2021 9	Pardubice	0–1	Viktoria Plzeň	Prague
16:00 CEST (UTC+2)		Report	Hejda 75'	Stadium: Ďolíček; Attendance: 1,562; Referee: Petr Hocek

2 October 2021 10	České Budějovice	3–1	Pardubice	České Budějovice
16:00 CEST (UTC+2)	van Buren 26'; Hora 42'; Bassey 53'	Report	Šejvl 21'	Stadium: Stadion Střelecký ostrov Attendance: 1,898; Referee: Pavel Julínek

17 October 2021 11	Pardubice	2–4	Sparta Prague	Prague
19:00 CEST (UTC+2)	Cadu 55'; Huf 87'	Report	Minchev 20', 45+2'; Wiesner 28'; Pešek 60'	Stadium: Ďolíček; Attendance: 3,537; Referee: Ondřej Pechanec

23 October 2021 12	Pardubice	0–0	Fastav Zlín	Prague
16:00 CEST (UTC+2)		Report		Stadium: Ďolíček; Attendance: 582; Referee: Ondřej Ginzel

31 October 2021 13	Jablonec	1–1	Pardubice	Jablonec nad Nisou
15:00 CET (UTC+1)	Čvančara 10'	Report	Tischler 30'	Stadium: Stadion Střelnice; Attendance: 2,444; Referee: Tomáš Batík

7 November 2021 14	Pardubice	0–5	Slavia Prague	Prague
15:00 CET (UTC+1)		Report	Krmenčík 58', 63'; Lingr 64', 75'; Ekpai 81'	Stadium: Ďolíček; Attendance: 3,492; Referee: Jan Petřík

21 November 2021 15	Teplice	1–2	Pardubice	Teplice
15:00 CET (UTC+1)	Chlumecký 90+8'	Report	Chytil 39'; Červ 79' (pen.)	Stadium: Na Stínadlech; Attendance: 1,548; Referee: Ladislav Szikszay

27 November 2021 16	Pardubice	1–5	Sigma Olomouc	Prague
15:00 CET (UTC+1)	Tischler 16'	Report	Růsek 13'; Zmrzlý 23'; Poulolo 49'; González 68'; Látal 79'	Stadium: Ďolíček; Attendance: 458; Referee: Dalibor Černý

5 December 2021 17	Mladá Boleslav	2–3	Pardubice	Mladá Boleslav
15:00 CET (UTC+1)	Ewerton 56'; Fila 90+2'	Report	Cadu 8'; Chytil 10', 18'	Stadium: Lokotrans Aréna; Attendance: 489; Referee: Pavel Orel

11 December 2021 18	Pardubice	0–3	Baník Ostrava	Prague
15:00 CET (UTC+1)		Report	Buchta 19'; Kuzmanovič 32'; Sor 76'	Stadium: Ďolíček; Attendance: 537; Referee: Ondřej Berka

18 December 2021 19	Bohemians 1905	1–2	Pardubice	Prague
15:00 CET (UTC+1)	Necid 67'	Report	Chytil 22'; Černý 56'	Stadium: Ďolíček; Attendance: 1,000; Referee: Miroslav Zelinka

19 February 2022 22	Pardubice	0–0	Hradec Králové	Prague
15:00 CET (UTC+1)		Report		Stadium: Ďolíček; Attendance: 1,237; Referee: Jan Petřík

22 February 2022 20	Pardubice	0–0	Slovácko	Prague
17:00 CET (UTC+1)		Report		Stadium: Ďolíček; Attendance: 528; Referee: Tomáš Klíma
Note: The match was originally scheduled for 6 February 2022, but was postponed due to the isolation and quarantine measures imposed on the Pardubice team.

26 February 2022 23	Viktoria Plzeň	4–0	Pardubice	Plzeň
18:00 CET (UTC+1)	Hejda 34'; Kopic 44'; Havel 49'; Chorý 90+1'	Report		Stadium: Doosan Arena; Attendance: 6,184; Referee: Josef Krejsa

5 March 2022 24	Pardubice	3–3	České Budějovice	Prague
15:00 CET (UTC+1)	Solil 27'; Vacek 50'; Cadu 71' (pen.)	Report	Hora 45'; Havel 57'; Čolić 87'	Stadium: Ďolíček; Attendance: 645; Referee: Miroslav Zelinka

9 March 2022 21	Slovan Liberec	4–1	Pardubice	Liberec
16:30 CET (UTC+1)	Mikula 11'; Rabušic 26' (pen.), 30'; Rondić 76'	Report	Huf 15'	Stadium: Stadion u Nisy; Attendance: 1,550; Referee: Michal Křepský
Note: The match was originally scheduled for 12 February 2022, but was postponed due to the isolation and quarantine measures imposed on the Pardubice team.

13 March 2022 25	Sparta Prague	3–1	Pardubice	Prague
18:00 CET (UTC+1)	L. Krejčí II 60'; Minchev 85'; Haraslín 89'	Report	Černý 90+2'	Stadium: Generali Arena; Attendance: 6,132; Referee: Ladislav Szikszay

19 March 2022 26	Fastav Zlín	4–1	Pardubice	Zlín
15:00 CET (UTC+1)	Vukadinović 13', 74'; Janetzký 16'; Dramé 84'	Report	Rezek 41'	Stadium: Letná Stadion; Attendance: 2,407; Referee: Tomáš Klíma

3 April 2022 27	Pardubice	1–1	Jablonec	Prague
16:00 CEST (UTC+2)	Huf 48'	Report	Malínský 36'	Stadium: Ďolíček; Attendance: 665; Referee: Miroslav Zelinka

10 April 2022 28	Slavia Prague	4–0	Pardubice	Prague
19:00 CEST (UTC+2)	Provod 41' (pen.), 54'; Schranz 62'; Traoré 84'	Report		Stadium: Sinobo Stadium; Attendance: 10,386; Referee: Dalibor Černý

17 April 2022 29	Pardubice	2–0	Teplice	Prague
17:00 CEST (UTC+2)	Jeřábek 32'; Kostka 75'	Report		Stadium: Ďolíček; Attendance: 897; Referee: Tomáš Klíma

20 April 2022 30	Karviná	3–2	Pardubice	Karviná
18:00 CEST (UTC+2)	Papadopulos 3'; Buchta 70'; Durosinmi 87'	Report	Černý 4'; Červ 56'	Stadium: Městský stadion Attendance: 1,215; Referee: Marek Radina

==== Relegation group ====
23 April 2022 31	Jablonec	0–1	Pardubice	Jablonec nad Nisou
17:00 CEST (UTC+2)		Report	Solil 71'	Stadium: Stadion Střelnice; Attendance: 1,613; Referee: Zbyněk Proske

1 May 2022 32	Bohemians 1905	0–1	Pardubice	Prague
16:00 CEST (UTC+2)		Report	Hranáč 8'	Stadium: Ďolíček; Attendance: 3,955; Referee: Dalibor Černý

7 May 2022 33	Pardubice	2–0	Karviná	Prague
16:00 CEST (UTC+2)	Čihák 33'; Čelůstka 41'	Report		Stadium: Ďolíček; Attendance: 628; Referee: Ladislav Szikszay

10 May 2022 34	Pardubice	1–1	Fastav Zlín	Prague
19:00 CEST (UTC+2)	Patrák 39'	Report	Simerský 75'	Stadium: Ďolíček; Attendance: 605; Referee: Miroslav Zelinka

14 May 2022 35	Teplice	0–2	Pardubice	Teplice
18:00 CEST (UTC+2)		Report	Bulmaga 37' (o.g.); Čihák 69'	Stadium: Na Stínadlech; Attendance: 1,228; Referee: Jan Machálek

=== Czech Cup ===
25 August 2021 Second round	Sokol Hostouň	0–1 (a.e.t.)	Pardubice	Hostouň
17:00 CEST (UTC+2)	Sychra 99'	Report		Stadium: Stadion Vojtěcha Zeithamla

21 September 2021 Third round	Vysočina Jihlava	2–0	Pardubice	Jihlava
17:00 CEST (UTC+2)	Arroyo 11'; M. Tureček 56'	Report		Stadium: Stadion v Jiráskově ulici Referee: Ondřej Cieslar
