= Matyas =

Matyas may refer to:

- Mátyás, Hungarian name
- Matyáš, Czech name
