= Antonín Kinský (footballer, born 2003) =

Czech footballer (born 2003)

Personal information
- Date of birth: 13 March 2003 (age 23)
- Place of birth: Prague, Czech Republic
- Height: 1.90 m (6 ft 3 in)
- Position: Goalkeeper

Team information
- Current team: Tottenham Hotspur
- Number: 31

Youth career
- 2009–2017: Tempo Prague
- 2017–2018: Bohemians 1905
- 2018–2020: Dukla Prague

Senior career*
Years	Team	Apps	(Gls)
2020–2021	Dukla Prague	6	(0)
2021–2025	Slavia Prague	19	(0)
2022–2023	→ Vyškov (loan)	43	(0)
2023–2024	→ Pardubice (loan)	18	(0)
2025–	Tottenham Hotspur	23	(0)

International career^{‡}
2017	Czech Republic U15	3	(0)
2019	Czech Republic U16	3	(0)
2019–2020	Czech Republic U17	3	(0)
2021–2022	Czech Republic U19	8	(0)
2022	Czech Republic U20	1	(0)
2022–2024	Czech Republic U21	6	(0)
2026–	Czech Republic	2	(0)
- * Club domestic league appearances and goals as of 15 November 2026 ‡ National team caps and goals as of 15 November 2026

Antonín Kinský (born 13 March 2003) is a Czech professional footballer who plays as a goalkeeper for Premier League club Tottenham Hotspur and the Czech Republic national team.

== Club career ==
=== Youth career ===
Kinský played youth football for Tempo Prague, moving to Bohemians 1905 in 2017. In 2018, at the age of 15, he moved to Dukla Prague.

=== Early career ===
Kinský made his senior debut for Dukla Prague on 14 July 2020, in a 2–1 Czech National Football League win against Třinec. He made his Czech Cup debut on 26 August of the same year, keeping a clean sheet for Dukla in a 4–0 away win against Admira Prague. In July 2021 he transferred to Slavia Prague, signing a four-year contract. He was repeatedly called the greatest Czech goalkeeping talent of his generation.

Between 2022 and 2024, Kinský was on loan in MFK Vyškov and FK Pardubice. He made his Czech First League debut on 22 July 2023, at the age of 20, in Pardubice's 0–1 home loss against Bohemians 1905. He was shown the red card in Pardubice's second league match of the season, receiving a four-match suspension, and went on to miss a number of further matches due to injury. His next league appearance came in December 2023, when he played in a 2–1 loss against Sparta Prague, before keeping the first First League clean sheet of his career in a 2–0 win against Slovan Liberec the same month. Having played just four times before the mid-season break, Kinský went on to feature for Pardubice 14 times in the second half of the season before returning to his parent club.

After the 2023–24 season, Kinský originally decided not to extend his contract in Slavia. Following an injury to Slavia's number one goalkeeper Jindřich Staněk, before the 2024–25 season, the club offered Kinský the position of number one goalkeeper. Based on that, Kinský changed his decision and extended his contract in Slavia Prague. He conceded just one goal in his first nine league matches of the 2024–25 season.

=== Tottenham Hotspur ===
==== 2024–25 season ====
On 5 January 2025, Kinský signed for Premier League side Tottenham Hotspur on a six-and-a-half year deal for an estimated £12.5m. He made his debut on 8 January in the first leg of the EFL Cup semi-final against Liverpool, keeping a clean sheet in a 1–0 win. Kinský was not eligible to play for Tottenham in the knockout phase of the 2024–25 UEFA Europa League and was not listed in the squad, but the club awarded him a medal after winning the competition.

==== 2025–26 season ====
Kinský made his first competitive appearance of the season for Spurs in the EFL Cup on 24 September 2025 against Doncaster Rovers. He kept a clean sheet as Tottenham won the match 3–0. He also played the club's next EFL Cup match which was against Newcastle United on 29 October. Spurs lost 2–0 and head coach Thomas Frank highlighted an error from Kinský which led to the second goal.

"I have never seen that on a football pitch. It will be soul-destroying for Kinsky. I would not be surprised if he was in tears. It is a difficult thing to handle.

It is selfish from the manager. He knows he will not be here for long. It is clearly for self-preservation and with no consideration for the young goalkeeper. The manager certainly has not helped his case."

— Paul Robinson, commenting on Kinský's substitution against Atlético Madrid

Kinsky made his first UEFA Champions League appearance for Spurs on 10 March 2026, in a 5–2 away defeat to Atlético Madrid in the first leg of the round of 16. He made two crucial mistakes early on that led to opposition goals and was substituted after just 17 minutes. Manager Igor Tudor drew significant criticism for his handling of the situation, and for his refusal to acknowledge Kinský as he left the pitch. Tudor was sacked shortly thereafter.

On 20 March 2026, first-choice goalkeeper Vicario underwent hernia surgery, opening the door for Kinský to return to first team action. Kinský made his first league appearance of the season on 12 April 2026 against Sunderland, but he was beaten by a deflected shot in a 1–0 loss for Spurs.

On 11 May 2026, Kinský made a stoppage time save against Sean Longstaff in a 1–1 draw with Leeds United that was described as "one of the saves of the season." This save was later nominated for the Premier League Save of the Season award. Two weeks later, on 24 May, he kept a clean sheet in a 1–0 victory over Everton on the final matchday, including a flying save from a stoppage-time shot by Tyrique George, securing his club's survival in the Premier League. On 30 June, he signed a new improved contract with the club.

== International career ==
Kinský was a regular member of the youth national teams. He regularly played for the Czech youth national teams since the U15 category. He was originally in the Czech Republic U21 squad for the 2023 UEFA European Under-21 Championship, but he had to be replaced due to injury.

Kinský received his first call-up for the Czech Republic senior team in October 2024 ahead of Nations League matches against Albania and Ukraine. In May 2026, he was named in the Czech Republic's 54-man preliminary squad for the 2026 FIFA World Cup. However, he was later excluded from the final squad after opting to undergo surgery.

On 3 October 2026, Kinský made his debut in a 2026–27 UEFA Nations League A game against Spain.

== Personal life ==
Kinský is the son of Antonín Kinský, who is a former member of the Czech national team, winner of the Czech First League and part of his national team's squad at UEFA Euro 2004.

== Career statistics ==
=== Club ===
As of match played 31 October 2026

Appearances and goals by club, season and competition
Club	Season	League			National cup (Note: Includes Czech Cup, FA Cup)		League cup (Note: Includes EFL Cup)		Europe		Other		Total	
Club	Season	Division	Apps	Goals	Apps	Goals	Apps	Goals	Apps	Goals	Apps	Goals	Apps	Goals
Dukla Prague	2019–20	Czech National League	1	0	0	0	—		—		—		1	0
Dukla Prague	2020–21	Czech National League	5	0	1	0	—		—		—		6	0
Dukla Prague	Total		6	0	1	0	—		—		—		7	0
Slavia Prague	2021–22	Czech First League	0	0	1	0	—		0	0	—		1	0
Slavia Prague	2024–25	Czech First League	19	0	0	0	—		10 (Note: Four appearances in UEFA Champions League, six appearances in UEFA Europa League)	0	—		29	0
Slavia Prague	Total		19	0	1	0	—		10	0	—		30	0
Vyškov (loan)	2021–22	Czech National League	13	0	—		—		—		—		13	0
Vyškov (loan)	2022–23	Czech National League	30	0	2	0	—		—		2 (Note: Appearances in Czech National League promotion play-offs)	0	34	0
Vyškov (loan)	Total		43	0	2	0	—		—		2	0	47	0
Pardubice (loan)	2023–24	Czech First League	18	0	0	0	—		—		—		18	0
Tottenham Hotspur	2024–25	Premier League	6	0	2	0	2	0	0	0	—		10	0
Tottenham Hotspur	2025–26	Premier League	7	0	0	0	2	0	1 (Note: Appearance in UEFA Champions League)	0	0	0	10	0
Tottenham Hotspur	2026–27	Premier League	9	0	0	0	1	0	0	0	—		10	0
Tottenham Hotspur	Total		22	0	2	0	5	0	1	0	0	0	30	0
Career total			108	0	6	0	5	0	11	0	2	0	132	0

=== International ===
As of match played 15 November 2026

Appearances and goals by national team and year
National team	Year	Apps	Goals
Czech Republic	2026	2	0
Total		2	0

== Honours ==
Slavia Prague

- Czech First League: 2024–25

Individual

- Czech Talent of the Year: 2024
