= Matyáš =

Matyáš is a Czech masculine given name, cognate to Matthew.

Notable people with the name include:

- Matyáš Bělohradský (born 2001), Czech figure skater
- Matyáš Démar (born 1991), Czech volleyball player
- Matyáš Hanč (born 2004), Czech football player
- Matyáš Jachnicki (born 1999), Czech volleyball player
- Vojtěch Matyáš Jírovec (1763–1850), Bohemian composer
- Matyáš Klang (born 1991), Czech rower
- Jindřich Matyáš Thurn (1567–1640), Czech (Bohemian) nobleman
- Josef Matyáš Trenkwald (1824–1897), Czech/Austrian painter
- Matyáš Vágner (born 2003), Czech football player
- Matyáš Žďárský (1856–1940), Czech/Austrian skiing pioneer

It is also sometimes found as a surname:

- Imrich Matyáš (1896–1974), Czechoslovak activist

== See also ==
- Mátyás, Hungarian given name
