= Trousil =

Trousil (feminine Trousilová) is a Czech surname. Notable people with the surname include:

- Jan Trousil (born 1976), Czech footballer
- Josef Trousil (born 1935), Czech athlete
