= Pavel Černý =

Pavel Černý may refer to:

- Pavel Černý (footballer, born 1962), Czech footballer
- Pavel Černý (footballer, born 1985), Czech footballer
