= Leandro Lima =

Leandro Lima may refer to:

- Leandro Lima (actor) (born 1982), Brazilian model and actor
- Leandro Lima (footballer, born 1985), Brazilian footballer
- Leandro Lima (footballer, born 2001) (2001–2025), Brazilian footballer
