= Luca Williams-Barnett =

English footballer (born 2008)

- Williams-Barnett for Tottenham Hotspur in 2026

Personal information
- Full name: Luca James Williams-Barnett
- Date of birth: 1 October 2008 (age 18)
- Place of birth: Luton, England
- Height: 5 ft 10 in (1.79 m)
- Positions: Midfielder; forward

Team information
- Current team: Tottenham Hotspur
- Number: 68

Youth career
- 2018–2025: Tottenham Hotspur

Senior career*
Years	Team	Apps	(Gls)
2025–	Tottenham Hotspur	3	(1)

International career^{‡}
2023	England U15	4	(2)
2023	England U16	2	(0)
2024–2025	England U17	13	(4)
2025	England U18	3	(2)
2026–	England U19	4	(2)
- * Club domestic league appearances and goals as of 17:06, 21 November 2026 (UTC) ‡ National team caps and goals as of 13:06, 22 October 2026 (UTC)

Luca James Williams-Barnett (born 1 October 2008) is an English professional footballer who plays as an attacking midfielder for Premier League club Tottenham Hotspur.

== Early life ==
Williams-Barnett was born on 1 October 2008 in Luton, England. He attended Lealands High School.

== Club career ==
Having previously played youth football for his hometown club Luton Town, Williams-Barnett joined the Tottenham Hotspur academy in 2018.

In the 2024–25 season, Williams-Barnett became a regular in the Under-18s team. He won Under-18 Premier League Goal of the Season for a long-range strike against Leicester City.

On 7 November 2024, Williams-Barnett was named in his first senior matchday squad in a UEFA Europa League match against Galatasaray.

On 24 September 2025, he made his senior debut for Tottenham Hotspur as an 87th-minute substitute in an EFL Cup win against Doncaster Rovers, becoming Spurs' youngest ever player in the competition at 16 years, 11 months and 24 days, as well as becoming the 900th player to have made a senior appearance for Tottenham.

Williams-Barnett signed his first professional contract with the club on 2 October 2025, the day after his 17th birthday.

In the 2025–26 season, Williams-Barnett made regular appearances for the Under-21s team. He scored his first career hat-trick in September against Leicester City, and subsequently scored five goals in a single game against Slavia Prague in December.

On 23 July 2026, he was included in Tottenham Hotspur's 35-man squad for their pre-season tour of Australia and New Zealand. On 31 October, Williams-Barnett made his Premier League debut, coming on as a substitute in a 2–0 win against Crystal Palace. On 21 November, Williams-Barnett made his first Premier League start for Tottenham Hotspur and scored his first senior goal for the club in a 2–0 victory against Ipswich Town.

== International career ==
Williams-Barnett is an England youth international and has played at U15, U16, U17, U18 and U19 levels.

In 2024, he played for England U17 during the 2025 UEFA European Under-17 Championship qualification and also played at the tournament itself.

On 3 September 2025, Williams-Barnett made a goalscoring England U18 debut during a 3–1 win over Uzbekistan.

On 21 October 2025, Williams-Barnett was included in the England U17 squad for the 2025 FIFA U-17 World Cup. He scored two goals in a group stage victory over Haiti. Williams-Barnett also started in the Round of 16 elimination against Austria.

On 25 September 2026, Williams-Barnett made his England U19 debut in a 1–0 win against Republic of Ireland U19s, coming on as a substitute for Max Dowman in the 81st-minute.

== Style of play ==
Williams-Barnett plays as a attacking midfielder, central midfielder or forward. Two-footed, he can also play as a winger. The English newspaper The Evening Standard wrote in 2024 that he is "known for his skills, dribbling and spectacular finishing".

== Career statistics ==
As of match played 21 November 2026

Appearances and goals by club, season and competition
Club	Season	League			FA Cup		EFL Cup		Europe		Other		Total	
Club	Season	Division	Apps	Goals	Apps	Goals	Apps	Goals	Apps	Goals	Apps	Goals	Apps	Goals
Tottenham Hotspur U21	2025–26	—			—		—		—		1 (Note: Appearance in EFL Trophy)	1	1	1
Tottenham Hotspur	2025–26	Premier League	0	0	0	0	1	0	0	0	0	0	1	0
Tottenham Hotspur	2026–27	Premier League	3	1	0	0	1	0	—		—		4	1
Tottenham Hotspur	Total		3	1	0	0	2	0	0	0	0	0	5	1
Career total			3	1	0	0	2	0	0	0	1	1	6	2
