= Tomáš Zlatohlávek =

Czech footballer (born 2000)

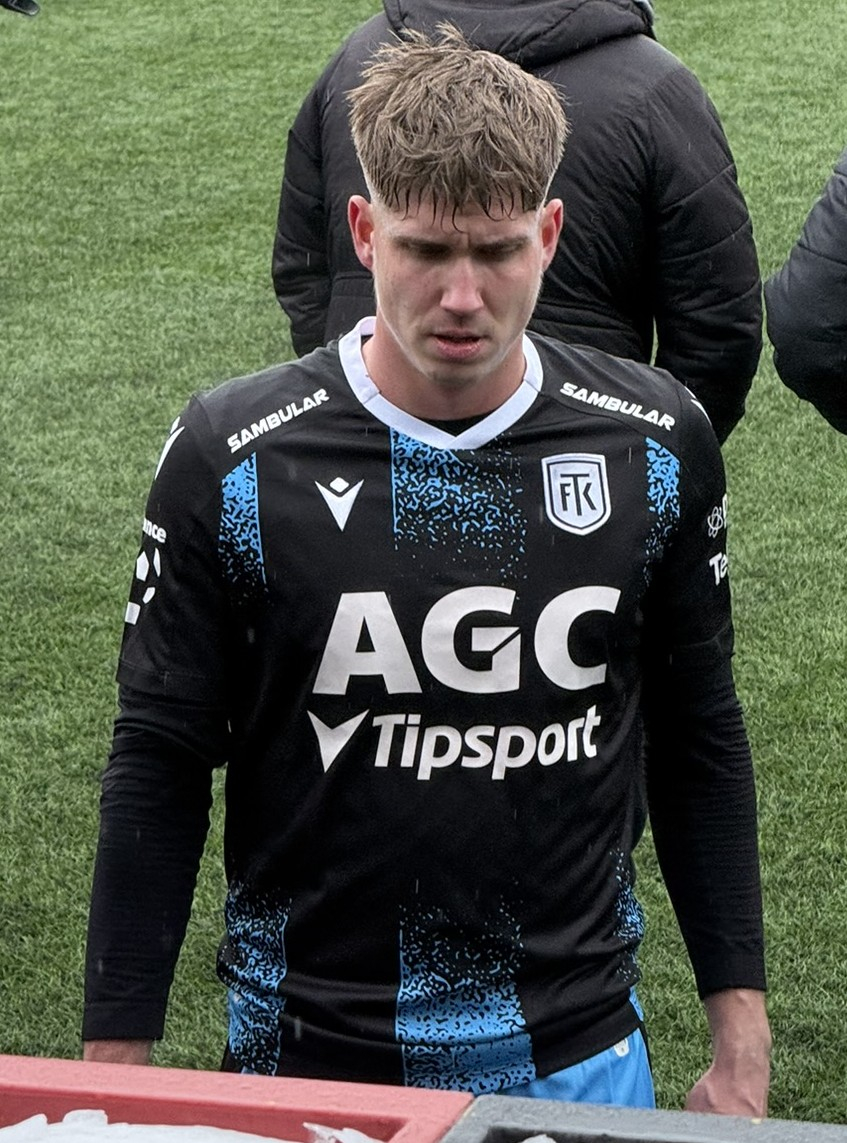
- Zlatohlávek playing for Teplice in 2026.

Personal information
- Date of birth: 22 May 2000 (age 26)
- Height: 1.83 m (6 ft 0 in)
- Position: Forward

Team information
- Current team: Teplice
- Number: 7

Youth career
- 2012–2019: Sigma Olomouc

Senior career*
Years	Team	Apps	(Gls)
2019–2022	Sigma Olomouc	6	(0)
2020	→ Třinec (loan)	7	(0)
2021	→ Prostějov (loan)	13	(5)
2021–2022	→ Vlašim (loan)	22	(8)
2023–2025	Pardubice	42	(9)
2025–2026	Baník Ostrava	24	(1)
2026–	Teplice	13	(0)

International career
2016	Czech Republic U17	1	(0)
2017–2018	Czech Republic U18	10	(6)
2018–2019	Czech Republic U19	10	(2)
2019	Czech Republic U20	1	(0)
2021–2022	Czech Republic U21	3	(0)
- * Club domestic league appearances and goals as of 27 May 2026

Tomáš Zlatohlávek (born 22 May 2000) is a Czech professional footballer player who currently plays for Czech First League club Teplice as a forward.

== Club career ==
=== Sigma Olomouc ===
Tomáš Zlatohlávek graduate of the SK Sigma Olomouc youth academy. He won the national youth league with the club in 2018 and later participated in the UEFA Youth League, in which Sigma beat Maribor and Maccabi Tel Aviv before being knocked out by the French club Lyon.

At his time with the club, he had been on loan at the second league clubs Třinec, Prostějov and Vlašim, where he was most successful in the 2021–22 season when he scored 8 goals. In his final season, he was a valid member of the B-team in the second league, starting in 23 matches and scoring 5 goals. In the top competition, Zlatohlávek played for the A team in five matches, and added another start in the Czech Cup. In total, he left Sigma with six first league starts.

=== Pardubice ===
On 27 June 2023, it was announced that Zlatohlávek would be joining Czech First League side FK Pardubice after being unable to find game time at Sigma Olomouc. He made his debut for the club in a 1–0 loss against Bohemians 1905.

=== Baník Ostrava ===
On 12 January 2025, it was announced that Zlatohlávek would be joining FC Baník Ostrava for a fee of 10 million CZK, signing a long-term contract. He scored his first goal for Baník in a 5–2 win over his former club FK Pardubice. He made his European debut for Baník in a 2–2 draw against Legia Warsaw in the 2025–26 UEFA Europa League qualifying, coming on as a substitute in the 82nd minute for Matěj Šín.

=== Teplice ===
On 5 January 2026, Zlatohlávek signed a contract with FK Teplice.
