= 2026–27 Tottenham Hotspur F.C. season =

145th Season in existence of Tottenham Hotspur FC

Tottenham Hotspur
2026–27 season
- Owner: ENIC International Ltd.
- Non-executive chairman: Peter Charrington
- Head coach: Roberto De Zerbi
- Stadium: Tottenham Hotspur Stadium
- Premier League: 11th
- FA Cup: Third round
- EFL Cup: Third round
- Top goalscorer: League: Jan Paul van Hecke (2); All: Ben Davies; Conor Gallagher; Dominic Solanke; Jan Paul van Hecke (2 each)
- Highest home attendance: 61,025 v Newcastle United, Premier League, 29 August 2026
- Lowest home attendance: 49,008 v Charlton Athletic, EFL Cup, 26 August 2026
- Average home league attendance: 60,777
- Biggest win: 5–1 v Charlton Athletic (H), EFL Cup, 26 August 2026
- Biggest defeat: 0–3 v Brentford (A), Premier League, 22 August 2026
Home colours	Away colours	Third colours
- All statistics correct as of 7 November 2026.

The 2026–27 season is the 145th season in the history of Tottenham Hotspur Football Club, their 49th consecutive season in the top flight of English football, and 35th consecutive season in the Premier League. In addition to the domestic league, the club is also participating in the FA Cup and the EFL Cup.

This season is the first since 2020–21 without former captain Cristian Romero, who signed for Atlético Madrid in the summer.

== Squad information ==
No.	Player	Nationality	Position(s)	Date of birth (age)
Goalkeepers
31	Antonín Kinský	(Czech Republic)	GK	13 March 2003 (age 23)
39	Martin Dúbravka	(Slovakia)	GK	15 January 1989 (age 37)
40	Brandon Austin	(England)	GK	7 January 1999 (age 27)
Defenders
3	Andy Robertson	(Scotland)	LB	11 March 1994 (age 32)
4	Tosin Adarabioyo	(England)	CB	24 September 1997 (age 29)
5	Marcos Senesi	(Argentina)	CB	10 May 1997 (age 29)
6	Jan Paul van Hecke	(Netherlands)	CB	8 June 2000 (age 26)
13	Destiny Udogie	(Italy)	LB / LWB	28 November 2002 (age 23)
23	Pedro Porro (Vice Captain)	(Spain)	RB / RWB	13 September 1999 (age 27)
33	Ben Davies (Third Captain)	(Wales)	CB / LB	24 April 1993 (age 33)
37	Micky van de Ven (Captain)	(Netherlands)	CB / LB	19 April 2001 (age 25)
Midfielders
7	Xavi Simons	(Netherlands)	AM / LW	21 April 2003 (age 23)
8	Conor Gallagher	(England)	CM / DM / AM	6 February 2000 (age 26)
10	James Maddison (Fourth Captain)	(England)	AM / RW	23 November 1996 (age 29)
14	Archie Gray (Fifth Captain)	(England)	DM / RB / CB / LB / CM	12 March 2006 (age 20)
15	Lucas Bergvall	(Sweden)	CM / AM	2 February 2006 (age 20)
16	Sandro Tonali	(Italy)	CM / DM	8 May 2000 (age 26)
18	Mateus Fernandes	(Portugal)	CM / DM	10 July 2004 (age 22)
30	Rodrigo Bentancur	(Uruguay)	DM / CM	25 June 1997 (age 29)
Forwards
9	Richarlison	(Brazil)	ST / LW	10 April 1997 (age 29)
11	Mathys Tel	(France)	LW / RW / ST	27 April 2005 (age 21)
17	Sávio	(Brazil)	LW / RW	10 April 2004 (age 22)
19	Dominic Solanke	(England)	ST	14 September 1997 (age 29)
20	Mohammed Kudus	(Ghana)	RW / AM / ST	2 August 2000 (age 26)
21	Dejan Kulusevski	(Sweden)	AM / RW / ST	25 April 2000 (age 26)
22	Omar Marmoush	(Egypt)	ST / LW	7 February 1999 (age 27)
27	Mykhailo Mudryk	(Ukraine)	LW	5 January 2001 (age 25)
28	Wilson Odobert	(France)	LW / RW / AM	28 November 2004 (age 21)
68	Lucá Williams-Barnett	(England)	ST	1 October 2008 (age 18)
Out on loan
1	Guglielmo Vicario	(Italy)	GK	7 October 1996 (age 30)
25	Kōta Takai	(Japan)	CB	4 September 2004 (age 22)
29	Pape Matar Sarr	(Senegal)	CM / AM	14 September 2002 (age 24)
38	Souza	(Brazil)	LB / RW	16 June 2006 (age 20)
47	Mikey Moore	(England)	RW / LW	11 August 2007 (age 19)
—N/a	Kevin Danso	(Austria)	CB	19 September 1998 (age 28)
—N/a	Radu Drăgușin	(Romania)	CB	3 February 2002 (age 24)
—N/a	Yang Min-hyeok	(South Korea)	RW / LW	16 April 2006 (age 20)

Last updated: 2 July 2026.
Source: Tottenham Hotspur F.C.

== Transfers and contracts ==
=== Released / out of contract ===
Date from	Pos.	Nationality	Player	Subsequent club	Joined date	Ref.
30 June 2026	CB	(Spain)	Pele Arganese-McDermott	(England) Crawley Town	1 July 2026	
30 June 2026	CDM	(Scotland)	Matthew Craig	(England) Port Vale	1 July 2026	
30 June 2026	LW	(Hungary)	Leon Myrtaj	(Hungary) Debrecen	1 July 2026	
30 June 2026	CB	(England)	Elijah Upson	(England) Arsenal	21 July 2026	
30 June 2026	LB	(England)	Calum Logan	(England) Reading	24 August 2026	
30 June 2026	CDM	(Mali)	Yves Bissouma	(Netherlands) Ajax	16 September 2026	
30 June 2026	CDM	(England)	Leo Black	(England) Chelsea	30 September 2026	
30 June 2026	RB	(England)	Tyrell Ashcroft			
30 June 2026	CDM	(Sierra Leone)	Samal Bangura			
30 June 2026	CDM	(England)	Jamel Beggs			
30 June 2026	CDM	(Jamaica)	Danté Cassanova			

=== In ===
Date from	Pos.	Nationality	Player	From	Fee	Ref.
18 June 2026	CB	(Netherlands)	Jan Paul van Hecke	(England) Brighton & Hove Albion	£52,000,000	
1 July 2026 (Note: The transfer was announced on 24 June, and became official on 1 July once Dúbravka's contract at Burnley expired.)	GK	(Slovakia)	Martin Dúbravka	(England) Burnley	Free	
1 July 2026 (Note: The transfer was announced on 5 June, and became official on 1 July once Robertson's contract at Liverpool expired.)	LB	(Scotland)	Andy Robertson	(England) Liverpool	Free	
1 July 2026 (Note: The transfer was announced on 10 June, and became official on 1 July once Senesi's contract at Bournemouth expired.)	CB	(Argentina)	Marcos Senesi	(England) Bournemouth	Free	
2 July 2026	CM	(Portugal)	Mateus Fernandes	(England) West Ham United	£85,000,000	
6 July 2026	CDM	(Italy)	Sandro Tonali	(England) Newcastle United	£92,500,000 (Note: A potential further £7,500,000 in add-ons.)	
7 July 2026	CAM	(England)	Cole Ramsey	(England) Aston Villa	Free	
27 July 2026	CB	(Finland)	Maxwell Adedeji	(England) Leicester City	Free	
25 August 2026	RW	(Brazil)	Sávio	(England) Manchester City	£75,000,000 (Note: A potential further £10,000,000 in add-ons.)	
28 August 2026	GK	(England)	Jacob Knightbridge	(England) Oxford United	Free	
1 September 2026	CB	(England)	Tosin Adarabioyo	(England) Chelsea	£7,000,000	
3 September 2026	CDM	(Ghana)	Kwasi Senyah	(England) Wolverhampton Wanderers	Free	

Total expenditure: ▼£311.5 million

=== Out ===
Date from	Pos.	Nationality	Player	To	Fee	Ref.
1 July 2026	CF	(Argentina)	Alejo Véliz	(Brazil) Bahia	£7,800,000 (Note: A potential further £871,000 in add-ons.)	
7 July 2026	CAM	(England)	Alfie Devine	(England) Preston North End	£4,500,000 (Note: A potential further £1,500,000 in add-ons.)	
14 July 2026	CB	(Croatia)	Luka Vušković	(England) Brighton & Hove Albion	£46,000,000 (Note: A potential further £4,000,000 in add-ons.)	
20 July 2026	LW	(England)	Tynan Thompson	(England) Manchester United	£4,000,000 (Note: A potential further £4,000,000 in add-ons.)	
22 July 2026	CF	(England)	Will Lankshear	(England) Middlesbrough	£10,000,000 (Note: A potential further £10,000,000 with performance-related add-ons.)	
10 August 2026	LW	(Israel)	Manor Solomon	(England) West Ham United	£5,000,000 (Note: A potential further £2,000,000 in add-ons.)	
15 August 2026	CB	(England)	Ashley Phillips	(England) Middlesbrough	£7,000,000 (Note: A potential further £13,000,000 in add-ons.)	
15 August 2026	CB	(Argentina)	Cristian Romero	(Spain) Atlético Madrid	£34,200,000	
15 August 2026	RB	(England)	Djed Spence	(Italy) Inter Milan	£30,000,000	
1 September 2026	CF	(England)	Dane Scarlett	(England) Leyton Orient	Undisclosed	

Total income: ▲£148.5 million

=== Loaned in ===
Date from	Pos.	Nationality	Player	From	Date until	Ref.
27 August 2026	FW	(Egypt)	Omar Marmoush	(England) Manchester City	End of season	
1 September 2026	LW	(Ukraine)	Mykhailo Mudryk	(England) Chelsea	End of season	

=== Loaned out ===
Date from	Pos.	Nationality	Player	To	Loaned until	Ref.
1 July 2026	GK	(England)	Luca Gunter	(England) Boreham Wood	22 October 2026 (Note: On 22 October, Gunter was recalled from his initial season-long loan at Boreham Wood.)	
8 July 2026	CB	(Romania)	Radu Drăgușin	(Italy) Fiorentina	End of season (Note: Includes an obligation to make the move permanent if specific performance-based criteria is met.)	
11 July 2026	RW	(Morocco)	Yusuf Akhamrich	(England) Leyton Orient	End of season	
4 August 2026	GK	(England)	Blake Irow	(England) Cheshunt	1 September 2026	
4 August 2026	GK	(England)	Dylan Thompson	(England) Enfield Town	1 September 2026	
5 August 2026	CF	(Republic of Ireland)	Mason Melia	(England) Lincoln City	End of season	
7 August 2026	CM	(England)	Reiss-Alexander Russell-Denny	(England) Bristol Rovers	End of season	
12 August 2026	LW	(South Korea)	Yang Min-hyeok	(Belgium) Westerlo	End of season	
18 August 2026	GK	(Italy)	Guglielmo Vicario	(Italy) Juventus	End of season (Note: Option to make the move permanent.)	
24 August 2026	RW	(England)	Oliver Irow	(England) Plymouth Argyle	End of season	
29 August 2026	CAM	(Northern Ireland)	Jamie Donley	(England) Luton Town	End of season	
31 August 2026	RW	(England)	Mikey Moore	(Germany) 1. FC Köln	End of season	
31 August 2026	LB	(Brazil)	Souza	(Portugal) Porto	End of season	
1 September 2026	CM	(Senegal)	Pape Matar Sarr	(Italy) Juventus	End of season	
1 September 2026	CB	(Japan)	Kōta Takai	(Belgium) Sint-Truidense	End of season	
1 September 2026	CB	(Austria)	Kevin Danso	(England) Sunderland	End of season	
1 September 2026	CM	(England)	George Abbott	(England) Mansfield Town	End of season	
1 September 2026	LW	(Nigeria)	Damola Ajayi	(England) Barnet	End of season	

=== New contract ===
Date from	Pos.	Nationality	Player	Contracted until	Ref.
9 June 2026	LB	(England)	Maeson King	Undisclosed	
10 June 2026	LB	(Wales)	Ben Davies	30 June 2027	
11 June 2026	RW	(England)	Ronny Moncur	Undisclosed	
14 June 2026	RB	(Spain)	Pedro Porro	30 June 2031 (Note: Includes an option for a further year.)	
30 June 2026	CF	(Guyana)	Reiss Elliott-Parris	Undisclosed	
30 June 2026	GK	(Czech Republic)	Antonín Kinský	30 June 2032 (Note: Includes a club option for a further year.)	
1 July 2026 (Note: The contract agreement was announced on 9 June, and came into effect on 1 July.)	CF	(England)	Oliver Boast	Undisclosed (Note: First professional contract.)	
5 August 2026	RB	(Germany)	Miracle Adewole	Undisclosed	
7 August 2026	CM	(Albania)	Armend Muslika	Undisclosed	
10 August 2026	CB	(Netherlands)	Micky van de Ven	30 June 2031	
11 September 2026	CM	(Sweden)	Lucas Bergvall	Undisclosed	
17 September 2026	CB	(England)	Tyler Tingey	Undisclosed	
23 September 2026	GK	(England)	Blake Irow	Undisclosed	
27 October 2026	GK	(England)	Farren Doran	Undisclosed	
5 November 2026	RB	(England)	Oscar Sandiford	Undisclosed	
17 November 2026	CB	(England)	Solomon Olajide	Undisclosed	
20 November 2026	GK	(England)	Max Sievey	Undisclosed	

== Pre-season and friendlies ==
On 7 December 2025, the club announced they would take part in the 2026 Sydney Super Cup with matches against Sydney FC and Chelsea. In March, a pre-season tour to New Zealand was also announced with a fixture against Auckland FC. On 12 June, a behind closed doors fixture against Milton Keynes Dons was announced. On 29 June, a home fixture against TSG Hoffenheim was added to the schedule. On 5 July, a second behind closed doors fixture was added against Getafe.

Win Draw Loss Fixtures

22 July 2026 Friendly	Tottenham Hotspur	1−0	Milton Keynes Dons	Enfield
16:00 BST	Fernandes 3'	Report		Stadium: Hotspur Way Training Centre; Attendance: 0 (Behind closed doors); Referee: Constantine Hatzidakis

26 July 2026 Friendly	Auckland FC	0–2	Tottenham Hotspur	Auckland, New Zealand
15:30 NZST		Report	Scarlett 12'; Richarlison 70'	Stadium: Eden Park; Attendance: 40,112; Referee: Campbell-Kirk Kawana-Waugh (New Zealand)

29 July 2026 Sydney Super Cup	Sydney FC	1–1 (2–4 p)	Tottenham Hotspur	Sydney, Australia
19:45 AEST	A. Popović (yellow card) 37'; Sekine 55'	Report	Tel 29'	Stadium: Allianz Stadium; Attendance: 26,216; Referee: Adam Kersey
	Penalties
	G. Popovic (penalty scored); Touré (penalty scored); Lacey (penalty missed); A. Popović (penalty missed)		(penalty scored) Williams-Barnett; (penalty scored) Tonali; (penalty scored) Robertson; (penalty missed) Donley; (penalty scored) Scarlett

1 August 2026 Sydney Super Cup	Chelsea	1−2	Tottenham Hotspur	Sydney, Australia
19:45 AEST	Estêvão 21'	Report	Gallagher (yellow card) 11'; Tonali 17'; Danso (red card) 49'; Richarlison 90+2'	Stadium: Accor Stadium; Attendance: 80,363; Referee: Alex King

8 August 2026 Friendly	Tottenham Hotspur	1−1	Getafe	Enfield
15:00 BST	Gallagher 60'	Report	Ebra (yellow card) 49'; Risco 55'	Stadium: Hotspur Way Training Centre; Attendance: 0 (Behind closed doors); Referee: Nick Hopton

15 August 2026 Friendly	Tottenham Hotspur	3−0	TSG Hoffenheim	Tottenham
15:00 BST	Richarlison 35'; Moore 59', 80'	Report		Stadium: Tottenham Hotspur Stadium; Attendance: 54,345; Referee: Stuart Attwell

16 August 2026 Friendly	Tottenham Hotspur	2−2	TSG Hoffenheim	Enfield
12:00 BST	Davies 20'; Williams-Barnett 45+2'	Report	Hložek 16' (pen.); Gendrey 55'	Stadium: Hotspur Way Training Centre; Attendance: 0 (Behind closed doors); Referee: Ruebyn Ricardo

== Competitions ==
=== Overview ===
Competition	First match	Last match	Starting round	Final position	Record							
Competition	First match	Last match	Starting round	Final position	Pld	W	D	L	GF	GA	GD	Win %
Premier League	22 August 2026	30 May 2027	Matchday 1	TBD	11	4	3	4	12	11	+1	36.36
FA Cup	8–11 January 2027	TBD	Third round	TBD	0	0	0	0	0	0	+0	—
EFL Cup	26 August 2026	15 September 2026	Second round	Third round	2	1	0	1	6	4	+2	50.00
Total					13	5	3	5	18	15	+3	38.46

Last updated: 21 November 2026
Source: Tottenham Hotspur F.C.

=== Premier League ===
==== League table ====
Pos	Team	Pld	W	D	L	GF	GA	GD	Pts
7	Everton	10	4	4	2	12	10	+2	16
8	Chelsea	11	5	1	5	20	20	0	16
9	Tottenham Hotspur	11	4	3	4	12	11	+1	15
10	Brentford	10	3	5	2	16	11	+5	14
11	Aston Villa	11	3	5	3	14	17	−3	14

Updated to match(es) played on 21 November 2026. Source: Premier League
Rules for classification: 1) Points; 2) Goal difference; 3) Goals scored; 4) If the champions, relegated teams or qualified teams for UEFA competitions cannot be determined by rules 1 to 3 following the completion of the competition, rules 4.1 to 4.3 are applied between such teams – 4.1) Head-to-head points; 4.2) Head-to-head away goals; 4.3) Play-off at a neutral site.

==== Results summary ====
Overall								Home						Away					
Pld	W	D	L	GF	GA	GD	Pts	W	D	L	GF	GA	GD	W	D	L	GF	GA	GD
11	4	3	4	12	11	+1	15	3	1	2	9	6	+3	1	2	2	3	5	−2

Last updated: 21 November 2026.
Source: Soccerway

==== Results by round ====
Round	1	2	3	4	5	6	7	8	9	10	11	12	13	14	15	16	17	18	19	20	21	22	23	24	25	26	27	28	29	30	31	32	33	34	35	36	37	38
Ground	A	H	A	H	H	A	H	A	H	A	H	A	H	H	A	A	H	H	A	A	H	A	H	A	H	A	H	A	H	A	H	A	H	A	H	A	H	A
Result	L	L	D	D	L	D	W	W	W	L	W																											
Position	19	20	18	17	20	19	16	14	9	11																												
Points	0	0	1	2	2	3	6	9	12	12	15																											

Updated to match(es) played on 21 November 2026. Source: Soccerway
A = Away; H = Home; W = Win; D = Draw; L = Loss; P = Postponed

==== Matches ====
On 19 June 2026, the Premier League fixtures were released.

Win Draw Loss Fixtures

22 August 2026 1	Brentford	3–0	Tottenham Hotspur	Brentford
17:30 BST	Lewis-Potter 12'; Janelt 33', (yellow card) 78'; Kayode 49'; Thiago (penalty missed) 55'	Report	Gallagher (yellow card) 34'	Stadium: Brentford Community Stadium; Attendance: 17,180; Referee: Michael Oliver

29 August 2026 2	Tottenham Hotspur	0–2	Newcastle United	Tottenham
17:30 BST	Van de Ven (yellow card) 3'	Report	González (yellow card) 13'; Elanga 62'; Wissa 72'; Botman (yellow card) 79'	Stadium: Tottenham Hotspur Stadium; Attendance: 61,025; Referee: Peter Bankes
Note: Fixture was initially scheduled for a 15:00 kick-off, but was moved for live Sky Sports broadcast.

5 September 2026 3	Nottingham Forest	0–0	Tottenham Hotspur	West Bridgford
15:00 BST	Milenković (yellow card) 52'; McAtee (yellow card) 78'	Report	Udogie (yellow card) 45+1'; Fernandes (yellow card) 84'	Stadium: City Ground; Attendance: 30,686; Referee: Craig Pawson

12 September 2026 4	Tottenham Hotspur	0–0	Everton	Tottenham
17:30 BST		Report	Dewsbury-Hall (yellow card) 68'; Garner (yellow card) 84'	Stadium: Tottenham Hotspur Stadium; Attendance: 60,477; Referee: Darren England
Note: Fixture was initially scheduled for a 15:00 kick-off, but was moved for live Sky Sports broadcast.

19 September 2026 5	Tottenham Hotspur	2–3	Aston Villa	Tottenham
12:30 BST	Van Hecke (yellow card) 45+7', (goal) 90+8'; Gallagher 86'	Report	Manzambi 45+4'; Jackson (yellow card) 46', (goal) 67'; Buendía 79'; Cash (yellow card) 90+2'	Stadium: Tottenham Hotspur Stadium; Attendance: 60,920; Referee: Sam Barrott
Note: Fixture was initially scheduled for a 15:00 kick-off, but was moved for live TNT Sports broadcast.

10 October 2026 6	Manchester United	1–1	Tottenham Hotspur	Trafford
17:30 BST	Mbeumo 73'; Shaw (yellow card) 78'; Fernandes (yellow card) 84'; Martínez (yellow card) 87'; Dalot (yellow card) 90+6'	Report	Gallagher (yellow card) 4'; Bentancur (red card) 78'; Van Hecke (yellow card) 78'; Solanke 90+2'; Gray (yellow card) 90+8'	Stadium: Old Trafford; Attendance: 74,129; Referee: Stuart Attwell
Note: Fixture was initially scheduled for a 15:00 kick-off, but was moved for live Sky Sports broadcast.

19 October 2026 7	Tottenham Hotspur	3–1	Coventry City	Tottenham
20:00 BST	Maddison 14'; Solanke (yellow card) 22'; Marmoush 58'; Davies 90+6'	Report	Yirenkyi (yellow card) 20'; Dasilva (yellow card) 45'; Rudoni 49', (yellow card) 64'	Stadium: Tottenham Hotspur Stadium; Attendance: 60,913; Referee: Andy Madley
Note: Fixture was initially scheduled for 17 October, but was rescheduled for live Sky Sports broadcasting.

24 October 2026 8	Chelsea	0–2	Tottenham Hotspur	Fulham
17:30 BST	Palmer (yellow card) 71' (yellow-red card) 80'; Neto (yellow card) 79'; Rogers (yellow card) 90+1'	Report	Gallagher (yellow card) 67'; Van de Ven (yellow card) 71'; Fernandes (yellow card) 72'; Penders 77' (o.g.); Tel 87'	Stadium: Stamford Bridge; Attendance: 39,402; Referee: Chris Kavanagh
Note: Fixture was initially scheduled for a 15:00 kick-off, but was pushed back for live Sky Sports broadcasting.

31 October 2026 9	Tottenham Hotspur	2–0	Crystal Palace	Tottenham
17:30 GMT	Gray (yellow card) 15', (goal) 25'; Van Hecke 73'	Report	Mateta (red card) 13'; Mingueza (yellow card) 53'	Stadium: Tottenham Hotspur Stadium; Attendance: 60,549; Referee: Michael Oliver
Note: Fixture was initially scheduled for a 15:00 kick-off, but was pushed back for live Sky Sports broadcasting.

7 November 2026 10	Leeds United	1–0	Tottenham Hotspur	Leeds
12:30 GMT	Longstaff (yellow card) 22'; Okafor 79', (yellow card) 80'	Report	Van de Ven (yellow card) 15'; Porro (yellow card) 51'; Tonali (yellow card) 88'	Stadium: Elland Road; Attendance: 36,924; Referee: John Brooks
Note: Fixture was initially scheduled for a 15:00 kick-off, but was brought forward for live TNT Sports broadcasting.

21 November 2026 11	Tottenham Hotspur	2–0	Ipswich Town	Tottenham
15:00 GMT	Williams-Barnett 15', (yellow card) 52'; Maddison (yellow card) 41'; Solanke 51'; Kudus (yellow card) 79'; Fernandes (yellow card) 90+5'	Report	Diop (yellow card) 83'	Stadium: Tottenham Hotspur Stadium; Attendance: 61,533; Referee: Robert Jones

29 November 2026 12	Sunderland	v	Tottenham Hotspur	Sunderland
14:05 GMT		Report		Stadium: Stadium of Light
Note: Fixture was initially scheduled for 28 November, but was pushed back a day for live Sky Sports broadcasting.

3 December 2026 13	Tottenham Hotspur	v	Fulham	Tottenham
20:00 GMT		Report		Stadium: Tottenham Hotspur Stadium
Note: Fixture was initially scheduled for 2 December, but was pushed back a day for live Sky Sports broadcasting.

6 December 2026 14	Tottenham Hotspur	v	Arsenal	Tottenham
16:30 GMT		Report		Stadium: Tottenham Hotspur Stadium
Note: Fixture was initially scheduled for 5 December, but was pushed back a day for live Sky Sports broadcasting.

14 December 2026 15	Hull City	v	Tottenham Hotspur	Kingston upon Hull
20:00 GMT		Report		Stadium: MKM Stadium
Note: Fixture was initially scheduled for 12 December, but was pushed back two days for live Sky Sports broadcasting.

19 December 2026 16	Liverpool	v	Tottenham Hotspur	Liverpool
17:30 GMT		Report		Stadium: Anfield
Note: Fixture was initially scheduled for a 15:00 kick-off, but was pushed back for live Sky Sports broadcasting.

26 December 2026 17	Tottenham Hotspur	v	Bournemouth	Tottenham
15:00 GMT		Report		Stadium: Tottenham Hotspur Stadium

29 December 2026 18	Tottenham Hotspur	v	Brighton & Hove Albion	Tottenham
19:30 GMT		Report		Stadium: Tottenham Hotspur Stadium
Note: Fixture was initially scheduled for 30 December, but was brought forward a day for live Sky Sports broadcasting.

3 January 2027 19	Manchester City	v	Tottenham Hotspur	Manchester
16:30 GMT		Report		Stadium: Etihad Stadium
Note: Fixture was initially scheduled for 2 January, but was pushed back a day for live Sky Sports broadcasting.

6 January 2027 20	Fulham	v	Tottenham Hotspur	Fulham
19:30 GMT		Report		Stadium: Craven Cottage
Note: Fixture was initially scheduled for a 15:00 kick-off, but was brought pushed back for live Sky Sports broadcasting.

17 January 2027 21	Tottenham Hotspur	v	Leeds United	Tottenham
16:30 GMT		Report		Stadium: Tottenham Hotspur Stadium
Note: Fixture was initially scheduled for 16 January, but was pushed back a day for live Sky Sports broadcasting.

24 January 2027 22	Crystal Palace	v	Tottenham Hotspur	Selhurst
14:00 GMT		Report		Stadium: Selhurst Park
Note: Fixture was initially scheduled for 23 January, but was pushed back a day for live Sky Sports broadcasting.

31 January 2027 23	Tottenham Hotspur	v	Sunderland	Tottenham
14:00 GMT		Report		Stadium: Tottenham Hotspur Stadium
Note: Fixture was initially scheduled for 16 January, but was pushed back a day for live Sky Sports broadcasting.

6 February 2027 24	Ipswich Town	v	Tottenham Hotspur	Ipswich
15:00 GMT		Report		Stadium: Portman Road

10 February 2027 25	Tottenham Hotspur	v	Manchester City	Tottenham
15:00 GMT		Report		Stadium: Tottenham Hotspur Stadium

20 February 2027 26	Brighton & Hove Albion	v	Tottenham Hotspur	Brighton and Hove
15:00 GMT		Report		Stadium: Falmer Stadium

27 February 2027 27	Tottenham Hotspur	v	Liverpool	Tottenham
15:00 GMT		Report		Stadium: Tottenham Hotspur Stadium

3 March 2027 28	Bournemouth	v	Tottenham Hotspur	Bournemouth
15:00 GMT		Report		Stadium: Dean Court

13 March 2027 29	Tottenham Hotspur	v	Nottingham Forest	Tottenham
15:00 GMT		Report		Stadium: Tottenham Hotspur Stadium

20 March 2027 30	Everton	v	Tottenham Hotspur	Liverpool
15:00 GMT		Report		Stadium: Hill Dickinson Stadium

10 April 2027 31	Tottenham Hotspur	v	Brentford	Tottenham
15:00 BST		Report		Stadium: Tottenham Hotspur Stadium

17 April 2027 32	Newcastle United	v	Tottenham Hotspur	Newcastle upon Tyne
15:00 BST		Report		Stadium: St James' Park

24 April 2027 33	Tottenham Hotspur	v	Hull City	Tottenham
15:00 BST		Report		Stadium: Tottenham Hotspur Stadium

1 May 2027 34	Arsenal	v	Tottenham Hotspur	Holloway
15:00 BST		Report		Stadium: Emirates Stadium

8 May 2027 35	Tottenham Hotspur	v	Chelsea	Tottenham
15:00 BST		Report		Stadium: Tottenham Hotspur Stadium

15 May 2027 36	Coventry City	v	Tottenham Hotspur	Coventry
15:00 BST		Report		Stadium: Coventry Building Society Arena

23 May 2027 37	Tottenham Hotspur	v	Manchester United	Tottenham
15:00 BST		Report		Stadium: Tottenham Hotspur Stadium

30 May 2027 38	Aston Villa	v	Tottenham Hotspur	Birmingham
15:00 BST		Report		Stadium: Villa Park

=== FA Cup ===
Win Draw Loss Fixtures

=== EFL Cup ===
Spurs entered the EFL Cup in the second round, and were drawn at home to Charlton Athletic. They were then drawn away to Liverpool in the third round.

Win Draw Loss Fixtures

26 August 2026 Second round	Tottenham Hotspur	5–1	Charlton Athletic	Tottenham
19:45 BST	Bergvall (yellow card) 24'; Moore 41'; Solanke 45'; Danso 67'; Sávio 82'; Davies 85'	Report	Apter (yellow card) 45+2'; Jones 87'	Stadium: Tottenham Hotspur Stadium; Attendance: 49,008; Referee: Adam Herczeg

15 September 2026 Third round	Liverpool	3–1	Tottenham Hotspur	Liverpool
20:00 BST	Mac Allister 21'; Araújo (yellow card) 36'; Frimpong (yellow card) 40'; Gakpo 54'; Kerkez (yellow card) 75'; Szoboszlai 90+1'	Report	Marmoush (yellow card) 41'; Bentancur (yellow card) 45+3'; Gallagher 69'	Stadium: Anfield; Attendance: 60,169; Referee: Andy Madley
Note: Fixture was initially scheduled for 16 September, but was brought forward a day due to scheduling clashes.

== Statistics ==
=== Appearances ===
As of match played 21 November 2026

Players with no appearances are not included on the list; italics indicate a loaned in player

No.	Pos.	Player	Premier League		FA Cup		EFL Cup		Total	
No.	Pos.	Player	Apps	Goals	Apps	Goals	Apps	Goals	Apps	Goals
3	DF	(Scotland) Andy Robertson	8+2	0	0	0	0+1	0	8+3	0
4	DF	(England) Tosin Adarabioyo	1+1	0	0	0	1	0	2+1	0
4	DF	(Austria) Kevin Danso	0	0	0	0	0+1	1	0+1	1
5	DF	(Argentina) Marcos Senesi	3	0	0	0	1	0	4	0
6	DF	(Netherlands) Jan Paul van Hecke	11	2	0	0	1	0	12	2
8	MF	(England) Conor Gallagher	5+4	1	0	0	1	1	6+4	2
9	FW	(Brazil) Richarlison	1	0	0	0	0	0	1	0
10	MF	(England) James Maddison	3+4	1	0	0	0+1	0	3+5	1
11	FW	(France) Mathys Tel	6+2	1	0	0	2	0	8+2	1
13	DF	(Italy) Destiny Udogie	3+3	0	0	0	2	0	5+3	0
14	MF	(England) Archie Gray	8+2	1	0	0	2	0	9+2	1
15	MF	(Sweden) Lucas Bergvall	2+3	0	0	0	2	0	4+3	0
16	MF	(Italy) Sandro Tonali	10	0	0	0	0	0	10	0
17	FW	(Brazil) Sávio	4+1	0	0	0	0+2	1	4+3	1
18	MF	(Portugal) Mateus Fernandes	7+4	0	0	0	1+1	0	8+5	0
19	FW	(England) Dominic Solanke	6+5	2	0	0	1+1	1	7+6	3
20	FW	(Ghana) Mohammed Kudus	6+4	0	0	0	1	0	7+4	0
21	MF	(Sweden) Dejan Kulusevski	0+4	0	0	0	0	0	0+4	0
22	FW	(Egypt) Omar Marmoush	8+2	1	0	0	1	0	9+2	1
23	DF	(Spain) Pedro Porro	5+2	0	0	0	0+1	0	5+3	0
27	DF	(Ukraine) Mykhailo Mudryk	0+1	0	0	0	0	0	0+1	0
30	MF	(Uruguay) Rodrigo Bentancur	4+3	0	0	0	2	0	6+3	0
31	GK	(Czech Republic) Antonín Kinský	11	0	0	0	1	0	12	0
33	DF	(Wales) Ben Davies	0+2	1	0	0	1	1	1+2	2
37	DF	(Netherlands) Micky van de Ven	8+1	0	0	0	0+1	0	8+2	0
39	GK	(Slovakia) Martin Dúbravka	0	0	0	0	1	0	1	0
47	FW	(England) Mikey Moore	1+1	0	0	0	1	1	2+1	1
68	FW	(England) Lucá Williams-Barnett	1+2	1	0	0	0+1	0	1+3	1

Source: Premier League, EFL

=== Goalscorers ===
As of match played 21 November 2026

The list is sorted by squad number when total goals are equal.

Rank	Pos.	No.	Player	Premier League	FA Cup	EFL Cup	Total
1	FW	19	(England) Dominic Solanke	2	0	1	3
2	DF	6	(Netherlands) Jan Paul van Hecke	2	0	0	2
2	MF	8	(England) Conor Gallagher	1	0	1	2
2	DF	33	(Wales) Ben Davies	1	0	1	2
5	DF	4	(Austria) Kevin Danso	0	0	1	1
5	MF	10	(England) James Maddison	1	0	0	1
5	FW	11	(France) Mathys Tel	1	0	0	1
5	DF	14	(England) Archie Gray	1	0	0	1
5	FW	17	(Brazil) Sávio	0	0	1	1
5	FW	22	(Egypt) Omar Marmoush	1	0	0	1
5	FW	47	(England) Mikey Moore	0	0	1	1
5	FW	68	(England) Lucá Williams-Barnett	1	0	0	1
Totals				11	0	6	17

Source: Premier League, EFL

=== Disciplinary ===
As of match played 21 November 2026

The list is sorted by squad number when total cards are equal.

Rank	Pos.	No.	Player	Premier League			FA Cup			EFL Cup			Total		
Rank	Pos.	No.	Player	Yellow card	(yellow card) (yellow-red card)	Red card	Yellow card	(yellow card) (yellow-red card)	Red card	Yellow card	(yellow card) (yellow-red card)	Red card	Yellow card	(yellow card) (yellow-red card)	Red card
1	MF	30	(Uruguay) Rodrigo Bentancur	0	0	1	0	0	0	1	0	0	1	0	1
2	MF	8	(England) Conor Gallagher	3	0	0	0	0	0	0	0	0	3	0	0
2	MF	18	(Portugal) Mateus Fernandes	3	0	0	0	0	0	0	0	0	3	0	0
2	DF	37	(Netherlands) Micky van de Ven	3	0	0	0	0	0	0	0	0	3	0	0
5	DF	6	(Netherlands) Jan Paul van Hecke	2	0	0	0	0	0	0	0	0	2	0	0
5	DF	14	(England) Archie Gray	2	0	0	0	0	0	0	0	0	2	0	0
7	FW	9	(England) Dominic Solanke	1	0	0	0	0	0	0	0	0	1	0	0
7	MF	10	(England) James Maddison	1	0	0	0	0	0	0	0	0	1	0	0
7	DF	13	(Italy) Destiny Udogie	1	0	0	0	0	0	0	0	0	1	0	0
7	MF	15	(Sweden) Lucas Bergvall	0	0	0	0	0	0	1	0	0	1	0	0
7	MF	16	(Italy) Sandro Tonali	1	0	0	0	0	0	0	0	0	1	0	0
7	FW	20	(Ghana) Mohammed Kudus	1	0	0	0	0	0	0	0	0	1	0	0
7	FW	22	(Egypt) Omar Marmoush	0	0	0	0	0	0	1	0	0	1	0	0
7	DF	23	(Spain) Pedro Porro	1	0	0	0	0	0	0	0	0	1	0	0
7	FW	68	(England) Lucá Williams-Barnett	1	0	0	0	0	0	0	0	0	1	0	0
Totals				20	0	1	0	0	0	3	0	0	23	0	1

Source: Premier League

=== Clean sheets ===
As of match played 21 November 2026

The list is sorted by squad number when total clean sheets are equal.

Rank	No.	Player	Premier League	FA Cup	EFL Cup	Total
1	31	(Czech Republic) Antonín Kinský	5	0	0	5
Totals			5	0	0	5

Source: Premier League

== Awards ==
=== Player awards ===
==== Premier League Player of the Month ====
Month	Pos.	Player	Pld	G	A	CS	Result	Ref.
October	DF	(Netherlands) Jan Paul van Hecke	4	1	0	2	Nominated	

==== Premier League Goal of the Month ====
Month	Pos.	Player	Opposition	Result	Ref.
October	MF	(England) James Maddison	v. Coventry City	Nominated	
October	FW	(France) Mathys Tel	v. Chelsea	Nominated	

==== Premier League Creative Moment of the Month ====
Month	Pos.	Player	Opposition	Result	Ref.
October	FW	(England) Luca Williams-Barnett	v. Crystal Palace	Won	

=== Manager awards ===
==== Premier League Manager of the Month ====
Month	Manager	Pld	W	D	L	GD	Pts	Result	Ref.
October	(Italy) Roberto De Zerbi	4	3	1	0	+6	9	Won	
