= Muhammed Suso =

Gambian footballer

Personal information
- Date of birth: 15 September 2005 (age 21)
- Place of birth: Bundung, Serekunda, Gambia
- Height: 1.80 m (5 ft 11 in)
- Position: Midfielder

Team information
- Current team: Inter Turku (on loan from Pardubice)
- Number: 33

Senior career*
| Years | Team | Apps | (Gls) |
| 2023–2024 | Real de Banjul | | |
| 2024–2025 | Paide | 19 | (4) |
| 2025– | Pardubice | 0 | (0) |
| 2025– | Pardubice B | 6 | (0) |
| 2026 | → SJK (loan) | 16 | (1) |
| 2026– | → Inter Turku (loan) | 9 | (2) |
- * Club domestic league appearances and goals as of 12 November 2026 ‡ National team caps and goals as of 20:07, 28 July 2026 (UTC)

Muhammed Suso (born 15 September 2005) is a Gambian professional footballer who plays for Veikkausliiga club Inter Turku on loan from FK Pardubice.

== Club career ==
Domestically, Suso played for Real de Banjul in the GFA League First Division. He was part of the club's senior side by 2023. In 2024, he was a key contributor as the club sat at the top of the league table.

In June 2024, Suso made the jump to Europe, joining Paide Linnameeskond of Estonia's Meistriliiga. He quickly became a key member of the squad, scoring four goals in nineteen appearances during the 2024 season. During the summer 2025 transfer window, Suso joined FK Pardubice of the Czech First League from Paide on a permanent transfer. About the transfer, Paide's Sporting Director Gert Kams indicated that there had been interest in Susa from clubs throughout Europe since the beginning of the transfer window. He added that the transfer fee was the second-highest ever received by Paide, behind only the fee paid by FC St. Pauli for Abdoulie Ceesay.

In March 2026, Pardubice sent Suso on loan to SJK of Finland's Veikkausliiga. The initial loan was set to expire at the end of the 2026 season, but included a club option to purchase the player. Prior to the loan, Suso had made six appearances for the Czech club's reserve team but had not yet debuted for the first team.
