= Ryan Mahuta =

Finnish footballer (born 2002)

Personal information
- Full name: Ryan Vincent Mahuta
- Date of birth: 7 July 2002 (age 24)
- Place of birth: Turku, Finland
- Height: 1.82 m (6 ft 0 in)
- Position: Left-back

Team information
- Current team: Pardubice
- Number: 25

Youth career
- TuNL
- –2018: TPS
- 2019–2021: Inter Turku

Senior career*
Years	Team	Apps	(Gls)
2019–2022	Inter Turku II	23	(8)
2021–2022	Inter Turku	17	(0)
2023–2024	Haka	46	(2)
2025–	Pardubice	44	(2)

International career^{‡}
2025–	Finland	9	(0)
- * Club domestic league appearances and goals as of 20 September 2026 ‡ National team caps and goals as of 15 November 2026

Ryan Mahuta (born 7 July 2002) is a Finnish professional footballer who plays as a left-back for Czech First League side FK Pardubice and the Finland national team.

== Early life ==
Mahuta was born in Turku, Finland, to a South Sudanese mother and a father from the Democratic Republic of the Congo (DRC). He has dual citizenship of DRC and Finland.

== Career ==
Mahuta started playing football in Turun Nappulaliiga youth league at the age of seven, continuing in the youth sector of Turun Palloseura (TPS). After spending two seasons in Veikkausliiga with a rival club Inter Turku, Mahuta left Turku after the 2022 season.

On 20 January 2023, he signed a one-year contract with Haka, with an option to extend for 2024. After the season, Haka exercised their option and Mahuta's contract was extended until the end of 2024.

On 23 December 2024, Mahuta was announced as a new FK Pardubice player in Czech First League, starting in January 2025.

== International career ==
In March 2023, Mahuta received a call up to South Sudan national team, but declined, and announced his interest to represent either Finland or DRC.

In November 2025, he made his international debut with Finland national team.

== Career statistics ==
=== Club ===
As of 20 September 2026

Appearances and goals by club, season and competition
Club	Season	League			National cup (Note: Includes Suomen Cup and Czech Cup)		Europe		Other		Total	
Club	Season	Division	Apps	Goals	Apps	Goals	Apps	Goals	Apps	Goals	Apps	Goals
Inter Turku II	2019	Kolmonen	1	0	—		—		—		1	0
Inter Turku II	2020	Kolmonen	9	0	—		—		—		9	0
Inter Turku II	2021	Kolmonen	2	0	—		—		—		2	0
Inter Turku II	2022	Kolmonen	11	8	—		—		—		11	8
Inter Turku II	Total		23	8	0	0	0	0	0	0	23	8
Inter Turku	2021	Veikkausliiga	9	0	2	0	0	0	—		11	0
Inter Turku	2022	Veikkausliiga	8	0	0	0	0	0	3 (Note: Appearances in the Finnish League Cup)	0	11	0
Inter Turku	Total		17	0	2	0	0	0	3	0	22	0
Haka	2023	Veikkausliiga	25	2	1	0	2 (Note: Appearances in the UEFA Conference League)	0	5	1	33	3
Haka	2024	Veikkausliiga	21	0	3	0	—		4	0	28	0
Haka	Total		46	2	4	0	2	0	9	1	61	3
Pardubice	2024–25	Czech First League	13	0	1	0	–		–		14	0
Pardubice	2025–26	Czech First League	25	1	3	0	–		–		28	1
Pardubice	2026–27	Czech First League	6	1	2	3	–		–		8	4
Pardubice	Total		44	2	6	3	0	0	0	0	50	5
Pardubice B	2026–27	CHNL	1	0	–		–		–		1	0
Career total			130	12	12	3	2	0	12	1	156	15

=== International ===
As of match played 15 November 2026

National team	Year	Competitive		Friendly		Total	
National team	Year	Apps	Goals	Apps	Goals	Apps	Goals
Finland	2025	1 (Note: Appearance in the 2026 FIFA World Cup qualification.)	0	1	0	2	0
Finland	2026	3 (Note: Appearances in the 2026–27 UEFA Nations League C.)	0	4 (Note: Includes two appearances in the 2026 FIFA Series.)	0	7	0
Total		5	0	4	0	9	0

== Honours ==
Inter Turku

- Finnish League Cup runner-up: 2022

Finland

- FIFA Series: 2026
