= Jan Trousil =

Czech footballer (born 1976)

Personal information
- Date of birth: 9 April 1976 (age 50)
- Place of birth: Kutná Hora, Czechoslovakia
- Height: 1.92 m (6 ft 4 in)
- Position: Defender

Team information
- Current team: Pardubice (manager)

Youth career
- 1982–1994: Sparta Kutná Hora

Senior career*
Years	Team	Apps	(Gls)
1994–1995	Hradec Králové		
1995–1996	Znojmo		
1996–1997	Pardubice		
1997–1998	Chrudim	11	(0)
1998–2002	Slovácko	58	(4)
2002–2003	Spolana Neratovice (loan)	29	(4)
2003–2004	Kladno	29	(2)
2004–2010	Brno	158	(10)
2011	Dubnica	15	(0)
2011–2014	Slovácko	71	(5)
2014–2015	Karviná	19	(5)

Managerial career
- 2016–2023: Vyškov
- 2023–2025: Viktoria Plzeň (assistant)
- 2025–: Pardubice
- * Club domestic league appearances and goals as of 4 April 2015

Jan Trousil (born 9 April 1976) is a Czech former footballer and subsequently a football manager. He played as a defender. He was the manager of Vyškov.
