= Bartosz Pikul =

Polish footballer (born 2000)

Personal information
- Date of birth: 2 November 1997 (age 29)
- Place of birth: Tarnowskie Góry, Poland
- Height: 1.77 m (5 ft 10 in)
- Position: Midfielder

Youth career
- –2010: Gwiazda Ruda Śląska
- 2010–2014: Górnik Zabrze

Senior career*
Years	Team	Apps	(Gls)
2014–2019	Górnik Zabrze II	33	(4)
2015–2019	Górnik Zabrze	3	(0)
2017	→ Zagłębie Sosnowiec (loan)	5	(0)
2018	→ Stal Rzeszów (loan)	16	(0)
2018–2019	→ Gwarek Tarnowskie Góry (loan)	30	(0)
2019–2020	Odra Wodzisław Śląski	14	(4)
2020–2022	Opava	36	(6)
2023–2024	Pardubice	27	(1)
2024	→ Vlašim (loan)	13	(0)
2024–2025	Chojniczanka Chojnice	11	(1)
- * Club domestic league appearances and goals as of 16:04, 15 June 2025 (UTC)

Bartosz Pikul (born 2 November 1997) is a Polish professional footballer who plays as a midfielder.

== Early life ==
Pikul was born on 2 November 1997 in Tarnowskie Góry, Poland. He joined the youth academy of Polish side Górnik Zabrze at the age of thirteen.

Pikul is a native of Tarnowskie Góry, Poland. He has been nicknamed the "Jack Grealish of Pardubice" after England international Jack Grealish.

== Career ==
Pikul started his senior career with Górnik Zabrze. In 2017, he was sent on loan to Zagłębie Sosnowiec. In 2018, he joined Stal Rzeszów on loan. After that, he was sent on loan to Gwarek Tarnowskie Góry. In 2019, he moved to Odra Wodzisław Śląski. In 2020, he signed for Czech side Opava. In 2023, he signed for Czech side Pardubice. In 2024, he was sent on loan to Czech side Vlašim.

On 26 June 2024, he returned to Poland to sign with II liga club Chojniczanka Chojnice. His contract was terminated by mutual consent on 26 June 2025.

== Style of play ==
Pikul mainly operates as a midfielder. He is known for his speed.

== Honours ==
Górnik Zabrze II

- Polish Cup (Zabrze regionals): 2015–16, 2016–17
