= Dominik Mareš =

Czech footballer (born 2003)

Personal information
- Date of birth: 3 February 2003 (age 23)
- Place of birth: Czech Republic
- Position: Defender

Team information
- Current team: FK Mladá Boleslav
- Number: 24

Youth career
- Pardubice

Senior career*
Years	Team	Apps	(Gls)
2022–2024	Pardubice	47	(1)
2025–	Mladá Boleslav	10	(0)
- * Club domestic league appearances and goals as of 27 May 2026

Dominik Mareš (born 3 February 2003) is a Czech professional football defender, who can also play as a midfielder, for FK Mladá Boleslav.

== Career ==
On 10 April 2022, after graduating from Pardubice academy, Mareš made his professional debut for the club in 4–0 loss against Slavia Prague. He scored his first league goal for Pardubice in a 3–1 home loss against Brno in October 2022. Having scored one goal for Pardubice in 47 top-flight matches, Mareš signed for Mladá Boleslav in January 2025.

== Personal life ==
His father, Pavel Mareš, is a former Czech Republic international footballer.
