= Dominik Kostka =

Czech footballer (born 1996)

Personal information
- Date of birth: 4 May 1996 (age 30)
- Place of birth: Prague, Czech Republic
- Height: 1.77 m (5 ft 10 in)
- Positions: Right-back; midfielder

Team information
- Current team: MFK Ružomberok
- Number: 31

Youth career
- 2002–2007: SK Meteor Kačerov
- 2007–2015: Bohemians 1905

Senior career*
Years	Team	Apps	(Gls)
2015–2017	Bohemians 1905	2	(0)
2017–2018	Dobrovice	43	(3)
2019	Motorlet Prague		
2019	Zbuzany	12	(3)
2020	Gmünd		
2020	Slovácko B	11	(3)
2021–2023	Pardubice	78	(4)
2023–2026	Mladá Boleslav	85	(6)
2026–	Ružomberok	9	(0)
- * Club domestic league appearances and goals as of 22 September 2026

Dominik Kostka (born 4 May 1996) is a Czech professional footballer who plays as a defender for MFK Ružomberok.

== Life ==
Dominik Kostka was born in Prague.

== Club career ==
Kostka was raised in the Prague clubs SK Meteor Kačerov and Bohemians 1905. He made his Czech First League debut for Bohemians on 20 September 2015, at the age of 19, in their 0–1 home loss against Viktoria Plzeň. From 2017 to 2020, he played for several clubs (Dobrovice, Motorlet Prague, Zbuzany, Gmünd, Slovácko B), which played in lower non-professional competitions. In 2021–2023, he played for FK Pardubice in the Czech First League, where he became one of the pillars of the team. He played 78 league matches for Pardubice. After his contract expired, he transferred to Mladá Boleslav in June 2023.

After his contract in Mladá Boleslav expired in June 2026, he transferred to MFK Ružomberok.
