= Emil Tischler =

Czech footballer

Personal information
- Date of birth: 13 March 1998 (age 28)
- Place of birth: Stockerau, Austria
- Height: 1.81 m (5 ft 11 in)
- Position: Midfielder

Team information
- Current team: Dynamo České Budějovice
- Number: 14

Youth career
- 2004–2005: Langenzersdorf SV
- 2006–2008: Wiener
- 2009–2016: Austria Wien
- 2016–2018: Slovácko

Senior career*
Years	Team	Apps	(Gls)
2018–2021	Slovácko	0	(0)
2018–2019	→ Pardubice (loan)	24	(5)
2020	→ Pardubice (loan)	13	(4)
2021–2024	Pardubice	95	(6)
2024–	Dynamo České Budějovice	47	(0)

International career^{‡}
2013	Austria U15	1	(0)
2016	Czech Republic U18	5	(0)
2016–2017	Czech Republic U19	12	(0)
2019	Czech Republic U20	2	(0)
2019	Czech Republic U21	2	(0)
- * Club domestic league appearances and goals as of 28 May 2026 ‡ National team caps and goals as of 29 January 2021

Emil Tischler (born 13 March 1998) is a professional footballer who plays as a midfielder for Dynamo České Budějovice in the Czech First League.

== International career ==
Born in Austria, Tischler has represented both Austria and the Czech Republic at youth international level.

== Career statistics ==
=== Club ===
As of 24 July 2021

Appearances and goals by club, season and competition
Club	Season	League			National Cup		Continental		Other		Total	
Club	Season	Division	Apps	Goals	Apps	Goals	Apps	Goals	Apps	Goals	Apps	Goals
Slovácko	2018–19	Czech First League	0	0	0	0	–		–		0	0
Slovácko	2019–20	Czech First League	0	0	0	0	–		–		0	0
Slovácko	2020–21	Czech First League	0	0	0	0	–		–		0	0
Slovácko	Total		0	0	0	0	0	0	0	0	0	0
Pardubice (loan)	2018–19	Czech National Football League	22	5	0	0	–		0	0	22	5
Pardubice (loan)	2019–20	Czech National Football League	10	0	1	0	–		–		11	0
Pardubice (loan)	2020–21	Czech First League	30	5	0	0	–		–		30	5
Pardubice (loan)	Total		62	10	1	0	0	0	0	0	63	10
Pardubice	2021–22	Czech First League	1	2	0	0	–		–		1	2
Career total			63	12	1	0	0	0	0	0	64	12
