= Mátyás =

Mátyás (Hungarian: [ˈmaːcaːʃ]) is a Hungarian given name meaning Matthias.

Notable people with the given name Mátyás:

- Mátyás Bél, Hungarian scientist
- Mátyás Cseszneky, Hungarian magnate and cavalry commander
- Mátyás Rákosi, Hungarian communist politician, dictator of Hungary in the 1950s
- Mátyás Seiber, Hungarian-born composer who lived in England from 1935 onward
- Mátyás Szűrös, Hungarian politician, former provisional president of Hungary
- Matthias Corvinus of Hungary is called Mátyás in Hungarian

== See also ==
- Matthew (name)
