= Vojtěch Patrák =

Czech footballer (born 2000)

Personal information
- Date of birth: 18 March 2000 (age 26)
- Place of birth: Czech Republic
- Height: 1.81 m (5 ft 11 in)
- Position: Striker

Team information
- Current team: FK Pardubice
- Number: 8

Youth career
- –2013: Trutnov
- 2013–2016: Pardubice
- 2016–2019: Sparta Prague

Senior career*
Years	Team	Apps	(Gls)
2019–2023	Sparta Prague	2	(0)
2019–2022	→ Sparta Prague B	31	(10)
2021	→ Vysočina Jihlava (loan)	13	(3)
2022	→ Pardubice (loan)	12	(1)
2022–2023	→ Jablonec (loan)	18	(0)
2023–	Pardubice	78	(15)

International career
2018	Czech Republic U18	3	(0)
2021	Czech Republic U21	1	(0)
- * Club domestic league appearances and goals as of 27 May 2026

Vojtěch Patrák (born 18 March 2000) is a Czech professional footballer who plays as a striker for FK Pardubice.

== Club career ==
Patrák was raised in Vrchlabí, FKM Úpa and Trutnov. From 2016 to 2023, he was an AC Sparta Prague player, but he played mostly for Sparta's B-team and on loan at other clubs (FC Vysočina Jihlava, FK Pardubice, FK Jablonec). Patrák made his Czech First League debut for Sparta on 28 June 2020, in their 2–1 away loss against Viktoria Plzeň, but it was only one of his two league starts for the A-team.

In 2023, he transferred to Pardubice, signing a four-year deal. On 29 November 2025, in the Sparta–Pardubice match, he scored a goal and helped his team to a surprising 2–4 victory. It was his eighth goal of the 2025–26 season, making him the second best scorer in the competition in the running standings.

== International career ==
Patrák briefly played for the Czech Republic U18 and U21 national teams.
