= Leandro Lima (footballer, born 2001) =

Brazilian footballer (2001–2025)

Personal information
- Full name: Leandro Matheus Rodrigues Lima
- Date of birth: 26 December 2001
- Place of birth: São Paulo, Brazil
- Date of death: 30 March 2025 (aged 23)
- Place of death: Prostějov, Czech Republic
- Height: 1.76 m (5 ft 9 in)
- Position: Right winger

Youth career
- 2017: Ponte Preta
- 2018–2019: São Bernardo FC
- 2019: → Fluminense (loan)
- 2019–2020: Oeste
- 2020: Bahia
- 2021–2022: São Bernardo FC

Senior career*
Years	Team	Apps	(Gls)
2019	São Bernardo FC	1	(0)
2019–2020	Oeste	0	(0)
2020	Bahia	0	(0)
2021–2022	São Bernardo FC	0	(0)
2022	União Mogi	9	(7)
2022–2025	FK Pardubice	19	(1)
2023	→ Samgurali Tskaltubo (loan)	8	(0)
2024–2025	→ Prostějov (loan)	12	(2)
Total		49	(10)
- * Club domestic league appearances and goals as of 4 February 2025

Leandro Matheus Rodrigues Lima (26 December 2001 – 30 March 2025), better known as Leandro Lima, was a Brazilian professional footballer who played as right winger.

== Career ==
Having played in the youth sectors of Ponte Preta, São Bernardo FC, Oeste and Bahia, Leandro Lima began his professional career in 2019 when 17 years old, playing for São Bernardo FC in the 2019 Campeonato Paulista Série A2, returning to the youth sectors where he competed in under-20 competitions as Copa São Paulo de Futebol Jr. and Campeonato Brasileiro Sub-20. In 2022, he played in the Campeonato Paulista Segunda Divisão for União Mogi, standing out with seven goals in nine matches for the team. His good performance earned him a signing with FK Pardubice in the Czech First League.

Lima played his debut match in the Pardubice jersey on 31 July 2022, against Dynamo České Budějovice, when Pardubice suffered a 2–0 home defeat. He scored his first goal in the first team against Baník Ostrava on 28 May 2023. In the 2023–24 season, he played only one match in the first team and became more of a reserve player. He was subsequently loaned to Samgurali Sealtubo of the Georgian First Division, where he made 12 appearances in total. For the 2024–25 season, he was loaned out again, this time to 1. SK Prostějov, where he played 12 matches and scored two goals in the 2024–25 Czech National Football League.

== Personal life and death ==
Leandro Lima was also brother of the footballer Léo Jabá.

Lima died suddenly in his apartment in the city of Prostějov, Czech Republic, on 30 March 2025, at the age of 23. His death was announced on FK Pardubice's social media and later confirmed by Leo Jabá, with whom Lima had spoken a few hours earlier.
