= Matyáš Hanč =

Czech footballer (born 2004)

Personal information
- Date of birth: 27 July 2004 (age 22)
- Place of birth: Czech Republic
- Position: Defender

Team information
- Current team: Pardubice
- Number: 2

Youth career
- Pardubice

Senior career*
Years	Team	Apps	(Gls)
2022–	Pardubice	1	(0)

International career^{‡}
2021–	Czech Republic U18	4	(0)
2022-	Czech Republic U19		
- * Club domestic league appearances and goals as of 18:00, 14 April 2022 (UTC) ‡ National team caps and goals as of 18:00, 14 April 2021 (UTC)

Matyáš Hanč (born 27 July 2004) is a Czech professional footballer who plays as a defender for Pardubice.

== Club career ==
On 10 April 2022, Hanč made his debut for Pardubice, after graduating from the club's academy, in a 4–0 loss against Slavia Prague.

== International career ==
In November 2021, Hanč made his debut for Czech Republic's under-18 side in a double header against Austria.
