= Pavel Černý (footballer, born 1985) =

Czech footballer

Personal information
- Date of birth: 28 January 1985 (age 41)
- Place of birth: Hradec Králové, Czechoslovakia
- Height: 1.85 m (6 ft 1 in)
- Position: Striker

Team information
- Current team: Chrudim
- Number: 24

Senior career*
Years	Team	Apps	(Gls)
2002	Hradec Králové	15	(4)
2009	Jablonec	8	(1)
2009–2012	Hradec Králové	83	(18)
2012–2013	Akzhayik	45	(8)
2014	Ordabasy	8	(0)
2014–2017	Hradec Králové	62	(5)
2017–2025	Pardubice	205	(30)
2024–2025	→ Chrudim (loan)	22	(1)
2025–	Chrudim	0	(0)
- * Club domestic league appearances and goals as of 1 July 2025

Pavel Černý (born 28 January 1985) is a Czech football player who currently plays for Chrudim.

== Career ==
In the 2009–2010 season, while playing for Hradec Králové, he scored 14 goals and became the top goalscorer of the Czech 2. Liga together with Dani Chigou and Karel Kroupa.

On 16 August 2024, Černý joined Czech 2. Liga club Chrudim on a one-season loan deal.
