= Tomáš Solil =

Czech footballer

Personal information
- Full name: Tomáš Solil
- Date of birth: 1 February 2000 (age 26)
- Place of birth: Czech Republic
- Position: Midfielder

Team information
- Current team: Pardubice
- Number: 24

Youth career
- –2018: Pardubice

Senior career*
Years	Team	Apps	(Gls)
2018–	Pardubice	140	(12)

International career^{‡}
2016–2017	Czech Republic U17	7	(1)
2017	Czech Republic U18	2	(0)
2019	Czech Republic U19	5	(1)
2019	Czech Republic U20	2	(0)
- * Club domestic league appearances and goals as of 27 May 2026 ‡ National team caps and goals as of 19:52, 6 September 2020 (UTC)

Tomáš Solil (born 1 February 2000) is a Czech footballer who plays as a midfielder for Pardubice.

== Club career ==
Solil made his professional debut for Pardubice in the Czech National Football League on 6 May 2018, starting in the home match against Třinec, which finished as a 1–0 win.

== International career ==
In September 2020, Solil received his first call-up to the Czech Republic national team for their UEFA Nations League match against Scotland on 7 September. Due to positive SARS-CoV-2 tests in the previous Czech Republic squad, all players and the coaching staff which faced Slovakia on 4 September had to be replaced.
