= FK Pardubice =

Czech football club

- Full name: Fotbalový klub Pardubice a.s.
- Founded: 2008; 18 years ago
- Ground: CFIG Arena, Pardubice
- Capacity: 4,620
- Chairman: Vít Zavřel
- Manager: Jan Trousil
- League: Czech First League
- 2025–26: 9th of 16
- Website: www.fkpardubice.cz
Home colours	Away colours	Third colours

FK Pardubice is a Czech football club located in the city of Pardubice. Since 2020, the club has played in the Czech First League.

The club is the successor of TJ Tesla Pardubice, which merged with FC Loko Pardubice in 2008.

== History ==
Club logo until 2026

The club advanced to the Bohemian Football League in 2010 from the Czech Fourth Division. In 2012 the club was again promoted, this time to the Czech 2. Liga, after finishing second in the 2011–12 Bohemian Football League. Winners MFK Chrudim were not promoted due to their stadium not meeting league requirements.

== Players ==
=== Current squad ===
As of 29 September 2026.

Note: Flags indicate national team as defined under FIFA eligibility rules; some limited exceptions apply. Players may hold more than one non-FIFA nationality.

No.	Pos.	Nation	Player
1	GK	CZE	Jáchym Šerák
6	DF	CZE	Marek Icha
9	FW	CZE	Daniel Smékal
10	FW	CZE	Vojtěch Patrák
11	MF	CZE	Jiří Zima
12	DF	CZE	Jan Trédl
13	GK	CZE	Jan Stejskal
15	DF	NGR	Emmanuel Godwin
16	MF	CZE	Tomáš Jelínek (on loan from Slavia Prague)
17	FW	CZE	Václav Drchal
19	MF	CZE	Michal Hlavatý
20	FW	NGR	Abdullahi Tanko
21	DF	CIV	Mouhamed Traore
23	GK	GEO	Luka Kharatishvili

No.	Pos.	Nation	Player
24	MF	CZE	Tomáš Solil
25	DF	FIN	Ryan Mahuta
26	MF	CZE	Samuel Šimek
30	GK	CZE	Aleš Mandous
33	DF	CZE	Denis Halinský (on loan from Slavia Prague)
35	FW	NGR	Victor Samuel
37	DF	SVK	Dávid Krčík
40	DF	CZE	Tobias Boledovič
43	DF	NED	Jason Noslin
44	DF	BEL	Simon Bammens
46	GK	CZE	Vladimír Neuman (on loan from Karviná)
77	MF	EST	Robi Saarma
90	MF	GRE	Giannis Fivos Botos
99	FW	BRA	Kahuan Vinicius

=== Out on loan ===
Note: Flags indicate national team as defined under FIFA eligibility rules; some limited exceptions apply. Players may hold more than one non-FIFA nationality.

No.	Pos.	Nation	Player
—	DF	UKR	Bohdan Slyubyk (at LNZ Cherkasy)
—	FW	GAM	Muhammed Suso (at Inter Turku)
—	FW	CZE	Filip Vecheta (at Jablonec)
—	DF	CZE	Jiří Hamza (at Karviná)
—	MF	CZE	Štěpán Míšek (at Karviná)

No.	Pos.	Nation	Player
—	MF	CZE	Ondřej Vencl (at Arsenal Česká Lípa)
—	DF	CZE	Michal Surzyn (at Prostějov)
—	MF	CZE	Marek Halda (at Prostějov)
—	FW	PHI	André Leipold (at Verl)

== Managers ==
- Martin Svědík (2007–2013)
- Jiří Krejčí (2013–2014)
- Martin Hašek (2014)
- Jiří Krejčí (2014–2022)
- Pavel Němeček (2022)
- Radoslav Kováč (2022–2024)
- Jiří Saňák (2024)
- David Střihavka (2024–2025)
- Jiří Krejčí (2025)
- Jan Trousil (2025–present)

== History in domestic competitions ==
- 2008–2010 Divize C
- 2010–2012 Bohemian Football League
- 2012–2020 Czech 2. Liga
- 2020– Czech First League

- Seasons spent at Level 1 of the football league system: 6
- Seasons spent at Level 2 of the football league system: 8
- Seasons spent at Level 3 of the football league system: 2
- Seasons spent at Level 4 of the football league system: 2

=== Czech Republic ===
Season	League	Placed	Pld	W	D	L	GF	GA	GD	Pts	Cup
2010–11	3. liga	3rd	34	18	7	9	61	27	+34	61	Round of 64
2011–12	3. liga	2nd	34	21	5	8	81	32	+49	68	Round of 32
2012–13	2. liga	7th	30	14	4	12	47	31	+16	46	Round of 32
2013–14	2. liga	11th	30	10	7	13	32	32	0	37	Round of 32
2014–15	2. liga	8th	30	12	9	9	37	34	+3	45	Round of 32
2015–16	2. liga	6th	28	10	8	10	29	29	0	38	Round of 16
2016–17	2. liga	7th	30	10	9	11	31	33	–2	39	Round of 32
2017–18	2. liga	3rd	30	16	3	11	44	30	+14	51	Round of 64
2018–19	2. liga	7th	30	11	11	8	45	34	+11	44	Round of 32
2019–20	2. liga	1st	30	22	4	4	55	19	+36	70	Round of 64
2020–21	1. liga	7th	34	15	7	12	41	42	–1	52	First round
2021–22	1. liga	11th	35	9	10	16	42	68	–26	37	Round of 32
2022–23	1. liga	14th	35	11	4	20	38	63	–25	37	Round of 64
2023–24	1. liga	12th	35	11	7	17	39	47	–8	40	Round of 32
2024–25	1. liga	15th	35	6	7	22	25	56	–31	25	Round of 16
2025–26	1. liga	9th	32	12	8	12	42	50	–8	44	Round of 16
