= 2023–24 SK Dynamo České Budějovice season =

SK Dynamo České Budějovice
2023–24 season
- Manager: Marek Nikl (until 23 November); Tomáš Zápotočný (23 November–14 December); Jiří Lerch (from 14 December)
- Stadium: Stadion Střelecký ostrov
- Czech First League: 16th
- Czech Cup: Fourth round
- Top goalscorer: League: Jan Suchan (7); All: Jan Suchan (7)
- Average home league attendance: 3,153
- All statistics correct as of August 2023.

The 2023–24 season is SK Dynamo České Budějovice's 124th season in existence and fifth consecutive in the Czech First League. They also competed in the Czech Cup.

== Players ==
=== First-team squad ===
As of 21 September 2023

Note: Flags indicate national team as defined under FIFA eligibility rules; some limited exceptions apply. Players may hold more than one non-FIFA nationality.

No.	Pos.	Nation	Player
1	GK	SVK	Dávid Šípoš
2	DF	CZE	Lukáš Havel
3	DF	SVK	Martin Králik
4	DF	CZE	David Broukal
5	DF	CZE	Jakub Pařízek
6	DF	DOM	Thomas Jungbauer
7	FW	NGR	Quadri Adediran
9	MF	CZE	Jiří Skalák
10	MF	CZE	Jan Suchan
11	MF	CZE	Vojtěch Hora
12	MF	CZE	Pavel Osmančík
13	FW	CZE	Zdeněk Ondrášek
14	MF	CZE	Samuel Šigut

No.	Pos.	Nation	Player
15	DF	CZE	Ondřej Čoudek
16	MF	CZE	Marcel Čermák
17	FW	CZE	Tomáš Zajíc
18	MF	CZE	Patrik Hellebrand
19	MF	NGR	Wale Musa Alli (on loan from Zbrojovka Brno)
20	MF	CZE	Michal Hubínek
22	DF	CZE	Martin Sladký
25	MF	CZE	Matouš Nikl
27	DF	AUT	Vincent Trummer
29	GK	CZE	Colin Andrew
30	GK	CZE	Martin Janáček
—	MF	CZE	Libor Bastl
—	MF	BIH	Alen Dejanovič

=== Out on loan ===
Note: Flags indicate national team as defined under FIFA eligibility rules; some limited exceptions apply. Players may hold more than one non-FIFA nationality.

No.	Pos.	Nation	Player
—	GK	CZE	Matěj Luksch (at Skalica)
—	DF	CZE	Jan Brabec (at Příbram)
—	MF	CZE	David Krch (at Příbram)

No.	Pos.	Nation	Player
—	MF	CZE	Roman Potočný (at Zbrojovka Brno)
—	FW	CZE	Jakub Matoušek (at Táborsko)
—	FW	CZE	Jakub Švec (at Zlaté Moravce)

== Transfers ==
=== In ===
Pos.	Player	Transferred from	Fee	Date	Source

=== Out ===
Pos.	Player	Transferred to	Fee	Date	Source

== Pre-season and friendlies ==
Win Draw Loss Fixtures

24 June 2023 Friendly	SK Strakonice (Czech Republic)	1–11	(Czech Republic) Dynamo České Budějovice
16:45

28 June 2023 Friendly	Dynamo České Budějovice (Czech Republic)	1–2	(Czech Republic) Sellier & Bellot Vlašim
16:30

1 July 2023 Friendly	Dynamo České Budějovice (Czech Republic)	3–3	(Czech Republic) Táborsko
10:30

12 July 2023 Friendly	Dynamo České Budějovice (Czech Republic)	1–2	(Hungary) Diósgyőri VTK
11:00

15 July 2023 Friendly	Dynamo České Budějovice (Czech Republic)	1–2	(Hungary) Újpest
17:00

6 September 2023 Friendly	LASK (Austria)	5–4	(Czech Republic) Dynamo České Budějovice	Pasching, Austria
11:00				Stadium: voestalpine Stadium

== Competitions ==
=== Overall record ===
Competition	First match	Last match	Starting round	Final position	Record							
Competition	First match	Last match	Starting round	Final position	Pld	W	D	L	GF	GA	GD	Win %
Czech First League	23 July 2023	28 April 2024	Matchday 1	16th	30	6	6	18	34	62	−28	20.00
Relegation group	4 May 2024	25 May 2024	Matchday 1		1	1	0	0	2	1	+1	100.00
Czech Cup	10 October 2023	16 November 2023	Second round	Fourth round	3	2	0	1	6	3	+3	66.67
Total					34	9	6	19	42	66	−24	26.47

Last updated: 28 April 2024
Source: Soccerway

=== Czech First League ===
==== Results summary ====
Overall								Home						Away					
Pld	W	D	L	GF	GA	GD	Pts	W	D	L	GF	GA	GD	W	D	L	GF	GA	GD
35	7	8	20	41	70	−29	29	7	3	7	26	26	0	0	5	13	15	44	−29

Source: Fortuna Liga

==== Regular season ====
===== League table =====
Pos	Team	Pld	W	D	L	GF	GA	GD	Pts	Qualification or relegation
12	Jablonec	30	6	12	12	35	45	−10	30	Qualification for the Relegation group
13	Pardubice	30	7	7	16	29	42	−13	28	Qualification for the Relegation group
14	Karviná	30	6	7	17	30	52	−22	25	Qualification for the Relegation group
15	Zlín	30	5	10	15	36	61	−25	25	Qualification for the Relegation group
16	České Budějovice	30	6	6	18	34	62	−28	24	Qualification for the Relegation group

Source: Fortuna Liga
Rules for classification: 1) Points; 2) Head-to-head points; 3) Head-to-head goal difference; 4) Head-to-head goals scored; 5) Goal difference; 6) Goals scored; 7) Fair-play ranking; 8) Draw.

===== Results by round =====
Round	1	2	3	4	5	6	7	8	9	10	11	12	13	14	15	16	17	18	19	20	21	22	23	24	25	26	27	28	29	30
Ground	A	H	A	H	H	A	H	A	H	A	H	A	H	A	H	A	H	A	A	H	A	H	A	H	A	H	A	H	A	H
Result	L	L	L	L	W	L	W	L	L	D	W	L	L	L	L	L	L	L	D	W	L	W	L	D	L	L	D	W	D	D
Position	15	16	16	16	15	16	13	13	13	15	12	14	15	15	16	16	16	16	16	16	16	15	15	15	16	16	16	15	15	16

Source: Fortuna Liga
A = Away; H = Home; W = Win; D = Draw; L = Loss

===== Matches =====
The league fixtures were unveiled on 21 June 2023.

23 July 2023 1	Slovácko	4–1	České Budějovice	Uherské Hradiště
15:00 CEST (UTC+2)	Havlík 36'; Kim 39'; Valenta 76'; Mihálik 81'	Report	Hora 54' (pen.)	Stadium: Městský fotbalový stadion Miroslava Valenty; Attendance: 4,324; Referee: Dominik Starý

30 July 2023 2	České Budějovice	1–3	Slavia Prague	České Budějovice
15:00 CEST (UTC+2)	Ondrášek 53'	Report	Zafeiris 13'; Provod 74'; Chytil 84'	Stadium: Stadion Střelecký ostrov Attendance: 6,681; Referee: Ladislav Szikszay

5 August 2023 3	Hradec Králové	5–1	České Budějovice	Hradec Králové
18:00 CEST (UTC+2)	Vašulín 19'; Horák 21'; Krejčí 31'; Kučera 49'; Pilař 54' (pen.)	Report	Hora 48'	Stadium: Malšovická aréna Attendance: 9,058; Referee: Dalibor Černý

13 August 2023 4	České Budějovice	2–5	Viktoria Plzeň	České Budějovice
18:00 CEST (UTC+2)	Hora 45+3' (pen.); Osmančík 74'	Report	Traoré 8'; Šulc 10', 72', 90+2' (pen.); Bucha 46'	Stadium: Stadion Střelecký ostrov Attendance: 4,723; Referee: Stanislav Volek

20 August 2023 5	České Budějovice	3–0	Bohemians 1905	České Budějovice
15:00 CEST (UTC+2)	Adediran 45+2'; Havel 58'; Osmančík 89'	Report		Stadium: Stadion Střelecký ostrov Attendance: 3,756; Referee: Jan Petřík

26 August 2023 6	Baník Ostrava	2–0	České Budějovice	Ostrava
18:00 CEST (UTC+2)	Tanko 64', 73'	Report		Stadium: Městský stadion Attendance: 6,458; Referee: Ondřej Pechanec

2 September 2023 7	České Budějovice	2–1	Jablonec	České Budějovice
15:00 CEST (UTC+2)	Hora 20' (pen.), (yellow card) 90+4'; Ondrášek (yellow card) 28' (yellow-red card) 50'; Alli 56'	Report	Kratochvíl 6'; Tekijaški (yellow card) 65'; Černák (yellow card) 90+3'	Stadium: Stadion Střelecký ostrov Attendance: 2,736; Referee: Filip Kotala

16 September 2023 8	Sigma Olomouc	2–1	České Budějovice	Olomouc
15:00 CEST (UTC+2)	Juliš 33'; Navrátil 42'	Report	Skalák 20'	Stadium: Andrův stadion Attendance: 3 432; Referee: Stanislav Volek

23 September 2023 9	České Budějovice	1–2	Mladá Boleslav	České Budějovice
15:00 CEST (UTC+2)	Ondrášek 75'	Report	Kostka 8'; Suchomel 83'	Stadium: Stadion Střelecký ostrov Attendance: 2,698; Referee: Karel Rouček

30 September 2023 10	Zlín	1–1	České Budějovice	Zlín
15:00 CEST (UTC+2)	Slončík 85'	Report	Šigut 45+1'	Stadium: Letná Stadion; Attendance: 2,267; Referee: Jan Všetečka

7 October 2023 11	České Budějovice	1–0	Karviná	České Budějovice
15:00 CEST (UTC+2)	Alli 87'	Report		Stadium: Stadion Střelecký ostrov Attendance: 2,249; Referee: Michael Kvítek

22 October 2023 12	Sparta Prague	4–0	České Budějovice	Prague
15:00 CEST (UTC+2)	Kairinen 17', (yellow card) 40'; Pešek 45'; Sørensen 46'; Panák (yellow card) 69'; Ševčík 76'	Report		Stadium: epet ARENA; Attendance: 16,537; Referee: Ondřej Berka

28 October 2023 13	České Budějovice	0–1	Pardubice	České Budějovice
15:00 CEST (UTC+2)		Report	Zlatohlávek 9'	Stadium: Stadion Střelecký ostrov Attendance: 2,238; Referee: Jan Petřík

5 November 2023 14	Slovan Liberec	1–0	České Budějovice	Liberec
15:00 CET (UTC+1)	Pourzitidis (yellow card) 7'; Kulenović 59'; Višinský (yellow card) 71'	Report	Suchan (yellow card) 10'; Nikl (yellow card) 30'	Stadium: Stadion u Nisy; Attendance: 1,827; Referee: Jan Machálek

11 November 2023 15	České Budějovice	0–1	Teplice	České Budějovice
15:00 CET (UTC+1)		Report	Vachoušek 6'	Stadium: Stadion Střelecký ostrov Attendance: 1,937; Referee: Vít Zaoral

25 November 2023 16	Slavia Prague	2–1	České Budějovice	Prague
18:00 CET (UTC+1)	Jurečka 7'; Chytil 72'	Report	Adediran 20'	Stadium: Fortuna Arena; Attendance: 16,620; Referee: Michael Kvítek

10 December 2023 18	Viktoria Plzeň	5–0	České Budějovice	Plzeň
15:00 CET (UTC+1)	Jirka 18' (pen.); Kliment 22'; Hranáč 55'; Mosquera 85'; Bucha 90+4'	Report		Stadium: Doosan Arena; Attendance: 5,231; Referee: Jan Petřík

13 December 2023 17	České Budějovice	0–2	Hradec Králové	České Budějovice
17:00 CET (UTC+1)		Report	Čmelík 4'; Kučera 45+1'	Stadium: Stadion Střelecký ostrov Attendance: 783; Referee: Karel Rouček

16 December 2023 19	Bohemians 1905	0–0	České Budějovice	Prague
18:00 CET (UTC+1)		Report		Stadium: Ďolíček; Attendance: 3,712; Referee: Petr Hocek

10 February 2024 20	České Budějovice	3–0	Baník Ostrava	České Budějovice
15:00 CET (UTC+1)	Šigut 56'; Králik 66'; Alli 69'	Report		Stadium: Stadion Střelecký ostrov Attendance: 2,457; Referee: Ondřej Pechanec

17 February 2024 21	Jablonec	5–2	České Budějovice	Jablonec nad Nisou
15:00 CET (UTC+1)	Chanturishvili 8'; Látal (coach) (yellow card) 38'; Martinec 47'; Tekijaški 58'; Nebyla 72'; Drchal 90+2'; Houska (yellow card) 90+3'	Report	Hellebrand 18'; Suchan 62'	Stadium: Stadion Střelnice; Attendance: 1,443; Referee: Jan Machálek

25 February 2024 22	České Budějovice	2–1	Sigma Olomouc	České Budějovice
15:00 CET (UTC+1)	Králik 52'; Ondrášek 63'	Report	Novák 85'	Stadium: Stadion Střelecký ostrov Attendance: 2,398; Referee: Filip Kotala

2 March 2024 23	Mladá Boleslav	3–1	České Budějovice	Mladá Boleslav
15:00 CET (UTC+1)	Helal 10', 15'; Nikl 90+1' (o.g.)	Report	Zíka 7'	Stadium: Lokotrans Aréna; Attendance: 2,021; Referee: Tomáš Batík

10 March 2024 24	České Budějovice	2–2	Zlín	České Budějovice
15:00 CET (UTC+1)	Suchan 2', 75'	Report	Černín 7'; Janetzký 90'	Stadium: Stadion Střelecký ostrov Attendance: 2,412; Referee: Ondřej Pechanec

16 March 2024 25	Karviná	2–1	České Budějovice	Karviná
15:00 CET (UTC+1)	Memić 30'; Iván 90+3' (pen.)	Report	Suchan 20'	Stadium: Městský stadion Attendance: 1,862; Referee: Jan Všetečka

31 March 2024 26	České Budějovice	0–1	Sparta Prague	České Budějovice
18:00 CEST (UTC+2)		Report	Birmančević 17'	Stadium: Stadion Střelecký ostrov Attendance: 6,681; Referee: Jan Machálek

7 April 2024 27	Pardubice	1–1	České Budějovice	Pardubice
15:00 CEST (UTC+2)	Surzyn 5'	Report	Ondrášek 80'	Stadium: CFIG Arena; Attendance: 3,131; Referee: Marek Radina

13 April 2024 28	České Budějovice	3–2	Slovan Liberec	České Budějovice
15:00 CEST (UTC+2)	Hellebrand 45', (yellow card) 75'; Ondrášek 67', (yellow card) 71'; Čermák (yellow card) 78'; Suchan 90+6'; Šigut (yellow card) 90+8'	Report	Žambůrek 6', (yellow card) 47'; Mikula (yellow card) 23'; Kulenović (yellow card) 54'; Ghali (yellow card) 87'; Poulolo 90+3' (o.g.)	Stadium: Stadion Střelecký ostrov Attendance: 2,398; Referee: Vít Zaoral

20 April 2024 29	Teplice	2–2	České Budějovice	Teplice
18:00 CEST (UTC+2)	Fila 33'; Chaloupek 40'	Report	Mareček 25' (o.g.); Suchan 67' (pen.)	Stadium: Na Stínadlech; Attendance: 3,107; Referee: Jan Petřík

28 April 2024 30	České Budějovice	2–2	Slovácko	České Budějovice
15:00 CEST (UTC+2)	Suchan 45+1'; Tranziska 55'	Report	Kim 22'; Mihálik 83'	Stadium: Stadion Střelecký ostrov Attendance: 3,154; Referee: Marek Radina

==== Championship group ====
Pos	Team	Pld	W	D	L	GF	GA	GD	Pts	Qualification or relegation	JAB	PCE	BOH	KAR	CBU	ZLN
11	Jablonec	35	9	14	12	45	50	−5	41		—	3–0	—	3–2	—	1–0
12	Pardubice	35	11	7	17	39	47	−8	40		—	—	—	4–0	3–2	2–0
13	Bohemians 1905	35	9	12	14	34	48	−14	39		1–1	0–1	—	1–3	—	—
14	Karviná (O)	35	8	8	19	38	62	−24	32	Qualification for the relegation play-offs	—	—	—	—	1–0	2–2
15	České Budějovice (O)	35	7	8	20	41	70	−29	29	Qualification for the relegation play-offs	2–2	—	2–1	—	—	—
16	Zlín (R)	35	5	12	18	40	69	−29	27	Relegation to FNL	—	—	1–2	—	1–1	—

Source: Fortuna Liga
Legend: Blue = home team win; Yellow = draw; Red = away team win.
Rules for classification: 1) Total points; 2) Points earned in regular season; 3) Head-to-head points (regular season); 4) Head-to-head goal difference (regular season); 5) Head-to-head goals scored (regular season); 5) Goal difference (all matches); 6) Goals scored (all matches); 7) Fair-play ranking; 8) Draw.
(O) Play-off winners; (R) Relegated

===== Results by round =====
Round	1	2	3	4	5
Ground	H	A	A	H	A
Result	W	L	D	D	L
Position	14	14	15	15	15

Source: Fortuna Liga
A = Away; H = Home; W = Win; D = Draw; L = Loss

===== Matches =====
4 May 2024 31	České Budějovice	2–1	Bohemians 1905	České Budějovice
15:00 CEST (UTC+2)	Trummer 26', 90+5'	Report	Kovařík 38' (pen.)	Stadium: Stadion Střelecký ostrov Attendance: 4,286; Referee: Ondřej Berka

12 May 2024 32	Pardubice	3–2	České Budějovice	Pardubice
15:00 CEST (UTC+2)	Hlavatý 45+1', 85'; Poulolo 69' (o.g.)	Report	Alli 31'; Čermák 73'	Stadium: CFIG Arena; Attendance: 2,853; Referee: Karel Rouček

16 May 2024 33	Zlín	1–1	České Budějovice	Zlín
17:00 CEST (UTC+2)	Žák 62'	Report	Tranziska 52'	Stadium: Letná Stadion; Attendance: 3,428; Referee: Marek Radina

19 May 2024 34	České Budějovice	2–2	Jablonec	České Budějovice
17:00 CEST (UTC+2)	Ondrášek 33'; Tranziska 36'; Havel (yellow card) 88'; Suchan (yellow card) 90+5'	Report	Kratochvíl (yellow card) 23', (goal) 43'; Látal (coach) (yellow card) 38'; Náprstek 38'; Štěpánek (yellow card) 67'	Stadium: Stadion Střelecký ostrov Attendance: 5,101; Referee: Dominik Starý

25 May 2024 35	Karviná	1–0	České Budějovice	Karviná
18:00 CEST (UTC+2)	Budínský 30'; Boháč (yellow card) 90+2'	Report		Stadium: Městský stadion Attendance: 2,056; Referee: Ondřej Pechanec
