= 2022–23 SK Dynamo České Budějovice season =

SK Dynamo České Budějovice
2022–23 season
- Chairman: Martin Vozábal
- Manager: Marek Nikl
- Stadium: Stadion Střelecký ostrov
- Czech First League: 13th
- Czech Cup: Fourth round

The 2022–23 season is the 118th in the history of SK Dynamo České Budějovice and their fourth consecutive season in the top flight. The club will participate in the Czech First League and the Czech Cup.

== Players ==
As of 3 August 2022

Note: Flags indicate national team as defined under FIFA eligibility rules; some limited exceptions apply. Players may hold more than one non-FIFA nationality.

No.	Pos.	Nation	Player
1	GK	SVK	Dávid Šípoš
2	DF	CZE	Lukáš Havel
3	DF	SVK	Martin Králik
4	DF	CZE	David Broukal
7	MF	SVK	Jakub Švec
9	FW	CZE	Jakub Matoušek
10	FW	CZE	Michal Škoda
11	MF	CZE	Patrik Čavoš
12	DF	BIH	Benjamin Čolić
13	MF	CZE	Roman Potočný
14	FW	CZE	Daniel Hais
15	DF	CZE	Ondřej Čoudek
16	MF	CZE	Jonáš Vais

No.	Pos.	Nation	Player
17	FW	CZE	Tomáš Zajíc
18	MF	CZE	Patrik Hellebrand
19	MF	CZE	Nicolas Penner
20	MF	CZE	David Krch
21	MF	SVK	Lukáš Čmelík (on loan from Karviná)
22	DF	CZE	Martin Sladký
25	DF	SVK	Lukáš Skovajsa
27	MF	CRO	Matej Mršić
30	GK	CZE	Martin Janáček
33	GK	CZE	Matěj Luksch
38	MF	SVK	Jakub Grič
—	DF	SVK	Branislav Sluka (on loan from Žilina)

=== Out on loan ===
Note: Flags indicate national team as defined under FIFA eligibility rules; some limited exceptions apply. Players may hold more than one non-FIFA nationality.

No.	Pos.	Nation	Player
—	GK	CZE	Daniel Kerl (at Fotbal Třinec)

== Pre-season and friendlies ==
Win Draw Loss Fixtures

2 July 2022 Friendly	České Budějovice (Czech Republic)	3–1	(Czech Republic) Dukla Praha
CEST (UTC+2)

9 July 2022 Friendly	České Budějovice (Czech Republic)	6–3	(Czech Republic) Vlašim
CEST (UTC+2)

13 July 2022 Friendly	FC Augsburg (Germany)	0–1	(Czech Republic) České Budějovice	Kössen, Austria
18:00 CEST (UTC+2)		Report	Vais 80'	Stadium: Kaiserwinkl Arena

15 July 2022 Friendly	Union Berlin (Germany)	1–0	(Czech Republic) České Budějovice	Neukirchen am Großvenediger, Germany
14:30 CEST (UTC+2)	Seguin 37'			Stadium: Sportplatz Neukirchen am Großvenediger; Attendance: 500

18 July 2022 Friendly	České Budějovice (Czech Republic)	2–1	(Poland) Wieczysta Kraków
CEST (UTC+2)

24 July 2022 Friendly	České Budějovice (Czech Republic)	4–0	(Czech Republic) Táborsko
CEST (UTC+2)

26 November 2022 Friendly	St. Pölten (Austria)	7–1	(Czech Republic) České Budějovice
CET (UTC+1)

2 December 2022 Friendly	Ried (Austria)	3–3	(Czech Republic) České Budějovice
CET (UTC+1)

== Competitions ==
=== Overall record ===
Competition	First match	Last match	Starting round	Record							
Competition	First match	Last match	Starting round	Pld	W	D	L	GF	GA	GD	Win %
Czech First League	30 July 2022	May 2023	Matchday 1	16	5	3	8	17	30	−13	31.25
Czech Cup	21 September 2022		Second round	2	2	0	0	8	1	+7	100.00
Total				18	7	3	8	25	31	−6	38.89

Last updated: 12 November 2022
Source: Soccerway

=== Czech First League ===
==== Results summary ====
Overall								Home						Away					
Pld	W	D	L	GF	GA	GD	Pts	W	D	L	GF	GA	GD	W	D	L	GF	GA	GD
30	10	5	15	35	54	−19	35	6	2	7	19	25	−6	4	3	8	16	29	−13

Source: Fortuna Liga

==== Regular season ====
===== League table =====
Pos	Team	Pld	W	D	L	GF	GA	GD	Pts	Qualification or relegation
8	Hradec Králové	30	11	5	14	34	40	−6	38	Qualification for the play-off
9	Mladá Boleslav	30	9	10	11	39	42	−3	37	Qualification for the play-off
10	České Budějovice	30	10	5	15	35	54	−19	35	Qualification for the play-off
11	Jablonec	30	9	8	13	46	57	−11	35	Qualification for the relegation group
12	Baník Ostrava	30	9	8	13	43	42	+1	35	Qualification for the relegation group

Source: Fortuna Liga
Rules for classification: 1) Points; 2) Head-to-head points; 3) Head-to-head goal difference; 4) Head-to-head goals scored; 5) Goal difference; 6) Goals scored; 7) Fair-play ranking; 8) Draw.

===== Results by round =====
Round	1	2	3	4	5	6	7	8	9	10	11	12	13	14	15	16	17	18	19	20	21	22	23	24	25	26	27	28	29	30
Ground	A	H	H	A	H	A	H	A	H	A	H	A	H	A	H	A	A	H	A	H	A	H	A	H	A	H	A	H	A	H
Result	W	L	D	D	L	W	L	L	L	W	D	W	L	L	W	L	L	L	L	W	D	W	L	W	L	L	L	W	D	W
Position	3	9	8	9	10	8	10	12	15	13	13	8	11	14	11	13	13	13	14	12	13	13	13	10	11	12	13	12	12	10

Source: Fortuna Liga
A = Away; H = Home; W = Win; D = Draw; L = Loss

===== Matches =====
The league fixtures were announced on 22 June 2022.

31 July 2022 1	Pardubice	0–2	České Budějovice	Prague (Note: Pardubice played the first half of the season in Ďolíček due to the rebuilding of their stadium Pod Vinicí.)
16:00 CEST (UTC+2)		Report	Hellebrand 8'; Králik 67'	Stadium: Ďolíček; Attendance: 926; Referee: Tomáš Klíma

7 August 2022 2	České Budějovice	0–2	Sparta Prague	České Budějovice
16:00 CEST (UTC+2)		Report	Højer 2'; Čvančara 27'	Stadium: Stadion Střelecký ostrov Attendance: 6,681; Referee: Zbyněk Proske

14 August 2022 3	České Budějovice	2–2	Slovácko	České Budějovice
16:00 CEST (UTC+2)	Čmelík 19'; Škoda 53'	Report	Brandner 3'; Sinyavskiy 83'	Stadium: Stadion Střelecký ostrov Attendance: 3,167; Referee: Dominik Starý

21 August 2022 4	Slovan Liberec	1–1	České Budějovice	Liberec
16:00 CEST (UTC+2)	Van Buren 22'; Mara (yellow card) 90+2'	Report	Sladký (yellow card) 16'; Hora (yellow card) 69'; Havel 90'	Stadium: Stadion u Nisy; Attendance: 4,258; Referee: Pavel Orel

27 August 2022 5	České Budějovice	0–1	Viktoria Plzeň	České Budějovice
16:00 CEST (UTC+2)		Report	Mosquera 90+4'	Stadium: Stadion Střelecký ostrov Attendance: 4,893; Referee: Petr Hocek

30 August 2022 6	Bohemians 1905	1–2	České Budějovice	Prague
17:30 CEST (UTC+2)	Puškáč 59'	Report	Škoda 13'; Sluka 84'	Stadium: Ďolíček; Attendance: 4,202; Referee: Zbyněk Proske

3 September 2022 7	České Budějovice	0–2	Mladá Boleslav	České Budějovice
16:00 CEST (UTC+2)		Report	Ladra 59', 75'	Stadium: Stadion Střelecký ostrov Attendance: 2,531; Referee: Jan Machálek

11 September 2022 8	Slavia Prague	6–1	České Budějovice	Prague
19:00 CEST (UTC+2)	Tecl 18', 45+1'; Schranz 21'; Masopust 52'; Lingr 66'; Ewerton 71'	Report	Potočný 56', (yellow card) 65'; Grič (yellow card) 58'; Hora (red card) 65'; Sluka (yellow card) 82'	Stadium: Fortuna Arena; Attendance: 11,312; Referee: Michal Křepský

17 September 2022 9	České Budějovice	0–3	Sigma Olomouc	České Budějovice
16:00 CEST (UTC+2)	Čolić (yellow card) 90'	Report	Ventúra 25'; Navrátil 42'; Zifčák 53'	Stadium: Stadion Střelecký ostrov Attendance: 2,096; Referee: Miroslav Zelinka

1 October 2022 10	Baník Ostrava	1–2	České Budějovice	Ostrava
16:00 CEST (UTC+2)	Tijani 82'	Report	Hais 2'; Čmelík 50'	Stadium: Městský stadion Attendance: 6,011; Referee: Dalibor Černý

9 October 2022 11	České Budějovice	2–2	Trinity Zlín	České Budějovice
16:00 CEST (UTC+2)	Havel 30'; Hais 34'	Report	Silný 38', (yellow card) 51'; Bartošák 77'	Stadium: Stadion Střelecký ostrov Attendance: 2,779; Referee: Marek Radina

15 October 2022 12	Teplice	0–2	České Budějovice	Teplice
16:00 CEST (UTC+2)		Report	Hellebrand 53'; Čmelík 85'	Stadium: Na Stínadlech; Attendance: 2,431; Referee: Dominik Starý

23 October 2022 13	České Budějovice	0–3	Hradec Králové	České Budějovice
16:00 CEST (UTC+2)		Report	Kubala 53', 65'; Koubek 88'	Stadium: Stadion Střelecký ostrov Attendance: 3,472; Referee: Michal Křepský

29 October 2022 14	Jablonec	3–0	České Budějovice	Jablonec nad Nisou
15:00 CEST (UTC+2)	Houska (yellow card) 24'; Šulc 29'; Kratochvíl (yellow card) 45+3'; Chramosta 76' (pen.); Černák 90+4'	Report	Sladký (yellow card) 39'; Potočný (yellow card) 45+3'; Čoudek (yellow card) 75'	Stadium: Stadion Střelnice; Attendance: 1,811; Referee: Tomáš Batík

5 November 2022 15	České Budějovice	3–2	Zbrojovka Brno	České Budějovice
15:00 CET (UTC+1)	Havel 45+2'; Hlavica 59' (o.g.); Hora 82' (pen.)	Report	Ševčík 47'; Hlavica (yellow card) 81'; Texl 85'; Blecha (yellow card) 90+2'	Stadium: Stadion Střelecký ostrov Attendance: 2,475; Referee: Lukáš Nehasil

12 November 2022 16	Sparta Prague	1–0	České Budějovice	Prague
18:00 CET (UTC+1)	Haraslín 12'	Report		Stadium: Stadion Letná; Attendance: 13,269; Referee: Dominik Starý

28 January 2023 17	Slovácko	1–0	České Budějovice	Uherské Hradiště
15:00 CET (UTC+1)	Holzer 70'	Report		Stadium: Městský fotbalový stadion Miroslava Valenty; Attendance: 2,714; Referee: Jan Všetečka

5 February 2023 18	České Budějovice	0–2	Slovan Liberec	České Budějovice
15:00 CET (UTC+1)	Čolić (yellow card) 15'; Hora (yellow card) 29'; Penner (yellow card) 38'; Potočný (yellow card) 60'; Adediran (yellow card) 70' (yellow-red card) 77'; Janáček (yellow card) 84'	Report	Červ 41'; Rondić 87' (pen.)	Stadium: Stadion Střelecký ostrov Attendance: 1,752; Referee: Dominik Starý

12 February 2023 19	Viktoria Plzeň	2–1	České Budějovice	Plzeň
15:00 CET (UTC+1)	Květ 12', 57'	Report	Jemelka 61' (o.g.)	Stadium: Doosan Arena; Attendance: 8,432; Referee: Jan Petřík

19 February 2023 20	České Budějovice	1–0	Bohemians 1905	České Budějovice
15:00 CET (UTC+1)	Potočný 84'	Report		Stadium: Stadion Střelecký ostrov Attendance: 1,974; Referee: Marek Radina

25 February 2023 21	Mladá Boleslav	2–2	České Budějovice	Mladá Boleslav
15:00 CET (UTC+1)	Kušej 13'; Kubista 58'	Report	Čolić 44' (pen.); Králik 78'	Stadium: Lokotrans Aréna; Attendance: 1,012; Referee: Tomáš Batík

5 March 2023 22	České Budějovice	1–0	Slavia Prague	České Budějovice
17:00 CET (UTC+1)	Čolić (yellow card) 56'; Králik (yellow card) 59'; Adediran 68'	Report		Stadium: Stadion Střelecký ostrov Attendance: 6,316; Referee: Pavel Orel

11 March 2023 23	Sigma Olomouc	3–0	České Budějovice	Olomouc
15:00 CET (UTC+1)	Vodháněl 59', 63'; Růsek 69'	Report		Stadium: Andrův stadion Attendance: 1,620; Referee: Marek Radina

18 March 2023 24	České Budějovice	2–1	Baník Ostrava	České Budějovice
15:00 CET (UTC+1)	Říha 29' (o.g.); Čermák 61'	Report	Fleišman 45'	Stadium: Stadion Střelecký ostrov Attendance: 4,392; Referee: Ondřej Berka

1 April 2023 25	Trinity Zlín	5–1	České Budějovice	Zlín
16:00 CEST (UTC+2)	Kozák 27'; Balaj 43'; Vukadinović 56'; Slončík (yellow card) 77'; Didiba 82'; Kovinič 90+3'	Report	Havel (red card) 1'; Zajíc 78'	Stadium: Letná Stadion; Attendance: 1,729; Referee: Lukáš Nehasil

9 April 2023 26	České Budějovice	0–3	Teplice	České Budějovice
16:00 CEST (UTC+2)		Report	Fila 22'; Gning 48'; Mareček 73'	Stadium: Stadion Střelecký ostrov Attendance: 2,615; Referee: Tomáš Batík

16 April 2023 27	Hradec Králové	2–1	České Budějovice	Mladá Boleslav (Note: Hradec Králové played their home matches in Mladá Boleslav due to the rebuilding of their own Všesportovní stadion, which would finish in June 2023.)
16:00 CEST (UTC+2)	Vašulín 32'; Kučera 35'	Report	Čmelík 84'	Stadium: Lokotrans Aréna; Attendance: 690; Referee: Marek Radina

23 April 2023 28	České Budějovice	5–1	Jablonec	České Budějovice
16:00 CEST (UTC+2)	Hora 18'; Havel 21'; Čmelík 45+2'; Penner (yellow card) 46'; Čoudek 53'; Adediran 70'	Report	Martinec (yellow card) 42'; Souček 59'; Hübschman (yellow card) 82'	Stadium: Stadion Střelecký ostrov Attendance: 2,895; Referee: Lukáš Nehasil

26 April 2023 29	Zbrojovka Brno	1–1	České Budějovice	Brno
17:30 CEST (UTC+2)	Ševčík 31'; Řezníček (yellow card) 37'	Report	Čmelík (yellow card) 35'; Čoudek (yellow card) 63'; Čermák (yellow card) 82', (goal) 90+3'	Stadium: ADAX Invest Arena; Attendance: 4,118; Referee: Michal Křepský

30 April 2023 30	České Budějovice	3–1	Pardubice	České Budějovice
15:00 CEST (UTC+2)	Čermák 42', 67'; Čavoš 54'	Report	Hranáč 89'	Stadium: Stadion Střelecký ostrov Attendance: 3,109; Referee: Miroslav Zelinka

==== Play-off ====
===== First round =====
7 May 2023 First leg	České Budějovice	3–2	Slovan Liberec	České Budějovice
15:00 CEST (UTC+2)	Čermák (yellow card) 16' (yellow-red card) 90+4'; Hellebrand 25'; Adediran 41'; Králik 50'	Report	Olatunji 7'; Tupta 10'; Červ (yellow card) 79' (yellow-red card) 84'	Stadium: Stadion Střelecký ostrov Attendance: 3,246; Referee: Josef Krejsa

13 May 2023 Second leg	Slovan Liberec	4–0 (6–3 agg.)	České Budějovice	Liberec
15:00 CEST (UTC+2)	Kozák 38'; Varfolomeyev (yellow card) 45+2'; Frýdek 66'; Tupta 81'; Olatunji 89'	Report	Adediran (yellow card) 29'; Havel (yellow card) 78'; Čoudek (yellow card) 88'	Stadium: Stadion u Nisy; Attendance: 1,358; Referee: Tomáš Ulrich
Note: Slovan Liberec won 6–3 on aggregate.
