= 2021–22 SK Dynamo České Budějovice season =

České Budějovice
2021–22 season
- Chairman: Martin Vozábal
- Manager: David Horejš
- Stadium: Stadion Střelecký ostrov
- Czech First League: 10th
- Czech Cup: Fourth round
| Home colours | Away colours |

The 2021–22 season was the 30th season in the existence of SK Dynamo České Budějovice and the club's 10th consecutive season in the top flight of Czech football. In addition to the domestic league, České Budějovice participated in this season's edition of the Czech Cup.

== Players ==
=== First-team squad ===
As of 8 July 2021

Note: Flags indicate national team as defined under FIFA eligibility rules; some limited exceptions apply. Players may hold more than one non-FIFA nationality.

| No. | Pos. | Nation | Player |
|---|---|---|---|
| 1 | GK | SVK | Dávid Šípoš |
| 2 | DF | CZE | Lukáš Havel |
| 3 | DF | SVK | Martin Králik |
| 4 | DF | UKR | Maksym Talovierov |
| 5 | DF | CZE | Pavel Novák |
| 10 | FW | CZE | Michal Škoda |
| 11 | MF | CZE | Patrik Čavoš |
| 12 | DF | BIH | Benjamin Čolić |
| 14 | FW | NGR | Fortune Bassey |
| 15 | DF | CZE | Dominik Mašek |
| 16 | MF | CZE | Jonáš Vais |

| No. | Pos. | Nation | Player |
|---|---|---|---|
| 17 | FW | CZE | Ondřej Mihálik |
| 18 | MF | SVK | Patrik Hellebrand |
| 19 | MF | CZE | Patrik Brandner |
| 20 | MF | CZE | Petr Javorek |
| 21 | MF | CZE | Matěj Valenta |
| 22 | DF | CZE | Martin Sladký |
| 23 | MF | CZE | Jakub Hora |
| 25 | DF | SVK | Lukáš Skovajsa |
| 27 | MF | CRO | Matej Mršić |
| 30 | GK | CZE | Vojtěch Vorel (loaned from Sparta Prague) |
| 33 | GK | CZE | Daniel Kerl |

=== Out on loan ===
Note: Flags indicate national team as defined under FIFA eligibility rules; some limited exceptions apply. Players may hold more than one non-FIFA nationality.

| No. | Pos. | Nation | Player |
|---|---|---|---|
| — | DF | CZE | Miloš Kopečný (at FK Senica) |

== Competitions ==
=== Overall record ===
| Competition | First match | Last match | Starting round | Final position | Record | | | | | | | |
| Competition | First match | Last match | Starting round | Final position | Pld | W | D | L | GF | GA | GD | Win % |
|---|---|---|---|---|---|---|---|---|---|---|---|---|
| Czech First League | 25 July 2021 | 20 April 2022 | Matchday 1 | 10th | 30 | 9 | 9 | 12 | 40 | 46 | −6 | 30.00 |
| Czech First League play-off | 24 April 2022 | 30 April 2022 | First round | First round | 2 | 0 | 0 | 2 | 2 | 4 | −2 | 0.00 |
| Czech Cup | 25 August 2021 | 23 November 2021 | Second round | Fourth round | 3 | 2 | 1 | 0 | 10 | 2 | +8 | 66.67 |
| Total | | | | | 35 | 11 | 10 | 14 | 52 | 52 | +0 | 31.43 |

Source: Soccerway

=== Czech First League ===
==== League table ====
| Pos | Team | Pld | W | D | L | GF | GA | GD | Pts | Qualification or relegation |
|---|---|---|---|---|---|---|---|---|---|---|
| 8 | Slovan Liberec | 30 | 10 | 7 | 13 | 29 | 38 | −9 | 37 | Qualification for the play-off |
| 9 | Sigma Olomouc | 30 | 9 | 10 | 11 | 39 | 37 | +2 | 37 | Qualification for the play-off |
| 10 | České Budějovice | 30 | 9 | 9 | 12 | 40 | 46 | −6 | 36 | Qualification for the play-off |
| 11 | Fastav Zlín | 30 | 8 | 6 | 16 | 36 | 53 | −17 | 30 | Qualification for the relegation group |
| 12 | Teplice | 30 | 8 | 3 | 19 | 29 | 49 | −20 | 27 | Qualification for the relegation group |

Source: Fortuna Liga
Rules for classification: 1) Points; 2) Head-to-head points; 3) Head-to-head goal difference; 4) Head-to-head goals scored; 5) Goal difference; 6) Goals scored; 7) Fair-play ranking; 8) Draw.

==== Results summary ====
| Overall | | | | | | | | Home | | | | | | Away | | | | | |
| Pld | W | D | L | GF | GA | GD | Pts | W | D | L | GF | GA | GD | W | D | L | GF | GA | GD |
|---|---|---|---|---|---|---|---|---|---|---|---|---|---|---|---|---|---|---|---|
| 30 | 9 | 9 | 12 | 40 | 46 | −6 | 36 | 9 | 3 | 3 | 24 | 16 | +8 | 0 | 6 | 9 | 16 | 30 | −14 |

Source: Fortuna Liga

==== Matches ====
| 25 July 2021 1 | České Budějovice | 1–0 | Teplice | České Budějovice |
| 16:00 CEST (UTC+2) | Mihálik 62' | Report | | Stadium: Stadion Střelecký ostrov Attendance: 2,147; Referee: Tomáš Klíma |

| 1 August 2021 2 | Slovácko | 1–0 | České Budějovice | Uherské Hradiště |
| 16:00 CEST (UTC+2) | Kohút 60' | Report | | Stadium: Městský fotbalový stadion Miroslava Valenty; Attendance: 2,953; Referee: Jan Petřík |

| 7 August 2021 3 | České Budějovice | 1–3 | Baník Ostrava | České Budějovice |
| 16:00 CEST (UTC+2) | Bassey 58' | Report | Kuzmanović 35'; Tetour 52'; Lischka 88' | Stadium: Stadion Střelecký ostrov Attendance: 3,286; Referee: Miroslav Zelinka |

| 14 August 2021 4 | Sigma Olomouc | 3–3 | České Budějovice | Olomouc |
| 14:00 CEST (UTC+2) | Jemelka 52'; Zifčák 86'; Poulolo 90+7' | Report | Bassey 9'; Čavoš 41'; Tolno 61' | Stadium: Andrův stadion Attendance: 2,619; Referee: Dalibor Černý |

| 22 August 2021 5 | České Budějovice | 1–0 | Slovan Liberec | České Budějovice |
| 16:00 CEST (UTC+2) | Sladký 18' | Report | | Stadium: Stadion Střelecký ostrov Attendance: 2,679; Referee: Tomáš Batík |

| 28 August 2021 6 | Sparta Prague | 1–0 | České Budějovice | Prague |
| 19:00 CEST (UTC+2) | Hancko 38' | Report | | Stadium: Generali Arena; Attendance: 6,363; Referee: Pavel Franěk |

| 12 September 2021 7 | České Budějovice | 0–1 | Hradec Králové | České Budějovice |
| 14:00 CEST (UTC+2) | | Report | Vašulín 53' | Stadium: Stadion Střelecký ostrov Attendance: 2,842; Referee: Ondřej Ginzel |

| 18 September 2021 8 | Viktoria Plzeň | 2–1 | České Budějovice | Plzeň |
| 19:00 CEST (UTC+2) | Řezník 69'; Hejda 80' | Report | Bassey 53' | Stadium: Doosan Arena; Attendance: 9,312; Referee: Jan Petřík |

| 25 September 2021 9 | České Budějovice | 3–1 | Karviná | České Budějovice |
| 16:00 CEST (UTC+2) | van Buren 28'; Hora 35'; Mihálik 60' | Report | Křapka 26' | Stadium: Stadion Střelecký ostrov Attendance: 1,673; Referee: Ladislav Szikszay |

| 2 October 2021 10 | České Budějovice | 3–1 | Pardubice | České Budějovice |
| 16:00 CEST (UTC+2) | van Buren 26'; Hora 42'; Bassey 53' | Report | Šejvl 21' | Stadium: Stadion Střelecký ostrov Attendance: 1,898; Referee: Pavel Julínek |

| 16 October 2021 11 | Jablonec | 2–2 | České Budějovice | Jablonec nad Nisou |
| 16:00 CEST (UTC+2) | Doležal 15', 78' | Report | Mršić 20'; Mihálik 23' | Stadium: Stadion Střelnice; Attendance: 2,424; Referee: Miroslav Zelinka |

| 24 October 2021 12 | České Budějovice | 2–2 | Slavia Prague | České Budějovice |
| 16:00 CEST (UTC+2) | Brandner 10'; Havel 14' | Report | Olayinka 52' (pen.); Dorley 59' | Stadium: Stadion Střelecký ostrov Attendance: 6,289; Referee: Jan Machálek |

| 30 October 2021 13 | Fastav Zlín | 2–0 | České Budějovice | Zlín |
| 15:00 CEST (UTC+2) | Tkáč 37'; Hrubý 59' | Report | | Stadium: Letná Stadion; Attendance: 1,862; Referee: Marek Radina |

| 6 November 2021 14 | České Budějovice | 2–1 | Mladá Boleslav | České Budějovice |
| 15:00 CET (UTC+1) | Bassey 31'; Mršić 62' | Report | Mil. Škoda 30' | Stadium: Stadion Střelecký ostrov Attendance: 1,694; Referee: Pavel Orel |

| 20 November 2021 15 | Bohemians 1905 | 3–1 | České Budějovice | Prague |
| 15:00 CET (UTC+1) | Keita 24'; Hronek 35'; Koubek 88' | Report | Bassey 59' | Stadium: Ďolíček; Attendance: 3,496; Referee: Tomáš Klíma |

| 27 November 2021 16 | České Budějovice | 3–2 | Slovácko | České Budějovice |
| 15:00 CET (UTC+1) | Valenta 72'; Bassey 82', 85' | Report | Kalabiška 19'; Sadílek 52' | Stadium: Stadion Střelecký ostrov Attendance: 822; Referee: Ondřej Ginzel |

| 5 December 2021 17 | Baník Ostrava | 4–1 | České Budějovice | Ostrava |
| 15:00 CET (UTC+1) | Klíma 2'; Fleišman 7'; Buchta 27'; Kuzmanović 87' | Report | Mic. Škoda 86' | Stadium: Městský stadion Attendance: 1,000; Referee: Tomáš Batík |

| 12 December 2021 18 | České Budějovice | 2–1 | Sigma Olomouc | České Budějovice |
| 15:00 CET (UTC+1) | Bassey 35'; Čolić 87' (pen.) | Report | González 57' | Stadium: Stadion Střelecký ostrov Attendance: 903; Referee: Josef Krejsa |

| 19 December 2021 19 | Slovan Liberec | 0–0 | České Budějovice | Liberec |
| 15:00 CET (UTC+1) | | Report | | Stadium: Stadion u Nisy; Attendance: 1,000; Referee: Pavel Franěk |

| 5 February 2022 20 | České Budějovice | 0–0 | Sparta Prague | České Budějovice |
| 18:00 CET (UTC+1) | | Report | | Stadium: Stadion Střelecký ostrov Attendance: 1,000; Referee: Dalibor Černý |

| 12 February 2022 21 | Hradec Králové | 2–2 | České Budějovice | Mladá Boleslav |
| 15:00 CET (UTC+1) | Rada 26', 76' (pen.) | Report | van Buren 45+1'; Mic. Škoda 56' | Stadium: Lokotrans Aréna (Note: Hradec Králové played their home matches in Mladá Boleslav due to the rebuilding of their own Všesportovní stadion.); Attendance: 638; Referee: Marek Radina |

| 19 February 2022 22 | České Budějovice | 0–1 | Viktoria Plzeň | České Budějovice |
| 18:00 CET (UTC+1) | | Report | Bucha 100' | Stadium: Stadion Střelecký ostrov Attendance: 3,278; Referee: Tomáš Klíma |

| 27 February 2022 23 | Karviná | 2–2 | České Budějovice | Karviná |
| 15:00 CET (UTC+1) | Bartošák 44'; Zorvan 50' | Report | Mic. Škoda 49'; Králik 80' | Stadium: Městský stadion Attendance: 1,412; Referee: Ladislav Szikszay |

| 5 March 2022 24 | Pardubice | 3–3 | České Budějovice | Prague |
| 15:00 CET (UTC+1) | Solil 27'; Vacek 50'; Cadu 71' (pen.) | Report | Hora 45'; Havel 57'; Čolić 87' | Stadium: Ďolíček (Note: Pardubice continued playing their home matches in Ďolíček due to the rebuilding of their own stadium Pod Vinicí.); Attendance: 645; Referee: Miroslav Zelinka |

| 13 March 2022 25 | České Budějovice | 2–0 | Jablonec | České Budějovice |
| 15:00 CET (UTC+1) | Čolić 5'; Mic. Škoda 43' | Report | | Stadium: Stadion Střelecký ostrov Attendance: 2,854; Referee: Tomáš Batík |

| 20 March 2022 26 | Slavia Prague | 1–0 | České Budějovice | Prague |
| 18:00 CET (UTC+1) | Lingr 58' | Report | | Stadium: Fortuna Arena; Attendance: 10,673; Referee: Miroslav Zelinka |

| 2 April 2022 27 | České Budějovice | 2–2 | Fastav Zlín | České Budějovice |
| 16:00 CEST (UTC+2) | Mihálik 6'; Cedidla 53' (o.g.) | Report | Konda 30' (o.g.); Janetzký 76' | Stadium: Stadion Střelecký ostrov Attendance: 1,365; Referee: Michal Křepský |

| 10 April 2022 28 | Mladá Boleslav | 2–0 | České Budějovice | Mladá Boleslav |
| 16:00 CEST (UTC+2) | Ewerton 31'; Douděra 77' | Report | | Stadium: Lokotrans Aréna; Attendance: 1,033; Referee: Josef Krejsa |

| 17 April 2022 29 | České Budějovice | 2–1 | Bohemians 1905 | České Budějovice |
| 17:00 CEST (UTC+2) | van Buren 39'; Skovajsa 64' | Report | Květ 20' (pen.) | Stadium: Stadion Střelecký ostrov Attendance: 4,113; Referee: Miroslav Zelinka |

| 20 April 2022 30 | Teplice | 2–1 | České Budějovice | Teplice |
| 18:00 CEST (UTC+2) | Tijani 28'; Sejk 53' | Report | Mic. Škoda 19' | Stadium: Na Stínadlech; Attendance: 1,620; Referee: Zbyněk Proske |

==== Play-off ====
===== First round =====
| 24 April 2022 First leg | České Budějovice | 2–3 | Mladá Boleslav | České Budějovice |
| 16:00 CEST (UTC+2) | Čavoš 19'; Tolno 73' | Report | Douděra 13', 17'; Ladra 41' | Stadium: Stadion Střelecký ostrov Attendance: 2,125; Referee: Tomáš Batík |

| 30 April 2022 Second leg | Mladá Boleslav | 1–0 (4–2 agg.) | České Budějovice | Mladá Boleslav |
| 16:00 CEST (UTC+2) | Douděra 87' | Report | | Stadium: Lokotrans Aréna; Attendance: 1,016; Referee: Lukáš Nehasil |
Note: Mladá Boleslav won 4–2 on aggregate.

=== Czech Cup ===
| 25 August 2021 Second round | Tatran Sedlčany | 0–6 | České Budějovice | Sedlčany |
| 17:00 CEST (UTC+2) | Mic. Škoda 21', 58'; M. Mršić 43', 60'; Bassey 63'; Hellebrand 69' | Report | | Stadium: Městský stadion |

| 6 October 2021 Third round | Dukla Prague | 1–3 | České Budějovice | Prague |
| 15:30 CEST (UTC+2) | L. Buchvaldek 32' | Report | Brandner 61'; Čolić 80' (pen.); van Buren 90+2' | Stadium: Stadion Juliska; Referee: Tomáš Klíma |

| 23 November 2021 Fourth round | České Budějovice | 1–1 (4–5 p) | Sigma Olomouc | České Budějovice |
| 16:00 CET (UTC+1) | Brandner 9' | Report | Růsek 60' | Stadium: Stadion Střelecký ostrov Referee: Jan Machálek |
Note: Sigma Olomouc won on penalty kicks 5–4.
