= 2021–22 MFK Karviná season =

MFK Karviná
2021–22 season
- Chairman: Petr Hort
- Manager: Jozef Weber
- Stadium: Městský stadion
- Czech First League: 10th
- Czech Cup: Pre-season
Home colours	Away colours	Third colours

The 2021–22 season is the 25th season in the existence of MFK Karviná and the club's 15th consecutive season in the top flight of Czech football. In addition to the domestic league, MFK Karviná are participating in this season's edition of the Czech Cup.

== Players ==
=== First-team squad ===
As of 6 July 2021

Note: Flags indicate national team as defined under FIFA eligibility rules; some limited exceptions apply. Players may hold more than one non-FIFA nationality.

No.	Pos.	Nation	Player
1	GK	CZE	Vladimir Neuman
2	DF	BRA	Leonardo Santos
5	DF	CZE	Daniel Stropek
3	DF	GRE	Stelios Kokovas
6	MF	ALB	Kristi Qose
7	MF	CZE	Aleš Nešický
10	MF	SVK	Lukáš Čmelík
12	GK	CZE	Jiří Ciupa
13	DF	CZE	Martin Šindelář
15	MF	CZE	Tomáš Jursa
19	FW	CZE	Antonín Svoboda
21	MF	BRA	Jean Mangabeira
22	DF	FRA	Soufiane Dramé

No.	Pos.	Nation	Player
23	DF	CZE	Daniel Stropek
26	GK	CZE	Petr Bolek
27	FW	CZE	Michal Papadopulos
28	FW	POL	Kacper Zych
29	MF	SVK	Rajmund Mikuš
30	DF	CZE	Petr Buchta
31	MF	CZE	Lukáš Bartošák
34	DF	CZE	Antonín Křapka
44	DF	BRA	Eduardo Santos
99	MF	EST	Vlasiy Sinyavskiy
—	GK	CZE	Martin Pastornický
—	FW	CZE	Martin Vlachovský

=== Out on loan ===
Note: Flags indicate national team as defined under FIFA eligibility rules; some limited exceptions apply. Players may hold more than one non-FIFA nationality.

No.	Pos.	Nation	Player
—	MF	CZE	Vojtěch Smrž (on loan at FK Mladá Boleslav)
—	MF	UKR	Ivan Zhelizko (on loan at Valmiera FC)

== Pre-season and friendlies ==
Win Draw Loss Fixtures

== Competitions ==
=== Overall record ===
Competition	First match	Last match	Starting round	Record							
Competition	First match	Last match	Starting round	Pld	W	D	L	GF	GA	GD	Win %
Czech First League	25 July 2021	May 2022	Matchday 1	2	0	0	2	0	6	−6	0.00
Czech Cup	TBD			0	0	0	0	0	0	+0	—
Total				2	0	0	2	0	6	−6	0.00

Last updated: 31 July 2021
Source: Soccerway

=== Czech First League ===
==== League table ====
Pos	Team	Pld	W	D	L	GF	GA	GD	Pts	Qualification or relegation
12	Teplice	30	8	3	19	29	49	−20	27	Qualification for the relegation group
13	Jablonec	30	4	14	12	22	45	−23	26	Qualification for the relegation group
14	Bohemians 1905	30	6	8	16	34	56	−22	26	Qualification for the relegation group
15	Pardubice	30	5	9	16	35	67	−32	24	Qualification for the relegation group
16	Karviná	30	3	8	19	30	52	−22	17	Qualification for the relegation group

Source: Fortuna Liga
Rules for classification: 1) Points; 2) Head-to-head points; 3) Head-to-head goal difference; 4) Head-to-head goals scored; 5) Goal difference; 6) Goals scored; 7) Fair-play ranking; 8) Draw.

Pos	Team	Pld	W	D	L	GF	GA	GD	Pts	Qualification or relegation	PLZ	SLA	SPA	SLO	OST	HKR
1	Viktoria Plzeň (C)	35	26	7	2	63	21	+42	85	Qualification for the Champions League second qualifying round	—	—	3–0	3–1	1–0	—
2	Slavia Prague	35	24	6	5	80	27	+53	78	Qualification for the Europa Conference League second qualifying round	1–1	—	1–2	3–0	—	—
3	Sparta Prague	35	22	7	6	72	40	+32	73	Qualification for the Europa Conference League second qualifying round	—	—	—	1–2	3–1	1–1
4	Slovácko	35	21	5	9	59	38	+21	68	Qualification to Europa League third qualifying round (Note: Slovácko qualified for the Europa League as Czech Cup winners.)	—	—	—	—	3–1	3–0
5	Baník Ostrava	35	15	10	10	60	48	+12	55		—	1–1	—	—	—	3–1
6	Hradec Králové	35	10	14	11	44	52	−8	44		0–2	4–3	—	—	—	—

Source: Fortuna Liga
Legend: Blue = home team win; Yellow = draw; Red = away team win.
Rules for classification: 1) Total points; 2) Points earned in regular season; 3) Head-to-head points (regular season); 4) Head-to-head goal difference (regular season); 5) Head-to-head goals scored (regular season); 5) Goal difference (all matches); 6) Goals scored (all matches); 7) Fair-play ranking; 8) Draw.
(C) Champions
Notes:

Pos	Team	Pld	W	D	L	GF	GA	GD	Pts	Qualification or relegation	PCE	ZLN	JAB	BOH	TEP	KAR
12	Fastav Zlín	35	9	9	17	43	60	−17	36		—	—	1–1	1–4	3–0	—
13	Jablonec	35	6	16	13	27	48	−21	34		0–1	—	—	1–1	—	2–0
14	Bohemians 1905 (O)	35	8	10	17	45	61	−16	34	Qualification for the relegation play-offs	0–1	—	—	—	—	4–0
15	Teplice (O)	35	8	5	22	33	59	−26	29	Qualification for the relegation play-offs	0–2	—	0–1	2–2	—	—
16	Karviná (R)	35	3	10	22	33	63	−30	19	Relegation to the FNL	—	1–1	—	—	2–2	—

Source: Fortuna Liga
Legend: Blue = home team win; Yellow = draw; Red = away team win.
Rules for classification: 1) Total points; 2) Points earned in regular season; 3) Head-to-head points (regular season); 4) Head-to-head goal difference (regular season); 5) Head-to-head goals scored (regular season); 5) Goal difference (all matches); 6) Goals scored (all matches); 7) Fair-play ranking; 8) Draw.
(O) Play-off winners; (R) Relegated

==== Results summary ====
Overall								Home						Away					
Pld	W	D	L	GF	GA	GD	Pts	W	D	L	GF	GA	GD	W	D	L	GF	GA	GD
0	0	0	0	0	0	0	0	0	0	0	0	0	0	0	0	0	0	0	0

Last updated: 31 July 2021.
Source: Fortuna Liga

==== Results by round ====
Round	1	2	3	4	5	6	7	8	9	10	11	12	13	14	15	16	17	18	19	20	21	22	23	24	25	26	27	28	29	30
Ground	H	H	A																											
Result																														
Position																														

Updated to match(es) played on 31 July 2021. Source: Fortuna Liga
A = Away; H = Home; W = Win; D = Draw; L = Loss

==== Matches ====
24 July 2021 1	Pardubice	2–2	Karviná	Prague (Note: Pardubice continued playing their home matches in Ďolíček due to the rebuilding of their own stadium Pod Vinicí.)
16:00 CEST (UTC+2)	Tischler 64', 75'	Report	Qose 5' (pen.); Papadopulos 49'	Stadium: Ďolíček; Attendance: 805; Referee: Karel Hrubeš

31 July 2021 2	Karviná	1–1	Hradec Králové	Karviná
16:00 CEST (UTC+2)	Sinyavskiy 24'	Report	Dvořák 5'	Stadium: Městský stadion Attendance: 2,053; Referee: Ondřej Cieslar

7 August 2021 3	Sparta Prague	2–0	Karviná	Prague
16:00 CEST (UTC+2)	Hložek 23'; Pavelka 78'	Report	Čmelík (yellow card) 72'	Stadium: Generali Arena; Attendance: 5,136; Referee: Petr Hocek

14 August 2021 4	Karviná	2–3	Fastav Zlín	Karviná
16:00 CEST (UTC+2)	Buchta 23'; Papadopulos 47'	Report	Fillo 60'; Poznar 79' (pen.); Cedidla 90+2'	Stadium: Městský stadion Attendance: 1,597; Referee: Jan Machálek

22 August 2021 5	Viktoria Plzeň	2–0	Karviná	Plzeň
16:00 CEST (UTC+2)	Chorý 33' (pen.); Janošek (yellow card) 55'; Kaša 76'; Havel (yellow card) 77'	Report	Křapka (yellow card) 33'; Papadopulos (yellow card) 37'; Santos (yellow card) 45'; Šehić (yellow card) 68'; Jurásek (yellow card) 75'	Stadium: Doosan Arena; Attendance: 6,520; Referee: Ondřej Pechanec

29 August 2021 6	Karviná	3–3	Slavia Prague	Karviná
19:00 CEST (UTC+2)	Papadopulos 27'; Svoboda 56'; Zych 90+1'	Report	Schranz 35'; Kacharaba 45'; Traoré 64'	Stadium: Městský stadion Attendance: 3,680; Referee: Pavel Julínek

12 September 2021 7	Jablonec	1–0	Karviná	Jablonec nad Nisou
16:00 CEST (UTC+2)	Malínský 45+3'	Report		Stadium: Stadion Střelnice; Attendance: 2,468; Referee: Tomáš Batík

19 September 2021 8	Karviná	1–1	Teplice	Karviná
16:00 CEST (UTC+2)	Čmelík 54'	Report	Trubač 55'	Stadium: Městský stadion Attendance: 2,138; Referee: Jan Machálek

25 September 2021 9	České Budějovice	3–1	Karviná	České Budějovice
16:00 CEST (UTC+2)	van Buren 28'; Hora 35'; Mihálik 60'	Report	Křapka 26'	Stadium: Stadion Střelecký ostrov Attendance: 1,673; Referee: Ladislav Szikszay

3 October 2021 10	Karviná	0–1	Mladá Boleslav	Karviná
16:00 CEST (UTC+2)		Report	Matějovský 81'	Stadium: Městský stadion Attendance: 2,082; Referee: Jan Petřík

17 October 2021 11	Sigma Olomouc	2–0	Karviná	Olomouc
16:00 CEST (UTC+2)	Růsek 7'; González 53' (pen.)	Report		Stadium: Andrův stadion Attendance: 2,959; Referee: Petr Hocek

7 November 2021 14	Karviná	2–2	Slovácko	Karviná
15:00 CET (UTC+1)	Papadopulos 11'; Túlio 81'	Report	Hofmann 37'; Kalabiška 56'	Stadium: Městský stadion Attendance: 1,820; Referee: Ladislav Szikszay

21 November 2021 15	Karviná	1–2	Slovan Liberec	Karviná
15:00 CET (UTC+1)	Túlio 17'	Report	Rabušic 38' (pen.); Helal 90+1'	Stadium: Městský stadion Attendance: 2,035; Referee: Pavel Orel

24 November 2021 12	Karviná	1–2	Baník Ostrava	Karviná
17:00 CET (UTC+1)	Santos 58'	Report	Sor 68'; Klíma 90+2'	Stadium: Městský stadion Attendance: 3,126; Referee: Miroslav Zelinka
Note: The match was postponed due to the isolation and quarantine measures imposed on the Karviná team.

28 November 2021 16	Hradec Králové	1–0	Karviná	Mladá Boleslav (Note: Hradec Králové played their home matches in Mladá Boleslav due to the rebuilding of their own Všesportovní stadion.)
15:00 CET (UTC+1)	Rada 45+3'	Report		Stadium: Lokotrans Aréna; Attendance: 246; Referee: Josef Krejsa

1 December 2021 13	Bohemians 1905	3–0	Karviná	Prague
18:00 CET (UTC+1)	Puškáč 22'; Köstl 24'; Necid 81'	Report		Stadium: Ďolíček; Attendance: 1,000; Referee: Pavel Franěk
Note: The match was postponed due to the isolation and quarantine measures imposed on the Karviná team.

4 December 2021 17	Karviná	1–2	Sparta Prague	Karviná
15:00 CET (UTC+1)	Sinyavskiy 78'	Report	Pulkrab 60'; Haraslín 76'	Stadium: Městský stadion Attendance: 1,000; Referee: Ondřej Berka

11 December 2021 18	Fastav Zlín	2–1	Karviná	Zlín
15:00 CET (UTC+1)	Poznar 9', 50'	Report	Bartošák 28'	Stadium: Letná Stadion; Attendance: 512; Referee: Jan Machálek

18 December 2021 19	Karviná	0–1	Viktoria Plzeň	Karviná
15:00 CET (UTC+1)		Report	Havel 45'	Stadium: Městský stadion Attendance: 912; Referee: Tomáš Klíma

5 February 2022 20	Slavia Prague	0–1	Karviná	Prague
15:00 CET (UTC+1)	Schranz (yellow card) 48'; Bah (yellow card) 53'; Ousou (yellow card) 89'	Report	Čmelík (yellow card) 28'; Jánoš (yellow card) 47'; Durosinmi 69', (yellow card) 89'; Látal (yellow card) 84'; Bartošák (yellow card) 89'	Stadium: Sinobo Stadium; Attendance: 1,000; Referee: Tomáš Batík

13 February 2022 21	Karviná	1–1	Jablonec	Karviná
15:00 CET (UTC+1)	Čmelík 51' (pen.)	Report	Pilař 85'	Stadium: Městský stadion Attendance: 1,000; Referee: Tomáš Klíma

20 February 2022 22	Teplice	1–0	Karviná	Teplice
15:00 CET (UTC+1)	Fortelný 22'	Report		Stadium: Na Stínadlech; Attendance: 2,361; Referee: Miroslav Zelinka

27 February 2022 23	Karviná	2–2	České Budějovice	Karviná
15:00 CET (UTC+1)	Bartošák 44'; Zorvan 50'	Report	Mic. Škoda 49'; Králik 80'	Stadium: Městský stadion Attendance: 1,412; Referee: Ladislav Szikszay

6 March 2022 24	Mladá Boleslav	1–0	Karviná	Mladá Boleslav
15:00 CET (UTC+1)	Douděra 21'	Report		Stadium: Lokotrans Aréna; Attendance: 1,832; Referee: Tomáš Klíma

13 March 2022 25	Karviná	1–2	Sigma Olomouc	Karviná
15:00 CET (UTC+1)	Papadopulos 51'	Report	Greššák 5'; Navrátil 58'	Stadium: Městský stadion Attendance: 1,620; Referee: Zbyněk Proske

19 March 2022 26	Baník Ostrava	1–3	Karviná	Ostrava
15:00 CET (UTC+1)	Almási 66'	Report	Zorvan 10'; Durosinmi 13'; Bartošák 27'	Stadium: Městský stadion Attendance: 7,076; Referee: Ladislav Szikszay

3 April 2022 27	Karviná	1–1	Bohemians 1905	Karviná
16:00 CEST (UTC+2)	Šehić 24'	Report	Květ 69'	Stadium: Městský stadion Attendance: 2,056; Referee: Petr Hocek

9 April 2022 28	Slovácko	3–1	Karviná	Uherské Hradiště
16:00 CEST (UTC+2)	Túlio 2' (o.g.); Cicilia 49'; Hofmann 61'	Report	Sinyavskiy 78'	Stadium: Městský fotbalový stadion Miroslava Valenty; Attendance: 3,095; Referee: Tomáš Klíma

17 April 2022 29	Slovan Liberec	2–1	Karviná	Liberec
17:00 CEST (UTC+2)	Rabušic 31' (pen.); Koscelník 60'	Report	N'Diaye 12'	Stadium: Stadion u Nisy; Attendance: 1,521; Referee: Jan Petřík

20 April 2022 30	Karviná	3–2	Pardubice	Karviná
18:00 CEST (UTC+2)	Papadopulos 3'; Buchta 70'; Durosinmi 87'	Report	Černý 4'; Červ 56'	Stadium: Městský stadion Attendance: 1,215; Referee: Marek Radina

==== Relegation group ====
1 May 2022 32	Jablonec	2–0	Karviná	Jablonec nad Nisou
16:00 CEST (UTC+2)	Martinec 15'; Zelený 42'	Report		Stadium: Stadion Střelnice; Attendance: 1,701; Referee: Miroslav Zelinka

14 May 2022 35	Bohemians 1905	4–0	Karviná	Prague
18:00 CEST (UTC+2)	Puškáč 24', 27', 47', 52'	Report		Stadium: Ďolíček; Attendance: 4,028; Referee: Miroslav Zelinka
