= 2024–25 SK Dynamo České Budějovice season =

SK Dynamo České Budějovice
2024–25 season
- Stadium: Stadion Střelecký ostrov
- Czech First League: Regular season: 16th Relegation round: 6th (relegated)
- Czech Cup: Pre-season
- Average home league attendance: 2,898
Home colours	Away colours

The 2024–25 season is the 125th season in the history of SK Dynamo České Budějovice, and the club's sixth consecutive season in Czech First League. In addition to the domestic league, the team is scheduled to participate in the Czech Cup.

== Transfers ==
=== In ===
Pos.	Player	Transferred from	Fee	Date	Source
MF	(Nigeria) Marvis Ogiomade	(Czech Republic) Jihlava	Loan	11 July 2024	

=== Out ===
Pos.	Player	Transferred to	Fee	Date	Source
DF	(Czech Republic) Martin Sladký		Retired	1 July 2024	
MF	(Czech Republic) Roman Potočný	(Czech Republic) Zbrojovka Brno	Undisloced	1 July 2024	
MF	(Czech Republic) Patrik Hellebrand	(Poland) Górnik Zabrze	End of contract	1 July 2024	

== Friendlies ==
=== Pre-season ===
29 June 2024 Friendly	České Budějovice (Czech Republic)	7–1	(Czech Republic) Žižkov	Lišov
11:00	11'; 30'; 45'; 62' (pen.); 66'; 81', 89'		75'	Stadium: UMT Lišov

3 July 2024 Friendly	České Budějovice (Czech Republic)	4–3	(Czech Republic) Vysočina Jihlava	Temelín
17:00	Osmancik 34'; Ogiomade 49'; Tranziska 52' (pen.); Skalák 66'		(penalty missed) 48'; Franěk 48'; Smutny 60'; Pešek 82'	Stadium: Hřište Temelín

5 July 2024 Friendly	LASK (Austria)	2–2	(Czech Republic) České Budějovice	Pasching
16:00	Žulj 9'; Flecker 30'		Čermák 12'; Sigut 58'	Stadium: voestalpine Stadium

13 July 2024 Friendly	České Budějovice (Czech Republic)	4–2	(Austria) Ried	České Budějovice
18:00	Zíka 42'; Suchan 44', (penalty missed) 55'; Ondrášek 64', 90+2'		Grosse 53'; Beganović 59'	Stadium: Stadion Střelecký ostrov

=== Mid-season ===
21 January 2025 Friendly	Táborsko (Czech Republic)	2–3	(Czech Republic) České Budějovice
10:30

25 January 2025 Friendly	České Budějovice (Czech Republic)	4–3	(Czech Republic) Sparta Prague B
16:00

== Competitions ==
=== Overall record ===
Competition	First match	Last match	Starting round	Final position	Record							
Competition	First match	Last match	Starting round	Final position	Pld	W	D	L	GF	GA	GD	Win %
Czech First League regular season	20 July 2024	19 April 2025	Matchday 1	14th	0	0	0	0	0	0	+0	—
Czech First League relegation round	26 April 2024	25 May 2025	Matchday 1		0	0	0	0	0	0	+0	—
Czech Cup					0	0	0	0	0	0	+0	—
Total					0	0	0	0	0	0	+0	—

Source: Soccerway

=== Czech First League ===
==== Regular season ====
Pos	Team	Pld	W	D	L	GF	GA	GD	Pts	Qualification or relegation
12	Teplice	30	9	7	14	32	42	−10	34 (Note: Head to head points: Bohemians 1905 8, Mladá Boleslav 7, Teplice 1.)	Qualification for the relegation group
13	Slovácko	30	7	9	14	25	51	−26	30	Qualification for the relegation group
14	Dukla Prague	30	5	9	16	23	47	−24	24	Qualification for the relegation group
15	Pardubice	30	4	7	19	22	49	−27	19	Qualification for the relegation group
16	České Budějovice	30	0	5	25	14	78	−64	5	Qualification for the relegation group

Source: Chance Liga
Rules for classification: 1) Points; 2) Head-to-head points; 3) Head-to-head goal difference; 4) Head-to-head goals scored; 5) Goal difference; 6) Goals scored; 7) Fair-play ranking; 8) Draw.

==== Results summary ====
Overall								Home						Away					
Pld	W	D	L	GF	GA	GD	Pts	W	D	L	GF	GA	GD	W	D	L	GF	GA	GD
0	0	0	0	0	0	0	0	0	0	0	0	0	0	0	0	0	0	0	0

Source: Chance Liga

==== Results by round ====
Round	1
Ground	H
Result	
Position	

Source: Chance Liga
A = Away; H = Home; W = Win; D = Draw; L = Loss

==== Matches ====
The match schedule was released on 20 June 2024.

20 July 2024 1	Dynamo České Budějovice	v	Sigma Olomouc	České Budějovice
17:00				Stadium: Stadion Střelecký ostrov

==== Relegation round ====
Pos	Team	Pld	W	D	L	GF	GA	GD	Pts	Qualification or relegation
11	Teplice	35	12	8	15	41	45	−4	44	
12	Mladá Boleslav	35	11	8	16	48	48	0	41	
13	Slovácko	35	9	11	15	31	56	−25	38	
14	Dukla Prague (O)	35	8	10	17	34	55	−21	34	Qualification for the relegation play-offs
15	Pardubice (O)	35	6	7	22	25	56	−31	25	Qualification for the relegation play-offs
16	České Budějovice (R)	35	0	6	29	16	86	−70	6	Relegation to FNL

Source: Chance Liga
Rules for classification: 1) Total points; 2) Points earned in regular season; 3) Head-to-head points (regular season); 4) Head-to-head goal difference (regular season); 5) Head-to-head goals scored (regular season); 5) Goal difference (all matches); 6) Goals scored (all matches); 7) Fair-play ranking; 8) Draw.
(O) Play-off winners; (R) Relegated
