= Kamil Tobiáš =

Czech football manager

Personal information
- Date of birth: 4 February 1978 (age 48)
- Place of birth: Czechoslovakia

Managerial career
- Years: Team
- 2017: Příbram
- 2018: Táborsko

Kamil Tobiáš (born 4 February 1978) is a Czech football manager, formerly in charge of Příbram in the Czech First League.

Previously working for České Budějovice and Příbram as a junior squad coach, he assumed the position of the first team manager at Příbram on 7 January 2017 after Petr Rada had been sacked as a part of the club's attempt to cut expenses. After Příbram's relegation at the end of the season, he was replaced by Josef Csaplár.

He is the son of Pavel Tobiáš, who is also a football manager.
