= 2005–06 Czech 2. Liga =

2. česká fotbalová liga
- Season: 2005–06
- Champions: Kladno
- Promoted: Kladno; Dynamo Č. Budějovice
- Relegated: Xaverov; Slavia Kroměříž; Kunovice; Pardubice; FKD; Sparta Prague "B"; Brno "B"
- Matches played: 240
- Goals scored: 559 (2.33 per match)
- Top goalscorer: Petr Faldyna (19)
- Average attendance: 854

The 2005–06 Czech 2. Liga was the 13th season of the 2. česká fotbalová liga, the second tier of the Czech football league.

== Team changes ==
=== From 2. Liga ===
Promoted to Czech First League

- FK SIAD Most
- FC Vysočina Jihlava
- FC Viktoria Plzeň

Relegated to Bohemian Football League

- FK Tatran Prachatice
- Bohemians 1905

=== To 2. Liga ===
Relegated from Czech First League

- FK Drnovice
- SK České Budějovice
- SFC Opava

Promoted from Bohemian Football League

- SC Xaverov

Promoted from Moravian-Silesian Football League

- FC Hlučín

== League standings ==
Pos	Team	Pld	W	D	L	GF	GA	GD	Pts	Promotion or relegation
1	Kladno (C, P)	30	17	6	7	45	21	+24	57	Promotion to 2006–07 1. Liga
2	Dynamo České Budějovice (P)	30	17	4	9	55	26	+29	55	Promotion to 2006–07 1. Liga
3	Ústí nad Labem	30	14	7	9	47	39	+8	49 (Note: UST 3–0 HRA; HRA 1–3 UST)	
4	Hradec Králové	30	13	10	7	31	28	+3	49	
5	Viktoria Žižkov	30	12	10	8	42	33	+9	46	
6	HFK Olomouc	30	9	14	7	27	31	−4	41	
7	Xaverov (R)	30	11	7	12	40	35	+5	40	(Note: Xaverov sold their license to play in the league for the next season to Bohemians 1905 and thus played in a lower division the following season.)
8	Slavia Kroměříž (R)	30	10	9	11	32	36	−4	39	Relegation to 2006–07 Divize E (Note: Slavia Kroměříž sold their license to play in the league for the next season to SFC Opava and thus played in a lower division the following season.)
9	Vítkovice	30	9	9	12	26	33	−7	36 (Note: VIT 1–1 HLU; HLU 0–1 VIT)	
10	Hlučín	30	10	6	14	31	47	−16	36	
11	Kunovice (R)	30	9	8	13	35	43	−8	35	(Note: Kunovice and FKD did not apply for a license for the following season.)
12	Pardubice (R)	30	9	7	14	35	38	−3	34 (Note: PAR: 9 pts; SIG: 8 pts > GD 6-6; FKD: 8 pts > GD 6-12; SPA: 6 pts)	Relegation to 2006–07 5. Liga (Note: Pardubice sold their license to play in the league for the next season to FK Baník Sokolov and thus played in a lower division the following season.)
13	Sigma Olomouc B	30	9	7	14	33	40	−7	34	
14	FKD (R)	30	7	13	10	24	40	−16	34	
15	Sparta Prague B (R)	30	8	10	12	32	37	−5	34	Relegation to 2006–07 ČFL
16	Brno B (R)	30	7	11	12	24	32	−8	32	Relegation to 2006–07 MSFL

Source: The Football Association of the Czech Republic
Rules for classification: 1) points; 2) head-to-head points; 3) head-to-head goal difference; 4) head-to-head goals scored; 5) goal difference; 6) number of goals scored.
(C) Champions; (P) Promoted; (R) Relegated

== Top goalscorers ==
Rank	Scorer	Club	Goals
1	(Czech Republic) Petr Faldyna	Dynamo Č. Budějovice	19
2	(Czech Republic) Radek Bukač	Viktoria Žižkov	11
2	(Czech Republic) Pavel Veleba	Kladno	11
4	(Czech Republic) Vítězslav Brožík	Ústí nad Labem	10
4	(Czech Republic) Václav Mrkvička	Dynamo Č. Budějovice	10
6	(Czech Republic) Josef Galbavý	Kladno	9
6	(Czech Republic) Ivo Táborský	Dynamo Č. Budějovice	9
6	(Czech Republic) Martin Vozábal	Dynamo Č. Budějovice	9
9	(Czech Republic) Vladimír Bálek	Xaverov	8
9	(Czech Republic) Martin Dombi	Hlučín	8
9	(Czech Republic) Petr Fousek	Ústí nad Labem	8
9	(Czech Republic) Jiří Mlika	Pardubice	8
9	(Czech Republic) Karel Poborský	Dynamo Č. Budějovice	8

== See also ==
- 2005–06 Czech First League
- 2005–06 Czech Cup
