= Radek Bukač =

Czech footballer

Personal information
- Date of birth: 12 June 1981 (age 45)
- Place of birth: Czechoslovakia
- Height: 1.87 m (6 ft 2 in)
- Position: Forward

Senior career*
Years	Team	Apps	(Gls)
2005	Dukla Banská Bystrica		
2006–2011	Viktoria Žižkov	20	(3)
2009	→ Hradec Králové (loan)	8	(0)
2010–2011	→ Vlašim (loan)	14	(2)
- * Club domestic league appearances and goals as of 30 June 2011

Radek Bukač (born 12 June 1981) is a professional Czech football player who played Gambrinus liga football for Viktoria Žižkov. He was among the top scorers in the 2005–06 Czech 2. Liga.
