= Nneka Ede =

Nigerian entrepreneur

- Born: Dorothy Nneka Ede; 16 May 1982 (age 44); Nigeria
- Occupation: entrepreneur

Nneka Ede (born 16 May 1982) is a Nigerian entrepreneur. Dorothy Nneka Ede is a British-Nigerian entrepreneur renowned for becoming the first African woman to own a European football club after acquiring the Portuguese third-division team, Lusitano Ginásio Clube, in 2020.

== Career ==
She was alleged to have bought Portuguese club Lusitano G.C., but acted on behalf of a company, making her the first Nigerian woman reported to own a European football club. She stated, “I am excited about this opportunity and I hope that this new chapter will deepen the already great sporting relations between Nigeria and Portugal, continue with the rich history of Lusitano club, and provide a pathway for young talent to develop and shine through.”

She was also mentioned as a potential bidder for Czech football club SK Dynamo České Budějovice. The club's then-owner signed a contract with investors represented by Nigerian businesswoman Nneka Ede.

The club later announced the completion of the share transfer and confirmed the international investment group—on whose behalf Nneka Ede acted—as the new investor. Some other sources allege she was in fact the real owner. On 1 August 2025, club new owner representatives, representatives of the city České Budějovice and South Bohemian Region met, Nneka Ede introduced herself as the only owner of the club.
