= Pavel Tobiáš =

Czech footballer and manager (born 1955)

Personal information
- Date of birth: 10 January 1955 (age 71)
- Place of birth: České Budějovice, Czechoslovakia
- Position: Defender

Youth career
- 1965–1971: Sokol Včelná
- 1971–1974: Škoda České Budějovice

Senior career*
Years	Team	Apps	(Gls)
1974–1975	Dukla Tábor		
1975–1976	VTJ Slaný		
1976–1986	České Budějovice		

Managerial career
- 1993–1997: České Budějovice
- 1997–1998: Slavia Prague
- 1998–2000: České Budějovice
- 2000–2001: Brno
- 2002–2004: České Budějovice
- 2004–2006: Příbram
- 2008–2009: České Budějovice
- 2014–2016: Příbram
- * Club domestic league appearances and goals

Pavel Tobiáš (born 10 January 1955) is a Czech football manager and former player.

Tobiáš coached several Czech football clubs, including Slavia Prague. Most often however, he led Dynamo České Budějovice, a club from his hometown.

His son, Kamil Tobiáš, is also a football manager.
