= Petr Buchta =

Czech footballer

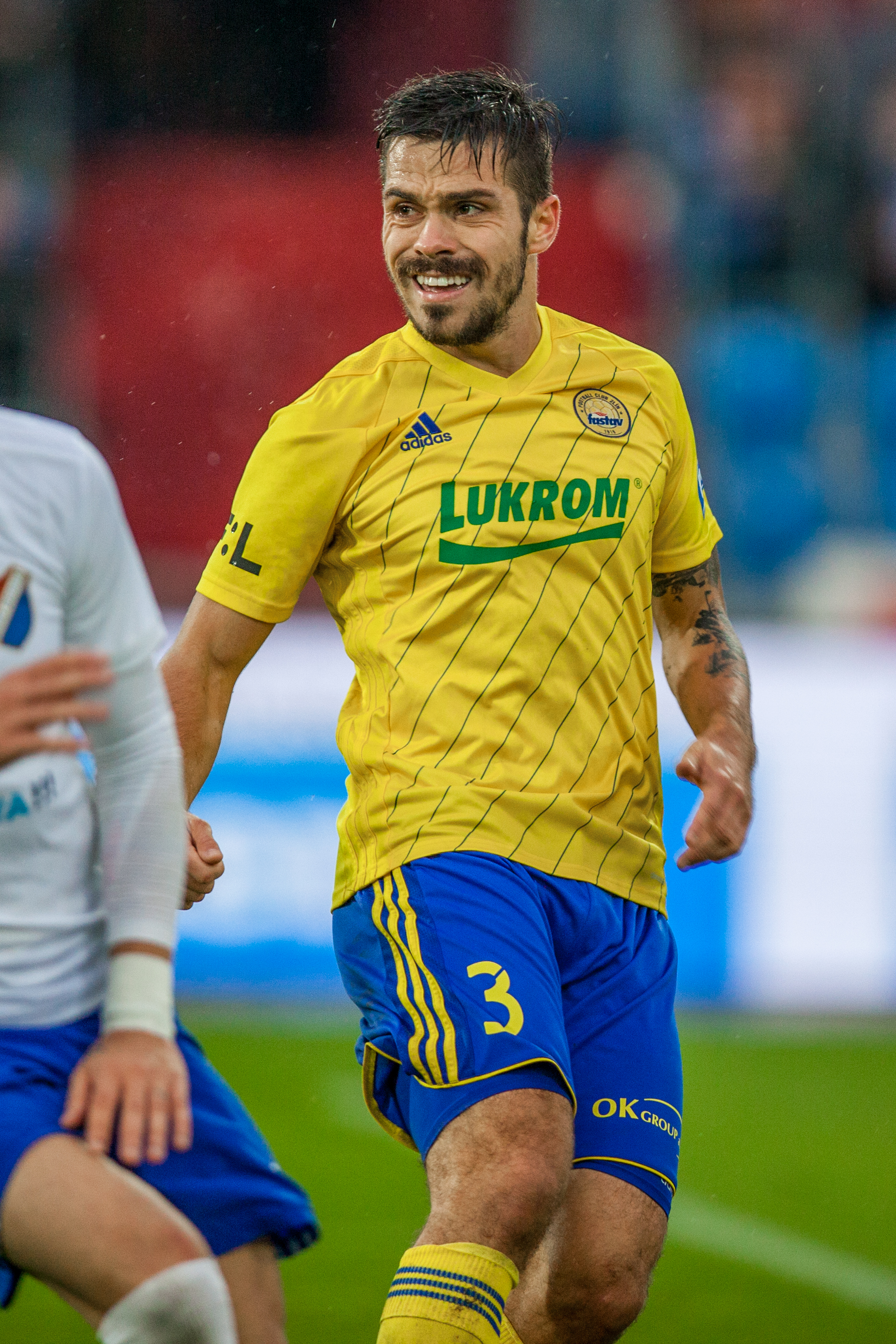

Personal information
- Date of birth: 15 July 1992 (age 34)
- Place of birth: Brno, Czechoslovakia
- Height: 1.85 m (6 ft 1 in)
- Position: Centre-back

Team information
- Current team: Sokol Lanžhot

Youth career
- −2010: Zbrojovka Brno

Senior career*
Years	Team	Apps	(Gls)
2010−2012	Zbrojovka Brno B	27	(0)
2011−2016	Zbrojovka Brno	93	(3)
2016−2017	Bohemians 1905	13	(0)
2017−2018	Jihlava	12	(0)
2018−2021	Fastav Zlín	95	(2)
2021−2022	MFK Karviná	31	(3)
2022−2024	GKS Tychy	30	(0)
2024−2025	Sandecja Nowy Sącz	21	(1)
2025−	Sokol Lanžhot	0	(0)

International career
2013	Czech Republic U21	1	(0)
- * Club domestic league appearances and goals as of 14:58, 8 June 2025 (UTC)

Petr Buchta (born 15 July 1992) is a Czech professional footballer who plays as a centre-back for Czech Fourth Division club Sokol Lanžhot.

== Honours ==
Sandecja Nowy Sącz

- III liga, group IV: 2024–25
- Polish Cup (Nowy Sącz regionals): 2024–25
