= Kim Seung-bin =

South Korean footballer (born 2000)

- Kim in 2026

Personal information
- Date of birth: 28 December 2000 (age 25)
- Place of birth: South Korea
- Height: 1.73 m (5 ft 8 in)
- Position: Attacking midfielder

Team information
- Current team: Bucheon FC 1995
- Number: 71

Youth career
- 2016–2018: Eonnam High School
- 2019: Dukla Prague

Senior career*
Years	Team	Apps	(Gls)
2019–2022	Dukla Prague	58	(9)
2023–2025	Slovácko	68	(6)
2026–	Bucheon	6	(0)
Korean name
Hangul	김승빈
RR	Gim Seungbin
MR	Kim Sŭngbin
- * Club domestic league appearances and goals as of 4 August 2026

Kim Seung-bin (Korean: 김승빈; born 28 December 2000) is a South Korean footballer who plays as an attacking midfielder for Bucheon FC 1995.

== Career ==
Kim came to FK Dukla Prague in 2019 within the framework of a sports project. After starting in the youth team, he started playing for the senior B-team in the 2019–20 season. In the 2020–21 season, he became a stable part of the Dukla Prague A-team, playing in the Czech National Football League as a forward. He scored 9 goals in 58 league games.

At the end of 2022, he transferred to 1. FC Slovácko in the Czech First League. He moved from the forward position to the midfielder position.

In 2023, he played regularly for Slovácko and became the first Korean player to establish himself in the Czech First League.

In January 2026, Kim transferred to Bucheon FC 1995 to complete his mandatory military service in his home country.
