= Marco Túlio (footballer, born May 1998) =

Brazilian association football player

Personal information
- Full name: Marco Túlio de Paula Medeiros
- Date of birth: 31 May 1998 (age 28)
- Place of birth: Belo Horizonte, Brazil
- Height: 1.83 m (6 ft 0 in)
- Position: Left-back

Team information
- Current team: Kladno
- Number: 12

Youth career
- –2017: Atlético Mineiro
- 2017: TuS Bövinghausen

Senior career*
Years	Team	Apps	(Gls)
2017–2019	Vlašim	13	(0)
2019–2021	Mladá Boleslav	37	(1)
2021	Podbeskidzie	10	(0)
2021–2022	Karviná	24	(2)
2023	Salamanca	10	(2)
2023–2024	Marbella	25	(0)
2024–2026	Hapoel Acre	23	(1)
2026	Zápy	16	(7)
2026–	Kladno	4	(0)
- * Club domestic league appearances and goals as of 19 June 2026

Marco Túlio de Paula Medeiros (born 31 May 1998), known as Marco Túlio, is a Brazilian professional footballer who plays as a left-back.

== Club career ==
Túlio started his career with Atlético Mineiro and after a spell with German side TuS Bövinghausen, he moved to the Czech Republic to first join Czech National Football League side Vlašim before joining Czech First League side Mladá Boleslav in January 2019. In February 2021, Túlio joined Ekstraklasa side Podbeskidzie on a deal until the end of the season. In August 2021, he returned to Czech football to join Karviná. In January 2023, Túlio joined Tercera Federación side Salamanca on a free transfer.

In March 2026, Túlio joined Bohemian Football League club SK Zápy.

On 14 July 2026, Túlio joined Czech National Football League club SK Kladno.
