= Jan Suchan =

Czech footballer (born 1996)

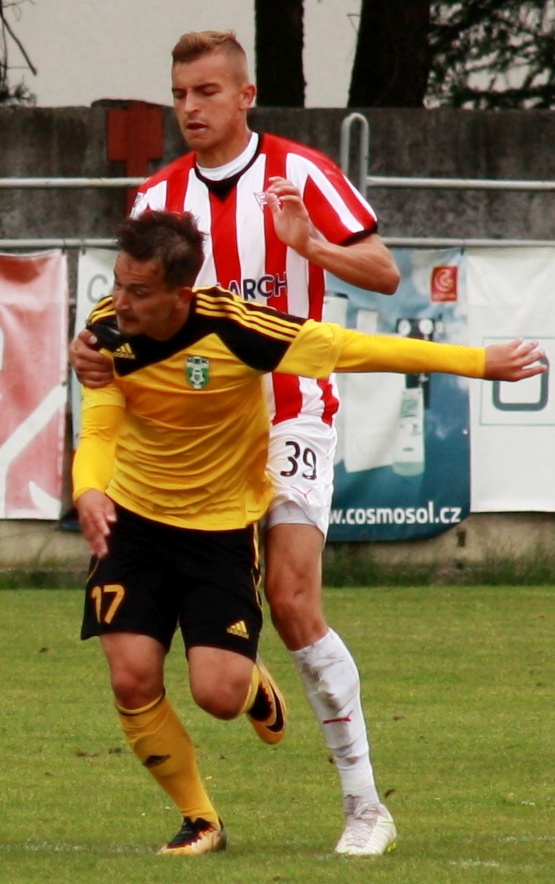
- Suchan (left) playing for MFK Karviná

Personal information
- Date of birth: 18 January 1996 (age 30)
- Place of birth: Příbram, Czech Republic
- Height: 1.79 m (5 ft 10 in)
- Position: Attacking midfielder

Team information
- Current team: Jablonec
- Number: 10

Youth career
- FK Příbram

Senior career*
Years	Team	Apps	(Gls)
2014–2015	FK Příbram	15	(2)
2015–2020	Viktoria Plzeň	0	(0)
2015–2016	→ FK Příbram (loan)	17	(1)
2017	→ FK Příbram (loan)	10	(3)
2017	→ Teplice (loan)	1	(0)
2018	→ Senica (loan)	5	(0)
2018–2019	→ Karviná (loan)	11	(0)
2019–2020	→ Vítkovice (loan)	11	(0)
2020	→ Slavoj Vyšehrad (loan)	13	(4)
2020–2022	Slavoj Vyšehrad	26	(9)
2022–2023	Vlašim	45	(24)
2023–2024	České Budějovice	34	(7)
2024–	Jablonec	34	(0)
2026	→ Slovácko (loan)	14	(3)

International career
2009–2014	Czech Republic U18	10	(1)
2014–2015	Czech Republic U19	4	(0)
2015–2017	Czech Republic U20	6	(0)
2017	Czech Republic U21	1	(0)
- * Club domestic league appearances and goals as of 25 May 2026

Jan Suchan (born 18 January 1996) is a Czech professional footballer who plays as an attacking midfielder for Jablonec.

He made his career league debut for 1. FK Příbram on 24 October 2014 in a Czech First League 3–1 home win against Baník Ostrava.

== Loan to Slovácko ==
On 12 February 2026, Suchan joined Slovácko on a half-year loan deal.
