= Roman Potočný =

Czech footballer

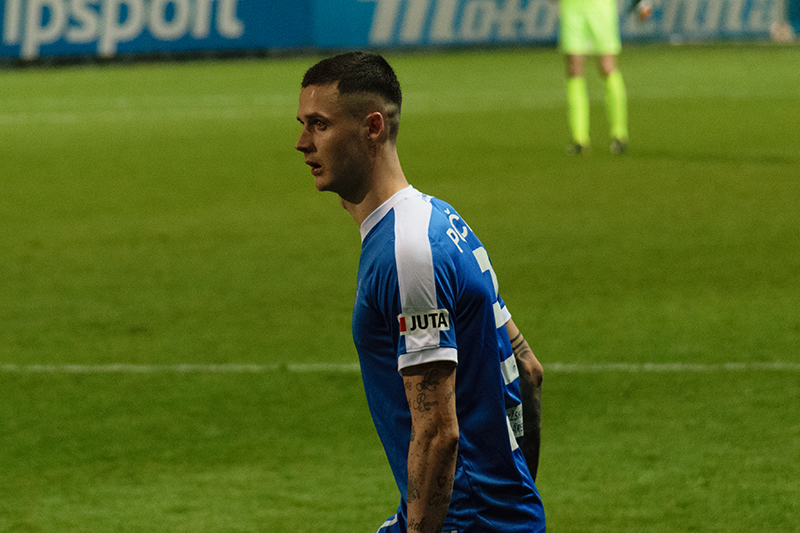

Personal information
- Date of birth: 25 April 1991 (age 35)
- Place of birth: Roudnice nad Labem, Czechoslovakia
- Height: 1.90 m (6 ft 3 in)
- Position: Forward

Team information
- Current team: Skalica
- Number: 91

Youth career
- Roudnice nad Labem
- Bohemians
- 2009: Sparta Prague
- 2009–2011: Bohemians

Senior career*
Years	Team	Apps	(Gls)
2011–2015	Bohemians 1905	6	(0)
2012	→ Roudnice nad Labem (loan)		
2013	→ Opava (loan)	7	(0)
2013–2014	→ Táborsko (loan)	6	(0)
2014	→ Sokol Brozany (loan)		
2015	→ Teplice (loan)	13	(4)
2015–2017	Teplice	39	(5)
2017–2020	Slovan Liberec	83	(20)
2020–2022	Baník Ostrava	27	(4)
2022	→ Viktoria Plzeň (loan)	2	(0)
2022–2024	Dynamo České Budějovice	30	(2)
2023–2024	→ Zbrojovka Brno (loan)	28	(8)
2024–2025	Zbrojovka Brno	15	(7)
2025	Líšeň	11	(1)
2025–	Skalica	23	(3)

International career
2020	Czech Republic	1	(0)
- * Club domestic league appearances and goals as of 21 September 2026

Roman Potočný (born 25 April 1991) is a Czech professional footballer who plays as a forward for Slovak side Skalica.

== Club career ==
He made his league debut for Bohemians on 21 May 2011 in the 1–1 Czech First League home draw against Teplice, a team he would join four years later. He scored his first goals in a professional league competition on 28 February 2015 in the 2-2 Czech First League draw against Slavia Prague.

On 31 May 2024, Potočný signed a one-year contract with Zbrojovka Brno with option.

On 21 February 2025, Potočný signed a contract with Líšeň.

== Career statistics ==
=== International ===
As of 7 September 2020

Czech Republic
Year	Apps	Goals
2020	1	0
Total	1	0
