= Kacper Zych =

Polish footballer (born 2002)

Personal information
- Full name: Kacper Roman Zych
- Date of birth: 12 May 2002 (age 24)
- Place of birth: Cieszyn, Poland
- Height: 1.90 m (6 ft 3 in)
- Position: Striker

Youth career
- 2010–2013: LKS Kończyce Małe
- 2014–2021: MFK Karviná

Senior career*
Years	Team	Apps	(Gls)
2021–2023	MFK Karviná	12	(1)
2023	→ GKS Jastrzębie (loan)	12	(2)
2023–2025	GKS Jastrzębie	42	(3)
2025–2026	Polonia Nysa	10	(0)

International career
2021	Poland U20	1	(0)
- * Club domestic league appearances and goals as of 17:10, 4 June 2026 (UTC)

Kacper Roman Zych (born 12 May 2002) is a Polish professional footballer who plays as a striker.

== Career statistics ==
As of match played 17 May 2026

Appearances and goals by club, season and competition
Club	Season	League			National cup (Note: Includes Czech Cup, Polish Cup)		Europe		Other		Total	
Club	Season	Division	Apps	Goals	Apps	Goals	Apps	Goals	Apps	Goals	Apps	Goals
MFK Karviná	2020–21	Czech First League	3	0	0	0	—		—		3	0
MFK Karviná	2021–22	Czech First League	8	1	0	0	—		—		8	1
MFK Karviná	2022–23	Czech NFL	1	0	1	0	—		—		2	0
MFK Karviná	Total		12	1	1	0	—		—		13	1
GKS Jastrzębie (loan)	2022–23	II liga	12	2	—		—		—		12	2
GKS Jastrzębie	2023–24	II liga	23	1	0	0	—		—		23	1
GKS Jastrzębie	2024–25	II liga	19	2	1	0	—		—		20	2
GKS Jastrzębie	Total		54	5	1	0	—		—		55	5
Polonia Nysa	2025–26	III liga, group III	10	0	—		—		—		10	0
Career total			76	6	2	0	—		—		78	6
