= Marcel Čermák =

Czech footballer

Personal information
- Date of birth: 25 November 1998 (age 27)
- Place of birth: Prague, Czech Republic
- Height: 1.77 m (5 ft 10 in)
- Position: Midfielder

Team information
- Current team: Teplice

Youth career
- –2018: Slavia Prague

Senior career*
Years	Team	Apps	(Gls)
2017–2018	→ Viktoria Žižkov (loan)	38	(3)
2019–2021	Aluminij	43	(0)
2021–2022	Příbram	35	(2)
2023–2025	Dynamo České Budějovice	67	(6)
2025–2026	Dukla Prague	48	(7)
2026–	Teplice	0	(0)

International career
2015	Czech Republic U17	3	(0)
- * Club domestic league appearances and goals as of 15 May 2026

Marcel Čermák (born 25 November 1998) is a Czech professional footballer who plays as a midfielder for Teplice.

== Career ==
At the age of 17, Čermák trialed for Dutch top flight side PEC Zwolle.

In 2017, he was sent on loan to Viktoria Žižkov in the Czech second division from the youth academy of Slavia Prague, one of the Czech Republic's most successful clubs.

In 2019, he signed for Aluminij in Slovenia.

On 2 January 2023, Čermák returned to his native Czech Republic to join Dynamo České Budějovice on a contract until June 2025.

On 16 January 2025, Čermák signed a contract with Dukla Prague until 2027.

On 30 June 2026, Čermák signed a multi-year contract with Teplice.
