= Tom Slončík =

Czech footballer (born 2004)

Personal information
- Date of birth: 21 December 2004 (age 21)
- Place of birth: Zlín, Czech Republic
- Height: 1.75 m (5 ft 9 in)
- Position: Attacking midfielder

Team information
- Current team: Hradec Králové

Youth career
- 2011–2022: Zlín

Senior career*
Years	Team	Apps	(Gls)
2022–2024	Zlín	46	(7)
2024–2026	Viktoria Plzeň	16	(2)
2025	→ Hradec Králové (loan)	15	(2)
2025	→ Hradec Králové (loan)	13	(6)
2026–	Hradec Králové	0	(0)

International career^{‡}
2022–2023	Czech Republic U19	10	(1)
2023–	Czech Republic U20	11	(2)
2024–	Czech Republic U21	3	(0)
- * Club domestic league appearances and goals as of 27 May 2026 ‡ National team caps and goals as of 8 August 2025

Tom Slončík (born 21 December 2004) is a Czech professional footballer who plays as a midfielder for Hradec Králové.

== Club career ==
Born in Zlín, Slončík is a youth product of FC Zlín, where he made his professional debut with Zlín in a 3–2 Czech First League loss to Sparta Prague on 25 February 2023.

He soon became one of the leading players of his club despite his young age.

In the summer 2024, he signed for Viktoria Plzeň, one of the biggest teams in the Czech First League.

In January 2025, Slončík left for a six-month loan to Hradec Králové.

On 20 August 2025, Slončík joined Hradec Králové on a loan deal again.

On 24 June 2026, Slončík joined Hradec Králové on a permanent transfer.

== International career ==
He is a youth international for the Czech Republic, having played for the U19, U20 and U21 teams.
