= Lukáš Čmelík =

Slovak footballer

Personal information
- Full name: Lukáš Čmelík
- Date of birth: 13 April 1996 (age 30)
- Place of birth: Žilina, Slovakia
- Height: 1.83 m (6 ft 0 in)
- Positions: Forward; winger

Team information
- Current team: Hradec Králové
- Number: 9

Youth career
- Žilina

Senior career*
Years	Team	Apps	(Gls)
2012–2017	Žilina	49	(11)
2016	→ Sion (loan)	0	(0)
2017	→ Piast Gliwice (loan)	2	(0)
2017–2020	DAC Dunajská Streda	38	(1)
2020–2023	Karviná	39	(4)
2022–2023	→ České Budějovice (loan)	31	(5)
2023–	Hradec Králové	44	(4)

International career
2012	Slovakia U16		
2012–2013	Slovakia U17	4	(0)
2013–2014	Slovakia U19	6	(2)
2015–2017	Slovakia U21	2	(0)
- * Club domestic league appearances and goals as of 27 May 2026

Lukáš Čmelík (born 13 April 1996) is a Slovak professional footballer who plays as a forward for Hradec Králové.

== Club career ==
He made his debut for Žilina on 17 November 2012 in a league match against Ružomberok, coming on as an '80 minute substitute for Milan Škriniar, in a 0-1 away loss.

After loans in Switzerland and Poland he had settled in DAC Dunajská Streda. Overall, he made 38 league appearances for the club, scoring a single goal against iClinic Sereď, during a 5:0 away victory in April 2019, following a pass by Kristopher Vida. He also scored three goals in six Slovnaft Cup games, but all were against lower division clubs. He also represented DAC in 4 Europa League qualifiers against Cracovia and Asteras Tripolis.
