= Jakub Kučera =

Czech footballer

Personal information
- Date of birth: 28 January 1997 (age 29)
- Place of birth: Brno, Czech Republic
- Height: 1.84 m (6 ft 0 in)
- Position: Midfielder

Team information
- Current team: FC Hradec Králové
- Number: 28

Youth career
- −2016: Zbrojovka Brno

Senior career*
Years	Team	Apps	(Gls)
2016−2018	Zbrojovka Brno	1	(0)
2016−2017	→ Blansko (loan)	21	(2)
2017–2018	→ Vítkovice (loan)	23	(2)
2018–2019	Znojmo	16	(0)
2020–2022	Líšeň	49	(6)
2022–	FC Hradec Králové	120	(13)

International career
2015	Czech Republic U-18	5	(0)
2015	Czech Republic U-19	2	(0)
- * Club domestic league appearances and goals as of 27 May 2026

Jakub Kučera (born 28 January 1997) is a Czech football player who currently plays for FC Hradec Králové.

== Club career ==
=== FC Zbrojovka Brno ===
He made his professional debut for Zbrojovka Brno against Dukla Praha on 19 March 2016, where he came in the game as a substitute for Milan Lutonský in the 88th minute.
