= Ondřej Mihálik =

Czech footballer

Personal information
- Date of birth: 2 April 1997 (age 29)
- Place of birth: Jablonec nad Nisou, Czech Republic
- Height: 1.87 m (6 ft 2 in)
- Position: Striker

Team information
- Current team: Hradec Králové
- Number: 17

Youth career
- Jablonec

Senior career*
Years	Team	Apps	(Gls)
2014–2018	Jablonec	53	(14)
2015	→ Vlašim (loan)	4	(0)
2018–2020	Jong AZ	23	(4)
2018–2020	AZ	2	(0)
2019–2020	→ Viktoria Plzeň (loan)	23	(4)
2020–2022	Viktoria Plzeň	6	(0)
2021–2022	→ České Budějovice (loan)	6	(1)
2022–2024	Slovácko	53	(6)
2024–	Hradec Králové	53	(12)

International career^{‡}
2012–2013	Czech Republic U16	13	(1)
2013–2014	Czech Republic U17	16	(2)
2014–2015	Czech Republic U18	7	(3)
2015–	Czech Republic U19	8	(3)
2016–2017	Czech Republic U20	5	(1)
2017-2019	Czech Republic U21	7	(1)
- * Club domestic league appearances and goals as of 27 May 2026 ‡ National team caps and goals as of 17 April 2019

Ondřej Mihálik (born 2 April 1997) is a Czech professional footballer who plays as a striker for Hradec Králové.

== Career ==
Mihálik made his career league debut for Jablonec on 13 September 2014 in a 4–1 away win at 1. FK Příbram.

He made a winter move away from FK Jablonec in January 2018 to AZ Alkmaar signing with the club until 2022 on a 4.5-year deal.

He was loaned to Viktoria Plzeň on a season-long loan with an option to purchase, in July 2019. In June 2020 Míhálik signed a contract with Viktoria Plzeň on a three-year deal.

On 19 June 2024, Mihálik signed a three-year contract with Hradec Králové.

== Personal life ==
On 27 February 2020 his child Tádo was born.
