= Martin Sladký =

Czech footballer

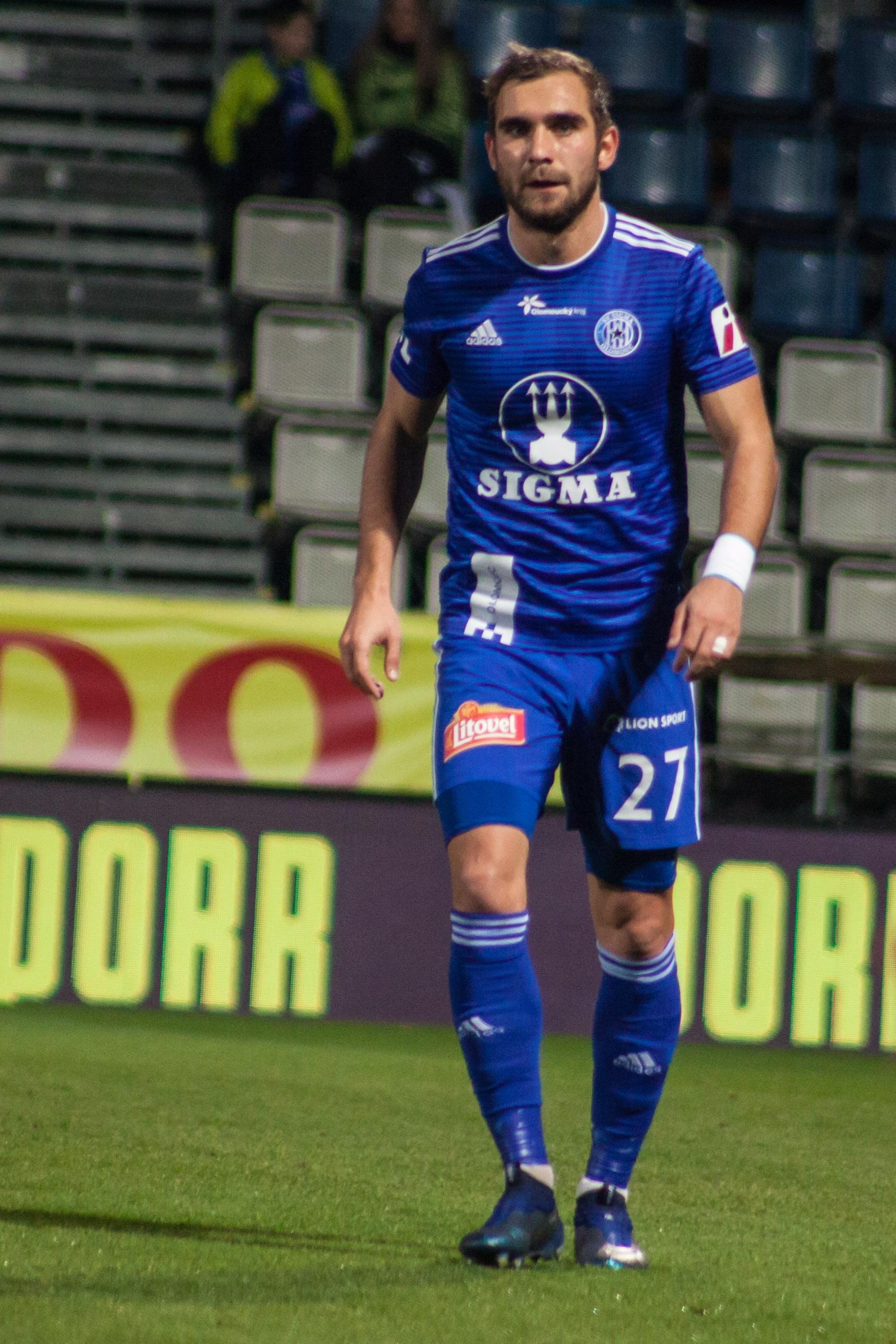
- Martin Sladký with Sigma Olomouc (2018)

Personal information
- Full name: Martin Sladký
- Date of birth: 1 March 1992 (age 34)
- Place of birth: Domažlice, Czechoslovakia
- Height: 1.80 m (5 ft 11 in)
- Position: Midfielder

Senior career*
Years	Team	Apps	(Gls)
2010–2016	Viktoria Plzeň	2	(0)
2012	→ FK Táborsko (loan)	10	(1)
2013	→ FK Táborsko (loan)	13	(0)
2016–2021	Sigma Olomouc	103	(7)
2021–2024	České Budějovice	59	(1)
2022	→ Mladá Boleslav (loan)	8	(0)

International career^{‡}
2010–2011	Czech Republic U19	8	(3)

Managerial career
- 2023–2024: České Budějovice (women, wu19)
- 2024–: České Budějovice B
- * Club domestic league appearances and goals as of 1 July 2024 ‡ National team caps and goals as of 24 May 2011

Martin Sladký (born 1 March 1992) is a Czech former professional footballer who played as a midfielder for SK Dynamo České Budějovice.
