= Dávid Šípoš =

Slovak footballer

Personal information
- Full name: Dávid Šípoš
- Date of birth: 14 August 1998 (age 28)
- Place of birth: Topoľčany, Slovakia
- Height: 1.89 m (6 ft 2 in)
- Position: Goalkeeper

Team information
- Current team: MŠK Žilina
- Number: 31

Youth career
- 2004–2011: Topvar Topoľčany
- 2011–2018: Nitra

Senior career*
Years	Team	Apps	(Gls)
2016–2021	Nitra	59	(0)
2021–2024	Dynamo České Budějovice	43	(0)
2024–2026	FC Košice	34	(0)
2026-	MŠK Žilina	8	(0)

International career^{‡}
2016	Slovakia U18	4	(0)
- Slovakia U20
2019–2020	Slovakia U21	6	(0)
- * Club domestic league appearances and goals as of 21 September 2026 ‡ National team caps and goals as of 17 November 2020

Dávid Šípoš (born 14 August 1998) is a Slovak footballer who plays for MŠK Žilina and previously appeared for Slovak U21 team as a goalkeeper.

== Club career ==
=== FC Nitra ===
Šípoš made his Fortuna Liga debut for Nitra against Ružomberok on 26 February 2018. He had kept a clean sheet in the goal-less tie.

== International career ==
Šípoš was first recognised in a Slovak senior national team nomination in September 2022 as an alternate goalkeeper in premier nomination of Francesco Calzona ahead of two 2022–23 UEFA Nations League C fixtures against Azerbaijan and Belarus. He remained absent in any position from subsequent nomination for November friendlies or December prospective national team players' training camp.
