= Michal Škoda =

Czech footballer

Personal information
- Date of birth: 1 March 1988 (age 38)
- Place of birth: Prague, Czechoslovakia
- Height: 1.91 m (6 ft 3 in)
- Position: Winger

Youth career
- ČAFC Prague
- Bohemians
- Viktorie Jirny

Senior career*
Years	Team	Apps	(Gls)
2010–2012	Bohemians Praha	41	(8)
2012–2019	Zbrojovka Brno	107	(30)
2013	→ Líšeň (loan)	2	(0)
2013–2014	→ Viktoria Žižkov (loan)	19	(2)
2014–2015	→ České Budějovice (loan)	23	(3)
2017	→ Lillestrøm (loan)	13	(1)
2019–2020	Příbram	28	(7)
2020–2021	Mladá Boleslav	29	(10)
2021–2023	České Budějovice	55	(7)
2023–2024	Dukla Prague	7	(0)
- * Club domestic league appearances and goals as of 25 January 2024

Michal Škoda (born 1 March 1988 in Prague) is a Czech football.

== Personal life ==
He is younger brother of Milan Škoda.
