= Jakub Hora =

Czech footballer (born 1991)

Personal information
- Date of birth: 23 February 1991 (age 35)
- Place of birth: Most, Czechoslovakia
- Height: 1.76 m (5 ft 9 1/2 in)
- Position: Midfielder

Senior career*
Years	Team	Apps	(Gls)
2009–2010	Baník Most	30	(8)
2010–2011	→ Slavia Prague (loan)	28	(2)
2011–2013	Viktoria Plzeň	23	(1)
2013	→ České Budějovice (loan)	12	(2)
2013–2014	→ Bohemians (loan)	26	(2)
2014	→ České Budějovice (loan)	15	(4)
2015–2023	Teplice	128	(25)
2019	→ Slavia Prague (loan)	4	(1)
2020	→ Riga (loan)	24	(2)
2021	→ Podbeskidzie (loan)	16	(2)
2021–2023	→ České Budějovice (loan)	45	(2)
2023–2024	České Budějovice	10	(1)
2024–2025	Dukla Prague	42	(9)
2025–2026	Silon Táborsko	22	(0)

International career
2009–2010	Czech Republic U19	8	(0)
2012	Czech Republic U21	1	(0)
- * Club domestic league appearances and goals as of 24 May 2026

Jakub Hora (born 23 February 1991) is a Czech professional footballer who plays as a midfielder.

On 6 February 2024, Hora signed a contract with Dukla Prague until end of the season.

Hora was awarded as the player of the 2023–24 Czech National Football League season by the League Football Association.

In June 2025, Hora signed a one-year contract with Silon Táborsko with option.
