= Martin Vozábal =

Czech footballer

Personal information
- Date of birth: 8 November 1978 (age 48)
- Place of birth: Tábor, Czechoslovakia
- Height: 1.81 m (5 ft 11 in)
- Position: Midfielder

Youth career
- 1988–1993: VS Tábor
- 1993–1996: Dynamo České Budějovice

Senior career*
Years	Team	Apps	(Gls)
1996–2005	Dynamo České Budějovice	191	(19)
1999–2000	→ Slavia Prague (loan)	3	(0)
2001–2002	→ SK Hradec Králové (loan)	12	(4)
2004–2005	Skoda Xanthi	12	(0)
2005–2006	Dynamo České Budějovice	29	(9)
2006–2007	1. FC Slovácko	14	(0)
2006–2007	FK SIAD Most	13	(1)
2007–2008	Dynamo České Budějovice	26	(3)
2008–2009	FK Viktoria Žižkov	21	(4)
2009–2010	FC Tescoma Zlín	24	(4)
Total		345	(44)

International career
1997–2000	Czech Republic U-21	5	(1)
- * Club domestic league appearances and goals

Martin Vozábal (born 8 November 1978 in Tábor) is a Czech former professional footballer who played in the Gambrinus Liga for Dynamo České Budějovice. He was a participant at the 2000 Olympic Games.
