= Lukáš Bartošák =

Czech footballer

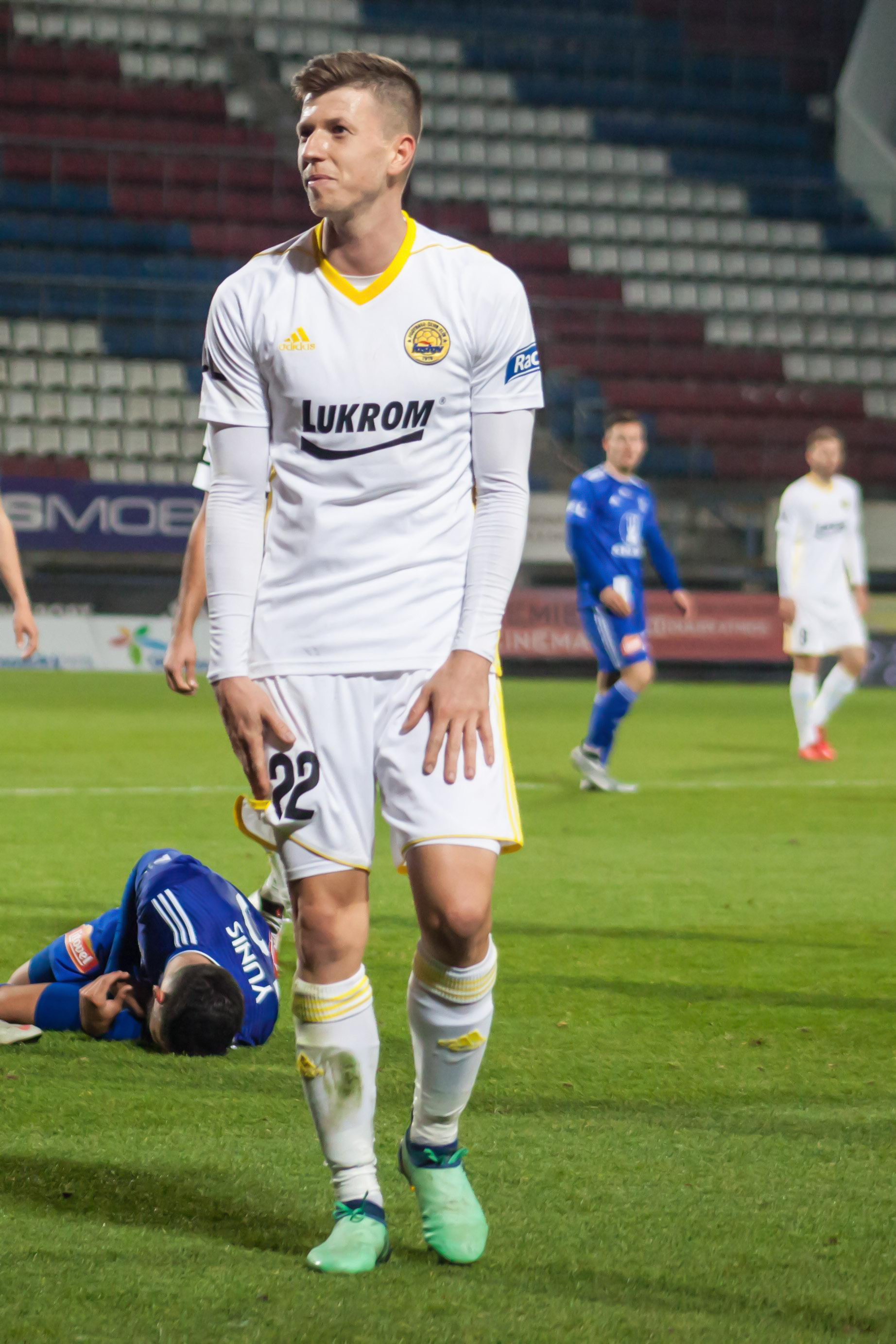
- Lukáš Bartošák with Fastav Zlín

Personal information
- Date of birth: 3 July 1990 (age 36)
- Place of birth: Brumov-Bylnice, Czechoslovakia
- Height: 1.78 m (5 ft 10 in)
- Position: Defender

Team information
- Current team: Zlín
- Number: 31

Youth career
- Elseremo Brumov

Senior career*
Years	Team	Apps	(Gls)
	Hlučín	35	(4)
2011–2012	Karviná	29	(1)
2012–2015	Viktoria Žižkov	67	(6)
2015–2017	Slovan Liberec	30	(2)
2017–2020	Fastav Zlín	75	(2)
2020–2022	Karviná	50	(4)
2022–	Zlín	97	(9)

International career^{‡}
2015	Czech Republic	1	(0)
- * Club domestic league appearances and goals as of 27 May 2026 ‡ National team caps and goals as of 21 October 2020

Lukáš Bartošák (born 3 July 1990) is a Czech professional footballer who plays as a defender for Zlín.

== Club career ==
He made his league debut on 20 March 2010 in FC Hlučín's 1-1 Czech National Football League home draw against Vysočina Jihlava. He scored his first league goal on 1 May 2010 in Hlučín's 3–3 away draw against Baník Sokolov. He signed for Liberec of the Czech First League in 2015, playing 30 league matches and scoring two goals. He moved to Zlín in 2017.

== International career ==
Although Bartošák had not represented the Czech Republic on any youth level, he was reportedly contacted by the Czech Republic national team officials about joining the senior squad for the matches against Serbia and Poland in November 2015, should David Limberský fail to recover from his injury in time. He was officially called up to the national squad on 9 November 2015. He made his national team debut on 17 November 2015 in a 3–1 friendly match defeat against Poland at Stadion Miejski, Wrocław.
