= Lukáš Havel (footballer) =

Czech footballer (born 1996)

Personal information
- Date of birth: 6 June 1996 (age 30)
- Place of birth: České Budějovice, Czech Republic
- Height: 1.86 m (6 ft 1 in)
- Position: Centre-back

Team information
- Current team: Silon Táborsko
- Number: 2

Youth career
- 2003–2015: České Budějovice

Senior career*
Years	Team	Apps	(Gls)
2015–2024	České Budějovice	186	(27)
2015	→ Písek (loan)		
2016	→ Malše Roudné (loan)		
2024–2025	Teplice	4	(0)
2024–2025	Teplice B	13	(1)
2025–	Silon Táborsko	27	(4)
- * Club domestic league appearances and goals as of 24 May 2026

Lukáš Havel (born 6 June 1996) is a Czech professional footballer who plays as a centre-back for Silon Táborsko.

== Life ==
Havel was born on 6 June 1996 in České Budějovice. He is the grandson of Adolf Havel, a member of SK Dynamo České Budějovice Hall of Fame who played for the club in the 1970s and then led all age categories in České Budějovice as a coach.

== Club career ==
Havel has been playing for Dynamo České Budějovice since the age of six. He gradually went through all the youth teams and, with the exception of short loan spells in the lower amateur leagues in 2015 and 2016, when he played for FC Písek and Malše Roudné, he did not play for any other club. He made his senior league debut for České Budějovice on 28 May 2016 in their Czech National Football League 2–4 home loss against Vlašim and also scored his first goal in senior football. In the 2018–19 season, České Budějovice was promoted to the Czech First League and Havel made his first league debut on 14 July 2019 in the 0–1 home loss against Opava.

On 3 April 2023, in a match against Zlín, Havel was shown a red card forty seconds into the game, one of the fastest red cards in league history and the fastest in club history. Before the 2023–24 season, he became the club's captain. As of December 2023, he played over 120 matches in the first league for České Budějovice and scored 14 goals, which ranks him in the club's top 10 in both indicators.

On 20 August 2024, Havel signed a two-year contract with Teplice.

On 1 July 2025, Havel signed a contract with Silon Táborsko.
