= Patrik Hellebrand =

Czech footballer

Personal information
- Full name: Patrik Hellebrand
- Date of birth: 16 May 1999 (age 27)
- Place of birth: Opava, Czech Republic
- Height: 1.80 m (5 ft 11 in)
- Position: Central midfielder

Team information
- Current team: Korona Kielce
- Number: 18

Youth career
- 2003–2005: Rapid Bratislava
- 2005–2017: Zlín

Senior career*
Years	Team	Apps	(Gls)
2017	Zlín	1	(0)
2017–2020	Slovácko	22	(1)
2020–2022	Slavia Prague	10	(0)
2020–2021	→ Slovácko (loan)	7	(0)
2021	→ Opava (loan)	17	(0)
2021–2022	→ České Budějovice (loan)	15	(0)
2022–2024	České Budějovice	70	(4)
2024–2026	Górnik Zabrze	65	(6)
2026–	Korona Kielce	0	(0)

International career^{‡}
2014	Czech Republic U16	1	(0)
2016	Czech Republic U17	2	(0)
2016–2017	Czech Republic U18	7	(0)
2018	Czech Republic U19	3	(0)
2019	Czech Republic U20	4	(2)
2025–	Czech Republic	1	(0)
- * Club domestic league appearances and goals as of 19:29, 29 May 2026 (UTC) ‡ National team caps and goals as of 11:20, 14 November 2025 (UTC)

Patrik Hellebrand (born 16 May 1999) is a Czech professional footballer who plays as a central midfielder for Ekstraklasa club Korona Kielce and the Czech Republic national team.

== Club career ==
He made his senior league debut for Zlín on 20 May 2017 in their 1–0 away loss at Dukla Prague, his only league match for the team. Upon the end of his youth contract in 2017, Hellebrand signed a professional contract with Zlín's regional rivals Slovácko.

On 20 May 2024, Hellebrand agreed to join Polish club Górnik Zabrze as a free agent in July 2024 on a three-year deal. In the 2025–26 season, he made 39 appearances across all competitions, recording four goals and two assists, as Górnik finished as runners-up in the Ekstraklasa and won the Polish Cup.

On 16 June 2026, Hellebrand made a surprise move to fellow Ekstraklasa club Korona Kielce, who finished the previous season in 11th place, after his €1.7 million release clause was triggered. He signed a three-year contract with an option for another year.

== Career statistics ==
=== Club ===
As of match played 23 May 2026

Appearances and goals by club, season and competition
Club	Season	League			National cup (Note: Includes Czech Cup, Polish Cup)		Continental		Other		Total	
Club	Season	Division	Apps	Goals	Apps	Goals	Apps	Goals	Apps	Goals	Apps	Goals
Zlín	2016–17	Czech First League	1	0	—		—		—		1	0
Slovácko	2017–18	Czech First League	6	0	2	0	—		—		8	0
Slovácko	2018–19	Czech First League	5	0	2	1	—		—		7	1
Slovácko	2019–20	Czech First League	11	1	3	0	—		—		14	1
Slovácko	Total		22	1	7	1	—		—		29	2
Slavia Prague	2019–20	Czech First League	10	0	—		—		—		10	0
Slovácko (loan)	2020–21	Czech First League	7	0	1	0	—		—		8	0
Opava (loan)	2020–21	Czech First League	17	0	0	0	—		—		17	0
České Budějovice	2021–22	Czech First League	21	0	3	1	—		—		24	1
České Budějovice	2022–23	Czech First League	30	2	5	0	—		—		35	2
České Budějovice	2023–24	Czech First League	34	2	3	0	—		—		37	2
České Budějovice	Total		85	4	11	1	—		—		96	5
Górnik Zabrze	2024–25	Ekstraklasa	32	2	1	0	—		—		33	2
Górnik Zabrze	2025–26	Ekstraklasa	33	4	6	0	—		—		39	4
Górnik Zabrze	Total		65	6	7	0	—		—		72	6
Korona Kielce	2026–27	Ekstraklasa	0	0	0	0	—		—		0	0
Career total			207	11	26	2	0	0	0	0	233	13

=== International ===
As of match played 13 November 2025

Appearances and goals by national team and year
National team	Year	Apps	Goals
Czech Republic
Czech Republic	2025	1	0
Total		1	0

== Honours ==
Slavia Prague

- Czech First League: 2019–20

Górnik Zabrze

- Polish Cup: 2025–26
