= Martin Králik =

Slovak footballer

Personal information
- Date of birth: 3 April 1995 (age 31)
- Place of birth: Prievidza, Slovakia
- Height: 1.86 m (6 ft 1 in)
- Position: Centre-back

Team information
- Current team: Mladá Boleslav
- Number: 3

Youth career
- 2002–2009: Prievidza
- 2009–2013: Žilina

Senior career*
Years	Team	Apps	(Gls)
2013–2020	Žilina	127	(7)
2020–2024	České Budějovice	127	(6)
2024–	Mladá Boleslav	58	(2)

International career
- Slovakia U16
2011	Slovakia U17	3	(0)
- Slovakia U18
2013–2014	Slovakia U19	3	(0)
2015–2017	Slovakia U21	6	(0)
2017	Slovakia	1	(0)
- * Club domestic league appearances and goals as of 27 May 2026

Martin Králik (born 3 April 1995) is a Slovak footballer who plays as a centre-back for Mladá Boleslav in Czech First League.

== Career ==
=== MŠK Žilina ===
He made his professional debut for Žilina against Nitra on 2 November 2013. The game concluded with a 0-2 result in favour of Šošoni. Králik had played for the entire match and contributed with a winning goal, following a pass from Róbert Pich.

Králik was released from MŠK Žilina, as the club had entered liquidation, due to a coronavirus pandemic.

=== Mladá Boleslav ===
On 2 July 2024, Králik signed a contract with Mladá Boleslav.

== International career ==
Králik was called up for two unofficial friendly fixtures held in Abu Dhabi, UAE, in January 2017, against Uganda and Sweden. He capped his debut against Uganda, being fielded for the entire game. Slovakia went on to lose the game 1–3. Králik, however was not fielded in a 0–6 defeat against Sweden later that week.

== Honours ==
=== MŠK Žilina ===
- Fortuna Liga: Winners: 2016-17
