= FC Silon Táborsko =

Football club

- Full name: Football Club Silon Táborsko a.s.
- Founded: 2012; 14 years ago
- Ground: Stadion v Kvapilově ulici
- Chairman: Jiří Smrž
- Manager: Miloslav Brožek
- League: Czech National Football League
- 2025–26: 2nd of 16
- Website: www.fctaborsko.cz
Home colours	Away colours

FC Silon Táborsko is a football club located in Tábor, Czech Republic. It plays in the Czech National Football League (2nd tier).

== History ==
In June 2011, FK Spartak MAS Sezimovo Ústí owner Jiří Smrž bought the rights to neighbouring team FK Tábor and at the end of 2011, the club announced that they would fusion with Tábor from 2012 on to found a new club, FC MAS Táborsko.

The club was formerly located at Soukeník stadium in nearby Sezimovo Ústí, the Stadium of the former FK Spartak MAS. Lower squads of the team, as well the youth teams still play their games there. They play now at the Stadion v Kvapilově ulici in Tábor.

In 2022, the club got a new main sponsor and changed its name to FC Silon Táborsko.

=== Historical names ===
FK Spartak MAS Sezimovo Ústí (1926–2012)

- 1926 – JPT Sezimovo Ústí (Jednota proletářské tělovýchovy Sezimovo Ústí)
- 1932 – AC Stadion Sezimovo Ústí (Atletický club Stadion Sezimovo Ústí)
- 1941 – SK MAS Sezimovo Ústí (Sportovní klub Moravské akciové strojírny Sezimovo Ústí)
- 195? – TJ Spartak MAS Sezimovo Ústí (Tělovýchovná jednota Spartak Moravské akciové strojírny Sezimovo Ústí)
- 1993 – FK Spartak MAS Sezimovo Ústí (Fotbalový klub Spartak Moravské akciové strojírny Sezimovo Ústí)

FC Táborsko (since 2012)

- 2012 – FC MAS Táborsko
- 2022 – FC Silon Táborsko

== Players ==
=== Current squad ===
As of 8 September 2026.

Note: Flags indicate national team as defined under FIFA eligibility rules; some limited exceptions apply. Players may hold more than one non-FIFA nationality.

No.	Pos.	Nation	Player
2	DF	CZE	Lukáš Havel
4	DF	NGR	John Benneth
7	DF	CZE	Martin Doubek
8	MF	CZE	Ondřej Bláha
10	DF	CZE	Petr Plachý
11	FW	CZE	Adam Toula (on loan from Viktoria Žižkov)
12	MF	CZE	Jakub Zeronik
13	MF	CZE	Jakub Barac
15	MF	CZE	Matouš Varačka
16	MF	CZE	Filip Rataj
17	DF	CZE	Michal Řezáč
18	GK	CZE	Martin Pastornický
19	DF	CZE	Petr Heppner

No.	Pos.	Nation	Player
20	FW	NGR	Ola Raji
22	MF	CZE	Jiří Kateřiňák
23	MF	UKR	Andriy Yuzvak
24	MF	CZE	Jakub Rezek
27	DF	CZE	Matouš Nikl
29	FW	CZE	Lukáš Matějka
30	FW	NGR	Abraham Benjamin
32	DF	CZE	Matyáš Poturnay (on loan from Sparta Prague)
33	DF	CZE	Matěj Slouk
41	GK	CZE	Mikuláš Kubný
55	GK	CZE	Jakub Kerbach (on loan from Bohemians 1905)
56	FW	CZE	Lukáš Hruška (on loan from Hradec Králové)
98	MF	CZE	Roman Holiš

=== Out on loan ===
Note: Flags indicate national team as defined under FIFA eligibility rules; some limited exceptions apply. Players may hold more than one non-FIFA nationality.

No. / Pos. / Nation / Player; — / MF / CZE / Tomáš Polyák (at Viktoria Žižkov)	No. / Pos. / Nation / Player; — / MF / CZE / Tomáš Hák (at Liptovský Mikuláš)

== Managers ==
- Jindřich Dejmal (2007–2009)
- Luboš Zákostelský (2009–2013)
- Roman Nádvorník (2013–2014)
- Petr Frňka (2014)
- Radim Nečas (2014–2015)
- Petr Frňka (2015–2016)
- Roman Nádvorník (2016–2018)
- Kamil Tobiáš (2018)
- Petr Mikolanda (2018–2019)
- Karel Musil (2019)
- Miloslav Brožek (2019–2021)
- Sergejs Golubevs (2021–2022)
- Radoslav Kováč (2022)
- Roman Nádvorník (2022–2024)
- Radek Kronďák (2024–2026)
- Miloslav Brožek (2026–present)

== Honours ==
- Bohemian Football League (third tier)
  - Champions: 2009–10 (as FK Spartak MAS Sezimovo Ústí)
