= Stadion Střelecký ostrov =

Football stadium in České Budějovice, Czechia

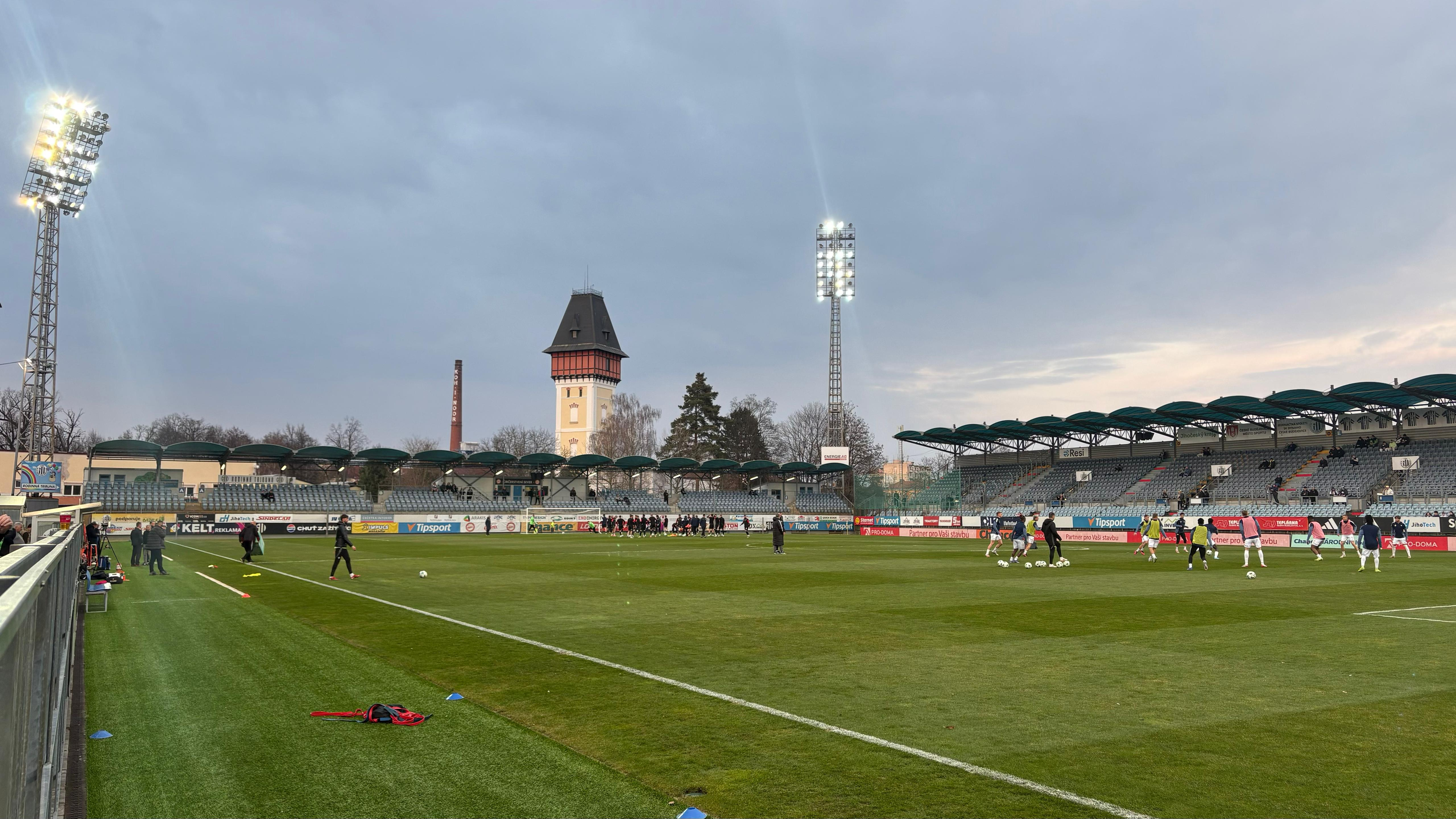
- Střelecký ostrov
- Interactive map of Stadion Střelecký ostrov
- Location: Střelecký ostrov 3/3; České Budějovice, Czech Republic, 370 21
- Coordinates: 48°58′1″N 14°28′3″E
- Owner: The city of České Budějovice
- Capacity: 6,681
- Field size: 105m x 68m

Construction
- Opened: 1940
- Renovated: 2003–2008

Tenant
- SK Dynamo České Budějovice

Stadion Střelecký ostrov is a football stadium in České Budějovice, Czech Republic, located near the Vltava River. It is currently used as the home ground of SK Dynamo České Budějovice. The stadium holds 6,681 people and was built in 1940. Before renovation in 2003 it had a capacity of 12,000 people (1,500 seated). The city and the club were however forced to reconstruct and modernize the stadium to meet the football association criteria. The stadium subsequently had an all-seated capacity of 6,681.

== International matches ==
Stadion Střelecký ostrov has hosted one competitive match of the Czech Republic national football team

29 March 2011 UEFA Euro 2012; Qualifying Group I	Czech Republic	2–0	Liechtenstein	České Budějovice, Czech Republic
17:30 CEST (UTC+02); Match 704/196	Baroš 3'; M. Kadlec 70'	UEFA Report		Stadium: Stadion Střelecký ostrov Attendance: 6,700; Referee: Hategan (Romania)
