= SK Dynamo České Budějovice =

Czech football club, based in České Budějovice

Dynamo České Budějovice
- Full name: Sportovní klub Dynamo České Budějovice a.s.
- Founded: 1900; 126 years ago
- Ground: Stadion Střelecký ostrov, České Budějovice
- Capacity: 6,681
- Owner: Nneka Ede
- Chairman: Miroslav Marković
- Manager: Nikodimos Papavasiliou
- League: Bohemian Football League
- 2025–26: 13th of 16 (relegated)
- Website: www.dynamocb.cz
Home colours	Away colours

SK Dynamo České Budějovice is a professional football club from České Budějovice, Czech Republic. The club played in the Czech First League for 24 seasons, but was relegated in 2025. From 2026, the club plays in the Bohemian Football League (the third tier of the Czech football system), after it failed to meet the conditions for obtaining a license for professional competition and was administratively relegated from the Czech National Football League.

== History ==
The club was founded in 1899 as Sportovní kroužek České Budějovice and in 1900 as Sportovní klub České Budějovice. Since 1993, the club has played in the top-level Czech First League almost exclusively. Despite suffering relegation three times, most recently in 2005, the club has won promotion back to the top-flight immediately on each occasion.

In 2002 České Budějovice celebrated promotion to the Czech First League, announcing a project to reconstruct their stadium in line with league requirements. The club celebrated its centenary in 2005 but were relegated from the top flight, vowing to return to the Czech First League a year later. In the 2005–06 Czech 2. Liga, the club started poorly, lying in 13th place in late September. A change in fortunes came about with the club signing former player and all-time leader in national team appearances Karel Poborský on loan from Sparta Prague. The club improved significantly and went on to win promotion back to the Czech First League at the end of the season.

Since 2011, České Budějovice have had an agreement where SK Strakonice 1908 operates as its farm team.

In 2023, sports researchers Michal Průcha and Zdeněk Zuntych found out from an edition of the former České Budějovice local newspaper "Budivoj" that the football club was founded in 1900. In response, the team changed the year in its logo.

In the 2024–25 season, Dynamo České Budějovice became the first club in history of the Czech First League not to win a single game and was relegated to the Czech National Football League with just six points. On 25 June 2025, an anonymous foreign investment company bought the club from lawyer Vladimír Koubek, with British-Nigerian businesswoman Nneka Ede acting as the transaction intermediary. On 1 August 2025, club new owner representatives, representatives of the city of České Budějovice and South Bohemian Region met, Nneka Ede introduced herself as the only owner of the club.

After the 2025–26 season, the club was administratively relegated to the Bohemian Football League, after it failed to meet the conditions for obtaining a license for professional competition.

== Historical names ==
- 1899 – SK České Budějovice (Sportovní kroužek České Budějovice)
- 1903 – SK Slavia České Budějovice (Sportovní klub Slavia České Budějovice)
- 1905 – SK České Budějovice (Sportovní klub České Budějovice)
- 1949 – TJ Sokol JČE České Budějovice (Tělovýchovná jednota Sokol Jihočeské elektrárny České Budějovice)
- 1951 – TJ Slavia České Budějovice (Tělovýchovná jednota Slavia České Budějovice)
- 1953 – DSO Dynamo České Budějovice (Dobrovolná sportovní organizace Dynamo České Budějovice)
- 1958 – TJ Dynamo České Budějovice (Tělovýchovná jednota Dynamo České Budějovice)
- 1991 – SK Dynamo České Budějovice (Sportovní klub Dynamo České Budějovice)
- 1992 – SK České Budějovice JČE (Sportovní klub České Budějovice Jihočeská energetická, a.s.)
- 1999 – SK České Budějovice (Sportovní klub České Budějovice, a.s.)
- 2004 – SK Dynamo České Budějovice (Sportovní klub Dynamo České Budějovice, a.s.)

== Players ==
=== Current squad ===
As of 8 August 2026

Note: Flags indicate national team as defined under FIFA eligibility rules; some limited exceptions apply. Players may hold more than one non-FIFA nationality.

No.	Pos.	Nation	Player
2	DF	FRA	Dollard Wandji
4	DF	POR	André Alves
5	DF	IRL	Gabriel Adebambo
6	DF	CZE	Jan Brabec
9	MF	CZE	Jiří Skalák
11	MF	NGA	Simon Omon

No.	Pos.	Nation	Player
12	DF	NGA	Amos Ochoche
13	FW	NGA	Chukwudi Igbokwe
14	MF	CZE	Emil Tischler
15	MF	NGA	Jude Sunday
21	MF	CZE	Martin Douděra
29	GK	CZE	Jan Volek

=== Out on loan ===
Note: Flags indicate national team as defined under FIFA eligibility rules; some limited exceptions apply. Players may hold more than one non-FIFA nationality.

No.	Pos.	Nation	Player

=== Retired numbers ===
- 8 – (Czech Republic) Karel Poborský

== Player records in the Czech First League ==
As of 25 May 2025 (after the last club's season in the Czech First League)

=== Most appearances ===
#	Name	Matches
1	(Czech Republic) David Horejš	187
2	(Czech Republic) Martin Vozábal	175
3	(Czech Republic) Roman Lengyel	162
4	(Czech Republic) Ladislav Fujdiar	140
5	(Czech Republic) Jaromír Plocek	136
6	(Czech Republic) Pavel Novák	131
6	(Czech Republic) Lukáš Havel	131
8	(Czech Republic) Karel Vácha	129
9	(Czech Republic) Zdeněk Ondrášek	128
10	(Slovakia) Martin Králik	125

=== Most goals ===
#	Name	Goals
1	(Czech Republic) Karel Vácha	38
2	(Czech Republic) Ladislav Fujdiar	31
3	(Czech Republic) Zdeněk Ondrášek	28
4	(Czech Republic) David Lafata	27
5	(Czech Republic) Jan Saidl	24
6	(Czech Republic) Tomáš Janda	17
6	(Czech Republic) Marek Kulič	17
8	(Czech Republic) Martin Vozábal	15
9	(Bosnia and Herzegovina) Benjamin Čolić	14
9	(Czech Republic) Lukáš Havel	14
9	(Czech Republic) Jakub Hora	14

=== Most clean sheets ===
#	Name	Clean sheets
1	(Czech Republic) Pavel Kučera	39
2	(Slovakia) Peter Holec	31
3	(Czech Republic) Jaroslav Drobný	22

== Managers ==
- Jiří Kotrba (1989–1991)
- Jindřich Dejmal (1992–1993)
- Pavel Tobiáš (Aug 1993 – Sept 1997)
- Zdeněk Procházka (1997–1998)
- František Cerman (1998)
- Pavel Tobiáš (Aug 1998 – May 2000)
- Jindřich Dejmal (2000 – March 2001)
- Milan Bokša (March 2001 – March 2002)
- Pavel Tobiáš (March 2002 – Oct 2004)
- Robert Žák (Oct 2004 – March 2005)
- František Cipro (April 2005 – Aug 2007)
- František Straka (July 2007 – June 2008)
- Jan Kmoch (June 2008 – Aug 2008)
- Pavel Tobiáš (July 2008 – Aug 2010)
- Jaroslav Šilhavý (Sept 2010 – June 2011)
- Jiří Kotrba (July 2011 – Sept 2011)
- František Cipro (Sep 2011 – Sept 2012)
- Miroslav Soukup (Sep 2012 – Feb 2013)
- Pavol Švantner (Feb 2013–13)
- Pavel Hoftych (2013)
- Luboš Urban (2014–15)
- František Cipro (2015)
- David Horejš (2015–2022)
- Jozef Weber (June 2022 – Oct 2022)
- Jiří Lerch (Oct 2022 – Nov 2022)
- Marek Nikl & Tomáš Zápotočný (Nov 2022 – Nov 2023)
- Tomáš Zápotočný (Nov 2023 – Dec 2023)
- Jiří Lerch (Dec 2023 – July 2024)
- František Straka (July 2024 – Jan 2025)
- Jiří Lerch (Jan 2025 – July 2025)
- Pedro Resende (July 2025 – March 2026)
- Nikodimos Papavasiliou (March 2026 – present)

== History in domestic competitions ==
- 1985–1987: Czechoslovak First League
- 1987–1991: 1. ČNL
- 1991–1993: Czechoslovak First League
- 1993–1998: Czech First League
- 1998–1999: Czech 2. Liga
- 1999–2001: Czech First League
- 2001–2002: Czech 2. Liga
- 2002–2005: Czech First League
- 2005–2006: Czech 2. Liga
- 2006–2013: Czech First League
- 2013–2014: Czech National Football League
- 2014–2015: Czech First League
- 2015–2019: Czech National Football League
- 2019–2025: Czech First League
- 2025– : Czech National Football League

- Seasons spent at Level 1 of the football league system: 26
- Seasons spent at Level 2 of the football league system: 8
- Seasons spent at Level 3 of the football league system: 0
- Seasons spent at Level 4 of the football league system: 0

=== Czechoslovakia ===
Season	League	Placed	Pld	W	D	L	GF	GA	GD	Pts	Cup
1991–92	1. liga	13th	30	7	8	15	34	59	–25	22	Quarter-finals
1992–93	1. liga	13th	30	9	5	16	36	39	–3	23	Quarter-finals

=== Czech Republic ===
Season	League	Placed	Pld	W	D	L	GF	GA	GD	Pts	Cup
1993–94	1. liga	6th	30	11	13	6	33	31	+2	35	Round of 32
1994–95	1. liga	7th	30	12	10	8	29	28	+1	46	Round of 32
1995–96	1. liga	11th	30	10	7	13	35	47	–12	37	Round of 32
1996–97	1. liga	6th	30	11	11	8	38	40	–2	44	Round of 32
1997–98	1. liga	15th	30	8	7	15	26	43	–17	31	Round of 32
1998–99	2. liga	2nd	30	22	6	2	65	18	+47	72	Round of 16
1999–00	1. liga	13th	30	9	5	16	34	49	–15	32	Second round
2000–01	1. liga	15th	30	6	8	16	32	56	–24	25	Quarter-finals
2001–02	2. liga	1st	30	20	6	4	58	20	+38	66	Second round
2002–03	1. liga	13th	30	8	6	16	36	54	–18	30	Semi-finals
2003–04	1. liga	8th	30	11	7	12	38	38	0	40	Second round
2004–05	1. liga	15th	30	6	7	17	28	39	–11	25	Round of 16
2005–06	2. liga	2nd	30	17	4	9	55	26	+29	55	Round of 16
2006–07	1. liga	10th	30	9	11	10	31	32	–1	34	Semi-finals
2007–08	1. liga	13th	30	8	8	14	27	35	–8	32	Round of 16
2008–09	1. liga	10th	30	7	15	8	30	37	–7	36	Round of 32
2009–10	1. liga	13th	30	7	10	13	24	35	–11	31	Round of 16
2010–11	1. liga	11th	30	7	12	11	30	48	–18	33	Round of 16
2011–12	1. liga	10th	30	9	8	13	30	51	–21	35	Quarter-finals
2012–13	1. liga	15th	30	7	5	18	24	49	–25	26	Second round
2013–14	2. liga	1st	30	19	5	6	57	20	+37	62	Round of 32
2014–15	1. liga	16th	30	5	7	18	29	72	–43	22	Round of 32
2015–16	2. liga	12th	28	6	14	8	41	48	–7	32	Round of 32
2016–17	2. liga	5th	30	12	10	8	39	31	+8	46	Round of 32
2017–18	2. liga	6th	30	11	11	8	44	33	+11	44	First round
2018–19	2. liga	1st	30	23	3	4	60	24	+36	72	Round of 32
2019–20	1. liga	7th	32	13	4	15	47	49	–2	43	Round of 16
2020–21	1. liga	13th	34	9	11	14	33	47	–14	38	Round of 16
2021–22	1. liga	10th	32	9	9	14	42	50	–8	36	Round of 16
2022–23	1. liga	10th	32	11	5	16	38	60	–22	38	Semi-finals
2023–24	1. liga	15th	35	7	8	20	41	70	–9	29	Round of 16
2024–25	1. liga	16th	35	0	6	29	16	86	–70	6	Round of 32
2025–26	2. liga	13th	30	10	4	16	31	43	–12	34	Round of 32

== Honours ==
- Czech 2. Liga (second tier)
  - Champions: 2001–02, 2013–14, 2018–19
  - Runners-up: 1998–99, 2005–06

== Club records ==
=== Czech First League records ===
- Best position: 6th (1993–94, 1996–97)
- Worst position: 16th (2014–15, 2024–25)
- Biggest home win: České Budějovice 5–0 Příbram (1999–2000)
- Biggest away win: Slovácká Slavia Uherské Hradiště 0–4 České Budějovice (1995–96)
- Biggest home defeat: České Budějovice 0–6 Slavia (2020–21)
- Biggest away defeat: Jablonec 8–0 České Budějovice (1997–98)
