= 2022–23 FK Jablonec season =

Jablonec
2022–23 season
- Chairman: Petr Flodrman
- Manager: David Horejš
- Stadium: Stadion Střelnice
- Czech First League: 13th
- Czech Cup: Third round
- Top goalscorer: League: Jan Chramosta (7); All: Jan Chramosta (9)
Home colours

The 2022–23 season was the 78th in the history of Fotbalový Klub Jablonec and their 29th consecutive season in the Czech First League. In addition to the domestic league, Jablonec participated in this season's editions of the Czech Cup.

== Players ==
As of 10 October 2022.

Note: Flags indicate national team as defined under FIFA eligibility rules; some limited exceptions apply. Players may hold more than one non-FIFA nationality.

No.	Pos.	Nation	Player
1	GK	CZE	Jan Hanuš
3	MF	CZE	Tomáš Hübschman
5	DF	CZE	David Štěpánek
6	MF	CZE	Tomáš Malínský
7	MF	SVK	Jakub Považanec
8	MF	CZE	David Houska
9	FW	LAT	Dāvis Ikaunieks
11	DF	MAS	Dion Cools
14	DF	CZE	Daniel Souček (on loan from Dukla Prague)
15	GK	CZE	Adam Richter
16	DF	CZE	Jan Krob
17	MF	CZE	Miloš Kratochvíl
18	DF	CZE	David Heidenreich (on loan from Atalanta)
19	FW	CZE	Jan Chramosta

No.	Pos.	Nation	Player
21	DF	CZE	Matěj Polidar (on loan from Sparta Prague)
22	DF	CZE	Jakub Martinec
23	DF	CZE	Michal Surzyn
24	MF	CZE	Dominik Pleštil
25	MF	MNE	Vladimir Jovović
28	DF	CZE	Patrik Haitl
29	GK	CZE	Jakub Surovčík
31	MF	CZE	Pavel Šulc (on loan from Viktoria Plzeň)
33	FW	CZE	Vojtěch Patrák (on loan from Sparta Prague)
44	DF	NGR	Joshua Akpudje
95	MF	CZE	Michal Černák
99	FW	CZE	Václav Sejk (on loan from Sparta Prague)
—	DF	GHA	Ishaku Konda

=== Out on loan ===
Note: Flags indicate national team as defined under FIFA eligibility rules; some limited exceptions apply. Players may hold more than one non-FIFA nationality.

No.	Pos.	Nation	Player
—	DF	CZE	Libor Holík (at Viktoria Plzeň)
—	FW	CZE	Jan Silný (at Trinity Zlín)

No.	Pos.	Nation	Player
—	FW	GHA	Torfiq Ali-Abubakar (at Prostějov)
—	MF	CZE	Tomáš Smejkal (at Vlašim)

== Pre-season and friendlies ==
Win Draw Loss Fixtures

16 July 2022 Friendly	Sassuolo (Italy)	3–1	(Czech Republic) Jablonec	Sterzing, Italy
18:00 CEST (UTC+2)	Frattesi 9'; Harroui 75'; Defrel 80'		Sejk 28'	Stadium: Centro Sportivo di Vipiteno; Referee: Andrea Bordin (Italy)

21 July 2022 Friendly	Spezia (Italy)	3–0	(Czech Republic) Jablonec	Santa Cristina Gherdëina, Italy
17:00 CEST (UTC+2)				Stadium: Centro Sportivo Mulin da Coi

10 December 2022 Friendly	Karkonosze Jelenia Góra (Poland)	0–1	(Czech Republic) Jablonec	Jelenia Góra, Poland
12:00 CET (UTC+1)				Stadium: Stadion Miejski

15 December 2022 Friendly	Miedź Legnica (Poland)	2–0	(Czech Republic) Jablonec	Jelenia Góra, Poland
12:00 CET (UTC+1)				Stadium: Stadion Miejski

13 January 2023 Friendly	Jablonec (Czech Republic)	0–1	(Switzerland) Sion	Estepona, Spain
15:00 CET (UTC+1)				Stadium: Campe de Futbol Atalaya Park Hotel

16 January 2023 Friendly	Jablonec (Czech Republic)	v	(Hungary) Diósgyőr	Spain
15:00 CET (UTC+1)

19 January 2023 Friendly	Jablonec (Czech Republic)	v	(Hungary) Puskás Akadémia	Spain
--:-- CET (UTC+1)

== Competitions ==
=== Overall record ===
Competition	First match	Last match	Starting round	Final position	Record							
Competition	First match	Last match	Starting round	Final position	Pld	W	D	L	GF	GA	GD	Win %
Czech First League	31 July 2022	28 May 2023	Matchday 1	13th	35	10	10	15	49	63	−14	28.57
Czech Cup	14 September 2022	11 October 2022	Second round	Third round	2	1	0	1	4	1	+3	50.00
Total					37	11	10	16	53	64	−11	29.73

Source: Soccerway

=== Czech First League ===
==== League table ====
Pos	Team	Pld	W	D	L	GF	GA	GD	Pts	Qualification or relegation
9	Mladá Boleslav	30	9	10	11	39	42	−3	37	Qualification for the play-off
10	České Budějovice	30	10	5	15	35	54	−19	35	Qualification for the play-off
11	Jablonec	30	9	8	13	46	57	−11	35	Qualification for the relegation group
12	Baník Ostrava	30	9	8	13	43	42	+1	35	Qualification for the relegation group
13	Teplice	30	8	8	14	38	63	−25	32	Qualification for the relegation group

Source: Fortuna Liga
Rules for classification: 1) Points; 2) Head-to-head points; 3) Head-to-head goal difference; 4) Head-to-head goals scored; 5) Goal difference; 6) Goals scored; 7) Fair-play ranking; 8) Draw.

Pos	Team	Pld	W	D	L	GF	GA	GD	Pts	Qualification or relegation	OST	TEP	JAB	PCE	ZLN	BRN
11	Baník Ostrava	35	11	9	15	53	50	+3	42		—	2–1	—	2–4	—	4–0
12	Teplice	35	11	9	15	45	67	−22	42		—	—	—	1–0	2–1	1–1
13	Jablonec	35	10	10	15	49	63	−14	40		1–1	0–2	—	—	—	1–0
14	Pardubice (O)	35	11	4	20	38	63	−25	37	Qualification for the relegation play-offs	—	—	2–0	—	1–2	—
15	Trinity Zlín (O)	35	7	13	15	43	60	−17	34	Qualification for the relegation play-offs	2–1	—	1–1	—	—	—
16	Zbrojovka Brno (R)	35	8	9	18	41	64	−23	33	Relegation to FNL	—	—	—	0–2	0–0	—

Source: Fortuna Liga
Legend: Blue = home team win; Yellow = draw; Red = away team win.
Rules for classification: 1) Total points; 2) Points earned in regular season; 3) Head-to-head points (regular season); 4) Head-to-head goal difference (regular season); 5) Head-to-head goals scored (regular season); 5) Goal difference (all matches); 6) Goals scored (all matches); 7) Fair-play ranking; 8) Draw.
(O) Play-off winners; (R) Relegated

==== Results summary ====
Overall								Home						Away					
Pld	W	D	L	GF	GA	GD	Pts	W	D	L	GF	GA	GD	W	D	L	GF	GA	GD
35	10	10	15	49	63	−14	40	6	7	5	27	24	+3	4	3	10	22	39	−17

Source: Fortuna Liga

==== Results by round ====
Round	1	2	3	4	5	6	7	8	9	10	11	12	13	14	15	16	17	18	19	20	21	22	23	24	25	26	27	28	29	30	31	32	33	34	35
Ground	H	A	H	A	H	H	A	H	A	H	A	H	A	H	A	H	A	H	A	A	H	A	H	A	H	A	H	A	H	A	A	H	H	A	H
Result	L	D	L	D	D	D	L	W	W	W	L	L	L	W	L	L	L	D	L	L	W	W	D	W	W	L	D	L	D	L	D	D	W	L	L
Position																																			

Source: Fortuna Liga
A = Away; H = Home; W = Win; D = Draw; L = Loss

==== Matches ====
The league fixtures were announced on 22 June 2022.

31 July 2022 1	Jablonec	0–3	Bohemians 1905	Jablonec nad Nisou
16:00 CEST (UTC+2)	Štěpánek (yellow card) 45'; Jovović (yellow card) 67'		Petrák 37'; Puškáč (yellow card) 62'; Květ 70'; Jánoš 87'	Stadium: Stadion Střelnice; Attendance: 3,051; Referee: Dalibor Černý

7 August 2022 2	Mladá Boleslav	2–2	Jablonec	Mladá Boleslav
16:00 CEST (UTC+2)	Matějovský 21' (pen.), (yellow card) 62'; Mareček 78'	Report	Sejk 5'; Surzyn (yellow card) 20'; Jovović 34'; Houska (yellow card) 45+2'; Kratochvíl (yellow card) 71'; Kadlec (yellow card) 90+3'	Stadium: Lokotrans Aréna; Attendance: 3,227; Referee: Tomáš Batík

14 August 2022 3	Jablonec	2–3	Slavia Prague	Jablonec nad Nisou
16:00 CEST (UTC+2)	Surzyn (red card) 6'; Horejš (not on pitch) (yellow card) 8'; Jovović (yellow card) 24'; Sejk (yellow card) 37'; Polidar 55'; Chramosta 73'	Report	Usor 8'; Schranz (yellow card) 34'; Hanuš 51' (o.g.); Traoré 61'; Mandous (yellow card) 90+5'	Stadium: Stadion Střelnice; Attendance: 5,238; Referee: Ladislav Szikszay

21 August 2022 4	Trinity Zlín	2–2	Jablonec	Zlín
16:00 CEST (UTC+2)	Jawo 33'; Cedidla (yellow card) 41'; Kolář 71'; Vukadinović (yellow card) 86'; Didiba (red card) after game'	Report	Polidar 21'; Houska (yellow card) 29'; Sejk 62'; Kratochvíl (yellow card) 80'	Stadium: Letná Stadion; Attendance: 2,411; Referee: Dominik Starý

27 August 2022 5	Jablonec	1–1	Baník Ostrava	Jablonec nad Nisou
16:00 CEST (UTC+2)	Heidenreich (yellow card) 46'; Krob (yellow card) 54'; Chramosta 66' (pen.); Kratochvíl (yellow card) 75'; Považanec (yellow card) 90+2'	Report	Boula (yellow card) 32'; Takács (yellow card) 48'; Klíma 85'	Stadium: Stadion Střelnice; Attendance: 2,911; Referee: Miroslav Zelinka

30 August 2022 6	Jablonec	1–1	Sparta Prague	Jablonec nad Nisou
20:00 CEST (UTC+2)	Považanec (yellow card) 6' (yellow-red card) 55'; Jovović (yellow card) 20'; Kratochvíl 45', (yellow card) 87'; Krob (yellow card) 54' (yellow-red card) 90+6'	Report	Daněk 10', (yellow card) 60'; Pavelka (yellow card) 46'; Minchev (yellow card) 85'; Čvančara (yellow card) 88'; Zelený (yellow card) 90+1'	Stadium: Stadion Střelnice; Attendance: 4,958; Referee: Jan Machálek

3 September 2022 7	Teplice	3–2	Jablonec	Teplice
16:00 CEST (UTC+2)	Urbanec 8'; Hybš (yellow card) 45+3'; Žák 63'; Gning 66'	Report	Chramosta 18'; Jovović (yellow card) 20' (yellow-red card) 90+2'; Polidar (yellow card) 34'; Martinec 40'; Malínský (red card) 76'	Stadium: Na Stínadlech; Attendance: 2,223; Referee: Tomáš Klíma

11 September 2022 8	Jablonec	3–0	Hradec Králové	Jablonec nad Nisou
16:00 CEST (UTC+2)	Sejk (yellow card) 50'; Martinec (yellow card) 68'; Chramosta (yellow card) 80'; Houska (yellow card) 90+1'	Report	Rada (yellow card) 57'	Stadium: Stadion Střelnice; Attendance: 2,309; Referee: Tomáš Batík

18 September 2022 9	Slovácko	0–2	Jablonec	Uherské Hradiště
16:00 CEST (UTC+2)	Havlík (yellow card) 78'	Report	Považanec (yellow card) 73', (goal) 87'; Polidar 83'	Stadium: Městský fotbalový stadion Miroslava Valenty; Attendance: 3,810; Referee: Lukáš Nehasil

2 October 2022 10	Jablonec	3–1	Zbrojovka Brno	Jablonec nad Nisou
16:00 CEST (UTC+2)	Chramosta 17', 67'; Houska (yellow card) 38'; Jovović 61'	Report	Řezníček 59'	Stadium: Stadion Střelnice; Attendance: 2,189; Referee: Jan Všetečka

8 October 2022 11	Pardubice	1–0	Jablonec	Prague (Note: Pardubice played the first half of the season in Ďolíček due to the rebuilding of their stadium.)
16:00 CEST (UTC+2)	Hlavatý 71'; Vacek (yellow card) 90+5'; Chlumecký (yellow card) 90+5'	Report	Krob (yellow card) 56'	Stadium: Ďolíček; Attendance: 629; Referee: Miroslav Zelinka

16 October 2022 12	Jablonec	0–3	Viktoria Plzeň	Jablonec nad Nisou
16:00 CEST (UTC+2)	Houska (yellow card) 71'; Heidenreich (yellow card) 81'	Report	Chorý 19', 63'; Kalvach (yellow card) 55'; N'Diaye 90+1'	Stadium: Stadion Střelnice; Attendance: 2,426; Referee: Tomáš Klíma

22 October 2022 13	Slovan Liberec	2–0	Jablonec	Liberec
16:00 CEST (UTC+2)	Rabušic 41'; Mészáros (yellow card) 56'; Višinský (yellow card) 64'; Prebsl (yellow card) 70'; Van Buren 75'	Report	Kratochvíl (yellow card) 50'; Heidenreich (yellow card) 52'; Chramosta (yellow card) 64'; Houska (yellow card) 72'	Stadium: Stadion u Nisy; Attendance: 3,758; Referee: Dalibor Černý

29 October 2022 14	Jablonec	3–0	České Budějovice	Jablonec nad Nisou
15:00 CEST (UTC+2)	Houska (yellow card) 24'; Šulc 29'; Kratochvíl (yellow card) 45+3'; Chramosta 76' (pen.); Černák 90+4'	Report	Sladký (yellow card) 39'; Potočný (yellow card) 45+3'; Čoudek (yellow card) 75'	Stadium: Stadion Střelnice; Attendance: 1,811; Referee: Tomáš Batík

5 November 2022 15	Sigma Olomouc	3–0	Jablonec	Olomouc
15:00 CET (UTC+1)	Zifčák 32', (yellow card) 61'; Spáčil 54'; Chytil 72' (pen.); Matoušek (yellow card) 83'	Report	Sejk (red card) 40'; Jovović (yellow card) 59'; Konda (yellow card) 70'	Stadium: Andrův stadion Attendance: 2,115; Referee: Marek Radina

12 November 2022 16	Jablonec	1–2	Mladá Boleslav	Jablonec nad Nisou
15:00 CET (UTC+1)	Šulc 18'; Heidenreich (red card) 42'; Surzyn (yellow card) 84'; Jovović (yellow card) 90'	Report	Šimek (yellow card) 40', (red card) 74'; Ladra 45'; Pech (yellow card) 55'; Mareček (yellow card) 86'; Kubista 87'; Matějovský (yellow card) 90+2'	Stadium: Stadion Střelnice; Attendance: 1,801; Referee: Jan Machálek

29 January 2023 17	Slavia Prague	5–1	Jablonec	Prague
15:00 CET (UTC+1)	Jurečka 12'; Van Buren 65'; Lingr 67'; Jurásek 76', 85'	Report	Jovović 45+6'; Šulc (yellow card) 56'	Stadium: Fortuna Arena; Attendance: 13,742; Referee: Dalibor Černý

4 February 2023 18	Jablonec	2–2	Trinity Zlín	Jablonec nad Nisou
15:00 CET (UTC+1)	Považanec 58', 72'; Šulc (yellow card) 77'; Jovović (yellow card) 88'	Report	Chanturishvili 20'; Reiter (yellow card) 36'; Kozák (yellow card) 45+1' (yellow-red card) 63'; Simerský (yellow card) 47'; Fillo 52'; Balaj (yellow card) 90'	Stadium: Stadion Střelnice; Attendance: 731; Referee: Miroslav Zelinka

11 February 2023 19	Baník Ostrava	1–2	Jablonec	Ostrava
15:00 CET (UTC+1)	Lischka (yellow card) 45+2'; Kuzmanović (yellow card) 64'; Tijani (yellow card) 88'; Plavšić 90+3'; Jaroň (yellow card) 90+5'	Report	Akpudje (yellow card) 21'; Klíma 29' (o.g.); Sejk 83'; Martinec (yellow card) 90+5'	Stadium: Městský stadion Attendance: 5,405; Referee: Tomáš Batík

19 February 2023 20	Sparta Prague	3–0	Jablonec	Prague
18:00 CET (UTC+1)	Haraslín 31', 71'; Kuchta 55'; Krejčí (yellow card) 87'	Report	Souček (yellow card) 50'; Král (yellow card) 80'	Stadium: Epet ARENA; Attendance: 10,917; Referee: Dalibor Černý

26 February 2023 21	Jablonec	4–1	Teplice	Jablonec nad Nisou
15:00 CET (UTC+1)	Sejk 9', 83'; Polidar 45+3'; Chramosta 55'	Report	Gning (yellow card) 45+10', (goal) 66'; Mićević (yellow card) 48'; Chaloupek (yellow card) 54'	Stadium: Stadion Střelnice; Attendance: 1,123; Referee: Pavel Orel

4 March 2023 22	Hradec Králové	1–4	Jablonec	Mladá Boleslav (Note: Hradec Králové played their home matches in Mladá Boleslav due to the rebuilding of their own Všesportovní stadion, which would finish in June 2023.)
15:00 CET (UTC+1)	Novotný 34'; Leibl (yellow card) 51' (yellow-red card) 90+8'; Bajza (red card) 54'; Ryneš (yellow card) 75'	Report	Chramosta 60', 81'; Šulc 65'; Polidar 86'	Stadium: Lokotrans Aréna; Attendance: 676; Referee: Miroslav Zelinka

19 March 2023 24	Zbrojovka Brno	1–2	Jablonec	Brno
15:00 CET (UTC+1)	Nečas (yellow card) 2'; Alli 40'; Tijani (yellow card) 51'; Granečný (yellow card) 79'; Šural (yellow card) 90+1'	Report	Polidar (yellow card) 8'; Hübschman (yellow card) 15'; Chramosta 47'; Martinec (yellow card) 61'; Považanec 67'; Sejk (yellow card) 73'	Stadium: ADAX INVEST Arena; Attendance: 4,026; Referee: Tomáš Batík

2 April 2023 25	Jablonec	1–0	Pardubice	Jablonec nad Nisou
16:00 CEST (UTC+2)	Chramosta 89', (yellow card) 89'	Report	Vacek (yellow card) 47'	Stadium: Stadion Střelnice; Attendance: 1,637; Referee: Jan Všetečka

5 April 2023 23	Jablonec	1–1	Slovácko	Jablonec nad Nisou
17:00 CEST (UTC+2)	Hübschman 47'; Král (yellow card) 64'; Jovović (yellow card) 68'	Report	Kalabiška 37'	Stadium: Stadion Střelnice; Attendance: 1,620; Referee: Dominik Starý
Note: The match was originally scheduled for 12 March 2023, but was postponed due to snow.

8 April 2023 26	Viktoria Plzeň	3–2	Jablonec	Plzeň
19:00 CEST (UTC+2)	Sýkora 45+3'; Vydra 77', 82'	Report	Polidar 66', 74'	Stadium: Doosan Arena; Attendance: 8,309; Referee: Pavel Orel

15 April 2023 27	Jablonec	1–1	Slovan Liberec	Jablonec nad Nisou
16:00 CEST (UTC+2)	Polidar (yellow card) 44'; Chramosta 81'	Report	Frýdek (yellow card) 44'; Doumbia 60'; Olatunji (yellow card) 65'	Stadium: Stadion Střelnice; Attendance: 3,211; Referee: Miroslav Zelinka

23 April 2023 28	České Budějovice	5–1	Jablonec	České Budějovice
16:00 CEST (UTC+2)	Hora 18'; Havel 21'; Čmelík 45+2'; Penner (yellow card) 46'; Čoudek 53'; Adediran 70'	Report	Martinec (yellow card) 42'; Souček 59'; Hübschman (yellow card) 82'	Stadium: Stadion Střelecký ostrov Attendance: 2,895; Referee: Lukáš Nehasil

26 April 2023 29	Jablonec	2–2	Sigma Olomouc	Jablonec nad Nisou
17:30 CEST (UTC+2)	Chramosta 15'; Sejk 25'; Považanec (yellow card) 51'; Hanuš (yellow card) 86'	Report	Greššák (yellow card) 35'; Chvátal (yellow card) 65'; Chytil 81' (pen.); Beneš 90+4'	Stadium: Stadion Střelnice; Attendance: 1,714; Referee: Jan Všetečka

30 April 2023 30	Bohemians 1905	4–1	Jablonec	Prague
15:00 CEST (UTC+2)	Matoušek 9'; Jindřišek 20' (pen.); Vondra (yellow card) 32'; Puškáč (yellow card) 52'; Drchal 54'; Prekop 89'	Report	Akpudje (yellow card) 19'; Šulc 79'; Martinec (yellow card) 83'	Stadium: Ďolíček; Attendance: 5,679; Referee: Tomáš Batík

==== Relegation group ====
6 May 2023 31	Trinity Zlín	1–1	Jablonec	Zlín
15:00 CEST (UTC+2)	Vrba (not on pitch) (yellow card) 27'; Didiba (yellow card) 45'; Kovinič 60'; Procházka (yellow card) 81'	Report	Šulc 53'; Král (yellow card) 65'; Polidar (yellow card) 85'	Stadium: Letná Stadion; Attendance: 3,371; Referee: Miroslav Zelinka

14 May 2023 32	Jablonec	1–1	Baník Ostrava	Jablonec nad Nisou
15:00 CEST (UTC+2)	Chramosta 35' (pen.); Jovović (yellow card) 79'	Report	Cadu 51'; Hapal (not on pitch) (yellow card) 54'; Šehić (yellow card) 90+2'	Stadium: Stadion Střelnice; Attendance: 2,472; Referee: Petr Hocek

21 May 2023 33	Jablonec	1–0	Zbrojovka Brno	Jablonec nad Nisou
15:00 CEST (UTC+2)	Štěpánek (yellow card) 5'; Král 28'; Ikaunieks (yellow card) 90+3'	Report	Blecha (yellow card) 90'	Stadium: Stadion Střelnice; Attendance: 1,554; Referee: Marek Radina

24 May 2023 34	Pardubice	2–0	Jablonec	Pardubice
19:00 CEST (UTC+2)	Sychra 8'; Černý 26'; Vacek (yellow card) 61'	Report	Štěpánek (yellow card) 90+1'	Stadium: CFIG Arena; Attendance: 4,143; Referee: Ondřej Berka

28 May 2023 35	Jablonec	0–2	Teplice	Jablonec nad Nisou
17:00 CEST (UTC+2)	Surzyn (yellow card) 90'	Report	Jukl (yellow card) 2'; Gning 30'; Radosta 49'; Beránek (yellow card) 79'	Stadium: Stadion Střelnice; Attendance: 2,059; Referee: Michal Křepský

=== Czech Cup ===
14 September 2022 Second round	Motorlet Prague	0–4	Jablonec	Prague
16:30 CEST (UTC+2)		Report	Cools 17'; Martinec 45'; Chramosta 57', 77' (pen.)	Stadium: Stadion Motorlet

11 October 2022 Third round	Jablonec	0–1	Vyškov	Jablonec nad Nisou
17:00 CEST (UTC+2)	A. Richter (yellow card) 85'	Report	Vintr 86' (pen.), (yellow card) 90+1'	Stadium: Stadion Střelnice; Referee: Jan Machálek
