= 2023–24 FK Jablonec season =

Jablonec
2023–24 season
- Manager: Radoslav Látal
- Stadium: Stadion Střelnice
- Czech First League: 11th
- Czech Cup: Quarter-finals
- Top goalscorer: League: Jan Chramosta (8); All: Jan Chramosta (10)
- Average home league attendance: 2,455
Home colours	colours

The 2023–24 season was Fotbalový Klub Jablonec's 79th season in existence and 30th consecutive in the Czech First League. In addition to the domestic league, Jablonec participated in that season's editions of the Czech Cup.

== Players ==
=== First-team squad ===
As of 17 August 2023.

Note: Flags indicate national team as defined under FIFA eligibility rules; some limited exceptions apply. Players may hold more than one non-FIFA nationality.

No.	Pos.	Nation	Player
1	GK	CZE	Jan Hanuš
2	DF	COL	Haiderson Hurtado
3	MF	CZE	Tomáš Hübschman
4	DF	SRB	Nemanja Tekijaški
5	DF	CZE	David Štěpánek
6	MF	CZE	Filip Souček (on loan from Sparta Prague)
8	MF	CZE	David Houska
9	FW	LAT	Dāvis Ikaunieks
10	MF	CZE	Patrik Schön
11	FW	CZE	Matěj Náprstek
12	DF	CZE	David Nykrín
14	DF	CZE	Daniel Souček
17	MF	CZE	Miloš Kratochvíl

No.	Pos.	Nation	Player
19	FW	CZE	Jan Chramosta
21	DF	CZE	Matěj Polidar (on loan from Sparta Prague)
22	DF	CZE	Jakub Martinec
23	FW	CZE	Václav Drchal
24	MF	CZE	Dominik Pleštil
25	MF	MNE	Vladimir Jovović
28	GK	CZE	Vilém Fendrich
30	GK	CZE	Vojtěch Myška
33	MF	CMR	Alexis Alégué
37	FW	CZE	Matouš Krulich
44	DF	NGR	Joshua Akpudje
77	MF	GEO	Vakhtang Chanturishvili
95	MF	CZE	Michal Černák

=== Out on loan ===
Note: Flags indicate national team as defined under FIFA eligibility rules; some limited exceptions apply. Players may hold more than one non-FIFA nationality.

No. / Pos. / Nation / Player; — / FW / CZE / Ondřej Podzimek (at Varnsdorf)	No. / Pos. / Nation / Player; — / FW / CZE / Jan Silný (at Prostějov)

== Transfers ==
=== In ===
Pos.	Player	Transferred from	Fee	Date	Source

=== Out ===
Pos.	Player	Transferred to	Fee	Date	Source

== Pre-season and friendlies ==
Win Draw Loss Fixtures

4 July 2023 Friendly	WSG Tirol (Austria)	1–2	(Czech Republic) Jablonec
16:00

7 July 2023 Friendly	Wacker Innsbruck (Austria)	0–2	(Czech Republic) Jablonec
19:00

9 July 2023 Friendly	Al-Shabab (Saudi Arabia)	1–1	(Czech Republic) Jablonec
18:00

15 July 2023 Friendly	Zagłębie Lubin (Poland)	0–1	(Czech Republic) Jablonec
17:00

== Competitions ==
=== Overall record ===
Competition	First match	Last match	Starting round	Final position	Record							
Competition	First match	Last match	Starting round	Final position	Pld	W	D	L	GF	GA	GD	Win %
Czech First League	23 July 2023	25 May 2024	Matchday 1	11th	35	9	14	12	45	50	−5	25.71
Czech Cup	5 September 2023	2 April 2024	Second round	Quarter-finals	4	2	1	1	8	6	+2	50.00
Total					39	11	15	13	53	56	−3	28.21

Source: Soccerway

=== Czech First League ===
==== Results summary ====
Overall								Home						Away					
Pld	W	D	L	GF	GA	GD	Pts	W	D	L	GF	GA	GD	W	D	L	GF	GA	GD
35	9	14	12	45	50	−5	41	7	7	4	28	23	+5	2	7	8	17	27	−10

Source: Fortuna Liga

==== Regular season ====
===== Table =====
Pos	Team	Pld	W	D	L	GF	GA	GD	Pts	Qualification or relegation
10	Teplice	30	9	9	12	31	40	−9	36	Qualification for the Play-off
11	Bohemians 1905	30	8	11	11	29	40	−11	35	Qualification for the Relegation group
12	Jablonec	30	6	12	12	35	45	−10	30	Qualification for the Relegation group
13	Pardubice	30	7	7	16	29	42	−13	28	Qualification for the Relegation group
14	Karviná	30	6	7	17	30	52	−22	25	Qualification for the Relegation group

Source: Fortuna Liga
Rules for classification: 1) Points; 2) Head-to-head points; 3) Head-to-head goal difference; 4) Head-to-head goals scored; 5) Goal difference; 6) Goals scored; 7) Fair-play ranking; 8) Draw.

===== Results by round =====
Round	1	2	3	4	5	6	7	8	9	10	11	12	13	14	15	16	17	18	19	20	21	22	23	24	25	26	27	28	29	30
Ground	A	A	A	H	A	H	A	H	A	H	A	H	A	H	A	H	H	A	H	A	H	A	H	A	H	A	H	A	H	H
Result	L	D	D	L	D	D	L	D	L	W	L	L	W	D	D	W	W	L	D	L	W	D	D	W	L	L	L	L	D	D
Position	11	13	12	14	14	15	16	14	14	12	14	15	14	14	12	12	12	12	11	13	11	11	11	10	10	12	12	12	12	12

Source: Fortuna Liga
A = Away; H = Home; W = Win; D = Draw; L = Loss

===== Matches =====
The league fixtures were unveiled on 21 June 2023.

23 July 2023 1	Mladá Boleslav	3–1	Jablonec	Mladá Boleslav
15:00 CEST (UTC+2)	Kušej 8'; Kostka 47'; Jawo 57'	Report	Alégué 75'	Stadium: Lokotrans Aréna; Attendance: 3,431; Referee: Pavel Orel

29 July 2023 2	Pardubice	0–0	Jablonec	Pardubice
15:00 CEST (UTC+2)		Report		Stadium: CFIG Arena; Attendance: 3,012; Referee: Jan Všetečka

6 August 2023 3	Teplice	0–0	Jablonec	Teplice
15:00 CEST (UTC+2)		Report		Stadium: Na Stínadlech; Attendance: 5,258; Referee: Jan Machálek

12 August 2023 4	Jablonec	1–5	Sparta Prague	Jablonec nad Nisou
18:00 CEST (UTC+2)	Martinec (yellow card) 56'; Drchal 60'; Alégué (yellow card) 73'; Černák (yellow card) 90+1'	Report	Vitík 12', 27'; Minchev 35'; Kairinen 39'; Sejk (yellow card) 44'; Wiesner 45+1'; Sadílek (yellow card) 88'	Stadium: Stadion Střelnice; Attendance: 5,684; Referee: Tomáš Batík

19 August 2023 5	Karviná	1–1	Jablonec	Karviná
15:00 CEST (UTC+2)	Akinyemi 84'	Report	Kratochvíl 56' (pen.)	Stadium: Městský stadion Attendance: 2,340; Referee: Vít Zaoral

27 August 2023 6	Jablonec	1–1	Slavia Prague	Jablonec nad Nisou
15:00 CEST (UTC+2)	Pleštil 43'	Report	Holeš 48'	Stadium: Stadion Střelnice; Attendance: 4,511; Referee: Dalibor Černý

2 September 2023 7	České Budějovice	2–1	Jablonec	České Budějovice
15:00 CEST (UTC+2)	Hora 20' (pen.); Alli 56'	Report	Kratochvíl 6'	Stadium: Stadion Střelecký ostrov Attendance: 2,736; Referee: Filip Kotala

17 September 2023 8	Jablonec	1–1	Slovan Liberec	Jablonec nad Nisou
15:00 CEST (UTC+2)	Tekijaški 53'	Report	Tupta 8' (pen.)	Stadium: Stadion Střelnice; Attendance: 3,650; Referee: Ondřej Berka

24 September 2023 9	Hradec Králové	1–0	Jablonec	Hradec Králové
15:00 CEST (UTC+2)	Horák 17'	Report		Stadium: Malšovická aréna Attendance: 7,762; Referee: Jan Machálek

30 September 2023 10	Jablonec	2–0	Slovácko	Jablonec nad Nisou
15:00 CEST (UTC+2)	Chramosta 10'; Krulich 20'	Report		Stadium: Stadion Střelnice; Attendance: 2,642; Referee: Stanislav Volek

8 October 2023 11	Viktoria Plzeň	3–2	Jablonec	Plzeň
18:00 CEST (UTC+2)	Jirka 22' (pen.); Mosquera 38'; Vydra 46'	Report	Krulich 30'; Chramosta 34'	Stadium: Doosan Arena; Attendance: 8,505; Referee: Ondřej Berka

22 October 2023 12	Jablonec	0–1	Bohemians 1905	Jablonec nad Nisou
18:00 CEST (UTC+2)		Report	Prekop 25'	Stadium: Stadion Střelnice; Attendance: 2,613; Referee: Jan Všetečka

28 October 2023 13	Baník Ostrava	0–1	Jablonec	Ostrava
18:00 CEST (UTC+2)		Report	Chramosta 84'	Stadium: Městský stadion Attendance: 8,330; Referee: Tomáš Klíma

4 November 2023 14	Jablonec	1–1	Sigma Olomouc	Jablonec nad Nisou
15:00 CET (UTC+1)	Štěpánek 5'	Report	Juliš 18'	Stadium: Stadion Střelnice; Attendance: 2,387; Referee: Filip Kotala

11 November 2023 15	Zlín	1–1	Jablonec	Zlín
15:00 CET (UTC+1)	Fantiš 19'	Report	Martinec 49'	Stadium: Letná Stadion; Attendance: 3,031; Referee: Karel Rouček

26 November 2023 16	Jablonec	2–1	Pardubice	Jablonec nad Nisou
15:00 CET (UTC+1)	Kratochvíl 37', 75'	Report	Zlatohlávek 12'	Stadium: Stadion Střelnice; Attendance: 1,411; Referee: Stanislav Volek

6 December 2023 17	Jablonec	3–2	Teplice	Jablonec nad Nisou
17:00 CET (UTC+1)	Kratochvíl 16' (pen.); Urbanec 45' (o.g.); Chramosta 86'	Report	Havelka 27', 65' (pen.)	Stadium: Stadion Střelnice; Attendance: 789; Referee: Tomáš Batík

9 December 2023 18	Sparta Prague	3–0	Jablonec	Prague
15:00 CET (UTC+1)	Kuchta 15'; Haraslín 17'; Preciado 24'; Vitík (red card) 58'; Laçi (yellow card) 64'	Report	Alégué (yellow card) 39'; Štěpánek (yellow card) 54'; Kratochvíl (yellow card) 69'	Stadium: epet ARENA; Attendance: 16,111; Referee: Ondřej Pechanec

16 December 2023 19	Jablonec	0–0	Karviná	Jablonec nad Nisou
15:00 CET (UTC+1)		Report		Stadium: Stadion Střelnice; Attendance: 1,059; Referee: Dalibor Černý

11 February 2024 20	Slavia Prague	4–3	Jablonec	Prague
18:00 CET (UTC+1)	Wallem 3', 11'; Jurečka 24', 90+7'	Report	Chanturishvili 5'; Chramosta 14'; Martinec 48'	Stadium: Fortuna Arena; Attendance: 17,202; Referee: Dominik Starý

17 February 2024 21	Jablonec	5–2	České Budějovice	Jablonec nad Nisou
15:00 CET (UTC+1)	Chanturishvili 8'; Martinec 47'; Tekijaški 58'; Nebyla 72'; Drchal 90+2'	Report	Hellebrand 18'; Suchan 62'	Stadium: Stadion Střelnice; Attendance: 1,443; Referee: Jan Machálek

24 February 2024 22	Slovan Liberec	3–3	Jablonec	Liberec
15:00 CET (UTC+1)	Rabušic 72' (pen.); Preisler 85'; Chaluš 90+1'	Report	Chramosta 13' (pen.); Mikula 58' (o.g.); Chanturishvili 73'	Stadium: Stadion u Nisy; Attendance: 4,427; Referee: Ondřej Pechanec

2 March 2024 23	Jablonec	1–1	Hradec Králové	Jablonec nad Nisou
15:00 CET (UTC+1)	Chramosta 35' (pen.)	Report	Spáčil 5'	Stadium: Stadion Střelnice; Attendance: 1,832; Referee: Jan Petřík

9 March 2024 24	Slovácko	0–1	Jablonec	Uherské Hradiště
15:00 CET (UTC+1)		Report	Štěpánek 61'	Stadium: Městský fotbalový stadion Miroslava Valenty; Attendance: 4,229; Referee: Jan Všetečka

17 March 2024 25	Jablonec	1–2	Viktoria Plzeň	Jablonec nad Nisou
15:00 CET (UTC+1)	Chramosta 73'	Report	Hejda 20'; Chorý 84'	Stadium: Stadion Střelnice; Attendance: 3,011; Referee: Ondřej Pechanec

30 March 2024 26	Bohemians 1905	2–0	Jablonec	Prague
15:00 CET (UTC+1)	Beran 22'; Hůlka 40'	Report		Stadium: Ďolíček; Attendance: 5,895; Referee: Dalibor Černý

7 April 2024 27	Jablonec	2–3	Baník Ostrava	Jablonec nad Nisou
15:00 CEST (UTC+2)	Hollý 45+1'; Černák 79'	Report	Klíma 11'; Kpozo 24'; Tekijaški 61' (o.g.)	Stadium: Stadion Střelnice; Attendance: 2,518; Referee: Ondřej Berka

14 April 2024 28	Sigma Olomouc	1–0	Jablonec	Olomouc
15:00 CEST (UTC+2)	Chvátal 74'	Report		Stadium: Andrův stadion Attendance: 3,036; Referee: Karel Rouček

20 April 2024 29	Jablonec	0–0	Zlín	Jablonec nad Nisou
15:00 CEST (UTC+2)		Report		Stadium: Stadion Střelnice; Attendance: 1,250; Referee: Jan Všetečka

28 April 2024 30	Jablonec	1–1	Mladá Boleslav	Jablonec nad Nisou
15:00 CEST (UTC+2)	Polidar 19'	Report	Helal 90+1'	Stadium: Stadion Střelnice; Attendance: 2,027; Referee: Ladislav Szikszay

==== Relegation group ====
Pos	Team	Pld	W	D	L	GF	GA	GD	Pts	Qualification or relegation	JAB	PCE	BOH	KAR	CBU	ZLN
11	Jablonec	35	9	14	12	45	50	−5	41		—	3–0	—	3–2	—	1–0
12	Pardubice	35	11	7	17	39	47	−8	40		—	—	—	4–0	3–2	2–0
13	Bohemians 1905	35	9	12	14	34	48	−14	39		1–1	0–1	—	1–3	—	—
14	Karviná (O)	35	8	8	19	38	62	−24	32	Qualification for the relegation play-offs	—	—	—	—	1–0	2–2
15	České Budějovice (O)	35	7	8	20	41	70	−29	29	Qualification for the relegation play-offs	2–2	—	2–1	—	—	—
16	Zlín (R)	35	5	12	18	40	69	−29	27	Relegation to FNL	—	—	1–2	—	1–1	—

Source: Fortuna Liga
Legend: Blue = home team win; Yellow = draw; Red = away team win.
Rules for classification: 1) Total points; 2) Points earned in regular season; 3) Head-to-head points (regular season); 4) Head-to-head goal difference (regular season); 5) Head-to-head goals scored (regular season); 5) Goal difference (all matches); 6) Goals scored (all matches); 7) Fair-play ranking; 8) Draw.
(O) Play-off winners; (R) Relegated

===== Results by round =====
Round	1	2	3	4	5
Ground	H	A	H	A	H
Result	W	D	W	D	W
Position	12	12	11	12	11

Source: Fortuna Liga
A = Away; H = Home; W = Win; D = Draw; L = Loss

===== Matches =====
4 May 2024 31	Jablonec	3–2	Karviná	Jablonec nad Nisou
15:00 CEST (UTC+2)	Polidar (yellow card) 28'; Chanturishvili 37'; Tekijaški (yellow card) 43'; Hurtado (yellow card) 59'; Martinec 89'; D. Souček (yellow card) 90+3'; Náprstek 90+6'	Report	Svozil (yellow card) 10'; Hurtado 36' (o.g.); Fleišman 60'; Vlk (not on pitch) (yellow card) 87'	Stadium: Stadion Střelnice; Attendance: 1,843; Referee: Jan Machálek

12 May 2024 32	Bohemians 1905	1–1	Jablonec	Prague
15:00 CEST (UTC+2)	Prekop (yellow card) 44'; Hybš (yellow card) 67'; Huf 87'	Report	Alégué 2', (yellow card) 82'; Souček (yellow card) 22'; Kratochvíl (yellow card) 37'; Krob (not on pitch) (yellow card) 64'; Náprstek (yellow card) 90'; Martinec (yellow card) 90+5'	Stadium: Ďolíček; Attendance: 4,495; Referee: Jan Petřík

16 May 2024 33	Jablonec	3–0	Pardubice	Jablonec nad Nisou
17:00 CEST (UTC+2)	Polidar 64'; Kratochvíl 78'; Náprstek 87'	Report		Stadium: Stadion Střelnice; Attendance: 1,897; Referee: Jan Všetečka

19 May 2024 34	České Budějovice	2–2	Jablonec	České Budějovice
17:00 CEST (UTC+2)	Ondrášek 33'; Tranziska 36'; Havel (yellow card) 88'; Suchan (yellow card) 90+5'	Report	Kratochvíl (yellow card) 23', (goal) 43'; Látal (coach) (yellow card) 38'; Náprstek 38'; Štěpánek (yellow card) 67'	Stadium: Stadion Střelecký ostrov Attendance: 5,101; Referee: Dominik Starý

25 May 2024 35	Jablonec	1–0	Zlín	Jablonec nad Nisou
18:00 CEST (UTC+2)	Tekijaški (yellow card) 12'; Krulich (yellow card) 45+2'; Polidar (yellow card) 50'; Hollý (yellow card) 90+3'	Report		Stadium: Stadion Střelnice; Attendance: 1,583; Referee: Ondřej Berka

=== Czech Cup ===
5 September 2023 Second round	Admira Prague	1–5	Jablonec	Prague
17:00 CEST (UTC+2)	V. Burýšek 58'	Report	Alégué 6', 62'; Chramosta 47', 48'; Tekijaški 52'	Stadium: Stadion Na Pecích

27 September 2023 Third round	Jiskra Domažlice	1–1 (a.e.t.) (4–5 p)	Jablonec	Domažlice
15:30 CEST (UTC+2)	F. Dvořák 34'	Report	Náprstek 85'	Stadium: Městský stadion Střelnice; Referee: Karel Rouček
Note: Jablonec won 5–4 on penalties.

16 November 2023 Fourth round	České Budějovice	1–2	Jablonec	České Budějovice
17:00 CET (UTC+1)	Osmančík 41'	Report	Kratochvíl 38' (pen.); Nikl 57' (o.g.)	Stadium: Stadion Střelecký ostrov Referee: Ondřej Pechanec

2 April 2024 Quarter-finals	Jablonec	0–3	Viktoria Plzeň	Jablonec nad Nisou
18:00 CEST (UTC+2)		Report	Tekijaški 34' (o.g.); Kopic 36'; Souaré 65'	Stadium: Stadion Střelnice; Referee: Marek Radina
Note: The match was originally scheduled for 28 February 2024, but was postponed due to thick fog.
