= 2021–22 FK Jablonec season =

Jablonec
2021–22 season
- Chairman: Petr Flodrman
- Manager: Petr Rada
- Stadium: Stadion Střelnice
- Czech First League: 13th
- Czech Cup: Semi-finals
- UEFA Europa League: Third qualifying round
- UEFA Europa Conference League: Group stage
Home colours	Away colours

The 2021–22 season was the 77th season in the existence of FK Jablonec and the club's 28th consecutive season in the top flight of Czech football. In addition to the domestic league, Jablonec participated in this season's editions of the Czech Cup, UEFA Europa League and UEFA Europa Conference League.

== Players ==
=== First-team squad ===
As of 24 July 2021.

Note: Flags indicate national team as defined under FIFA eligibility rules; some limited exceptions apply. Players may hold more than one non-FIFA nationality.

No.	Pos.	Nation	Player
1	GK	CZE	Jan Hanuš
2	MF	CZE	Antonín Vaníček (on loan from Bohemians 1905)
3	MF	CZE	Tomáš Hübschman
4	DF	CZE	Libor Holík
5	DF	CZE	David Štěpánek
6	MF	CZE	Tomáš Malínský (on loan from Slavia Prague)
7	MF	SVK	Jakub Považanec
8	MF	CZE	David Houska
10	FW	CZE	Tomáš Čvančara
11	MF	CZE	Václav Pilař
12	DF	CZE	Jaroslav Zelený
13	GK	CZE	Tomáš Vajner
14	MF	CZE	Tomáš Smejkal

No.	Pos.	Nation	Player
15	FW	CZE	Martin Doležal
16	DF	CZE	Jan Krob
17	MF	CZE	Miloš Kratochvíl
19	MF	CZE	Vojtěch Werani
22	DF	CZE	Jakub Martinec
23	DF	CZE	Michal Surzyn
24	MF	CZE	Dominik Pleštil
25	MF	CZE	Michal Kinčl
27	MF	CZE	Vojtěch Kubista
28	DF	CZE	Patrik Haitl
30	GK	CZE	Vlastimil Hrubý
31	FW	GHA	Torfiq Ali-Abubakar

=== Out on loan ===
Note: Flags indicate national team as defined under FIFA eligibility rules; some limited exceptions apply. Players may hold more than one non-FIFA nationality.

No.	Pos.	Nation	Player
—	FW	LAT	Dāvis Ikaunieks (at FK Liepāja)
—	FW	CZE	Jan Chramosta (at Bohemians 1905)

== Pre-season and friendlies ==
Win Draw Loss Fixtures

30 June 2021 Friendly	Dynamo Dresden (Germany)	3–1	(Czech Republic) Jablonec	Dresden, Germany
14:00 CEST (UTC+2)	Daferner 21', 59'; Hosiner 41'	Report	Kratochvíl 36'	Stadium: Rudolf-Harbig-Stadion; Attendance: 250

15 July 2021 Friendly	Dynamo Moscow (Russia)	0–2	(Czech Republic) Jablonec	Austria
16:00 CEST (UTC+2)

== Competitions ==
=== Overall record ===
Competition	First match	Last match	Starting round	Final position	Record							
Competition	First match	Last match	Starting round	Final position	Pld	W	D	L	GF	GA	GD	Win %
Czech First League	24 July 2021	14 May 2022	Matchday 1	13th	35	6	16	13	27	48	−21	17.14
Czech Cup	22 September 2021	2 March 2022	Third round	Semi-finals	4	3	0	1	12	4	+8	75.00
UEFA Europa League	5 August 2021	12 August 2021	Third qualifying round	Third qualifying round	2	0	0	2	2	7	−5	0.00
UEFA Europa Conference League	19 August 2021	9 December 2021	Play-off round	Group stage	8	3	3	2	14	9	+5	37.50
Total					49	12	19	18	55	68	−13	24.49

Source: Soccerway

=== Czech First League ===
==== League table ====
Pos	Team	Pld	W	D	L	GF	GA	GD	Pts	Qualification or relegation
11	Fastav Zlín	30	8	6	16	36	53	−17	30	Qualification for the relegation group
12	Teplice	30	8	3	19	29	49	−20	27	Qualification for the relegation group
13	Jablonec	30	4	14	12	22	45	−23	26	Qualification for the relegation group
14	Bohemians 1905	30	6	8	16	34	56	−22	26	Qualification for the relegation group
15	Pardubice	30	5	9	16	35	67	−32	24	Qualification for the relegation group

Source: Fortuna Liga
Rules for classification: 1) Points; 2) Head-to-head points; 3) Head-to-head goal difference; 4) Head-to-head goals scored; 5) Goal difference; 6) Goals scored; 7) Fair-play ranking; 8) Draw.

Pos	Team	Pld	W	D	L	GF	GA	GD	Pts	Qualification or relegation	PCE	ZLN	JAB	BOH	TEP	KAR
11	Pardubice	35	9	10	16	42	68	−26	37		—	1–1	—	—	—	2–0
12	Fastav Zlín	35	9	9	17	43	60	−17	36		—	—	1–1	1–4	3–0	—
13	Jablonec	35	6	16	13	27	48	−21	34		0–1	—	—	1–1	—	2–0
14	Bohemians 1905 (O)	35	8	10	17	45	61	−16	34	Qualification for the relegation play-offs	0–1	—	—	—	—	4–0
15	Teplice (O)	35	8	5	22	33	59	−26	29	Qualification for the relegation play-offs	0–2	—	0–1	2–2	—	—
16	Karviná (R)	35	3	10	22	33	63	−30	19	Relegation to the FNL	—	1–1	—	—	2–2	—

Source: Fortuna Liga
Legend: Blue = home team win; Yellow = draw; Red = away team win.
Rules for classification: 1) Total points; 2) Points earned in regular season; 3) Head-to-head points (regular season); 4) Head-to-head goal difference (regular season); 5) Head-to-head goals scored (regular season); 5) Goal difference (all matches); 6) Goals scored (all matches); 7) Fair-play ranking; 8) Draw.
(O) Play-off winners; (R) Relegated

==== Results summary ====
Overall								Home						Away					
Pld	W	D	L	GF	GA	GD	Pts	W	D	L	GF	GA	GD	W	D	L	GF	GA	GD
35	6	16	13	27	48	−21	34	4	9	5	16	17	−1	2	7	8	11	31	−20

Source: Fortuna Liga

==== Matches ====
24 July 2021 1	Jablonec	1–0	Baník Ostrava	Jablonec nad Nisou
15:00 CEST (UTC+2)	Pilař 88'	Report		Stadium: Stadion Střelnice; Attendance: 2,385; Referee: Ondrej Pechanec

31 July 2021 2	Mladá Boleslav	3–0	Jablonec	Mladá Boleslav
16:00 CEST (UTC+2)	Fila 11'; Mil. Škoda 14', 79'	Report		Stadium: Lokotrans Aréna; Attendance: 2,471; Referee: Miroslav Zelinka

8 August 2021 3	Jablonec	2–2	Bohemians 1905	Jablonec nad Nisou
16:00 CEST (UTC+2)	Pilař 77' (pen.); Čvančara 83'	Report	Puškáč 16'; Kovařík 90+4' (pen.)	Stadium: Stadion Střelnice; Attendance: 2,693; Referee: Tomáš Klíma

15 August 2021 4	Teplice	1–0	Jablonec	Teplice
16:00 CET (UTC+1)	Krunert 10'	Report		Stadium: Na Stínadlech; Attendance: 2,225; Referee: Pavel Julínek

22 August 2021 5	Jablonec	1–1	Slovácko	Jablonec nad Nisou
16:00 CEST (UTC+2)	Čvančara 76' (pen.)	Report	Jurečka 45'	Stadium: Stadion Střelnice; Attendance: 2,487; Referee: Jan Petřík

29 August 2021 6	Sigma Olomouc	4–0	Jablonec	Olomouc
16:00 CEST (UTC+2)	González 4'; Zmrzlý 58'; Hála 73', 79'	Report		Stadium: Andrův stadion Attendance: 3,005; Referee: Ondřej Berka

12 September 2021 7	Jablonec	1–0	Karviná	Jablonec nad Nisou
16:00 CEST (UTC+2)	Malínský 45+3'	Report		Stadium: Stadion Střelnice; Attendance: 2,468; Referee: Tomáš Batík

19 September 2021 8	Sparta Prague	1–1	Jablonec	Prague
16:00 CEST (UTC+2)	Drchal 4'	Report	Čvančara 48'	Stadium: Generali Arena; Attendance: 8,115; Referee: Pavel Orel

26 September 2021 9	Jablonec	0–1	Slovan Liberec	Jablonec nad Nisou
16:00 CEST (UTC+2)		Report	Tupta 37'	Stadium: Stadion Střelnice; Attendance: 3,811; Referee: Karel Hrubeš

3 October 2021 10	Hradec Králové	2–2	Jablonec	Mladá Boleslav
16:00 CEST (UTC+2)	Dvořák 19'; Král 62'	Report	Kratochvíl 13'; Malínský 90+8'	Stadium: Lokotrans Aréna (Note: Hradec Králové played their home matches in Mladá Boleslav due to the rebuilding of their own Všesportovní stadion.); Attendance: 854; Referee: Petr Hocek

16 October 2021 11	Jablonec	2–2	České Budějovice	Jablonec nad Nisou
16:00 CEST (UTC+2)	Doležal 15', 78'	Report	Mršić 20'; Mihálik 23'	Stadium: Stadion Střelnice; Attendance: 2,424; Referee: Miroslav Zelinka

24 October 2021 12	Viktoria Plzeň	5–0	Jablonec	Plzeň
16:00 CEST (UTC+2)	Kopic 15', 70'; Beauguel 18'; Mosquera 73'; Šulc 89'	Report		Stadium: Doosan Arena; Attendance: 7,607; Referee: Karel Hrubeš

31 October 2021 13	Jablonec	1–1	Pardubice	Jablonec nad Nisou
15:00 CET (UTC+1)	Čvančara 10'	Report	Tischler 30'	Stadium: Stadion Střelnice; Attendance: 2,444; Referee: Tomáš Batík

7 November 2021 14	Fastav Zlín	0–0	Jablonec	Zlín
15:00 CET (UTC+1)		Report		Stadium: Letná Stadion; Attendance: 2,286; Referee: Josef Krejsa

21 November 2021 15	Slavia Prague	5–0	Jablonec	Prague
18:00 CET (UTC+1)	Olayinka 15'; Kuchta 33'; Bah 40'; Lingr 77', 90+1'	Report		Stadium: Fortuna Arena; Attendance: 10,145; Referee: Dalibor Černý

28 November 2021 16	Jablonec	0–1	Mladá Boleslav	Jablonec nad Nisou
15:00 CET (UTC+1)		Report	Hlavatý 51'	Stadium: Stadion Střelnice; Attendance: 639; Referee: Tomáš Klíma

5 December 2021 17	Bohemians 1905	1–2	Jablonec	Prague
15:00 CET (UTC+1)	Hronek 85'	Report	Čvančara 8'; Houska 45+1'	Stadium: Ďolíček; Attendance: 1,000; Referee: Ladislav Szikszay

12 December 2021 18	Jablonec	0–2	Teplice	Jablonec nad Nisou
15:00 CET (UTC+1)		Report	Fortelný 21'; Hyčka 71'	Stadium: Stadion Střelnice; Attendance: 376; Referee: Jan Petřík

18 December 2021 19	Slovácko	2–1	Jablonec	Uherské Hradiště
19:00 CET (UTC+1)	Jurečka 10'; Petržela 56'	Report	Hübschman 39'	Stadium: Městský fotbalový stadion Miroslava Valenty; Attendance: 997; Referee: Ondřej Berka

5 February 2022 20	Jablonec	1–0	Sigma Olomouc	Jablonec nad Nisou
15:00 CET (UTC+1)	Kratochvíl 49'	Report		Stadium: Stadion Střelnice; Attendance: 755; Referee: Petr Hocek

13 February 2022 21	Karviná	1–1	Jablonec	Karviná
15:00 CET (UTC+1)	Čmelík 51' (pen.)	Report	Pilař 85'	Stadium: Městský stadion Attendance: 1,000; Referee: Tomáš Klíma

26 February 2022 23	Slovan Liberec	1–1	Jablonec	Liberec
15:00 CET (UTC+1)	Rabušic 54' (pen.)	Report	Černák 77'	Stadium: Stadion u Nisy; Attendance: 3,489; Referee: Ondřej Berka

6 March 2022 24	Jablonec	1–1	Hradec Králové	Jablonec nad Nisou
15:00 CET (UTC+1)	Ikaunieks 89'	Report	Kubala 70'	Stadium: Stadion Střelnice; Attendance: 1,485; Referee: Zbyněk Proske

9 March 2022 22	Jablonec	1–1	Sparta Prague	Jablonec nad Nisou
18:30 CET (UTC+1)	Silný 81'	Report	Čvančara 85'	Stadium: Stadion Střelnice; Attendance: 2,416; Referee: Dalibor Černý
Note: The match was originally scheduled for 20 February 2022, but was postponed due to snow.

13 March 2022 25	České Budějovice	2–0	Jablonec	České Budějovice
15:00 CET (UTC+1)	Čolić 5'; Mic. Škoda 43'	Report		Stadium: Stadion Střelecký ostrov Attendance: 2,854; Referee: Tomáš Batík

19 March 2022 26	Jablonec	0–0	Viktoria Plzeň	Jablonec nad Nisou
18:00 CET (UTC+1)		Report		Stadium: Stadion Střelnice; Attendance: 2,175; Referee: Jan Machálek

3 April 2022 27	Pardubice	1–1	Jablonec	Prague
16:00 CEST (UTC+2)	Huf 48'	Report	Malínský 36'	Stadium: Ďolíček (Note: Pardubice continued playing their home matches in Ďolíček due to the rebuilding of their own stadium Pod Vinicí.); Attendance: 665; Referee: Miroslav Zelinka

10 April 2022 28	Jablonec	1–1	Fastav Zlín	Jablonec nad Nisou
16:00 CEST (UTC+2)	Ikaunieks 72'	Report	Hloušek 5'	Stadium: Stadion Střelnice; Attendance: 1,630; Referee: Ladislav Szikszay

17 April 2022 29	Jablonec	1–2	Slavia Prague	Jablonec nad Nisou
17:00 CEST (UTC+2)	Krob 87'	Report	Schranz 31'; Tecl 84'	Stadium: Stadion Střelnice; Attendance: 4,056; Referee: Petr Hocek

20 April 2022 30	Baník Ostrava	1–0	Jablonec	Ostrava
18:00 CEST (UTC+2)	Buchta 11'	Report		Stadium: Městský stadion Attendance: 4,098; Referee: Tomáš Batík

==== Relegation group ====
23 April 2022 31	Jablonec	0–1	Pardubice	Jablonec nad Nisou
17:00 CEST (UTC+2)		Report	Solil 71'	Stadium: Stadion Střelnice; Attendance: 1,613; Referee: Zbyněk Proske

1 May 2022 32	Jablonec	2–0	Karviná	Jablonec nad Nisou
16:00 CEST (UTC+2)	Martinec 15'; Zelený 42'	Report		Stadium: Stadion Střelnice; Attendance: 1,701; Referee: Miroslav Zelinka

7 May 2022 33	Teplice	0–1	Jablonec	Teplice
16:00 CEST (UTC+2)		Report	Kubista 28'	Stadium: Na Stínadlech; Attendance: 2,107; Referee: Marek Radina

10 May 2022 34	Jablonec	1–1	Bohemians 1905	Jablonec nad Nisou
19:00 CEST (UTC+2)	Pilař 38'	Report	Hronek 90+3'	Stadium: Stadion Střelnice; Attendance: 2,578; Referee: Ladislav Szikszay

14 May 2022 35	Fastav Zlín	1–1	Jablonec	Zlín
18:00 CEST (UTC+2)	Procházka 50'	Report	Ikaunieks 37'	Stadium: Letná Stadion; Attendance: 3,211; Referee: Dalibor Černý

=== Czech Cup ===
22 September 2021 Third round	Přepeře	0–1	Jablonec	Přepeře
15:30 CEST (UTC+2)	Nešpor 55'	Report		Stadium: Hřiště FK Přepeře; Referee: Jan Machálek

11 November 2021 Fourth round	Jablonec	4–0	Varnsdorf	Jablonec nad Nisou
15:00 CET (UTC+1)	Doležal 38'; Kratochvíl 43' (pen.); Malínský 55'; Nešpor 89'	Report		Stadium: Stadion Střelnice; Referee: Petr Hocek

16 February 2022 Quarter-finals	Jablonec	4–0	Mladá Boleslav	Jablonec nad Nisou
14:00 CET (UTC+1)	Považanec 20'; Malínský 50', 56'; Silný 68'	Report		Stadium: Stadion Střelnice; Referee: Ondřej Berka

2 March 2022 Semi-finals	Sparta Prague	4–3 (a.e.t.)	Jablonec	Prague
18:00 CET (UTC+1)	Čvančara 45', 90+5'; L.Krejčí II 47'; Hložek 92'	Report	Malínský 35'; Kratochvíl 50'; Štěpánek 57'	Stadium: Generali Arena; Referee: Tomáš Klíma

=== UEFA Europa League ===
==== Third qualifying round ====
The draw for the third qualifying round was held on 19 July 2021.

5 August 2021 First leg	Jablonec (Czech Republic)	2–4	(Scotland) Celtic	Jablonec nad Nisou, Czech Republic
17:45 CEST (UTC+2)	Pilař 17'; Surzyn (yellow card) 75'; Bitton 85' (o.g.); Zelený (yellow card) 88'	Report	Abada 12'; Furuhashi 16'; Taylor (yellow card) 54'; Forrest 64'; Christie 90'	Stadium: Stadion Střelnice; Attendance: 4,805; Referee: Halil Umut Meler (Turkey)

12 August 2021 Second leg	Celtic (Scotland)	3–0 (7–2 agg.)	(Czech Republic) Jablonec	Glasgow, Scotland
19:45 BST (UTC+1)	Turnbull 26', 62'; Forrest 70'	Report		Stadium: Celtic Park; Attendance: 50,076; Referee: Daniel Siebert (Germany)

=== UEFA Europa Conference League ===
==== Play-off round ====
The draw for the play-off round was held on 2 August 2021.

19 August 2021 First leg	Jablonec (Czech Republic)	5–1	(Slovakia) Žilina	Jablonec nad Nisou, Czech Republic
20:00 CEST (UTC+2)	Kratochvíl 10', 22'; Doležal 41'; Považanec 45+1'; Martinec 90'	Report	Jibril 75'	Stadium: Stadion Střelnice; Attendance: 4,378; Referee: Jakob Kehlet (Denmark)

26 August 2021 Second leg	Žilina (Slovakia)	0–3 (1–8 agg.)	(Czech Republic) Jablonec	Žilina, Slovakia
18:00 CEST (UTC+2)		Report	Pleštil 30'; Vaníček 86'; Čvančara 88'	Stadium: Štadión pod Dubňom; Attendance: 3,122; Referee: Kristo Tohver (Estonia)

==== Group stage ====
Pos	Team	Pld	W	D	L	GF	GA	GD	Pts	Qualification	AZ	RAN	JAB	CLJ
1	(Netherlands) AZ	6	4	2	0	8	3	+5	14	Advance to round of 16	—	1–0	1–0	2–0
2	(Denmark) Randers	6	1	4	1	9	9	0	7	Advance to knockout round play-offs	2–2	—	2–2	2–1
3	(Czech Republic) Jablonec	6	1	3	2	6	8	−2	6		1–1	2–2	—	1–0
4	(Romania) CFR Cluj	6	1	1	4	4	7	−3	4		0–1	1–1	2–0	—

Source: UEFA
Rules for classification: Group stage tiebreakers

16 September 2021 1	Jablonec (Czech Republic)	1–0	(Romania) CFR Cluj	Jablonec nad Nisou, Czech Republic
21:00 CEST (UTC+2)	Pilař 51' (pen.)	Report		Stadium: Stadion Střelnice; Attendance: 2,470; Referee: Enea Jorgji (Albania)

30 September 2021 2	AZ (Netherlands)	1–0	(Czech Republic) Jablonec	Alkmaar, Netherlands
18:45	Guðmundsson 53'	Report		Stadium: AFAS Stadion; Attendance: 9,071; Referee: Rade Obrenovič (Slovenia)

21 October 2021 3	Jablonec (Czech Republic)	2–2	(Denmark) Randers	Jablonec nad Nisou, Czech Republic
21:00 CEST (UTC+2)	Čvančara 35', 53'	Report	Odey 36', 90' (pen.)	Stadium: Stadion Střelnice; Attendance: 3,678; Referee: Aliyar Aghayev (Azerbaijan)

4 November 2021 4	Randers (Denmark)	2–2	(Czech Republic) Jablonec	Randers, Denmark
18:45	Hammershøy-Mistrati 46'; Kubista 53' (o.g.)	Report	Čvančara 73'; Kratochvíl 83'	Stadium: Randers Stadium; Attendance: 4,071; Referee: Orel Grinfeld (Israel)

25 November 2021 5	Jablonec (Czech Republic)	1–1	(Netherlands) AZ	Jablonec nad Nisou, Czech Republic
21:00 CET (UTC+1)	Kratochvíl 7'	Report	Evjen 44'	Stadium: Stadion Střelnice; Attendance: 2,650; Referee: Manuel Schüttengruber (Austria)

9 December 2021 6	CFR Cluj (Romania)	2–0	(Czech Republic) Jablonec	Cluj-Napoca, Romania
19:45 EET (UTC+2)	Debeljuh 45', 82'	Report		Stadium: Stadionul Dr. Constantin Rădulescu; Attendance: 2,400; Referee: Harm Osmers (Germany)
