= 2024–25 FK Jablonec season =

Jablonec
2024–25 season
- Manager: Luboš Kozel
- Stadium: Stadion Střelnice
- Czech First League: 6th
- Czech Cup: Second round
- Top goalscorer: League: Dominik Hollý (3); All: Dominik Hollý (3)
- Average home league attendance: 3,007
- All statistics correct as of 28 September 2024.

The 2024–25 season is the 79th season in the history of FK Jablonec, and the 31st consecutive season in Czech First League. In addition to the domestic league, the team is scheduled to participate in the Czech Cup.

After one season, Radoslav Látal was sacked on 7 June 2024. Luboš Kozel became the new manager on 17 June 2024, after managing Slovan Liberec last season.

== Squad ==
As of 27 September 2024.

Note: Flags indicate national team as defined under FIFA eligibility rules; some limited exceptions apply. Players may hold more than one non-FIFA nationality.

No.	Pos.	Nation	Player
1	GK	CZE	Jan Hanuš
2	DF	COL	Haiderson Hurtado
4	DF	SRB	Nemanja Tekijaški (captain)
5	DF	CZE	David Štěpánek
6	MF	CZE	Michal Beran
7	MF	GEO	Vakhtang Chanturishvili
8	MF	BRA	Dudu Nardini
10	MF	CZE	Jan Suchan
11	MF	CZE	Jan Fortelný
14	DF	CZE	Daniel Souček
18	DF	CZE	Martin Cedidla
19	FW	CZE	Jan Chramosta
20	FW	BDI	Bienvenue Kanakimana

No.	Pos.	Nation	Player
21	MF	CZE	Matěj Polidar (on loan from Sparta Prague)
22	DF	CZE	Jakub Martinec
24	FW	CZE	David Puškáč
25	MF	SVK	Sebastian Nebyla
26	MF	SVK	Dominik Hollý
32	FW	CZE	Oliver Velich
33	GK	CZE	Albert Kotlín
36	FW	CZE	Tomáš Schánělec (on loan from Sparta Prague)
37	FW	CZE	Matouš Krulich
77	FW	CMR	Alexis Alégué
95	MF	CZE	Michal Černák
99	GK	SLO	Klemen Mihelak

== Transfers ==
=== In ===
Pos.	Player	Transferred from	Fee	Date	Source
MF	(Brazil) Eduardo Nardini	(Cyprus) Othellos Athienou FC	Free	10 July 2024	
GK	(Slovakia) Klemen Mihelak	(Slovenia) Mura	Undisclosed	22 July 2024	

=== Out ===
Pos.	Player	Transferred to	Fee	Date	Source
MF	(Czech Republic) Dominik Pleštil	(Czech Republic) Bohemians 1905	End of contract	1 July 2024	
FW	(Czech Republic) Václav Drchal	(Czech Republic) Bohemians 1905		1 July 2024	
MF	(Czech Republic) Miloš Kratochvíl	(Slovakia) Spartak Trnava	Undisclosed	3 July 2024	

== Friendlies ==
21 June 2024 Friendly	Benátky nad Jizerou (Czech Republic)	0–3	(Czech Republic) Jablonec	Benátky nad Jizerou
17:30			Puškáč 5', 37'; Polidar 80' (pen.)	Stadium: Městský stadion

25 June 2024 Friendly	Jablonec (Czech Republic)	1–1	(Czech Republic) Žižkov	Jablonec nad Nisou
17:00	Cedidla 13'		Wesolowsky 75'	Stadium: Stadion Jiskra Mšeno

30 June 2024 Friendly	Jablonec (Czech Republic)	v	(Romania) Universitatea Craiova
17:00

30 June 2024 Friendly	Botoșani (Romania)	3–2	(Czech Republic) Jablonec	Fulpmes, Austria
17:00	Țigănusu 21'; Mailat 30'; Friday 75'		Puškáč 14', 42'	Stadium: Sportplatz Fulpmes

3 July 2024 Friendly	Jablonec (Czech Republic)	0–1	(Croatia) Osijek	Irschen, Austria
18:00			Mikolčić 80'	Stadium: Sportplatz Askö Irschen

6 July 2024 Friendly	Wacker Innsbruck (Austria)	0–7	(Czech Republic) Jablonec	Rio di Pusteria, Italy
16:00			Hollý; Tekijaški; Fortelný; Puškáč; Alégué	Stadium: Campo da calcio Valles

13 July 2024 Friendly	Jablonec (Czech Republic)	4–1	(Czech Republic) Sparta Prague B	Jablonec nad Nisou
15:00	Nebyla 34', 45+2'; Alégué 43'; Puškáč 72'		Šiler 75'	Stadium: Stadion Střelnice

11 January 2025 Friendly	Jablonec (Czech Republic)	5–2	(Czech Republic) Příbram	Jablonec nad Nisou
11:00	Dominik Breda 18'; Chramosta 22'; Alégué 42'; Suchan 53'; Kanakimana 77'	Report	Emmanuel Tolno 5'; Silvano 37'	Stadium: Stadion Střelnice

18 January 2025 Friendly	Jablonec (Czech Republic)	1–1	(Japan) Sanfrecce Hiroshima	Jablonec nad Nisou
13:00	Tekijaški 54'	Report	56' (pen.)	Stadium: Stadion Střelnice

21 January 2025 Friendly	Jablonec (Czech Republic)	2–1	(Hungary) Kecskemét	Jablonec nad Nisou
14:00	Ševčík 55'; Suchan 89'	Report	Márton Vattay 82'	Stadium: Stadion Střelnice

25 January 2025 Friendly	Jablonec (Czech Republic)	3–1	(Ukraine) Polissya	Jablonec nad Nisou
13:00	Puškáč 20'; Ševčík 78'; Kanakimana 81'	Report	Lyednyev 84'	Stadium: Stadion Střelnice

== Competitions ==
=== Overall record ===
Competition	First match	Last match	Starting round	Final position	Record							
Competition	First match	Last match	Starting round	Final position	Pld	W	D	L	GF	GA	GD	Win %
Czech First League regular season	20 July 2024	19 April 2025	Matchday 1	5th	30	15	6	9	47	25	+22	50.00
Czech First League championship round	27 April 2024	25 May 2025	Matchday 1		2	2	0	0	5	2	+3	100.00
Czech Cup	2 October 2024		Second round		0	0	0	0	0	0	+0	—
Total					32	17	6	9	52	27	+25	53.13

Last updated: 28 September 2024
Source: Soccerway

=== Czech First League ===
==== Regular season ====
Pos	Team	Pld	W	D	L	GF	GA	GD	Pts	Qualification or relegation
3	Baník Ostrava	30	20	4	6	52	26	+26	64	Qualification for the championship group
4	Sparta Prague	30	19	5	6	56	33	+23	62	Qualification for the championship group
5	Jablonec	30	15	6	9	47	25	+22	51	Qualification for the championship group
6	Sigma Olomouc	30	12	7	11	46	41	+5	43	Qualification for the championship group
7	Slovan Liberec	30	11	9	10	45	31	+14	42	Qualification for the middle group

Source: Chance Liga
Rules for classification: 1) Points; 2) Head-to-head points; 3) Head-to-head goal difference; 4) Head-to-head goals scored; 5) Goal difference; 6) Goals scored; 7) Fair-play ranking; 8) Draw.

==== Results summary ====
Overall								Home						Away					
Pld	W	D	L	GF	GA	GD	Pts	W	D	L	GF	GA	GD	W	D	L	GF	GA	GD
9	4	2	3	9	5	+4	14	2	1	1	5	2	+3	2	1	2	4	3	+1

Last updated: 28 September 2024.
Source: Chance Liga

===== Results by round =====
Round	1	2	3	4	5	6	7	8	9	10	11	12	13	14	15	16	17	18	19	20	21	22	23	24	25	26	27	28	29	30
Ground	H	A	H	A	H	A	A	H	A	H	A	H	A	H	A	H	A	H	A	H	H	A	H	A	H	A	H	A	H	A
Result	W	L	D	W	L	W	D																							
Position	3	7	7	4	8	4	4																							
Points	3	3	4	7	7	10	11																							

Updated to match(es) played on 1 September 2024. Source: Chance Liga
A = Away; H = Home; W = Win; D = Draw; L = Loss

===== Matches =====
The match schedule was released on 20 June 2024.

20 July 2024 1	Jablonec	2–0	Mladá Boleslav	Jablonec nad Nisou
14:30 CEST (UTC+2)	Hollý 31'; Alégué (yellow card) 54'; Chanturishvili 80'; Fortelný (yellow card) 85'	Report	Sakala (yellow card) 15' (yellow-red card) 45+3'; Suchý (yellow card) 72' (yellow-red card) 73'; Kušej (yellow card) 86'	Stadium: Stadion Střelnice; Attendance: 3,301; Referee: Marek Radina

28 July 2024 2	Baník Ostrava	1–0	Jablonec	Ostrava
17:00 CEST (UTC+2)	Adediran (yellow card) 26'; Aririerisim (yellow card) 41'; Ewerton 53'	Report	Polidar (yellow card) 4'; Čech (goalkeeper coach) (yellow card) 70'	Stadium: Městský stadion Attendance: 7,912; Referee: Karel Rouček

3 August 2024 3	Jablonec	0–0	Viktoria Plzeň	Jablonec nad Nisou
17:00 CEST (UTC+2)	Beran (yellow card) 38'; Alégué (yellow card) 61'; Martinec (yellow card) 65'; Nardini (yellow card) 79'	Report	Dweh (yellow card) 70'	Stadium: Stadion Střelnice; Attendance: 3,511; Referee: Jan Všetečka

10 August 2024 4	Dukla Prague	0–2	Jablonec	Prague
14:30 CEST (UTC+2)	Peterka (yellow card) 72'; Hašek (yellow card) 84'	Report	Hollý 45+1'; Kanakimana 89'	Stadium: Stadion Juliska; Attendance: 2,684; Referee: Pavel Orel

17 August 2024 5	Jablonec	1–2	Sparta Prague	Jablonec nad Nisou
20:00 CEST (UTC+2)	Tekijaški (yellow card) 40'; Čech (goalkeeper coach) (yellow card) 55'; Hollý (yellow card) 73'; Martinec 88'	Report	Haraslín 38'; Tuci 68'; Wiesner (yellow card) 73'	Stadium: Stadion Střelnice; Attendance: 5,500; Referee: Jan Machálek

24 August 2024 6	Bohemians 1905	1–2	Jablonec	Prague
14:30 CEST (UTC+2)	Helal 14' (pen.)	Report	Hollý 35'; Kanakimana 58'; Nebyla (yellow card) 65'; Tekijaški (yellow card) 74'; Krulich (yellow card) 86'	Stadium: Ďolíček; Attendance: 4,228; Referee: Lukáš Nehasil

31 August 2024 7	Slovácko	0–0	Jablonec	Uherské Hradiště
17:00 CEST (UTC+2)	Kohút (yellow card) 5'; Daníček (yellow card) 68'	Report	Čech (goalkeeper coach) (yellow card) 50'; Martinec (yellow card) 58'	Stadium: Městský fotbalový stadion Miroslava Valenty; Attendance: 4,257; Referee: Ladislav Szikszay

21 September 2024 9	Karviná	1–0	Jablonec	Karviná
16:00 CEST (UTC+2)	Vecheta 22'; Moses (yellow card) 42'; Samko (yellow card) 54'; Krčík (yellow card) 57'; Bielan (assistant manager) (yellow card) 77'; Svozil (yellow card) 79'; Lapeš (yellow card) 90+5'	Report	Nebyla (yellow card) 51'; Martinec (yellow card) 62'; Tekijaški (yellow card) 75'; Chanturishvili (yellow card) 79'	Stadium: Městský stadion Attendance: 2,735; Referee: Karel Rouček

28 September 2024 10	Jablonec	2–0	Hradec Králové	Jablonec nad Nisou
19:00 CEST (UTC+2)	Chanturishvili (yellow card) 18'; Nebyla (yellow card) 23'; Beran 64'; Polidar 78'; Hollý (yellow card) 86'; Alégué (yellow card) 90+6'	Report	Samek (yellow card) 15'; Petrášek (yellow card) 26'; Pilař (red card) 33'; Horejš (manager) (yellow card) 63'; Krejčí (yellow card) 90+4'	Stadium: Stadion Střelnice; Attendance: 2,342; Referee: Ladislav Szikszay

5 October 2024 11	Slovan Liberec	0–5	Jablonec	Liberec
19:00 CEST (UTC+2)	Tupta (yellow card) 38'; Pourzitidis (yellow card) 60'; Frýdek (red card) 74'	Report	Ševínský 17' (o.g.); Kanakimana 49'; Hollý (yellow card) 57'; Nebyla 58'; Martinec 61'; Alégué 90+3'	Stadium: Stadion u Nisy; Attendance: 4,069; Referee: (Czech Republic) Jan Všetečka

20 October 2024 12	Jablonec	1–2	Slavia Prague	Jablonec nad Nisou
18:30 CEST (UTC+2)	Chanturishvili 66'	Report	Michez 18'; Lingr 61'	Stadium: Stadion Střelnice; Attendance: 5,237; Referee: (Czech Republic) Karel Rouček

26 October 2024 13	Sigma Olomouc	0–0	Jablonec	Olomouc
19:00 CEST (UTC+2)	Jan Fiala (yellow card) 22'; Breite (red card) 45+5'; Matěj Mikulenka (yellow card) 45+9'; Adam Dohnálek (yellow card) 69'; Jiří Spáčil (yellow card) 85'	Report	Nebyla (yellow card) 45+9'; Cedidla (yellow card) 64'	Stadium: Andrův stadion Attendance: 3,120; Referee: (Czech Republic) Ladislav Szikszay

2 November 2024 14	Jablonec	3–0	Teplice	Jablonec nad Nisou
16:00 CET (UTC+1)	Chramosta 10'; Polidar 37'; Dudu Nardini 48'; Chanturishvili (yellow card) 90+3'	Report	Filip Horský (yellow card) 27'; Jakub Urbanec (yellow card) 64'; Marek Beránek (yellow card) 90+3'	Stadium: Stadion Střelnice; Attendance: 2,275; Referee: (Czech Republic) Jan Všetečka

9 November 2024 15	Pardubice	2–0	Jablonec	Pardubice
16:00 CET (UTC+1)	Lurvink (yellow card) 40'; Ladislav Krobot 53'; Leipold 79'	Report	Nebyla (red card) 70'; Souček (yellow card) 76'; Cedidla (yellow card) 82'	Stadium: CFIG Arena; Attendance: 2,107; Referee: (Czech Republic) Jan Petřík

23 November 2024 16	Jablonec	3–1	Baník Ostrava	Jablonec nad Nisou
13:30 CET (UTC+1)	Alégué 45' 84'; Tekijaški 55'; Martinec (yellow card) 60'; Dudu Nardini (yellow card) 61'; Beran (yellow card) 71'	Report	Rigo (yellow card) 17' (goal) 35'; Emmanuel Uchena (yellow card) 28'	Stadium: Stadion Střelnice; Attendance: 2,863; Referee: (Czech Republic) Karel Rouček

1 December 2024 17	Viktoria Plzeň	3–2	Jablonec	Plzeň
18:30 CET (UTC+1)	Marković (yellow card) 15'; Vydra (yellow card) 45+4' (goal) 75'; Šulc 70' (pen.); Jemelka (yellow card) 77'; Kalvach 80'	Report	Alégué 2'; Hollý (yellow card) 17'; Nebyla (yellow card) 29' (goal) 45+2' (pen.); Souček (yellow card) 37'; Cedidla (red card) 68'	Stadium: Doosan Arena; Attendance: 6,084; Referee: (Czech Republic) Dominik Starý

4 December 2024 8	Jablonec	5–0	České Budějovice	Jablonec nad Nisou
17:00 CET (UTC+1)	Martinec 1'; Chramosta 17' (pen.) 30'; Puškáč 20'; Matouš Ladislav Krulich 88'	Report	Jan Brabec (yellow card) 69'	Stadium: Stadion Střelnice; Attendance: 2,026; Referee: (Czech Republic) Vít Zaoral
Note: The 8th round was postponed due to the threat of flood.

8 December 2024 18	Jablonec	2–1	Dukla Prague	Jablonec nad Nisou
13:00 CET (UTC+1)	Nebyla 16'; Chramosta 33'; Cedidla (yellow card) 88'	Report	David Ludvíček 36'	Stadium: Stadion Střelnice; Attendance: 1,833; Referee: (Czech Republic) Petr Hocek

15 December 2024 19	Sparta Prague	2–1	Jablonec	Prague
13:00 CET (UTC+1)	Rrahmani (yellow card) 39' (goal) 51'; Suchomel (yellow card) 55'; Olatunji 78'	Report	Hollý 34'	Stadium: epet ARENA; Attendance: 15,963; Referee: (Czech Republic) Lukáš Nehasil

1 February 2025 20	Jablonec	v	Bohemians 1905	Jablonec nad Nisou
CET (UTC+1)				Stadium: Stadion Střelnice

8 February 2025 21	Jablonec	v	Slovácko	Jablonec nad Nisou
CET (UTC+1)				Stadium: Stadion Střelnice

15 February 2025 22	České Budějovice	v	Jablonec	České Budějovice
CET (UTC+1)				Stadium: Stadion Střelecký ostrov

22 February 2025 23	Jablonec	v	Karviná	Jablonec nad Nisou
CET (UTC+1)				Stadium: Stadion Střelnice

1 March 2025 24	Hradec Králové	v	Jablonec	Hradec Králové
CET (UTC+1)				Stadium: Malšovická aréna

8 March 2025 25	Jablonec	v	Slovan Liberec	Jablonec nad Nisou
CET (UTC+1)				Stadium: Stadion Střelnice

15 March 2025 26	Slavia Prague	v	Jablonec	Prague
CET (UTC+1)				Stadium: Fortuna Arena

29 March 2025 27	Jablonec	v	Sigma Olomouc	Jablonec nad Nisou
CET (UTC+1)				Stadium: Stadion Střelnice

5 April 2025 28	Teplice	v	Jablonec	Teplice
CEST (UTC+2)				Stadium: Na Stínadlech

12 April 2025 29	Jablonec	v	Pardubice	Jablonec nad Nisou
CEST (UTC+2)				Stadium: Stadion Střelnice

19 April 2025 30	Mladá Boleslav	v	Jablonec	Mladá Boleslav
CEST (UTC+2)				Stadium: Lokotrans Aréna

==== Championship round ====
Pos	Team	Pld	W	D	L	GF	GA	GD	Pts	Qualification or relegation
1	Slavia Prague (C)	35	29	3	3	77	18	+59	90	Qualification for the Champions League league phase
2	Viktoria Plzeň	35	23	5	7	71	36	+35	74	Qualification for the Champions League second qualifying round
3	Baník Ostrava	35	22	5	8	58	34	+24	71	Qualification for the Europa League second qualifying round
4	Sparta Prague	35	19	6	10	61	44	+17	63	Qualification for the Conference League second qualifying round
5	Jablonec	35	19	6	10	60	33	+27	63	
6	Sigma Olomouc	35	12	9	14	48	53	−5	45	Qualification for the Europa League play-off round (Note: The winner of the 2024–25 Czech Cup (Sigma Olomouc) qualifies for the Europa League play-off round.)

Source: Chance Liga
Rules for classification: 1) Total points; 2) Points earned in regular season; 3) Head-to-head points (regular season); 4) Head-to-head goal difference (regular season); 5) Head-to-head goals scored (regular season); 5) Goal difference (all matches); 6) Goals scored (all matches); 7) Fair-play ranking; 8) Draw.
(C) Champions

=== Czech Cup ===
2 October 2024 Second round	Jiskra Domažlice	0–2	Jablonec	Domažlice
16:00 CEST (UTC+2)	Václav Svoboda (yellow card) 35'; Kryštof Pavlík (yellow card) 58'; Radim Řezník (yellow card) 62'	Report	Alégué 38'; Tomáš Schánělec 53'; Souček (yellow card) 66'	Stadium: Stadion Střelnice; Attendance: 503; Referee: (Czech Republic) Dominik Starý

5 November 2024 Third round	Uherský Brod	0–1	Jablonec	Uherský Brod
15:00 CET (UTC+1)	Jakub Obdrzalek (yellow card) 66'	Report	Hurtado 6'; Tomáš Schánělec (yellow card) 68'; Polidar (yellow card) 90+1'	Stadium: Orelský stadion Attendance: 551; Referee: (Czech Republic) Jan Machálek
