= 2021–22 Czech Cup =

MOL Cup

Tournament details
- Country: Czech Republic
- Teams: 126

Final positions
- Champions: Slovácko (1st title)
- Runners-up: Sparta Prague

Tournament statistics
- Matches played: 124

The 2021–22 Czech Cup, known as the MOL Cup for sponsorship reasons, was the 29th season of the annual knockout football tournament of the Czech Republic. It began with the first round on 23 July 2021.

== Teams ==
Round	Clubs remaining	Clubs involved	Winners from previous round	New entries this round	Leagues entering at this round
Preliminary round	126	46	none	46	Bohemian Football League; Moravian–Silesian Football League; Levels 4 and 5 in football league pyramid
First round	103	86	23	63	Czech 2. Liga; Bohemian Football League; Moravian–Silesian Football League
Second round	59	54	42	12	Czech First League – teams not playing in UEFA competitions
Third round	32	32	27	5	Czech First League – teams entered into UEFA competitions
Fourth round	16	16	16	none	none
Quarter-finals	8	8	8	none	none
Semi-finals	4	4	4	none	none
Final	2	2	2	none	none

== Preliminary round ==
Team 1	Score	Team 2
23 July 2021
MFK Havířov	2–3 (a.e.t.)	FC Vratimov
TJ Slovan Bzenec	1–3	ČSK Uherský Brod
FC Slovan Havlíčkův Brod	0–3	FC Velké Meziříčí
FC TVD Slavičín	3–1	SFK ELKO Holeśov
24 July 2021
FK Nový Jičín	0–1	TJ Valašské Meziříčí
SK Jiskra Rýmařov	2–4	SK Uničov
SK Beskyd Frenštát pod Radhoštěm	2–3 (a.e.t.)	MFK Frýdek-Místek
1. BFK Frýdlant nad Ostravicí	0–1	MFK Vítkovice
TJ Sokol Lanžhot	1–2	FK Hodonín
FK Nové Sady	2–3 (a.e.t.)	1. FC Viktorie Přerov
TJ Skaštice	2–1	1. HFK Olomouc
TJ Sokol Tasovice	0–1	TJ Start Brno
FC Žďas Žďár nad Sázavou	5–2	SK Tatran Ždírec nad Doubravou
SK Hranice	6–1	TJ Tatran Všechovice
FC PBS Velká Bíteš	1–3 (a.e.t.)	FK Blansko
25 July 2021
FK Bohumín	1–0	SK Dětmarovice
FC Slavoj Olympia Bruntál	1–3	FK Šumperk
FK Kozlovice	4–0	FC Heřmanice Slezská
AFC Humpolec	1–1 (2–3 p)	TJ Slavoj TKZ Polná
FK SK Polanka nad Odrou	3–0 w/o	FC Dolní Benešov
FSC Stará Říše	0–5	1. SC Znojmo FK
FC Strání	3–0	MSK Břeclav
31 July 2021
FC Vsetín	0–1	ŠSK Bílovec

== First round ==
Team 1	Score	Team 2
10 August 2021
TJ Spartak Soběslav	1–2	SK Benešov
FC Chomutov	3–2 (a.e.t.)	FK Motorlet Prague
11 August 2021
SFC Opava	9–0	FK Bohumín
1. SC Znojmo FK	1–6	SK Líšeň
ŠSK Bílovec	1–4	SK Uničov
FK Olympie Březová	w/o	FK Králův Dvůr
TJ Slavoj TKZ Polná	0–4	FC Vysočina Jihlava
FK Admira Prague	0–1	1. FK Příbram
SK Aritma Prague	0–1	Povltavská fotbalová akademie
FK Brandýs nad Labem	0–5	FK Chlumec nad Cidlinou
SK Český Brod	1–4	Loko Vltavín
MFK Dobříš	1–3	Sokol Hostouň
TJ Dvůr Králové	0–5	SK Zápy
FK Komárov	1–8	FK Viktoria Žižkov
FK Kozlovice	1–8	FC Hlučín
FK Hodonín	1–2	MFK Vyškov
SK Kladno	0–7	TJ Jiskra Domažlice
FK Kolín	1–0	FC Slavia Karlovy Vary
SK Kosmonosy	1–3	FK Dukla Prague
FK OEZ Letohrad	0–4	FK Přepeře
SK Libčany	1–4	FK Zbuzany
FC Viktoria Mariánské Lázně	1–1 (2–4 p)	FC Písek
FK Meteor Prague VIII	2–3	FK Baník Sokolov
FK Náchod	0–2	MFK Chrudim
FK Neratovice–Byškovice	0–4	FK Varnsdorf
1. FC Viktorie Přerov	5–0	FK SK Polanka nad Odrou
TJ Tatran Sedlčany	3–3 (4–3 p)	FC MAS Táborsko
SK Slaný	1–4	Slovan Velvary
FC TVD Slavičín	3–2 (a.e.t.)	MFK Frýdek-Místek
TJ Sokol Srbice	0–3	FC Slavoj Vyšehrad
TJ Start Brno	0–2	FK Blansko
FC Strání	2–4	SK Hanácká Slavia Kroměříž
FK Šumperk	0–7	FK Fotbal Třinec
SK Tochovice	1–1 (1–4 p)	FK Baník Souš
ČSK Uherský Brod	2–1 (a.e.t.)	FC Viktoria Otrokovice
Český lev - Union Beroun	0–11	FC Sellier & Bellot Vlašim
TJ Valašské Meziříčí	4–2	TJ Skaštice
FC Velké Meziříčí	4–2 (a.e.t.)	FC Slovan Rosice
MFK Vítkovice	2–2 (4–3 p)	SK Hranice
SK Vysoké Mýto	0–2	TJ Jiskra Ústí nad Orlicí
FC Žďas Žďár nad Sázavou	0–4	FC Zbrojovka Brno
18 August 2021
FC Vratimov	2–3	1. SK Prostějov
FK Velké Hamry	1–2	FK Ústí nad Labem

== Second round ==
The draw took place on August 17, 2021.

Team 1	Score	Team 2
24 August 2021
FK Mladá Boleslav	3–0	FC Slavoj Vyšehrad
FK Přepeře	6–0	FC Písek
ČSK Uherský Brod	1–2	FC Vysočina Jihlava
25 August 2021
SK Benešov	0–1	FK Teplice
TJ Jiskra Domažlice	1–7	FC Sellier & Bellot Vlašim
FC Hlučín	0–1 (a.e.t.)	FC Baník Ostrava
Sokol Hostouň	0–1 (a.e.t.)	FK Pardubice
SK Hanácká Slavia Kroměříž	2–2 (4–5 p)	FC Zbrojovka Brno
TJ Tatran Sedlčany	0–6	SK Dynamo České Budějovice
FC TVD Slavičín	1–5	MFK Karviná
FK Baník Sokolov	0–6	Bohemians 1905
SK Uničov	2–4	SK Sigma Olomouc
TJ Jiskra Ústí nad Orlicí	0–2	MFK Vyškov
TJ Valašské Meziříčí	0–3	1. SK Prostějov
Slovan Velvary	3–1	FC Chomutov
Povltavská fotbalová akademie	0–5	FK Varnsdorf
FC Slovan Liberec	1–2	FK Zbuzany
1 September 2021
FK Blansko	1–4	FC Fastav Zlín
FK Kolín	1–2	FK Dukla Prague
FK Olympie Březová	0–2	FC Hradec Králové
1. FC Viktorie Přerov	0–2	SK Líšeň
2 September 2021
SK Zápy	1–1 (4–2 p)	FK Viktoria Žižkov
7 September 2021
FK Baník Souš	0–1	1. FK Příbram
8 September 2021
Loko Vltavín	3–2	FK Ústí nad Labem
FK Chlumec nad Cidlinou	0–1 (a.e.t.)	MFK Chrudim
MFK Vítkovice	0–3	FK Fotbal Třinec
14 September 2021
FC Velké Meziříčí	0–5	SFC Opava

== Third round ==
The draw took place on September 10, 2021.

Team 1	Score	Team 2
21 September 2021
FC Sellier & Bellot Vlašim	1–2	SK Sigma Olomouc
FC Vysočina Jihlava	2–0	FK Pardubice
SFC Opava	2–4	FK Mladá Boleslav
FC Viktoria Plzeň	2–1	1. FK Příbram
22 September 2021
MFK Karviná	1–0	MFK Chrudim
FK Přepeře	0–1	FK Jablonec
1. SK Prostějov	0–4	Bohemians 1905
FK Fotbal Třinec	0–1	FK Teplice
SK Zápy	0–4	FC Hradec Králové
FK Zbuzany	1–2	1. FC Slovácko
Loko Vltavín	2–5 (a.e.t.)	FC Baník Ostrava
SK Líšeň	0–3	AC Sparta Prague
Slovan Velvary	2–4	SK Slavia Prague
6 October 2021
FK Dukla Prague	1–3	SK Dynamo České Budějovice
FK Varnsdorf	4–2 (a.e.t.)	FC Zbrojovka Brno
7 October 2021
MFK Vyškov	1–2 (a.e.t.)	FC Fastav Zlín

== Fourth round ==
The draw took place on October 14, 2021.

Team 1	Score	Team 2
26 October 2021
Bohemians 1905	1–0	FC Vysočina Jihlava
27 October 2021
FC Baník Ostrava	1–2	FC Hradec Králové
FK Teplice	0–2	AC Sparta Prague
FK Mladá Boleslav	2–0	FC Viktoria Plzeň
11 November 2021
FK Jablonec	4–0	FK Varnsdorf
12 November 2021
1. FC Slovácko	3–1	MFK Karviná
23 November 2021
SK Dynamo České Budějovice	1–1 (4–5 p)	SK Sigma Olomouc
15 December 2021
SK Slavia Prague	3–1	FC Fastav Zlín

== Quarter-finals ==
9 February 2022	SK Sigma Olomouc	0–0 (a.e.t.) (2–4 p)	1. FC Slovácko	Olomouc
14:30				Stadium: Andrův stadion Attendance: 640; Referee: Dalibor Černý
	Penalties
	Greššák (penalty scored); Vepřek (penalty scored); Zifčák (penalty missed); Daněk (penalty missed)		(penalty scored) Daníček; (penalty scored) Levin; (penalty scored) Havlík; (penalty scored) Vecheta

9 February 2022	SK Slavia Prague	0–2	AC Sparta Prague	Prague
17:00			Krejčí II 10'; Pešek 26'	Stadium: Sinobo Stadium; Attendance: 1,000; Referee: Pavel Orel

15 February 2022	FC Hradec Králové	2–1 (a.e.t.)	Bohemians 1905	Mladá Boleslav
16:00	Prekop 90+5'; Vašulín 106'		Puškáč 9'	Stadium: Lokotrans Aréna; Attendance: 350; Referee: Tomáš Klíma

16 February 2022	FK Jablonec	4–0	FK Mladá Boleslav	Jablonec nad Nisou
14:00	Považanec 20'; Malínský 50', 56'; Silný 68'			Stadium: Stadion Střelnice; Attendance: 1,000; Referee: Ondřej Berka

== Semi-finals ==
2 March 2022	AC Sparta Prague	4–3	FK Jablonec	Prague
18:00	Čvančara 45', 90+5'; Krejčí II 47'; Hložek 92'		Malínský 35'; Kratochvíl 50'; Štěpánek 57'	Stadium: Generali Česká pojišťovna Arena; Attendance: 4,986; Referee: Tomáš Klíma

25 March 2022	FC Hradec Králové	0–1	1. FC Slovácko	Mladá Boleslav
17:00			Šašinka 36'	Stadium: Lokotrans Aréna; Attendance: 1,230; Referee: Ladislav Szikszay

== Final ==
18 May 2022	1. FC Slovácko	3–1	AC Sparta Prague	Uherské Hradiště
17:00	Jurečka 11' (pen.); Reinberk 33', 43'		Hancko 42'	Stadium: Městský fotbalový stadion Miroslava Valenty; Attendance: 7,991; Referee: Ladislav Szikszay
