= Jakub Martinec (footballer) =

Czech footballer (born 1998)

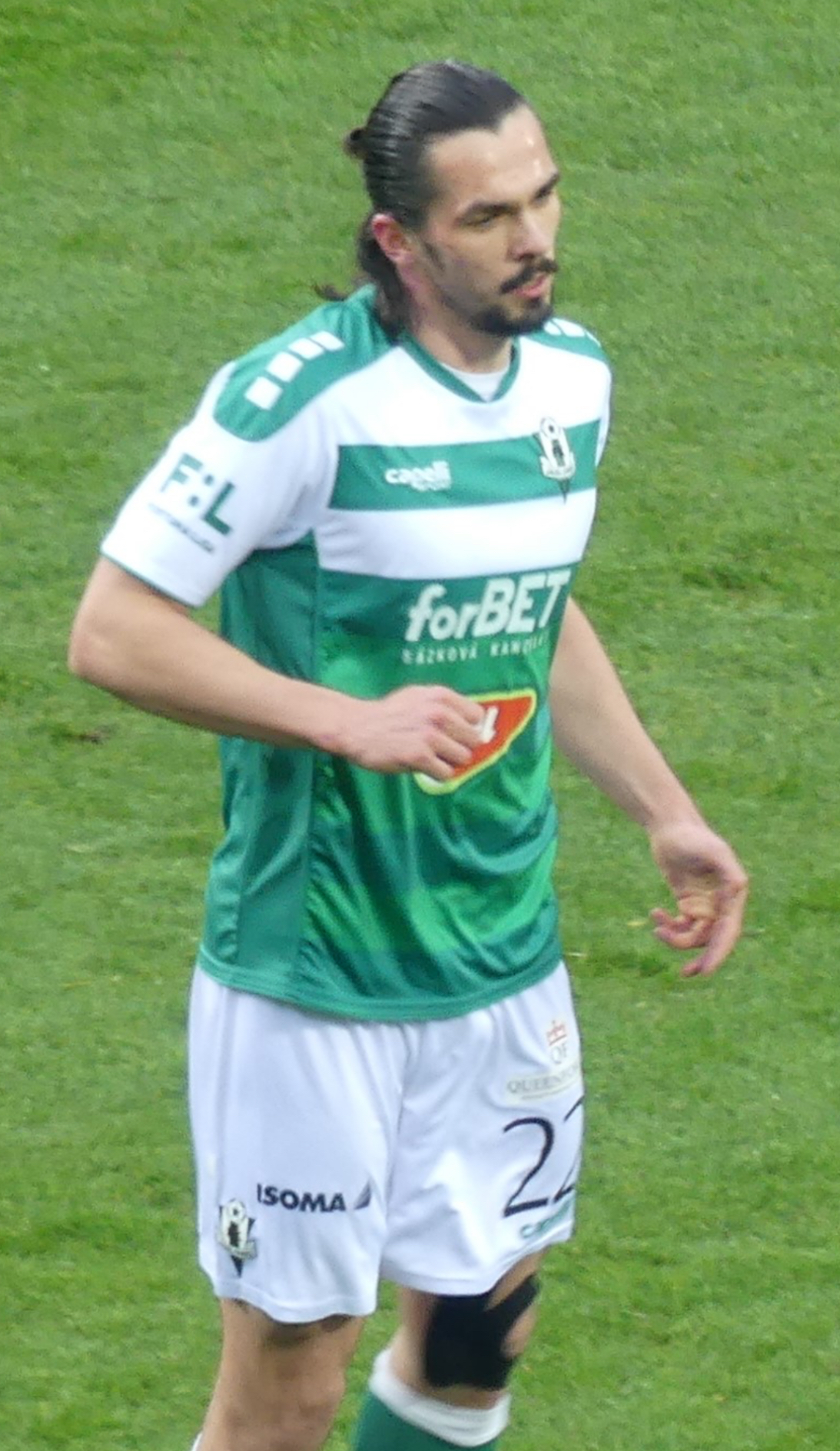
- Martinec with Jablonec in 2023

Personal information
- Date of birth: 13 March 1998 (age 28)
- Place of birth: Vysoké Mýto, Czech Republic
- Height: 1.87 m (6 ft 2 in)
- Position: Defender

Team information
- Current team: Sparta Prague
- Number: 4

Senior career*
Years	Team	Apps	(Gls)
2018–2020	Hradec Králové	47	(5)
2020–2025	Jablonec	134	(11)
2025–	Sparta Prague	16	(1)

International career^{‡}
2013	Czech Republic U16	2	(0)
2014	Czech Republic U17	2	(0)
- * Club domestic league appearances and goals as of 27 May 2026 ‡ National team caps and goals as of 11:20, 27 September 2024 (UTC)

Jakub Martinec (born 13 March 1998) is a Czech professional footballer who plays as a defender for Czech First League club Sparta Prague. He represented Czech Republic at youth level.

== Career ==
Martinec captained Czech National Football League club Hradec Králové in his final season there.

On 11 August 2020, he signed a 3-year contract with Czech First League side Jablonec.

Martinec said in an interview, he didn't celebrated his goal out of respect, when he scored a goal against his former club Hradec Králové on 11 September 2022.

On 5 September 2025, Martinec signed a multi-year contract with Czech First League club Sparta Prague.

== Career statistics ==
=== Club ===
As of match played 21 September 2024

Appearances and goals by club, season and competition
Club	Season	League			National cup (Note: Includes Czech Cup)		Europe		Total	
Club	Season	Division	Apps	Goals	Apps	Goals	Apps	Goals	Apps	Goals
Hradec Králové	2018–19	Czech National Football League	22	2	—		—		22	2
Hradec Králové	2019–20	Czech National Football League	25	3	1	0	—		26	3
Hradec Králové	Total		47	5	1	0	—		48	5
Jablonec	2020–21	Czech First League	22	0	—		1 (Note: Appearances in UEFA Europa League)	0	23	0
Jablonec	2021–22	Czech First League	28	1	3	0	6 (Note: Two appearances in UEFA Europa League, four appearances and one goal in UEFA Europa Conference League)	1	37	2
Jablonec	2022–23	Czech First League	21	2	1	1	—		22	3
Jablonec	2023–24	Czech First League	28	4	2	0	—		30	4
Jablonec	2024–25	Czech First League	8	1	0	0	—		8	1
Jablonec	Total		107	8	6	1	7	1	120	10
Career total			154	13	7	1	7	1	168	15
