= Michal Beran (footballer) =

Czech footballer

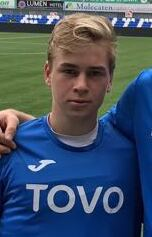
- Beran at his trial with PEC Zwolle at MAC³PARK Stadion

Personal information
- Date of birth: 22 August 2000 (age 26)
- Place of birth: Czech Republic
- Height: 1.67 m (5 ft 6 in)
- Position: Midfielder

Team information
- Current team: Sigma Olomouc
- Number: 47

Senior career*
Years	Team	Apps	(Gls)
2019–2020	Slovan Liberec	12	(1)
2019	Slovan Liberec B	12	(1)
2020–2024	Slavia Prague	6	(0)
2020	→ Slovan Liberec (loan)	10	(0)
2021	→ Pardubice (loan)	12	(0)
2022–2024	→ Bohemians 1905 (loan)	71	(1)
2022	→→ Bohemians 1905 B (loan)	1	(0)
2024–2025	Jablonec	42	(1)
2025–	Sigma Olomouc	25	(1)

International career^{‡}
2015	Czech Republic U15	2	(1)
2016	Czech Republic U16	1	(0)
2020–2022	Czech Republic U21	4	(0)
2025–	Czech Republic	3	(0)
- * Club domestic league appearances and goals as of 27 May 2026 ‡ National team caps and goals as of 13 November 2025

Michal Beran (born 22 August 2000) is a Czech footballer who plays as a midfielder for Sigma Olomouc and the Czech Republic national team.

== Career ==
After traveling to the Netherlands in 2018 with Johnny Reynolds to have a trial with PEC Zwolle, Beran signed for Slovan Liberec for the 2018–19 season, with Reynolds signing for ADO Den Haag.

On 21 June 2024, Beran signed a three-year contract with Jablonec. On 2 September 2025, Beran signed a five-year contract with Sigma Olomouc. One week later, on 8 September, Beran debuted for the Czech Republic national football team in a 1–1 friendly draw against Saudi Arabia.

== Career statistics ==
=== Club ===
As of match played 9 November 2025

Appearances and goals by club, season and competition
Club	Season	League			Cup		Europe		Other		Total	
Club	Season	Division	Apps	Goals	Apps	Goals	Apps	Goals	Apps	Goals	Apps	Goals
Slovan Liberec	2019–20	Czech First League	12	1	4	0	—		—		16	1
Slovan Liberec B	2019–20	Czech National Football League	12	0	—		—		—		12	0
Slavia Prague	2020–21	Czech First League	6	0	2	0	—		—		8	0
Slovan Liberec (loan)	2020–21	Czech First League	10	0	0	0	8 (Note: Appearances in UEFA Europa League)	0	—		18	0
Pardubice (loan)	2021–22	Czech First League	12	0	1	0	—		—		13	0
Bohemians 1905 (loan)	2021–22	Czech First League	16	0	1	0	—		—		17	0
Bohemians 1905 (loan)	2022–23	Czech First League	24	0	4	0	—		—		28	0
Bohemians 1905 (loan)	2023–24	Czech First League	31	1	2	0	2 (Note: Appearances in UEFA Conference League)	0	—		35	1
Bohemians 1905 (loan)	Total		71	1	7	0	2	0	—		80	1
Bohemians 1905 B (loan)	2022–23	Czech National Football League	2	0	—		—		—		2	0
Jablonec	2024–25	Czech First League	35	1	2	0	—		—		37	1
Jablonec	2025–26	Czech First League	7	0	1	1	—		—		8	1
Jablonec	Total		42	1	3	1	—		—		45	2
Sigma Olomouc	2025–26	Czech First League	8	0	1	0	3	0	—		12	0
Career total			175	3	18	1	13	0	0	0	206	4

=== International ===
As of match played 13 November 2025

Appearances and goals by national team and year
National team	Year	Apps	Goals
Czech Republic	2025	3	0
Total		3	0
