= Martin Cedidla =

Czech footballer (born 2001)

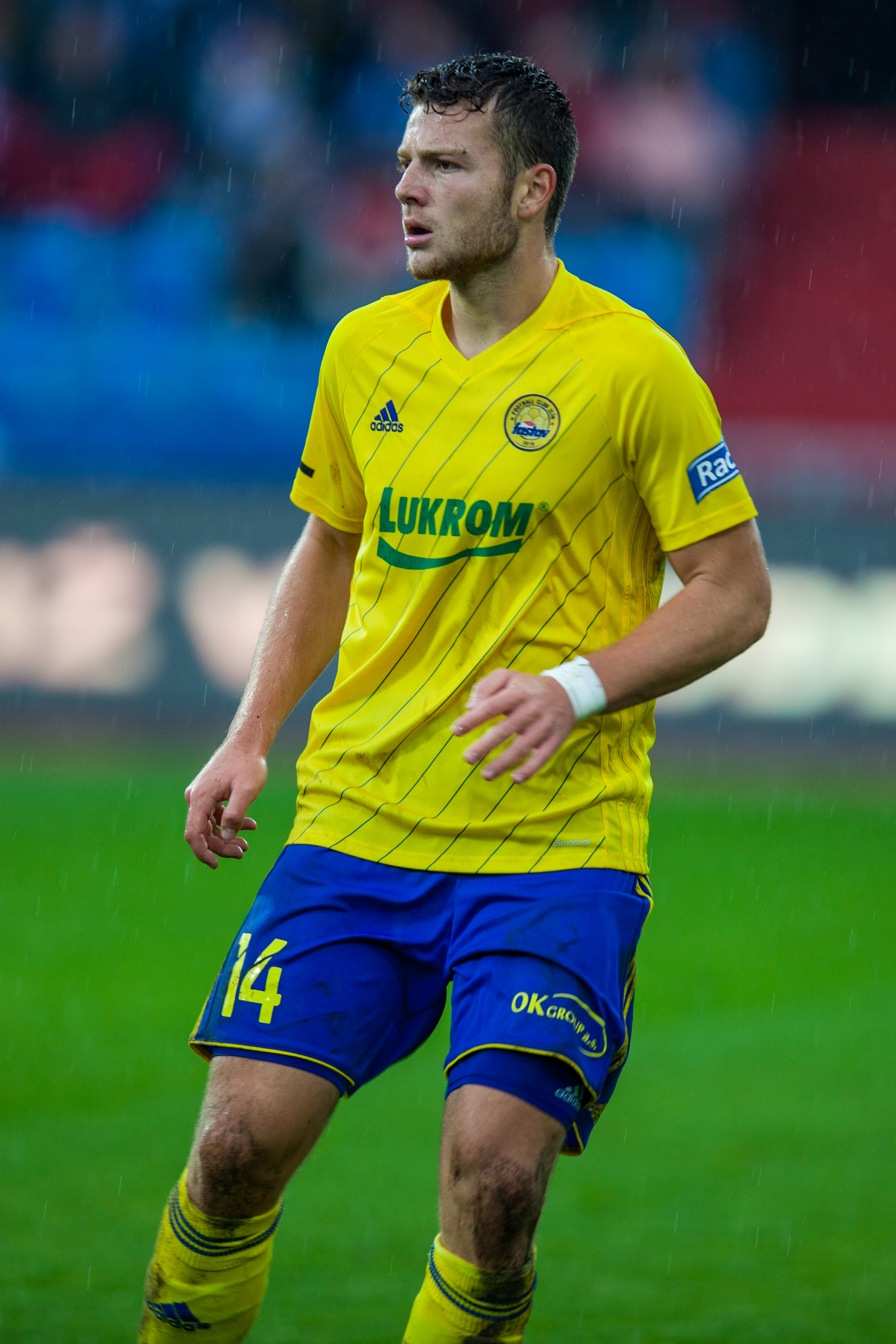

Personal information
- Date of birth: 22 November 2001 (age 24)
- Place of birth: Czech Republic
- Height: 1.85 m (6 ft 1 in)
- Position: Right-back

Team information
- Current team: FK Jablonec
- Number: 18

Youth career
- Zlín

Senior career*
Years	Team	Apps	(Gls)
2019–2024	Zlín	139	(4)
2024–	Jablonec	65	(3)

International career^{‡}
2019	Czech Republic U18	5	(0)
2019–2020	Czech Republic U19	7	(0)
2021	Czech Republic U20	1	(0)
2022–2023	Czech Republic U21	6	(0)
2025–	Czech Republic	1	(0)
- * Club domestic league appearances and goals as of 27 May 2026 ‡ National team caps and goals as of 11 May 2026

Martin Cedidla (born 22 November 2001) is a Czech professional footballer who plays as a defender for FK Jablonec and the Czech Republic national team.

== Club career ==
Cedidla played for all the youth teams of FC Zlín. He made his Czech First League debut for Zlín on 27 April 2019, at the age of 17, in their 3–0 away loss against Mladá Boleslav. Since then, Cedidla has played regularly for Zlín and at the age of 21 has already played over 100 league matches. On 10 May 2026, at the age of 24, Cedidla became the youngest player in the history of the Czech First League with 200 matches played.

On 18 August 2022, Cedidla was banned for five matches by LFA Disciplinary commission after he injured Ewerton in the match against Slavia Prague.

== International career ==
Cedidla played for the U18–U21 Czech Republic national teams. His six appearances for the Czech Republic U21 team included one match at the 2023 UEFA European Under-21 Championship. On 8 September 2025, he debuted for the Czech Republic national football team in a 1–1 friendly draw against Saudi Arabia.
