= Daniel Souček =

Czech footballer (born 1998)

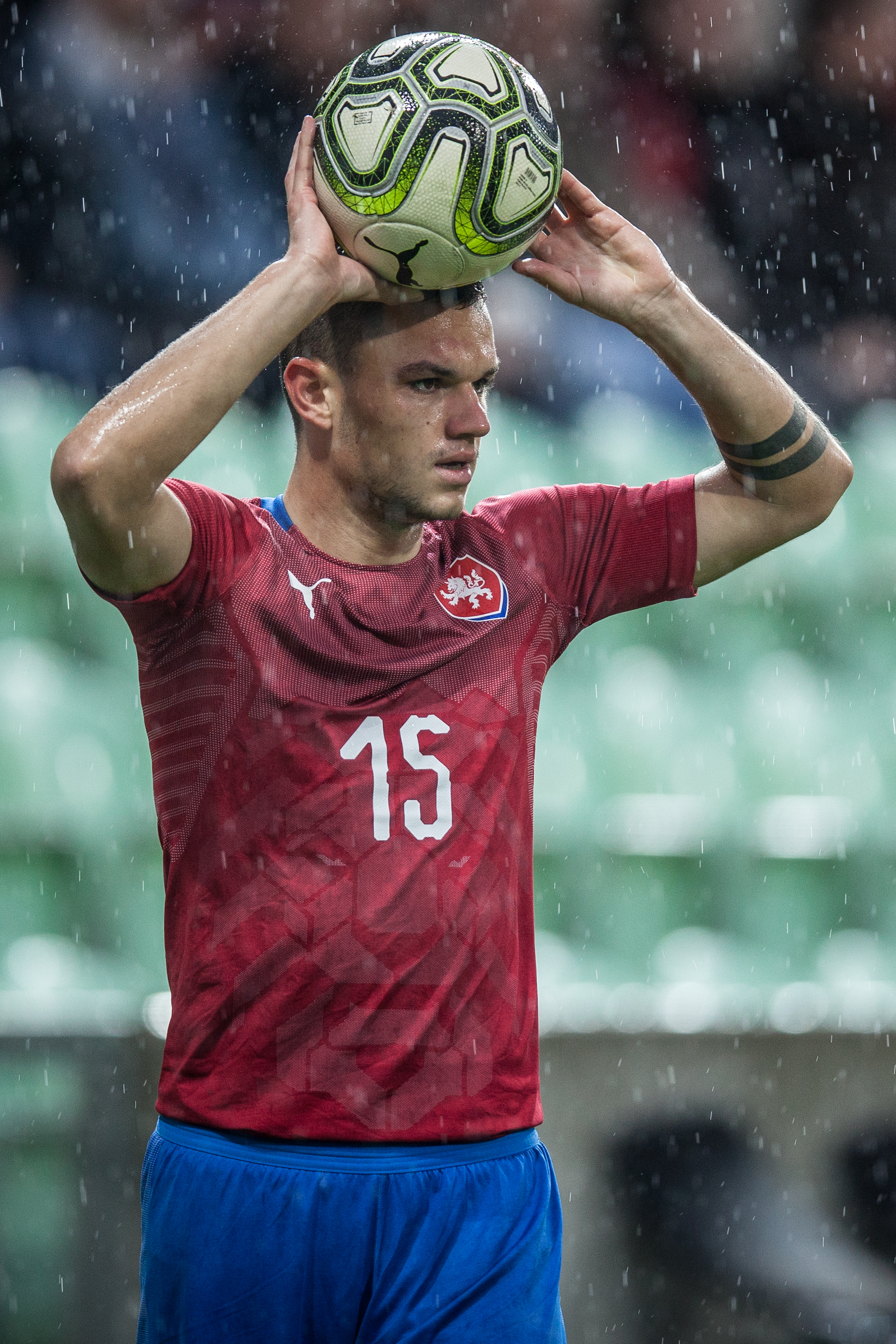
- Souček with the Czech Republic in 2019

Personal information
- Date of birth: 18 July 1998 (age 28)
- Position: Defender

Team information
- Current team: Jablonec
- Number: 14

Youth career
- Slavia Prague

Senior career*
Years	Team	Apps	(Gls)
2017–2018	Slavia Prague	0	(0)
2017–2018	→ Táborsko (loan)	27	(0)
2018–2023	Dukla Prague	48	(2)
2022–2023	→ Jablonec (loan)	24	(1)
2023–	Jablonec	57	(0)

International career^{‡}
2014	Czech Republic U16	3	(0)
2014	Czech Republic U17	4	(0)
2015	Czech Republic U18	5	(0)
2016–2017	Czech Republic U19	5	(0)
2017–2018	Czech Republic U20	6	(0)
- * Club domestic league appearances and goals as of 27 May 2026 ‡ National team caps and goals as of 31 December 2018

Daniel Souček (born 18 July 1998) is a Czech professional footballer who plays as a defender for Jablonec.

He made his league debut in Táborsko's Czech National Football League 1–1 draw at FC Hradec Králové on 28 July 2017. He played for the Czech Republic under-20 national team in the 2017–18 Under 20 Elite League.
