= Tomáš Malínský =

Czech footballer

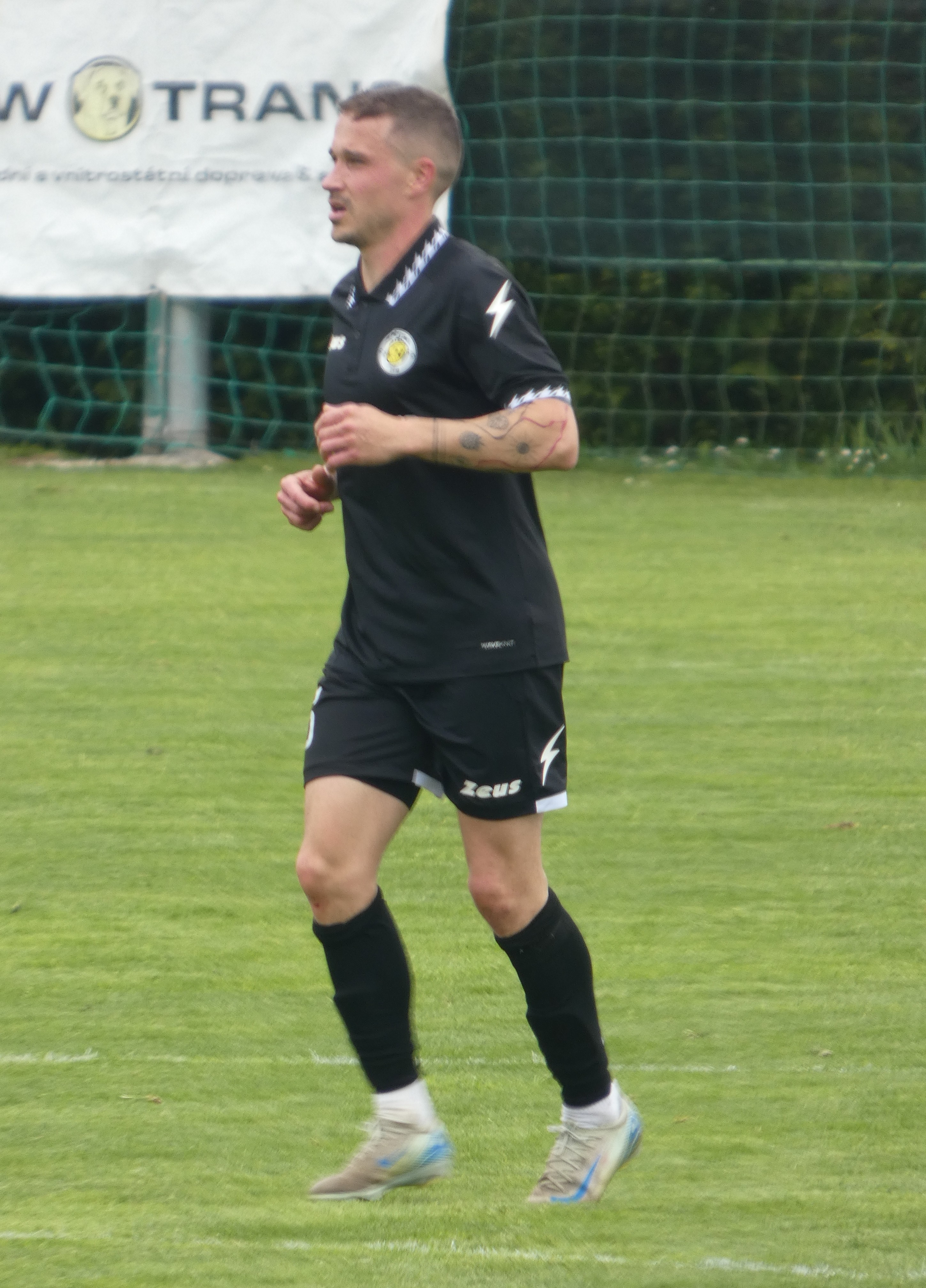

Personal information
- Date of birth: 25 August 1991 (age 35)
- Place of birth: Skuteč, Czechoslovakia
- Height: 1.70 m (5 ft 7 in)
- Positions: Winger; forward

Youth career
- Hradec Králové

Senior career*
Years	Team	Apps	(Gls)
2011–2017	Hradec Králové	127	(14)
2017–2020	Slovan Liberec	61	(9)
2020–2022	Slavia Prague	4	(0)
2021	→ Mladá Boleslav (loan)	13	(0)
2021–2022	→ Jablonec (loan)	29	(3)
2022–2023	Jablonec	8	(0)

International career
2020	Czech Republic	1	(0)
- * Club domestic league appearances and goals

Tomáš Malínský (born 25 August 1991) is a Czech retired professional footballer. He spent most of his career in FC Hradec Králové and FC Slovan Liberec. Malínský made one appearance for the Czech Republic national football team.

== Career ==
In July 2020, Malínský was one of four Liberec players to join Slavia Prague. The same year on 7 September, he made his debut for the Czech senior squad in a 2020–21 UEFA Nations League match against Scotland.

On 14 January 2021, he moved to Mladá Boleslav on loan until the end of the season. Malínský last played for Jablonec. Due to a serious injury, he ended his professional career in 2023 and retrained as a barber.

== Career statistics ==
As of 5 June 2022

Club	Season	League			Cup		Continental		Other		Total	
Club	Season	Division	Apps	Goals	Apps	Goals	Apps	Goals	Apps	Goals	Apps	Goals
Hradec Králové	2011–12	Fortuna liga	17	0	0	0	—		—		17	0
Hradec Králové	2012–13	Fortuna liga	6	0	0	0	—		—		6	0
Hradec Králové	2013–14	Fortuna národní liga	27	7	1	0	—		—		28	7
Hradec Králové	2014–15	Fortuna liga	22	1	3	0	—		—		25	1
Hradec Králové	2015–16	Fortuna národní liga	28	2	3	0	—		—		31	2
Hradec Králové	2016–17	Fortuna liga	27	4	2	0	—		—		29	4
Hradec Králové	Total		127	14	9	0	—		—		136	14
Slovan Liberec	2017–18	Fortuna liga	4	0	2	0	—		—		6	0
Slovan Liberec	2018–19	Fortuna liga	25	2	1	0	—		—		26	2
Slovan Liberec	2019–20	Fortuna liga	32	7	5	0	—		—		37	7
Slovan Liberec	Total		61	9	8	0	—		—		69	9
Slavia Prague	2020–21	Fortuna liga	4	0	0	0	3	0	—		7	0
Mladá Boleslav (loan)	2020–21	Fortuna liga	13	0	1	0	—		—		14	0
Jablonec (loan)	2020–21	Fortuna liga	29	3	4	4	10	0	—		43	7
Career total			234	26	22	4	13	0	0	0	269	30

=== International ===
As of 7 September 2020

Czech Republic
Year	Apps	Goals
2020	1	0
Total	1	0
