= Jan Krob =

Czech footballer (born 1987)

Personal information
- Full name: Jan Krob
- Date of birth: 27 April 1987 (age 39)
- Place of birth: Beroun, Czechoslovakia
- Height: 1.76 m (5 ft 9 in)
- Position: Left back

Youth career
- 1992–1999: FK Králův Dvůr
- 1999–2005: Sparta Prague

Senior career*
Years	Team	Apps	(Gls)
2005–2012	Sparta Prague	8	(0)
2008	→ Kladno (loan)	11	(1)
2009–2010	→ České Budějovice (loan)	21	(0)
2011–2012	→ Tatran Prešov (loan)	26	(1)
2012	→ Vlašim (loan)	7	(2)
2013–2014	Tatran Prešov	9	(0)
2013–2014	→ Teplice (loan)	24	(0)
2014–2019	Teplice	134	(6)
2019–2023	Jablonec	89	(4)

International career
2008	Czech Republic U21	2	(0)

Managerial career
- 2023–: Jablonec (assistant)
- * Club domestic league appearances and goals as of 25 May 2023

Jan Krob (born 27 April 1987 in Beroun) is a Czech former professional footballer who last played for Jablonec. His former clubs were among others Vlašim and Teplice. He represented his country at under-21 level.
