= Michal Černák =

Czech footballer

Personal information
- Date of birth: 1 September 2003 (age 23)
- Place of birth: Czech Republic
- Height: 1.74 m (5 ft 9 in)
- Position: Midfielder

Team information
- Current team: Dukla Prague
- Number: 95

Youth career
- 2013–2020: Jablonec

Senior career*
Years	Team	Apps	(Gls)
2019–	Jablonec B	36	(2)
2020–2025	Jablonec	66	(3)
2025–	Dukla Prague	17	(1)

International career^{‡}
2018	Czech Republic U15	2	(0)
2018–2019	Czech Republic U16	9	(1)
2019–2020	Czech Republic U17	9	(0)
2021–2022	Czech Republic U19	7	(0)
2022	Czech Republic U20	2	(0)
2023–	Czech Republic U21	1	(0)
- * Club domestic league appearances and goals as of 15 May 2026 ‡ National team caps and goals as of 11 September 2023

Michal Černák (born 1 September 2003) is a Czech footballer who currently plays as a midfielder for Dukla Prague.

On 6 June 2025, Černák signed a multi-year contract with Dukla Prague as a free agent.

== Career statistics ==
=== Club ===
As of 10 November 2021.

Club	Season	League			Cup		Continental		Other		Total	
Club	Season	Division	Apps	Goals	Apps	Goals	Apps	Goals	Apps	Goals	Apps	Goals
Jablonec B	2019–20	ČFL	7	0	–		–		0	0	7	0
Jablonec B	2020–21	ČFL	4	0	–		–		0	0	4	0
Jablonec B	2021–22	ČFL	10	1	–		–		0	0	10	1
Jablonec B	Total		21	1	0	0	0	0	0	0	21	1
Jablonec	2019–20	Fortuna liga	5	0	0	0	–		0	0	5	0
Jablonec	2020–21	Fortuna liga	0	0	0	0	–		0	0	0	0
Jablonec	2021–22	Fortuna liga	0	0	0	0	–		0	0	0	0
Jablonec	Total		5	0	0	0	0	0	0	0	5	0
Career total			26	1	0	0	0	0	0	0	26	1
