= Jan Silný =

Czech footballer (born 1995)

Personal information
- Date of birth: 15 February 1995 (age 31)
- Place of birth: Uherské Hradiště, Czech Republic
- Height: 1.87 m (6 ft 2 in)
- Position: Forward

Team information
- Current team: Resovia
- Number: 69

Youth career
- 2002–2010: Sokol Jankovice
- 2010–2015: Viktoria Otrokovice

Senior career*
Years	Team	Apps	(Gls)
2015	Viktoria Otrokovice	15	(12)
2016–2017	Hanácká Slavia Kroměříž	51	(44)
2018	Baník Sokolov	11	(2)
2018–2020	Hanácká Slavia Kroměříž	45	(37)
2020–2022	Líšeň	51	(20)
2022–2023	Jablonec	14	(1)
2022–2023	→ Trinity Zlín (loan)	16	(1)
2023	→ Prostějov (loan)	12	(1)
2024	Kroměříž	9	(2)
2024–2025	Líšeň	26	(8)
2025–	Resovia	26	(4)
- * Club domestic league appearances and goals as of 16:52, 28 May 2026 (UTC)

Jan Silný (born 15 February 1995) is a Czech professional footballer who plays as a forward for Polish club Resovia.

On 15 July 2023, Silný joined Prostějov on a one-year loan.

On 7 July 2025, Silný moved to Polish third tier side Resovia on a two-year contract.
