= Jan Chramosta =

Czech footballer (born 1990)

Personal information
- Date of birth: 12 October 1990 (age 36)
- Place of birth: Prague, Czechoslovakia
- Height: 1.81 m (5 ft 11 in)
- Position: Striker

Team information
- Current team: Jablonec
- Number: 19

Youth career
- Mladá Boleslav

Senior career*
Years	Team	Apps	(Gls)
2009–2018	Mladá Boleslav	182	(49)
2014–2015	→ Viktoria Plzeň (loan)	10	(3)
2018–	Jablonec	186	(55)
2021–2022	→ Bohemians 1905 (loan)	22	(6)

International career^{‡}
2008	Czech Republic U18	4	(2)
2009	Czech Republic U19	4	(0)
2009	Czech Republic U20	2	(2)
2009–2012	Czech Republic U21	12	(12)
2025–	Czech Republic	1	(0)
- * Club domestic league appearances and goals as of 27 May 2026 ‡ National team caps and goals as of 27 April 2026

Jan Chramosta (born 12 October 1990) is a Czech footballer who plays as a striker for Jablonec and the Czech Republic national team. He scored more than 100 goals in the Czech First League and is the top scorer in the history of FK Mladá Boleslav and the third top scorer of Jablonec. In 2025, at the age of 35, he became the oldest debutant in the history of the Czech Republic national team.

== Club career ==
Chramosta grew up in FK Mladá Boleslav. His debut in the Czech First League was a 0–0 home draw against Viktoria Žižkov on 5 April 2009. In his first season, Chramosta scored five goals in nine matches and was eventually voted "Revelation of the Year" at the Golden Ball awards. He became a notable personality of the club after he played nine seasons for the club between 2009 and 2018, and with 49 goals became the best scorer in the club's first league history.

In 2018, he transferred to FK Jablonec and also became one of the top scorers in this club's history with 52 goals (as of October 2025).

On 15 February 2025, Chramosta scored his 100th league goal in a 3–2 away win against Dynamo České Budějovice.

== International career ==
He was a member of the Czech under-21 team. He represented the team at the 2011 UEFA European Under-21 Championship. He is the second best scorer of the U-21 team's history (as of 2024) with 12 goals. In June 2012, Chramosta scored all 5 goals in a 5–1 win over Andorra U21.

Chramosta was considered for the senior national team in 2012, but due to a serious knee injury and subsequent recovery, which slowed down his career, it did not happen.

On 12 October 2025, on his 35th birthday, he made his debut for the Czech Republic national team in a match against the Faroe Islands, becoming the oldest debutant in the history of the national team.
