= Miloš Kratochvíl =

Czech footballer

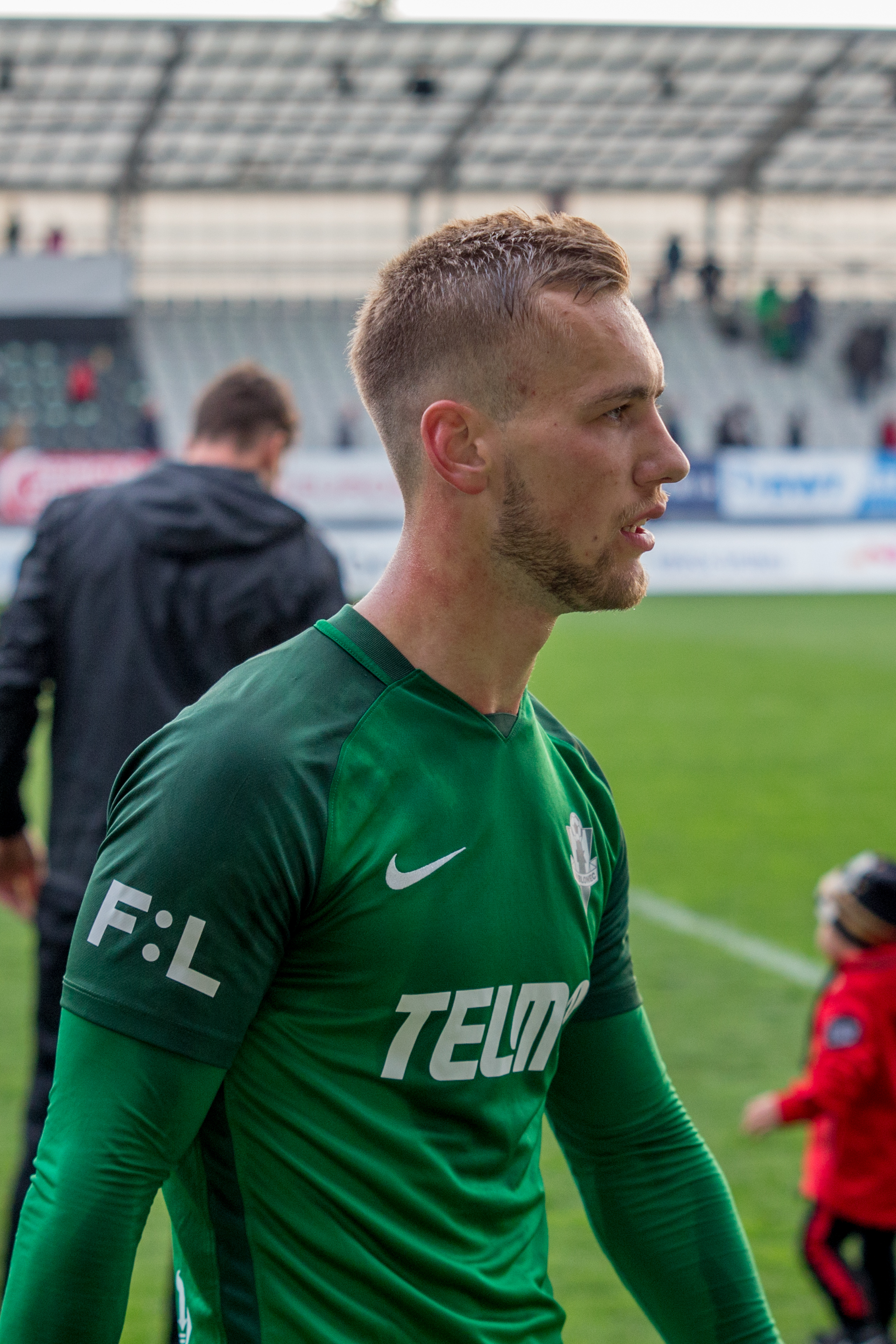

Personal information
- Date of birth: 26 April 1996 (age 30)
- Place of birth: Karlovy Vary, Czech Republic
- Height: 1.86 m (6 ft 1 in)
- Position: Midfielder

Team information
- Current team: Zlín
- Number: 27

Youth career
- 2006–2010: Slavia Karlovy Vary
- 2010–2015: Viktoria Plzeň

Senior career*
| Years | Team | Apps | (Gls) |
| 2015–2018 | Viktoria Plzeň | 0 | (0) |
| 2015–2016 | → Baník Sokolov (loan) | 34 | (7) |
| 2016–2017 | → Senica (loan) | 25 | (3) |
| 2017–2018 | → Zbrojovka Brno (loan) | 21 | (1) |
| 2018–2024 | Jablonec | 140 | (18) |
| 2024–2026 | Spartak Trnava | 48 | (5) |
| 2026– | Zlín | 0 | (0) |

International career
| 2013–2014 | Czech Republic U18 | 8 | (1) |
| 2014–2015 | Czech Republic U19 | 8 | (2) |
| 2015–2016 | Czech Republic U20 | 2 | (0) |
| 2017–2018 | Czech Republic U21 | 3 | (0) |
- * Club domestic league appearances and goals as of 16 May 2026

Miloš Kratochvíl (born 26 April 1996) is a Czech footballer who plays as a midfielder for Czech First League club Zlín.

== Club career ==
=== Viktoria Plzeň ===
In the summer of 2014, he worked his way up to the first team. He made his debut in the A-team of Plzeň on 4 November 2014 in the first match of the Czech Cup round of 16 against FC Hradec Králové (win 2:1), when he replaced Marek Bakoš in the 90th minute. Viktoria drew 0:0 in the return match at home and advanced to the quarter-finals.

=== Baník Sokolov (loan) ===
In February 2015, he went on loan to FK Baník Sokolov. He spent one and a half seasons with Baník, during which he regularly appeared and played 34 second-league matches, in which he scored seven goals.

=== Senica (loan) ===
He made his debut for Senica on 17 July 2016 in a first-round league match against ŠK Slovan Bratislava (a 0–1 loss), playing the entire match. He scored his first goal in the Slovak top flight and for Senica in a fourth-round match against 1. FC Tatran Prešov (a 4–0 win). He scored the goal in the 51st minute after a pass from Ihor Hončar, making the score 2–0.

=== Spartak Trnava ===
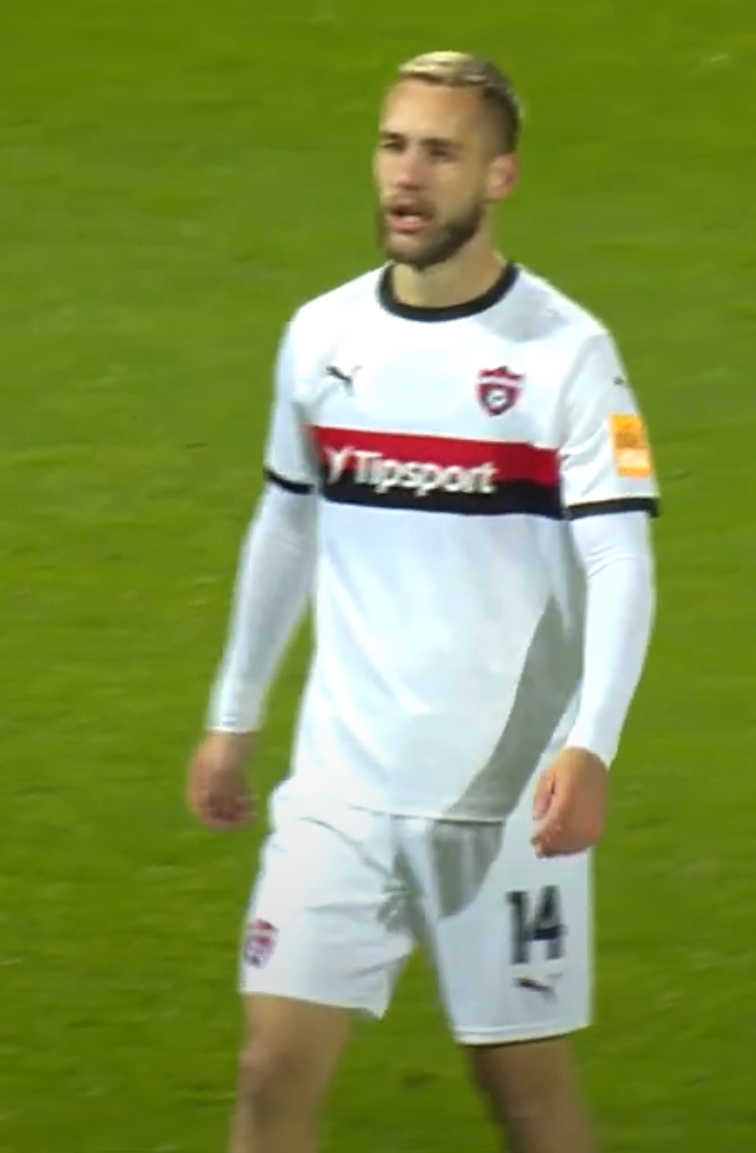
Kratochvil in a match against KFC Komárno.

On 3 July 2024, Kratochvíl joined Slovak club FC Spartak Trnava, signing a 2-year contract. He scored the winning goal in the 98” minute in a 2:1 win over KFC Komárno. Kratochvíl also scored the winning goals in a 1:0 win over FC Košice, and a 2:1 win over Železiarne Podbrezová.

=== Zlín ===
On 1 October 2026, Kratochvíl signed a contract with Czech First League club Zlín as a free agent.

== Career statistics ==
=== Club ===
As of 31 July 2025

| Club | Season | League | | | Cup | | Continental | | Other | | Total | |
| Club | Season | Division | Apps | Goals | Apps | Goals | Apps | Goals | Apps | Goals | Apps | Goals |
|---|---|---|---|---|---|---|---|---|---|---|---|---|
| Viktoria Plzeň | 2014–15 | Czech First League | — | | 1 | 0 | — | | — | | 1 | 0 |
| Baník Sokolov (loan) | 2014–15 | Fortuna národní liga | 11 | 2 | 0 | 0 | — | | — | | 11 | 2 |
| Baník Sokolov (loan) | 2015–16 | Fortuna národní liga | 23 | 5 | 0 | 0 | — | | — | | 23 | 5 |
| Senica (loan) | 2016–17 | Fortuna liga | 25 | 3 | 0 | 0 | — | | — | | 25 | 3 |
| Zbrojovka Brno (loan) | 2017–18 | Czech First League | 21 | 1 | 1 | 0 | — | | — | | 22 | 1 |
| Jablonec | 2018–19 | Czech First League | 19 | 1 | 2 | 0 | 3 | 0 | — | | 24 | 1 |
| Jablonec | 2019–20 | Czech First League | 23 | 3 | 2 | 1 | 2 | 0 | — | | 27 | 4 |
| Jablonec | 2020–21 | Czech First League | 16 | 4 | 1 | 0 | — | | — | | 17 | 4 |
| Spartak Trnava | 2024–25 | Slovak First League | 26 | 5 | - | | 2 | 0 | — | | 28 | 5 |
| Spartak Trnava | 2025-26 | Slovak First League | 1 | - | - | - | 3+1 | - | - | - | - | - |
| Career total | | | 139 | 11 | 7 | 1 | 8+1 | 0 | 0 | 0 | 150 | 20 |

== Honours ==
Spartak Trnava

- Slovak Cup: 2024–25
