= David Štěpánek =

Czech footballer

Personal information
- Date of birth: 30 May 1997 (age 29)
- Place of birth: Jihlava, Czech Republic
- Height: 1.83 m (6 ft 0 in)
- Position: Centre back

Team information
- Current team: Slovácko

Youth career
- Speřice
- Jihlava

Senior career*
Years	Team	Apps	(Gls)
2015–2019	Jihlava	55	(0)
2019–2026	Jablonec	99	(3)
2026–	Slovácko	0	(0)

International career
2013	Czech Republic U16	8	(0)
2013–2014	Czech Republic U17	12	(2)
2014–2015	Czech Republic U18	6	(0)
2015–2016	Czech Republic U19	10	(1)
2016–2017	Czech Republic U20	4	(0)
- * Club domestic league appearances and goals as of 4 February 2026

David Štěpánek (born 30 May 1997) is a Czech professional footballer who plays as a centre back for Slovácko in the Czech First League.

== Career ==
He made his career league debut for Jihlava on 23 May 2015 in a Czech First League 4–0 home win against FC Slovan Liberec.

On 10 January 2019, Štěpánek joined FK Jablonec on a contract until June 2020.

On 26 June 2026, Štěpánek signed a contract with Slovácko until summer 2028.
