= Stadion Střelnice =

Stadium in Jablonec nad Nisou, Czech Republic

- Střelnice
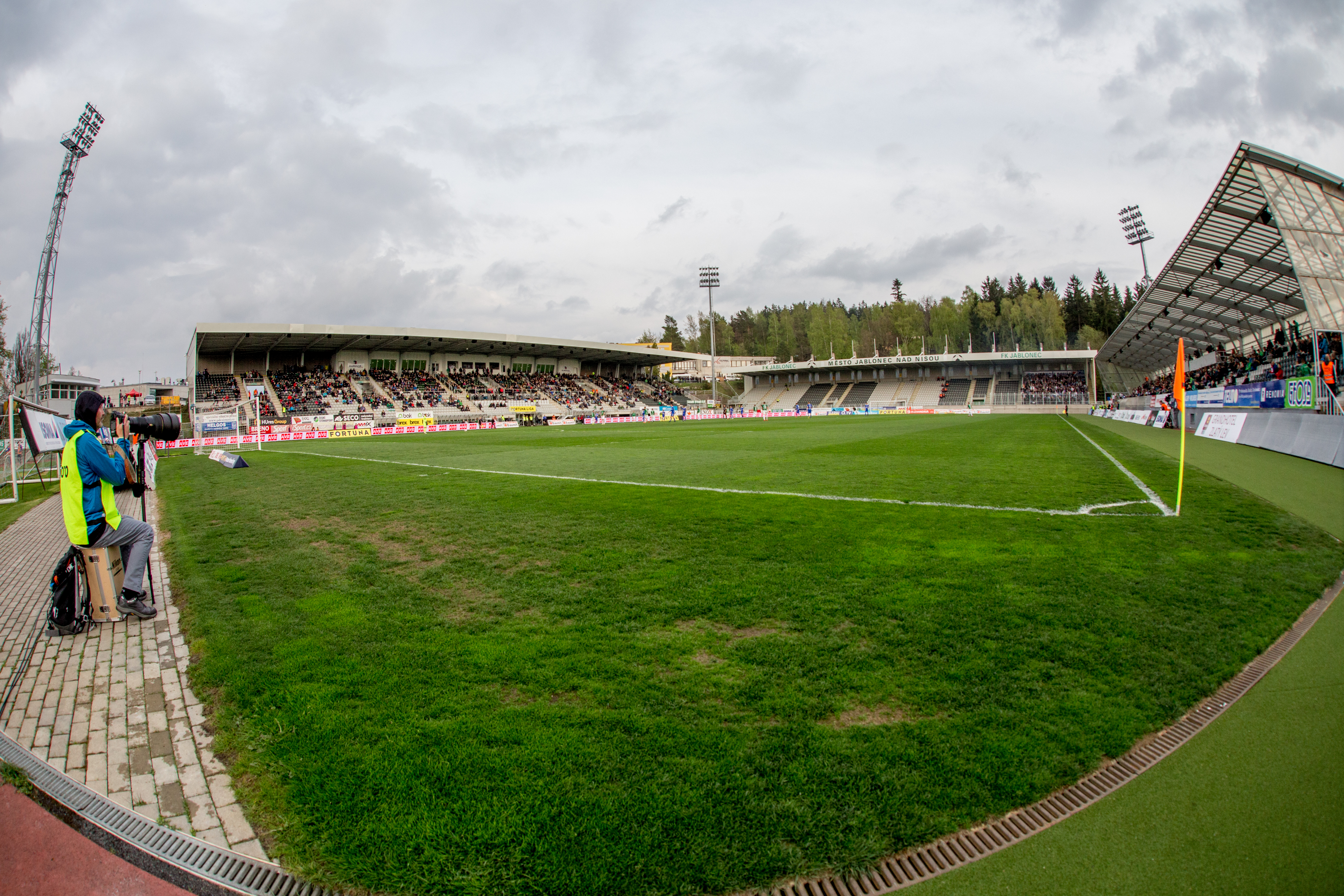
- Interactive map of Stadion Střelnice
- Former names: Chance Arena (2007–2014)
- Location: U Stadionu 4904/5, Jablonec nad Nisou, Czech Republic, 466 01
- Coordinates: 50°42′54″N 15°09′44″E
- Owner: Jablonec nad Nisou
- Capacity: 5,690
- Surface: Grass
- Field size: 105m x 68m

Construction
- Opened: 1955
- Renovated: 1964
- Closed: 2003–2006

Tenant
- FK Jablonec

The Stadion Střelnice (formerly known as Chance Arena) is a football stadium in Jablonec nad Nisou, Czech Republic. It is the home ground of FK Jablonec. The stadium's current capacity is 5,690.

The stadium was the venue for the final of the 2008 UEFA European Under-19 Football Championship, and it also hosted two earlier group games in the tournament.

== International matches ==
Stadion Střelnice has hosted three friendly matches of the Czech Republic national football team

4 September 1996 International Friendly	Czech Republic	2–1	Iceland	Jablonec, Czech Republic
Match 537/29	Kuka 54', 64' (pen.)	Report	Þ. Guðjónsson 42'	Stadium: Stadion Střelnice; Attendance: 4,528; Referee: Ziober (Poland)

30 May 2006 International Friendly	Czech Republic	1–0	Costa Rica	Jablonec, Czech Republic
Match 650/142	Lokvenc 82'	ČMFS Report		Stadium: Stadion Střelnice; Attendance: 6,244; Referee: Bede (Hungary)

5 June 2009 International Friendly	Czech Republic	1–0	Malta	Jablonec, Czech Republic
Match 686/178	Necid 77'	ČMFS Report		Stadium: Stadion Střelnice; Attendance: 6,920; Referee: Fautrel (France)
