= 2025–26 FK Jablonec season =

Jablonec
2025–26 season
- Chairman: Petr Flodrman
- Manager: Luboš Kozel
- Stadium: Stadion Střelnice
- Czech First League: 5th
- Czech Cup: Runners-up
- Top goalscorer: League: Jan Chramosta (10); All: Jan Chramosta (12)
- Highest home attendance: 6,108 v Slavia Prague (3 March 2026, Czech Cup)
- Lowest home attendance: 1,583 v Dukla Prague (28 October 2025, Czech Cup)
- Average home league attendance: 2,976
- Biggest win: 3–0 v Admira Prague (Away, 26 August 2025, Czech Cup); 3–0 v Zlín (Away, 4 April 2026, Czech First League); 4–1 v Baník Ostrava (Home, 11 April 2026, Czech First League)
- Biggest defeat: 0–5 v Viktoria Plzeň (Away, 17 May 2026, Czech First League)
Home colours	Away colours

The 2025–26 season was the 79th season in the history of Fotbalový Klub Jablonec, and the 32nd consecutive season in the Czech First League. In addition to the domestic league, Jablonec participated in the Czech Cup.

== Squad ==
Squad at end of season

Note: Flags indicate national team as defined under FIFA eligibility rules; some limited exceptions apply. Players may hold more than one non-FIFA nationality.

No.	Pos.	Nation	Player
1	GK	CZE	Jan Hanuš
4	DF	SRB	Nemanja Tekijaški
5	DF	CZE	David Štěpánek
6	MF	NGA	Nelson Okeke
7	MF	GEO	Vakhtang Chanturishvili
8	MF	CZE	Filip Zorvan
9	FW	SVK	Dominik Hollý (on loan from Sparta Prague)
12	DF	CZE	David Nykrín
13	MF	CZE	Richard Sedláček
14	DF	CZE	Daniel Souček
17	MF	SVK	Samuel Lavrinčík
18	DF	CZE	Martin Cedidla
19	FW	CZE	Jan Chramosta
21	MF	CZE	Matěj Polidar

No.	Pos.	Nation	Player
23	DF	UKR	Eduard Sobol
24	FW	CZE	David Puškáč
25	MF	SVK	Sebastian Nebyla
26	DF	CZE	Kryštof Karban
27	FW	GAM	Ebrima Singhateh
33	GK	CZE	Albert Kotlín
42	FW	SVN	Matej Malenšek
44	FW	GAM	Lamin Jawo
57	DF	CZE	Filip Novák
77	FW	CMR	Alexis Alégué
84	DF	CRO	Renato Pantalon
90	DF	BFA	Nassim Innocenti
99	GK	SVN	Klemen Mihelak

== Transfers ==
=== Summer ===
In:

No.	Pos.	Nation	Player
9	MF	CZE	Lukáš Penxa (on loan from Sparta Prague B)
17	MF	SVK	Samuel Lavrinčík (from (Slovakia) Ružomberok)
21	MF	CZE	Matěj Polidar (from Sparta Prague, previously on loan)
44	FW	GAM	Lamin Jawo (from Mladá Boleslav, previously on loan)
90	DF	BFA	Nassim Innocenti (from (Slovakia) Košice)

Out:

No.	Pos.	Nation	Player
20	FW	BDI	Bienvenue Kanakimana (to Zbrojovka Brno)
26	MF	SVK	Dominik Hollý (to Sparta Prague)
37	FW	CZE	Matouš Krulich (to Mladá Boleslav)
95	MF	CZE	Michal Černák (to Dukla Prague)
—	GK	CZE	Vilém Fendrich (to Česká Lípa, previously on loan at České Budějovice)

=== Winter ===
In:

No.	Pos.	Nation	Player
6	MF	NGA	Nelson Okeke (from Sparta Prague B, previously on loan at Bohemians)
9	MF	SVK	Dominik Hollý (on loan from Sparta Prague)
23	DF	UKR	Eduard Sobol (from (France) Strasbourg)
27	FW	GAM	Ebrima Singhateh (from Karviná)

Out:

No.	Pos.	Nation	Player
9	MF	CZE	Lukáš Penxa (loan return to Sparta Prague B)
10	MF	CZE	Jan Suchan (on loan to Slovácko)
16	FW	CZE	Antonín Růsek (loan return to Sigma Olomouc)

== Competitions ==
=== Overview ===
Competition	First match	Last match	Starting round	Final position	Record							
Competition	First match	Last match	Starting round	Final position	Pld	W	D	L	GF	GA	GD	Win %
Czech First League	19 July 2025	24 May 2026	Matchday 1	5th	35	16	7	12	45	47	−2	45.71
Czech Cup	26 August 2025	20 May 2026	Second round	Runners-up	6	4	1	1	11	6	+5	66.67
Total					41	20	8	13	56	53	+3	48.78

Source: Competitions

=== Czech First League ===
==== Regular season ====
===== League table =====
Pos	Team	Pld	W	D	L	GF	GA	GD	Pts	Qualification or relegation
2	Sparta Prague	30	19	6	5	60	33	+27	63	Qualification for the championship group
3	Viktoria Plzeň	30	15	8	7	50	34	+16	53	Qualification for the championship group
4	Jablonec	30	15	6	9	41	33	+8	51	Qualification for the championship group
5	Hradec Králové	30	14	7	9	43	34	+9	49	Qualification for the championship group
6	Slovan Liberec	30	12	10	8	43	30	+13	46	Qualification for the championship group

Source: Chance Liga
Rules for classification: 1) Points; 2) Head-to-head points; 3) Head-to-head goal difference; 4) Head-to-head goals scored; 5) Goal difference; 6) Goals scored; 7) Fair-play ranking; 8) Draw.

===== Results summary =====
Overall								Home						Away					
Pld	W	D	L	GF	GA	GD	Pts	W	D	L	GF	GA	GD	W	D	L	GF	GA	GD
30	15	6	9	41	33	+8	51	7	5	3	22	15	+7	8	1	6	19	18	+1

===== Results by round =====
Round	1	2	3	4	5	6	7	8	9	10	11	12	13	14	15	16	17	18	19	20	21	22	23	24	25	26	27	28	29	30
Ground	H	A	H	A	H	A	A	H	A	H	A	H	A	H	A	H	A	H	A	H	H	A	H	A	H	A	H	A	H	A
Result	D	D	W	W	D	W	W	W	W	W	L	D	W	L	W	D	L	W	L	W	D	W	W	L	L	L	L	W	W	L
Position	10	9	7	6	5	4	3	3	3	3	3	3	2	3	3	3	3	3	3	3	3	3	3	3	4	4	4	4	4	4
Points	1	2	5	8	9	12	15	18	21	24	24	25	28	28	31	32	32	35	35	38	39	42	45	45	45	45	45	48	51	51

A = Away; H = Home; W = Win; D = Draw; L = Loss

===== Matches =====
19 July 2025 1	Jablonec	1–1	Sparta Prague	Jablonec nad Nisou
20:00 CEST (UTC+2)	Jawo 23'; Cedidla (yellow card) 33'; Alégué (yellow card) 72'; Nebyla (yellow card) 72'; Beran (yellow card) 82'	Report	Uchenna (yellow card) 2'; Kuchta 59'; Kairinen (yellow card) 74'	Stadium: Stadion Střelnice; Attendance: 5,500; Referee: Jan Všetečka; Assistant referees: Jan Paták, Kamil Hájek; Fourth official: Pavel Orel

26 July 2025 2	Viktoria Plzeň	1–1	Jablonec	Plzeň
17:00 CEST (UTC+2)	Spáčil (yellow card) 36'; Vydra 45+8'	Report	Kozel (yellow card) 24' (not on pitch); Alégué (yellow card) 27'; Martinec (yellow card) 90+2'; Tekijaški 90+5'	Stadium: Doosan Arena; Attendance: 10,152; Referee: Lukáš Nehasil; Assistant referees: Lucie Ratajová, Lukáš Slavíček; Fourth official: Dominik Starý

2 August 2025 3	Jablonec	2–0	Hradec Králové	Jablonec nad Nisou
17:00 CEST (UTC+2)	Chramosta 2', 62', (yellow card) 58'; Martinec (yellow card) 72'	Report	Horák (red card) 25'	Stadium: Stadion Střelnice; Attendance: 2,984; Referee: Marek Radina; Assistant referees: Jiří Kříž, Petr Kotalík; Fourth official: Matěj Kubečka

10 August 2025 4	Bohemians 1905	0–1	Jablonec	Prague
15:00 CEST (UTC+2)	Sinyavskiy (yellow card) 39' (yellow-red card) 68'; Okeke (yellow card) 45+2'; Helal (yellow card) 87'; Ristovski (yellow card) 87'	Report	Chramosta 28'; Tekijaški (yellow card) 50'	Stadium: Ďolíček; Attendance: 5,408; Referee: Pavel Orel; Assistant referees: Radek Kotík, Marek Bělák; Fourth official: Ladislav Szikszay

16 August 2025 5	Jablonec	1–1	Slavia Prague	Jablonec nad Nisou
20:00 CEST (UTC+2)	Chramosta 29'; Martinec (yellow card) 43'; Alégué (yellow card) 63'; Jawo (yellow card) 64'; Nebyla (yellow card) 69'; Čech (yellow card) 70' (not on pitch); Hanuš (yellow card) 74'; Kozel (yellow card) 80' (not on pitch); Chanturishvili (yellow card) 85'; Fortelný (yellow card) 90+3'	Report	Ogbu (yellow card) 5'; Kerbr (yellow card) 16' (not on pitch); Holeš (yellow card) 24'; Bořil (yellow card) 38'; Douděra (yellow card) 54', (goal) 90'	Stadium: Stadion Střelnice; Attendance: 5,500; Referee: Karel Rouček; Assistant referees: Jiří Kříž, Adam Beneš; Fourth official: Daniel Vokoun

23 August 2025 6	Teplice	0–1	Jablonec	Teplice
17:00 CEST (UTC+2)	Sedláček (yellow card) 45'; Pulkrab (yellow card) 67'; Halinský (yellow card) 70'; Danihel (yellow card) 82'	Report	Jawo 11'	Stadium: Na Stínadlech; Attendance: 3,605; Referee: Marek Radina; Assistant referees: Jan Váňa, Petr Kotalík; Fourth official: Matěj Kubečka

30 August 2025 7	Slovácko	0–2	Jablonec	Uherské Hradiště
17:00 CEST (UTC+2)	Stojchevski (yellow card) 30'; Ndefe (yellow card) 45+3'; Reinberk (yellow card) 74'; Melichárek (red card) 79' (not on pitch)	Report	Nebyla (yellow card) 29'; Novák 42'; Chanturishvili (yellow card) 76'; Martinec 86'	Stadium: Městský fotbalový stadion Miroslava Valenty; Attendance: 3,380; Referee: Stanislav Volek; Assistant referees: Jan Paták, David Žurovec; Fourth official: Simon Vejtasa

14 September 2025 8	Jablonec	3–2	Pardubice	Jablonec nad Nisou
13:00 CEST (UTC+2)	Chramosta 18'; Jawo 33', 36', (yellow card) 60'; Růsek (yellow card) 88'	Report	Konečný (yellow card) 55'; Vecheta (yellow card) 58'; Mahuta 60'; Patrák 70' (pen.)	Stadium: Stadion Střelnice; Attendance: 2,350; Referee: Jan Machálek; Assistant referees: Radek Kotík, Petr Antoníček; Fourth official: Filip Kotala

20 September 2025 9	Karviná	1–2	Jablonec	Karviná
15:00 CEST (UTC+2)	Krčík 85' (pen.)	Report	Cedidla 5'; Růsek 77'; Puškáč (yellow card) 90+5'	Stadium: Městský stadion Attendance: 2,063; Referee: Dominik Starý; Assistant referees: Michal Volf, Lukáš Slavíček; Fourth official: Simon Vejtasa

28 September 2025 10	Jablonec	2–0	Mladá Boleslav	Jablonec nad Nisou
15:30 CEST (UTC+2)	Nebyla (yellow card) 30'; Chramosta 37' (pen.), 60' (pen.); Zorvan (yellow card) 51'; Alégué (yellow card) 77'	Report	Langhamer (yellow card) 21'; Zíka (yellow card) 36'; Pech (yellow card) 50'; Prebsl (yellow card) 79'	Stadium: Stadion Střelnice; Attendance: 2,461; Referee: Jan Beneš; Assistant referees: Jan Váňa, Adam Beneš

5 October 2025 11	Sigma Olomouc	2–0	Jablonec	Olomouc
15:30 CEST (UTC+2)	Dolžnikov 24'; Mikulenka 45'	Report	Tekijaški (yellow card) 66'	Stadium: Andrův stadion Attendance: 3,407; Referee: Stanislav Volek; Assistant referees: Ivo Nádvorník, Daniel Marek; Fourth official: Jan Machálek

19 October 2025 12	Jablonec	0–0	Dukla Prague	Jablonec nad Nisou
18:30 CEST (UTC+2)	Chanturishvili (yellow card) 76'	Report	Ambler (yellow card) 45+1'; Isife (yellow card) 46'; Černák (yellow card) 68'; Diallo (yellow card) 78'; Kadák (yellow card) 86'	Stadium: Stadion Střelnice; Attendance: 2,234; Referee: Ladislav Szikszay; Assistant referees: Michal Volf, Jakub Hrabovský; Fourth official: Vojtěch Opočenský

25 October 2025 13	Slovan Liberec	0–2	Jablonec	Liberec
18:00 CEST (UTC+2)	Hlavatý (yellow card) 22'; Hodouš (yellow card) 29'; Mikula (yellow card) 39'; Mašek (yellow card) 61'	Report	Souček (yellow card) 29'; Polidar (yellow card) 29'; Tekijaški (yellow card) 44'; Chanturishvili 65'; Jawo 68'	Stadium: Stadion u Nisy; Attendance: 4,587; Referee: Jan Beneš; Assistant referees: David Zoufalý, Adam Beneš; Fourth official: Antonín Bohata

1 November 2025 14	Jablonec	1–3	Zlín	Jablonec nad Nisou
15:00 CET (UTC+1)	Chanturishvili (yellow card) 59'; Puškáč 76'	Report	Kanu 6', 43'; Bartošák 40', (yellow card) 45'; Cupák (yellow card) 62'; Nombil (yellow card) 65'	Stadium: Stadion Střelnice; Attendance: 1,871; Referee: Pavel Orel; Assistant referees: Lucie Ratajová, Petr Kotalík; Fourth official: Adam Trška

8 November 2025 15	Baník Ostrava	0–1	Jablonec	Ostrava
18:00 CET (UTC+1)	Pojezný (yellow card) 86'	Report	Jawo 25', (yellow card) 42'; Tekijaški (yellow card) 61'	Stadium: Městský stadion Attendance: 7,069; Referee: Karel Rouček; Assistant referees: Lukáš Machač, Jan Hurych; Fourth official: Adam Trška

23 November 2025 16	Jablonec	3–3	Viktoria Plzeň	Jablonec nad Nisou
15:30 CET (UTC+1)	Růsek 20', 60'; Alégué 23'; Souček (yellow card) 63'; Zorvan (yellow card) 90'; Chanturishvili (yellow card) 90+1'	Report	Doski 6'; Valenta 10'; Spáčil (yellow card) 17'; Souaré 62'	Stadium: Stadion Střelnice; Attendance: 3,156; Referee: Jan Všetečka; Assistant referees: Ivo Nádvorník, Kamil Hájek; Fourth official: Ondřej Pechanec

29 November 2025 17	Hradec Králové	2–0	Jablonec	Hradec Králové
15:00 CET (UTC+1)	Slončík 53', 84'; Petrášek (yellow card) 88'	Report	Chramosta (yellow card) 87'	Stadium: Malšovická aréna Attendance: 4,401; Referee: Marek Radina; Assistant referees: Jaroslav Kubr, Jiří Pečenka; Fourth official: Michal Panský

7 December 2025 18	Jablonec	1–0	Bohemians 1905	Jablonec nad Nisou
13:00 CET (UTC+1)	Chramosta 45+2'; Růsek (yellow card) 90'	Report	Sakala (yellow card) 21'; Kovařík (yellow card) 43'; Sinyavskiy (yellow card) 80'	Stadium: Stadion Střelnice; Attendance: 2,358; Referee: Ondřej Berka; Assistant referees: Matěj Vlček, Lucie Ratajová; Fourth official: Ondřej Pechanec

13 December 2025 19	Slavia Prague	4–3	Jablonec	Prague
18:00 CET (UTC+1)	Provod 10'; Chorý 38' (pen.), 71'; Chaloupek 55'; Zafeiris (yellow card) 61'	Report	Tekijaški 34'; Zorvan 45+2'; Innocenti (yellow card) 46'; Čech (yellow card) 55' (not on pitch); Jawo 57', (yellow card) 77'; Cedidla (yellow card) 90+1'	Stadium: Fortuna Arena; Attendance: 17,909; Referee: Jan Beneš; Assistant referees: David Zoufalý, Adam Beneš; Fourth official: Lukáš Nehasil

31 January 2026 20	Jablonec	1–0	Teplice	Jablonec nad Nisou
15:00 CET (UTC+1)	Jawo 20'; Okeke (red card) 70'; Hollý (yellow card) 90+3'	Report	Halinský (yellow card) 59'; Jukl (yellow card) 84'	Stadium: Stadion Střelnice; Attendance: 2,023; Referee: Jakub Wulkan; Assistant referees: Matěj Vlček, Lukáš Slavíček; Fourth official: Adam Trška

7 February 2026 21	Jablonec	0–0	Slovácko	Jablonec nad Nisou
15:00 CET (UTC+1)		Report	Heča (yellow card) 83'; Petržela (yellow card) 90+1'	Stadium: Stadion Střelnice; Attendance: 2,043; Referee: Lukáš Nehasil; Assistant referees: Petr Kotalík, Václav Ježek; Fourth official: Dominik Starý

15 February 2026 22	Pardubice	0–2	Jablonec	Pardubice
13:00 CET (UTC+1)		Report	Sedláček (yellow card) 74'; Hollý 76'; Nebyla 82'	Stadium: Stadion Arnošta Košťála; Attendance: 1,957; Referee: Ondřej Berka; Assistant referees: Jan Paták, Jan Dorotík; Fourth official: Jakub Wulkan

21 February 2026 23	Jablonec	1–0	Karviná	Jablonec nad Nisou
15:00 CET (UTC+1)	Souček (yellow card) 41'; Nebyla (yellow card) 43', (goal) 57'; Hollý (yellow card) 90'	Report	Prebsl (yellow card) 19'; Lapeš (yellow card) 36'; Jarolím (yellow card) 40' (not on pitch); Kačor (yellow card) 77'; Maniatis (yellow card) 90+7' (not on pitch)	Stadium: Stadion Střelnice; Attendance: 1,843; Referee: Jan Beneš; Assistant referees: David Zoufalý, Adam Beneš; Fourth official: Adam Trška

28 February 2026 24	Mladá Boleslav	3–0	Jablonec	Mladá Boleslav
15:00 CET (UTC+1)	Ševčík 48'; Kostka 52'; Sobol 55' (o.g.)	Report	Alégué (red card) (post-match)	Stadium: Lokotrans Aréna; Attendance: 1,691; Referee: Pavel Orel; Assistant referees: Jiří Pečenka, Matěj Cichra; Fourth official: Daniel Vokoun

7 March 2026 25	Jablonec	1–2	Sigma Olomouc	Jablonec nad Nisou
18:00 CET (UTC+1)	Cedidla (yellow card) 24'; Chramosta 47' (pen.); Novák (yellow card) 73'	Report	Ghali (yellow card) 32'; Lurvink 37'; Šturm (yellow card) 41'; Baráth (yellow card) 60'; Beran (yellow card) 65'; Koutný (yellow card) 74'; Slavíček (yellow card) 83'; Šíp 88'	Stadium: Stadion Střelnice; Attendance: 2,198; Referee: Dominik Starý; Assistant referees: David Zoufalý, Lukáš Slavíček; Fourth official: Ondřej Pechanec

14 March 2026 26	Dukla Prague	2–0	Jablonec	Prague
15:00 CET (UTC+1)	Gilbert 13'; Penxa 17'; Bačkovský (yellow card) 83'; Unušić (yellow card) 90+2'	Report	Nebyla (yellow card) 24'	Stadium: Stadion Juliska; Attendance: 2,884; Referee: Ondřej Berka; Assistant referees: Jan Váňa, Václav Ježek; Fourth official: Adam Trška

4 April 2026 28	Zlín	0–3	Jablonec	Zlín
15:00 CEST (UTC+2)	Nombil (yellow card) 44'; Petruta (yellow card) 51'; Kopečný (yellow card) 54'; Penkevics (yellow card) 82'	Report	Jawo 26'; Hollý 36'; Tekijaški 59'; Pantalon (yellow card) 84'	Stadium: Letná Stadion; Attendance: 2,510; Referee: Marek Radina; Assistant referees: Jaroslav Kubr, Lukáš Slavíček; Fourth official: Jan Machálek

11 April 2026 29	Jablonec	4–1	Baník Ostrava	Jablonec nad Nisou
15:00 CEST (UTC+2)	Hollý 8'; Okeke 41', (yellow card) 56'; Singhateh 85'; Nebyla 90+2'	Report	Kričfaluši 24'; Chaluš (yellow card) 45'; Jurečka (yellow card) 54'; Planka (yellow card) 58'; Havlík (yellow card) 83' (not on pitch)	Stadium: Stadion Střelnice; Attendance: 3,059; Referee: Jan Beneš; Assistant referees: Kamil Hájek, Adam Beneš; Fourth official: Antonín Bohata

18 April 2026 30	Sparta Prague	3–1	Jablonec	Prague
18:00 CEST (UTC+2)	Kuchta 21', 62'; Haraslín 37'	Report	Nebyla 24'	Stadium: epet ARENA; Attendance: 17,514; Referee: Marek Radina; Assistant referees: Jaroslav Kubr, Jiří Pečenka; Fourth official: Jakub Wulkan

25 April 2026 27	Jablonec	1–2	Slovan Liberec	Jablonec nad Nisou
16:00 CEST (UTC+2)	Sobol (yellow card) 45'; Chanturishvili (yellow card) 45+1'; Chramosta 67' (pen.); Jawo (yellow card) 88'	Report	Diakité 31'; Lexa (yellow card) 55'; Krollis 58'; Hodouš (yellow card) 77'; Hampel (yellow card) 87' (not on pitch); Mikula (yellow card) 88'; Soliu (yellow card) 90+6'	Stadium: Stadion Střelnice; Attendance: 5,250; Referee: Lukáš Nehasil; Assistant referees: Petr Kotalík, Lukáš Slavíček; Fourth official: Antonín Bohata

==== Championship group ====
===== League table =====
Pos	Team	Pld	W	D	L	GF	GA	GD	Pts	Qualification or relegation
1	Slavia Prague (C)	35	24	8	3	74	31	+43	80	Qualification for the Champions League league phase
2	Sparta Prague	35	23	7	5	69	34	+35	76	Qualification for the Champions League third qualifying round
3	Viktoria Plzeň	35	18	9	8	60	38	+22	63	Qualification for the Europa League play-off round
4	Hradec Králové	35	16	8	11	50	41	+9	56	Qualification for the Europa League second qualifying round
5	Jablonec	35	16	7	12	45	47	−2	55	Qualification for the Conference League second qualifying round
6	Slovan Liberec	35	12	10	13	45	39	+6	46	

Source: Chance Liga
Rules for classification: 1) Total points; 2) Points earned in regular season; 3) Head-to-head points (regular season); 4) Head-to-head goal difference (regular season); 5) Head-to-head goals scored (regular season); 5) Goal difference (all matches); 6) Goals scored (all matches); 7) Fair-play ranking; 8) Draw.
(C) Champions

===== Results summary =====
Overall								Home						Away					
Pld	W	D	L	GF	GA	GD	Pts	W	D	L	GF	GA	GD	W	D	L	GF	GA	GD
35	16	7	12	45	47	−2	55	8	6	3	25	17	+8	8	1	9	20	30	−10

===== Results by round =====
Round	1	2	3	4	5
Ground	A	H	A	A	H
Result	L	D	L	L	W
Position	4	4	5	5	5
Points	51	52	52	52	55

A = Away; H = Home; W = Win; D = Draw; L = Loss

===== Matches =====
3 May 2026 31	Sparta Prague	2–0	Jablonec	Prague
18:30 CEST (UTC+2)	Kuchta 45+2'; Mannsverk (yellow card) 55'; Rrahmani 77'; Azaka (red card) 80'	Report	Sobol (yellow card) 10' (yellow-red card) 43'; Čech (yellow card) 44' (not on pitch)	Stadium: epet ARENA; Attendance: 15,893; Referee: Stanislav Volek; Assistant referees: Jan Paták, Jiří Pečenka; Fourth official: Jan Machálek

10 May 2026 32	Jablonec	1–1	Hradec Králové	Jablonec nad Nisou
18:30 CEST (UTC+2)	Puškáč 85'	Report	Mihálik 25'; Trubač (yellow card) 70'; Kučera (yellow card) 73'	Stadium: Stadion Střelnice; Attendance: 2,649; Referee: Dalibor Černý; Assistant referees: Lukáš Machač, Radek Kotík; Fourth official: Aleš Mach

13 May 2026 33	Slavia Prague	5–1	Jablonec	Prague
20:00 CEST (UTC+2)	Chaloupek 14', 56'; Isife 37'; Chytil 44'; Holeš 49', (yellow card) 79'; Mbodji (yellow card) 88'	Report	Sobol (yellow card) 1', (goal) 62'	Stadium: Fortuna Arena; Attendance: 121; Referee: Marek Radina; Assistant referees: Jaroslav Kubr, Jiří Pečenka; Fourth official: Jakub Wulkan

17 May 2026 34	Viktoria Plzeň	5–0	Jablonec	Plzeň
17:00 CEST (UTC+2)	Krčík 14' (pen.), 34'; Višinský 21'; Sojka 39'; Vydra 48'	Report	Polidar (yellow card) 9'; Obinaya (yellow card) 38'	Stadium: Doosan Arena; Attendance: 8,499; Referee: Jakub Wulkan; Assistant referees: Jan Váňa, Michal Volf; Fourth official: Antonín Bohata

24 May 2026 35	Jablonec	2–1	Slovan Liberec	Jablonec nad Nisou
14:00 CEST (UTC+2)	Zorvan 38'; Nebyla (yellow card) 44'; Souček (yellow card) 70'; Tekijaški 76'; Mihelak (yellow card) 90+4'	Report	Rýzek (red card) 15'; Chanturishvili 72' (o.g.)	Stadium: Stadion Střelnice; Attendance: 3,106; Referee: Vojtěch Opočenský; Assistant referees: Petr Kotalík, Václav Ježek; Fourth official: Adam Trška

=== Czech Cup ===
26 August 2025 Second round	Admira Prague	0–3	Jablonec	Prague
17:30 CEST (UTC+2)	Čížek (yellow card) 13'	Report	Chramosta 28'; Puškáč 43'; Beran 84'	Stadium: Stadion Na Pecích; Attendance: 1,180; Referee: Adam Trška; Assistant referees: Jaroslav Kubr, Jaroslav Hádek

24 September 2025 Third round	Hlinsko	0–2	Jablonec	Hlinsko
16:00 CEST (UTC+2)		Report	Penxa 11'; Alégué (yellow card) 28'; Pantalon (yellow card) 40'; Zorvan 54'; Cedidla (yellow card) 82'	Attendance: 800; Referee: Michal Panský; Assistant referees: Kamil Hájek, Petr Kotalík

28 October 2025 Fourth round	Jablonec	2–1	Dukla Prague	Jablonec nad Nisou
17:00 CET (UTC+1)	Růsek 1', (yellow card) 61'; Puškáč 78'	Report	Šebrle (yellow card) 6'; Ambler (yellow card) 30'; Isife (yellow card) 65'; Traore (yellow card) 69'; Černák 89'	Stadium: Stadion Střelnice; Attendance: 1,583; Referee: Ondřej Berka; Assistant referees: Lucie Ratajová, Lukáš Matoušek

3 March 2026 Quarter-finals	Jablonec	2–2 (a.e.t.) (3–2 p)	Slavia Prague	Jablonec nad Nisou
17:00 CET (UTC+1)	Chramosta 53'; Zorvan (yellow card) 78'; Singhateh 80'; Mihelak (yellow card) 83'; Jawo (yellow card) 89'	Report	Suleiman 6'; Kušej (yellow card) 83'; Mbodji (yellow card) 89', (goal) 90+4'	Stadium: Stadion Střelnice; Attendance: 6,108; Referee: Jan Všetečka; Assistant referees: Jiří Kříž, Lukáš Machač
	Penalties
	Novák (penalty missed); Štěpánek (penalty scored); Jawo (penalty scored); Singhateh (penalty scored)		(penalty scored) Chorý; (penalty missed) Chaloupek; (penalty scored) Jurásek; (penalty missed) Holeš; (penalty missed) Kušej
Note: Jablonec won 3–2 on penalties.

21 April 2026 Semi-finals	Jablonec	1–0	Mladá Boleslav	Jablonec nad Nisou
17:00 CEST (UTC+2)	Jawo 34'; Zorvan (yellow card) 48'	Report	Karafiát (yellow card) 60'; Králik (yellow card) 70'	Stadium: Stadion Střelnice; Attendance: 3,827; Referee: Ondřej Berka; Assistant referees: Matěj Vlček, Jan Váňa

20 May 2026 Final	Jablonec	1–3	Karviná	Hradec Králové
18:00 CEST (UTC+2)	Jawo 17' (pen.), (yellow card) 27'; Zorvan (yellow card) 20'; Chanturishvili (yellow card) 57'; Singhateh (red card) 57'; Polidar (yellow card) 87'	Report	Kačor (yellow card) 15'; Camara (yellow card) 41'; Condé 44', (yellow card) 90+1'; Vinícius 48', 90+1', (yellow card) 61'; Prebsl (yellow card) 64'; Samko (yellow card) 66'; Mrózek (yellow card) 68'	Stadium: Malšovická aréna Attendance: 7,352; Referee: Marek Radina; Assistant referees: Jaroslav Kubr, Jiří Pečenka
