= 2023–24 FC Hradec Králové season =

FC Hradec Králové
2023–24 season
- Manager: Jozef Weber (until 18 September); Václav Kotal (from 18 September)
- Stadium: Malšovická aréna
- Czech First League: 9th
- Czech Cup: Fourth round
- Average home league attendance: 7,361
Home colours	Away colours

The 2023–24 season was FC Hradec Králové's 119th season in existence and third consecutive in the Czech First League. They also competed in the Czech Cup.

== Players ==
=== First-team squad ===
As of 8 September 2023.

Note: Flags indicate national team as defined under FIFA eligibility rules; some limited exceptions apply. Players may hold more than one non-FIFA nationality.

No.	Pos.	Nation	Player
1	GK	CZE	Patrik Vízek
6	MF	CZE	Václav Pilař
7	MF	CZE	Ladislav Krejčí
8	DF	CZE	David Heidenreich
9	MF	SVK	Lukáš Čmelík
10	MF	CZE	Petr Pudhorocký
11	MF	SVK	Samuel Dancák (on loan from Mladá Boleslav)
12	GK	CZE	Adam Zadražil
14	DF	CZE	Jakub Klíma
15	FW	CZE	Daniel Vašulín
16	DF	CZE	Vojtěch Baloun
17	FW	CZE	Petr Juliš
18	DF	CZE	Michal Leibl

No.	Pos.	Nation	Player
19	DF	CZE	Ondřej Ševčík
20	GK	SVK	Pavol Bajza
21	DF	CZE	Štěpán Harazim
22	MF	CZE	Petr Kodeš
23	MF	CZE	Jakub Rada
24	DF	CZE	Martin Hlaváč
25	DF	CZE	František Čech
26	DF	CZE	Daniel Horák
27	FW	CZE	Ondřej Šašinka
28	MF	CZE	Jakub Kučera
29	FW	CZE	Matěj Koubek
—	FW	CZE	Daniel Hais

=== Out on loan ===
Note: Flags indicate national team as defined under FIFA eligibility rules; some limited exceptions apply. Players may hold more than one non-FIFA nationality.

No.	Pos.	Nation	Player
—	DF	CZE	Daniel Kutík (at Chrudim)
—	FW	CZE	David Jurčenko (at Chrudim)
—	FW	CZE	Lukáš Hájek (at Chrudim)

No.	Pos.	Nation	Player
—	MF	CZE	Denny Samko (at Varnsdorf)
—	FW	CZE	Filip Firbacher (at Varnsdorf)

== Transfers ==
=== In ===
Pos.	Player	Transferred from	Fee	Date	Source

=== Out ===
Pos.	Player	Transferred to	Fee	Date	Source

== Pre-season and friendlies ==
Win Draw Loss

21 June 2023 Friendly	SK Libčany (Czech Republic)	0–4	(Czech Republic) Hradec Králové
18:00			Vašulín 21'; Harazim 54'; Ševčík 63'; Horák 71'

24 June 2023 Friendly	Hradec Králové (Czech Republic)	1–1	(Czech Republic) Sellier & Bellot Vlašim
17:00

28 June 2023 Friendly	Hradec Králové (Czech Republic)	3–1	(Czech Republic) Vyškov
17:00

8 July 2023 Friendly	Hradec Králové (Czech Republic)	3–0	(Czech Republic) Táborsko
10:30

12 July 2023 Friendly	Viktoria Žižkov (Czech Republic)	2–2	(Czech Republic) Hradec Králové	Trutnov
10:30				Stadium: UMT FK Trutnov

15 July 2023 Friendly	Hradec Králové (Czech Republic)	5–1	(Czech Republic) Sparta Prague B	Opatovice nad Labem
17:00				Stadium: Hřište Opatovice nad Labem

== Competitions ==
=== Overall record ===
Competition	First match	Last match	Starting round	Final position	Record							
Competition	First match	Last match	Starting round	Final position	Pld	W	D	L	GF	GA	GD	Win %
Czech First League	23 July 2023	27 April 2024	Matchday 1	9th	30	9	10	11	32	38	−6	30.00
Czech Cup	6 September 2023	6 December 2023	Second round	Fourth round	3	2	0	1	5	4	+1	66.67
Total					33	11	10	12	37	42	−5	33.33

Source: Soccerway

=== Czech First League ===
==== Results summary ====
Overall								Home						Away					
Pld	W	D	L	GF	GA	GD	Pts	W	D	L	GF	GA	GD	W	D	L	GF	GA	GD
30	9	10	11	32	38	−6	37	7	4	4	23	17	+6	2	6	7	9	21	−12

Source: Fortuna Liga

==== Regular season ====
===== League table =====
Pos	Team	Pld	W	D	L	GF	GA	GD	Pts	Qualification or relegation
7	Slovan Liberec	30	10	10	10	46	46	0	40	Qualification for the Play-off
8	Sigma Olomouc	30	10	7	13	40	45	−5	37	Qualification for the Play-off
9	Hradec Králové	30	9	10	11	32	38	−6	37	Qualification for the Play-off
10	Teplice	30	9	9	12	31	40	−9	36	Qualification for the Play-off
11	Bohemians 1905	30	8	11	11	29	40	−11	35	Qualification for the Relegation group

Source: Fortuna Liga
Rules for classification: 1) Points; 2) Head-to-head points; 3) Head-to-head goal difference; 4) Head-to-head goals scored; 5) Goal difference; 6) Goals scored; 7) Fair-play ranking; 8) Draw.

===== Results by round =====
Round	1	2	3	4	5	6	7	8	9	10	11	12	13	14	15	16	17	18	19	20	21	22	23	24	25	26	27	28	29	30
Ground	A	A	H	A	H	A	H	A	H	A	H	A	H	A	H	H	H	A	A	H	A	H	A	H	A	H	A	H	A	H
Result	L	D	W	L	W	L	L	L	W	D	L	L	W	D	D	D	L	W	L	D	D	D	D	W	L	W	W	W	D	L
Position	14	14	7	10	9	10	11	11	11	10	10	11	10	11	11	11	11	11	12	12	13	12	12	11	12	11	9	9	9	9

Source: Fortuna Liga
A = Away; H = Home; W = Win; D = Draw; L = Loss

===== Matches =====
The league fixtures were unveiled on 21 June 2023.

22 July 2023 1	Slavia Prague	2–0	Hradec Králové	Prague
18:00 CEST (UTC+2)	Van Buren 4'; Chytil 70'	Report		Stadium: Fortuna Arena; Attendance: 17,311; Referee: Jan Všetečka

30 July 2023 2	Viktoria Plzeň	1–1	Hradec Králové	Plzeň
18:00 CEST (UTC+2)	Hejda 81'	Report	Šašinka 90+6'	Stadium: Doosan Arena; Attendance: 8,071; Referee: Jan Machálek

5 August 2023 3	Hradec Králové	5–1	České Budějovice	Hradec Králové
18:00 CEST (UTC+2)	Vašulín 19'; Horák 21'; Krejčí 31'; Kučera 49'; Pilař 54' (pen.)	Report	Hora 48'	Stadium: Malšovická aréna Attendance: 9,058; Referee: Dalibor Černý

12 August 2023 4	Baník Ostrava	2–0	Hradec Králové	Ostrava
15:00 CEST (UTC+2)	Buchta 90+2'; Tanko 90+6'	Report		Stadium: Městský stadion Attendance: 7,040; Referee: Vít Zaoral

20 August 2023 5	Hradec Králové	2–0	Zlín	Hradec Králové
15:00 CEST (UTC+2)	Gabriel 45+1'; Horák 74'	Report		Stadium: Malšovická aréna Attendance: 8,567; Referee: Dominik Starý

27 August 2023 6	Bohemians 1905	2–1	Hradec Králové	Prague
15:00 CEST (UTC+2)	Kovařík 8', 74'	Report	Kučera 67'	Stadium: Ďolíček; Attendance: 4,579; Referee: Tomáš Batík

3 September 2023 7	Hradec Králové	1–3	Sigma Olomouc	Hradec Králové
20:00 CEST (UTC+2)	Krejčí 13'	Report	Zmrzlý 41'; Vodháněl 76'; Juliš 90+5'	Stadium: Malšovická aréna Attendance: 9,150; Referee: Jan Petřík

16 September 2023 8	Mladá Boleslav	5–1	Hradec Králové	Mladá Boleslav
15:00 CEST (UTC+2)	Mareček 5', 21'; Karafiát 14'; Kušej 48'; Suchý 80'	Report	Juliš 57'	Stadium: Lokotrans Aréna; Attendance: 3,011; Referee: Dalibor Černý

24 September 2023 9	Hradec Králové	1–0	Jablonec	Hradec Králové
15:00 CEST (UTC+2)	Horák 17'; Leibl (yellow card) 44'; Harazim (yellow card) 82'; Dancák (yellow card) 84'	Report	Souček (yellow card) 56'; Polidar (yellow card) 58'; Kratochvíl (yellow card) 68'; Hurtado (red card) 72'; Jovović (yellow card) 74'	Stadium: Malšovická aréna Attendance: 7,762; Referee: Jan Machálek

1 October 2023 10	Pardubice	1–1	Hradec Králové	Pardubice
18:00 CEST (UTC+2)	Černý 44' (pen.)	Report	Harazim 61'	Stadium: CFIG Arena; Attendance: 4,530; Referee: Ondřej Berka

8 October 2023 11	Hradec Králové	1–3	Sparta Prague	Hradec Králové
15:00 CEST (UTC+2)	Pilař 64'	Report	Olatunji (red card) 11'; Karabec 15', 34'; Friis (assistant coach) (yellow card) 20'; Wiesner (yellow card) 69'; Kuchta 71'	Stadium: Malšovická aréna Attendance: 9,300; Referee: Petr Hocek

21 October 2023 12	Karviná	1–0	Hradec Králové	Karviná
15:00 CEST (UTC+2)	Ezeh 78'	Report		Stadium: Městský stadion Attendance: 2,270; Referee: Stanislav Volek

28 October 2023 13	Hradec Králové	1–0	Teplice	Hradec Králové
15:00 CEST (UTC+2)	Čmelík 41'	Report		Stadium: Malšovická aréna Attendance: 6,412; Referee: Jan Všetečka

4 November 2023 14	Slovácko	0–0	Hradec Králové	Uherské Hradiště
15:00 CET (UTC+1)		Report		Stadium: Městský fotbalový stadion Miroslava Valenty; Attendance: 4,093; Referee: Vít Zaoral

11 November 2023 15	Hradec Králové	1–1	Slovan Liberec	Hradec Králové
15:00 CET (UTC+1)	Vašulín 27'; Kučera (yellow card) 48'; Čihák (yellow card) 63'; Pilař (yellow card) 73'; Pudhorocký (yellow card) 73'; Sabou (sporting Director) (yellow card) 84'	Report	Frýdek 30'; Fukala (yellow card) 73'; Bačkovský (yellow card) 90+5'	Stadium: Malšovická aréna Attendance: 6,318; Referee: Ladislav Szikszay

25 November 2023 16	Hradec Králové	1–1	Viktoria Plzeň	Hradec Králové
15:00 CET (UTC+1)	Leibl 11'	Report	Cadu 73'	Stadium: Malšovická aréna Attendance: 7,818; Referee: Ondřej Berka

9 December 2023 18	Hradec Králové	2–3	Baník Ostrava	Hradec Králové
18:00 CET (UTC+1)	Horák 14'; Pilař 45+2' (pen.)	Report	Ewerton 7'; Tanko 82', 89'	Stadium: Malšovická aréna Attendance: 5,075; Referee: Ladislav Szikszay

13 December 2023 17	České Budějovice	0–2	Hradec Králové	České Budějovice
17:00 CET (UTC+1)		Report	Čmelík 4'; Kučera 45+1'	Stadium: Stadion Střelecký ostrov Attendance: 783; Referee: Karel Rouček

16 December 2023 19	Zlín	4–0	Hradec Králové	Zlín
15:00 CET (UTC+1)	Žák 13', 25'; Janetzký 40'; Bartošák 42'	Report		Stadium: Letná Stadion; Attendance: 1,987; Referee: Michael Kvítek

11 February 2024 20	Hradec Králové	2–2	Bohemians 1905	Hradec Králové
15:00 CET (UTC+1)	Čihák 32'; Vašulín 74'	Report	Shejbal 80', 83'	Stadium: Malšovická aréna Attendance: 6,118; Referee: Marek Radina

17 February 2024 21	Sigma Olomouc	0–0	Hradec Králové	Olomouc
15:00 CET (UTC+1)		Report		Stadium: Andrův stadion Attendance: 2,683; Referee: Dalibor Černý

24 February 2024 22	Hradec Králové	0–0	Mladá Boleslav	Hradec Králové
15:00 CET (UTC+1)		Report		Stadium: Malšovická aréna Attendance: 5,509; Referee: Vít Zaoral

2 March 2024 23	Jablonec	1–1	Hradec Králové	Jablonec nad Nisou
15:00 CET (UTC+1)	Chramosta 35' (pen.); Černák (yellow card) 45+2'; Nebyla (yellow card) 55'; Hurtado (red card) 65'; Krob (head of department) (yellow card) 75'; Tekijaški (yellow card) 87'; Kanakimana (yellow card) 90+5'	Report	Spáčil 5'; Kučera (yellow card) 56'; Kodeš (yellow card) 65'; Horejš (coach) (yellow card) 89'	Stadium: Stadion Střelnice; Attendance: 1,832; Referee: Jan Petřík

9 March 2024 24	Hradec Králové	2–0	Pardubice	Hradec Králové
15:00 CET (UTC+1)	Čihák 57'; Vašulín 73'	Report		Stadium: Malšovická aréna Attendance: 8.519; Referee: Karel Rouček

17 March 2024 25	Sparta Prague	2–1	Hradec Králové	Prague
18:00 CET (UTC+1)	Birmančević 16'; Kuchta 47'	Report	Koubek 90+5'	Stadium: epet ARENA; Attendance: 16,666; Referee: Ondřej Berka

31 March 2024 26	Hradec Králové	2–1	Karviná	Hradec Králové
15:00 CEST (UTC+2)	Harazim 25'; Spáčil 65'	Report	Klíma 35' (o.g.)	Stadium: Malšovická aréna Attendance: 5,508; Referee: Petr Hocek

7 April 2024 27	Teplice	0–1	Hradec Králové	Teplice
15:00 CEST (UTC+2)		Report	Vašulín 6'	Stadium: Na Stínadlech; Attendance: 4,621; Referee: Ondřej Pechanec

13 April 2024 28	Hradec Králové	1–0	Slovácko	Hradec Králové
18:00 CEST (UTC+2)	Harazim 77'	Report		Stadium: Malšovická aréna Attendance: 6,012; Referee: Ladislav Szikszay

21 April 2024 29	Slovan Liberec	0–0	Hradec Králové	Liberec
15:00 CEST (UTC+2)	Pourzitidis (yellow card) 49'; Bačkovský (yellow card) 55'; Kozel (coach) (yellow card) 56'; Čech (goalkeeper coach) (yellow card) 59'; Prebsl (yellow card) 60'	Report	Vašulín (yellow card) 46'	Stadium: Stadion u Nisy; Attendance: 2,611; Referee: Ondřej Berka

28 April 2024 30	Hradec Králové	1–2	Slavia Prague	Hradec Králové
15:00 CEST (UTC+2)	Spáčil 90+1'	Report	Provod 41'; Zmrzlý 43'	Stadium: Malšovická aréna Attendance: 9,300; Referee: Dalibor Černý

==== Play-off ====
===== First round =====
5 May 2024 First leg	Hradec Králové	3–1	Sigma Olomouc	Hradec Králové
15:00 CEST (UTC+2)	Chvátal 20' (o.g.); Vašulín 42'; Horák 44'	Report	Šíp 13'	Stadium: Malšovická aréna Attendance: 6,529; Referee: Marek Radina

12 May 2024 Second leg	Sigma Olomouc	1–3 (2–6 agg.)	Hradec Králové	Olomouc
15:00 CEST (UTC+2)	Juliš 57'	Report	Vašulín 43'; Pilař 45+2'; Kučera 70'	Stadium: Andrův stadion Attendance: 3,619; Referee: Dominik Starý
Note: Hradec Králové won 6–2 on aggregate.

===== Second round =====
19 May 2024 First leg	Teplice	0–1	Hradec Králové	Teplice
15:00 CEST (UTC+2)		Report	Koubek 87'	Stadium: Na Stínadlech; Attendance: 6,287; Referee: Stanislav Volek

25 May 2024 Second leg	Hradec Králové	2–0 (3–0 agg.)	Teplice	Hradec Králové
18:00 CEST (UTC+2)	Pilař 50', 60' (pen.)	Report		Stadium: Malšovická aréna Attendance: 7,199; Referee: Dominik Starý
Note: Hradec Králové won 3–0 on aggregate.

===== Final =====
31 May 2024 Final	Mladá Boleslav	3–1	Hradec Králové	Mladá Boleslav
18:00 CEST (UTC+2)	Mareček 13'; Kostka 45+1'; Matějovský 54' (pen.)	Report	Čmelík 83' (pen.)	Stadium: Lokotrans Aréna; Attendance: 4,173; Referee: Ondřej Berka
