= 2024–25 SK Sigma Olomouc season =

SK Sigma Olomouc
2024–25 season
- Manager: Tomáš Janotka
- Stadium: Andrův stadion
- Czech First League: 6th
- Czech Cup: Winners
- Top goalscorer: League: Jan Kliment (18); All: Jan Kliment (22)
- Average home league attendance: 5,267
Home colours

The 2024–25 season was the 106th season in the history of SK Sigma Olomouc, and the club's 29th consecutive season in Czech First League. In addition to the domestic league, the team participated in the Czech Cup.

On 29 May 2024, Tomáš Janotka was appointed as manager of the club, having previously managed the club's reserve team.

The club defeated Sparta Prague by 3–1 in the final of the Czech Cup on 14 May 2025. It was the second time the club had won the Czech Cup and the first since they lifted the trophy in 2011–12.

== Transfers ==
=== In ===
Pos.	Player	Transferred from	Fee	Date	Source
MF	(Czech Republic) Jan Sýkora	(Czech Republic) Viktoria Plzeň	Free	3 January 2025	

== Friendlies ==
=== Pre-season ===
23 June 2024 Friendly	Pogoń Szczecin	1–1	Sigma Olomouc	Opalenica, Poland
17:00	Paryzek 84'	Report	Navrátil 14'

28 June 2024 Friendly	Jagiellonia Białystok	1–1	Sigma Olomouc	Opalenica, Poland
11:00	29'	Report	Hadaš 31'	Attendance: 45

3 July 2024 Friendly	Sigma Olomouc	3–0	Trenčín	Slatinice
17:00	Šíp 53'; Beneš 65'; Hadaš 87'			Stadium: Hrište Slatinice

6 July 2024 Friendly	Sigma Olomouc	2–0	Žilina	Slatinice
11:00	Spáčil 29'; Navrátil 81'			Stadium: Hrište Slatinice

13 July 2024 Friendly	Cracovia	0–1	Sigma Olomouc	Rączna, Poland
15:30 UTC+2			Šíp 23'	Stadium: Baza treningowa KS Cracovia

== Competitions ==
=== Czech First League ===
==== Regular season ====
Pos	Team	Pld	W	D	L	GF	GA	GD	Pts	Qualification or relegation
4	Sparta Prague	30	19	5	6	56	33	+23	62	Qualification for the championship group
5	Jablonec	30	15	6	9	47	25	+22	51	Qualification for the championship group
6	Sigma Olomouc	30	12	7	11	46	41	+5	43	Qualification for the championship group
7	Slovan Liberec	30	11	9	10	45	31	+14	42	Qualification for the middle group
8	Karviná	30	11	8	11	40	52	−12	41	Qualification for the middle group

Source: Chance Liga
Rules for classification: 1) Points; 2) Head-to-head points; 3) Head-to-head goal difference; 4) Head-to-head goals scored; 5) Goal difference; 6) Goals scored; 7) Fair-play ranking; 8) Draw.

The match schedule was released on 20 June 2024.

Czech First League match details
Date	Opponent	Venue	Result F–A	Scorers	Attendance	Ref.
20 July 2024	Dynamo České Budějovice	A	2–0	Kliment 56', 71'	3,429	
28 July 2024	Slovan Liberec	A	1–1	Zorvan 63' pen.	3,640	
3 August 2024	FK Teplice	H	2–1	Spáčil 11', Kliment 54'	4,619	
10 August 2024	Slavia Prague	A	0–2		17,724	
18 August 2024	Mladá Boleslav	H	3–2	Mikulenka 21', Kliment 45+4', 90+3'	3,125	
1 September 2024	Baník Ostrava	H	2–2	Kliment 34', 85' pen.	11,328	
17 September 2024	Viktoria Plzeň	A	1–2	Pokorný 89'	7,056	
22 September 2024	Dukla Prague	H	2–1	Kliment 1, 59'	3,380	
27 September 2024	Sparta Prague	A	3–2	Muritala 68', Fiala 78', Zorvan 87'	16,538	
6 October 2024	Bohemians 1905	H	1–3	Mikulenka 69'	4,435	
19 October 2024	Hradec Králové	A	1–1	Mikulenka 13'	6,285	
26 October 2024	FK Jablonec	H	0–0		3,120	
2 November 2024	MFK Karviná	A	1–2	Kliment 37'	2,114	
24 November 2024	Slovan Liberec	H	1–4	Muritala 75'	2,915	
27 November 2024	1. FC Slovácko	H	2–1	Kliment 68', Pokorný 83'	2,836	
30 November 2024	FK Teplice	A	0–1		2,128	
4 December 2024	FK Pardubice	A	2–2	Spáčil 38', Mikulenka 78'	2,475	
8 December 2024	Slavia Prague	H	1–2	Elbel 32'	11,364	
15 December 2024	Mladá Boleslav	A	3–1	Navrátil 5', Spáčil 27', Mikulenka 73'	1,198	
3 February 2025	Viktoria Plzeň	H	2–1	Navrátil 17', Zorvan 36' pen.	3,485	
9 February 2025	Baník Ostrava	A	0–1		2,128	
15 February 2025	FK Pardubice	H	4–0	Spáčil 9', Chvátal 65', Kliment 74', Israel 90'	2,014	
22 February 2025	Dukla Prague	A	3–1	Šíp 23', Breite 51', Kliment 78' pen.	1,021	
1 March 2025	Sparta Prague	H	1–2	Zorvan 37'	12,267	
9 March 2025	Bohemians 1905	A	1–0	Kliment 15' pen.	5,650	
16 March 2025	Hradec Králové	H	1–2	Kliment 62'	2,957	
29 March 2025	FK Jablonec	A	0–0		2,860	
5 April 2025	MFK Karviná	H	1–2	Dolžnikov 20'	3,007	
13 April 2025	1. FC Slovácko	A	2–2	Kliment 33', 74' pen.	3,016	
19 April 2025	Dynamo České Budějovice	H	3–0	Elbel 35', Kliment 59' pen., Šíp 80'	2,606	

==== Championship round ====
Pos	Team	Pld	W	D	L	GF	GA	GD	Pts	Qualification or relegation
1	Slavia Prague (C)	35	29	3	3	77	18	+59	90	Qualification for the Champions League league phase
2	Viktoria Plzeň	35	23	5	7	71	36	+35	74	Qualification for the Champions League second qualifying round
3	Baník Ostrava	35	22	5	8	58	34	+24	71	Qualification for the Europa League second qualifying round
4	Sparta Prague	35	19	6	10	61	44	+17	63	Qualification for the Conference League second qualifying round
5	Jablonec	35	19	6	10	60	33	+27	63	
6	Sigma Olomouc	35	12	9	14	48	53	−5	45	Qualification for the Europa League play-off round (Note: The winner of the 2024–25 Czech Cup (Sigma Olomouc) qualifies for the Europa League play-off round.)

Source: Chance Liga
Rules for classification: 1) Total points; 2) Points earned in regular season; 3) Head-to-head points (regular season); 4) Head-to-head goal difference (regular season); 5) Head-to-head goals scored (regular season); 5) Goal difference (all matches); 6) Goals scored (all matches); 7) Fair-play ranking; 8) Draw.
(C) Champions
Notes:

Czech First League championship round match details
Date	Opponent	Venue	Result F–A	Scorers	Attendance	Ref.
26 April 2025	Slavia Prague	H	0–5		12,237	
3 May 2025	Baník Ostrava	A	0–0		9,512	
10 May 2025	FK Jablonec	A	0–4		2,295	
18 May 2025	Viktoria Plzeň	H	1–2	Chvátal 45+1'	3,840	
24 May 2025	Sparta Prague	A	1–1	Růsek 50'	14,541	

=== Czech Cup ===
Czech Cup match details
Round	Date	Opponent	Venue	Result F–A	Scorers	Attendance	Ref.
Second round	2 October 2024	Slovan Bzenec	A	6–0	Langer 17', Elbel 37', Vraštil 61', Kliment 71', 84', Uriča 77'	1,290	
Third round	30 October 2024	Viktoria Žižkov	A	2–0	Šíp 7', Emmanuel 83'	1,170	
Round of 16	4 March 2025	Hanácká Slavia Kroměříž	H	2–1	Slavíček 39', Kliment 90+4'	1,527	
Quarter-finals	8 April 2025	Slavia Prague	A	1–0	Kliment 28'	13,158	
Semi-finals	22 April 2025	Baník Ostrava	A	3–2	Zorvan 45+1', 66', Dolžnikov 54'	12,039	
Final	14 May 2025	Sparta Prague	H	3–1	Zorvan 4', 45', Mikulenka 45+4	12,014	
