= 2024–25 FC Hradec Králové season =

Hradec Králové
2024–25 season
- Manager: David Horejš
- Stadium: Malšovická aréna
- Czech First League: Pre-season
- Czech Cup: Pre-season
- Average home league attendance: 6,225
colours	Away colours	Third colours

The 2024–25 season is the 120th season in the history of FC Hradec Králové, and the club's fourth consecutive season in Czech First League. In addition to the domestic league, the team is scheduled to participate in the Czech Cup.

== Friendlies ==
=== Pre-season ===
29 June 2024 Friendly	Hradec Králové (Czech Republic)	v	(Czech Republic) Teplice
11:00

29 June 2024 Friendly	Hradec Králové (Czech Republic)	1–1	(Poland) Zagłębie Sosnowiec	Opatovice nad Labem
14:15	Koubek 32'		Snopczyński 82'	Stadium: stadion AFK Opatovice nad Labem); Attendance: 463; Referee: Petr Hocek

6 July 2024 Friendly	Hradec Králové (Czech Republic)	2–0	(Czech Republic) Sparta Prague B	Písek
11:00	Juliš 15'; Klíma 89'			Stadium: Městský sportovní areál

14 July 2024 Friendly	Hradec Králové (Czech Republic)	0–0	(Czech Republic) Táborsko	Hradec Králové
17:00 UTC+2				Stadium: Malšovická aréna

== Competitions ==
=== Overall record ===
Competition	First match	Last match	Starting round	Record							
Competition	First match	Last match	Starting round	Pld	W	D	L	GF	GA	GD	Win %
Czech First League	21 July 2024	19 April 2025	Matchday 1	0	0	0	0	0	0	+0	—
Czech Cup				0	0	0	0	0	0	+0	—
Total				0	0	0	0	0	0	+0	—

Source: Soccerway

=== Czech First League ===
==== League table ====
Pos	Team	Pld	W	D	L	GF	GA	GD	Pts	Qualification or relegation
7	Slovan Liberec	30	11	9	10	45	31	+14	42	Qualification for the middle group
8	Karviná	30	11	8	11	40	52	−12	41	Qualification for the middle group
9	Hradec Králové	30	11	7	12	33	31	+2	40	Qualification for the middle group
10	Bohemians 1905	30	8	10	12	32	42	−10	34 (Note: Head to head points: Bohemians 1905 8, Mladá Boleslav 7, Teplice 1.)	Qualification for the middle group
11	Mladá Boleslav	30	9	7	14	40	40	0	34	Qualification for the relegation group

Source: Chance Liga
Rules for classification: 1) Points; 2) Head-to-head points; 3) Head-to-head goal difference; 4) Head-to-head goals scored; 5) Goal difference; 6) Goals scored; 7) Fair-play ranking; 8) Draw.
Notes:

Pos	Team	Pld	W	D	L	GF	GA	GD	Pts	Qualification or relegation	SLA	PLZ	OST	SPA	JAB	OLO
1	Slavia Prague (C)	35	29	3	3	77	18	+59	90	Qualification for the Champions League league phase	—	4–3	3–0	2–1	—	—
2	Viktoria Plzeň	35	23	5	7	71	36	+35	74	Qualification for the Champions League second qualifying round	—	—	1–2	2–0	4–1	—
3	Baník Ostrava	35	22	5	8	58	34	+24	71	Qualification for the Europa League second qualifying round	—	—	—	3–2	1–2	0–0
4	Sparta Prague	35	19	6	10	61	44	+17	63	Qualification for the Conference League second qualifying round	—	—	—	—	1–3	1–1
5	Jablonec	35	19	6	10	60	33	+27	63		3–2	—	—	—	—	4–0
6	Sigma Olomouc	35	12	9	14	48	53	−5	45	Qualification for the Europa League play-off round (Note: The winner of the 2024–25 Czech Cup (Sigma Olomouc) qualifies for the Europa League play-off round.)	0–5	1–2	—	—	—	—

Source: Chance Liga
Legend: Blue = home team win; Yellow = draw; Red = away team win.
Rules for classification: 1) Total points; 2) Points earned in regular season; 3) Head-to-head points (regular season); 4) Head-to-head goal difference (regular season); 5) Head-to-head goals scored (regular season); 5) Goal difference (all matches); 6) Goals scored (all matches); 7) Fair-play ranking; 8) Draw.
(C) Champions
Notes:

Pos	Team	Pld	W	D	L	GF	GA	GD	Pts	Qualification or relegation	TEP	MLA	SLO	DUK	PCE	CBU
11	Teplice	35	12	8	15	41	45	−4	44		—	—	1–0	2–2	3–0	—
12	Mladá Boleslav	35	11	8	16	48	48	0	41		1–0	—	2–2	2–3	—	—
13	Slovácko	35	9	11	15	31	56	−25	38		—	—	—	3–2	1–0	0–0
14	Dukla Prague (O)	35	8	10	17	34	55	−21	34	Qualification for the relegation play-offs	—	—	—	—	2–0	2–1
15	Pardubice (O)	35	6	7	22	25	56	−31	25	Qualification for the relegation play-offs	—	2–1	—	—	—	1–0
16	České Budějovice (R)	35	0	6	29	16	86	−70	6	Relegation to FNL	0–3	1–2	—	—	—	—

Source: Chance Liga
Legend: Blue = home team win; Yellow = draw; Red = away team win.
Rules for classification: 1) Total points; 2) Points earned in regular season; 3) Head-to-head points (regular season); 4) Head-to-head goal difference (regular season); 5) Head-to-head goals scored (regular season); 5) Goal difference (all matches); 6) Goals scored (all matches); 7) Fair-play ranking; 8) Draw.
(O) Play-off winners; (R) Relegated

==== Results summary ====
Overall								Home						Away					
Pld	W	D	L	GF	GA	GD	Pts	W	D	L	GF	GA	GD	W	D	L	GF	GA	GD
0	0	0	0	0	0	0	0	0	0	0	0	0	0	0	0	0	0	0	0

Source: Chance Liga

==== Results by round ====
Round	1
Ground	
Result	
Position	

Source: Chance Liga
A = Away; H = Home; W = Win; D = Draw; L = Loss

==== Matches ====
The match schedule was released on 20 June 2024.
