= Dominik Hollý =

Slovak footballer

Personal information
- Date of birth: 11 November 2003 (age 22)
- Place of birth: Bánovce nad Bebravou, Slovakia
- Height: 1.81 m (5 ft 11 in)
- Position: Midfielder

Team information
- Current team: Jablonec (on loan from Sparta Prague)

Youth career
- 2011–2013: Spartak Bánovce nad Bebravou
- 2013–: AS Trenčín

Senior career*
Years	Team	Apps	(Gls)
2021–2024	AS Trenčín	48	(4)
2021	→ Dubnica nad Váhom	1	(0)
2024–2025	Jablonec	45	(8)
2025–	Sparta Prague	1	(0)
2025	→ Sparta Prague B	2	(0)
2026	→ Jablonec (loan)	11	(3)
2026–	→ Jablonec (loan)	0	(0)

International career^{‡}
2021	Slovakia U18	2	(0)
2021–2022	Slovakia U19	15	(1)
2022–2023	Slovakia U20	4	(1)
2023–	Slovakia U21	1	(0)
2024–	Slovakia	1	(0)
- * Club domestic league appearances and goals as of 27 May 2026 ‡ National team caps and goals as of 21:26, 5 June 2024 (UTC)

Dominik Hollý (born 11 November 2003) is a Slovak professional footballer who plays as a midfielder for the Czech club Jablonec on loan from Sparta Prague.

== Club career ==
Hollý made his Fortuna Liga debut for AS Trenčín in an away fixture at pod Dubňom against Žilina on 11 September 2021. He came on as a 90th-minute substitute for Samuel Lavrinčík in a 3–1 win for his side. In February 2024, Hollý signed a multi-year contract with Czech club Jablonec. He scored his first goal in the Czech First League for Jablonec in April 2024 in a 3–2 home loss against Baník Ostrava. On 6 June 2025, Hollý signed a multi-year contract with Czech club Sparta Prague, for a fee reported as €1.5 million. On 4 January 2026, Hollý joined Jablonec on a half-year loan deal. On 1 September 2026, Hollý joined Jablonec again on a one-year loan deal without an option to make the transfer permanent.

== International career ==
Hollý was a youth international for Slovakia, being included in his nation's squad for the 2025 UEFA European Under-21 Championship in Slovakia. He was one of three Czech-based players, alongside Tomáš Rigo and Sebastian Nebyla, to play in the opening game of the tournament, which Slovakia lost 3–2 to Spain. He made a second half substitute appearance in Slovakia's second match against Italy, although it resulted in another loss for Slovakia, confirming they could not advance to the knockout stages. He started Slovakia's third and final match against Romania, who were also already eliminated, with Slovakia winning 2–1.

In December 2022, Hollý received his first call-up to the Slovakia national football team for prospective players' training camp at NTC Senec. He made his debut on 5 June 2024 in a friendly match against San Marino, coming on as a substitute to another debutant Tomáš Rigo in the 68th minute of a 4–0 victory in Wiener Neustadt.
