= Renato Pantalon =

Croatian footballer

Personal information
- Date of birth: October 27, 1997 (age 29)
- Place of birth: Zadar, Croatia
- Height: 1.94 m (6 ft 4 in)
- Position: Centre-back

Team information
- Current team: CFR Cluj
- Number: 42

Youth career
- 2006–2016: Zadar

Senior career*
Years	Team	Apps	(Gls)
2015–2017	Zadar	38	(0)
2017–2018	Kustošija	30	(1)
2018–2019	Rudeš	17	(1)
2019–2021	Aluminij	46	(0)
2021–2025	Rio Ave	71	(2)
2025	Estrela Amadora	12	(0)
2025–2026	Jablonec	14	(0)
2026–	CFR Cluj	9	(0)
- * Club domestic league appearances and goals as of 31 October 2026

Renato Pantalon (born 27 October 1997) is a Croatian professional footballer who plays as a centre-back for Liga I club CFR Cluj.

== Professional career ==
Pantalon is a youth product of the Croatian club Zadar, and began his senior career with them in 2015. In 2017, he moved to Kustošija before joining the Croatian Football League club Rudeš for the 208–19 season. On 9 August 2019, he moved to the Slovenian club Aluminij. He moved to Portugal with Rio Ave on 19 July 2021, and in his debut season helped them win the Liga Portugal 2.

== Career statistics ==
=== Club ===
As of match played 31 October 2026

Club	Season	League			National cup (Note: Includes Croatian Cup, Slovenian Cup, Taça de Portugal, Czech Cup, Cupa României)		Europe		Other		Total	
Club	Season	Division	Apps	Goals	Apps	Goals	Apps	Goals	Apps	Goals	Apps	Goals
Zadar	2015–16	2. HNL	15	0	0	0	–		–		15	0
Zadar	2016–17	3. HNL	23	0	1	0	–		–		24	0
Zadar	Total		38	0	1	0	–		–		39	0
Kustošija	2017–18	2. HNL	30	1	–		–		–		30	1
Rudeš	2018–19	1. HNL	17	1	–		–		–		17	1
Aluminij	2019–20	Slovenian PrvaLiga	23	0	3	0	–		–		26	0
Aluminij	2020–21	Slovenian PrvaLiga	23	0	1	0	–		–		24	0
Aluminij	Total		46	0	4	0	–		–		50	0
Rio Ave	2021–22	Liga Portugal 2	21	0	4	0	–		1 (Note: Appearances in Taça da Liga)	0	26	0
Rio Ave	2022–23	Primeira Liga	22	1	1	0	–		3	0	26	1
Rio Ave	2023–24	Primeira Liga	19	1	0	0	–		2	1	21	2
Rio Ave	2024–25	Primeira Liga	9	0	0	0	–		–		9	0
Rio Ave	Total		71	2	5	0	–		6	1	82	3
Estrela Amadora	2024–25	Primeira Liga	12	0	–		–		–		12	0
Estrela Amadora	2025–26	Primeira Liga	0	0	–		–		–		0	0
Estrela Amadora	Total		12	0	–		–		–		12	0
Jablonec	2025–26	Czech First League	14	0	3	0	–		–		17	0
CFR Cluj	2026–27	Liga I	9	0	2	0	3 (Note: Appearances in UEFA Conference League)	0	–		14	0
Career total			258	4	15	0	3	0	6	1	282	5

== Honours ==
Rio Ave

- Liga Portugal 2: 2021–22

Jablonec

- Czech Cup runner-up: 2025–26
