= Ebrima Singhateh =

Gambian footballer (born 2003)

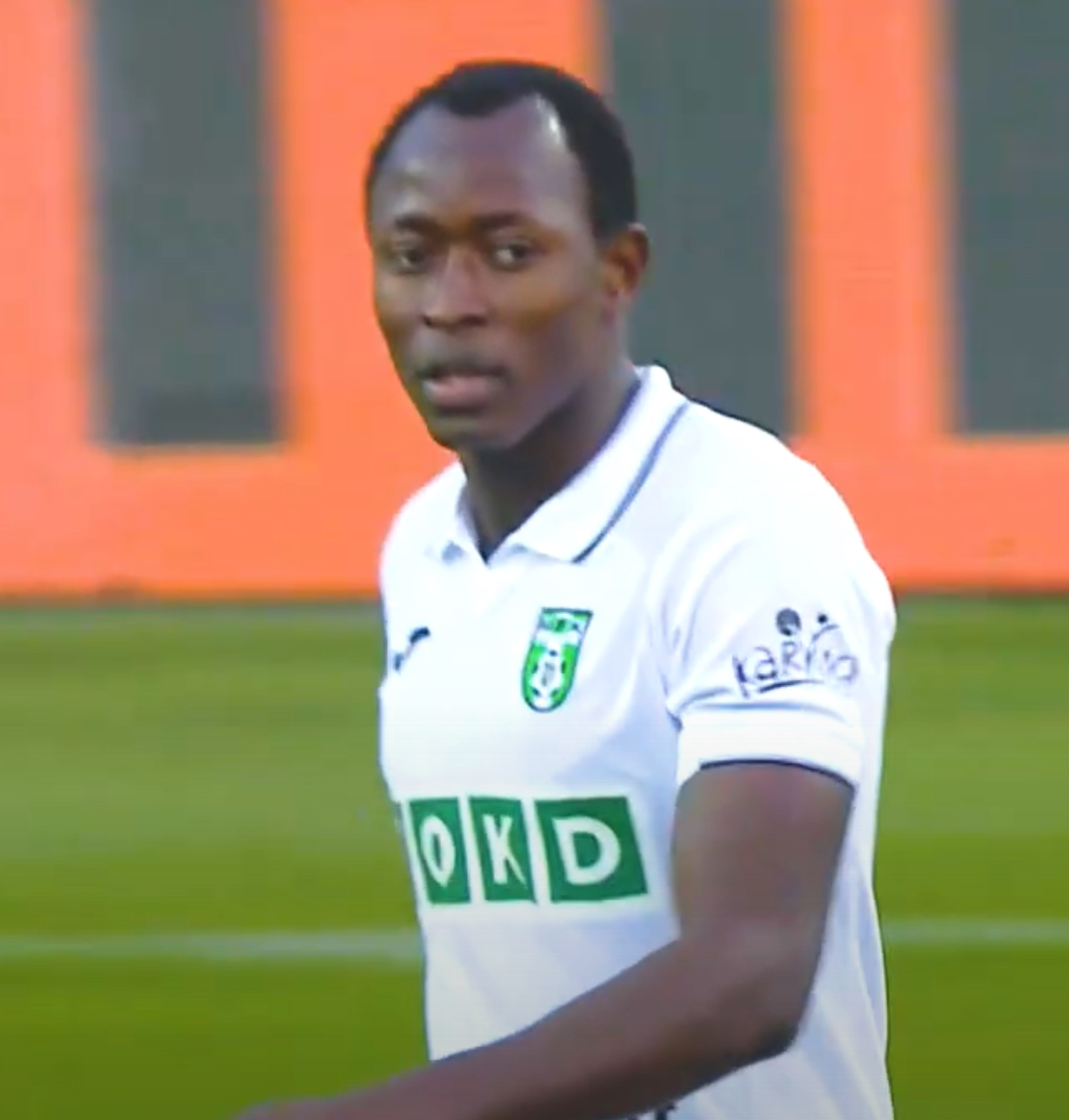
- Singhateh in 2024

Personal information
- Date of birth: 10 September 2003 (age 23)
- Place of birth: Kunkujang Keitaya, Gambia
- Height: 1.86 m (6 ft 1 in)
- Position: Forward

Team information
- Current team: Sparta Prague

Youth career
- -2022: Real de Banjul

Senior career*
Years	Team	Apps	(Gls)
2022	Paide Linnameeskond	22	(9)
2022–2024	Slavia Prague	0	(0)
2023	→ Vlašim (loan)	14	(8)
2024	→ Sigma Olomouc (loan)	10	(1)
2024–2026	Karviná	41	(5)
2024	Karviná B	2	(1)
2026	Jablonec	7	(1)
2026–	Sparta Prague	0	(0)

International career
2023	Gambia U20	7	(0)
- * Club domestic league appearances and goals as of 27 May 2026

Ebrima Singhateh (born 10 September 2003) is a Gambian professional footballer who plays as a forward for Sparta Prague in the Czech First League.

== Club career ==
=== Early career ===
Ebrima, who was born and raised in Baddibu Sabaa located in The Gambia's North Bank Region, later relocated to Kombo where he played for Kunkujang Friends and Falcons. Additionally, he participated in Nawettan in Medina Tallinding. In 2019, he achieved a significant milestone by entering the Gambian First Division, representing the renowned club Real De Banjul. He dedicated two and a half years to Real before transferring to the Estonian club Paide Linnameeskond.

=== Paide ===
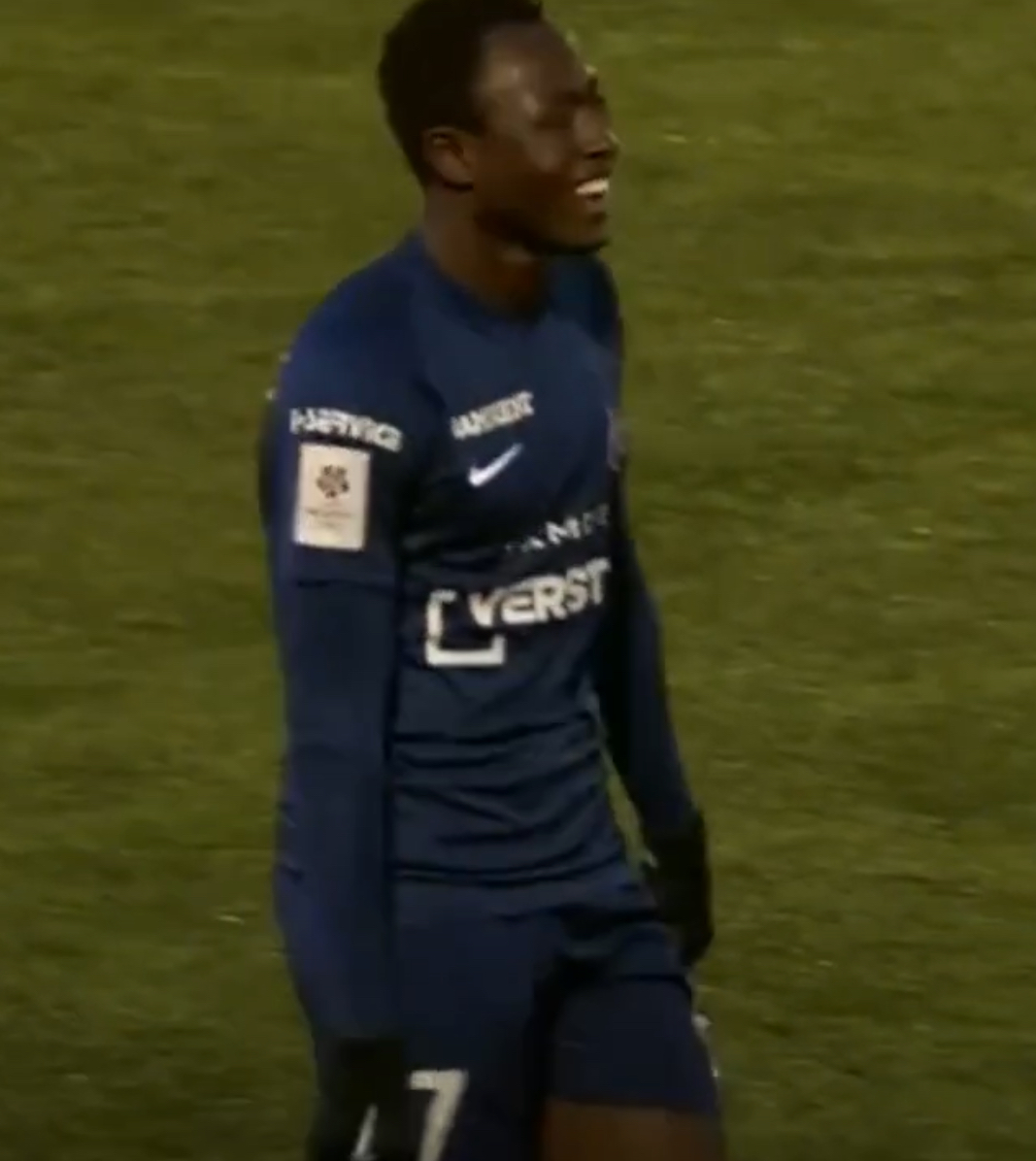
Singhateh with Paide in 2022.

In January 2022, Singhateh became a player of the Estonian first division club Paide Linnameeskond, where he spent a successful six months after arriving from Real de Banjul. In the fourth team of the Estonian top division, Singhateh played mostly from the bench. Despite the low minutes played in the league, 824 minutes, he scored nine goals. He celebrated the victory in the Estonian Cup with Paide.

In the summer of 2022, he also played in the preliminary round of the European Conference League, converting a penalty kick against Dinamo Tbilisi in extra time of the second match and sending the match to a penalty shootout.

=== Slavia Prague ===
Singhateh transferred from Estonian Paide to Czech side Slavia Prague in the summer of 2022. He spent the 2022/23 season mostly playing in Slavia's reserve team.

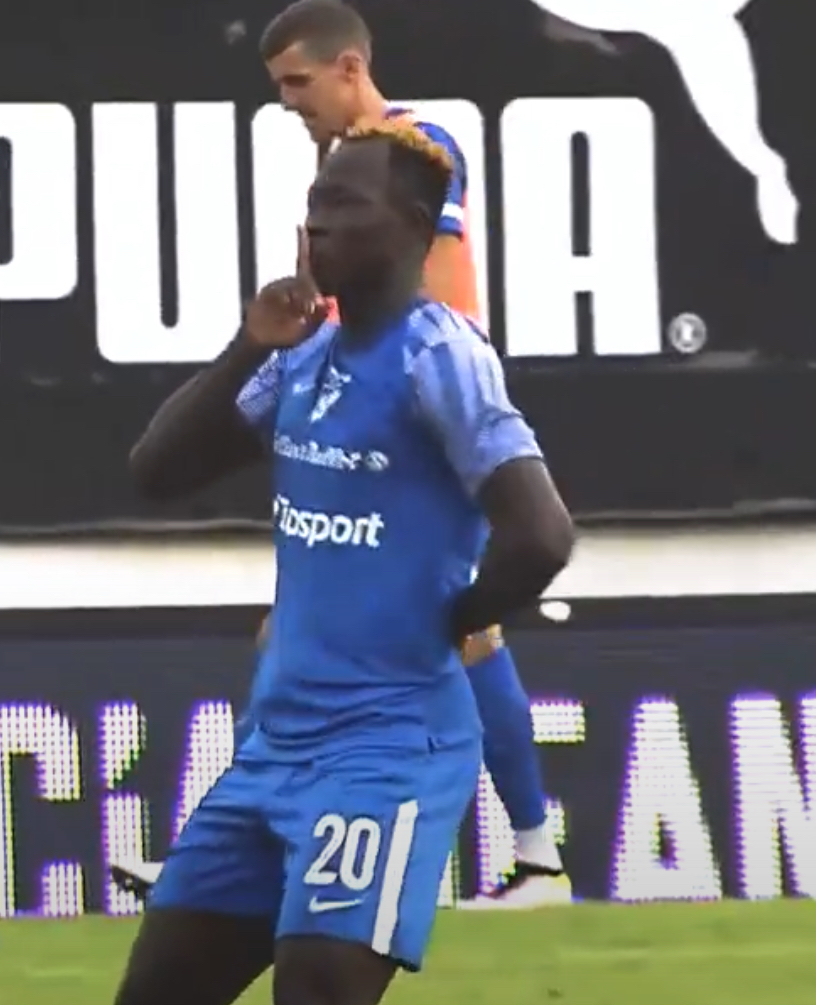
Singhateh celebrating a goal against Zbrojovka Brno.

=== Vlašim (loan) ===
In the summer of 2023, he went on loan to Czech second-league side FC Vlašim. He scored his first goal for the club in a 1–1 draw against Zbrojovka Brno.

Singhateh played in eighteen second league and two cup matches for Vlašim in the autumn, scoring a total of nine goals.

=== Sigma Olomouc (loan) ===
In January 2024, his loan spell in Vlašim was terminated early, he immediately went on a one-year loan to the first-league Sigma Olomouc. He made his debut in the Czech top flight on 10 February in a 2–0 loss to Slovan Liberec. He played regularly for the rest of the spring season and scored his first goal for Sigma on 6 April in a 3–2 loss to FC Zlín. He played in 10 matches for Olomouc.

=== Karviná ===
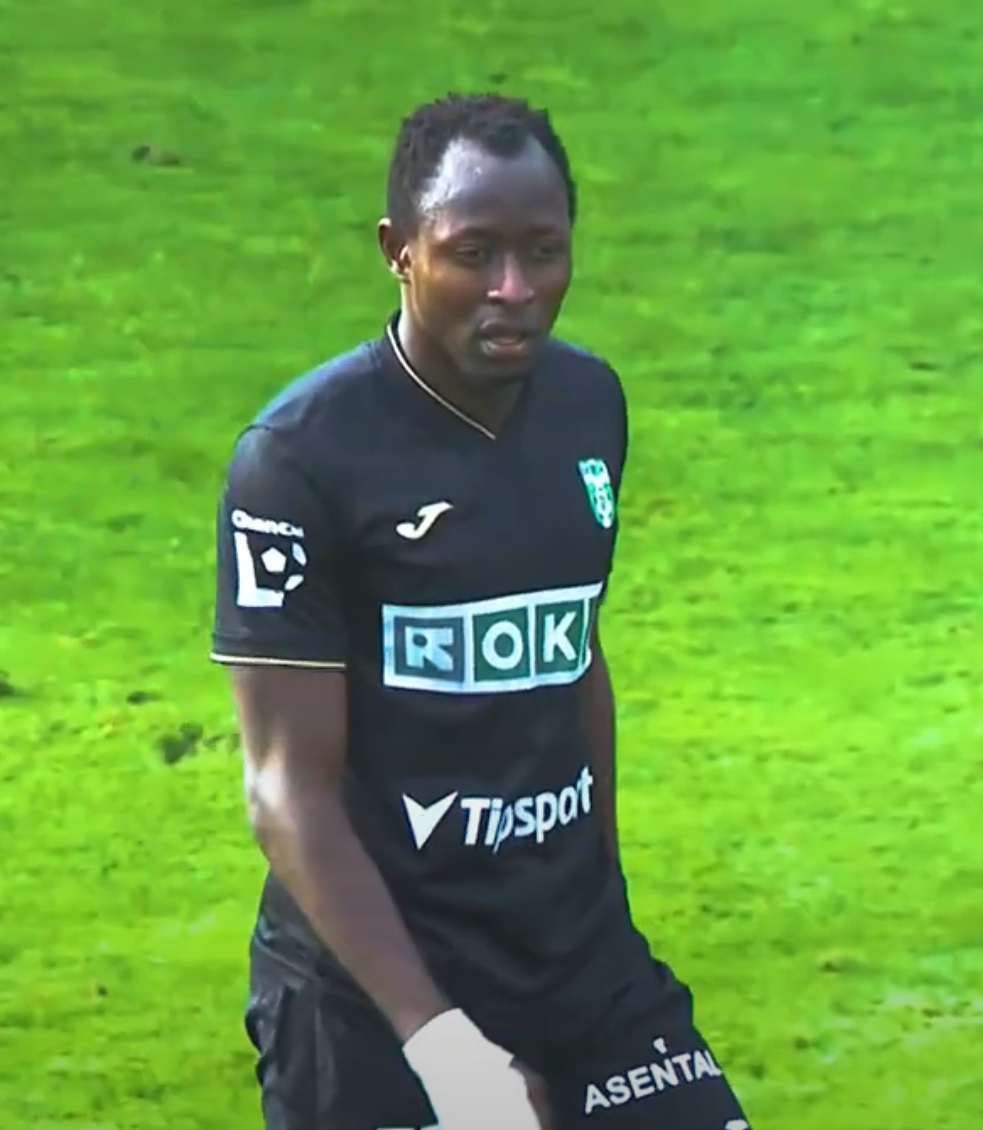
Singhateh with Karvina in 2024.

In the summer of 2024, after his one-year loan at Sigma Olomouc ended, the Gambian striker did not participate in training and the Slavia management terminated his contract. Subsequently, Singateh transferred from Slavia to Karviná.

Singateh scored the winning goal in a 3–2 win against Czech First League side Slovan Liberec.

=== Jablonec ===
On 12 February 2026, Singateh signed a multi-year contract with Czech First League club Jablonec.

=== Sparta Prague ===
On 4 June 2026, Singateh signed a multi-year contract with Czech First League club Sparta Prague.

== International career ==
In the winter of 2023, he participated in the Under-20 Africa Cup of Nations and the Under-20 World Cup with the Gambian U-20 national team. He appeared in a total of seven matches, but did not score a goal.
