= Karel Spáčil =

Czech footballer (born 2003)

Personal information
- Date of birth: 18 May 2003 (age 23)
- Place of birth: Prostějov, Czech Republic
- Height: 1.89 m (6 ft 2 in)
- Position: Centre-back

Team information
- Current team: FC Viktoria Plzeň
- Number: 5

Youth career
- 2010–2022: Prostějov

Senior career*
Years	Team	Apps	(Gls)
2022–2023	Prostějov	12	(0)
2022	→ SK Lipová (loan)	15	(0)
2023	→ Blansko (loan)	13	(0)
2024	Hradec Králové	31	(5)
2025–	Viktoria Plzeň	24	(1)
2025	→ Hradec Králové (loan)	15	(1)

International career
2023	Czech Republic U20	3	(0)
2024–2025	Czech Republic U21	8	(1)
- * Club domestic league appearances and goals as of 27 May 2026

Karel Spáčil (born 18 May 2003) is a Czech professional footballer who plays as a defender for FC Viktoria Plzeň.

== Club career ==
Spáčil was raised in 1. SK Prostějov. As a junior, he played as a defensive midfielder. He made his debut in senior football in 2022 at the age of 19, when Prostějov sent him on half-year loan to SK Lipová that played in the amateur Regional Championship (5th tier of Czech football system). The following six months he was on loan at FK Blansko, playing in the Moravian-Silesian Football League (3rd tier). In the first half of the 2023–24 season, he played for Prostějov in the Czech National Football League (2nd tier), making his debut in professional competition, but at the beginning of 2024 he transferred to FC Hradec Králové in the Czech First League.

Spáčil made his Czech First League debut for Hradec Králové on 17 February 2024 in their 0–0 away draw against Sigma Olomouc. At the beginning of 2024, he transferred to FC Viktoria Plzeň, but was still on loan in Hradec Králové until the end of the 2024–25 season.

== International career ==
Spáčil played for the U20 and U21 Czech Republic youth national teams. He helped the U21 team to qualify to 2025 UEFA European Under-21 Championship. He was in the starting line-up in two matches in the final tournament and scored one goal.

== Career statistics ==
=== Club ===
As of 7 March 2026

Appearances and goals by club, season and competition
Club	Season	League			National cup (Note: Includes Czech Cup)		Continental		Other		Total	
Club	Season	Division	Apps	Goals	Apps	Goals	Apps	Goals	Apps	Goals	Apps	Goals
Prostějov	2023–24	Chance Národní Liga	12	0	1	0	—		—		13	0
Blansko (loan)	2022–2023	Moravskoslezská fotbalová liga	13	0	0	0	—		—		13	0
Hradec Králové	2023–2024	Czech First League	10	3	0	0	—		5 (Note: Appearances in Czech First League European Playoffs)	0	15	3
Hradec Králové	2024–2025	Czech First League	27	3	3	0	—		4	0	34	3
Hradec Králové	Total		37	6	3	0	0	0	9	0	49	6
Viktoria Plzeň	2025–2026	Czech First League	17	1	2	1	11 (Note: Four appearances and one goal in UEFA Champions League, seven appearances and two goals in UEFA Europa League)	3	—		30	5
Career total			79	7	6	1	11	3	9	0	105	11
