= Tomáš Michálek =

Czech footballer

Personal information
- Date of birth: 27 November 1977 (age 48)
- Place of birth: Czechoslovakia
- Height: 1.78 m (5 ft 10 in)
- Position: Midfielder

Youth career
- 1983–1985: Spartak Pečky
- 1985–1989: Bohemians Prague
- 1989–1997: Sparta Prague

Senior career*
Years	Team	Apps	(Gls)
1997–2000	Český Brod		
2000–2001	Mogul Kolín		
2001–2005	Jablonec	119	(29)
2006	Malatyaspor	7	(0)
2006–2008	Wisła Płock	44	(4)
2008–2012	Jablonec	62	(5)
2010	→ Zbrojovka Brno (loan)	13	(4)
2011	→ Bohemians 1905 (loan)	10	(0)
2012–2016	USV Oed/Zeillern	105	(38)
2016–2018	Union Saxen		
- * Club domestic league appearances and goals

Tomáš Michálek (born 27 November 1977) is a Czech former professional footballer who plays as a midfielder.
