= Jan Kliment =

Czech footballer (born 1993)

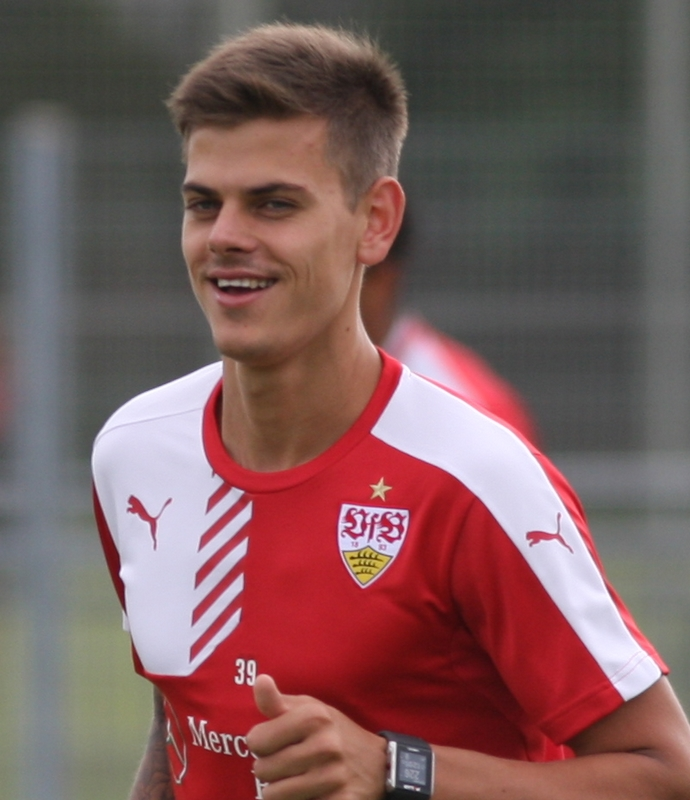
- Kliment training with VfB Stuttgart in 2015

Personal information
- Date of birth: 1 September 1993 (age 33)
- Place of birth: Jihlava, Czech Republic
- Height: 1.85 m (6 ft 1 in)
- Position: Forward

Team information
- Current team: Sigma Olomouc
- Number: 9

Youth career
- 1999–2012: Vysočina Jihlava

Senior career*
| Years | Team | Apps | (Gls) |
| 2012–2015 | Vysočina Jihlava | 31 | (3) |
| 2014 | → Dukla Banská Bystrica (loan) | 13 | (0) |
| 2015–2020 | VfB Stuttgart | 8 | (1) |
| 2015–2020 | VfB Stuttgart II | 17 | (6) |
| 2016–2018 | → Brøndby (loan) | 39 | (7) |
| 2020–2021 | 1. FC Slovácko | 34 | (10) |
| 2021–2022 | Wisła Kraków | 22 | (2) |
| 2022–2024 | Viktoria Plzeň | 34 | (5) |
| 2024– | Sigma Olomouc | 33 | (19) |

International career^{‡}
| 2011 | Czech Republic U19 | 1 | (0) |
| 2013 | Czech Republic U20 | 2 | (0) |
| 2015 | Czech Republic U21 | 5 | (4) |
| 2017– | Czech Republic | 10 | (1) |
- * Club domestic league appearances and goals as of 27 May 2026 ‡ National team caps and goals as of 26 March 2026

Jan Kliment (born 1 September 1993) is a Czech professional footballer who plays as a forward for Sigma Olomouc and the Czech Republic national team.

== Club career ==
=== Early career ===
Kliment began his football career for Vysočina Jihlava before joining its senior team. Following his rise to prominence at the 2015 UEFA European Under-21 Championship, where he won the Golden Boot, he departed for VfB Stuttgart prior to the 2015–16 season, signing a deal through 2019.

On 30 August 2016, Kliment was loaned out to Brøndby IF until the end of the season. On 7 July 2017, the loan deal was extended for another season.

In January 2020, Kliment left Stuttgart and returned to the Czech Republic joining 1. FC Slovácko.

=== Viktoria Plzeň ===
In June 2022, Kliment left Wisła Kraków following their relegation from the Ekstraklasa and returned to the Czech Republic again, joining Viktoria Plzeň.

Kliment made his debut for the club on 26 July 2022 against HJK in the first qualifying round of the UEFA Champions League. He was a second-half substitute for Tomáš Chorý and marked his debut with a goal as Viktoria won 7–1 on aggregate. His league debut came four days later and again he scored a goal as Viktoria Plzeň drew 2–2 with Teplice. On 23 August, Kliment scored the match winner against Qarabağ in the play-off round of the UEFA Champions League to secure Viktoria Plzeň's passage to the group phase for the fourth time in club history.

=== Sigma Olomouc ===
On 31 May 2024, Kliment as a free agent signed a two-year contract with Sigma Olomouc.

Kliment made his debut for Sigma Olomouc on 20 July and scored both goals in a 2–0 league victory over České Budějovice. He made an impressive start to his time at Sigma Olomouc, scoring nine goals in his first nine league matches for the club and adding a further two goals in his first Czech Cup match of the season.

== International career ==
On 20 June 2015, Kliment scored a hat-trick for the Czech under-21 team in a 4–0 win over Serbia in the group stage of the 2015 UEFA European Under-21 Championship at Letná Stadium in Prague. He was awarded the Golden Boot as highest goalscorer of the tournament with 3 goals.

Kliment debuted for the Czech senior squad on 1 September 2017 in the 2018 FIFA World Cup qualification match against Germany.

In October 2024, following his good start to the 2024–25 season, Kliment was called up to the national team for the first time in seven years for 2024–25 UEFA Nations League matches against Albania and Ukraine. On his eighth appearance for the Czech Republic, Kliment scored his first international goal, striking with a header in the 95th minute of a 4–0 World Cup qualification victory against Gibraltar in Portugal.

On 26 March 2026, Kliment came on as a substitute against the Republic of Ireland in the 2026 FIFA World Cup play-off semi-final. The match finished 2–2 after extra time, and Kliment scored the decisive penalty as the Czech Republic won the shoot-out 4–3 to reach the play-off final against Denmark. The Czech Republic went on to beat Denmark on penalties in the play-off final to qualify for the 2026 FIFA World Cup, their first appearance at the finals since 2006. Kliment was named in the Czech Republic's preliminary squad for the tournament but was not included in the final squad.

== Career statistics ==
=== Club ===
As of matches played on 10 May 2026

Appearances and goals by club, season and competition
| Club | Season | League | | | National cup (Note: Includes Czech Cup, DFB-Pokal, Danish Cup, Polish Cup) | | Continental | | Other | | Total | |
| Club | Season | Division | Apps | Goals | Apps | Goals | Apps | Goals | Apps | Goals | Apps | Goals |
|---|---|---|---|---|---|---|---|---|---|---|---|---|
| Vysočina Jihlava | 2011–12 | Czech 2. Liga | 1 | 0 | – | | — | | — | | 1 | 0 |
| Vysočina Jihlava | 2012–13 | Czech First League | 9 | 1 | 1 | 0 | — | | — | | 10 | 1 |
| Vysočina Jihlava | 2013–14 | Czech First League | 6 | 0 | 3 | 0 | — | | — | | 9 | 0 |
| Vysočina Jihlava | 2014–15 | Czech First League | 15 | 2 | 0 | 0 | — | | — | | 15 | 2 |
| Vysočina Jihlava | Total | | 31 | 3 | 4 | 0 | 0 | 0 | 0 | 0 | 35 | 3 |
| Dukla Banská Bystrica (loan) | 2013–14 | Slovak Super Liga | 13 | 0 | 0 | 0 | — | | — | | 13 | 0 |
| VfB Stuttgart II | 2015–16 | 3. Liga | 1 | 0 | — | | — | | — | | 1 | 0 |
| VfB Stuttgart II | 2019–20 | Oberliga BW | 16 | 6 | — | | — | | — | | 17 | 6 |
| VfB Stuttgart II | Total | | 17 | 6 | 0 | 0 | 0 | 0 | 0 | 0 | 17 | 6 |
| VfB Stuttgart | 2015–16 | Bundesliga | 8 | 1 | 2 | 0 | — | | — | | 10 | 1 |
| VfB Stuttgart | 2018–19 | Bundesliga | 0 | 0 | 0 | 0 | — | | — | | 0 | 0 |
| VfB Stuttgart | Total | | 8 | 1 | 2 | 0 | 0 | 0 | 0 | 0 | 10 | 1 |
| Brøndby (loan) | 2016–17 | Danish Superliga | 16 | 1 | 3 | 0 | — | | 2 | 0 | 21 | 1 |
| Brøndby (loan) | 2017–18 | Danish Superliga | 23 | 6 | 1 | 0 | 2 (Note: Appearances in UEFA Europa League) | 0 | 1 | 0 | 27 | 6 |
| Brøndby (loan) | Total | | 39 | 7 | 4 | 0 | 2 | 0 | 3 | 0 | 48 | 7 |
| 1. FC Slovácko | 2019–20 | Czech First League | 3 | 0 | 1 | 0 | — | | — | | 4 | 0 |
| 1. FC Slovácko | 2020–21 | Czech First League | 31 | 10 | 2 | 3 | — | | — | | 33 | 13 |
| 1. FC Slovácko | Total | | 34 | 10 | 3 | 3 | — | | — | | 37 | 13 |
| Wisła Kraków | 2021–22 | Ekstraklasa | 22 | 2 | 3 | 2 | — | | — | | 25 | 4 |
| Viktoria Plzeň | 2022–23 | Czech First League | 12 | 3 | 0 | 0 | 6 (Note: Appearances in UEFA Champions League) | 4 | — | | 18 | 7 |
| Viktoria Plzeň | 2023–24 | Czech First League | 22 | 2 | 4 | 0 | 12 (Note: Appearance(s) in UEFA Conference League) | 0 | — | | 38 | 2 |
| Viktoria Plzeň | Total | | 34 | 5 | 4 | 0 | 18 | 4 | — | | 52 | 9 |
| Sigma Olomouc | 2024–25 | Czech First League | 21 | 18 | 3 | 4 | — | | — | | 24 | 22 |
| Sigma Olomouc | 2025–26 | Czech First League | 12 | 1 | 0 | 0 | 5 | 0 | — | | 17 | 1 |
| Sigma Olomouc | Total | | 33 | 19 | 3 | 4 | 5 | 0 | — | | 41 | 23 |
| Career total | | | 231 | 53 | 23 | 9 | 25 | 4 | 3 | 0 | 282 | 66 |

=== International ===
As of match played 26 March 2026

Appearances and goals by national team and year
| National team | Year | Apps | Goals |
|---|---|---|---|
| Czech Republic | 2017 | 5 | 0 |
| Czech Republic | 2024 | 3 | 0 |
| Czech Republic | 2025 | 1 | 1 |
| Czech Republic | 2026 | 1 | 0 |
| Total | | 10 | 1 |

As of match played 25 March 2025
Scores and results list Czech Republic's goal tally first, score column indicates score after each Kliment goal.

List of international goals scored by Jan Kliment
| No. | Date | Venue | Opponent | Score | Result | Competition |
|---|---|---|---|---|---|---|
| 1 | 25 March 2025 | Estádio Algarve, Faro/Loulé, Portugal | Gibraltar | 4–0 | 4–0 | 2026 FIFA World Cup qualification |

== Honours ==
Brøndby IF

- Danish Cup: 2017–18

Sigma Olomouc

- Czech Cup: 2024–25

Individual

- Czech First League Top scorer: 2024–25
- UEFA European Under-21 Championship Golden Boot: 2015
