= Michal Špit =

Czech footballer (born 1975)

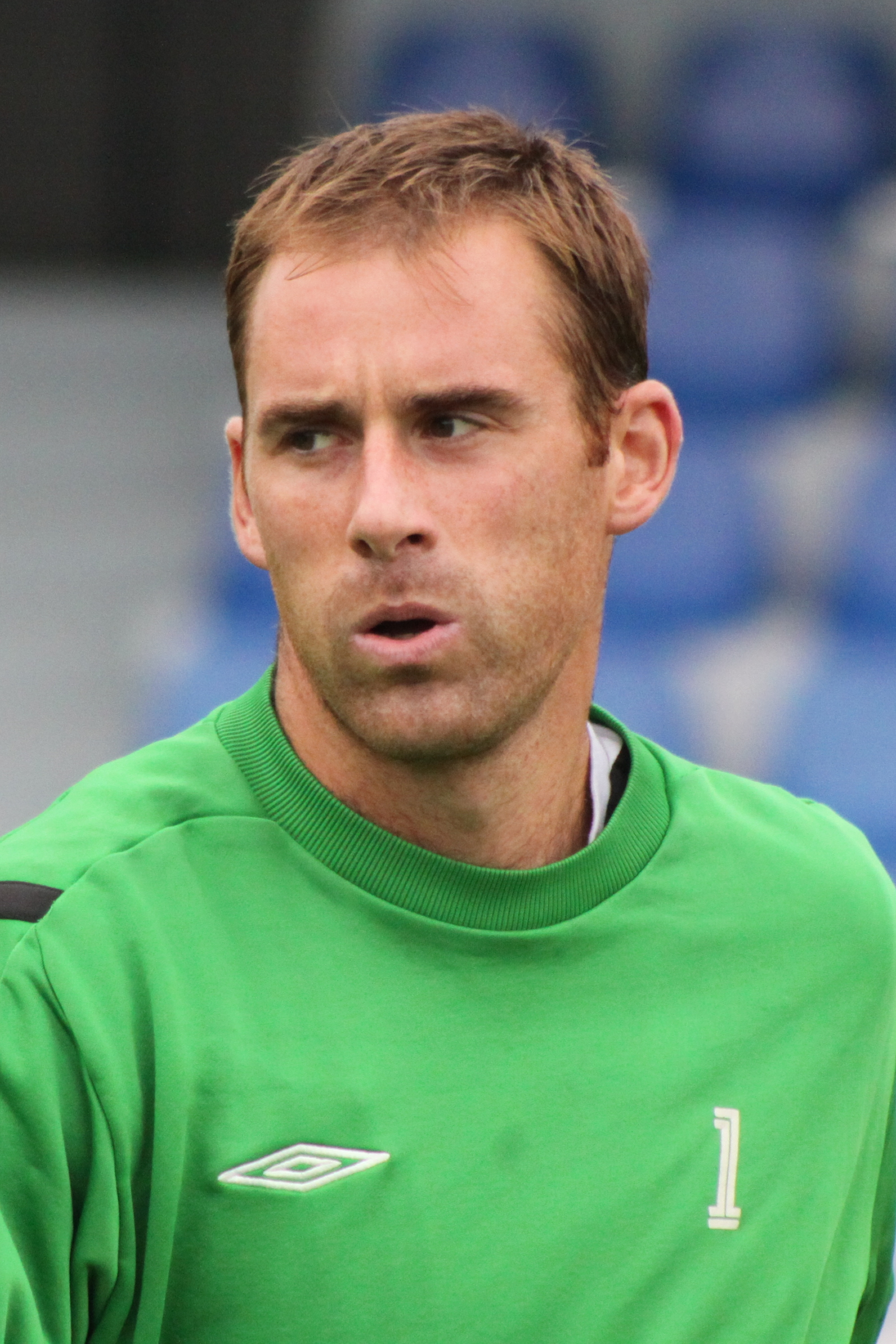

Personal information
- Date of birth: 9 April 1975 (age 51)
- Place of birth: Prague, Czechoslovakia
- Height: 1.97 m (6 ft 6 in)
- Position: Goalkeeper

Senior career*
Years	Team	Apps	(Gls)
1993–1994	VTJ Znojmo		
1994–1995	Sparta Prague		
1996	Jablonec		
1996–1998	Sparta Prague		
1999	Chrudim		
1999	Sparta Prague		
2000–2001	Marila Příbram	30	(0)
2001–2003	Sparta Prague	6	(0)
2004–2016	Jablonec	262	(0)
- * Club domestic league appearances and goals as of 10 February 2018

Michal Špit (born 9 April 1975) is a retired footballer from the Czech Republic. In his playing career, he played for teams including Jablonec and Sparta Prague.

In the 2006–07 Czech First League, Špit was one of four players in the league to play every minute of every match.
