= Lamin Jawo =

Gambian footballer (born 1995)

- Jawo with Jablonec in 2026

Personal information
- Date of birth: 15 March 1995 (age 31)
- Place of birth: Banjul, Gambia
- Height: 1.95 m (6 ft 5 in)
- Position: Forward

Team information
- Current team: Jablonec
- Number: 44

Youth career
- Steve Biko

Senior career*
Years	Team	Apps	(Gls)
2014–2015	Vado	26	(3)
2015–2016	FBC Finale	26	(21)
2016–2018	Carpi	3	(0)
2017	→ Robur Siena (loan)	9	(1)
2017	→ FeralpiSalò (loan)	11	(0)
2018	Sanremese	13	(0)
2018–2019	Olympia Agnonese	18	(3)
2019–2020	Vysočina Jihlava	18	(5)
2020–2022	Zlín	70	(5)
2023–2025	Mladá Boleslav	47	(10)
2025	→ Jablonec (loan)	15	(5)
2025–	Jablonec	32	(9)
- * Club domestic league appearances and goals as of 27 May 2026

Lamin Jawo (born 15 March 1995) is a Gambian professional footballer who plays as a forward for Czech First League club Jablonec.

== Career ==
After a trial at Vysočina Jihlava in January 2019, the club announced on 29 January, that the player had signed a contract until June 2020. On 21 January 2020, he was bought free by Czech First League club Trinity Zlín, where he signed a three-year deal. On 22 January 2023, he was bought free by Czech First League club Mladá Boleslav, where he signed a three-year deal.

On 19 January 2025, Jawo joined Jablonec on a half-year loan deal with an option to make the transfer permanent.

On 3 July 2025, Jawo signed a multi-year contract with Jablonec.
