= Jan Hanuš (footballer) =

Czech footballer

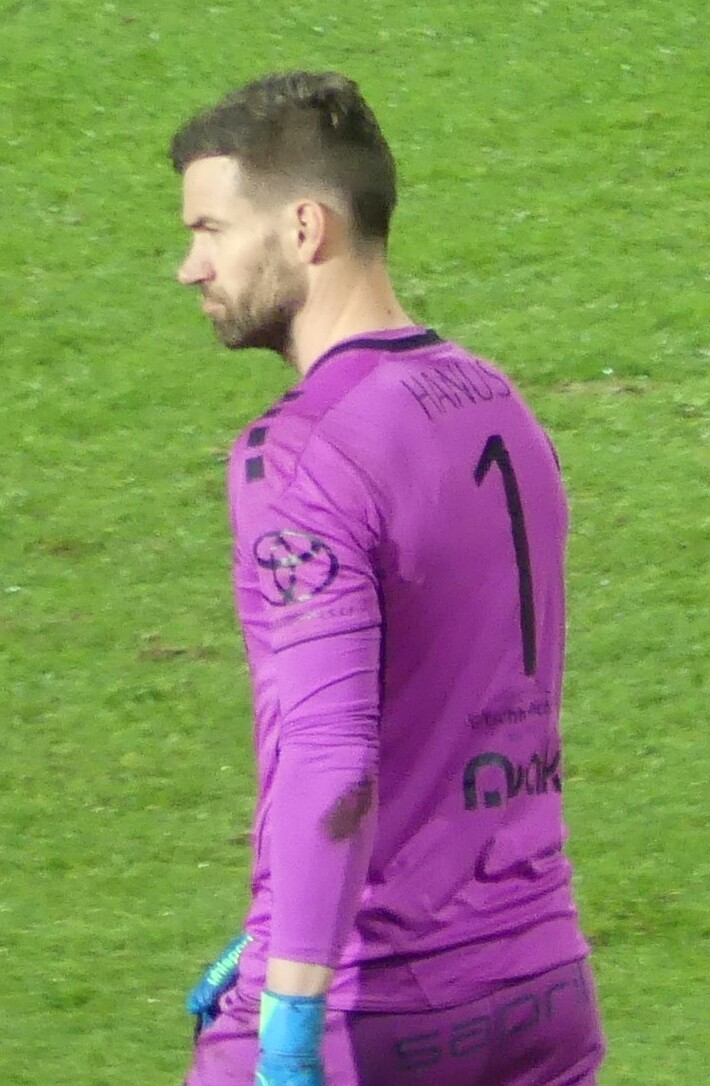
- Hanuš in 2023

Personal information
- Date of birth: 28 April 1988 (age 38)
- Place of birth: Chlumec nad Cidlinou, Czechoslovakia
- Height: 1.88 m (6 ft 2 in)
- Position: Goalkeeper

Team information
- Current team: Jablonec
- Number: 1

Senior career*
Years	Team	Apps	(Gls)
2009–2013	Slavia Prague	7	(0)
2010	→ FC Hlučín (loan)	7	(0)
2010	→ Hradec Králové (loan)	5	(0)
2012	→ Vlašim (loan)	12	(0)
2012–2013	→ Vysočina Jihlava (loan)	2	(0)
2013–2017	Vysočina Jihlava	103	(0)
2018–	Jablonec	187	(0)
2019	→ Jablonec B	1	(0)

International career
2010–2011	Czech Republic U21	3	(0)
- * Club domestic league appearances and goals as of 27 May 2026

Jan Hanuš (born 28 April 1988) is a Czech footballer who currently plays for FK Jablonec as a goalkeeper.

== International career ==
Hanuš was called up to the Czech Republic under-21 squad for the 2011 UEFA European Under-21 Championship.
