= Nassim Innocenti =

Burkinabé-French footballer (born 2002)

Personal information
- Full name: Nassim Patrice Innocenti
- Date of birth: 19 February 2002 (age 24)
- Place of birth: Crest, France
- Height: 1.87 m (6 ft 2 in)
- Position: Centre-back

Team information
- Current team: Jablonec
- Number: 90

Youth career
- 2011–2015: Entente Crest-Aouste
- 2015–2018: Lyon
- 2018–2020: Lille

Senior career*
Years	Team	Apps	(Gls)
2020–2022	Lille II	16	(0)
2022–2024	Valenciennes II	7	(0)
2022–2024	Valenciennes	9	(0)
2024–2025	Košice	31	(1)
2025–	Jablonec	15	(0)
- * Club domestic league appearances and goals as of 18 September 2026

Nassim Patrice Innocenti (born 19 February 2002) is a Burkinabé-French professional footballer who plays as a centre-back for Czech First League club Jablonec. Born in France, he was called up to the Burkina Faso national football team, but did not debut for the team.

== Early life ==
Innocenti was born and raised in France, but his father is Italian and his mother, born in Ivory Coast, is a Burkinabe citizen. Innocenti has both French and Burkinabe passports.

== Club career ==
Innocenti is a product of the youth academies of Entente Crest-Aouste, Lyon and Lille. On 29 June 2020, he signed his first professional contract with Lille, tying him until June 2023. Unable to get first team reps at Lille, he transferred to Valenciennes on 16 July 2022. He made his professional debut and Ligue 2 debut with Valenciennes as an early substitute in a 1–0 win over Le Havre on 6 August 2022.

On 2 February 2024, Innocenti signed a contract until the end of 2025 with Košice in Slovakia.

On 25 June 2025, Innocenti signed a multi-year contract with Czech First League club Jablonec.

== International career ==
Innocenti was called up to the France U19s in March 2021. In March 2023, he was called up to the Burkina Faso national football team, but he did not debut for the team and remained only among the substitutes.
