= Cletus Nombil =

Ghanaian professional footballer

Personal information
- Full name: Cletus Daho Nombil
- Date of birth: 23 August 2000 (age 26)
- Place of birth: Ghana
- Height: 1.92 m (6 ft 4 in)
- Position: Defensive midfielder

Team information
- Current team: Zlín
- Number: 19

Senior career*
Years	Team	Apps	(Gls)
2017–2020	Dreams	21	(0)
2020	→ Eleven Wonders (loan)	0	(0)
2020–2022	Hapoel Jerusalem	49	(0)
2022	→ Hapoel Kfar Saba (loan)	13	(2)
2023	Petržalka	16	(0)
2024–	Zlín	67	(4)
- * Club domestic league appearances and goals as of 27 May 2026

Cletus Daho Nombil (born 23 August 2000) is a Ghanaian professional footballer who plays as a defensive midfielder for Czech First League club FC Zlín. Previously, he played for Ghana Premier League side Dreams and Israeli clubs Hapoel Jerusalem and Hapoel Kfar Saba.

== Career ==
Dreams FC

Nombil joined the senior team of Dreams FC in 2018, initially appearing in the GHALCA Top 8 tournament before making his league debut in the 2018 Ghana Premier League season. His first official league appearance was on 17 March 2018, where he played 78 minutes in a 1–0 victory over Elmina Sharks. Nombil managed four league appearances before the season was interrupted and later abandoned due to the Ghana Football Association's (GFA) dissolution following the Anas Number 12 Exposé. During the GFA Normalization Committee Special Competition in 2019, he featured in five matches and subsequently appeared in twelve league games during the 2019–20 season. In April 2020, he was loaned to Techiman Eleven Wonders, but he left to join Hapoel Jerusalem before the season commenced, resulting in no league appearances for Eleven Wonders.

Hapoel Jerusalem

In September 2020, Nombil joined Israeli club Hapoel Jerusalem on a one-year loan, with an option for a permanent transfer.

FC Zlín

In January 2024, Nombil signed a three-and-a-half-year contract with Czech First League club FC Zlín, marking a new phase in his career.
