= Daniel Horák =

Czech footballer (born 2000)

Personal information
- Full name: Daniel Horák
- Date of birth: 10 October 2000 (age 26)
- Place of birth: Czech Republic
- Height: 1.84 m (6 ft 0 in)
- Position: Left-back

Team information
- Current team: Hradec Králové
- Number: 26

Youth career
- –2019: Hradec Králové

Senior career*
Years	Team	Apps	(Gls)
2019–2023	Sparta Prague B	45	(6)
2020–2023	Sparta Prague	1	(0)
2020–2021	→ Vysočina Jihlava (loan)	16	(0)
2021	→ Pohronie (loan)	6	(0)
2023–	Hradec Králové	19	(4)

International career
2017	Czech Republic U17	4	(0)
2018	Czech Republic U18	2	(0)
2019	Czech Republic U20	2	(0)
- * Club domestic league appearances and goals as of 23:44, 9 January 2024 (UTC)

Daniel Horák (born 10 October 2000) is a Czech footballer who plays for Hradec Králové as a left-back.

== Club career ==
=== AC Sparta Prague ===
Horák made his professional debut for Sparta Prague against Viktoria Plzeň on 28 June 2020.
