= Filip Zorvan =

Czech footballer (born 1996)

- Zorvan with Jablonec in 2026

Personal information
- Date of birth: 7 April 1996 (age 30)
- Place of birth: Opočno, Czech Republic
- Height: 1.71 m (5 ft 7 in)
- Position: Midfielder

Team information
- Current team: Jablonec
- Number: 8

Youth career
- MFK Nové Město nad Metují
- Hradec Králové

Senior career*
Years	Team	Apps	(Gls)
2014–2020	Hradec Králové	78	(7)
2017	→ Baník Sokolov (loan)	14	(0)
2019	→ Vítkovice (loan)	12	(2)
2020	→ Příbram (loan)	13	(0)
2020–2022	Příbram	39	(3)
2022	Karviná	11	(3)
2022–2025	Sigma Olomouc	92	(7)
2023	Sigma Olomouc B	1	(0)
2025–	Jablonec	27	(2)

International career
2014	Czech Republic U19	3	(0)
- * Club domestic league appearances and goals as of 27 May 2026

Filip Zorvan (born 7 April 1996) is a Czech professional footballer who plays as a midfielder for Czech First League club Jablonec.

== Honours ==
Sigma Olomouc

- Czech Cup: 2024–25
