= Nemanja Tekijaški =

Serbian footballer (born 1997)

- Tekijaški with Jablonec in 2026

Personal information
- Full name: Nemanja Tekijaški
- Date of birth: 2 March 1997 (age 29)
- Place of birth: Pančevo, FR Yugoslavia
- Height: 1.86 m (6 ft 1 in)
- Position: Centre-back

Team information
- Current team: Jablonec
- Number: 4

Youth career
- –2014: Dinamo Pančevo
- 2014–2015: Železničar Pančevo

Senior career*
Years	Team	Apps	(Gls)
2015–2017	Železničar Pančevo	64	(4)
2018–2021	Spartak Subotica	101	(2)
2021–2023	Bruk-Bet Termalica	55	(1)
2023–	Jablonec	100	(8)
- * Club domestic league appearances and goals as of 27 May 2026

Nemanja Tekijaški (Serbian Cyrillic: Немања Текијашки; born 2 March 1997) is a Serbian professional footballer who plays as a centre-back for and captains Czech First League club Jablonec.

== Club career ==
=== Železničar Pančevo ===
Tekijaški came through Dinamo Pančevo youth system and was a part of the club's academy until summer 2014. On 8 August, same year, he joined the local club Železničar, who appeared in the Banat Zone League. After the club won the competition, and promoted to the Serbian League Vojvodina, Tekijaški took a place in the first squad for the 2015–16 campaign. During the season, he made 24 league matches, scoring a single goal for the club. Similar to the previous season, Tekijaški scored once time on 27 matches in the 2016–17 campaign. For the rest of 2017, Tekijaški played with the club in the first half of the 2017–18 season, scoring two goals in victories over Dunav Stari Banovci and Radnički Sremska Mitrovica, when he was also elected for the man of the match.

=== Spartak Subotica ===
Tekijaški joined Spartak Subotica at the beginning of 2018, after which he signed a 3 1/2-year deal with the club on 17 January same year. Tekijaški made his Serbian SuperLiga debut for new club on 16 February 2018, replacing injured Nemanja Ćalasan in 41 minute of the match against Napredak Kruševac.

=== Jablonec ===
On 30 June 2023, Tekijaški joined Czech side Jablonec.

== Career statistics ==
As of 1 January 2019

Appearances and goals by club, season and competition
Club	Season	League			Serbian Cup		Continental		Other		Total	
Club	Season	Division	Apps	Goals	Apps	Goals	Apps	Goals	Apps	Goals	Apps	Goals
Železničar Pančevo	2015–16	Serbian League Vojvodina	24	1	—		—		—		24	1
Železničar Pančevo	2016–17	Serbian League Vojvodina	27	1	—		—		—		27	1
Železničar Pančevo	2017–18	Serbian League Vojvodina	13	2	—		—		2 (Note: Appearances in GFS Pančevo Cup)	0	15	2
Železničar Pančevo	Total		64	4	—		—		2	0	66	4
Spartak Subotica	2017–18	Serbian SuperLiga	9	0	—		—		—		9	0
Spartak Subotica	2018–19	Serbian SuperLiga	16	0	0	0	4 (Note: Appearances in UEFA Europa League)	0	—		20	0
Spartak Subotica	Total		25	0	0	0	4	0	—		29	0
Career total			89	4	0	0	4	0	2	0	95	4

== Personal life ==
Born in Pančevo, Tekijaški finished Gymnasium in his hometown. Beside the football career, he is a student at the University of Belgrade Faculty of Law.
