= Sebastian Nebyla =

Slovak footballer (born 2002)

Personal information
- Date of birth: 25 January 2002 (age 24)
- Place of birth: Gütersloh, Germany
- Height: 1.83 m (6 ft 0 in)
- Position: Midfielder

Team information
- Current team: Jablonec
- Number: 25

Youth career
- 2009–2012: Lokomotíva Trnava
- 2012–2018: Spartak Trnava
- 2018–2020: West Ham United

Senior career*
Years	Team	Apps	(Gls)
2020–2023	DAC Dunajská Streda	54	(4)
2020–2021	→ ŠTK Šamorín	11	(3)
2023–2024	Istra 1961	10	(1)
2024	→ Jablonec (loan)	11	(1)
2024–	Jablonec	72	(12)

International career^{‡}
2016	Slovakia U15	4	(3)
2017–2018	Slovakia U16	11	(3)
2018–2019	Slovakia U17	10	(1)
2019	Slovakia U18	3	(0)
2019–2021	Slovakia U19	5	(1)
2021–2025	Slovakia U21	36	(4)
2026–	Slovakia	1	(0)
- * Club domestic league appearances and goals as of 8 November 2026 ‡ National team caps and goals as of 17 November 2026

Sebastian Nebyla (born 25 January 2002) is a Slovak professional footballer who plays as a midfielder for Czech First League club Jablonec and the Slovakia national team.

== Club career ==
A former youth academy player of Spartak Trnava, Nebyla joined West Ham United in 2018. He spent two seasons at the club, playing for under-18 and under-23 teams in Professional Development League.

On 4 August 2020, Slovak club Dunajská Streda announced the signing of Nebyla on a two-year deal. On 27 September 2020, he made senior team debut for Dunajská Streda's farm team Šamorín in a 2–1 league win against Petržalka.

On 9 June 2023, Croatian club Istra 1961 announced the arrival of Nebyla on a three-year contract. On 28 January 2024, he joined Czech club Jablonec on a loan deal until the end of the season.

== International career ==
Born in Germany, Nebyla has represented Slovakia at various youth levels.

== Career statistics ==
=== International ===
As of match played 16 November 2026

Appearances and goals by national team and year
National team	Year	Apps	Goals
Slovakia	2026	1	0
Total		1	0
