= Jáchym Šíp =

Czech footballer

Personal information
- Date of birth: 22 January 2003 (age 23)
- Place of birth: Kroměříž, Czech Republic
- Height: 1.76 m (5 ft 9 in)
- Position: Winger

Team information
- Current team: Sigma Olomouc
- Number: 6

Youth career
- TJ Loukov
- Bystřice pod Hostýnem
- Sigma Olomouc

Senior career*
Years	Team	Apps	(Gls)
2020–2024	Sigma Olomouc B	87	(22)
2021–	Sigma Olomouc	91	(7)

International career^{‡}
2017	Czech Republic U15	4	(1)
2017–2018	Czech Republic U16	15	(4)
2018–2020	Czech Republic U17	29	(6)
2021–	Czech Republic U19	9	(0)
2022–	Czech Republic U20	2	(0)
- * Club domestic league appearances and goals as of 27 May 2026 ‡ National team caps and goals as of 17:01, 26 September 2022 (UTC)

Jáchym Šíp (born 22 January 2003) is a Czech footballer who plays as a winger for Sigma Olomouc.

== Club career ==
Šíp joined Sigma Olomouc at the age of 10, after playing youth football for TJ Loukov and Bystřice pod Hostýnem.

On 6 April 2021, Šíp made his debut for Sigma Olomouc, coming on as an 82nd-minute substitute in a 0–0 draw against Slovácko.

== International career ==
Šíp has represented the Czech Republic at under-15, under-16 and under-17 level.

In September 2020, Šíp was handed a call-up for the Czech Republic senior team for a UEFA Nations League tie against Scotland after a new 24-man squad needed to be named following COVID-19 quarantine measures.
