= Malšovická aréna =

Football stadium in the Czech Republic

Malšovická Arena
- Pod lízátky
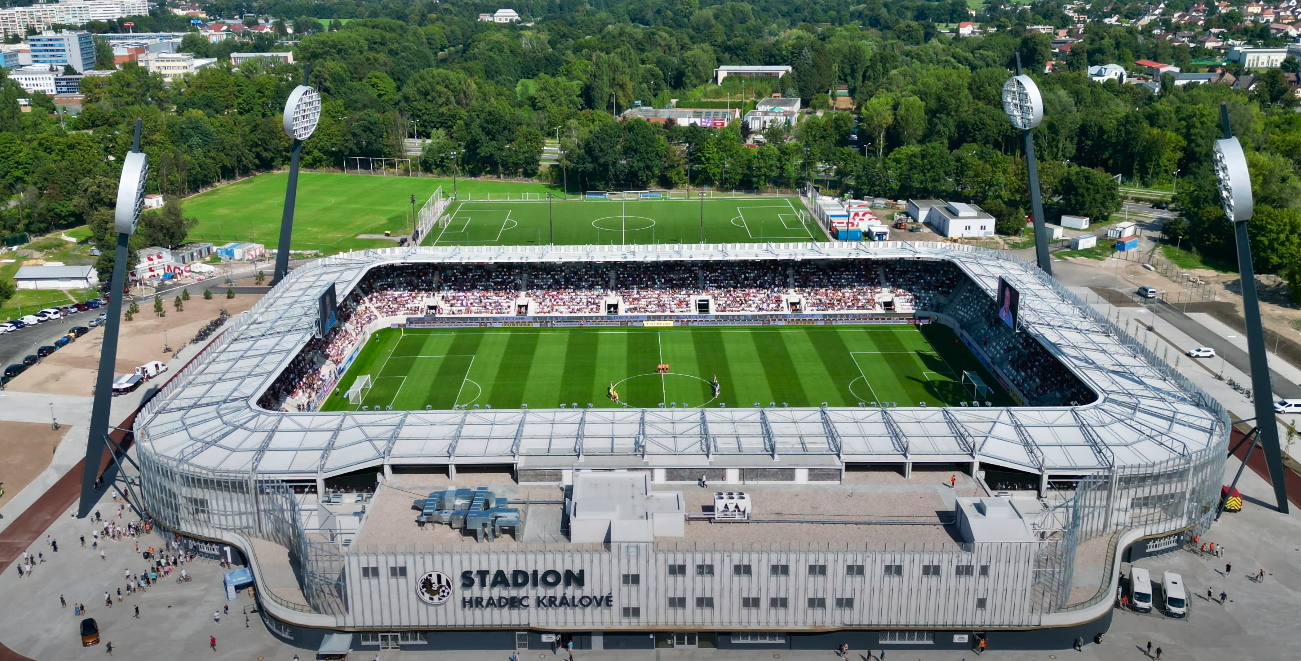
- UEFA
- Interactive map of Malšovická Arena
- Location: Úprkova 473/1, Hradec Králové, Czech Republic, 500 09
- Coordinates: 50°12′23″N 15°50′44″E
- Owner: Hradec Králové
- Operator: FC Hradec Králové
- Capacity: 9,300
- Surface: Grass
- Field size: 105x68 m

Construction
- Groundbreaking: August 2021
- Opened: 3 September 2023
- Cost: 763 million CZK
- Architect: Tomáš Vymetálek Architects

Tenants
- FC Hradec Králové (2023–present); Czech Republic national football team (2024–present)

Malšovická aréna is a football stadium, in Hradec Králové, Czech Republic. The stadium has a capacity of 9,300 people and is one of the most modern football stadiums in the Czech Republic. FC Hradec Králové, which plays in the Czech First League, uses the stadium for its home matches. With a capacity of 9,300 seats, the arena is one of the largest football stadiums in the Czech Republic.

== Background ==
The construction of a modern multifunctional stadium at place of former Všesportovní stadion in Malšovice part of Hradec Králové was approved in March 2021. Construction started in August of the same year. Its construction cost 763 million CZK.

The first match to take place at the stadium was the Czech First League match on 5 August 2023, with Hradec Králové hosting Dynamo České Budějovice. Home team won 5–1.

== International matches ==
Malšovická aréna has hosted two friendlies and one competitive match of the Czech Republic national football team.

10 June 2024 Friendly	Czech Republic	2–1	North Macedonia	Hradec Králové, Czech Republic
18:00 UTC+2	Schick 60' (pen.); Barák 90+8' (pen.)	Report	Alimi 65'	Stadium: Malšovická aréna Attendance: 8,864; Referee: Michal Očenáš (Slovakia)

22 March 2025 2026 FIFA World Cup qualification	Czech Republic	2–1	Faroe Islands	Hradec Králové, Czech Republic
20:45 UTC+1	Schick 25', 85'	Report	Vatnhamar 83'	Stadium: Malšovická aréna Attendance: 8,978; Referee: Rade Obrenovič (Slovenia)

8 September 2025 Friendly	Czech Republic	1–1	Saudi Arabia	Hradec Králové, Czech Republic
19:15 UTC+2	Chorý 21' (pen.)	Report	Al-Hamdan 90+1'	Stadium: Malšovická aréna Referee: Martin Dohál (Slovakia)
