= FK Jablonec =

Association football club in the Czech Republic

Jablonec
- Full name: Fotbalový Klub Jablonec, a.s.
- Founded: 1945; 81 years ago
- Ground: Stadion Střelnice
- Capacity: 5,690
- Chairman: Petr Flodrman
- Manager: Luboš Kozel
- League: Czech First League
- 2025–26: 5th of 16
- Website: www.fkjablonec.cz
Home colours	Away colours

FK Jablonec ([ˈjablonɛts]) is a Czech professional football club based in Jablonec nad Nisou. The club has played in the top league of Czech football, Czech First League, since 1994.

== History ==
Jablonec played its first season of top league football in the 1974–75 Czechoslovak First League, remaining in the top league for two seasons before relegation in 1976. The club won the 1993–94 Czech 2. Liga and returned to the top league, now of the Czech Republic, in 1994. Jablonec finished third in the 1996–97 Czech First League, at the time its best-ever finish. As a result, the club qualified for European competition in the form of the 1997–98 UEFA Cup, winning two and drawing two matches. The same season, the club won the Czech Cup, thus ensuring another season of European football, this time in the 1998–99 UEFA Cup Winners' Cup. The club reached the final of the 2006–07 Czech Cup, winning the right to play in European competition once more as opponents in the final and winners Sparta Prague qualified for the Champions League that season. As a result, the club played in the second qualifying round of the 2007–08 UEFA Cup.

The club finished a best-ever second place in the 2009–10 Czech First League, just a point behind league champions Sparta Prague and qualified for the 2010–11 UEFA Europa League. 2010–11 saw Jablonec striker David Lafata finish as the league's top scorer with 19 goals, helping the team to a third-place finish and qualification for another season of European football. In 2011–12, Lafata set a new scoring record in the Czech First League as he scored an unprecedented 25 goals in a single season again being the league's top scorer, although the club finished eighth. Lafata would go on to score 13 goals in 16 league appearances for Jablonec in the first half of the 2012–13 season before signing for Sparta Prague.

== Historical names ==
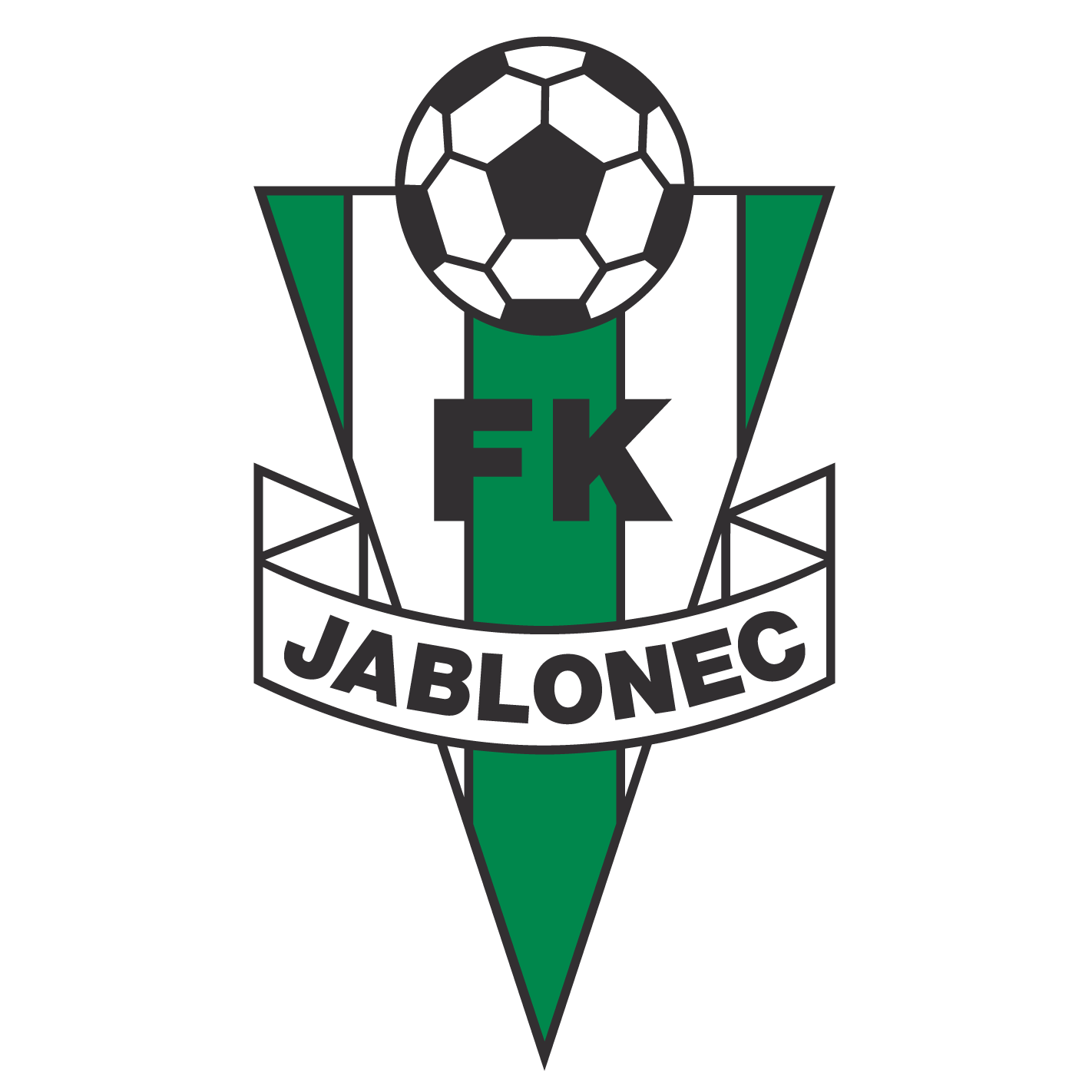
Club logo until 2026

- 1945 — ČSK Jablonec nad Nisou (Český sportovní klub Jablonec nad Nisou)
- 1948 — SK Jablonec nad Nisou (Sportovní klub Jablonec nad Nisou)
- 1955 — Sokol Preciosa Jablonec nad Nisou
- 1960 — TJ Jiskra Jablonec nad Nisou (Tělovýchovná jednota Jiskra Jablonec nad Nisou)
- 1963 — TJ LIAZ Jablonec nad Nisou (Tělovýchovná jednota Liberecké automobilové závody Jablonec nad Nisou)
- 1993 — TJ Sklobižu Jablonec nad Nisou (Tělovýchovná jednota Sklobižu Jablonec nad Nisou)
- 1994 — FK Jablonec nad Nisou (Fotbalový klub Jablonec nad Nisou, a.s.)
- 1998 — FK Jablonec 97 (Fotbalový klub Jablonec 97, a.s.)
- 2008 — FK Baumit Jablonec (Fotbalový klub BAUMIT Jablonec, a.s.)
- 2015 — FK Jablonec (Fotbalový klub Jablonec, a.s.)

== Players ==
=== Current squad ===
As of 4 September 2026.

Note: Flags indicate national team as defined under FIFA eligibility rules; some limited exceptions apply. Players may hold more than one non-FIFA nationality.

No.	Pos.	Nation	Player
1	GK	CZE	Jan Hanuš
4	DF	SRB	Nemanja Tekijaški
6	MF	NGR	Nelson Okeke
7	MF	GEO	Vakhtang Chanturishvili
8	MF	CZE	Filip Zorvan
9	FW	CZE	Antonín Růsek
10	MF	CZE	Jan Suchan
11	FW	CMR	Kevin-Prince Milla (on loan from Sparta Prague)
12	DF	CZE	David Nykrín
13	MF	CZE	Richard Sedláček
14	DF	CZE	Daniel Souček
15	DF	SRB	Dušan Pavlović
16	MF	SWE	Hugo Ahl
17	MF	CMR	Saidou Alioum
18	DF	CZE	Martin Cedidla

No.	Pos.	Nation	Player
19	FW	CZE	Jan Chramosta
20	DF	CZE	Jiří Sláma
21	MF	CZE	Matěj Polidar
22	MF	CZE	Roman Horák
23	DF	UKR	Eduard Sobol
24	MF	SVK	Dominik Hollý (on loan from Sparta Prague)
25	MF	SVK	Sebastian Nebyla
26	DF	CZE	Kryštof Karban
27	FW	CZE	Filip Vecheta (on loan from Pardubice)
33	GK	SVK	Michal Kukučka (on loan from Nürnberg)
36	MF	AUS	Garang Kuol (on loan from Sparta Prague)
44	FW	GAM	Lamin Jawo
57	DF	CZE	Filip Novák
90	DF	BFA	Nassim Innocenti
99	GK	SLO	Klemen Mihelak

=== Out on loan ===
Note: Flags indicate national team as defined under FIFA eligibility rules; some limited exceptions apply. Players may hold more than one non-FIFA nationality.

No.	Pos.	Nation	Player
—	MF	UKR	Samuel Obinaya (at Bohemians 1905)
—	MF	SVK	Samuel Lavrinčík (at Ružomberok)

No.	Pos.	Nation	Player
—	FW	SLO	Matej Malenšek (at Bravo)
—	GK	CZE	Albert Kotlín (at Kladno)

== Player records in the Czech First League ==
As of 18 September 2026.

Highlighted players are in the current squad.

=== Most appearances ===
#	Name	Matches
1	(Czech Republic) Tomáš Hübschman	285
2	(Czech Republic) Michal Špit	262
3	(Czech Republic) Luboš Loučka	239
4	(Czech Republic) Martin Doležal	225
5	(Czech Republic) Jozef Weber	208
6	(Slovakia) Jakub Považanec	200
7	(Czech Republic) Jan Chramosta	191
8	(Czech Republic) Jan Hanuš	190
9	(Czech Republic) Tomáš Michálek	182
10	(Czech Republic) Vojtěch Kubista	181

=== Most goals ===
#	Name	Goals
1	(Czech Republic) David Lafata	88
2	(Czech Republic) Martin Doležal	69
3	(Czech Republic) Jan Chramosta	56
4	(Czech Republic) Tomáš Michálek	34
5	(Czech Republic) Radim Holub	30
6	(Czech Republic) Radovan Hromádko	27
7	(Czech Republic) Jan Kopic	23
8	(Czech Republic) Karel Piták	22
9	(Czech Republic) Jaromír Navrátil	21
10	(Czech Republic) Tomáš Čížek	20

=== Most clean sheets ===
#	Name	Clean sheets
1	(Czech Republic) Michal Špit	84
2	(Czech Republic) Vlastimil Hrubý	57
3	(Czech Republic) Jan Hanuš	54
4	(Czech Republic) Zdeněk Jánoš	53

== Managers ==
- Jiří Kotrba (1993)
- Josef Pešice (1993–95)
- Jiří Kotrba (1995–98)
- Jaroslav Dočkal (1998)
- Július Bielik (1999)
- Zdeněk Klucký (1999–2000)
- Jindřich Dejmal (2000)
- Jaroslav Hřebík (2000–01)
- Vlastimil Palička (2001–03)
- Petr Rada (Oct 2003 – June 2007)
- Luboš Kozel (2007)
- František Komňacký (Oct 2007 – June 2012)
- Václav Kotal (July 2012 – May 2013)
- Roman Skuhravý (May 2013 – May 2014)
- Jaroslav Šilhavý (June 2014 – Dec 2015)
- Zdenko Frťala (Dec 2015 – Oct 2016)
- Zdeněk Klucký (Oct 2016 – Dec 2017)
- Petr Rada (Dec 2017 – April 2022)
- Jiří Vágner (April 2022 – May 2022)
- David Horejš (May 2022 – May 2023)
- Radoslav Látal (June 2023 – June 2024)
- Luboš Kozel (June 2024 –present)

== History in domestic competitions ==
- 1993–1994 Czech 2. Liga
- 1994– Czech First League

- Seasons spent at Level 1 of the football league system: 31
- Seasons spent at Level 2 of the football league system: 1
- Seasons spent at Level 3 of the football league system: 0
- Seasons spent at Level 4 of the football league system: 0

=== Czech Republic ===
Season	League	Placed	Pld	W	D	L	GF	GA	GD	Pts	Cup
1993–94	2. liga	1st	30	22	7	1	62	17	+45	51	Round of 32
1994–95	1. liga	10th	30	11	6	13	37	33	+4	39	Round of 64
1995–96	1. liga	3rd	30	16	5	9	45	26	+19	53	Semi-finals
1996–97	1. liga	3rd	30	17	5	8	40	29	+11	56	Quarter-finals
1997–98	1. liga	6th	30	12	10	8	47	33	+14	46	Winners
1998–99	1. liga	12th	30	9	8	13	37	46	–9	35	Round of 16
1999–00	1. liga	14th	30	7	11	12	24	36	–12	32	Quarter-finals
2000–01	1. liga	12th	30	8	8	14	26	40	–14	32	Quarter-finals
2001–02	1. liga	9th	30	10	10	10	35	33	+2	40	Round of 32
2002–03	1. liga	12th	30	7	13	10	29	39	–10	34	Runners-up
2003–04	1. liga	10th	30	8	14	8	27	32	–5	38	Round of 16
2004–05	1. liga	6th	30	12	9	9	33	27	+6	45	Quarter-finals
2005–06	1. liga	8th	30	10	7	13	35	39	–4	37	Round of 64
2006–07	1. liga	9th	30	9	11	10	31	32	–1	38	Runners-up
2007–08	1. liga	12th	30	8	9	13	24	32	–8	33	Quarter-finals
2008–09	1. liga	5th	30	14	4	12	43	37	+6	46	Round of 16
2009–10	1. liga	2nd	30	18	7	5	42	24	+18	61	Runners-up
2010–11	1. liga	3rd	30	17	7	6	65	34	+31	58	Quarter-finals
2011–12	1. liga	8th	30	11	7	12	54	43	+11	40	Semi-finals
2012–13	1. liga	4th	30	13	10	7	49	41	+8	49	Winners
2013–14	1. liga	11th	30	9	7	14	43	53	–10	34	Semi-finals
2014–15	1. liga	3rd	30	19	7	4	58	22	+36	64	Runners-up
2015–16	1. liga	7th	30	10	11	9	46	39	+7	41	Runners-up
2016–17	1. liga	8th	30	9	12	9	43	38	+5	39	Round of 32
2017–18	1. liga	3rd	30	16	8	6	49	27	+22	56	Runners-up
2018–19	1. liga	4th	35	17	6	12	58	32	+26	57	Round of 16
2019–20	1. liga	4th	35	14	9	12	48	52	–4	51	Quarter-finals
2020–21	1. liga	3rd	34	21	6	7	59	33	+26	69	Quarter-finals
2021–22	1. liga	13th	35	6	16	13	27	48	–21	34	Semi-finals
2022–23	1. liga	13th	35	10	10	15	49	63	–14	40	Round of 32
2023–24	1. liga	11th	35	9	14	12	45	50	–5	41	Quarter-finals
2024–25	1. liga	5th	35	19	6	10	60	33	+27	63	Quarter-finals
2025–26	1. liga	5th	35	16	7	12	45	47	–2	55	Runners-up
2026–27	1. liga										Round of 16

== History in European competitions ==
Season	Competition	Round	Club	Home	Away	Aggregate
1997–98	UEFA Cup	1Q	(Azerbaijan) Qarabağ FK	5–0	3–0	8–0
1997–98	UEFA Cup	2Q	(Sweden) Örebro SK	1–1	0–0	1–1 (a)
1998–99	UEFA Cup Winners' Cup	1R	(Cyprus) Apollon Limassol	2–1	1–2	3–3 (3–4 p)
2007–08	UEFA Cup	2Q	Austria Wien	1–1	3–4	4–5
2010–11	UEFA Europa League	3Q	(Cyprus) APOEL	1–3	0–1	1–4
2011–12	UEFA Europa League	2Q	(Albania) Flamurtari	5–1	2–0	7–1
2011–12	UEFA Europa League	3Q	(Netherlands) AZ	1–1	0–2	1–3
2013–14	UEFA Europa League	3Q	(Norway) Strømsgodset	2–1	3–1	5–2
2013–14	UEFA Europa League	PO	(Spain) Real Betis	1–2	0–6	1–8
2015–16	UEFA Europa League	3Q	(Denmark) Copenhagen	0–1	3–2	3–3 (a)
2015–16	UEFA Europa League	PO	(Netherlands) Ajax	0–0	0–1	0–1
2018–19	UEFA Europa League	GS	(France) Rennes	0–1	1–2	4th place
2018–19	UEFA Europa League	GS	(Ukraine) Dynamo Kyiv	2–2	1–0	4th place
2018–19	UEFA Europa League	GS	(Kazakhstan) Astana	1–1	1–2	4th place
2019–20	UEFA Europa League	2Q	(Armenia) Pyunik	0–0	1–2	1–2
2020–21	UEFA Europa League	2Q	(Slovakia) DAC Dunajská Streda	—N/a	3–5 (a.e.t.)	—N/a
2021–22	UEFA Europa League	3Q	(Scotland) Celtic	2–4	0–3	2–7
2021–22	UEFA Europa Conference League	PO	(Slovakia) Žilina	5–1	3–0	8–1
2021–22	UEFA Europa Conference League	GS	(Netherlands) AZ	1–1	0–1	3rd place
2021–22	UEFA Europa Conference League	GS	(Romania) CFR Cluj	1–0	0–2	3rd place
2021–22	UEFA Europa Conference League	GS	(Denmark) Randers	2–2	2–2	3rd place
2026–27	UEFA Conference League	2Q	(Croatia) Varaždin	2–0	2–3	4–3
2026–27	UEFA Conference League	3Q	(Latvia) RFS	2–0	2–1	4–1
2026–27	UEFA Conference League	PO	(Scotland) Rangers	1-0	0–1	1–1 (4–3 p)

== Honours ==
- Czech 2. Liga
  - Winners (1): 1993–94
- Czech Cup
  - Winners (2): 1997–98, 2012–13
- Czech Supercup
  - Winners (1): 2013

== Club records ==
=== Czech First League records ===
- Best position: 2nd (2009–10)
- Worst position: 14th (1999–2000)
- Biggest home win: Jablonec 8–0 České Budějovice (1997–98)
- Biggest away win: Příbram 0–6 Jablonec (2018–19)
- Biggest home defeat: Jablonec 0–5 Slavia (2026–27)
- Biggest away defeat: Sparta 6–0 Jablonec (1996–97)
