= 2021–22 1. FC Slovácko season =

Slovácko
2021–22 season
- Chairman: Petr Pojezný
- Manager: Martin Svědík
- Stadium: Městský fotbalový stadion Miroslava Valenty
- Czech First League: 4th
- Czech Cup: Winners
- UEFA Europa Conference League: Second qualifying round
Home colours	Away colours	Third colours

The 2021–22 season was the 77th season in the existence of 1. FC Slovácko and the club's 28th consecutive season in the top flight of Czech football. In addition to the domestic league, Slovácko participated in this season's edition of the Czech Cup and UEFA Europa Conference League.

== Players ==
=== First-team squad ===
As of 5 July 2021

Note: Flags indicate national team as defined under FIFA eligibility rules; some limited exceptions apply. Players may hold more than one non-FIFA nationality.

No.	Pos.	Nation	Player
1	GK	CZE	Filip Nguyen (on loan from Slovan Liberec)
3	DF	CZE	Michal Kadlec
4	DF	CZE	Jaromír Srubek
6	DF	CZE	Stanislav Hofmann
8	MF	CZE	Daniel Mareček
10	MF	CZE	Jan Navrátil
11	MF	CZE	Milan Petržela
13	MF	CZE	Michal Kohút
14	DF	CZE	Josef Divíšek
15	MF	CZE	Václav Jurečka
16	DF	SVK	Patrik Šimko
18	MF	CZE	Lukáš Sadílek

No.	Pos.	Nation	Player
19	MF	CZE	Jan Kalabiška
20	MF	CZE	Marek Havlík
21	FW	CZE	Ondřej Šašinka (on loan from Baník Ostrava)
22	FW	CUW	Rigino Cicilia
23	DF	CZE	Petr Reinberk
25	GK	CZE	Vít Nemrava
27	DF	SVK	Michal Tomič
28	MF	CZE	Vlastimil Daníček
91	GK	SVK	Pavol Bajza
—	GK	CZE	Jiří Borek
—	MF	CZE	Daniel Holzer
—	DF	MNE	Marko Merdović

== Pre-season and friendlies ==
Win Draw Loss Fixtures

== Competitions ==
=== Overall record ===
Competition	First match	Last match	Starting round	Final position	Record							
Competition	First match	Last match	Starting round	Final position	Pld	W	D	L	GF	GA	GD	Win %
Czech First League	25 July 2021	15 May 2022	Matchday 1	4th	35	21	5	9	59	38	+21	60.00
Czech Cup	22 September 2021	18 May 2022	Third round	Winners	5	4	1	0	9	3	+6	80.00
UEFA Europa Conference League	22 July 2021	29 July 2021	Second qualifying round	Second qualifying round	2	1	0	1	1	1	+0	50.00
Total					42	26	6	10	69	42	+27	61.90

Source: Soccerway

=== Czech First League ===
==== League table ====
Pos	Team	Pld	W	D	L	GF	GA	GD	Pts	Qualification or relegation
2	Viktoria Plzeň	30	22	6	2	53	19	+34	72	Qualification for the championship group
3	Sparta Prague	30	20	6	4	65	32	+33	66	Qualification for the championship group
4	Slovácko	30	18	5	7	50	30	+20	59	Qualification for the championship group
5	Baník Ostrava	30	14	9	7	54	39	+15	51	Qualification for the championship group
6	Hradec Králové	30	9	13	8	38	40	−2	40	Qualification for the championship group

Source: Fortuna Liga
Rules for classification: 1) Points; 2) Head-to-head points; 3) Head-to-head goal difference; 4) Head-to-head goals scored; 5) Goal difference; 6) Goals scored; 7) Fair-play ranking; 8) Draw.

Pos	Team	Pld	W	D	L	GF	GA	GD	Pts	Qualification or relegation	PLZ	SLA	SPA	SLO	OST	HKR
1	Viktoria Plzeň (C)	35	26	7	2	63	21	+42	85	Qualification for the Champions League second qualifying round	—	—	3–0	3–1	1–0	—
2	Slavia Prague	35	24	6	5	80	27	+53	78	Qualification for the Europa Conference League second qualifying round	1–1	—	1–2	3–0	—	—
3	Sparta Prague	35	22	7	6	72	40	+32	73	Qualification for the Europa Conference League second qualifying round	—	—	—	1–2	3–1	1–1
4	Slovácko	35	21	5	9	59	38	+21	68	Qualification to Europa League third qualifying round (Note: Slovácko qualified for the Europa League as Czech Cup winners.)	—	—	—	—	3–1	3–0
5	Baník Ostrava	35	15	10	10	60	48	+12	55		—	1–1	—	—	—	3–1
6	Hradec Králové	35	10	14	11	44	52	−8	44		0–2	4–3	—	—	—	—

Source: Fortuna Liga
Legend: Blue = home team win; Yellow = draw; Red = away team win.
Rules for classification: 1) Total points; 2) Points earned in regular season; 3) Head-to-head points (regular season); 4) Head-to-head goal difference (regular season); 5) Head-to-head goals scored (regular season); 5) Goal difference (all matches); 6) Goals scored (all matches); 7) Fair-play ranking; 8) Draw.
(C) Champions

==== Results summary ====
Overall								Home						Away					
Pld	W	D	L	GF	GA	GD	Pts	W	D	L	GF	GA	GD	W	D	L	GF	GA	GD
35	21	5	9	59	38	+21	68	14	1	2	32	10	+22	7	4	7	27	28	−1

Source: Fortuna Liga

==== Matches ====
25 July 2021 1	Slovan Liberec	0–1	Slovácko	Liberec
16:00 CEST (UTC+2)		Report	Petržela 31'	Stadium: Stadion u Nisy; Attendance: 2,499; Referee: Jan Machálek

1 August 2021 2	Slovácko	1–0	České Budějovice	Uherské Hradiště
16:00 CEST (UTC+2)	Kohút 60'	Report		Stadium: Městský fotbalový stadion Miroslava Valenty; Attendance: 2,953; Referee: Jan Petřík

8 August 2021 3	Viktoria Plzeň	2–1	Slovácko	Plzeň
19:00 CEST (UTC+2)	Beauguel 67'; Mosquera 83'	Report	Jurečka 23'	Stadium: Doosan Arena; Attendance: 6,118; Referee: Pavel Julínek

15 August 2021 4	Slovácko	1–0	Hradec Králové	Uherské Hradiště
16:00 CEST (UTC+2)	Mareček 51'	Report		Stadium: Městský fotbalový stadion Miroslava Valenty; Attendance: 3,657; Referee: Tomáš Batík

22 August 2021 5	Jablonec	1–1	Slovácko	Jablonec nad Nisou
16:00 CEST (UTC+2)	Čvančara 76' (pen.)	Report	Jurečka 45'	Stadium: Stadion Střelnice; Attendance: 2,487; Referee: Jan Petřík

28 August 2021 6	Slovácko	2–1	Pardubice	Uherské Hradiště
16:00 CEST (UTC+2)	Daníček 3'; Petržela 14'	Report	Cadu 62'	Stadium: Městský fotbalový stadion Miroslava Valenty; Attendance: 3,616; Referee: Jan Machálek

12 September 2021 7	Slavia Prague	2–1	Slovácko	Prague
19:00 CEST (UTC+2)	Samek 4'; Tecl 68'	Report	Vecheta 90'	Stadium: Sinobo Stadium; Attendance: 11,252; Referee: Pavel Orel

18 September 2021 8	Slovácko	3–0	Fastav Zlín	Uherské Hradiště
16:00 CEST (UTC+2)	Havlík 49'; Hofmann 56'; Holzer 62'	Report		Stadium: Městský fotbalový stadion Miroslava Valenty; Attendance: 4,926; Referee: Ondrej Pechanec

26 September 2021 9	Mladá Boleslav	3–5	Slovácko	Mladá Boleslav
16:00 CEST (UTC+2)	Ewerton 45+2', 73', 87'	Report	Kohút 17'; Jurečka 23', 57'; Kalabiška 26'; Petržela 61'	Stadium: Lokotrans Aréna; Attendance: 2,223; Referee: Pavel Julínek

2 October 2021 10	Slovácko	3–2	Teplice	Uherské Hradiště
16:00 CEST (UTC+2)	Reinberk 40', 61'; Jurečka 52'	Report	Rezek 15'; Kodad 73'	Stadium: Městský fotbalový stadion Miroslava Valenty; Attendance: 3,520; Referee: Karel Hrubeš

16 October 2021 11	Baník Ostrava	1–2	Slovácko	Ostrava
16:00 CEST (UTC+2)	Tetour 32' (pen.)	Report	Jurečka 5'; Sadílek 75'	Stadium: Městský stadion Attendance: 7,713; Referee: Ondřej Ginzel

23 October 2021 12	Slovácko	1–0	Bohemians 1905	Uherské Hradiště
16:00 CEST (UTC+2)	Cicilia 90+3'	Report		Stadium: Městský fotbalový stadion Miroslava Valenty; Attendance: 4,203; Referee: Dalibor Černý

30 October 2021 13	Sigma Olomouc	0–3	Slovácko	Olomouc
18:00 CEST (UTC+2)		Report	Reinberk 71'; Cicilia 80'; Holzer 90+3'	Stadium: Andrův stadion Attendance: 3,047; Referee: Jan Petřík

7 November 2021 14	Karviná	2–2	Slovácko	Karviná
15:00 CET (UTC+1)	Papadopulos 11'; Túlio 81'	Report	Hofmann 37'; Kalabiška 56'	Stadium: Městský stadion Attendance: 1,820; Referee: Ladislav Szikszay

21 November 2021 15	Slovácko	4–0	Sparta Prague	Uherské Hradiště
15:00 CET (UTC+1)	Kalabiška 16'; Jurečka 43'; Holzer 57'; Cicilia 85'	Report		Stadium: Městský fotbalový stadion Miroslava Valenty; Attendance: 7,701; Referee: Pavel Franěk

27 November 2021 16	České Budějovice	3–2	Slovácko	České Budějovice
15:00 CET (UTC+1)	Valenta 72'; Bassey 82', 85'	Report	Kalabiška 19'; Sadílek 52'	Stadium: Stadion Střelecký ostrov Attendance: 822; Referee: Ondřej Ginzel

5 December 2021 17	Slovácko	1–2	Viktoria Plzeň	Uherské Hradiště
18:00 CET (UTC+1)	Šašinka 90+3'	Report	Havel 1'; Beauguel 68'	Stadium: Městský fotbalový stadion Miroslava Valenty; Attendance: 991; Referee: Ondřej Pechanec

11 December 2021 18	Hradec Králové	2–2	Slovácko	Mladá Boleslav (Note: Hradec Králové played their home matches in Mladá Boleslav due to the rebuilding of their own Všesportovní stadion.)
15:00 CET (UTC+1)	Vlkanova 63'; Rada 81' (pen.)	Report	Jurečka 36', 83'	Stadium: Lokotrans Aréna; Attendance: 390; Referee: Pavel Franěk

18 December 2021 19	Slovácko	2–1	Jablonec	Uherské Hradiště
19:00 CET (UTC+1)	Jurečka 10'; Petržela 56'	Report	Hübschman 39'	Stadium: Městský fotbalový stadion Miroslava Valenty; Attendance: 997; Referee: Ondřej Berka

13 February 2022 21	Slovácko	0–1	Slavia Prague	Uherské Hradiště
15:00 CET (UTC+1)		Report	Lingr 44'	Stadium: Městský fotbalový stadion Miroslava Valenty; Attendance: 1,000; Referee: Dalibor Černý

19 February 2022 22	Fastav Zlín	1–0	Slovácko	Zlín
15:00 CET (UTC+1)	Fryšták 82' (o.g.)	Report		Stadium: Letná Stadion; Attendance: 3,421; Referee: Ondřej Berka

22 February 2022 20	Pardubice	0–0	Slovácko	Prague (Note: Pardubice continued playing their home matches in Ďolíček due to the rebuilding of their own stadium Pod Vinicí.)
17:00 CET (UTC+1)		Report		Stadium: Ďolíček; Attendance: 528; Referee: Tomáš Klíma
Note: The match was originally scheduled for 6 February 2022, but was postponed due to the isolation and quarantine measures imposed on the Pardubice team.

26 February 2022 23	Slovácko	2–1	Mladá Boleslav	Uherské Hradiště
15:00 CET (UTC+1)	Jurečka 61', 90+5' (pen.)	Report	Douděra 17'	Stadium: Městský fotbalový stadion Miroslava Valenty; Attendance: 3,791; Referee: Miroslav Zelinka

6 March 2022 24	Teplice	0–1	Slovácko	Teplice
15:00 CET (UTC+1)		Report	Cicilia 55'	Stadium: Na Stínadlech; Attendance: 2,188; Referee: Ladislav Szikszay

12 March 2022 25	Slovácko	0–0	Baník Ostrava	Uherské Hradiště
15:00 CET (UTC+1)		Report		Stadium: Městský fotbalový stadion Miroslava Valenty; Attendance: 7,117; Referee: Tomáš Klíma

19 March 2022 26	Bohemians 1905	1–2	Slovácko	Prague
15:00 CET (UTC+1)	Puškáč 9' (pen.)	Report	Šašinka 33'; Sadílek 64'	Stadium: Ďolíček; Attendance: 3,988; Referee: Josef Krejsa

2 April 2022 27	Slovácko	1–0	Sigma Olomouc	Uherské Hradiště
16:00 CEST (UTC+2)	Havlík 65'	Report		Stadium: Městský fotbalový stadion Miroslava Valenty; Attendance: 3,649; Referee: Jan Petřík

9 April 2022 28	Slovácko	3–1	Karviná	Uherské Hradiště
16:00 CEST (UTC+2)	Túlio 2' (o.g.); Cicilia 49'; Hofmann 61'	Report	Sinyavskiy 78'	Stadium: Městský fotbalový stadion Miroslava Valenty; Attendance: 3,095; Referee: Tomáš Klíma

17 April 2022 29	Sparta Prague	3–1	Slovácko	Prague
17:00 CEST (UTC+2)	Hancko 33'; Dočkal 44'; Hložek 73'	Report	Holzer 42'	Stadium: Generali Arena; Attendance: 14,235; Referee: Ladislav Szikszay

20 April 2022 30	Slovácko	2–0	Slovan Liberec	Uherské Hradiště
18:00 CEST (UTC+2)	Jurečka 40' (pen.), 62' (pen.)	Report		Stadium: Městský fotbalový stadion Miroslava Valenty; Attendance: 3,068; Referee: Michal Křepský

==== Championship group ====
30 April 2022 32	Slovácko	3–1	Baník Ostrava	Uherské Hradiště
16:00 CEST (UTC+2)	Jurečka 55' (pen.), 69', 90+5'	Report	Klíma 6'	Stadium: Městský fotbalový stadion Miroslava Valenty; Attendance: 4,727; Referee: Marek Radina

8 May 2022 33	Slavia Prague	3–0	Slovácko	Prague
19:00 CEST (UTC+2)	Plavšić 29'; Traoré 75', (yellow card) 81'; Lingr 84', (yellow card) 85'	Report		Stadium: Sinobo Stadium; Attendance: 13,119; Referee: Miroslav Zelinka

11 May 2022 34	Sparta Prague	1–2	Slovácko	Prague
19:00 CEST (UTC+2)	Hancko 31' (pen.)	Report	Holzer 54'; Havlík 81'	Stadium: Generali Arena; Attendance: 7,093; Referee: Michal Křepský

=== Czech Cup ===
22 September 2021 Third round	Zbuzany	1–2	Slovácko	Zbuzany
15:30 CEST (UTC+2)	J. Jonáš 65'	Report	Kohút 1'; Jurečka 43'	Stadium: Stadion FK Zbuzany; Referee: Ondřej Ginzel

12 November 2021 Fourth round	Slovácko	3–1 (a.e.t.)	Karviná	Uherské Hradiště
17:00 CET (UTC+1)	Jurečka 90+3'; Cicilia 105', 108' (pen.)	Report	Šindelář 24'	Stadium: Městský fotbalový stadion Miroslava Valenty; Referee: Dalibor Černý

9 February 2022 Quarter-finals	Sigma Olomouc	0–0 (a.e.t.) (2–4 p)	Slovácko	Olomouc
14:30 CET (UTC+1)		Report		Stadium: Andrův stadion Referee: Dalibor Černý
Note: Slovácko won on penalty kicks 4–2.

25 March 2022 Semi-finals	Hradec Králové	0–1	Slovácko	Mladá Boleslav
17:00 CET (UTC+1)		Report	Šašinka 36'	Stadium: Lokotrans Aréna; Referee: Ladislav Szikszay

18 May 2022 Final	Slovácko	3–1	Sparta Prague	Uherské Hradiště
17:00 CEST (UTC+2)	Jurečka 11' (pen.); Reinberk 33', 43'; Petržela (yellow card) 47'	Report	Suchomel (yellow card) 10'; Hancko 42'; Čvančara (yellow card) 65'; Dočkal (yellow card) 80'	Stadium: Městský fotbalový stadion Miroslava Valenty; Attendance: 7,991; Referee: Ladislav Szikszay

=== UEFA Europa Conference League ===
==== Second qualifying round ====
22 July 2021 First leg	Lokomotiv Plovdiv (Bulgaria)	1–0	(Czech Republic) Slovácko	Plovdiv, Bulgaria
20:00 EEST (UTC+3)	Vitanov 89'	Report		Stadium: Stadion Lokomotiv; Attendance: 3,250; Referee: Karim Abed (France)

29 July 2021 Second leg	Slovácko (Czech Republic)	1–0 (a.e.t.) (1–1 agg.) (2–3 p)	(Bulgaria) Lokomotiv Plovdiv	Uherské Hradiště, Czech Republic
19:00 CEST (UTC+2)	Daníček 26'	Report		Stadium: Městský fotbalový stadion Miroslava Valenty; Attendance: 4,208; Referee: Andrew Madley (England)
	Penalties
	Daníček (penalty missed); Holzer (penalty missed); Kohút (penalty missed); Jurečka (penalty scored); Kadlec (penalty scored)		(penalty scored) Iliev; (penalty missed) Salinas; (penalty scored) Ruane; (penalty missed) Yanchev; (penalty scored) Karagaren
Note: 1–1 on aggregate. Lokomotiv Plovdiv won 3–2 on penalties.
