= 2023–24 1. FC Slovácko season =

1. FC Slovácko
2023–24 season
- Manager: Martin Svědík
- Stadium: Městský fotbalový stadion
- Czech First League: 6th
- Czech Cup: Third round
- Top goalscorer: League: Marek Havlík (12); All: Marek Havlík (12)
- Average home league attendance: 5,103
- Biggest win: Unie Hlubina 0–8 Slovácko

The 2023–24 season was 1. FC Slovácko's 97th season in existence and 15th consecutive in the Czech First League. They also competed in the Czech Cup.

== Players ==
=== First-team squad ===
As of 20 December 2023

Note: Flags indicate national team as defined under FIFA eligibility rules; some limited exceptions apply. Players may hold more than one non-FIFA nationality.

| No. | Pos. | Nation | Player |
|---|---|---|---|
| 2 | DF | NGR | Abuchi Onuoha |
| 3 | DF | CZE | Michal Kadlec |
| 4 | DF | CZE | Jaromír Srubek |
| 5 | DF | CZE | Tomáš Břečka |
| 6 | DF | CZE | Stanislav Hofmann |
| 7 | MF | CZE | Daniel Holzer |
| 8 | MF | CZE | Aleš Kočí |
| 9 | FW | CZE | Filip Vecheta |
| 10 | MF | CZE | Michal Trávník |
| 11 | MF | CZE | Milan Petržela |
| 13 | MF | CZE | Michal Kohút |
| 14 | MF | IRQ | Merchas Doski |
| 17 | FW | CZE | Ondřej Mihálik |

| No. | Pos. | Nation | Player |
|---|---|---|---|
| 18 | MF | KOR | Seung-bin Kim |
| 19 | DF | CZE | Jan Kalabiška |
| 20 | MF | CZE | Marek Havlík |
| 21 | MF | CZE | Matěj Valenta (on loan from Slavia Prague) |
| 22 | FW | CUW | Rigino Cicilia |
| 23 | DF | CZE | Petr Reinberk |
| 24 | MF | CZE | Pavel Juroška |
| 28 | MF | CZE | Vlastimil Daníček |
| 29 | GK | CZE | Milan Heča |
| 30 | GK | CZE | Tomáš Fryšták |
| 31 | GK | CZE | Alexandr Urban |
| 99 | MF | EST | Vlasiy Sinyavskiy |
| — | FW | AUT | Marko Kvasina |

=== Out on loan ===
Note: Flags indicate national team as defined under FIFA eligibility rules; some limited exceptions apply. Players may hold more than one non-FIFA nationality.

| No. | Pos. | Nation | Player |
|---|---|---|---|
| — | GK | CZE | Jiří Borek (at Vyškov) |
| — | DF | MNE | Marko Merdović (at Radomlje) |

| No. | Pos. | Nation | Player |
|---|---|---|---|
| — | DF | CZE | Vojtěch Bartoš (at Prostějov) |
| — | MF | CZE | Martin Kudela (at Kroměříž) |

== Transfers ==
=== In ===
| Pos. | Player | Transferred from | Fee | Date | Source |

=== Out ===
| Pos. | Player | Transferred to | Fee | Date | Source |

== Pre-season and friendlies ==
Win Draw Loss

| 12 July 2023 Friendly | Holstein Kiel (Germany) | 1–0 | (Czech Republic) Slovácko | Jenbach, Austria |
| 16:00 CEST (UTC+2) | Pichler 18' | | | Stadium: Stadion Jenbach |

| 15 July 2023 Friendly | Red Bull Salzburg (Austria) | 0–3 | (Czech Republic) Slovácko | Eugendorf, Austria |
| 15:20 | | | | Stadium: Sportzentrum Eugendorf |

== Competitions ==
=== Overall record ===
| Competition | First match | Last match | Starting round | Final position | Record | | | | | | | |
| Competition | First match | Last match | Starting round | Final position | Pld | W | D | L | GF | GA | GD | Win % |
|---|---|---|---|---|---|---|---|---|---|---|---|---|
| Czech First League | 23 July 2023 | 27 April 2024 | Matchday 1 | 6th | 35 | 12 | 8 | 15 | 45 | 56 | −11 | 34.29 |
| Czech Cup | 30 August 2023 | 27 September 2023 | Second round | Third round | 2 | 1 | 0 | 1 | 11 | 4 | +7 | 50.00 |
| Total | | | | | 37 | 13 | 8 | 16 | 56 | 60 | −4 | 35.14 |

Source: Soccerway

=== Czech First League ===
==== Results summary ====
| Overall | | | | | | | | Home | | | | | | Away | | | | | |
| Pld | W | D | L | GF | GA | GD | Pts | W | D | L | GF | GA | GD | W | D | L | GF | GA | GD |
|---|---|---|---|---|---|---|---|---|---|---|---|---|---|---|---|---|---|---|---|
| 35 | 12 | 8 | 15 | 45 | 56 | −11 | 44 | 6 | 4 | 7 | 26 | 24 | +2 | 6 | 4 | 8 | 19 | 32 | −13 |

Source: Fortuna Liga

==== Regular season ====
===== League table =====
| Pos | Team | Pld | W | D | L | GF | GA | GD | Pts | Qualification or relegation |
|---|---|---|---|---|---|---|---|---|---|---|
| 4 | Baník Ostrava | 30 | 13 | 6 | 11 | 48 | 39 | +9 | 45 | Qualification for the Championship group |
| 5 | Mladá Boleslav | 30 | 12 | 8 | 10 | 50 | 46 | +4 | 44 | Qualification for the Championship group |
| 6 | Slovácko | 30 | 11 | 8 | 11 | 39 | 40 | −1 | 41 | Qualification for the Championship group |
| 7 | Slovan Liberec | 30 | 10 | 10 | 10 | 46 | 46 | 0 | 40 | Qualification for the Play-off |
| 8 | Sigma Olomouc | 30 | 10 | 7 | 13 | 40 | 45 | −5 | 37 | Qualification for the Play-off |

Source: Fortuna Liga
Rules for classification: 1) Points; 2) Head-to-head points; 3) Head-to-head goal difference; 4) Head-to-head goals scored; 5) Goal difference; 6) Goals scored; 7) Fair-play ranking; 8) Draw.

===== Results by round =====
| Round | 1 | 2 | 3 | 4 | 5 | 6 | 7 | 8 | 9 | 10 | 11 | 12 | 13 | 14 | 15 | 16 | 17 | 18 | 19 | 20 | 21 | 22 | 23 | 24 | 25 | 26 | 27 | 28 | 29 | 30 |
|---|---|---|---|---|---|---|---|---|---|---|---|---|---|---|---|---|---|---|---|---|---|---|---|---|---|---|---|---|---|---|
| Ground | H | A | H | A | H | A | H | A | H | A | H | A | H | H | A | H | A | H | A | H | A | H | A | H | A | H | A | A | H | A |
| Result | W | D | L | W | D | W | W | L | W | L | W | L | D | D | W | W | D | W | W | L | L | L | W | L | D | L | L | L | D | D |
| Position | 2 | 4 | 10 | 6 | 7 | 5 | 5 | 5 | 5 | 7 | 5 | 7 | 7 | 7 | 5 | 4 | 4 | 4 | 4 | 4 | 4 | 4 | 4 | 4 | 4 | 6 | 6 | 6 | 6 | 6 |

Source: Fortuna Liga
A = Away; H = Home; W = Win; D = Draw; L = Loss

==== Matches ====
The league fixtures were unveiled on 21 June 2023.

| 23 July 2023 1 | Slovácko | 4–1 | České Budějovice | Uherské Hradiště |
| 15:00 CEST (UTC+2) | Havlík 36'; Kim 39'; Valenta 76'; Mihálik 81' | Report | Hora 54' (pen.) | Stadium: Městský fotbalový stadion Miroslava Valenty; Attendance: 4,324; Referee: Dominik Starý |

| 29 July 2023 2 | Baník Ostrava | 0–0 | Slovácko | Ostrava |
| 18:00 CEST (UTC+2) | | Report | | Stadium: Městský stadion Attendance: 9,016; Referee: Tomáš Klíma |

| 5 August 2023 3 | Slovácko | 0–2 | Sigma Olomouc | Uherské Hradiště |
| 15:00 CEST (UTC+2) | | Report | Juliš 9'; Vodháněl 48' | Stadium: Městský fotbalový stadion Miroslava Valenty; Attendance: 4,942; Referee: Stanislav Volek |

| 13 August 2023 4 | Bohemians 1905 | 0–1 | Slovácko | Prague |
| 15:00 CEST (UTC+2) | | Report | Hofmann 45+3' | Stadium: Ďolíček; Attendance: 5,612; Referee: Ondřej Pechanec |

| 19 August 2023 5 | Slovácko | 2–2 | Mladá Boleslav | Uherské Hradiště |
| 15:00 CEST (UTC+2) | Vecheta 11'; Kalabiška 90+2' | Report | Mareček 45+2', 53' | Stadium: Městský fotbalový stadion Miroslava Valenty; Attendance: 3,992; Referee: Karel Rouček |

| 26 August 2023 6 | Pardubice | 0–1 | Slovácko | Pardubice |
| 15:00 CEST (UTC+2) | | Report | Kalabiška 21' | Stadium: CFIG Arena; Attendance: 3,014; Referee: Ladislav Szikszay |

| 2 September 2023 7 | Slovácko | 1–0 | Zlín | Uherské Hradiště |
| 15:00 CEST (UTC+2) | Havlík 74' | Report | | Stadium: Městský fotbalový stadion Miroslava Valenty; Attendance: 6,325; Referee: Vít Zaoral |

| 17 September 2023 8 | Sparta Prague | 5–0 | Slovácko | Prague |
| 18:00 CEST (UTC+2) | Birmančević 11', 70'; Wiesner 20'; Haraslín 45+1'; Olatunji 81' | Report | Valenta (yellow card) 45+1'; Doski (yellow card) 90' | Stadium: epet ARENA; Attendance: 17,039; Referee: Jan Všetečka |

| 23 September 2023 9 | Slovácko | 2–0 | Karviná | Uherské Hradiště |
| 15:00 CEST (UTC+2) | Holzer 2'; Valenta 18' | Report | | Stadium: Městský fotbalový stadion Miroslava Valenty; Attendance: 4,516; Referee: Dalibor Černý |

| 30 September 2023 10 | Jablonec | 2–0 | Slovácko | Jablonec nad Nisou |
| 15:00 CEST (UTC+2) | Chramosta 10', (yellow card) 56'; Krulich 20'; Hanuš (yellow card) 88' | Report | Doski (yellow card) 31'; Cicilia (yellow card) 59'; Svědík (coach) (yellow card) 60'; Heča (yellow card) 62'; Vecheta (yellow card) 73'; Valenta (yellow card) 88' | Stadium: Stadion Střelnice; Attendance: 2,642; Referee: Stanislav Volek |

| 7 October 2023 11 | Slovácko | 2–0 | Teplice | Uherské Hradiště |
| 15:00 CEST (UTC+2) | Cicilia 48'; Havlík 56' | Report | | Stadium: Městský fotbalový stadion Miroslava Valenty; Attendance: 4,232; Referee: Ladislav Szikszay |

| 21 October 2023 12 | Slavia Prague | 2–0 | Slovácko | Prague |
| 18:00 CEST (UTC+2) | Jurásek 78'; Jurečka 90' | Report | | Stadium: Fortuna Arena; Attendance: 17,084; Referee: Jan Petřík |

| 28 October 2023 13 | Slovácko | 1–1 | Slovan Liberec | Uherské Hradiště |
| 15:00 CEST (UTC+2) | Petržela 10'; Valenta (yellow card) 29'; Juroška (yellow card) 76' | Report | Tupta 16', (yellow card) 53'; Žambůrek (yellow card) 35'; Frýdek (yellow card) 59'; Horský (yellow card) 86'; Pourzitidis (yellow card) 87' | Stadium: Městský fotbalový stadion Miroslava Valenty; Attendance: 4,528; Referee: Ondřej Berka |

| 4 November 2023 14 | Slovácko | 0–0 | Hradec Králové | Uherské Hradiště |
| 15:00 CET (UTC+1) | | Report | | Stadium: Městský fotbalový stadion Miroslava Valenty; Attendance: 4,093; Referee: Vít Zaoral |

| 12 November 2023 15 | Viktoria Plzeň | 1–4 | Slovácko | Plzeň |
| 15:00 CET (UTC+1) | Chorý 17' | Report | Doski 43'; Havlík 63', 72'; Juroška 66' | Stadium: Doosan Arena; Attendance: 8,402; Referee: Ondřej Pechanec |

| 26 November 2023 16 | Slovácko | 2–0 | Baník Ostrava | Uherské Hradiště |
| 15:00 CET (UTC+1) | Havlík 30'; Cicilia 71' | Report | | Stadium: Městský fotbalový stadion Miroslava Valenty; Attendance: 6,632; Referee: Dalibor Černý |

| 2 December 2023 17 | Sigma Olomouc | 1–1 | Slovácko | Olomouc |
| 15:00 CET (UTC+1) | Beneš 42' | Report | Daníček 59' (pen.) | Stadium: Andrův stadion Attendance: 2,228; Referee: Michael Kvítek |

| 9 December 2023 18 | Slovácko | 5–2 | Bohemians 1905 | Uherské Hradiště |
| 15:00 CET (UTC+1) | Havlík 2', 53', 65', 77'; Daníček 34' (pen.) | Report | Hála 23'; Köstl 45+3' | Stadium: Městský fotbalový stadion Miroslava Valenty; Attendance: 3,379; Referee: Dominik Starý |

| 16 December 2023 19 | Mladá Boleslav | 0–1 | Slovácko | Mladá Boleslav |
| 15:00 CET (UTC+1) | | Report | Valenta 59' | Stadium: Lokotrans Aréna; Attendance: 1,036; Referee: Ondřej Berka |

| 10 February 2024 20 | Slovácko | 1–2 | Pardubice | Uherské Hradiště |
| 15:00 CET (UTC+1) | Cicilia 89' | Report | Zlatohlávek 14'; Hlavatý 90+1' | Stadium: Městský fotbalový stadion Miroslava Valenty; Attendance: 4,720; Referee: Stanislav Volek |

| 18 February 2024 21 | Zlín | 2–1 | Slovácko | Zlín |
| 15:00 CET (UTC+1) | Slončík 72'; Vukadinović 80' | Report | Juroška 4' | Stadium: Letná Stadion; Attendance: 4,319; Referee: Petr Hocek |

| 25 February 2024 22 | Slovácko | 1–3 | Sparta Prague | Uherské Hradiště |
| 18:00 CET (UTC+1) | Juroška 21' | Report | Vitík 11'; Birmančević 56'; Haraslín 76' | Stadium: Městský fotbalový stadion Miroslava Valenty |

| 2 March 2024 23 | Karviná | 1–3 | Slovácko | Karviná |
| 15:00 CET (UTC+1) | Krčík 30' | Report | Sinyavskiy 37'; Hofmann 58'; Havlík 65' (pen.) | Stadium: Městský stadion Attendance: 1,820; Referee: Marek Radina |

| 9 March 2024 24 | Slovácko | 0–1 | Jablonec | Uherské Hradiště |
| 15:00 CET (UTC+1) | Kohút (yellow card) 26'; Petržela (yellow card) 42'; Kim (yellow card) 90+4' | Report | Kratochvíl (yellow card) 28'; Hollý (yellow card) 40'; Štěpánek 61'; Alégué (yellow card) 89' | Stadium: Městský fotbalový stadion Miroslava Valenty; Attendance: 4,229; Referee: Jan Všetečka |

| 16 March 2024 25 | Teplice | 1–1 | Slovácko | Teplice |
| 18:00 CET (UTC+1) | Fila 12' | Report | Juroška 11' | Stadium: Na Stínadlech; Attendance: 3,931; Referee: Vít Zaoral |

| 30 March 2024 26 | Slovácko | 1–3 | Slavia Prague | Uherské Hradiště |
| 18:00 CET (UTC+1) | Vecheta 40' | Report | Provod 29'; Jurečka 44', 56' (pen.) | Stadium: Městský fotbalový stadion Miroslava Valenty; Attendance: 8,000; Referee: Karel Rouček |

| 6 April 2024 27 | Slovan Liberec | 4–1 | Slovácko | Liberec |
| 15:00 CEST (UTC+2) | Kulenović 6'; Tupta 23'; Prebsl 56'; Fukala 85'; Varfolomeyev (yellow card) 90+1' | Report | Pourzitidis 53' (o.g.); Kalabiška (yellow card) 59' | Stadium: Stadion u Nisy; Attendance: 3,451; Referee: Jan Petřík |

| 13 April 2024 28 | Hradec Králové | 1–0 | Slovácko | Hradec Králové |
| 18:00 CEST (UTC+2) | Harazim 77' | Report | | Stadium: Malšovická aréna Attendance: 6,012; Referee: Ladislav Szikszay |

| 21 April 2024 29 | Slovácko | 1–1 | Viktoria Plzeň | Uherské Hradiště |
| 18:00 CEST (UTC+2) | Daníček 73' (pen.) | Report | Metsoko 41' | Stadium: Městský fotbalový stadion Miroslava Valenty; Attendance: 4,631; Referee: Vít Zaoral |

| 28 April 2024 30 | České Budějovice | 2–2 | Slovácko | České Budějovice |
| 15:00 CEST (UTC+2) | Suchan 45+1'; Tranziska 55' | Report | Kim 22'; Mihálik 83' | Stadium: Stadion Střelecký ostrov Attendance: 3,154; Referee: Marek Radina |

==== Championship group ====
| Pos | Team | Pld | W | D | L | GF | GA | GD | Pts | Qualification or relegation | SPA | SLA | PLZ | OST | MLA | SLO |
|---|---|---|---|---|---|---|---|---|---|---|---|---|---|---|---|---|
| 1 | Sparta Prague (C) | 35 | 27 | 6 | 2 | 82 | 30 | +52 | 87 | Qualification for the Champions League second qualifying round | — | 0–0 | 1–1 | 2–1 | — | — |
| 2 | Slavia Prague | 35 | 26 | 7 | 2 | 76 | 24 | +52 | 85 | Qualification for the Champions League third qualifying round (Note: Since the Europa League winners, Atalanta qualified for the Champions League via league position, Slavia Prague were promoted from the Champions League second qualifying round to the third qualifying round as one of the two teams with the highest coefficient in the second qualifying round.) | — | — | 3–0 | 5–0 | 4–0 | — |
| 3 | Viktoria Plzeň | 35 | 21 | 7 | 7 | 76 | 40 | +36 | 70 | Qualification for the Europa League third qualifying round | — | — | — | 1–1 | 3–0 | 4–2 |
| 4 | Baník Ostrava | 35 | 14 | 7 | 14 | 56 | 48 | +8 | 49 | Qualification for the Conference League second qualifying round | — | — | — | — | 0–1 | 6–0 |
| 5 | Mladá Boleslav (O) | 35 | 13 | 8 | 14 | 51 | 59 | −8 | 47 | Qualification for the Conference League play-off final | 0–5 | — | — | — | — | 0–1 |
| 6 | Slovácko | 35 | 12 | 8 | 15 | 45 | 56 | −11 | 44 | | 2–4 | 1–2 | — | — | — | — |

Source: Fortuna Liga
Legend: Blue = home team win; Yellow = draw; Red = away team win.
Rules for classification: 1) Total points; 2) Points earned in regular season; 3) Head-to-head points (regular season); 4) Head-to-head goal difference (regular season); 5) Head-to-head goals scored (regular season); 5) Goal difference (all matches); 6) Goals scored (all matches); 7) Fair-play ranking; 8) Draw.
(C) Champions; (O) Play-off winners

===== Results by round =====
| Round | 1 | 2 | 3 | 4 | 5 |
|---|---|---|---|---|---|
| Ground | H | A | A | H | A |
| Result | L | L | W | L | L |
| Position | 6 | 6 | 6 | 6 | 6 |

Source: Fortuna Liga
A = Away; H = Home; W = Win; D = Draw; L = Loss

===== Matches =====
| 5 May 2024 31 | Slovácko | 2–4 | Sparta Prague | Uherské Hradiště |
| 18:00 CEST (UTC+2) | Kim 33'; Daníček 72' (pen.) | Report | Kuchta 12', 24'; Haraslín 63'; Krejčí 90+5' (pen.) | Stadium: Městský fotbalový stadion Miroslava Valenty; Attendance: 7,455; Referee: Karel Rouček |

| 11 May 2024 32 | Viktoria Plzeň | 4–2 | Slovácko | Plzeň |
| 15:00 CEST (UTC+2) | Šulc 16', 90+3' (pen.), 90+8'; Hejda 43' | Report | | Stadium: Doosan Arena; Attendance: 6,740; Referee: Jan Všetečka |

| 14 May 2024 33 | Mladá Boleslav | 0–1 | Slovácko | Mladá Boleslav |
| 17:00 CEST (UTC+2) | Jawo (yellow card) 27' | Report | Juroška 4' | Stadium: Lokotrans Aréna; Attendance: 1,844; Referee: Dalibor Černý |

| 18 May 2024 34 | Slovácko | 1–2 | Slavia Prague | Uherské Hradiště |
| 17:00 CEST (UTC+2) | Zima 65' (o.g.) | Report | Holeš 62'; Chytil 71' | Stadium: Městský fotbalový stadion Miroslava Valenty; Attendance: 6,088; Referee: Ladislav Szikszay |

| 26 May 2024 35 | Baník Ostrava | 6–0 | Slovácko | Ostrava |
| 16:00 CEST (UTC+2) | Ewerton 28' (pen.), 50'; Kubala 30', 36'; Buchta 55'; Ndefe 55'; Tanko 71'; Kpozo 80' | Report | Mihálik (red card) 26'; Šumulikoski (head of department) (yellow card) 31'; Juroška (red card) 62' | Stadium: Městský stadion Attendance: 10,190; Referee: Jan Machálek |
