= 2024–25 FK Dukla Prague season =

FK Dukla Prague
2024–25 season
- Manager: Petr Rada
- Stadium: Stadion Juliska
- Czech First League: Pre-season
- Czech Cup: Pre-season
- Average home league attendance: 3,048

The 2024–25 season was the 77th season in the history of FK Dukla Prague. Dukla Prague returned to the Czech First League after relegation in the 2018–19 season. In addition to the domestic league, the team participated in the Czech Cup.

== Transfers ==
=== In ===
Pos.	Player	Transferred from	Fee	Date	Source
FW	(Bosnia and Herzegovina) Muris Mešanović	(Poland) Puszcza Niepołomice	Undisclosed	1 July 2024	
GK	(Slovakia) Matúš Hruška	(Slovakia) Dukla Banska Bystrica	Undisclosed	1 July 2024	
DF	(Slovakia) Michal Svoboda	(Italy) SPAL	Loan	10 July 2024	
DF	(Albania) Masimiliano Doda	(Italy) Palermo	Undisclosed	11 July 2024	

== Friendlies ==
22 June 2024 Friendly	Táborsko (Czech Republic)	1–3	(Czech Republic) Dukla Prague	Libčice nad Vltavou
11:00	Nečas 86'	Report	Špatenka 21'; Šebrle 60'; Matějka 68'	Stadium: Stadion Libčice nad Vltavou; Attendance: 0

29 June 2024 Friendly	Dukla Prague (Czech Republic)	1–0	(Czech Republic) Dukla Banská Bystrica	Libčice nad Vltavou
11:00	Zeronik 90'	Report		Stadium: Stadion Libčice nad Vltavou

3 July 2024 Friendly	Pardubice (Czech Republic)	1–1	(Czech Republic) Dukla Prague	Lázně Bohdaneč
17:00	Huf 74'	Report	Barac 76'

6 July 2024 Friendly	MFK Chrudim (Czech Republic)	0–2	(Czech Republic) Dukla Prague	Lysá nad Labem
11:00		Report	Zeronik 2'; Šebrle 20'

10 July 2024 Friendly	Dukla Prague (Czech Republic)	3–0	(Czech Republic) FC Písek	Strunkovice
17:30	Mešanović 5'; Šebrle 26'; Matějka 88'	Report

13 July 2024 Friendly	Dukla Prague (Czech Republic)	2–1	(Czech Republic) Slavia Prague B	Prague
18:00	Matějka 23'; Mešanović 74'	Report	Rama 43'	Stadium: Stadion Juliska

14 January 2025 Friendly	Mladá Boleslav (Czech Republic)	5–2	(Czech Republic) Dukla Prague	Mladá Boleslav
14:00	Matyáš Vojta 7'; Ladra 37'; Solomon John 44'; Tobias Gregor 49'; Fulnek 90'	Report	Lichý 20' (pen.); Vondrášek 53'	Stadium: Lokotrans Aréna

19 January 2025 Friendly	Dukla Prague (Czech Republic)	2–2	(Serbia) Partizan	Belek
16:00	Mešanović 28' (pen.); Mikuš (yellow card) 30'; Daniel Kozma (yellow card) 58'; Jorginho 70'	Report	Milan Roganović (yellow card) 3'; Kalulu 8' (yellow card) 45'; Ibrahim Zubairu 10'; Jurčević (yellow card) 13'; Nikolić (yellow card) 15'; Simić (yellow card) 74'; Mihajlo Petrović (yellow card) 78'	Stadium: Cornelia Diamond Hotel

22 January 2025 Friendly	Widzew Łódź (Poland)	2–1	(Czech Republic) Dukla Prague	Lara
10:00	Sobol 59' 73'	Report	Filip Matoušek (yellow card) 37'; Martin Douděra 56'; Jorginho (yellow card) 60'	Stadium: Miracle Resort Hotel Training Center

25 January 2025 Friendly	DAC 1904 (Slovakia)	2–0	(Czech Republic) Dukla Prague	Lara
14:00	Barišić 24' 33'	Report		Stadium: Miracle Resort Hotel Training Center

== Competitions ==
=== Overall record ===
Competition	First match	Last match	Starting round	Final position	Record							
Competition	First match	Last match	Starting round	Final position	Pld	W	D	L	GF	GA	GD	Win %
Czech First League regular season	20 July 2024	19 April 2025	Matchday 1	14th	0	0	0	0	0	0	+0	—
Czech First League relegation round	26 April 2024	25 May 2025	Matchday 1		0	0	0	0	0	0	+0	—
Czech Cup					0	0	0	0	0	0	+0	—
Total					0	0	0	0	0	0	+0	—

Last updated: 20 July 2024
Source: Soccerway

=== Czech First League ===
==== Regular season ====
Pos	Team	Pld	W	D	L	GF	GA	GD	Pts	Qualification or relegation
12	Teplice	30	9	7	14	32	42	−10	34 (Note: Head to head points: Bohemians 1905 8, Mladá Boleslav 7, Teplice 1.)	Qualification for the relegation group
13	Slovácko	30	7	9	14	25	51	−26	30	Qualification for the relegation group
14	Dukla Prague	30	5	9	16	23	47	−24	24	Qualification for the relegation group
15	Pardubice	30	4	7	19	22	49	−27	19	Qualification for the relegation group
16	České Budějovice	30	0	5	25	14	78	−64	5	Qualification for the relegation group

Source: Chance Liga
Rules for classification: 1) Points; 2) Head-to-head points; 3) Head-to-head goal difference; 4) Head-to-head goals scored; 5) Goal difference; 6) Goals scored; 7) Fair-play ranking; 8) Draw.

===== Results summary =====
Overall								Home						Away					
Pld	W	D	L	GF	GA	GD	Pts	W	D	L	GF	GA	GD	W	D	L	GF	GA	GD
30	5	9	16	23	47	−24	24	3	4	8	14	22	−8	2	5	8	9	25	−16

Source: Chance Liga

===== Results by round =====
Round	1	2	3	4	5	6	7	8	9	10	11	12	13	14	15	16	17	18	19	20	21	22	23	24	25	26	27	28	29	30
Ground	H	H	A	H	A	H	A	H	A	H	A	H	A	H	A	A	H	A	H	A	H	A	H	A	H	A	H	A	H	A
Result	L	W	L	L	L	W	D	L	L	L	D	W	L	L	L	L	D	L	L	D	D	D	L	D	D	W	D	W	L	L
Position	14	12	12	14	14	13	13	13	14	14	14	13	13	13	15	15	15	15	15	15	15	15	15	14	14	14	14	14	14	14

Source: Chance Liga
A = Away; H = Home; W = Win; D = Draw; L = Loss

===== Matches =====
The match schedule was released on 20 June 2024.

20 July 2024 1	Dukla Prague	1–3	Viktoria Plzeň	Prague
20:00	Vondrášek (yellow card) 21'; Holiš (yellow card) 55'; Špatenka 81'	Report	Dweh 19'; Šulc 30' (pen.); Peterka 68' (o.g.)	Stadium: Stadion Juliska; Attendance: 4,574; Referee: Jan Machálek

27 July 2024 2	Dukla Prague	1–0	Bohemians 1905	Prague
14:30	Matějka (red card) 23'; Hašek 66'; Douděra (yellow card) 79'; Lichý (yellow card) 90+4'	Report	Hůlka (yellow card) 20'; Dostál (red card) 52'; Čermák (yellow card) 74'; Matoušek (yellow card) 85'	Stadium: Stadion Juliska; Attendance: 5,220; Referee: Lukáš Nehasil

2 August 2024 3	Sparta Prague	2–0	Dukla Prague	Prague
20:00	Vitík 38'; Kairinen (yellow card) 45'; Birmančević 81' (pen.)	Report	Šebrle (yellow card) 52'	Stadium: epet ARENA; Attendance: 16,826; Referee: (Czech Republic) Daniel Vokoun

10 August 2024 4	Dukla Prague	0–2	Jablonec	Prague
14:30	Peterka (yellow card) 72'; Dominik Hašek (yellow card) 84'	Report	Hollý 45'; Kanakimana 89'	Stadium: Stadion Juliska; Attendance: 1,684; Referee: (Czech Republic) Pavel Orel

17 August 2024 5	Hradec Králové	1–0	Dukla Prague	Hradec Králové
14:30 CEST	Mihálik 45+1'	Report	Lichý (yellow card) 34'; Mešanović (yellow card) 35'; David Ludvíček (yellow card) 61'; Martin Douděra (yellow card) 90+3'	Stadium: Malšovická aréna Attendance: 6,125; Referee: (Czech Republic) Jan Všetečka

25 August 2024 6	Dukla Prague	3–0	České Budějovice	Prague
17:00 CEST	Ondřej Ullman (yellow card) 40'; David Ludvíček (yellow card) 44'; Šebrle 58'; Mešanović 63'; Daniel Kozma (yellow card) 80'; Martin Ambler 90+2'	Report	Samuel Šigut (yellow card) 50'	Stadium: Stadion Juliska; Attendance: 2,472; Referee: (Czech Republic) Karel Rouček

1 September 2024 7	Karviná	0–0	Dukla Prague	Karviná
14:30 CEST	Krčík (yellow card) 1'	Report	Šebrle (yellow card) 25'; David Ludvíček (yellow card) 27'; Dominik Hašek (yellow card) 78'; Martin Douděra (yellow card) 90+2'; Hruška (yellow card) 90+5'; Jakub Zeronik (yellow card) 90+7'	Stadium: Městský stadion Attendance: 1,983; Referee: (Czech Republic) Dominik Starý

22 September 2024 9	Sigma Olomouc	2–1	Dukla Prague	Olomouc
15:30 CEST	Kliment 1' 59' (yellow card) 83'; Adam Dohnálek (red card) 6'; Pokorný (yellow card) 12'; Matěj Mikulenka (yellow card) 32'; Chvátal (yellow card) 42'; Dele Israel (yellow card) 90+5'	Report	Dominik Hašek (yellow card) 9'; Lichý (red card) 45'; Peterka (yellow card) 51'; Řezníček 74'; Jakub Zeronik (yellow card) 81'	Stadium: Andrův stadion Attendance: 3,380; Referee: (Czech Republic) Filip Kotala

28 September 2024 10	Dukla Prague	1–4	Slovan Liberec	Prague
13:30 CEST	Jakub Zeronik 2'	Report	Lukáš Letenay 48' 53'; Denis Halinský (yellow card) 50'; Hlavatý 55'; Višinský (yellow card) 85' (goal) 90+1'; Varfolomeyev (yellow card) 88'	Stadium: Stadion Juliska; Attendance: 2,688; Referee: (Czech Republic) Petr Hocek

5 October 2024 11	Teplice	1–1	Dukla Prague	Teplice
16:00 CET	Mareček (yellow card) 10'; Mohamed Yasser 42'; Matěj Radosta (red card) 78'	Report	Mešanović 68'	Stadium: AGC Aréna Na Stínadlech; Attendance: 2,937; Referee: (Czech Republic) Jan Beneš

19 October 2024 12	Dukla Prague	2–1	Pardubice	Prague
16:00 CET	Mešanović 64'; Řezníček 67'	Report	Dominique Simon 38'; Jason Noslin (yellow card) 78'; Daniel Pandula (yellow card) 90+6'	Stadium: Stadion Juliska; Attendance: 3,140; Referee: (Czech Republic) Jan Všetečka

27 October 2024 13	Slavia Prague	3–0	Dukla Prague	Prague
15:30 CET	Chorý 33' (pen.) 89'; Ondřej Lingr (yellow card) 43'; Matěj Jurásek 57'	Report		Stadium: Fortuna Arena; Attendance: 18,402; Referee: (Czech Republic) Dominik Starý

2 November 2024 14	Dukla Prague	0–1	Mladá Boleslav	Prague
13:30 CET	Peterka (yellow card) 77'	Report	Vydra (yellow card) 21'; Suchý 52'; Pulkrab (yellow card) 90+1'	Stadium: Stadion Juliska; Attendance: 1,768; Referee: (Czech Republic) Jan Petřík

9 November 2024 15	Baník Ostrava	6–0	Dukla Prague	Ostrava
13:30 CET	Ewerton 13' 63'; Buchta 16'; Prekop 41' 51'; Dominik Hašek 57' (o.g.)	Report	Hora (yellow card) 48'	Stadium: Městský stadion Attendance: 8,798; Referee: (Czech Republic) Lukáš Nehasil

24 November 2024 16	Bohemians 1905	3–1	Dukla Prague	Prague
13:00 CET	Adam Kadlec 67'; Drchal 75'; Čermák 85'	Report	Šebrle 52'	Stadium: Ďolíček; Attendance: 5,112; Referee: (Czech Republic) Jan Všetečka

30 November 2024 17	Dukla Prague	1–1	Sparta Prague	Prague
19:00 CET	Vondrášek 90+4'	Report	Olatunji 11'	Stadium: Stadion Juliska; Attendance: 6,992; Referee: (Czech Republic) Karel Rouček

4 December 2024 8	Dukla Prague	1–2	Slovácko	Prague
17:30 CET	Mešanović 8'; Daniel Kozma (yellow card) 59'; Hora (yellow card) 80'; Peterka (yellow card) 90+1'	Report	Krmenčík 51' (yellow card) 90+4'; Havlík 56'	Stadium: Stadion Juliska; Attendance: 575; Referee: (Czech Republic) Daniel Vokoun

7 December 2024 18	Jablonec	2–1	Dukla Prague	Jablonec nad Nisou
16:00 CET	Nebyla 16'; Chramosta 33'; Cedidla (yellow card) 88'	Report	David Ludvíček 36'	Stadium: Stadion Střelnice; Attendance: 1,833; Referee: (Czech Republic) Petr Hocek

14 December 2024 19	Dukla Prague	1–2	Hradec Králové	Prague
13:30 CET	Filip Matoušek (yellow card) 63'; Lichý 76'; Hora (yellow card) 81'	Report	Pilař 28'; Štěpán Harazim 33' (yellow card) 58'; Vlkanova (yellow card) 83'	Stadium: Stadion Juliska; Attendance: 1,285; Referee: (Czech Republic) Ladislav Szikszay

1 February 2025 20	České Budějovice	0–0	Dukla Prague	České Budějovice
16:00 CET	Jan Brabec (yellow card) 15'; Ekpai (yellow card) 57'	Report	Daniel Kozma (yellow card) 67'; Peterka (red card) 87'	Stadium: Stadion Střelecký ostrov Attendance: 2,252; Referee: (Czech Republic) Dominik Starý

15 February 2025 22	Slovácko	0–0	Dukla Prague	Uherské Hradiště
16:00 CET	Matyáš Kozák (yellow card) 85'	Report	Řezníček (yellow card) 59'; Hruška (yellow card) 82'	Stadium: Městský fotbalový stadion Miroslava Valenty; Attendance: 3,114; Referee: (Czech Republic) Marek Radina

==== Relegation round ====
Pos	Team	Pld	W	D	L	GF	GA	GD	Pts	Qualification or relegation
11	Teplice	35	12	8	15	41	45	−4	44	
12	Mladá Boleslav	35	11	8	16	48	48	0	41	
13	Slovácko	35	9	11	15	31	56	−25	38	
14	Dukla Prague (O)	35	8	10	17	34	55	−21	34	Qualification for the relegation play-offs
15	Pardubice (O)	35	6	7	22	25	56	−31	25	Qualification for the relegation play-offs
16	České Budějovice (R)	35	0	6	29	16	86	−70	6	Relegation to FNL

Source: Chance Liga
Rules for classification: 1) Total points; 2) Points earned in regular season; 3) Head-to-head points (regular season); 4) Head-to-head goal difference (regular season); 5) Head-to-head goals scored (regular season); 5) Goal difference (all matches); 6) Goals scored (all matches); 7) Fair-play ranking; 8) Draw.
(O) Play-off winners; (R) Relegated

===== Results by round =====
Round	1
Ground	
Result	
Position	

Updated to match(es) played on August 2024. Source:
A = Away; H = Home; W = Win; D = Draw; L = Loss

=== Czech Cup ===
25 September 2024 Second round	Ústí nad Orlicí	0-4	Dukla Prague	Ústí nad Orlicí
16:30	Jan Bednář (yellow card) 9'; Josef Stránský (yellow card) 90+2'	Report	Moulis 32'; Roman Holiš 39'; Řezníček 42'; Matějka 54'	Stadium: TJ Jiskra fotbalový stadion Attendance: 1,120; Referee: (Czech Republic) Vit Zaoral

23 October 2024 Third round	Hořovicko	0-6	Dukla Prague	Hořovice
15:00	Tomáš Kos (yellow card) 20'; Ondřej Sarvaš (yellow card) 44'; Tomáš Hlídek (yellow card) 79'	Report	Martin Douděra 27'; Moulis 42' 55'; David Ludvíček 62' (yellow card) 75'; Matějka 77' 84'	Stadium: Městský stadion Attendance: 600; Referee: (Czech Republic) Adam Trška
