= 2024–25 Czech First League =

Czech First League
- Season: 2024–25
- Dates: 20 July 2024 – 30 May 2025
- Champions: Slavia Prague (8th title)
- Relegated: Č. Budějovice
- Champions League: Slavia Prague, Viktoria Plzeň
- Europa League: Sigma Olomouc, Baník Ostrava
- UEFA Conference League: Sparta Prague
- Matches: 276
- Goals: 734 (2.66 per match)
- Top goalscorer: Jan Kliment (18 goals)
- Biggest home win: Ostrava 6–0 Dukla; 9 November 2024
- Biggest away win: Liberec 0–5 Jablonec; 6 October 2024; Olomouc 0–5 Slavia; 26 April 2025
- Highest scoring: Plzeň 7–2 Č. Budějovice; 15 December 2024
- Total attendance: 1,704,832
- Average attendance: 6,177

The 2024–25 Czech First League, known as the Chance Liga for sponsorship reasons, was the 32nd season of the Czech Republic's top-tier football for professional clubs since its establishment in 1993. Sparta Prague were the reigning champions. The first half of the season had 19 rounds, starting in July 2024 and finishing in December. The second half commenced in February 2025. The season ended on 25 May 2025 with two extra play-out fixtures on 29 May and 1 June 2025.

== Format ==
From the start of the 2024–25 season, the league became known as the "Chance Liga" after its new main sponsor, Chance betting office. The general season format was unchanged from the last season; the 16 clubs played each other home and away, until the league was split up in championship, play-off and relegation groups. The lowest-ranked team were relegated directly to the second league, and the two teams positioned 14th and 15th played a play-out with two teams from the second league positioned 2nd and 3rd in a home and away format. The change was the cancellation of the Conference League play-off final between the team finishing 5th and the team winning the play-off group. The winner of the middle group (i.e. the team placed 7th) only received a financial bonus.

This is the seventh season to use VAR, featuring it in all matches played. The VAR central workplace in the Michle district of Prague was used for the first time. VAR had offside line technology available for the first time.

In the 2024–25 season, three new rules were introduced. The first is the ability for teams to use a sixth substitution if there is a head injury or concussion. Secondly, the punishment for a player in a situation where that player spoils a clear scoring opportunity with his hand was changed, and only a yellow card was awarded instead of a red card. Finally, the assessment of premature running of players into the penalty area during a penalty also changed.

Other changes concern the dates of matches, which is partly due to the new format of the European competitions. The spring part started a week earlier than in previous years (on 1 February) and the exact dates of the matches were determined further in advance than three weeks, as has been the case so far.

== Events ==
SK Dynamo České Budějovice became the first team in the history of the Czech First League to not win any match in the regular season. After continuing the run in the season-ending relegation group, in which they picked up a solitary point, the club finished their 35-game season without winning (29 losses, 6 draws).

== Teams ==
Locations of the 2024–25 Czech First League teams
Prague teams in 2024–25 Czech First League

=== Promotion and relegation (pre-season) ===
A total of sixteen teams contest the league, including 15 sides from the 2023–24 season and the winner of last season's second league.

Team promoted to Czech First League

After being relegated in the 2018–19 season, FK Dukla Prague returned to Czech First League as the champion of the 2023–24 Czech National Football League.

Teams relegated from Czech First League

The lowest positioned team from the last season, FC Zlín, was relegated to the Czech National Football League.

=== Locations and stadiums ===
Team	Location	Stadium	Capacity	Ref.
Bohemians 1905	Prague	Ďolíček	6,300	
SK Dynamo České Budějovice	České Budějovice	Stadion Střelecký ostrov	6,681	
FK Dukla Prague	Prague	Stadion Juliska	8,150	
FC Hradec Králové	Hradec Králové	Malšovická aréna	9,300	
FK Jablonec	Jablonec nad Nisou	Stadion Střelnice	6,108	
MFK Karviná	Karviná	Městský stadion (Karviná)	4,833	
FC Slovan Liberec	Liberec	Stadion u Nisy	9,900	
FK Mladá Boleslav	Mladá Boleslav	Lokotrans Aréna	5,000	
SK Sigma Olomouc	Olomouc	Andrův stadion	12,474	
FC Baník Ostrava	Ostrava	Městský stadion (Ostrava)	15,123	
FK Pardubice	Pardubice	CFIG Arena	4,620	
FC Viktoria Plzeň	Plzeň	Doosan Arena	11,700	
SK Slavia Prague	Prague	Fortuna Arena	19,370	
1. FC Slovácko	Uherské Hradiště	Městský fotbalový stadion Miroslava Valenty	8,000	
AC Sparta Prague	Prague	epet ARENA	18,944	
FK Teplice	Teplice	Na Stínadlech	18,221	

Rank	Region	Number of teams	Club(s)
1	Prague	4	Bohemians 1905, Dukla Prague, Sparta Prague, Slavia Prague
2	Liberec	2	Jablonec, Slovan Liberec
2	Moravian-Silesian	2	Baník Ostrava, Karviná
4	Central Bohemian	1	Mladá Boleslav
4	Hradec Králové	1	Hradec Králové
4	Olomouc	1	Sigma Olomouc
4	Pardubice	1	Pardubice
4	Plzeň	1	Viktoria Plzeň
4	South Bohemian	1	Dynamo České Budějovice
4	Ústí nad Labem	1	Teplice
4	Zlín	1	Slovácko

=== Personnel and sponsoring ===
Teams	Manager	Captain	Kit maker	Main sponsor
Bohemians	(Football Association of the Czech Republic) Jaroslav Veselý	(Football Association of the Czech Republic) Josef Jindřišek	Puma	BALshop
České Budějovice	(Football Association of the Czech Republic) Jiří Lerch	(Football Association of the Czech Republic) Zdeněk Ondrášek	Adidas	Tipsport
Dukla Prague	(Football Association of the Czech Republic) Petr Rada	(Football Association of the Czech Republic) Jan Peterka	Adidas	Carbounion
Hradec Králové	(Football Association of the Czech Republic) David Horejš	(Football Association of the Czech Republic) Petr Kodeš	Jako	Hradec Králové
Jablonec	(Football Association of the Czech Republic) Luboš Kozel	(Football Association of Serbia) Nemanja Tekijaški	Capelli Sport	24live
Karviná	(Football Association of the Czech Republic) Martin Hyský	(Football Association of the Czech Republic) Jaroslav Svozil	Joma	OKD
Slovan Liberec	(Football Association of the Czech Republic) Radoslav Kováč	(Football Association of the Czech Republic) Jan Mikula	Nike	Tipsport
Mladá Boleslav	(Football Association of the Czech Republic) Josef Jinoch (Football Association of the Czech Republic) Pavel Malura (Football Association of the Czech Republic) Jakub Harant	(Football Association of the Czech Republic) Marek Matějovský	Puma	Škoda Auto
Sigma Olomouc	(Football Association of the Czech Republic) Tomáš Janotka	(Football Association of the Czech Republic) Radim Breite	Adidas	Tipsport
Baník Ostrava	(Football Association of the Czech Republic) Pavel Hapal	(Brazilian Football Confederation) Ewerton	Macron	Fortuna
Pardubice	(Football Association of the Czech Republic) David Střihavka	(Football Association of the Czech Republic) Kamil Vacek	Joma	ČPP Servis
Viktoria Plzeň	(Football Association of the Czech Republic) Miroslav Koubek	(Football Association of the Czech Republic) Lukáš Kalvach	Macron	Doosan Škoda Power
Slavia Prague	(Football Association of the Czech Republic) Jindřich Trpišovský	(Football Association of the Czech Republic) Jan Bořil	Puma	eToro
Slovácko	(Football Association of the Czech Republic) Tomáš Palinek	(Football Association of the Czech Republic) Stanislav Hofmann	Puma	Z-Group
Sparta Prague	(Football Association of the Czech Republic) Luboš Loučka	(Football Association of the Czech Republic) Filip Panák	Adidas	Betano
Teplice	(Slovak Football Association) Zdenko Frťala	(Football Association of the Czech Republic) Lukáš Mareček	Macron	AGC Glass Europe

== Managerial changes ==
Ahead of the season:

Team	Outgoing manager	Manner of departure	Date of vacancy	Replaced by	Date of appointment	Contract valid until
Slovan Liberec	(Football Association of the Czech Republic) Luboš Kozel	End of contract	30 June 2024	(Football Association of the Czech Republic) Radoslav Kováč	26 May 2024	Undisclosed
Pardubice	(Football Association of the Czech Republic) Radoslav Kováč	Mutual consent	25 May 2024	(Football Association of the Czech Republic) Jiří Saňák	27 May 2024	Undisclosed
Sigma Olomouc	(Football Association of the Czech Republic) Jiří Saňák	Sacked	12 May 2024	(Football Association of the Czech Republic) Tomáš Janotka	29 May 2024	Undisclosed
Karviná	(Football Association of the Czech Republic) Marek Bielan	Sacked	30 June 2024	(Football Association of the Czech Republic) Martin Hyský	11 June 2024	Undisclosed
Sparta Prague	(Danish Football Association) Brian Priske	Mutual consent	12 June 2024	(Danish Football Association) Lars Friis	12 June 2024	Undisclosed
Slovácko	(Football Association of the Czech Republic) Martin Svědík	Mutual consent	31 May 2024	(Football Association of the Czech Republic) Roman West	12 June 2024	Undisclosed
Jablonec	(Football Association of the Czech Republic) Radoslav Látal	Sacked	7 June 2024	(Football Association of the Czech Republic) Luboš Kozel	17 June 2024	Undisclosed

During the season:

Team	Outgoing manager	Manner of departure	Date of vacancy	Match-week	Position in table	Replaced by	Date of appointment	Contract valid until
České Budějovice	(Football Association of the Czech Republic) Jiří Lerch	Sacked	28 July 2024	2	16th	(Football Association of the Czech Republic) František Straka	28 July 2024	Undisclosed
Mladá Boleslav	(Football Association of the Czech Republic) David Holoubek	Mutual consent	24 August 2024	5	10th	(Swedish Football Association) Andreas Brännström	24 August 2024	Undisclosed
Pardubice	(Football Association of the Czech Republic) Jiří Saňák	Sacked	26 October 2024	13	15th	(Football Association of the Czech Republic) David Střihavka	29 October 2024	Undisclosed
Slovácko	(Football Association of the Czech Republic) Roman West	Sacked	27 October 2024	13	8th	(Football Association of the Czech Republic) Ondřej Smetana	14 November 2024	Summer 2027
České Budějovice	(Football Association of the Czech Republic) František Straka	Sacked	10 January 2025	19	16th	(Football Association of the Czech Republic) Jiří Lerch	12 January 2025	Undisclosed
Slovácko	(Football Association of the Czech Republic) Ondřej Smetana	Sacked	31 March 2025	27	13th	(Football Association of the Czech Republic) Tomáš Palinek	31 March 2025	End of the season
Mladá Boleslav	(Swedish Football Association) Andreas Brännström	Mutual consent	8 April 2025	28	10th	(Football Association of the Czech Republic) Josef Jinoch (Football Association of the Czech Republic) Pavel Malura (Football Association of the Czech Republic) Jakub Harant	8 April 2025	End of the season
Sparta Prague	(Danish Football Association) Lars Friis	Sacked	15 May 2025	33	4th	(Football Association of the Czech Republic) Luboš Loučka	15 May 2025	End of the season

== Regular season ==
=== League table ===
Pos	Team	Pld	W	D	L	GF	GA	GD	Pts	Qualification or relegation
1	Slavia Prague	30	25	3	2	61	11	+50	78	Qualification for the championship group
2	Viktoria Plzeň	30	20	5	5	59	28	+31	65	Qualification for the championship group
3	Baník Ostrava	30	20	4	6	52	26	+26	64	Qualification for the championship group
4	Sparta Prague	30	19	5	6	56	33	+23	62	Qualification for the championship group
5	Jablonec	30	15	6	9	47	25	+22	51	Qualification for the championship group
6	Sigma Olomouc	30	12	7	11	46	41	+5	43	Qualification for the championship group
7	Slovan Liberec	30	11	9	10	45	31	+14	42	Qualification for the middle group
8	Karviná	30	11	8	11	40	52	−12	41	Qualification for the middle group
9	Hradec Králové	30	11	7	12	33	31	+2	40	Qualification for the middle group
10	Bohemians 1905	30	8	10	12	32	42	−10	34 (Note: Head to head points: Bohemians 1905 8, Mladá Boleslav 7, Teplice 1.)	Qualification for the middle group
11	Mladá Boleslav	30	9	7	14	40	40	0	34	Qualification for the relegation group
12	Teplice	30	9	7	14	32	42	−10	34	Qualification for the relegation group
13	Slovácko	30	7	9	14	25	51	−26	30	Qualification for the relegation group
14	Dukla Prague	30	5	9	16	23	47	−24	24	Qualification for the relegation group
15	Pardubice	30	4	7	19	22	49	−27	19	Qualification for the relegation group
16	České Budějovice	30	0	5	25	14	78	−64	5	Qualification for the relegation group

Source: Chance Liga
Rules for classification: 1) Points; 2) Head-to-head points; 3) Head-to-head goal difference; 4) Head-to-head goals scored; 5) Goal difference; 6) Goals scored; 7) Fair-play ranking; 8) Draw.

=== Results ===
Home \ Away	BOH	CBU	DUK	HKR	JAB	KAR	LIB	MLA	PCE	OLO	OST	PLZ	SLA	SLO	SPA	TEP
Bohemians 1905	—	1–0	3–1	0–3	1–2	3–3	0–0	2–2	0–0	0–1	2–1	1–2	0–4	3–3	1–2	1–1
České Budějovice	0–0	—	0–0	0–2	2–3	2–3	0–0	0–4	1–3	0–2	0–4	0–3	0–4	0–2	0–2	1–1
Dukla Prague	1–0	3–0	—	1–2	0–2	0–0	1–4	0–1	2–1	1–3	1–2	1–3	0–0	1–2	1–1	1–1
Hradec Králové	2–2	1–0	1–0	—	1–1	1–1	0–2	2–1	3–0	1–1	0–1	0–1	1–1	3–0	0–2	1–0
Jablonec	0–1	5–0	2–1	2–0	—	5–0	0–0	2–0	1–0	0–0	3–1	0–0	1–2	4–2	1–2	3–0
Karviná	1–2	4–1	0–0	0–0	1–0	—	1–3	3–1	1–0	2–1	0–0	1–2	0–4	2–0	2–3	1–1
Slovan Liberec	2–2	2–0	1–1	0–0	0–5	2–3	—	3–1	3–0	1–1	0–1	1–1	0–1	4–0	1–0	3–0
Mladá Boleslav	1–2	4–0	0–1	3–0	0–1	1–1	1–0	—	2–2	1–3	0–0	0–2	0–2	3–0	2–2	2–1
Pardubice	2–0	0–0	0–1	2–1	2–0	0–1	1–1	0–3	—	2–2	2–3	0–0	0–2	0–1	1–2	0–1
Sigma Olomouc	1–3	3–0	2–1	1–2	0–0	1–2	1–4	3–2	4–0	—	2–2	2–1	1–2	2–1	1–2	2–1
Baník Ostrava	1–0	2–1	6–0	1–0	1–0	2–1	2–0	2–1	5–2	1–0	—	1–3	0–1	3–1	1–1	2–0
Viktoria Plzeň	2–0	7–2	4–2	1–0	3–2	5–0	3–2	1–1	2–0	2–1	0–1	—	1–3	2–0	1–0	1–1
Slavia Prague	2–0	4–0	3–0	2–1	3–0	5–1	1–0	1–0	2–0	2–0	1–0	3–0	—	2–0	2–1	2–1
Slovácko	0–0	2–1	0–0	1–5	0–0	2–1	0–4	1–1	1–1	2–2	1–0	1–0	0–0	—	0–2	0–2
Sparta Prague	1–0	2–1	2–0	3–0	2–1	4–1	2–1	2–0	2–1	2–3	1–3	2–4	2–0	2–2	—	1–1
Teplice	1–2	5–2	1–1	1–0	0–1	1–3	2–1	1–2	2–0	1–0	2–3	0–2	1–0	1–0	1–4	—

Source: Chance Liga
Legend: Blue = home team win; Yellow = draw; Red = away team win.
For upcoming matches, an "a" indicates there is an article about the rivalry between the two participants.

== Championship group ==
Points and goals were carried over in full from the regular season.

Pos	Team	Pld	W	D	L	GF	GA	GD	Pts	Qualification or relegation	SLA	PLZ	OST	SPA	JAB	OLO
1	Slavia Prague (C)	35	29	3	3	77	18	+59	90	Qualification for the Champions League league phase	—	4–3	3–0	2–1	—	—
2	Viktoria Plzeň	35	23	5	7	71	36	+35	74	Qualification for the Champions League second qualifying round	—	—	1–2	2–0	4–1	—
3	Baník Ostrava	35	22	5	8	58	34	+24	71	Qualification for the Europa League second qualifying round	—	—	—	3–2	1–2	0–0
4	Sparta Prague	35	19	6	10	61	44	+17	63	Qualification for the Conference League second qualifying round	—	—	—	—	1–3	1–1
5	Jablonec	35	19	6	10	60	33	+27	63		3–2	—	—	—	—	4–0
6	Sigma Olomouc	35	12	9	14	48	53	−5	45	Qualification for the Europa League play-off round (Note: The winner of the 2024–25 Czech Cup (Sigma Olomouc) qualifies for the Europa League play-off round.)	0–5	1–2	—	—	—	—

Source: Chance Liga
Rules for classification: 1) Total points; 2) Points earned in regular season; 3) Head-to-head points (regular season); 4) Head-to-head goal difference (regular season); 5) Head-to-head goals scored (regular season); 5) Goal difference (all matches); 6) Goals scored (all matches); 7) Fair-play ranking; 8) Draw.
(C) Champions

== Middle group ==
Teams will play a group for placement. Starting in the 2024–25 season, the group winner will no longer be awarded the Conference League play-off against the fourth-placed or fifth-placed of the championship group and will only receive a financial bonus.

First round
Bohemians 1905	4	0	4
Slovan Liberec	1	1	2
Hradec Králové	1	4	5
Karviná	0	0	0

Second round
Bohemians 1905	1	0	1
Hradec Králové	0	2	2

== Relegation group ==
Points and goals were carried over in full from the regular season.

Pos	Team	Pld	W	D	L	GF	GA	GD	Pts	Qualification or relegation	TEP	MLA	SLO	DUK	PCE	CBU
11	Teplice	35	12	8	15	41	45	−4	44		—	—	1–0	2–2	3–0	—
12	Mladá Boleslav	35	11	8	16	48	48	0	41		1–0	—	2–2	2–3	—	—
13	Slovácko	35	9	11	15	31	56	−25	38		—	—	—	3–2	1–0	0–0
14	Dukla Prague (O)	35	8	10	17	34	55	−21	34	Qualification for the relegation play-offs	—	—	—	—	2–0	2–1
15	Pardubice (O)	35	6	7	22	25	56	−31	25	Qualification for the relegation play-offs	—	2–1	—	—	—	1–0
16	České Budějovice (R)	35	0	6	29	16	86	−70	6	Relegation to FNL	0–3	1–2	—	—	—	—

Source: Chance Liga
Rules for classification: 1) Total points; 2) Points earned in regular season; 3) Head-to-head points (regular season); 4) Head-to-head goal difference (regular season); 5) Head-to-head goals scored (regular season); 5) Goal difference (all matches); 6) Goals scored (all matches); 7) Fair-play ranking; 8) Draw.
(O) Play-off winners; (R) Relegated

== Relegation play-offs ==
Teams placed 14th and 15th in the relegation group faced the teams placed 2nd and 3rd in the Czech National Football League for two spots in the next season.

Team 1	Agg.	Team 2	1st leg	2nd leg
Vyškov	1–1 (2–4 p)	Dukla Prague	0–0	1–1 (a.e.t.)
Pardubice	2–1	Chrudim	2–0	0–1

== Season statistics ==
=== Top scorers ===
Final standings

Rank	Player	Club	Goals
1	(Football Association of the Czech Republic) Jan Kliment	Olomouc	18
2	(Football Association of the Czech Republic) Pavel Šulc	Plzeň	15
3	(Football Association of the Czech Republic) Tomáš Chorý	Slavia	14
4	(Football Association of the Czech Republic) Filip Vecheta	Karviná	13
4	(Brazilian Football Confederation) Ewerton	Ostrava	13
4	(Football Association of the Czech Republic) Vasil Kušej	Mladá Boleslav / Slavia	13
7	(Slovak Football Association) Lukáš Haraslín	Sparta	11
8	(Football Association of the Czech Republic) Matyáš Vojta	Mladá Boleslav	10
8	(Football Association of Bosnia and Herzegovina) Amar Memić	Karviná / Plzeň	10
8	(Football Association of the Czech Republic) Matěj Vydra	Plzeň	10

=== Hat-tricks ===
Matchweek	Date	Player	For	Against	Result
2	28 July 2024	(Football Association of the Czech Republic) Daniel Mareček	Mladá Boleslav	Slovácko	3–0 (H)
15	10 November 2024	(Football Association of the Czech Republic) Mojmír Chytil	Slavia	Karviná	5–1 (H)
16	24 November 2024	(Football Association of the Czech Republic) Denis Višinský	Liberec	Olomouc	4–1 (A)
18	8 December 2024	(Football Association of the Czech Republic) Marek Matějovský	Mladá Boleslav	České Budějovice	4–0 (A)
19	15 December 2024	(Football Association of the Czech Republic) Jan Kopic	Plzeň	České Budějovice	7–2 (H)
22	15 February 2025	(Slovak Football Association) Lukáš Haraslín	Sparta	Karviná	3–2 (A)
26	16 March 2025	(Football Association of the Czech Republic) Filip Vecheta	Karviná	České Budějovice	3–2 (A)
31	26 April 2025	(Football Association of the Czech Republic) Vasil Kušej	Slavia	Olomouc	5–1 (H)

Notes

(H) – Home team, (A) – Away team

=== Clean sheets ===
Final standings

Rank	Player	Club	Clean sheets
1	(Football Association of the Czech Republic) Jan Hanuš	Jablonec	16
2	(Football Association of the Czech Republic) Matouš Trmal	Mladá Boleslav / Teplice	13
3	(Football Association of the Czech Republic) Antonín Kinský	Slavia	12
3	(Football Association of the Czech Republic) Adam Zadražil	Hradec Králové	12
5	(Slovak Football Association) Matúš Hruška	Dukla	10
6	(Football Association of the Czech Republic) Martin Jedlička	Plzeň	9
6	(Football Association of the Czech Republic) Jindřich Staněk	Slavia	9
7	(Danish Football Association) Peter Vindahl	Sparta	8
9	(Football Association of the Czech Republic) Milan Heča	Slovácko	7
9	(Football Association of the Czech Republic) Jakub Markovič	Ostrava / Slavia	7
9	(Football Association of the Czech Republic) Jakub Lapeš	Karviná	7
9	(Slovak Football Association) Dominik Holec	Ostrava	7

== Attendances ==
Rank	Club	Average
1	SK Slavia Praha	18,306
2	AC Sparta Praha	15,865
3	FC Baník Ostrava	10,276
4	FC Viktoria Plzeň	8,922
5	FC Hradec Králové	6,225
6	SK Sigma Olomouc	5,267
7	Bohemians Praha 1905	5,101
8	1. FC Slovácko	4,188
9	FK Teplice	4,078
10	FC Slovan Liberec	3,430
11	FK Dukla Praha	3,048
12	FK Jablonec	3,007
13	SK Dynamo České Budějovice	2,898
14	FK Pardubice	2,547
15	MFK Karviná	2,416
16	FK Mladá Boleslav	2,231

== See also ==
- 2024–25 Czech National Football League
- 2024–25 Czech Cup
