= 2024–25 1. FC Slovácko season =

1. FC Slovácko
2024–25 season
- Manager: Roman West
- Stadium: Městský fotbalový stadion Miroslava Valenty
- Czech First League: Pre-season
- Czech Cup: Pre-season
- Average home league attendance: 4,188

The 2024–25 season is the 98th season in the history of 1. FC Slovácko, and the club's 16th consecutive season in Czech First League. In addition to the domestic league, the team is scheduled to participate in the Czech Cup.

== Transfers ==
=== In ===
Pos.	Player	Transferred from	Fee	Date	Source
DF	(Slovakia) Filip Vaško	(Slovakia) Zemplín Michalovce	Free	10 July 2024	
MF	(Brazil) Dyjan	(Slovakia) OFK Malženice	Free	10 July 2024	
MF	(Croatia) Robert Mišković	(Romania) Politehnica Iași	Undisclosed	3 January 2025	

=== Out ===
Pos.	Player	Transferred to	Fee	Date	Source
DF	(Iraq) Merchas Doski	(Czech Republic) Viktoria Plzeň	Undisclosed	1 January 2025	

== Friendlies ==
=== Pre-season ===
29 June 2024 Friendly	Zbrojovka Brno (Czech Republic)	1–0	(Czech Republic) Slovácko	Lanžhot
11:00	Kronus 86'			Stadium: Na Šlajsi

3 July 2024 Friendly	FK TSC (Serbia)	1–1	(Czech Republic) Slovácko	Rogla, Slovenia
18:00				Stadium: Štadion Rogla

6 July 2024 Friendly	Olimpija Ljubljana (Slovenia)	3–1	(Czech Republic) Slovácko	Ljubljana, Slovenia
11:00				Stadium: Kodeljevo Sports Park

10 July 2024 Friendly	Slovácko (Czech Republic)	2–2	(Slovakia) MFK Skalica
17:00

13 July 2024 Friendly	Slovácko (Czech Republic)	4–1	(Czech Republic) Žižkov	Uherské Hradiště
17:00				Stadium: Městský fotbalový stadion Miroslava Valenty

== Competitions ==
=== Overall record ===
Competition	First match	Last match	Starting round	Final position	Record							
Competition	First match	Last match	Starting round	Final position	Pld	W	D	L	GF	GA	GD	Win %
Czech First League regular season	20 July 2024	19 April 2025	Matchday 1	14th	0	0	0	0	0	0	+0	—
Czech First League relegation round	26 April 2024	25 May 2025	Matchday 1		0	0	0	0	0	0	+0	—
Czech Cup					0	0	0	0	0	0	+0	—
Total					0	0	0	0	0	0	+0	—

Source: Soccerway

=== Czech First League ===
==== Regular season ====
Pos	Team	Pld	W	D	L	GF	GA	GD	Pts	Qualification or relegation
11	Mladá Boleslav	30	9	7	14	40	40	0	34 (Note: Head to head points: Bohemians 1905 8, Mladá Boleslav 7, Teplice 1.)	Qualification for the relegation group
12	Teplice	30	9	7	14	32	42	−10	34	Qualification for the relegation group
13	Slovácko	30	7	9	14	25	51	−26	30	Qualification for the relegation group
14	Dukla Prague	30	5	9	16	23	47	−24	24	Qualification for the relegation group
15	Pardubice	30	4	7	19	22	49	−27	19	Qualification for the relegation group

Source: Chance Liga
Rules for classification: 1) Points; 2) Head-to-head points; 3) Head-to-head goal difference; 4) Head-to-head goals scored; 5) Goal difference; 6) Goals scored; 7) Fair-play ranking; 8) Draw.

==== Results summary ====
Overall								Home						Away					
Pld	W	D	L	GF	GA	GD	Pts	W	D	L	GF	GA	GD	W	D	L	GF	GA	GD
0	0	0	0	0	0	0	0	0	0	0	0	0	0	0	0	0	0	0	0

Source: Chance Liga

==== Results by round ====
Round	1
Ground	H
Result	
Position	

Source: Chance Liga
A = Away; H = Home; W = Win; D = Draw; L = Loss

==== Matches ====
The match schedule was released on 20 June 2024.

21 July 2024 1	Slovácko	v	Slavia Prague	Uherské Hradiště
17:00 CEST (UTC+2)		Report		Stadium: Městský fotbalový stadion Miroslava Valenty

==== Relegation round ====
Pos	Team	Pld	W	D	L	GF	GA	GD	Pts	Qualification or relegation
11	Teplice	35	12	8	15	41	45	−4	44	
12	Mladá Boleslav	35	11	8	16	48	48	0	41	
13	Slovácko	35	9	11	15	31	56	−25	38	
14	Dukla Prague (O)	35	8	10	17	34	55	−21	34	Qualification for the relegation play-offs
15	Pardubice (O)	35	6	7	22	25	56	−31	25	Qualification for the relegation play-offs
16	České Budějovice (R)	35	0	6	29	16	86	−70	6	Relegation to FNL

Source: Chance Liga
Rules for classification: 1) Total points; 2) Points earned in regular season; 3) Head-to-head points (regular season); 4) Head-to-head goal difference (regular season); 5) Head-to-head goals scored (regular season); 5) Goal difference (all matches); 6) Goals scored (all matches); 7) Fair-play ranking; 8) Draw.
(O) Play-off winners; (R) Relegated
