= Vlasiy Sinyavskiy =

Estonian footballer (born 1996)

Personal information
- Date of birth: 27 November 1996 (age 29)
- Place of birth: Narva, Estonia
- Height: 1.81 m (5 ft 11 in)
- Position: Midfielder

Team information
- Current team: Baník Ostrava
- Number: 99

Youth career
- 2007–2009: Narva Trans
- 2010–2012: TJK Legion
- 2013–2014: Puuma

Senior career*
Years	Team	Apps	(Gls)
2012	Velldoris	4	(0)
2013–2015	Puuma	73	(13)
2015	Narva Trans	19	(2)
2015–2018	Nõmme Kalju	24	(3)
2017	→ Tulevik (loan)	17	(2)
2018–2021	Flora	70	(12)
2021–2022	Karviná	42	(5)
2022–2025	Slovácko	85	(4)
2025–2026	Bohemians 1905	19	(0)
2026–	Baník Ostrava	9	(0)
2026–	Baník Ostrava	3	(0)

International career^{‡}
2016–2018	Estonia U21	19	(2)
2016	Estonia U23	1	(0)
2019–	Estonia	50	(1)
- * Club domestic league appearances and goals as of 25 May 2026 ‡ National team caps and goals as of 9 June 2026

Vlasiy Sinyavskiy (born 27 November 1996) is an Estonian professional footballer who plays as a midfielder for the Czech First League club Baník Ostrava and the Estonia national team.

== Club career ==
He started his professional career in Narva for JK Narva Trans, where he scored 2 goals in 19 caps in Meistriliiga. In January 2016, he moved to Nõmme Kalju FC, where he played 24 games in 3 seasons and scored 3 goals in total. He was also on a short-term loan in Tulevik, where he scored 2 goals in 19 games. In February 2021, he joined another Meistriliiga side Flora, where he scored 12 goals in 70 games in a span of 3 seasons. In February 2021, he joined a Czech First League side MFK Karviná, where he spent 17 months before joining 1. FC Slovácko. He spent 3 seasons in Uherské Hradiště before joining Bohemians 1905 in July 2025.

On 6 January 2026, Sinyavskiy signed a three-year contract with Baník Ostrava with option.

== International career ==
Sinyavskiy received Estonian citizenship in 2001. He made his senior international debut for Estonia on 8 June 2019, starting on the left wing in a 1–2 home loss to Northern Ireland in a UEFA Euro 2020 qualifying match.

== Career statistics ==
=== Club ===
As of match played 4 October 2025

Appearances and goals by club, season and competition
Club	Season	League			Cup		Europe		Other		Total	
Club	Season	Division	Apps	Goals	Apps	Goals	Apps	Goals	Apps	Goals	Apps	Goals
Puuma	2013	Esiliiga	24	1	2	0	—		—		26	1
Puuma	2014	Esiliiga	33	8	2	1	—		—		35	9
Puuma	2015	Esiliiga B	16	4	0	0	—		—		16	4
Puuma	Total		73	13	4	1	—		—		77	14
Narva Trans	2015	Meistriliiga	19	2	1	1	—		—		20	3
Nõmme Kalju U21	2016	Esiliiga	24	3	—		—		—		24	3
Nõmme Kalju U21	2017	Esiliiga B	13	3	—		—		—		13	3
Nõmme Kalju U21	2018	Esiliiga	3	1	—		—		—		3	1
Nõmme Kalju U21	Total		40	7	—		—		—		40	7
Nõmme Kalju	2016	Meistriliiga	10	0	3	1	1 (Note: Appearance in UEFA Europa League)	0	1 (Note: Appearance in Estonian Supercup)	0	15	1
Nõmme Kalju	2017	Meistriliiga	5	1	0	0	0	0	—		5	1
Nõmme Kalju	2018	Meistriliiga	9	2	0	0	—		—		9	2
Nõmme Kalju	Total		24	3	3	1	1	0	1	0	29	4
Tulevik (loan)	2017	Meistriliiga	17	2	2	1	—		—		19	3
Flora U21	2018	Esiliiga	10	11	—		—		—		10	11
Flora U21	2019	Esiliiga	1	0	—		—		—		1	0
Flora U21	Total		11	11	—		—		—		11	11
Flora	2018	Meistriliiga	7	1	1	1	—		—		8	2
Flora	2019	Meistriliiga	36	6	3	4	—		—		39	10
Flora	2020	Meistriliiga	27	5	3	0	4 (Note: One appearance in UEFA Champions League, three appearances and one goal in UEFA Europa League)	1	1	0	35	6
Flora	Total		70	12	7	5	4	1	1	0	82	18
Karviná	2020–21	Czech First League	11	1	—		—		—		11	1
Karviná	2021–22	Czech First League	31	4	2	0	—		—		33	4
Karviná	Total		42	5	2	0	—		—		44	5
Slovácko	2022–23	Czech First League	26	2	2	0	7 (Note: Two appearances in UEFA Europa League, five appearances and two gaols in UEFA Conference League)	2	—		35	4
Slovácko	2023–24	Czech First League	30	0	0	0	—		—		30	0
Slovácko	2024–25	Czech First League	29	2	1	0	—		—		30	2
Slovácko	Total		85	4	3	0	7	0	—		95	4
Bohemians 1905	2025–26	Czech First League	10	0	2	0	—		—		12	0
Career total			391	59	24	9	12	3	2	0	429	71

=== International ===
As of match played 9 June 2026

Appearances and goals by national team and year
National team	Year	Apps	Goals
Estonia	2019	2	0
Estonia	2020	5	0
Estonia	2021	8	0
Estonia	2022	7	0
Estonia	2023	10	0
Estonia	2024	7	1
Estonia	2025	9	0
Estonia	2026	2	0
Total		50	1

International goals

No.	Date	Venue	Opponent	Score	Result	Competition
1.	11 October 2024	Lilleküla Stadium, Tallinn, Estonia	Azerbaijan	2–1	3–1	2024–25 UEFA Nations League

== Honours ==
=== Club ===
Flora

- Meistriliiga: 2019
