= Jorginho (footballer, born June 1998) =

Portuguese footballer

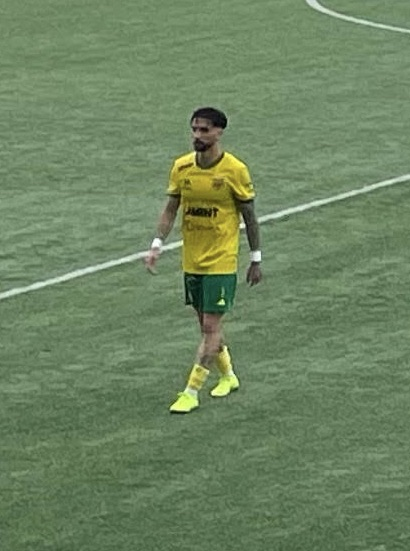
- Jorginho with Ilves in 2024

Personal information
- Full name: Ricardo Jorge Silva Araújo
- Date of birth: 27 June 1998 (age 28)
- Place of birth: Vila Nova de Famalicão, Portugal
- Height: 1.76 m (5 ft 9 in)
- Position: Left-back

Team information
- Current team: KuPS
- Number: 30

Youth career
- 2006–2007: Famalicão
- 2007–2008: Operário Famalicão
- 2008–2010: CB Póvoa de Lanhoso
- 2010–2018: Benfica

Senior career*
Years	Team	Apps	(Gls)
2017–2020	Benfica B	1	(0)
2020–2022	Famalicão	0	(0)
2022–2023	Sporting da Covilhã	23	(0)
2023–2024	Ilves	30	(3)
2025	Dukla Prague	8	(0)
2025–2026	Torpedo Kutaisi	13	(0)
2026–	KuPS	3	(0)

International career
2013	Portugal U15	1	(0)
2013–2014	Portugal U16	9	(1)
2016	Portugal U18	2	(0)
2017	Portugal U19	2	(0)
- * Club domestic league appearances and goals as of 12 November 2026

Ricardo Jorge Silva Araújo (born 27 June 1998), also known as Jorginho, is a Portuguese professional footballer who plays as a left-back for Veikkausliiga club KuPS.

== Club career ==
After playing in his native Portugal for Benfica B, Famalicão and Sporting da Covilhã, Jorginho moved to Finland in July 2023 after signing with Ilves in the country's top tier Veikkausliiga. On 31 October 2024, it was reported that Jorginho would leave Ilves. During one-and-a-half seasons he spent with the club, he made 42 appearances, scored three goals and provided 12 assists in all competitions combined. He also won the 2023 Finnish Cup with Ilves, and they finished as the Veikkausliiga runners-up in the 2024 season.

On 13 November 2024, Jorginho signed a two-and-a-half-year contract with Czech First League club Dukla Prague as a free agent, joining the club in January 2025.

On 5 July 2025, Jorginho signed a contract with Erovnuli Liga club Torpedo Kutaisi.

On 17 July 2026, Jorginho joined Finnish Veikkausliiga club KuPS on a contract until the end of 2028.

== Career statistics ==
As of 8 December 2025

Appearances and goals by club, season and competition
Club	Season	League			Cup (Note: Includes Taça de Portugal and Suomen Cup)		Europe		Other		Total	
Club	Season	Division	Apps	Goals	Apps	Goals	Apps	Goals	Apps	Goals	Apps	Goals
Benfica B	2016–17	LigaPro	1	0	0	0	–		–		1	0
Benfica B	2017–18	LigaPro	0	0	0	0	–		–		0	0
Benfica B	2018–19	LigaPro	0	0	0	0	–		–		0	0
Benfica B	2019–20	LigaPro	0	0	0	0	–		–		0	0
Benfica B	Total		1	0	0	0	0	0	0	0	1	0
Famalicão	2020–21	Primeira Liga	0	0	0	0	–		–		0	0
Sporting da Covilhã	2022–23	Liga Portugal 2	23	0	1	0	–		3 (Note: Includes Taça da Liga)	0	27	0
Ilves	2023	Veikkausliiga	10	2	2	0	–		0	0	12	2
Ilves	2024	Veikkausliiga	20	1	1	0	4 (Note: Includes UEFA Conference League)	0	5 (Note: Includes Finnish League Cup)	0	30	1
Ilves	Total		30	3	3	0	4	0	5	0	42	3
Dukla Prague	2024–25	Czech First League	8	0	1	0	–		–		9	0
Dukla Prague B	2024–25	ČFL	1	0	–		–		–		1	0
Torpedo Kutaisi	2025	Erovnuli Liga	13	0	0	0	3 (Note: Appearances in UEFA Conference League qualifiers)	–		16	0	
Career total			76	3	5	0	7	0	8	0	96	3

== Honours ==
Benfica

- UEFA Youth League runner-up: 2016–17

Ilves

- Finnish Cup: 2023
- Veikkausliiga runner-up: 2024
