= Jiří Lerch =

Czech footballer and coach

Personal information
- Date of birth: 17 October 1971 (age 55)
- Place of birth: Czechoslovakia
- Position: Midfielder

Senior career*
Years	Team	Apps	(Gls)
1990–1991	Dukla Prague		
1991–1992	České Budějovice		
1992–2002	Slavia Prague		

International career
1992–1993	Czechoslovakia U21	15	(2)
1995–1997	Czech Republic	3	(0)

Managerial career
- 2010–2011: České Budějovice B
- 2011–2022: České Budějovice (assistant)
- 2022: České Budějovice (interim)
- 2022–2023: České Budějovice (assistant)
- 2023–2024: České Budějovice
- 2025: České Budějovice
- 2025–2026: Vysočina Jihlava
Medal record
SK Slavia Prague
Winner	Czech First League	1995–96
- * Club domestic league appearances and goals

Jiří Lerch (born 17 October 1971) is a Czech football coach and former player. He made 233 appearances in the Czech First League and its predecessor, scoring eight goals. He won the Czech First League in 1995–96 with Slavia. He played 15 times for Czechoslovakia U21, scoring 2 goals from 1992 to 1993. He played three times for the Czech Republic, making his debut against Slovakia on 8 May 1995.

On 13 December 2023, Lerch was appointed caretaker head coach and on 15 January 2024, Lerch was appointed head coach of Dynamo České Budějovice.

On 12 January 2025, Lerch was appointed head coach of Dynamo České Budějovice again.

On 15 October 2025, Lerch was appointed head coach of Vysočina Jihlava.
