= Štěpán Šebrle =

Czech footballer (born 2002)

Personal information
- Date of birth: 4 September 2002 (age 24)
- Place of birth: Prague, Czech Republic
- Height: 1.78 m (5 ft 10 in)
- Position: Midfielder

Team information
- Current team: Dukla Prague

Youth career
- Aritma Prague
- –2021: Dukla Prague

Senior career*
Years	Team	Apps	(Gls)
2021–	Dukla Prague	139	(12)
2026	→ Viktoria Žižkov (loan)	3	(0)
- * Club domestic league appearances and goals as of 00:15 (UTC) 26 May 2026

Štěpán Šebrle (born 4 September 2002) is a Czech professional footballer. He plays as a midfielder for Dukla Prague.

== Career ==
From the age of nine years-old, he was a part of the FK Dukla Prague football team having started at SK Aritma Prague. At the age of eighteen, he signed a professional contract and made his debut in the first team. He helped the club gain promotion to the Czech First League in 2024, and in the August of that year signed a new three-year contract with the club. That month, he scored his first goal in the top flight for the club, in a 3–0 win over Dynamo České Budějovice.

On 13 January 2026, Šebrle joined FK Viktoria Žižkov on a half-year loan deal.

== Personal life ==
He was born in Prague on 4 September 2002. He is the son of 2004 Olympic Games champion decathlete Roman Šebrle and his wife Eva Kasalová, a middle-distance runner. His sister Kateřina also played football, for Slavia Prague and the Czech women's under-17 national team.
