= Vlastimil Daníček =

Czech footballer (born 1991)

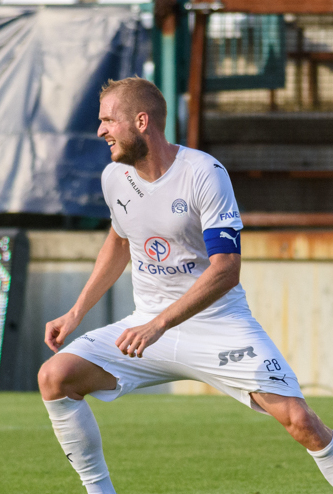
- Daníček in 2020

Personal information
- Date of birth: 15 July 1991 (age 35)
- Place of birth: Czechoslovakia
- Position: Midfielder

Senior career*
Years	Team	Apps	(Gls)
2009–2026	1. FC Slovácko	352	(39)
2014–2015	→ MFK Karviná (loan)	23	(0)

International career^{‡}
2006–2007	Czech Republic U16	4	(0)
2012	Czech Republic U21	6	(0)
- * Club domestic league appearances and goals as of 25 May 2026 ‡ National team caps and goals as of 27 October 2012

Vlastimil Daníček (born 15 July 1991) is a Czech former football player who last played for Slovácko. He has represented the Czech Republic at youth level.
