= Daniel Holzer =

Czech footballer (born 1995)

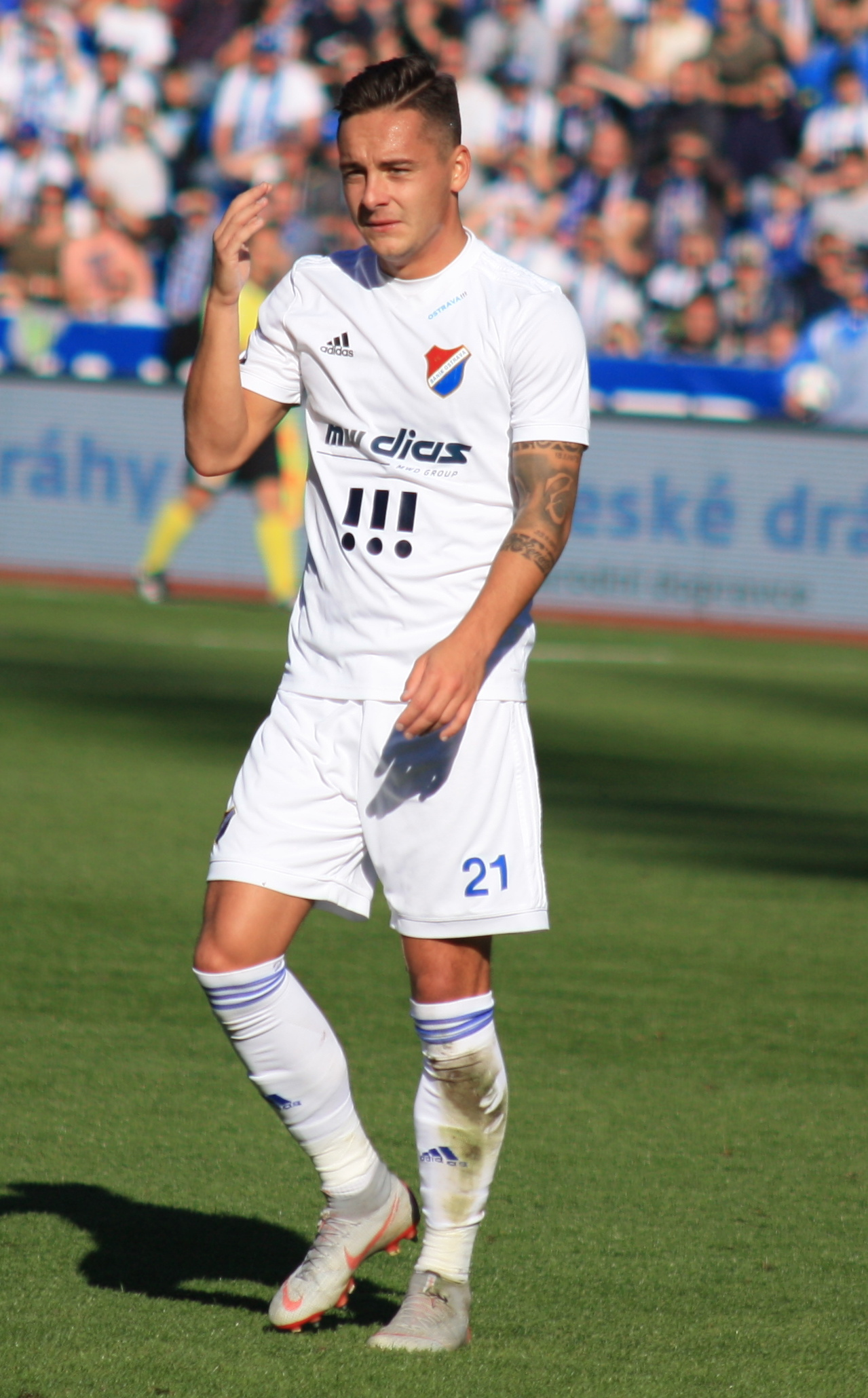
- Daniel Holzer in Baník Ostrava jersey in 2018

Personal information
- Full name: Daniel Holzer
- Date of birth: 18 August 1995 (age 31)
- Place of birth: Ostrava, Czech Republic
- Height: 1.75 m (5 ft 9 in)
- Positions: Left back; left midfielder

Team information
- Current team: Baník Ostrava
- Number: 95

Youth career
- Baník Ostrava

Senior career*
| Years | Team | Apps | (Gls) |
| 2012–2016 | Baník Ostrava | 69 | (6) |
| 2016–2018 | Sparta Prague | 13 | (1) |
| 2017–2018 | → Zlín (loan) | 27 | (2) |
| 2018–2021 | Baník Ostrava | 69 | (2) |
| 2021–2024 | Slovácko | 83 | (8) |
| 2024– | Baník Ostrava | 52 | (0) |

International career
| 2011 | Czech Republic U16 | 14 | (0) |
| 2011–2012 | Czech Republic U17 | 15 | (1) |
| 2013 | Czech Republic U18 | 7 | (3) |
| 2013–2014 | Czech Republic U19 | 13 | (3) |
| 2014–2015 | Czech Republic U20 | 4 | (2) |
| 2014–2017 | Czech Republic U21 | 16 | (1) |
- * Club domestic league appearances and goals as of 25 May 2026

Daniel Holzer (born 18 August 1995) is a Czech professional footballer who plays for Baník Ostrava.

He made his professional debut on 19 August 2012 in a Czech First League match against FC Viktoria Plzeň.
