= Milan Petržela =

Czech footballer

Personal information
- Date of birth: 19 June 1983 (age 43)
- Place of birth: Hoštice-Heroltice, Czechoslovakia
- Height: 1.75 m (5 ft 9 in)
- Position: Winger

Youth career
- 1988–1993: TJ Hoštice-Heroltice
- 1993–1995: Drnovice
- 1995–1996: SK Rostex Vyškov
- 1996–1999: Zeman Brno
- 1999–2001: Drnovice

Senior career*
Years	Team	Apps	(Gls)
2001–2003	Drnovice	5	(0)
2003–2006	Slovácko	70	(3)
2006–2007	Sparta Prague	1	(0)
2006–2007	→ Jablonec (loan)	24	(1)
2007–2012	Viktoria Plzeň	118	(22)
2012–2013	FC Augsburg	12	(0)
2013	FC Augsburg II	3	(0)
2013–2019	Viktoria Plzeň	147	(17)
2019–2025	Slovácko	157	(17)
2025	Viktoria Žižkov	14	(2)
2025–2026	Slovácko	18	(1)
Total		579	(63)

International career
2003	Czech Republic U20	6	(0)
2004–2005	Czech Republic U21	14	(0)
2010–2016	Czech Republic	19	(0)
- * Club domestic league appearances and goals

Milan Petržela (born 19 June 1983) is a Czech former professional footballer who played as a winger. With more than 530 appearances, he holds the record for the number of appearances in the Czech First League. He played for the Czech Republic national team, making 19 appearances.

== Career ==
Petržela grew up in the South Moravian village Hoštice-Heroltice.

In August 2003 he moved to 1. FC Slovácko of the Czech First League. There he played 70 games in three years and in the summer of 2006 he was bought by Sparta Prague. They however loaned him out to FK Jablonec where he made 24 appearances. He subsequently signed with Viktoria Plzeň, where he won the Czech Cup in 2010 and the Czech First League in 2011.

After an unsuccessful season with FC Augsburg, Petržela returned to Viktoria Plzeň in June 2013.

After leaving Viktoria Plzeň, Petržela returned to Slovácko in the summer of 2019, where he complimented the young staff brilliantly with his experience.

On 18 May 2022, Petržela started for Slovácko in the 2021–22 Czech Cup final, defeating Sparta Prague 3–1. Thanks to winning the cup, Slovácko qualified for the preliminary round of the 2022–23 UEFA Europa League, where they lost to Fenerbahçe, thus being relegated to the 2022–23 UEFA Europa Conference League, where on the fourth preliminary round, Slovácko was able to beat Sweden's AIK twice, hence qualifying for the group stage of a UEFA competition for the first time in its history.

On 15 September 2022, Petržela scored in a 4–2 loss to 1. FC Köln in their second ECL group stage match, and in doing so, at the age of 39 years and 89 days, he became the oldest goalscorer in the short history of the Europa Conference League, as well as the second-oldest goalscorer in any UEFA competition, only behind Joaquín, who scored in that same day in Europa League, aged 41 years and 56 days. Pepe has since overtaken him as well with a goal in the Champions League at the age of 40 years and 289 days.

On 6 November 2022, Petržela set a new Czech First League record with 465 appearances, when he surpassed Jaroslav Šilhavý with 464 appearances. In December 2023, the 40-year-old Petržela made his record-extending 500th start in the Czech First League.

On 13 January 2025, Petržela signed a contract with Czech National Football League club Viktoria Žižkov.

On 18 June 2025, Petržela joined his former club Slovácko again, in a role where he is intended to have a role on the field, but also off the field.

== Career statistics ==
As of 13 July 2024

Appearances and goals by club, season and competition
Club	Season	League			Cup		Continental		Other		Total	
Club	Season	Division	Apps	Goals	Apps	Goals	Apps	Goals	Apps	Goals	Apps	Goals
1. FC Slovácko	2003–04	Czech First League	20	1	0	0	0	0			20	1
1. FC Slovácko	2004–05	Czech First League	29	2	0	0	0	0			29	2
1. FC Slovácko	2005–06	Czech First League	21	0	0	0	0	0			21	0
1. FC Slovácko	Total		70	3	0	0	0	0	0	0	70	3
FK Jablonec (loan)	2006–07	Czech First League	24	1	0	0	0	0			24	1
Sparta Prague	2007–08	Czech First League	1	0	0	0	0	0			1	0
Viktoria Plzeň	2007–08	Czech First League	10	2	0	0	0	0			10	2
Viktoria Plzeň	2008–09	Czech First League	26	5	0	0	0	0			26	5
Viktoria Plzeň	2009–10	Czech First League	29	1	5	3	0	0			34	4
Viktoria Plzeň	2010–11	Czech First League	26	7	4	0	2	0	1 (Note: Appearance in Czech Supercup)	0	33	7
Viktoria Plzeň	2011–12	Czech First League	27	7	2	0	14	1	0	0	43	8
Viktoria Plzeň	Total		118	22	11	3	16	1	1	0	146	26
FC Augsburg	2012–13	Bundesliga	12	0	1	0	0	0	–		13	0
FC Augsburg II	2012–13	Regionalliga Bayern	3	0	–		–		–		3	0
Viktoria Plzeň	2013–14	Czech First League	26	6	7	0	16	2	1	0	50	8
Viktoria Plzeň	2014–15	Czech First League	27	3	4	0	2	0	1	0	34	3
Viktoria Plzeň	2015–16	Czech First League	27	3	6	0	9	2	1	0	43	5
Viktoria Plzeň	2016–17	Czech First League	23	2	1	0	9	0	–		33	2
Viktoria Plzeň	2017–18	Czech First League	24	2	2	0	13	2	–		39	4
Viktoria Plzeň	2018–19	Czech First League	20	1	2	0	6	0	2 (Note: Appearances in league play-offs)	0	30	1
Viktoria Plzeň	Total		147	17	22	0	55	6	5	0	229	23
1. FC Slovácko	2019–20	Czech First League	27	4	2	1	–		–		29	5
1. FC Slovácko	2020–21	Czech First League	33	5	1	0	–		–		34	5
1. FC Slovácko	2021–22	Czech First League	30	4	5	0	2	0	–		37	4
1. FC Slovácko	2022–23	Czech First League	30	3	2	0	9	2	–		41	5
1. FC Slovácko	2023–24	Czech First League	29	1	1	1	0	0	–		30	2
1. FC Slovácko	Total		149	17	11	2	11	2	0	0	171	21
Career total			524	60	45	5	82	9	6	0	657	74

== Honours ==
Viktoria Plzeň

- Czech First League: 2010–11
- Czech Cup: 2009–10
- Czech Republic Football Supercup: 2011

Slovácko

- Czech Cup: 2021–22
