= Petr Reinberk =

Czech footballer

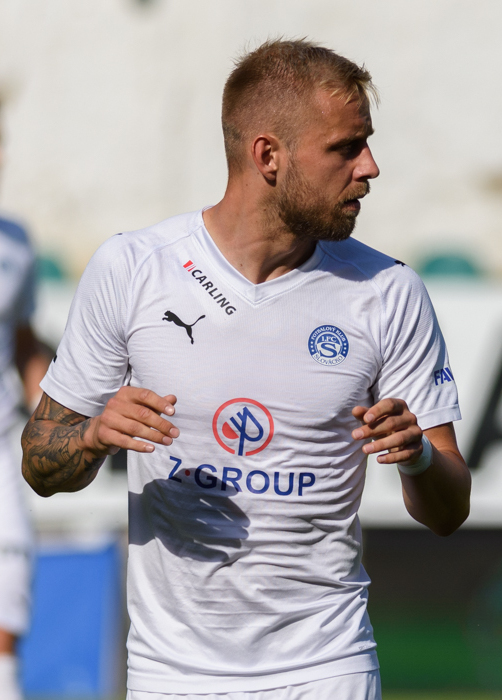
- Reinberk in 2020

Personal information
- Date of birth: 23 May 1989 (age 37)
- Place of birth: Czechoslovakia
- Height: 1.78 m (5 ft 10 in)
- Position: Midfielder

Senior career*
Years	Team	Apps	(Gls)
2008–2026	Slovácko	371	(12)
2009–2010	→ Vítkovice (loan)	25	(4)

International career^{‡}
2005	Czech Republic U16	5	(1)
2005–2006	Czech Republic U17	10	(0)
2006–2007	Czech Republic U18	10	(0)
2007–2008	Czech Republic U19	12	(0)
2009	Czech Republic U21	1	(0)
Medal record
Men's football
Representing Czech Republic
UEFA European Under-17 Championship
Runner-up	2006 Luxembourg
- * Club domestic league appearances and goals as of 25 May 2026 ‡ National team caps and goals as of 14 October 2011

Petr Reinberk (born 23 May 1989) is a Czech former football player who played for Slovácko.
