= Jan Peterka =

Czech footballer

Personal information
- Date of birth: 22 April 1990 (age 36)
- Height: 1.85 m (6 ft 1 in)
- Position: Midfielder

Team information
- Current team: Ústí nad Labem
- Number: 8

Youth career
- Teplice

Senior career*
| Years | Team | Apps | (Gls) |
| 2011–2020 | Ústí nad Labem | 226 | (7) |
| 2021–2026 | Dukla Prague | 135 | (11) |
| 2026– | Ústí nad Labem | 9 | (0) |
- * Club domestic league appearances and goals as of 28 May 2026

Jan Peterka (born 22 April 1990) is a Czech professional footballer who plays as a midfielder in the Czech National Football League for Ústí nad Labem. A youth player with Teplice, Peterka spent a decade with Ústí nad Labem before joining Dukla Prague in 2021.

== Club career ==
=== Ústí nad Labem ===
Peterka made his debut in the Czech National Football League for Ústí nad Labem in September 2011. Joining the game against Karviná as a second-half substitute, he scored an injury-time goal as Ústi won 4–2. Ústi went on to win the 2011–12 Czech 2. Liga, but were not promoted. In July 2014 he tore a thigh muscle, with the injury causing him to miss a number of weeks of the season. He scored his club's first goal of the 2019–20 season, finding the net in a 4–1 loss against Vyšehrad at Strahov in the second game of the campaign. Peterka stayed at the club for ten years, becoming the club captain. He made 226 league appearances, all in the Czech second tier, and scored 7 goals for the side.

=== Dukla Prague ===
Peterka joined Dukla Prague of the second league in February 2021, signing a three-year contract. He cited his desire to gain promotion as part of the reason behind the move. Dukla secured promotion to the First League in May 2024, with two matches remaining. Already the captain at the club, in July 2024 Peterka was among a number of Dukla players who extended their contracts with the Prague-based team. He scored his first Czech First League goal in May 2025 at the age of 35, scoring from a shot outside the penalty area in a 2–2 draw with Teplice, the side for which he played youth team football. Across two seasons, he made a total of 35 appearances in the Czech First League for Dukla, scoring three goals.

=== Return to Ústí nad Labem ===
On 2 February 2026, Peterka returned to Viagem Ústí nad Labem.

== Honours ==
Ústí nad Labem

- Czech National Football League: 2011–12

Dukla Prague

- Czech National Football League: 2023–24
