= Matúš Hruška =

Slovak footballer

Personal information
- Full name: Matúš Hruška
- Date of birth: 17 September 1994 (age 32)
- Place of birth: Žilina, Slovakia
- Height: 1.88 m (6 ft 2 in)
- Position: Goalkeeper

Team information
- Current team: Sigma Olomouc
- Number: 98

Youth career
- –2010: Žilina
- 2009–2010: → Púchov (loan)
- 2010–2013: Púchov
- 2012–2013: → Senica (loan)

Senior career*
Years	Team	Apps	(Gls)
2013	Púchov		
2014–2016	Myjava	44	(0)
2017–2020	Dukla Prague	25	(0)
2020–2024	Dukla B. Bystrica	109	(0)
2024–2025	Dukla Prague	34	(0)
2025–	Sigma Olomouc	2	(0)

International career^{‡}
2016	Slovakia U21	1	(0)
- * Club domestic league appearances and goals as of 4 February 2026 ‡ National team caps and goals as of 12 October 2020

Matúš Hruška (born 17 September 1994) is a Slovak professional footballer who plays for Sigma Olomouc.

== Club career ==
He made his professional debut for Spartak Myjava against FK Senica on 20 March 2015. Hruška joined Dukla Prague from Myjava in January 2017. He moved to Banská Bystrica on 22 September 2020 and made his debut one day later keeping a clean sheet in 3–0 win against MŠK Púchov. On 1 July 2024, Huška signed a contract with Dukla Prague. On 17 June 2025, Hruška signed a contract with Sigma Olomouc until 30 June 2027.
