= Filip Vecheta =

Czech footballer (born 2003)

- Vecheta with Jablonec in 2026

Personal information
- Date of birth: 15 February 2003 (age 23)
- Place of birth: Hollabrunn, Austria
- Height: 1.95 m (6 ft 5 in)
- Position: Forward

Team information
- Current team: Jablonec (on loan from Pardubice)
- Number: 27

Youth career
- 2009–2017: Znojmo
- 2017–2019: Slovácko

Senior career*
Years	Team	Apps	(Gls)
2019–2024	Slovácko	89	(7)
2019–2024	Slovácko B	51	(20)
2024–2025	Karviná	27	(13)
2025–	Pardubice	20	(3)
2026–	→ Jablonec (loan)	0	(0)

International career^{‡}
2018	Czech Republic U15	13	(8)
2018–2019	Czech Republic U16	15	(9)
2019	Czech Republic U17	4	(4)
2021–	Czech Republic U19	11	(6)
2022	Czech Republic U20	2	(3)
2022–	Czech Republic U21	9	(0)
- * Club domestic league appearances and goals as of 26 May 2026 ‡ National team caps and goals as of 14 November 2024

Filip Vecheta (born 15 February 2003) is a Czech professional footballer who plays as a forward for Czech First League club Jablonec, on loan from Pardubice.

== Club career ==
On 2 August 2024, Vecheta signed a contract with Karviná.

On 8 September 2025, Vecheta signed a multi-year contract with Pardubice.

On 16 July 2026, Vecheta joined Jablonec on a one-year loan deal.

== Career statistics ==
=== Club ===
As of 10 November 2021.

Club	Season	League			Cup		Continental		Other		Total	
Club	Season	Division	Apps	Goals	Apps	Goals	Apps	Goals	Apps	Goals	Apps	Goals
Slovácko	2018–19	Fortuna liga	1	0	0	0	–		0	0	1	0
Slovácko	2019–20	Fortuna liga	0	0	0	0	–		0	0	0	0
Slovácko	2020–21	Fortuna liga	0	0	0	0	–		0	0	0	0
Slovácko	2021–22	Fortuna liga	7	1	0	0	0	0	0	0	7	1
Total		8	1	0	0	0	0	0	0	8	1	
Slovácko B	2019–20	MSFL	4	1	–		–		0	0	4	1
Slovácko B	2020–21	MSFL	11	3	–		–		0	0	11	3
Slovácko B	2021–22	MSFL	4	6	–		–		0	0	4	6
Slovácko B	Total		19	10	0	0	0	0	0	0	19	10
Career total			27	11	0	0	0	0	0	0	27	11
