= Marek Havlík =

Czech footballer (born 1995)

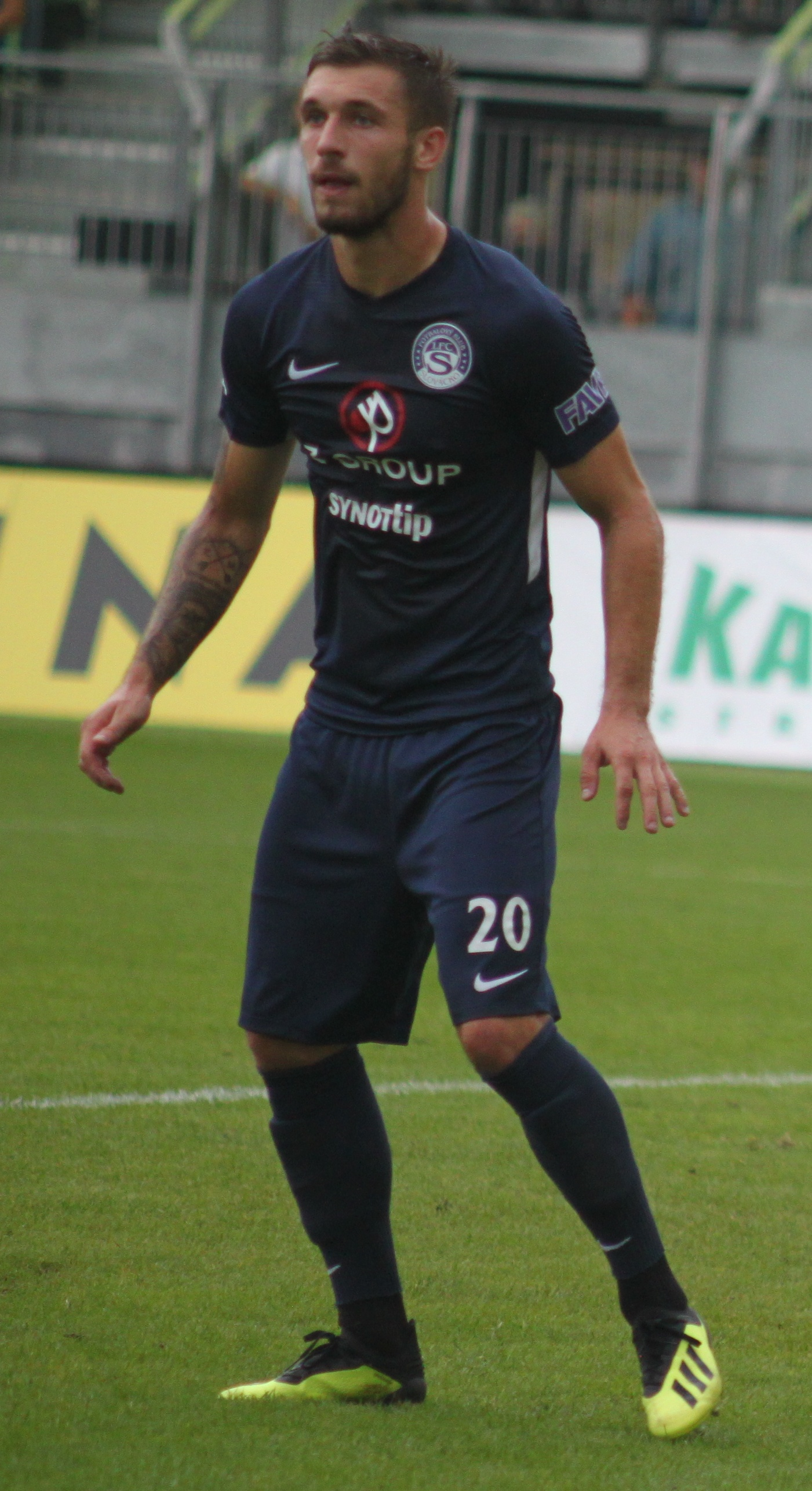

Personal information
- Date of birth: 8 July 1995 (age 31)
- Place of birth: Lubná, Czech Republic
- Height: 1.76 m (5 ft 9 in)
- Position: Midfielder

Team information
- Current team: 1. FC Slovácko
- Number: 20

Youth career
- SK Hanácká Slavia Kroměříž

Senior career*
Years	Team	Apps	(Gls)
2012–2013	SK Hanácká Slavia Kroměříž		
2013	→ 1. FC Slovácko (loan)	1	(0)
2013–	1. FC Slovácko	391	(43)

International career^{‡}
2011	Czech Republic U16	1	(0)
2014–2015	Czech Republic U20	2	(0)
2015–2016	Czech Republic U21	12	(3)
2020	Czech Republic	1	(0)
- * Club domestic league appearances and goals as of 25 May 2026 ‡ National team caps and goals as of 21:15, 13 December 2020 (UTC)

Marek Havlík (born 8 July 1995) is a Czech professional footballer who plays as a midfielder for 1. FC Slovácko. He made one appearance for the Czech Republic national football team in September 2020, playing 80 minutes of a match against Scotland.

== Career statistics ==
=== International ===
As of 7 September 2020

Czech Republic
Year	Apps	Goals
2020	1	0
Total	1	0
