= Městský fotbalový stadion Miroslava Valenty =

Football stadium in Uherské Hradiště

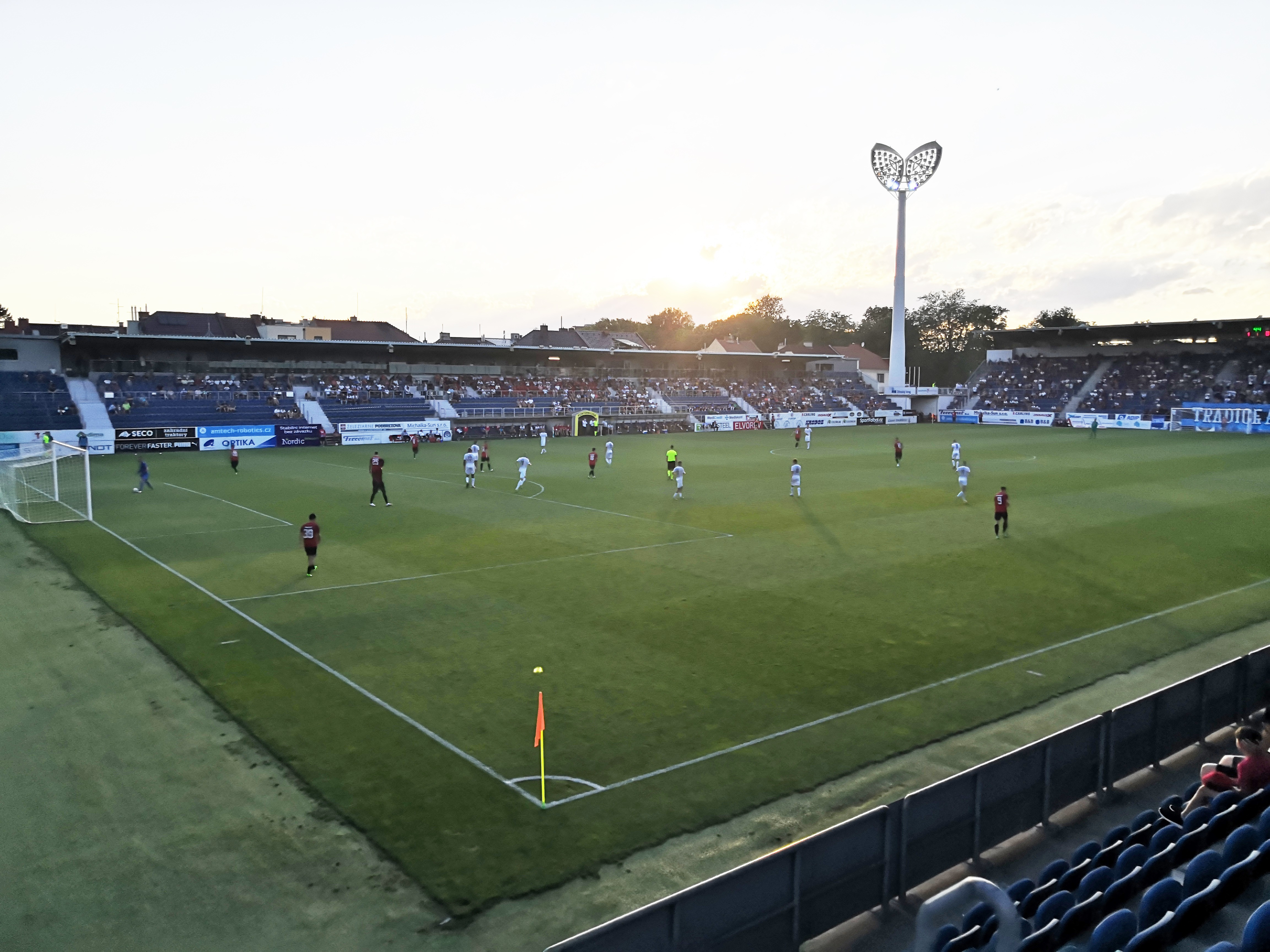
- Interactive map of Městský fotbalový stadion Miroslava Valenty
- Location: Stonky 566, Uherské Hradiště, Czech Republic, 686 01
- Coordinates: 49°03′56″N 17°28′17″E
- Owner: Town of Uherské Hradiště
- Capacity: 8,121
- Field size: 105x68m

Construction
- Opened: 2003
- Cost: 251 million CZK

Tenants
- 1. FC Slovácko (2003–present); 1. FC Slovácko (women); Czech Republic national football team (selected matches)

Městský fotbalový stadion Miroslava Valenty (transl. Miroslav Valenta Municipal Football Stadium) is a multi-use stadium in Uherské Hradiště, Czech Republic. It is used mostly for football matches and is the home ground of 1. FC Slovácko. The stadium has an all-seated capacity of 8,121 people.

The first match to take place at the stadium was a friendly match on 12 October 2003, with Slovácko hosting German side Borussia Mönchengladbach. The hosts won 3–2.

During the 2003–04 Czech First League, Synot played their home games for the first part of the season at Brno and Drnovice. Their first home league match at the stadium was on 18 October 2003 against Olomouc.

In August 2009, it was announced that the stadium would be renamed after the 2008 death of benefactor Miroslav Valenta.

== International matches ==
Městský fotbalový stadion Miroslava Valenty has hosted three full internationals of the Czech national team.

16 August 2006

Czech Republic	1–3	Serbia
Štajner 3'	(Report)	Lazović 41'; Pantelić 54'; Trišović 70'

International Friendly
Attendance: 8,047
Referee: Dietmar Drabek (Austria)

9 September 2009

Czech Republic	7–0	San Marino
Baroš 28', 44', 45+3' (pen.), 66'; Svěrkoš 47', 90+4'; Necid 86'	(Report)

2010 FIFA World Cup qualification (UEFA)
Attendance: 8,121
Referee: Arman Amirkhanyan (Armenia)

6 September 2018

Czech Republic	1–2	Ukraine
Schick 4'	(Report)	Konoplyanka 45+1'; Zinchenko 90+3'

2018–19 UEFA Nations League B
Attendance: 7,974
Referee: Anthony Taylor (England)
