= 2019–20 SK Slavia Prague season =

Slavia Prague
2019–20 season
- President: Jaroslav Tvrdík
- Head coach: Jindřich Trpišovský
- Stadium: Eden Arena
- Czech First League: 1st
- Czech Cup: Fourth round
- Champions League: Group stage
- Top goalscorer: League: Tomáš Souček (8); All: Tomáš Souček (10)
- Highest home attendance: 19,370 vs Borussia Dortmund (2 October 2019); 19,370 vs Internazionale (27 November 2019); 19,370 vs Sparta Prague (8 March 2020)
- Lowest home attendance: 252 vs Slovan Liberec (10 August 2019)
- Average home league attendance: 10,673 (8 July 2020)
Home colours	Away colours

The 2019–20 season was SK Slavia Prague's 27th season in the Czech First League. Slavia successfully defended their domestic title, winning the Czech First League for the sixth time, whilst in the Czech Cup they were knocked out in the Fourth Round by Baník Ostrava. In the UEFA Champions League, Slavia finished bottom of their group, which included Internazionale, Borussia Dortmund and Barcelona, with 2 points.

== Season events ==
On 11 March it was announced that Slavia would play their next two matches, away to Mladá Boleslav on Saturday 14 March and at home to Jablonec on Saturday 21 March, without fans, due to the COVID-19 pandemic.

On 12 March 2020, the League Football Association announced that all Fortuna liga games had been postponed for the foreseeable future due to the COVID-19 pandemic.

After 2 months, on 12 May, the League Football Association announced that the Fortuna liga would resume on 25 May.

On 19 May, Slavia announced that one of their players had tested positive for COVID-19, with their friendly match later in the day against Vysočina Jihlava being cancelled as a result.

On 7 June, Slavia gathered a point against Plzeň (match-week 28), which was sufficient to be mathematically assured that the team will finish ahead of Sparta in the league table.

=== Transfers ===
On 17 June, Slavia announced the signing of Tomáš Holeš and David Hovorka from Jablonec on a contracts until the summer of 2023.

On 4 July, Slavia announced the signing of Nicolae Stanciu on a four-year contract from Al-Ahli.

On 11 August, Slavia announced the signing of Oscar Dorley on a four-year contract from Slovan Liberec, with the midfielder staying in Liberec until the end of 2019.

On 2 September, Slavia announced the signing of Lukáš Provod on loan from Viktoria Plzeň, with the transfer becoming permanent in the winter with Provod signing a contract until the summer of 2024.

On 6 September, Slavia announced the signing of João Felipe on a four-year contract from Palmeiras.

=== New contracts ===
On 17 June, Tomáš Souček signed a new contract with Slavia, until the summer of 2024.

On 13 February, Ondřej Kolář signed a new contract with Slavia until the summer of 2024.

== Squad ==
As of 14 February 2020

Note: Flags indicate national team as defined under FIFA eligibility rules; some limited exceptions apply. Players may hold more than one non-FIFA nationality.

No.	Pos.	Nation	Player
1	GK	CZE	Ondřej Kolář
2	DF	CZE	David Hovorka
3	DF	CZE	Tomáš Holeš
4	DF	CIV	Mohamed Tijani (on loan from Vysočina Jihlava)
5	DF	CZE	Vladimír Coufal
6	DF	CZE	David Zima (on loan from Olomouc)
7	MF	ROU	Nicolae Stanciu
9	MF	NGR	Peter Olayinka
11	FW	CZE	Stanislav Tecl
13	MF	CZE	Patrik Hellebrand
15	DF	CZE	Ondřej Kúdela
17	MF	CZE	Lukáš Provod
18	DF	CZE	Jan Bořil
19	MF	LBR	Oscar Dorley

No.	Pos.	Nation	Player
20	FW	BRA	João Felipe
23	MF	CZE	Petr Ševčík
24	DF	CZE	Laco Takács
25	DF	CZE	Michal Frydrych
26	MF	CZE	Lukáš Červ
27	MF	CIV	Ibrahim Traoré
28	MF	CZE	Lukáš Masopust
29	FW	BHR	Abdulla Yusuf Helal
30	GK	CZE	Jakub Markovič
31	GK	CZE	Přemysl Kovář
32	DF	CZE	Daniel Kosek
33	FW	CRO	Petar Musa
34	GK	CZE	Jan Sirotník

=== Out on loan ===
Note: Flags indicate national team as defined under FIFA eligibility rules; some limited exceptions apply. Players may hold more than one non-FIFA nationality.

No.	Pos.	Nation	Player
10	MF	CZE	Josef Hušbauer (at Dynamo Dresden)
12	DF	CZE	Jaroslav Zelený (at Mladá Boleslav)
14	FW	NED	Mick van Buren (at ADO Den Haag)
22	MF	CZE	Tomáš Souček (at West Ham United)
—	GK	CZE	Martin Otáhal (at Slavoj Vyšehrad)
—	GK	SVK	Martin Vantruba (at Pohronie)
—	DF	CZE	Libor Drozda (at Slavoj Vyšehrad)
—	DF	CZE	Jakub Jugas (at Jablonec)
—	DF	CZE	Vojtěch Mareš (at Slavoj Vyšehrad)

No.	Pos.	Nation	Player
—	DF	CZE	Lukáš Pokorný (at Bohemians 1905)
—	DF	CZE	Tomáš Vlček (at Ústí nad Labem)
—	MF	CZE	Jan Matoušek (at Jablonec)
—	MF	CZE	Jan Sýkora (at Jablonec)
—	MF	CZE	Matěj Valenta (at Ústí nad Labem)
—	MF	CZE	Jan Vejvar (at Slavoj Vyšehrad)
—	MF	CZE	Lukáš Veselý (at Slavoj Vyšehrad)
—	MF	ROU	Alexandru Băluță (at Slovan Liberec)
—	FW	CZE	Jan Kuchta (at Slovan Liberec)

== Transfers ==
=== In ===
Date	Position	Nationality	Name	From	Fee	Ref.
17 June 2019	DF	(Czech Republic)	Tomáš Holeš	Jablonec	Undisclosed	
17 June 2019	DF	(Czech Republic)	David Hovorka	Jablonec	Undisclosed	
4 July 2019	MF	(Romania)	Nicolae Stanciu	Al-Ahli	Undisclosed	
11 August 2019	MF	(Liberia)	Oscar Dorley	Slovan Liberec	Undisclosed	
2 September 2019†	FW	(Czech Republic)	Lukáš Provod	Viktoria Plzeň	Undisclosed	
6 September 2019	FW	(Brazil)	João Felipe	Palmeiras	Undisclosed	
20 December 2019	DF	(Czech Republic)	Laco Takács	Mladá Boleslav	Undisclosed	
5 January 2020	MF	(Czech Republic)	Patrik Hellebrand	1. FC Slovácko	Undisclosed	

† Provod's moves were announced on the above date, but becoming official on 1 January 2020.

=== Loans in ===
Date from	Position	Nationality	Name	From	Date to	Ref.
2 September 2019	FW	(Czech Republic)	Lukáš Provod	Viktoria Plzeň	31 December 2019	
2 September 2019	DF	(Czech Republic)	Laco Takács	Mladá Boleslav	20 December 2019	
2 September 2019	FW	(Czech Republic)	Jakub Hora	Teplice	31 December 2019	
1 February 2020	DF	(Czech Republic)	David Zima	Sigma Olomouc	End of Season	
10 February 2020	DF	(Ivory Coast)	Mohamed Tijani	Vysočina Jihlava	End of Season	

=== Out ===
Date	Position	Nationality	Name	To	Fee	Ref.
29 June 2019	MF	(Slovakia)	Miroslav Stoch	PAOK	Undisclosed	
9 July 2019	DF	(Czech Republic)	Matěj Chaluš	Slovan Liberec	Undisclosed	
10 July 2019	DF	(Ivory Coast)	Simon Deli	Club Brugge	Undisclosed	
15 July 2019	MF	(Austria)	Jonas Auer	Mladá Boleslav	Undisclosed	
20 July 2019	DF	(Cameroon)	Michael Ngadeu-Ngadjui	KAA Gent	Undisclosed	
6 August 2019	MF	(Czech Republic)	Jaromír Zmrhal	Brescia	Undisclosed	
29 August 2019	MF	(Czech Republic)	Alex Král	Spartak Moscow	Undisclosed	
1 January 2020	MF	(Croatia)	Marko Alvir	Viktoria Plzeň	Undisclsoed	
11 January 2020	FW	(Slovakia)	Milan Škoda	Çaykur Rizespor	Undisclsoed	
17 January 2020	FW	(Bosnia and Herzegovina)	Imad Rondić	Slovan Liberec	Undisclsoed	
27 January 2020	MF	(Czech Republic)	Ondřej Žežulka	Viktoria Žižkov	Undisclosed	
27 February 2020	DF	(Czech Republic)	Václav Pardubský	Sokol Brozany	Undisclosed	

=== Loans out ===
Date from	Position	Nationality	Name	To	Date to	Ref.
Summer 2019	GK	(Czech Republic)	Martin Otáhal	Slavoj Vyšehrad	End of Season	
Summer 2019	DF	(Czech Republic)	Libor Drozda	Slavoj Vyšehrad	End of Season	
Summer 2019	DF	(Czech Republic)	Vojtěch Mareš	Slavoj Vyšehrad	End of Season	
Summer 2019	DF	(Czech Republic)	Václav Pardubský	Slavoj Vyšehrad	31 December 2019	
Summer 2019	DF	(Czech Republic)	Tomáš Vlček	Ústí nad Labem	End of Season	
Summer 2019	MF	(Croatia)	Marko Alvir	1. FK Příbram	31 December 2019	
Summer 2019	MF	(Czech Republic)	Tomáš Freit	Slavoj Vyšehrad	31 December 2019	
Summer 2019	MF	(Czech Republic)	Matěj Valenta	Ústí nad Labem	End of Season	
Summer 2019	MF	(Czech Republic)	Jan Vejvar	Slavoj Vyšehrad	End of Season	
Summer 2019	MF	(Czech Republic)	Lukáš Veselý	Slavoj Vyšehrad	End of Season	
Summer 2019	MF	(Czech Republic)	Ondřej Žežulka	Slavoj Vyšehrad	31 December 2019	
Summer 2019	MF	(Croatia)	Petar Musa	Slovan Liberec	End of Season	
18 June 2019	DF	(Czech Republic)	Jakub Jugas	Jablonec	End of Season	
18 June 2019	MF	(Czech Republic)	Jan Matoušek	Jablonec	End of Season	
18 June 2019	MF	(Czech Republic)	Jan Sýkora	Jablonec	End of Season	
9 July 2019	FW	(Czech Republic)	Jan Kuchta	Slovan Liberec	End of Season	
30 July 2019	GK	(Slovakia)	Martin Vantruba	Pohronie	17 January 2020	
30 July 2019	DF	(Czech Republic)	Lukáš Pokorný	Bohemians 1905	End of Season	
11 August 2019	MF	(Liberia)	Oscar Dorley	Slovan Liberec	31 December 2019	
5 September 2019	MF	(Romania)	Alexandru Băluță	Slovan Liberec	End of Season	
4 January 2020	MF	(Slovakia)	Jakub Hromada	Slovan Liberec	End of Season	
12 January 2020	FW	(Netherlands)	Mick van Buren	ADO Den Haag	End of Season	
14 January 2020	MF	(Czech Republic)	Josef Hušbauer	Dynamo Dresden	End of Season	
17 January 2020	GK	(Slovakia)	Martin Vantruba	1. FK Příbram	End of Season	
29 January 2020	MF	(Czech Republic)	Tomáš Souček	West Ham United	End of Season	
14 February 2020	DF	(Czech Republic)	Jaroslav Zelený	Mladá Boleslav	End of Season	

=== Released ===
Date	Position	Nationality	Name	Joined	Date
Summer 2019	MF	(Turkmenistan)	Ruslan Mingazow	Irtysh Pavlodar	23 July 2019
31 December 2019	MF	(Czech Republic)	Tomáš Freit		

== Pre-season and friendlies ==
Win Draw Loss Cancelled

26 June 2019	Slavia Prague	0–2	Dynamo České Budějovice	Čelákovice
18:30 CEST (UTC+02:00)		Report	Ledecký 21'; Kladrubský 42' (pen.); Mareček (yellow card) 66'; P.Čavoš (yellow card)	Attendance: 1,750

30 June 2019	Slovan Bratislava (Slovakia)	3–2	(Czech Republic) Slavia Prague	Bratislava, Slovakia
18:00 CEST (UTC+02:00)	Moha 24'; Šporar 45'; Dražić (yellow card) 52', (goal) 69'	Report	Souček (yellow card) 29', (goal) 53', 59'	Stadium: Tehelné pole Attendance: 5,950

2 July 2019	Austria Wien	2–3	(Czech Republic) Slavia Prague	Großpetersdorf, Austria
18:30 CEST (UTC+02:00)	Edomwonyi 14'; Sax 51'	Report	Frydrych 11' van Buren 27'; Holeš 52'

6 July 2019 Czech-Slovak Supercup	Spartak Trnava (Slovakia)	0–3	(Czech Republic) Slavia Prague	Trnava, Slovakia
18:00 CEST (UTC+02:00)	Tavares (yellow card) 46'; Lovat (yellow card) 53'; Mitrea (yellow card) 53'; Turňa (yellow card) 75'	Report	Kúdela (yellow card) 36'; Souček 40' (pen.), 61'; Masopust (yellow card) 53'; Hušbauer 71'	Stadium: Anton Malatinský Stadium; Attendance: 7,523; Referee: Ivan Kružliak

10 July 2019	Viktoria Žižkov	0–6	Slavia Prague	Prague
17:00 CEST (UTC+02:00)		Report	van Buren 2'; Coufal 10'; Helal 36'; Băluță (penalty missed) 63' 86'; Stanciu 64'; Holeš 87'	Stadium: Stadion SK Prosek

5 September 2019	Slavia Prague	5–3	Chrudim	Čelákovice
17:00 CEST (UTC+02:00)	Holeš 18'; Hora 28'; Tecl 34', 56'; Škoda 50' (pen.)	Report	Vašulín 67'; Krčál 77'; Rybička 83'	Stadium: Městský stadion

22 January 2020	Slavia Prague	0–1	Ústí nad Labem	Prague
13:30 CET (UTC+01:00)		Report	M.Bílek 79'	Stadium: Stadion Evžena Rošického

25 January 2020	Slavia Prague	3–3	Dynamo České Budějovice	Prague
13:30 CET (UTC+01:00)	Dorley 62'; Stanciu 70', 76'	Report	M.Mrsic 29'; Polom 72'; Schranz 88'	Stadium: Stadion Evžena Rošického; Referee: Jiří Musil

1 February 2020 Atlantic Cup	Slavia Prague (Czech Republic)	3–3 (2–4 p)	(Denmark) AGF	Albufeira, Portugal
14:00 CET (UTC+01:00)	Musa 48', 54'; D.Kosek 60'	Report	Ankersen 4', 49'; Mortensen 33'	Stadium: Estádio Municipal De Albufeira; Referee: José Salema
	Penalties
	Hellebrand (penalty missed); Musa (penalty scored); Boril (penalty scored); Cerv (penalty missed)		Helenius (penalty scored); Gersbach (penalty scored); Grønbæk (penalty scored); Juelsgård (penalty scored)

4 February 2020 Atlantic Cup	Slavia Prague (Czech Republic)	3–1	(Norway) Vålerenga	Algarve, Portugal
21:00 CET (UTC+01:00)	Masopust 8'; Tecl (yellow card) 45'; Zelený 81'; Coufal (yellow card) 89'; Provod 90'	Report	Vilhjálmsson 45' (pen.); Näsberg (yellow card) 45'	Stadium: Estádio Algarve; Referee: André Pereira

7 February 2020 Atlantic Cup	Slavia Prague (Czech Republic)	0–2	(Denmark) Brøndby	Albufeira, Portugal
13:00 CET (UTC+01:00)		Report	Mráz 51'; Tibbling 89'	Stadium: Estádio da Nora; Referee: Flavio Lima

8 February 2020	Slavia Prague (Czech Republic)	4–2	(Sweden) Hammarby	Lagos, Portugal
21:00 CET (UTC+01:00)	Stanciu 3'; Masopust 7'; Bořil 23'; Coufal 87'; Musa (yellow card) 90+4'	Report	Magyar (yellow card) 18'; Tanković 34'; Ludwigson 86'

19 May 2020	Slavia Prague	–	Vysočina Jihlava	Prague
16:00 CET (UTC+01:00)
Note: Match cancelled due to a Slavia Prague player testing positive for COVID-19.

== Competitions ==
=== Overall record ===
Competition	First match	Last match	Starting round	Final position	Record							
Competition	First match	Last match	Starting round	Final position	Pld	W	D	L	GF	GA	GD	Win %
Czech First League	15 July 2019	8 July 2020	Matchday 1	Winners	35	26	7	2	69	12	+57	74.29
Czech Cup	25 September 2019	30 October 2019	Third round	Fourth round	2	1	0	1	8	2	+6	50.00
UEFA Champions League	20 August 2019	10 December 2019	Play-off round	Group stage	6	0	2	4	6	10	−4	0.00
Total					43	27	9	7	83	24	+59	62.79

Source: Soccerway

=== Czech First League ===
==== Regular stage ====
===== League table =====
Pos	Team	Pld	W	D	L	GF	GA	GD	Pts	Qualification or relegation
1	Slavia Prague	30	22	6	2	58	10	+48	72	Qualification for the championship group
2	Viktoria Plzeň	30	20	6	4	60	22	+38	66	Qualification for the championship group
3	Sparta Prague	30	14	8	8	55	35	+20	50	Qualification for the championship group
4	Jablonec	30	14	7	9	46	41	+5	49	Qualification for the championship group
5	Slovan Liberec	30	14	5	11	50	38	+12	47	Qualification for the championship group

Source: Fortuna Liga
Rules for classification: 1) Points; 2) Head-to-head points; 3) Head-to-head goal difference; 4) Head-to-head goals scored; 5) Goal difference; 6) Goals scored; 7) Fair-play ranking; 8) Draw.

===== Results summary =====
Overall								Home						Away					
Pld	W	D	L	GF	GA	GD	Pts	W	D	L	GF	GA	GD	W	D	L	GF	GA	GD
30	22	6	2	59	10	+49	72	13	2	0	36	3	+33	9	4	2	23	7	+16

Last updated: 14 June 2020.
Source: See results

===== Results by round =====
Round	1	2	3	4	5	6	7	8	9	10	11	12	13	14	15	16	17	18	19	20	21	22	23	24	25	26	27	28	29	30
Ground	A	A	H	A	H	A	H	A	H	A	H	A	H	A	H	H	A	H	A	H	A	H	A	H	A	H	A	H	A	H
Result	W	W	W	D	W	W	W	D	W	W	W	W	W	W	W	W	D	W	W	W	L	W	L	D	W	W	W	D	D	W
Position	7	1	1	1	1	1	1	1	1	1	1	1	1	1	1	1	1	1	1	1	1	1	1	1	1	1	1	1	1	1

Source: See results
A = Away; H = Home; W = Win; D = Draw; L = Loss

===== Matches =====
15 July 2019 1	Fastav Zlín	0–1	Slavia Prague	Zlín
18:00 CEST (UTC+02:00)	Buchta (yellow card) 64'	Report	Hušbauer 69'	Stadium: Letná Stadion; Attendance: 5,898; Referee: Miroslav Zelinka

21 July 2019 2	Teplice	1–5	Slavia Prague	Teplice
19:00 CEST (UTC+02:00)	Mareš (yellow card) 23' (yellow-red card) 46'; Vondrášek 52'; Nazarov (yellow card) 66'	Report	Zmrhal 12'; Bořil (yellow card) 19' van Buren 20'; Hušbauer 44'; Hovorka (yellow card) 56'; Stanciu 67'; Souček 90+2'	Stadium: Na Stínadlech; Attendance: 13,112; Referee: Ondej Pechanec

28 July 2019 3	Slavia Prague	1–0	Sigma Olomouc	Prague
19:00 CEST (UTC+02:00)	Coufal 5'; Škoda (yellow card) 88'; Bořil (yellow card) 90+3'	Report	Greššák (yellow card) 51'; Jemelka (yellow card) 87'	Stadium: Sinobo Stadium; Attendance: 13,263; Referee: Zbynek Proske

4 August 2019 4	Karviná	0–0	Slavia Prague	Karviná
16:30 CEST (UTC+02:00)	Rundić (yellow card) 23'	Report	van Buren (yellow card) 27'	Stadium: Městský stadion Attendance: 4,126; Referee: Jan Machálek

10 August 2019 5	Slavia Prague	1–0	Slovan Liberec	Prague
19:30 CEST (UTC+02:00)	Masopust 38'; Hušbauer (yellow card) 72'; Coufal (yellow card) 75'	Report	Potočný (yellow card) 15'; Hybš (yellow card) 22'; Kacharaba (yellow card) 40'	Stadium: Sinobo Stadium; Attendance: 252; Referee: Emanuel Marek
Note: Match played behind closed doors with only away fans.

16 August 2019 6	Dynamo České Budějovice	0–3	Slavia Prague	České Budějovice
18:00 CEST (UTC+02:00)	Novák (yellow card) 36'; Táborský (yellow card) 89'	Report	Kúdela (yellow card) 17'; Stanciu 48'; Zelený (yellow card) 73'; Olayinka 76'; Škoda 84'	Stadium: Stadion Střelecký ostrov Attendance: 6,681; Referee: Pavel Julínek

24 August 2019 7	Slavia Prague	4–0	Bohemians 1905	Prague
19:30 CEST (UTC+02:00)	Hušbauer 9' (yellow card) 54'; Băluță (yellow card) 39'; Helal (yellow card) 45+1'; Frydrych 49'; Kúdela 56'; Traoré 90'	Report	Keita (yellow card) 30'; Vacek (yellow card) 42' (yellow-red card) 59'; Fryšták (yellow card) 50'; Ugwu (yellow card) 83'	Stadium: Sinobo Stadium; Attendance: 16,243; Referee: Pavel Rejžek

1 September 2019 8	Opava	1–1	Slavia Prague	Opava
16:30 CEST (UTC+02:00)	Svozil (red card) 13'; Simerský (yellow card) 36'; Šulc (yellow card) 73'; Zapalač (yellow card) 83'; Žídek 90+1'	Report	Olayinka 24'; Souček (yellow card) 82'	Stadium: Stadion v Městských sadech Attendance: 4,795; Referee: Ondej Berka

14 September 2019 9	Slavia Prague	3–0	Slovácko	Prague
19:00 CEST (UTC+02:00)	Hovorka (yellow card) 16'; Hušbauer 19'; Coufal 30'; Provod 78'	Report	Petržela (yellow card) 36'; Hofmann (yellow card) 42'; Reinberk (yellow card) 58'	Stadium: Sinobo Stadium; Attendance: 13,789; Referee: Pavel Franek

22 September 2019 10	Sparta Prague	0–3	Slavia Prague	Prague
18:00 CEST (UTC+02:00)	Kanga (yellow card) 43'; Tetteh (red card) 82'	Report	Souček 19' (pen.); Hušbauer (yellow card) 31' (yellow-red card) 66'; Masopust (yellow card) 40' (goal) 89'; Bořil (yellow card) 43'; Sáček 55' (o.g.); Hovorka (yellow card) 68'; Škoda (yellow card) 89'	Stadium: Stadion Letná; Attendance: 17,292; Referee: Miroslav Zelinka

28 September 2019 11	Slavia Prague	1–0	Mladá Boleslav	Prague
19:00 CEST (UTC+02:00)	Olayinka 14'; Hovorka (yellow card) 45+1'; Škoda (yellow card) 67'; Zelený (yellow card) 90+5'	Report	Matějovský (yellow card) 51'; Tatayev (yellow card) 59'	Stadium: Sinobo Stadium; Attendance: 18,079; Referee: Emanuel Marek

6 October 2019 12	Jablonec	0–2	Slavia Prague	Jablonec nad Nisou
18:00 CEST (UTC+02:00)	Kubista (yellow card) 18'; Doležal (yellow card) 81'	Report	Stanciu (yellow card) 24'; Bořil (yellow card) 60'; Souček 70'; Olayinka 73'	Stadium: Stadion Střelnice; Attendance: 4,863; Referee: Zbynek Proske

19 October 2019 13	Slavia Prague	3–1	1. FK Příbram	Prague
19:00 CEST (UTC+02:00)	Kúdela (yellow card) 29'; Souček 63' (pen.), 73'; Kodr 68' (o.g.)	Report	Škoda 31'; Cmiljanovic (yellow card) 40'; Dramé (yellow card) 84'	Stadium: Sinobo Stadium; Attendance: 16,437; Referee: Miroslav Zelinka

27 October 2019 14	Viktoria Plzeň	0–1	Slavia Prague	Plzeň
17:00 CET (UTC+01:00)	Kayamba (yellow card) 3'; Procházka (yellow card) 17'; Limberský (yellow card) 45'; Chorý (yellow card) 74'	Report	Olayinka (yellow card) 15'; Ševčík (yellow card) 49'; Hušbauer 50'; Hovorka (yellow card) 59'; Frydrych (yellow card) 83'; Traoré (yellow card) 88'	Stadium: Doosan Arena; Attendance: 11,625; Referee: Pavel Franek

2 November 2019 15	Slavia Prague	4–0	Baník Ostrava	Prague
17:00 CET (UTC+01:00)	Bořil (yellow card) 36'; Souček 43', 52'; Coufal (yellow card) 57'; Stanciu (yellow card) 57'; Tecl 68'; Ševčík 77'; Takács (yellow card) 90+1'	Report	Jirásek (yellow card) 11' (yellow-red card) 61'; Fillo (yellow card) 26'; Diop (yellow card) 46'; Fleišman (yellow card) 57'	Stadium: Sinobo Stadium; Attendance: 18,297; Referee: Toma Klíma

10 November 2019 16	Slavia Prague	3–0	Teplice	Prague
17:00 CET (UTC+01:00)	Souček 29' (pen.); Helal (yellow card) 53'; Ševčík 89'; Kúdela 90+2'	Report	J.Mareš (yellow card) 32'; Shejbal (yellow card) 45'; Paradin (yellow card) 90+1'	Stadium: Sinobo Stadium; Attendance: 16,271; Referee: Ondej Pechanec

23 November 2019 17	Sigma Olomouc	0–0	Slavia Prague	Olomouc
17:00 CET (UTC+01:00)	Hála (yellow card) 39'; Jemelka (yellow card) 42'; González (yellow card) 77'; Falta (yellow card) 90+2'	Report	Frydrych (yellow card) 20'; Coufal (yellow card) 39'; Masopust (red card) 44'; Takács (yellow card) 62'; Kúdela (yellow card) 82'	Stadium: Andrův stadion Attendance: 8,119; Referee: Pavel Rejžek

1 December 2019 18	Slavia Prague	2–0	Karviná	Prague
17:00 CET (UTC+01:00)	Olayinka (yellow card) 52'; Hušbauer (yellow card) 58'; Takács 63'; Škoda 90+3' (pen.)	Report	Ndefe (yellow card) 78'; Petkov (yellow card) 90'	Stadium: Sinobo Stadium; Attendance: 12,042; Referee: Radek Dubravsky

6 December 2019 19	Slovan Liberec	0–3	Slavia Prague	Liberec
19:30 CET (UTC+01:00)	Hybš (yellow card) 28'; Potočný (yellow card) 43'; Mikula (yellow card) 45+3'; Karafiát (yellow card) 63'; Fukala (yellow card) 90+2'	Report	Škoda 8'; Traoré 24'; Ševčík 73'	Stadium: Stadion u Nisy; Attendance: 5,326; Referee: Miroslav Zelinka

15 December 2019 20	Slavia Prague	4–1	Dynamo České Budějovice	Prague
17:00 CET (UTC+01:00)	Škoda 13', 58'; Coufal 19'; Masopust 28'	Report	Havelka (yellow card) 10'; Moses (yellow card) 41' (goal) 51'; Drobný (yellow card) 59'	Stadium: Sinobo Stadium; Attendance: 16,214; Referee: Pavel Franek

16 February 2020 21	Bohemians 1905	1–0	Slavia Prague	Prague
17:00 CET (UTC+01:00)	Pulkrab (yellow card) 62'; J.Vodháněl 70'; Nečas (yellow card) 80'	Report	Frydrych (yellow card) 64'; Provod (yellow card) 89'	Stadium: Ďolíček; Attendance: 6,277; Referee: Pavel Rejžek

22 February 2020 22	Slavia Prague	2–0	Opava	Prague
14:30 CET (UTC+01:00)	Musa 32'; Tecl 84'; Tijani (yellow card) 90+4'	Report	Hrabina (yellow card) 22'; Železník (yellow card) 72'; Rychlý (yellow card) 74'; Hnaníček (yellow card) 79'; Zapalač (yellow card) 90+2'	Stadium: Sinobo Stadium; Attendance: Ondej Ginzel; Referee: 16,319

1 March 2020 23	Slovácko	2–0	Slavia Prague	Uherské Hradiště
14:30 CET (UTC+01:00)	Kadlec (yellow card) 21'; Petržela 25'; Reinberk (yellow card) 80'; Zahustel 89'; Trmal (yellow card) 90+1'	Report	Olayinka (yellow card) 20'; Musa (yellow card) 63'	Stadium: Městský fotbalový stadion Miroslava Valenty; Attendance: 7,032; Referee: Ondej Berka

8 March 2020 24	Slavia Prague	1–1	Sparta Prague	Prague
17:00 CET (UTC+01:00)	Traoré (yellow card) 13'; Olayinka (yellow card) 32'; Musa 90+2' (yellow card) 90+3'; Bořil (yellow card) 90+4'	Report	Karabec (yellow card) 11'; Štetina (yellow card) 30'; Dočkal (yellow card) 68'; Tetteh 80'	Stadium: Sinobo Stadium; Attendance: 19,370; Referee: Pavel Franek

26 May 2020 25	Mladá Boleslav	0–1	Slavia Prague	Mladá Boleslav
20:00 CEST (UTC+02:00)	Mazuch (yellow card) 36'; Wágner (yellow card) 49'	Report	Stanciu (yellow card) 19'; Ševčík 22'	Stadium: Lokotrans Aréna; Attendance: 147; Referee: Miroslav Zelinka
Note: Match originally scheduled for 14 March, but postponed on 12 March due to the COVID-19 pandemic.

30 May 2020 26	Slavia Prague	5–0	Jablonec	Prague
20:00 CEST (UTC+02:00)	Stanciu 21' (pen.); Holeš 29'; Provod 56'; Tecl 61'; Helal 78' (pen.)	Report	Kratochvíl (yellow card) 26'; Dočekal (yellow card) 85'	Stadium: Sinobo Stadium; Attendance: 90; Referee: Pavel Královec
Note: Match originally scheduled for 22 March, but postponed on 12 March due to the COVID-19 pandemic.

2 June 2020 27	1. FK Příbram	0–1	Slavia Prague	Příbram
20:00 CEST (UTC+02:00)		Report	Musa 82'; Helal (yellow card) 90+1'; Hellebrand (yellow card) 90+5'	Stadium: Na Litavce; Attendance: 120; Referee: Ondej Pechanec
Note: Match originally scheduled for 6 April, but postponed on 12 March due to the COVID-19 pandemic.

7 June 2020 28	Slavia Prague	0–0	Viktoria Plzeň	Prague
19:00 CEST (UTC+02:00)	Provod (yellow card) 79'; Bořil (yellow card) 90+5'	Report	Hejda (yellow card) 27'; Řezník (yellow card) 60'; Kopic (yellow card) 84'; Chorý (yellow card) 90+1'	Stadium: Sinobo Stadium; Attendance: 150; Referee: Pavel Franek
Note: Match originally scheduled for 14 April, but postponed on 12 March due to the COVID-19 pandemic.

10 June 2020 29	Baník Ostrava	2–2	Slavia Prague	Ostrava
18:00 CEST (UTC+02:00)	Svozil 17'; Stronati (yellow card) 19' (goal) 90+7'; Procházka (yellow card) 59'; Potočný (yellow card) 61'; Jánoš (yellow card) 69'; Kaloč (yellow card) 70'; Jirásek (yellow card) 80' (yellow-red card) 87'; Fleišman (yellow card) 90+1'	Report	Stanciu 14'; Tecl (yellow card) 58' (yellow-red card) 90+6'; Zima (yellow card) 89'; Helal (yellow card) 90+2'; Masopust 90+4'	Stadium: Městský stadion Attendance: 0 Referee: Ondej Berka
Note: Match originally scheduled for 21 April, but postponed on 12 March due to the COVID-19 pandemic.

14 June 2020 30	Slavia Prague	1–0	Fastav Zlín	Prague
17:00 CEST (UTC+02:00)	Holeš (yellow card) 49'; Bořil (yellow card) 67'; Masopust 74'	Report	Chanturishvili (yellow card) 43'; Bačo (yellow card) 45'; Conde (yellow card) 45'; Bartošák (yellow card) 55'; Džafić (yellow card) 90+2'	Stadium: Sinobo Stadium; Attendance: 0 Referee: Petr Ardeleanu
Note: Match originally scheduled for 28 April, but postponed on 12 March due to the COVID-19 pandemic.

==== Championship group ====
===== League table =====
Pos	Team	Pld	W	D	L	GF	GA	GD	Pts	Qualification
1	Slavia Prague (C)	35	26	7	2	69	12	+57	85	Qualification for the Champions League play-off round
2	Viktoria Plzeň	35	23	7	5	68	24	+44	76	Qualification for the Champions League second qualifying round
3	Sparta Prague	35	17	9	9	66	40	+26	60	Qualification for the Europa League group stage
4	Jablonec	35	14	9	12	48	52	−4	51	Qualification for the Europa League second qualifying round
5	Slovan Liberec (O)	35	15	6	14	55	51	+4	51	Qualification for the Europa League play-offs final
6	Baník Ostrava	35	12	11	12	47	43	+4	47	

Rules for classification: 1) Total points; 2) Points earned in regular season; 3) Head-to-head points (regular season); 4) Head-to-head goal difference (regular season); 5) Head-to-head goals scored (regular season); 5) Goal difference (all matches); 6) Goals scored (all matches); 7) Fair-play ranking; 8) Draw.
(C) Champions; (O) Play-off winners

===== Results summary =====
Overall								Home						Away					
Pld	W	D	L	GF	GA	GD	Pts	W	D	L	GF	GA	GD	W	D	L	GF	GA	GD
5	4	1	0	11	2	+9	13	2	1	0	5	0	+5	2	0	0	6	2	+4

Last updated: 8 July 2020.
Source: See results

===== Results by round =====
Round	1	2	3	4	5
Ground	A	H	H	A	H
Result	W	W	W	W	D
Position	1	1	1	1	1

Source: See results
A = Away; H = Home; W = Win; D = Draw; L = Loss

===== Matches =====
20 June 2020 1	Baník Ostrava	1–3	Slavia Prague	Ostrava
20:00 CEST (UTC+02:00)	Jirásek (yellow card) 32'; Kuzmanović (yellow card) 85'; Buchta 90'; Fleišman (yellow card) 90+4'	Report	Zima 13'; Ševčík (yellow card) 20'; Bořil 43'; Musa (yellow card) 88' (goal) 90+2'	Stadium: Městský stadion Attendance: 1,722; Referee: Pavel Královec

24 June 2020 2	Slavia Prague	1–0	Viktoria Plzeň	Prague
20:00 CEST (UTC+02:00)	Ševčík 69'	Report	Chorý (yellow card) 18'; Kalvach (yellow card) 31'; Hořava (yellow card) 90+3'	Stadium: Sinobo Stadium; Attendance: 3,500; Referee: Miroslav Zelinka

28 June 2020 3	Slavia Prague	4–0	Jablonec	Prague
19:00 CEST (UTC+02:00)	Musa 8', 58'; Ševčík 34'; Takács (yellow card) 54'; Dorley (yellow card) 71'; Masopust 86'	Report	Krob (yellow card) 23'; Štěpánek (yellow card) 60'	Stadium: Sinobo Stadium; Attendance: 2,800; Referee: Ondrej Lerch

5 July 2020 4	Slovan Liberec	1–3	Slavia Prague	Liberec
17:00 CEST (UTC+02:00)	Pešek (yellow card) 38'; Králíček 80'	Report	Traoré 34'; Helal 45'; Musa 49' (yellow card) 74'	Stadium: Stadion u Nisy; Attendance: 2,488; Referee: Pavel Franek

8 July 2020 5	Slavia Prague	0–0	Sparta Prague	Prague
18:00 CEST (UTC+02:00)	Bořil (yellow card) 27'; Stanciu (yellow card) 67'; Masopust (yellow card) 78'	Report	Štetina (yellow card) 27'; Dočkal (yellow card) 29'; Kozák (yellow card) 46'; Krejčí (yellow card) 67'	Stadium: Sinobo Stadium; Attendance: 4,700; Referee: Ondej Berka

=== Czech Cup ===
25 September 2019 Third round	Slavia Prague	8–0	Slavoj Vyšehrad	Prague
16:00 CEST (UTC+02:00)	Škoda 16', 29', 40', 43' van Buren 21'; Frydrych 54'; Zelený 59'; João Felipe 87'	Report	J.Vejvar (red card) 52'; A.Alexandr (yellow card) 85'	Stadium: FK Viktoria Stadion; Attendance: 2,543; Referee: Toma Klíma

30 October 2019 Fourth round	Baník Ostrava	2–0 (a.e.t.)	Slavia Prague	Ostrava
17:00 CET (UTC+01:00)	Jirásek (yellow card) 34'; Fleišman (yellow card) 60'; Diop 102' (yellow card) 102'; Smola 116'; Granečný (yellow card) 118'	Report	Traoré (yellow card) 61'; Frydrych (yellow card) 99'; Helal (yellow card) 113'	Stadium: Městský Stadion

=== UEFA Champions League ===
==== Qualifying rounds ====
===== Play-off round =====
20 August 2019 First leg	CFR Cluj (Romania)	0–1	(Czech Republic) Slavia Prague	Cluj-Napoca, Romania
21:00 CEST (UTC+02:00)	Djoković (yellow card) 31'; Bordeianu (yellow card) 45'; Burcă (yellow card) 70'; Omrani (penalty missed) 79'	Report	Masopust 28'; Coufal (yellow card) 43'; Souček (yellow card) 87'; Škoda (yellow card) 90+2'	Stadium: Dr. Constantin Rădulescu; Attendance: 15,196; Referee: Cüneyt Çakır (Turkey)

28 August 2019 Second leg	Slavia Prague (Czech Republic)	1–0 (2–0 agg.)	(Romania) CFR Cluj	Prague, Czech Republic
21:00 CEST (UTC+02:00)	Masopust (yellow card) 40'; Kúdela (yellow card) 47'; Bořil 66'	Report	Mureșan (yellow card) 40'; Deac (yellow card) 44'; Țucudean (yellow card) 80'; Djoković (yellow card) 90+5'	Stadium: Sinobo Stadium; Attendance: 18,562; Referee: Gianluca Rocchi (Italy)

==== Group stage ====
Pos	Team	Pld	W	D	L	GF	GA	GD	Pts	Qualification
1	(Spain) Barcelona	6	4	2	0	9	4	+5	14	Advance to knockout phase
2	(Germany) Borussia Dortmund	6	3	1	2	8	8	0	10	Advance to knockout phase
3	(Italy) Inter Milan	6	2	1	3	10	9	+1	7	Transfer to Europa League
4	(Czech Republic) Slavia Prague	6	0	2	4	4	10	−6	2	

Source: UEFA
Rules for classification: Group stage tiebreakers

17 September 2019 1	Internazionale (Italy)	1–1	(Czech Republic) Slavia Prague	Milan, Italy
18:55 CEST (UTC+02:00)	Asamoah (yellow card) 54'; Martínez (yellow card) 66'; Politano (yellow card) 83'; Barella 90+2'	Report	Hovorka (yellow card) 40'; Olayinka 63'; Souček (yellow card) 90+1'	Stadium: San Siro; Attendance: 50,128; Referee: Ruddy Buquet (France)

2 October 2019 2	Slavia Prague (Czech Republic)	0–2	(Germany) Borussia Dortmund	Prague, Czech Republic
18:55 CEST (UTC+02:00)	Ševčík (yellow card) 45'; Hovorka (yellow card) 50'	Report	Piszczek (yellow card) 22'; Hakimi 35', 89'	Stadium: Sinobo Stadium; Attendance: 19,370; Referee: Björn Kuipers (Netherlands)

23 October 2019 3	Slavia Prague (Czech Republic)	1–2	(Spain) Barcelona	Prague, Czech Republic
21:00 CEST (UTC+02:00)	Bořil 50', (yellow card) 64'; Masopust (yellow card) 56'; Olayinka (yellow card) 71'; Ševčík (yellow card) 76'	Report	Messi 3'; Alba (yellow card) 35'; Olayinka 57' (o.g.); Dembélé (yellow card) 90+5'	Stadium: Sinobo Stadium; Attendance: 19,170; Referee: Bobby Madden (Scotland)

5 November 2019 4	Barcelona (Spain)	0–0	(Czech Republic) Slavia Prague	Barcelona, Spain
18:55 CET (UTC+01:00)	Piqué (yellow card) 14'; Semedo (yellow card) 32'; Busquets (yellow card) 43'	Report	Olayinka (yellow card) 21'; Stanciu (yellow card) 48'; Hušbauer (yellow card) 82'; Kúdela (yellow card) 84'; Kolář (yellow card) 90+3'	Stadium: Camp Nou; Attendance: 67,023; Referee: Michael Oliver (England)

27 November 2019 5	Slavia Prague (Czech Republic)	1–3	(Italy) Internazionale	Prague, Czech Republic
21:00 CET (UTC+01:00)	Souček 37' (pen.); Kúdela (yellow card) 52'	Report	Vecino (yellow card) 12'; Martínez 19', 88' (yellow card) 24'; Lukaku 81'	Stadium: Sinobo Stadium; Attendance: 19,370; Referee: Szymon Marciniak (Poland)

10 December 2019 6	Borussia Dortmund (Germany)	2–1	(Czech Republic) Slavia Prague	Dortmund, Germany
21:00 CET (UTC+01:00)	Sancho 10'; Brandt (yellow card) 38' (goal) 61'; Zagadou (yellow card) 49'; Weigl (yellow card) 66' (yellow-red card) 77'	Report	Bořil (yellow card) 42'; Souček 43'; Coufal (yellow card) 82'	Stadium: Westfalenstadion; Attendance: 65,079; Referee: Sergei Karasev (Russia)

== Squad statistics ==
As of match played 8 July 2020

=== Appearances and goals ===
No.	Pos	Nat	Player	Total		HET liga		MOL Cup		Champions League	
No.	Pos	Nat	Player	Apps	Goals	Apps	Goals	Apps	Goals	Apps	Goals
1	GK	(Czech Republic) CZE	Ondřej Kolář	40	0	31	0	1	0	8	0
2	DF	(Czech Republic) CZE	David Hovorka	14	0	9	0	0	0	5	0
3	DF	(Czech Republic) CZE	Tomáš Holeš	18	1	12+3	1	2	0	0+1	0
4	DF	(Ivory Coast) CIV	Mohamed Tijani	2	0	2	0	0	0	0	0
5	DF	(Czech Republic) CZE	Vladimír Coufal	41	3	32	3	0+1	0	8	0
6	DF	(Czech Republic) CZE	David Zima	12	1	12	1	0	0	0	0
7	MF	(Romania) ROU	Nicolae Stanciu	40	4	25+6	4	0+1	0	8	0
9	MF	(Nigeria) NGR	Peter Olayinka	28	5	17+3	4	0	0	8	1
11	FW	(Czech Republic) CZE	Stanislav Tecl	28	3	14+9	3	0+2	0	1+2	0
13	MF	(Czech Republic) CZE	Patrik Hellebrand	10	0	2+8	0	0	0	0	0
15	DF	(Czech Republic) CZE	Ondřej Kúdela	39	2	30	2	1	0	8	0
17	FW	(Czech Republic) CZE	Lukáš Provod	24	2	14+6	2	2	0	0+2	0
18	DF	(Czech Republic) CZE	Jan Bořil	36	3	28	1	0	0	8	2
19	MF	(Liberia) LBR	Oscar Dorley	6	0	3+3	0	0	0	0	0
20	FW	(Brazil) BRA	João Felipe	2	1	0+1	0	0+1	1	0	0
23	MF	(Czech Republic) CZE	Petr Ševčík	30	6	22+2	6	1	0	5	0
24	MF	(Czech Republic) CZE	Laco Takács	15	1	9+4	1	0	0	1+1	0
25	DF	(Czech Republic) CZE	Michal Frydrych	28	2	13+10	1	2	1	2+1	0
26	MF	(Czech Republic) CZE	Lukáš Červ	1	0	0+1	0	0	0	0	0
27	MF	(Ivory Coast) CIV	Ibrahim Traoré	32	3	13+12	3	1	0	3+3	0
28	MF	(Czech Republic) CZE	Lukáš Masopust	36	7	21+6	6	1	0	8	1
29	FW	(Bahrain) BHR	Abdulla Yusuf Helal	22	2	6+11	2	0+2	0	0+3	0
30	GK	(Czech Republic) CZE	Jakub Markovič	3	0	2	0	1	0	0	0
31	GK	(Czech Republic) CZE	Přemysl Kovář	2	0	2	0	0	0	0	0
32	DF	(Czech Republic) CZE	Daniel Kosek	2	0	1	0	1	0	0	0
33	FW	(Croatia) CRO	Petar Musa	14	7	7+7	7	0	0	0	0
Players away from Slavia Prague on loan:
10	MF	(Czech Republic) CZE	Josef Hušbauer	24	5	18	5	1	0	2+3	0
12	DF	(Czech Republic) CZE	Jaroslav Zelený	13	1	5+2	0	2	1	1+3	0
14	FW	(Netherlands) NED	Mick van Buren	19	2	6+8	1	2	1	1+2	0
20	MF	(Romania) ROU	Alexandru Băluță	1	0	1	0	0	0	0	0
22	MF	(Czech Republic) CZE	Tomáš Souček	25	10	17	8	0	0	8	2
26	MF	(Slovakia) SVK	Jakub Hromada	1	0	0	0	1	0	0	0
Players who left Slavia Prague during the season:
8	MF	(Czech Republic) CZE	Jaromír Zmrhal	3	1	3	1	0	0	0	0
21	FW	(Czech Republic) CZE	Milan Škoda	19	9	5+9	5	1	4	2+2	0
32	FW	(Czech Republic) CZE	Jakub Hora	6	0	1+3	0	2	0	0	0
33	MF	(Czech Republic) CZE	Alex Král	8	0	2+4	0	0	0	1+1	0

=== Goal scorers ===
Place	Position	Nation	Number	Name	HET liga	MOL Cup	Champions League	Total
1	MF	(Czech Republic)	22	Tomáš Souček	8	0	2	10
2	FW	(Czech Republic)	21	Milan Škoda	5	4	0	9
3	FW	(Croatia)	33	Petar Musa	7	0	0	7
3	MF	(Czech Republic)	28	Lukáš Masopust	6	0	1	7
5	MF	(Czech Republic)	23	Petr Ševčík	6	0	0	6
6	MF	(Czech Republic)	10	Josef Hušbauer	5	0	0	5
6	MF	(Nigeria)	9	Peter Olayinka	4	0	1	5
8	MF	(Romania)	7	Nicolae Stanciu	4	0	0	4
9	DF	(Czech Republic)	5	Vladimír Coufal	3	0	0	3
9	FW	(Czech Republic)	11	Stanislav Tecl	3	0	0	3
9	MF	(Ivory Coast)	27	Ibrahim Traoré	3	0	0	3
9	DF	(Czech Republic)	18	Jan Bořil	1	0	2	3
13	DF	(Czech Republic)	15	Ondřej Kúdela	2	0	0	2
13	FW	(Czech Republic)	17	Lukáš Provod	2	0	0	2
13	FW	(Bahrain)	29	Abdulla Yusuf Helal	2	0	0	2
13	FW	(Netherlands)	14	Mick van Buren	1	1	0	2
13	DF	(Czech Republic)	25	Michal Frydrych	1	1	0	2
13				Own goal	2	0	0	2
19	MF	(Czech Republic)	8	Jaromír Zmrhal	1	0	0	1
19	MF	(Czech Republic)	24	Laco Takács	1	0	0	1
19	DF	(Czech Republic)	3	Tomáš Holeš	1	0	0	1
19	DF	(Czech Republic)	6	David Zima	1	0	0	1
19	DF	(Czech Republic)	12	Jaroslav Zelený	0	1	0	1
19	FW	(Brazil)	18	João Felipe	0	1	0	1
				TOTALS	69	8	6	83

=== Clean sheets ===
Place	Position	Nation	Number	Name	HET liga	MOL Cup	Champions League	Total
1	GK	(Czech Republic)	1	Ondřej Kolář	23	0	3	26
2	GK	(Czech Republic)	30	Jakub Markovič	2	1	0	3
3	GK	(Czech Republic)	31	Přemysl Kovář	1	0	0	1
				TOTALS	26	1	3	30

=== Disciplinary record ===
Number	Nation	Position	Name	HET liga		MOL Cup		Champions League		Total	
Number	Nation	Position	Name	Yellow card	Red card	Yellow card	Red card	Yellow card	Red card	Yellow card	Red card
1	(Czech Republic)	GK	Ondřej Kolář	0	0	0	0	1	0	1	0
2	(Czech Republic)	DF	David Hovorka	5	0	0	0	2	0	7	0
3	(Czech Republic)	DF	Tomáš Holeš	1	0	0	0	0	0	1	0
4	(Ivory Coast)	DF	Mohamed Tijani	1	0	0	0	0	0	1	0
5	(Czech Republic)	DF	Vladimír Coufal	3	0	0	0	2	0	5	0
6	(Czech Republic)	DF	David Zima	1	0	0	0	0	0	1	0
7	(Romania)	MF	Nicolae Stanciu	4	0	0	0	1	0	5	0
9	(Nigeria)	MF	Peter Olayinka	4	0	0	0	2	0	6	0
11	(Czech Republic)	FW	Stanislav Tecl	2	1	0	0	0	0	2	1
13	(Czech Republic)	MF	Patrik Hellebrand	1	0	0	0	0	0	1	0
15	(Czech Republic)	DF	Ondřej Kúdela	3	0	0	0	3	0	6	0
17	(Czech Republic)	MF	Lukáš Provod	2	0	0	0	0	0	2	0
19	(Liberia)	MF	Oscar Dorley	1	0	0	0	0	0	1	0
18	(Czech Republic)	DF	Jan Bořil	9	0	0	0	2	0	11	0
23	(Czech Republic)	MF	Petr Ševčík	2	0	0	0	2	0	4	0
24	(Czech Republic)	MF	Laco Takács	3	0	0	0	0	0	3	0
25	(Czech Republic)	DF	Michal Frydrych	3	0	1	0	0	0	4	0
27	(Ivory Coast)	MF	Ibrahim Traoré	2	0	1	0	0	0	3	0
28	(Czech Republic)	MF	Lukáš Masopust	2	1	0	0	2	0	4	1
29	(Bahrain)	FW	Abdulla Yusuf Helal	4	0	1	0	0	0	5	0
33	(Croatia)	FW	Petar Musa	4	0	0	0	0	0	4	0
Players away on loan:
10	(Czech Republic)	MF	Josef Hušbauer	5	1	0	0	1	0	6	1
12	(Czech Republic)	DF	Jaroslav Zelený	2	0	0	0	0	0	2	0
14	(Netherlands)	FW	Mick van Buren	1	0	0	0	0	0	1	0
20	(Romania)	MF	Alexandru Băluță	1	0	0	0	0	0	1	0
22	(Czech Republic)	MF	Tomáš Souček	1	0	0	0	2	0	3	0
Players who left Slavia Prague during the season:
21	(Czech Republic)	FW	Milan Škoda	3	0	0	0	1	0	4	0
			TOTALS	70	3	3	0	21	0	94	3
