= Petr Ševčík =

Czech footballer (born 1994)

Personal information
- Date of birth: 4 May 1994 (age 32)
- Place of birth: Jeseník, Czech Republic
- Height: 1.72 m (5 ft 8 in)
- Position: Midfielder

Team information
- Current team: Zbrojovka Brno

Senior career*
| Years | Team | Apps | (Gls) |
| 2014–2016 | Sigma Olomouc | 13 | (0) |
| 2014–2015 | → Opava (loan) | 13 | (4) |
| 2016–2019 | Slovan Liberec | 59 | (2) |
| 2019–2026 | Slavia Prague | 109 | (8) |
| 2025 | → Jablonec (loan) | 12 | (2) |
| 2026– | Zbrojovka Brno | 0 | (0) |

International career^{‡}
| 2009–2010 | Czech Republic U16 | 4 | (0) |
| 2010 | Czech Republic U17 | 2 | (0) |
| 2012 | Czech Republic U18 | 5 | (1) |
| 2012–2013 | Czech Republic U19 | 14 | (1) |
| 2014–2015 | Czech Republic U20 | 6 | (0) |
| 2014–2017 | Czech Republic U21 | 7 | (1) |
| 2019– | Czech Republic | 17 | (0) |
- * Club domestic league appearances and goals as of 14 March 2026 ‡ National team caps and goals as of 17:41, 15 May 2026 (UTC)

Petr Ševčík (born 4 May 1994) is a Czech professional footballer who plays as a midfielder for Zbrojovka Brno and the Czech Republic national team. Having made his debut in the Czech First League in 2014, Ševčík has played most of his club football there, aside from the 2014–15 season, when he played in the second level.

== Life ==
Ševčík grew up in Supíkovice, where he also started to play football.

== Club career ==
At the end of the 2013–14 Czech First League season, Ševčík started his career at Sigma Olomouc and made debuted as a second-half substitute in a 5–0 away loss at Sparta Prague. When Olomouc was subsequently relegated, he joined Opava on a half-season loan at the start of the 2014–15 Czech National Football League.

In the spring part of the 2015–16 Czech First League, Ševčík scored his first two league goals for Olomouc, but the season culminated in Olomouc's relegation for the second time in three seasons. After the end of the season, he was one of two players who left Olomouc to transfer to Slovan Liberec alongside teammate Jan Navrátil, where Ševčík signed a three-year contract.

Ševčík played for Liberec for two and a half seasons. His performances there led to interest from Slavia Prague and Sparta Prague.

In January 2019, Ševčík moved to Slavia Prague. On 18 April 2019, Ševčík scored a brace in the away second leg of the Europa League quarter-finals against Chelsea.

On 29 January 2025, Ševčík joined Jablonec on a half-year loan deal.

On 5 June 2026, Ševčík signed a multi-year contract with Zbrojovka Brno.

== International career ==
In a UEFA Euro 2020 qualifying match against Kosovo on 14 November 2019, Ševčík debuted for the Czech senior squad, coming on as a substitute for Lukáš Masopust in the 76th minute. On 25 May 2021, he was selected in the Czech squad for the UEFA Euro 2020. On 12 June 2024, he was called up for the UEFA Euro 2024, replacing the injured Michal Sadílek.

== Career statistics ==
=== Club ===
As of 14 March 2026

Appearances and goals by club, season and competition
| Club | Season | League | | | Czech Cup | | Continental | | Other | | Total | |
| Club | Season | Division | Apps | Goals | Apps | Goals | Apps | Goals | Apps | Goals | Apps | Goals |
|---|---|---|---|---|---|---|---|---|---|---|---|---|
| Sigma Olomouc | 2013–14 | Czech First League | 1 | 0 | — | | — | | — | | 1 | 0 |
| Sigma Olomouc | 2014–15 | Czech National Football League | 1 | 0 | — | | — | | — | | 1 | 0 |
| Sigma Olomouc | 2015–16 | Czech First League | 12 | 2 | 2 | 0 | — | | — | | 14 | 2 |
| Sigma Olomouc | Total | | 14 | 2 | 2 | 0 | — | | — | | 16 | 2 |
| Opava (loan) | 2014–15 | Czech National Football League | 13 | 4 | 1 | 0 | — | | — | | 14 | 4 |
| Slovan Liberec | 2016–17 | Czech First League | 22 | 0 | 3 | 0 | 6 (Note: Appearances in UEFA Europa League) | 1 | — | | 31 | 1 |
| Slovan Liberec | 2017–18 | Czech First League | 20 | 1 | 2 | 0 | — | | — | | 22 | 1 |
| Slovan Liberec | 2018–19 | Czech First League | 17 | 1 | 2 | 2 | — | | — | | 19 | 3 |
| Slovan Liberec | Total | | 59 | 2 | 7 | 2 | 6 | 1 | — | | 72 | 5 |
| Slavia Prague | 2018–19 | Czech First League | 5 | 0 | 1 | 0 | 3 | 2 | — | | 9 | 2 |
| Slavia Prague | 2019–20 | Czech First League | 24 | 6 | 1 | 0 | 5 (Note: Appearances in UEFA Champions League) | 0 | 1 (Note: Appearance in Czech-Slovak Supercup) | 0 | 31 | 6 |
| Slavia Prague | 2020–21 | Czech First League | 15 | 0 | 4 | 1 | 10 (Note: Two appearances in UEFA Champions League, eight appearances in UEFA Europa League) | 0 | — | | 29 | 1 |
| Slavia Prague | 2021–22 | Czech First League | 16 | 1 | 1 | 0 | 7 (Note: One appearance in UEFA Champions League, seven appearances in UEFA Europa Conference League) | 0 | — | | 24 | 1 |
| Slavia Prague | 2022–23 | Czech First League | 18 | 0 | 2 | 0 | 6 (Note: Appearances in UEFA Europa Conference League) | 0 | — | | 26 | 0 |
| Slavia Prague | 2023–24 | Czech First League | 26 | 1 | 2 | 0 | 6 | 0 | — | | 34 | 1 |
| Slavia Prague | 2024–25 | Czech First League | 5 | 0 | 0 | 0 | 0 | 0 | — | | 5 | 0 |
| Slavia Prague | 2025–26 | Czech First League | 0 | 0 | 0 | 0 | — | | — | | 0 | 0 |
| Slavia Prague | Total | | 109 | 8 | 11 | 1 | 37 | 2 | 1 | 0 | 158 | 11 |
| Jablonec (loan) | 2024–25 | Czech First League | 12 | 2 | 2 | 0 | — | | — | | 14 | 2 |
| Career total | | | 207 | 18 | 23 | 3 | 43 | 3 | 1 | 0 | 274 | 24 |

=== International ===
As of match played 22 June 2024

Appearances and goals by national team and year
| National team | Year | Apps | Goals |
|---|---|---|---|
| Czech Republic | 2019 | 2 | 0 |
| Czech Republic | 2020 | 4 | 0 |
| Czech Republic | 2021 | 6 | 0 |
| Czech Republic | 2022 | 2 | 0 |
| Czech Republic | 2023 | 1 | 0 |
| Czech Republic | 2024 | 2 | 0 |
| Total | | 17 | 0 |

== Honours ==
Slavia Prague

- Czech First League: 2018–19, 2019–20, 2020–21,
- Czech Cup: 2018–19, 2020–21, 2022–23
- Czech-Slovak Supercup: 2019
