= David Hovorka =

Czech footballer

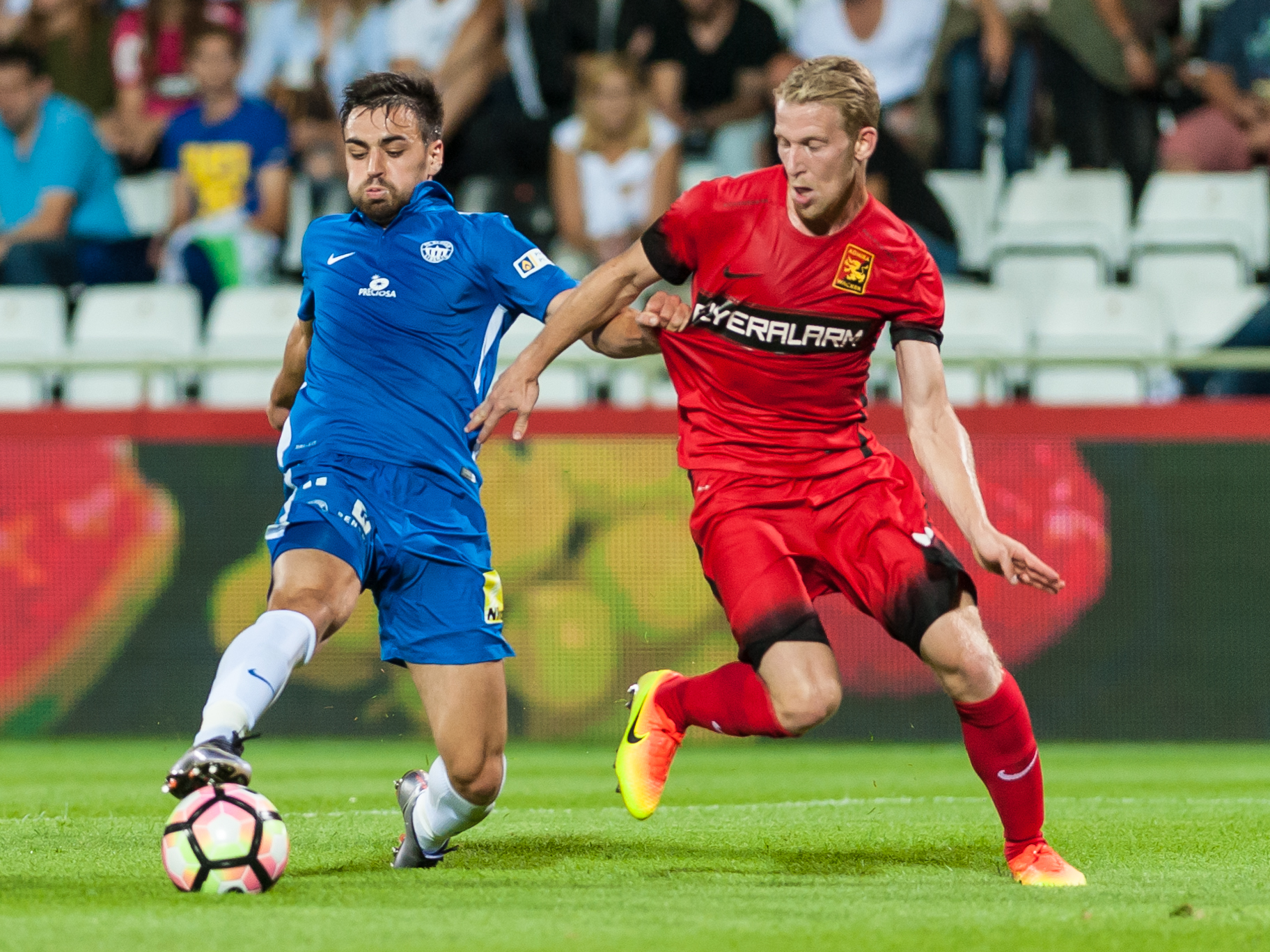
- Hovorka (in left) in action with Slovan Liberec in 2016

Personal information
- Date of birth: 7 August 1993 (age 33)
- Place of birth: Kladno, Czech Republic
- Height: 1.79 m (5 ft 10 in)
- Position: Defender

Youth career
- Kladno
- 2002–2012: Sparta Prague

Senior career*
Years	Team	Apps	(Gls)
2012–2015	Sparta Prague	0	(0)
2014	→ Hradec Králové (loan)	7	(0)
2014–2015	→ Viktoria Žižkov (loan)	29	(0)
2015–2017	Slovan Liberec	36	(3)
2017–2019	Sparta Prague	19	(1)
2018–2019	→ Jablonec (loan)	15	(1)
2019	Jablonec	14	(0)
2019–2022	Slavia Prague	25	(0)

International career
2020	Czech Republic	2	(0)
- * Club domestic league appearances and goals

David Hovorka (born 7 August 1993) is a retired professional Czech football defender. He played for four clubs in the Czech First League.

== Club career ==
Hovorka spent most of his youth career in Sparta Prague, arriving from SK Kročehlavy in 2002 at nine years old. He entered the first team squad in 2012, but failed to make a league appearance for the club.

=== Loan moves to Hradec Králové and Viktoria Žižkov ===
In January 2014, Hovorka moved to Czech National Football League team Hradec Králové on loan with an option to buy. He made his professional league debut on 21 March 2013 in a 1–1 away draw against České Budějovice. Hovorka appeared in only seven league matches, returning to Sparta at the end of the season.

In the 2014–15 season, he moved on another loan to fellow second-tier club, Viktoria Žižkov, for one year. He appeared in 29 league matches, scoring no goals.

=== Slovan Liberec ===
In summer 2015, Hovorka signed a three-year contract with the Czech First League side Liberec. He made his First League debut for them on 27 July in a 4–2 home win against Mladá Boleslav. He scored his first professional league goals on 11 May 2016 in a 4–3 home win against Zlín. With Liberec, he played in the Europa League group stage in two consecutive years.

=== Prague clubs and retirement ===
On 2 February 2017, it was announced that despite being seriously injured at the time, Hovorka rejoined his former club Sparta Prague. In 2018, he was sent on loan to Jablonec for one year.

In summer 2019, Hovorka moved to cross-city rivals SK Slavia Prague and was a starter in the UEFA Champions League match against Inter. He retired from professional football on 31 March 2023 due to lingering injury, having played his last match in May 2022.

== International career ==
Despite not playing for any youth national teams, Hovorka was called up to the Czech senior squad in August 2017 to face Germany and Northern Ireland in the 2018 FIFA World Cup qualification. He debuted on 7 October 2020 in a friendly match against Cyprus.

== Post-playing career ==
Since January 2024, Hovorka has worked as a mental health coach in the Sparta Prague youth academy.

== Career statistics ==
=== Club ===
As of 18 June 2022

Club	Season	League			Cup		Continental		Other		Total	
Club	Season	Division	Apps	Goals	Apps	Goals	Apps	Goals	Apps	Goals	Apps	Goals
Hradec Králové (loan)	2013–14	Czech National Football League	7	0	0	0	—		—		7	0
Viktoria Žižkov (loan)	2014–15	Czech National Football League	29	0	4	0	—		—		33	0
Slovan Liberec	2015–16	Czech First League	25	2	5	0	8	0	—		38	2
Slovan Liberec	2016–17	Czech First League	11	1	0	0	8	0	—		19	1
Slovan Liberec	Total		36	3	5	0	16	0	—		57	3
Sparta Prague	2016–17	Czech First League	0	0	0	0	—		—		0	0
Sparta Prague	2017–18	Czech First League	19	1	1	0	0	0	—		20	1
Sparta Prague	Total		19	1	0	0	0	0	—		20	1
Jablonec (loan)	2018–19	Czech First League	15	1	2	0	6	1	—		23	2
Jablonec	2018–19	Czech First League	14	0	—		—		—		14	0
Slavia Prague	2019–20	Czech First League	9	0	0	0	5	0	1	0	15	0
Slavia Prague	2020–21	Czech First League	8	0	1	1	4	0	—		13	1
Slavia Prague	2021–22	Czech First League	7	0	—		—		—		7	0
Slavia Prague	Total		24	0	1	1	9	0	1	0	35	1
Career total			144	5	13	1	31	1	1	0	189	7

== Honours ==
SK Slavia Prague

- Czech First League: 2019–20
