= 2023–24 SK Slavia Prague season =

Slavia Prague
2023–24 season
- President: Jaroslav Tvrdík
- Head coach: Jindřich Trpišovský
- Stadium: Fortuna Arena
- Czech First League: 2nd
- Czech Cup: Quarter-finals
- UEFA Europa League: Round of 16
- Top goalscorer: League: Václav Jurečka (19); All: Václav Jurečka (22)
- Average home league attendance: 17,710
| Home colours | Away colours |

The 2023–24 season was Sportovní klub Slavia Praha's 132nd season in existence and 31st consecutive in the Czech First League. They also competed in the Czech Cup and UEFA Europa League.

== Squad ==
As of match played 26 May 2024

| No. | Name | Nationality | Position | Date of birth (age) | Signed from | Signed in | Contract ends | Apps. | Goals |
Goalkeepers
| 1 | Ondřej Kolář | (Czech Republic) | GK | 17 October 1994 (aged 29) | Slovan Liberec | 2018 | | 220 | 1 |
| 28 | Aleš Mandous | (Czech Republic) | GK | 21 April 1992 (aged 32) | Sigma Olomouc | 2021 | 2026 | 76 | 0 |
| 31 | Jan Sirotník | (Czech Republic) | GK | 16 February 2002 (aged 22) | Academy | 2019 | 2025 | 0 | 0 |
| 36 | Jindřich Staněk | (Czech Republic) | GK | 27 April 1996 (aged 28) | Viktoria Plzeň | 2024 | | 14 | 0 |
Defenders
| 2 | Sheriff Sinyan | (The Gambia) | DF | 19 July 1996 (aged 27) | Molde | 2023 | 2024 | 5 | 0 |
| 3 | Tomáš Holeš | (Czech Republic) | DF | 31 March 1993 (aged 31) | Jablonec | 2019 | | 167 | 16 |
| 4 | David Zima | (Czech Republic) | DF | 8 November 2000 (aged 23) | Torino | 2024 | 2028 | 71 | 1 |
| 5 | Igoh Ogbu | (Nigeria) | DF | 8 February 2000 (aged 24) | Lillestrøm | 2023 | 2026 | 59 | 3 |
| 12 | El Hadji Malick Diouf | (Senegal) | DF | 28 December 2004 (aged 19) | Tromsø | 2024 | 2028 | 9 | 2 |
| 18 | Jan Bořil | (Czech Republic) | DF | 11 January 1991 (aged 33) | Mladá Boleslav | 2016 | | 231 | 13 |
| 27 | Tomáš Vlček | (Czech Republic) | DF | 28 February 2001 (aged 23) | Academy | 2019 | | 35 | 0 |
| 29 | Michal Tomič | (Slovakia) | DF | 30 March 1999 (aged 25) | 1. Slovácko | 2023 | | 30 | 2 |
| 31 | Ondřej Zmrzlý | (Czech Republic) | DF | 22 April 1999 (aged 25) | Sigma Olomouc | 2024 | | 14 | 3 |
Midfielders
| 6 | Conrad Wallem | (Norway) | MF | 9 June 2000 (aged 23) | Odd | 2023 | | 38 | 7 |
| 8 | Lukáš Masopust | (Czech Republic) | MF | 12 February 1993 (aged 31) | Jablonec | 2019 | | 195 | 24 |
| 10 | Christos Zafeiris | (Norway) | MF | 23 February 2003 (aged 21) | Haugesund | 2023 | 2027 | 57 | 5 |
| 16 | Boris Koffi | (Ivory Coast) | MF | 5 August 2005 (aged 18) | Academy | 2023 | | 1 | 0 |
| 17 | Lukáš Provod | (Czech Republic) | MF | 23 October 1996 (aged 27) | Viktoria Plzeň | 2020 | | 143 | 15 |
| 19 | Oscar Dorley | (Liberia) | MF | 19 July 1998 (aged 25) | Slovan Liberec | 2019 | | 168 | 5 |
| 21 | David Douděra | (Czech Republic) | MF | 31 May 1998 (aged 25) | Mladá Boleslav | 2022 | | 83 | 10 |
| 23 | Petr Ševčík | (Czech Republic) | MF | 2 May 1994 (aged 30) | Slovan Liberec | 2019 | | 152 | 11 |
| 24 | Bolu Ogungbayi | (Nigeria) | MF | 16 May 2004 (aged 20) | Academy | 2023 | | 6 | 0 |
| 35 | Matěj Jurásek | (Czech Republic) | MF | 30 August 2003 (aged 20) | Academy | 2021 | 2026 | 64 | 13 |
Forwards
| 9 | Muhamed Tijani | (Nigeria) | FW | 26 July 2000 (aged 23) | Baník Ostrava | 2023 | | 33 | 4 |
| 11 | Stanislav Tecl | (Czech Republic) | FW | 1 September 1990 (aged 33) | Jablonec | 2017 | | 187 | 40 |
| 13 | Mojmír Chytil | (Czech Republic) | FW | 29 April 1999 (aged 25) | Sigma Olomouc | 2023 | | 47 | 21 |
| 14 | Mick van Buren | (Netherlands) | FW | 24 August 1992 (aged 31) | Esbjerg | 2016 | | 160 | 27 |
| 15 | Václav Jurečka | (Czech Republic) | FW | 26 June 1994 (aged 29) | Slovácko | 2022 | 2025 | 78 | 47 |
| 26 | Ivan Schranz | (Slovakia) | FW | 13 September 1993 (aged 30) | Jablonec | 2021 | 2024 | 107 | 28 |
| 46 | Samuel Pikolon | (Czech Republic) | FW | 5 March 2006 (aged 18) | Academy | 2023 | | 1 | 0 |
Away on loan
| 4 | Aiham Ousou | (Syria) | DF | 9 January 2000 (aged 24) | BK Häcken | 2021 | 2026 | 73 | 2 |
| 22 | Andres Dumitrescu | (Romania) | DF | 11 March 2001 (aged 23) | Sepsi OSK | 2023 | | 8 | 0 |
| 25 | Jakub Hromada | (Slovakia) | MF | 25 May 1996 (aged 28) | Sampdoria | 2017 | | 105 | 3 |
| 32 | Ondřej Lingr | (Czech Republic) | MF | 7 October 1998 (aged 25) | Karviná | 2020 | | 138 | 40 |
| | Antonín Kinský | (Czech Republic) | GK | 13 March 2003 (aged 21) | Dukla Prague | 2021 | | 0 | 0 |
Players who left during the season
| 30 | Taras Kacharaba | (Ukraine) | DF | 7 January 1995 (aged 29) | Slovan Liberec | 2022 | 2024 | 78 | 2 |

== Transfers ==
=== In ===
| Pos. | Player | Transferred from | Fee | Date | Source |
|---|---|---|---|---|---|
| FW | (Nigeria) Muhamed Tijani | (Czech Republic) Baník Ostrava | €1,260,000 | 21 June 2023 | |
| FW | (Czech Republic) Mojmír Chytil | (Czech Republic) Sigma Olomouc | Undisclosed | 30 June 2023 | |
| MF | (Czech Republic) Filip Blecha | (Czech Republic) Zbrojovka Brno | Loan return | 30 June 2023 | |
| MF | (Nigeria) Ubong Ekpai | (Czech Republic) Mladá Boleslav | Loan return | 30 June 2023 | |
| DF | (Czech Republic) Denis Halinský | (Czech Republic) Vlašim | Loan return | 30 June 2023 | |
| GK | (Czech Republic) Antonín Kinský | (Czech Republic) Vyškov | Loan return | 30 June 2023 | |
| GK | (Czech Republic) Jakub Markovič | (Czech Republic) Pardubice | Loan return | 30 June 2023 | |
| MF | (Czech Republic) Jan Matoušek | (Czech Republic) Bohemians 1905 | Loan return | 30 June 2023 | |
| MF | (Serbia) Srđan Plavšić | (Czech Republic) Baník Ostrava | Loan return | 30 June 2023 | |
| MF | (Slovakia) Tomáš Rigo | (Czech Republic) Vlašim | Loan return | 30 June 2023 | |
| MF | (Senegal) Babacar Sy | (Czech Republic) Teplice | Loan return | 30 June 2023 | |
| DF | (Ukraine) Maksym Talovyerov | (Austria) LASK | Loan return | 30 June 2023 | |
| DF | (Slovakia) Michal Tomič | (Czech Republic) Mladá Boleslav | Loan return | 30 June 2023 | |
| MF | (Czech Republic) Matěj Valenta | (Czech Republic) Slovan Liberec | Loan return | 30 June 2023 | |
| DF | (Czech Republic) Tomáš Vlček | (Czech Republic) Pardubice | Loan return | 30 June 2023 | |
| DF | (The Gambia) Sheriff Sinyan | (Norway) Molde | Undisclosed | 4 July 2023 | |
| MF | (Norway) Conrad Wallem | (Norway) Odd | €1,500,000 | 5 July 2023 | |
| DF | (Romania) Andres Dumitrescu | (Romania) Sepsi OSK | €1,000,000 | 4 September 2023 | |
| MF | (Netherlands) Mohamed Ihattaren | —N/a | Undisclosed | 4 December 2023 | |
| DF | (Czech Republic) Ondřej Kričfaluši | (Czech Republic) Vlašim | Loan return | 31 December 2023 | |
| DF | (Syria) Aiham Ousou | (Sweden) Häcken | Loan return | 31 December 2023 | |
| DF | (Brazil) Eduardo Santos | (Brazil) RB Bragantino | Loan return | 31 December 2023 | |
| MF | (Nigeria) Moses Usor | (Austria) LASK | Loan return | 31 December 2023 | |
| MF | (Czech Republic) Matěj Valenta | (Czech Republic) Slovácko | Loan return | 31 December 2023 | |
| MF | (Czech Republic) Lukáš Červ | (Czech Republic) Slovan Liberec | | 4 January 2024 | |
| GK | (Czech Republic) Jindřich Staněk | (Czech Republic) Viktoria Plzeň | €1,000,000 | 5 January 2024 | |
| DF | (Czech Republic) Ondřej Zmrzlý | (Czech Republic) Sigma Olomouc | €1,000,000 | 5 January 2024 | |
| DF | (Senegal) El Hadji Malick Diouf | (Norway) Tromsø | €1,700,000 | 11 January 2024 | |
| DF | (Czech Republic) David Zima | (Italy) Torino | €4,000,000 | 31 January 2024 | |
| DF | (Ukraine) Maksym Talovyerov | (Austria) LASK | Loan return | 4 February 2024 | |

=== Out ===
| Pos. | Player | Transferred to | Fee | Date | Source |

== Competitions ==
=== Overall record ===
| Competition | First match | Last match | Starting round | Final position | Record | | | | | | | |
| Competition | First match | Last match | Starting round | Final position | Pld | W | D | L | GF | GA | GD | Win % |
|---|---|---|---|---|---|---|---|---|---|---|---|---|
| Czech First League | 22 July 2023 | 26 May 2024 | Matchday 1 | 2nd | 35 | 26 | 7 | 2 | 76 | 24 | +52 | 74.29 |
| Czech Cup | 27 September 2023 | 28 February 2024 | Third round | Quarter-finals | 3 | 2 | 0 | 1 | 6 | 3 | +3 | 66.67 |
| Europa League | 12 August 2023 | 14 March 2024 | Third qualifying round | Round of 16 | 12 | 7 | 1 | 4 | 27 | 14 | +13 | 58.33 |
| Total | | | | | 50 | 35 | 8 | 7 | 109 | 41 | +68 | 70.00 |

Source: FBREF

=== Czech First League ===
==== Regular season ====
===== League table =====
| Pos | Team | Pld | W | D | L | GF | GA | GD | Pts | Qualification or relegation |
|---|---|---|---|---|---|---|---|---|---|---|
| 1 | Sparta Prague | 30 | 24 | 4 | 2 | 70 | 26 | +44 | 76 | Qualification for the Championship group |
| 2 | Slavia Prague | 30 | 22 | 6 | 2 | 62 | 23 | +39 | 72 | Qualification for the Championship group |
| 3 | Viktoria Plzeň | 30 | 19 | 5 | 6 | 67 | 33 | +34 | 62 | Qualification for the Championship group |
| 4 | Baník Ostrava | 30 | 13 | 6 | 11 | 48 | 39 | +9 | 45 | Qualification for the Championship group |
| 5 | Mladá Boleslav | 30 | 12 | 8 | 10 | 50 | 46 | +4 | 44 | Qualification for the Championship group |

Source: Fortuna Liga
Rules for classification: 1) Points; 2) Head-to-head points; 3) Head-to-head goal difference; 4) Head-to-head goals scored; 5) Goal difference; 6) Goals scored; 7) Fair-play ranking; 8) Draw.

===== Results summary =====
| Overall | | | | | | | | Home | | | | | | Away | | | | | |
| Pld | W | D | L | GF | GA | GD | Pts | W | D | L | GF | GA | GD | W | D | L | GF | GA | GD |
|---|---|---|---|---|---|---|---|---|---|---|---|---|---|---|---|---|---|---|---|
| 30 | 22 | 6 | 2 | 62 | 23 | +39 | 72 | 12 | 2 | 1 | 36 | 12 | +24 | 10 | 4 | 1 | 26 | 11 | +15 |

Source: Fortuna Liga

===== Results by round =====
| Round | 1 | 2 | 3 | 4 | 5 | 6 | 7 | 8 | 9 | 10 | 11 | 12 | 13 | 14 | 15 | 16 | 17 | 18 | 19 | 20 | 21 | 22 | 23 | 24 | 25 | 26 | 27 | 28 | 29 | 30 |
|---|---|---|---|---|---|---|---|---|---|---|---|---|---|---|---|---|---|---|---|---|---|---|---|---|---|---|---|---|---|---|
| Ground | H | A | H | A | H | A | H | A | H | A | A | H | A | H | A | H | A | H | A | H | A | H | A | H | H | A | H | A | H | A |
| Result | W | W | W | W | W | D | W | W | D | D | W | W | W | L | W | W | D | W | W | W | W | W | D | W | W | W | W | L | D | W |
| Position | 5 | 1 | 2 | 2 | 1 | 2 | 2 | 2 | 2 | 2 | 2 | 2 | 1 | 2 | 2 | 2 | 2 | 2 | 2 | 2 | 2 | 2 | 2 | 2 | 2 | 2 | 1 | 2 | 2 | 2 |

Source: Fortuna Liga
A = Away; H = Home; W = Win; D = Draw; L = Loss

===== Matches =====
The league fixtures were unveiled on 21 June 2023.

| 22 July 2023 1 | Slavia Prague | 2–0 | Hradec Králové | Prague |
| 18:00 CEST (UTC+2) | van Buren 4'; Chytil 70' | Report | Pilař (yellow card) 39'; Krejčí (yellow card) 64'; Kučera (yellow card) 69' | Stadium: Fortuna Arena; Attendance: 17,311; Referee: Jan Všetečka |

| 30 July 2023 2 | České Budějovice | 1–3 | Slavia Prague | České Budějovice |
| 15:00 CEST (UTC+2) | Havel (yellow card) 15'; Hora (yellow card) 20' (yellow-red card) 89'; Čmelík (yellow card) 40'; Ondrášek 53' | Report | Zafeiris 13' (yellow card) 56'; Provod 74'; Chytil 84' | Stadium: Stadion Střelecký ostrov Attendance: 6,681; Referee: Ladislav Szikszay |

| 6 August 2023 3 | Slavia Prague | 2–1 | Zlín | Prague |
| 18:00 CEST (UTC+2) | Lingr 47'; Dorley (yellow card) 56' van Buren 60' | Report | Cedidla (yellow card) 36'; Janetzký (yellow card) 53'; Černín 84' | Stadium: Fortuna Arena; Attendance: 17,581; Referee: Pavel Orel |

| 13 August 2023 4 | Mladá Boleslav | 0–1 | Slavia Prague | Mladá Boleslav |
| 15:00 CEST (UTC+2) | Sakala (yellow card) 83'; Šimek (yellow card) 90+1' | Report | Tomič (yellow card) 37'; Poulolo 59' (o.g.) | Stadium: Lokotrans Aréna; Attendance: 5,000; Referee: Jan Machálek |

| 20 August 2023 5 | Slavia Prague | 1–0 | Baník Ostrava | Prague |
| 18:00 CEST (UTC+2) | Tijani 47' (yellow card) 67'; Ševčík (yellow card) 78'; Kolář (yellow card) 90+1' | Report | Frydrych (yellow card) 18'; Boula (yellow card) 67'; Blažek (yellow card) 74' | Stadium: Fortuna Arena; Attendance: 19,164; Referee: Jan Všetečka |

| 27 August 2023 6 | Jablonec | 1–1 | Slavia Prague | Jablonec nad Nisou |
| 15:00 CEST (UTC+2) | Hurtado (yellow card) 36'; Pleštil 43'; Slávik (yellow card) 44'; Souček (yellow card) 73'; Hübschman (yellow card) 90' | Report | Tijani (yellow card) 33'; Holeš 48'; Bořil (yellow card) 73'; Ogbu (yellow card) 78' | Stadium: Stadion Střelnice; Attendance: 4,511; Referee: Dalibor Černý |

| 3 September 2023 7 | Slavia Prague | 5–1 | Karviná | Prague |
| 18:00 CEST (UTC+2) | Tijani 13'; Masopust (yellow card) 18'; Jurásek 38'; Jurečka 43'; Zafeiris (yellow card) 65'; Chytil 70'; Wallem 76' (pen.); Bořil (yellow card) 88'; Ogungbayi (yellow card) 90+1' | Report | Akinyemi 6'; Memić (yellow card) 32'; Boháč (yellow card) 53'; Bederka (yellow card) 72'; Svozil (yellow card) 78' | Stadium: Fortuna Arena; Attendance: 17,352; Referee: Dominik Starý |

| 16 September 2023 8 | Pardubice | 0–1 | Slavia Prague | Pardubice |
| 18:00 CEST (UTC+2) | Surzyn (yellow card) 38'; Helešic (yellow card) 43'; Krobot (yellow card) 72' | Report | Jurečka 28' (pen.); Wallem (yellow card) 46' | Stadium: CFIG Arena; Attendance: 4,620; Referee: Ondřej Pechanec |

| 24 September 2023 9 | Slavia Prague | 1–1 | Sparta Prague | Prague |
| 18:00 CEST (UTC+2) | Jurečka 58' (pen.); Ogbu (yellow card) 69'; Zafeiris (yellow card) 81'; Bořil (red card) 88'; Chytil (yellow card) 90'; Wallem (yellow card) 90+1'; Schranz (yellow card) 90+5' | Report | Preciado (yellow card) 22'; Olatunji (yellow card) 32'; Panák (yellow card) 73'; Laçi (yellow card) 82'; Pešek (yellow card) 84'; Krejčí (red card) 88'; Haraslín 90+10' (pen.), (yellow card) 90+11' | Stadium: Fortuna Arena; Attendance: 19,370; Referee: Ladislav Szikszay |

| 1 October 2023 10 | Teplice | 0–0 | Slavia Prague | Teplice |
| 15:00 CEST (UTC+2) | Beránek (yellow card) 54'; Hora (yellow card) 87'; Dramé (yellow card) FT (red card) FT | Report | Holeš (yellow card) 49'; Dorley (yellow card) 87'; Mandous (yellow card) FT | Stadium: Na Stínadlech; Attendance: 15,193; Referee: Dalibor Černý |

| 8 October 2023 11 | Slovan Liberec | 2–3 | Slavia Prague | Liberec |
| 18:00 CEST (UTC+2) | Kulenovič 5'; Preisler 8'; Červ (yellow card) 72'; Okoh (yellow card) 90+2'; Varfolomeyev (yellow card) 90+6' | Report | Schranz 16' (yellow card) 78' van Buren 53' (pen.) (yellow card) 83'; Ogbu (yellow card) 57'; Zafeiris (yellow card) 58' (goal) 87'; Provod (yellow card) 75' | Stadium: Stadion u Nisy; Attendance: 5,927; Referee: Ondřej Pechanec |

| 21 October 2023 12 | Slavia Prague | 2–0 | Slovácko | Prague |
| 18:00 CEST (UTC+2) | Dumitrescu (yellow card) 20'; Tomič (yellow card) 41'; Hromada (yellow card) 45+2'; Jurásek 78'; Jurečka 90' | Report | Kadlec (yellow card) 29'; Mihálik (yellow card) 45+2'; Reinberk (yellow card) 84' | Stadium: Fortuna Arena; Attendance: 17,084; Referee: Jan Petřík |

| 29 October 2023 13 | Bohemians 1905 | 0–2 | Slavia Prague | Prague |
| 18:00 CET (UTC+1) | Dostál (yellow card) 83' | Report | Tomič 20'; Dorley (yellow card) 45'; Chytil 67' | Stadium: Ďolíček; Attendance: 6,212; Referee: Karel Rouček |

| 5 November 2023 14 | Slavia Prague | 1–2 | Viktoria Plzeň | Prague |
| 18:00 CET (UTC+1) | van Buren 13'; Bořil (yellow card) 57'; Vlček (yellow card) 87'; Tijani (yellow card) 90+6' | Report | Traoré (yellow card) 51'; Kalvach (yellow card) 51'; Jirka 64', 79', (yellow card) 75'; Hranáč (yellow card) 86'; Dweh (yellow card) 90+2'; Sýkora (yellow card) 90+5' | Stadium: Fortuna Arena; Attendance: 18,434; Referee: Dalibor Černý |

| 12 November 2023 15 | Sigma Olomouc | 1–3 | Slavia Prague | Olomouc |
| 18:00 CET (UTC+1) | Breite (yellow card) 4'; Pokorný 15'; Zmrzlý (yellow card) 35'; Vodháněl (yellow card) 45+1' | Report | Wallem 4' (yellow card) 87'; Jurečka (yellow card) 35' (goal) 56'; Tomič 43'; Vlček (yellow card) 47'; Douděra (yellow card) 89' | Stadium: Andrův stadion Attendance: 8,897; Referee: Stanislav Volek |

| 25 November 2023 16 | Slavia Prague | 2–1 | České Budějovice | Prague |
| 18:00 CET (UTC+1) | Jurečka 7'; Hromada (yellow card) 37'; Chytil 72' | Report | Adediran 20' (yellow card) 60'; Šigut (yellow card) 54' | Stadium: Fortuna Arena; Attendance: 16,620; Referee: Michael Kvítek |

| 10 December 2023 18 | Slavia Prague | 2–0 | Mladá Boleslav | Prague |
| 18:00 CET (UTC+1) | Ogbu (yellow card) 33'; Jurečka (yellow card) 35' (goal) 53' (pen.); Holeš 49' | Report | Pulkrab (yellow card) 33'; Kušej (yellow card) 33' | Stadium: Fortuna Arena; Attendance: 16,064; Referee: Stanislav Volek |

| 17 December 2023 19 | Baník Ostrava | 2–3 | Slavia Prague | Ostrava |
| 15:00 CET (UTC+1) | Buchta 27'; Rigo 29'; Tanko (red card) 67' | Report | Jurečka 26' van Buren 45+1'; Bořil 59' | Stadium: Městský stadion Attendance: 12,735; Referee: Karel Rouček |

| 11 February 2024 20 | Slavia Prague | 4–3 | Karviná | Prague |
| 18:00 CET (UTC+1) | Wallem 3', 11'; Jurečka 24', 90+7'; Holeš (yellow card) 79'; Tijani (yellow card) 87'; Schranz (yellow card) 90+9' | Report | Chanturishvili 5'; Chramosta 14'; Kratochvíl (yellow card) 42'; Martinec 48'; Hanuš (yellow card) 58'; Nebyla (yellow card) 83' | Stadium: Fortuna Arena; Attendance: 17,202; Referee: Dominik Starý |

| 14 February 2024 17 | Zlín | 1–1 | Slavia Prague | Zlín |
| 18:00 CET (UTC+1) | Janetzký (yellow card) 42'; Ikugar 67' (yellow card) 90+4'; Slončík (yellow card) 74' | Report | Chytil 45+1'; Jurečka (red card) 82' | Stadium: Letná Stadion; Attendance: 5,297; Referee: Ondřej Pechanec |

| 18 February 2024 21 | Karviná | 0–3 | Slavia Prague | Karviná |
| 15:00 CET (UTC+1) | Žák (yellow card) 4'; Ražnatovič (yellow card) 60'; Akinyemi (yellow card) 84' | Report | Memić 15' (o.g.); Chytil 17'; Dorley (yellow card) 19'; Ogbu (yellow card) 39'; Schranz (yellow card) 62'; Diouf 80' | Stadium: Městský stadion Attendance: 4,038; Referee: Ladislav Szikszay |

| 25 February 2024 22 | Slavia Prague | 3–0 | Pardubice | Prague |
| 15:00 CET (UTC+1) | Chytil 66', 72', 74' | Report | Patrák (yellow card) 41'; Surzyn (yellow card) 45+6'; Hlavatý (yellow card) 56' | Stadium: Fortuna Arena; Attendance: 17,562; Referee: Marek Radina |

| 3 March 2024 23 | Sparta Prague | 0–0 | Slavia Prague | Prague |
| 18:00 CET (UTC+1) | Vitík (yellow card) 72'; Kairinen (yellow card) 82'; Preciado (red card) 86'; Birmančević (yellow card) 90+1' | Report | Schranz (yellow card) 35'; Vlček (yellow card) 45+4'; Zima (yellow card) 67'; Masopust (yellow card) 81' | Stadium: Stadion Letná; Attendance: 18,283; Referee: Ondřej Pechanec |

| 10 March 2024 24 | Slavia Prague | 4–0 | Teplice | Prague |
| 15:00 CET (UTC+1) | Jurásek 38', 42'; Wallem 57'; Bořil (yellow card) 72'; Jurečka 90+3' | Report | Mićević (yellow card) 3'; Chaloupek (yellow card) 22' | Stadium: Fortuna Arena; Attendance: 17,464; Referee: Jan Machálek |

| 17 March 2024 25 | Slavia Prague | 3–0 | Slovan Liberec | Prague |
| 15:00 CET (UTC+1) | Jurečka 15' (pen.), 90+1'; Chytil 83' | Report | Pourzitidis (yellow card) 44'; Chaluš (yellow card) 77' | Stadium: Fortuna Arena; Attendance: 17,513; Referee: Dalibor Černý |

| 30 March 2024 26 | Slovácko | 1–3 | Slavia Prague | Uherské Hradiště |
| 18:00 CET (UTC+1) | Vecheta 40'; Trávník (yellow card) 70'; Daníček (yellow card) 84'; Reinberk (yellow card) 85'; Kim (yellow card) 87' | Report | Provod 29'; Jurečka 44', 56' (pen.) (yellow card) 65'; Wallem (yellow card) 86' | Stadium: Městský fotbalový stadion Miroslava Valenty; Attendance: 8,000; Referee: Karel Rouček |

| 6 April 2024 27 | Slavia Prague | 2–1 | Bohemians 1905 | Prague |
| 18:00 CEST (UTC+2) | Ševčík 55'; Chytil 67'; Dorley (yellow card) 84' | Report | Soukup (yellow card) 45+1'; Puškáč (yellow card) 76'; Dostál (yellow card) 84'; Hůlka 90+3' | Stadium: Fortuna Arena; Attendance: 19,034; Referee: Jan Všetečka |

| 13 April 2024 28 | Viktoria Plzeň | 1–0 | Slavia Prague | Plzeň |
| 18:00 CEST (UTC+2) | Kalvach (yellow card) 37'; Šulc 87'; Jedlička (yellow card) 90+5' | Report | Provod (yellow card) 27'; Zafeiris (yellow card) 66'; Chytil (yellow card) 79' | Stadium: Doosan Arena; Attendance: 11,477; Referee: Ondřej Pechanec |

| 21 April 2024 29 | Slavia Prague | 2–2 | Sigma Olomouc | Prague |
| 15:00 CEST (UTC+2) | Dorley (yellow card) 41'; Bořil 77'; Chytil 84'; Douděra (yellow card) 86'; Holeš (yellow card) 90+6' | Report | Zifčák (yellow card) 28' (goal) 66'; Matys (yellow card) 33'; Uriča (yellow card) 50'; Pokorný 52'; Stoppen (yellow card) 78'; Zorvan (yellow card) 86' | Stadium: Fortuna Arena; Attendance: 17,986; Referee: Marek Radina |

| 28 April 2024 30 | Hradec Králové | 1–2 | Slavia Prague | Hradec Králové |
| 15:00 CEST (UTC+2) | Kučera (yellow card) 33'; Spáčil 90+1' | Report | Provod 41'; Douděra (yellow card) 42'; Zmrzlý 43' | Stadium: Malšovická aréna Attendance: 9,300; Referee: Dalibor Černý |

==== Championship group ====
===== League table =====
| Pos | Team | Pld | W | D | L | GF | GA | GD | Pts | Qualification or relegation | SPA | SLA | PLZ | OST | MLA | SLO |
|---|---|---|---|---|---|---|---|---|---|---|---|---|---|---|---|---|
| 1 | Sparta Prague (C) | 35 | 27 | 6 | 2 | 82 | 30 | +52 | 87 | Qualification for the Champions League second qualifying round | — | 0–0 | 1–1 | 2–1 | — | — |
| 2 | Slavia Prague | 35 | 26 | 7 | 2 | 76 | 24 | +52 | 85 | Qualification for the Champions League third qualifying round (Note: Since the Europa League winners, Atalanta qualified for the Champions League via league position, Slavia Prague were promoted from the Champions League second qualifying round to the third qualifying round as one of the two teams with the highest coefficient in the second qualifying round.) | — | — | 3–0 | 5–0 | 4–0 | — |
| 3 | Viktoria Plzeň | 35 | 21 | 7 | 7 | 76 | 40 | +36 | 70 | Qualification for the Europa League third qualifying round | — | — | — | 1–1 | 3–0 | 4–2 |
| 4 | Baník Ostrava | 35 | 14 | 7 | 14 | 56 | 48 | +8 | 49 | Qualification for the Conference League second qualifying round | — | — | — | — | 0–1 | 6–0 |
| 5 | Mladá Boleslav (O) | 35 | 13 | 8 | 14 | 51 | 59 | −8 | 47 | Qualification for the Conference League play-off final | 0–5 | — | — | — | — | 0–1 |
| 6 | Slovácko | 35 | 12 | 8 | 15 | 45 | 56 | −11 | 44 | | 2–4 | 1–2 | — | — | — | — |

Source: Fortuna Liga
Legend: Blue = home team win; Yellow = draw; Red = away team win.
Rules for classification: 1) Total points; 2) Points earned in regular season; 3) Head-to-head points (regular season); 4) Head-to-head goal difference (regular season); 5) Head-to-head goals scored (regular season); 5) Goal difference (all matches); 6) Goals scored (all matches); 7) Fair-play ranking; 8) Draw.
(C) Champions; (O) Play-off winners

===== Results summary =====
| Overall | | | | | | | | Home | | | | | | Away | | | | | |
| Pld | W | D | L | GF | GA | GD | Pts | W | D | L | GF | GA | GD | W | D | L | GF | GA | GD |
|---|---|---|---|---|---|---|---|---|---|---|---|---|---|---|---|---|---|---|---|
| 5 | 4 | 1 | 0 | 14 | 1 | +13 | 13 | 3 | 0 | 0 | 12 | 0 | +12 | 1 | 1 | 0 | 2 | 1 | +1 |

Source: Fortuna Liga

===== Results by round =====
| Round | 1 | 2 | 3 | 4 | 5 |
|---|---|---|---|---|---|
| Ground | H | A | H | A | H |
| Result | W | D | W | W | W |
| Position | 2 | 2 | 2 | 2 | 2 |

Source: Fortuna Liga
A = Away; H = Home; W = Win; D = Draw; L = Loss

===== Matches =====
| 4 May 2024 31 | Slavia Prague | 5–0 | Baník Ostrava | Prague |
| 18:00 CEST (UTC+2) | Schranz 28' (yellow card) 85'; Chytil 48', 58'; Jurečka 55'; Jurásek 78' | Report | Rusnák (yellow card) 29'; Blažek (yellow card) 41'; Tanko (red card) 52' | Stadium: Fortuna Arena; Attendance: 18,028; Referee: Ladislav Szikszay |

| 11 May 2024 32 | Sparta Prague | 0–0 | Slavia Prague | Prague |
| 17:30 CEST (UTC+2) | Haraslín (yellow card) 18' (yellow-red card) 63'; Laçi (yellow card) 46'; Wiesner (yellow card) 57'; Krejčí (yellow card) 66' | Report | Jurásek (yellow card) 22'; Holeš (yellow card) 37' | Stadium: Stadion Letná; Attendance: 18,199; Referee: Dalibor Černý |

| 15 May 2024 33 | Slavia Prague | 3–0 | Viktoria Plzeň | Prague |
| 19:30 CEST (UTC+2) | Zmrzlý 5'; Dorley 10'; Jurečka 90+8' | Report | Hejda (yellow card) 22'; Havel (yellow card) 73' | Stadium: Fortuna Arena; Attendance: 17,895; Referee: Karel Rouček |

| 18 May 2024 34 | Sparta Prague | 1–2 | Slavia Prague | Uherské Hradiště |
| 17:00 CEST (UTC+2) | Kohút (yellow card) 52'; Zima 65' (o.g.); Juroška (yellow card) 72'; Blahút (yellow card) 73' | Report | Holeš 62'; Chytil 71' | Stadium: Městský fotbalový stadion Miroslava Valenty; Attendance: 6,088; Referee: Ladislav Szikszay |

| 26 May 2024 35 | Slavia Prague | 4–0 | Mladá Boleslav | Prague |
| 16:00 CEST (UTC+2) | Jurečka 16', 78'; Zmrzlý 27'; Zafeiris 89' | Report | Suchý (yellow card) 58' | Stadium: Fortuna Arena; Attendance: 16,718; Referee: Marek Radina |

=== Czech Cup ===
| 27 September 2023 Third round | Hanácká Slavia Kroměříž | 0–2 | Slavia Prague | Kroměříž |
| 16:00 CEST (UTC+2) | Jaroň (yellow card) 45'; Gonçalves (yellow card) 77' | Report | Jurásek 36'; Chytil 56' | Stadium: Stadion SK Hanácká Slavia Kroměříž; Referee: Stanislav Volek |

| 6 December 2023 Fourth round | Hradec Králové | 0–2 (a.e.t.) | Slavia Prague | Hradec Králové |
| 18:00 CET (UTC+1) | Čmelík (yellow card) 52'; Šašinka (yellow card) 56'; Leibl (yellow card) 102'; Čihák (yellow card) 108' | Report | Zafeiris (yellow card) 25'; Wallem (yellow card) 39' (goal) 109' van Buren 120+1' | Stadium: Malšovická aréna Referee: Ondřej Pechanec |

| 28 February 2024 Quarter-finals | Slavia Prague | 2–3 (a.e.t.) | Sparta Prague | Prague |
| 18:00 CET (UTC+1) | Holeš (yellow card) 27'; Schranz 39'; Masopust (yellow card) 45'; Diouf 47'; Tomič (yellow card) 111'; Bořil (yellow card) 115' | Report | Preciado (yellow card) 23'; Olatunji 55', 70'; Karabec 114' (pen.) (yellow card) 115'; Kuchta (yellow card) 119'; Zelený (yellow card) 120+5' (yellow-red card) 120+7'; Vorel (yellow card) 120+6' | Stadium: Fortuna Arena; Referee: Karel Rouček |

=== UEFA Europa League ===
==== Qualifying phase ====
| 10 August 2023 Third qualifying round 1st leg | Slavia Prague (Czech Republic) | 3–0 | (Ukraine) Dnipro-1 | Prague, Czech Republic |
| 19:00 CEST (UTC+2) | Schranz 5', 37'; Ogbu (red card) 59'; Wallem 81'; Masopust (yellow card) 90+7' | Report | Svatok (yellow card) 41'; Babenko (yellow card) 53'; Lyednyev (yellow card) 71'; Rubchynskyi (yellow card) 53'; Kravets (yellow card) 87' | Stadium: Fortuna Arena; Attendance: 19,102; Referee: Lawrence Visser (Belgium) |

| 17 August 2023 Third qualifying round 2nd leg | Dnipro-1 (Ukraine) | 1–1 (1–4 agg.) | (Czech Republic) Slavia Prague | Košice, Slovakia |
| 20:00 CEST (UTC+2) | Hutsulyak (yellow card) 29'; Rubchynskyi 45+1'; Babenko (yellow card) 70' | Report | Jurečka 52' | Stadium: Košická futbalová aréna Attendance: 5,855; Referee: Jesús Gil Manzano (Spain) |
Note: Due to the Russian invasion of Ukraine, Ukrainian teams are required to play their home matches at neutral venues until further notice.

| 24 August 2023 Play-off round 1st leg | Slavia Prague (Czech Republic) | 2–0 | (Ukraine) Zorya Luhansk | Prague, Czech Republic |
| 19:00 CEST (UTC+2) | Tijani 81'; Masopust 90+4' | Report | Dryshlyuk (yellow card) 7'; Guerrero (yellow card) 44'; Batahov (yellow card) 50'; Yatsyk (yellow card) 56'; Turbayevskyi (yellow card) 62' | Stadium: Fortuna Arena; Attendance: 18,522; Referee: Kristo Tohver (Estonia) |

| 31 August 2023 Play-off round 2nd leg | Zorya Luhansk (Ukraine) | 2–1 (2–3 agg.) | (Czech Republic) Slavia Prague | Lublin, Poland |
| 19:00 CEST (UTC+2) | Snurnitsyn (yellow card) 14'; Alefirenko 32'; Antyukh 41' | Report | Jurásek 83' | Stadium: Arena Lublin; Attendance: 964; Referee: Jérôme Brisard (France) |
Note: Due to the Russian invasion of Ukraine, Ukrainian teams are required to play their home matches at neutral venues until further notice.

==== Group stage ====
The draw for the group stage was held on 1 September 2023.

| Pos | Team | Pld | W | D | L | GF | GA | GD | Pts | Qualification | SLP | ROM | SRV | SHE |
|---|---|---|---|---|---|---|---|---|---|---|---|---|---|---|
| 1 | (Czech Republic) Slavia Prague | 6 | 5 | 0 | 1 | 17 | 4 | +13 | 15 | Advance to round of 16 | — | 2–0 | 4–0 | 6–0 |
| 2 | (Italy) Roma | 6 | 4 | 1 | 1 | 12 | 4 | +8 | 13 | Advance to knockout round play-offs | 2–0 | — | 4–0 | 3–0 |
| 3 | (Switzerland) Servette | 6 | 1 | 2 | 3 | 4 | 13 | −9 | 5 | Transfer to Europa Conference League | 0–2 | 1–1 | — | 2–1 |
| 4 | (Moldova) Sheriff Tiraspol | 6 | 0 | 1 | 5 | 5 | 17 | −12 | 1 | | 2–3 | 1–2 | 1–1 | — |

Source: UEFA
Rules for classification: Group stage tiebreakers

| 21 September 2023 1 | Servette (Switzerland) | 0–2 | (Czech Republic) Slavia Prague | Lancy, Switzerland |
| 18:45 CEST (UTC+2) | Severin (yellow card) 27'; Rouiller (yellow card) 36'; Bedia (yellow card) 64' | Report | Masopust 32'; Ogbu 59'; Dorley (yellow card) 66'; Tijani (yellow card) 79'; Provod (yellow card) 90+1'; Mandous (yellow card) 90+3' | Stadium: Stade de Genève; Attendance: 19,783; Referee: Giorgi Kruashvili (Georgia) |

| 5 October 2023 2 | Slavia Prague (Czech Republic) | 6–0 | (Moldova) Sheriff Tiraspol | Prague, Czech Republic |
| 21:00 CEST (UTC+2) | Chytil 4', 71'; Ogbu 7'; Garananga 39' (o.g.); Schranz 47'; Douděra 58' | Report | Tovar (yellow card) 35'; Kiki (yellow card) 44'; Mbekeli (yellow card) 68' | Stadium: Fortuna Arena; Attendance: 17,844; Referee: Willy Delajod (France) |

| 26 October 2023 3 | Roma (Italy) | 2–0 | (Czech Republic) Slavia Prague | Rome, Italy |
| 21:00 CEST (UTC+2) | Bove 1' (yellow card) 23'; Lukaku 17'; Ndicka (yellow card) 68' | Report | Masopust (yellow card) 27' | Stadium: Stadio Olimpico; Attendance: 64,934; Referee: Espen Eskås (Norway) |

| 9 November 2023 4 | Slavia Prague (Czech Republic) | 2–0 | (Italy) Roma | Prague, Czech Republic |
| 18:45 CET (UTC+1) | Jurečka 50'; Masopust (yellow card) 58', (goal) 74'; Ševčík (yellow card) 83'; Van Buren (yellow card) 88' | Report | Paredes (yellow card) 44'; Ndicka (yellow card) 90+5' | Stadium: Fortuna Arena; Attendance: 19,265; Referee: François Letexier (France) |

| 30 November 2023 5 | Sheriff Tiraspol (Moldova) | 2–3 | (Czech Republic) Slavia Prague | Tiraspol, Moldova |
| 21:00 CET (UTC+1) | Apostolakis (yellow card) 33'; Tovar 45+3'; Ngom Mbekeli 56'; Talal (yellow card) 67'; Badolo (yellow card) 83'; Artunduaga (yellow card) 90+4' | Report | Jurečka 19'; Dumitrescu (yellow card) 45+2'; Zafeiris 78'; Tijani (yellow card) 83' (goal) 90+5' (pen.) | Stadium: Arena Sheriff; Attendance: 1,520; Referee: Christian-Petru Ciochirca (Austria) |

| 14 December 2023 6 | Slavia Prague (Czech Republic) | 4–0 | (Switzerland) Servette | Prague, Czech Republic |
| 18:45 CET (UTC+1) | Douděra 15'; Schranz 25'; Chytil 30', 45+1' | Report | Diba (yellow card) 22'; Stevanović (yellow card) 37' | Stadium: Fortuna Arena; Attendance: 18,380; Referee: Nick Walsh (Scotland) |

==== Knockout phase ====
| 7 March 2024 Round of 16 1st leg | AC Milan (Italy) | 4–2 | (Czech Republic) Slavia Prague | Milan, Italy |
| 21:00 CET (UTC+1) | Florenzi (yellow card) 2'; Giroud 34'; Reijnders 44'; Loftus-Cheek 45+1'; Calabria (yellow card) 72'; Pulisic 85' | Report | Diouf (red card) 26'; Douděra 36'; Schranz 65' | Stadium: San Siro; Attendance: 59,325; Referee: Halil Umut Meler (Turkey) |

| 14 March 2024 Round of 16 2nd leg | Slavia Prague (Czech Republic) | 1–3 (3–7 agg.) | (Italy) AC Milan | Prague, Czech Republic |
| 18:45 CET (UTC+1) | Holeš (red card) 20'; Douděra (yellow card) 22'; Jurásek 84'; Tomič (yellow card) 86'; Dorley (yellow card) 89' | Report | Pulisic 33'; Loftus-Cheek 36'; Tomori (yellow card) 44'; Leão 45+6', (yellow card) 89'; Gabbia (yellow card) 56' | Stadium: Fortuna Arena; Attendance: 19,334; Referee: Glenn Nyberg (Sweden) |

== Squad statistics ==
As of match played 26 May 2024

=== Appearances and goals ===
| No. | Pos | Nat | Player | Total | | First League | | Czech Cup | | Europa League | |
| No. | Pos | Nat | Player | Apps | Goals | Apps | Goals | Apps | Goals | Apps | Goals |
|---|---|---|---|---|---|---|---|---|---|---|---|
| 1 | GK | (Czech Republic) CZE | Ondřej Kolář | 11 | 0 | 6 | 0 | 1 | 0 | 4 | 0 |
| 2 | DF | (The Gambia) GAM | Sheriff Sinyan | 5 | 0 | 0+4 | 0 | 0+1 | 0 | 0 | 0 |
| 3 | DF | (Czech Republic) CZE | Tomáš Holeš | 40 | 3 | 24+4 | 3 | 1 | 0 | 11 | 0 |
| 4 | DF | (Czech Republic) CZE | David Zima | 17 | 0 | 12+2 | 0 | 1 | 0 | 2 | 0 |
| 5 | DF | (Nigeria) NGR | Igoh Ogbu | 41 | 2 | 29+1 | 0 | 2 | 0 | 9 | 2 |
| 6 | MF | (Norway) NOR | Conrad Wallem | 38 | 7 | 20+5 | 5 | 3 | 1 | 4+6 | 1 |
| 8 | MF | (Czech Republic) CZE | Lukáš Masopust | 35 | 3 | 10+13 | 0 | 2 | 0 | 10 | 3 |
| 9 | FW | (Nigeria) NGR | Muhamed Tijani | 33 | 4 | 10+15 | 2 | 0+3 | 0 | 0+5 | 2 |
| 10 | MF | (Norway) NOR | Christos Zafeiris | 39 | 4 | 13+14 | 3 | 1 | 0 | 9+2 | 1 |
| 11 | FW | (Czech Republic) CZE | Stanislav Tecl | 8 | 0 | 0+6 | 0 | 1+1 | 0 | 0 | 0 |
| 12 | DF | (Senegal) SEN | El Hadji Malick Diouf | 9 | 2 | 4+3 | 1 | 1 | 1 | 1 | 0 |
| 13 | FW | (Czech Republic) CZE | Mojmír Chytil | 47 | 21 | 21+13 | 16 | 3 | 1 | 6+4 | 4 |
| 14 | FW | (Netherlands) NED | Mick van Buren | 38 | 6 | 12+15 | 5 | 0+2 | 1 | 6+3 | 0 |
| 15 | MF | (Czech Republic) CZE | Václav Jurečka | 44 | 22 | 25+7 | 19 | 1 | 0 | 5+6 | 3 |
| 16 | MF | (Ivory Coast) CIV | Boris Koffi | 1 | 0 | 0 | 0 | 0+1 | 0 | 0 | 0 |
| 17 | MF | (Czech Republic) CZE | Lukáš Provod | 42 | 3 | 19+11 | 3 | 0+1 | 0 | 8+3 | 0 |
| 18 | DF | (Czech Republic) CZE | Jan Bořil | 19 | 2 | 13 | 2 | 1+1 | 0 | 2+2 | 0 |
| 19 | DF | (Liberia) LBR | Oscar Dorley | 44 | 1 | 28+3 | 1 | 2 | 0 | 11 | 0 |
| 21 | MF | (Czech Republic) CZE | David Douděra | 39 | 3 | 22+3 | 0 | 2+1 | 0 | 10+1 | 3 |
| 23 | MF | (Czech Republic) CZE | Petr Ševčík | 34 | 1 | 20+6 | 1 | 1+1 | 0 | 3+3 | 0 |
| 24 | MF | (Nigeria) NGR | Bolu Ogungbayi | 6 | 0 | 1+2 | 0 | 1 | 0 | 0+2 | 0 |
| 26 | FW | (Slovakia) SVK | Ivan Schranz | 32 | 8 | 12+9 | 2 | 1+1 | 1 | 7+2 | 5 |
| 27 | DF | (Czech Republic) CZE | Tomáš Vlček | 33 | 0 | 19+3 | 0 | 2+1 | 0 | 6+2 | 0 |
| 28 | GK | (Czech Republic) CZE | Aleš Mandous | 25 | 0 | 17 | 0 | 2 | 0 | 6 | 0 |
| 29 | DF | (Slovakia) SVK | Michal Tomič | 30 | 2 | 10+11 | 2 | 1+2 | 0 | 1+5 | 0 |
| 31 | DF | (Czech Republic) CZE | Ondřej Zmrzlý | 14 | 3 | 7+5 | 3 | 0 | 0 | 2 | 0 |
| 35 | MF | (Czech Republic) CZE | Matěj Jurásek | 33 | 6 | 10+15 | 5 | 1 | 1 | 1+6 | 0 |
| 36 | GK | (Czech Republic) CZE | Jindřich Staněk | 14 | 0 | 12 | 0 | 0 | 0 | 2 | 0 |
| 46 | FW | (Czech Republic) CZE | Samuel Pikolon | 1 | 0 | 0 | 0 | 0 | 0 | 0+1 | 0 |
Slavia Prague B Players:
Players away from Slavia Prague on loan:
| 4 | DF | (Syria) SYR | Aiham Ousou | 2 | 0 | 1 | 0 | 0 | 0 | 1 | 0 |
| 22 | DF | (Romania) ROU | Andres Dumitrescu | 8 | 0 | 1+1 | 0 | 1 | 0 | 4+1 | 0 |
| 25 | MF | (Slovakia) SVK | Jakub Hromada | 11 | 0 | 4+3 | 0 | 0+1 | 0 | 0+3 | 0 |
| 32 | MF | (Czech Republic) CZE | Ondřej Lingr | 4 | 1 | 2+1 | 1 | 0 | 0 | 1 | 0 |
Players who left Slavia Prague during the season:
| 30 | DF | (Ukraine) UKR | Taras Kacharaba | 2 | 0 | 1 | 0 | 1 | 0 | 0 | 0 |

=== Goal scorers ===
| Place | Position | Nation | Number | Name | HET liga | MOL Cup | Europa League | Total |
|---|---|---|---|---|---|---|---|---|
| 1 | FW | (Czech Republic) | 15 | Václav Jurečka | 19 | 0 | 3 | 22 |
| 2 | FW | (Czech Republic) | 13 | Mojmír Chytil | 16 | 1 | 4 | 21 |
| 3 | MF | (Czech Republic) | 35 | Matěj Jurásek | 5 | 1 | 2 | 8 |
| 3 | FW | (Slovenia) | 26 | Ivan Schranz | 2 | 1 | 5 | 8 |
| 5 | MF | (Norway) | 6 | Conrad Wallem | 5 | 1 | 1 | 7 |
| 6 | FW | (Netherlands) | 14 | Mick van Buren | 5 | 1 | 0 | 6 |
| 6 | MF | (Norway) | 10 | Christos Zafeiris | 3 | 0 | 1 | 6 |
| 8 | FW | (Nigeria) | 9 | Muhamed Tijani | 2 | 0 | 2 | 4 |
| 9 | MF | (Czech Republic) | 17 | Lukáš Provod | 3 | 0 | 0 | 3 |
| 9 | DF | (Czech Republic) | 33 | Ondřej Zmrzlý | 3 | 0 | 0 | 3 |
| 9 | DF | (Czech Republic) | 3 | Tomáš Holeš | 3 | 0 | 0 | 3 |
| 9 | MF | (Czech Republic) | 8 | Lukáš Masopust | 0 | 0 | 3 | 0 |
| 9 | MF | (Czech Republic) | 21 | David Douděra | 0 | 0 | 3 | 0 |
| 9 | | | | Own goal | 2 | 0 | 1 | 3 |
| 15 | DF | (Slovakia) | 29 | Michal Tomič | 2 | 0 | 0 | 2 |
| 15 | DF | (Czech Republic) | 18 | Jan Bořil | 2 | 0 | 0 | 2 |
| 15 | DF | (Senegal) | 12 | El Hadji Malick Diouf | 1 | 1 | 0 | 2 |
| 15 | DF | (Nigeria) | 5 | Igoh Ogbu | 0 | 0 | 2 | 0 |
| 19 | MF | (Czech Republic) | 23 | Petr Ševčík | 1 | 0 | 0 | 1 |
| 19 | DF | (Liberia) | 19 | Oscar Dorley | 1 | 0 | 0 | 1 |
| 19 | MF | (Czech Republic) | 32 | Ondřej Lingr | 1 | 0 | 0 | 1 |
| | | | | TOTALS | 76 | 6 | 27 | 109 |

=== Clean sheets ===
| Place | Position | Nation | Number | Name | HET liga | MOL Cup | Europa League | Total |
|---|---|---|---|---|---|---|---|---|
| 1 | GK | (Czech Republic) | 28 | Aleš Mandous | 8 | 1 | 4 | 13 |
| 2 | GK | (Czech Republic) | 36 | Jindřich Staněk | 6 | 0 | 0 | 6 |
| 2 | GK | (Czech Republic) | 1 | Ondřej Kolář | 3 | 1 | 2 | 6 |
| | | | | TOTALS | 17 | 2 | 6 | 25 |

=== Disciplinary record ===
| Number | Nation | Position | Name | HET liga | | MOL Cup | | Europa League | | Total | |
| Number | Nation | Position | Name | Yellow card | Red card | Yellow card | Red card | Yellow card | Red card | Yellow card | Red card |
| 1 | (Czech Republic) | GK | Ondřej Kolář | 1 | 0 | 0 | 0 | 0 | 0 | 1 | 0 |
| 3 | (Czech Republic) | DF | Tomáš Holeš | 4 | 0 | 1 | 0 | 0 | 1 | 5 | 1 |
| 4 | (Czech Republic) | DF | David Zima | 1 | 0 | 0 | 0 | 0 | 0 | 1 | 0 |
| 5 | (Nigeria) | DF | Igoh Ogbu | 5 | 0 | 0 | 0 | 0 | 1 | 5 | 1 |
| 6 | (Norway) | MF | Conrad Wallem | 4 | 0 | 1 | 0 | 0 | 0 | 5 | 0 |
| 8 | (Czech Republic) | MF | Lukáš Masopust | 2 | 0 | 1 | 0 | 3 | 0 | 6 | 0 |
| 9 | (Nigeria) | FW | Muhamed Tijani | 4 | 0 | 0 | 0 | 2 | 0 | 5 | 0 |
| 10 | (Norway) | MF | Christos Zafeiris | 5 | 0 | 1 | 0 | 0 | 0 | 6 | 0 |
| 12 | (Senegal) | DF | El Hadji Malick Diouf | 0 | 0 | 0 | 0 | 0 | 1 | 0 | 1 |
| 13 | (Czech Republic) | FW | Mojmír Chytil | 2 | 0 | 0 | 0 | 0 | 0 | 2 | 0 |
| 14 | (Netherlands) | FW | Mick van Buren | 1 | 0 | 0 | 0 | 1 | 0 | 2 | 0 |
| 15 | (Czech Republic) | FW | Václav Jurečka | 3 | 1 | 0 | 0 | 0 | 0 | 3 | 1 |
| 17 | (Czech Republic) | MF | Lukáš Provod | 2 | 0 | 0 | 0 | 1 | 0 | 3 | 0 |
| 18 | (Czech Republic) | DF | Jan Bořil | 4 | 1 | 1 | 0 | 0 | 0 | 5 | 1 |
| 19 | (Liberia) | DF | Oscar Dorley | 6 | 0 | 0 | 0 | 2 | 0 | 8 | 0 |
| 21 | (Czech Republic) | MF | David Douděra | 3 | 0 | 0 | 0 | 1 | 0 | 4 | 0 |
| 23 | (Czech Republic) | MF | Petr Ševčík | 1 | 0 | 0 | 0 | 1 | 0 | 2 | 0 |
| 24 | (Nigeria) | MF | Bolu Ogungbayi | 1 | 0 | 0 | 0 | 0 | 0 | 1 | 0 |
| 26 | (Slovakia) | FW | Ivan Schranz | 6 | 0 | 0 | 0 | 0 | 0 | 6 | 0 |
| 27 | (Czech Republic) | DF | Tomáš Vlček | 3 | 0 | 0 | 0 | 0 | 0 | 3 | 0 |
| 28 | (Czech Republic) | GK | Aleš Mandous | 1 | 0 | 0 | 0 | 1 | 0 | 2 | 0 |
| 29 | (Slovakia) | DF | Michal Tomič | 2 | 0 | 1 | 0 | 1 | 0 | 4 | 0 |
| 35 | (Czech Republic) | MF | Matěj Jurásek | 1 | 0 | 0 | 0 | 0 | 0 | 1 | 0 |
Slavia Prague B Players:
Players away on loan:
| 22 | (Romania) | DF | Andres Dumitrescu | 1 | 0 | 0 | 0 | 1 | 0 | 2 | 0 |
| 25 | (Slovakia) | MF | Jakub Hromada | 2 | 0 | 0 | 0 | 0 | 0 | 2 | 0 |
Players who left Slavia Prague during the season:
| | | | TOTALS | 65 | 2 | 6 | 0 | 14 | 3 | 85 | 5 |
