= Lukáš Provod =

Czech footballer (born 1996)

Personal information
- Date of birth: 23 October 1996 (age 30)
- Place of birth: Plzeň, Czech Republic
- Height: 1.89 m (6 ft 2 in)
- Position: Left winger

Team information
- Current team: Slavia Prague
- Number: 17

Youth career
- –2016: Viktoria Plzeň

Senior career*
Years	Team	Apps	(Gls)
2016–2019	Viktoria Plzeň	0	(0)
2016–2018	→ Baník Sokolov (loan)	40	(2)
2019	→ České Budějovice (loan)	20	(4)
2019	→ Slavia Prague (loan)	6	(1)
2020–	Slavia Prague	174	(24)

International career^{‡}
2017	Czech Republic U20	1	(0)
2017	Czech Republic U21	4	(1)
2020–	Czech Republic	42	(3)
- * Club domestic league appearances and goals as of 9 November 2026 ‡ National team caps and goals as of 12 November 2026

Lukáš Provod (born 23 October 1996) is a Czech professional footballer who plays as a left winger for Czech First League club Slavia Prague and the Czech Republic national team.

== Life ==
Provod was born and raised in Plzeň.

== Club career ==
Provod played in the Bohemian Football League in the 2015–16 season, representing Domažlice, who were operating as a farm team for his parent club Viktoria Plzeň. He joined Baník Sokolov on a season-long loan for the 2016–17 season. He played in all of his team's first five league matches in the Czech National Football League, scoring in the away game against Pardubice. Provod also represented Sokolov in the Czech Cup, scoring in the 2–1 second round loss against Zápy.

Provod joined České Budějovice for the second half of the 2018–19 Czech National Football League, celebrating the second-tier title and promotion to the Czech First League with the club at the end of the season.

On 3 September 2019, Slavia Prague confirmed that Provod had arrived on loan from Viktoria Plzeň for the remainder of the calendar year, and signed a deal for a permanent transfer afterwards.

== International career ==
Provod received his first call-up by coach Jaroslav Šilhavý for 2020–21 UEFA Nations League B matches against Slovakia and Scotland. He debuted in the former match on 4 September 2020, which the Czech Republic won 3–1.

On 27 March 2021, Provod scored his first senior international goal in a 2022 FIFA World Cup qualification match against Belgium. He was not included in the UEFA Euro 2020 squad due to a serious knee injury.

On 28 May 2024, Provod was selected in the 26-man squad for UEFA Euro 2024. The same year on 18 June, he scored his country's first goal of the tournament during their opening match against Portugal, which ended in a 2–1 defeat.

On 31 May 2026, Provod was selected in the 26-man squad for the 2026 FIFA World Cup.

== Career statistics ==
=== Club ===
As of 24 October 2026

Appearances and goals by club, season and competition
Club	Season	League			Czech Cup		Continental		Other		Total	
Club	Season	Division	Apps	Goals	Apps	Goals	Apps	Goals	Apps	Goals	Apps	Goals
Baník Sokolov (loan)	2016–17	Czech National League	27	2	1	1	—		—		28	3
Baník Sokolov (loan)	2017–18	Czech National League	13	0	1	0	—		—		14	0
Baník Sokolov (loan)	Total		40	2	2	1	—		—		42	3
České Budějovice (loan)	2018–19	Czech National League	13	2	—		—		—		13	2
České Budějovice (loan)	2019–20	Czech First League	7	2	1	0	—		—		8	2
České Budějovice (loan)	Total		20	4	1	0	—		—		21	4
Slavia Prague (loan)	2019–20	Czech First League	6	1	2	0	2 (Note: Appearances in UEFA Champions League)	0	0	0	10	1
Slavia Prague	2019–20	Czech First League	14	1	—		—		—		14	1
Slavia Prague	2020–21	Czech First League	28	3	1	0	12 (Note: Two appearances in UEFA Champions League, ten appearances and two goals in UEFA Europa League)	2	—		41	5
Slavia Prague	2021–22	Czech First League	6	3	0	0	0	0	—		6	3
Slavia Prague	2022–23	Czech First League	22	2	2	0	6 (Note: Appearances in UEFA Europa Conference League)	0	—		30	2
Slavia Prague	2023–24	Czech First League	30	3	1	0	11 (Note: Appearances in UEFA Europa League)	0	—		42	3
Slavia Prague	2024–25	Czech First League	32	4	0	0	10 (Note: Four appearances in UEFA Champions League, six appearances in UEFA Europa League)	0	—		42	4
Slavia Prague	2025–26	Czech First League	30	7	1	1	8	0	—		39	8
Slavia Prague	2026–27	Czech First League	11	0	0	0	2	1	—		13	1
Slavia Prague	Total		173	23	5	1	49	3	0	0	227	27
Career total			239	30	10	2	49	3	0	0	298	35

=== International ===
As of match played 12 November 2026

Appearances and goals by national team and year
National team	Year	Apps	Goals
Czech Republic	2020	4	0
Czech Republic	2021	3	1
Czech Republic	2022	1	0
Czech Republic	2023	8	1
Czech Republic	2024	12	1
Czech Republic	2025	7	0
Czech Republic	2026	7	0
Total		42	3

Scores and results list the Czech Republic's goal tally first, score column indicates score after each Provod goal.

List of international goals scored by Lukáš Provod
No.	Date	Venue	Opponent	Score	Result	Competition
1	27 March 2021	Sinobo Stadium, Prague, Czech Republic	Belgium	1–0	1–1	2022 FIFA World Cup qualification
2	20 June 2023	City Stadium, Podgorica, Montenegro	Montenegro	3–1	4–1	Friendly
3	18 June 2024	Red Bull Arena, Leipzig, Germany	Portugal	1–0	1–2	UEFA Euro 2024

== Honours ==
České Budějovice

- Czech National League: 2018–19

Slavia Prague

- Czech First League: 2019–20, 2020–21, 2024–25, 2025–26
- Czech Cup: 2020–21, 2022–23

Individual

- UEFA Europa League Squad of the Season: 2020–21
- Czech First League Player of the Year: 2020–21
- Czech First League Midfielder of the Year: 2020–21
