= Ladislav Takács =

Czech footballer (born 1996)

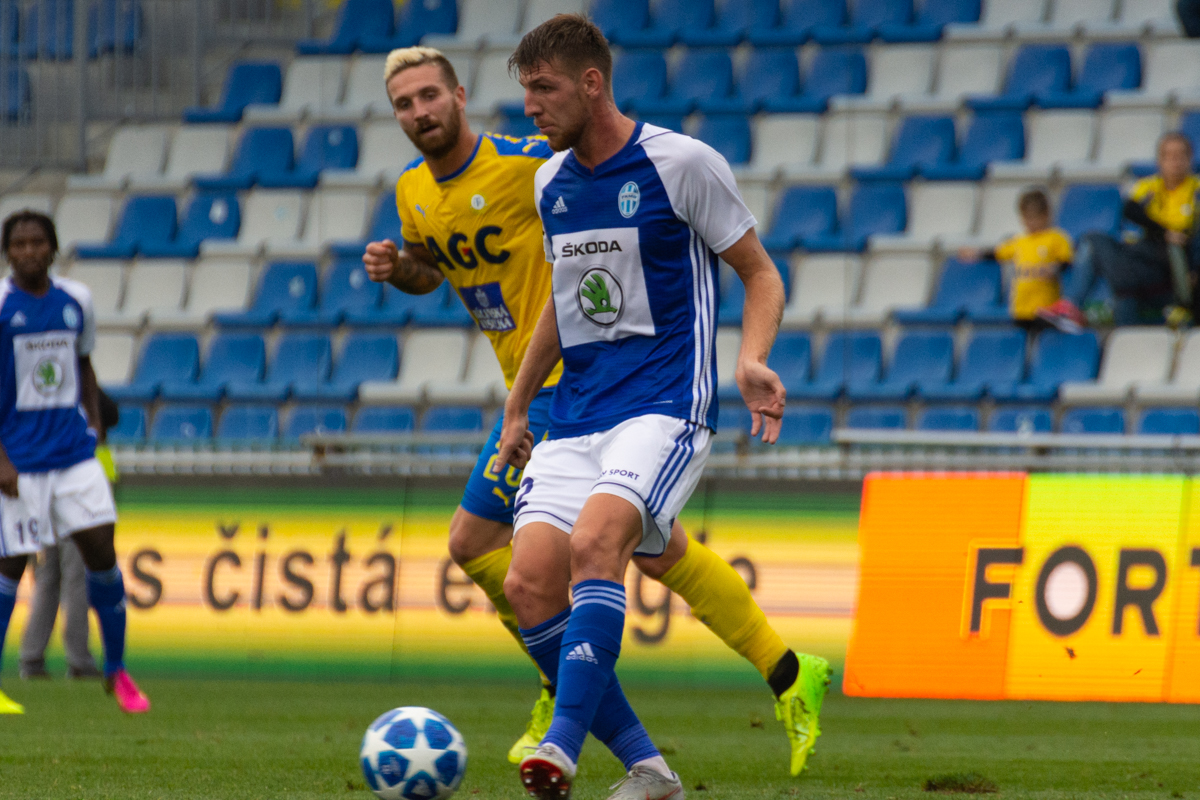

Personal information
- Date of birth: 15 July 1996 (age 30)
- Place of birth: Františkovy Lázně, Czech Republic
- Height: 1.93 m (6 ft 4 in)
- Position: Defensive midfielder

Team information
- Current team: Teplice
- Number: 22

Youth career
- Baník Sokolov
- Teplice

Senior career*
Years	Team	Apps	(Gls)
2014–2015	Teplice	25	(1)
2015	→ Baník Sokolov (loan)	12	(2)
2016–2019	Mladá Boleslav	93	(9)
2019	→ Slavia Prague (loan)	5	(1)
2020–2022	Slavia Prague	16	(1)
2021	→ Mladá Boleslav (loan)	11	(2)
2022	→ Baník Ostrava (loan)	5	(1)
2022–2024	Baník Ostrava	6	(0)
2024–	Teplice	17	(1)
2024–	Teplice B	5	(1)

International career
2014	Czech Republic U18	13	(3)
2014	Czech Republic U19	6	(1)
2015–2017	Czech Republic U20	9	(1)
2014–2018	Czech Republic U21	16	(2)
- * Club domestic league appearances and goals as of 27 May 2026

Ladislav "Laco" Takács (born 15 July 1996) is a Czech professional footballer who plays as a defensive midfielder for Teplice.

== Career ==
He made his league debut on 10 March 2014 in Teplice's 1–0 Czech First League home win against Slavia Prague. He moved to Mladá Boleslav in 2016.

== Career statistics ==
As of 16 July 2020

Club	Season	League			Cup		Continental		Other		Total	
Club	Season	Division	Apps	Goals	Apps	Goals	Apps	Goals	Apps	Goals	Apps	Goals
Teplice	2013–14	Czech First League	4	0	0	0	—		—		4	0
Teplice	2014–15	Czech First League	21	1	2	1	—		—		23	2
Teplice	Total		25	1	2	1	—		—		27	2
Baník Sokolov (loan)	2015–16	Czech National Football League	12	2	1	0	—		—		13	2
Mladá Boleslav	2015–16	Czech First League	13	1	5	1	—		—		18	2
Mladá Boleslav	2016–17	Czech First League	23	1	1	0	2	0	—		26	1
Mladá Boleslav	2017–18	Czech First League	18	0	4	0	0	0	—		22	0
Mladá Boleslav	2018–19	Czech First League	32	6	2	0	—		—		34	6
Mladá Boleslav	2019–20	Czech First League	7	1	—		4	0	—		11	1
Mladá Boleslav	Total		93	9	12	1	6	0	—		111	10
Slavia Prague (loan)	2019–20	Czech First League	5	1	0	0	2	0	—		7	1
Slavia Prague	2019–20	Czech First League	8	0	—		—		—		8	0
Slavia Prague	2020–21	Czech First League	6	1	0	0	1	0	—		7	1
Slavia Prague	Total		14	1	0	0	1	0	0	0	15	1
Mladá Boleslav (loan)	2020–21	Czech First League	11	1	2	1	—		—		13	2
Career total			160	14	17	3	9	0	0	0	186	18
