= Rafael Tavares (footballer, born 2000) =

Brazilian footballer

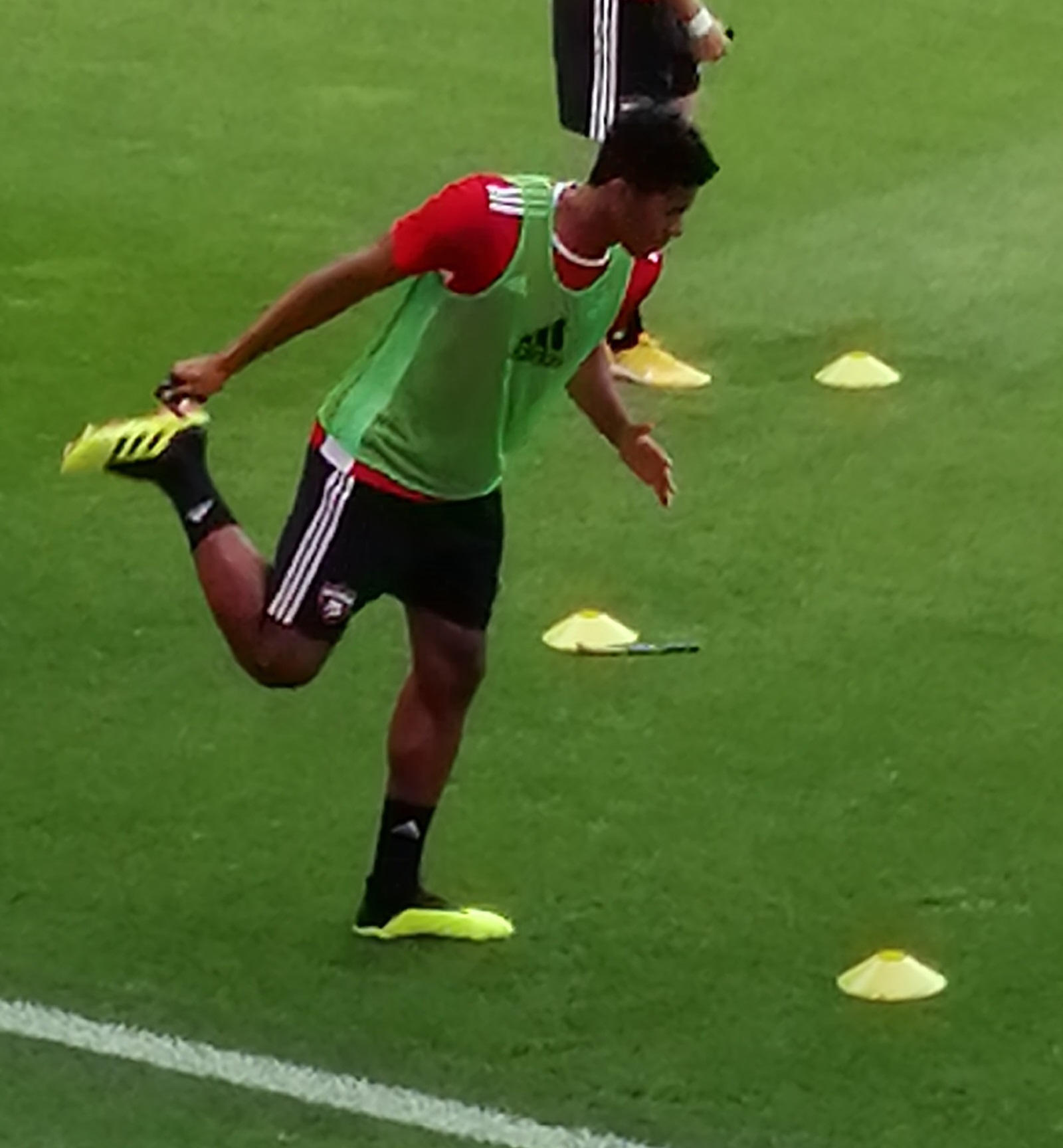

Personal information
- Full name: Rafael Tavares dos Santos
- Date of birth: 26 June 2000 (age 26)
- Place of birth: Porto Seguro, Brazil
- Height: 1.86 m (6 ft 1 in)
- Positions: Forward; winger

Team information
- Current team: Khorazm
- Number: 10

Youth career
- Capivariano
- 2018–2019: → Spartak Trnava (loan)

Senior career*
Years	Team	Apps	(Gls)
2019–2024	Capivariano	0	(0)
2019–2020	→ Spartak Trnava (loan)	31	(2)
2020–2022	→ Karviná (loan)	21	(3)
2023	→ Vlašim (loan)	7	(0)
2024	→ Hercílio Luz (loan)	3	(0)
2024–2026	Gloria Bistrița	24	(4)
2026–	Khorazm	2	(0)
- * Club domestic league appearances and goals as of 25 August 2026

Rafael Tavares dos Santos (born 26 June 2000) is a Brazilian footballer who plays as a forward or winger for Uzbekistan Super League club Khorazm.

== Club career ==
=== Spartak Trnava ===
Tavares joined Spartak Trnava on loan in August 2018, initially starting in the U19 youth team. Later on, he broke to the first-team and made his professional Fortuna Liga debut against Dunajská Streda on 23 February 2019, coming on as a stoppage time replacement for a former Slovak international, David Depetris.

=== Khorazm ===
On 10 August 2026, he signed a one year contract with the Uzbekistan Super League club Khorazm.

== Honours ==
Spartak Trnava

- Slovnaft Cup: 2018–19
