= Lukáš Masopust =

Czech footballer (born 1993)

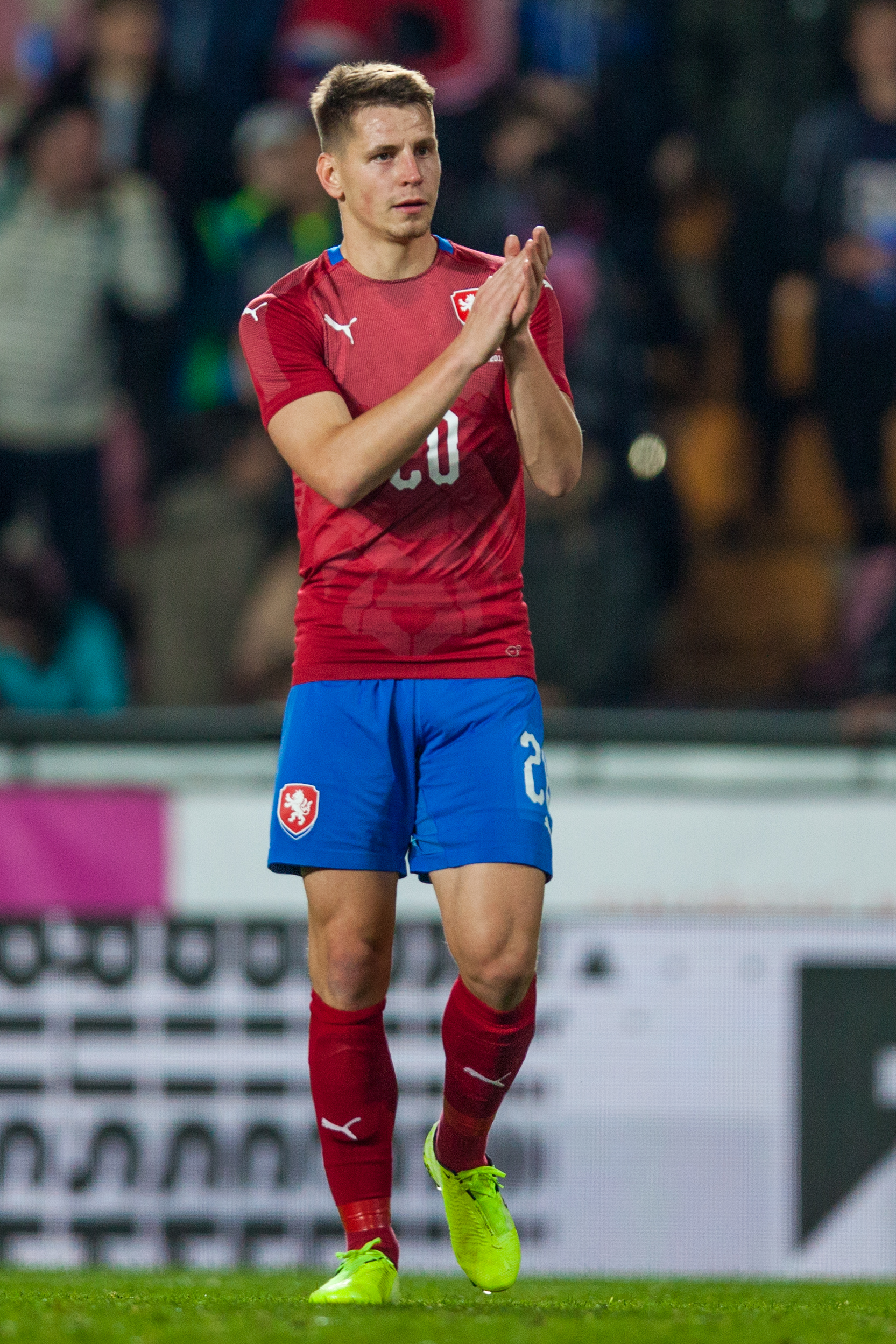
- Masopust with the Czech Republic in 2019

Personal information
- Date of birth: 12 February 1993 (age 33)
- Place of birth: Božejov, Czech Republic
- Height: 1.79 m (5 ft 10 in)
- Positions: Right winger; right-back

Team information
- Current team: Slovan Liberec
- Number: 26

Youth career
- 2004–2012: Vysočina Jihlava

Senior career*
Years	Team	Apps	(Gls)
2012–2015	Vysočina Jihlava	55	(7)
2015–2018	Jablonec	94	(14)
2019–2025	Slavia Prague	126	(14)
2025	→ Slovan Liberec (loan)	8	(1)
2025–	Slovan Liberec	26	(0)

International career^{‡}
2012–2013	Czech Republic U-20	3	(0)
2013–2015	Czech Republic U-21	2	(0)
2018–	Czech Republic	34	(2)
- * Club domestic league appearances and goals as of 26 May 2026 ‡ National team caps and goals as of 20 November 2023

Lukáš Masopust (born 12 February 1993) is a Czech football player who currently plays as a right winger or right-back for Czech First League club Slovan Liberec and the Czech Republic national team.

== Club career ==
=== Early career ===
Masopust was born in the town of Božejov, near Pelhřimov. He began his football career there, before moving to Kamenice nad Lipou and then to Jihlava in 2004. In 2012, Jihlava manager František Komňacký promoted him to the senior team and he went on to make his debut for the club against Slavia Prague that year. The match ended in a 3–3, to which Masopust contributed two assists.

In December 2014, Masopust reached an agreement to join Jablonec on 1 January 2015, on a contract running until 1 July 2018. He made his debut for the club against 1. FC Slovácko on 20 February 2015, coming on as a 75th-minute substitute for Nermin Crnkić.

=== Slavia Prague ===
On 18 December 2018, Slavia Prague announced the signing of Masopust from Jablonec on a three-and-a-half-year contract. On 22 May 2019, Masopust scored Slavia's second goal in their 2–0 defeat of Baník Ostrava in the 2019 Czech Cup Final. On 20 August 2019, Masopust scored in Slavia Prague's UEFA Champions League first leg play-off win against Romanian side CFR Cluj. Slavia would win the second leg as well to qualify for the group stage of Europe's premier knock-out competition for just the second time in their history.

Masopust started for Slavia in the final of the Czech Cup on 20 May 2021, but was replaced by 19-year-old teammate Abdallah Sima in the 60th minute. Sima would go on to score the only goal of the game against Viktoria Plzeň as Slavia won the league and cup double. In the final match of the league season on 29 May 2021, Slavia defeated Dynamo České Budějovice to clinch an undefeated record in the league. It was the first time a Czech club reached this milestone since rivals Sparta Prague did so in 2009–10.

=== Slovan Liberec ===
On 26 June 2025, Masopust signed a contract with Slovan Liberec until 2028.

== International career ==
Masopust was called up to the Czech senior squad for the first time in March 2018. He played on 26 March 2018 in a friendly match against China.

On 25 May 2021, Masopust was included in the final 26-man squad for the postponed UEFA Euro 2020 tournament. In the final warm-up match before the tournament on 8 June, Masopust scored as the Czechs defeated Albania 3–1.

== Career statistics ==
=== Club ===
As of match played 9 November 2023

Club	Season	League			Czech Cup		Europe		Other		Total	
Club	Season	Division	Apps	Goals	Apps	Goals	Apps	Goals	Apps	Goals	Apps	Goals
Vysočina Jihlava	2012–13	Czech First League	29	1	0	0	—		—		29	1
Vysočina Jihlava	2013–14	Czech First League	23	5	2	0	—		—		25	5
Vysočina Jihlava	2014–15	Czech First League	3	1	0	0	—		—		3	1
Vysočina Jihlava	Total		55	7	2	0	—		—		57	7
Jablonec	2014–15	Czech First League	11	1	4	0	—		—		15	1
Jablonec	2015–16	Czech First League	26	5	6	0	3 (Note: Appearances in UEFA Europa League)	0	—		35	5
Jablonec	2016–17	Czech First League	19	0	1	0	—		—		20	0
Jablonec	2017–18	Czech First League	25	4	6	2	—		—		31	6
Jablonec	2018–19	Czech First League	13	4	1	0	3	0	—		17	4
Jablonec	Total		94	14	18	2	6	0	—		118	16
Slavia Prague	2018–19	Czech First League	12	4	2	2	5	0	—		19	6
Slavia Prague	2019–20	Czech First League	27	6	1	0	8 (Note: Appearances in UEFA Champions League)	1	1 (Note: Appearance in Czechoslovak Supercup)	0	37	7
Slavia Prague	2020–21	Czech First League	26	2	5	0	14 (Note: Two appearances in UEFA Champions League, twelve appearances in UEFA Europa League)	0	—		45	2
Slavia Prague	2021–22	Czech First League	18	0	2	0	10 (Note: Two appearances and one goal in UEFA Champions League, one appearance and one goal in UEFA Europa League, seven appearances in UEFA Europa Conference League)	2	—		30	2
Slavia Prague	2022–23	Czech First League	19	2	3	1	8 (Note: Appearances in UEFA Europa Conference League)	1	—		30	4
Slavia Prague	2023–24	Czech First League	11	0	1	0	8	3	—		20	3
Slavia Prague	Total		113	14	14	3	50	9	1	0	181	24
Career total			262	35	34	5	59	9	1	0	356	47

=== International ===
Scores and results list the Czech Republic's goal tally first.

No.	Date	Venue	Opponent	Score	Result	Competition
1.	10 September 2019	Podgorica City Stadium, Podgorica, Montenegro	Montenegro	2–0	3–0	UEFA Euro 2020 qualification
2.	8 June 2021	Stadion Letná, Prague, Czech Republic	Albania	2–1	3–1	Friendly

== Honours ==
=== Club ===
Slavia Prague

- Czech First League: 2018–19, 2019–20, 2020–21
- Czech Cup: 2018–19, 2020–21, 2022–23
