= Milan Králíček =

Czech footballer

Personal information
- Date of birth: 18 July 2001 (age 25)
- Position: Forward

Team information
- Current team: Slovan Liberec
- Number: 20

Youth career
- –2019: Hradec Králové
- 2019–2020: Slovan Liberec

Senior career*
Years	Team	Apps	(Gls)
2020–	Slovan Liberec	3	(1)

International career
2016–2017	Czech Republic U16	10	(6)
2017	Czech Republic U17	2	(1)
- * Club domestic league appearances and goals as of 27 July 2022

Milan Králíček (born 18 July 2001) is a Czech footballer who currently plays as a forward for Slovan Liberec.

== Career statistics ==
=== Club ===
As of 9 July 2020.

Club	Season	League			Cup		Continental		Other		Total	
Club	Season	Division	Apps	Goals	Apps	Goals	Apps	Goals	Apps	Goals	Apps	Goals
Slovan Liberec	2019–20	Czech First League	2	1	0	0	–		0	0	2	1
Career total			2	1	0	0	0	0	0	0	2	1
