= João Felipe (footballer, born 2001) =

Brazilian footballer

Personal information
- Full name: João Felipe Silva Estevam Aguiar
- Date of birth: 24 June 2001 (age 25)
- Place of birth: Cruzeiro, São Paulo, Brazil
- Height: 1.70 m (5 ft 7 in)
- Position: Forward

Youth career
- Desportivo Brasil
- –2019: Ituano
- 2019: → Palmeiras (loan)

Senior career*
Years	Team	Apps	(Gls)
2019–2021	Slavia Prague	1	(0)
2021-2022	SK Rakovník	4	(2)
2022	Azuriz	3	(0)
- * Club domestic league appearances and goals as of 27 May 2022

João Felipe Silva Estevam Aguiar (born 24 June 2001) is a Brazilian footballer who plays as forward. He is currently free agent.

== Career ==
=== Club ===
On 6 September 2020, Slavia Prague announced the signing of João Felipe on a four-year contract from Palmeiras.

== Career statistics ==
=== Club ===
As of match played 28 June 2020.

Club	Season	League			Cup		Continental		Other		Total	
Club	Season	Division	Apps	Goals	Apps	Goals	Apps	Goals	Apps	Goals	Apps	Goals
Slavia Prague	2019–20	Fortuna liga	1	0	1	1	0	0	0	0	2	1
Career total			1	0	1	1	0	0	0	0	2	1
