= Ondřej Žežulka =

Czech footballer

Personal information
- Date of birth: 25 September 1998 (age 28)
- Place of birth: Czech Republic
- Height: 1.84 m (6 ft 0 in)
- Positions: Centre back; defensive midfielder

Team information
- Current team: Viagem Ústí nad Labem
- Number: 21

Youth career
- Slavia Prague

Senior career*
Years	Team	Apps	(Gls)
2017–2020	Slavia Prague	0	(0)
2017–2018	→ Olympia Prague (loan)	15	(3)
2018–2019	→ Viktoria Žižkov (loan)	23	(1)
2019	→ Slavoj Vyšehrad (loan)	8	(0)
2020–2023	Viktoria Žižkov	67	(1)
2023	→ FC Slovan Velvary (loan)	15	(11)
2024	FC Slovan Velvary	15	(2)
2024–	Viagem Ústí nad Labem	31	(2)

International career
2013–2014	Czech Republic U16	9	(1)
2014–2015	Czech Republic U17	17	(2)
2015–2016	Czech Republic U18	5	(0)
- * Club domestic league appearances and goals as of 15 June 2025

Ondřej Žežulka (born 25 September 1998) is a professional Czech football player, currently playing for Viagem Ústí nad Labem as a centre back or defensive midfielder.

== Career ==
He made his senior league debut for Olympia Prague on 29 July 2017 in a Czech National Football League 1–0 home win against Pardubice. He scored his first goal on 12 August in their 2–2 home draw against Žižkov.
