= 2020–21 SK Slavia Prague season =

Slavia Prague
2020–21 season
- President: Jaroslav Tvrdík
- Head coach: Jindřich Trpišovský
- Stadium: Eden Arena
- Czech First League: 1st
- Czech Cup: Winners
- Champions League: Play-off round
- UEFA Europa League: Quarter-finals
- Top goalscorer: League: Jan Kuchta (15); All: Jan Kuchta (20)
Home colours	Away colours

The 2020–21 SK Slavia Prague season was the club's 28th season in the Czech First League. Slavia were reigning League champions, and participated in the Czech First League, Czech Cup, and the UEFA Champions League. Slavia won both the title and the cup, and also reached the quarter-finals of the UEFA Europa League.

In the final match of the league season on 29 May 2021, Slavia defeated Dynamo České Budějovice to clinch an undefeated record in the league. It was the first time a Czech club reached this milestone since rivals Sparta Prague did so in 2009–10.

== Season events ==
On 3 August, it was announced that Slavia's friendly matches in Austria between 5 August and 14 August, would be played without fans in the stands due to the COVID-19 pandemic in Austria. On 11 August, Slavia's pre-season tour in Austria was ended prematurely after one of Slavia's players tested positive for COVID-19. The team will be placed into a two-weeks quarantine and may not be able to play the first league match against České Budějovice on 23 August.

On 17 August, Slavia announced that the entire 61-member squad was tested negative for the COVID-19. On this day, the league FA also released updates in the COVID manual and the team has been released from the quarantine. In line with the manual, the team may resume its training and get ready for a match-week 1.

As a result of Bayern Munich reaching the final of the 2019–20 UEFA Champions League, Slavia was promoted from the 3rd qualification round to the play-off round of the 2020–21 UEFA Champions League as Lyon now were unable to qualify for European competition.

On 20 August, at the pre-season press conference, the club announced the design of the 2020–21 home and away kit. The chairman Jaroslav Tvrdík also set goals for the upcoming season, a championship three-peat (winning the title for a third consecutive time) and a 2020–21 UEFA Champions League group-stage presence.

On 8 October, the Fortuna liga was postponed, initially until 25 October, but then extended until 3 November.

On 16 December, Slavia's games against Fastav Zlín, scheduled for the same day, was postponed due to COVID-19.

On 18 March, Slavia defender Ondřej Kúdela was accused of racially abusing Rangers midfielder Glen Kamara during a Europa League knockout match. Kúdela and Slavia resolutely denied the accusation. Slavia alleged Kúdela was assaulted after the match and the club lodged a criminal complaint. On 14 April, Kúdela was officially found guilty of racial abuse by UEFA and was banned for ten UEFA matches, ruling him out of Slavia's remaining Europa League matches and Euro 2020.

=== Transfers ===
On 17 July, Slavia announced the signing of Ondřej Karafiát from Slovan Liberec, to a four-year contract.

On 24 July, Tomáš Souček completed a permanent transfer to West Ham United where he had been on loan since January 2020, and Josef Hušbauer signed with Anorthosis Famagusta.

On 27 July, Slavia announced the signing of Michal Beran and Tomáš Malinský from Slovan Liberec, to a four-year and three-year contract respectively. On the same day, Jakub Jugas, Jan Matoušek and Daniel Kosek all were loaned to Slovan Liberec.

On 31 July, Alexandru Baluta signed with Puskás Akadémia.

On 5 August, Slavia announced the signing of Ondřej Lingr, to a four-year contract from MFK Karviná, and the permanent signing of Mohamed Tijani from Vysočina Jihlava after he'd spent the first half of 2020 on loan at Slavia.

On 9 August, Slavia announced a new three-year contract for Jan Bořil and a new four-year contract for Vladimír Coufal.

On 18 August, coach Jindřich Trpišovský has extended his contract by three years, until the summer of 2023 with an option for a two-year renewal. The speculation is that his remuneration will be CZK 1.3-1.4 million per month net of taxes with an additional bonus CZK 100,000 bonus for each achieved point in the league table. Also on 18 August, Martin Vantruba moved to Nordsjælland on loan for the season.

On 24 August, Michal Beran headed back to Slovan Liberec on a season-long loan deal. On the same day, Jan Sýkora left the team after a three-year spell for the Polish Ekstraklasa runner-up Lech Poznan.

On 25 August, Patrik Hellebrand was loaned back to 1. FC Slovácko on a season-long loan deal, with Slavia retaining the right to recall him in the winter transfer window.

On 31 August, Mick van Buren was loaned to České Budějovice for six months.

On 7 September, goalkeeper Jakub Markovič joined Mladá Boleslav on loan for the season, with fellow goalkeeper Jan Stejskal joining Slavia on a similar deal. On the say day, former player Miroslav Stoch began training with the club.

On 16 September, Michal Frydrych left Slavia to join Wisła Kraków.

On 25 September, Daniel Langhamer left Slavia to sign for Mladá Boleslav, with Slavia retaining a buy-back option.

On 1 October, Vladimír Coufal left Slavia to join West Ham United.

On 19 December, Slavia announced that Peter Olayinka had extended his contract with the club until June 2023.

On 3 January, Ondřej Karafiát returned to Slovan Liberec on loan for the remainder of the season, whilst Patrik Hellebrand moved on loan Opava after his previous loan deal with 1. FC Slovácko ended and Jan Stejskal and Jakub Markovič both had their loans cut short.

On 5 January, Slavia announced the signing of Alexander Bah on a four-and-a-half-year contract, with Taras Kacharaba signing on loan from Slovan Liberec the next day with an option to make the move permanent.

On 20 January, Jakub Markovič moved to Vlašim on loan for the remainder of the season.

On 1 February, Petar Musa joined Union Berlin on loan for the remainder of the season, whilst Simon Deli returned to Slavia on a similar deal from Club Brugge.

== Squad ==
As of match played 29 May 2021

No.	Name	Nationality	Position	Date of birth (age)	Signed from	Signed in	Contract ends	Apps.	Goals
Goalkeepers
1	Ondřej Kolář	(Czech Republic)	GK	17 October 1994 (aged 26)	Slovan Liberec	2018		154	1
13	Jan Stejskal	(Czech Republic)	GK	14 February 1997 (aged 24)	Mladá Boleslav	2021		3	0
31	Přemysl Kovář	(Czech Republic)	GK	14 October 1985 (aged 35)	Cherno More	2017		16	0
34	Matyáš Vágner	(Czech Republic)	GK	5 February 2003 (aged 18)	Academy	2020		3	0
Defenders
2	David Hovorka	(Czech Republic)	DF	7 August 1993 (aged 27)	Jablonec	2019		27	1
3	Tomáš Holeš	(Czech Republic)	DF	31 March 1993 (aged 28)	Jablonec	2019		56	9
4	Simon Deli	(Ivory Coast)	DF	27 October 1991 (aged 29)	on loan from Club Brugge	2021		144	3
5	Alexander Bah	(Denmark)	DF	9 December 1997 (aged 23)	SønderjyskE	2021		26	1
6	David Zima	(Czech Republic)	DF	8 November 2000 (aged 20)	Sigma Olomouc	2020		47	1
15	Ondřej Kúdela	(Czech Republic)	DF	26 March 1987 (aged 34)	Slovan Liberec	2018		123	11
18	Jan Bořil	(Czech Republic)	DF	11 January 1991 (aged 30)	Mladá Boleslav	2016		204	11
30	Taras Kacharaba	(Ukraine)	DF	7 January 1995 (aged 26)	on loan from Slovan Liberec	2021		12	0
39	Daniel Samek	(Czech Republic)	DF	19 February 2004 (aged 17)	Hradec Králové	2018		3	0
Midfielders
7	Nicolae Stanciu	(Romania)	MF	7 May 1993 (aged 28)	Al Ahli	2019		86	20
9	Peter Olayinka	(Nigeria)	MF	18 November 1995 (aged 25)	Gent	2018		106	22
17	Lukáš Provod	(Czech Republic)	MF	23 October 1996 (aged 24)	Viktoria Plzeň	2020		65	7
19	Oscar Dorley	(Liberia)	MF	19 July 1998 (aged 22)	Slovan Liberec	2019		47	2
20	Michal Beran	(Czech Republic)	MF	22 August 2000 (aged 20)	Slovan Liberec	2020		8	0
23	Petr Ševčík	(Czech Republic)	MF	2 May 1994 (aged 27)	Slovan Liberec	2019		68	9
25	Jakub Hromada	(Slovakia)	MF	25 May 1996 (aged 25)	Sampdoria	2017		46	1
27	Ibrahim Traoré	(Ivory Coast)	MF	16 September 1988 (aged 32)	Fastav Zlín	2019		103	8
28	Lukáš Masopust	(Czech Republic)	MF	12 February 1993 (aged 28)	Jablonec	2019		100	15
32	Ondřej Lingr	(Czech Republic)	MF	7 October 1998 (aged 22)	Karviná	2020		44	8
37	Matouš Nikl	(Czech Republic)	MF	2 February 2002 (aged 19)	1. FK Příbram	2021		1	0
40	Tomáš Rigo	(Slovakia)	MF	3 July 2002 (aged 18)	Ružomberok	2018		3	0
Forwards
11	Stanislav Tecl	(Czech Republic)	FW	1 September 1990 (aged 30)	Jablonec	2017		103	22
12	Abdallah Sima	(Senegal)	FW	17 June 2001 (aged 19)	MAS Táborsko	2020		33	16
14	Mick van Buren	(Netherlands)	FW	24 August 1992 (aged 28)	Esbjerg	2016		97	16
16	Jan Kuchta	(Czech Republic)	FW	8 January 1997 (aged 24)	Slovan Liberec	2020		41	20
29	Abdulla Yusuf Helal	(Bahrain)	FW	12 June 1993 (aged 27)	Bohemians 1905	2019		31	3
41	Denis Višinský	(Czech Republic)	FW	21 March 2003 (aged 18)	Academy	2021		4	2
Slavia B
42	Jakub Zeronik	(Czech Republic)	MF	11 February 2001 (aged 20)	Academy	2019		0	0
	Jan Sirotník	(Czech Republic)	GK	16 February 2002 (aged 19)	Academy	2019		0	0
	Libor Drozda	(Czech Republic)	DF	3 October 2000 (aged 20)	Academy	2018		0	0
	Lukáš Veselý	(Czech Republic)	MF	11 April 1997 (aged 24)	Academy	2016		0	0
	João Felipe	(Brazil)	FW	24 June 2001 (aged 19)	Palmeiras	2021		2	1
Away on loan
4	Ondřej Karafiát	(Czech Republic)	DF	1 December 1994 (aged 26)	Slovan Liberec	2020		7	0
12	Jaroslav Zelený	(Czech Republic)	DF	20 August 1992 (aged 28)	Jablonec	2018		30	1
13	Patrik Hellebrand	(Czech Republic)	MF	16 May 1999 (aged 22)	1. Slovácko	2020		10	0
24	Laco Takács	(Czech Republic)	DF	15 July 1996 (aged 24)	Mladá Boleslav	2020		22	2
26	Tomáš Malínský	(Czech Republic)	MF	25 August 1991 (aged 29)	Slovan Liberec	2020		7	0
33	Petar Musa	(Croatia)	FW	4 March 1998 (aged 23)	Inter Zaprešić	2017		35	11
37	Matěj Jurásek	(Czech Republic)	MF	30 August 2003 (aged 17)	Academy	2021		0	0
39	Jakub Křišťan	(Czech Republic)	MF	5 July 2002 (aged 18)	Academy	2020		0	0
	Jakub Markovič	(Czech Republic)	GK	13 July 2001 (aged 19)	Academy	2019		3	0
	Martin Otáhal	(Czech Republic)	GK	29 May 1996 (aged 25)	Academy	2015		0	0
	Martin Vantruba	(Slovakia)	GK	7 February 1998 (aged 23)	Spartak Trnava	2018		0	0
	Jakub Jugas	(Czech Republic)	DF	5 May 1992 (aged 29)	Fastav Zlín	2017		43	1
	Daniel Kosek	(Czech Republic)	DF	19 May 2001 (aged 20)	Academy	2019		2	0
	Lukáš Pokorný	(Czech Republic)	DF	5 July 1993 (aged 27)	Montpellier	2018		6	0
	Filip Prebsl	(Czech Republic)	DF	4 March 2003 (aged 18)	Academy	2020		0	0
	Tomáš Vlček	(Czech Republic)	DF	28 February 2001 (aged 20)	Academy	2019		2	0
	Mohamed Tijani	(Ivory Coast)	DF	10 July 1997 (aged 23)	Vysočina Jihlava	2020		2	0
	Lukáš Červ	(Czech Republic)	MF	10 April 2001 (aged 20)	Academy	2020		1	0
	Jan Matoušek	(Czech Republic)	MF	9 May 1998 (aged 23)	1. FK Příbram	2018		13	1
	Vojtěch Šilhan	(Czech Republic)	MF	21 March 2000 (aged 21)	Teplice	2018		0	0
	Michal Vaněk	(Czech Republic)	MF	19 September 2000 (aged 20)	Academy	2018		1	0
	Jan Vejvar	(Czech Republic)	MF	9 March 1998 (aged 23)	Academy	2018		1	0
	Matěj Vít	(Czech Republic)	MF	22 June 2001 (aged 19)	Academy	2019		0	0
Players who left during the season
5	Vladimír Coufal	(Czech Republic)	DF	22 August 1992 (aged 28)	Slovan Liberec	2018		88	7
25	Michal Frydrych	(Czech Republic)	DF	27 February 1990 (aged 31)	Baník Ostrava	2015		137	16
	Daniel Langhamer	(Czech Republic)	MF	20 March 2003 (aged 18)	Academy	2020		0	0

=== Out on loan ===
Note: Flags indicate national team as defined under FIFA eligibility rules; some limited exceptions apply. Players may hold more than one non-FIFA nationality.

No.	Pos.	Nation	Player
4	DF	CZE	Ondřej Karafiát (at Slovan Liberec)
12	DF	CZE	Jaroslav Zelený (at Jablonec)
13	MF	CZE	Patrik Hellebrand (at Opava)
24	DF	CZE	Laco Takács (at Mladá Boleslav)
26	MF	CZE	Tomáš Malínský (at Mladá Boleslav)
33	FW	CRO	Petar Musa (at Union Berlin)
37	FW	CZE	Matěj Jurásek (at Vlašim)
39	MF	CZE	Jakub Křišťan (at Vlašim)
—	GK	CZE	Jakub Markovič (at Vlašim)
—	GK	CZE	Martin Otáhal (at Slavoj Vyšehrad)
—	DF	CZE	Libor Drozda (at Slovan Velvary)
—	DF	CZE	Jakub Jugas (at Slovan Liberec)

No.	Pos.	Nation	Player
—	DF	CZE	Daniel Kosek (at Bohemians 1905)
—	DF	CZE	Lukáš Pokorný (at Bohemians 1905)
—	DF	CZE	Filip Prebsl (at Viktoria Žižkov)
—	DF	CZE	Tomáš Vlček (at Vysočina Jihlava)
—	DF	CIV	Mohamed Tijani (at Slovan Liberec)
—	MF	CZE	Lukáš Červ (at Vysočina Jihlava)
—	MF	CZE	Jan Matoušek (at Slovan Liberec)
—	MF	CZE	Vojtěch Šilhan (at Varnsdorf)
—	MF	CZE	Michal Vaněk (at Vyšehrad)
—	MF	CZE	Jan Vejvar (at Slavoj Vyšehrad)
—	MF	CZE	Matěj Vít (at Pardubice)

== Transfers ==
=== In ===
Date	Position	Nationality	Name	From	Fee	Ref.
17 July 2020	DF	(Czech Republic)	Ondřej Karafiát	Slovan Liberec	Free	
27 July 2020	MF	(Czech Republic)	Michal Beran	Slovan Liberec	Undisclosed	
27 July 2020	MF	(Czech Republic)	Tomáš Malinský	Slovan Liberec	Undisclosed	
3 August 2020	FW	(Senegal)	Abdallah Sima	MAS Táborsko	Undisclosed	
5 August 2020	DF	(Ivory Coast)	Mohamed Tijani	Vysočina Jihlava	Undisclosed	
5 August 2020	FW	(Czech Republic)	Ondřej Lingr	MFK Karviná	Undisclosed	
5 January 2021	DF	(Denmark)	Alexander Bah	SønderjyskE	Undisclosed	

=== Loans in ===
Date from	Position	Nationality	Name	From	Date to	Ref.
7 September 2020	GK	(Czech Republic)	Jan Stejskal	Mladá Boleslav	31 December 2020	
6 January 2021	DF	(Ukraine)	Taras Kacharaba	Slovan Liberec	End of season	
1 February 2021	DF	(Ivory Coast)	Simon Deli	Club Brugge	End of season	

=== Out ===
Date	Position	Nationality	Name	To	Fee	Ref.
24 July 2020	MF	(Czech Republic)	Tomáš Souček	West Ham United	Undisclosed	
24 July 2020	MF	(Czech Republic)	Josef Hušbauer	Anorthosis Famagusta	Undisclosed	
31 July 2020	MF	(Romania)	Alexandru Baluta	Puskás Akadémia	Undisclosed	
3 August 2020	MF	(Czech Republic)	Matěj Valenta	České Budějovice	Undisclosed	
15 August 2020	DF	(Czech Republic)	Vojtěch Mareš	FSV Union Fürstenwalde	Undisclosed	
16 September 2020	DF	(Czech Republic)	Michal Frydrych	Wisła Kraków	Undisclosed	
25 September 2020	MF	(Czech Republic)	Daniel Langhamer	Mladá Boleslav	Undisclosed	
1 October 2020	DF	(Czech Republic)	Vladimír Coufal	West Ham United	Undisclosed	

=== Loans out ===
Date from	Position	Nationality	Name	To	Date to	Ref.
20 February 2019	MF	(Czech Republic)	Jan Vejvar	Slavoj Vyšehrad	End of season	
1 February 2019	GK	(Czech Republic)	Martin Otáhal	Slavoj Vyšehrad	End of Season	
30 July 2019	DF	(Czech Republic)	Lukáš Pokorný	Bohemians 1905	End of season	
27 July 2020	DF	(Czech Republic)	Jakub Jugas	Slovan Liberec		
27 July 2020	DF	(Czech Republic)	Daniel Kosek	Slovan Liberec	31 December 2020	
27 July 2020	MF	(Czech Republic)	Jan Matoušek	Slovan Liberec		
3 August 2020	DF	(Czech Republic)	Lukáš Červ	Vysočina Jihlava	End of season	
3 August 2020	DF	(Czech Republic)	Tomáš Vlček	Vysočina Jihlava	End of season	
4 August 2020	FW	(Bahrain)	Abdulla Yusuf Helal	Slovan Liberec	31 December 2020	
7 August 2020	DF	(Ivory Coast)	Mohamed Tijani	Slovan Liberec	End of season	
10 August 2020	MF	(Slovakia)	Jakub Hromada	Slovan Liberec	31 December 2020	
14 August 2020	DF	(Czech Republic)	Libor Drozda	Slovan Velvary	End of season	
18 August 2020	GK	(Slovakia)	Martin Vantruba	Nordsjælland	End of season	
20 August 2020	DF	(Czech Republic)	Jaroslav Zelený	Jablonec	End of season	
24 August 2020	MF	(Czech Republic)	Michal Beran	Slovan Liberec	31 December 2020	
25 August 2020	MF	(Czech Republic)	Patrik Hellebrand	1. FC Slovácko	31 December 2020	
31 August 2020	FW	(Netherlands)	Mick van Buren	České Budějovice	31 December 2020	
7 September 2020	GK	(Czech Republic)	Jakub Markovič	Mladá Boleslav	31 December 2020	
3 January 2021	DF	(Czech Republic)	Ondřej Karafiát	Slovan Liberec	End of season	
3 January 2021	MF	(Czech Republic)	Patrik Hellebrand	Opava	End of season	
13 January 2021	DF	(Czech Republic)	Daniel Kosek	Bohemians 1905	End of season	
20 January 2021	GK	(Czech Republic)	Jakub Markovič	Vlašim	End of season	
1 February 2021	FW	(Croatia)	Petar Musa	Union Berlin	End of season	
8 February 2021	MF	(Czech Republic)	Jakub Kristan	FC Vlašim	End of season	
8 February 2021	FW	(Croatia)	Matej Jurasek	FC Vlašim	End of season	

== Pre-season and friendlies ==
Win Draw Loss Cancelled

5 August 2020	St. Pölten (Austria)	0–5	(Czech Republic) Slavia Prague	Laa an der Thaya, Austria
17:00 CEST (UTC+02:00)		Report	Musa 1'; Holeš 5'; Zima 32'; Malinský 84'; Karafiát 88'	Attendance: 0
Note: Played behind closed doors due to the COVID-19 pandemic in Austria.

8 August 2020	Fehérvár (Hungary)	1–3	(Czech Republic) Slavia Prague	Frauenkirchen, Austria
17:00 CEST (UTC+02:00)	Zivzivadze 9'	Report	Stanciu 48'; Musa 58'; Masopust 63'	Attendance: 0
Note: Played behind closed doors due to the COVID-19 pandemic in Austria.

11 August 2020	Sturm Graz (Austria)	v	(Czech Republic) Slavia Prague	Bad Erlach, Austria
17:00 CEST (UTC+02:00)				Attendance: 0
Note: Match cancelled on 11 August due to a positive COVID-19 test in the Slavia camp.

14 August 2020	Austria Wien	v	(Czech Republic) Slavia Prague	Laa an der Thaya, Austria
16:30 CEST (UTC+02:00)				Attendance: 0
Note: Match cancelled on 11 August due to a positive COVID-19 test in the Slavia camp.

== Competitions ==
=== Overall record ===
Competition	First match	Last match	Starting round	Final position	Record							
Competition	First match	Last match	Starting round	Final position	Pld	W	D	L	GF	GA	GD	Win %
Czech First League	23 August 2020	29 May 2021	Matchday 1	Winners	34	26	8	0	85	20	+65	76.47
Czech Cup	19 January 2021	20 May 2021	Third round	Winners	5	5	0	0	21	4	+17	100.00
UEFA Champions League	22 September 2020	30 September 2020	Play-off round	Play-off round	2	0	1	1	1	4	−3	0.00
UEFA Europa League	22 October 2020	15 April 2021	Group stage	Quarter-finals	12	6	3	3	17	16	+1	50.00
Total					53	37	12	4	124	44	+80	69.81

Source: Soccerway

=== Czech First League ===
==== League table ====
Pos	Team	Pld	W	D	L	GF	GA	GD	Pts	Qualification or relegation
1	Slavia Prague (C)	34	26	8	0	85	20	+65	86	Qualification for the Champions League third qualifying round
2	Sparta Prague	34	23	5	6	82	43	+39	74	Qualification for the Champions League second qualifying round
3	Jablonec	34	21	6	7	59	33	+26	69	Qualification for the Europa League third qualifying round
4	Slovácko	34	19	6	9	58	33	+25	63	Qualification for the Europa Conference League second qualifying round
5	Viktoria Plzeň	34	17	7	10	60	45	+15	58	Qualification for the Europa Conference League second qualifying round

Source: Fortuna Liga
Rules for classification: 1) Points; 2) Head-to-head points; 3) Head-to-head goal difference; 4) Head-to-head goals scored; 5) Goal difference; 6) Goals scored; 7) Fair-play ranking; 8) Draw.
(C) Champions

==== Results summary ====
Overall								Home						Away					
Pld	W	D	L	GF	GA	GD	Pts	W	D	L	GF	GA	GD	W	D	L	GF	GA	GD
34	26	8	0	85	20	+65	86	15	2	0	45	9	+36	11	6	0	40	11	+29

Last updated: 29 May 2021.
Source: See results

==== Results by round ====
Round	1	2	3	4	5	6	7	8	9	10	11	12	13	14	15	16	17	18	19	20	21	22	23	24	25	26	27	28	29	30	31	32	33	34
Ground	A	H	A	H	H	A	H	A	H	A	H	H	A	H	A	A	H	A	H	A	A	H	A	H	A	H	A	H	A	H	A	H	A	H
Result	W	W	D	W	W	W	W	W	D	W	W	W	W	W	W	W	W	D	W	D	W	W	W	W	D	W	W	W	D	W	W	D	D	W
Position	1	1	3	2	2	2	1	1	1	1	1	1	1	1	1	1	1	1	1	1	1	1	1	1	1	1	1	1	1	1	1	1	1	1

Source: See results
A = Away; H = Home; W = Win; D = Draw; L = Loss

==== Matches ====
23 August 2020 1	Dynamo České Budějovice	0–6	Slavia Prague	České Budějovice
16:30 CEST (UTC+02:00)	Šulc (yellow card) 50'	Report	Tecl 1', 26', 64' (yellow card) 37'; Bořil 5'; Masopust 59' (yellow card) 67'; Holeš 86'	Stadium: Stadion Střelecký ostrov Attendance: 1,450; Referee: Miroslav Zelinka

29 August 2020 2	Slavia Prague	3–0	1. FK Příbram	Prague
19:30 CEST (UTC+02:00)	Provod 3'; Bořil 18'; Kúdela (yellow card) 60'; Kolář 90+3' (pen.)	Report	Soldát (yellow card) 9'; Pilík (yellow card) 75'; Kingue (yellow card) 90+2'	Stadium: Sinobo Stadium; Attendance: 4,869; Referee: Ondrej Ginzel

12 September 2020 3	Pardubice	1–1	Slavia Prague	Pardubice
17:00 CEST (UTC+02:00)	E.Tischler 38'; Solil (yellow card) 49'; Černý (yellow card) 50'; J.Prosek (yellow card) 53'; Jeřábek (yellow card) 79'	Report	Hovorka (yellow card) 20'; Stanciu (yellow card) 36'; Musa 51' (yellow card) 90'; Traoré (yellow card) 90'	Stadium: Pod Vinicí; Attendance: 2,671; Referee: Pavel Královec

18 September 2020 4	Slavia Prague	5–1	Teplice	Prague
20:00 CEST (UTC+02:00)	Olayinka 2'; Stanciu 13'; Musa 27'; Holeš 52'; Coufal (yellow card) 61'; Takács 68'; Kuchta (yellow card) 77'	Report	Heidenreich (red card) 20'; Mareš 61' (pen.)	Stadium: Sinobo Stadium; Attendance: 10,185; Referee: Emanuel Marek

26 September 2020 5	Slavia Prague	3–0	Slovácko	Prague
19:00 CEST (UTC+02:00)	Kúdela 2' (pen.), 29', (yellow card) 87'; Provod 90+2'	Report	Hofmann (yellow card) 2'; Navrátil (yellow card) 35'; Kalabiška (yellow card) 38'; Reinberk (yellow card) 75'	Stadium: Sinobo Stadium; Attendance: 2,000; Referee: Pavel Franek

4 October 2020 6	Baník Ostrava	0–1	Slavia Prague	Ostrava
18:00 CEST (UTC+02:00)	Fillo (yellow card) 47'; Laštůvka (yellow card) 66'; Fleišman (yellow card) 74'; Potočný (yellow card) 76'; Tijani (yellow card) 90'	Report	Olayinka (yellow card) 56'; Dorley (yellow card) 65'; Stanciu 69' (pen.); Bořil (yellow card) 90'; Masopust (yellow card) 90+2'	Stadium: Městský stadion Attendance: 2,000; Referee: Karel Hrubes

8 November 2020 7	Slavia Prague	1–0	Mladá Boleslav	Prague
16:00 CEST (UTC+02:00)	Olayinka 7'; Dorley (yellow card) 40'; Sima (yellow card) 88'; Lingr (yellow card) 90+3'	Report		Stadium: Sinobo Stadium; Referee: Pavel Rejžek
Note: Match originally scheduled for 17 October, but postponed due to the COVID-19 pandemic.

21 November 2020 8	Opava	0–6	Slavia Prague	Opava
18:30 CET (UTC+01:00)	Tiéhi (yellow card) 49'; Hrabina (yellow card) 90+1'	Report	Kúdela 34'; Kuchta 53', 58'; Bořil 72'; Sima 80', (yellow card) 89'; Musa 88'	Stadium: Stadion v Městských sadech Referee: Ondřej Ginzel
Note: Match originally scheduled for 25 October, but postponed due to the COVID-19 pandemic.

29 November 2020 9	Slavia Prague	1–1	Zbrojovka Brno	Prague
18:30 CET (UTC+01:00)	Dorley (yellow card) 56'; Musa (yellow card) 65'; Sima 68'	Report	Čermák (yellow card) 48'; Fousek (yellow card) 52'; Moravec (yellow card) 60'; Dreksa (yellow card) 61'; Bariš (yellow card) 85'; Šural 88'	Stadium: Sinobo Stadium; Referee: Karel Hrubeš
Note: Match originally scheduled for 31 October, but postponed due to the COVID-19 pandemic.

6 December 2020 10	Sparta Prague	0–3	Slavia Prague	Prague
18:30 CET (UTC+01:00)	Juliš (penalty missed) 29'; Krejčí II (yellow card) 44'; Pavelka (yellow card) 75'; Souček (yellow card) 86'	Report	Sima 32', 40'; Kúdela (yellow card) 41'; Lingr 53'; Traoré (yellow card) 87'	Stadium: Stadion Letná; Referee: Miroslav Zelinka

13 December 2020 11	Slavia Prague	3–0	Slovan Liberec	Prague
18:30 CET (UTC+01:00)	Sima 23', 75'; Olayinka 45+1'	Report	Sadílek (yellow card) 11'; Helal (yellow card) 27'; Mosquera (yellow card) 68'	Stadium: Sinobo Stadium; Referee: Emanuel Marek

20 December 2020 13	Slavia Prague	2–1	Bohemians 1905	Prague
18:30 CET (UTC+01:00)	Sima 7'; Provod (yellow card) 55', (goal) 66'; Masopust (yellow card) 65'	Report	Dostál (yellow card) 43'; Hronek 68'	Stadium: Sinobo Stadium; Referee: Pavel Franěk

23 December 2020 14	Viktoria Plzeň	0–1	Slavia Prague	Plzeň
17:00 CET (UTC+01:00)	Bucha (yellow card) 13'; Kalvach (yellow card) 39'; Alvir (yellow card) 86'; Limberský (yellow card) 87'; Hejda (yellow card) 90'	Report	Stanciu 26'; Bořil (yellow card) 51'; Provod (yellow card) 55'; Masopust (yellow card) 84'	Stadium: Doosan Arena; Referee: Ondřej Pechanec

16 January 2021 15	Slavia Prague	3–1	Sigma Olomouc	Prague
18:30 CET (UTC+01:00)	Kúdela 19' (pen.); Kuchta (yellow card) 36' (goal) 39', 61'; Hromada (yellow card) 47'	Report	Breite 15'; Vepřek (yellow card) 45'	Stadium: Sinobo Stadium; Referee: Ondřej Berka

23 January 2021 16	Karviná	1–3	Slavia Prague	Karviná
18:30 CET (UTC+01:00)	Smrž (yellow card) 18'; Dramé (yellow card) 48'; Papadopulos (yellow card) 53'; Mendes (yellow card) 77'; Qose 82' (pen.); Bolek (red card) 90+5'	Report	Sima 51'; Kuchta 61'; Olayinka 85'	Stadium: Městský Stadion; Referee: Ondřej Pechanec

27 January 2021 12	Fastav Zlín	2–6	Slavia Prague	Zlín
18:00 CET (UTC+01:00)	Cedidla (yellow card) 39' (goal) 48'; Slovák (yellow card) 72' (yellow-red card) 76'; Poznar 74'	Report	Olayinka 3'; Kuchta 11', 17', 45'; Sima 36'; Musa 89'	Stadium: Letná Stadion; Referee: Pavel Franek
Note: Match originally scheduled for and postponed on 16 December.

31 January 2021 17	Slavia Prague	3–0	Jablonec	Prague
18:30 CET (UTC+01:00)	Sima 19' (yellow card) 55'; Holeš (yellow card) 26'; Kuchta 38'; Martinec 58' (o.g.); Bah (yellow card) 82'	Report		Stadium: Sinobo Stadium; Referee: Pavel Orel

7 February 2021 18	1. FK Příbram	3–3	Slavia Prague	Příbram
16:00 CET (UTC+01:00)	Zima 21' (o.g.); Lalkovič (yellow card) 29'; Vilotić (yellow card) 34'; Kúdela 45+3' (o.g.); Nový (yellow card) 77'; Kvída (yellow card) 82'; Voltr 90+6'	Report	Olayinka 24' (yellow card) 50'; Zima (yellow card) 27'; Sima 55'; Kúdela 81' (pen.); Tecl (yellow card) 90+2'	Stadium: Na Litavce; Referee: Karel Hrubes

13 February 2021 19	Slavia Prague	3–0	Pardubice	Prague
16:00 CET (UTC+01:00)	Sima (yellow card) 18'; Kuchta 19', 27'; Stanciu 53'	Report	Čihák (yellow card) 31'; Čelůstka (yellow card) 39'; Šejvl (yellow card) 47'; Surzyn (yellow card) 83'	Stadium: Sinobo Stadium; Referee: Ondrej Ginzel

21 February 2021 20	Teplice	1–1	Slavia Prague	Teplice
16:30 CET (UTC+01:00)	Heidenreich (yellow card) 8'; Mareš 64'; Vondrášek (yellow card) 80'; Fortelný (yellow card) 84'; Řezníček (yellow card) 88'	Report	Bah (yellow card) 12'; Dorley 43'	Stadium: Na Stínadlech; Referee: Miroslav Zelinka

28 February 2021 21	Slovácko	2–3	Slavia Prague	Uherské Hradiště
16:00 CET (UTC+01:00)	Sadílek 11'; Kadlec 45' (yellow card) 71'; Petržela (yellow card) 62'; Kubala (yellow card) 90+2'	Report	Stanciu 36' (pen.), 72'; Kuchta (yellow card) 54'; Lingr 81' (yellow card) 81'; Kúdela (yellow card) 90+3'	Stadium: Městský fotbalový stadion Referee: Zbynek Proske

7 March 2021 22	Slavia Prague	2–1	Baník Ostrava	Prague
18:30 CET (UTC+01:00)	Masopust 7'; Stanciu 33' (pen.); Lingr (yellow card) 50'; Kuchta (yellow card) 77'	Report	Fillo (red card) 3'; Kacharaba 53' (o.g.); Jánoš (yellow card) 76'; Pokorný (yellow card) 83'	Stadium: Sinobo Stadium; Referee: Ondrej Pechanec

14 March 2021 23	Mladá Boleslav	0–3	Slavia Prague	Mladá Boleslav
18:30 CET (UTC+01:00)	Matějovský (yellow card) 52'; Škoda (yellow card) 55'	Report	Stanciu 27', 40'; Bořil (yellow card) 51'; Sima (yellow card) 68'; Helal 82' (pen.)	Stadium: Lokotrans Aréna; Referee: Pavel Julinek

21 March 2021 24	Slavia Prague	4–0	Opava	Prague
18:30 CET (UTC+01:00)	Sima (red card) 22'; Kuchta 45+4'; Stanciu 53' (pen.); Holeš 64'; Dorley (yellow card) 76', (goal) 78'; Helal (yellow card) 87'	Report	Kulhánek (yellow card) 16' (yellow-red card) 52'; Čvančara (yellow card) 27'; Řezníček (yellow card) 36'; Hrabina (yellow card) 55'; Žídek (yellow card) 74'	Stadium: Sinobo Stadium; Referee: Ondřej Cieslar

4 April 2021 25	Zbrojovka Brno	0–0	Slavia Prague	Brno
18:30 CEST (UTC+02:00)		Report	Vágner (red card) 18'; Bah (yellow card) 46'; Olayinka (yellow card) 76'	Stadium: Městský fotbalový stadion Srbská; Referee: Pavel Orel

11 April 2021 26	Slavia Prague	2–0	Sparta Prague	Prague
18:30 CEST (UTC+02:00)	Stanciu (yellow card) 40'; Holeš 45', (yellow card) 59'; Kuchta (yellow card) 47'; Tecl 81'; Traoré (yellow card) 90+2'	Report	Krejčí II (yellow card) 22'; Dočkal (yellow card) 43'; Vitík (yellow card) 66'; Krejčí (yellow card) 90+3'	Stadium: Sinobo Stadium; Referee: Pavel Franek

18 April 2021 27	Slovan Liberec	0–1	Slavia Prague	Liberec
16:00 CEST (UTC+02:00)	Karafiát (yellow card) 24'; Mara (yellow card) 44'; Sadílek (yellow card) 56'; Rabušic (yellow card) 60'; Pourzitidis (yellow card) 77'; Mosquera (yellow card) 86'	Report	Helal (yellow card) 31'; Hromada (yellow card) 48'; Kúdela 84' (pen.); Van Buren (yellow card) 90+1'	Stadium: Stadion u Nisy; Referee: Karel Hrubeš

21 April 2021 28	Slavia Prague	2–1	Fastav Zlín	Prague
19:30 CEST (UTC+02:00)	Stanciu 29'; Kuchta 50'; Kacharaba (yellow card) 65'	Report	Potočný 7' (pen.); Vraštil (yellow card) 63'	Stadium: Sinobo Stadium; Referee: Ondřej Ginzel

25 April 2021 29	Bohemians 1905	0–0	Slavia Prague	Prague
18:30 CEST (UTC+02:00)	Krch (yellow card) 18'; Bederka (yellow card) 38'; Hronek (yellow card) 77'	Report	Helal (yellow card) 90+1'	Stadium: Ďolíček; Referee: Pavel Julínek

2 May 2021 30	Slavia Prague	5–1	Viktoria Plzeň	Prague
19:30 CEST (UTC+02:00)	Holeš 6'; Deli (penalty missed) 15'; Kaša 22' (o.g.); Van Buren 47'; Bah 72'; Stanciu 84'	Report	Staněk (yellow card) 14'; Beauguel (yellow card) 50'; Mihálik (yellow card) 58'; Káčer 67'	Stadium: Sinobo Stadium; Attendance: 1,486; Referee: Ondřej Berka

9 May 2021 31	Sigma Olomouc	0–1	Slavia Prague	Olomouc
17:00 CEST (UTC+02:00)	Hubník (yellow card) 24'; Poulolo (yellow card) 28'; Daněk (yellow card) 71'; González (yellow card) 84'; Látal (yellow card) 87'	Report	Zima (yellow card) 63'; Kuchta 78'; Dorley (yellow card) 87'	Stadium: Andrův stadion Attendance: 967; Referee: Emanuel Marek

16 May 2021 32	Slavia Prague	1–1	Karviná	Prague
19:30 CEST (UTC+02:00)	Kuchta (penalty missed) 5'; Kacharaba (yellow card) 30'; Holeš 40'; Deli (yellow card) 86'	Report	Neuman (yellow card) 5'; Bartošák (yellow card) 18'; Sinyavskiy (yellow card) 50'; Santos (yellow card) 81'; Čmelík 85'; Šindelář (yellow card) 90+3'	Stadium: Sinobo Stadium; Attendance: 1,415; Referee: Jan Petřík

23 May 2021 33	Jablonec	1–1	Slavia Prague	Jablonec nad Nisou
17:00 CEST (UTC+02:00)	Štěpánek (yellow card) 7'; Doležal 15'; Považanec (yellow card) 29'; Krob (yellow card) 90'; Jovović (yellow card) 90+2'	Report	Lingr 6'; Dorley (yellow card) 52'; Kacharaba (yellow card) 78'	Stadium: Stadion Střelnice; Attendance: 747; Referee: Ondřej Pechanec

29 May 2021 34	Slavia Prague	2–1	Dynamo České Budějovice	Prague
17:00 CEST (UTC+02:00)	Lingr 15'; Kuchta 43'	Report	Skovajsa (yellow card) 12', (goal) 76'; Havelka (yellow card) 50'; Valenta (yellow card) 90'	Stadium: Sinobo Stadium; Attendance: 3,200; Referee: Tomas Klima

=== Czech Cup ===
19 January 2021 Third round	Slavia Prague	4–1	Dukla Prague	Prague
15:30 CET (UTC+01:00)	Hovorka 17'; Lingr 34'; Hromada 42'; Olayinka 90+3'	Report	Fišl (yellow card) 45'; Doumbia (yellow card) 47'; Fábry 53'	Stadium: Sinobo Stadium; Referee: Petr Hocek

3 March 2021 Fourth round	Slavia Prague	10–3	Slavia Karlovy Vary	Prague
19:00 CET (UTC+01:00)	Traoré 3' (pen.); Višinský 24', 58'; Lingr 26', 49'; Tecl 34', 38', 45+1', 86'; Dorley (yellow card) 64'; M.Brabec 65' (o.g.)	Report	Z.Skala 42'; L.Tůma 53'; R.Vokáč (yellow card) 57'; P.Manak (yellow card) 76'; J.Hudec (yellow card) 82'; T.Fencl 84'	Stadium: Sinobo Stadium; Referee: Jan Petik

28 April 2021 Quarter-finals	Sigma Olomouc	0–3	Slavia Prague	Olomouc
14:00 CEST (UTC+02:00)	Poulolo (yellow card) 13'; Zmrzlý (yellow card) 86'	Report	Kuchta 45'; Stanciu 56'; Ševčík 59'	Stadium: Andrův stadion Referee: Emanuel Marek
Note: Match originally scheduled for 7 April, but postponed due to Slavia Prague's involvement in the 2020–21 UEFA Europa League Quarter-finals.

5 May 2021 Semi-finals	Sparta Prague	0–3	Slavia Prague	Prague
17:30 CEST (UTC+02:00)	Vitík (yellow card) 35'; Pavelka (yellow card) 72'; Trávník (yellow card) 77'	Report	Kuchta 25', 53'; Holeš 30', (yellow card) 39'	Stadium: Stadion Letná; Referee: Zbynek Proske

20 May 2021 Final	Viktoria Plzeň	0–1	Slavia Prague	Plzeň
17:00 CEST (UTC+02:00)	Havel (yellow card) 36' (yellow-red card) 54'; Ondrášek (yellow card) 89'; Hejda (yellow card) 90+2'	Report	Masopust (yellow card) 39'; Sima 73'; Kolář (yellow card) 90+1'	Stadium: Doosan Arena; Referee: Roman Hrubes

=== UEFA Champions League ===
==== Qualifying rounds ====
===== Play-off round =====
22 September 2020 First leg	Slavia Prague (Czech Republic)	0–0	(Denmark) Midtjylland	Prague, Czech Republic
21:00 CEST (UTC+02:00)	Holeš (yellow card) 51'; Masopust (yellow card) 70'	Report	Paulinho (yellow card) 87'	Stadium: Sinobo Stadium; Attendance: 0 Referee: Cüneyt Çakır (Turkey)
Note: Match played behind closed doors due to the COVID-19 pandemic in Czech Republic.

30 September 2020 Second leg	Midtjylland (Denmark)	4–1 (4–1 agg.)	(Czech Republic) Slavia Prague	Herning, Denmark
21:00 CEST (UTC+02:00)	Sviatchenko (yellow card) 56'; Kaba 65'; Scholz 84' (pen.); Onyeka 88'; Dreyer 90+1', (yellow card) 90+1'	Report	Olayinka 3'; Hovorka (yellow card) 53'; Bořil (yellow card) 81'	Stadium: MCH Arena; Attendance: 0 Referee: Damir Skomina (Slovenia)
Note: Match played behind closed doors due to the COVID-19 pandemic in Denmark.

=== UEFA Europa League ===
==== Group stage ====
Pos	Team	Pld	W	D	L	GF	GA	GD	Pts	Qualification
1	(Germany) Bayer Leverkusen	6	5	0	1	21	8	+13	15	Advance to knockout phase
2	(Czech Republic) Slavia Prague	6	4	0	2	11	10	+1	12	Advance to knockout phase
3	(Israel) Hapoel Be'er Sheva	6	2	0	4	7	13	−6	6	
4	(France) Nice	6	1	0	5	8	16	−8	3	

Source: UEFA
Rules for classification: Group stage tiebreakers

22 October 2020 1	Hapoel Be'er Sheva (Israel)	3–1	(Czech Republic) Slavia Prague	Petah Tikva, Israel
18:55 CEST (UTC+2)	Bareiro (yellow card) 25'; Agudelo 45'; Josué (yellow card) 45+3'; Vítor (yellow card) 48'; Acolatse 86', 88'; Varenne (yellow card) 90+2'	Report	Provod 75'; Stanciu (yellow card) 85'	Stadium: HaMoshava Stadium; Attendance: 40; Referee: Lawrence Visser (Belgium)
Note: Match played at the HaMoshava Stadium in Petah Tikva, instead of Hapoel's regular Turner Stadium in Be'er Sheva, which was temporarily closed for structural problems with the roof.

29 October 2020 2	Slavia Prague (Czech Republic)	1–0	(Germany) Bayer Leverkusen	Prague, Czech Republic
21:00 CET (UTC+1)	Provod (yellow card) 59'; Stanciu (penalty missed) 65'; Olayinka (yellow card) 68', (goal) 80'; Musa (yellow card) 71'; Ševčík (yellow card) 76'; Kolář (yellow card) 90'	Report	Bellarabi (red card) 22'	Stadium: Sinobo Stadium; Attendance: 0 Referee: Willie Collum (Scotland)
Note: Match played behind closed doors due to the COVID-19 pandemic in Czech Republic.

5 November 2020 3	Slavia Prague (Czech Republic)	3–2	(France) Nice	Prague, Czech Republic
18:55 CET (UTC+1)	Holeš (yellow card) 14'; Kuchta 16', 71' (yellow card) 57'; Sima (yellow card) 22' (goal) 43'; Hovorka (yellow card) 61'	Report	Schneiderlin (yellow card) 25'; Gouiri 33'; Lees-Melou (yellow card) 55'; Daniliuc (yellow card) 61'; Reine-Adélaïde (yellow card) 83'; Ndoye 90+3'	Stadium: Sinobo Stadium; Attendance: 0 Referee: Jakob Kehlet (Denmark)
Note: Match played behind closed doors due to the COVID-19 pandemic in Czech Republic.

26 November 2020 4	Nice (France)	1–3	(Czech Republic) Slavia Prague	Nice, France
21:00 CET (UTC+1)	Nsoki (yellow card) 43'; Atal (yellow card) 53'; Gouiri 61'; Schneiderlin (yellow card) 74'; Bambu (yellow card) 77'; Boudaoui (yellow card) 90+1' (yellow-red card) 90+2'	Report	Lingr 15'; Zima (yellow card) 41'; Bořil (yellow card) 55'; Olayinka 64'; Sima 75'; Kúdela (yellow card) 90+2'	Stadium: Allianz Riviera; Attendance: 0 Referee: Glenn Nyberg (Sweden)
Note: Match played behind closed doors due to the COVID-19 pandemic in France.

3 December 2020 5	Slavia Prague (Czech Republic)	3–0	(Israel) Hapoel Be'er Sheva	Prague, Czech Republic
21:00 CET (UTC+1)	Masopust (yellow card) 15'; Sima 31'; Stanciu 36'; Twito 85' (o.g.)	Report	Bareiro (yellow card) 21'; Keltjens (yellow card) 51'; Yosefi (yellow card) 69'	Stadium: Sinobo Stadium; Attendance: 600; Referee: Tamás Bognár (Hungary)

10 December 2020 6	Bayer Leverkusen (Germany)	4–0	(Czech Republic) Slavia Prague	Leverkusen, Germany
18:55 CET (UTC+1)	Bailey 8', 32'; Schick (yellow card) 39'; Diaby 59'; Onur (yellow card) 85'; Bellarabi 90+1'	Report		Stadium: BayArena; Attendance: 0 Referee: Anastasios Sidiropoulos (Greece)
Note: Match played behind closed doors due to the COVID-19 pandemic in Germany.

==== Knockout phase ====
===== Round of 32 =====
18 February 2021 First leg	Slavia Prague (Czech Republic)	0–0	(England) Leicester City	Prague, Czech Republic
18:55 CET (UTC+1)	Bořil (yellow card) 27'	Report	Ndidi (yellow card) 46'; Iheanacho (yellow card) 65'; Tielemans (yellow card) 81'	Stadium: Sinobo Stadium; Attendance: 600; Referee: Marco Guida (Italy)

25 February 2021 Second leg	Leicester City (England)	0–2 (0–2 agg.)	(Czech Republic) Slavia Prague	Leicester, England
21:00 CET (UTC+1)	Söyüncü (yellow card) 84'; Barnes (yellow card) 88'	Report	Provod 49', (yellow card) 82'; Zima (yellow card) 73'; Sima 79'; Kolář (yellow card) 90+1'	Stadium: King Power Stadium; Attendance: 0 Referee: Serdar Gözübüyük (Netherlands)
Note: Match played behind closed doors due to the COVID-19 pandemic in England.

===== Round of 16 =====
11 March 2021 First leg	Slavia Prague (Czech Republic)	1–1	(Scotland) Rangers	Prague, Czech Republic
18:55 CET (UTC+1)	Stanciu 7'; Zima (yellow card) 56'	Report	Barišić (yellow card) 29'; Helander 36'; Davis (yellow card) 54'	Stadium: Sinobo Stadium; Attendance: 300; Referee: Ovidiu Hațegan (Romania)

18 March 2021 Second leg	Rangers (Scotland)	0–2 (1–3 agg.)	(Czech Republic) Slavia Prague	Glasgow, Scotland
21:00 CET (UTC+1)	Balogun (yellow card) 18' (yellow-red card) 73'; Kamara (yellow card) 39'; Roofe (red card) 62'; Aribo (yellow card) 87'; Goldson (yellow card) 89'	Report	Olayinka 14'; Dorley (yellow card) 35'; Deli (yellow card) 56'; Stanciu 74'; Kúdela (yellow card) 89'	Stadium: Ibrox Stadium; Attendance: 0 Referee: Orel Grinfeld (Israel)
Note: Match played behind closed doors due to the COVID-19 pandemic in Scotland.

===== Quarter-finals =====
8 April 2021 First leg	Arsenal (England)	1–1	(Czech Republic) Slavia Prague	London, England
21:00 CEST (UTC+2)	Pépé 86'	Report	Zima (yellow card) 48'; Holeš 90+4'	Stadium: Emirates Stadium; Attendance: 0 Referee: Andreas Ekberg (Sweden)
Note: Match played behind closed doors due to the COVID-19 pandemic in England.

15 April 2021 Second leg	Slavia Prague (Czech Republic)	0–4 (1–5 agg.)	(England) Arsenal	Prague, Czech Republic
21:00 CEST (UTC+2)	Hromada (yellow card) 20'; Olayinka (yellow card) 63'	Report	Pépé 18'; Lacazette 21' (pen.), 77'; Saka 24'; Martinelli (yellow card) 82'	Stadium: Sinobo Stadium; Attendance: 750; Referee: Cüneyt Çakır (Turkey)

== Squad statistics ==
As of match played 29 May 2021

=== Appearances and goals ===
No.	Pos	Nat	Player	Total		HET liga		MOL Cup		Champions League		Europa League	
No.	Pos	Nat	Player	Apps	Goals	Apps	Goals	Apps	Goals	Apps	Goals	Apps	Goals
1	GK	(Czech Republic) CZE	Ondřej Kolář	48	1	31	1	3	0	2	0	12	0
2	DF	(Czech Republic) CZE	David Hovorka	13	1	7+1	0	1	1	2	0	2	0
3	DF	(Czech Republic) CZE	Tomáš Holeš	38	8	17+7	6	3	1	2	0	8+1	1
4	DF	(Ivory Coast) CIV	Simon Deli	16	0	9+3	0	2+1	0	0	0	1	0
5	DF	(Denmark) DEN	Alexander Bah	26	1	14+3	1	2+1	0	0	0	6	0
6	DF	(Czech Republic) CZE	David Zima	35	0	19+2	0	1+2	0	1	0	10	0
7	MF	(Romania) ROU	Nicolae Stanciu	44	16	26+3	12	3	1	2	0	7+3	3
9	MF	(Nigeria) NGR	Peter Olayinka	39	11	17+7	6	0+2	1	2	1	10+1	3
11	FW	(Czech Republic) CZE	Stanislav Tecl	31	8	7+15	4	2+1	4	1	0	1+4	0
12	FW	(Senegal) SEN	Abdallah Sima	33	16	17+4	11	0+1	1	0	0	9+2	4
13	GK	(Czech Republic) CZE	Jan Stejskal	3	0	1	0	2	0	0	0	0	0
14	FW	(Netherlands) NED	Mick van Buren	16	1	7+5	1	2+2	0	0	0	0	0
15	DF	(Czech Republic) CZE	Ondřej Kúdela	42	6	26+3	6	4	0	1	0	8	0
16	FW	(Czech Republic) CZE	Jan Kuchta	40	20	21+5	15	3	3	0+1	0	7+3	2
17	MF	(Czech Republic) CZE	Lukáš Provod	41	5	23+5	3	0+1	0	1+1	0	8+2	2
18	DF	(Czech Republic) CZE	Jan Bořil	43	4	25+2	4	3	0	2	0	10+1	0
19	MF	(Liberia) LBR	Oscar Dorley	41	2	19+7	2	5	0	0	0	7+3	0
20	MF	(Czech Republic) CZE	Michal Beran	8	0	3+3	0	2	0	0	0	0	0
23	MF	(Czech Republic) CZE	Petr Ševčík	29	1	10+5	0	3+1	1	2	0	7+1	0
24	DF	(Czech Republic) CZE	Laco Takács	7	1	2+4	1	0	0	0+1	0	0	0
25	MF	(Slovakia) SVK	Jakub Hromada	22	1	7+7	0	2+1	1	0	0	4+1	0
26	MF	(Czech Republic) CZE	Tomáš Malinský	7	0	1+3	0	0	0	0	0	2+1	0
27	MF	(Ivory Coast) CIV	Ibrahim Traoré	39	1	9+16	0	1+4	1	0+1	0	2+6	0
28	MF	(Czech Republic) CZE	Lukáš Masopust	45	2	20+6	2	5	0	2	0	5+7	0
29	FW	(Bahrain) BHR	Abdulla Yusuf Helal	9	1	1+7	1	0+1	0	0	0	0	0
30	DF	(Ukraine) UKR	Taras Kacharaba	12	0	7+3	0	2	0	0	0	0	0
31	GK	(Czech Republic) CZE	Přemysl Kovář	1	0	0+1	0	0	0	0	0	0	0
32	FW	(Czech Republic) CZE	Ondřej Lingr	44	8	11+16	4	2+3	3	0	0	4+8	1
34	GK	(Czech Republic) CZE	Matyáš Vágner	3	0	2	0	0	0	0	0	0+1	0
37	MF	(Czech Republic) CZE	Matouš Nikl	1	0	0	0	0+1	0	0	0	0	0
39	DF	(Czech Republic) CZE	Daniel Samek	3	0	2	0	0+1	0	0	0	0	0
40	MF	(Czech Republic) CZE	Tomáš Rigo	3	0	0+1	0	1	0	0	0	0+1	0
41	FW	(Czech Republic) CZE	Denis Višinský	4	2	0+2	0	1	2	0	0	0+1	0
Players away from Slavia Prague on loan:
4	DF	(Czech Republic) CZE	Ondřej Karafiát	7	0	2+3	0	0	0	0	0	0+2	0
33	FW	(Croatia) CRO	Petar Musa	21	4	4+10	4	0+1	0	0+2	0	2+2	0
37	FW	(Czech Republic) CZE	Matěj Jurásek	3	0	1+1	0	0	0	0	0	0+1	0
39	MF	(Czech Republic) CZE	Jakub Křišťan	1	0	0	0	0	0	0	0	0+1	0
Players who left Slavia Prague during the season:
5	DF	(Czech Republic) CZE	Vladimír Coufal	7	0	4+1	0	0	0	2	0	0	0

=== Goal scorers ===
Place	Position	Nation	Number	Name	HET liga	MOL Cup	Champions League	Europa League	Total
1	FW	(Czech Republic)	16	Jan Kuchta	15	3	0	2	20
2	MF	(Romania)	7	Nicolae Stanciu	12	1	0	3	16
2	FW	(Senegal)	12	Abdallah Sima	11	1	0	4	16
4	MF	(Nigeria)	9	Peter Olayinka	6	1	1	3	11
5	DF	(Czech Republic)	3	Tomáš Holeš	6	1	0	1	8
5	FW	(Czech Republic)	11	Stanislav Tecl	4	4	0	0	8
5	FW	(Czech Republic)	32	Ondřej Lingr	4	3	0	1	8
8	DF	(Czech Republic)	15	Ondřej Kúdela	6	0	0	0	6
9	MF	(Czech Republic)	17	Lukáš Provod	3	0	0	2	5
10	FW	(Croatia)	33	Petar Musa	4	0	0	0	4
10	DF	(Czech Republic)	18	Jan Bořil	4	0	0	0	4
12				Own goal	1	1	0	1	3
13	MF	(Czech Republic)	28	Lukáš Masopust	2	0	0	0	2
13	MF	(Liberia)	19	Oscar Dorley	2	0	0	0	2
13	FW	(Czech Republic)	41	Denis Višinský	0	2	0	0	2
16	GK	(Czech Republic)	1	Ondřej Kolář	1	0	0	0	1
16	DF	(Czech Republic)	24	Laco Takács	1	0	0	0	1
16	FW	(Bahrain)	29	Abdulla Yusuf Helal	1	0	0	0	1
16	FW	(Netherlands)	14	Mick van Buren	1	0	0	0	1
16	DF	(Denmark)	5	Alexander Bah	1	0	0	0	1
16	DF	(Czech Republic)	2	David Hovorka	0	1	0	0	1
16	MF	(Slovakia)	25	Jakub Hromada	0	1	0	0	1
16	MF	(Ivory Coast)	27	Ibrahim Traoré	0	1	0	0	1
16	MF	(Czech Republic)	23	Petr Ševčík	0	1	0	0	1
				TOTALS	85	21	1	17	124

=== Clean sheets ===
Place	Position	Nation	Number	Name	HET liga	MOL Cup	Champions League	Europa League	Total
1	GK	(Czech Republic)	1	Ondřej Kolář	16	3	1	5	25
2	GK	(Czech Republic)	34	Matyáš Vágner	2	0	0	1	3
3	GK	(Czech Republic)	31	Přemysl Kovář	1	0	0	0	1
				TOTALS	18	3	1	5	27

Kolář & Vágner both played in Slavia's 2-0 win against Rangers on 18 March 2021 Vágner & Kovář both played in Slavia's 0-0 draw against Zbrojovka Brno on 4 April 2021

=== Disciplinary record ===
Number	Nation	Position	Name	HET liga		MOL Cup		Champions League		Europa League		Total	
Number	Nation	Position	Name	Yellow card	Red card	Yellow card	Red card	Yellow card	Red card	Yellow card	Red card	Yellow card	Red card
1	(Czech Republic)	GK	Ondřej Kolář	0	0	1	0	0	0	2	0	3	0
2	(Czech Republic)	DF	David Hovorka	1	0	0	0	1	0	1	0	3	0
3	(Czech Republic)	DF	Tomáš Holeš	2	0	1	0	1	0	1	0	5	0
4	(Ivory Coast)	DF	Simon Deli	1	0	0	0	0	0	1	0	2	0
5	(Denmark)	DF	Alexander Bah	3	0	0	0	0	0	0	0	3	0
6	(Czech Republic)	DF	David Zima	2	0	0	0	0	0	4	0	6	0
7	(Romania)	MF	Nicolae Stanciu	2	0	0	0	0	0	1	0	3	0
9	(Nigeria)	MF	Peter Olayinka	3	0	0	0	0	0	2	0	5	0
11	(Czech Republic)	FW	Stanislav Tecl	2	0	0	0	0	0	0	0	2	0
12	(Senegal)	FW	Abdallah Sima	5	1	0	0	0	0	1	0	6	1
14	(Netherlands)	FW	Mick van Buren	1	0	0	0	0	0	0	0	1	0
15	(Czech Republic)	DF	Ondřej Kúdela	4	0	0	0	0	0	2	0	6	0
16	(Czech Republic)	FW	Jan Kuchta	5	0	0	0	0	0	1	0	6	0
17	(Czech Republic)	MF	Lukáš Provod	2	0	0	0	0	0	2	0	4	0
18	(Czech Republic)	DF	Jan Bořil	3	0	0	0	1	0	2	0	6	0
19	(Liberia)	MF	Oscar Dorley	6	0	1	0	0	0	1	0	8	0
23	(Czech Republic)	MF	Petr Ševčík	0	0	0	0	0	0	1	0	1	0
25	(Slovakia)	MF	Jakub Hromada	2	0	0	0	0	0	1	0	3	0
27	(Ivory Coast)	MF	Ibrahim Traoré	3	0	0	0	0	0	0	0	3	0
28	(Czech Republic)	MF	Lukáš Masopust	4	0	1	0	1	0	1	0	7	0
29	(Bahrain)	FW	Abdulla Yusuf Helal	3	0	0	0	0	0	0	0	3	0
30	(Ukraine)	DF	Taras Kacharaba	3	0	0	0	0	0	0	0	3	0
32	(Czech Republic)	FW	Ondřej Lingr	3	0	0	0	0	0	0	0	3	0
34	(Czech Republic)	GK	Matyáš Vágner	1	1	0	0	0	0	0	0	1	1
Players who left Slavia Prague during the season:
5	(Czech Republic)	DF	Vladimír Coufal	1	0	0	0	0	0	0	0	1	0
33	(Croatia)	FW	Petar Musa	2	0	0	0	0	0	1	0	3	0
			TOTALS	64	2	4	0	4	0	25	0	97	2
