= David Zima =

Czech footballer (born 2000)

- Zima in 2026

Personal information
- Date of birth: 8 November 2000 (age 26)
- Place of birth: Olomouc, Czech Republic
- Height: 1.90 m (6 ft 3 in)
- Position: Defender

Team information
- Current team: Slavia Prague
- Number: 4

Youth career
- Sigma Olomouc

Senior career*
Years	Team	Apps	(Gls)
2019–2020	Sigma Olomouc	2	(0)
2020	→ Slavia Prague (loan)	12	(1)
2020–2021	Slavia Prague	25	(0)
2021–2024	Torino	34	(0)
2024–	Slavia Prague	70	(4)

International career^{‡}
2017–2018	Czech Republic U18	9	(1)
2019	Czech Republic U20	4	(0)
2020–	Czech Republic U21	4	(0)
2021–	Czech Republic	28	(1)
- * Club domestic league appearances and goals as of 31 October 2026 ‡ National team caps and goals as of 15 November 2026

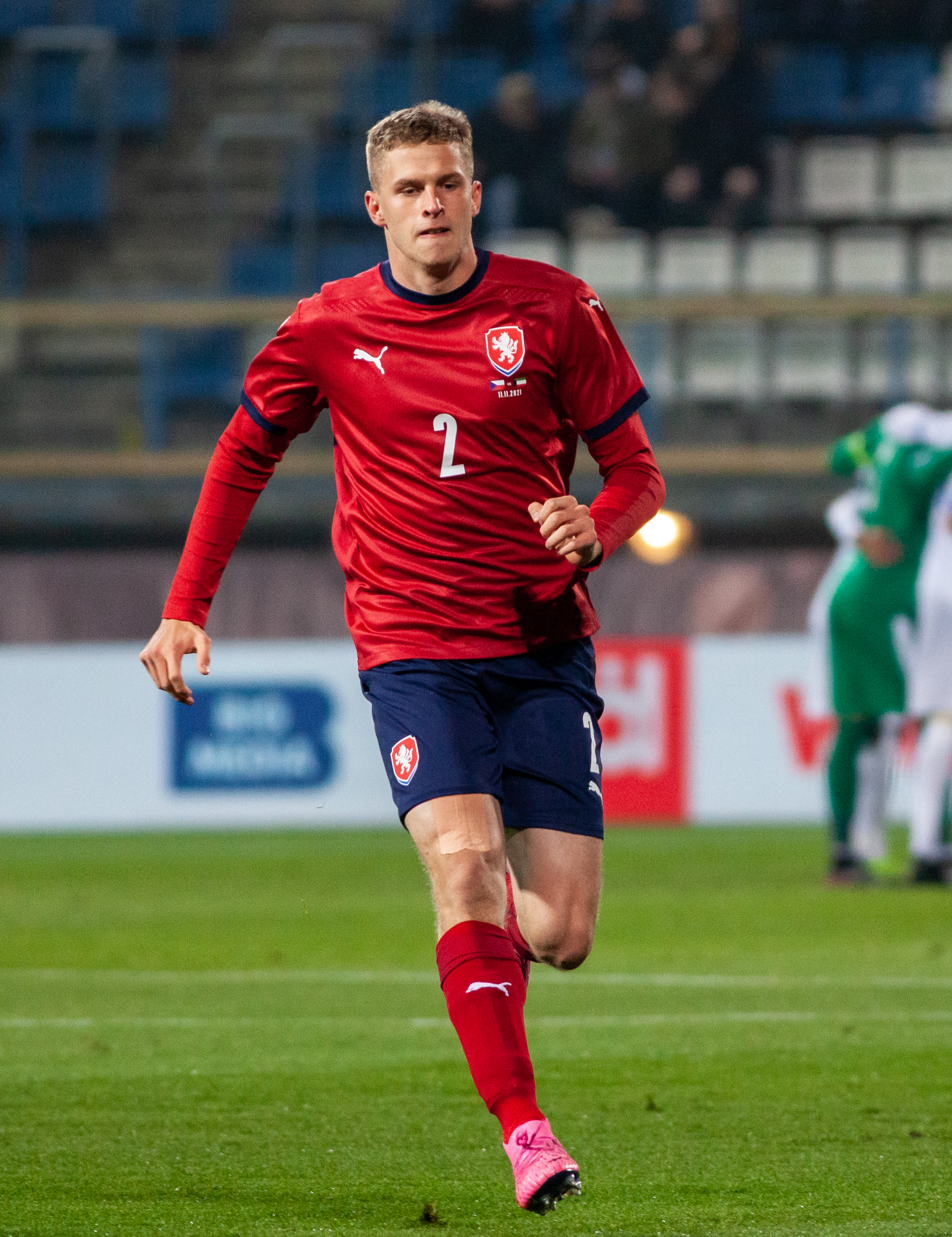
Zima in 2021

David Zima (born 8 November 2000) is a Czech professional footballer who plays as a defender for Slavia Prague and the Czech Republic national team.

== Club career ==
On 1 February 2020, Zima joined Slavia Prague on loan from Sigma Olomouc for the remainder of the season, with an option to make the move permanent, after just two league appearances for Sigma Olomouc.

=== Torino ===
On 31 August 2021, Zima signed for Serie A club Torino for a reported fee of €5 million. During his first season, Zima played 20 league games and helped the club finishing tenth place.

During the 2022–23 Serie A, Zima suffered from a meniscus injury at the end of January 2023, resulting in him to miss the rest of the season. In total, he played in 11 games in the season, scoring one goal.

During the 2023–24 Serie A campaign, Zima made his first competitive appearance for Torino on 21 August 2023, a goalless league draw with Cagliari. Having played less minutes for the club, he was linked with a Bundesliga move during the 2023–24 winter transfer window.

=== Return to Slavia Prague ===
On 31 January 2024, Zima returned to Slavia Prague signed a contract until June 2028. With a value of €4m, he became the most expensive transfer in the Czech First League history.

== International career ==
Zima made his debut for the Czech Republic national team on 24 March 2021 in a World Cup qualifier against Estonia.

On 31 May 2026, Zima was selected in the 26-man squad for the 2026 FIFA World Cup.

== Career statistics ==
=== Club ===
As of match played 31 October 2026

Appearances and goals by club, season and competition
Club	Season	League			National cup (Note: Includes Czech Cup, Coppa Italia)		Continental		Other		Total	
Club	Season	Division	Apps	Goals	Apps	Goals	Apps	Goals	Apps	Goals	Apps	Goals
Sigma Olomouc	2019–20	Czech First League	2	0	1	0	—		—		3	0
Slavia Prague (loan)	2019–20	Czech First League	12	1	—		—		—		12	1
Slavia Prague	2020–21	Czech First League	21	0	3	0	11 (Note: One appearance in UEFA Champions League, ten appearances in UEFA Europa League)	0	—		35	0
Slavia Prague	2021–22	Czech First League	4	0	0	0	3 (Note: One appearance in UEFA Champions League, two appearances in UEFA Europa League)	0	—		7	0
Slavia Prague	Total		37	1	3	0	14	0	—		54	1
Torino	2021–22	Serie A	20	0	0	0	—		—		20	0
Torino	2022–23	Serie A	9	0	2	1	—		—		11	1
Torino	2023–24	Serie A	5	0	1	1	—		—		6	1
Torino	Total		34	0	3	2	—		—		37	2
Slavia Prague	2023–24	Czech First League	14	0	1	0	2 (Note: Appearances in UEFA Europa League)	0	—		17	0
Slavia Prague	2024–25	Czech First League	23	2	1	0	10 (Note: Four appearances in UEFA Champions League, six appearances in UEFA Europa League)	0	—		34	2
Slavia Prague	2025–26	Czech First League	24	1	1	0	8 (Note: Appearances in UEFA Champions League)	0	—		33	1
Slavia Prague	2026–27	Czech First League	9	1	1	0	3	0	—		13	1
Slavia Prague	Total		70	4	4	0	23	0	—		97	4
Career total			143	5	11	2	37	0	0	0	191	7

=== International ===
As of match played 15 November 2026

Appearances and goals by national team and year
National team	Year	Apps	Goals
Czech Republic	2021	5	0
Czech Republic	2022	10	0
Czech Republic	2023	4	0
Czech Republic	2024	3	1
Czech Republic	2025	2	0
Czech Republic	2026	4	0
Total		28	1

Scores and results list the Czech Republic's goal tally first, score column indicates score after each Zima goal.

List of international goals scored by David Zima
No.	Date	Venue	Opponent	Score	Result	Competition
1	22 March 2024	Ullevaal Stadion, Oslo, Norway	Norway	1–0	2–1	Friendly

== Honours ==
Slavia Prague

- Czech First League: 2019–20, 2020–21, 2024–25, 2025–26
- Czech Cup: 2020–21,
