= Matyáš Vágner =

Czech footballer

Personal information
- Date of birth: 5 February 2003 (age 23)
- Place of birth: Prague, Czech Republic
- Height: 1.91 m (6 ft 3 in)
- Position: Goalkeeper

Team information
- Current team: Hradec Králové
- Number: 20

Youth career
- 2009–2016: Tempo Prague
- 2016–2020: Slavia Prague

Senior career*
Years	Team	Apps	(Gls)
2020–2024	Slavia Prague	2	(0)
2021–2024	→ Vlašim (loan)	74	(0)
2024–	Hradec Králové	0	(0)
2024–	Hradec Králové B	22	(0)

International career^{‡}
2018–2019	Czech Republic U16	6	(0)
2019–2020	Czech Republic U17	7	(0)
2021–	Czech Republic U19	1	(0)
2022–	Czech Republic U20	1	(0)
- * Club domestic league appearances and goals as of 27 May 2026 ‡ National team caps and goals as of 16:54, 26 September 2022 (UTC)

Matyáš Vágner (born 5 February 2003) is a Czech professional footballer who plays as a goalkeeper for Hradec Králové.

== Career ==
Vágner made his professional debut in a 2–0 UEFA Europa League win against Rangers on 18 March 2021. He came on as a substitute in the 60th minute, as the starting goalkeeper Ondřej Kolář left the game following a life-threatening foul of Kemar Roofe resulting in a fractured skull and 10 stitches.

== Honours ==
SK Slavia Prague

- Czech First League: 2020–21
- Czech Cup: 2020–21
