= 2020–21 Czech First League =

28th season of top-tier football league in Czech Republic

Czech First League
- Season: 2020–21
- Dates: 21 August 2020 – 29 May 2021
- Champions: Slavia Prague
- Relegated: Zbrojovka Brno; Příbram; Opava
- Champions League: Slavia Prague; Sparta Prague
- Europa League: Jablonec
- Europa Conference League: Viktoria; Slovácko
- Matches: 306
- Goals: 822 (2.69 per match)
- Top goalscorer: Jan Kuchta; Adam Hložek (15 goals)
- Biggest home win: Viktoria 7–0 Teplice (15 December 2020)
- Biggest away win: České Budějovice 0–6 Slavia (23 August 2020)
- Highest scoring: Sparta 7–2 Teplice (3 April 2021); Mladá Boleslav 4–5 Sparta (16 May 2021)
- Longest winning run: 8 matches Slavia
- Longest unbeaten run: 34 matches Slavia
- Longest winless run: 15 matches Příbram
- Longest losing run: 6 matches Opava & Zlín
- All statistics correct as of May 30, 2021.

The 2020–21 Czech First League, known as the Fortuna liga for sponsorship reasons, was the 28th season of the Czech Republic's top-tier football for professional clubs since its establishment in 1993. Slavia Prague have won their twenty-first league title which was their fourth in the last five years. The season was initially scheduled to start on 11 July but was delayed until 21 August as a consequence of the postponement of the previous season's conclusion due to the outbreak of COVID-19. The first half of the season only had 15 rounds and finished on 19 December, while the spring half commenced on 29 January 2021, the earliest such date in league history.

This season was set to be played with 18 clubs, each team played in the league format with home and away matches, and the bottom three teams were relegated directly to the second league at the end of the season. It was the third season to use VAR, featuring it in six to eight matches per match-week in the first half of the season. From January 2021, all nine matches had VAR. As was the case at the end of the previous season, there will be limited attendance from the fans in the stadiums due to measures related to COVID-19 pandemic.

== Summary ==
This season was the third to have betting agency Fortuna as the title sponsor. In February 2020 the sponsorship contract was extended by another two years to expire in 2023–24. It was also the third season with TV broadcasting rights held by O2 TV, showing all nine matches per match-week. Further, the national broadcaster ČT Sport broadcast one match per round (fourth option) and the newspaper iSport.cz holds rights for the highlights from all matches.

With Slavia, Viktoria, and Sparta finishing top-three in the 2019–20 season, many expected a close race for the title amongst this trio. Sparta and Slavia started the season in strong form with unbeaten runs in their first six matches, while Viktoria lost in the second round in Liberec. The season was postponed in October due to COVID-19 measures with Sparta at the top, followed by Slavia and Viktoria. The race for the title resumed behind closed doors in November with Viktoria's 3–1 win over Sparta in the seventh round and opened up a lead for the rivals Slavia. Sparta and Viktoria suffered another loss in the following round and the gap increased. Slavia maintained their lead for the remainder of the season.

The last match of the autumn program was played on 23 December, the latest such date in Czech league history. Before the four-week winter break, Slavia held a 7-point lead ahead of Sparta and Jablonec. At the other end of the table Brno, Příbram, and Opava were positioned in the relegation zone. Due to several teams having troubles with the COVID-19 during and after the break, the schedule was condensed and an updated league calendar was issued. Mid-week slots were added and the league continued to be played in such format until the end of the season.

After February's match-week 17 Sparta's 0–1 loss against Bohemians, their coach Václav Kotal was sacked and replaced with three-time league champion and former national team coach, Pavel Vrba, who won his first game in charge against Olomouc, 2–3 away.

During the season, Slavia broke several Czech League all-time records. They achieved a record 41 consecutive matches unbeaten with a draw at Bohemians on 24 April 2021 and increased it to 46 on the last matchday (the run still continues) to finish the whole season with an unbeaten record. Slavia recorded 24 wins, 86 points, and 85 goals scored in a single season, which are season records for the Czech first league.

On 2 May 2021, Sparta drew 2–2 in Liberec, mathematically confirming Slavia as champions for the third successive season. Slavia defeated Viktoria 5–1 in Sinobo Stadium later that evening. Viktoria, positioned 5th, drew the next fixture with Příbram 3–3, and following the match, coach Guľa was sacked.

On 8 May 2021, Opava was confirmed to be the first team to be relegated to the FNL after a 1–1 draw at Zlín, with three games remaining ending their three-year tenure in the first league. A week later on 16 May 2021, 15th-placed Teplice defeated České Budějovice and relegated Brno, immediately returning to the FNL after a season's presence in the top flight. On 23 May 2021, Příbram was the third and final team to be relegated following a 0–1 defeat at home against Pardubice with one game remaining, also ending their First League tenure after three-years.

== Teams ==
Locations of the 2020–21 Czech First League teams

=== Teams relegated from Czech First League ===
In the last season's format of the league, all teams played a round-robin home and away format of the league. After 30 matches the teams were divided into championship (top 6), play-off (7th–10th), and relegation (bottom 6) groups. Points and goals in the relegation group were fully carried over from the regular season. The last team should have been relegated and the two teams positioned 14th and 15th should have played a playoff format with second league teams positioned second and third. The relegation group was scheduled to conclude on 7 July 2020 but as a result of three Karviná players tested positive for COVID-19, the final two rounds of matches were postponed to 23 and 26 July. On 23 July, the date of the first postponed round, one player from Opava tested positive and the team was placed into two weeks long isolation which led to the abandonment of the last two rounds.

On 24 July the league FA announced that due to time pressure, the relegation group would remain unfinished and as a consequence, no team could be relegated. To avoid playing the 2020–21 season with an odd number of teams, automatic promotion was extended to the second-placed team as well as the winners of the Second League. The elimination play-offs were cancelled and the number of participants for the 2020–21 season increased from 16 to 18.

At the end of the regular season, 1. FK Příbram were in last position, with elimination playoff spots held by MFK Karviná and SFC Opava. The same order was recorded after playing three rounds of the relegation group.

=== Teams promoted to Czech First League ===
The second league was also impacted by COVID pandemic but fully finished after a delay. On 11 July 2020 in the penultimate round of the season FK Pardubice beat Vyšehrad 4–1 and secured automatic promotion to the First League for the first time in their history. Pardubice were previously represented three times in the Czechoslovak First League, by another team from the city, most recently in 1968.

Since the decision that all sixteen teams would remain in the top league and to prevent having an odd number of participants, the second place holder Brno was invited to join the top tier after an absence of two years. Third-placed team Dukla Prague remained in the second league without the right to play a playoff match.

=== Locations and stadiums ===
The home stadium of newly promoted FK Pardubice was not certified by the league to host the First League matches. The club opted to play their home league matches at Bohemians' Ďolíček stadium.

Team	Location	Stadium	Capacity	Ref.
Bohemians 1905	Prague	Ďolíček	5,000	
SK Dynamo České Budějovice	České Budějovice	Stadion Střelecký ostrov	6,681	
FK Jablonec	Jablonec nad Nisou	Stadion Střelnice	6,108	
MFK Karviná	Karviná	Městský stadion (Karviná)	4,833	
FC Slovan Liberec	Liberec	Stadion u Nisy	9,900	
FK Mladá Boleslav	Mladá Boleslav	Lokotrans Aréna	5,000	
SK Sigma Olomouc	Olomouc	Andrův stadion	12,483	
SFC Opava	Opava	Městský stadion (Opava)	7,758	
FC Baník Ostrava	Ostrava	Městský stadion (Ostrava)	15,123	
FC Viktoria Plzeň	Plzeň	Doosan Arena	11,700	
1. FK Příbram	Příbram	Na Litavce	9,100	
SK Slavia Prague	Prague	Sinobo Stadium	19,370	
1. FC Slovácko	Uherské Hradiště	Městský fotbalový stadion Miroslava Valenty	8,000	
AC Sparta Prague	Prague	Generali Česká pojišťovna Arena	18,944	
FK Teplice	Teplice	Na Stínadlech	18,221	
FC Fastav Zlín	Zlín	Letná Stadion	5,783	
FK Pardubice	Pardubice	Ďolíček	5,000	
Zbrojovka Brno	Brno	Srbská	10,200	

Region	Number of teams	Club(s)
Prague	3	Bohemians 1905, Sparta Prague, Slavia Prague
Moravian-Silesian	3	Baník Ostrava, Karviná, Opava
Central Bohemia	2	Mladá Boleslav, Příbram
Liberec	2	Jablonec, Slovan Liberec
Zlín	2	Fastav Zlín, Slovácko
Olomouc	1	Sigma Olomouc
Plzeň	1	Viktoria Plzeň
Ústí nad Labem	1	Teplice
South Bohemia	1	České Budějovice
Pardubice	1	Pardubice
South Moravia	1	Brno

=== Personnel and kits ===
Team	Manager	Manager Appointed	Captain	Kit manufacturer	Shirt sponsor
Slavia Prague	(Czech Republic) Jindřich Trpišovský	22 December 2017	(Czech Republic) Jan Bořil	Puma	Citic Group
Viktoria Plzeň	(Czech Republic) Michal Bílek	10 May 2021	(Czech Republic) Jakub Brabec	Macron	Doosan
Sparta Prague	(Czech Republic) Pavel Vrba	3 February 2021	(Czech Republic) Bořek Dočkal	Nike	Tipsport
Jablonec	(Czech Republic) Petr Rada	14 December 2017	(Czech Republic) Tomáš Hübschman	Capelli Sport	Telmo
Baník Ostrava	(Czech Republic) Ondřej Smetana	27 February 2021	(Czech Republic) Jan Laštůvka	Puma	MW Dias
Slovan Liberec	(Czech Republic) Pavel Hoftych	14 June 2019	(Czech Republic) Jaroslav Drobný	Nike	Preciosa
Mladá Boleslav	(Czech Republic) Karel Jarolím	8 December 2020	(Czech Republic) Lukáš Budínský	Adidas	Škoda
Sigma Olomouc	(Czech Republic) Radoslav Látal	31 May 2019	(Czech Republic) Roman Hubník	Adidas	Sigma
Fastav Zlín	(Czech Republic) Jan Jelínek	10 May 2021	(Czech Republic) Petr Jiráček	Adidas	Lukrom
Teplice	(Czech Republic) Radim Kučera	30 November 2020	(Czech Republic) Jakub Mareš	Puma	AGC, Bílinská kyselka
Slovácko	(Czech Republic) Martin Svědík	10 November 2018	(Czech Republic) Stanislav Hofmann	Puma	Z-Group
Opava	(Czech Republic) Radoslav Kováč	11 June 2020	(Czech Republic) Jan Žídek	Nike	Isotra
Bohemians 1905	(Czech Republic) Luděk Klusáček	10 October 2019	(Czech Republic) Josef Jindřišek	Adidas	Balshop.cz
Příbram	(Slovakia) Jozef Valachovič	15 March 2021	(Czech Republic) Jan Rezek	Jako	--none--
Karviná	(Czech Republic) Jozef Weber	23 March 2021	(Czech Republic) Martin Šindelář	Adidas	ROKD
České Budějovice	(Czech Republic) David Horejš	12 October 2015	(Czech Republic) Jiří Kladrubský	Adidas	Autodraft
FK Pardubice	(Czech Republic) Jiří Krejčí	30 May 2013	(Czech Republic) Jan Jeřábek	Lotto	Strabag
Zbrojovka Brno	(Czech Republic) Richard Dostálek	15 December 2020	(Slovakia) Peter Štepanovský	Nike	Wedos

=== Managerial changes ===
Team	Outgoing manager	Manner of departure	Date of vacancy	Match-week	Position in table	Replaced by	Date of appointment	Contract valid until
Teplice	(Czech Republic) Stanislav Hejkal	Sacked	29 November 2020	9	15th	(Czech Republic) Radim Kučera	30 November 2020	Summer 2023
Mladá Boleslav	(Czech Republic) Jozef Weber	Sacked	7 December 2020	10	15th	(Czech Republic) Karel Jarolím	8 December 2020	Summer 2021
Zbrojovka	(Czech Republic) Miloslav Machálek	Sacked	15 December 2020	11	17th	(Czech Republic) Richard Dostálek	15 December 2020	Summer 2021
Sparta	(Czech Republic) Václav Kotal	Sacked	3 February 2021	17	3rd	(Czech Republic) Pavel Vrba	3 February 2021	Summer 2022
Baník	(Czech Republic) Luboš Kozel	Sacked	27 February 2021	21	9th	(Czech Republic) Ondřej Smetana	27 February 2021	unknown
Příbram	(Czech Republic) Pavel Horváth	Sacked	15 March 2021	23	18th	(Slovakia) Jozef Valachovič	15 March 2021	unknown
Karviná	(Slovakia) Juraj Jarábek	Sacked	16 March 2021	23	13th	(Czech Republic) Jozef Weber	23 March 2021	unknown
Plzeň	(Slovakia) Adrián Guľa	Sacked	9 May 2021	31	5th	(Czech Republic) Michal Bílek	10 May 2021	unknown
Zlín	(Czech Republic) Bohumil Páník	Sacked	10 May 2021	31	14th	(Czech Republic) Jan Jelínek	10 May 2021	Summer 2021

== League table ==
Pos	Team	Pld	W	D	L	GF	GA	GD	Pts	Qualification or relegation
1	Slavia Prague (C)	34	26	8	0	85	20	+65	86	Qualification for the Champions League third qualifying round
2	Sparta Prague	34	23	5	6	82	43	+39	74	Qualification for the Champions League second qualifying round
3	Jablonec	34	21	6	7	59	33	+26	69	Qualification for the Europa League third qualifying round
4	Slovácko	34	19	6	9	58	33	+25	63	Qualification for the Europa Conference League second qualifying round
5	Viktoria Plzeň	34	17	7	10	60	45	+15	58	Qualification for the Europa Conference League second qualifying round
6	Slovan Liberec	34	14	10	10	44	32	+12	52	
7	Pardubice	34	15	7	12	41	42	−1	52	
8	Baník Ostrava	34	13	10	11	48	38	+10	49	
9	Sigma Olomouc	34	11	12	11	40	40	0	45	
10	Bohemians 1905	34	10	13	11	40	37	+3	43	
11	Mladá Boleslav	34	10	9	15	49	54	−5	39	
12	Karviná	34	9	12	13	37	49	−12	39	
13	České Budějovice	34	9	11	14	33	47	−14	38	
14	Fastav Zlín	34	8	8	18	30	50	−20	32	
15	Teplice	34	7	9	18	34	66	−32	30	
16	Zbrojovka Brno (R)	34	5	11	18	33	57	−24	26	Relegation to FNL
17	Příbram (R)	34	5	10	19	26	65	−39	25	Relegation to FNL
18	Opava (R)	34	3	8	23	23	71	−48	17	Relegation to FNL

Source: Fortuna Liga
Rules for classification: 1) Points; 2) Head-to-head points; 3) Head-to-head goal difference; 4) Head-to-head goals scored; 5) Goal difference; 6) Goals scored; 7) Fair-play ranking; 8) Draw.
(C) Champions; (R) Relegated

== Table progress ==
	1	2	3	4	5	6	7	8	9	10	11	12	13	14	15	16	17	18	19	20	21	22	23	24	25	26	27	28	29	30	31	32	33	34
Slavia	1	1	2	2	2	2	1	1	1	1	1	1	1	1	1	1	1	1	1	1	1	1	1	1	1	1	1	1	1	1	1	1	1	1
Sparta	3	2	1	1	1	1	2	2	2	2	2	2	2	3	3	3	2	2	2	2	2	2	2	2	2	3	2	3	3	3	2	2	2	2
Jablonec	7	5	4	7	5	6	8	5	8	3	3	3	3	2	2	2	2	3	3	4	4	5	4	3	4	2	3	2	2	2	3	3	3	3
Slovácko	6	4	3	6	8	10	11	10	6	6	8	10	9	6	4	4	4	4	4	3	3	3	5	4	3	4	4	4	4	4	4	4	4	4
Viktoria	4	11	8	3	3	3	3	4	4	5	6	5	5	9	9	8	5	8	8	6	6	6	6	6	6	5	5	5	5	5	5	5	5	5
Liberec	12	7	5	5	6	5	5	6	9	10	11	8	6	8	6	6	8	5	5	5	5	4	3	5	5	6	6	6	6	6	6	6	6	6
Pardubice	12	10	10	12	7	7	6	7	7	8	5	6	8	5	8	10	10	7	9	7	7	7	8	9	7	9	7	7	7	7	7	7	7	7
Baník	9	13	13	9	12	13	10	13	13	12	10	7	10	7	5	5	7	10	6	9	9	9	7	7	8	7	8	8	8	8	8	8	8	8
Bohemians	2	3	9	11	13	9	12	11	11	13	13	13	13	14	14	13	12	12	12	12	13	13	12	11	11	10	10	10	10	9	9	9	9	10
Olomouc	7	12	7	4	4	4	4	3	3	4	4	4	4	4	7	7	6	9	10	8	8	8	9	8	9	8	9	9	9	10	10	10	10	9
Budějovice	18	15	17	16	16	16	17	12	12	11	12	12	12	13	10	9	9	6	7	10	10	10	10	10	10	11	12	12	12	11	11	11	12	13
Karviná	9	5	11	10	10	8	7	9	10	9	7	9	7	10	11	11	11	11	11	11	12	12	13	13	13	12	11	11	11	12	12	12	11	12
Boleslav	17	18	18	14	14	15	15	14	14	15	15	15	15	15	15	15	16	16	16	16	15	15	15	15	15	14	14	14	14	13	13	13	1314	11
Zlín	11	8	6	8	9	11	9	8	5	7	9	11	11	11	12	12	13	13	13	13	11	11	11	12	12	13	13	13	13	14	14	14	14	14
Teplice	4	8	12	13	11	12	13	15	15	14	14	14	14	12	13	14	14	14	14	14	14	14	14	14	14	15	15	15	15	15	15	15	15	15
Příbram	14	17	15	17	17	17	18	18	18	17	16	17	17	17	17	17	17	17	17	17	17	18	18	18	18	18	17	17	17	17	17	16	17	17
Brno	16	14	15	18	18	18	16	16	16	16	17	16	16	16	16	16	15	15	15	15	16	16	16	16	16	16	16	16	16	16	16	17	16	16
Opava	14	16	14	15	15	14	14	17	17	18	18	18	18	18	18	18	18	18	18	18	18	17	17	17	17	17	18	18	18	18	18	18	18	18

== Results ==
Home \ Away	BOH	BRN	CBU	JAB	KAR	LIB	MLA	OLO	OPA	OST	PCE	PLZ	PRI	SLA	SLO	SPA	TEP	ZLN
Bohemians 1905	—	2–1	1–1	0–0	2–0	3–0	4–0	0–0	0–0	1–1	1–1	1–4	2–1	0–0	1–3	1–2	2–0	2–0
FC Zbrojovka Brno	0–0	—	1–3	1–2	0–2	0–3	2–3	2–4	4–1	0–1	1–2	0–1	1–1	0–0	2–1	1–4	0–0	0–0
České Budějovice	2–1	0–2	—	0–2	1–1	0–2	1–3	2–2	0–1	1–0	2–0	0–0	2–1	0–6	0–1	0–0	2–0	1–2
Jablonec	2–1	0–1	2–1	—	3–0	2–1	1–1	3–1	4–1	2–0	1–0	3–2	2–1	1–1	0–3	1–0	4–1	3–1
Karviná	2–1	1–1	3–0	2–2	—	1–1	0–0	0–1	3–1	0–0	0–2	1–1	0–1	1–3	0–2	2–5	2–0	0–2
Slovan Liberec	1–1	1–1	0–0	1–3	1–1	—	3–0	1–2	2–0	0–0	4–1	4–1	3–0	0–1	1–1	2–2	2–1	1–0
Mladá Boleslav	3–1	1–1	2–2	2–0	2–0	0–1	—	1–1	2–0	1–3	4–1	2–2	0–0	0–3	2–3	4–5	0–2	1–3
Sigma Olomouc	3–0	1–0	1–1	1–3	3–0	1–0	0–3	—	4–1	0–2	0–1	2–2	1–1	0–1	0–0	2–3	1–1	0–1
Opava	1–1	0–2	0–0	0–1	1–2	0–2	2–2	1–2	—	1–2	1–0	1–3	0–0	0–6	1–2	0–3	2–1	0–0
Baník Ostrava	1–0	1–1	2–2	2–1	1–1	1–0	2–1	1–1	3–0	—	3–0	0–2	5–0	0–1	1–2	0–0	1–1	4–2
FK Pardubice	0–2	2–1	0–2	0–1	2–2	3–0	2–2	1–1	1–0	3–2	—	3–0	1–0	1–1	3–1	2–2	2–1	0–0
Viktoria Plzeň	3–1	4–1	2–1	1–1	0–1	0–2	2–1	1–0	3–1	4–0	2–0	—	3–3	0–1	2–1	3–1	7–0	2–0
Příbram	1–4	1–1	0–1	1–0	0–1	0–2	2–1	0–2	1–1	0–4	0–1	0–0	—	3–3	1–4	1–3	1–3	1–0
Slavia Prague	2–1	1–1	2–1	3–0	1–1	3–0	1–0	3–1	4–0	2–1	3–0	5–1	3–0	—	3–0	2–0	5–1	2–1
Slovácko	1–1	4–2	0–0	1–1	2–0	1–0	0–1	0–0	3–1	2–1	0–1	4–0	5–1	2–3	—	1–2	2–0	2–0
Sparta Prague	0–1	6–1	2–4	2–1	4–3	1–1	1–0	3–0	4–2	3–1	2–0	3–1	4–0	0–3	1–0	—	7–2	3–1
Teplice	1–1	1–0	2–0	0–5	2–2	1–2	1–3	1–1	3–1	2–1	0–1	0–1	2–2	1–1	0–2	0–1	—	0–0
Fastav Zlín	0–0	3–1	3–0	0–2	1–2	0–0	2–1	0–1	1–1	1–1	0–4	1–0	0–1	2–6	1–2	0–3	2–3	—

Source: Fortuna Liga
Legend: Blue = home team win; Yellow = draw; Red = away team win.
For upcoming matches, an "a" indicates there is an article about the rivalry between the two participants.

== Season statistics ==
=== Top scorers ===
Final standings

Rank	Player	Club	Goals
1	(Czech Republic) Jan Kuchta	Slavia	15
1	(Czech Republic) Adam Hložek	Sparta	15
3	(Czech Republic) Martin Doležal	Jablonec	14
4	(Slovakia) Ivan Schranz	Jablonec	13
5	(France) Jean-David Beauguel	Plzeň	12
5	(Romania) Nicolae Stanciu	Slavia	12
5	(Czech Republic) Lukáš Juliš	Sparta	12
8	(Senegal) Abdallah Sima	Slavia	11
8	(Brazil) Dyjan de Azevedo	Ostrava	11
10	(Czech Republic) Jan Kliment	Slovácko	10
10	(Czech Republic) Michal Škoda	Mladá Boleslav	10
10	(Sweden) David Moberg Karlsson	Sparta	10

=== Hat-tricks ===
Matchweek	Date	Player	For	Against	Result
1	23 August 2020	(Czech Republic) Stanislav Tecl	Slavia	České Budějovice	6–0 (A)
6	4 October 2020	(Czech Republic) Michael Rabušic	Liberec	Příbram	3–0 (H)
12	27 January 2021	(Czech Republic) Jan Kuchta	Slavia	Zlín	6–2 (A)
19	14 February 2021	(Sweden) David Moberg Karlsson	Sparta	Karviná	4–3 (H)
25	3 April 2021	(Czech Republic) Ladislav Krejčí	Sparta	Teplice	7–2 (H)
29	25 April 2021	(Czech Republic) Adam Hložek	Sparta	Opava	4–2 (H)
31	7 May 2021	(Czech Republic) Martin Doležal	Jablonec	Teplice	4–1 (H)
34	29 May 2021	(Czech Republic) Adam Hložek^{4}	Sparta	Zbrojovka	6–1 (H)

Notes

^{4} Player scored 4 goals
(H) – Home team
(A) – Away team

=== Clean sheets ===
Final standings

Rank	Player	Club	Clean sheets
1	(Czech Republic) Ondřej Kolář	Slavia	16
2	(Czech Republic) Jan Laštůvka	Ostrava	10
2	(Czech Republic) Stanislav Dostál	Zlín	10
2	(Czech Republic) Aleš Mandous	Olomouc	10
2	(Slovakia) Patrik Le Giang	Bohemians 1905	10
6	(Romania) Florin Niță	Sparta	9
7	(Czech Republic) Vít Nemrava	Slovácko	8
7	(Czech Republic) Jan Hanuš	Jablonec	8
9	(Czech Republic) Marek Boháč	Pardubice	7
9	(Czech Republic) Jindřich Staněk	Plzeň	7

== Awards ==
=== Monthly awards ===
Month	Player of the Month		Manager of the Month	
Month	Player	Club	Manager	Club
August	(Czech Republic) Lukáš Juliš	Sparta	(Czech Republic) Václav Kotal	Sparta
September	(Czech Republic) Adam Hložek	Sparta	(Czech Republic) Radoslav Látal	Sigma Olomouc
October	N/A		N/A	
November	(Czech Republic) Tomáš Poznar	Fastav Zlín	(Czech Republic) David Horejš	České Budějovice
December	(Senegal) Abdallah Sima	Slavia	(Czech Republic) Petr Rada	Jablonec
January	(Czech Republic) Jan Kuchta	Slavia	(Czech Republic) Jindřich Trpišovský	Slavia
February	(Sweden) David Karlsson	Sparta	(Czech Republic) Pavel Vrba	Sparta
March	(Romania) Nicolae Stanciu	Slavia	(Czech Republic) Jindřich Trpišovský	Slavia
April	(Slovakia) Ivan Schranz	Jablonec	(Czech Republic) Petr Rada	Jablonec
May	(Czech Republic) Adam Hložek	Sparta	(Czech Republic) Pavel Vrba	Sparta

=== Annual awards ===
Award	Winner	Club
Player of the Season	(Czech Republic) Lukáš Provod	Slavia
Manager of the Season	(Czech Republic) Jindřich Trpišovský	Slavia
International of the Season	(Romania) Nicolae Stanciu	Slavia
Fans' Player of the Season	(Romania) Nicolae Stanciu	Slavia
Newcomer of the Season	(Senegal) Abdallah Sima	Slavia
Figure of the Season	(Czech Republic) Tomáš Hübschman	Jablonec
Goalkeeper of the Season	(Czech Republic) Ondřej Kolář	Slavia
Defender of the Season	(Czech Republic) Ondřej Kúdela	Slavia
Midfield of the Season	(Czech Republic) Lukáš Provod	Slavia
Forward of the Season	(Czech Republic) Adam Hložek	Sparta

Team of the Season
Goalkeeper	(Czech Republic) Ondřej Kolář (Slavia Prague)			
Defenders	(Denmark) Alexander Bah (Slavia Prague)	(Czech Republic) Ondřej Kúdela (Slavia Prague)	(Czech Republic) David Zima (Slavia Prague)	(Czech Republic) Jan Bořil (Slavia Prague)
Midfielders	(Senegal) Abdallah Sima (Slavia Prague)	(Romania) Nicolae Stanciu (Slavia Prague)	(Czech Republic) Tomáš Holeš (Slavia Prague)	(Czech Republic) Lukáš Provod (Slavia Prague)
Forwards	(Nigeria) Peter Olayinka (Slavia Prague)		(Czech Republic) Jan Kuchta (Slavia Prague)	

== Attendance ==
Pos	Team	Total	High	Low	Average	Change
1	Slavia Prague	0	0	0	0	n/a
2	Sparta Prague	0	0	0	0	n/a
3	Viktoria Plzeň	0	0	0	0	n/a
4	Baník Ostrava	0	0	0	0	n/a
5	Slovan Liberec	0	0	0	0	n/a
6	České Budějovice	0	0	0	0	n/a
7	Slovácko	0	0	0	0	n/a
8	Teplice	0	0	0	0	n/a
9	Bohemians 1905	0	0	0	0	n/a
10	Sigma Olomouc	0	0	0	0	n/a
11	Fastav Zlín	0	0	0	0	n/a
12	Opava	0	0	0	0	n/a
13	Mladá Boleslav	0	0	0	0	n/a
14	Karviná	0	0	0	0	n/a
15	Jablonec	0	0	0	0	n/a
16	Brno	0	0	0	0	n/a
17	Pardubice	0	0	0	0	n/a
18	Příbram	0	0	0	0	n/a
	League total	0	0	0	0	n/a

Updated to games played on 1 August 2020

== See also ==
- 2020–21 Czech Cup
- 2020–21 Czech National Football League
