= Tomáš Holeš =

Czech footballer (born 1993)

- Holeš playing for Slavia Prague in 2026

Personal information
- Date of birth: 31 March 1993 (age 33)
- Place of birth: Nové Město na Moravě, Czech Republic
- Height: 1.80 m (5 ft 11 in)
- Positions: Centre-back; right-back; defensive midfielder

Team information
- Current team: Slavia Prague
- Number: 3

Youth career
- Hradec Králové

Senior career*
Years	Team	Apps	(Gls)
2012–2018	Hradec Králové	121	(4)
2017–2018	→ Jablonec (loan)	18	(1)
2018–2019	Jablonec	53	(6)
2019–	Slavia Prague	178	(17)

International career
2012–2015	Czech Republic U21	10	(0)
2020–2026	Czech Republic	43	(2)
- * Club domestic league appearances and goals as of 31 October 2026

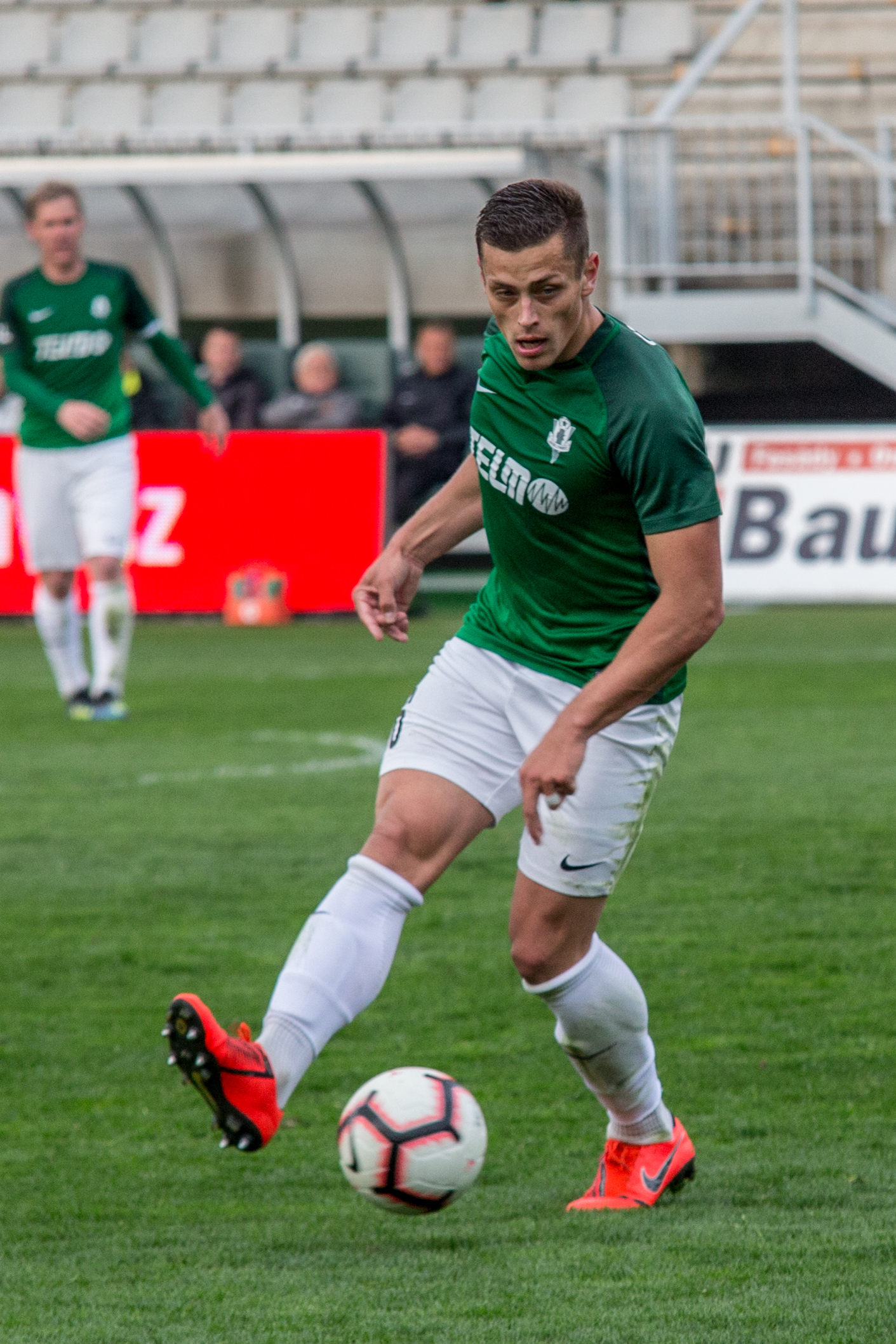
Holeš playing for Jablonec in 2019

Tomáš Holeš (born 31 March 1993) is a Czech professional footballer who plays as a centre-back, right-back or defensive midfielder for Czech First League club Slavia Prague.

== Club career ==
=== Hradec Králové ===
Before playing senior football, Holeš played in the youth league for Hradec Králové in 2011. He debuted at 18 years old in a Czech First League match against Liberec. Holeš captained Hradec Králové during the 2016–17 season. Holeš started the 2017–18 season going into the final year of his contract with Hradec Králové, sitting out the traditional team photo at the start of the season.

=== Later career ===
After spending the second half of the 2017–18 Czech First League on loan at Jablonec, who he helped to Europa League qualification, Holeš joined Jablonec on a permanent transfer, signing a four-year contract. After a season at Jablonec he joined First League champions Slavia Prague in the summer of 2019. On 6 January 2022, Holeš announced a new contract with Slavia Prague that will last until 2026.

== International career ==
Having represented Czech Republic U21, Holeš debuted for the senior side in a UEFA Nations League match against Scotland on 7 September 2020, playing the full 90 minutes as the Czech Republic lost 1–2.

On 25 May 2021, Holeš was included in the final 26-man squad for the postponed UEFA Euro 2020 tournament. On 27 June 2021, he scored the Czech Republic's first goal in the 68th minute and provided an assist for the second goal 12 minutes later in a 2–0 win over Netherlands to qualify for the UEFA Euro 2020 quarterfinals.

On 31 May 2026, Holeš was selected in the 26-man squad for the 2026 FIFA World Cup. He made two appearances at the World Cup before announcing his international retirement at the end of the tournament.

== Career statistics ==
=== Club ===
As of 31 October 2026

Appearances and goals by club, season and competition
Club	Season	League			Czech Cup		Continental		Other		Total	
Club	Season	Division	Apps	Goals	Apps	Goals	Apps	Goals	Apps	Goals	Apps	Goals
Hradec Králové	2011–12	Czech First League	12	0	0	0	—		—		12	0
Hradec Králové	2012–13	Czech First League	24	1	0	0	—		—		24	1
Hradec Králové	2013–14	Czech National Football League	14	1	0	0	—		—		14	1
Hradec Králové	2014–15	Czech First League	30	0	1	0	—		—		31	0
Hradec Králové	2015–16	Czech National Football League	26	1	3	1	—		—		29	2
Hradec Králové	2016–17	Czech First League	15	1	1	0	—		—		16	1
Hradec Králové	Total		121	4	5	1	—		—		126	5
Jablonec	2017–18	Czech First League	18	1	5	0	—		—		23	1
Jablonec	2018–19	Czech First League	35	5	2	1	6 (Note: Appearances in UEFA Europa League)	0	—		43	6
Jablonec	Total		53	6	7	1	6	0	—		66	7
Slavia Prague	2019–20	Czech First League	15	1	2	0	1 (Note: Appearance(s) in UEFA Champions League)	0	0	0	18	1
Slavia Prague	2020–21	Czech First League	24	6	3	1	11 (Note: Two appearances in UEFA Champions League, nine appearances and one goal in UEFA Europa League)	1	—		38	8
Slavia Prague	2021–22	Czech First League	27	2	2	0	13 (Note: Two appearances in UEFA Champions League, two appearances in UEFA Europa League, nine appearances and one goal in UEFA Europa Conference League)	1	—		42	3
Slavia Prague	2022–23	Czech First League	21	0	2	0	6 (Note: Appearances in UEFA Europa Conference League)	1	—		29	1
Slavia Prague	2023–24	Czech First League	28	3	1	0	11	0	—		40	3
Slavia Prague	2024–25	Czech First League	28	2	1	0	10 (Note: Three appearances in UEFA Champions League, seven appearances in UEFA Europa League)	0	—		39	2
Slavia Prague	2025–26	Czech First League	25	2	1	0	4	0	—		30	2
Slavia Prague	2026–27	Czech First League	11	1	0	0	1	0	—		12	1
Slavia Prague	Total		179	17	12	1	57	3	0	0	248	21
Career total			353	27	24	3	63	3	0	0	440	33

=== International ===
Appearances and goals by national team and year
National team	Year	Apps	Goals
Czech Republic	2020	4	1
Czech Republic	2021	12	1
Czech Republic	2022	1	0
Czech Republic	2023	9	0
Czech Republic	2024	8	0
Czech Republic	2025	4	0
Czech Republic	2026	5	0
Total		43	2

Scores and results list the Czech Republic's goal tally first, score column indicates score after each Holeš goal.

List of international goals scored by Tomáš Holeš
No.	Date	Venue	Opponent	Score	Result	Competition
1	7 October 2020	AEK Arena, Larnaca, Cyprus	Cyprus	1–0	2–1	Friendly
2	27 June 2021	Puskás Aréna, Budapest, Hungary	Netherlands	1–0	2–0	UEFA Euro 2020

== Honours ==
Slavia Prague

- Czech First League: 2019–20, 2020–21, 2024–25, 2025–26
- Czech Cup: 2020–21, 2022–23

Individual

- Czech First League Player of the Season: 2021–22
- Czech First League Midfield of the Season: 2021–22
