= Ondřej Kolář (footballer) =

Czech footballer (born 1994)

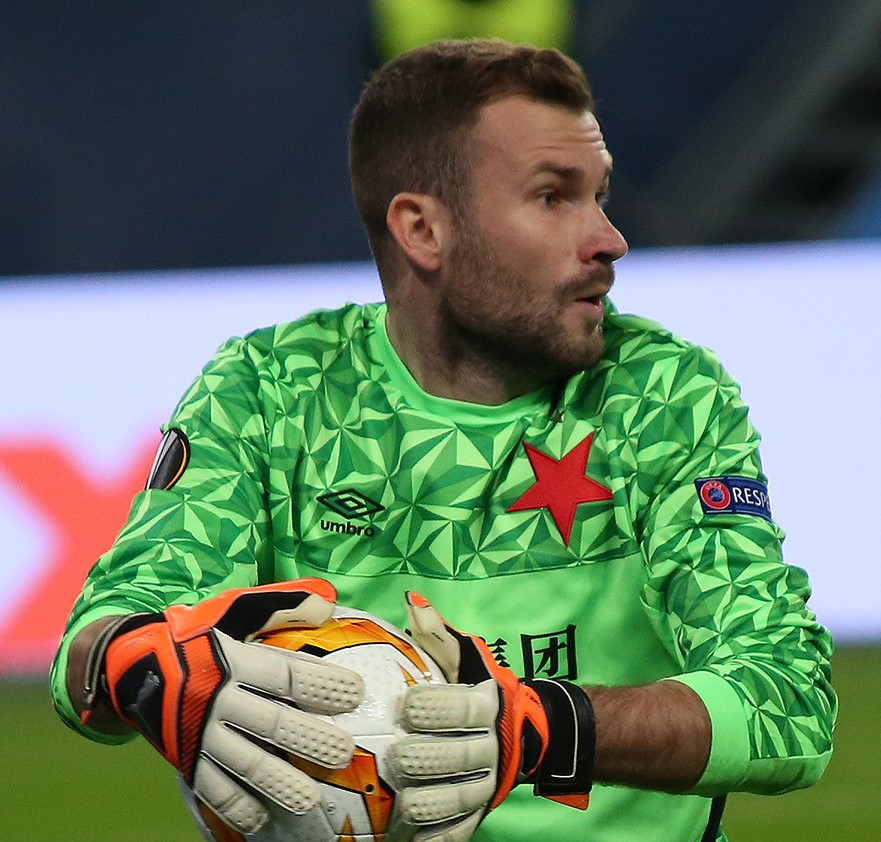
- Kolář with Slavia Prague in 2018

Personal information
- Date of birth: 17 October 1994 (age 32)
- Place of birth: Liberec, Czech Republic
- Height: 1.93 m (6 ft 4 in)
- Position: Goalkeeper

Team information
- Current team: Slavia Prague
- Number: 1

Youth career
- Slovan Liberec

Senior career*
Years	Team	Apps	(Gls)
2013–2018	Slovan Liberec	30	(0)
2013	→ Varnsdorf (loan)	1	(0)
2016	→ Varnsdorf (loan)	7	(0)
2018–	Slavia Prague	157	(1)

International career
2011–2012	Czech Republic U18	4	(0)
2012–2013	Czech Republic U19	4	(0)
2014	Czech Republic U20	3	(0)
2016	Czech Republic U21	1	(0)
2019	Czech Republic	1	(0)
- * Club domestic league appearances and goals as of 24 May 2026

Ondřej Kolář (born 17 October 1994) is a Czech professional footballer who plays as a goalkeeper for Czech First League club Slavia Prague. He made a single appearance for the Czech Republic in 2019.

== Club career ==
In the 2016–17 season, Kolář spent the first half on loan at Varnsdorf in the second-tier Czech National Football League, before playing with the Liberec junior side in the second half.

Kolář transferred to Slavia Prague in January 2018 with a worth €1 million, making him the most expensive goalkeeper signing in Czech First League history. On 26 July that year, he signed a new contract until June 2022.

In the 2019–20 season, Kolář kept his 17th clean sheet in his 25th match of the season, equalling the league record of clean sheets in a season held by Zdeněk Jánoš and Petr Čech. Earlier that season, Kolář recorded a sequence of 788 minutes without conceding a goal in the league, second of all time behind Čech's mark from the 2001–02 season. He finished the season on a new record 23 clean sheets from 31 games. He also reached his 50th clean sheet in 101 matches, becoming the fastest player to that mark. He was recognised for these achievements by being awarded the league's Player of the Season accolade by the Ligová fotbalová asociace.

On 29 August 2020, Kolář scored a last minute penalty in a 3–0 victory against Příbram. During a Europa League match against Rangers on 18 March 2021, he was stretchered off with a fractured skull after a ducking into the boot of Kemar Roofe. The incident resulted in UEFA giving Roofe a four-match ban and Kolář being forced to wear a head guard for the remainder of his career.

Kolář lost his status as Slavia's first choice goalkeeper at the start of the 2022–23 season behind Aleš Mandous. On 2 October 2022, he kept a clean sheet in a 3–0 league victory over Slovan Liberec.

== International career ==
On 17 November 2019, Kolář made his debut for the senior Czech Republic national team in a UEFA Euro 2020 qualifying match against Bulgaria. He conceded a goal in the second half from a set piece as Bulgaria won the game 1–0. He was not selected for the UEFA Euro 2020 after expressing health concerns following recovery from a head injury.

== Career statistics ==
=== Club ===
As of match played 24 May 2026

Appearances and goals by club, season and competition
Club	Season	League			Czech Cup		Continental		Other		Total	
Club	Season	Division	Apps	Goals	Apps	Goals	Apps	Goals	Apps	Goals	Apps	Goals
Slovan Liberec	2012–13	Czech First League	0	0	0	0	—		—		1	0
Slovan Liberec	2013–14	Czech First League	1	0	0	0	—		—		0	0
Slovan Liberec	2014–15	Czech First League	16	0	1	0	0	0	—		17	0
Slovan Liberec	2015–16	Czech First League	0	0	0	0	—		0	0	0	0
Slovan Liberec	2016–17	Czech First League	0	0	0	0	0	0	—		0	0
Slovan Liberec	2017–18	Czech First League	13	0	1	0	—		—		14	0
Slovan Liberec	Total		30	0	2	0	0	0	0	0	32	0
Varnsdorf (loan)	2012–13	Czech National Football League	1	0	0	0	—		—		1	0
Varnsdorf (loan)	2016–17	Czech National Football League	7	0	0	0	—		—		7	0
Slavia Prague	2017–18	Czech First League	14	0	3	0	—		—		17	0
Slavia Prague	2018–19	Czech First League	33	0	2	0	14 (Note: Two appearances in UEFA Champions League, twelve appearances in UEFA Europa League)	0	—		49	0
Slavia Prague	2019–20	Czech First League	31	0	1	0	8 (Note: Appearances in UEFA Champions League)	0	1 (Note: Appearance in Czech-Slovak Supercup)	0	41	0
Slavia Prague	2020–21	Czech First League	31	1	3	0	14 (Note: Two appearances in UEFA Champions League, twelve appearances in UEFA Europa League)	0	—		48	1
Slavia Prague	2021–22	Czech First League	15	0	0	0	6 (Note: Two appearances in UEFA Champions League, two appearances in UEFA Europa League, two appearances in UEFA Conference League)	0	—		21	0
Slavia Prague	2022–23	Czech First League	25	0	4	0	4 (Note: Appearances in UEFA Conference League)	0	—		33	0
Slavia Prague	2023–24	Czech First League	6	0	1	0	4 (Note: Appearances in UEFA Europa League)	0	—		11	0
Slavia Prague	2025–26	Czech First League	2	0	—		—		—		2	0
Slavia Prague	Total		157	1	14	0	50	0	1	0	222	1
Career total			195	1	16	0	50	0	1	0	262	1

=== International ===
Appearances and goals by national team and year
National team	Year	Apps	Goals
Czech Republic
Czech Republic	2019	1	0
Total		1	0

== Honours ==
Slavia Prague

- Czech First League: 2018–19, 2019–20, 2020–21, 2024–25
- Czech Cup: 2017–18, 2018–19, 2020–21, 2022–23
- Czech-Slovak Supercup: 2019
