= Marek Boháč =

Czech footballer

Personal information
- Date of birth: 31 October 1988 (age 38)
- Place of birth: Prague, Czechoslovakia
- Position: Goalkeeper

Youth career
- Slavia Prague

Senior career*
Years	Team	Apps	(Gls)
2009–2014	Viktoria Žižkov	47	(0)
2010	→ Vlašim (loan)	8	(0)
2014–2020	Příbram	59	(0)
2014	→ Vlašim (loan)	4	(0)
2020–2022	Pardubice	30	(0)
- * Club domestic league appearances and goals as of 31 January 2021

Marek Boháč (born 31 October 1988) is a Czech football goalkeeper who last played for Pardubice.
