= Daniel Kosek =

Czech footballer (born 2001)

Personal information
- Full name: Daniel Kosek
- Date of birth: 19 May 2001 (age 25)
- Place of birth: Pardubice, Czech Republic
- Height: 1.83 m (6 ft 0 in)
- Position: Left back

Team information
- Current team: Slovácko

Youth career
- 2008-2016: Pardubice
- 2016–2019: Slavia Praha

Senior career*
Years	Team	Apps	(Gls)
2019–2022	Slavia Praha	1	(0)
2020	→ Slovan Liberec (loan)	1	(0)
2021	→ Bohemians (loan)	10	(0)
2021	→ Zbrojovka Brno (loan)	2	(0)
2022	→ Silon Táborsko (loan)	13	(1)
2022–2023	Silon Táborsko	17	(0)
2023–2025	Chrudim	44	(5)
2025–	Slovácko	0	(0)
2025	→ Slovácko B	3	(0)
2025–2026	→ Artis Brno (loan)	14	(1)

International career^{‡}
2016-2017	Czech Republic U-16	4	(0)
2017-2018	Czech Republic U-17	4	(0)
2018-2019	Czech Republic U-18	4	(0)
2019-2020	Czech Republic U-19	9	(1)
- * Club domestic league appearances and goals as of 24 May 2026 ‡ National team caps and goals as of 25 July 2021 (UTC)

Daniel Kosek (born 19 May 2001) is a Czech footballer who plays as a left back for Slovácko.

On 3 June 2025, Kosek signed a contract with Slovácko until summer 2028.

On 21 August 2025, Kosek joined Artis Brno on a loan deal until end of the season.
