= David Horejš =

Czech footballer and manager (born 1977)

Personal information
- Date of birth: 19 May 1977 (age 49)
- Place of birth: Prachatice, Czechoslovakia
- Height: 1.85 m (6 ft 1 in)
- Position: Defender

Team information
- Current team: Hradec Králové (manager)

Senior career*
Years	Team	Apps	(Gls)
2000–2012	České Budějovice	179	(9)
2005–2006	→ Brno (loan)	22	(1)

Managerial career
- 2012–2015: České Budějovice (youth)
- 2015: České Budějovice (assistant)
- 2015–2022: České Budějovice
- 2022–2023: Jablonec
- 2024–: Hradec Králové
- * Club domestic league appearances and goals as of 29 July 2011

David Horejš (born 19 May 1977) is a Czech football manager and former player. He was the club captain.

On 28 February 2024, Horejš was appointed as the manager of Hradec Králové.

== Honours ==
=== Managerial ===
SK Dynamo České Budějovice

- Czech National Football League: 2018–19
