= 2019–20 Czech First League =

27th season of top-tier football league in Czech Republic

Czech First League
- Season: 2019–20
- Dates: 12 July 2019 – 26 July 2020
- Champions: Slavia Prague; 6th Czech First League title 20th Czech title
- Relegated: No relegation
- Champions League: Slavia Prague; Viktoria Plzeň
- Europa League: Sparta Prague; Jablonec; Slovan Liberec
- Matches: 271
- Goals: 708 (2.61 per match)
- Top goalscorer: Libor Kozák, Petar Musa (14 goals)
- Best goalkeeper: Ondřej Kolář (19 clean sheets)
- Biggest home win: Jablonec 6–0 Slovácko, Mladá Boleslav 6–0 Příbram, Viktoria Plzeň 7–1 Mladá Boleslav
- Biggest away win: Teplice 1–5 Slavia Prague
- Highest scoring: Viktoria Plzeň 7–1 Mladá Boleslav
- Longest winning run: 8 Slavia Prague
- Longest unbeaten run: 20; Slavia Prague
- Longest winless run: 18; Příbram
- Longest losing run: 6 Příbram
- Highest attendance: 19,370; Slavia Prague 1–1 Sparta Prague; 8 March 2020
- Lowest attendance: 25; Karviná 1–4 Sparta; 31 May 2020
- Total attendance: 1,153,357
- Average attendance: 4,470

The 2019–20 Czech First League, known as the Fortuna liga for sponsorship reasons, was the 27th season of the Czech Republic's top-tier football league. The defending champions were Slavia Prague, who won their fifth Czech title in the previous season. This season was the second one with a new league structure in which 16 clubs play each other home and away, until the league is split up in championship, Europa League and relegation groups.

== Season events ==
On 12 March, the League Football Association announced that all Fortuna liga games had been postponed for the foreseeable future due to the COVID-19 pandemic.

After 2 months, on 12 May, the League Football Association announced that the Fortuna liga would resume on 25 May. The regular season concluded on 14 June 2020.

On 23 July, when the Champions group and the Europa League playoffs had already been finalized, SFC Opava - a team holding 15th place in the table had a suspected coronavirus case among their team members. The Czech League Football Association said it was not possible to complete the league's relegation group as a result of this, and the team was forced to quarantine. None of the three teams in danger of being relegated to the second league, namely Karviná, Opava and Příbram, would be relegated. From the Second League, the victorious Pardubice, and second-placed Zbrojovka Brno would advance to the first league, while third-placed Dukla Praha would not. The relegation group matches were suspended and no team was relegated.

== Teams ==
=== Team changes ===
Promoted from 2018–19 Czech National Football League	Relegated from 2018–19 Czech First League
České Budějovice	Dukla Prague

=== Stadiums and locations ===
Locations of the 2019–20 Czech First League teams
Prague teams in 2019–20 Czech First League

Team	Location	Stadium	Capacity	Ref.
Bohemians 1905	Prague	Ďolíček	5,000	
SK Dynamo České Budějovice	České Budějovice	Stadion Střelecký ostrov	6,681	
FK Jablonec	Jablonec nad Nisou	Stadion Střelnice	6,108	
MFK Karviná	Karviná	Městský stadion (Karviná)	4,833	
FC Slovan Liberec	Liberec	Stadion u Nisy	9,900	
FK Mladá Boleslav	Mladá Boleslav	Lokotrans Aréna	5,000	
SK Sigma Olomouc	Olomouc	Andrův stadion	12,483	
SFC Opava	Opava	Městský stadion (Opava)	7,758	
FC Baník Ostrava	Ostrava	Městský stadion (Ostrava)	15,123	
FC Viktoria Plzeň	Plzeň	Doosan Arena	11,700	
1. FK Příbram	Příbram	Na Litavce	9,100	
SK Slavia Prague	Prague	Sinobo Stadium	19,370	
1. FC Slovácko	Uherské Hradiště	Městský fotbalový stadion Miroslava Valenty	8,000	
AC Sparta Prague	Prague	Generali Česká pojišťovna Arena	18,944	
FK Teplice	Teplice	Na Stínadlech	18,221	
FC Fastav Zlín	Zlín	Letná Stadion	5,783	

== Regular season ==
=== League table ===
Pos	Team	Pld	W	D	L	GF	GA	GD	Pts	Qualification or relegation
1	Slavia Prague	30	22	6	2	58	10	+48	72	Qualification for the championship group
2	Viktoria Plzeň	30	20	6	4	60	22	+38	66	Qualification for the championship group
3	Sparta Prague	30	14	8	8	55	35	+20	50	Qualification for the championship group
4	Jablonec	30	14	7	9	46	41	+5	49	Qualification for the championship group
5	Slovan Liberec	30	14	5	11	50	38	+12	47	Qualification for the championship group
6	Baník Ostrava	30	12	9	9	42	34	+8	45	Qualification for the championship group
7	České Budějovice	30	13	4	13	46	45	+1	43	Qualification for the Europa League play-offs
8	Bohemians 1905	30	12	6	12	38	41	−3	42 (Note: Head-to-head points: Bohemians 1905 4, Slovácko 1.)	Qualification for the Europa League play-offs
9	Slovácko	30	11	9	10	35	35	0	42	Qualification for the Europa League play-offs
10	Mladá Boleslav	30	11	7	12	48	52	−4	40	Qualification for the Europa League play-offs
11	Sigma Olomouc	30	8	12	10	36	37	−1	36	Qualification for the relegation group
12	Teplice	30	7	10	13	29	49	−20	31	Qualification for the relegation group
13	Fastav Zlín	30	7	6	17	25	47	−22	27	Qualification for the relegation group
14	Karviná	30	5	11	14	23	39	−16	26	Qualification for the relegation group
15	Opava	30	5	8	17	16	47	−31	23	Qualification for the relegation group
16	Příbram	30	5	6	19	19	54	−35	21	Qualification for the relegation group

Source: Fortuna Liga
Rules for classification: 1) Points; 2) Head-to-head points; 3) Head-to-head goal difference; 4) Head-to-head goals scored; 5) Goal difference; 6) Goals scored; 7) Fair-play ranking; 8) Draw.

=== Results ===
Each team plays home-and-away against every other team in the league, for a total of 30 matches played each.

Home \ Away	B05	CBU	JAB	KAR	LIB	MLA	OLO	OPA	OST	PLZ	PRI	SLA	SLO	SPA	TEP	ZLN
Bohemians 1905	—	3–2	3–0	0–0	2–1	3–0	3–2	1–0	0–2	0–0	1–0	1–0	0–0	0–1	4–0	2–2
České Budějovice	3–2	—	1–1	3–0	0–1	3–0	2–0	0–1	0–2	0–3	2–0	0–3	2–0	2–2	3–1	2–0
Jablonec	2–0	0–1	—	1–0	0–1	2–1	2–2	2–1	2–1	1–2	4–0	0–2	6–0	2–2	4–1	1–0
Karviná	0–0	0–0	0–1	—	0–1	2–2	1–1	1–1	1–2	1–1	2–0	0–0	0–2	1–4	3–0	2–0
Liberec	3–1	4–2	2–2	3–0	—	2–2	0–1	4–0	0–0	1–2	3–2	0–3	3–1	3–1	1–1	5–0
Mladá Boleslav	2–1	4–2	2–3	1–0	1–3	—	0–2	4–1	2–0	2–1	6–0	0–1	0–0	4–3	3–1	1–1
Olomouc	1–1	1–3	1–1	1–1	1–0	2–2	—	2–0	2–3	0–1	1–2	0–0	2–2	1–0	2–0	1–0
Opava	0–1	2–0	1–2	0–0	1–1	1–0	2–1	—	0–2	0–3	1–0	1–1	1–1	0–1	0–1	0–3
Ostrava	4–2	2–1	1–1	3–0	1–2	2–3	2–2	0–0	—	0–2	3–0	2–2	3–0	0–0	0–1	4–0
Plzeň	1–0	1–0	3–2	3–2	4–1	7–1	3–1	4–0	3–0	—	4–0	0–1	0–2	1–0	1–1	3–0
Příbram	3–2	2–0	4–0	0–2	2–1	0–0	0–0	0–0	0–0	1–2	—	0–1	1–4	0–1	1–1	0–0
Slavia Prague	4–0	4–1	5–0	2–0	1–0	1–0	1–0	2–0	4–0	0–0	3–1	—	3–0	1–1	3–0	1–0
Slovácko	1–2	0–2	1–1	2–0	3–1	1–1	0–0	4–0	0–1	2–1	2–0	2–0	—	0–2	1–1	1–0
Sparta Prague	4–0	3–3	2–0	4–0	0–2	5–2	3–3	2–0	2–0	1–2	3–0	0–3	0–2	—	3–0	2–2
Teplice	1–0	1–3	1–2	0–0	2–0	2–0	1–3	2–2	1–1	1–1	4–0	1–5	0–0	1–1	—	2–1
Fastav Zlín	2–3	2–3	0–1	1–4	2–1	0–2	1–0	2–0	1–1	1–1	1–0	0–1	2–1	0–2	1–0	—

Source: Fortuna Liga
Legend: Blue = home team win; Yellow = draw; Red = away team win.

== Championship group ==
Points and goals were carried over in full from the regular season.

Pos	Team	Pld	W	D	L	GF	GA	GD	Pts	Qualification	SLA	PLZ	SPA	JAB	LIB	OST
1	Slavia Prague (C)	35	26	7	2	69	12	+57	85	Qualification for the Champions League play-off round	—	1–0	0–0	4–0	—	—
2	Viktoria Plzeň	35	23	7	5	68	24	+44	76	Qualification for the Champions League second qualifying round	—	—	2–1	2–0	4–0	—
3	Sparta Prague	35	17	9	9	66	40	+26	60	Qualification for the Europa League group stage	—	—	—	3–0	4–1	3–2
4	Jablonec	35	14	9	12	48	52	−4	51	Qualification for the Europa League second qualifying round	—	—	—	—	1–1	1–1
5	Slovan Liberec (O)	35	15	6	14	55	51	+4	51	Qualification for the Europa League play-offs final	1–3	—	—	—	—	2–1
6	Baník Ostrava	35	12	11	12	47	43	+4	47		1–3	0–0	—	—	—	—

Legend: Blue = home team win; Yellow = draw; Red = away team win.
Rules for classification: 1) Total points; 2) Points earned in regular season; 3) Head-to-head points (regular season); 4) Head-to-head goal difference (regular season); 5) Head-to-head goals scored (regular season); 5) Goal difference (all matches); 6) Goals scored (all matches); 7) Fair-play ranking; 8) Draw.
(C) Champions; (O) Play-off winners

== Europa League play-offs ==
Teams placed between 7th and 10th position will take part in the Europa league play-offs. The best of them will play against the fourth-placed or fifth-placed of the championship play-offs to determine the Europa League play-off winners. The winners will qualify for the second qualifying round of the 2020–21 UEFA Europa League.

First round
Mladá Boleslav	2	2	4
České Budějovice	1	0	1
Slovácko	1	1	2
Bohemians 1905	2	2	4

Second round
Mladá Boleslav	3	1	4
Bohemians 1905	0	2	2

=== Final ===
12 July 2020
17:00

Slovan Liberec	2–0	Mladá Boleslav
Pešek 62'; Mara 90' (pen.)	Report

Stadion u Nisy, Liberec
Attendance: 2,488
Referee: Petr Ardeleánu

== Relegation group ==
Points and goals were carried over in full from the regular season. The relegation group was scheduled to conclude on 7 July but due to three players from MFK Karviná testing positive for COVID-19, the last two rounds of matches were postponed to 23 and 26 July. Then, due to one player from SFC Opava testing positive for COVID-19, the last two rounds of matches were not played. As a consequence, no team was relegated and number of teams for 2020–2021 season was increased from 16 to 18.

Pos	Team	Pld	W	D	L	GF	GA	GD	Pts	OLO	TEP	ZLN	KAR	OPA	PRI
11	Sigma Olomouc	33	9	13	11	39	40	−1	40	—	0–0	—	3–1	—	—
12	Teplice	33	9	11	13	37	51	−14	38	—	—	4–1	4–1	—	—
13	Fastav Zlín	33	9	6	18	30	52	−22	33	—	—	—	—	3–1	1–0
14	Karviná	33	5	12	16	25	46	−21	27	—	—	—	—	0–0	—
15	Opava	33	5	10	18	17	50	−33	25 (Note: Head-to-head points: Opava 4, Příbram 1.)	—	—	—	—	—	0–0
16	Příbram	33	6	7	20	21	55	−34	25	2–0	—	—	—	—	—

Updated to match(es) played on 28 June 2020. Source:
Legend: Blue = home team win; Yellow = draw; Red = away team win.
Rules for classification: 1) Points; 2) Head-to-head points; 3) Head-to-head goal difference; 4) Head-to-head goals scored; 5) Goal difference; 6) Goals scored; 7) Fair-play ranking; 8) Draw.

== Top scorers ==
As of matches played 6 July 2020

Rank	Name	Club	Goals
1	(Croatia) Petar Musa	Slovan Liberec / Slavia Prague	14
1	(Czech Republic) Libor Kozák	Sparta Prague	14
3	(Czech Republic) Lukáš Budínský	Mladá Boleslav	13
4	(Gabon) Guélor Kanga	Sparta Prague	12
4	(Czech Republic) Jakub Řezníček	Teplice	12
6	(Russia) Nikolay Komlichenko	Mladá Boleslav	10
6	(Czech Republic) Martin Doležal	Jablonec	10
6	(Czech Republic) Michael Krmenčík	Viktoria Plzeň	10
6	(Czech Republic) Pavel Bucha	Mladá Boleslav / Viktoria Plzeň	10
6	(Czech Republic) Roman Potočný	Slovan Liberec / Baník Ostrava	10

== Awards ==
=== Monthly Awards ===
Month	Player of the Month		Manager of the Month	
Month	Player	Club	Manager	Club
July	(Czech Republic) Jan Kopic	Viktoria Plzeň	(Czech Republic) Pavel Vrba	Viktoria Plzeň
August	(Czech Republic) Jakub Plšek	Sigma Olomouc	(Czech Republic) Jindřich Trpišovský	Slavia Prague
September	(Czech Republic) Jakub Mareš	Teplice	(Czech Republic) Jindřich Trpišovský	Slavia Prague
October	(Czech Republic) Tomáš Souček	Slavia Prague	(Czech Republic) Martin Svědík	Slovácko
November	(Czech Republic) Jaroslav Drobný	České Budějovice	(Czech Republic) David Horejš	České Budějovice
December	(Czech Republic) Milan Škoda	Slavia Prague	(Czech Republic) Martin Svědík	Slovácko
February	(Czech Republic) Pavel Bucha	Viktoria Plzeň	(Slovakia) Adrián Guľa	Viktoria Plzeň
May	(Czech Republic) Aleš Čermák	Viktoria Plzeň	(Slovakia) Adrián Guľa	Viktoria Plzeň
June	(Czech Republic) Jakub Řezníček	FK Teplice	(Czech Republic) Jindřich Trpišovský	Slavia Prague

=== Annual awards ===
Award	Winner	Club
Player of the season	(Czech Republic) Ondřej Kolář	Slavia Prague
Manager of the season	(Czech Republic) Jindřich Trpišovský	Slavia Prague
International of the season	(Romania) Nicolae Stanciu	Slavia Prague
Fans' Player of the season	(Czech Republic) Adam Hložek	Sparta Prague
Newcomer of the season	(Czech Republic) Pavel Bucha	Viktoria Plzeň
Figure of the season	(Czech Republic) Josef Jindřišek	Bohemians 1905
Goalkeeper of the season	(Czech Republic) Ondřej Kolář	Slavia Prague
Defender of the season	(Czech Republic) Jakub Brabec	Viktoria Plzeň
Midfield of the season	(Romania) Nicolae Stanciu	Slavia Prague
Forward of the season	(Croatia) Petar Musa	Slovan Liberec / Slavia Prague

== Attendances ==
Pos	Team	Total	High	Low	Average	Change
1	Slavia Prague	184,466	19,370	90	10,851	−19.7%
2	Sparta Prague	146,777	17,292	120	8,634	−22.0%
3	Viktoria Plzeň	123,440	11,625	160	7,261	−18.3%
4	Baník Ostrava	120,278	13,535	1,722	8,019	−23.2%
5	Slovan Liberec	58,895	8,765	150	3,272	−34.6%
6	České Budějovice	58,530	6,681	120	3,658	n/a
7	Slovácko	55,011	7,288	100	3,667	−12.4%
8	Teplice	54,972	13,112	140	3,436	−3.0%
9	Bohemians 1905	54,179	6,277	125	3,386	−19.9%
10	Sigma Olomouc	51,402	8,119	114	3,024	−34.9%
11	Fastav Zlín	49,243	5,898	125	3,078	−19.6%
12	Opava	42,235	6,087	55	2,640	−17.3%
13	Mladá Boleslav	40,788	5,000	287	2,719	−6.1%
14	Karviná	40,213	4,833	25	2,681	−12.1%
15	Jablonec	37,124	4,863	100	2,320	−19.9%
16	Příbram	35,804	5,862	120	2,238	−34.6%
	League total	1,153,357	19,370	25	4,470	−19.3%

== See also ==
- 2019–20 Czech Cup
- 2019–20 Czech National Football League
