= Jan Jeřábek (footballer, born 1984) =

Czech footballer

Personal information
- Date of birth: 12 February 1984 (age 42)
- Place of birth: Czechoslovakia
- Height: 1.83 m (6 ft 0 in)
- Position: Midfielder

Youth career
- 1997–2002: AFK Chrudim
- 2002–2006: SK Holcim Prachovice

Senior career*
Years	Team	Apps	(Gls)
2006–2023	FK Pardubice	298	(32)
2023-	FC Hlinsko		
- * Club domestic league appearances and goals as of 31 January 2021

Jan Jeřábek (born 12 February 1984) is a Czech football midfielder who played for FK Pardubice.

In a Bohemian Football League match against SK Kladno in November 2011, Jeřábek scored four goals, including two from the penalty spot as Pardubice ran out 5–2 winners.
