= 2020–21 Czech Cup =

MOL Cup

Tournament details
- Country: Czech Republic
- Teams: 103

Final positions
- Champions: Slavia Prague (6th title)
- Runners-up: Viktoria Plzeň

The 2020–21 Czech Cup, known as the MOL Cup for sponsorship reasons, was the 28th season of the annual knockout football tournament of the Czech Republic. It began with the first round on 11 August 2020 and ended with the final on 20 May 2021. The winner of the cup gained the right to play in the third qualifying round of the 2021–22 UEFA Europa League.

== Teams ==
Round	Clubs remaining	Clubs involved	Winners from previous round	New entries this round	Leagues entering at this round
First round	103	86	0	86	FK Pardubice; Czech 2. Liga; Bohemian Football League; Moravian–Silesian Football League
Second round	59	54	42	12	Czech First League – teams not playing in UEFA competitions except FK Pardubice
Third round	32	32	27	5	Czech First League – teams entered into UEFA competitions
Fourth round	16	16	16	none	none
Quarter-finals	8	8	8	none	none
Semi-finals	4	4	4	none	none
Final	2	2	2	none	none

== Preliminary round ==
No preliminary round was held.

== First round ==
11 August 2020	1. HFK Olomouc	0–2	FC Slovan Rosice

11 August 2020	SK Beskyd Frenštát pod Radhoštěm	2–0	FC Dolní Benešov

14 August 2020	TJ Spartak Soběslav	1–4	FC MAS Táborsko

15 August 2020	FK Kolín	1–1 (a.e.t.) (4–3 p)	FK Pardubice

15 August 2020	SK Kladno	5–6	SK Benešov

15 August 2020	SK Slaný	1–2 (a.e.t.)	Sokol Hostouň

15 August 2020	FK Brandýs nad Labem	2–4	TJ Jiskra Domažlice

15 August 2020	SK Libčany	0–7	FK Chlumec nad Cidlinou

15 August 2020	TJ Sokol Libiš	0–6	Loko Vltavín

15 August 2020	FK Motorlet Prague	1–0	FK Meteor Prague VIII

15 August 2020	TJ Dvůr Králové	0–3	TJ Jiskra Ústí nad Orlicí

15 August 2020	FC Viktoria Mariánské Lázně	0–6	FC Slavia Karlovy Vary

15 August 2020	FC Chomutov	1–3	Povltavská fotbalová akademie

15 August 2020	FK Olympie Březová	3–2	FK Zbuzany 1953

15 August 2020	Český lev - Union Beroun	0–4	FK Viktoria Žižkov

15 August 2020	SK Vysoké Mýto	4–3 (a.e.t.)	SK Zápy

15 August 2020	FC Slovan Velvary	5–1	MFK Dobříš

15 August 2020	FK Náchod	0–6	FC Hradec Králové

15 August 2020	SK Český Brod	1–1 (a.e.t.) (5–4 p)	FC Písek

15 August 2020	FK Velké Hamry	0–2	FC Sellier & Bellot Vlašim

15 August 2020	FK Baník Souš	2–0	FK Králův Dvůr

15 August 2020	TJ Sokol Srbice	3–0	FK Baník Sokolov

16 August 2020	TJ Tatran Sedlčany	0–6	FC Slavoj Vyšehrad

25 August 2020	FK OEZ Letohrad	0–2	MFK Chrudim

25 August 2020	AFC Humpolec	1–2	SFK Vrchovina

25 August 2020	TJ Sokol Tasovice	4–5 (a.e.t.)	1. SC Znojmo

26 August 2020	FC Strání	1–5	SK Hanácká Slavia Kroměříž

26 August 2020	SK Dětmarovice	1–6	FC Hlučín

26 August 2020	TJ Skaštice	0–6	MFK Vyškov

26 August 2020	1.FC Olešnice u Bouzova	0–4	SK Uničov

26 August 2020	SK Ždírec nad Doubravou	0–3	FC Velké Meziříčí
Note: walkover

26 August 2020	FSC Stará Říše	1–4	FC Vysočina Jihlava

26 August 2020	TJ Unie Hlubina	6–3	MFK Vítkovice

26 August 2020	FC TVD Slavičín	0–3	FK Fotbal Třinec
Note: walkover

26 August 2020	TJ Valašské Meziříčí	0–1	MFK Frýdek-Místek

26 August 2020	SK Jiskra Rýmařov	0–3	1. SK Prostějov
Note: walkover

26 August 2020	FK Nový Jičín	0–3	FC Odra Petřkovice

26 August 2020	TJ Sokol Lanžhot	0–1	SK Líšeň

26 August 2020	FK Admira Prague	0–4	FK Dukla Prague

26 August 2020	FK Komárov	1–3	FK Ústí nad Labem

26 August 2020	FK Přepeře	3–1	FK Varnsdorf

2 September 2020	SK Hranice	0–3	FK Blansko
Note: walkover

2 September 2020	SK Kosmonosy	1–1 (a.e.t.) (0–3 p)	SK Aritma Prague

== Second round ==
12 First League teams not playing in European competitions, except Pardubice, joined 42 of the first round winners in the second round of competition. First round winner SK Uničov was not in the draw. The official date for second round matches is 16 September. Dukla Prague and Hradec Kralové received walkovers to the third round as their scheduled opponents, Aritma Prague and Olympie Březová, decided not to follow the required coronavirus testing protocols.

13 September 2020	SFK Vrchovina	1–2	FC Vysočina Jihlava	Nové Město na Moravě
16:00 CEST

15 September 2020	MFK Frýdek-Místek	1–2	FK Blansko	Frýdek-Místek
16:00 CEST

16 September 2020	TJ Jiskra Domažlice	2–0	FK Ústí nad Labem	Domažlice
16:00 CEST

16 September 2020	FC Slovan Velvary	0–2	Bohemians 1905	Velvary
16:00 CEST

16 September 2020	Sokol Hostouň	0–1	FK Mladá Boleslav	Hostouň
16:00 CEST

16 September 2020	SK Vysoké Mýto	1–2	FK Přepeře	Vysoké Mýto
16:00 CEST

16 September 2020	TJ Jiskra Ústí nad Orlicí	1–0	FC Fastav Zlín	Ústí nad Orlicí
16:00 CEST

16 September 2020	TJ Unie Hlubina	0–6	MFK Karviná	Ostrava
16:00 CEST

16 September 2020	SK Beskyd Frenštát pod Radhoštěm	0–4	FC Baník Ostrava	Frenštát pod Radhoštěm
16:00 CEST

cancelled	Povltavská fotbalová akademie	0–3	FC MAS Táborsko
Note: walkover

cancelled	TJ Sokol Srbice	0–3	FC Sellier & Bellot Vlašim
Note: walkover

cancelled	FK Motorlet Prague	0–3	MFK Chrudim
Note: walkover

cancelled	FK Baník Most – Souš	0–3	SK Dynamo České Budějovice
Note: walkover

cancelled	SK Benešov	0–3	FK Teplice
Note: walkover

cancelled	FK Kolín	0–3	FK Viktoria Žižkov
Note: walkover

cancelled	Loko Vltavín	0–3	1. FK Příbram
Note: walkover

cancelled	SK Aritma Prague	0–3	FK Dukla Prague
Note: walkover

cancelled	FK Olympie Březová	0–3	FC Hradec Králové
Note: walkover

cancelled	SK Český Brod	0–3	FK Chlumec nad Cidlinou
Note: walkover

cancelled	FC Velké Meziříčí	0–3	1. SK Prostějov
Note: walkover

cancelled	SK Hanácká Slavia Kroměříž	0–3	SFC Opava
Note: walkover

cancelled	FC Odra Petřkovice	0–3	SK Sigma Olomouc
Note: walkover

cancelled	1. SC Znojmo FK	0–3	SK Líšeň
Note: walkover

cancelled	FC Hlučín	0–3	FK Fotbal Třinec
Note: walkover

cancelled	FC Slovan Rosice	0–3	FC Zbrojovka Brno
Note: walkover

cancelled	MFK Vyškov	0–3	1. FC Slovácko
Note: walkover

cancelled	FC Slavia Karlovy Vary	3–0	FC Slavoj Vyšehrad
Note: walkover

== Third round ==
30 September 2020	AC Sparta Prague	2–0	FK Blansko	Prague
15:00	Karlsson 74'; Souček 87'	Report		Stadium: Great Strahov Stadium

30 September 2020	FK Chlumec nad Cidlinou	1–3	FK Teplice	Chlumec nad Cidlinou
15:30	Bastin 71'	Report	Vukadinović 32'; Mareš 36', 41'	Stadium: Městský stadion

30 September 2020	MFK Karviná	1–3	FC Sellier & Bellot Vlašim	Karviná
15:30	Haša 52'	Report	Breda 7'; Vrána 41'; Blecha 48'	Stadium: Městský stadion

30 September 2020	FC MAS Táborsko	0–3	Bohemians 1905	Tábor
15:30		Report	Levin 58'; Puškáč 84'; Nečas 90'	Stadium: Stadion Kvapilova

6 October 2020	1. FC Slovácko	6–0	1. FK Prostějov	Uherské Hradiště
18:00	Kliment 19' (pen.), 35' (pen.), 71'; Kadlec 42'; Reinberk 45+1'; Havlík 82'	Report		Stadium: Městský fotbalový stadion Miroslava Valenty

7 October 2020	FC Zbrojovka Brno	1–0	FC Vysočina Jihlava	Brno
15:00	Šumbera 87'	Report		Stadium: Městský fotbalový stadion Srbská

8 October 2020	MFK Chrudim	1–1 (a.e.t.) (6–7 p)	FK Mladá Boleslav	Chrudim
15:30	Yu 14' (pen.)	Report	Budínský 63'	Stadium: Stadion Za Vodojemem

9 October 2020	FC Hradec Králové	2–1 (a.e.t.)	1. FK Příbram	Hradec Králové
15:00	Kodeš 58'; Dvořák 94'	Report	Boakye 75'	Stadium: Všesportovní stadion

19 January 2021	SK Slavia Prague	4–1	FK Dukla Prague	Prague
15:30	Hovorka 17'; Lingr 34'; Hromada 42'; Olayinka 90+3'	Report	Fábry 53'	Stadium: Sinobo Stadium

9 February 2021	FC Slavia Karlovy Vary	3–0	SFC Opava	Karlovy Vary
16:30	Vokáč 30', 77'; Skala 51'	Report		Stadium: Drahovice UMT

10 February 2021	SK Sigma Olomouc	3–1	TJ Jiskra Domažlice	Olomouc
13:00	Hála 15'; Látal 50'; Nešpor 68'	Report	Hrubý 21'	Stadium: Andrův stadion

10 February 2021	FC Viktoria Plzeň	7–0	FK Přepeře	Plzeň
16:00	Bucha 17', 33'; Kalvach 19'; Beauguel 23', 58'; Matějka 44', 89'	Report		Stadium: Doosan Arena
Note: tie reversed

11 February 2021	FC Slovan Liberec	3–1 (a.e.t.)	FK Viktoria Žižkov	Liberec
14:00	Faško 44'; Koscelník 94'; Rondić 99'	Report	Bazal 51'	Stadium: UMT Doubí

23 February 2021	FC Baník Ostrava	2–0	FK Fotbal Třinec	Ostrava
14:00	Pokorný 67', 86'	Report		Stadium: Areál SC Vista
Note: tie reversed

cancelled	TJ Jiskra Ústí nad Orlicí	0–3	SK Dynamo České Budějovice
		Report
Note: walkover

cancelled	FK Jablonec	3–0	SK Líšeň
		Report
Note: walkover

== Fourth round ==
2 March 2021	FC Viktoria Plzeň	3–1	FC Hradec Králové	Plzeň
14:00	Čermák 13', 41', 56'	Report	Dvořák 74'	Stadium: Doosan Arena

3 March 2021	FK Teplice	2–0	FC Zbrojovka Brno	Teplice
14:00	Vukadinović 59'; Kodad 71'	Report		Stadium: AGC Arena Na Stínadlech

3 March 2021	FC Slovan Liberec	1–0	SK Dynamo České Budějovice	Liberec
17:00	Pešek 89'	Report		Stadium: Stadion u Nisy

3 March 2021	SK Slavia Prague	10–3	FC Slavia Karlovy Vary	Prague
17:00	Traoré 3' (pen.); Višinský 24', 58'; Lingr 26', 49'; Tecl 34', 38', 45+1', 86'; Brabec 65' (o.g.)	Report	Masopust 42' (o.g.); Tůma 53'; Fencl 84'	Stadium: Sinobo Stadium

9 March 2021	Bohemians 1905	0–2	SK Sigma Olomouc	Prague
16:00		Report	Houska 19', 51'	Stadium: Ďolíček

17 March 2021	AC Sparta Prague	1–0	FC Baník Ostrava	Prague
16:30	Hancko 89'	Report		Stadium: Great Strahov Stadium

26 March 2021	FK Mladá Boleslav	4–2	1. FC Slovácko	Mladá Boleslav
14:30	Ladra 49'; Preisler 84'; Zmrhal 104'; Budínský 109'	Report	Jurečka 34'; Kalabiška 72'	Stadium: Lokotrans Aréna

27 March 2021	FC Sellier & Bellot Vlašim	2–3	FK Jablonec	Vlašim
14:00	Cervenka 34'; Bassey 80'	Report	Pilař 23' (pen.), 58', 64' (pen.)	Stadium: Stadion Kollárova ulice

== Quarter-finals ==
The match between SK Sigma Olomouc and SK Slavia Prague was postponed due to Slavia Prague's participation in the 2020–21 UEFA Europa League quarter-finals.

7 April 2021	FK Teplice	2–1	FK Mladá Boleslav	Teplice
15:00	Moulis 14', 65' (pen.)	Report	Takács 52' (pen.)	Stadium: AGC Arena Na Stínadlech

7 April 2021	AC Sparta Prague	4–1	FK Jablonec	Prague
15:30	Krejčí 49', 69'; Krejčí 81'; Moberg Karlsson 84'	Report	Schranz 47'	Stadium: Generali Česka pojišťovna Arena

7 April 2021	FC Viktoria Plzeň	1–0	FC Slovan Liberec	Plzeň
15:30	Mihálik 88'	Report		Stadium: Doosan Arena

28 April 2021	SK Sigma Olomouc	0–3	SK Slavia Prague	Olomouc
14:00		Report	Kuchta 45'; Stanciu 56'; Ševčík 59'	Stadium: Andrův stadion

== Semi-finals ==
28 April 2021	FC Viktoria Plzeň	1–0	FK Teplice	Plzeň
17:00	Havel 76'	Report		Stadium: Doosan Arena; Referee: Pavel Orel

5 May 2021	AC Sparta Prague	0–3	SK Slavia Prague	Prague
17:30		Report	Kuchta 25', 53'; Holeš 30'	Stadium: Generali Česka pojišťovna Arena; Referee: Zbynek Proske

== Final ==
20 May 2021	FC Viktoria Plzeň	0–1	SK Slavia Prague	Plzeň
17:00		Report	Sima 73'	Stadium: Doosan Arena; Referee: Roman Hrubes

== See also ==
- 2020–21 Czech First League
- 2020–21 Czech National Football League
