= List of Czech football transfers winter 2023–24 =

This is a list of Czech football transfers for the 2023–24 winter transfer window. Only transfers featuring Fortuna Liga are listed.

== Fortuna Liga ==
Note: Flags indicate national team as has been defined under FIFA eligibility rules. Players may hold more than one non-FIFA nationality.

=== Sparta Prague ===
In:

No.	Pos.	Nation	Player
4	MF	(Norway) NOR	Markus Solbakken (from (Norway) Viking)
11	FW	(Albania) ALB	Indrit Tuci (from (Croatia) Lokomotiva)

Out:

No.	Pos.	Nation	Player
5	DF	(The Gambia) GAM	James Gomez (to (Denmark) OB)
39	FW	(Czech Republic) CZE	Václav Sejk (on loan to (Netherlands) Roda JC Kerkrade)

=== Slavia Prague ===
In:

No.	Pos.	Nation	Player
4	DF	(Czech Republic) CZE	David Zima (from (Italy) Torino)
12	DF	(Senegal) SEN	El Hadji Malick Diouf (from (Norway) Tromsø)
33	DF	(Czech Republic) CZE	Ondřej Zmrzlý (from Sigma Olomouc)
36	GK	(Czech Republic) CZE	Jindřich Staněk (from Viktoria Plzeň)
—	MF	(Netherlands) NED	Mohamed Ihattaren (free agent)
—	MF	(Czech Republic) CZE	Lukáš Červ (from Slovan Liberec)
—	MF	(Czech Republic) CZE	Lukáš Vorlický (from (Italy) Atalanta U23)

Out:

No.	Pos.	Nation	Player
22	DF	(Romania) ROU	Andres Dumitrescu (on loan to (Romania) Sepsi OSK)
25	MF	(Slovakia) SVK	Jakub Hromada (on loan to (Romania) Rapid București)
30	DF	(Ukraine) UKR	Taras Kacharaba (to (Slovakia) DAC Dunajská Streda)
—	DF	(Syria) SYR	Aiham Ousou (on loan to (Spain) Cádiz, previously on loan at (Sweden) Häcken)
—	MF	(Czech Republic) CZE	Lukáš Červ (to Viktoria Plzeň)
—	DF	(Ukraine) UKR	Maksym Talovyerov (to (Austria) LASK, previously on loan)
—	DF	(Brazil) BRA	Eduardo Santos (to (Brazil) Red Bull Bragantino, previously on loan)
—	DF	(Czech Republic) CZE	Ondřej Kričfaluši (to Teplice, previously on loan at Vlašim)
—	MF	(Czech Republic) CZE	Matěj Valenta (to Viktoria Plzeň, previously on loan at Slovácko)
—	FW	(Nigeria) NGA	Moses Usor (to (Austria) LASK, previously on loan)

=== Viktoria Plzeň ===
In:

No.	Pos.	Nation	Player
6	MF	(Czech Republic) CZE	Lukáš Červ (from Slavia Prague)
19	MF	(France) FRA	Cheick Souaré (on loan from Vyškov)
32	MF	(Czech Republic) CZE	Matěj Valenta (from Slavia Prague, previously on loan at Slovácko)

Out:

No.	Pos.	Nation	Player
4	DF	(Czech Republic) CZE	Luděk Pernica (to Zbrojovka Brno)
20	MF	(Czech Republic) CZE	Pavel Bucha (to (United States) Cincinnati)
36	GK	(Czech Republic) CZE	Jindřich Staněk (to Slavia Prague)
88	MF	(Czech Republic) CZE	Adam Vlkanova (on loan to (Poland) Ruch Chorzów)

=== Bohemians ===
In:

No.	Pos.	Nation	Player
29	FW	(Czech Republic) CZE	David Huf (on loan from Pardubice, previously on loan at Chrudim)
77	FW	(North Macedonia) MKD	Milan Ristovski (from (Slovakia) Spartak Trnava)

Out:

No.	Pos.	Nation	Player
36	GK	(Czech Republic) CZE	Martin Jedlička (loan return to Viktoria Plzeň)

=== Slovácko ===
In:

No.	Pos.	Nation	Player
15	MF	(Czech Republic) CZE	Patrik Blahút (on loan from (Slovakia) Podbrezová)
27	FW	(Austria) AUT	Marko Kvasina (free agent)

Out:

No.	Pos.	Nation	Player
4	DF	(Czech Republic) CZE	Jaromír Srubek (to Opava)
15	MF	(Czech Republic) CZE	Patrik Brandner (to České Budějovice)
21	MF	(Czech Republic) CZE	Matěj Valenta (loan return to Slavia Prague)
—	DF	(Montenegro) MNE	Marko Merdović (to (Montenegro) Arsenal Tivat, previously on loan at (Slovenia) Radomlje)

=== Sigma Olomouc ===
In:

No.	Pos.	Nation	Player
4	DF	(Czech Republic) CZE	Jakub Elbel (from Prostějov)
27	FW	(The Gambia) GAM	Ebrima Singhateh (on loan from Slavia Prague)

Out:

No.	Pos.	Nation	Player
15	DF	(Czech Republic) CZE	Ondřej Zmrzlý (to Slavia Prague)
44	MF	(Czech Republic) CZE	Jakub Přichystal (on loan to Opava)

=== Slovan Liberec ===
In:

No.	Pos.	Nation	Player
21	FW	(Slovakia) SVK	Lukáš Letenay (from (Slovakia) Púchov)

Out:

No.	Pos.	Nation	Player
8	MF	(Czech Republic) CZE	Lukáš Červ (to Slavia Prague)
22	MF	(Czech Republic) CZE	Tomáš Polyák (on loan to Varnsdorf)

=== Hradec Králové ===
In:

No.	Pos.	Nation	Player

Out:

No.	Pos.	Nation	Player

=== Mladá Boleslav ===
In:

No.	Pos.	Nation	Player

Out:

No.	Pos.	Nation	Player

=== České Budějovice ===
In:

No.	Pos.	Nation	Player
—	MF	(Czech Republic) CZE	Patrik Brandner (from Slovácko)

Out:

No.	Pos.	Nation	Player
7	FW	(Nigeria) NGA	Quadri Adediran (on loan to Baník Ostrava)
23	MF	(Czech Republic) CZE	Jakub Hora (free agent)

=== Baník Ostrava ===
In:

No.	Pos.	Nation	Player
—	FW	(Nigeria) NGA	Quadri Adediran (on loan from České Budějovice)
—	MF	(Slovakia) SVK	Matúš Rusnák (from (Slovakia) Žilina)

Out:

No.	Pos.	Nation	Player
22	MF	(Czech Republic) CZE	Filip Kaloč (on loan to (Germany) 1. FC Kaiserslautern)
32	MF	(Brazil) BRA	Ewerton (loan return to Slavia Prague)
—	DF	(Czech Republic) CZE	Lukáš Cienciala (to Třinec, previously on loan at Prostějov)

=== Teplice ===
In:

No.	Pos.	Nation	Player
27	DF	(Czech Republic) CZE	Ondřej Kričfaluši (from Slavia Prague, previously on loan at Vlašim)
33	GK	(Slovakia) SVK	Richard Ludha (from (Slovakia) Podbrezová)
—	DF	(Czech Republic) CZE	Albert Labík (on loan from Slavia Prague)

Out:

No.	Pos.	Nation	Player
3	DF	(Serbia) SRB	Nemanja Krsmanović (to (Serbia) Spartak Subotica)
44	DF	(France) FRA	Soufiane Dramé (on loan to (Slovakia) Zlaté Moravce)

=== Jablonec ===
In:

No.	Pos.	Nation	Player
—	FW	(Burundi) BDI	Bienvenue Kanakimana (from Vyškov)

Out:

No.	Pos.	Nation	Player
25	MF	(Montenegro) MNE	Vladimir Jovović (to (Uzbekistan) Sogdiana)
27	DF	(Slovakia) SVK	Adrián Slávik (to (Cyprus) Othellos Athienou)
—	FW	(Czech Republic) CZE	Jan Silný (to Kroměříž, previously on loan at Prostějov)

=== Pardubice ===
In:

No.	Pos.	Nation	Player
—	DF	(Czech Republic) CZE	Martin Chlumecký (on loan from Podbeskidzie)

Out:

No.	Pos.	Nation	Player
11	MF	(Czech Republic) CZE	Kryštof Daněk (loan return to Sparta Prague)
30	MF	(Czech Republic) CZE	Jakub Matoušek (loan return to Sigma Olomouc)
—	FW	(Czech Republic) CZE	David Huf (on loan to Bohemians 1905, previously on loan at Chrudim)

=== Zlín ===
In:

No.	Pos.	Nation	Player
11	FW	(Georgia (country)) GEO	Zviad Natchkebia (from (Georgia (country)) Samtredia)
36	FW	(Czech Republic) CZE	Tomáš Schánělec (on loan from Sparta Prague)
80	MF	(Ghana) GHA	Cletus Nombil (from (Slovakia) Petržalka)

Out:

No.	Pos.	Nation	Player
11	FW	(France) FRA	Youba Dramé (free agent)

=== Karviná ===
In:

No.	Pos.	Nation	Player
17	FW	(Slovakia) SVK	Martin Regáli (from (Belgium) Kortrijk)

Out:

No.	Pos.	Nation	Player
3	DF	(Greece) GRE	Stelios Kokovas (free agent)
5	DF	(Czech Republic) CZE	Michal Hošek (loan return to Slavia Prague)
20	MF	(Czech Republic) CZE	Daniel Bartl (free agent)
21	DF	(Czech Republic) CZE	Jan Žídek (retired)

== See also ==
- 2023–24 Czech First League
