= 2022–23 SK Slavia Prague season =

Slavia Prague
2022–23 season
- President: Jaroslav Tvrdík
- Head coach: Jindřich Trpišovský
- Stadium: Eden Arena
- Czech First League: 2nd
- Czech Cup: Winners
- UEFA Europa Conference League: Group stage
- Top goalscorer: League: Václav Jurečka (20); All: Václav Jurečka (25)
- Highest home attendance: 19,370 vs Raków Częstochowa (25 August 2022); 19,370 vs Sparta Prague (23 October 2022)
- Lowest home attendance: 6,697 vs MFK Vyškov (1 March 2023)
- Average home league attendance: 15,173 (27 May 2023)
Home colours	Away colours

The 2022–23 season was the 131st season in the existence of SK Slavia Prague and the club's 30th consecutive season in the top flight of Czech football.

== Season events ==
On 28 July, Matěj Jurásek signed a new four-year contract with Slavia, keeping him at the club until the summer of 2026.

On 31 March, David Hovorka announced his retirement from football due to injury.

=== Transfers ===
On 4 June, Slavia announced the signing of Václav Jurečka from Slovácko, on a three-year contract.

On 11 June, Slavia announced the signing of Eduardo Santos from MFK Karviná, on a four-year contract.

On 17 June, Slavia announced the signing of Ewerton from Mladá Boleslav, on a three-year contract.

On 20 June, Slavia announced the signing of Denis Halinsky from Viagem Příbram, on a three-year contract.

On 2 July, Matěj Valenta returned to Slavia, signing on a four-year contract from Dynamo České Budějovice.

On 15 July, Christ Tiéhi joined Slavia on loan until the winter transfer window.

On 31 August, Slavia announced the signing of Ebrima Singhateh from Paide Linnameeskond on a contract until June 2027.

On 8 September, Srđan Plavšić joined Baník Ostrava on a season-long loan deal.

On 9 December, Slavia announced the signing of Petr Hronek from Bohemians 1905 on a contract until 2025.

On 30 December, Slavia announced that Yira Sor had joined Genk.

On 4 January, Slavia announced the signing of David Pech from Mladá Boleslav on a contract until June 2027.

On 7 January, Slavia announced the signing of Igoh Ogbu from Lillestrøm on a contract until 31 December 2026, with Babacar Sy joining on 9 January on a contract until 30 June 2026 from Silon Táborsko.

On 18 January, Moses Usor joined LASK on loan for the remainder of the season.

On 7 January, Slavia announced the signing of Christos Zafeiris from Haugesund on a contract until 30 June 2027.

== Squad ==
As of match played 27 May 2023

No.	Name	Nationality	Position	Date of birth (age)	Signed from	Signed in	Contract ends	Apps.	Goals
Goalkeepers
1	Ondřej Kolář	(Czech Republic)	GK	17 October 1994 (aged 28)	Slovan Liberec	2018		209	1
28	Aleš Mandous	(Czech Republic)	GK	21 April 1992 (aged 31)	Sigma Olomouc	2021	2026	51	0
31	Jan Stejskal	(Czech Republic)	GK	14 February 1997 (aged 26)	Mladá Boleslav	2021		3	0
Defenders
3	Tomáš Holeš	(Czech Republic)	DF	31 March 1993 (aged 30)	Jablonec	2019		127	13
4	Aiham Ousou	(Sweden)	DF	9 January 2000 (aged 23)	BK Häcken	2021	2026	71	2
5	Igoh Ogbu	(Nigeria)	DF	8 February 2000 (aged 23)	Lillestrøm	2023	2026	18	1
12	Eduardo Santos	(Brazil)	DF	28 November 1997 (aged 25)	MFK Karviná	2022	2026	18	0
18	Jan Bořil	(Czech Republic)	DF	11 January 1991 (aged 32)	Mladá Boleslav	2016		212	11
19	Oscar Dorley	(Liberia)	DF	19 July 1998 (aged 24)	Slovan Liberec	2019		124	4
30	Taras Kacharaba	(Ukraine)	DF	7 January 1995 (aged 28)	Slovan Liberec	2022	2024	76	2
41	Ondřej Kričfaluši	(Czech Republic)	DF	29 March 2004 (aged 19)	Academy	2022		8	0
Midfielders
8	Lukáš Masopust	(Czech Republic)	MF	12 February 1993 (aged 30)	Jablonec	2019		160	21
10	Christos Zafeiris	(Norway)	MF	23 February 2003 (aged 20)	Haugesund	2023	2027	18	1
16	Dominik Pech	(Czech Republic)	MF	9 April 2006 (aged 17)	Academy	2023		1	0
17	Lukáš Provod	(Czech Republic)	MF	23 October 1996 (aged 26)	Viktoria Plzeň	2020		101	12
20	David Pech	(Czech Republic)	MF	22 February 2002 (aged 21)	Mladá Boleslav	2023	2027	8	0
21	David Douděra	(Czech Republic)	MF	31 May 1998 (aged 24)	Mladá Boleslav	2022		44	7
22	Ewerton	(Brazil)	MF	28 December 1996 (aged 26)	Mladá Boleslav	2022	2025	26	4
23	Petr Ševčík	(Czech Republic)	MF	2 May 1994 (aged 29)	Slovan Liberec	2019		118	10
24	Petr Hronek	(Czech Republic)	MF	4 July 1993 (aged 29)	Bohemians 1905	2022	2025	7	0
25	Jakub Hromada	(Slovakia)	MF	25 May 1996 (aged 27)	Sampdoria	2017		94	3
27	Ibrahim Traoré	(Ivory Coast)	MF	16 September 1988 (aged 34)	Fastav Zlín	2019		175	19
32	Ondřej Lingr	(Czech Republic)	MF	7 October 1998 (aged 24)	Karviná	2020		134	39
33	David Jurásek	(Czech Republic)	MF	7 August 2000 (aged 22)	Mladá Boleslav	2022	2026	55	3
35	Matěj Jurásek	(Czech Republic)	MF	30 August 2003 (aged 19)	Academy	2021	2026	31	7
Forwards
9	Peter Olayinka	(Nigeria)	FW	18 November 1995 (aged 27)	Gent	2018		182	50
11	Stanislav Tecl	(Czech Republic)	FW	1 September 1990 (aged 32)	Jablonec	2017		179	40
14	Mick van Buren	(Netherlands)	FW	24 August 1992 (aged 30)	Esbjerg	2016		122	21
15	Václav Jurečka	(Czech Republic)	FW	26 June 1994 (aged 28)	Slovácko	2022	2025	34	25
26	Ivan Schranz	(Slovakia)	FW	13 September 1993 (aged 29)	Jablonec	2021	2024	75	20
29	Daniel Šmiga	(Czech Republic)	FW	2 January 2004 (aged 19)	Baník Ostrava	2022	2026	3	0
Slavia B Players
33	Adam Pudil	(Czech Republic)	MF	7 April 2005 (aged 18)	Academy	2021		1	0
35	Milos Pudil	(Czech Republic)	DF	7 April 2005 (aged 18)	Academy	2021		1	0
44	Erik Biegon	(Czech Republic)	FW	29 April 2004 (aged 19)	Academy	2021		1	0
	Michal Hošek	(Czech Republic)	DF	22 April 2001 (aged 22)	Academy	2019		2	0
	Matouš Nikl	(Czech Republic)	MF	2 February 2002 (aged 21)	1. FK Příbram	2021		3	0
	Jonáš Kneifel	(Czech Republic)	FW	28 March 2002 (aged 21)	Academy	2020		0	0
	Ebrima Singhateh	(The Gambia)	FW	10 September 2003 (aged 19)	Paide Linnameeskond	2022	2027	0	0
Away on loan
	Antonin Kinsky	(Czech Republic)	GK	13 March 2003 (aged 20)	Dukla Prague	2021	2025	1	0
	Jakub Markovič	(Czech Republic)	GK	13 July 2001 (aged 21)	Academy	2019		3	0
	Jan Sirotník	(Czech Republic)	GK	16 February 2002 (aged 21)	Academy	2019	2025	0	0
	Matyáš Vágner	(Czech Republic)	GK	5 February 2003 (aged 20)	Academy	2020		3	0
	David Beránek	(Czech Republic)	DF	8 August 2004 (aged 18)	Academy	2022		0	0
	Denis Halinsky	(Czech Republic)	DF	13 July 2003 (aged 19)	Viagem Příbram	2022	2025	0	0
	Frantisek Matys	(Czech Republic)	DF	5 August 2002 (aged 20)	Academy	2020		1	0
	Filip Prebsl	(Czech Republic)	DF	4 March 2003 (aged 20)	Academy	2020		0	0
	Tomáš Vlček	(Czech Republic)	DF	28 February 2001 (aged 22)	Academy	2019		2	0
	Maksym Talovyerov	(Ukraine)	DF	28 June 2000 (aged 22)	Dynamo České Budějovice	2022	2026	15	0
	Michal Beran	(Czech Republic)	MF	22 August 2000 (aged 22)	Slovan Liberec	2020		8	0
	Filip Blecha	(Czech Republic)	MF	16 July 1997 (aged 25)	Vlašim	2022		0	0
	Marek Icha	(Czech Republic)	MF	14 March 2002 (aged 21)	MAS Táborsko	2022	2025	3	1
	Jan Matoušek	(Czech Republic)	MF	9 May 1998 (aged 25)	1. FK Příbram	2018		13	1
	Filip Simecek	(Czech Republic)	MF	23 January 2003 (aged 20)	Academy	2021		0	0
	Matěj Valenta	(Czech Republic)	MF	9 February 2000 (aged 23)	Dynamo České Budějovice	2022	2026	4	0
	Jakub Zeronik	(Czech Republic)	MF	11 February 2001 (aged 22)	Academy	2019		0	0
	Michalis Voriazidis	(Greece)	MF	1 October 2004 (aged 18)	AEP Kozani	2022		0	0
	Ubong Ekpai	(Nigeria)	MF	17 October 1995 (aged 27)	Viktoria Plzeň	2021		22	2
	Tomáš Rigo	(Slovakia)	MF	3 July 2002 (aged 20)	Ružomberok	2018		3	0
	Srđan Plavšić	(Serbia)	MF	3 December 1995 (aged 27)	Sparta Prague	2021	2024	38	1
	Daniel Fila	(Czech Republic)	FW	21 August 2002 (aged 20)	Mladá Boleslav	2022	2026	16	2
	Filip Horský	(Czech Republic)	FW	9 May 2003 (aged 20)	Academy	2021		1	0
	Adam Toula	(Czech Republic)	FW	11 February 2002 (aged 21)	Academy	2020		0	0
	Moses Usor	(Nigeria)	FW	5 February 2002 (aged 21)	36 Lion FC	2022		28	6
	Babacar Sy	(Senegal)	FW	2 October 2000 (aged 22)	Silon Táborsko	2023	2026	0	0
Players who left during the season
2	David Hovorka	(Czech Republic)	DF	7 August 1993 (aged 29)	Jablonec	2019		35	1
5	Christ Tiéhi	(Ivory Coast)	MF	16 June 1998 (aged 24)	on loan from Slovan Liberec	2022	2022	26	2
20	Yira Sor	(Nigeria)	MF	24 July 2000 (aged 22)	Baník Ostrava	2022	2026	26	9
31	Přemysl Kovář	(Czech Republic)	GK	14 October 1985 (aged 37)	Cherno More	2017		17	0
	Ondřej Karafiát	(Czech Republic)	DF	1 December 1994 (aged 28)	Slovan Liberec	2020		7	0

=== Out on loan ===
Note: Flags indicate national team as defined under FIFA eligibility rules; some limited exceptions apply. Players may hold more than one non-FIFA nationality.

No.	Pos.	Nation	Player
—	GK	CZE	Antonín Kinský (at Vyškov)
—	GK	CZE	Jakub Markovič (at Slovan Liberec)
—	GK	CZE	Jan Sirotník (at Varnsdorf)
—	GK	CZE	Matyáš Vágner (at Vlašim)
—	DF	CZE	David Beránek (at Vlašim)
—	DF	CZE	Denis Halinský (at Vlašim)
—	DF	CZE	František Matys (at Vyškov)
—	DF	CZE	Filip Prebsl (at Slovan Liberec)
—	DF	CZE	Tomáš Vlček (at FK Pardubice)
—	MF	CZE	Michal Beran (at Bohemians 1905)
—	MF	CZE	Filip Blecha (at Zbrojovka Brno)
—	MF	CZE	Marek Icha (at FK Pardubice)
—	MF	CZE	Jan Matoušek (at Slovan Liberec)

No.	Pos.	Nation	Player
—	MF	CZE	Filip Šimeček (at Vlašim)
—	MF	CZE	Matěj Valenta (at Slovan Liberec)
—	MF	CZE	Jakub Zeronik (at Příbram)
—	MF	GRE	Michalis Voriazidis (at Silon Táborsko)
—	MF	NGR	Ubong Ekpai (at Mladá Boleslav)
—	MF	SVK	Tomáš Rigo (at Vlašim)
—	MF	SRB	Srđan Plavšić (at Baník Ostrava)
—	FW	CZE	Daniel Fila (at Teplice)
—	FW	CZE	Filip Horský (at Vlašim)
—	FW	CZE	Adam Toula (at Vlašim)
—	FW	NGR	Moses Usor (at LASK)
—	FW	SEN	Babacar Sy (at Teplice)

== Transfers ==
=== In ===
Date	Position	Nationality	Name	From	Fee	Ref.
4 June 2022	FW	(Czech Republic)	Václav Jurečka	Slovácko	Undisclosed	
11 June 2022	DF	(Brazil)	Eduardo Santos	MFK Karviná	Undisclosed	
17 June 2022	MF	(Brazil)	Ewerton	Mladá Boleslav	Undisclosed	
20 June 2022	DF	(Czech Republic)	Denis Halinský	Vlašim	Undisclosed	
1 July 2022	MF	(Czech Republic)	David Douděra	Mladá Boleslav	Undisclosed	
2 July 2022	MF	(Czech Republic)	Matěj Valenta	Dynamo České Budějovice	Undisclosed	
31 August 2022	FW	(The Gambia)	Ebrima Singhateh	Paide Linnameeskond	Undisclosed	
9 December 2022	MF	(Czech Republic)	Petr Hronek	Bohemians 1905	Undisclosed	
4 January 2023	MF	(Czech Republic)	David Pech	Mladá Boleslav	Undisclosed	
7 January 2023	DF	(Nigeria)	Igoh Ogbu	Lillestrøm	Undisclosed	
9 January 2023	MF	(Senegal)	Babacar Sy	Silon Táborsko	Undisclosed	
29 January 2023	MF	(Norway)	Christos Zafeiris	Haugesund	Undisclosed	

=== Loans in ===
Date from	Position	Nationality	Name	From	Date to	Ref.
14 July 2022	MF	(Ivory Coast)	Christ Tiéhi	Slovan Liberec	31 December 2022	

=== Out ===
Date	Position	Nationality	Name	To	Fee	Ref.
7 June 2022	DF	(Denmark)	Alexander Bah	Benfica	Undisclosed	
16 June 2022	DF	(Ivory Coast)	Mohamed Tijani	Viktoria Plzeň	Undisclosed	
17 June 2022	MF	(Czech Republic)	Ladislav Takács	Baník Ostrava	Undisclosed	
21 June 2022	FW	(Czech Republic)	Denis Alijagić	Olympiacos B	Undisclosed	
22 June 2022	MF	(Czech Republic)	Lukáš Červ	Slovan Liberec	Undisclosed	
1 July 2022	DF	(Czech Republic)	Daniel Kosek	Silon Táborsko	Undisclosed	
1 July 2022	MF	(Denmark)	Mads Emil Madsen	AGF	Undisclosed	
1 July 2022	FW	(Croatia)	Petar Musa	Boavista	Undisclosed	
1 July 2022	FW	(Czech Republic)	Tomáš Malínský	Jablonec	Undisclosed	
19 July 2022	FW	(Bahrain)	Abdulla Yusuf Helal	Persija Jakarta	Undisclosed	
30 July 2022	MF	(Czech Republic)	Daniel Samek	Lecce	Undisclosed	
30 December 2022	MF	(Nigeria)	Yira Sor	Genk	Undisclosed	

=== Loans out ===
Date from	Position	Nationality	Name	To	Date to	Ref.
22 February 2022	DF	(Czech Republic)	Filip Prebsl	Slovan Liberec	End of 2022-23 season	
20 June 2022	DF	(Czech Republic)	Denis Halinský	Viagem Příbram	Undisclosed	
14 July 2022	GK	(Czech Republic)	Antonín Kinský	MFK Vyškov	31 December 2022	
15 July 2022	GK	(Czech Republic)	Jan Stejskal	Slovan Liberec	31 December 2022	
18 July 2022	FW	(Netherlands)	Mick van Buren	Slovan Liberec	31 December 2022	
20 July 2022	DF	(Ukraine)	Maksym Talovyerov	Slovan Liberec	31 December 2022	
29 July 2022	DF	(Czech Republic)	Tomáš Vlček	Pardubice	End of season	
29 July 2022	MF	(Czech Republic)	Jan Matoušek	Slovan Liberec	End of season	
25 August 2022	MF	(Nigeria)	Ubong Moses Ekpai	Mladá Boleslav	End of season	
2 September 2022	MF	(Czech Republic)	Matěj Valenta	Slovan Liberec	31 December 2022	
2 September 2022	FW	(Czech Republic)	Daniel Fila	Teplice	30 June 2023	
8 September 2022	MF	(Serbia)	Srđan Plavšić	Baník Ostrava	End of season	
18 January 2023	FW	(Nigeria)	Moses Usor	LASK	End of season	
1 February 2023	DF	(Ukraine)	Maksym Talovyerov	LASK	End of season	

=== Released ===
Date	Position	Nationality	Name	Joined	Date	Ref
30 June 2022	DF	(Czech Republic)	Ondřej Kúdela	Persija Jakarta	1 July 2022	
1 December 2022	GK	(Czech Republic)	Přemysl Kovář	Retirement		
31 March 2023	DF	(Czech Republic)	David Hovorka	Retirement		

== Friendlies ==
29 June 2022	Slavia Prague (Czech Republic)	1–1	(Greece) Olympiacos	Wels, Austria
18:00 CEST (UTC+2)	Hromada (yellow card) 14'; Ousou 43'	Report	Reabciuk 34'	Stadium: Huber Arena

5 July 2022	Slavia Prague (Czech Republic)	7–1	(Romania) Rapid București	Oepping, Austria
18:00 CEST (UTC+2)	Ewerton 2', 51', 53'; Usor 55'; Jurečka 67'; Valenta 80'; Olayinka 84'	Report	Vojtuš 69'

10 July 2022	Slavia Prague (Czech Republic)	1–0	(Hungary) Puskás Akadémia	Mauth, Austria
17:00 CEST (UTC+2)	Santos (yellow card) 6'; Usor 32'	Report	van Nieff (yellow card) 18'; Zahedi (yellow card) 41'	Stadium: Stadion Wels

13 January 2023	Slavia Prague (Czech Republic)	3–0	(Switzerland) Servette	Algarve, Portugal
13:30 CET (UTC+1)	Provod 22'; Tecl 32'; B.Souare 76'	Report

13 January 2023	Slavia Prague (Czech Republic)	1–0	(Switzerland) Servette	Algarve, Portugal
16:30 CET (UTC+1)	van Buren 56'	Report

== Competitions ==
=== Overall record ===
Competition	First match	Last match	Starting round	Final position	Record							
Competition	First match	Last match	Starting round	Final position	Pld	W	D	L	GF	GA	GD	Win %
Czech First League	31 July 2022	27 May 2023	Matchday 1	2nd	35	24	6	5	98	31	+67	68.57
Czech Cup	19 October 2022	3 May 2023	Third round	Winners	5	5	0	0	15	2	+13	100.00
UEFA Europa Conference League	21 July 2022	3 November 2022	Second qualifying round	Group Stage	12	6	3	3	23	9	+14	50.00
Total					52	35	9	8	136	42	+94	67.31

Last updated: 27 May 2023
Source: Competitions

=== Czech First League ===
==== Regular season ====
===== League table =====
Pos	Team	Pld	W	D	L	GF	GA	GD	Pts	Qualification or relegation
1	Sparta Prague	30	20	8	2	70	29	+41	68	Qualification for the championship group
2	Slavia Prague	30	20	6	4	81	25	+56	66	Qualification for the championship group
3	Viktoria Plzeň	30	17	6	7	55	29	+26	57	Qualification for the championship group
4	Bohemians 1905	30	14	6	10	53	49	+4	48	Qualification for the championship group
5	Slovácko	30	13	7	10	36	38	−2	46	Qualification for the championship group

Source: Fortuna Liga
Rules for classification: 1) Points; 2) Head-to-head points; 3) Head-to-head goal difference; 4) Head-to-head goals scored; 5) Goal difference; 6) Goals scored; 7) Fair-play ranking; 8) Draw.

===== Results summary =====
Overall								Home						Away					
Pld	W	D	L	GF	GA	GD	Pts	W	D	L	GF	GA	GD	W	D	L	GF	GA	GD
30	20	6	4	81	25	+56	66	14	1	0	54	7	+47	6	5	4	27	18	+9

Last updated: 30 April 2023.
Source: See results

===== Results by round =====
Round	1	2	3	4	5	6	7	8	9	10	11	12	13	14	15	16	17	18	19	20	21	22	23	24	25	26	27	28	29	30
Ground	A	H	A	H	A	H	A	H	A	H	A	H	H	A	H	A	H	A	H	A	H	A	H	H	H	A	A	H	A	H
Result	L	W	W	W	W	W	D	W	L	W	L	W	W	W	W	W	W	W	W	D	W	L	W	D	W	D	D	W	W	D
Position	13	6	5	2	1	1	1	1	2	2	2	2	2	2	2	2	1	1	1	1	1	1	1	1	1	2	2	1	1	2

Updated to match(es) played on 30 April 2023. Source: See results
A = Away; H = Home; W = Win; D = Draw; L = Loss

===== Results =====
31 July 2022 1	Hradec Králové	1–0	Slavia Prague	Hradec Králové
16:00 CEST (UTC+2)	Kučera (yellow card) 36'; Vašulín 54'; Reichl (yellow card) 90+1'	Report	Douděra (yellow card) 45+2'	Stadium: Všesportovní stadion Attendance: 5,000; Referee: Miroslav Zelinka

7 August 2022 2	Slavia Prague	4–1	Trinity Zlín	Prague
19:00 CEST (UTC+2)	Icha 10'; D.Jurásek 31', 90+2'; Schranz 85'; Masopust (yellow card) 88'	Report	Procházka (yellow card) 32' (yellow-red card) 70'; Jawo (yellow card) 37' (goal) 49'; Cedidla (yellow card) 59'; Simerský (yellow card) 83'; Silný (yellow card) 86'; Bartošák (yellow card) 88'	Stadium: Fortuna Arena; Attendance: 12,213; Referee: Dalibor Černy

14 August 2022 3	Jablonec	2–3	Slavia Prague	Jablonec nad Nisou
16:00 CEST (UTC+2)	M.Surzyn (red card) 6'; Jovović (yellow card) 24'; Sejk (yellow card) 37'; Polidar 55'; Chramosta 73'	Report	Usor 8'; Schranz (yellow card) 34'; Hanuš 51' (o.g.); Traoré 61'; Mandous (yellow card) 90+5'	Stadium: Stadion Střelnice; Attendance: 5,238; Referee: Ladislav Szikszay

21 August 2022 4	Slavia Prague	7–0	Pardubice	Prague
19:00 CEST (UTC+2)	Douděra 31'; Tecl 40', 49', 57'; Lingr 77'; Usor 79', 89' (yellow card) 84'	Report	Hranáč (yellow card) 20' (yellow-red card) 44'; Vacek (yellow card) 44'; Janošek (yellow card) 66'; Červenka (yellow card) 69'	Stadium: Fortuna Arena; Attendance: 13,269; Referee: Marek Radina

28 August 2022 5	Zbrojovka Brno	0–4	Slavia Prague	Brno
19:00 CEST (UTC+2)	Hrabina (yellow card) 67'; Endl (yellow card) 90'	Report	Tecl 19'; Douděra 28'; Texl 36' (o.g.); Ousou (red card) 58'; Tiéhi 75'	Stadium: Městský fotbalový stadion Srbská; Attendance: 10,200; Referee: Tomas Klima

31 August 2022 6	Slavia Prague	6–0	Teplice	Prague
20:00 CEST (UTC+2)	Holeš (yellow card) 16'; Lingr 21'; Tecl 24', 50'; Schranz (yellow card) 45+3'; Kacharaba 61'; Usor 64'; Tiéhi (yellow card) 84'; Provod 86'	Report	S.Dramé (yellow card) 72'	Stadium: Fortuna Arena; Attendance: 11,122; Referee: Petr Hocek

4 September 2022 7	Slovácko	1–1	Slavia Prague	Uherské Hradiště
19:00 CEST (UTC+2)	Doski 1'; Kadlec (yellow card) 73'	Report	Provod 74' (pen.); Usor (yellow card) 90+6'	Stadium: Městský fotbalový stadion Miroslava Valenty; Attendance: 6,352; Referee: Miroslav Zelinka

11 September 2022 8	Slavia Prague	6–1	Dynamo České Budějovice	Prague
19:00 CEST (UTC+2)	Tecl 18', 45+1'; Schranz 21'; Masopust 52'; Lingr 66'; Ewerton 71'	Report	Potočný 56' (yellow card) 65'; Grič (yellow card) 58'; Hora (red card) 65'; Sluka (yellow card) 82'	Stadium: Fortuna Arena; Attendance: 11,312; Referee: Michal Krepsky

18 September 2022 9	Viktoria Plzeň	3–0	Slavia Prague	Plzeň
19:00 CEST (UTC+2)	Chorý 3' (pen.); Mosquera 21' (yellow card) 63'; Jemelka (yellow card) 45+3'; Pilař (yellow card) 56'; Kalvach 73'	Report	Santos (red card) 2'; Dorley (yellow card) 64'	Stadium: Doosan Arena; Attendance: 11,103; Referee: Petr Hocek

2 October 2022 10	Slavia Prague	3–0	Slovan Liberec	Prague
19:00 CEST (UTC+2)	Ousou 16'; Olayinka 23'; Tecl 29'; Usor (yellow card) 86'	Report	I.Rondić (yellow card) 28'; Mészáros (yellow card) 45+2'	Stadium: Fortuna Arena; Attendance: 11,376; Referee: Dominik Stary

9 October 2022 11	Sigma Olomouc	2–0	Slavia Prague	Olomouc
19:00 CEST (UTC+2)	J.Sláma 20'; M.Chytil 54'; J.Trefil (yellow card) 90+2'	Report	Ousou (yellow card) 38'; Kacharaba (yellow card) 52'; Tiéhi (yellow card) 81'	Stadium: Andrův stadion Attendance: 7,227; Referee: Tomas Klima

16 October 2022 12	Slavia Prague	2–1	Mladá Boleslav	Prague
19:00 CEST (UTC+2)	Jurečka 4'; Dorley (red card) 7'; Lingr 45'; Masopust (yellow card) 83'; Kolář (yellow card) 90+6'	Report	Skalák 11' (pen.); Kubista (yellow card) 39'; Fulnek (yellow card) 79'; Mašek (yellow card) 86'; Karafiát (yellow card) 90+1'	Stadium: Fortuna Arena; Attendance: 10,436; Referee: Michal Krepsky

23 October 2022 13	Slavia Prague	4–0	Sparta Prague	Prague
19:00 CEST (UTC+2)	Jurečka 5'; Hromada 12'; Masopust 30'; Olayinka 45+3' (yellow card) 84'; Tiéhi (yellow card) 80'	Report	K.Daněk (yellow card) 2'; Minchev (yellow card) 64'; J.Mejdr (yellow card) 77'	Stadium: Fortuna Arena; Attendance: 19,370; Referee: Miroslav Zelinka

30 October 2022 14	Bohemians 1905	1–4	Slavia Prague	Prague
15:00 CET (UTC+1)	Květ 2'	Report	Olayinka 3', 79'; Jurečka 30' (pen.); Lingr 76'	Stadium: Ďolíček; Attendance: 6,088; Referee: Tomas Klima

6 November 2022 15	Slavia Prague	3–1	Baník Ostrava	Prague
18:00 CET (UTC+1)	F.Kaloč 53' (o.g.); M.Jurásek 73', 79'; Douděra (yellow card) 85'; Provod (yellow card) 90+2'	Report	F.Kaloč (yellow card) 35'; Fleišman 58'; Cadu (yellow card) 66'	Stadium: Fortuna Arena; Attendance: 16,130; Referee: Tomas Batík

13 November 2022 16	Trinity Zlín	0–4	Slavia Prague	Zlín
18:00 CET (UTC+1)	J.Kolář (yellow card) 77'	Report	Lingr 2', 56'; Douděra 5'; Olayinka 28'; Kacharaba (yellow card) 40'; Santos (yellow card) 64'	Stadium: Letná Stadion; Attendance: 4,988; Referee: Miroslav Zelinka

29 January 2023 17	Slavia Prague	5–1	Jablonec	Prague
15:00 CET (UTC+1)	Jurečka 12' van Buren 65'; Lingr 67'; M.Jurásek 76', 85'	Report	Jovović 45+6'; Šulc (yellow card) 56'	Stadium: Fortuna Arena; Attendance: 13,742; Referee: Dalibor Černy

4 February 2023 18	Pardubice	0–2	Slavia Prague	Pardubice
18:00 CET (UTC+1)	S.Šimek (yellow card) 90+3'	Report	Jurečka 19' (pen.); Ousou (yellow card) 44' (yellow-red card) 90'; Lingr (yellow card) 49'; Santos (yellow card) 62'; Douděra (yellow card) 89'; Olayinka 90+5'	Stadium: Pod Vinicí; Attendance: 4,620; Referee: Jan Machálek

11 February 2023 19	Slavia Prague	2–0	Zbrojovka Brno	Prague
18:00 CET (UTC+1)	Lingr (yellow card) 53'; Ewerton 58' (yellow card) 80' van Buren 85'	Report	Granečný (yellow card) 14'; Texl (yellow card) 31'; Šural (yellow card) 82'	Stadium: Fortuna Arena; Attendance: 12,564; Referee: Dominik Stary

18 February 2023 20	Teplice	1–1	Slavia Prague	Teplice
18:00 CET (UTC+1)	T.Vachoušek 3'; S.Dramé (yellow card) 72'; Mareček (yellow card) 83'	Report	Schranz (yellow card) 15'; Traoré (yellow card) 65'; Tecl 74'; Olayinka (yellow card) 90+5'	Stadium: Na Stínadlech; Attendance: 10,053; Referee: Tomas Klima

26 February 2023 21	Slavia Prague	2–0	Slovácko	Prague
15:00 CET (UTC+1)	Olayinka 12', 73'	Report	Kalabiška (yellow card) 66'; Brandner (yellow card) 90+4'	Stadium: Fortuna Arena; Attendance: 15,619; Referee: Ladislav Szikszay

5 March 2023 22	Dynamo České Budějovice	1–0	Slavia Prague	České Budějovice
17:00 CET (UTC+1)	Čolić (yellow card) 56'; Králik (yellow card) 59'; Adediran 68'	Report		Stadium: Stadion Střelecký ostrov Attendance: 6,316; Referee: Pavel Orel

11 March 2023 23	Slavia Prague	2–1	Viktoria Plzeň	Prague
18:00 CET (UTC+1)	Olayinka 50'; Schranz (yellow card) 68'; M.Jurásek (yellow card) 72'; Lingr 76'; Holeš (yellow card) 90+2'	Report	Chorý 16'; Kalvach (yellow card) 18'; Mosquera (yellow card) 82'	Stadium: Fortuna Arena; Attendance: 18,678; Referee: Dalibor Černý

18 March 2023 24	Slovan Liberec	2–2	Slavia Prague	Liberec
18:00 CET (UTC+1)	Červ 26'; Doumbia (yellow card) 39'; Preisler (yellow card) 63'; Ndefe (yellow card) 89'; Olatunji 90+5'	Report	Olayinka 30' (red card) 89'; Ogbu (yellow card) 45+1' van Buren 65' (pen.); Dorley (yellow card) 67'; Zafeiris (yellow card) 84'	Stadium: Stadion u Nisy; Attendance: 4,758; Referee: Miroslav Zelinka

1 April 2023 25	Slavia Prague	4–0	Sigma Olomouc	Prague
19:00 CEST (UTC+2)	van Buren 45+3'; Lingr 62'; Schranz 75'; Jurečka 90+4'	Report	Sláma (yellow card) 43'	Stadium: Fortuna Arena; Attendance: 16,186; Referee: Ladislav Szikszay

9 April 2023 26	Mladá Boleslav	1–1	Slavia Prague	Mladá Boleslav
16:00 CET (UTC+1)	Kušej 18'; Matějovský (yellow card) 40'; Mareček (yellow card) 52'; Jawo (yellow card) 64'; Šeda (yellow card) 80'	Report	Zafeiris 32'; Schranz (yellow card) 76'	Stadium: Lokotrans Aréna; Attendance: 4,851; Referee: Jan Machálek

15 April 2023 27	Sparta Prague	3–3	Slavia Prague	Prague
19:00 CET (UTC+1)	Vitík (yellow card) 45+3'; Krejčí 59' (pen.) (yellow card) 90+6'; Zelený 71'; Kuchta (yellow card) 76'; Laçi (yellow card) 89'; Ousou 90+3' (o.g.); Čvančara (yellow card) 90+4'	Report	Schranz 40' (yellow card) 58'; Pech (yellow card) 45+3'; Jurečka 54'; Masopust (yellow card) 58'; Ogbu 85'; Hronek (yellow card) 90+1'; Traoré (yellow card) 90+6'	Stadium: Stadion Letná; Attendance: 18,305; Referee: Dalibor Černý

22 April 2023 28	Slavia Prague	3–0	Bohemians 1905	Prague
19:00 CET (UTC+1)	Jurečka 13'; Olayinka 31'; Douděra 36'	Report	Vondra (yellow card) 83'	Stadium: Fortuna Arena; Attendance: 18,974; Referee: Miroslav Zelinka

25 April 2023 29	Baník Ostrava	0–2	Slavia Prague	Ostrava
19:30 CEST (UTC+2)	Fleišman (yellow card) 29'; Tijani (yellow card) 35'	Report	Zafeiris (yellow card) 33'; M.Jurásek 81', 83'	Stadium: Městský Stadion; Attendance: 9,651; Referee: Ladislav Szikszay

30 April 2023 30	Slavia Prague	1–1	Hradec Králové	Prague
15:00 CEST (UTC+2)	Gabriel 19' (o.g.); Ogbu (yellow card) 83'; Zafeiris (yellow card) 84'	Report	Kučera 8'; Ryneš (yellow card) 38'; Bajza (yellow card) 90+9'	Stadium: Fortuna Arena; Attendance: 16,737; Referee: Marek Radina

==== Championship group ====
===== League table =====
Pos	Team	Pld	W	D	L	GF	GA	GD	Pts	Qualification or relegation
1	Sparta Prague (C)	35	23	9	3	76	33	+43	78	Qualification for the Champions League third qualifying round
2	Slavia Prague	35	24	6	5	98	31	+67	78	Qualification for the Europa League third qualifying round (Note: Slavia Prague qualified for the Europa League as Czech Cup winners.)
3	Viktoria Plzeň	35	18	7	10	60	38	+22	61	Qualification for the Europa Conference League second qualifying round
4	Bohemians 1905	35	15	7	13	56	58	−2	52	Qualification for the Europa Conference League second qualifying round
5	Slovácko	35	13	11	11	40	46	−6	50	
6	Sigma Olomouc	35	12	12	11	53	47	+6	48	

Source: Fortuna Liga
Rules for classification: 1) Total points; 2) Points earned in regular season; 3) Head-to-head points (regular season); 4) Head-to-head goal difference (regular season); 5) Head-to-head goals scored (regular season); 5) Goal difference (all matches); 6) Goals scored (all matches); 7) Fair-play ranking; 8) Draw.
(C) Champions

===== Results summary =====
Overall								Home						Away					
Pld	W	D	L	GF	GA	GD	Pts	W	D	L	GF	GA	GD	W	D	L	GF	GA	GD
5	4	0	1	17	6	+11	12	3	0	0	12	1	+11	1	0	1	5	5	0

Last updated: 27 May 2023.
Source: See results

===== Results by round =====
Round	1	2	3	4	5
Ground	H	A	H	A	H
Result	W	L	W	W	W
Position	2	2	2	2	2

Updated to match(es) played on 27 May 2023. Source: See results
A = Away; H = Home; W = Win; D = Draw; L = Loss

===== Results =====
7 May 2023 31	Slavia Prague	6–0	Bohemians 1905	Prague
19:00 CET (UTC+1)	Jurečka 30', 48', 53', 84' (yellow card) 38'; Douděra 57' van Buren 82'	Report	Hůlka (yellow card) 23'	Stadium: Fortuna Arena; Attendance: 17,132; Referee: Ladislav Szikszay

13 May 2023 32	Sparta Prague	3–2	Slavia Prague	Prague
18:00 CEST (UTC+2)	Krejčí (yellow card) 21' (goal) 90+7' (pen.); Haraslín 30'; Sørensen 63'	Report	Provod (yellow card) 25'; Schranz 35'; Ogbu (yellow card) 68'; Tecl 85'	Stadium: Stadion Letná; Attendance: 18,887; Referee: Dalibor Černy

20 May 2023 33	Slavia Prague	2–1	Viktoria Plzeň	Prague
18:00 CEST (UTC+2)	Jurečka 5', 69'; M.Jurásek (yellow card) 14'	Report	Jemelka (yellow card) 43'; Durosinmi 56'; Řezník (yellow card) 84'	Stadium: Fortuna Arena; Attendance: 15,486; Referee: Miroslav Zelinka

23 May 2023 34	Sigma Olomouc	2–3	Slavia Prague	Olomouc
19:00 CEST (UTC+2)	Chvátal 2'; Zifčák 6' (yellow card) 42'; Ventúra (yellow card) 75' (yellow-red card) 78'	Report	Jurečka 21', 35'; Lingr 67'	Stadium: Andrův stadion Attendance: 8,166; Referee: Pavel Orel

27 May 2023 35	Slavia Prague	4–0	Slovácko	Prague
16:00 CEST (UTC+2)	Jurečka 24', 41' (pen.), 61', 89'	Report	Kadlec (yellow card) 23'; Doski (yellow card) 34'; Vecheta (yellow card) 67'	Stadium: Fortuna Arena; Attendance: 14,771; Referee: Jan Všetečka

=== Czech Cup ===
19 October 2022 Third Round	Dukla Prague	0–4	Slavia Prague	Prague
18:00 CEST (UTC+2)	A.Adediran (yellow card) 59'; R.Holiš (yellow card) 83'	Report	Douděra (yellow card) 21'; Ewerton 64'; Masopust 74'; Olayinka 90'; Tecl 90+2'	Stadium: Stadion Juliska

18 November 2022 Fourth Round	Karviná	0–2	Slavia Prague	Karviná
17:00 CET (UTC+1)		Report	Olayinka 18'; Lingr 31' (yellow card) 62'; D.Jurásek (yellow card) 90'	Stadium: Městský Stadion; Attendance: 2,890; Referee: Dalibor Černý

1 March 2023 Quarterfinal	Slavia Prague	4–0	MFK Vyškov	Prague
18:00 CET (UTC+1)	Lingr 12'; Jurečka 19', 62'; M.Jurásek 22' (yellow card) 25'	Report	Alégué (yellow card) 15'; Dweh (yellow card) 57'	Stadium: Fortuna Arena; Attendance: 6,697; Referee: Dominik Starý

5 April 2023 Semifinal	Slavia Prague	3–2 (a.e.t.)	Bohemians 1905	Prague
20:15 CEST (UTC+2)	Douděra 23' (yellow card) 117' van Buren (yellow card) 79'; Lingr 90+7'; Jurečka 110'	Report	Prekop 14'; Hála (yellow card) 29' (goal) 84'; Köstl (yellow card) 66'; Kovařík (yellow card) 106'; Vondra (yellow card) 117'; Vrána (yellow card) 120'	Stadium: Fortuna Arena; Attendance: 16,087; Referee: Dalibor Černy

3 May 2023 Final	Sparta Prague	0–2	Slavia Prague	Prague
18:00 CEST (UTC+2)	Kuchta (yellow card) 32'; Krejčí (yellow card) 67'; Højer (yellow card) 79'	Report	Oscar Dorley (yellow card) 45+1'; Douděra 59'; Panák 64' (o.g.) van Buren (yellow card) 73'	Stadium: Stadion Letná; Attendance: 17,037; Referee: Dalibor Černý

=== UEFA Europa Conference League ===
==== Qualifying phase ====
21 July 2022 Second qualifying round 1st leg	St Joseph's (Gibraltar)	0–4	(Czech Republic) Slavia Prague	Gibraltar
19:00 CEST (UTC+2)	C.Pecci (red card) 34'; Juanma (yellow card) 39'; I.Antwi (yellow card) 39'; Pons (yellow card) 70'; Bauti (yellow card) 90'	Report	Sor 21', 32'; Mandous (yellow card) 34'; Ewerton 45+1'; Lingr 56'	Stadium: Victoria Stadium; Attendance: 756; Referee: Ívar Orri Kristjánsson (Iceland)

28 July 2022 Second qualifying round 2nd leg	Slavia Prague (Czech Republic)	7–0 (11–0 agg.)	(Gibraltar) St Joseph's	Prague, Czech Republic
19:00 CEST (UTC+2)	Olayinka 18', 29'; Jurečka 20'; Fila 34'; Tiéhi 49'; Ewerton 90+3'; Traoré 90+4'	Report	Bauti (yellow card) 3'; I.Antwi (yellow card) 72'; Villar (yellow card) 88'	Stadium: Fortuna Arena; Attendance: 15,359; Referee: Tomasz Musiał (Poland)

4 August 2022 Third qualifying round 1st leg	Slavia Prague (Czech Republic)	2–0	(Greece) Panathinaikos	Prague, Czech Republic
19:00 CEST (UTC+2)	Douděra (yellow card) 33'; Schranz 45+2'; Santos (red card) 52'; Usor 56'	Report	Palacios (yellow card) 31' (yellow-red card) 40'; Rubén Pérez (yellow card) 40'; Cantalapiedra (yellow card) 45+3'; Šporar (yellow card) 51'	Stadium: Fortuna Arena; Attendance: 17,314; Referee: Ruddy Buquet (France)

11 August 2022 Third qualifying round 2nd leg	Panathinaikos (Greece)	1–1 (1–3 agg.)	(Czech Republic) Slavia Prague	Athens, Greece
19:30 CEST (UTC+2)	Alexandropoulos (yellow card) 35'; Schenkeveld (yellow card) 44'; Rubén Pérez (yellow card) 47'; Šporar 58'; Magnússon (yellow card) 80'; Juankar (yellow card) 90'	Report	Tiéhi (yellow card) 37'; Mandous (yellow card) 39'; Lingr (yellow card) 54'; Dorley (yellow card) 84'; Schranz (yellow card) 90'; Jurečka 90+5'	Stadium: Leoforos Alexandras Stadium; Attendance: 13,123; Referee: Peter Bankes (England)

18 August 2022 Playoff round 1st leg	Raków Częstochowa (Poland)	2–1	(Czech Republic) Slavia Prague	Prague, Czech Republic
18:00 CEST (UTC+2)	Ivi 29'; Tudor 61'; Papanikolaou (yellow card) 81'; Wdowiak (yellow card) 90+1'	Report	Lingr (yellow card) 54'; Holeš 60'; Ousou (yellow card) 90+2'	Stadium: Fortuna Arena; Attendance: 5,500; Referee: Rohit Saggi (Norway)

25 August 2022 Playoff round 2nd leg	Slavia Prague (Czech Republic)	2–0 (3–2 agg.)	(Poland) Raków Częstochowa	Częstochowa, Poland
19:00 CEST (UTC+2)	Ševčík (yellow card) 53'; Usor 62'; Dorley (yellow card) 82'; Provod (yellow card) 94'; Schranz 120+2' (yellow card) 120+2'; Olayinka (yellow card) 120+4'	Report	Rundić (yellow card) 65'; Arsenić (yellow card) 90'; Tudor (yellow card) 98'; Wdowiak (yellow card) 108'; Ivi (yellow card) 117'	Stadium: Miejski Stadion Piłkarski "Raków"; Attendance: 19,370; Referee: Craig Pawson (England)

==== Group stage ====
Pos	Team	Pld	W	D	L	GF	GA	GD	Pts	Qualification
1	(Turkey) Sivasspor	6	3	2	1	11	7	+4	11	Advance to round of 16
2	(Romania) CFR Cluj	6	3	1	2	5	5	0	10	Advance to knockout round play-offs
3	(Czech Republic) Slavia Prague	6	2	2	2	6	7	−1	8	
4	(Kosovo) Ballkani	6	1	1	4	8	11	−3	4	

Source: UEFA

8 September 2022 1	Sivasspor (Turkey)	1–1	(Czech Republic) Slavia Prague	Sivas, Turkey
21:00 CEST (UTC+2)	Saba 27'; Keïta (yellow card) 29' (yellow-red card) 90+1'; Gradel (yellow card) 60'; Goutas (yellow card) 90+2'	Report	Olayinka 4'; M.Jurásek (yellow card) 8'; Usor (yellow card) 60'; Masopust (yellow card) 66'	Stadium: New Sivas 4 Eylül Stadium; Attendance: 5,472; Referee: Fran Jović (Croatia)

15 September 2022 2	Slavia Prague (Czech Republic)	3–2	(Kosovo) Ballkani	Prague, Czech Republic
18:45 CEST (UTC+2)	Frashëri 26' (o.g.); Tiéhi (yellow card) 27'; Olayinka 34'; Masopust 41'; Traoré (yellow card) 55'; Schranz (yellow card) 69'	Report	Krasniqi 23'; Korenica 29'; E.Sinani (yellow card) 77'; A.Thaqi (red card) 84'	Stadium: Fortuna Arena; Attendance: 18,156; Referee: Willy Delajod (France)

6 October 2022 3	Slavia Prague (Czech Republic)	0–1	(Romania) CFR Cluj	Prague, Czech Republic
21:00 CEST (UTC+2)	Usor (yellow card) 43'	Report	Matias (yellow card) 32'; Janga 45'; Muhar (yellow card) 51'; Deac (yellow card) 60'; Yeboah (yellow card) 74'; Scuffet (yellow card) 90+3'	Stadium: Fortuna Arena; Attendance: 18,271; Referee: Fabio Maresca (Italy)

13 October 2022 4	CFR Cluj (Romania)	2–0	(Czech Republic) Slavia Prague	Cluj-Napoca, România
18:45 CEST (UTC+2)	Deac 11' (pen.); Adjei-Boateng (yellow card) 13'; Yeboah (yellow card) 73'; Cvek (yellow card) 83'; Matias 84'	Report	Olayinka (yellow card) 10'; D.Jurásek (yellow card) 45'; Traoré (yellow card) 66'; Dorley (yellow card) 76'; Ousou (yellow card) 90'; Masopust (yellow card) 90'	Stadium: Stadionul Dr. Constantin Rădulescu; Attendance: 11,218; Referee: Luís Godinho (Portugal)

27 October 2022 5	Ballkani (Kosovo)	0–1	(Czech Republic) Slavia Prague	Pristina, Kosovo
21:00 CEST (UTC+2)	A.Potoku (yellow card) 18'; M.Korenica (yellow card) 28'; E.Kuč (yellow card) 53'; Emërllahu (yellow card) 63'; A.Berisha (yellow card) 84'; Dellova (yellow card) 90+3'; Ar.Thaqi (yellow card) 90+11'	Report	Tiéhi (yellow card) 41'; Lingr 75'; Usor (yellow card) 90+7'	Stadium: Fadil Vokrri Stadium; Attendance: 10,500; Referee: Morten Krogh (Denmark)
Note: Ballkani will play their home matches at the Fadil Vokrri Stadium, Pristina, instead of their regular stadium, Suva Reka City Stadium, Suhareka, which did not meet UEFA requirements.

3 November 2022 6	Slavia Prague (Czech Republic)	1–1	(Turkey) Sivasspor	Prague, Czech Republic
18:45 CET (UTC+1)	D.Jurásek (yellow card) 27'; Goutas 65' (o.g.)	Report	Gradel 28' (pen.) (yellow card) 35'; Vural (yellow card) 90+1'	Stadium: Fortuna Arena; Attendance: 18,132; Referee: Rade Obrenović (Slovenia)

== Squad statistics ==
As of match played 27 May 2023

=== Appearances and goals ===
No.	Pos	Nat	Player	Total		First League		Czech Cup		Europa Conference League	
No.	Pos	Nat	Player	Apps	Goals	Apps	Goals	Apps	Goals	Apps	Goals
1	GK	(Czech Republic) CZE	Ondřej Kolář	33	0	25	0	4	0	4	0
3	DF	(Czech Republic) CZE	Tomáš Holeš	29	1	17+4	0	2	0	6	1
4	DF	(Sweden) SWE	Aiham Ousou	33	1	17+2	1	2+1	0	11	0
5	DF	(Nigeria) NGR	Igoh Ogbu	18	1	16	1	2	0	0	0
8	MF	(Czech Republic) CZE	Lukáš Masopust	30	4	15+4	2	3	1	5+3	1
9	FW	(Nigeria) NGR	Peter Olayinka	36	17	21+2	11	1+1	2	10+1	4
10	MF	(Norway) NOR	Christos Zafeiris	18	1	9+6	1	1+2	0	0	0
11	FW	(Czech Republic) CZE	Stanislav Tecl	42	12	17+13	11	0+4	1	3+5	0
12	DF	(Brazil) BRA	Eduardo Santos	18	0	12	0	1	0	4+1	0
14	FW	(Netherlands) NED	Mick van Buren	22	5	9+10	5	2+1	0	0	0
15	FW	(Czech Republic) CZE	Václav Jurečka	32	25	21+4	20	3+1	3	1+2	2
16	MF	(Czech Republic) CZE	Dominik Pech	1	0	0+1	0	0	0	0	0
17	MF	(Czech Republic) CZE	Lukáš Provod	31	2	9+14	2	0+2	0	3+3	0
18	DF	(Czech Republic) CZE	Jan Bořil	2	0	0+2	0	0	0	0	0
19	DF	(Liberia) LBR	Oscar Dorley	39	0	20+5	0	4	0	7+3	0
20	MF	(Czech Republic) CZE	David Pech	8	0	2+5	0	1	0	0	0
21	MF	(Czech Republic) CZE	David Douděra	44	7	28+1	5	3+2	2	8+2	0
22	MF	(Brazil) BRA	Ewerton	26	5	6+8	2	2+1	1	2+7	2
23	MF	(Czech Republic) CZE	Petr Ševčík	26	0	15+3	0	2	0	4+2	0
24	MF	(Czech Republic) CZE	Petr Hronek	7	0	1+5	0	0+1	0	0	0
25	MF	(Slovakia) SVK	Jakub Hromada	22	1	14+5	1	1+2	0	0	0
26	FW	(Slovakia) SVK	Ivan Schranz	31	7	17+5	5	2	0	5+2	2
27	MF	(Ivory Coast) CIV	Ibrahim Traoré	24	2	7+5	1	1+1	0	6+4	1
28	GK	(Czech Republic) CZE	Aleš Mandous	19	0	10	0	1	0	8	0
29	FW	(Czech Republic) CZE	Daniel Šmiga	2	0	0+2	0	0	0	0	0
30	DF	(Ukraine) UKR	Taras Kacharaba	30	1	16+3	1	2+1	0	8	0
32	MF	(Czech Republic) CZE	Ondřej Lingr	42	16	15+12	11	3+2	3	7+3	2
33	MF	(Czech Republic) CZE	David Jurásek	44	2	28+3	2	5	0	7+1	0
35	MF	(Czech Republic) CZE	Matěj Jurásek	31	7	8+13	6	3+2	1	1+4	0
36	MF	(Czech Republic) CZE	Marek Icha	3	1	1+2	1	0	0	0	0
41	DF	(Czech Republic) CZE	Ondřej Kričfaluši	8	0	0+6	0	0+1	0	0+1	0
Slavia Prague B Players:
	MF	(Czech Republic) CZE	Matouš Nikl	2	0	0+1	0	1	0	0	0
Players away from Slavia Prague on loan:
10	MF	(Serbia) SRB	Srđan Plavšić	1	0	0	0	0	0	0+1	0
14	FW	(Czech Republic) CZE	Daniel Fila	4	1	0+2	0	0	0	1+1	1
16	FW	(Nigeria) NGR	Moses Usor	27	6	4+11	4	1	0	6+5	2
29	MF	(Czech Republic) CZE	Matěj Valenta	2	0	0	0	0	0	1+1	0
Players who left Slavia Prague during the season:
5	MF	(Ivory Coast) CIV	Christ Tiéhi	26	2	6+7	1	1	0	10+2	1
20	MF	(Nigeria) NGR	Yira Sor	9	2	0+3	0	1	0	4+1	2

=== Goal scorers ===
Place	Position	Nation	Number	Name	HET liga	MOL Cup	Europa Conference League	Total
1	FW	(Czech Republic)	15	Václav Jurečka	20	3	2	25
2	FW	(Nigeria)	9	Peter Olayinka	11	2	4	17
2	MF	(Czech Republic)	32	Ondřej Lingr	11	3	2	16
4	FW	(Czech Republic)	11	Stanislav Tecl	11	1	0	12
5	MF	(Czech Republic)	35	Matěj Jurásek	6	1	0	7
5	MF	(Czech Republic)	21	David Douděra	5	2	0	7
5	FW	(Slovakia)	26	Ivan Schranz	5	0	2	7
5				Own goal	4	1	2	7
9	FW	(Nigeria)	16	Moses Usor	4	0	2	6
11	FW	(Netherlands)	14	Mick van Buren	5	0	0	5
11	MF	(Brazil)	22	Ewerton	2	1	2	5
12	MF	(Czech Republic)	8	Lukáš Masopust	2	1	1	4
13	MF	(Czech Republic)	33	David Jurásek	2	0	0	2
13	MF	(Czech Republic)	17	Lukáš Provod	2	0	0	2
13	MF	(Ivory Coast)	27	Ibrahim Traoré	1	0	1	2
13	MF	(Ivory Coast)	5	Christ Tiéhi	1	0	1	2
13	FW	(Nigeria)	20	Yira Sor	0	0	2	2
19	MF	(Czech Republic)	36	Marek Icha	1	0	0	1
19	DF	(Ukraine)	30	Taras Kacharaba	1	0	0	1
19	DF	(Sweden)	4	Aiham Ousou	1	0	0	1
19	MF	(Slovakia)	25	Jakub Hromada	1	0	0	1
19	MF	(Norway)	10	Christos Zafeiris	1	0	0	1
19	DF	(Nigeria)	5	Igoh Ogbu	1	0	0	1
19	FW	(Czech Republic)	14	Daniel Fila	0	0	1	1
19	DF	(Czech Republic)	3	Tomáš Holeš	0	0	1	1
				TOTALS	98	15	23	136

=== Clean sheets ===
Place	Position	Nation	Number	Name	HET liga	MOL Cup	Europa Conference League	Total
1	GK	(Czech Republic)	1	Ondřej Kolář	10	3	1	14
2	GK	(Czech Republic)	28	Aleš Mandous	4	1	4	9
				TOTALS	14	4	5	23

=== Disciplinary record ===
Number	Nation	Position	Name	HET liga		MOL Cup		Europa Conference League		Total	
Number	Nation	Position	Name	Booked	Sent off (straight red)	Booked	Sent off (straight red)	Booked	Sent off (straight red)	Booked	Sent off (straight red)
1	(Czech Republic)	GK	Ondřej Kolář	1	0	0	0	0	0	1	0
3	(Czech Republic)	DF	Tomáš Holeš	2	0	0	0	0	0	2	0
4	(Sweden)	DF	Aiham Ousou	3	2	0	0	2	0	5	2
5	(Nigeria)	DF	Igoh Ogbu	3	0	0	0	0	0	3	0
8	(Czech Republic)	MF	Lukáš Masopust	3	0	0	0	2	0	5	0
9	(Nigeria)	FW	Peter Olayinka	2	1	0	0	2	0	4	1
10	(Norway)	MF	Christos Zafeiris	3	0	0	0	0	0	3	0
12	(Brazil)	DF	Eduardo Santos	2	1	0	0	0	1	2	2
14	(Netherlands)	FW	Mick van Buren	0	0	2	0	0	0	2	0
15	(Czech Republic)	FW	Václav Jurečka	1	0	0	0	0	0	1	0
17	(Czech Republic)	MF	Lukáš Provod	2	0	0	0	1	0	3	0
19	(Liberia)	DF	Oscar Dorley	2	1	1	0	3	0	6	1
20	(Czech Republic)	MF	David Pech	1	0	0	0	0	0	1	0
21	(Czech Republic)	MF	David Douděra	3	0	2	0	1	0	6	0
22	(Brazil)	MF	Ewerton	1	0	0	0	0	0	1	0
23	(Czech Republic)	MF	Petr Ševčík	0	0	0	0	1	0	1	0
24	(Czech Republic)	MF	Petr Hronek	1	0	0	0	0	0	1	0
26	(Slovakia)	FW	Ivan Schranz	5	0	0	0	4	0	9	0
27	(Ivory Coast)	MF	Ibrahim Traoré	2	0	0	0	2	0	4	0
28	(Czech Republic)	GK	Aleš Mandous	1	0	0	0	2	0	3	0
30	(Ukraine)	DF	Taras Kacharaba	2	0	0	0	0	0	2	0
32	(Czech Republic)	MF	Ondřej Lingr	2	0	1	0	2	0	5	0
33	(Czech Republic)	MF	David Jurásek	0	0	1	0	2	0	3	0
35	(Czech Republic)	MF	Matěj Jurásek	2	0	1	0	1	0	4	0
Slavia Prague B Players:
Players away on loan:
16	(Nigeria)	FW	Moses Usor	3	0	0	0	3	0	6	0
Players who left Slavia Prague during the season:
5	(Ivory Coast)	MF	Christ Tiéhi	3	0	0	0	3	0	6	0
			TOTALS	51	5	8	0	30	1	89	6
