= Štěpán Chaloupek =

Czech footballer (born 2003)

Personal information
- Date of birth: 8 March 2003 (age 23)
- Place of birth: Meziboří, Czech Republic
- Height: 1.90 m (6 ft 3 in)
- Positions: Centre-back; defensive midfielder

Team information
- Current team: SK Slavia Prague
- Number: 2

Youth career
- 2009–2015: SFK Meziboří
- 2015–2021: Teplice

Senior career*
Years	Team	Apps	(Gls)
2022–2024	Teplice	59	(3)
2024–	Slavia Prague	56	(10)
2024–2025	Slavia Prague B	6	(0)

International career^{‡}
2023–2025	Czech Republic U21	13	(0)
2025–	Czech Republic	9	(0)
- * Club domestic league appearances and goals as of 9 November 2026 ‡ National team caps and goals as of 3 October 2026

Štěpán Chaloupek (born 8 March 2003) is a Czech professional footballer who plays as a defender for Slavia Prague and the Czech Republic national team.

== Life ==
Chaloupek was born in Meziboří.

== Club career ==
Chaloupek started with football in his hometown Meziboří. He was then raised in Teplice, where he was captain of the under-19 team.

He made his debut in senior football in the 2021–22 season of the Czech Cup in August 2021. In the Czech First League, he debuted for Teplice in November 2021, in their 4–2 away loss against Sparta Prague. In the 2022–23 season, he became a stable member of the starting line-up.

In January 2024, it was announced that Chaloupek signed a four-year contract with Slavia Prague, effective from 30 June 2024. After the 2023–24 season, Chaloupek won the award for Teplice's best player of the season.

== International career ==
Chaloupek played for the Czech Republic U21 team. In the 2025 UEFA European Under-21 Championship qualification, he played almost all of the matches in the starting line-up, helping the team to qualify for 2025 UEFA Euro U21.

In November 2025, Chaloupek debuted for the senior Czech Republic national team in a match against Gibraltar.

On 31 May 2026, Chaloupek was selected in the 26-man squad for the 2026 FIFA World Cup.

== Style of play ==
Among his strengths are one-on-one duels, head play and constructive passing.

== Career statistics ==
=== Club ===
As of match played 31 October 2026

Appearances and goals by club, season and competition
Club	Season	League			Czech Cup		Europe		Other		Total	
Club	Season	Division	Apps	Goals	Apps	Goals	Apps	Goals	Apps	Goals	Apps	Goals
Teplice	2021–22	Czech First League	8	0	1	0	—		0	0	9	0
Teplice	2022–23	Czech First League	20	0	0	0	—		—		20	0
Teplice	2023–24	Czech First League	31	3	2	0	—		—		33	3
Teplice	Total		59	3	3	0	—		0	0	62	3
Slavia Prague	2024–25	Czech First League	17	0	2	0	3 (Note: Appearances in UEFA Europa League)	0	—		22	0
Slavia Prague	2025–26	Czech First League	28	8	2	0	8 (Note: Appearances in UEFA Champions League)	1	—		38	9
Slavia Prague	2026–27	Czech First League	10	1	0	0	1	0	—		11	1
Slavia Prague	Total		55	9	4	0	12	1	—		71	10
Slavia Prague B	2024–25	Czech National Football League	5	0	—		—		—		5	0
Slavia Prague B	2025–26	Czech National Football League	1	0	—		—		—		1	0
Slavia Prague B	Total		6	0	—		—		—		6	0
Career total			120	12	7	0	12	1	0	0	140	13

=== International ===
As of match played 3 October 2026

Appearances and goals by national team and year
National team	Year	Apps	Goals
Czech Republic	2025	1	0
Czech Republic	2026	8	0
Total		9	0

== Honours ==
Slavia Prague

- Czech First League: 2024–25, 2025–26
