= David Pech =

Czech footballer

Personal information
- Date of birth: 22 February 2002 (age 24)
- Place of birth: Brandýs nad Labem-Stará Boleslav, Czech Republic
- Height: 1.77 m (5 ft 10 in)
- Position: Midfielder

Team information
- Current team: Mladá Boleslav
- Number: 77

Youth career
- 2013–2018: Mladá Boleslav

Senior career*
Years	Team	Apps	(Gls)
2019–2023	Mladá Boleslav	36	(2)
2023–2025	Slavia Prague	7	(0)
2023–2025	→→ Slavia Prague B	33	(6)
2024	→ Dukla Prague (loan)	5	(0)
2025–	Mladá Boleslav	17	(2)

International career
2017–2018	Czech Republic U16	4	(0)
2018–2019	Czech Republic U17	13	(4)
2019	Czech Republic U19	5	(0)
2022	Czech Republic U20	2	(0)
2022–2023	Czech Republic U21	6	(0)
- * Club domestic league appearances and goals as of 27 May 2026

David Pech (born 22 February 2002) is a Czech footballer who plays as a midfielder for FK Mladá Boleslav.

== Career statistics ==
=== Club ===
As of 27 May 2023

Club	Season	League			Cup		Continental		Other		Total	
Club	Season	Division	Apps	Goals	Apps	Goals	Apps	Goals	Apps	Goals	Apps	Goals
Mladá Boleslav	2019–20	Czech First League	5	0	1	0	0	0	—		6	0
Mladá Boleslav	2020–21	Czech First League	2	0	0	0	—		—		2	0
Mladá Boleslav	2021–22	Czech First League	13	1	2	0	—		—		15	1
Mladá Boleslav	2022–23	Czech First League	16	1	2	0	—		—		18	1
Mladá Boleslav	Total		36	2	5	0	0	0	—		41	2
Slavia Prague	2022–23	Czech First League	7	0	1	0	—		—		8	0
Career total			43	2	6	0	0	0	0	0	49	2
