= 2023–24 FK Teplice season =

FK Teplice
2023–24 season
- Manager: Zdenko Frťala
- Czech First League: Ongoing
- Czech Cup: Third round
- All statistics correct as of August 2023.

The 2023–24 season is FK Teplice's 79th season in existence and 28th consecutive in the Czech First League. They will also compete in the Czech Cup.

== Players ==
=== First-team squad ===
As of 7 September 2023.

Note: Flags indicate national team as defined under FIFA eligibility rules; some limited exceptions apply. Players may hold more than one non-FIFA nationality.

No.	Pos.	Nation	Player
1	GK	CZE	Luděk Němeček
3	DF	SRB	Nemanja Krsmanović
4	DF	CZE	Štěpán Chaloupek
6	MF	CZE	Michal Bílek
7	FW	CZE	Daniel Fila (on loan from Slavia Prague)
11	MF	CZE	Filip Havelka
12	FW	EGY	Mohamed Yasser (on loan from Al Ahly)
14	FW	CZE	Tadeáš Vachoušek
15	MF	CZE	Petr Hronek (on loan from Slavia Prague)
16	MF	UKR	Yehor Tsykalo
17	DF	NOR	Andreas Vindheim (on loan from Sparta Prague)
18	DF	SRB	Nemanja Mićević
19	MF	CZE	Robert Jukl
20	MF	CZE	Daniel Trubač

No.	Pos.	Nation	Player
21	DF	CZE	Jakub Křišťan
22	DF	CZE	Jakub Hora
23	MF	CZE	Lukáš Mareček
25	FW	SEN	Abdallah Gning
26	MF	CZE	Jakub Urbanec
28	DF	CZE	Jan Knapík
30	GK	CZE	Tomáš Grigar
35	MF	CZE	Matěj Radosta
44	DF	FRA	Soufiane Dramé
46	MF	CZE	Marek Beránek
47	FW	CZE	Michal Trnovec
48	MF	CZE	Jonáš Bzura
72	GK	CZE	Filip Mucha
—	DF	CZE	Albert Labík (on loan from Slavia Prague)

=== Out on loan ===
Note: Flags indicate national team as defined under FIFA eligibility rules; some limited exceptions apply. Players may hold more than one non-FIFA nationality.

No.	Pos.	Nation	Player
—	MF	ZAM	Ngosa Sunzu (at Příbram)
—	FW	SVK	Roman Čerepkai (at Zlaté Moravce)

No.	Pos.	Nation	Player
—	DF	CZE	Josef Švanda (at Varnsdorf)

== Transfers ==
=== In ===
Pos.	Player	Transferred from	Fee	Date	Source

=== Out ===
Pos.	Player	Transferred to	Fee	Date	Source

== Pre-season and friendlies ==
Win Draw Loss Fixtures

== Competitions ==
=== Overall record ===
Competition	First match	Last match	Starting round	Final position	Record							
Competition	First match	Last match	Starting round	Final position	Pld	W	D	L	GF	GA	GD	Win %
Czech First League	23 July 2023	27 April 2024	Matchday 1		30	9	9	12	31	40	−9	30.00
Czech Cup	30 August 2023	27 September 2023	Second round	Third round	2	1	0	1	4	4	+0	50.00
Total					32	10	9	13	35	44	−9	31.25

Last updated: 5 May 2024
Source: Soccerway

=== Czech First League ===
==== League table ====
Pos	Team	Pld	W	D	L	GF	GA	GD	Pts	Qualification or relegation
8	Sigma Olomouc	30	10	7	13	40	45	−5	37	Qualification for the Play-off
9	Hradec Králové	30	9	10	11	32	38	−6	37	Qualification for the Play-off
10	Teplice	30	9	9	12	31	40	−9	36	Qualification for the Play-off
11	Bohemians 1905	30	8	11	11	29	40	−11	35	Qualification for the Relegation group
12	Jablonec	30	6	12	12	35	45	−10	30	Qualification for the Relegation group

Source: Fortuna Liga
Rules for classification: 1) Points; 2) Head-to-head points; 3) Head-to-head goal difference; 4) Head-to-head goals scored; 5) Goal difference; 6) Goals scored; 7) Fair-play ranking; 8) Draw.

==== Results summary ====
Overall								Home						Away					
Pld	W	D	L	GF	GA	GD	Pts	W	D	L	GF	GA	GD	W	D	L	GF	GA	GD
30	9	9	12	31	40	−9	36	5	7	3	15	11	+4	4	2	9	16	29	−13

==== Results by round ====
Round	1	2	3	4	5	6	7	8	9	10	11	12	13	14	15	16	17	18	19	20	21	22	23	24	25	26	27	28	29	30
Ground	H	A	H	A	H	A	H	A	A	H	A	H	A	H	A	H	A	H	A	H	A	H	H	A	H	A	H	A	H	A
Result	W	W	D	L	D	L	L	W	D	D	L	L	L	W	W	D	L	W	L	W	D	D	W	L	D	L	L	W	D	L
Position	7	3	4	7	8	9	8	8	9	8	9	10	11	10	9	10	10	9	9	9	9	9	7	9	8	9	10	10	10	10

A = Away; H = Home; W = Win; D = Draw; L = Loss

==== Matches ====
The league fixtures were unveiled on 21 June 2023.
