= Meziboří =

- Town
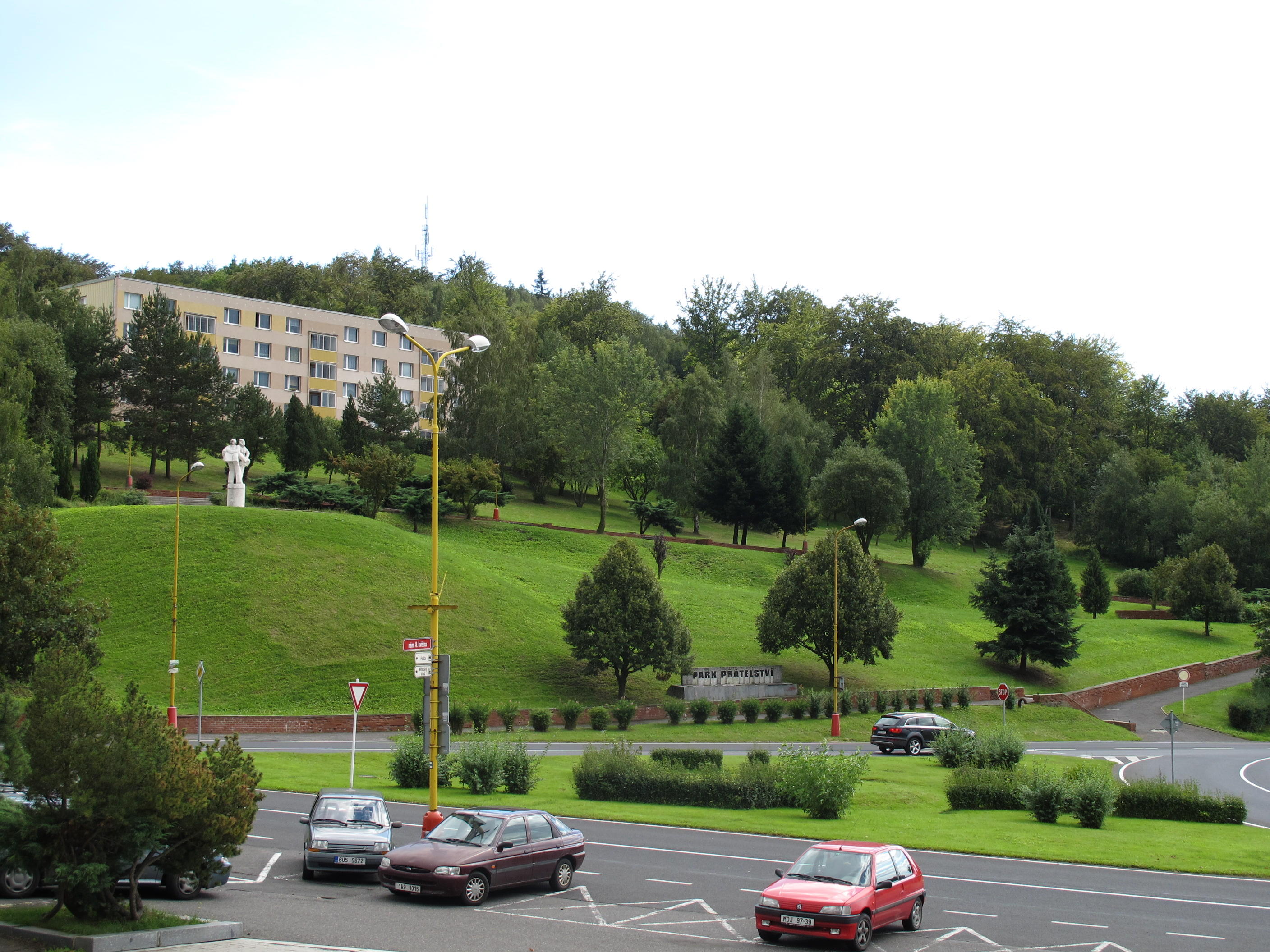
- A park in Meziboří

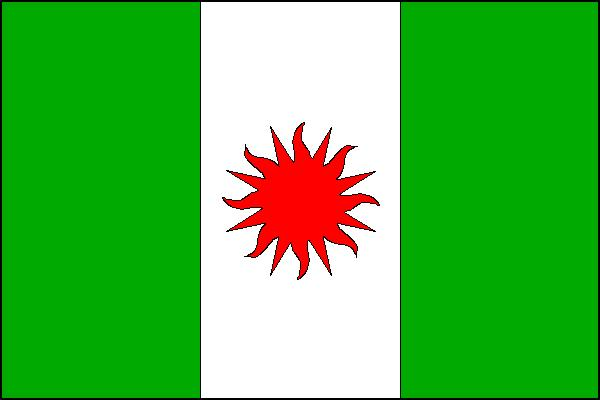
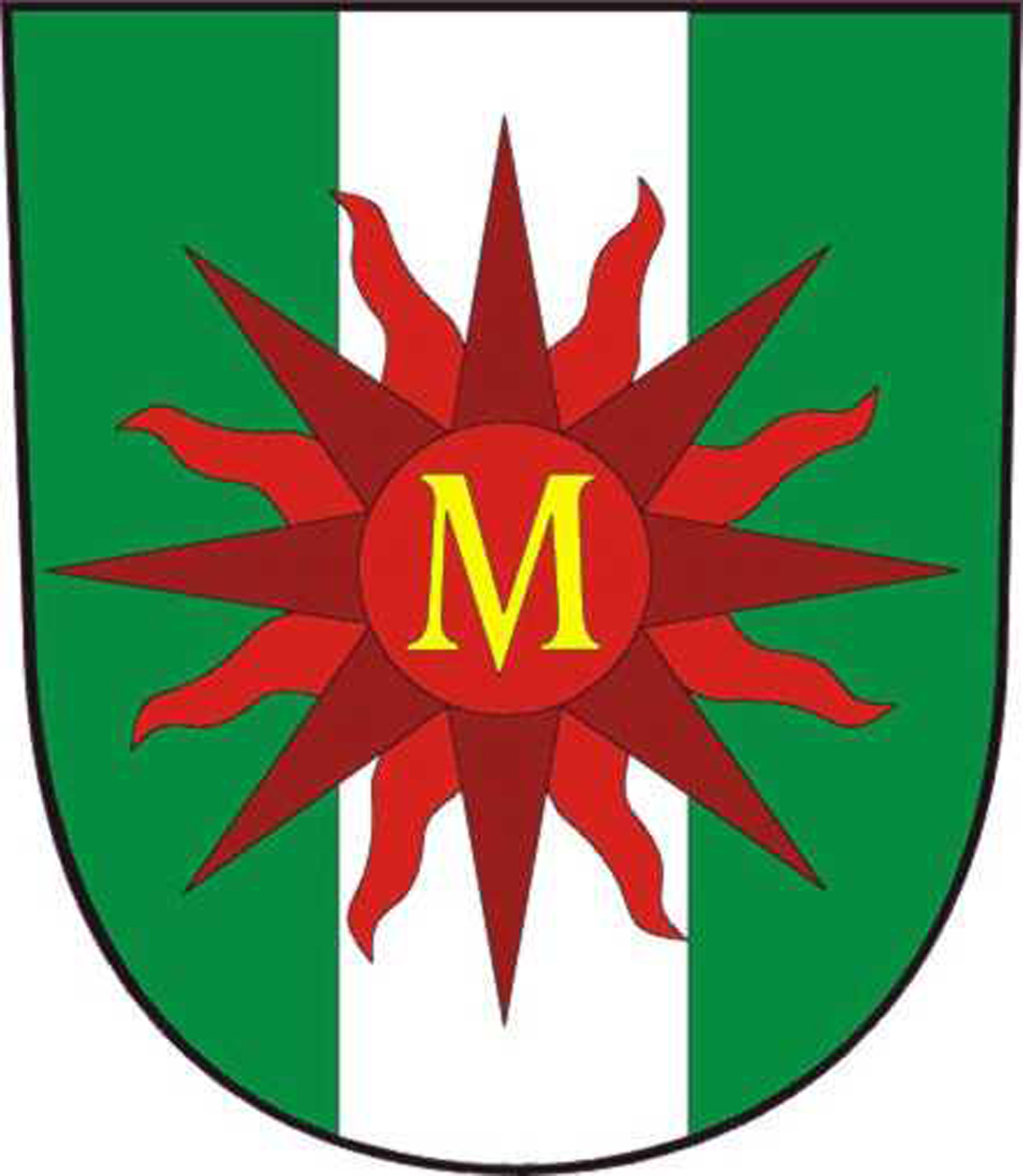
- Flag Coat of arms

- Location in the Czech Republic
- Coordinates: 50°37′22″N 13°36′7″E
- Country: Czech Republic
- Region: Ústí nad Labem
- District: Most
- First mentioned: 1398

Government
  - Mayor: Petr Červenka

Area
  - Total: 14.36 km^{2} (5.54 sq mi)
- Elevation: 512 m (1,680 ft)

Population (2026-01-01)
  - Total: 4,526
  - Density: 315.2/km^{2} (816.3/sq mi)
- Time zone: UTC+1 (CET)
  - Summer (DST): UTC+2 (CEST)
- Postal code: 435 13
- Website: www.mezibori.cz

Meziboří (Czech pronunciation: [ˈmɛzɪbor̝iː]; until 1957 Šenbach; German: Schönbach) is a town in Most District in the Ústí nad Labem Region of the Czech Republic. It has about 4,500 inhabitants. The town is located in the Ore Mountains. Meziboří was originally a small village, expanded in the 1950s to a town.

== Etymology ==
The initial German name Schönbach means 'beautiful stream'. The German name was Czechised as Šenbach. The modern name Meziboří means "the area between pine forests".

== Geography ==
Meziboří is located about 12 kilometres (7 mi) north of Most. The entire municipal territory lies in the Ore Mountains. The highest point is the mountain Černý vrch at 889 m (2,917 ft) above sea level.

== History ==
The first written mention of Šenbach is from 1398. For centuries, the inhabitants have subsisted on agriculture, especially the cultivation of rye, oats, potatoes, cattle grazing and forestry. It remained so even at the beginning of industrialisation in the second half of the 19th century. The number of inhabitants in the surrounding villages, which depended on coal mining, increased, but in Šenbach the population did not change. Fields on mountain slopes surrounded by forests on all sides could not feed more people.

The development of Šenbach was determined by an organised recruitment program for apprentices for heavy industries, announced in 1949 by President Klement Gottwald. In September 1950, the first dormitory for 360 mining apprentices was opened, and in January 1951, a dormitory was opened for another 360 apprentices at the chemical school. In 1952, a girls' apprentice dormitory for miners and excavators was opened. At that time, the town's population reached two thousand. Between 1953 and 1968, a housing estate with fifteen hundred flats was being built. Most of the houses of the old village was demolished and only 11 are preserved to this day. In 1957, the town was renamed Meziboří.

== Demographics ==
Historical population

Year	Pop.	±%
1869	219	—
1880	232	+5.9%
1890	288	+24.1%
1900	304	+5.6%
1910	302	−0.7%

Year	Pop.	±%
1921	298	−1.3%
1930	308	+3.4%
1950	235	−23.7%
1961	2,904	+1135.7%
1970	6,210	+113.8%

Year	Pop.	±%
1980	5,588	−10.0%
1991	5,158	−7.7%
2001	4,969	−3.7%
2011	4,703	−5.4%
2021	4,669	−0.7%

Source: Censuses

== Transport ==
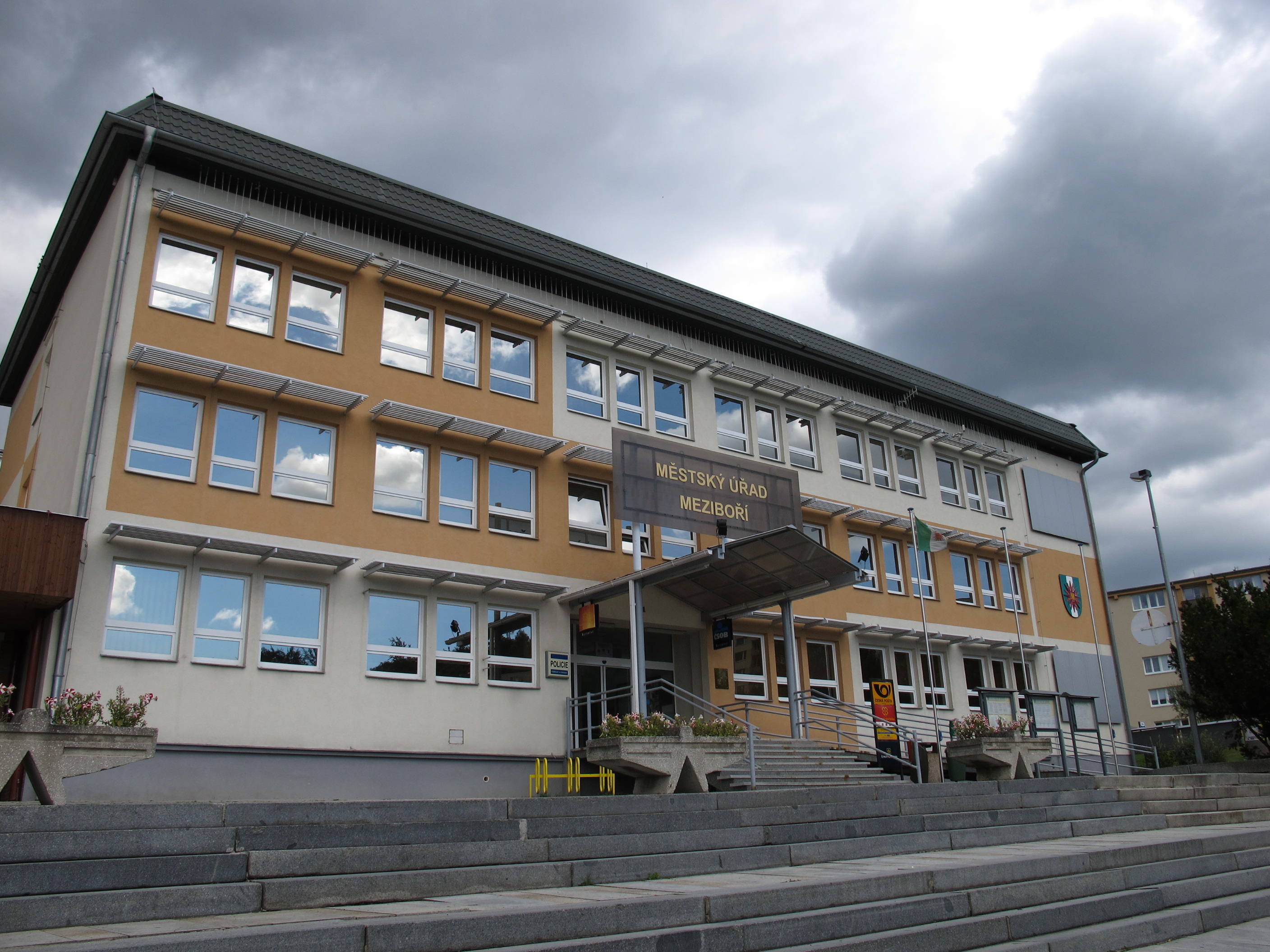
Town hall

There are no railways or major roads passing through the municipal territory. A local road connects the town with Litvínov.

== Sport ==
In Meziboří is a ski resort, operated by the town.

== Sights ==
There are no protected cultural monuments in the town.

== Notable people ==
- Štěpán Chaloupek (born 2003), footballer

== Twin towns – sister cities ==
Meziboří is twinned with:

- Sayda, Germany
- Sogliano al Rubicone, Italy
