= David Douděra =

Czech footballer (born 1998)

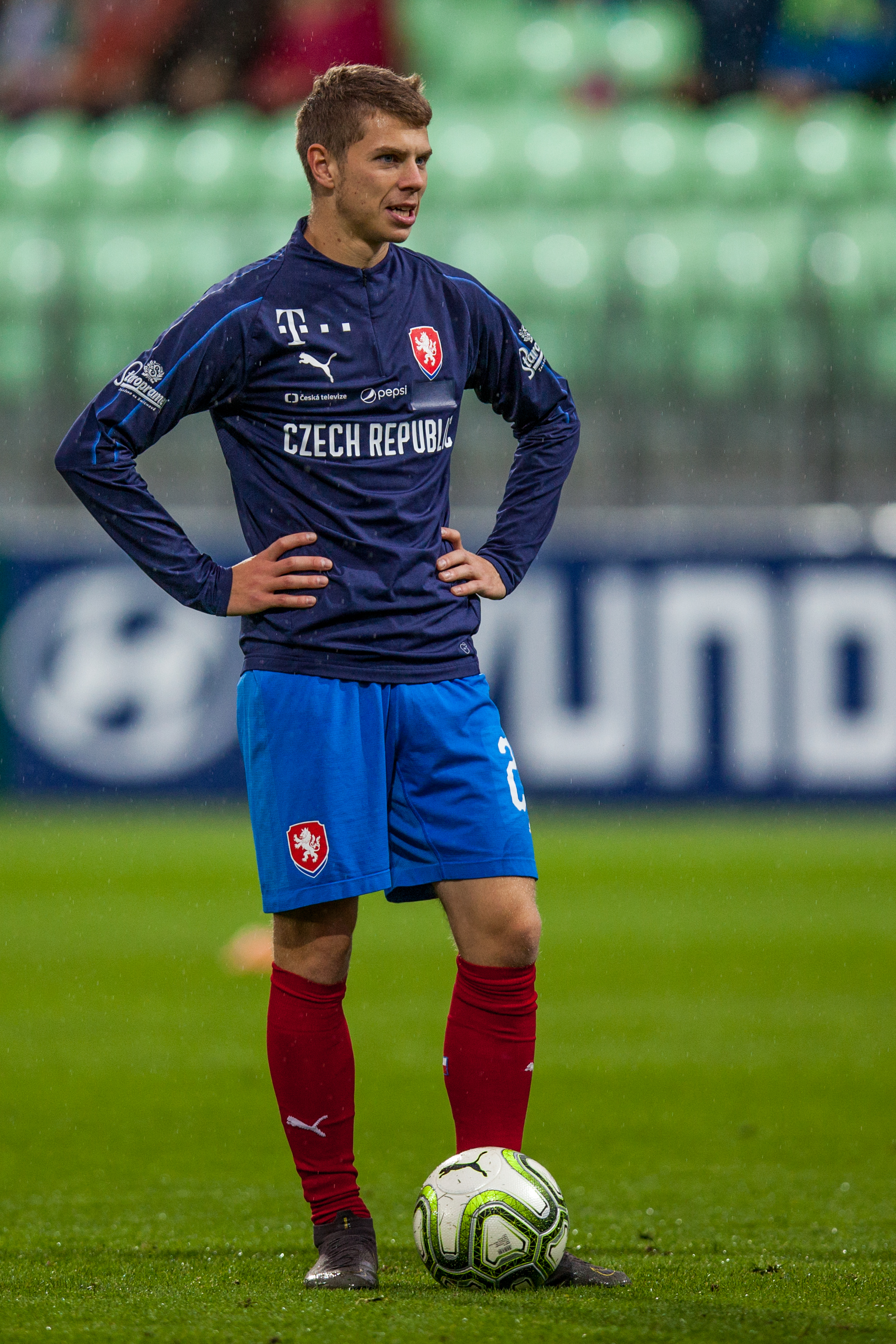
- Douděra with Czech Republic U21 in 2019

Personal information
- Date of birth: 31 May 1998 (age 28)
- Place of birth: Brandýs nad Labem-Stará Boleslav, Czech Republic
- Height: 1.75 m (5 ft 9 in)
- Position: Right midfielder

Team information
- Current team: FC Cincinnati
- Number: 23

Youth career
- –2007: SC Xaverov
- 2007–2011: Viktoria Žižkov
- 2011–2014: Meteor Prague
- 2014–2017: Dukla Prague

Senior career*
Years	Team	Apps	(Gls)
2017–2019	Dukla Prague	51	(2)
2020–2022	Mladá Boleslav	76	(12)
2022–2026	Slavia Prague	107	(8)
2026–	FC Cincinnati	4	(1)

International career^{‡}
2018	Czech Republic U20	4	(0)
2019	Czech Republic U21	4	(0)
2023–	Czech Republic	18	(2)
- * Club domestic league appearances and goals as of 14:54, 22 October 2026 (UTC) ‡ National team caps and goals as of 08:20, 25 June 2026 (UTC)

David Douděra (born 31 May 1998) is a Czech professional footballer who plays as a right midfielder for Major League Soccer club FC Cincinnati and the Czech Republic national team.

== Club career ==
=== Dukla Prague ===
Douděra joined FK Dukla Prague at the age of 15. After good appearances for Dukla Prague's B-team, he got his official debut for the club in a Czech First League against Sigma Olomouc on 29 September 2017. Douděra started on the bench, but replaced Róbert Kovaľ in the 62nd minute. He played 10 games further in the 2017–18 season, five as a starter and the rest from the bench. In the following season, Douděra became a regular starter with 30 league appearances; 21 of them as a starter. However, Dukla was relegated to the Czech National Football League for the 2019–20 season.

=== Mladá Boleslav ===
In the winter break of the 2019–20 season, Douděra transferred from Dukla to Mladá Boleslav. He debuted for the team on 14 February 2020 against Dynamo České Budějovice. In the 2021–22 Czech First League, Douděra scored 10 goals and registered 4 assists for Boleslav in 31 matches.

=== Slavia Prague ===
Following the end of the 2021–22 Czech First League, Douděra became the first summer signing for Slavia Prague. He made his competitive debut for the club in a 4–0 away win against Gibraltarian side St Joseph's in the second qualifying round of the 2022–23 UEFA Europa Conference League. On 9 May 2026 in the Prague derby, Douděra received a red card after he shouted at referee Karel Rouček "Dejte třetí poločas, vy zmrdi!" (lit. 'Give a third half, you motherfuckers!'). Slavia chairman Jaroslav Tvrdík said that Douděra had been immediately removed from the first team and would not play for Slavia again. Douděra later apologized for his behavior. On 14 May 2026, Douděra was banned by the LFA Disciplinary commission for three matches.

=== FC Cincinnati ===
On 2 September 2026, Douděra signed a contract with Major League Soccer club FC Cincinnati until the end of the 2027/28 season with an option for another season.

== International career ==
Douděra represented the Czech Republic at under-20 and under-21 level. In March 2023, he received his first call-up to the Czech senior squad for UEFA Euro 2024 qualifying Group E matches against Poland and Moldova. Douděra scored his first goal for the national team in November 2023 in a 3–0 victory against the latter opponent, where he also debuted.

On 31 May 2026, Douděra was selected in the 26-man squad for the 2026 FIFA World Cup.

== Career statistics ==
=== Club ===
As of match played 21 October 2026

Appearances and goals by club, season and competition
Club	Season	League			National cup (Note: Includes Czech Cup)		Continental		Other		Total	
Club	Season	Division	Apps	Goals	Apps	Goals	Apps	Goals	Apps	Goals	Apps	Goals
Dukla Prague	2017–18	Czech First League	11	0	—		—		—		11	0
Dukla Prague	2018–19	Czech First League	30	2	—		—		—		30	2
Dukla Prague	2019–20	Czech National Football League	10	0	2	2	—		—		12	2
Dukla Prague	Total		51	2	2	2	—		—		53	4
Mladá Boleslav	2019–20	Czech First League	14	0	1	0	—		—		15	0
Mladá Boleslav	2020–21	Czech First League	31	2	4	0	—		—		35	2
Mladá Boleslav	2021–22	Czech First League	31	10	4	0	—		—		35	10
Mladá Boleslav	Total		76	12	9	0	—		—		85	12
Slavia Prague	2022–23	Czech First League	29	5	5	2	10 (Note: Appearances in UEFA Europa Conference League)	0	—		44	7
Slavia Prague	2023–24	Czech First League	25	0	3	0	11 (Note: Appearances in UEFA Europa League)	3	—		39	3
Slavia Prague	2024–25	Czech First League	31	2	2	0	8 (Note: Three appearances in UEFA Champions League, five appearances in UEFA Europa League)	0	—		41	2
Slavia Prague	2025–26	Czech First League	22	1	—		7 (Note: Appearances in UEFA Champions League)	0	—		29	1
Slavia Prague	Total		107	8	10	2	36	3	—		153	13
FC Cincinnati	2026	MLS	4	1	—		—		—		4	1
Career total			238	23	21	4	36	3	—		295	30

=== International ===
As of match played 24 June 2026

Appearances and goals by national team and year
National team	Year	Apps	Goals
Czech Republic	2023	6	1
Czech Republic	2024	4	0
Czech Republic	2025	5	1
Czech Republic	2026	3	0
Total		18	2

Scores and results list the Czech Republic's goal tally first, score column indicates score after each Douděra goal.

List of international goals scored by David Douděra
No.	Date	Venue	Opponent	Score	Result	Competition
1	20 November 2023	Andrův stadion, Olomouc, Czech Republic	Moldova	1–0	3–0	UEFA Euro 2024 qualifying
2	17 November 2025	Andrův stadion, Olomouc, Czech Republic	Gibraltar	1–0	6–0	2026 FIFA World Cup qualification

== Honours ==
Slavia Prague

- Czech First League: 2024–25, 2025–26
- Czech Cup: 2022–23
