= Ondřej Lingr =

Czech footballer (born 1998)

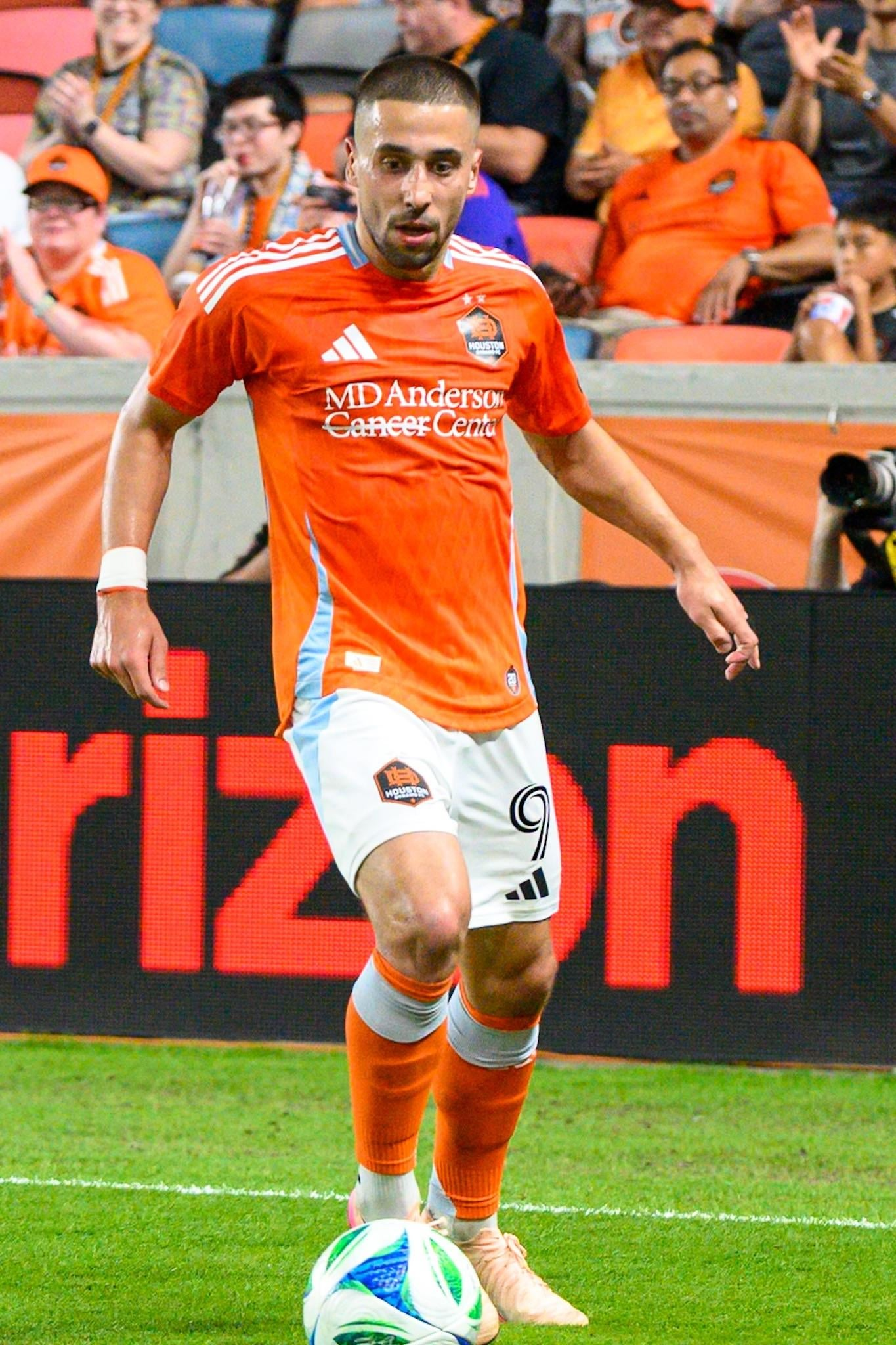
- Lingr with Houston Dynamo in 2025

Personal information
- Date of birth: 7 October 1998 (age 28)
- Place of birth: Havířov, Czech Republic
- Height: 1.75 m (5 ft 9 in)
- Position: Attacking midfielder

Team information
- Current team: Korona Kielce
- Number: 32

Youth career
- –2017: Karviná

Senior career*
Years	Team	Apps	(Gls)
2017–2020	Karviná	74	(9)
2020–2024	Slavia Prague	88	(30)
2023–2024	→ Feyenoord (loan)	20	(3)
2024	Feyenoord	0	(0)
2024–2025	Slavia Prague	16	(1)
2025–2026	Houston Dynamo	43	(3)
2026–	Korona Kielce	6	(1)

International career^{‡}
2014–2015	Czech Republic U17	10	(1)
2016–2017	Czech Republic U19	12	(2)
2017–2018	Czech Republic U20	4	(0)
2019–2021	Czech Republic U21	7	(0)
2022–	Czech Republic	28	(1)
- * Club domestic league appearances and goals as of 10:05, 19 October 2026 (UTC) ‡ National team caps and goals as of 09:22, 7 October 2026 (UTC)

Ondřej Lingr (born 7 October 1998) is a Czech professional footballer who plays as an attacking midfielder for Ekstraklasa club Korona Kielce and the Czech Republic national team.

== Club career ==
On 12 May 2017, Lingr made his Czech First League debut for Karviná in a match against Sparta Prague. On 6 August 2020, Lingr joined Slavia Prague for an estimated amount of €450,000, signing a contract until summer 2024. By scoring a late goal in the Prague derby against Sparta Prague and helping with the decisive in the victory over České Budějovice, he received 2021–22 Czech First League Player of the Month 30 March 2022.

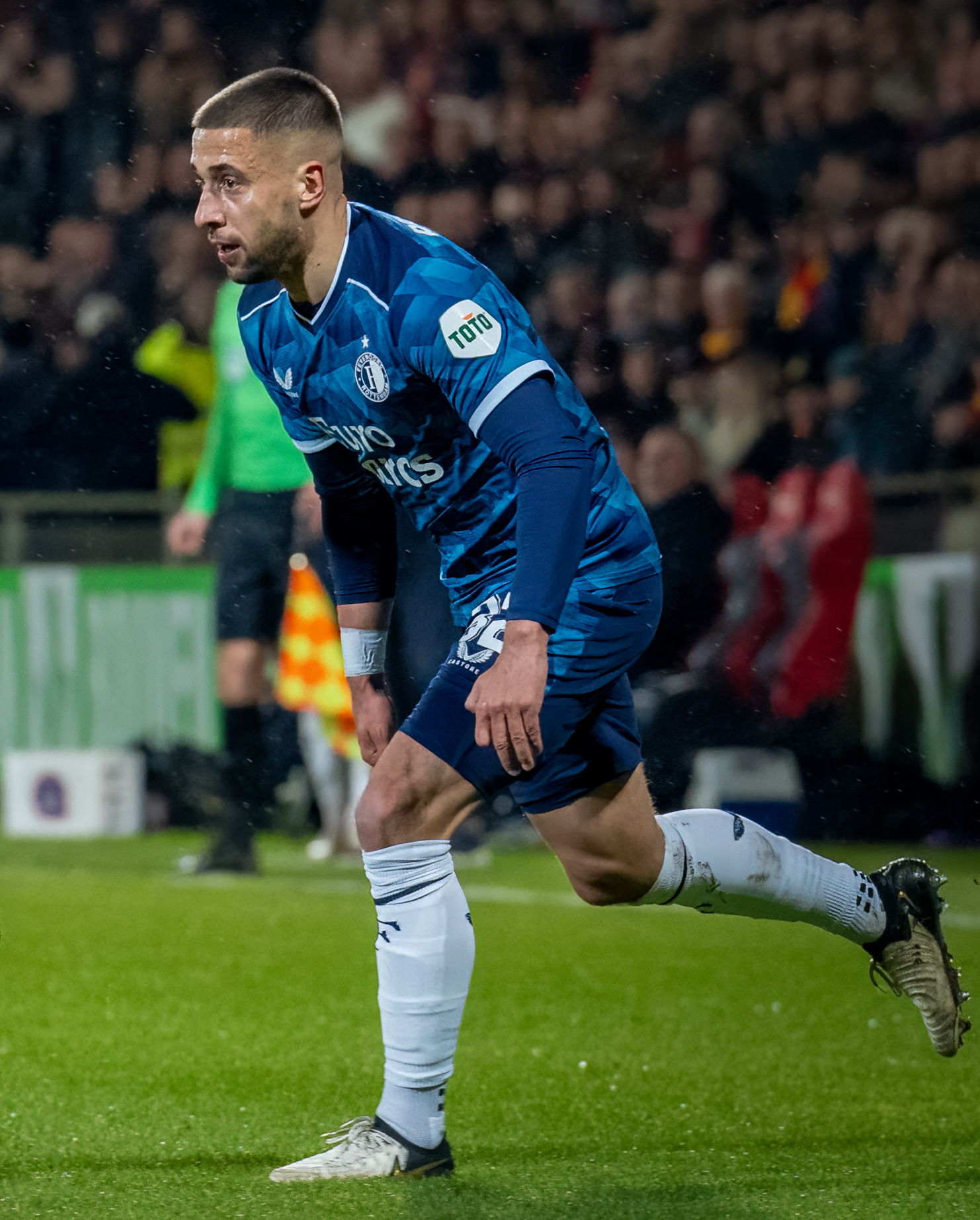
Lingr playing for Feyenoord in 2024.

On 24 August 2023, Lingr joined Dutch Eredivisie club Feyenoord on one-year loan with an option to buy. He debuted against FC Utrecht the same year on 3 September, coming off as a substitute in the 85th minute and immediately contributed to a 5–1 victory with an assist.

On 3 September 2024, Lingr returned to Slavia Prague, signed a contract until June 2028. On 28 March 2025, he joined Major League Soccer side Houston Dynamo on a four-year contract for a reported fee of $2.6 million. On 19 April 2025, he came in as a sub and scored his first goal for the club in the 96th minute of a match against Colorado Rapids.

On 30 August 2026, Lingr signed a contract with Ekstraklasa club Korona Kielce until 30 June 2029.

== International career ==
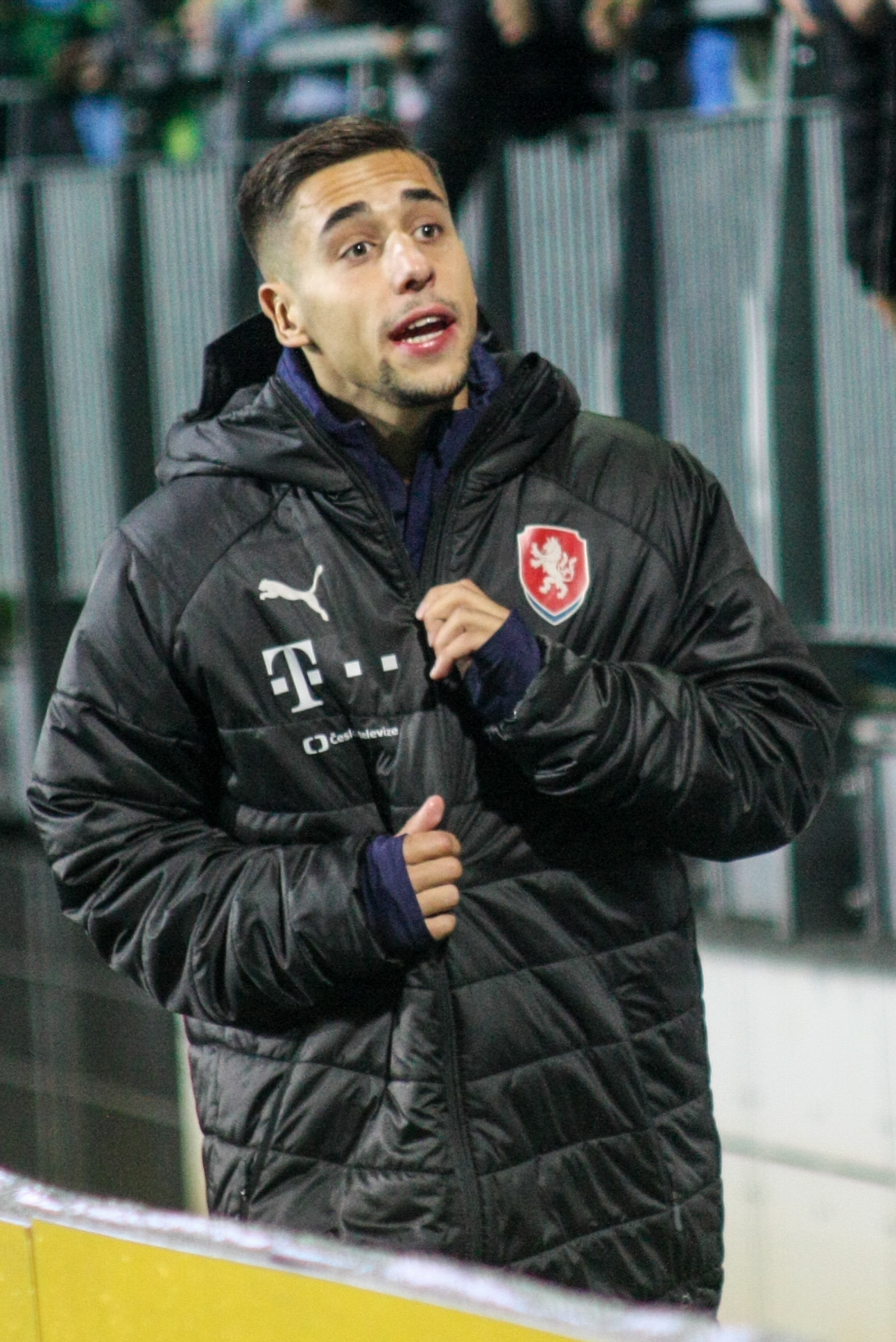
Lingr with the Czech Republic U21 in 2019

After Patrik Schick suffered an injury in early 2022, Lingr was one of the players that received his first senior call-up for the 2022 FIFA World Cup play-off against Sweden and a friendly match against Wales. Lingr made his debut against the former opponent, coming off a substitute. Lingr was selected from the list of 26 Czech footballers by Ivan Hašek to participate in UEFA Euro 2024.

== Career statistics ==
=== Club ===
As of match played 18 October 2026

Appearances and goals by club, season and competition
Club	Season	League			National cup (Note: Includes Czech Cup, KNVB Cup, U.S. Open Cup, Polish Cup)		Continental		Other		Total	
Club	Season	Division	Apps	Goals	Apps	Goals	Apps	Goals	Apps	Goals	Apps	Goals
Karviná	2016–17	Czech First League	2	0	—		—		—		2	0
Karviná	2017–18	Czech First League	14	0	3	3	—		—		17	3
Karviná	2018–19	Czech First League	29	2	3	0	—		—		32	2
Karviná	2019–20	Czech First League	29	7	0	0	—		—		29	7
Karviná	Total		74	9	6	3	—		—		80	12
Slavia Prague	2020–21	Czech First League	27	4	5	3	12 (Note: Appearances in UEFA Europa League)	1	—		44	8
Slavia Prague	2021–22	Czech First League	31	14	3	0	14 (Note: One appearances in UEFA Champions League, two appearances in UEFA Europa League, eleven appearances and one goal in UEFA Europa Conference League)	1	—		48	15
Slavia Prague	2022–23	Czech First League	27	11	5	3	10 (Note: Appearances in UEFA Europa Conference League)	2	—		42	16
Slavia Prague	2023–24	Czech First League	3	1	0	0	1 (Note: Appearances in UEFA Europa League)	0	—		4	1
Slavia Prague	Total		88	30	13	6	37	4	—		138	40
Feyenoord (loan)	2023–24	Eredivisie	20	3	2	1	5 (Note: Four appearances in UEFA Champions League, one appearance in UEFA Europa League)	0	—		27	4
Feyenoord	2024–25	Eredivisie	0	0	0	0	0	0	1 (Note: Appearance in Johan Cruyff Shield)	0	1	0
Slavia Prague	2024–25	Czech First League	16	1	1	0	7	0	—		24	1
Houston Dynamo	2025	Major League Soccer	26	3	2	0	—		2 (Note: Appearances in Leagues Cup)	1	30	4
Houston Dynamo	2026	Major League Soccer	17	0	3	1	—		—		20	1
Houston Dynamo	Total		43	3	5	1	—		2	1	50	5
Korona Kielce	2026–27	Ekstraklasa	6	1	1	0	—		—		7	1
Career total			247	47	28	11	49	4	3	1	327	63

=== International ===
As of match played 6 October 2026

Appearances and goals by national team and year
National team	Year	Apps	Goals
Czech Republic	2022	5	0
Czech Republic	2023	6	0
Czech Republic	2024	13	1
Czech Republic	2025	1	0
Czech Republic	2026	3	0
Total		28	1

Scores and results list Czech Republic's goal tally first, score column indicates score after each Lingr goal.

List of international goals scored by Ondřej Lingr
No.	Date	Venue	Opponent	Score	Result	Competition
1	7 June 2024	Untersberg-Arena, Grödig, Austria	Malta	5–1	7–1	Friendly

== Honours ==
Slavia Prague

- Czech First League: 2020–21
- Czech Cup: 2020–21, 2022–23

Feyenoord

- KNVB Cup: 2023–24
- Johan Cruyff Shield: 2024
