= Aiham Ousou =

Syrian footballer (born 2000)

Personal information
- Full name: Aiham Hanz Ousou
- Date of birth: 9 January 2000 (age 26)
- Place of birth: Mölndal, Sweden
- Height: 1.86 m (6 ft 1 in)
- Position: Centre-back

Team information
- Current team: Charleroi
- Number: 4

Youth career
- BK Bifrost
- Angered FC
- –2016: Angered MBIK
- 2017–2018: BK Häcken

Senior career*
| Years | Team | Apps | (Gls) |
| 2016 | Angered MBIK | 4 | (0) |
| 2017 | Västra Frölunda IF | 11 | (3) |
| 2018–2021 | BK Häcken | 0 | (0) |
| 2020 | → AFC Eskilstuna (loan) | 15 | (0) |
| 2021 | → GAIS (loan) | 9 | (0) |
| 2021–2025 | Slavia Prague | 45 | (2) |
| 2021 | → Slavia Prague B | 2 | (0) |
| 2023 | → Häcken (loan) | 7 | (0) |
| 2024 | → Cádiz (loan) | 6 | (0) |
| 2024 | → Charleroi (loan) | 18 | (0) |
| 2025– | Charleroi | 47 | (2) |

International career^{‡}
| 2018 | Sweden U19 | 5 | (1) |
| 2021–2022 | Sweden U21 | 8 | (0) |
| 2022 | Sweden | 1 | (0) |
| 2024– | Syria | 16 | (0) |
- * Club domestic league appearances and goals as of 1 June 2026 ‡ National team caps and goals as of 17 November 2026

Aiham Hanz Ousou (Arabic: أيهم هانز أوسو; born 9 January 2000) is a professional footballer who plays as a centre-back for Belgian club Charleroi. Born in Sweden, he plays for the Syria national team.

== Club career ==
=== Early career ===
Starting off his career with local clubs in the Gothenburg suburb Angered, Ousou made his senior debut in Division 5A Göteborg in 2016 with Angered MBIK. In 2017, he played half a season with Västra Frölunda IF in Division 3 Sydvästra Götaland before joining BK Häcken's youth organization the same year.

=== BK Häcken ===
After failing to get playing time with BK Häcken's senior team, he joined AFC Eskilstuna on loan for the 2020 Superettan season. He played 15 games in all competitions during that season. In 2021, he joined GAIS on loan and represented the club in both Superettan and Svenska Cupen during the spring season.

=== Slavia Prague ===
On 21 July 2021, Ousou joined Slavia Prague in the Czech First League. On 3 October 2021, whilst playing in his first Prague derby, Ousou picked up a red card in a 1–0 loss against Sparta Prague; Sparta scored from the resulting free-kick after Ousou's sending off.

==== Loan to BK Häcken ====
After failing to get regular playing time with Slavia's senior team, he joined BK Häcken on a half-year loan deal without option.

==== Loan to Cádiz CF ====
On 1 February 2024, Ousou joined Cádiz on a half-year loan deal with option to make the transfer permanent. A month later, on 9 March, he started his first La Liga match in a 2–0 win over Atlético Madrid, becoming the first Syrian to achieve this feat.

==== Loan to Charleroi ====
On 31 July 2024, Ousou moved on a new loan to Charleroi in Belgium, with an option to buy.

=== Charleroi ===
On 2 January 2025, Ousou signed a contract with Charleroi until June 2028.

== International career ==
Ousou was born in Mölndal, Sweden and is of Syrian descent. Ousou made three appearances for the Sweden U19 team in 2018. In 2021, he served as captain for the Sweden U21 team under Poya Asbaghi.

=== Sweden ===
On 10 June 2022, Ousou was called up to the Sweden national team for the first time, for a UEFA Nations League match against Norway, but did not end up playing the match. He made his Sweden debut on 19 November 2022, in a 2–0 friendly win against Algeria when he replaced Victor Lindelöf as centre back at halftime.

=== Syria ===
On 31 December 2023, Ousou was named in the 26-man squad of the Syria national football team for the upcoming 2023 AFC Asian Cup.

== Career statistics ==
=== Club ===
As of match played 28 April 2024

Appearances and goals by club, season and competition
| Club | Season | League | | | National Cup (Note: Includes Svenska Cupen and Czech Cup) | | Continental | | Total | |
| Club | Season | Division | Apps | Goals | Apps | Goals | Apps | Goals | Apps | Goals |
|---|---|---|---|---|---|---|---|---|---|---|
| Angered MBIK | 2016 | Division 5A Göteborg | 4 | 0 | — | | — | | 4 | 0 |
| Västra Frölunda IF | 2017 | Division 3 Sydvästra Götaland | 11 | 3 | — | | — | | 11 | 3 |
| BK Häcken | 2018 | Allsvenskan | 0 | 0 | — | | — | | 0 | 0 |
| BK Häcken | 2019 | Allsvenskan | 0 | 0 | — | | — | | 0 | 0 |
| BK Häcken | 2020 | Allsvenskan | 0 | 0 | — | | — | | 0 | 0 |
| BK Häcken | 2021 | Allsvenskan | 0 | 0 | — | | — | | 0 | 0 |
| BK Häcken | Total | | 0 | 0 | 0 | 0 | 0 | 0 | 0 | 0 |
| AFC Eskilstuna (loan) | 2020 | Superettan | 15 | 0 | — | | — | | 15 | 0 |
| GAIS (loan) | 2021 | Superettan | 9 | 0 | 2 | 0 | — | | 11 | 0 |
| Slavia Prague | 2021–22 | Czech First League | 25 | 1 | 2 | 0 | 11 (Note: Appearances in UEFA Conference League) | 0 | 38 | 1 |
| Slavia Prague | 2022–23 | Czech First League | 19 | 1 | 3 | 0 | 11 | 0 | 33 | 1 |
| Slavia Prague | 2023–24 | Czech First League | 1 | 0 | 0 | 0 | 1 (Note: Appearances in UEFA Europa League) | 0 | 2 | 0 |
| Slavia Prague | Total | | 45 | 2 | 5 | 0 | 23 | 0 | 73 | 2 |
| BK Häcken (loan) | 2023 | Allsvenskan | 7 | 0 | 1 | 0 | 5 | 0 | 13 | 0 |
| Cádiz (loan) | 2023–24 | La Liga | 6 | 0 | — | | — | | 6 | 0 |
| Career total | | | 97 | 5 | 8 | 0 | 28 | 0 | 133 | 5 |

=== International ===
As of match played 31 January 2024

Appearances and goals by national team and year
| National team | Year | Apps | Goals |
|---|---|---|---|
| Sweden | 2022 | 1 | 0 |
| Sweden | Total | 1 | 0 |
| Syria | 2024 | 5 | 0 |
| Syria | Total | 5 | 0 |
| Total | | 6 | 0 |
