= Václav Sejk =

Czech footballer (born 2002)

Personal information
- Date of birth: 18 May 2002 (age 24)
- Place of birth: Děčín, Czech Republic
- Height: 1.80 m (5 ft 11 in)
- Position: Forward

Team information
- Current team: Sigma Olomouc
- Number: 10

Youth career
- 2008–2011: TJ Spartak Boletice n.L.
- 2011–2015: Junior Děčín
- 2015–2017: Teplice
- 2017–2020: Sparta Prague

Senior career*
| Years | Team | Apps | (Gls) |
| 2020–2021 | Sparta Prague B | 16 | (4) |
| 2021–2026 | Sparta Prague | 12 | (0) |
| 2022 | → Teplice (loan) | 13 | (4) |
| 2022–2023 | → Jablonec (loan) | 30 | (7) |
| 2024 | → Roda JC (loan) | 15 | (8) |
| 2024–2025 | → Zagłębie Lubin (loan) | 16 | (1) |
| 2025 | → Famalicão (loan) | 16 | (3) |
| 2025–2026 | → Heerenveen (loan) | 17 | (3) |
| 2026 | Heerenveen | 0 | (0) |
| 2026– | Sigma Olomouc | 21 | (6) |

International career^{‡}
| 2017 | Czech Republic U15 | 4 | (1) |
| 2017–2018 | Czech Republic U16 | 6 | (0) |
| 2018–2019 | Czech Republic U17 | 13 | (6) |
| 2019 | Czech Republic U18 | 8 | (1) |
| 2021–2025 | Czech Republic U21 | 36 | (13) |
| 2025– | Czech Republic | 2 | (0) |
- * Club domestic league appearances and goals as of 26 September 2026 ‡ National team caps and goals as of 26 September 2026

Václav Sejk (born 18 May 2002) is a Czech professional footballer who plays as a forward for Czech First League club Sigma Olomouc and the Czech Republic national team.

== Club career ==
Sejk started his career with local sides TJ Spartak Boletice n.L. and FK Junior Děčín before joining Teplice in 2015. After moving to Sparta Prague in 2017, he progressed through the youth ranks and 'B' team, before being loaned back to Teplice in 2022. He started well for Teplice, and was noted for his goalscoring ability.

Since 2024, Sejk has been sent on a succession of loans from Sparta. First, in January 2024 to Eerste Divisie club Roda JC until the end of the season. In July 2024, he was sent on a season-long loan again, this time joining Ekstraklasa club Zagłębie Lubin.

On 9 January 2025, he joined Primeira Liga team Famalicão on a half-year loan deal.

On 26 July 2025, Sejk joined Eredivisie club Heerenveen on a loan deal with option to buy.

On 19 January 2026, Sejk signed a multi-year contract with Czech First League club Sigma Olomouc.

== Personal life ==
Sejk has been in a relationship with Czech footballer Gabriela Šlajsová. On 18 September 2025, Šlajsová gave a birth to their daughter Claudia.

== Career statistics ==
=== Club ===
As of match played 20 December 2025

Appearances and goals by club, season and competition
| Club | Season | League | | | National cup (Note: Includes Czech Cup, Polish Cup, KNVB Cup) | | Europe | | Other | | Total | |
| Club | Season | Division | Apps | Goals | Apps | Goals | Apps | Goals | Apps | Goals | Apps | Goals |
|---|---|---|---|---|---|---|---|---|---|---|---|---|
| Sparta Prague B | 2020–21 | ČFL | 1 | 0 | — | | — | | — | | 1 | 0 |
| Sparta Prague B | 2021–22 | Fortuna národní liga | 15 | 4 | — | | — | | — | | 15 | 4 |
| Sparta Prague B | Total | | 16 | 4 | — | | — | | — | | 16 | 4 |
| Sparta Prague | 2021–22 | Czech First League | 0 | 0 | 1 | 0 | 0 | 0 | — | | 1 | 0 |
| Sparta Prague | 2022–23 | Czech First League | 0 | 0 | 0 | 0 | 0 | 0 | — | | 0 | 0 |
| Sparta Prague | 2023–24 | Czech First League | 12 | 0 | 2 | 1 | 2 (Note: Appearances in UEFA Europa League) | 0 | — | | 16 | 1 |
| Sparta Prague | Total | | 12 | 0 | 3 | 1 | 2 | 0 | — | | 17 | 1 |
| Teplice (loan) | 2021–22 | Czech First League | 13 | 4 | 0 | 0 | — | | 0 | 0 | 13 | 4 |
| Jablonec (loan) | 2022–23 | Czech First League | 30 | 7 | 2 | 0 | — | | — | | 32 | 7 |
| Roda JC (loan) | 2023–24 | Eerste Divisie | 15 | 8 | — | | — | | 2 (Note: Appearances in Eredivisie promotion/relegation playoffs) | 0 | 17 | 8 |
| Zagłębie Lubin (loan) | 2024–25 | Ekstraklasa | 16 | 1 | 3 | 0 | — | | — | | 19 | 1 |
| Famalicão (loan) | 2024–25 | Primeira Liga | 16 | 3 | — | | — | | — | | 16 | 3 |
| Heerenveen (loan) | 2025–26 | Eredivisie | 17 | 3 | 2 | 1 | — | | — | | 19 | 4 |
| Career total | | | 135 | 30 | 10 | 2 | 2 | 0 | 2 | 0 | 149 | 32 |

=== International ===
As of match played 26 September 2026

Appearances and goals by national team and year
| National team | Year | Apps | Goals |
|---|---|---|---|
| Czech Republic | 2025 | 1 | 0 |
| Czech Republic | 2026 | 1 | 0 |
| Total | | 2 | 0 |
