= 2021–22 FK Teplice season =

FK Teplice
2021–22 season
- Chairman: Pavel Šedlbauer
- Manager: Radim Kučera
- Stadium: Na Stínadlech
- Czech First League: 14th
- Czech Cup: Pre-season
Home colours	Away colours

The 2021–22 season is the 30th season in the existence of FK Teplice and the club's 10th consecutive season in the top flight of Czech football. In addition to the domestic league, FK Teplice are participating in this season's edition of the Czech Cup.

== Players ==
=== First-team squad ===
As of 19 July 2021.

Note: Flags indicate national team as defined under FIFA eligibility rules; some limited exceptions apply. Players may hold more than one non-FIFA nationality.

No.	Pos.	Nation	Player
1	GK	CZE	Luděk Němeček
2	DF	CZE	Ondřej Mazuch
3	DF	FRA	Ruben Droehnlé
4	DF	CZE	Martin Chlumecký
7	MF	CZE	Patrik Žitný
10	MF	CZE	Pavel Moulis
11	FW	CZE	Jakub Mareš
13	MF	CZE	Štěpán Krunert (on loan from Dukla Prague)
14	FW	CZE	Tadeáš Vachoušek
15	FW	CZE	David Ledecký
16	MF	CZE	Alois Hyčka
17	DF	CZE	Tomáš Vondrášek
19	MF	CZE	Robert Jukl

No.	Pos.	Nation	Player
20	MF	CZE	Daniel Trubač
21	GK	CZE	Jan Čtvrtečka (on loan from Sparta Prague)
22	DF	CZE	Jan Shejbal
23	MF	CZE	Lukáš Mareček
24	MF	CZE	Matyáš Korselt
26	MF	CZE	David Černý
27	MF	CZE	Tomáš Kučera
28	DF	CZE	Jan Knapík
30	GK	CZE	Tomáš Grigar
35	MF	CZE	Matěj Radosta
36	DF	CZE	Ladislav Kodad
39	DF	CZE	Josef Švanda

=== Out on loan ===
Note: Flags indicate national team as defined under FIFA eligibility rules; some limited exceptions apply. Players may hold more than one non-FIFA nationality.

No.	Pos.	Nation	Player
—	MF	CZE	Jakub Emmer (at FK Ústí nad Labem)

== Pre-season and friendlies ==
Win Draw Loss Fixtures

== Competitions ==
=== Overall record ===
Competition	First match	Last match	Starting round	Record							
Competition	First match	Last match	Starting round	Pld	W	D	L	GF	GA	GD	Win %
Czech First League	25 July 2021	May 2022	Matchday 1	2	0	0	2	0	6	−6	0.00
Czech Cup	TBD			0	0	0	0	0	0	+0	—
Total				2	0	0	2	0	6	−6	0.00

Last updated: 31 July 2021
Source: Soccerway

=== Czech First League ===
==== League table ====
Pos	Team	Pld	W	D	L	GF	GA	GD	Pts	Qualification or relegation
10	České Budějovice	30	9	9	12	40	46	−6	36	Qualification for the play-off
11	Fastav Zlín	30	8	6	16	36	53	−17	30	Qualification for the relegation group
12	Teplice	30	8	3	19	29	49	−20	27	Qualification for the relegation group
13	Jablonec	30	4	14	12	22	45	−23	26	Qualification for the relegation group
14	Bohemians 1905	30	6	8	16	34	56	−22	26	Qualification for the relegation group

Source: Fortuna Liga
Rules for classification: 1) Points; 2) Head-to-head points; 3) Head-to-head goal difference; 4) Head-to-head goals scored; 5) Goal difference; 6) Goals scored; 7) Fair-play ranking; 8) Draw.

Pos	Team	Pld	W	D	L	GF	GA	GD	Pts	Qualification or relegation	PLZ	SLA	SPA	SLO	OST	HKR
1	Viktoria Plzeň (C)	35	26	7	2	63	21	+42	85	Qualification for the Champions League second qualifying round	—	—	3–0	3–1	1–0	—
2	Slavia Prague	35	24	6	5	80	27	+53	78	Qualification for the Europa Conference League second qualifying round	1–1	—	1–2	3–0	—	—
3	Sparta Prague	35	22	7	6	72	40	+32	73	Qualification for the Europa Conference League second qualifying round	—	—	—	1–2	3–1	1–1
4	Slovácko	35	21	5	9	59	38	+21	68	Qualification to Europa League third qualifying round (Note: Slovácko qualified for the Europa League as Czech Cup winners.)	—	—	—	—	3–1	3–0
5	Baník Ostrava	35	15	10	10	60	48	+12	55		—	1–1	—	—	—	3–1
6	Hradec Králové	35	10	14	11	44	52	−8	44		0–2	4–3	—	—	—	—

Source: Fortuna Liga
Legend: Blue = home team win; Yellow = draw; Red = away team win.
Rules for classification: 1) Total points; 2) Points earned in regular season; 3) Head-to-head points (regular season); 4) Head-to-head goal difference (regular season); 5) Head-to-head goals scored (regular season); 5) Goal difference (all matches); 6) Goals scored (all matches); 7) Fair-play ranking; 8) Draw.
(C) Champions
Notes:

Pos	Team	Pld	W	D	L	GF	GA	GD	Pts	Qualification or relegation	PCE	ZLN	JAB	BOH	TEP	KAR
12	Fastav Zlín	35	9	9	17	43	60	−17	36		—	—	1–1	1–4	3–0	—
13	Jablonec	35	6	16	13	27	48	−21	34		0–1	—	—	1–1	—	2–0
14	Bohemians 1905 (O)	35	8	10	17	45	61	−16	34	Qualification for the relegation play-offs	0–1	—	—	—	—	4–0
15	Teplice (O)	35	8	5	22	33	59	−26	29	Qualification for the relegation play-offs	0–2	—	0–1	2–2	—	—
16	Karviná (R)	35	3	10	22	33	63	−30	19	Relegation to the FNL	—	1–1	—	—	2–2	—

Source: Fortuna Liga
Legend: Blue = home team win; Yellow = draw; Red = away team win.
Rules for classification: 1) Total points; 2) Points earned in regular season; 3) Head-to-head points (regular season); 4) Head-to-head goal difference (regular season); 5) Head-to-head goals scored (regular season); 5) Goal difference (all matches); 6) Goals scored (all matches); 7) Fair-play ranking; 8) Draw.
(O) Play-off winners; (R) Relegated

==== Results summary ====
Overall								Home						Away					
Pld	W	D	L	GF	GA	GD	Pts	W	D	L	GF	GA	GD	W	D	L	GF	GA	GD
35	8	5	22	33	59	−26	29	5	2	11	16	24	−8	3	3	11	17	35	−18

Last updated: 14 May 2022.
Source: Fortuna Liga

==== Results by round ====
Round	1	2	3	4	5	6	7	8	9	10	11	12	13	14	15	16	17	18	19	20	21	22	23	24	25	26	27	28	29	30	31	32	33	34	35
Ground	A	H	A	H	A	A																													
Result	L	L	L	W	L	L																													
Position	15	14	16	13	14	15																													

Updated to match(es) played on 29 August 2021. Source: Fortuna Liga
A = Away; H = Home; W = Win; D = Draw; L = Loss
