= Eduardo Santos (footballer) =

Brazilian footballer (born 1997)

Personal information
- Full name: Eduardo Gonzaga Mendes Santos
- Date of birth: 28 November 1997 (age 28)
- Place of birth: São Paulo, Brazil
- Height: 1.96 m (6 ft 5 in)
- Position: Centre-back

Team information
- Current team: Red Bull Bragantino
- Number: 3

Youth career
- 2010–2015: Fluminense
- 2015–2017: Juventus da Mooca
- 2017–2018: Fluminense

Senior career*
Years	Team	Apps	(Gls)
2018–2020	Fluminense	0	(0)
2018	→ Real (loan)	16	(0)
2018–2019	→ Famalicão (loan)	1	(0)
2019	→ São Bento (loan)	4	(0)
2020	Capivariano	0	(0)
2020	→ Karviná (loan)	9	(0)
2020–2022	Karviná	48	(3)
2022	→ Viktoria Plzeň (loan)	10	(0)
2022–2023	Slavia Prague	12	(0)
2022	→ Slavia Prague B	1	(0)
2023	→ Red Bull Bragantino (loan)	13	(1)
2023–	Red Bull Bragantino	45	(1)
- * Club domestic league appearances and goals as of 7 April 2026

Eduardo Gonzaga Mendes Santos (born 28 November 1997) is a Brazilian professional footballer who plays as a centre-back for Red Bull Bragantino.

== Career ==
Santos began his career at the age of 13, signing for Fluminense, after initially playing street football. After a short spell at Juventus da Mooca, Santos rejoined Fluminense for a fee of R$415,310 in 2017. At Fluminense, Santos was loaned out in 2018 to Portuguese LigaPro sides Real, where he made 16 league appearances, and Famalicão, where he made one league appearance. In 2019, Santos was loaned to Brazilian Série B club São Bento, making four league appearances during his time at the club.

In 2020, Santos left Fluminense to join Capivariano, before joining Czech club Karviná on loan alongside fellow Capivariano player Jean Mangabeira. After nine league appearances for Karviná in the 2019–20 Czech First League season, Santos made his move to the club permanent ahead of the following season. On 21 February 2022, after 57 appearances and three goals in all competitions for Karviná, Viktoria Plzeň announced the signing of Santos on a six-month loan. Santos made ten appearances as Viktoria Plzeň won the Czech First League for the first time since 2018. On 11 June 2022, Slavia Prague announced the signing of Santos on a four-year contract. In April 2023, he returned on loan to Brazil with Red Bull Bragantino until December. On 8 December 2023, Red Bull Bragantino activate option on Santos and signed him on permanent deal.
