= Matěj Valenta =

Czech footballer (born 2000)

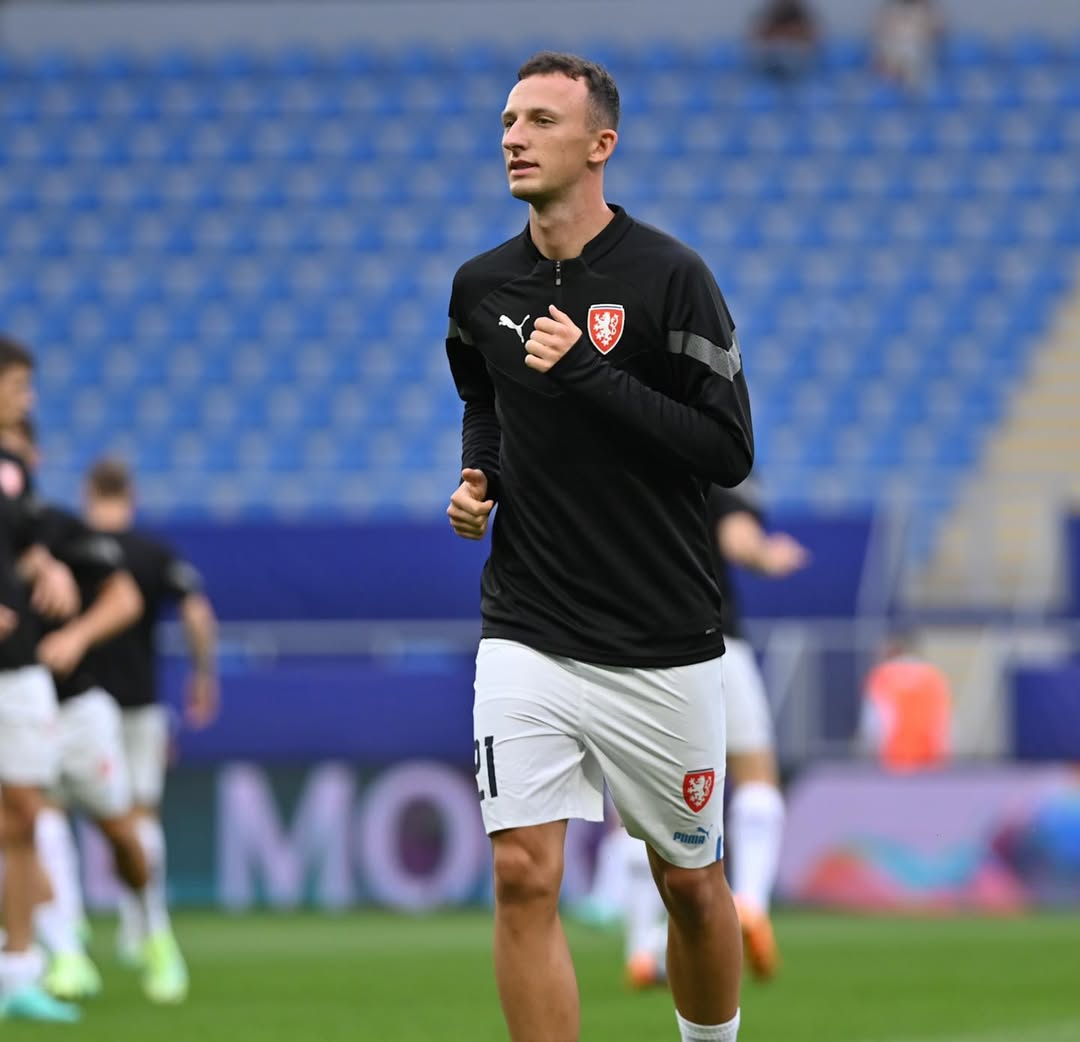
- Matěj Valenta in Batumi (2023)

Personal information
- Date of birth: 9 February 2000 (age 26)
- Place of birth: Prague, Czech Republic
- Height: 1.81 m (5 ft 11 in)
- Position: Central midfielder

Team information
- Current team: Hradec Králové
- Number: 9

Youth career
- 2006–2018: Slavia Prague

Senior career*
Years	Team	Apps	(Gls)
2018–2019	Slavia Prague	2	(0)
2019–2020	→ Ústí nad Labem (loan)	38	(1)
2020–2022	České Budějovice	43	(2)
2022–2024	Slavia Prague	5	(0)
2022–2023	→ Slovan Liberec (loan)	24	(2)
2023–2024	→ Slovácko (loan)	18	(3)
2024–2026	Viktoria Plzeň	50	(2)
2026–	Hradec Králové	5	(0)

International career^{‡}
2018	Czech Republic U18	9	(1)
2018	Czech Republic U19	2	(0)
2022–2023	Czech Republic U21	8	(1)
Medal record
Czech First League
First place	2018/19	Slavia Prague
Third place	2023/24	Viktoria Plzeň
Second place	2024/25	Viktoria Plzeň
Czech Cup
First place	2018/19	Slavia Prague
- * Club domestic league appearances and goals as of 28 August 2026 ‡ National team caps and goals as of 28 August 2026

Matěj Valenta (born 9 February 2000, Prague) is a Czech professional footballer who plays as a central midfielder for FC Hradec Králové. He is a former youth international for the Czech Republic.

== Club career ==
=== Youth years ===
Valenta is a product of Slavia Prague's academy, where he played from 2006 (from the age of six). He attracted the attention of the first-team staff particularly in the 2017–18 season, when he scored 12 goals in just 11 matches for the club's U19 side.

=== Slavia Prague ===
Valenta made his Czech First League debut for Slavia as an eighteen-year-old in summer 2018, coming on late in a match against Teplice. He also played a full match in the Czech Cup (MOL Cup) against Ústí nad Labem and was an unused substitute in the UEFA Europa League group-stage matches against Zenit Saint Petersburg and Bordeaux.

In the 2018–19 season, Slavia won both the league and the Czech Cup; as Valenta appeared in both competitions, he was part of the double-winning squad.

==== Ústí nad Labem (loan) ====
In January 2019, Valenta joined second-tier Ústí nad Labem on an 18-month loan to gain regular playing time and experience. Over the spell he made 36 league appearances and scored one goal, and he also played two matches in the Czech Cup.

=== České Budějovice ===
Having failed to establish himself permanently in Slavia's first team, Valenta moved in summer 2020 to Dynamo České Budějovice. His stay in South Bohemia was relatively short: thanks to his performances (43 matches, 2 goals), Slavia decided to activate a buy-back clause in summer 2022. Valenta subsequently signed a four-year contract with Slavia, running until June 2026.

=== Return to Slavia Prague ===
==== Slovan Liberec (loan) ====
After returning to Slavia in summer 2022, Valenta took part in pre-season with the Prague club and in September moved on loan to Slovan Liberec. After six months in northern Bohemia, he opted to remain at Liberec for the spring part of the season in order to secure more playing time and help his chances of being selected for the 2023 UEFA European Under-21 Championship. The loan delivered exactly what he was after, as he went on to make 24 appearances and score twice for Liberec.

==== Slovácko (loan) ====
In summer 2023, Viktoria Plzeň showed interest in signing Valenta. However, instead of a permanent move to Plzeň, he left Slavia on another loan—this time to Slovácko. A decisive factor was reported to be the interest of head coach Martin Svědík.

=== Viktoria Plzeň ===
In January 2024, Valenta's loan at Slovácko was ended early. On the back of his performances there (18 matches, 3 goals), he earned a permanent move to Viktoria Plzeň and signed a multi-year contract through June 2027. Together with Lukáš Červ, Valenta was part of the deal that saw goalkeeper Jindřich Staněk move to Slavia.

He had a very promising start in Plzeň, including full 90 minutes in a 4–0 league win over Sparta Prague, but the momentum was soon halted by a knee injury suffered in training. He subsequently underwent meniscus surgery, which ruled him out for the remainder of the season. During 2025, however, he started to establish himself again as a regular in the starting XI under new head coach Martin Hyský. In total, he has made 50 appearances for Plzeň, scoring 2 goals and registering 4 assists. In April 2026, Valenta extended his contract with Plzeň for three more years, that is until June 2029.

=== Hradec Králové ===
In July 2026, Valenta joined Hradec Králové, signing a three-year contract with the club. The reported transfer fee was approximately CZK 48 million.

== International career ==
Valenta made a total of 11 appearances for the Czech Republic at under-18 and under-19 level, scoring one goal. After a several-year break, he was called up in March 2022 to the Czech Republic under-21 squad for UEFA European Under-21 Championship qualification matches against Albania and Andorra. He went on to earn eight caps and score one goal for the under-21 team. Three of those appearances came at the 2023 UEFA European Under-21 Championship, co-hosted by Georgia and Romania.

== Club statistics ==
As of 28 August 2026.

Club	Season	League		Domestic Cups		European Cups	
Club	Season	Apps	Goals	Apps	Goals	Apps	Goals
Slavia Prague	2018/19	1	0	1	0	-	
Ústí nad Labem	2018/19	8	0	-		-	
Ústí nad Labem	2019/20	28	1	2	0	-	
České Budějovice	2020/21	19	1	1	0	-	
České Budějovice	2021/22	21	1	2	0	-	
Slavia Prague	2022/23	3	0	-		2	0
Slovan Liberec	2022/23	22	2	2	0	-	
Slovácko	2023/24	17	3	1	0	-	
Viktoria Plzeň	2023/24	4	0	-		-	
Viktoria Plzeň	2024/25	8	0	3	1	-	
Viktoria Plzeň	2025/26	22	1	3	0	10	0
Hradec Králové	2026/27	2	0	-	-	3	0
Career Total		155	9	15	1	15	0

== Honours ==
Slavia Prague

- Czech First League: 2018/19
- Czech Cup: 2018/19

Viktoria Plzeň

- Czech First League: 2023/24
- Czech First League: 2024/25
