= Valdek =

Valdek may refer to places in the Czech Republic:

- Valdek Castle, a castle ruin in the Central Bohemian Region
- Valdek, a village and part of Staré Křečany in the Ústí nad Labem Region
