= Daniel Samek =

Czech footballer

Personal information
- Date of birth: 19 February 2004 (age 22)
- Place of birth: Chaloupky, Czech Republic
- Height: 1.84 m (6 ft 0 in)
- Positions: Defender; midfielder

Team information
- Current team: Kladno (on loan from Artis Brno)

Youth career
- 2010–2018: Hradec Králové
- 2018–2021: Slavia Prague

Senior career*
Years	Team	Apps	(Gls)
2021–2022	Slavia Prague	21	(3)
2022–2025	Lecce	0	(0)
2024–2025	→ Hradec Králové (loan)	21	(0)
2025–	Artis Brno	26	(1)
2026–	→ Kladno (loan)	0	(0)

International career^{‡}
2019	Czech Republic U15	10	(0)
2019–2020	Czech Republic U16	10	(2)
2021–2023	Czech Republic U19	12	(0)
2023–	Czech Republic U20	6	(0)
- * Club domestic league appearances and goals as of 24 May 2026 ‡ National team caps and goals as of 25 March 2025

Daniel Samek (born 19 February 2004) is a Czech professional footballer who plays as a defender or midfielder for Czech National Football League club Kladno on loan from Artis Brno.

== Club career ==
Samek began his career at Hradec Králové, joining Slavia Prague's academy in 2018. On 3 March 2021, Samek made his debut for Slavia Prague, coming on as a 70th-minute substitute in a 10–3 Czech Cup win against Slavia Karlovy Vary, becoming the youngest player in the club's history. On 23 May 2021, Samek made his league debut for Slavia Prague, starting in a 1–1 draw against Jablonec. On 22 August 2021, Samek scored his first goal for Slavia, scoring the second goal in a 4–0 win against Baník Ostrava. Samek also assisted the opening goal for Stanislav Tecl during the tie.

On 30 July 2022, Samek signed a five-year contract with Lecce in Italy. On 25 August 2024, Samek was loaned to Hradec Králové, with an option to buy.

On 2 July 2025, Samek moved to Artis Brno on a three-season contract.

On 8 September 2026, Samek joined Czech National Football League club Kladno on a loan deal.

== International career ==
Samek has represented the Czech Republic at under-15, under-16 and under-19 level.

== Style of play ==
Former Italian international Stefano Torrisi has described Samek as a "modern midfielder" who is "physically well built". Samek has been compared to Czech Republic captain Tomáš Souček and Barcelona midfielder Frenkie de Jong as a result of his "offensive and defensive actions", "good dribbling" and "good passing technique".

== Career statistics ==
As of match played 23 August 2023

Appearances and goals by club, season and competition
Club	Season	League			National cup (Note: Includes Czech Cup)		Continental		Other		Total	
Club	Season	Division	Apps	Goals	Apps	Goals	Apps	Goals	Apps	Goals	Apps	Goals
Slavia Prague B	2020–21	CFL	1	0	—		—		—		1	0
Slavia Prague B	2021–22	CFL	5	1	—		—		—		5	1
Slavia Prague B	Total		6	1	—		—		—		6	1
Slavia Prague	2020–21	Czech First League	2	0	1	0	—		—		3	0
Slavia Prague	2021–22	Czech First League	19	3	2	0	7 (Note: One appearance in UEFA Europa League, six appearances in UEFA Conference League)	0	—		28	3
Slavia Prague	Total		21	3	3	0	7	0	—		31	3
Career total			27	4	3	0	7	0	0	0	37	4
