= 2021–22 SK Slavia Prague season =

Slavia Prague
2021–22 season
- President: Jaroslav Tvrdík
- Head coach: Jindřich Trpišovský
- Stadium: Eden Arena
- Czech First League: 2nd
- Czech Cup: Quarter-final vs Sparta Prague
- Champions League: Third qualifying round vs Ferencváros
- UEFA Europa League: Play-off round vs Legia Warsaw
- UEFA Europa Conference League: Quarterfinal vs Feyenoord
- Top goalscorer: League: Ondřej Lingr (14); All: Ondřej Lingr (15)
Home colours	Away colours	Third colours

The 2021–22 season was the 130th season in the existence of SK Slavia Prague and the club's 29th consecutive season in the top flight of Czech football. Domestically, Slavia finished the season 2nd in the league and reached the quarterfinal's of the Czech Cup. In Europe, Slavia where knocked out of the Champions League at the Third qualifying round stage by Ferencváros, the Play-off round of the UEFA Europa League by Legia Warsaw and reached the quarterfinal of the UEFA Europa Conference League where they were defeated by Feyenoord.

== Squad ==
As of match played 15 May 2022

No.	Name	Nationality	Position	Date of birth (age)	Signed from	Signed in	Contract ends	Apps.	Goals
Goalkeepers
1	Ondřej Kolář	(Czech Republic)	GK	17 October 1994 (aged 27)	Slovan Liberec	2018		175	1
28	Aleš Mandous	(Czech Republic)	GK	21 April 1992 (aged 30)	Sigma Olomouc	2021	2026	32	0
31	Přemysl Kovář	(Czech Republic)	GK	14 October 1985 (aged 36)	Cherno More	2017		17	0
Defenders
2	David Hovorka	(Czech Republic)	DF	7 August 1993 (aged 28)	Jablonec	2019		35	1
3	Tomáš Holeš	(Czech Republic)	DF	31 March 1993 (aged 29)	Jablonec	2019		98	12
4	Aiham Ousou	(Sweden)	DF	9 January 2000 (aged 22)	BK Häcken	2021	2026	38	1
5	Alexander Bah	(Denmark)	DF	9 December 1997 (aged 24)	SønderjyskE	2021		67	8
6	Maksym Talovyerov	(Ukraine)	DF	28 June 2000 (aged 21)	Dynamo České Budějovice	2022	2026	15	0
13	Daniel Samek	(Czech Republic)	DF	19 February 2004 (aged 18)	Hradec Králové	2018		31	3
15	Ondřej Kúdela	(Czech Republic)	DF	26 March 1987 (aged 35)	Slovan Liberec	2018		140	14
18	Jan Bořil	(Czech Republic)	DF	11 January 1991 (aged 31)	Mladá Boleslav	2016		210	11
30	Taras Kacharaba	(Ukraine)	DF	7 January 1995 (aged 27)	Slovan Liberec	2022	2024	46	1
33	David Jurásek	(Czech Republic)	DF	7 August 2000 (aged 21)	Mladá Boleslav	2022	2026	11	1
Midfielders
8	Lukáš Masopust	(Czech Republic)	MF	12 February 1993 (aged 29)	Jablonec	2019		130	17
10	Srđan Plavšić	(Serbia)	MF	3 December 1995 (aged 26)	Sparta Prague	2021	2024	37	1
17	Lukáš Provod	(Czech Republic)	MF	23 October 1996 (aged 25)	Viktoria Plzeň	2020		71	10
19	Oscar Dorley	(Liberia)	MF	19 July 1998 (aged 23)	Slovan Liberec	2019		85	4
20	Yira Sor	(Nigeria)	MF	24 July 2000 (aged 21)	Baník Ostrava	2022	2026	17	7
21	Mads Madsen	(Denmark)	MF	14 January 1998 (aged 24)	LASK	2021	2025	17	1
23	Petr Ševčík	(Czech Republic)	MF	2 May 1994 (aged 28)	Slovan Liberec	2019		92	10
25	Jakub Hromada	(Slovakia)	MF	25 May 1996 (aged 25)	Sampdoria	2017		72	2
27	Ibrahim Traoré	(Ivory Coast)	MF	16 September 1988 (aged 33)	Fastav Zlín	2019		151	17
32	Ondřej Lingr	(Czech Republic)	MF	7 October 1998 (aged 23)	Karviná	2020		92	23
Forwards
9	Peter Olayinka	(Nigeria)	FW	18 November 1995 (aged 26)	Gent	2018		146	33
11	Stanislav Tecl	(Czech Republic)	FW	1 September 1990 (aged 31)	Jablonec	2017		137	28
14	Daniel Fila	(Czech Republic)	FW	21 August 2002 (aged 19)	Mladá Boleslav	2022	2026	12	1
22	Michael Krmenčík	(Czech Republic)	FW	15 March 1993 (aged 29)	on loan from Club Brugge	2021	2022	21	4
26	Ivan Schranz	(Slovakia)	FW	13 September 1993 (aged 28)	Jablonec	2021	2024	44	13
35	Daniel Šmiga	(Czech Republic)	FW	2 January 2004 (aged 18)	Baník Ostrava	2022	2026	1	0
Slavia B Players
33	Adam Pudil	(Czech Republic)	MF	7 April 2005 (aged 17)	Academy	2021		1	0
35	Miloš Pudil	(Czech Republic)	DF	7 April 2005 (aged 17)	Academy	2021		1	0
35	Moses Usor	(Nigeria)	FW	5 February 2002 (aged 20)	36 Lion FC	2022		1	0
44	Erik Biegon	(Czech Republic)	FW	29 April 2004 (aged 18)	Academy	2021		1	0
	Jan Sirotník	(Czech Republic)	GK	16 February 2002 (aged 20)	Academy	2019		0	0
	Matouš Nikl	(Czech Republic)	MF	2 February 2002 (aged 20)	1. FK Příbram	2021		1	0
	Jakub Zeronik	(Czech Republic)	MF	11 February 2001 (aged 21)	Academy	2019		0	0
Away on loan
	Antonin Kinsky	(Czech Republic)	GK	13 March 2003 (aged 19)	Dukla Prague	2021	2025	1	0
	Jakub Markovič	(Czech Republic)	GK	13 July 2001 (aged 20)	Academy	2019		3	0
	Jan Stejskal	(Czech Republic)	GK	14 February 1997 (aged 25)	Mladá Boleslav	2021		3	0
	Matyáš Vágner	(Czech Republic)	GK	5 February 2003 (aged 19)	Academy	2020		3	0
	Mohamed Tijani	(Ivory Coast)	DF	10 July 1997 (aged 24)	Vysočina Jihlava	2020		2	0
	Michal Hošek	(Czech Republic)	DF	22 April 2001 (aged 21)	Academy	2019		2	0
	Ondřej Karafiát	(Czech Republic)	DF	1 December 1994 (aged 27)	Slovan Liberec	2020		7	0
	Daniel Kosek	(Czech Republic)	DF	19 May 2001 (aged 20)	Academy	2019		2	0
	Frantisek Matys	(Czech Republic)	DF	5 August 2002 (aged 19)	Academy	2020		1	0
	Filip Prebsl	(Czech Republic)	DF	4 March 2003 (aged 19)	Academy	2020		0	0
	Laco Takács	(Czech Republic)	DF	15 July 1996 (aged 25)	Mladá Boleslav	2020		23	2
	Tomáš Vlček	(Czech Republic)	DF	28 February 2001 (aged 21)	Academy	2019		2	0
	Filip Blecha	(Czech Republic)	MF	16 July 1997 (aged 24)	Vlašim	2022		0	0
	Michal Beran	(Czech Republic)	MF	22 August 2000 (aged 21)	Slovan Liberec	2020		8	0
	Lukáš Červ	(Czech Republic)	MF	10 April 2001 (aged 21)	Academy	2020		1	0
	Martin Douděra	(Czech Republic)	MF	1 April 2002 (aged 20)	Academy	2019		0	0
	Patrik Hellebrand	(Czech Republic)	MF	16 May 1999 (aged 22)	1. Slovácko	2020		10	0
	Marek Icha	(Czech Republic)	MF	14 March 2002 (aged 20)	MAS Táborsko	2022	2025	0	0
	Matěj Jurásek	(Czech Republic)	MF	30 August 2003 (aged 18)	Academy	2021		0	0
	Jakub Křišťan	(Czech Republic)	MF	5 July 2002 (aged 19)	Academy	2020		0	0
	Tomáš Malínský	(Czech Republic)	MF	25 August 1991 (aged 30)	Slovan Liberec	2020		7	0
	Jan Matoušek	(Czech Republic)	MF	9 May 1998 (aged 24)	1. FK Příbram	2018		13	1
	Ubong Ekpai	(Nigeria)	MF	17 October 1995 (aged 26)	Viktoria Plzeň	2021		22	2
	Tomáš Rigo	(Slovakia)	MF	3 July 2002 (aged 19)	Ružomberok	2018		3	0
	Abdulla Yusuf Helal	(Bahrain)	FW	12 June 1993 (aged 28)	Bohemians 1905	2019		31	3
	Petar Musa	(Croatia)	FW	4 March 1998 (aged 24)	Inter Zaprešić	2017		39	11
	Filip Horský	(Czech Republic)	FW	9 May 2003 (aged 19)	Academy	2021		1	0
	Denis Alijagić	(Czech Republic)	FW	10 April 2003 (aged 19)	Academy	2020		0	0
	Jonáš Kneifel	(Czech Republic)	FW	28 March 2002 (aged 20)	Academy	2020		0	0
	Adam Toula	(Czech Republic)	FW	11 February 2002 (aged 20)	Academy	2020		0	0
	Mick van Buren	(Netherlands)	FW	24 August 1992 (aged 29)	Esbjerg	2016		100	16
Players who left during the season
6	David Zima	(Czech Republic)	DF	8 November 2000 (aged 21)	Sigma Olomouc	2020		54	1
7	Nicolae Stanciu	(Romania)	MF	7 May 1993 (aged 29)	Al Ahli	2019		113	26
12	Abdallah Sima	(Senegal)	FW	17 June 2001 (aged 20)	MAS Táborsko	2020		39	16
	Lukáš Pokorný	(Czech Republic)	DF	5 July 1993 (aged 28)	Montpellier	2018		6	0
	Michal Vaněk	(Czech Republic)	MF	19 September 2000 (aged 21)	Academy	2018		1	0
	João Felipe	(Brazil)	FW	24 June 2001 (aged 20)	Palmeiras	2021		2	1

=== Out on loan ===
Note: Flags indicate national team as defined under FIFA eligibility rules; some limited exceptions apply. Players may hold more than one non-FIFA nationality.

No.	Pos.	Nation	Player
—	GK	CZE	Antonín Kinský (at MFK Vyškov)
—	GK	CZE	Jakub Markovič (at FK Pardubice)
—	GK	CZE	Jan Stejskal (at Sigma Olomouc)
—	GK	CZE	Matyáš Vágner (at Vlašim)
—	DF	CIV	Mohamed Tijani (at FK Teplice)
—	DF	CZE	Michal Hošek (at Vlašim)
—	DF	CZE	Ondřej Karafiát (at Mladá Boleslav)
—	DF	CZE	Daniel Kosek (at Táborsko)
—	DF	CZE	František Matys (at MFK Vyškov)
—	DF	CZE	Filip Prebsl (at Slovan Liberec)
—	DF	CZE	Laco Takács (at Baník Ostrava)
—	DF	CZE	Tomáš Vlček (at Vysočina Jihlava)
—	MF	CZE	Filip Blecha (at Zbrojovka Brno)
—	MF	CZE	Michal Beran (at Bohemians 1905)
—	MF	CZE	Lukáš Červ (at FK Pardubice)
—	MF	CZE	Martin Douděra (at Vlašim)

No.	Pos.	Nation	Player
—	MF	CZE	Patrik Hellebrand (at Opava)
—	MF	CZE	Marek Icha (at Vlašim)
—	MF	CZE	Matěj Jurásek (at Vlašim)
—	MF	CZE	Jakub Křišťan (at Vlašim)
—	MF	CZE	Tomáš Malínský (at FK Jablonec)
—	MF	CZE	Jan Matoušek (at Slovan Liberec)
—	MF	NGR	Ubong Ekpai (at Baník Ostrava)
—	MF	SVK	Tomáš Rigo (at Vlašim)
—	FW	BHR	Abdulla Yusuf Helal (at Slovan Liberec)
—	FW	CRO	Petar Musa (at Boavista F.C.)
—	FW	CZE	Filip Horský (at Mladá Boleslav)
—	FW	CZE	Denis Alijagić (at Slovan Liberec)
—	FW	CZE	Jonáš Kneifel (at Vlašim)
—	FW	CZE	Adam Toula (at Vlašim)
—	FW	NED	Mick van Buren (at České Budějovice)

== Transfers ==
=== In ===
Date	Position	Nationality	Name	From	Fee	Ref.
8 June 2021	FW	(Slovakia)	Ivan Schranz	Jablonec	Undisclosed	
23 June 2021	MF	(Nigeria)	Ubong Ekpai	Viktoria Plzeň	Free	
1 July 2021	MF	(Serbia)	Srđan Plavšić	Sparta Prague	Free	
5 July 2021	MF	(Denmark)	Mads Madsen	LASK	Undisclosed	
12 July 2021	GK	(Czech Republic)	Aleš Mandous	Sigma Olomouc	Undisclosed	
21 July 2021	DF	(Sweden)	Aiham Ousou	BK Häcken	Undisclosed	
28 July 2021	GK	(Czech Republic)	Antonín Kinský	Dukla Prague	Undisclosed	
31 December 2021	DF	(Ukraine)	Taras Kacharaba	Slovan Liberec	Undisclosed	
5 January 2022	DF	(Ukraine)	Maksym Talovyerov	Dynamo České Budějovice	Undisclosed	
5 January 2022	MF	(Czech Republic)	Filip Blecha	Sellier & Bellot Vlašim	Undisclosed	
5 January 2022	MF	(Czech Republic)	Marek Icha	MAS Táborsko	Undisclosed	
21 January 2022	MF	(Nigeria)	Yira Sor	Baník Ostrava	Undisclosed	
10 February 2022	MF	(Czech Republic)	David Jurásek	Mladá Boleslav	Undisclosed	
10 February 2022	FW	(Czech Republic)	Daniel Fila	Mladá Boleslav	Undisclosed	
22 February 2022	FW	(Czech Republic)	Daniel Šmiga	Baník Ostrava	Undisclosed	

=== Loans in ===
Date from	Position	Nationality	Name	From	Date to	Ref.
21 July 2021	DF	(Ukraine)	Taras Kacharaba	Slovan Liberec	31 December 2021	
23 July 2021	FW	(Czech Republic)	Michael Krmenčík	Club Brugge	End of season	

=== Out ===
Date	Position	Nationality	Name	To	Fee	Ref.
12 January 2022	FW	(Czech Republic)	Jan Kuchta	Lokomotiv Moscow	Undisclosed	
1 February 2022	MF	(Czech Republic)	Denis Višinský	Slovan Liberec	Undisclosed	
15 February 2022	MF	(Romania)	Nicolae Stanciu	Wuhan Three Towns	Undisclosed	

=== Loans out ===
Date from	Position	Nationality	Name	To	Date to	Ref.
12 July 2021	GK	(Czech Republic)	Jan Stejskal	Sigma Olomouc	End of season	
22 December 2021	DF	(Ivory Coast)	Mohamed Tijani	Teplice	End of season	
5 January 2022	MF	(Czech Republic)	Marek Icha	Sellier & Bellot Vlašim	End of season	
21 January 2022	MF	(Nigeria)	Ubong Ekpai	Baník Ostrava	End of season	
1 February 2022	GK	(Czech Republic)	Antonín Kinský	MFK Vyškov	Undisclosed	
1 February 2022	DF	(Czech Republic)	František Matys	MFK Vyškov	Undisclosed	
1 February 2022	FW	(Czech Republic)	Denis Alijagić	Slovan Liberec	Undisclosed	
19 February 2022	FW	(Czech Republic)	Filip Horský	Mladá Boleslav	End of season	
22 February 2022	DF	(Czech Republic)	Filip Prebsl	Slovan Liberec	End of 2022-23 season	
22 February 2022	DF	(Czech Republic)	Laco Takács	Baník Ostrava	End of season	

=== Released ===
Date	Position	Nationality	Name	Joined	Date	Ref
24 November 2021	DF	(Czech Republic)	Lukáš Pokorný	Retired		

== Friendlies ==
15 July 2021 Friendly	FC Juniors OÖ (Austria)	Cancelled	(Czech Republic) Slavia Prague	Austria
16:00 CEST (UTC+2)

16 July 2021 Friendly	Slavia Prague (Czech Republic)	1–1	(Poland) Piast Gliwice	Austria
15:00 CEST (UTC+2)

== Competitions ==
=== Overall record ===
Competition	First match	Last match	Starting round	Final position	Record							
Competition	First match	Last match	Starting round	Final position	Pld	W	D	L	GF	GA	GD	Win %
Czech First League	25 July 2021		Matchday 1	2nd	35	24	6	5	80	27	+53	68.57
Czech Cup	22 September 2021	9 February 2022	Third round	Quarterfinal	3	2	0	1	7	5	+2	66.67
UEFA Champions League	4 August 2021	10 August 2021	Third qualifying round	Third qualifying round	2	1	0	1	1	2	−1	50.00
UEFA Europa League	19 August 2021	26 August 2021	Play-off round	Play-off round	2	0	1	1	3	4	−1	0.00
UEFA Europa Conference League	16 September 2021	14 April 2022	Group stage	Quarterfinal	10	5	1	4	25	22	+3	50.00
Total					52	32	8	12	116	60	+56	61.54

Last updated: 15 May 2022
Source: Competitions

=== Czech First League ===
==== Regular season ====
===== League table =====
Pos	Team	Pld	W	D	L	GF	GA	GD	Pts	Qualification or relegation
1	Slavia Prague	30	23	4	3	71	19	+52	73	Qualification for the championship group
2	Viktoria Plzeň	30	22	6	2	53	19	+34	72	Qualification for the championship group
3	Sparta Prague	30	20	6	4	65	32	+33	66	Qualification for the championship group
4	Slovácko	30	18	5	7	50	30	+20	59	Qualification for the championship group
5	Baník Ostrava	30	14	9	7	54	39	+15	51	Qualification for the championship group

Source: Fortuna Liga
Rules for classification: 1) Points; 2) Head-to-head points; 3) Head-to-head goal difference; 4) Head-to-head goals scored; 5) Goal difference; 6) Goals scored; 7) Fair-play ranking; 8) Draw.

===== Results summary =====
Overall								Home						Away					
Pld	W	D	L	GF	GA	GD	Pts	W	D	L	GF	GA	GD	W	D	L	GF	GA	GD
30	23	4	3	71	19	+52	73	14	0	1	37	4	+33	9	4	2	34	15	+19

Last updated: 20 April 2022.
Source: See results

===== Results by round =====
Round	1	2	3	4	5	6	7	8	9	10	11	12	13	14	15	16	17	18	19	20	21	22	23	24	25	26	27	28	29	30
Ground	A	A	A	H	A	H	A	H	H	H	A	H	H	A	H	H	A	H	A	H	A	H	A	H	A	H	A	H	A	H
Result	W	W	W	W	D	W	W	W	L	W	D	W	W	W	W	W	W	W	D	L	W	W	W	W	L	W	D	W	W	W
Position	3	2	4	4	3	3	3	2	2	3	3	4	2	1	1	1	1	1	1	2	1	1	1	1	2	2	2	1	1	1

Updated to match(es) played on 20 April 2022. Source: See results
A = Away; H = Home; W = Win; D = Draw; L = Loss

===== Results =====
25 July 2021 1	Fastav Zlín	0–1	Slavia Prague	Zlín
19:00 CEST (UTC+2)	Condé (yellow card) 17'	Report	Kuchta 70'	Stadium: Letná Stadion; Attendance: 4,112; Referee: Miroslav Zelinka

30 July 2021 2	Teplice	1–3	Slavia Prague	Teplice
19:00 CEST (UTC+2)	D.Lanka (yellow card) 15'; Chlumecký (yellow card) 17'; R.Jukl (yellow card) 27'	Report	Schranz 22', 45+1', 81'; Zima (yellow card) 51'; Ševčík (yellow card) 66'	Stadium: Na Stínadlech; Attendance: 7,745; Referee: Ondřej Pechanec

14 August 2021 4	Mladá Boleslav	0–2	Slavia Prague	Mladá Boleslav
16:00 CEST (UTC+2)	V.Smrž (red card) 45+2'; Plechatý (yellow card) 66'	Report	Kuchta 36'; Kúdela (yellow card) 40'; Schranz 83'; Hromada (yellow card) 86'	Stadium: Lokotrans Aréna; Attendance: 3,712; Referee: Miroslav Zelinka

22 August 2021 5	Slavia Prague	4–0	Baník Ostrava	Prague
19:00 CEST (UTC+2)	Kacharaba (yellow card) 15'; Tecl 30'; Kúdela (yellow card) 32' (goal) 66' (pen.); Samek 45'; Lingr 51'; Hromada (yellow card) 78'	Report	Almási (yellow card) 25'; Dyjan (yellow card) 29'; Svozil (yellow card) 42'; Ndefe (yellow card) 45+2' (yellow-red card) 78'	Stadium: Sinobo Stadium; Attendance: 11,846; Referee: Ondřej Berka

29 August 2021 6	MFK Karviná	3–3	Slavia Prague	Karviná
19:00 CEST (UTC+2)	Šehić (yellow card) 3'; Papadopulos (yellow card) 11' (goal) 27'; Bartošák (yellow card) 21'; Svoboda 56'; D.Stropek (yellow card) 78'; Zych 90+1'	Report	Schranz 35'; Ousou (yellow card) 39'; Kacharaba 45'; Traoré 64' (yellow card) 73'; Ekpai (yellow card) 83'	Stadium: Městský stadion Attendance: 3,680; Referee: Pavel Julínek

12 September 2021 7	Slavia Prague	2–1	1. FC Slovácko	Prague
19:00 CEST (UTC+2)	Samek 4'; Tecl 68'	Report	Petržela (yellow card) 17'; F.Vecheta (yellow card) 79' (goal) 90'	Stadium: Sinobo Stadium; Attendance: 11,252; Referee: Pavel Orel

19 September 2021 8	Bohemians 1905	1–5	Slavia Prague	Prague
19:00 CEST (UTC+2)	Chramosta 22'; J.Vondra (yellow card) 35'; Hronek (yellow card) 61'	Report	Stanciu 56' (pen.); Lingr 62'; Kuchta 65' (yellow card) 66'; Krmenčík 72' (pen.); Schranz 76'	Stadium: Ďolíček; Attendance: 5,485; Referee: Ondřej Berka

26 September 2021 9	Slavia Prague	4–1	Hradec Králové	Prague
19:00 CEST (UTC+2)	Kuchta 7', 50'; Samek 40'; Traoré 60'	Report	Rada (yellow card) 45+1'; O.Urma (yellow card) 65'; J.Mejdr (yellow card) 86'; J.Kateřiňák 90+1'; Král (yellow card) 90+3'	Stadium: Sinobo Stadium; Attendance: 10,213; Referee: Jan Petřík

3 October 2021 10	Sparta Prague	1–0	Slavia Prague	Prague
19:00 CEST (UTC+2)	Pavelka (yellow card) 38'; Haraslín 42'; Dočkal (yellow card) 73'; Sáček (yellow card) 83'; Niță (yellow card) 90+3'	Report	Ousou (yellow card) 28' (yellow-red card) 41'; Kuchta (yellow card) 45'; Krmenčík (yellow card) 78'; Bah (yellow card) 82'; Traoré (yellow card) 90+5'; Bořil (yellow card) FT	Stadium: Stadion Letná; Attendance: 17,093; Referee: Ondřej Berka

16 October 2021 11	Slavia Prague	3–1	Slovan Liberec	Prague
19:00 CEST (UTC+2)	Bah 43'; Stanciu (yellow card) 49'; Schranz (yellow card) 58'; Kuchta 67'; Olayinka 81'; Ekpai (yellow card) 90+2'	Report	Stoch 73' (yellow card) 86'	Stadium: Sinobo Stadium; Attendance: 12,462; Referee: Pavel Franěk

24 October 2021 12	Dynamo České Budějovice	2–2	Slavia Prague	České Budějovice
16:00 CEST (UTC+2)	Brandner 10'; L.Havel 14' (yellow card) 29'; P.Čavoš (yellow card) 73'; Skovajsa (red card) 77'; Vorel (yellow card) 89'	Report	Traoré (yellow card) 31'; Olayinka 52' (pen.); Dorley 59'	Stadium: Stadion Střelecký ostrov Attendance: 6,289; Referee: Jan Machálek

27 October 2021 3	Slavia Prague	1–0	Sigma Olomouc	Prague
19:00 CEST (UTC+2)	Olayinka 5'; Hromada (yellow card) 51'; Mandous (yellow card) 90+4'	Report	Jemelka (yellow card) 34'; Hála (yellow card) 90'	Stadium: Sinobo Stadium; Attendance: 11,368; Referee: Ladislav Szikszay

31 October 2021 13	Slavia Prague	2–0	Viktoria Plzeň	Prague
18 CET (UTC+1)	Ekpai (yellow card) 48'; Lingr 65'; Krmenčík (yellow card) 90+3' (goal) 90+5'	Report	Řezník (red card) 11'; Kalvach (yellow card) 26'; Mosquera (yellow card) 58' (yellow-red card) 90+1'; Pernica (red card) 81'	Stadium: Sinobo Stadium; Attendance: 18,179; Referee: Pavel Franěk

7 November 2021 14	Pardubice	0–5	Slavia Prague	Prague (Note: Pardubice continued playing their home matches in Ďolíček due to the rebuilding of their own stadium Pod Vinicí.)
15:00 CET (UTC+1)	S.Šimek (yellow card) 17'; Cadu (yellow card) 33'	Report	Krmenčík 58', 63'; Lingr 64', 75'; Ekpai 81'	Stadium: Ďolíček; Attendance: 3,492; Referee: Jan Petřík

21 November 2021 15	Slavia Prague	5–0	Jablonec	Prague
18:00 CET (UTC+1)	Olayinka 15'; Kuchta 33'; Bah 40'; Lingr 77', 90+1'; Dorley (yellow card) 78'	Report	Čvančara (yellow card) 33'; Hübschman (yellow card) 82'	Stadium: Sinobo Stadium; Attendance: 10,145; Referee: Dalibor Černý

28 November 2021 16	Slavia Prague	3–0	Teplice	Prague
15:00 CET (UTC+1)	Kacharaba (yellow card) 7'; Stanciu 16'; Kuchta 42'; Ousou 84'	Report	Rezek (yellow card) 15'; Shejbal (yellow card) 37'; Mareček (red card) 59'; Fortelný (yellow card) 70'	Stadium: Sinobo Stadium; Attendance: 1,000; Referee: Jan Machálek

4 December 2021 17	Sigma Olomouc	0–1	Slavia Prague	Olomouc
18:00 CET (UTC+1)	Hubník (yellow card) 52'; Greššák (yellow card) 71'	Report	Kuchta 56'; Kacharaba (yellow card) 89'; Mandous (yellow card) 90+5'; Krmenčík (yellow card) 90+7'	Stadium: Andrův stadion Attendance: 1,000; Referee: Miroslav Zelinka

12 December 2021 18	Slavia Prague	2–0	Mladá Boleslav	Prague
15:00 CET (UTC+1)	Bah 31'; Stanciu 40'	Report	D.Jurásek (yellow card) 27'; Suchý (yellow card) 57'	Stadium: Sinobo Stadium; Attendance: 1,000; Referee: Petr Hocek

19 December 2021 19	Baník Ostrava	3–3	Slavia Prague	Ostrava
18:00 CET (UTC+1)	Svozil (yellow card) 40'; Almási 47', 82' (pen.); Klíma (yellow card) 57'; Kaloč 70'	Report	Dorley (yellow card) 15' (red card) 51'; Schranz 24'; Holeš 29', 88'; Masopust (yellow card) 40'; Kuchta (red card) 81'	Stadium: Městský stadion Attendance: 1,000; Referee: Dalibor Černý

5 February 2022 20	Slavia Prague	0–1	Karviná	Prague
15:00 CET (UTC+1)	Schranz (yellow card) 48'; Bah (yellow card) 53'; Ousou (yellow card) 89'	Report	Čmelík (yellow card) 28'; Jánoš (yellow card) 47'; R.Durosinmi 69' (yellow card) 85'; R.Látal (yellow card) 84'; Bartošák (yellow card) 89'	Stadium: Sinobo Stadium; Attendance: 1,000; Referee: Tomáš Batík

13 February 2022 21	1. FC Slovácko	0–1	Slavia Prague	Uherské Hradiště
15:00 CET (UTC+1)	Petržela (yellow card) 57'; Šimko (yellow card) 64'; Šašinka (yellow card) 90+3'	Report	D.Jurásek (yellow card) 40'; Lingr 44'; Hromada (yellow card) 89'; Schranz (yellow card) 90+5'	Stadium: Městský fotbalový stadion Miroslava Valenty; Attendance: 1,000; Referee: Dalibor Černý

20 February 2022 22	Slavia Prague	1–0	Bohemians 1905	Prague
18:00 CET (UTC+1)	Olayinka 43'; Samek (yellow card) 65'	Report	D.Puškáč (yellow card) 32'; Köstl (yellow card) 65'; Vaníček (yellow card) 65'	Stadium: Sinobo Stadium; Attendance: 9,682; Referee: Jan Machálek

27 February 2022 23	Hradec Králové	1–5	Slavia Prague	Hradec Králové
15:00 CET (UTC+1)	Kučera (yellow card) 29'; Rybička 90+1'	Report	Hromada 2'; Lingr 12', 70' (yellow card) 60'; Tecl 22', 30'; Samek (yellow card) 62'	Stadium: Všesportovní stadion Attendance: 2,514; Referee: Tomas Klíma

6 March 2022 24	Slavia Prague	2–0	Sparta Prague	Prague
18:00 CET (UTC+1)	Lingr 41'; Bah (yellow card) 44'; Traoré (yellow card) 45+2'; D.Jurásek (yellow card) 52'; Holeš (yellow card) 62'; Olayinka (yellow card) 72'; Schranz 90+2'	Report	Krejčí (yellow card) 14'; Pešek (yellow card) 45+2'; Karabec (yellow card) 62'; Krejčí (yellow card) 70'	Stadium: Sinobo Stadium; Attendance: 19,370; Referee: Szymon Marciniak

13 March 2022 25	Slovan Liberec	1–0	Slavia Prague	Liberec
15:00 CET (UTC+1)	Olayinka 14' (o.g.); Štetina (red card) 20'; Mikula (yellow card) 45'; Frýdek (yellow card) 52'; Višinský (yellow card) 76'	Report	Olayinka (yellow card) 59'; Schranz (yellow card) 64'; Plavšić (yellow card) 75'; Bah (yellow card) 84'	Stadium: Stadion u Nisy; Attendance: 6,123; Referee: Petr Hocek

20 March 2022 26	Slavia Prague	1–0	Dynamo České Budějovice	Prague
18:00 CET (UTC+1)	Lingr 58'; Talovyerov (yellow card) 78' (yellow-red card) 86'	Report	Škoda (yellow card) 53'; Hellebrand (yellow card) 88'; Valenta (yellow card) 88'	Stadium: Sinobo Stadium; Attendance: 10,673; Referee: Miroslav Zelinka

3 April 2022 27	Viktoria Plzeň	1–1	Slavia Prague	Plzeň
19:00 CEST (UTC+2)	Sýkora (yellow card) 8'; Kopic (yellow card) 45+1'; Bucha (yellow card) 60' (yellow-red card) 85'	Report	Lingr 48' (yellow card) 61'; Holeš (yellow card) 74'	Stadium: Doosan Arena; Attendance: 11,384; Referee: Paweł Raczkowski

10 April 2022 28	Slavia Prague	4–0	Pardubice	Prague
19:00 CEST (UTC+2)	Provod (yellow card) 22' (goal) 41' (pen.), 54'; Schranz 62'; Ousou (yellow card) 81'; Traoré 84'	Report	V.Patrák (yellow card) 57'	Stadium: Sinobo Stadium; Attendance: 10,386; Referee: Dalibor Černý

17 April 2022 29	Jablonec	1–2	Slavia Prague	Jablonec nad Nisou
17:00 CEST (UTC+2)	Černák (yellow card) 10'; Pilař (yellow card) 28'; Silný (yellow card) 67'; Krob 87' (yellow card) 90+4'; J.Martinec (yellow card) 90+3'	Report	Schranz 31' (yellow card) 90+3'; Fila (yellow card) 43'; Tecl 84' (yellow card) 90+3'; Kolář (yellow card) 90+6'	Stadium: Stadion Střelnice; Attendance: 4,056; Referee: Petr Hocek

20 April 2022 30	Slavia Prague	3–0	Fastav Zlín	Prague
18:00 CEST (UTC+2)	Tecl 32'; Provod 36'; Olayinka 64'	Report	Chanturishvili (yellow card) 28'	Stadium: Sinobo Stadium; Attendance: 9,251; Referee: Miroslav Zelinka

==== Championship group ====
===== League table =====
Pos	Team	Pld	W	D	L	GF	GA	GD	Pts	Qualification or relegation
1	Viktoria Plzeň (C)	35	26	7	2	63	21	+42	85	Qualification for the Champions League second qualifying round
2	Slavia Prague	35	24	6	5	80	27	+53	78	Qualification for the Europa Conference League second qualifying round
3	Sparta Prague	35	22	7	6	72	40	+32	73	Qualification for the Europa Conference League second qualifying round
4	Slovácko	35	21	5	9	59	38	+21	68	Qualification to Europa League third qualifying round (Note: Slovácko qualified for the Europa League as Czech Cup winners.)
5	Baník Ostrava	35	15	10	10	60	48	+12	55	
6	Hradec Králové	35	10	14	11	44	52	−8	44	

Source: Fortuna Liga
Rules for classification: 1) Total points; 2) Points earned in regular season; 3) Head-to-head points (regular season); 4) Head-to-head goal difference (regular season); 5) Head-to-head goals scored (regular season); 5) Goal difference (all matches); 6) Goals scored (all matches); 7) Fair-play ranking; 8) Draw.
(C) Champions

===== Results summary =====
Overall								Home						Away					
Pld	W	D	L	GF	GA	GD	Pts	W	D	L	GF	GA	GD	W	D	L	GF	GA	GD
5	1	2	2	9	8	+1	5	1	1	1	5	3	+2	0	1	1	4	5	−1

Last updated: 15 May 2022.
Source: See results

===== Results by round =====
Round	1	2	3	4	5
Ground	A	H	H	A	H
Result	L	D	W	D	L
Position	2	2	2	2	2

Updated to match(es) played on 15 May 2022. Source: See results
A = Away; H = Home; W = Win; D = Draw; L = Loss

===== Results =====
24 April 2022 31	Hradec Králové	4–3	Slavia Prague	Hradec Králové
19:00 CEST (UTC+2)	D.Vašulín 13' (pen.); Kubala 34'; Kučera 35' (yellow card) 47'; A.Vlkanova 58'; M.Leibl (yellow card) 90+6'	Report	Hovorka (yellow card) 12'; D.Jurásek 19'; Fila 40'; Kúdela 73'; Talovyerov (yellow card) 90+6'	Stadium: Všesportovní stadion Attendance: 2,907; Referee: Ladislav Szikszay

1 May 2022 32	Slavia Prague	1–1	Viktoria Plzeň	Prague
19:00 CEST (UTC+2)	Kúdela 90+1' (pen.); Provod (yellow card) 90+2'; Hovorka (yellow card) 90+4'	Report	Havel (yellow card) 14'; Kopic (yellow card) 64'; Staněk (yellow card) 90'; Beauguel 90+5' (pen.)	Stadium: Sinobo Stadium; Attendance: 18,732; Referee: Bartosz Frankowski

8 May 2022 33	Slavia Prague	3–0	1. FC Slovácko	Prague
19:00 CEST (UTC+2)	Plavšić 29'; Traoré 75' (yellow card) 81'; Lingr 84' (yellow card) 85'	Report		Stadium: Sinobo Stadium; Attendance: 13,119; Referee: Miroslav Zelinka

11 May 2022 34	Baník Ostrava	1–1	Slavia Prague	Ostrava
19:00 CEST (UTC+2)	D.Buchta 32'; Kaloč (yellow card) 40'; Pokorný (yellow card) 44'; Almási (yellow card) 60'; Ndefe (yellow card) 62'; Laštůvka (yellow card) 85'	Report	Sor 5'; Hromada (yellow card) 40'; Holeš (yellow card) 77'	Stadium: Městský stadion Attendance: 8,728; Referee: Petr Hocek

15 May 2022 35	Slavia Prague	1–2	Sparta Prague	Prague
17:00 CEST (UTC+2)	Traoré (yellow card) 32'; Ševčík 39'; Hovorka (yellow card) 45+1'; M.Usor (yellow card) 90'; Talovyerov (yellow card) 90+1'; Plavšić (red card) 90+1'	Report	Pešek (yellow card) 13'; Čvančara 20'; Vitík (yellow card) 49'; Wiesner (yellow card) 59' (yellow-red card) 78'; Hložek 83'; Haraslín (yellow card) 90+1'	Stadium: Sinobo Stadium; Attendance: 18,131; Referee: Tomas Klíma

=== Czech Cup ===
22 September 2021 Third round	Slovan Velvary	2–4	Slavia Prague	Velvary
16:15 CEST (UTC+2)	L.Vopat 14'; T.Tenkl 40' (pen.); P.Valenta (yellow card) 67'; J.Chábera (yellow card) 73'; J.Moravec (yellow card) 90'	Report	F.Matys (yellow card) 40'; Stanciu 54', 60' (pen.), 90+1'; Traoré 56'	Stadium: Stadion TJ Slovan Velvary; Attendance: 2,700; Referee: Pavel Franek

15 December 2021 Round of 16	Slavia Prague	3–1	Fastav Zlín	Prague
17:00 CET (UTC+1)	F.Horský 9'; Madsen 53'; Olayinka 90+1' (pen.)	Report	D.Tkáč 2' (yellow card) 51'; Reiter (yellow card) 20'; Hlinka (yellow card) 67'; Conde (yellow card) 80'; J.Šiška (yellow card) 90'	Stadium: Sinobo Stadium; Referee: Jan Petřík

9 February 2022 Quarterfinal	Slavia Prague	0–2	Sparta Prague	Prague
17:00 CET (UTC+1)	Kacharaba (yellow card) 12' (yellow-red card) 86'; Schranz (yellow card) 28'	Report	M.Suchomel (yellow card) 6'; L.Krejčí II 10' (yellow card) 73'; Pešek 26'	Stadium: Sinobo Stadium; Referee: Pavel Orel

=== UEFA Champions League ===
==== Qualifying rounds ====
The draw for the third qualifying round was held on 19 July 2021.

4 August 2021 Third qualifying round 1st leg	Ferencváros (Hungary)	2–0	(Czech Republic) Slavia Prague	Budapest, Hungary
20:00 CEST (UTC+2)	Blažič (yellow card) 29'; Kacharaba 44' (o.g.); Kharatin 50' (pen.)	Report	Plavšić (yellow card) 45+1'; Dorley (yellow card) 88'	Stadium: Ferencváros Stadion; Attendance: 17,127; Referee: Jesús Gil Manzano (Spain)

10 August 2021 Third qualifying round 2nd leg	Slavia Prague (Czech Republic)	1–0 (1–2 agg.)	(Hungary) Ferencváros	Prague, Czech Republic
19:00 CEST (UTC+2)	Masopust 36'; Dorley (yellow card) 40'; Traoré (yellow card) 84'	Report	Kharatin (yellow card) 24'; Zachariassen (yellow card) 32'; Uzuni (yellow card) 58'; Ćivić (yellow card) 79' (yellow-red card) 84'; Kovačević (yellow card) 85'; Mmaee (yellow card) 90+4'	Stadium: Sinobo Stadium; Attendance: 15,238; Referee: Tobias Stieler (Germany)

=== UEFA Europa League ===
==== Qualifying rounds ====
The draw for the play-off round was held on 2 August 2021.

19 August 2021 Play-off round 1st leg	Slavia Prague (Czech Republic)	2–2	(Poland) Legia Warsaw	Prague, Czech Republic
19:00 CEST (UTC+2)	Dorley (yellow card) 26'; Bah 33'; Masopust 45+3'; Traoré (yellow card) 53'	Report	Luquinhas (yellow card) 12'; Emreli 20'; Rose (yellow card) 36'; Juranović 37'	Stadium: Sinobo Stadium; Attendance: 14,543; Referee: Felix Zwayer (Germany)

26 August 2021 Play-off round 2nd leg	Legia Warsaw (Poland)	2–1 (4–3 agg.)	(Czech Republic) Slavia Prague	Warsaw, Poland
21:00 CEST (UTC+2)	Hołownia (yellow card) 30'; Mladenović (yellow card) 44'; Emreli 59', 70'; Lopes (yellow card) 75'	Report	Holeš (red card) 3'; Ekpai 45' (yellow card) 73'; Kúdela (yellow card) 82'; Bořil (yellow card) 88'; Hromada (red card) 90+5'	Stadium: Stadion Wojska Polskiego; Attendance: 20,641; Referee: Artur Soares Dias (Portugal)

=== UEFA Europa Conference League ===
==== Group stage ====
Pos	Team	Pld	W	D	L	GF	GA	GD	Pts	Qualification
1	(Netherlands) Feyenoord	6	4	2	0	11	6	+5	14	Advance to round of 16
2	(Czech Republic) Slavia Prague	6	2	2	2	8	7	+1	8	Advance to knockout round play-offs
3	(Germany) Union Berlin	6	2	1	3	8	9	−1	7	
4	(Israel) Maccabi Haifa	6	1	1	4	2	7	−5	4	

Source: UEFA
Rules for classification: Group stage tiebreakers

16 September 2021 1	Slavia Prague (Czech Republic)	3–1	(Germany) Union Berlin	Prague, Czech Republic
18:45 CEST (UTC+2)	Bah 18'; Ekpai (yellow card) 25'; Traoré (yellow card) 34'; Stanciu (yellow card) 72'; Kuchta 84'; Schranz 88'	Report	Jaeckel (yellow card) 6' (yellow-red card) 39'; Awoniyi (yellow card) 15'; Behrens 70'	Stadium: Sinobo Stadium; Attendance: 15,286; Referee: Fábio Veríssimo (Portugal)

30 September 2021 2	Feyenoord (Netherlands)	2–1	(Czech Republic) Slavia Prague	Rotterdam, Netherlands
21:00 CEST (UTC+2)	Kökçü 14'; Linssen 24'; Malacia (yellow card) 62'; Aursnes (yellow card) 73'; Toornstra (yellow card) 83'; Til (yellow card) 87'	Report	Holeš 63'; Traoré (yellow card) 64'; Bah (yellow card) 77'; Kuchta (yellow card) 79'	Stadium: De Kuip; Attendance: 38,505; Referee: Radu Petrescu (Romania)

21 October 2021 3	Maccabi Haifa (Israel)	1–0	(Czech Republic) Slavia Prague	Haifa, Israel
18:45 CEST (UTC+2)	Goldberg (yellow card) 9'; Donyoh 24'; Tawatha (yellow card) 40'; Cohen (yellow card) 71'; Menahem (yellow card) 90+6'	Report	Bah (yellow card) 44'; Samek (yellow card) 90+1'	Stadium: Sammy Ofer Stadium; Attendance: 10,000; Referee: Ádám Farkas (Hungary)

4 November 2021 4	Slavia Prague (Czech Republic)	1–0	(Israel) Maccabi Haifa	Prague, Czech Republic
21:00 CET (UTC+1)	Masopust (yellow card) 8'; Kuchta 49' (yellow card) 63'; Dorley (yellow card) 53'; Kacharaba (yellow card) 88'; Ševčík (yellow card) 90+2'; Mandous (yellow card) 90+2'	Report	Menahem (yellow card) 32'; Chery (yellow card) 49'; Cohen (yellow card) 50'; Atzili (yellow card) 88'; Planić (yellow card) 90'	Stadium: Sinobo Stadium; Attendance: 13,646; Referee: Kai Erik Steen (Norway)

25 November 2021 5	Slavia Prague (Czech Republic)	2–2	(Netherlands) Feyenoord	Prague, Czech Republic
18:45 CET (UTC+1)	Olayinka 12'; Ousou (yellow card) 27'; Krmenčík (yellow card) 38'; Masopust (yellow card) 39'; Ševčík (yellow card) 63'; Kuchta 66' (yellow card) 68'; Kacharaba (yellow card) 89'	Report	Dessers 31', 90+3' (yellow card) 89'; Til (red card) 37'; Malacia (yellow card) 72'; Kökçü (yellow card) 89'; João Carlos Teixeira (yellow card) 90+3'	Stadium: Sinobo Stadium; Attendance: 14,562; Referee: Mattias Gestranius (Finland)

9 December 2021 6	Union Berlin (Germany)	1–1	(Czech Republic) Slavia Prague	Berlin, Germany
21:00 CET (UTC+1)	Becker (yellow card) 32'; Awoniyi (yellow card) 54'; Kruse 64'	Report	Bah (yellow card) 47'; Schranz 50'; Ousou (yellow card) 54'; Mandous (yellow card) 90+5'	Stadium: Olympiastadion; Attendance: 4,380; Referee: Rade Obrenović (Slovenia)

==== Knockout phase ====
The draw for the knockout round play-offs was held on 13 December 2021.

17 February 2022 Knockout round play-offs 1st leg	Fenerbahçe (Turkey)	2–3	(Czech Republic) Slavia Prague	Istanbul, Turkey
19:45 CET (UTC+1)	Zajc (yellow card) 7'; Pelkas 58'; Szalai (yellow card) 61'; Kadıoğlu 83'	Report	Traoré 45'; Dorley (yellow card) 52' (goal) 62'; Lingr 64'	Stadium: Şükrü Saracoğlu Stadium; Attendance: 30,094; Referee: Maurizio Mariani (Italy)

24 February 2022 Knockout round play-offs 1st leg	Slavia Prague (Czech Republic)	3–2 (6–4 agg.)	(Turkey) Fenerbahçe	Prague, Czech Republic
21:00 CET (UTC+1)	Schranz 19'; Kacharaba (yellow card) 21'; Sor 27', 63'; Dorley (yellow card) 90+3'	Report	Yandaş (yellow card) 31' (goal) 39'; Osayi-Samuel (yellow card) 31'; Pelkas (yellow card) 42'; Berisha 90'	Stadium: Sinobo Stadium; Attendance: 10,120; Referee: Chris Kavanagh (England)

The round of 16 draw was held on 25 February 2022.

10 March 2022 Round of 16 1st leg	Slavia Prague (Czech Republic)	4–1	(Austria) LASK	Prague, Czech Republic
18:45 CET (UTC+1)	Sor 3', 29'; Plavšić (yellow card) 39'; Olayinka 83'; Traoré 85'	Report	Potzmann (yellow card) 33'; Michorl (yellow card) 54'; Balić 67'	Stadium: Sinobo Stadium; Attendance: 16,754; Referee: Andris Treimanis (Latvia)

17 March 2022 Round of 16 2nd leg	LASK (Austria)	4–3 (5–7 agg.)	(Czech Republic) Slavia Prague	Sankt Pölten, Austria
18:45 CET (UTC+1)	Wiesinger (yellow card) 12' (goal) 36', 76'; Horvath (yellow card) 39'; Gruber 88'; Schmidt (yellow card) 67' (goal) 89'	Report	Olayinka 24'; Lingr (yellow card) 28'; Ousou (yellow card) 35' (yellow-red card) 42'; Bah 37'; Sor (yellow card) 53' (goal) 62'; Plavšić (red card) 85'	Stadium: NV Arena; Attendance: 5,403; Referee: Lawrence Visser (Belgium)
Note: LASK played their home match at NV Arena, Sankt Pölten, instead of their regular stadium Linzer Stadion, Linz, due to renovation.

The draw for the quarter-finals was held on 18 March 2022.

7 April 2022 Quarterfinal 1st leg	Feyenoord (Netherlands)	3–3	(Czech Republic) Slavia Prague	Rotterdam, Netherlands
18:45 CEST (UTC+2)	Sinisterra 10' (yellow card) 84'; Trauner (yellow card) 20'; Pedersen (yellow card) 43'; Marciano (yellow card) 45+2'; Senesi (yellow card) 53' (goal) 74'; Kökçü 86'	Report	Olayinka 41' (yellow card) 45+2'; Talovyerov (yellow card) 57'; Sor 67'; Schranz (yellow card) 85'; Traoré 90+5'	Stadium: De Kuip; Attendance: 42,163; Referee: Halil Umut Meler (Turkey)

14 April 2022 Quarterfinal 2nd leg	Slavia Prague (Czech Republic)	1–3 (4–6 agg.)	(Netherlands) Feyenoord	Prague, Czech Republic
21:00 CEST (UTC+2)	Traoré 14' (yellow card) 80'; Kacharaba (red card) 90+4'	Report	Dessers 2', 59'; Kökçü (yellow card) 40'; Sinisterra 78'	Stadium: Sinobo Stadium; Attendance: 19,370; Referee: Deniz Aytekin (Germany)

== Squad statistics ==
As of match played 15 May 2022

=== Appearances and goals ===
No.	Pos	Nat	Player	Total		First League		Czech Cup		Champions League		Europa League		Europa Conference League	
No.	Pos	Nat	Player	Apps	Goals	Apps	Goals	Apps	Goals	Apps	Goals	Apps	Goals	Apps	Goals
1	GK	(Czech Republic) CZE	Ondřej Kolář	21	0	15	0	0	0	2	0	2	0	2	0
2	DF	(Czech Republic) CZE	David Hovorka	8	0	8	0	0	0	0	0	0	0	0	0
3	DF	(Czech Republic) CZE	Tomáš Holeš	42	3	24+3	2	1+1	0	2	0	2	0	8+1	1
4	DF	(Sweden) SWE	Aiham Ousou	38	1	24+1	1	2	0	0	0	0	0	11	0
5	DF	(Denmark) DEN	Alexander Bah	41	7	26	3	1	0	2	0	1	2	11	2
6	DF	(Ukraine) UKR	Maksym Talovyerov	16	0	2+9	0	0	0	0	0	0	0	4+1	0
8	MF	(Czech Republic) CZE	Lukáš Masopust	30	2	14+4	0	1+1	0	2	1	1	1	5+2	0
9	FW	(Nigeria) NGR	Peter Olayinka	40	11	19+5	6	2+1	1	1+1	0	0+1	0	10	4
10	MF	(Serbia) SRB	Srđan Plavšić	37	1	11+13	1	2+1	0	0+1	0	0	0	5+4	0
11	FW	(Czech Republic) CZE	Stanislav Tecl	33	6	11+9	6	1+1	0	1	0	1+1	0	2+6	0
13	MF	(Czech Republic) CZE	Daniel Samek	28	3	11+8	3	2	0	0	0	0+1	0	2+4	0
14	FW	(Czech Republic) CZE	Daniel Fila	12	1	3+9	1	0	0	0	0	0	0	0	0
15	DF	(Czech Republic) CZE	Ondřej Kúdela	17	3	10+3	3	0	0	0	0	1	0	1+2	0
17	MF	(Czech Republic) CZE	Lukáš Provod	6	3	5+1	3	0	0	0	0	0	0	0	0
18	DF	(Czech Republic) CZE	Jan Bořil	6	0	5	0	0	0	0	0	1	0	0	0
19	MF	(Liberia) LBR	Oscar Dorley	38	2	18+5	1	2	0	2	0	1	0	10	1
20	FW	(Nigeria) NGR	Yira Sor	17	7	5+5	1	0+1	0	0	0	0	0	6	6
21	MF	(Denmark) DEN	Mads Madsen	17	1	2+10	0	2+1	1	0	0	0	0	1+1	0
22	FW	(Czech Republic) CZE	Michael Krmenčík	21	4	4+10	4	1+1	0	0	0	0+1	0	0+4	0
23	MF	(Czech Republic) CZE	Petr Ševčík	24	1	11+5	1	1	0	1	0	0	0	4+2	0
25	MF	(Slovakia) SVK	Jakub Hromada	26	1	18+4	1	1	0	1	0	2	0	0	0
26	FW	(Slovakia) SVK	Ivan Schranz	44	13	22+7	10	1	0	1+1	0	2	0	8+2	3
27	MF	(Ivory Coast) CIV	Ibrahim Traoré	48	9	11+18	4	1+2	1	0+2	0	1+1	0	9+3	4
28	GK	(Czech Republic) CZE	Aleš Mandous	32	0	20	0	2	0	0	0	0	0	10	0
30	DF	(Ukraine) UKR	Taras Kacharaba	34	1	20+1	1	2	0	2	0	0	0	9	0
31	GK	(Czech Republic) CZE	Přemysl Kovář	1	0	0+1	0	0	0	0	0	0	0	0	0
32	MF	(Czech Republic) CZE	Ondřej Lingr	48	15	19+12	14	3	0	0+1	0	0+2	0	6+5	1
33	MF	(Czech Republic) CZE	David Jurásek	11	1	9+2	1	0	0	0	0	0	0	0	0
35	FW	(Czech Republic) CZE	Daniel Šmiga	1	0	0+1	0	0	0	0	0	0	0	0	0
Slavia Prague B Players:
33	MF	(Czech Republic) CZE	Adam Pudil	1	0	0	0	0	0	0	0	0	0	0+1	0
34	GK	(Czech Republic) CZE	Antonín Kinský	1	0	0	0	1	0	0	0	0	0	0	0
35	DF	(Czech Republic) CZE	Milos Pudil	1	0	0	0	0	0	0	0	0	0	1	0
35	FW	(Nigeria) NGR	Moses Usor	1	0	0+1	0	0	0	0	0	0	0	0	0
44	FW	(Czech Republic) CZE	Erik Biegon	1	0	0	0	0+1	0	0	0	0	0	0	0
Players away from Slavia Prague on loan:
6	DF	(Czech Republic) CZE	Frantisek Matys	1	0	0	0	1	0	0	0	0	0	0	0
14	FW	(Netherlands) NED	Mick van Buren	3	0	0+3	0	0	0	0	0	0	0	0	0
14	FW	(Czech Republic) CZE	Filip Horský	2	1	0	0	1	1	0	0	0	0	0+1	0
20	MF	(Nigeria) NGR	Ubong Ekpai	22	2	7+5	1	1+1	0	0	0	1+1	1	2+4	0
24	MF	(Czech Republic) CZE	Laco Takács	1	0	0	0	0	0	0	0	0	0	0+1	0
33	FW	(Croatia) CRO	Petar Musa	4	0	1+1	0	0	0	0+2	0	0	0	0	0
Players who left Slavia Prague during the season:
6	DF	(Czech Republic) CZE	David Zima	7	0	2+2	0	0	0	1	0	2	0	0	0
7	MF	(Romania) ROU	Nicolae Stanciu	27	6	12+4	3	1+1	3	2	0	2	0	3+2	0
12	FW	(Senegal) SEN	Abdallah Sima	6	0	1+2	0	0	0	0+1	0	1+1	0	0	0
16	FW	(Czech Republic) CZE	Jan Kuchta	24	12	13+3	9	0+1	0	0+1	0	0+1	0	2+3	3

=== Goal scorers ===
Place	Position	Nation	Number	Name	HET liga	MOL Cup	Champions League	Europa League	Europa Conference League	Total
1	MF	(Czech Republic)	32	Ondřej Lingr	14	0	0	0	1	15
2	FW	(Slovakia)	26	Ivan Schranz	10	0	0	0	3	13
3	FW	(Czech Republic)	16	Jan Kuchta	9	0	0	0	3	12
4	FW	(Nigeria)	9	Peter Olayinka	6	1	0	0	4	11
5	MF	(Ivory Coast)	27	Ibrahim Traoré	4	1	0	0	4	9
6	MF	(Nigeria)	20	Yira Sor	1	0	0	0	6	7
7	FW	(Czech Republic)	11	Stanislav Tecl	6	0	0	0	0	6
7	MF	(Romania)	7	Nicolae Stanciu	3	3	0	0	0	6
7	DF	(Denmark)	5	Alexander Bah	3	0	0	1	2	6
10	FW	(Czech Republic)	22	Michael Krmenčík	4	0	0	0	0	4
11	DF	(Czech Republic)	13	Daniel Samek	3	0	0	0	0	3
11	MF	(Czech Republic)	17	Lukáš Provod	3	0	0	0	0	3
11	DF	(Czech Republic)	15	Ondřej Kúdela	3	0	0	0	0	3
11	DF	(Czech Republic)	3	Tomáš Holeš	2	0	0	0	1	3
15	MF	(Nigeria)	20	Ubong Ekpai	1	0	0	1	0	2
15	MF	(Liberia)	19	Oscar Dorley	1	0	0	0	1	2
15	MF	(Czech Republic)	8	Lukáš Masopust	0	0	1	1	0	2
18	DF	(Ukraine)	30	Taras Kacharaba	1	0	0	0	0	1
18	DF	(Sweden)	4	Aiham Ousou	1	0	0	0	0	1
18	MF	(Slovakia)	25	Jakub Hromada	1	0	0	0	0	1
18	DF	(Czech Republic)	33	David Jurásek	1	0	0	0	0	1
18	FW	(Czech Republic)	14	Daniel Fila	1	0	0	0	0	1
18	MF	(Serbia)	10	Srđan Plavšić	1	0	0	0	0	1
18	MF	(Czech Republic)	23	Petr Ševčík	1	0	0	0	0	1
18	FW	(Czech Republic)	12	Filip Horský	0	1	0	0	0	1
18	MF	(Denmark)	21	Mads Madsen	0	1	0	0	0	1
				TOTALS	80	7	1	3	25	116

=== Clean sheets ===
Place	Position	Nation	Number	Name	HET liga	MOL Cup	Champions League	Europa League	Europa Conference League	Total
1	GK	(Czech Republic)	28	Aleš Mandous	10	0	0	0	1	11
2	GK	(Czech Republic)	1	Ondřej Kolář	7	0	1	0	0	8
3	GK	(Czech Republic)	31	Přemysl Kovář	1	0	0	0	0	1
				TOTALS	17	0	1	0	1	19

Kolář & Kovář both played in Slavia's 3-0 win against Fastav Zlín on 20 April 2022

=== Disciplinary record ===
Number	Nation	Position	Name	HET liga		MOL Cup		Champions League		Europa League		Europa Conference League		Total	
Number	Nation	Position	Name	Booked	Sent off (straight red)	Booked	Sent off (straight red)	Booked	Sent off (straight red)	Booked	Sent off (straight red)	Booked	Sent off (straight red)	Booked	Sent off (straight red)
1	(Czech Republic)	GK	Ondřej Kolář	1	0	0	0	0	0	0	0	0	0	1	0
2	(Czech Republic)	DF	David Hovorka	3	0	0	0	0	0	0	0	0	0	3	0
3	(Czech Republic)	DF	Tomáš Holeš	3	0	0	0	0	0	0	1	0	0	3	1
4	(Sweden)	DF	Aiham Ousou	5	1	0	0	0	0	0	0	4	1	9	2
5	(Denmark)	DF	Alexander Bah	4	0	0	0	0	0	0	0	3	0	7	0
6	(Ukraine)	DF	Maksym Talovyerov	4	1	0	0	0	0	0	0	1	0	5	1
8	(Czech Republic)	MF	Lukáš Masopust	1	0	0	0	0	0	0	0	2	0	3	0
9	(Nigeria)	FW	Peter Olayinka	2	0	0	0	0	0	0	0	1	0	3	0
10	(Serbia)	MF	Srđan Plavšić	1	1	0	0	1	0	0	0	1	1	3	2
11	(Czech Republic)	FW	Stanislav Tecl	1	0	0	0	0	0	0	0	0	0	1	0
13	(Czech Republic)	DF	Daniel Samek	2	0	0	0	0	0	0	0	1	0	3	0
14	(Czech Republic)	FW	Daniel Fila	1	0	0	0	0	0	0	0	0	0	1	0
15	(Czech Republic)	DF	Ondřej Kúdela	2	0	0	0	0	0	1	0	0	0	3	0
17	(Czech Republic)	MF	Lukáš Provod	2	0	0	0	0	0	0	0	0	0	2	0
18	(Czech Republic)	DF	Jan Bořil	1	0	0	0	0	0	1	0	0	0	2	0
19	(Liberia)	MF	Oscar Dorley	2	1	0	0	2	0	1	0	3	0	7	1
20	(Nigeria)	MF	Yira Sor	0	0	0	0	0	0	0	0	1	0	1	0
22	(Czech Republic)	FW	Michael Krmenčík	3	0	0	0	0	0	0	0	1	0	4	0
23	(Czech Republic)	MF	Petr Ševčík	1	0	0	0	0	0	0	0	2	0	3	0
25	(Slovakia)	MF	Jakub Hromada	5	0	0	0	0	0	0	1	0	0	5	1
26	(Slovakia)	FW	Ivan Schranz	5	0	1	0	0	0	0	0	1	0	7	0
27	(Ivory Coast)	MF	Ibrahim Traoré	6	0	0	0	1	0	1	0	3	0	11	0
28	(Czech Republic)	GK	Aleš Mandous	2	0	0	0	0	0	0	0	2	0	4	0
30	(Ukraine)	DF	Taras Kacharaba	3	0	2	1	0	0	0	0	3	1	8	2
32	(Czech Republic)	MF	Ondřej Lingr	3	0	0	0	0	0	0	0	1	0	4	0
33	(Czech Republic)	DF	David Jurásek	2	0	0	0	0	0	0	0	0	0	2	0
Slavia Prague B Players:
35	(Nigeria)	FW	Moses Usor	1	0	0	0	0	0	0	0	0	0	1	0
Players away on loan:
6	(Czech Republic)	DF	Frantisek Matys	0	0	1	0	0	0	0	0	0	0	1	0
20	(Nigeria)	MF	Ubong Ekpai	3	0	0	0	0	0	1	0	1	0	5	0
Players who left Slavia Prague during the season:
6	(Czech Republic)	DF	David Zima	1	0	0	0	0	0	0	0	0	0	1	0
7	(Romania)	MF	Nicolae Stanciu	1	0	0	0	0	0	0	0	1	0	2	0
16	(Czech Republic)	FW	Jan Kuchta	2	1	0	0	0	0	0	0	3	0	5	1
			TOTALS	73	5	4	1	4	0	5	2	35	3	121	11
