= Yira Sor =

Nigerian footballer (born 2000)

Personal information
- Full name: Yira Collins Sor
- Date of birth: 24 July 2000 (age 26)
- Place of birth: Lagos, Nigeria
- Height: 1.74 m (5 ft 9 in)
- Position: Winger

Team information
- Current team: Amedspor
- Number: 11

Youth career
- Family Love Academy

Senior career*
| Years | Team | Apps | (Gls) |
| 2018–2021 | 36 Lion | | |
| 2021–2022 | Baník Ostrava | 25 | (6) |
| 2022 | Slavia Prague | 13 | (1) |
| 2022–2026 | Genk | 91 | (14) |
| 2026– | Amedspor | 5 | (2) |

International career^{‡}
| 2019 | Nigeria U20 | 2 | (0) |
| 2026– | Nigeria | 1 | (0) |
- * Club domestic league appearances and goals as of 16 August 2026 ‡ National team caps and goals as of 31 March 2026

Yira Collins Sor (born 24 July 2000) is a Nigerian professional footballer who plays as a winger for Turkish Süper Lig club Amedspor and the Nigeria national team.

== Club career ==
Sor began his career at Port Harcourt-based Family Love Academy, before moving to 36 Lion in Lagos. In February 2021, Sor signed for Czech First League club Baník Ostrava.

On 21 January 2022, after three league goals and five assists during the first half of the 2021–22 season, Slavia Prague confirmed the signing of Sor on a contract until December 2026, with compatriot Ubong Ekpai being loaned to Baník Ostrava as part of the deal. On 24 February 2022, Sor scored his first goals for Slavia Prague, scoring twice in a 3–2 UEFA Europa Conference League win over Fenerbahçe. Sor scored two goals again in the Round of 16 of the competition in the first leg against LASK.

On 28 December 2022, Belgian club Genk announced the signing of Sor on a contract until the summer of 2027.

In August 2026, Sor joined newly promoted Turkish Süper Lig club Amedspor from Genk, signing a three-year contract. The move brought an end to his four-year spell with the Belgian club, where he made 72 league appearances and scored 13 goals.

== International career ==
Sor made two appearances for Nigeria's under-20's at the 2019 FIFA U-20 World Cup in Poland.

== Career statistics ==
=== Club ===
As of match played 19 May 2026

Appearances and goals by club, season and competition
| Club | Season | League | | | National cup (Note: Includes Czech Cup, Belgian Cup) | | Continental | | Other | | Total | |
| Club | Season | Division | Apps | Goals | Apps | Goals | Apps | Goals | Apps | Goals | Apps | Goals |
|---|---|---|---|---|---|---|---|---|---|---|---|---|
| Baník Ostrava | 2020–21 | Czech First League | 9 | 0 | 1 | 0 | — | | — | | 10 | 0 |
| Baník Ostrava | 2021–22 | Czech First League | 16 | 3 | 3 | 1 | — | | — | | 19 | 4 |
| Baník Ostrava | Total | | 25 | 3 | 4 | 1 | — | | — | | 29 | 4 |
| Slavia Prague | 2021–22 | Czech First League | 10 | 1 | 1 | 0 | 6 (Note: Appearances in UEFA Conference League) | 6 | — | | 17 | 7 |
| Slavia Prague | 2022–23 | Czech First League | 3 | 0 | 1 | 0 | 5 | 2 | — | | 9 | 2 |
| Slavia Prague | Total | | 13 | 1 | 2 | 0 | 11 | 8 | — | | 26 | 9 |
| Genk | 2022–23 | Belgian Pro League | 20 | 2 | 1 | 0 | — | | — | | 21 | 2 |
| Genk | 2023–24 | Belgian Pro League | 20 | 6 | 2 | 1 | 9 (Note: One appearance in UEFA Champions League, two appearances in UEFA Europa League, six appearances in UEFA Conference League) | 0 | — | | 31 | 7 |
| Genk | 2024–25 | Belgian Pro League | 24 | 2 | 0 | 0 | — | | — | | 24 | 2 |
| Genk | 2025–26 | Belgian Pro League | 27 | 3 | 2 | 0 | 13 (Note: Appearances in UEFA Europa League) | 2 | — | | 42 | 5 |
| Genk | Total | | 81 | 13 | 5 | 1 | 22 | 2 | — | | 108 | 16 |
| Career total | | | 129 | 17 | 11 | 2 | 33 | 10 | 0 | 0 | 173 | 29 |

=== International ===
As of match played 31 March 2026

Appearances and goals by national team and year
| National team | Year | Apps | Goals |
|---|---|---|---|
| Nigeria | 2026 | 1 | 0 |
| Total | | 1 | 0 |
