= Ubong Ekpai =

Nigerian footballer (born 1995)

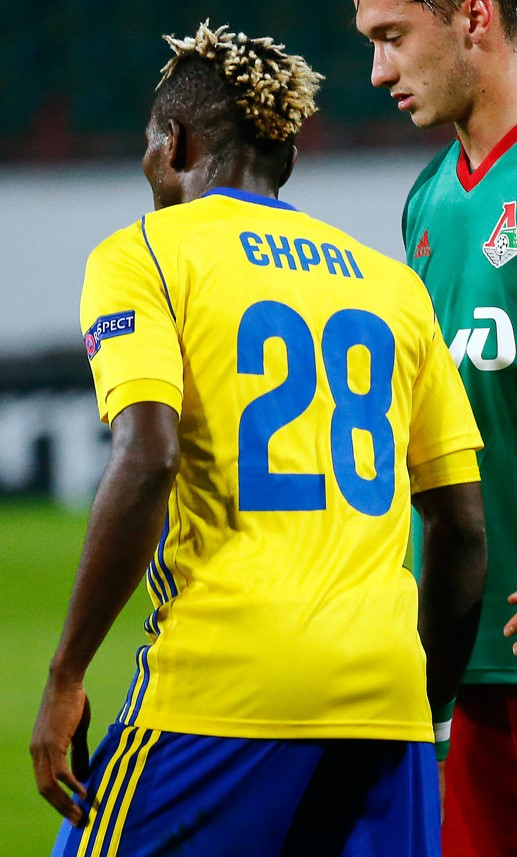
- Ekpai with Zlín in 2017

Personal information
- Full name: Ubong Moses Ekpai
- Date of birth: 17 October 1995 (age 31)
- Place of birth: Uyo, Nigeria
- Height: 1.76 m (5 ft 9 in)
- Position: Midfielder

Team information
- Current team: Zápy

Senior career*
Years	Team	Apps	(Gls)
- Akwa
2014–2015	Kano Pillars	18	(7)
2016	Akwa	13	(6)
2016–2017	Maccabi Haifa	0	(0)
2016–2017	→ Slovan Liberec (loan)	16	(4)
2017–2018	Zlín	28	(7)
2018–2021	Viktoria Plzeň	12	(0)
2019	→ České Budějovice (loan)	5	(1)
2020	→ České Budějovice (loan)	10	(0)
2021–2023	Slavia Prague	12	(1)
2021	→ Slavia Prague B	1	(1)
2022	→ Baník Ostrava (loan)	7	(0)
2022–2023	→ Mladá Boleslav (loan)	12	(0)
2024	Liria Prizren	15	(2)
2024–2025	České Budějovice	24	(1)
2026–	Zápy	0	(0)
- * Club domestic league appearances and goals as of 17 June 2025

Ubong Moses Ekpai (born 17 October 1995) is a Nigerian professional footballer who plays as a midfielder for Bohemian Football League club Zápy.

== Career ==
Ekpai left his home town club Akwa United to join Kano Pillars. After the 2016 season he returned to Akwa United, but was quickly signed by Maccabi Haifa of the Israeli Premier League and immediately sent on loan to the Czech First League side Slovan Liberec. He transferred to another Czech side Fastav Zlín in July 2017 for and undisclosed fee. After one year in Zlín, Ekpai was traded to Czech First League champion Viktoria Plzeň for an unspecified amount in May 2018.

On 23 June 2021, Ekpai signed for Czech champions Slavia Prague, following the expiry of his contract with Viktoria Plzeň. On 21 January 2022, as part of the deal to sign compatriot Yira Sor, Ekpai was loaned to follow Czech First League club Baník Ostrava. On 25 August 2022, Ekpai was loaned to follow Czech First League club Mladá Boleslav.

On 19 September 2024, Ekpai signed a one-year contract with Czech First League club České Budějovice.

On 25 August 2026, Ekpai signed a contract with Bohemian Football League club Zápy.

== Career statistics ==
As of 25 August 2023

Club	Season	League			Cup (Note: Includes Czech Cup)		Continental		Other		Total	
Club	Season	Division	Apps	Goals	Apps	Goals	Apps	Goals	Apps	Goals	Apps	Goals
Kano Pillars	2015	NPFL	18	7	—		2 (Note: Appearance(s) in CAF Champions League)	0	—		20	7
Akwa United	2016	NPFL	13	6	—		—		—		13	6
Slovan Liberec (loan)	2016–17	Czech First League	16	4	2	0	3 (Note: Appearance(s) in UEFA Europa League)	0	—		21	4
Zlín	2017–18	Czech First League	28	7	2	0	6	0	—		36	7
Viktoria Plzeň	2018–19	Czech First League	12	0	2	0	3 (Note: Two appearances in UEFA Champions League, one appearance in UEFA Europa League)	0	—		17	0
České Budějovice (loan)	2019–20	Czech First League	5	1	1	0	—		—		6	1
České Budějovice (loan)	2020–21	Czech First League	10	0	—		—		—		10	0
České Budějovice (loan)	Total		15	1	1	0	—		—		16	1
Slavia Prague	2021–22	Czech First League	12	1	2	0	8 (Note: Two appearances and one goal in UEFA Europa League, six appearances in UEFA Conference League)	1	—		22	2
Baník Ostrava (loan)	2021–22	Czech First League	7	0	—		—		—		7	0
Mladá Boleslav (loan)	2022–23	Czech First League	12	0	1	0	—		—		13	0
Career total			133	19	10	0	22	1	0	0	165	27
