= Nekmíř =

- Municipality
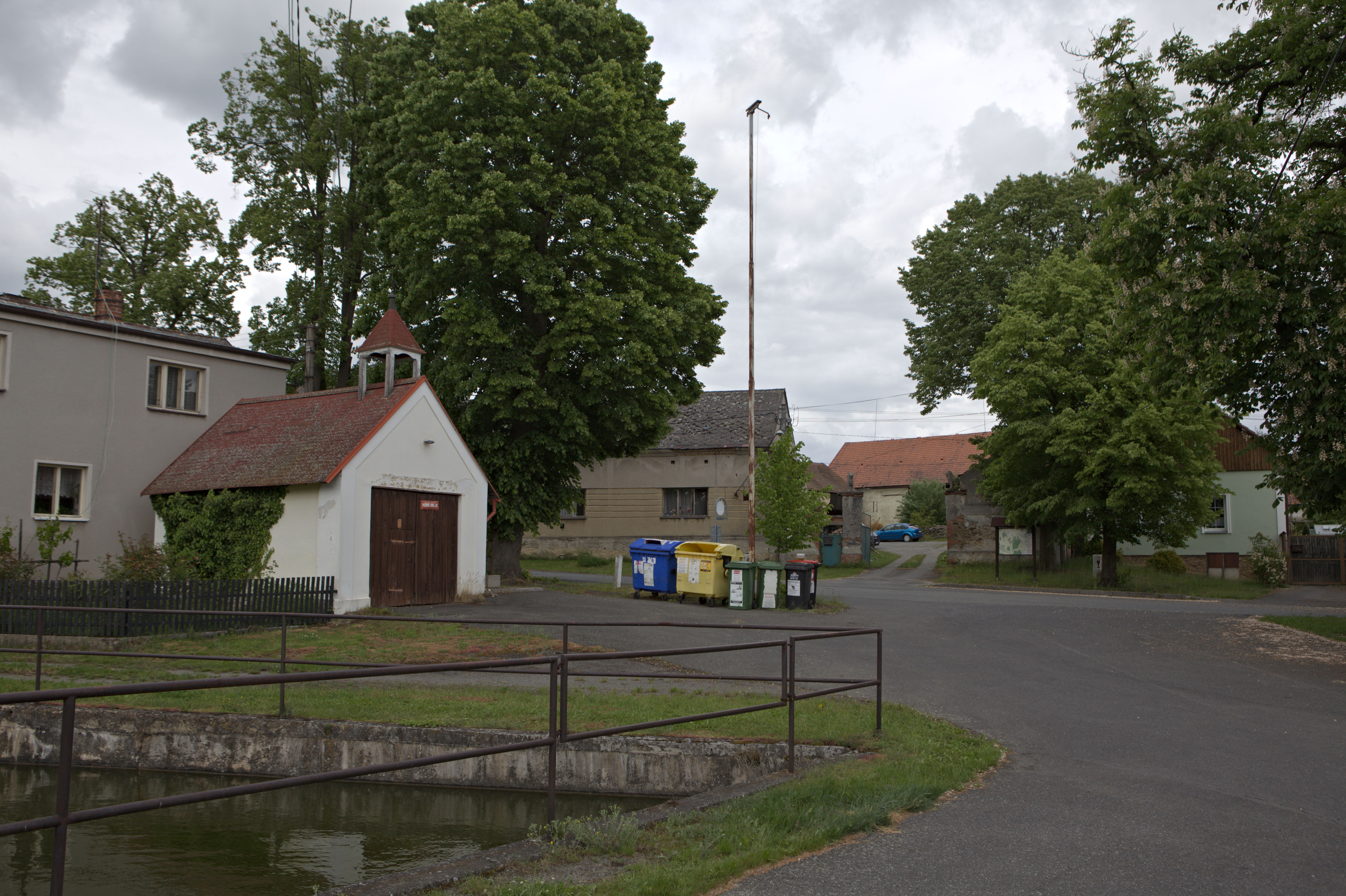
- Lhotka, a part of Nekmíř

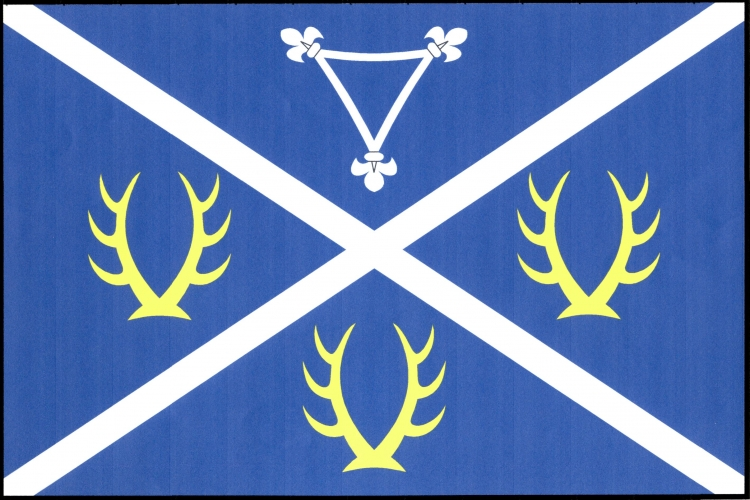
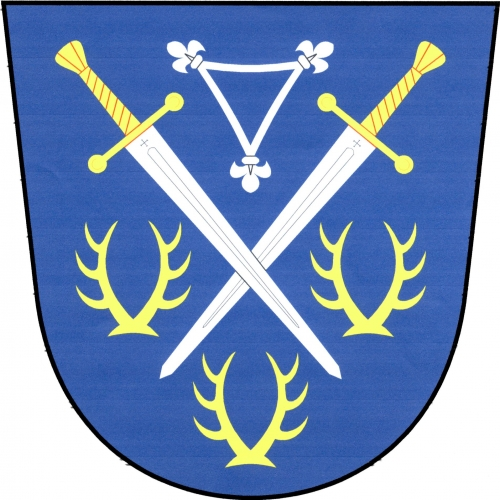
- Flag Coat of arms

- Location in the Czech Republic
- Coordinates: 49°51′29″N 13°15′48″E
- Country: Czech Republic
- Region: Plzeň
- District: Plzeň-North
- First mentioned: 1358

Area
  - Total: 9.85 km^{2} (3.80 sq mi)
- Elevation: 442 m (1,450 ft)

Population (2026-01-01)
  - Total: 554
  - Density: 56.2/km^{2} (146/sq mi)
- Time zone: UTC+1 (CET)
  - Summer (DST): UTC+2 (CEST)
- Postal code: 331 52
- Website: www.nekmir.cz

Nekmíř is a municipality and village in Plzeň-North District in the Plzeň Region of the Czech Republic. It has about 600 inhabitants.

Nekmíř lies approximately 15 kilometres (9 mi) north-west of Plzeň and 87 km (54 mi) west of Prague.

== Administrative division ==
Nekmíř consists of two municipal parts (in brackets population according to the 2021 census):

- Nekmíř (467)
- Lhotka (61)

== Demographics ==
Historical population
Year	Pop.	±%
1869	508	—
1880	599	+17.9%
1890	578	−3.5%
1900	578	+0.0%
1910	574	−0.7%
1921	667	+16.2%
1930	584	−12.4%
1950	531	−9.1%
1961	509	−4.1%
1970	464	−8.8%
1980	417	−10.1%
1991	403	−3.4%
2001	393	−2.5%
2011	445	+13.2%
2021	528	+18.7%
Source: Censuses

== Notable people ==
- Aleš Mandous (born 1992), footballer
