= Aleš Mandous =

Czech footballer

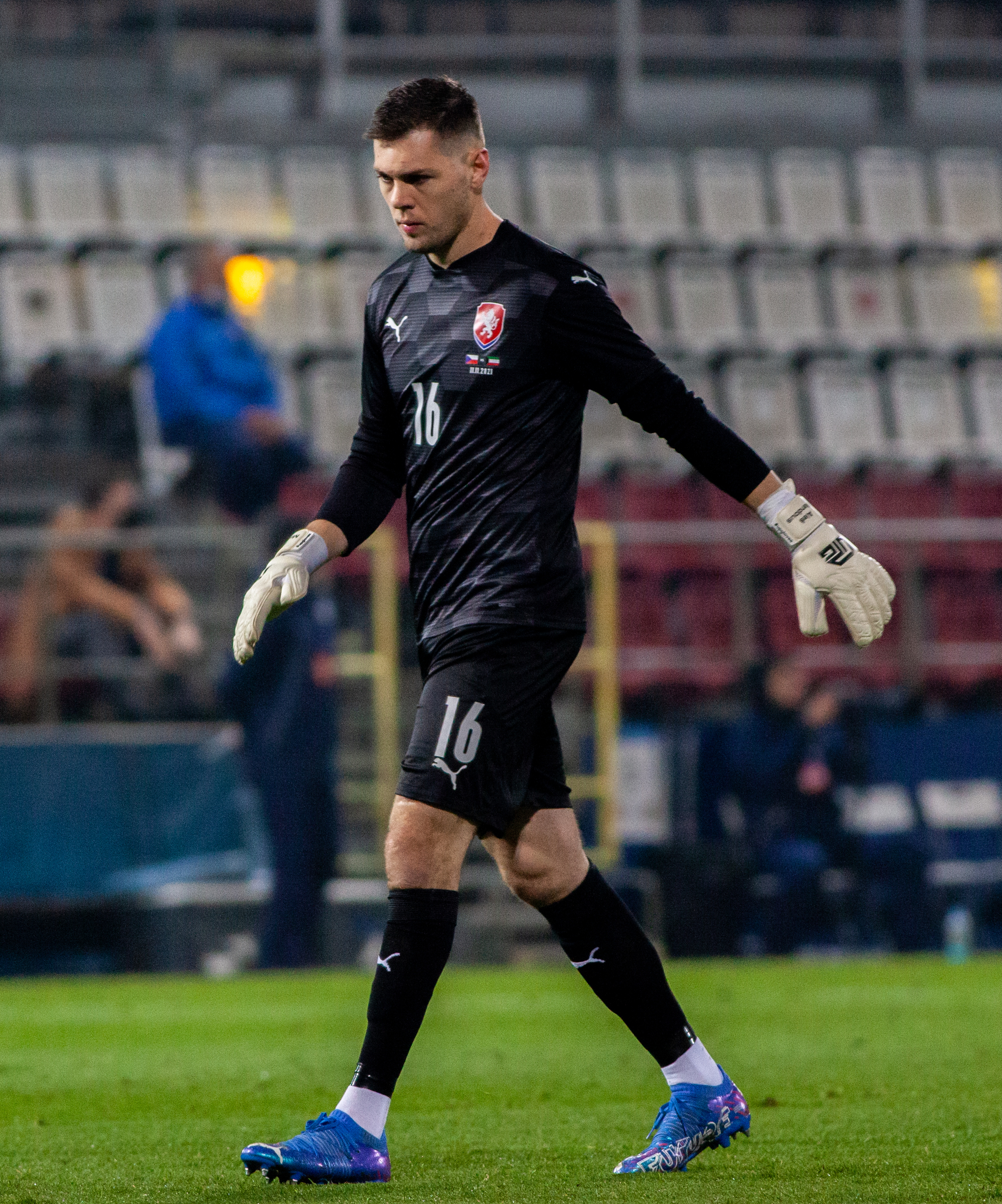
- Mandous with the Czech Republic in 2021

Personal information
- Date of birth: 21 April 1992 (age 34)
- Place of birth: Nekmíř, Czechoslovakia
- Height: 1.88 m (6 ft 2 in)
- Position: Goalkeeper

Team information
- Current team: Pardubice
- Number: 33

Youth career
- 1998–2002: TJ Sokol Nekmíř
- 2002–2012: Viktoria Plzeň

Senior career*
Years	Team	Apps	(Gls)
2012–2015	Viktoria Plzeň	0	(0)
2013–2014	→ Bohemians Střížkov (loan)	18	(0)
2014–2015	→ Baník Most (loan)	18	(0)
2015–2018	Žilina	7	(0)
2015–2018	→→ Žilina II	40	(0)
2018–2021	Sigma Olomouc	47	(0)
2021–2026	Slavia Prague	47	(0)
2025	→ Mladá Boleslav (loan)	21	(0)
2026–	Pardubice	5	(0)

International career
2013	Czech Republic U21	1	(0)
2020–2023	Czech Republic	4	(0)
- * Club domestic league appearances and goals as of 27 May 2026

Aleš Mandous (born 21 April 1992) is a Czech professional footballer who plays as a goalkeeper for Pardubice. He also has four caps for the Czech Republic national team.

== Club career ==
=== Viktoria Plzeň ===
On 23 March 2013, Mandous made his competitive debut in the second leg of the fourth round of the Czech Cup against Hradec Králové. Plzeň won the game 1–0 and advanced to the next round.

=== Bohemians Prague (Střížkov) ===
Mandous spent the following season on loan at Bohemians Prague (Střížkov). Mandous played 18 games in this campaign, which ended with the club being relegated to the third flight of Czech football.

=== Baník Most ===
In the summer of 2014, Mandous was sent on loan. This time he joined Baník Most, who were at that time in the second tier of Czech football. He played in 18 matches and was relegated with the club in 2015.

=== MŠK Žilina ===
Mandous joined Žilina as a free agent in June 2015, when he signed a two-year contract with the club. On 12 August 2015, he made his competitive debut in the Slovak Cup match against ŠK Strážske, which Žilina won 9–0.

=== Mladá Boleslav ===
On 5 February 2025, Mandous joined Mladá Boleslav on a half-year loan deal without option.

=== Pardubice ===
On 8 January 2025, Mandous signed a two-and-half-year contract with Pardubice.

== International career ==
On 4 June 2013, Mandous played his sole game for the Czech under-21 team. In this match, the Czech Republic lost 3–0 to Austria.

In September 2020, Mandous was selected as one of 23 players called up to the national team due to the original squad having to quarantine due to exposure to Coronavirus. Mandous played the full 90 minutes for Czech Republic against Scotland which ended in a 2–1 defeat for the home side.

== Career statistics ==
=== Club ===
As of 10 March 2024

Appearances and goals by club, season and competition
Club	Season	League			Cup		Continental		Other		Total	
Club	Season	Division	Apps	Goals	Apps	Goals	Apps	Goals	Apps	Goals	Apps	Goals
Bohemians Střížkov (loan)	2013–14	Czech National Football League	18	0	0	0	—		—		18	0
Baník Most (loan)	2014–15	Czech National Football League	18	0	0	0	—		—		18	0
Žilina	2015–16	Slovak Super Liga	2	0	2	0	—		—		4	0
Žilina	2016–17	Slovak Super Liga	3	0	0	0	—		—		3	0
Žilina	2017–18	Slovak Super Liga	2	0	3	0	2	0	—		7	0
Žilina	Total		7	0	5	0	2	0	—		14	0
Sigma Olomouc	2018–19	Czech First League	1	0	0	0	0	0	—		1	0
Sigma Olomouc	2019–20	Czech First League	16	0	4	0	—		—		20	0
Sigma Olomouc	2020–21	Czech First League	30	0	2	0	—		—		32	0
Sigma Olomouc	Total		47	0	6	0	0	0	—		53	0
Slavia Prague	2021–22	Czech First League	20	0	2	0	10	0	—		32	0
Slavia Prague	2022–23	Czech First League	10	0	1	0	8	0	—		19	0
Slavia Prague	2023–24	Czech First League	16	0	2	0	6	0	—		24	0
Slavia Prague	Total		46	0	5	0	24	0	—		75	0
Career total			136	0	16	0	26	0	0	0	178	0

=== International ===
As of 7 September 2020

Czech Republic
Year	Apps	Goals
2020	1	0
Total	1	0
