= Ivan Schranz =

Slovak footballer (born 1993)

Personal information
- Date of birth: 13 September 1993 (age 33)
- Place of birth: Bratislava, Slovakia
- Height: 1.85 m (6 ft 1 in)
- Positions: Forward; winger

Team information
- Current team: Slavia Prague
- Number: 26

Youth career
- 1998–2007: Inter Bratislava
- 2008–2010: Jozef Vengloš Academy

Senior career*
Years	Team	Apps	(Gls)
2010–2011	Petržalka	31	(6)
2012–2017	Spartak Trnava	97	(21)
2015	→ Sparta Prague (loan)	0	(0)
2017–2019	Dukla Prague	40	(8)
2019	AEL Limassol	7	(0)
2019–2020	Dynamo České Budějovice	30	(9)
2020–2021	Jablonec	28	(13)
2021–	Slavia Prague	116	(21)

International career^{‡}
2010–2012	Slovakia U19	9	(0)
2012–2014	Slovakia U21	10	(4)
2020–	Slovakia	39	(8)
- * Club domestic league appearances and goals as of 16:30, 20 September 2026 (UTC) ‡ National team caps and goals as of 22:24, 6 October 2026 (UTC)

Ivan Schranz (born 13 September 1993) is a Slovak professional footballer who plays as a forward or winger for Czech First League club Slavia Prague and the Slovakia national team.

Schranz finished as the joint-top scorer of the UEFA European Championship in 2024 with three goals, as his nation reached the last 16.

== Club career ==
=== Petržalka and Trnava ===
Having started his club career in the Slovak Second League at Petržalka, where he played for a year and a half, Schranz joined Spartak Trnava at the age of 18 in January 2012. He made his league debut against Banská Bystrica on 5 May of the same year. Schranz also made his European competition debut and in July 2014 scored twice in a UEFA Europa League qualifier against Scottish Premiership club St Johnstone. In the middle of the 2014–15 season Schranz headed to Czech side Sparta Prague on loan, but made no league appearances for the side before returning to Trnava. He continued to play for Trnava until the end of the 2016–17 season, playing 125 matches and scoring 25 goals overall.

=== Czech arrival ===
Schranz returned to the Czech Republic, joining Dukla Prague in summer 2017. He scored 8 goals in 40 appearances for Dukla, leaving the club mid-way through his second season after losing his place in the starting lineup. Schranz played in Cyprus for AEL Limassol in spring 2019, where he played seven matches for the club without scoring. He then returned to the Czech First League, signing a year-long contract with České Budějovice. After good results, Schranz signed a three-year contract with Jablonec in July 2020. He continued his good form from the previous season, scoring 13 goals in 28 league games for Jablonec.

=== Slavia Prague ===
On 31 May 2021, Schranz joined Slavia Prague on a long-term contract in advance of the 2021–22 season. The same year on 30 July, in only his second match for Slavia, Schranz scored a hat-trick in a league win over Teplice.

== International career ==
On 4 September 2020, Schranz debuted for the senior Slovakia national team in a 3–1 loss against the Czech Republic at the 2020–21 UEFA Nations League, where he also scored his first goal.

In May 2021, Schranz was included in Slovakia's final squad for the rescheduled UEFA Euro 2020 tournament, but did not make an appearance.

=== Euro 2024 ===
In June 2024, Schranz was called up to represent Slovakia at UEFA Euro 2024. He scored the only goal of their opening match as they achieved an upset 1–0 victory over Belgium. He scored again in a 2–1 loss to Ukraine in their second match, making him the first ever Slovak player to score more than one goal at the UEFA European Championship. Schranz scored his third goal of the tournament in the round of 16 match against England. His first-half goal put Slovakia 1–0 up, a lead they held for most of the match, although England equalised in injury time and subsequently scored again in extra time for a 2–1 England win, sending Slovakia out of the tournament. His three goals at the tournament earned him the golden boot award, alongside five other players.

== Career statistics ==
=== Club ===
As of match played 20 September 2026

Appearances and goals by club, season and competition
Club	Season	League			National cup (Note: Includes Czech Cup, Slovak Cup, Cypriot Cup)		Continental		Other		Total	
Club	Season	Division	Apps	Goals	Apps	Goals	Apps	Goals	Apps	Goals	Apps	Goals
Spartak Trnava	2011–12	Slovak Super Liga	3	1	—		—		—		3	1
Spartak Trnava	2012–13	Slovak Super Liga	21	4	3	1	2 (Note: Appearance(s) in UEFA Europa League)	0	—		26	5
Spartak Trnava	2013–14	Slovak Super Liga	24	2	3	0	—		—		27	2
Spartak Trnava	2014–15	Slovak Super Liga	9	2	1	0	8	2	—		18	2
Spartak Trnava	2015–16	Slovak Super Liga	22	8	1	0	2	0	—		25	8
Spartak Trnava	2016–17	Slovak Super Liga	28	4	1	0	6	1	—		25	5
Spartak Trnava	Total		97	21	9	1	18	3	—		124	25
Sparta Prague (loan)	2014–15	Czech First League	0	0	2	0	—		—		2	0
Dukla Prague	2017–18	Czech First League	25	4	2	0	—		—		27	4
Dukla Prague	2018–19	Czech First League	15	4	3	1	—		—		18	5
Dukla Prague	Total		40	8	5	1	—		—		45	9
AEL Limassol	2018–19	Cypriot First Division	7	0	5	1	—		—		12	1
Dynamo České Budějovice	2019–20	Czech First League	30	9	3	1	—		—		33	10
Jablonec	2020–21	Czech First League	28	13	1	1	1 (Note: Appearance(s) in UEFA Europa Conference League)	2	—		30	16
Slavia Prague	2021–22	Czech First League	29	10	1	0	14 (Note: Two appearances in UEFA Champions League, two appearances in UEFA Europa League, ten appearances and three goals in UEFA Europa Conference League)	3	—		44	13
Slavia Prague	2022–23	Czech First League	22	5	2	0	7	2	—		31	7
Slavia Prague	2023–24	Czech First League	21	2	2	1	9	5	—		32	8
Slavia Prague	2024–25	Czech First League	20	2	2	0	8 (Note: Four appearances and one goal in UEFA Champions League and UEFA Europa League)	2	—		30	4
Slavia Prague	2025–26	Czech First League	17	2	1	0	3 (Note: Appearances in UEFA Champions League)	2	—		21	2
Slavia Prague	2026–27	Czech First League	7	0	1	3	1	0	—		9	3
Slavia Prague	Total		116	21	9	4	42	10	—		167	37
Career total			318	56	34	9	61	17	0	0	413	82

=== International ===
As of match played 6 October 2026

Appearances and goals by national team and year
National team	Year	Apps	Goals
Slovakia	2020	4	1
Slovakia	2021	8	2
Slovakia	2022	3	0
Slovakia	2023	5	0
Slovakia	2024	7	3
Slovakia	2025	7	1
Slovakia	2026	4	1
Total		39	8

As of match played 26 September 2026
Scores and results list Slovakia's goal tally first, score column indicates score after each Schranz goal.

List of international goals scored by Ivan Schranz
No.	Date	Venue	Cap	Opponent	Score	Result	Competition
1	4 September 2020	Tehelné pole, Bratislava, Slovakia	1	Czech Republic	1–3	1–3	2020–21 UEFA Nations League B
2	7 September 2021	Tehelné pole, Bratislava, Slovakia	11	Cyprus	1–0	2–0	2022 FIFA World Cup qualification
3	11 October 2021	Gradski Vrt, Osijek, Croatia	13	Croatia	1–0	2–2	2022 FIFA World Cup qualification
4	17 June 2024	Waldstadion, Frankfurt, Germany	23	Belgium	1–0	1–0	UEFA Euro 2024
5	21 June 2024	Merkur Spiel-Arena, Düsseldorf, Germany	24	Ukraine	1–0	1–2	UEFA Euro 2024
6	30 June 2024	Arena AufSchalke, Gelsenkirchen, Germany	26	England	1–0	1–2 (a.e.t.)	UEFA Euro 2024
7	13 October 2025	Anton Malatinský Stadium, Trnava, Slovakia	34	Luxembourg	2–0	2–0	2026 FIFA World Cup qualification
8	26 September 2026	Tatran Stadium, Prešov, Slovakia	36	Moldova	1–0	2–0	2026–27 UEFA Nations League C

== Honours ==
AEL Limassol

- Cypriot Cup: 2018–19

Slavia Prague

- Czech First League: 2024–25, 2025–26
- Czech Cup: 2022–23

Individual

- UEFA European Championship top scorer: 2024 (shared)
