= Jan Stejskal (footballer, born 1997) =

Czech footballer

Personal information
- Date of birth: 14 February 1997 (age 29)
- Place of birth: Pardubice, Czech Republic
- Height: 1.90 m (6 ft 3 in)
- Position: Goalkeeper

Team information
- Current team: Pardubice
- Number: 13

Youth career
- Pardubice

Senior career*
Years	Team	Apps	(Gls)
2015–2020	Hradec Králové	0	(0)
2016–2017	→ Pardubice (loan)	0	(0)
2017–2018	→ Převýšov (loan)	6	(0)
2018	→ Olympia Radotín (loan)	13	(0)
2019–2020	→ Mladá Boleslav (loan)	1	(0)
2020–2021	Mladá Boleslav	13	(0)
2020–2021	→ Slavia Prague (loan)	0	(0)
2021–2024	Slavia Prague	1	(0)
2023	Slavia Prague B	8	(0)
2021–2022	→ Olomouc (loan)	7	(0)
2022	→ Liberec (loan)	0	(0)
2023–2024	→ Vyškov (loan)	19	(0)
2024–	Pardubice	22	(0)
2025–	Pardubice B	13	(0)

International career^{‡}
2012–2013	Czech Republic U16	3	(0)
2013–2014	Czech Republic U17	5	(0)
2014–2015	Czech Republic U18	4	(0)
2015–2016	Czech Republic U19	9	(0)
2017–2018	Czech Republic U21	2	(0)
- * Club domestic league appearances and goals as of 27 May 2026 ‡ National team caps and goals as of 18 January 2021

Jan Stejskal (born 14 February 1997) is a Czech professional footballer who plays for Pardubice, as a goalkeeper.

== Club career ==
=== Early career ===
On youth level he played for FK Pardubice.

On 1 July 2015 he moved to FC Hradec Králové in the Czech First League. During his time at the club he did not make a league appearance, and was restricted to a handful of appearances in the Czech Cup between loans to other lower-league clubs. He scored a 93rd-minute equaliser to send his team's first round match against Spartak Slatiňany to extra time in the 2018-19 Czech Cup.

On 1 July 2016 he was loaned back to Pardubice in the Czech National Football League. In six months long loan he played in 1 match in the Czech Cup.

On 18 July 2017 he was loaned to SK Převýšov in the third-tier Bohemian Football League. In six months long loan he played in 6 league matches and in 1 match in the Czech Cup.

On 22 February 2018 he was loaned to Olympia Prague in Czech National Football League. In four months long loan he played in 13 league matches.

=== First League breakthrough ===
On 10 January 2019 he was loaned to FK Mladá Boleslav in Czech First League. In one year long loan he played in one league match for the first team and one league match for the reserve team (playing in the Bohemian Football League). On 1 January 2020 he made his move to Mladá Boleslav permanent. He played in 13 league matches for the first team.

Stejskal joined SK Slavia Prague on a half-season loan in September 2020. Despite not playing for the first team in his loan spell, he joined Slavia Prague on a permanent basis on 14 January 2021, signing a contract until June 2025. He made his debut for the first team in the Czech Cup match against Dukla Prague on 19 January 2021. He made his league debut for Slavia on 23 May 2021 in the 1–1 draw at Jablonec.

Stejskal was loaned to Olomouc for the 2021–22 season, making seven league appearances. He then spent time on loan at Liberec, where he didn't make a league appearance, before returning to Slavia at the start of 2023. During the summer of 2023, he joined second-tier side Vyškov on loan.

On 19 July 2024, Stejskal signed a three-year contract with Pardubice.

== International career ==
He had played international football at under-16, 17, 18, 19 and 21 level for Czech Republic U16, Czech Republic U17, Czech Republic U18, Czech Republic U19 and Czech Republic U21. He played in 23 matches.

== Personal life ==
He is not related to the older Jan Stejskal, who also played as a goalkeeper and played for Czechoslovakia in the 1990 FIFA World Cup.

== Honours ==
SK Slavia Prague

- Czech First League: 2020–21
- Czech Cup: 2020–21
