= Chaloupky =

- Municipality
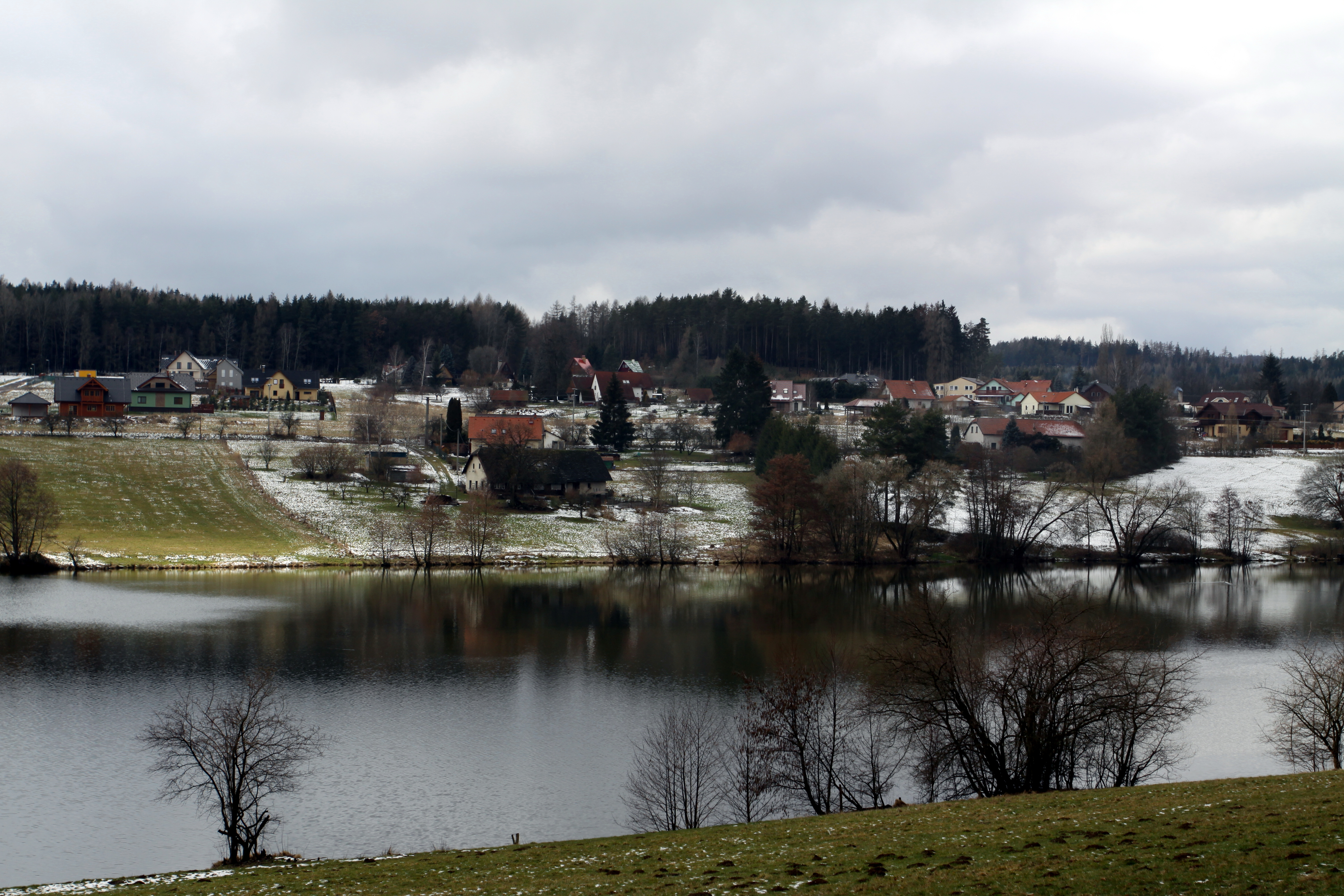
- View of Chaloupky across Záskalská Reservoir

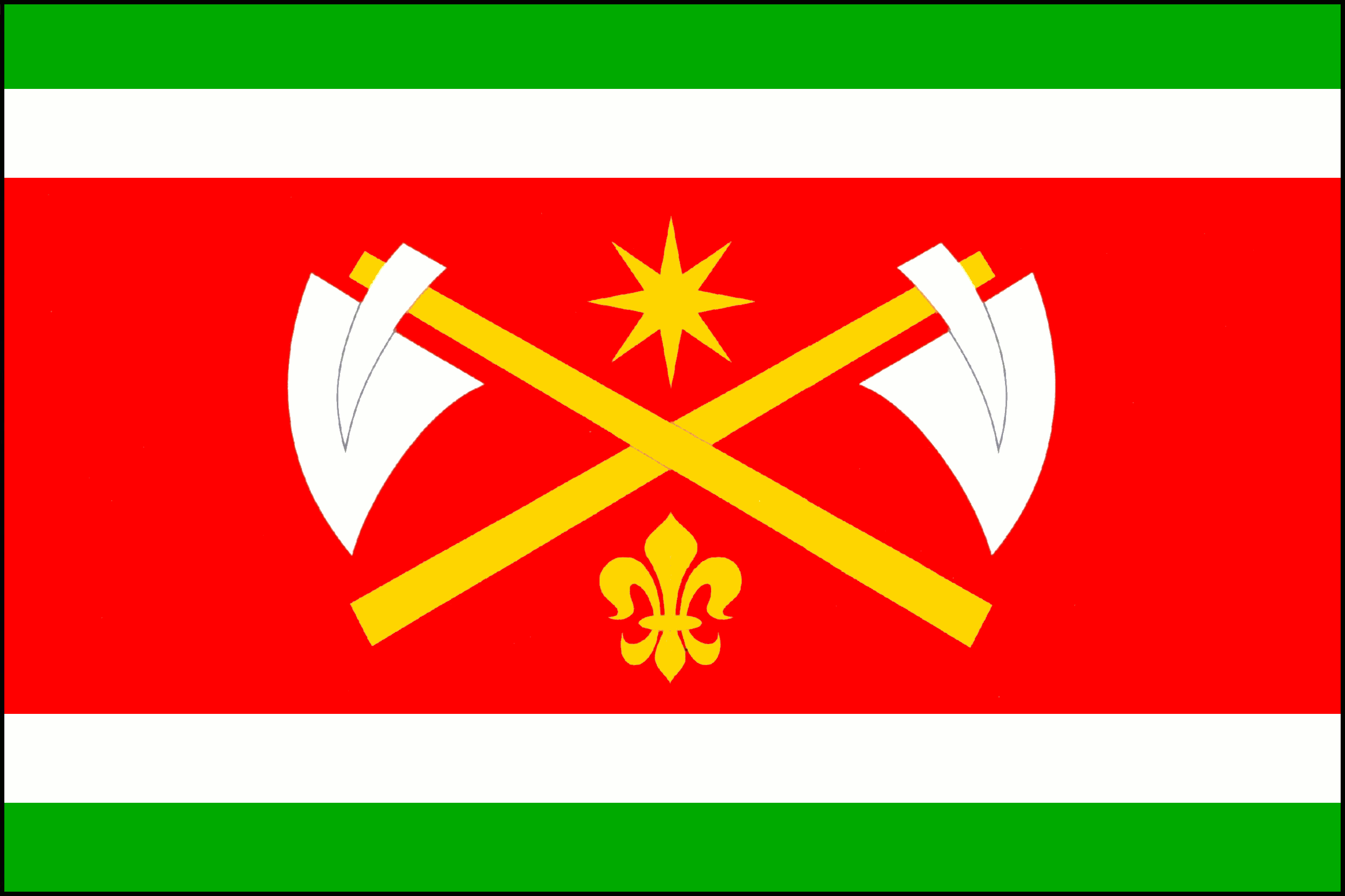
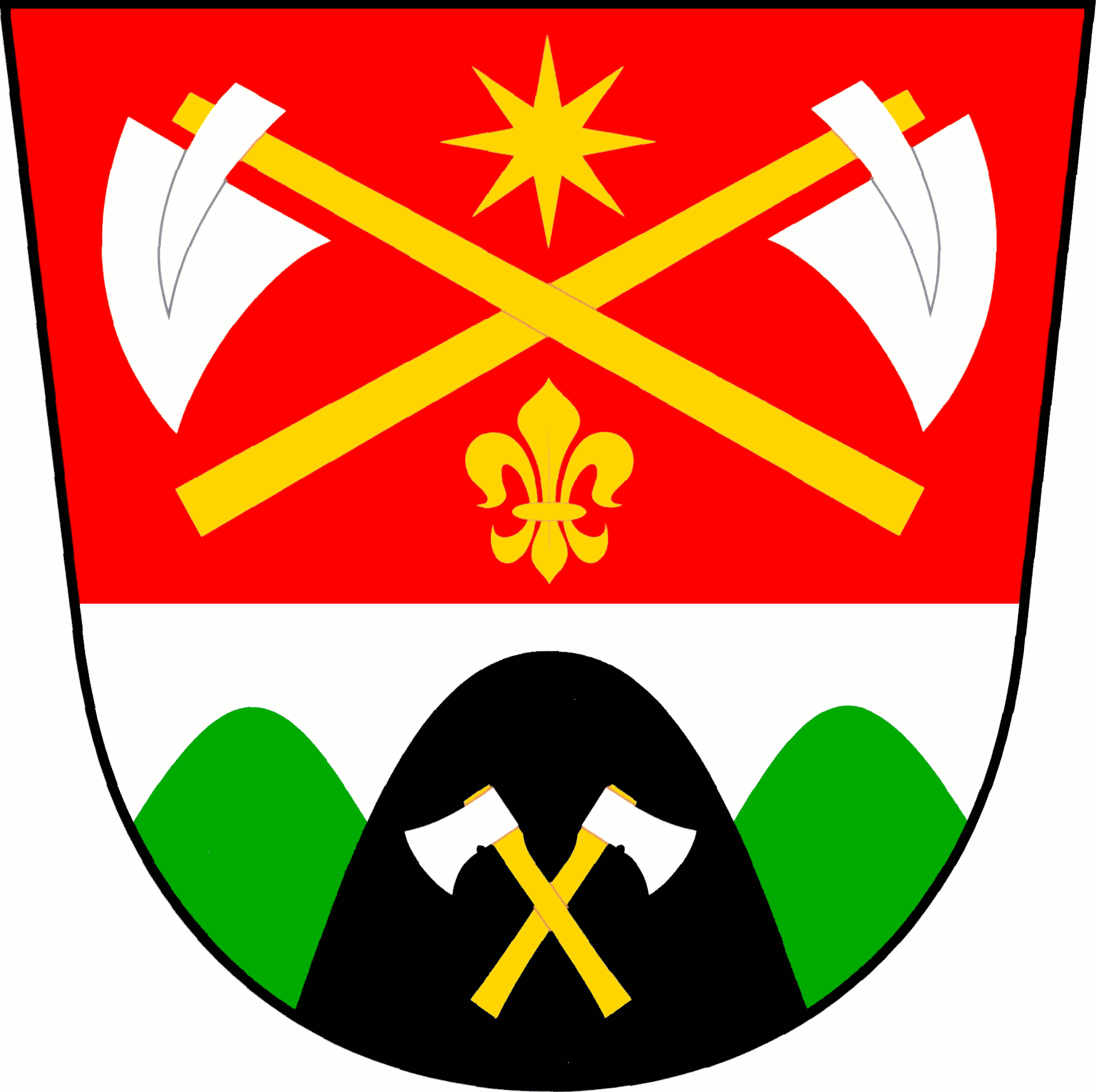
- Flag Coat of arms

- Location in the Czech Republic
- Coordinates: 49°47′29″N 13°52′18″E
- Country: Czech Republic
- Region: Central Bohemian
- District: Beroun
- First mentioned: 1648

Area
  - Total: 6.57 km^{2} (2.54 sq mi)
- Elevation: 475 m (1,558 ft)

Population (2026-01-01)
  - Total: 527
  - Density: 80.2/km^{2} (208/sq mi)
- Time zone: UTC+1 (CET)
  - Summer (DST): UTC+2 (CEST)
- Postal code: 267 62
- Website: www.obecchaloupky.cz

Chaloupky is a municipality and village in Beroun District in the Central Bohemian Region of the Czech Republic. It has about 500 inhabitants.

== Administrative division ==
Chaloupky consists of two municipal parts (in brackets population according to the 2021 census):

- Chaloupky (451)
- Neřežín (77)

== Etymology ==
The name Chaloupky literally means 'little cottages' in Czech.

== Geography ==
Chaloupky is located about 23 kilometres (14 mi) southwest of Beroun and 48 km (30 mi) southwest of Prague. It lies in the Brdy Highlands. The highest point is at 722 m (2,369 ft) above sea level. The Záskalská Reservoir, built on the stream Červený potok, is located in the municipality.

== History ==
The first written mention of Chaloupky is from 1648.

== Demographics ==
Historical population

Year	Pop.	±%
1869	800	—
1880	684	−14.5%
1890	690	+0.9%
1900	739	+7.1%
1910	780	+5.5%

Year	Pop.	±%
1921	720	−7.7%
1930	694	−3.6%
1950	546	−21.3%
1961	480	−12.1%
1970	434	−9.6%

Year	Pop.	±%
1980	398	−8.3%
1991	362	−9.0%
2001	383	+5.8%
2011	508	+32.6%
2021	528	+3.9%

Source: Censuses

== Transport ==
There are no railways or major roads passing through the municipality.

== Sights ==
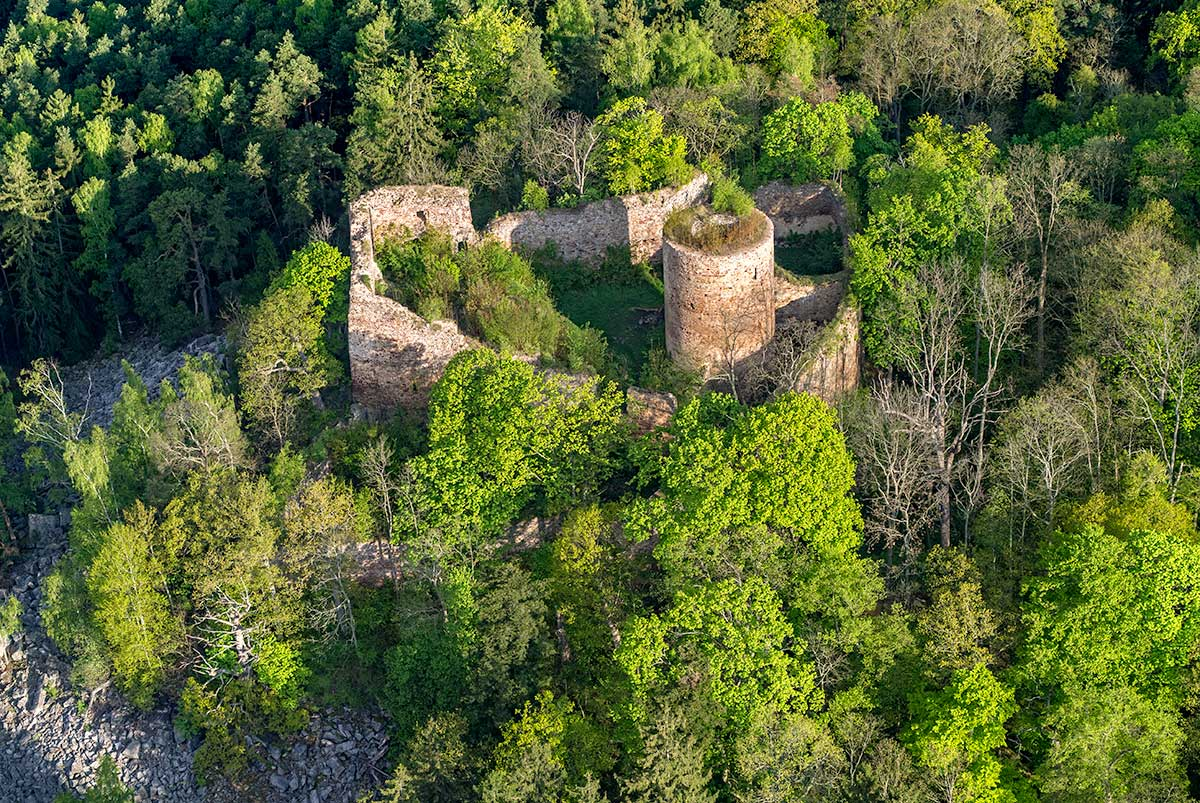
Valdek Castle

The only historical monument in the municipality is the ruin of the Valdek Castle, located near Neřežín. It was built by the Buzic family probably around 1260 and once owned by King Wenceslaus IV. In 1623, it was described as desolated. Today the castle is in a state of disrepair and inaccessible. The most notable preserved element of the castle is the bergfried.

== In popular culture ==
Valdek Castle was used as a filming location for the TV series F. L. Věk (1971–1972) and for the 1997 movie Snow White: A Tale of Terror.
