= 2021–22 FC Zbrojovka Brno season =

FC Zbrojovka Brno
2021–22 season
- President: Václav Bartoněk
- Manager: Richard Dostálek
- Stadium: Městský fotbalový stadion Srbská
- Fortuna národní liga: 1st
- Czech Cup: Third round
- Top goalscorer: League: Jakub Řezníček (18); All: Jakub Řezníček (19)
- Highest home attendance: 6,118 v Líšeň
- Lowest home attendance: 2,114 v Vlašim
- Average home league attendance: 3,008
- Biggest win: 6–1 vs Ústí nad Labem
- Biggest defeat: 1–3 vs Líšeň
Home colours	Away colours

The 2021–22 FC Zbrojovka Brno season is the club's fourth season in the Fortuna národní liga. The team is competing in Fortuna národní liga and the Czech Cup.

== First team squad ==
As of 22 April 2022.

Note: Flags indicate national team as defined under FIFA eligibility rules; some limited exceptions apply. Players may hold more than one non-FIFA nationality.

No.	Pos.	Nation	Player
4	DF	(Czech Republic) CZE	Jan Hlavica
5	MF	(Czech Republic) CZE	David Jambor
6	DF	(Czech Republic) CZE	Lukáš Endl
7	MF	(Czech Republic) CZE	Pavel Zavadil
8	FW	(Czech Republic) CZE	Lukáš Rogožan
9	MF	(Czech Republic) CZE	Marek Mach
11	MF	(Czech Republic) CZE	Adam Fousek
13	MF	(Czech Republic) CZE	Jiří Texl
14	FW	(Czech Republic) CZE	Jakub Přichystal
15	DF	(Czech Republic) CZE	Jan Štěrba (on loan from Sigma Olomouc)
17	DF	(Czech Republic) CZE	Jan Moravec
18	MF	(Czech Republic) CZE	Oldřich Pragr
19	MF	(Czech Republic) CZE	Michal Ševčík

No.	Pos.	Nation	Player
20	FW	(Czech Republic) CZE	Jan Hladík
21	MF	(Czech Republic) CZE	Filip Blecha (on loan from Slavia Prague)
22	DF	(Czech Republic) CZE	Matěj Hrabina
23	DF	(Czech Republic) CZE	Jakub Šural
24	MF	(Slovakia) SVK	Peter Štepanovský
25	MF	(Czech Republic) CZE	Jakub Nečas
27	MF	(Slovakia) SVK	Damián Bariš
29	MF	(Slovakia) SVK	Adrián Čermák
34	MF	(Czech Republic) CZE	Ota Kohoutek
37	FW	(Czech Republic) CZE	Jakub Řezníček
41	DF	(Czech Republic) CZE	Miroslav Kamenský
53	GK	(Czech Republic) CZE	Martin Berkovec
71	GK	(Czech Republic) CZE	Jakub Šiman (on loan from Viktoria Plzeň)

=== Out on loan ===
As of 22 April 2022.

Note: Flags indicate national team as defined under FIFA eligibility rules; some limited exceptions apply. Players may hold more than one non-FIFA nationality.

No.	Pos.	Nation	Player
—	GK	(Czech Republic) CZE	Jiří Floder (at Chrudim)
—	DF	(Czech Republic) CZE	Tomáš Chyla (at Blansko)
—	MF	(Czech Republic) CZE	Ondřej Pachlopník (at Viktoria Plzeň)

No.	Pos.	Nation	Player
—	MF	(Czech Republic) CZE	Martin Sedlák (at Vyškov)
—	FW	(Czech Republic) CZE	Claude Lhotecký (at Kroměříž)

== Transfers ==
=== In ===
Pos	Player	Transferred from	Fee	Window	Date	Source
DF	(Czech Republic) Pavel Zavadil	Retirement	Free transfer	Summer	18 June 2021	
DF	(Czech Republic) Matěj Hrabina	(Czech Republic) Opava	Free transfer	Summer	1 July 2021	
FW	(Czech Republic) Jakub Řezníček	(Czech Republic) Teplice	Free transfer	Summer	5 July 2021	
MF	(Czech Republic) Jiří Texl	(Czech Republic) Sigma Olomouc	Undisclosed	Summer	13 July 2021	
DF	(Czech Republic) Jan Štěrba	(Czech Republic) Sigma Olomouc	Loan ^{(without option)}	Summer	13 July 2021	
DF	(Czech Republic) Daniel Kosek	(Czech Republic) Slavia Praha	Loan ^{(with option)}	Summer	21 July 2021	
GK	(Czech Republic) Jakub Šiman	(Czech Republic) Viktoria Plzeň	Loan ^{(with option)}	Winter	10 January 2022	
FW	(Czech Republic) Claude Lhotecký	(Czech Republic) Kroměříž	Loan return	Winter	10 January 2022	
MF	(Czech Republic) David Jambor	(Czech Republic) Vyškov	Loan return	Winter	10 January 2022	
MF	(Czech Republic) Marek Mach	(Czech Republic) Blansko	Undisclosed	Winter	10 January 2022	
MF	(Czech Republic) Jakub Nečas	(Czech Republic) Liberec	Undisclosed	Winter	22 January 2022	
MF	(Czech Republic) Filip Blecha	(Czech Republic) Slavia Praha	Loan ^{(without option)}	Winter	11 February 2022	

=== Out ===
Pos	Player	Transferred to	Fee	Window	Date	Source
FW	(Czech Republic) Daniel Fila	(Czech Republic) Mladá Boleslav	€650,000	Summer	16 June 2021	
DF	(Czech Republic) Luděk Pernica	(Czech Republic) Viktoria Plzeň	Loan return	Summer	16 June 2021	
FW	(Czech Republic) Antonín Růsek	(Czech Republic) Sigma Olomouc	€500,000	Summer	17 June 2021	
MF	(Czech Republic) Ondřej Pachlopník	(Czech Republic) Viktoria Plzeň	Loan ^{(with option)}	Summer	18 June 2021	
MF	(Czech Republic) Rudolf Reiter	(Czech Republic) Baník Ostrava	Loan return	Summer	21 June 2021	
DF	(Slovakia) Timotej Záhumenský	(Slovakia) Pohronie	Free transfer	Summer	21 June 2021	
MF	(Czech Republic) Šimon Šumbera	(Slovakia) Senica	Free transfer	Summer	21 June 2021	
MF	(Czech Republic) Marek Vintr	(Czech Republic) Vyškov	Free transfer	Summer	21 June 2021	
DF	(Serbia) Zoran Gajić	(Armenia) Pyunik Yerevan	Free transfer	Summer	21 June 2021	
GK	(Czech Republic) Martin Šustr	(Czech Republic) Vyškov	Undisclosed	Summer	23 June 2021	
MF	(Czech Republic) Jan Sedlák	(Czech Republic) Sigma Olomouc	Undisclosed	Summer	13 July 2021	
MF	(Czech Republic) David Jambor	(Czech Republic) Vyškov	Loan ^{(without option)}	Summer	28 July 2021	
FW	(Czech Republic) Claude Lhotecký	(Czech Republic) Kroměříž	Loan ^{(without option)}	Summer	28 July 2021	
MF	(Czech Republic) David Moučka	(Czech Republic) Znojmo	Loan ^{(without option)}	Summer	30 June 2021	
DF	(Czech Republic) Pavel Dreksa	(Cyprus) Paralimni	Free transfer	Summer	9 August 2021	
FW	(Czech Republic) Martin Zikl	(Czech Republic) Líšeň	Undisclosed	Summer	8 September 2021	
FW	(Czech Republic) Martin Sedlák	(Czech Republic) Vyškov	Loan ^{(without option)}	Winter	3 February 2022	
MF	(Czech Republic) Barnabáš Lacík	(Czech Republic) Vyškov	Undisclosed ^{(buy-back option)}	Winter	3 February 2022	
MF	(Czech Republic) David Moučka	(Czech Republic) Vyškov	Undisclosed ^{(buy-back option)}	Winter	3 February 2022	
DF	(Czech Republic) Jakub Černín	(Czech Republic) Líšeň	Undisclosed	Winter	8 February 2022	
FW	(Czech Republic) Claude Lhotecký	(Czech Republic) Kroměříž	Loan ^{(without option)}	Winter	8 February 2022	

=== Overall transfer activity ===
==== Expenditure ====
Summer: ▼€0

Total: ▼€0

==== Income ====
Summer: ▲€1,150,000

Total: ▲€1,150,000

==== Net totals ====
Summer: ▲€1,150,000

Total: ▲€1,150,000

== Friendly matches ==
=== Pre-season ===
June 26, 2021 Friendly	Pardubice	0–2	Zbrojovka Brno	Pardubice
10:30 CEST (UTC+2)		Report	Přichystal 27'; M. Sedlák 55'	Stadium: Pod Vinicí; Referee: Petr Hocek

July 3, 2021 Friendly	Sigma Olomouc	2–0	Zbrojovka Brno	Slatinice
10:00 CEST (UTC+2)	Daněk 34', 35'	Report		Referee: Černý

July 10, 2021 Friendly	Vysočina Jihlava	1–2	Zbrojovka Brno	Jihlava
: CEST (UTC+2)	Vedral 67' (pen.)	Report	Hladík 29'; Zavadil 35'	Stadium: Areál Na Stoupách; Attendance: 200; Referee: Pavel Julínek

July 17, 2021 Friendly	Zlín	1–1	Zbrojovka Brno	Zlín
: CEST (UTC+2)	Vraštil 23'	Report	Zavadil 4' (pen.)	Stadium: Letná Stadion; Referee: Miroslav Zelinka

=== Mid-season ===
January 15, 2022 Friendly	Zbrojovka Brno	3–3	Zlín	Brno
11:00 CEST (UTC+2)	Ševčík 16'; Přichystal 42'; M. Sedlák 55'	Report	Poznar 27'; J. Hellebrand 63'; Bobčík 85'	Stadium: Fotbalové centrum Brno

January 19, 2021 Friendly	Viktoria Plzeň	1–1	Zbrojovka Brno	Plzeň
11:00 CEST (UTC+2)	Potočný 47'	Report	Řezníček 39'	Stadium: Luční ulice Attendance: 200; Referee: Jakub Šlajs

January 22, 2022 Tipsport liga	Zbrojovka Brno	3–1	Vyškov	Brno
10:30 CEST (UTC+2)	Hladík 5', 84', 89'	Report	Cabadaj 23' (pen.)	Stadium: Fotbalové centrum Brno

January 26, 2022 Tipsport liga	Zbrojovka Brno	1–3	Trenčín	Brno
13:00 CEST (UTC+2)	Přichystal 72'	Report	Letenay 9'; Ikoba 79', 85'	Stadium: Fotbalové centrum Brno; Referee: Cieslar

January 29, 2022 Tipsport liga	Sigma Olomouc	2–1	Zbrojovka Brno	Olomouc
15:00 CEST (UTC+2)	Chytil 14' (pen.); Zifčák 20'	Report	Štepanovský 89'	Stadium: Andrův stadion Attendance: 150; Referee: Machálek

February 2, 2022 Friendly	Banská Bystrica	2–3	Zbrojovka Brno	Senec
13:30 CEST (UTC+2)	Jakub Šulc 22', 62'	Report	Fousek 4', 33', 42'	Stadium: NTC Senec; Referee: Ochotnický

February 12, 2022 Friendly	Podbrezová	0–2	Zbrojovka Brno	Uherský Brod
11:00 CEST (UTC+2)		Report	Bartoš 4' (o.g.); Štepanovský 57' (pen.)

February 19, 2022 Friendly	Zbrojovka Brno	4–0	Petržalka	Brno
11:00 CEST (UTC+2)	Blecha 4'; Ševčík 38', 53'; Řezníček 65' (pen.)	Report		Stadium: Fotbalové centrum Brno; Attendance: 300; Referee: Adámková

February 26, 2022 Friendly	Zbrojovka Brno	3–1	Opava	Brno
14:00 CEST (UTC+2)	Texl 81'; Fousek 81'; Přichystal 89'	Report	Šigut 50'	Stadium: Městský fotbalový stadion Srbská; Attendance: 200; Referee: Křepský

== Competitions ==
Win Draw Loss

=== Overview ===
Competition	First match	Last match	Starting round	Final position	Record							
Competition	First match	Last match	Starting round	Final position	Pld	W	D	L	GF	GA	GD	Win %
Fortuna národní liga	24 July 2021	14 May 2022	Matchday 1	Winners	30	22	3	5	61	29	+32	73.33
MOL Cup	11 August 2021	6 October 2021	First round	Third round	3	2	0	1	8	6	+2	66.67
Total					33	24	3	6	69	35	+34	72.73

Last updated: 26 May 2022
Source: Competitions

=== Fortuna národní liga ===
==== Results summary ====
Overall								Home						Away					
Pld	W	D	L	GF	GA	GD	Pts	W	D	L	GF	GA	GD	W	D	L	GF	GA	GD
30	22	3	5	61	29	+32	69	11	3	1	34	19	+15	11	0	4	27	10	+17

Last updated: 26 May 2022.

==== Results by round ====
Round	1	2	3	4	5	6	7	8	9	10	11	12	13	14	15	16	17	18	19	20	21	22	23	24	25	26	27	28	29	30
Ground	A	H	A	H	A	H	A	H	A	H	H	A	H	A	H	A	H	A	H	A	H	A	H	A	A	H	A	H	A	H
Result	W	W	L	W	W	D	W	W	W	W	D	W	W	L	W	W	W	W	L	W	W	W	W	L	W	W	W	W	L	D
Position	6-7	4	6	2	2	3	2	1	1	1	1	1	1	1	1	1	1	1	1	1	1	1	1	1	1	1	1	1	1	1

Updated to match(es) played on 26 May 2022. Source:
A = Away; H = Home; W = Win; D = Draw; L = Loss

==== League table ====
Pos	Team	Pld	W	D	L	GF	GA	GD	Pts	Promotion or relegation
1	Zbrojovka Brno (C, Q)	30	22	3	5	61	29	+32	69	Promotion to 2022–23 Czech First League
2	Vlašim	30	16	5	9	61	39	+22	53	Qualification for promotion play-offs
3	Opava	30	14	9	7	47	33	+14	51	Qualification for promotion play-offs
4	Líšeň	30	14	8	8	45	33	+12	50	
5	Sparta Prague B	30	13	7	10	50	37	+13	46	

Source: Fortuna národní liga
Rules for classification: 1) Points; 2) Head-to-head points; 3) Head-to-head goal difference; 4) Head-to-head goals scored; 5) Goal difference; 6) Goals scored; 7) Play-off (if deciding promotion or relegation); 8) Draw
(C) Champions; (Q) Qualified for the phase indicated

==== Results ====
24 July 2021 1	Táborsko	0–1	Zbrojovka Brno	Tábor
18:00 CEST (UTC+2)	Provazník (yellow card) 19'; Holiš (yellow card) 45'	Report	Přichystal 82'; Kosek (yellow card) 89'	Stadium: Stadion v Kvapilově ulici Attendance: 890; Referee: Zbyněk Proske

1 August 2021 2	Zbrojovka Brno	2–1	Opava	Brno
20:00 CEST (UTC+2)	Kryštůfek (yellow card) 34'; Moravec 61'; Štěrba (yellow card) 66'; Zavadil 81' (pen.); Zavadil (yellow card) 88'; Čermák (yellow card) 90'	Report	Helešic 16' (pen.); Tiéhi (yellow card) 64'; Hnaníček (yellow card) 81'; Večerka (yellow card) 86'	Stadium: Městský fotbalový stadion Srbská; Attendance: 2,688; Referee: Petr Hocek

7 August 2021 3	Prostějov	2–0	Zbrojovka Brno	Prostějov
17:00 CEST (UTC+2)	Koudelka 41'; Bala (yellow card) 58'; Žák 61'; Machynek (yellow card) 87'	Report	Řezníček (yellow card) 72'; Fousek (yellow card) 74'; Hrabina (yellow card) 81'	Stadium: Stadion Za Místním nádražím Attendance: 820; Referee: Petr Dorušák

15 August 2021 4	Zbrojovka Brno	4–0	Jihlava	Brno
20:00 CEST (UTC+2)	Řezníček 13', 29', 51', 70'; Moravec (yellow card) 42'	Report	Vlček (yellow card) 89'	Stadium: Městský fotbalový stadion Srbská; Attendance: 2,518; Referee: Ondřej Ginzel

22 August 2021 5	Líšeň	1–2	Zbrojovka Brno	Brno
10:15 CEST (UTC+2)	Lutonský (yellow card) 22'; Kučera (yellow card) 31'; O. Ševčík 56'; Silný (yellow card) 73' (yellow-red card) 79'; Málek (yellow card) 80'; Otrísal (yellow card) 88'	Report	Řezníček (yellow card) 16'; Hladík 49'; Hladík (yellow card) 64'; Endl (yellow card) 66'; Řezníček 90+3'; Čermák (yellow card) 90+4'	Stadium: Stadion SK Líšeň; Attendance: 1,985; Referee: Radek Dubravský

29 August 2021 6	Zbrojovka Brno	2–2	Varnsdorf	Brno
20:00 CEST (UTC+2)	Štěrba (yellow card) 7'; Přichystal (yellow card) 33'; Řezníček 39'; Fousek 77'; Endl (yellow card) 86'	Report	Heppner (yellow card) 63'; Hušek 73'; Bláha 84'; Bláha (yellow card) 90'	Stadium: Městský fotbalový stadion Srbská; Attendance: 2,503; Referee: Tomáš Batík

10 September 2021 7	Příbram	0–1	Zbrojovka Brno	Příbram
17:00 CEST (UTC+2)		Report	Hladík (yellow card) 41'; Čermák (yellow card) 49'; Texl (yellow card) 56'; Řezníček (yellow card) 77'; Ševčík 84'	Stadium: Na Litavce; Attendance: 850; Referee: Zbyněk Proske

19 September 2021 8	Zbrojovka Brno	2–1	Viktoria Žižkov	Brno
20:00 CEST (UTC+2)	Přichystal 23'; Fousek 46'; Přichystal (yellow card) 77'	Report	Endl 34' (o.g.); Koželuh (yellow card) 49'; Řezáč (yellow card) 60'; Súkenník (yellow card) 70'	Stadium: Městský fotbalový stadion Srbská; Attendance: 2,518; Referee: Michal Křepský

24 September 2021 9	Ústí nad Labem	1–6	Zbrojovka Brno	Ústí nad Labem
18:00 CEST (UTC+2)	Brak (yellow card) 12'; Ogiomade 13'; Michal Bílek (yellow card) 42'; Jiránek (yellow card) 45'; Krobot (yellow card) 48'	Report	Přichystal 7', 53'; Texl (yellow card) 27'; Ševčík 37'; Hladík 42'; Sedlák 88'	Stadium: Městský stadion Attendance: 846; Referee: Ondřej Berka

1 October 2021 10	Zbrojovka Brno	2–1	Sparta Prague "B"	Brno
17:00 CEST (UTC+2)	Přichystal 12', 48'; Řezníček (yellow card) 64'	Report	Sejk 47'; Vácha (yellow card) 50'; Šimáček (yellow card) 90'	Stadium: Městský fotbalový stadion Srbská; Attendance: 4,018; Referee: Tomáš Batík

15 October 2021 11	Zbrojovka Brno	2–2	Vyškov	Brno
17:00 CEST (UTC+2)	Fousek 40'; Ševčík (yellow card) 67'; Hladík (yellow card) 83'; Rogožan 90'	Report	M. Vintr 62', 83' (pen.); Fofana (yellow card) 52'; M. Vintr (yellow card) 67'; O. Vintr (yellow card) 81'; Klesa (yellow card) 90'	Stadium: Městský fotbalový stadion Srbská; Attendance: 2,618; Referee: Marek Radina

23 October 2021 12	Třinec	0–1	Zbrojovka Brno	Třinec
10:15 CEST (UTC+2)	Adamuška (yellow card) 35'; Bolf (yellow card) 87'	Report	Štěrba (yellow card) 25'; Řezníček 36' (pen.)	Stadium: Stadion Rudolfa Labaje; Attendance: 293; Referee: Tomáš Ulrich

29 October 2021 13	Zbrojovka Brno	2–1	Vlašim	Brno
17:00 CEST (UTC+2)	Moravec (yellow card) 18'; Texl (yellow card) 23'; Řezníček 25'; Štěrba (yellow card) 52'; Hladík 63'	Report	Alijagič 9'; Broukal (yellow card) 65'; Červenka (yellow card) 73'	Stadium: Městský fotbalový stadion Srbská; Attendance: 2,114; Referee: Pavel Orel

6 November 2021 14	Dukla Prague	1–0	Zbrojovka Brno	Prague
11:00 CEST (UTC+2)	Buchvaldek 11'; Ruml (yellow card) 90'	Report	Zavadil (yellow card) 72'	Stadium: Stadion Juliska; Attendance: 682; Referee: Tomáš Klíma

21 November 2021 15	Zbrojovka Brno	3–2	Chrudim	Brno
14:00 CEST (UTC+2)	Štěrba 6'; Bariš (yellow card) 10'; Endl 45+6'; Endl (yellow card) 35' (yellow-red card) 73'; Řezníček (yellow card) 46'; Moravec (yellow card) 71'; Kohoutek 90+4'	Report	Tkadlec (yellow card) 13' (yellow-red card) 83'; Surmaj 61'; Tkadlec 74'; Surmaj (yellow card) 89'	Stadium: Městský fotbalový stadion Srbská; Attendance: 2,188; Referee: Tomáš Batík

4 December 2021 16	Opava	0–2	Zbrojovka Brno	Opava
13:30 CEST (UTC+2)		Report	Fousek 67'; Řezníček 81'; Sedlák (yellow card) 90'	Stadium: Stadion v Městských sadech Attendance: 710; Referee: Petr Hocek

4 March 2022 17	Zbrojovka Brno	4–1	Prostějov	Brno
17:00 CEST (UTC+2)	Ševčík 29'; Přichystal 37', 50'; Řezníček 90'	Report	Kopřiva (yellow card) 35'; Koudelka 48'; Kušej (yellow card) 66'; Píchal (yellow card) 72'	Stadium: Městský fotbalový stadion Srbská; Attendance: 3,014; Referee: Michal Křepský

11 March 2022 18	Jihlava	0–3	Zbrojovka Brno	Jihlava
15:30 CEST (UTC+2)	Křivánek (yellow card) 39'; Tureček (yellow card) 44'; Belaïd (yellow card) 74'	Report	Blecha 34'; Ševčík (yellow card) 41'; Lacko 62' (o.g.); Řezníček 76' (pen.); Hlavica (yellow card) 90'	Stadium: Stadion v Jiráskově ulici Attendance: 593; Referee: Michael Kvítek

18 March 2022 19	Zbrojovka Brno	1–3	Líšeň	Brno
17:00 CEST (UTC+2)	Endl (yellow card) 49'; Řezníček (yellow card) 63'; Řezníček 72'	Report	Pašek 1'; Ševčík 32'; Matocha (yellow card) 45'; Lutonský 61'	Stadium: Městský fotbalový stadion Srbská; Attendance: 6,118; Referee: Jan Petřík

1 April 2022 21	Zbrojovka Brno	1–0	Příbram	Brno
18:00 CEST (UTC+2)	Bariš 23'; Nečas (yellow card) 87'	Report	Soldát (yellow card) 79'	Stadium: Městský fotbalový stadion Srbská; Attendance: 2,118; Referee: Dalibor Černý

6 April 2022 20	Varnsdorf	0–2	Zbrojovka Brno	Varnsdorf
16:30 CEST (UTC+2)	Rudnytskyi (yellow card) 38'	Report	Štěrba 6'; Přichystal 11'; Šural (yellow card) 30'; Endl (yellow card) 83'; Čermák (yellow card) 85'	Stadium: Městský stadion v Kotlině; Attendance: 510; Referee: Tomáš Švagr

10 April 2022 22	Viktoria Žižkov	0–3	Zbrojovka Brno	Prague
10:15 CEST (UTC+2)	Muleme (yellow card) 30'	Report	Texl (yellow card) 25'; Sakala 27' (o.g.); Přichystal (yellow card) 45+1'; Nečas 49'; Řezníček 65'	Stadium: FK Viktoria Stadion; Attendance: 626; Referee: Jan Petřík

13 April 2022 23	Zbrojovka Brno	2–1	Ústí nad Labem	Brno
19:00 CEST (UTC+2)	Čermák (yellow card) 22'; Fousek 41'; Přichystal 44'; Hrabina (yellow card) 61'	Report	Miskovič (yellow card) 70'; Krobot 77'; Čítek (yellow card) 90+2'	Stadium: Městský fotbalový stadion Srbská; Attendance: 2,523; Referee: Marek Radina

17 April 2022 24	Sparta Prague "B"	1–0	Zbrojovka Brno	Prague
10:30 CEST (UTC+2)	Ryneš 55'; Ambler (yellow card) 61'	Report	Endl (yellow card) 77'	Stadium: Stadion Evžena Rošického; Attendance: 463; Referee: Josef Krejsa

23 April 2022 25	Vyškov	0–2	Zbrojovka Brno	Drnovice
10:15 CEST (UTC+2)	Lahodný (yellow card) 84'; O. Vintr (yellow card) 90+5'; Harušťák (yellow card) 90+5'	Report	Moravec (yellow card) 26'; Fousek (yellow card) 30'; Řezníček 49'; Řezníček (yellow card) 90+4'; Ševčík 90+6'	Stadium: Sportovní areál Drnovice; Attendance: 3,188; Referee: Petr Dorušák

27 April 2022 26	Zbrojovka Brno	4–2	Třinec	Brno
19:00 CEST (UTC+2)	Řezníček 16'; Ševčík (yellow card) 33'; Bedecs 38' (o.g.); Přichystal 67'; Blecha 77'; Texl (yellow card) 80'	Report	Machuča 43'; Habusta 55'; Bedecs (yellow card) 58'	Stadium: Městský fotbalový stadion Srbská; Attendance: 4,522; Referee: Filip Kotala

1 May 2022 27	Vlašim	1–2	Zbrojovka Brno	Vlašim
13:15 CEST (UTC+2)	Suchan 17'; Svoboda (yellow card) 41'; Breda (yellow card) 57'; Vágner (yellow card) 88'; Gning (yellow card) 90+2'	Report	Blecha 6'; Hlavica (yellow card) 21'; Fousek (yellow card) 71'; Řezníček 89' (pen.); Šiman (yellow card) 90+3'	Stadium: Stadion Kollárova ulice Attendance: 663; Referee: Vojtěch Opočenský

8 May 2022 28	Zbrojovka Brno	2–1	Dukla Prague	Brno
17:00 CEST (UTC+2)	Hladík 53'; Jambor (yellow card) 65'; Endl 83'	Report	Skopec (yellow card) 77'; Pázler 90+2'	Stadium: Městský fotbalový stadion Srbská; Attendance: 3,076; Referee: Michael Kvítek

11 May 2022 29	Chrudim	3–2	Zbrojovka Brno	Chrudim
17:00 CEST (UTC+2)	Jan Řezníček 28'; Průcha 70'; Průcha (yellow card) 71'; Štěrba 81' (o.g.); Koželuh (yellow card) 82'; Kesner (yellow card) 85'	Report	Hladík (yellow card) 11'; Blecha (yellow card) 34'; Ševčík 43', 58'	Stadium: Stadion Za Vodojemem; Attendance: 1,020; Referee: Tomáš Ulrich

14 May 2022 30	Zbrojovka Brno	1–1	Táborsko	Brno
17:30 CEST (UTC+2)	Berkovec (yellow card) 62'; Řezníček 66'; Hlavica (yellow card) 69'	Report	Liepa 21'; Holiš (yellow card) 53'	Stadium: Městský fotbalový stadion Srbská; Attendance: 2,588; Referee: Petr Dorušák

=== Czech Cup ===
==== Results ====
11 August 2021 First round	Žďár nad Sázavou	0–4	Zbrojovka Brno	Žďár nad Sázavou
18:00 CEST (UTC+2)	Trojánek (yellow card) 51'; Vitásek (yellow card) 88'	Report	Ševčík 14'; Zikl 38', 61'; Matula 78'	Stadium: Stadion Bouchalky; Attendance: 726; Referee: Dalibor Černý

25 August 2021 Second round	Kroměříž	2–2 (4–5 p)	Zbrojovka Brno	Kroměříž
17:00 CEST (UTC+2)	Červenka (yellow card) 32'; Červenka 35'; Tiahlo (yellow card) 39'; Matoušek (yellow card) 67'; Houser 100'; Houser (yellow card) 115'	Report	Hladík 12'; Kryštůfek (yellow card) 32'; Přichystal (yellow card) 68'; Ševčík 95'	Stadium: Stadion SK Hanácká Slavia Kroměříž; Attendance: 863; Referee: Tomáš Batík
	Penalties
	Houser (penalty scored); Zavadil (penalty scored); Hapal (penalty scored); Tiahlo (penalty scored); Plecitý (penalty missed); Matoušek (penalty missed); Vyhlíd (penalty missed)		(penalty scored) Čermák; (penalty scored) Ševčík; (penalty scored) Štepanovský; (penalty scored) Hlavica; (penalty missed) Matula; (penalty missed) Lacík; (penalty scored) Kryštůfek

6 October 2021 Third round	Varnsdorf	4–2 (a.e.t.)	Zbrojovka Brno	Varnsdorf
15:30 CEST (UTC+2)	Kouřil 24'; Hušek (yellow card) 76'; Kouřil (yellow card) 78'; Hrabina 79' (o.g.); Kocourek 97'; Vaňák (yellow card) 108'; Schön 115'	Report	Kryštůfek (yellow card) 26'; Hladík 45'; Rogožan (yellow card) 54'; Hladík (yellow card) 56'; Přichystal (yellow card) 68'; Řezníček 77'; Texl (yellow card) 104'	Stadium: Městský stadion v Kotlině; Attendance: 710; Referee: Tomáš Ulrich

== Squad statistics ==
=== Appearances and goals ===
No.	Pos	Nat	Player	Total		Fortuna národní liga		MOL Cup	
No.	Pos	Nat	Player	Apps	Goals	Apps	Goals	Apps	Goals
Goalkeepers
53	GK	(Czech Republic) CZE	Martin Berkovec	24	0	24	0	0	0
71	GK	(Czech Republic) CZE	Jakub Šiman	3	0	3	0	0	0
Defenders
3	DF	(Czech Republic) CZE	Jakub Černín	4	0	0+3	0	0+1	0
4	DF	(Czech Republic) CZE	Jan Hlavica	17	0	8+6	0	3	0
6	DF	(Czech Republic) CZE	Lukáš Endl	25	2	14+9	2	1+1	0
15	DF	(Czech Republic) CZE	Jan Štěrba	24	2	23+1	2	0	0
17	DF	(Czech Republic) CZE	Jan Moravec	26	1	16+8	1	1+1	0
22	DF	(Czech Republic) CZE	Matěj Hrabina	24	0	21+1	0	1+1	0
23	DF	(Czech Republic) CZE	Jakub Šural	14	0	10+4	0	0	0
Midfielders
5	MF	(Czech Republic) CZE	David Jambor	6	0	3+3	0	0	0
7	MF	(Czech Republic) CZE	Pavel Zavadil	10	1	6+4	1	0	0
11	MF	(Czech Republic) CZE	Adam Fousek	29	5	20+6	5	3	0
13	MF	(Czech Republic) CZE	Jiří Texl	29	0	18+9	0	2	0
18	MF	(Czech Republic) CZE	Oldřich Pragr	2	0	0+2	0	0	0
19	MF	(Czech Republic) CZE	Michal Ševčík	32	8	23+7	6	2	2
21	MF	(Czech Republic) CZE	Filip Blecha	12	3	10+2	3	0	0
24	MF	(Slovakia) SVK	Peter Štepanovský	24	0	6+16	0	2	0
25	MF	(Czech Republic) CZE	Jakub Nečas	16	1	9+5	1	2	0
27	MF	(Slovakia) SVK	Damián Bariš	29	1	21+5	1	3	0
29	MF	(Slovakia) SVK	Adrián Čermák	22	0	13+7	0	1+1	0
34	MF	(Czech Republic) CZE	Ota Kohoutek	12	1	3+9	1	0	0
41	MF	(Czech Republic) CZE	Miroslav Kamenský	1	0	0+1	0	0	0
90	MF	(Czech Republic) CZE	Ondřej Vaněk	0	0	0	0	0	0
	MF	(Czech Republic) CZE	Fabián Matula	3	1	0	0	0+3	1
Forwards
14	FW	(Czech Republic) CZE	Jakub Přichystal	28	11	24+2	11	0+2	0
20	FW	(Czech Republic) CZE	Jan Hladík	32	6	21+8	4	2+1	2
37	FW	(Czech Republic) CZE	Jakub Řezníček	30	19	27+2	18	1	1
	FW	(Czech Republic) CZE	Lukáš Rogožan	5	1	0+3	1	0+2	0
Players transferred/loaned out during the season
	GK	(Czech Republic) CZE	Jiří Floder	7	0	3+1	0	3	0
	DF	(Czech Republic) CZE	Daniel Kosek	3	0	0+2	0	1	0
	DF	(Czech Republic) CZE	Lukáš Kryštůfek	6	0	3+1	0	2	0
	MF	(Czech Republic) CZE	Barnabáš Lacík	4	0	0+1	0	1+2	0
	MF	(Czech Republic) CZE	Martin Sedlák	10	1	1+6	1	2+1	0
	FW	(Czech Republic) CZE	Martin Zikl	2	2	0+1	0	1	2

Last updated: 26 May 2022
Source: Competitions

=== Goal scorers ===
Rank	No.	Pos	Nat	Name	Fortuna národní liga	MOL Cup	Total
1	37	FW	(Czech Republic)	Jakub Řezníček	10	1	11
2	14	FW	(Czech Republic)	Jakub Přichystal	6	0	6
3	22	FW	(Czech Republic)	Jan Hladík	3	2	5
4	11	MF	(Czech Republic)	Adam Fousek	4	0	4
4	19	MF	(Czech Republic)	Michal Ševčík	2	2	4
6	19	FW	(Czech Republic)	Martin Zikl	0	2	2
7	6	DF	(Czech Republic)	Lukáš Endl	1	0	1
7	7	MF	(Czech Republic)	Pavel Zavadil	1	0	1
7	8	FW	(Czech Republic)	Lukáš Rogožan	1	0	1
7	15	DF	(Czech Republic)	Jan Štěrba	1	0	1
7	17	DF	(Czech Republic)	Jan Moravec	1	0	1
7	30	MF	(Czech Republic)	Martin Sedlák	1	0	1
7	34	MF	(Czech Republic)	Ota Kohoutek	1	0	1
7		MF	(Czech Republic)	Fabián Matula	0	1	1
Own goals					0	0	0
Totals					32	8	40

Last updated: 7 December 2021
Source: Competitions

=== Assists ===
Rank	No.	Pos	Nat	Name	Fortuna národní liga	MOL Cup	Total
1	11	FW	(Czech Republic)	Adam Fousek	5		5
1	19	FW	(Czech Republic)	Michal Ševčík	5	0	5
3	22	FW	(Czech Republic)	Jan Hladík	3	2	5
4	19	MF	(Czech Republic)	Michal Ševčík	2	2	4
5	11	MF	(Czech Republic)	Adam Fousek	3	0	3
6	19	FW	(Czech Republic)	Martin Zikl	0	2	2
7	17	DF	(Czech Republic)	Jan Moravec	1	0	1
7	30	FW	(Czech Republic)	Martin Sedlák	1	0	1
7	8	FW	(Czech Republic)	Lukáš Rogožan	1	0	1
7	7	MF	(Czech Republic)	Pavel Zavadil	1	0	1
7		MF	(Czech Republic)	Fabián Matula	0	1	1
Totals					27	8	35

Last updated: 30 October 2021
Source: Competitions

=== Clean sheets ===
Rank	No.	Pos	Nat	Name	Fortuna národní liga	MOL Cup	Total
1	53	GK	(Czech Republic)	Martin Berkovec	9	0	9
2	59	GK	(Czech Republic)	Jiří Floder	1	1	2
Totals					10	1	11

Last updated: 21 June 2022
Source: Competitions

=== Disciplinary record ===
Number	Nation	Position	Name	Fortuna národní liga		Czech Cup		Total	
Number	Nation	Position	Name	Booked	Sent off (straight red)	Booked	Sent off (straight red)	Booked	Sent off (straight red)
Players away on loan:
Players who left Zbrojovka during the season:
			TOTALS						

Last updated: 10 July 2021
Source: Competitions
