= 2023–24 Czech National Football League =

Czech National Football League
- Season: 2023–24
- Dates: 21 July 2023 – 25 May 2024
- Champions: Dukla
- Promoted: Dukla
- Relegated: Příbram; Kroměříž
- Matches: 240
- Goals: 687 (2.86 per match)
- Top goalscorer: Jakub Řezníček (13 goals)
- Biggest home win: Dukla 6–0 Sparta B 25 May 2024
- Biggest away win: Žižkov 1–5 Dukla; 14 August 2023
- Highest scoring: Jihlava 6–3 Olomouc B 2 August 2023; Vlašim 4–5 Líšeň; 17 April 2024; Chrudim 6–3 Příbram; 27 April 2024
- Longest winning run: Olomouc B (10 matches)
- Longest unbeaten run: Olomouc B (12 matches)
- Longest winless run: Kroměříž (13 matches)
- Longest losing run: Kroměříž (4 matches)

The 2023–24 Czech National Football League (known as the Fortuna národní liga for sponsorship reasons) is the 31st season of the Czech Republic's second tier football league. The season started on 21 July 2023.

The season format was unchanged from the previous season, with each team playing in the league format home and away matches. The top-ranked team was promoted to the Czech First League, the two teams positioned 2nd and 3rd played a play-out with two teams from the first league positioned 14th and 15th in a home and away format. The two lowest-ranked teams were relegated directly to the third tier.

== Team changes ==
=== From FNL ===
- MFK Karviná (promoted to 2023–24 Czech First League)
- FK Třinec (relegated to Moravian-Silesian Football League)
- SK Slavia Prague B (relegated to Bohemian Football League)

=== To FNL ===
- FC Zbrojovka Brno (relegated from 2022–23 Czech First League)
- FK Viktoria Žižkov (promoted from 2022–23 Bohemian Football League)
- SK Hanácká Slavia Kroměříž (promoted from 2022–23 Moravian-Silesian Football League)

== Team overview ==
Location of clubs in the 2023–24 2. Liga

=== Locations and stadiums ===
The home stadium of MFK Vyškov was not certified by the league to host matches. The club opted to play their home league matches for the season at Sportovní areál Drnovice in Drnovice. Due to the modernization of its stadium, 1. SK Prostějov will play the season at Stadion FK Holice of 1. HFK Olomouc instead of Stadion Za Místním nádražím.

| Club | Location | Stadium | Capacity | 2022–23 position |
|---|---|---|---|---|
| FC Zbrojovka Brno | Brno | Městský fotbalový stadion Srbská | 10,200 | 16th in First League |
| MFK Vyškov | Vyškov | Sportovní areál Drnovice | 4,500 | 2nd |
| FK Příbram | Příbram | Na Litavce | 9,100 | 3rd |
| FK Dukla Prague | Prague | Stadion Juliska | 8,150 | 4th |
| SK Líšeň | Brno | Stadion SK Líšeň | 2,000 | 5th |
| FK Varnsdorf | Varnsdorf | Městský stadion v Kotlině | 5,000 | 6th |
| FC Silon Táborsko | Tábor | Stadion v Kvapilově ulici | 1,500 | 7th |
| MFK Chrudim | Chrudim | Za Vodojemem | 1,500 | 8th |
| SK Sigma Olomouc B | Olomouc | Andrův stadion | 12,483 | 9th |
| AC Sparta Prague B | Prague | FK Viktoria Stadion | 3,327 | 10th |
| FC Sellier & Bellot Vlašim | Vlašim | Stadion Kollárova ulice | 3,000 | 11th |
| 1. SK Prostějov | Prostějov | Stadion FK Holice | 2,900 | 12th |
| SFC Opava | Opava | Stadion v Městských sadech | 7,524 | 13th |
| FC Vysočina Jihlava | Jihlava | Stadion v Jiráskově ulici | 4,500 | 14th |
| FK Viktoria Žižkov | Prague | FK Viktoria Stadion | 3,327 | 1st in ČFL |
| SK Hanácká Slavia Kroměříž | Kroměříž | Stadion SK Hanácká Slavia Kroměříž | 1,529 | 1st in MSFL |

== League table ==
| Pos | Team | Pld | W | D | L | GF | GA | GD | Pts | Promotion or relegation |
|---|---|---|---|---|---|---|---|---|---|---|
| 1 | Dukla Prague (C, P) | 30 | 18 | 6 | 6 | 55 | 29 | +26 | 60 | Promotion to Czech First League |
| 2 | Sigma Olomouc B | 30 | 18 | 3 | 9 | 49 | 38 | +11 | 57 (Note: Reserve teams are not eligible to be promoted to the Czech First League.) | |
| 3 | Táborsko | 30 | 13 | 10 | 7 | 41 | 26 | +15 | 49 | Qualification for promotion play-offs |
| 4 | Vyškov | 30 | 13 | 8 | 9 | 45 | 38 | +7 | 47 | Qualification for promotion play-offs |
| 5 | Chrudim | 30 | 11 | 9 | 10 | 49 | 48 | +1 | 42 | |
| 6 | Opava | 30 | 11 | 7 | 12 | 36 | 36 | 0 | 40 | |
| 7 | Vlašim | 30 | 9 | 13 | 8 | 41 | 43 | −2 | 40 | |
| 8 | Viktoria Žižkov | 30 | 11 | 6 | 13 | 44 | 51 | −7 | 39 | |
| 9 | Zbrojovka Brno | 30 | 11 | 6 | 13 | 41 | 42 | −1 | 39 | |
| 10 | Líšeň | 30 | 9 | 12 | 9 | 34 | 34 | 0 | 39 | |
| 11 | Sparta Prague B | 30 | 10 | 7 | 13 | 52 | 58 | −6 | 37 | |
| 12 | Prostějov | 30 | 11 | 4 | 15 | 42 | 52 | −10 | 37 | |
| 13 | Varnsdorf | 30 | 8 | 12 | 10 | 51 | 50 | +1 | 36 | |
| 14 | Vysočina Jihlava | 30 | 9 | 8 | 13 | 42 | 46 | −4 | 35 | |
| 15 | Příbram (R) | 30 | 11 | 4 | 15 | 32 | 43 | −11 | 35 (Note: Příbram was deducted 2 points for thwarting the verdict of the Boards of Referees and non-payment of debts to former players.) | Relegation to 2024–25 ČFL or MSFL |
| 16 | Hanácká Slavia Kroměříž (R) | 30 | 6 | 7 | 17 | 33 | 53 | −20 | 25 | Relegation to 2024–25 ČFL or MSFL |

Source: Fortuna národní liga
Rules for classification: 1) Points; 2) Head-to-head points; 3) Head-to-head goal difference; 4) Head-to-head goals scored; 5) Goal difference; 6) Goals scored; 7) Play-off (if deciding promotion or relegation); 8) Draw
(C) Champions; (P) Promoted; (R) Relegated

== Top scorers ==
| Rank | Player | Club | Goals |
|---|---|---|---|
| 1 | (Czech Republic) Jakub Řezníček | Brno | 13 |
| 2 | (Czech Republic) David Huf | Chrudim | 12 |
| 3 | (The Gambia) Ebrima Singhateh | Vlašim / Olomouc B | 10 |
| 3 | (Serbia) Bojan Djordjić | Táborsko | 10 |
| 3 | (Czech Republic) Radek Šiler | Sparta B | 10 |
| 3 | (Czech Republic) Lukáš Matějka | Dukla | 10 |
| 7 | (Togo) Idjessi Metsoko | Vyškov | 9 |
| 7 | (Czech Republic) Denis Alijagić | Brno | 9 |
| 9 | 6 players | | 8 |

== Attendances ==
| # | Club | Average |
|---|---|---|
| 1 | Zbrojovka | 2,720 |
| 2 | Opava | 1,572 |
| 3 | Dukla | 1,401 |
| 4 | Žižkov | 1,267 |
| 5 | Vyškov | 1,147 |
| 6 | Táborsko | 1,017 |
| 7 | Chrudim | 1,014 |
| 8 | SK HS | 960 |
| 9 | Vysočina | 703 |
| 10 | Příbram | 702 |
| 11 | Líšeň | 648 |
| 12 | Sparta Praha B | 615 |
| 13 | Varnsdorf | 614 |
| 14 | Prostějov | 507 |
| 15 | Vlašim | 450 |
| 16 | Sigma Olomouc B | 334 |

== See also ==
- 2023–24 Czech First League
- 2023–24 Czech Cup
