= 2021–22 Czech National Football League =

Czech National Football League
- Season: 2021–22
- Dates: 23 July 2021 – 14 May 2022
- Champions: Brno
- Promoted: Brno
- Relegated: Ústí nad Labem; Žižkov
- Matches played: 240
- Goals scored: 622 (2.59 per match)
- Top goalscorer: 18 goals Jakub Řezníček
- Biggest home win: Opava 6–1 Žižkov; 23 October 2021
- Biggest away win: Ústí nad Labem 1–6 Brno; 24 September 2021
- Highest scoring: Opava 6–1 Žižkov; Ústí nad Labem 1–6 Brno
- Longest winning run: 5 matches Vlašim
- Longest unbeaten run: 10 matches Brno
- Longest winless run: 25 matches Žižkov
- Longest losing run: 4 matches Chrudim; Žižkov; Ústí nad Labem
- Highest attendance: 4,018; Brno 2–1 Sparta B 1 October 2021
- Lowest attendance: 205; Varnsdorf 0–3 Opava; 24 November 2021
- All statistics correct as of complete.

The 2021–22 Czech National Football League (known as the Fortuna národní liga for sponsorship reasons) is the 29th season of the Czech Republic's second tier football league. Due to positive coronavirus tests on four players and additional players showing symptoms, the 12th and 13th round of matches for Varnsdorf, against Líšeň and Opava, were postponed.

== Team changes ==
=== From FNL ===
- Hradec Králové (promoted to 2021–22 Czech First League)
- Blansko (relegated to Moravian–Silesian Football League)
- Slavoj Vyšehrad (relegated to Prague Championship)

=== To FNL ===
- Brno (relegated from 2020–21 Czech First League)
- Příbram (relegated from 2020–21 Czech First League)
- Opava (relegated from 2020–21 Czech First League)
- Sparta Prague B (promoted from 2020–21 Bohemian Football League)
- Vyškov (promoted from 2020–21 Moravian–Silesian Football League)

== Team overview ==
Location of clubs in the 2021–22 2. Liga

=== Locations and stadiums ===
The home stadium of MFK Vyškov was not certified by the league to host matches. The club opted to play their home league matches for the season at Sportovní areál Drnovice in Drnovice.

Club	Location	Stadium	Capacity	2020–21 Position
Brno	Brno	Srbská	10,200	16th in First League
Příbram	Příbram	Na Litavce	9,100	17th in First League
Opava	Opava	Stadion v Městských sadech	7,758	18th in First League
Líšeň	Brno	Stadion SK Líšeň	2,000	2nd
Prostějov	Prostějov	Stadion Za Místním nádražím	3,500	3rd
Viktoria Žižkov	Prague	FK Viktoria Stadion	5,037	4th
Ústí nad Labem	Ústí nad Labem	Městský stadion (Ústí nad Labem)	4,000	5th
Vlašim	Vlašim	Stadion Kollárova ulice	6,000	6th
Jihlava	Jihlava	Stadion v Jiráskově ulici	4,500	7th
Dukla Prague	Prague	Stadion Juliska	8,150	8th
Třinec	Třinec	Stadion Rudolfa Labaje	2,200	9th
Chrudim	Chrudim	Za Vodojemem	1,500	10th
Táborsko	Sezimovo Ústí	Sportovní areál Soukeník	5,000	11th
Varnsdorf	Varnsdorf	Městský stadion v Kotlině	5,000	12th
Sparta B	Prague	Stadion Evžena Rošického	19,032	1st in ČFL
Vyškov	Drnovice	Sportovní areál Drnovice	6,616	3rd in MSFL

== League table ==
Pos	Team	Pld	W	D	L	GF	GA	GD	Pts	Promotion or relegation
1	Zbrojovka Brno (C, Q)	30	22	3	5	61	29	+32	69	Promotion to 2022–23 Czech First League
2	Vlašim	30	16	5	9	61	39	+22	53	Qualification for promotion play-offs
3	Opava	30	14	9	7	47	33	+14	51	Qualification for promotion play-offs
4	Líšeň	30	14	8	8	45	33	+12	50	
5	Sparta Prague B	30	13	7	10	50	37	+13	46	
6	Varnsdorf	30	13	6	11	47	35	+12	45	
7	Vysočina Jihlava	30	11	9	10	29	34	−5	42	
8	MAS Táborsko	30	10	10	10	33	34	−1	40	
9	Dukla Prague	30	10	9	11	40	41	−1	39	
10	Chrudim	30	9	11	10	32	36	−4	38	
11	Prostějov	30	11	4	15	32	50	−18	37	
12	Vyškov	30	9	8	13	43	44	−1	35	
13	Příbram	30	9	8	13	38	51	−13	35	
14	Fotbal Třinec	30	9	6	15	38	54	−16	33	
15	Ústí nad Labem (R)	30	6	10	14	26	49	−23	28	Relegation to 2022–23 ČFL
16	Viktoria Žižkov (R)	30	3	9	18	20	43	−23	18	Relegation to 2022–23 ČFL

Source: Fortuna národní liga
Rules for classification: 1) Points; 2) Head-to-head points; 3) Head-to-head goal difference; 4) Head-to-head goals scored; 5) Goal difference; 6) Goals scored; 7) Play-off (if deciding promotion or relegation); 8) Draw
(C) Champions; (Q) Qualified for the phase indicated; (R) Relegated

== Top scorers ==
Rank	Player	Club	Goals
1	(Czech Republic) Jakub Řezníček	Brno	18
2	(Serbia) Bojan Djordjić	Varnsdorf	15
3	(Czech Republic) Matyáš Kozák	Sparta B	12
4	(Czech Republic) Denis Alijagić	Vlašim	11
4	(Czech Republic) Jakub Přichystal	Brno	11
4	(Czech Republic) Filip Blecha	Brno	11
4	(Czech Republic) Jaroslav Málek	Líšeň	11
8	(Czech Republic) Ondřej Vintr	Vyškov	10
