= 2024–25 Czech National Football League =

Czech National Football League
- Season: 2024–25
- Dates: 20 July 2024 – 25 May 2025
- Champions: FC Zlín (1st title)
- Promoted: FC Zlín
- Relegated: Sigma Olomouc B, Varnsdorf
- Matches: 240
- Goals: 605 (2.52 per match)
- Top goalscorer: Tomáš Necid (17 goals)
- Biggest home win: Chrudim 6–1 Ostrava B 10 August 2024; Olomouc B 5–0 Ostrava B 25 August 2024
- Biggest away win: Brno 1–6 Varnsdorf; 3 August 2024
- Highest scoring: Žižkov 6–2 Varnsdorf; 25 May 2025

The 2024–25 Czech National Football League (known as the Chance Národní Liga for sponsorship reasons) was the 32nd season of the Czech Republic's second tier football league. The season started on 20 July 2024.

== Format ==
Starting with the 2024–25 season, the league is called "Chance Národní Liga" after its new main sponsor, Chance betting office. The season format is unchanged from last season, each team will play in the league format home and away matches. The top-ranked team was promoted to the Czech First League, the two teams positioned 2nd and 3rd will play a play-out with two teams from the first league positioned 14th and 15th in a home and away format. The two lowest-ranked teams were relegated directly to the third tier.

== Team changes ==
=== From FNL ===
- FK Dukla Prague (promoted to the 2024–25 Czech First League)
- SK Hanácká Slavia Kroměříž (relegated to the Moravian-Silesian Football League)
- FK Příbram (relegated to the Bohemian Football League)

=== To FNL ===
- FC Zlín (relegated from the 2023–24 Czech First League)
- SK Slavia Prague B (promoted from the 2023–24 Bohemian Football League)
- FC Baník Ostrava B (promoted from the 2023–24 Moravian-Silesian Football League)

== Team overview ==
Location of clubs in the 2024–25 league

=== Locations and stadiums ===
The home stadium of MFK Vyškov was not certified by the league to host matches. The club opted to play their home league matches for the season at Sportovní areál Drnovice in Drnovice.

After eight rounds played, the SFC Opava's stadium was damaged due to the 2024 Central European floods. The club played the rest of the autumn part of the competition at the stadium of FC Hlučín. The club will play the spring part of the competition at the stadium of FC Dolní Benešov.

Club	Location	Stadium	Capacity	2023–24 position
FC Zlín	Zlín	Letná Stadion	5,898	16th in First League
SK Sigma Olomouc B	Olomouc	Andrův stadion	12,483	2nd
FC Silon Táborsko	Tábor	Stadion v Kvapilově ulici	1,500	3rd
MFK Vyškov	Vyškov	Sportovní areál Drnovice	4,500	4th
MFK Chrudim	Chrudim	Za Vodojemem	1,500	5th
SFC Opava	Opava	Stadion v Městských sadech	7,524	6th
FC Sellier & Bellot Vlašim	Vlašim	Stadion Kollárova ulice	3,000	7th
FK Viktoria Žižkov	Prague	eFotbal Arena	3,327	8th
FC Zbrojovka Brno	Brno	Městský fotbalový stadion Srbská	10,200	9th
SK Líšeň	Brno	Stadion SK Líšeň	2,000	10th
AC Sparta Prague B	Prague	eFotbal Arena	3,327	11th
1. SK Prostějov	Prostějov	Stadion Za Místním nádražím	3,500	12th
FK Varnsdorf	Varnsdorf	Městský stadion v Kotlině	5,000	13th
FC Vysočina Jihlava	Jihlava	Stadion v Jiráskově ulici	4,500	14th
SK Slavia Prague B	Prague	Stadion Olympia Radotín	1,500	1st in ČFL
FC Baník Ostrava B	Ostrava	Městský stadion (Ostrava)	15,123	1st in MSFL

== League table ==
Pos	Team	Pld	W	D	L	GF	GA	GD	Pts	Promotion or relegation
1	Zlín (C, P)	30	21	8	1	45	14	+31	71	Promotion to 2025–26 Czech First League
2	Chrudim	30	15	8	7	47	30	+17	53	Qualification for promotion play-offs
3	Vyškov	30	12	10	8	33	24	+9	46	Qualification for promotion play-offs
4	Táborsko	30	11	8	11	34	30	+4	41	
5	Sparta Prague B	30	10	10	10	41	39	+2	40 (Note: Head to head points: Sparta Prague B 6, Vlašim 0.)	
6	Vlašim	30	9	13	8	43	39	+4	40	
7	Zbrojovka Brno	30	9	12	9	39	41	−2	39 (Note: Head to head points: Zbrojovka Brno 7, Líšeň 5, Viktoria Žižkov 4.)	
8	Líšeň	30	9	12	9	31	35	−4	39	
9	Viktoria Žižkov	30	11	6	13	51	49	+2	39	
10	Vysočina Jihlava	30	8	13	9	35	39	−4	37 (Note: Head to head points: Vysočina Jihlava 6, Slavia Prague B 5, Prostějov 5.)	
11	Slavia Prague B	30	9	10	11	41	37	+4	37	
12	Prostějov	30	9	10	11	31	42	−11	37	
13	Opava	30	9	9	12	29	39	−10	36	
14	Baník Ostrava B	30	9	7	14	35	46	−11	34	
15	Varnsdorf (R)	30	8	8	14	39	47	−8	32	Relegation to 2025–26 ČFL or MSFL
16	Sigma Olomouc B (R)	30	6	6	18	31	54	−23	24	Relegation to 2025–26 ČFL or MSFL

Source: Chance Národní Liga
Rules for classification: 1) Points; 2) Head-to-head points; 3) Head-to-head goal difference; 4) Head-to-head goals scored; 5) Goal difference; 6) Goals scored; 7) Play-off (if deciding promotion or relegation); 8) Draw
(C) Champions; (P) Promoted; (R) Relegated

== Top scorers ==
Final standings

Rank	Player	Club	Goals
1	(Czech Republic) Tomáš Necid	Žižkov	17
2	(Czech Republic) Filip Lehký	Vlašim	12
3	(Czech Republic) David Látal	Chrudim / Ostrava B	10
4	(Serbia) Vukadin Vukadinović	Zlín	9
4	(Czech Republic) David Tkáč	Zlín	9
6	(Czech Republic) Roman Potočný	Brno / Líšeň	8
6	(Czech Republic) Adam Kronus	Brno	8
6	(Czech Republic) Jakub Selnar	Jihlava	8
6	(Czech Republic) Jan Silný	Líšeň	8

== Attendances ==
#	Club	Average
1	Zlín	2,210
2	Zbrojovka	1,846
3	Žižkov	1,438
4	Chrudim	978
5	Opava	936
6	Vyškov	899
7	Líšeň	840
8	Prostějov	782
9	Táborsko	750
10	Sparta Praha B	643
11	Vysočina	632
12	Baník Ostrava B	569
13	Varnsdorf	518
14	Slavia Praha B	518
15	Vlašim	418
16	Sigma Olomouc B	305

== See also ==
- 2024–25 Czech First League
- 2024–25 Czech Cup
