= Michal Ševčík =

Czech footballer (born 2002)

Personal information
- Date of birth: 13 August 2002 (age 24)
- Place of birth: Třebíč, Czech Republic
- Height: 1.81 m (5 ft 11 in)
- Position: Midfielder

Team information
- Current team: Legia Warsaw (on loan from Sparta Prague)
- Number: 23

Youth career
- 2008−2013: Fotbalová škola Třebíč
- 2013: Třebíč
- 2013−2014: Velké Meziříčí
- 2014−2017: Fotbalová škola Třebíč
- 2017−2020: Zbrojovka Brno

Senior career*
Years	Team	Apps	(Gls)
2020−2023	Zbrojovka Brno	65	(15)
2020−2021	→ Vysočina Jihlava (loan)	11	(1)
2023–	Sparta Prague	5	(1)
2023–2024	Sparta Prague B	11	(3)
2024–2025	→ 1. FC Nürnberg (loan)	3	(1)
2024	→ 1. FC Nürnberg II (loan)	2	(0)
2025–2026	→ Mladá Boleslav (loan)	45	(10)
2026–	→ Legia Warsaw (loan)	8	(2)
2026–	→ Legia Warsaw II (loan)	2	(0)

International career
2017–2018	Czech Republic U16	4	(0)
2019	Czech Republic U17	5	(2)
2019	Czech Republic U18	2	(1)
2019	Czech Republic U19	2	(0)
2021–	Czech Republic U20	2	(0)
2021–2024	Czech Republic U21	8	(1)
- * Club domestic league appearances and goals as of 00:34, 18 October 2026 (UTC)

Michal Ševčík (born 13 August 2002) is a Czech professional footballer who plays as a midfielder for Ekstraklasa club Legia Warsaw, on loan from Sparta Prague.

== Club career ==
=== Zbrojovka Brno ===
Ševčík made his professional debut for Zbrojovka Brno in a home match against Sigma Olomouc on 20 September 2020, which ended in a 4–2 loss. After 66 minutes, he replaced Jan Koudelka.

=== Sparta Prague ===
On 19 June 2023, Ševčík signed for recently crowned Czech First League champions Sparta Prague having impressed the previous season, despite Brno's relegation.

==== Nürnberg (loan) ====
On 25 June 2024, Ševčík joined 1. FC Nürnberg on a one-year loan deal with option to make transfer permanent.

==== Mladá Boleslav (loan) ====
On 28 January 2025, Ševčík joined Mladá Boleslav on a half-year loan deal without option.

==== Legia Warsaw (loan) ====
On 10 July 2026, Ševčík joined Polish club Legia Warsaw on a one-year loan with a conditional option to make the transfer permanent.

== Career statistics ==
As of match played 14 August 2026

Appearances and goals by club, season and competition
Club	Season	League			National cup (Note: Includes Czech Cup, DFB-Pokal)		Continental		Other		Total	
Club	Season	Division	Apps	Goals	Apps	Goals	Apps	Goals	Apps	Goals	Apps	Goals
Zbrojovka Brno	2020–21	Czech First League	1	0	0	0	—		—		1	0
Zbrojovka Brno	2021–22	Czech National Football League	30	6	2	2	—		—		32	8
Zbrojovka Brno	2022–23	Czech First League	34	9	3	1	—		—		37	10
Zbrojovka Brno	Total		65	15	5	3	—		—		70	18
Vysočina Jihlava (loan)	2020–21	Czech National Football League	11	1	0	0	—		—		11	1
Sparta Prague	2023–24	Czech First League	5	1	3	2	0	0	—		8	3
1. FC Nürnberg (loan)	2024–25	2. Bundesliga	3	1	1	1	—		—		4	2
Mladá Boleslav (loan)	2024–25	Czech First League	14	1	1	0	—		—		15	1
Mladá Boleslav (loan)	2025–26	Czech First League	31	9	4	2	—		—		35	11
Mladá Boleslav (loan)	Total		45	10	5	2	—		—		50	12
Legia Warsaw (loan)	2026–27	Ekstraklasa	1	1	0	0	—		—		1	1
Legia Warsaw II (loan)	2026–27	II liga	2	0	—		—		—		2	0
Career total			132	29	14	8	0	0	0	0	146	37

== Honours ==
Sparta Prague

- Czech First League: 2023–24
- Czech Cup: 2023–24
