= Ahmed Fofana =

Ivorian footballer

Personal information
- Full name: Ahmed Fofana
- Date of birth: 13 June 2000 (age 26)
- Place of birth: Abidjan, Ivory Coast
- Height: 1.99 m (6 ft 6 in)
- Positions: Centre back; centre forward

Senior career*
Years	Team	Apps	(Gls)
	Korhogo	?	(?)
2020–2022	Chrudim	24	(2)
2021	→ Vyškov (loan)	13	(3)
2022	→ Pohronie (loan)	6	(0)
2022–2023	Amiens B	8	(0)
- * Club domestic league appearances and goals as of 22:29, 9 January 2024 (UTC)

Ahmed Fofana (born 13 June 2000) is an Ivorian footballer who last played for Amiens B.

== Career ==
=== MFK Chrudim ===
Fofana arrived in Europe in winter of 2020, following a selection by his agency and Hlinsko manager Daniel Sigan. Before signing his first contract outside of Ivory Coast, Fofana was in unsuccessful trials in Waregem, Antwerp and with the Czech Czech Fortuna Liga side of FK Teplice. Following individual training sessions under Sigan at Hnilsko, he was signed by Jaroslav Veselý of MFK Chrudim, competing in the Czech second division.

He debuted in the Czech National Football League on 30 May 2020 at eFotbal Aréna against Viktoria Žižkov. Fofana was booked in the first half and Chrudim won the match through a first half goal by David Sixta. He scored his first goal for Chrudim almost a year later, on 24 April 2021, beating Filip Mucha of Prostějov following a corner kick, to secure one point for Chrudim, after a 1–1 tie at za Místním Nádražím. Following his first goal, Fofana revealed that his positional play during corners and free kicks was a subject to extra training prior to the match and he commented positively on his experience during his second season at Chrudim, during which he became a more regular feature in the team.

=== FK Pohronie ===
Fofana made his Slovak Fortuna Liga debut for Pohronie on 12 February 2022 in an away fixture at na Sihoti in a 3–0 defeat. Fofana came on to replace Miloš Lačný at half-time and witnessed two goals by Eduvie Ikoba, which brought the score from 1–0 to the final 3–0. He also appeared in a match against reigning champions Slovan Bratislava at Mestský štadión Žiar nad Hronom, where Pohronie was 3–0 up at half-time but conceded 4 goals in first 15 minutes of the second half to lost 3–4. Fofana played the entirety of the match and conceded a yellow card late in the match. Late stoppage time in stoppage time, Fofana had the opportunity to equalise but was denied by Matúš Ružinský.

== Style of play ==
While at Chrudim, Fofana was described as a relying on strength and power. Due to his height, he was compared to Czech international top scorer Jan Koller. Jan Trousil, who managed Fofana during a loan spell at Vyškov, described him as "athletic" and "resistant". Following his arrival at Pohronie his versatility in offence and defence was highlighted as an advantage.

== Personal life ==
Per his social media communications, Fofana is a Muslim. Fofana originates from the Ivorian capital of Abidjan and is Francophone. His idols included Yaya Touré and Didier Drogba.
