= 2020–21 Czech National Football League =

Czech National Football League
- Champions: FC Hradec Králové
- Promoted: FC Hradec Králové
- Relegated: Slavoj Vyšehrad, FK Blansko
- Matches: 182
- Goals: 473 (2.6 per match)
- Top goalscorer: Jaroslav Málek (13 goals)
- Biggest home win: Dukla Prague 5–0 Ústí nad Labem
- Biggest away win: Třinec 0–5 Jihlava
- Highest scoring: Prostějov 3–5 Vlašim, Chrudim 3–5 Žižkov

The 2020–21 Czech National Football League (known as the Fortuna národní liga for sponsorship reasons) is the 28th season of the Czech Republic's second tier football league. The league was played with 14 clubs due to uneven promotion/relegation with the Czech First League at the end of the previous season.

Two matches in the third round of fixtures were postponed due to coronavirus concerns. Eight players from Vyšehrad tested positive, resulting in their match against Táborsko having to be played at a later date. Due to players from Vlašim's A, B and junior teams testing positive, their away match against Třinec could not be played on the originally scheduled date either.

== Team changes ==
=== From FNL ===
- FK Pardubice (promoted to 2020–21 Czech First League)
- FC Zbrojovka Brno (promoted to 2020–21 Czech First League)
- FK Baník Sokolov (relegated to Bohemian Football League)
- MFK Vítkovice (relegated to Czech Fourth Division, group F)

=== To FNL ===
- Táborsko (promoted from 2019–20 Bohemian Football League)
- Blansko (promoted from 2019–20 Moravian–Silesian Football League)

== Team overview ==
Location of clubs in the 2020–21 2. Liga

=== Locations and stadiums ===
The home stadium of FK Viktoria Žižkov was not certified by the league to host matches. The club opted to play their home league matches for the autumn part of the season at Stadion SK Prosek in Prague.

Club	Location	Stadium	Capacity	2019–20 Position
Dukla Prague	Prague	Stadion Juliska	8,150	3rd
Hradec Králové	Hradec Králové	Všesportovní stadion	7,220	4th
Viktoria Žižkov	Prague	Stadion SK Prosek	1,000	5th
Jihlava	Jihlava	Stadion v Jiráskově ulici	4,500	6th
Ústí nad Labem	Ústí nad Labem	Městský stadion (Ústí nad Labem)	4,000	7th
Vlašim	Vlašim	Stadion Kollárova ulice	6,000	8th
Líšeň	Brno	Stadion SK Líšeň	2,000	9th
Chrudim	Chrudim	Za Vodojemem	1,500	10th
Prostějov	Prostějov	Stadion Za Místním nádražím	3,500	11th
Vyšehrad	Prague	Stadion Evžena Rošického	19,032	12th
Třinec	Třinec	Stadion Rudolfa Labaje	2,200	13th
Varnsdorf	Varnsdorf	Městský stadion v Kotlině	5,000	14th
Táborsko	Sezimovo Ústí	Sportovní areál Soukeník	5,000	1st in ČFL
Blansko	Blansko	Stadion na Údolní	1,200	1st in MSFL

== League table ==
Pos	Team	Pld	W	D	L	GF	GA	GD	Pts	Promotion or relegation
1	Hradec Králové (C, P)	26	17	7	2	51	22	+29	58	Promotion to 2021–22 I. liga
2	Líšeň	26	13	11	2	43	24	+19	50	
3	Prostějov	26	12	7	7	40	35	+5	43	
4	Viktoria Žižkov	26	13	3	10	42	38	+4	42	
5	Ústí nad Labem	26	12	5	9	24	29	−5	41	
6	Vlašim	26	10	7	9	38	33	+5	37	
7	Vysočina Jihlava	26	9	8	9	44	44	0	35	
8	FK Dukla Prague	26	9	7	10	36	30	+6	34	
9	Fotbal Třinec	26	9	6	11	32	33	−1	33	
10	Chrudim	26	9	4	13	33	36	−3	31	
11	Táborsko	26	8	7	11	25	28	−3	31	
12	FK Varnsdorf	26	6	12	8	20	27	−7	30	
13	Blansko (R)	26	7	6	13	30	34	−4	27	Relegation to 2021–22 MSFL
14	Slavoj Vyšehrad (R)	26	1	4	21	15	60	−45	7	Relegation to 2021–22 ČFL

Source: Fortuna národní liga
Rules for classification: 1) Points; 2) Head-to-head points; 3) Head-to-head goal difference; 4) Head-to-head goals scored; 5) Goal difference; 6) Goals scored; 7) Play-off (if deciding promotion or relegation); 8) Draw
(C) Champions; (P) Promoted; (R) Relegated

== Top scorers ==
Rank	Player	Club	Goals
1	(Czech Republic) Jaroslav Málek	Líšeň	13
2	(Czech Republic) Ladislav Mužík	Chrudim	12
3	(Czech Republic) Jaroslav Diviš	Žižkov	10
3	(Czech Republic) Pavel Dvořák	Hradec Králové	10
5	(Slovakia) Erik Prekop	Hradec Králové	9
5	(Czech Republic) Marek Červenka	Vlašim	9
