= Artem Kovernikov =

Ukrainian footballer

Personal information
- Full name: Artem Oleksiyovych Kovernikov
- Date of birth: 1 July 2000 (age 26)
- Height: 1.90 m (6 ft 3 in)
- Position: Defender

Youth career
- –2014: Atlet Kyiv
- 2015–2017: Arsenal Kyiv
- 2017–2019: Dukla Prague

Senior career*
Years	Team	Apps	(Gls)
2019–2022	Dukla Prague	36	(1)
- * Club domestic league appearances and goals as of 30 June 2022

Artem Oleksiyovych Kovernikov (Ukrainian: Арте́м Олексійович Коверніков; born 1 July 2000) is a Ukrainian football defender who played for Dukla Prague.

== Career statistics ==
=== Club ===
As of 30 June 2022.

Club	Season	League			Cup		Other		Total	
Club	Season	Division	Apps	Goals	Apps	Goals	Apps	Goals	Apps	Goals
Dukla Prague	2019–20	Fortuna národní liga	1	0	0	0	0	0	1	0
Dukla Prague	2020–21	Fortuna národní liga	16	0	0	0	0	0	16	0
Dukla Prague	2021–22	Fortuna národní liga	19	1	0	0	0	0	19	1
Career total			36	1	0	0	0	0	36	1
