= 2022–23 Czech First League =

Czech First League
- Season: 2022–23
- Dates: 30 July 2022 – 28 May 2023
- Champions: Sparta Prague
- Relegated: Zbrojovka Brno
- Champions League: Sparta Prague
- Europa League: Slavia Prague
- Europa Conference League: Viktoria Plzeň; Bohemians 1905
- Matches: 276
- Goals: 819 (2.97 per match)
- Top goalscorer: Václav Jurečka (20 goals)
- Biggest home win: Slavia 7–0 Pardubice; 21 August 2022
- Biggest away win: Teplice 0–5 Ostrava; 5 February 2023
- Highest scoring: Bohemians 1905 2–6 Sparta; 12 February 2023
- Longest winning run: Sparta (9 matches)
- Longest unbeaten run: Sparta (21 matches)
- Longest winless run: Teplice (8 matches)
- Longest losing run: Pardubice (7 matches)
- Highest attendance: 19,370; Slavia 4–0 Sparta; 23 October 2022
- Lowest attendance: 550; Hradec Králové 0–0 Jablonec; 18 September 2022

The 2022–23 Czech First League, known as the FORTUNA:LIGA for sponsorship reason, is the 30th season of the Czech Republic's top-tier football for professional clubs since its 1993 establishment. FC Viktoria Plzeň are the reigning champions. The season started on 30 July 2022. The first half of the season will have 16 rounds, finishing on 13 November 2022 because of the 2022 FIFA World Cup, and the other half will commence on 28 January 2023. The season is expected to end on 28 May 2023 with two extra play-out fixtures on 1 and 4 June 2023.

The season format is unchanged from last season, 16 clubs play each other home and away, until the league is split up in championship, play-off and relegation groups. The lowest-ranked team was relegated directly to the second league, the two teams positioned 14th and 15th played a play-out with two teams from the second league positioned 2nd and 3rd in a home and away format. This was the fifth season to use VAR, featuring it in all matches played. The year-to-year changes in the format of the competition are only cosmetic, the most significant change being the increase of the number of substitutes permitted on the substitute bench to 11.

== Teams ==
Locations of the 2022–23 Czech First League teams

=== Promotion and relegation (pre-season) ===
A total of sixteen teams contested the league, including fifteen sides from the 2021–22 season and the winner of last season's second league.

Team promoted to Czech First League

After being relegated in the 2020–21 season, Zbrojovka Brno returned to Czech First League as the champion of the 2021–22 Czech National Football League.

Teams relegated from Czech First League

The lowest positioned team from the last season, MFK Karviná, was relegated to the Czech National Football League. The 14th-placed Bohemians 1905 and 15th-placed FK Teplice successfully defended their spots in the first league by winning the relegation play-offs.

=== Locations and stadiums ===
Team	Location	Stadium	Capacity	Ref.
Bohemians 1905	Prague	Ďolíček	6,300	
FC Zbrojovka Brno	Brno	Srbská	12,550	
SK Dynamo České Budějovice	České Budějovice	Stadion Střelecký ostrov	6,681	
FC Hradec Králové	Hradec Králové	Lokotrans Aréna (Note: Hradec Králové played their home matches in Mladá Boleslav due to the rebuilding of their own Všesportovní stadion.)	5,000	
FK Jablonec	Jablonec nad Nisou	Stadion Střelnice	6,108	
FC Slovan Liberec	Liberec	Stadion u Nisy	9,900	
FK Mladá Boleslav	Mladá Boleslav	Lokotrans Aréna	5,000	
SK Sigma Olomouc	Olomouc	Andrův stadion	12,483	
FC Baník Ostrava	Ostrava	Městský stadion (Ostrava)	15,123	
FC Viktoria Plzeň	Plzeň	Doosan Arena	11,700	
SK Slavia Prague	Prague	Fortuna Arena	19,370	
1. FC Slovácko	Uherské Hradiště	Městský fotbalový stadion Miroslava Valenty	8,000	
AC Sparta Prague	Prague	epet ARENA	18,944	
FK Teplice	Teplice	Na Stínadlech	18,221	
FC Trinity Zlín	Zlín	Letná Stadion	5,783	
FK Pardubice	Pardubice	CFIG Arena (Note: Pardubice played the first half of the season in Ďolíček due to the rebuilding of their stadium.)	4,600	

Rank	Region	Number of teams	Club(s)
1	Prague	3	Bohemians 1905, Sparta Prague, Slavia Prague
2	Liberec	2	Jablonec, Slovan Liberec
2	Zlín	2	Trinity Zlín, Slovácko
4	Central Bohemian	1	Mladá Boleslav
4	Hradec Králové	1	Hradec Králové
4	Moravian-Silesian	1	Baník Ostrava
4	Olomouc	1	Sigma Olomouc
4	Pardubice	1	Pardubice
4	Plzeň	1	Viktoria Plzeň
4	South Bohemian	1	Dynamo České Budějovice
4	South Moravian	1	Zbrojovka Brno
4	Ústí nad Labem	1	Teplice

== Managerial changes ==
Ahead of the season:

Team	Outgoing manager	Manner of departure	Date of vacancy	Replaced by	Date of appointment	Contract valid until
Sparta Prague	(Czech Republic) Michal Horňák	End of contract	18 May 2022	(Denmark) Brian Priske	31 May 2022	Undisclosed

During the season:

Team	Outgoing manager	Manner of departure	Date of vacancy	Match-week	Position in table	Replaced by	Date of appointment	Contract valid until
Pardubice	(Czech Republic) Jiří Krejčí & Jaroslav Novotný	Sacked	29 August 2022	5	16th	(Czech Republic) Radoslav Kováč	13 September 2022	June 2024
Baník Ostrava	(Czech Republic) Pavel Vrba	Mutual consent	10 October 2022	11	14th	(Czech Republic) Pavel Hapal	12 October 2022	Undisclosed
Dynamo České Budějovice	(Czech Republic) Jozef Weber	Sacked	31 October 2022	14	14th	(Czech Republic) Marek Nikl & Tomáš Zápotočný	13 November 2022	Undisclosed
Trinity Zlín	(Czech Republic) Jan Jelínek	Sacked	14 November 2022	16	15th	(Czech Republic) Pavel Vrba	28 November 2022	Undisclosed
Teplice	(Czech Republic) Jiří Jarošík	Sacked	4 March 2023	22	14th	(Slovakia) Zdenko Frťala	6 March 2023	Undisclosed
Zbrojovka Brno	(Czech Republic) Richard Dostálek	Sacked	11 April 2023	26	13th	(Czech Republic) Martin Hašek	11 April 2023	Undisclosed

== Regular season ==
=== League table ===
Pos	Team	Pld	W	D	L	GF	GA	GD	Pts	Qualification or relegation
1	Sparta Prague	30	20	8	2	70	29	+41	68	Qualification for the championship group
2	Slavia Prague	30	20	6	4	81	25	+56	66	Qualification for the championship group
3	Viktoria Plzeň	30	17	6	7	55	29	+26	57	Qualification for the championship group
4	Bohemians 1905	30	14	6	10	53	49	+4	48	Qualification for the championship group
5	Slovácko	30	13	7	10	36	38	−2	46	Qualification for the championship group
6	Sigma Olomouc	30	10	11	9	45	40	+5	41	Qualification for the championship group
7	Slovan Liberec	30	10	8	12	39	43	−4	38	Qualification for the play-off
8	Hradec Králové	30	11	5	14	34	40	−6	38	Qualification for the play-off
9	Mladá Boleslav	30	9	10	11	39	42	−3	37	Qualification for the play-off
10	České Budějovice	30	10	5	15	35	54	−19	35	Qualification for the play-off
11	Jablonec	30	9	8	13	46	57	−11	35	Qualification for the relegation group
12	Baník Ostrava	30	9	8	13	43	42	+1	35	Qualification for the relegation group
13	Teplice	30	8	8	14	38	63	−25	32	Qualification for the relegation group
14	Zbrojovka Brno	30	8	7	15	40	56	−16	31	Qualification for the relegation group
15	Pardubice	30	8	4	18	29	58	−29	28	Qualification for the relegation group
16	Trinity Zlín	30	5	11	14	37	55	−18	26	Qualification for the relegation group

Source: Fortuna Liga
Rules for classification: 1) Points; 2) Head-to-head points; 3) Head-to-head goal difference; 4) Head-to-head goals scored; 5) Goal difference; 6) Goals scored; 7) Fair-play ranking; 8) Draw.

=== Results ===
Home \ Away	BOH	BRN	CBU	HKR	JAB	LIB	MLA	OLO	OST	PCE	PLZ	SLA	SLO	SPA	TEP	ZLN
Bohemians 1905	—	1–1	1–2	1–2	4–1	0–2	4–0	1–1	3–3	2–0	1–1	1–4	1–0	2–6	2–0	3–2
Zbrojovka Brno	1–2	—	1–1	1–2	1–2	3–0	3–1	2–3	2–1	2–1	1–3	0–4	2–2	0–4	2–2	1–1
České Budějovice	1–0	3–2	—	0–3	5–1	0–2	0–2	0–3	2–1	3–1	0–1	1–0	2–2	0–2	0–3	2–2
Hradec Králové	0–2	2–1	2–1	—	1–4	1–2	0–1	1–0	0–0	1–3	1–2	1–0	1–2	0–2	4–1	0–0
Jablonec	0–3	3–1	3–0	3–0	—	1–1	1–2	2–2	1–1	1–0	0–3	2–3	1–1	1–1	4–1	2–2
Slovan Liberec	1–3	3–1	1–1	2–0	2–0	—	1–3	2–2	0–0	1–1	0–1	2–2	0–1	1–3	5–1	1–0
Mladá Boleslav	4–3	0–0	2–2	1–2	2–2	4–0	—	1–1	1–0	0–1	0–0	1–1	1–1	1–3	3–0	1–1
Sigma Olomouc	2–2	0–2	3–0	2–2	3–0	1–1	2–0	—	1–4	2–2	2–3	2–0	1–2	1–1	1–2	2–1
Baník Ostrava	4–1	1–2	1–2	0–2	1–2	0–0	3–1	0–3	—	3–0	2–1	0–2	3–1	0–3	1–2	3–1
Pardubice	0–1	1–3	0–2	1–0	1–0	2–1	0–3	0–2	1–1	—	1–1	0–2	3–1	0–2	3–1	2–1
Viktoria Plzeň	1–2	4–0	2–1	1–2	3–2	2–1	2–0	1–1	3–1	2–1	—	3–0	3–0	0–1	1–1	3–0
Slavia Prague	3–0	2–0	6–1	1–1	5–1	3–0	2–1	4–0	3–1	7–0	2–1	—	2–0	4–0	6–0	4–1
Slovácko	2–4	1–0	1–0	1–0	0–2	1–2	2–1	0–0	0–1	1–0	2–0	1–1	—	1–1	2–1	3–0
Sparta Prague	1–1	3–1	1–0	2–1	3–0	1–2	4–1	2–0	1–1	5–2	2–1	3–3	4–0	—	4–1	0–0
Teplice	0–1	1–1	0–2	1–0	3–2	2–1	1–1	2–1	0–5	5–1	2–2	1–1	1–3	2–2	—	0–0
Trinity Zlín	4–1	2–3	5–1	2–2	2–2	2–1	0–0	0–1	1–1	2–1	0–3	0–4	0–2	2–3	2–1	—

Source: Fortuna Liga
Legend: Blue = home team win; Yellow = draw; Red = away team win.
For upcoming matches, an "a" indicates there is an article about the rivalry between the two participants.

== Championship group ==
Points and goals were carried over in full from the regular season.

Pos	Team	Pld	W	D	L	GF	GA	GD	Pts	Qualification or relegation	SPA	SLA	PLZ	BOH	SLO	OLO
1	Sparta Prague (C)	35	23	9	3	76	33	+43	78	Qualification for the Champions League third qualifying round	—	3–2	0–1	2–1	—	—
2	Slavia Prague	35	24	6	5	98	31	+67	78	Qualification for the Europa League third qualifying round (Note: Slavia Prague qualified for the Europa League as Czech Cup winners.)	—	—	2–1	6–0	4–0	—
3	Viktoria Plzeň	35	18	7	10	60	38	+22	61	Qualification for the Europa Conference League second qualifying round	—	—	—	0–2	2–2	1–3
4	Bohemians 1905	35	15	7	13	56	58	−2	52	Qualification for the Europa Conference League second qualifying round	—	—	—	—	0–0	0–1
5	Slovácko	35	13	11	11	40	46	−6	50		0–0	—	—	—	—	2–2
6	Sigma Olomouc	35	12	12	11	53	47	+6	48		0–1	2–3	—	—	—	—

Source: Fortuna Liga
Rules for classification: 1) Total points; 2) Points earned in regular season; 3) Head-to-head points (regular season); 4) Head-to-head goal difference (regular season); 5) Head-to-head goals scored (regular season); 5) Goal difference (all matches); 6) Goals scored (all matches); 7) Fair-play ranking; 8) Draw.
(C) Champions

== Play-off ==
Because only four teams advance to the European Cups from the Czech First League due to a low national coefficient, the winner of the play-off will only receive a cash bonus and a bye in the third round of the 2023–24 Czech Cup.

First round
Mladá Boleslav	0	0	0
Hradec Králové	0	2	2
České Budějovice	3	0	3
Slovan Liberec	2	4	6

Second round
Hradec Králové	0	3	3
Slovan Liberec	4	2	6

== Relegation group ==
Points and goals were carried over in full from the regular season.

Pos	Team	Pld	W	D	L	GF	GA	GD	Pts	Qualification or relegation	OST	TEP	JAB	PCE	ZLN	BRN
11	Baník Ostrava	35	11	9	15	53	50	+3	42		—	2–1	—	2–4	—	4–0
12	Teplice	35	11	9	15	45	67	−22	42		—	—	—	1–0	2–1	1–1
13	Jablonec	35	10	10	15	49	63	−14	40		1–1	0–2	—	—	—	1–0
14	Pardubice (O)	35	11	4	20	38	63	−25	37	Qualification for the relegation play-offs	—	—	2–0	—	1–2	—
15	Trinity Zlín (O)	35	7	13	15	43	60	−17	34	Qualification for the relegation play-offs	2–1	—	1–1	—	—	—
16	Zbrojovka Brno (R)	35	8	9	18	41	64	−23	33	Relegation to FNL	—	—	—	0–2	0–0	—

Source: Fortuna Liga
Rules for classification: 1) Total points; 2) Points earned in regular season; 3) Head-to-head points (regular season); 4) Head-to-head goal difference (regular season); 5) Head-to-head goals scored (regular season); 5) Goal difference (all matches); 6) Goals scored (all matches); 7) Fair-play ranking; 8) Draw.
(O) Play-off winners; (R) Relegated

== Relegation play-offs ==
Teams placed 14th and 15th in the relegation group faced the teams placed 2nd and 3rd in the Czech National Football League for two spots in the next season.

Team 1	Agg.	Team 2	1st leg	2nd leg
Viagem Příbram	0–2	Pardubice	0–2	0–0
Trinity Zlín	1–0	Vyškov	1–0	0–0

=== Matches ===
All times Central European Summer Time (UTC+2)

1 June 2023
17:30

Viagem Příbram	0–2	Pardubice
		Sychra 49'; Janošek 62' (pen.)

Na Litavce, Příbram
Attendance: 3,500
Referee: Ondřej Berka
4 June 2023
17:00

Pardubice	0–0	Viagem Příbram

CFIG Arena, Pardubice
Attendance: 4,350
Referee: Miroslav Zelinka

Pardubice won 2–0 on aggregate.

1 June 2023
17:30

Trinity Zlín	1–0	Vyškov
Dramé 64'

Letná Stadion, Zlín
Attendance: 5,442
Referee: Dalibor Černý
4 June 2023
17:00

Vyškov	0–0	Trinity Zlín

Sportovní areál Drnovice, Vyškov
Attendance: 4,500
Referee: Ondřej Berka

Trinity Zlín won 1–0 on aggregate.

== Season statistics ==
=== Top scorers ===
Final standing

Rank	Player	Club	Goals
1	(Czech Republic) Václav Jurečka	Slavia	20
2	(Czech Republic) Jakub Řezníček	Brno	19
3	(Czech Republic) Jan Chramosta	Jablonec	15
4	(Netherlands) Mick van Buren	Liberec / Slavia	14
4	(Czech Republic) Jan Kuchta	Sparta	14
6	(Czech Republic) Tomáš Chorý	Plzeň	13
6	(Czech Republic) Ladislav Krejčí	Sparta	13
8	(Czech Republic) Tomáš Čvančara	Sparta	12
8	(Czech Republic) Mojmír Chytil	Olomouc	12
10	(Czech Republic) Roman Květ	Bohemians 1905 / Plzeň	11
10	(Nigeria) Peter Olayinka	Slavia	11
10	(Czech Republic) Stanislav Tecl	Slavia	11
10	(Czech Republic) Ondřej Lingr	Slavia	11
10	(Nigeria) Muhamed Tijani	Ostrava	11

=== Top assists ===
Final standing

Rank	Player	Club	Assists
1	(Czech Republic) Marek Matějovský	Mladá Boleslav	9
2	(Denmark) Casper Højer Nielsen	Sparta	8
3	(Czech Republic) Stanislav Tecl	Slavia	7
3	(Czech Republic) Jakub Hora	České Budějovice	7
3	(Czech Republic) Robert Hrubý	Zlín	7
3	(Serbia) Nemanja Kuzmanović	Ostrava	7
3	(Czech Republic) David Jurásek	Slavia	7

=== Hat-tricks ===
Matchweek	Date	Player	For	Against	Result
2	6 August 2022	(Netherlands) Mick van Buren	Liberec	Teplice	5–1 (H)
4	21 August 2022	(Czech Republic) Stanislav Tecl	Slavia	Pardubice	7–0 (H)
10	2 October 2022	(Czech Republic) Filip Žák	Teplice	Pardubice	5–1 (H)
11	9 October 2022	(Czech Republic) Roman Květ	Bohemians 1905	Slovácko	4–2 (A)
13	22 October 2022	(Czech Republic) Jakub Řezníček	Brno	Pardubice	3–1 (A)
30	30 April 2023	(Nigeria) Muhamed Tijani	Ostrava	Olomouc	4–1 (A)
31	7 May 2023	(Czech Republic) Václav Jurečka^{4}	Slavia	Bohemians 1905	6–0 (H)
35	27 May 2023	(Czech Republic) Václav Jurečka^{4}	Slavia	Slovácko	4–0 (H)

Notes

^{4} Player scored 4 goals
(H) – Home team
(A) – Away team

=== Clean sheets ===
Final standing

Rank	Player	Club	Clean sheets
1	(Czech Republic) Filip Nguyen	Slovácko	11
2	(Czech Republic) Ondřej Kolář	Slavia	10
2	(Czech Republic) Matěj Kovář	Sparta	10
2	(Czech Republic) Jindřich Staněk	Plzeň	10
5	(Czech Republic) Jan Šeda	Mladá Boleslav	6
5	(Czech Republic) Michal Reichl	Hradec Králové	6
5	(Czech Republic) Jakub Trefil	Olomouc	6
8	(Belgium) Olivier Vliegen	Liberec	5
8	(Czech Republic) Martin Jedlička	Bohemians 1905	5
8	(Czech Republic) Jan Hanuš	Jablonec	5

== Attendances ==
Rank	Club	Average	Highest
1	Slavia Praha	14,729	19,370
2	Sparta Praha	14,347	18,305
3	Viktoria Plzeň	8,577	11,103
4	Baník Ostrava	6,808	13,099
5	Zbrojovka Brno	5,778	10,200
6	Bohemians	5,046	6,088
7	Slovácko	4,910	8,000
8	Sigma Olomouc	4,431	9,364
9	Teplice	3,749	10,555
10	České Budějovice	3,400	6,681
11	Zlín	3,312	5,112
12	Slovan Liberec	3,081	7,258
13	Pardubice	2,809	4,620
14	Jablonec	2,379	5,238
15	Mladá Boleslav	2,213	4,851
16	Hradec Králové	1,533	5,000

== See also ==
- 2022–23 Czech Cup
- 2022–23 Czech National Football League
