= Jan Štěrba (disambiguation) =

Jan Štěrba may refer to:

- Jan Štěrba (born 1981), Czech sprint canoeist
- Jan Štěrba (footballer, born 1994), Czech footballer
