= Jan Štěrba (footballer, born 1994) =

Czech footballer

Personal information
- Full name: Jan Štěrba
- Date of birth: 8 July 1994 (age 32)
- Place of birth: Ostrava, Czech Republic
- Height: 1.86 m (6 ft 1 in)
- Position: Centre-back

Team information
- Current team: Artis Brno
- Number: 15

Youth career
- 2001-2003: Frýdlant nad Ostravicí
- 2003–2006: Frýdek-Místek
- 2006–2009: Baník Ostrava
- 2009–2014: Sigma Olomouc

Senior career*
| Years | Team | Apps | (Gls) |
| 2014–2022 | Sigma Olomouc | 79 | (5) |
| 2017–2018 | → Karviná (loan) | 5 | (0) |
| 2021–2022 | → Zbrojovka Brno (loan) | 24 | (2) |
| 2022–2024 | Zbrojovka Brno | 18 | (1) |
| 2024 | → Prostějov (loan) | 11 | (1) |
| 2024–2025 | Vyškov | 19 | (0) |
| 2025– | Artis Brno | 11 | (0) |
- * Club domestic league appearances and goals as of 24 May 2026

Jan Štěrba (born 8 July 1994) is a Czech professional footballer who plays as a centre-back for Artis Brno.

On 22 February 2024, Zbrojovka Brno loaned Štěrba to Prostějov until the end of the season.

On 25 June 2024, Štěrba signed a contract with Vyškov.

On 16 June 2025, Štěrba signed a one-year contract with Artis Brno.
