= Martin Sedlák =

Czech footballer

Personal information
- Full name: Martin Sedlák
- Date of birth: 4 April 2000 (age 26)
- Place of birth: Vyškov, Czech Republic
- Height: 1.80 m (5 ft 11 in)
- Position: Midfielder

Team information
- Current team: Zbrojovka Brno
- Number: 30

Youth career
- 2006−2007: Drnovice
- 2007–2009: Vyškov
- 2009–: Zbrojovka Brno

Senior career*
Years	Team	Apps	(Gls)
2020−	Zbrojovka Brno	10	(2)
2020	→ Kroměříž (loan)	7	(0)

International career^{‡}
2018	Czech Republic U-18	2	(0)
- * Club domestic league appearances and goals as of 20 December 2021 ‡ National team caps and goals as of 30 June 2020

Martin Sedlák (born 4 April 2000) is a Czech footballer who currently plays as a midfielder for Kroměříž on loan from Zbrojovka Brno.

== Club career ==
=== FC Zbrojovka Brno ===
He made his professional debut for Zbrojovka Brno in the home match against Viktoria Žižkov on 28 June 2020. He replaced Antonín Růsek in the 78th minute of the match and after 2 minutes he scored his premiere goal and helped his team to 6–1 win.
