= Václav Svoboda =

Czech footballer (born 1999)

Personal information
- Full name: Václav Svoboda
- Date of birth: 16 September 1999 (age 27)
- Place of birth: Czech Republic
- Height: 1.81 m (5 ft 11 in)
- Position: Right-back

Team information
- Current team: Jiskra Domažlice

Youth career
- –2018: Plzeň

Senior career*
Years	Team	Apps	(Gls)
2018–2021	Plzeň B		
2019	Plzeň	0	(0)
2020–2021	Příbram	16	(0)
2021–2022	Senica	18	(2)
2022–2023	Chrudim		
2023–	Jiskra Domažlice		
- * Club domestic league appearances and goals as of 10 July 2022

Václav Svoboda (born 16 September 1999) is a Czech footballer who plays as a right-back.

== Club career ==
Svoboda made his professional Czech First League debut for 1. FK Příbram against FK Teplice on 22 August 2020.
