= Lukáš Endl =

Czech footballer (born 2003)

Personal information
- Full name: Lukáš Endl
- Date of birth: 17 June 2003 (age 23)
- Place of birth: Brno, Czech Republic
- Height: 1.91 m (6 ft 3 in)
- Position: Centre-back

Team information
- Current team: Karviná

Youth career
- 2009−2010: TJ Sokol Bílovice nad Svitavou
- 2010–2011: ČAFC Židenice
- 2011–2015: TJ Sokol Bílovice nad Svitavou
- 2015–2017: FC Svratka Brno
- 2017–2020: Zbrojovka Brno

Senior career*
Years	Team	Apps	(Gls)
2020−2024	Zbrojovka Brno	79	(3)
2024−	Karviná	16	(0)
2025–2026	→ Ružomberok (loan)	16	(1)

International career
2017–2018	Czech Republic U-15	11	(2)
2018–2019	Czech Republic U16	6	(0)
2019–2020	Czech Republic U17	7	(0)
2021–2022	Czech Republic U19	6	(0)
2021–2022	Czech Republic U20	2	(0)
2023	Czech Republic U21	2	(0)
- * Club domestic league appearances and goals as of 25 May 2026

Lukáš Endl (born 17 June 2003) is a Czech professional footballer who plays as a centre-back for Karviná.

== Club career ==
=== Zbrojovka Brno ===
He made his professional debut for Zbrojovka Brno in the away match against Varnsdorf on 24 June 2020, which ended in a 1–0 win.

=== Karviná ===
On 9 July 2024, Endl signed a multi-year contract with Karviná.

==== Ružomberok (loan) ====
On 15 August 2025, Endl joined Slovak club Ružomberok on a one-year loan deal.
