= Michal Klesa =

Czech footballer

Personal information
- Date of birth: 13 May 1983 (age 43)
- Place of birth: Prague, Czechoslovakia
- Height: 1.85 m (6 ft 1 in)
- Position: Midfielder

Team information
- Current team: MFK Vyškov
- Number: 10

Youth career
- 1990–1994: Sokol Běchovice
- 1994–1997: SK Újezd nad Lesy
- 1997: SC Horní Počernice
- 1998–2002: Bohemians Praha

Senior career*
Years	Team	Apps	(Gls)
2002–2003	Sokol Semice		
2003–2004	Viktoria Sibřina		
2004	Bohemians Praha	14	(2)
2005–2011	1. FK Příbram	122	(11)
2007	→ Zenit Čáslav (loan)	12	(2)
2011–2017	České Budějovice	133	(15)
2017–2018	FK Slavoj	11	(2)
2018–2019	FK Zbuzany 1953		
2019–	MFK Vyškov	73	(11)
- * Club domestic league appearances and goals as of 20 June 2023

Michal Klesa (born 13 May 1983) is a Czech professional footballer who plays for Czech National Football League side MFK Vyškov as a midfielder.

He joined České Budějovice on 1 July 2011 after a 6-year spell in 1. FK Příbram.
