= Jakub Habusta =

Czech footballer

Personal information
- Date of birth: 3 May 1993 (age 33)
- Place of birth: Czech Republic
- Height: 1.87 m (6 ft 2 in)
- Position: Midfielder

Team information
- Current team: Prostějov
- Number: 21

Senior career*
Years	Team	Apps	(Gls)
2013–2017	Sigma Olomouc	21	(0)
2014	→ Frýdek-Místek (loan)		
2015	→ Opava (loan)	10	(0)
2015–2016	→ Sigma Olomouc II	21	(2)
2017–2019	Odra Opole	47	(4)
2019–2020	GKS Katowice	28	(0)
2020–2023	Fotbal Třinec	68	(6)
2023–	Prostějov	70	(8)

International career
2011	Czech Republic U18	4	(0)
2011–2012	Czech Republic U19	7	(1)
2013	Czech Republic U21	1	(0)
- * Club domestic league appearances and goals as of 28 May 2026

Jakub Habusta (born 3 May 1993) is a Czech professional footballer who plays as a midfielder for Prostějov.
