= Lukáš Rogožan =

Czech footballer

Personal information
- Full name: Lukáš Rogožan
- Date of birth: 1 December 1999 (age 26)
- Place of birth: Vyškov, Czech Republic
- Position: Winger

Youth career
- 2007−2015: Vyškov
- 2015−2017: Zbrojovka Brno
- 2017−2018: Vyškov
- 2018−2019: Zbrojovka Brno

Senior career*
| Years | Team | Apps | (Gls) |
| 2019−2020 | Vyškov | 1 | (0) |
| 2020−2023 | Zbrojovka Brno | 16 | (1) |

International career^{‡}
| 2016 | Czech Republic U-17 | 2 | (1) |
- * Club domestic league appearances and goals as of 25 May 2023 ‡ National team caps and goals as of 16 October 2021

Lukáš Rogožan (born 1 December 1999) is a Czech footballer who played as a forward for FC Zbrojovka Brno.

== Club career ==
=== FC Zbrojovka Brno ===
He made his professional debut for Zbrojovka Brno in the home match against Vyškov on 15 October 2021, which ended in a 2–2 draw. He scored his first goal for the club in the 90th minute, equalising for 2-2.
