= Barnabáš Lacík =

Czech footballer

Personal information
- Full name: Barnabáš Lacík
- Date of birth: 6 May 2002 (age 24)
- Place of birth: Brno, Czech Republic
- Height: 1.86 m (6 ft 1 in)
- Position: Midfielder

Team information
- Current team: SFC Opava
- Number: 9

Youth career
- 2008−2010: TJ Sokol Lovčičky
- 2010−2012: TJ Sokol Otnice
- 2012−2013: FC Sparta Brno
- 2014−2021: Zbrojovka Brno

Senior career*
Years	Team	Apps	(Gls)
2021−2022	Zbrojovka Brno	1	(0)
2022−2025	MFK Vyškov	77	(6)
2023−2024	→ Sellier & Bellot Vlašim (loan)	9	(1)
2025−	SFC Opava	24	(1)
- * Club domestic league appearances and goals as of 28 May 2026

Barnabáš Lacík (born 6 May 2002) is a Czech footballer who currently plays as a midfielder for SFC Opava.

== Club career ==
=== FC Zbrojovka Brno ===
He made his professional debut for Zbrojovka Brno in the away match against Ústí nad Labem on 26 September 2021, which ended in a win 6:1. After 78 minutes he replaced Jan Hladík.
