= Jakub Přichystal =

Czech footballer

Personal information
- Date of birth: 25 October 1995 (age 31)
- Place of birth: Brno, Czech Republic
- Height: 1.78 m (5 ft 10 in)
- Position: Winger

Team information
- Current team: Artis Brno B

Youth career
- 2001–2013: Sparta Brno
- 2013–2014: Zbrojovka Brno

Senior career*
Years	Team	Apps	(Gls)
2013–2015	Zbrojovka Brno B	42	(16)
2015–2022	Zbrojovka Brno	117	(30)
2015	→ Vyškov (loan)	8	(1)
2016	→ Opava (loan)	13	(1)
2018	→ Frýdek-Místek (loan)	10	(0)
2018	→ Líšeň (loan)	15	(13)
2023–2025	Sigma Olomouc	2	(0)
2023	→→ Sigma Olomouc B	7	(1)
2024	→ Opava (loan)	4	(1)
2024	→→ Sigma Olomouc B	2	(0)
2025–	Artis Brno	0	(0)
2025–	→→ Artis Brno B	0	(0)
- * Club domestic league appearances and goals as of 3 January 2025

Jakub Přichystal (born 25 October 1995) is a Czech football player who currently plays for Artis Brno B.

On 17 January 2024, Přichystal joined Opava on half-year loan without option.

On 13 January 2025, Přichystal signed a contract with Líšeň.
