= Lukáš Kryštůfek =

Czech footballer (born 1992)

Personal information
- Date of birth: 15 August 1992 (age 34)
- Place of birth: Humpolec, Czechoslovakia
- Height: 1.85 m (6 ft 1 in)
- Position: Defender

Youth career
- 2009–2011: Vysočina Jihlava

Senior career*
Years	Team	Apps	(Gls)
2012–2017	Vysočina Jihlava	50	(0)
2013–2014	→ Vlašim (loan)	28	(0)
2018–2022	Zbrojovka Brno	50	(0)
- * Club domestic league appearances and goals

Lukáš Kryštůfek (born 15 August 1992) is a Czech retired footballer who played as a defender.
