= Jan Moravec =

Czech footballer

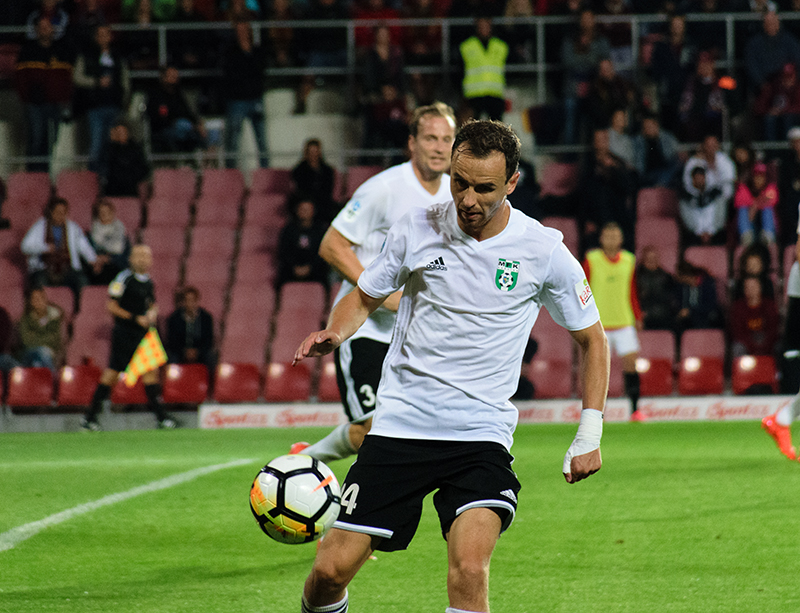

Personal information
- Full name: Jan Moravec
- Date of birth: 13 July 1987 (age 39)
- Place of birth: Svitavy, Czechoslovakia
- Height: 1.78 m (5 ft 10 in)
- Positions: Right back; right winger

Team information
- Current team: FC Zbrojovka Brno
- Number: 14

Youth career
- 1994–1996: SK Rohozná
- 1996–2001: TJ Svitavy
- 2001–2006: Bohemians 1905

Senior career*
| Years | Team | Apps | (Gls) |
| 2006–2015 | Bohemians 1905 | 186 | (12) |
| 2009 | → Kladno (loan) | 6 | (0) |
| 2015–2016 | → Karviná (loan) | 24 | (6) |
| 2016–2020 | Karviná | 89 | (2) |
| 2020– | Zbrojovka Brno | 44 | (1) |
- * Club domestic league appearances and goals as of 31 January 2022

Jan Moravec (born 13 July 1987) is a Czech footballer who plays for FC Zbrojovka Brno.
