= Ondřej Vintr =

Czech footballer

Personal information
- Date of birth: 1 August 1997 (age 29)
- Place of birth: Brno, Czech Republic
- Height: 1.85 m (6 ft 1 in)
- Position: Left midfielder

Team information
- Current team: Vyškov
- Number: 22

Youth career
- 2003−2009: Bučovice
- 2009−2014: Zbrojovka Brno
- 2014−2015: Vyškov
- 2015−2017: Zbrojovka Brno

Senior career*
Years	Team	Apps	(Gls)
2014–2020	Zbrojovka Brno	14	(2)
2014−2015	→ Vyškov (loan)	8	(1)
2015−2016	→ Líšeň (loan)	3	(0)
2017	→ Líšeň (loan)	9	(3)
2018	→ Vyškov (loan)	15	(9)
2019−2020	→ Líšeň (loan)	18	(1)
2020−	Vyškov	66	(20)
- * Club domestic league appearances and goals as of 20 June 2023

Ondřej Vintr (born 1 August 1997) is a Czech football player who currently plays for MFK Vyškov.

== Club career ==
=== FC Zbrojovka Brno ===
He made his professional debut for Zbrojovka Brno against Fastav Zlín on 5 August 2017.
