= Jakub Šiman =

Czech footballer

Personal information
- Full name: Jakub Šiman
- Date of birth: 7 January 1995 (age 31)
- Place of birth: Plzeň, Czech Republic
- Height: 1.97 m (6 ft 6 in)
- Position: Goalkeeper

Team information
- Current team: Bohemians 1905
- Number: 71

Youth career
- 2001−2002: TJ Holoubkov
- 2002−2008: FC Rokycany
- 2008−2015: Viktoria Plzeň

Senior career*
| Years | Team | Apps | (Gls) |
| 2015−2020 | Viktoria Plzeň | 0 | (0) |
| 2016 | → Jiskra Domažlice (loan) | 21 | (0) |
| 2017 | → Baník Sokolov (loan) | 4 | (0) |
| 2017−2018 | → Jiskra Domažlice (loan) | 31 | (0) |
| 2018 | → Olympia Prague (loan) | 7 | (0) |
| 2019 | → Táborsko (loan) | 13 | (0) |
| 2019 | → Baník Sokolov (loan) | 8 | (0) |
| 2020−2021 | Příbram | 25 | (0) |
| 2022 | Viktoria Plzeň | 0 | (0) |
| 2022 | → Zbrojovka Brno (loan) | 3 | (0) |
| 2022−2024 | Zbrojovka Brno | 5 | (0) |
| 2024− | Bohemians 1905 | 0 | (0) |
| 2024− | Bohemians 1905 B | 17 | (0) |

International career^{‡}
| 2011 | Czech Republic U-16 | 3 | (0) |
| 2011−2012 | Czech Republic U17 | 2 | (0) |
| 2013 | Czech Republic U19 | 1 | (0) |
- * Club domestic league appearances and goals as of 26 May 2026 ‡ National team caps and goals as of 2 August 2022

Jakub Šiman (born 7 January 1995) is a Czech footballer who plays as a goalkeeper for Bohemians 1905.

In February 2024, Šiman signed a contract with Czech First League club Bohemians 1905.
