= Jakub Řezníček =

Czech footballer (born 1988)

Personal information
- Date of birth: 26 May 1988 (age 38)
- Place of birth: Příbram, Czechoslovakia
- Height: 1.86 m (6 ft 1 in)
- Position: Striker

Youth career
- Příbram

Senior career*
Years	Team	Apps	(Gls)
2006–2007	Příbram	6	(0)
2007–2015	Mladá Boleslav	75	(15)
2009–2010	→ Ružomberok (loan)	9	(1)
2012–2013	→ České Budějovice (loan)	34	(5)
2013–2015	→ Příbram (loan)	42	(16)
2015	→ Sparta Prague (loan)	8	(0)
2015–2017	Zbrojovka Brno	58	(20)
2017–2019	Viktoria Plzeň	22	(2)
2018	→ Sigma Olomouc (loan)	12	(6)
2019	Lokeren	4	(1)
2019–2021	Teplice	43	(13)
2021–2024	Zbrojovka Brno	95	(51)
2024–2025	Dukla Prague	20	(3)
2025–2026	Příbram	15	(2)
2026	Příbram B	14	(2)

International career
2006	Czech Republic U18	5	(1)
2007	Czech Republic U19	1	(0)
2008	Czech Republic U21	4	(1)
- * Club domestic league appearances and goals as of 17 September 2026

Jakub Řezníček (born 26 May 1988) is a Czech retired footballer who played as a striker. He recorded the most appearances and goals for FC Zbrojovka Brno. He became a member of the Czech League Goalscorers' Club for players who have scored 100 or more top tier league goals. At the international level, he represented the Czech Republic U21 national team.

== Club career ==
In September 2009, Řezníček joined Ružomberok of the Slovak First Football League, scoring in the Slovak Cup on his competitive debut for the club after just two minutes in a 3–1 win against MFK Banská Bystrica. He scored his first league goal for the club in a 1–0 win against FC Nitra in October of the same year.

On 15 August 2024, Řezníček signed a one-year contract with Dukla Prague of the Czech First League, to try and score the last two goals he needs to join the prestigious League Scorers Club for scorers of 100 or more goals in the top competitions. On 19 October 2024, Řezníček scored his 100th top-flight goal in a 2–1 home win against FK Pardubice in the Czech First League.

In June 2025, Řezníček joined Czech National Football League club Příbram.

On 17 September 2026, Řezníček announced his retirement from professional football on his social media.

== Honours ==
Řezníček became the top scorer of the 2021–22 and 2023–24 seasons of the Czech National Football League.

Řezníček was awarded as the striker of the 2022–23 Czech First League season by League Football Association (LFA), after he became the second best scorer of the season.

== Family ==
Řezníček is the half brother of Martin Jedlička, who is also a professional footballer.
