= Jan Koudelka =

Czech footballer (born 1992)

Personal information
- Full name: Jan Koudelka
- Date of birth: 12 March 1992 (age 34)
- Place of birth: Boskovice, Czechoslovakia
- Height: 1.76 m (5 ft 9 1/2 in)
- Position: Midfielder

Team information
- Current team: Prostějov
- Number: 70

Youth career
- 2001–2007: Boskovice
- 2007–2010: Sigma Olomouc
- 2011: Líšeň

Senior career*
Years	Team	Apps	(Gls)
2012–2013	Líšeň		
2012–2013	→ Vysočina Jihlava "B" (loan)	19	(3)
2013–2016	Boskovice		
2013	→ Zábřeh (loan)	1	(0)
2014	→ Blansko (loan)		
2014–2016	→ Prostějov (loan)	43	(8)
2016–2017	Blansko	13	(5)
2017	Boskovice		
2017	SC Melk		
2017–2018	Vyškov	13	(6)
2018–	Prostějov	224	(45)
2020	→ Zbrojovka Brno (loan)	7	(0)
- * Club domestic league appearances and goals as of 28 May 2026

Jan Koudelka (born 12 March 1992) is a Czech professional footballer who plays for Prostějov.
