= Pavlo Rudnytskyy =

Ukrainian footballer (born 1988)

Personal information
- Full name: Pavlo Omelyanovych Rudnytskyy
- Date of birth: 13 July 1988 (age 38)
- Place of birth: Ukrainian SSR
- Height: 1.69 m (5 ft 7 in)
- Position: Midfielder

Senior career*
Years	Team	Apps	(Gls)
2006–2008	Teplice	0	(0)
2008–2010	Ústí nad Labem	41	(5)
2010–	Varnsdorf	365	(45)
- * Club domestic league appearances and goals

Pavlo Rudnytskyy (Ukrainian: Павло Омелянович Рудницький; born 13 July 1988) is a Ukrainian retired professional footballer who played as a midfielder. He spent his almost entire career in the Czech club Varnsdorf, which competed in the Czech National Football League. He has 365 caps for Varnsdorf.
