= Filip Blecha =

Czech footballer

Personal information
- Full name: Filip Blecha
- Date of birth: 16 July 1997 (age 29)
- Place of birth: Prague, Czech Republic
- Height: 1.81 m (5 ft 11 in)
- Position: Midfielder

Team information
- Current team: Arsenal Česká Lípa

Youth career
- 2003−2015: Bohemians 1905

Senior career*
Years	Team	Apps	(Gls)
2015−2019	Bohemians 1905	1	(0)
2017−2018	→ Táborsko (loan)	21	(0)
2018−2019	→ Vlašim (loan)	18	(0)
2019−2022	Vlašim	61	(10)
2022−2023	Slavia Praha	0	(0)
2022−2023	→ Zbrojovka Brno (loan)	34	(3)
2023−2025	Opava	55	(9)
2025−2026	Zbrojovka Brno	11	(0)
2026−	Arsenal Česká Lípa	0	(0)

International career^{‡}
2014	Czech Republic U18	1	(1)
2016	Czech Republic U19	2	(0)
2017−2018	Czech Republic U20	3	(2)
- * Club domestic league appearances and goals as of 28 May 2026 ‡ National team caps and goals as of 2 August 2022

Filip Blecha (born 16 July 1997) is a Czech football player who plays for Arsenal Česká Lípa.
