= Drnovice (Vyškov District) =

- Municipality
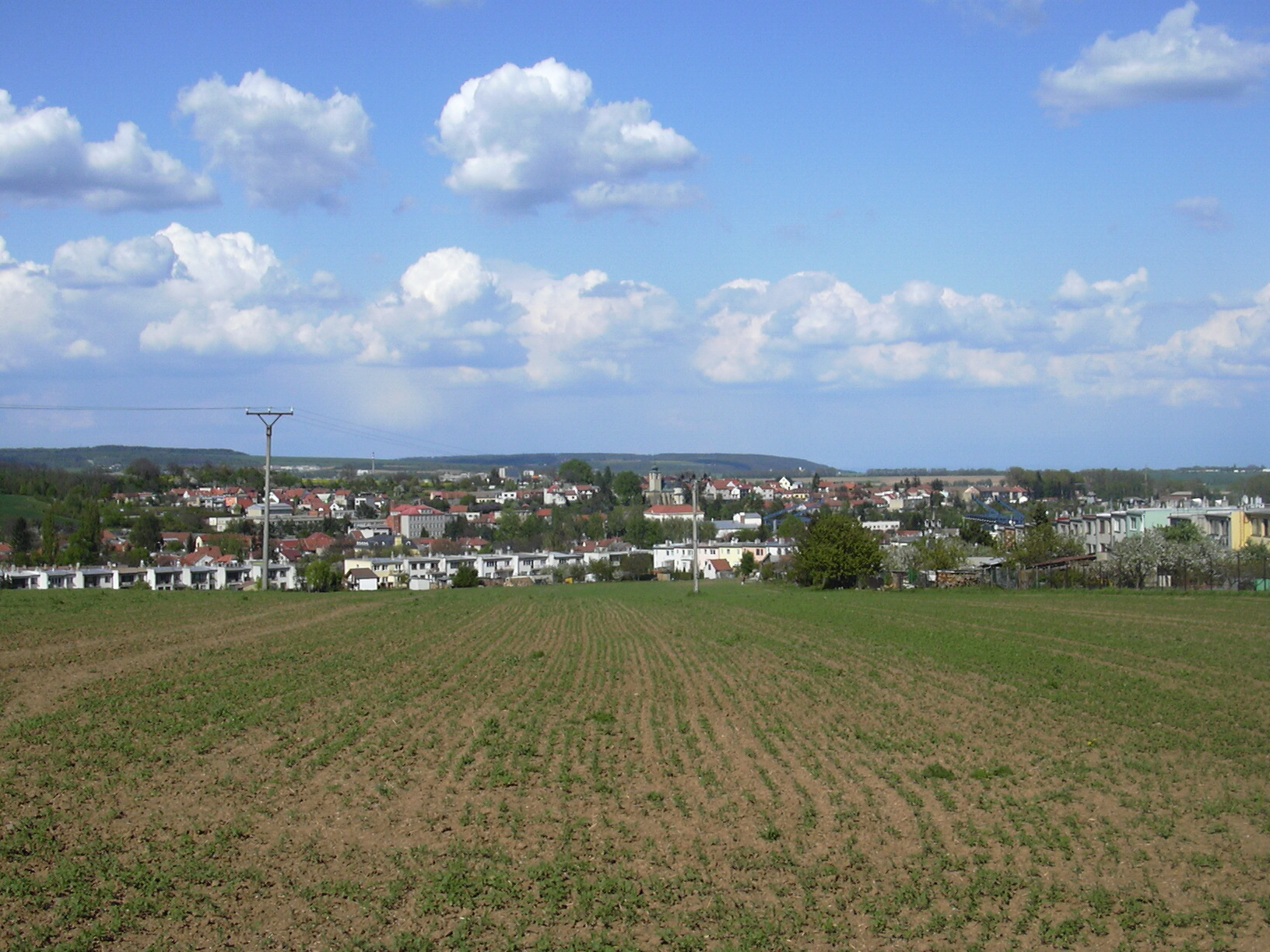
- General view of Drnovice

- Flag Coat of arms

- Location in the Czech Republic
- Coordinates: 49°16′35″N 16°57′5″E
- Country: Czech Republic
- Region: South Moravian
- District: Vyškov
- First mentioned: 1104

Area
  - Total: 11.97 km^{2} (4.62 sq mi)
- Elevation: 256 m (840 ft)

Population (2026-01-01)
  - Total: 2,403
  - Density: 200.8/km^{2} (519.9/sq mi)
- Time zone: UTC+1 (CET)
  - Summer (DST): UTC+2 (CEST)
- Postal code: 683 04
- Website: www.oudrnovice.cz

Drnovice (Czech pronunciation: [ˈdr̩novɪtsɛ]; German: Drnowitz) is a municipality and village in Vyškov District in the South Moravian Region of the Czech Republic. It has about 2,400 inhabitants.

== Etymology ==
The name is derived from the personal name Drn, meaning "the village of Drn's people".

== Geography ==
Drnovice is located about 3 kilometres (2 mi) west of Vyškov and 22 km (14 mi) east of Brno. It lies on the border between the Vyškov Gate and Drahany Highlands, on the edge of the fertile Haná region. The highest point is the hill Rozepře at 451 m (1,480 ft) above sea level. A dominant feature of the landscape near the village is the hill Chocholík at 367 m (1,204 ft). The Drnůvka Stream flows through the municipality.

== History ==
The first written mention of Drnovice is from 1104, when it was a property of the Benedictine monastery in Třebíč. From the 13th century until the second half of the 19th century, it was part of the Račice estate.

== Demographics ==
Historical population

Year	Pop.	±%
1869	1,256	—
1880	1,399	+11.4%
1890	1,474	+5.4%
1900	1,783	+21.0%
1910	2,062	+15.6%

Year	Pop.	±%
1921	2,012	−2.4%
1930	2,101	+4.4%
1950	1,857	−11.6%
1961	2,157	+16.2%
1970	2,178	+1.0%

Year	Pop.	±%
1980	2,299	+5.6%
1991	2,209	−3.9%
2001	2,186	−1.0%
2011	2,321	+6.2%
2021	2,382	+2.6%

Source: Censuses

== Transport ==
The Brno–Olomouc railway passes through the south of the territory, but there is no stop in the municipality. The nearest train station is in neighbouring Vyškov.

== Sport ==
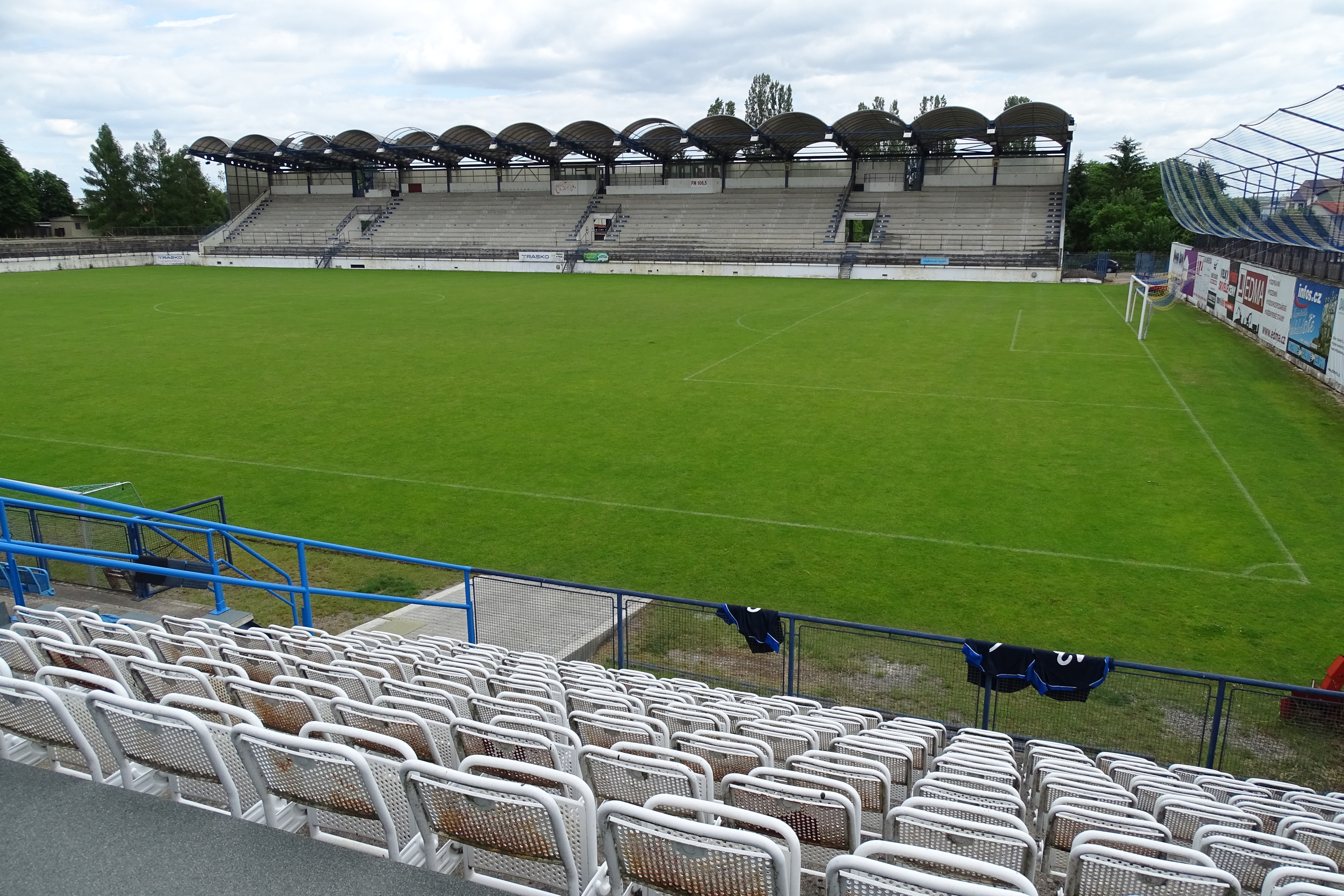
Drnovice football stadium

The municipality was home to football club 1. FK Drnovice, which took part in the Czech First League for ten seasons between 1993 and 2005. Drnovice is the second smallest municipality that has ever been represented in the Czech First League (after Blšany). The club was dissolved in 2006 due to financial trouble. Its successor is a club named FKD, which plays only in amateur competitions.

From 2021, the Czech National Football League matches of MFK Vyškov were played in the football stadium Sportovní areál Drnovice. Its capacity has been reduced to 4,500 seats. However, the leadership of the Drnovice municipality refused to reconstruct the stadium to remain eligible for professional league matches, and the club therefore had to move out of Drnovice in 2025.

== Sights ==
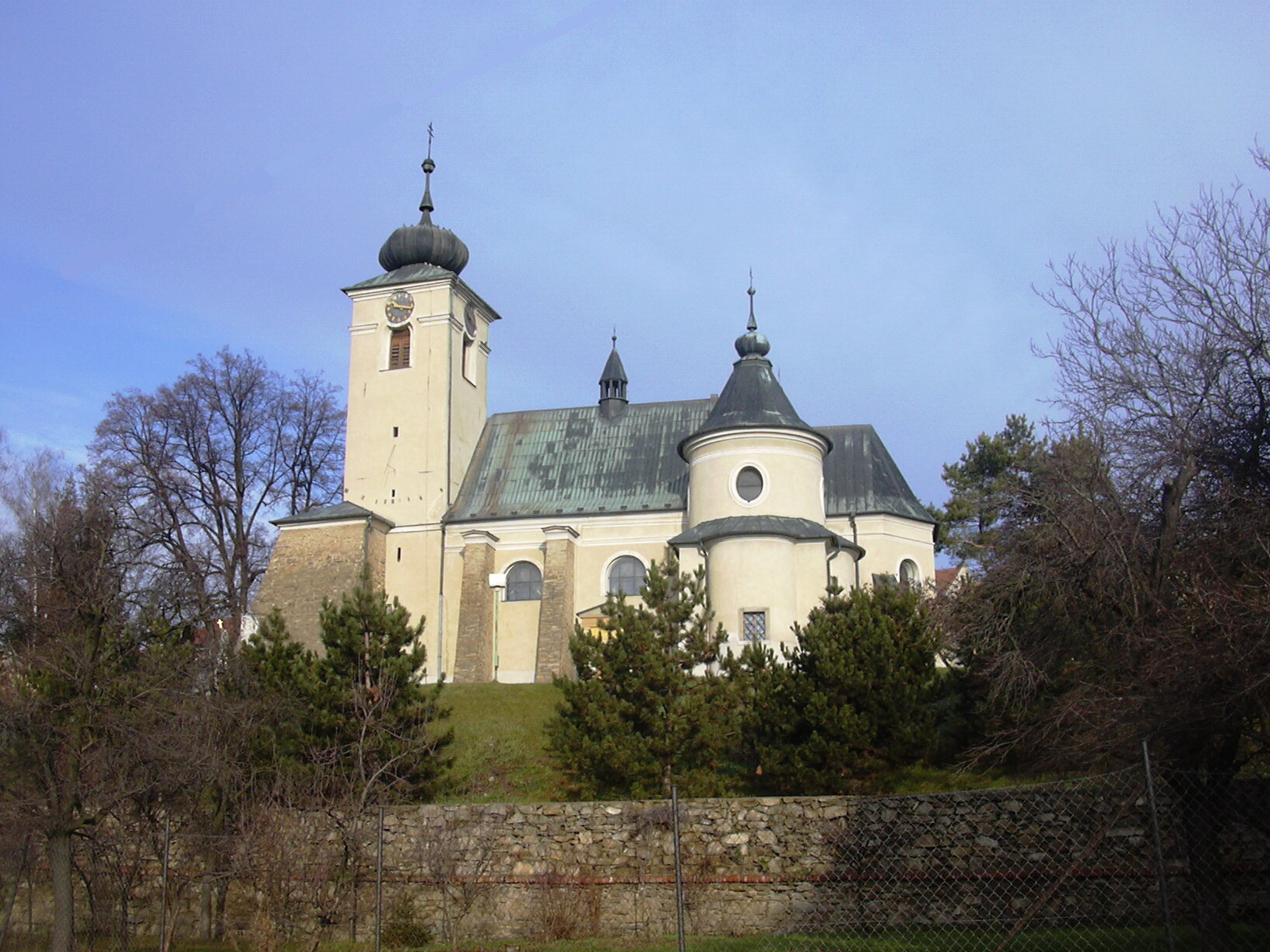
Church of Saint Lawrence

The Church of Saint Lawrence was built in the second half of the 17th century, after the old church was demolished in 1652. Next to the church there are Baroque statues of Saint John of Nepomuk from 1738 and Saint Florian from 1755.

Drnovice Castle was built in 1866–1869. Today it houses the municipal office and a restaurant.

== Notable people ==
- Gisela Januszewska (1867–1943), Austrian medical doctor
- Alexander Roda Roda (1872–1945), Austrian writer
