= AC Sparta Prague B =

- Ground: Great Strahov Stadium
- Capacity: 56,000
- Chairman: Daniel Křetínský
- Manager: Luboš Loučka
- League: Czech National Football League
- 2025–26: 16th of 16 (relegated)

Athletic Club Sparta Praha B, commonly known as Sparta Prague B or Sparta Prague u-21, is the reserve team of Czech First League club AC Sparta Prague and plays in the Bohemian Football League in the third tier of the Czech football league system.

The team played in the Czech second level from 2002 to 2006, and from 2008 to 2012. Between 2014 and 2019 the team did not participate in the league structure, but made a return to the National Football League in 2021 after winning Group A of the Bohemian Football League in the COVID-shortened 2020–21 season. Their tenure in the Second League came to an end in May 2026.

== Players ==
=== Reserve team squad ===
As of 3 November 2026.

Note: Flags indicate national team as defined under FIFA eligibility rules; some limited exceptions apply. Players may hold more than one non-FIFA nationality.

No.	Pos.	Nation	Player
1	GK	CZE	Lukáš Franc
1	GK	CZE	Sebastián Zajac
2	DF	CZE	Maxim Kotíšek
5	DF	CZE	Dennis Krpálek
6	DF	CZE	Jeremy Rebibo
7	MF	CZE	Arsen Vitarigov
8	MF	CZE	Jan Feit
9	FW	BEL	Iverson Negouai
11	DF	CZE	Martin Frýdek
12	DF	CZE	Štěpán Jaroslav Vodolán
14	DF	CZE	Šimon Tesař
15	MF	CZE	Daniel Kaštánek

No.	Pos.	Nation	Player
15	FW	CZE	Ondřej Pavlík
16	MF	CZE	Vincent Kotíšek
17	MF	CZE	Simon Pavlo
18	DF	CZE	Matěj Diviš
19	MF	CZE	Petr Zíka
20	MF	CZE	Lewis Azaka
21	MF	CZE	Jakub Pešek
23	MF	CZE	Chinguun Bolorbold
24	DF	CZE	Jonáš Topič
25	DF	CZE	Vojtěch Novák
26	FW	NGR	Linus Zika
27	DF	CZE	Filip Panák

== History in domestic competitions ==
- 1993–2002 Bohemian Football League
- 2002–06 Czech 2. Liga
- 2006–08 Bohemian Football League
- 2008–12 Czech 2. Liga
- 2012–14 Bohemian Football League
- 2014–19 Did not participate
- 2019–21 Bohemian Football League
- 2021–2026 Czech 2. Liga
- 2026– Bohemian Football League

- Seasons spent at Level 1 of the football league system: 0
- Seasons spent at Level 2 of the football league system: 11
- Seasons spent at Level 3 of the football league system: 15
- Seasons spent at Level 4 of the football league system: 0

=== Czech Republic ===
Season	League	Placed	Pld	W	D	L	GF	GA	GD	Pts
1993–94	3. liga									
1994–95	3. liga									
1995–96	3. liga									
1996–97	3. liga									
1997–98	3. liga									
1998–99	3. liga									
1999–00	3. liga									
2000–01	3. liga									
2001–02	3. liga									
2002–03	2. liga	12th	30	9	8	13	29	38	–9	35
2003–04	2. liga	8th	30	9	11	10	32	24	+8	38
2004–05	2. liga	10th	28	7	11	10	24	30	–6	32
2005–06	2. liga	15th	30	8	10	12	32	37	–5	34
2006–07	3. liga									
2007–08	3. liga									
2008–09	2. liga	11th	30	10	8	12	39	38	+1	38
2009–10	2. liga	12th	30	6	11	13	33	50	–17	29
2010–11	2. liga	12th	30	11	6	13	35	47	–12	39
2011–12	2. liga	16th	30	8	3	19	37	46	–9	27
2012–13	3. liga									
2013–14	3. liga									
2019–20	3. liga									
2020–21	3. liga									
2021–22	2. liga	5th	30	13	7	10	50	37	+13	46
2022–23	2. liga	10th	30	11	6	13	32	39	–7	39
2024–25	2. liga	5th	30	10	10	10	41	39	+2	40
2025–26	2. liga	16th	30	7	4	19	27	54	–27	25
