= 1. SK Prostějov =

Czech association football club

- Full name: 1. SK Prostějov
- Founded: 1904; 122 years ago
- Ground: Stadion Za Místním nádražím
- Capacity: 3,500
- Chairman: Petr Langr
- Manager: Bohuslav Pilný
- League: Czech National Football League
- 2025–26: 14th of 16
- Website: www.1skprostejov.cz
Home colours	Away colours

1. SK Prostějov is a Czech football club from Prostějov, participating in the second-level Czech National Football League. The club is most notable for their participation in the Czechoslovak First League in the 1930s and 1940s, during which time they finished in the top three three times, and also took part in European competition on two occasions.

== History ==
The club was formed in 1904 as Sportovní kroužek Prostějov, before being renamed SK Prostějov in 1907. Prostějov took part in the Czechoslovak First League for the first time in the 1934–35 season, going on to third-placed finishes in the 1935–36 and 1936–37 seasons. They reached the final of the national cup in 1940, losing 5–2 on aggregate to SK Olomouc. In the 1941–42 season, the club achieved its best domestic result, finishing second in the table behind Slavia Prague. In the 1945–46 season the club was relegated from the First League. The club then appeared among the second, third and fourth levels of football in Czechoslovakia and later the Czech Republic.

After the 2002–03 Czech 2. Liga, Prostějov were forcibly relegated, because their stadium did not meet the Football Association criteria. In the 2015–16 season, 1. SK Prostějov won the Moravian-Silesian Football League and were promoted to the second-tier Czech National Football League.

== Historical names ==
- 1904 Sportovní kroužek Prostějov
- 1907 SK Prostějov
- 1948 Sokol Prostějov II
- 1950 Sokol ČSSZ Prostějov
- 1953 Tatran Prostějov
- 1957 Slovan Prostějov
- 1959 TJ Železárny Prostějov
- 1990 SK Prostějov fotbal
- 1995 SK LeRK Prostějov (following merger with FC LeRK Brno)
- 2006 1. SK Prostějov

== Players ==
=== Current squad ===
As of 8 September 2026.

Note: Flags indicate national team as defined under FIFA eligibility rules; some limited exceptions apply. Players may hold more than one non-FIFA nationality.

No.	Pos.	Nation	Player
1	GK	CZE	Daniel Kerl (on loan from Sparta Prague)
2	DF	CZE	Radek Lehovec
4	DF	JPN	Taiyo Ushiyama
5	MF	CZE	Matěj Kolařík (on loan from Sigma Olomouc)
6	MF	CZE	Šimon Jalovičor (on loan from Sigma Olomouc)
8	FW	NGR	Aliyu Imrana
9	MF	CZE	Jakub Matoušek
10	MF	CZE	Marek Kejř
12	MF	CZE	Marek Halda (on loan from Pardubice)
13	DF	CZE	Martin Šindelář
14	MF	CZE	Denis Dziuba
15	FW	CZE	Denis Kramář (on loan from Sigma Olomouc)
16	FW	CZE	Patrik Voleský
17	MF	CZE	Adam Binar (on loan from Hradec Králové)

No.	Pos.	Nation	Player
18	MF	CZE	Marek Jaroň
19	DF	CZE	Dominik Fišer
20	MF	CZE	Marek Polášek
21	DF	CZE	Jan Kadlec
22	MF	CZE	Michal Zapletal
23	DF	CZE	Michal Surzyn (on loan from Pardubice)
26	FW	NGR	Ebuka Okeke (on loan from Hradec Králové)
27	GK	CZE	Petr Mikulec
33	GK	CZE	Martin Vaňák
70	MF	CZE	Jan Koudelka
79	DF	CZE	Šimon Polášek
—	FW	SEN	Amath Cissé
—	MF	CZE	Michal Černák (on loan from Dukla Prague)

== History in domestic competitions ==
- 2011–2012 Czech Fourth Division
- 2012–2016 Moravian–Silesian Football League
- 2016–2017 Czech 2. Liga
- 2017–2018 Moravian–Silesian Football League
- 2018– Czech 2. Liga

- Seasons spent at Level 1 of the football league system: 0
- Seasons spent at Level 2 of the football league system: 8
- Seasons spent at Level 3 of the football league system: 5
- Seasons spent at Level 4 of the football league system: 1

=== Czech Republic ===
Season	League	Placed	Pld	W	D	L	GF	GA	GD	Pts	Cup
2011–12	4. liga	2nd	30	20	6	4	64	26	+38	66	–
2012–13	3. liga	3rd	30	17	6	7	74	50	+24	57	Round of 64
2013–14	3. liga	3rd	30	15	6	9	53	41	+12	51	Round of 64
2014–15	3. liga	3rd	30	14	9	7	57	37	+20	51	Round of 64
2015–16	3. liga	1st	30	19	5	6	66	31	+35	62	Round of 32
2016–17	2. liga	16th	30	3	3	24	20	80	-60	12	Round of 32
2017–18	3. liga	1st	30	22	4	4	79	33	+46	70	Round of 64
2018–19	2. liga	9th	30	9	9	12	28	37	−9	36	First Round
2019–20	2. liga	11th	30	8	11	11	33	42	–9	35	Round of 32
2020–21	2. liga	3rd	26	12	7	7	40	35	+5	43	Round of 32
2021–22	2. liga	11th	30	11	4	15	32	50	–18	37	Round of 32
2022–23	2. liga	12th	30	9	9	12	39	57	–18	36	Round of 32
2023–24	2. liga	12th	30	11	4	15	42	52	–10	37	Round of 32
2024–25	2. liga	12th	30	9	10	11	31	42	–11	37	Round of 64
2025–26	2. liga	12th	30	6	12	12	32	44	–12	30	Round of 64
2026–27	2. liga										Round of 16

== European competitions ==
Prostějov competed in the 1936 and 1937 editions of the Mitropa Cup, reaching the quarter finals in 1936.

== Managers ==
- Emil Rauchmaul (1936)
