= Sportovní areál Drnovice =

Football stadium in Czechia

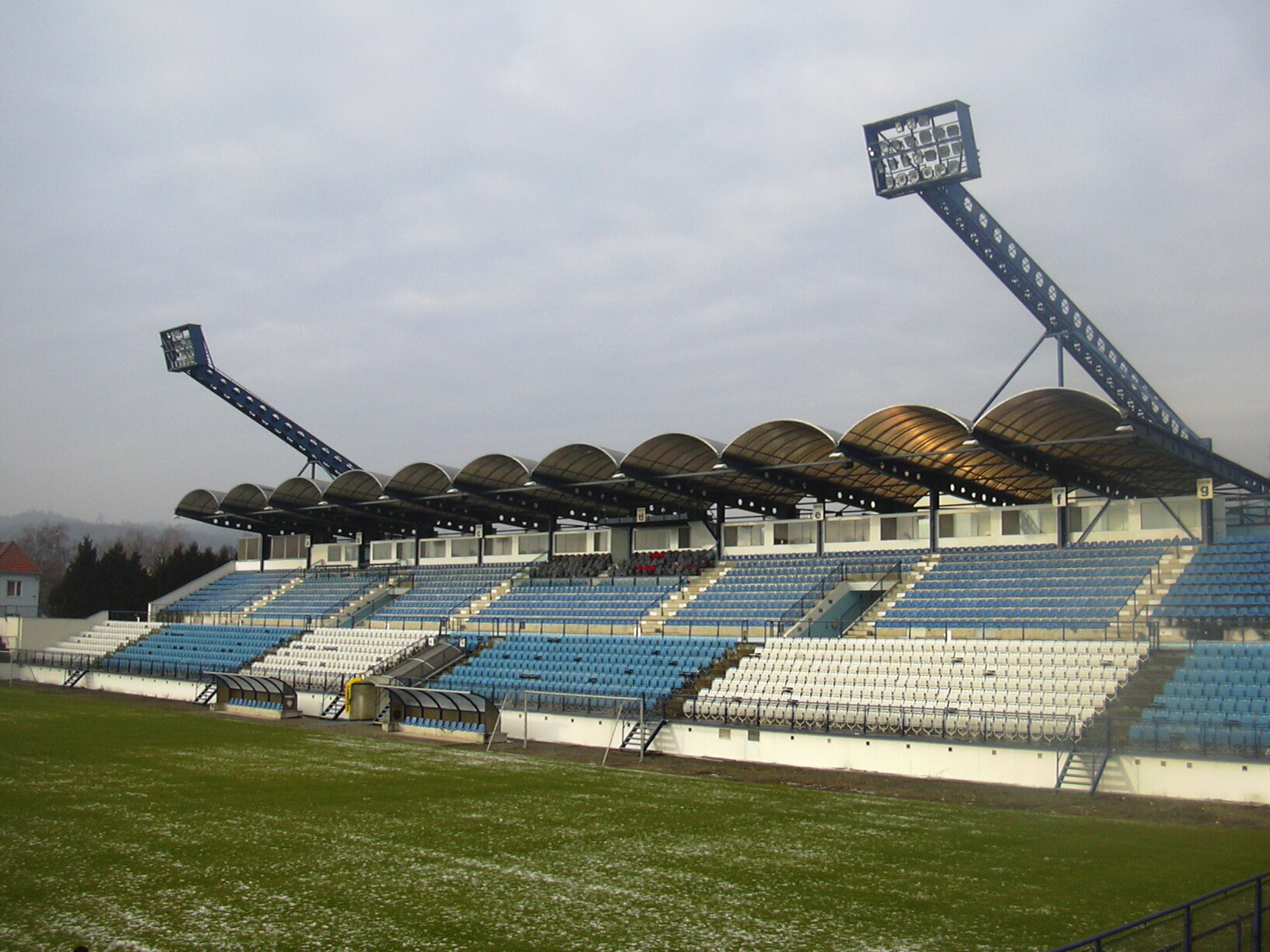
- Grandstand in 2008
- Interactive map of Sportovní areál Drnovice
- Location: Drnovice, Czech Republic
- Coordinates: 49°16′32.16″N 16°57′12.96″E
- Capacity: 4,500
- Field size: 105m x 68m

Construction
- Opened: 1955

Tenants
- FK Drnovice (until 2006); MFK Vyškov (2021–2025)

Sportovní areál Drnovice is a football stadium in Drnovice, in the South Moravian Region of the Czech Republic. The game hosted two friendly matches of the Czech Republic national football team.

== History ==
The stadium opened in 1955. It was used in the Czech First League between 1993 and 2002, and again in the 2004–05 season. It hosted UEFA Cup matches in the 2000–01 season, including against TSV 1860 Munich. The stadium hosted Drnovice's matches in the second tier for the last time in the 2005–06 season. The stadium was sold by auction in March 2016. MFK Vyškov of the second-tier Czech National Football League started using Sportovní areál Drnovice for their league matches from the start of the 2021–22 season. This arrangement continued until the end of the 2024–25 season, by which time, the stadium was non-compliant with key league requirements including under-soil heating and artificial lighting. By 2023, the stadium's capacity had been reduced to 4,500 seats.

== National team matches ==
The stadium was the venue for the 1999 UEFA European Under-16 Championship semi-final between Spain and Germany, in a game contested by players including Mikel Arteta and Pepe Reina. The match, which was played on 4 May 1999, finished 4–0 to Spain. The stadium hosted two matches of the Czech Republic national football team: on 18 August 1999, Drnovice was the venue of the international friendly between the Czech Republic and Switzerland, a game which finished 3–0 to the hosts in front of 7,825 spectators. On 15 August 2001, the stadium hosted a friendly match between the Czech Republic and South Korea. The match, which was a 6,596 sell-out, finished 5–0 to the home side.

18 August 1999

Czech Republic	3–0	Switzerland
Koller 48'; Wolf 57' (o.g.); Baranek 90'

International Friendly
Attendance: 7,825
Referee: Fritz Stuchlik (Austria)

15 August 2001

Czech Republic	5–0	South Korea
Nedvěd 30'; Baranek 66', 86', 90' (pen.); Lokvenc 74'

International Friendly
Attendance: 6,596
Referee: Ladislav Gádoši (Slovakia)
