= Stadion Kollárova ulice =

Multi-use stadium in Vlašim, Czech Republic

- Interactive map of Stadion Kollárova ulice
- Location: Kollárova, Vlašim, Czech Republic, 258 01
- Coordinates: 49°42′9.37″N 14°53′29.40″E
- Operator: FC Sellier & Bellot Vlašim
- Capacity: 1,500
- Surface: Grass
- Field size: 105m x 68m

Construction
- Opened: 1927
- Renovated: 2009

Tenant
- FC Sellier & Bellot Vlašim

Stadion Kollárova ulice is a multi-use stadium in Vlašim, Czech Republic. It is currently used mostly for football matches and is the home ground of FC Sellier & Bellot Vlašim. It has a capacity of 3,000, out of which 1,500 is seating capacity.
