= Městský stadion v Kotlině =

Football stadium in the Czech Republic

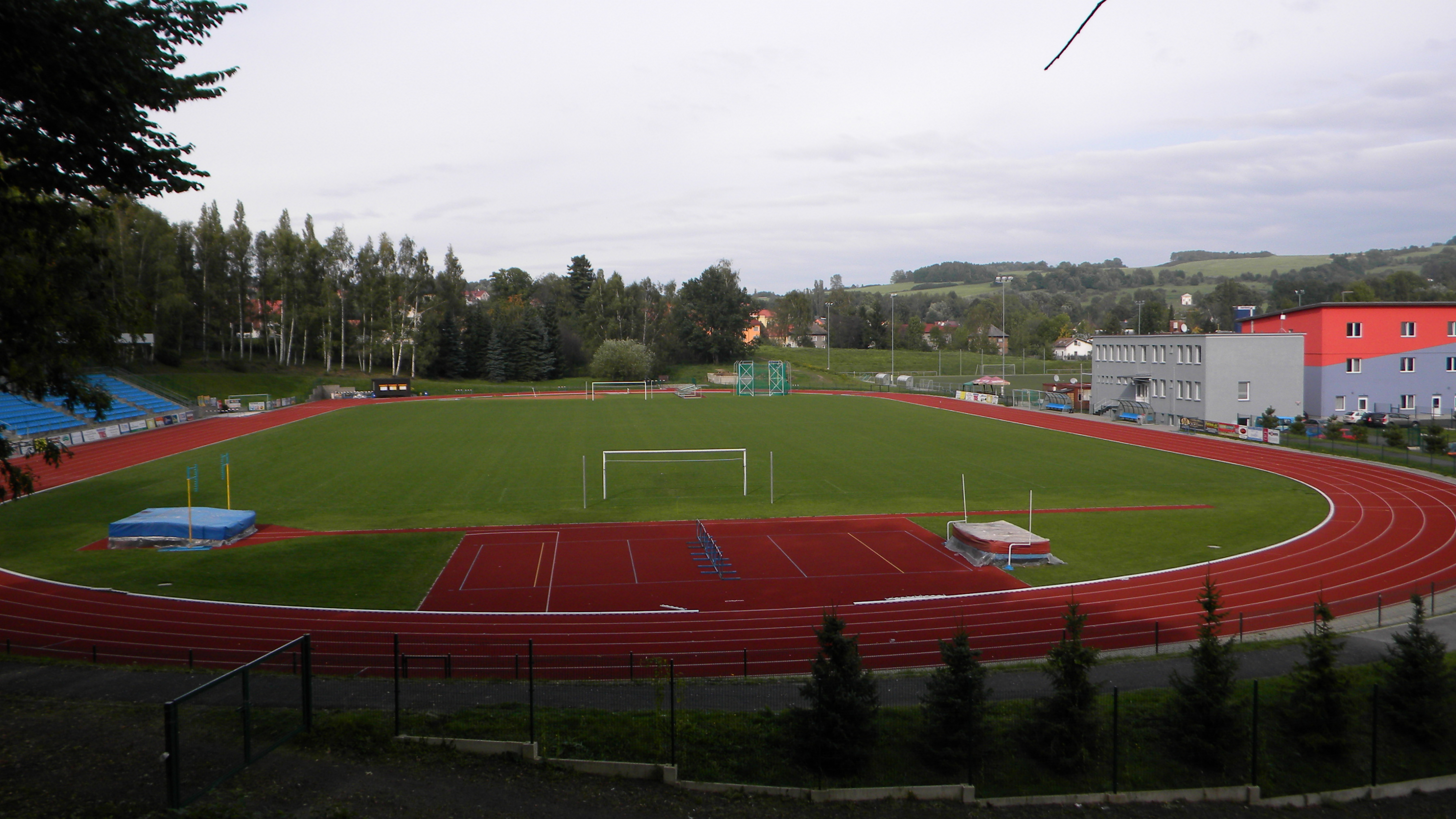
- Interactive map of Městský stadion v Kotlině
- Location: Moravská 2688; Varnsdorf; Czech Republic, 407 47
- Coordinates: 50°54′54″N 14°37′08″E
- Capacity: 5,000 (900 Seated)

Tenant
- FK Varnsdorf

Městský stadion v Kotlině is a football stadium in Varnsdorf, Czech Republic. It is the home stadium of FK Varnsdorf. The stadium holds 5,000 spectators, of which 900 can be seated.
