= FK Varnsdorf =

- Full name: Fotbalový klub Varnsdorf a.s.
- Founded: 1938; 88 years ago
- Ground: Městský stadion v Kotlině; Varnsdorf
- Capacity: 5,000 (900 seated)
- Chairman: Vlastimil Gabriel
- Manager: Pavlo Rudnytskyi
- League: Bohemian Football League Gr. B
- 2025–26: 11th of 16
- Website: fkvarnsdorf.cz
Home colours	Away colours

FK Varnsdorf is a Czech football club located in Varnsdorf, Czech Republic. In 2011 the club changed its name from SK Slovan Varnsdorf to FK Varnsdorf. It currently plays in the Bohemian Football League.

== History ==
The team's biggest success in recent history was finishing 2nd in the 2014–15 Czech National Football League and earning promotion to the Czech First League for the first time in club history. However, they forfeited the promotion due to their stadium Městský stadion v Kotlině failing to meet league requirements. From 2010 to 2025, Varnsdorf competed in the second-tier Czech National Football League before being relegated at the end of the 2024–25 season.

== Historical names ==
- 1938 SK Hraničáři Varnsdorf
- 194? Sokol Elite Varnsdorf
- 1953 DSO Jiskra Varnsdorf (after merger with Sokol Velveta Varnsdorf)
- 1957 TJ Slovan Varnsdorf (after merger with TJ Spartak Varnsdorf)
- 1996 SK Slovan Varnsdorf
- 2011 FK Varnsdorf
