= MFK Chrudim =

- Full name: Městský fotbalový klub Chrudim
- Founded: 1923; 103 years ago
- Ground: Za Vodojemem
- Capacity: 1,500
- Chairman: Tomáš Linhart
- Manager: Jan Zvolánek
- League: Czech National Football League
- 2025–26: 11th of 16
- Website: https://www.mfkchrudim.cz/
Home colours	Away colours

MFK Chrudim is a Czech football club located in Chrudim. It plays in the Bohemian Football League, which is in the third tier of the Czech Republic football league system.

== History ==
The club played in the fourth level of football in 1994–1998, in the third level in 1998–2004 and again in fourth level in 2004–2011. In January 2011, a merger took place between AFK Chrudim, a club founded in 1899, and SK Chrudim. This new club became known as Městský fotbalový klub (MFK) Chrudim. In June 2011, Chrudim were promoted to the third-tier Bohemian Football League, despite only finishing second in the Czech Fourth Division's Divize C, due to an extra place becoming available following the withdrawal of České Budějovice B from the division above. It was also confirmed that from the start of the 2011–12 season, the club would be known as MFK Chrudim.

Chrudim won the Bohemian Football League in 2012, however due to the condition of their stadium, second placed FK Pardubice was promoted in their place, and Chrudim remained in the third-level league. Chrudim developed their stadium, installing a grandstand in 2015 and making it suitable for a higher level of competition. After becoming champions of the Bohemian Football League again, in 2018, Chrudim was finally allowed to participate in the Czech National Football League. After finishing 13th in their first season, 2018–19, the club achieved 10th position in 2019–20 and 2020–21.

After the 2025–26 season, the club was administratively relegated to the Bohemian Football League, after it failed to meet the conditions for obtaining a license for professional competition.

== Honours ==
- Bohemian Football League (third tier)
  - Champions (2): 2011–12, 2017–18
