= MFK Vyškov =

- Full name: Městský fotbalový klub Vyškov
- Founded: 1921; 104 years ago (as SK Vyškov)
- Ground: Za Parkem
- Capacity: 3,000
- Chairman: Jaroslav Schindler
- League: Czech National Football League
- 2024–25: 3rd of 16 (withdrawn from the competition after the season)
- Website: mfkvyskov.cz
Home colours	Away colours	Third colours

MFK Vyškov is a Czech football club located in the town of Vyškov in the South Moravian Region. From 2021 to 2025, it played in the Czech National Football League, the second level of Czech football. Because the club does not have a stadium that would allow it to play professional league matches, it has decided to play only in lower amateur tiers from 2025.

== History ==
The club changed names on 1 January 2012, changing from SK Rostex Vyškov to MFK Vyškov. In 2020, the club was owned by Rainbow World Group, also owners of Cameroonian side Rainbow FC.

In the 2020–21 season of the MSFL, which was unfinished because of the COVID-19 pandemic measures, Vyškov finished first in the incomplete table and was offered participation in the Czech National Football League, which the club accepted.

On 15 January 2024, the club announced their new owner American investment group Blue Crow Sports Group who also own Spanish LaLiga club CD Leganés.

== Historical names ==
- 1931–1938: SK Vyškov
- 1939–1949: HSK (Hanácký sportovní klub)
- 1949–1953: Sokol Vyškov
- 1953–1966: Slavoj Vyškov
- 1966–1993: TJ Vyškov
- 1993–2011: SK Rostex Vyškov
- 2012–: MFK Vyškov

== Czech Cup ==
Vyškov has taken part in the Czech Cup a number of times, reaching the third round in the 2006–07 edition.
