= 2024–25 FC Zbrojovka Brno season =

FC Zbrojovka Brno
2024–25 season
- General manager: Jan Mynář
- Manager: Jaroslav Hynek (until 16 March 2025); Marek Zúbek (interim); Martin Svědík (from 11 April 2025)
- Stadium: Městský fotbalový stadion Srbská
- Fortuna národní liga: 14th
- Czech Cup: Third round
- Top goalscorer: League: Adam Kronus (8); All: Adam Kronus (8); Roman Potočný (8)
- Highest home attendance: 3,092, 21 September 2024 v Líšeň (league)
- Lowest home attendance: 770, 25 October 2024 v Slavia Prague "B" (league)
- Average home league attendance: 1,840
- Biggest win: 6–2, 29 August 2024 v Bohunice (cup)
- Biggest defeat: 1–6, 3 August 2024 v Varnsdorf (league)
Home colours	Away colours

The 2024–24 FC Zbrojovka Brno season is the club's 6th season in the Fortuna národní liga. The team is competing in Fortuna národní liga and the Czech Cup.

== First team squad ==
As of 12 March 2025.

Note: Flags indicate national team as defined under FIFA eligibility rules; some limited exceptions apply. Players may hold more than one non-FIFA nationality.

No.	Pos.	Nation	Player
1	GK	(Czech Republic) CZE	Michal Hložánek
3	DF	(Ghana) GHA	Foster Gyamfi
6	MF	(Czech Republic) CZE	Daniel Polák
7	MF	(Czech Republic) CZE	Ondřej Pachlopník
8	DF	(Czech Republic) CZE	Zdeněk Toman
9	FW	(Czech Republic) CZE	Daniel Švancara
11	FW	(Colombia) COL	William Mackleyther
13	MF	(Czech Republic) CZE	Jiří Texl
14	FW	(Czech Republic) CZE	Tadeáš Vachoušek (on loan from Teplice)
16	FW	(Czech Republic) CZE	Adam Kronus
17	DF	(Czech Republic) CZE	Daniel Kutík
18	DF	(Czech Republic) CZE	Denis Granečný
19	MF	(Czech Republic) CZE	David Polášek
20	MF	(Czech Republic) CZE	Lukas Saal
21	FW	(Czech Republic) CZE	Filip Večeřa

No.	Pos.	Nation	Player
23	DF	(Czech Republic) CZE	Jakub Šural
24	GK	(Czech Republic) CZE	Dominik Sváček
25	DF	(Czech Republic) CZE	Tomáš Břečka
26	DF	(Czech Republic) CZE	Martin Nový
28	DF	(Czech Republic) CZE	Patrik Haitl
29	MF	(Czech Republic) CZE	Patrik Žitný
31	MF	(Czech Republic) CZE	David Jambor
32	MF	(Czech Republic) CZE	Jan Hellebrand
35	GK	(Slovakia) SVK	Adam Hrdina
44	DF	(Czech Republic) CZE	Filip Štěpánek
66	DF	(Czech Republic) CZE	Stanislav Hofmann
68	MF	(Czech Republic) CZE	Jakub Janetzký
77	DF	(Czech Republic) CZE	Lucas Kubr
79	GK	(Czech Republic) CZE	Kryštof Lichtenberg (on loan from Mladá Boleslav)
99	FW	(Trinidad and Tobago) TRI	Justin Araujo-Wilson

=== Out on loan ===
Note: Flags indicate national team as defined under FIFA eligibility rules; some limited exceptions apply. Players may hold more than one non-FIFA nationality.

No.	Pos.	Nation	Player

== Competitions ==
Win Draw Loss

=== Overview ===
Competition	First match	Last match	Starting round	Record							
Competition	First match	Last match	Starting round	Pld	W	D	L	GF	GA	GD	Win %
Fortuna národní liga	22 July 2024	24 May 2025	Matchday 1	27	8	10	9	36	39	−3	29.63
MOL Cup	29 August 2024	30 October 2024	First round	3	2	0	1	9	7	+2	66.67
Total				30	10	10	10	45	46	−1	33.33

Last updated: 8 May 2025
Source: Competitions

=== Fortuna národní liga ===
==== Results summary ====
Overall								Home						Away					
Pld	W	D	L	GF	GA	GD	Pts	W	D	L	GF	GA	GD	W	D	L	GF	GA	GD
27	8	10	9	36	39	−3	34	2	7	4	15	20	−5	6	3	5	21	19	+2

Last updated: 8 May 2025.

==== Results by round ====
Round	1	2	3	4	5	6	7	8	9	10	11	12	13	14	15	16	17	18	19	20	21	22	23	24	25	26	27	28	29	30
Ground	A	A	A	H	A	H	A	H	H	A	A	H	A	H	A	H	H	A	H	A	H	A	H	A	H	A	H	A	H	H
Result	W	D	L	L	W	D	L	L	D	L	L	D	L	D	W	D	D	W	L	D	L	D	D	W	W	W	W			
Position	3	4	7	13	7	8	12	12	14	14	15	14	16	15	14	14	14	13	15	15	16	16	14	14	14	11	9			

Updated to match(es) played on 8 May 2025. Source:
A = Away; H = Home; W = Win; D = Draw; L = Loss

==== League table ====
Pos	Team	Pld	W	D	L	GF	GA	GD	Pts
5	Sparta Prague B	30	10	10	10	41	39	+2	40 (Note: Head to head points: Sparta Prague B 6, Vlašim 0.)
6	Vlašim	30	9	13	8	43	39	+4	40
7	Zbrojovka Brno	30	9	12	9	39	41	−2	39 (Note: Head to head points: Zbrojovka Brno 7, Líšeň 5, Viktoria Žižkov 4.)
8	Líšeň	30	9	12	9	31	35	−4	39
9	Viktoria Žižkov	30	11	6	13	51	49	+2	39

Source: Chance Národní Liga
Rules for classification: 1) Points; 2) Head-to-head points; 3) Head-to-head goal difference; 4) Head-to-head goals scored; 5) Goal difference; 6) Goals scored; 7) Play-off (if deciding promotion or relegation); 8) Draw

==== Results ====
22 July 2024 1	Jihlava	0–2	Zbrojovka Brno	Jihlava
17:30 CEST (UTC+2)	Lacko (yellow card) 42'; Štětka (red card) 78'; Lampíř (yellow card) 86' (assistant); Filip Novák (red card) 86' (team manager); Chytrý (yellow card) 90+3'	Report	Janetzký 4'; Pernica (yellow card) 30'; Kronus (yellow card) 38'; Potočný (yellow card) 80'; Potočný 84'	Stadium: Stadion v Jiráskově ulici Attendance: 1,230; Referee: Jan Petřík

26 July 2024 2	Opava	1–1	Zbrojovka Brno	Opava
18:00 CEST (UTC+2)	Helešic (yellow card) 7'; Omale (yellow card) 9'; Omale 43'; Kozák (yellow card) 45'; Vincour (yellow card) 52'	Report		Stadium: Stadion v Městských sadech Attendance: 1,493; Referee: Pavel Orel

31 July 2024 3	Chrudim	1–0	Zbrojovka Brno	Chrudim
18:00 CEST (UTC+2)	Řezníček 45'; Šerák (yellow card) 71'; Tichai (yellow card) 87' (coach); Skwarczek (yellow card) 90+5'	Report	Potočný (yellow card) 14'; Nový (yellow card) 90+4'	Stadium: Stadion Za Vodojemem; Attendance: 1,630; Referee: Adam Trska

3 August 2024 4	Zbrojovka Brno	1–6	Varnsdorf	Brno
18:00 CEST (UTC+2)		Report		Stadium: Městský fotbalový stadion Srbská; Attendance: 2,118; Referee: Petr Dorušák

10 August 2024 5	Táborsko	0–1	Zbrojovka Brno	Tábor
15:00 CEST (UTC+2)		Report		Stadium: Stadion v Kvapilově ulici Attendance: 890; Referee: Vít Zaoral

18 August 2024 6	Zbrojovka Brno	0–0	Sparta Prague "B"	Brno
18:00 CEST (UTC+2)		Report		Stadium: Městský fotbalový stadion Srbská; Attendance: 1,512; Referee: Petr Hocek

26 August 2024 7	Vyškov	1–0	Zbrojovka Brno	Drnovice
17:30 CEST (UTC+2)		Report		Stadium: Sportovní areál Drnovice; Attendance: 2,361; Referee: Jan Petřík

1 September 2024 8	Zbrojovka Brno	1–2	Zlín	Brno
18:00 CEST (UTC+2)		Report		Stadium: Městský fotbalový stadion Srbská; Attendance: 1,814; Referee: Michael Kvítek

21 September 2024 9	Zbrojovka Brno	1–1	Líšeň	Brno
17:00 CEST (UTC+2)		Report		Stadium: Městský fotbalový stadion Srbská; Attendance: 3,092; Referee: Adam Trska

29 September 2024 10	Sigma Olomouc "B"	4–1	Zbrojovka Brno	Olomouc
10:15 CEST (UTC+2)		Report		Stadium: Andrův stadion Attendance: 440; Referee: Daniel Lovětínský

2 October 2024 11	Prostějov	3–1	Zbrojovka Brno	Prostějov
18:00 CEST (UTC+2)		Report		Stadium: Stadion Za Místním nádražím Attendance: 470; Referee: Petr Hocek

5 October 2024 12	Zbrojovka Brno	2–2	Vlašim	Brno
17:00 CEST (UTC+2)		Report		Stadium: Městský fotbalový stadion Srbská; Attendance: 1,312; Referee: Vojtěch Opočenský

20 October 2024 13	Viktoria Žižkov	4–2	Zbrojovka Brno	Prague
10:15 CEST (UTC+2)	Necid 20', 30'; Sodoma (yellow card) 37'; Štěpánek 73' (o.g.); Gembický 85'	Report	Potočný 17', 43'; Potočný (yellow card) 45'; Texl (yellow card) 90+3'	Stadium: FK Viktoria Stadion; Attendance: 2,088; Referee: Pavel Orel

25 October 2024 14	Zbrojovka Brno	1–1	Slavia Prague "B"	Brno
18:00 CEST (UTC+2)	Kubr 38'; Štěpánek (yellow card) 56'; Smejkal (yellow card) 86'	Report	Beran 23'; Toula (yellow card) 66'; Pikolon (yellow card) 90+3'	Stadium: Městský fotbalový stadion Srbská; Attendance: 770; Referee: Jan Machálek

3 November 2024 15	Baník Ostrava "B"	1–2	Zbrojovka Brno	Ostrava
10:15 CEST (UTC+2)	Kašpárek 61'; Jaroň (yellow card) 26'; Munksgaard (yellow card) 52'; Komljenovic (yellow card) 64'; Dvorník (yellow card) 79' (coach)	Report	Potočný 46', 79'; Potočný (yellow card) 64'; Sváček (yellow card) 90+5'	Stadium: Městský stadion Attendance: 404; Referee: Vojtěch Opočenský

9 November 2024 16	Zbrojovka Brno	2–2	Opava	Brno
15:00 CEST (UTC+2)	Hamza (yellow card) 22'; Potočný 69'; Janetzký 74'; Šural (yellow card) 84'; Sváček (yellow card) 90+2'	Report	Haitl 12'; Ondráček (yellow card) 48'; Papalélé 58'; Rataj (yellow card) 68'	Stadium: Městský fotbalový stadion Srbská; Attendance: 1,101; Referee: Daniel Vokoun

1 March 2025 17	Zbrojovka Brno	0–0	Chrudim	Brno
15:00 CEST (UTC+2)	Texl (yellow card) 33'	Report	Bauer (yellow card) 86'	Stadium: Městský fotbalový stadion Srbská; Attendance: 3,012; Referee: Ondřej Pechanec

9 March 2025 18	Varnsdorf	0–3	Zbrojovka Brno	Varnsdorf
14:30 CEST (UTC+2)		Report	Mackleyther 30'; Endl (yellow card) 83'; Hofmann (yellow card) 35'; Vachoušek (yellow card) 39'; Kronus 76'	Stadium: Městský stadion v Kotlině; Attendance: 1,100; Referee: Simon Vejtasa

15 March 2025 19	Zbrojovka Brno	0–2	Táborsko	Brno
15:00 CEST (UTC+2)	Nový (yellow card) 87'; Pachlopník (yellow card) 89'	Report	Varačka 14'; Dordič 59'; Kateřiňák (yellow card) 85'	Stadium: Městský fotbalový stadion Srbská; Attendance: 1,957; Referee: Vojtěch Opočenský

30 March 2025 20	Sparta Prague "B"	1–1	Zbrojovka Brno	Prague
10:30 CEST (UTC+2)	Michl 14'; Jedlička (yellow card) 33'	Report	Večeřa (yellow card) 15'; Janetzký 21'; Janetzký (yellow card) 36' (yellow-red card) 49'	Stadium: FK Viktoria Stadion; Attendance: 942; Referee: Jan Beneš

5 April 2025 21	Zbrojovka Brno	1–2	Vyškov	Brno
14:00 CEST (UTC+2)	Pachlopník (yellow card) 22'; Mackleyther (yellow card) 39'; Kronus 53'	Report	Fomba (yellow card) 36'; Zifčák 47'; Ulbrich 55'; Němeček (yellow card) 72'	Stadium: Městský fotbalový stadion Srbská; Attendance: 1,511; Referee: Ondřej Pechanec

11 April 2025 22	Zlín	1–1	Zbrojovka Brno	Zlín
15:00 CEST (UTC+2)	Poznar 33'	Report	Kutík (yellow card) 46'; Nový 51'	Stadium: Letná Stadion; Attendance: 2,722; Referee: Jan Beneš

16 April 2025 23	Zbrojovka Brno	1–1	Prostějov	Brno
18:00 CEST (UTC+2)	Kronus 8'	Report	Hofmann 61' (o.g.)	Stadium: Městský fotbalový stadion Srbská; Attendance: 1,834; Referee: Karel Rouček

19 April 2025 24	Líšeň	1–4	Zbrojovka Brno	Brno
12:30 CEST (UTC+2)	Sedlák (yellow card) 9'; Silný 49' (pen.); Málek (yellow card) 59'; Pernica (yellow card) 64'; Silný (yellow card) 72'; Klein (yellow card) 73' (masseur)	Report	Žitný 3', 15'; Granečný 10'; Texl 39'; Vachoušek (yellow card) 65'; Břečka (yellow card) 77'; Šural (yellow card) 86'	Stadium: Stadion SK Líšeň; Attendance: 2,014; Referee: Ondřej Pechanec

26 April 2025 25	Zbrojovka Brno	1–0	Sigma Olomouc "B"	Brno
17:00 CEST (UTC+2)	Kutík 48'	Report	Jalovičor (yellow card) 45+1'	Stadium: Městský fotbalový stadion Srbská; Attendance: 2,047; Referee: Stanislav Volek

2 May 2025 26	Vlašim	1–2	Zbrojovka Brno	Vlašim
18:00 CEST (UTC+2)	Kolářík 28'; Onije (yellow card) 39' (yellow-red card) 49'	Report	Granečný 23'; Nový 45+1'; Vachoušek 50'; Hofmann (yellow card) 86'	Stadium: Stadion Kollárova ulice Attendance: 590; Referee: Vít Zaoral

7 May 2025 27	Zbrojovka Brno	4–1	Viktoria Žižkov	Brno
17:00 CEST (UTC+2)	Žitný 15', 34'; Janetzký 39'; Granečný 90'	Report	Toula 36'; Vaníček (yellow card) 54'; Muleme (yellow card) 65'	Stadium: Městský fotbalový stadion Srbská; Attendance: 1,908; Referee: Daniel Vokoun

11 May 2025 28	Slavia Prague "B"	v	Zbrojovka Brno	Prague
10:15 CEST (UTC+2)				Stadium: Fotbalový stadion Radotín

17 May 2025 29	Zbrojovka Brno	v	Baník Ostrava "B"	Brno
15:00 CEST (UTC+2)				Stadium: Městský fotbalový stadion Srbská

25 May 2025 30	Zbrojovka Brno	v	Jihlava	Brno
17:00 CEST (UTC+2)				Stadium: Městský fotbalový stadion Srbská

=== Czech Cup ===
==== Results ====
28 August 2024 First round	Bohunice (4)	2–6	Zbrojovka Brno	Brno-Bohunice
17:00 CEST (UTC+2)		Report		Stadium: Stadion Tatran Bohunice; Attendance: 1,328; Referee: Ondřej Cieslar

25 September 2024 Second round	Frenštát pod Radhoštěm (4)	1–3	Zbrojovka Brno	Frenštát pod Radhoštěm
16:30 CEST (UTC+2)		Report		Stadium: Stadion SK Beskyd Frenštát pod Radhoštěm; Attendance: 494; Referee: Stanislav Volek

30 October 2024 Third round	Sparta Prague	4–0	Zbrojovka Brno	Prague
19:15 CEST (UTC+2)	Krasniqi 40'; Pešek 65'; Daněk 71'; Rrahmani 80' (pen.)	Report		Stadium: epet ARENA; Attendance: 13,649; Referee: Pavel Orel

== Squad statistics ==
=== Appearances and goals ===
No.	Pos	Nat	Player	Total		Fortuna národní liga		MOL Cup	
No.	Pos	Nat	Player	Apps	Goals	Apps	Goals	Apps	Goals
Goalkeepers
24	GK	(Czech Republic) CZE	Dominik Sváček	8	0	7	0	1	0
35	GK	(Slovakia) SVK	Adam Hrdina	10	0	10	0	0	0
79	GK	(Czech Republic) CZE	Kryštof Lichtenberg	0	0	0	0	0	0
Defenders
8	DF	(Czech Republic) CZE	Zdeněk Toman	5	0	1+2	0	2	0
17	DF	(Czech Republic) CZE	Daniel Kutík	9	1	6+3	1	0	0
18	DF	(Czech Republic) CZE	Denis Granečný	18	0	14+2	0	1+1	0
23	DF	(Czech Republic) CZE	Jakub Šural	10	0	4+4	0	2	0
25	DF	(Czech Republic) CZE	Tomáš Břečka	19	1	13+3	1	3	0
26	DF	(Czech Republic) CZE	Martin Nový	10	0	8+1	0	1	0
28	DF	(Czech Republic) CZE	Patrik Haitl	10	0	8+1	0	1	0
33	DF	(Czech Republic) CZE	Ondřej Šlapanský	3	0	0+1	0	2	0
44	DF	(Czech Republic) CZE	Filip Štěpánek	14	0	13+1	0	0	0
66	DF	(Czech Republic) CZE	Stanislav Hofmann	19	1	13+3	1	3	0
77	DF	(Czech Republic) CZE	Lucas Kubr	19	1	13+3	1	3	0
Midfielders
6	MF	(Czech Republic) CZE	Daniel Polák	13	0	7+3	0	3	0
7	MF	(Czech Republic) CZE	Ondřej Pachlopník	0	0	0	0	0	0
13	MF	(Czech Republic) CZE	Jiří Texl	14	0	9+3	0	1+1	0
19	MF	(Czech Republic) CZE	David Polášek	9	0	2+6	0	0+1	0
20	MF	(Czech Republic) CZE	Lukas Saal	9	0	2+6	0	0+1	0
29	MF	(Czech Republic) CZE	Patrik Žitný	14	0	9+3	0	1+1	0
31	MF	(Czech Republic) CZE	David Jambor	6	0	2+4	0	0	0
32	MF	(Czech Republic) CZE	Jan Hellebrand	0	0	0	0	0	0
38	MF	(Slovakia) SVK	Peter Štepanovský	2	1	0+2	1	0	0
68	MF	(Czech Republic) CZE	Jakub Janetzký	17	2	15	2	1+1	0
	MF	(Czech Republic) CZE	Oldřich Pragr	1	0	0	0	0+1	0
Forwards
9	FW	(Czech Republic) CZE	Daniel Švancara	11	1	5+4	0	1+1	1
11	MF	(Colombia) COL	William Mackleyther	0	0	0	0	0	0
14	MF	(Czech Republic) CZE	Tadeáš Vachoušek	0	0	0	0	0	0
16	MF	(Czech Republic) CZE	Adam Kronus	18	5	13+2	5	0+3	0
21	FW	(Czech Republic) CZE	Filip Večeřa	5	0	1+3	0	1	0
99	MF	(Trinidad and Tobago) TRI	Justin Araujo-Wilson	0	0	0	0	0	0
Players transferred/loaned out during the season
27	GK	(Czech Republic) CZE	Filip Mucha	11	0	9	0	2	0
4	DF	(Czech Republic) CZE	Luděk Pernica	13	2	7+4	0	1+1	2
5	DF	(Czech Republic) CZE	Jiří Hamza	18	1	14+1	0	2+1	1
2	DF	(Slovakia) SVK	Šimon Mičuda	12	1	2+7	0	1+2	1
3	DF	(Ghana) GHA	Foster Gyamfi	4	0	2+2	0	0	0
	MF	(Nigeria) NGA	Wale Musa Alli	4	0	1+3	0	0	0
29	MF	(Czech Republic) CZE	Tomáš Smejkal	16	1	8+5	1	2+1	0
	FW	(Czech Republic) CZE	Jakub Řezníček	2	1	0+2	1	0	0
17	FW	(Croatia) CRO	Carlo Mateković	11	0	4+5	0	2	0
10	MF	(Czech Republic) CZE	Roman Potočný	18	11	15	7	3	4

Last updated: 18 November 2024
Source: Competitions

=== Goal Scorers ===
Place	Pos.	Name	Fortuna národní liga	MOL Cup	Total
1	FW	(Czech Republic) Jakub Řezníček	12	0	12
2	FW	(Czech Republic) Denis Alijagić	3	1	4
3	MF	(Czech Republic) Roman Potočný	2	1	3
4	MF	(Czech Republic) Adam Kronus	1	1	2
5	MF	(Czech Republic) Jiří Texl	1	0	1
5	MF	(Czech Republic) Tomáš Smejkal	1	0	1
5	DF	(Czech Republic) Jan Štěrba	1	0	1
5	DF	(Czech Republic) Jakub Šural	1	0	1
5	DF	(Czech Republic) Josef Koželuh	0	1	1
5	MF	(Czech Republic) Pavel Gaszczyk	0	1	1
5	DF	(Czech Republic) Denis Granečný	0	1	1
5	MF	(Czech Republic) Adam Fousek	0	1	1
5	DF	(Czech Republic) Josef Divíšek	0	1	1
5	MF	(Nigeria) Wale Musa Alli	0	1	1
5	FW	(Czech Republic) Jan Hladík	0	1	1
Own goals			0	0	0
TOTAL			22	10	32

Last updated: 5 November 2023
Source: Competitions

=== Assists ===
Place	Pos.	Name	Fortuna národní liga	MOL Cup	Total
1	MF	(Czech Republic) Adam Fousek	3	0	3
1	MF	(Czech Republic) Roman Potočný	2	1	3
1	MF	(Czech Republic) Tomáš Smejkal	2	1	3
1	DF	(Czech Republic) Jan Hladík	2	1	3
2	FW	(Czech Republic) Jakub Řezníček	2	0	2
2	DF	(Czech Republic) Lukáš Endl	2	0	2
2	MF	(Czech Republic) Adam Kronus	1	1	2
2	MF	(Nigeria) Wale Musa Alli	0	2	2
3	DF	(Czech Republic) Martin Nový	1	0	1
3	MF	(Czech Republic) Pavel Gaszczyk	1	0	1
3	MF	(Guinea) Kamso Mara	1	0	1
3	DF	(Czech Republic) Josef Koželuh	1	0	1
3	MF	(Czech Republic) Jiří Texl	0	1	1
3	MF	(Slovakia) Nicolas Martinek	0	1	1
TOTAL			19	9	28

Last updated: 5 November 2023
Source: Competitions

=== Clean sheets ===
Place	Pos.	Name	Fortuna národní liga	MOL Cup	Total
1	GK	(Czech Republic) Martin Berkovec	5	0	5
2	GK	(Czech Republic) Jakub Šiman	0	1	1
3	GK	(Czech Republic) Michal Hložánek	0	0	0
TOTAL			5	1	6

Last updated: 5 November 2023
Source: Competitions

=== Disciplinary record ===
Position	Name	Fortuna národní liga		MOL Cup		Total	
Position	Name	Booked	Sent off (straight red)	Booked	Sent off (straight red)	Booked	Sent off (straight red)
FW	(Czech Republic) Jakub Řezníček	2	0	0	0	2	0
MF	(Czech Republic) Roman Potočný	2	0	0	0	2	0
MF	(Czech Republic) Jiří Hamza	1	0	0	0	1	0
MF	(Czech Republic) Denis Granečný	1	0	0	0	1	0
MF	(Czech Republic) David Jambor	1	0	0	0	1	0
Players away on loan:
Players who left Zbrojovka during the season:
	TOTALS	7	0	0	0	7	0

Last updated: 10 August 2023
Source: Competitions
