= 2020–21 FK Jablonec season =

FK Jablonec
2020–21 season
- Chairman: Petr Flodrman
- Manager: Petr Rada
- Stadium: Stadion Střelnice
- Czech First League: 3rd
- Czech Cup: Quarter-final
- UEFA Europa League: Second qualifying round
colours	Away colours
- All statistics correct as of 27 April 2021.

The 2020–21 FK Jablonec season is the club's 76th season in existence and its 27th consecutive season in the top flight of Czech football. In addition to the domestic league, Jablonec participated in this season's edition of the Czech Cup and the UEFA Europa League. The season covers the period from 1 July 2020 to 30 June 2021.

== Players ==
=== First-team squad ===
As of 13 February 2020.

Note: Flags indicate national team as defined under FIFA eligibility rules; some limited exceptions apply. Players may hold more than one non-FIFA nationality.

No.	Pos.	Nation	Player
1	GK	CZE	Jan Hanuš
3	MF	CZE	Tomáš Hübschman
4	DF	CZE	Jakub Jugas (on loan from Slavia Prague)
5	DF	CZE	David Štěpánek
6	MF	CZE	Tomáš Pilík
7	MF	SVK	Jakub Považanec
8	MF	CZE	Jan Sýkora (on loan from Slavia Prague)
9	MF	MNE	Zoran Petrović
10	MF	CZE	Miloš Kratochvíl
13	DF	CZE	Dominik Plechatý (on loan from Sparta Prague)
14	MF	FIN	Kasper Hämäläinen
15	FW	CZE	Martin Doležal
16	DF	CZE	Jan Krob
17	MF	CZE	David Macháček

No.	Pos.	Nation	Player
18	MF	URU	Rafael Acosta
19	FW	CZE	Jan Chramosta
20	DF	CZE	Libor Holík
21	MF	CZE	Jan Matoušek (on loan from Slavia Prague)
24	MF	CZE	Dominik Pleštil
25	MF	MNE	Vladimir Jovović
27	MF	CZE	Vojtěch Kubista
28	MF	CZE	Jaroslav Peřina
30	GK	CZE	Vlastimil Hrubý
31	MF	CZE	Dominik Breda
32	FW	CZE	Oliver Velich
33	GK	CZE	Adam Richter
95	MF	CZE	Michal Černák
—	DF	CZE	Michal Jeřábek
—	MF	CZE	Václav Pilař
—	MF	CZE	Robert Hrubý (on loan from Baník Ostrava)

== Pre-season and friendlies ==
Win Draw Loss Fixtures

1 August 2020 Friendly	Viktoria Žižkov	3–1	Jablonec	Žižkov
10:00 CEST (UTC+2)	Žežulka 33'; Diviš 37'; Březina 69'	Summary	Schranz 9'	Stadium: eFotbal Arena; Attendance: 0

5 August 2020 Friendly	Jablonec	1–1	Pardubice	Jablonec nad Nisou
16:30 CEST (UTC+2)	Hrubý 33'	Summary	Lee Sang-hyuk 54'	Stadium: Hřiště TJ Lázně Bělohrad

8 August 2020 Friendly	Bohemians	0–0	Jablonec	Prague
12:00 CEST (UTC+2)		Summary		Stadium: Stadion FC Čechie Uhříněves

15 August 2020 Friendly	Jablonec	2–1	Vysočina Jihlava	Jablonec nad Nisou
14:00 CEST (UTC+2)	Hrubý 26'; Schranz 40'	Summary	Křišťál 35'	Stadium: Stadion Střelnice

4 September 2020 Friendly	Jablonec	3–1	Varnsdorf	Jablonec nad Nisou
11:30 CEST (UTC+2)	Krob 30'; Chramosta 38'; Považanec 83'	Summary	Schön 48'	Stadium: Stadion Střelnice

6 January 2021 Friendly	Dynamo Dresden	2–1	Jablonec	Dresden
14:00 CET (UTC+1)	Becker 37'; Diawusie 48'	Report	Doležal 79'	Attendance: 0

== Competitions ==
=== Overview ===
Competition	First match	Last match	Starting round	Final position	Record							
Competition	First match	Last match	Starting round	Final position	Pld	W	D	L	GF	GA	GD	Win %
Czech First League	22 August 2020	29 May 2021	Matchday 1	3rd	34	21	6	7	59	33	+26	61.76
Czech Cup	27 March 2021	7 April 2021	Third round	Quarter-final	3	2	0	1	7	6	+1	66.67
Europa League	17 September 2020	17 September 2020	Second qualifying round	Second qualifying round	1	0	0	1	3	5	−2	0.00
Total					38	23	6	9	69	44	+25	60.53

Last updated: 29 May 2021
Source: Competitions

=== Czech First League ===
==== League table ====
Pos	Team	Pld	W	D	L	GF	GA	GD	Pts	Qualification or relegation
1	Slavia Prague (C)	34	26	8	0	85	20	+65	86	Qualification for the Champions League third qualifying round
2	Sparta Prague	34	23	5	6	82	43	+39	74	Qualification for the Champions League second qualifying round
3	Jablonec	34	21	6	7	59	33	+26	69	Qualification for the Europa League third qualifying round
4	Slovácko	34	19	6	9	58	33	+25	63	Qualification for the Europa Conference League second qualifying round
5	Viktoria Plzeň	34	17	7	10	60	45	+15	58	Qualification for the Europa Conference League second qualifying round

Source: Fortuna Liga
Rules for classification: 1) Points; 2) Head-to-head points; 3) Head-to-head goal difference; 4) Head-to-head goals scored; 5) Goal difference; 6) Goals scored; 7) Fair-play ranking; 8) Draw.
(C) Champions

===== Results summary =====
Overall								Home						Away					
Pld	W	D	L	GF	GA	GD	Pts	W	D	L	GF	GA	GD	W	D	L	GF	GA	GD
34	21	6	7	59	33	+26	69	13	2	2	34	16	+18	8	4	5	25	17	+8

Last updated: 29 May 2021.

===== Results by round =====
Round	1	2	3	4	5	6	7	8	9	10	11	12	13	14	15	16	17	18	19	20	21	22	23	24	25	26	27	28	29	30	31	32	33	34
Ground	H	A	H	A	H	A	H	A	H	A	H	A	H	A	A	H	A	H	A	H	A	H	A	H	A	H	A	H	A	H	H	A	H	A
Result	W	D	W	L	W	L	L	W	W	W	W	D	W	W	W	W	L	L	W	D	W	W	W	W	D	W	D	W	W	W	W	L	D	W
Position	8	6	4	7	5	6	8	5	3	5	2	3	3	2	2	2	3	4	3	4	4	4	4	3	2	2	2	2	2	2	2	3	3	3

Updated to match(es) played on 29 May 2021. Source:
A = Away; H = Home; W = Win; D = Draw; L = Loss

==== Regular stage ====
23 August 2020 1	Jablonec	1–0	Pardubice	Jablonec nad Nisou
16:30 CEST (UTC+2)	Hrubý 61'; Podaný (yellow card) 83'	Report	Tischler (yellow card) 8'	Stadium: Stadion Střelnice; Attendance: 1,531; Referee: Petr Ardeleánu

29 August 2020 2	Slovácko	1–1	Jablonec	Uherské Hradiště
17:00 CEST (UTC+2)	Cicilia 48', (yellow card) 58'; Reinberk (yellow card) 59'; Daníček (yellow card) 62'; Havlík (yellow card) 78'; Kohút (yellow card) 89'	Report	Hrubý (yellow card) 33'; Holík (yellow card) 44'; Kratochvíl (yellow card) 71'; Chramosta 79'	Stadium: Městský stadion Attendance: 2,000; Referee: Ondřej Pechanec

12 September 2020 3	Jablonec	2–0	Baník Ostrava	Jablonec nad Nisou
17:00 CEST (UTC+2)	Schranz 61'; Zelený 76'; Holík (yellow card) 90+1'	Report	Fillo (yellow card) 38'; Potočný (yellow card) 47'; Šašinka (yellow card) 69'; Laštůvka 74'	Stadium: Stadion Střelnice; Attendance: 2,436; Referee: Jan Machálek

21 September 2020 4	Mladá Boleslav	2–0	Jablonec	Mladá Boleslav
18:00 CEST (UTC+2)	Zahustel 30'; Fulnek (yellow card) 35'; Škoda (yellow card) 84'; Mašek 86'	Report	Martinec (yellow card) 51'; Čvančara (yellow card) 88'	Stadium: Lokotrans Aréna; Attendance: 1,260; Referee: Pavel Královec

27 September 2020 5	Jablonec	4–1	Opava	Jablonec nad Nisou
15:30 CEST (UTC+2)	Didiba 3' (o.g.); Štěpánek (yellow card) 25'; Hübschman 37'; Schranz 73'; Považanec 90+3'	Report	Martinec (yellow card) 51'; Čvančara (yellow card) 88'	Stadium: Stadion Střelnice; Attendance: 1,810; Referee: Karel Hrubes

3 October 2020 6	Sparta Prague	2–1	Jablonec	Prague
19:00 CEST (UTC+2)	Juliš 30'; Hložek 34'; Plechatý (yellow card) 67'; Dočkal (yellow card) 90+3'	Report	Štěpánek (yellow card) 41'; Čvančara 76', (yellow card) 79'	Stadium: Stadion Letná; Attendance: 1,931; Referee: Ondřej Pechanec

6 November 2020 7	Jablonec	0–1	Brno	Jablonec nad Nisou
18:00 CET (UTC+1)	Krob (yellow card) 73'; Hrubý (yellow card) 90+2'	Report	Štepanovský (yellow card) 48'; Přichystal 54'	Stadium: Stadion Střelnice; Attendance: 0 Referee: Ondřej Berka

20 November 2020 8	Slovan Liberec	1–3	Jablonec	Liberec
18:45 CET (UTC+1)	Mara 28'; Rondić (yellow card) 42'; Sadílek (yellow card) 80'; Jhon Mosquera (yellow card) 83'	Report	Koscelník 2' (o.g.); Krob (yellow card) 28'; Pilař (yellow card) 40'; Martinec (yellow card) 58'; Holík (yellow card) 61'; Schranz 71', (yellow card) 83'; Zelený 83'	Stadium: Stadion u Nisy; Attendance: 0 Referee: Miroslav Zelinka

8 December 2020 9	Jablonec	2–1	Bohemians	Jablonec
17:00 CET (UTC+1)	Hrubý 21'; Považanec (yellow card) 42'; Kubista (yellow card) 61', (goal) 68'; Schranz (yellow card) 77'; Krob (yellow card) 86'	Report	Hronek (yellow card) 10'; Köstl (yellow card) 20'; Vondra (yellow card) 30'; Levin (yellow card) 37'; Novak 86'	Stadium: Stadion Střelnice; Attendance: 0 Referee: Petr Ardeleanu

4 December 2020 10	Fastav Zlín	0–2	Jablonec	Zlín
18:00 CET (UTC+1)	Poznar (yellow card) 40', (yellow card) 45' (yellow-red card); Rondić (yellow card) 42'; Sadílek (yellow card) 80'; Mosquera (yellow card) 83'	Report	Holík (yellow card) 45+2'; Krob (yellow card) 65'; Pilař 71'; Schranz 84' (pen.)	Stadium: Letná Stadion; Attendance: 0 Referee: Ondřej Berka

12 December 2020 11	Jablonec	3–2	Viktoria Plzeň	Jablonec
18:30 CET (UTC+1)	Schranz (yellow card) 23'; Martinec (yellow card) 29'; Doležal 58'; Zelený 66'; Ladra 77'; Kubista (yellow card) 79'	Report	Bucha 12'; Beauguel 45+1'; Čermák (yellow card) 56'; Havel (yellow card) 71'; Káčer (yellow card) 90+3'	Stadium: Stadion Střelnice; Attendance: 0 Referee: Karel Hrubes

15 December 2020 12	Karviná	2–2	Jablonec	Karviná
14:00 CET (UTC+1)	Bartošák (yellow card) 59'; Papadopulos (yellow card) 67'; Ndefe (yellow card) 69'; Haša 87', 90'	Report	Shranz 25'; Doležal 84'; Považanec (yellow card) 86'	Stadium: Městský stadion Attendance: 0 Referee: Josef Petrik

19 December 2020 13	Jablonec	2–1	Dynamo České Budějovice	Jablonec nad Nisou
14:00 CET (UTC+1)	Schranz 20', (yellow card) 43'; Pilař 61'; Podaný (yellow card) 66'	Report	van Buren 70'; Brandner (yellow card) 72'; Ledecky (yellow card) 82'	Stadium: Stadion Střelnice; Attendance: 0 Referee: Ondřej Cieslar

22 December 2020 14	Sigma Olomouc	1–3	Jablonec	Olomouc
15:00 CET (UTC+1)	Chytil 24'; Hubník (yellow card) 67'	Report	Doležal 36', 84'; Jan Krob (yellow card) 40'; Hübschman (yellow card) 56'; Ladra 67' (pen.); Martinec (yellow card) 81'	Stadium: Andrův stadion Attendance: 0 Referee: Petr Hocek

15 January 2021 15	Teplice	0–5	Jablonec	Teplice
18:00 CET (UTC+1)	Gabriel (yellow card) 52'	Report	Považanec 22'; Jovović 34'; Kratochvíl 39', (yellow card) 62'; Krob 56'; Hrubý 89'	Stadium: AGC Arena; Attendance: 0 Referee: Pavel Franek

24 January 2021 16	Jablonec	2–1	Příbram	Jablonec nad Nisou
14:00 CET (UTC+1)	Kratochvíl 53', 64' (pen.); Hübschman (yellow card) 79'; Haitl (yellow card) 89'	Report	Pilík (yellow card) 28'; Nový 49'	Stadium: Stadion Střelnice; Attendance: 0 Referee: Miroslav Zelinka

31 January 2021 17	Slavia Prague	3–0	Jablonec	Prague
18:30 CET (UTC+1)	Sima 20', (yellow card) 55'; Holeš (yellow card) 26'; Kuchta 38'; Martinec 58' (o.g.); Bah (yellow card) 81'	Report		Stadium: Sinobo Stadium; Attendance: 0 Referee: Pavel Orel

14 February 2021 19	Baník Ostrava	2–1	Jablonec	Ostrava
16:00 CET (UTC+1)	Dyjan 17' (pen.), 38' (pen.); Jánoš (yellow card) 84'; Fillo (yellow card) 84'	Report	Kubista 20', (yellow card) 89'; Kratochvíl (penalty missed); Jovović (yellow card) 84'; Martinec (yellow card) 84'	Stadium: Městský stadion Attendance: 0 Referee: Ondrej Berka

19 February 2021 20	Jablonec	1–1	Mladá Boleslav	Jablonec nad Nisou
16:00 CET (UTC+1)	Kratochvíl 36'; Martinec (yellow card) 41'	Report	Šimek 16'; Malínský (yellow card) 39'	Stadium: Stadion Střelnice; Attendance: 0 Referee: Emanuel Marek

24 February 2021 18	Jablonec	0–3	Slovácko	Jablonec nad Nisou
14:00 CET (UTC+1)	Jovović (red card) 53'	Report	Hofmann (yellow card) 14'; Kadlec (yellow card) 35'; Jurečka (yellow card) 37'; Petržela 45+1'; Kliment 68'; Cicilia 79'	Stadium: Stadion Střelnice; Attendance: 0 Referee: Petr Hocek

27 February 2021 21	Opava	0–1	Jablonec	Opava
14:00 CET (UTC+1)	Tiéhi (yellow card) 44'; Didiba (yellow card) 89'	Report	Doležal 51'; Podaný (yellow card) 68'; Krob (yellow card) 88'	Stadium: Stadium Municipal Gardens; Attendance: 0 Referee: Jan Machálek

14 March 2021 23	Zbrojovka Brno	1–2	Jablonec	Brno
16:00 CET (UTC+1)	Pavel Dreksa (yellow card) 35'; Pachlopník (yellow card) 64'; Fila 90+1'	Report	Pleštil 10'; Schranz 73'; Kratochvíl (yellow card) 75'	Stadium: Městský fotbalový stadion Srbská; Attendance: 0 Referee: Karel Hrubeš

20 March 2021 24	Jablonec	2–1	Slovan Liberec	Jablonec nad Nisou
18:30 CET (UTC+1)	Schranz 17' (yellow card) 60'; Kubista 54'	Report	Rabušic 52' (pen.)	Stadium: Stadion Střelnice; Attendance: 0 Referee: Zbyněk Proske

2 April 2021 25	Bohemians	0–0	Jablonec	Prague
18:00 CEST (UTC+2)	Hronek (yellow card) 61'; Puškáč (yellow card) 67'	Report	Haitl (yellow card) 9'; Hrubý (yellow card) 90+1'; Krob (yellow card) 90+4'	Stadium: Stadion FC Čechie Uhříněves; Attendance: 0 Referee: Ondřej Pechanec

10 April 2021 26	Jablonec	3–1	Fastav Zlín	Jablonec nad Nisou
14:00 CEST (UTC+2)	Kubista 48'; Jovovič 51'; Považanec 87'	Report	Janetzký 90+2'; Procházka (yellow card) 38'; Janošek (yellow card) 71'	Stadium: Stadion Střelnice; Attendance: 0 Referee: Jan Machálek

14 April 2021 22	Jablonec	1–0	Sparta Prague	Jablonec
18:00 CEST (UTC+2)	Kratochvíl (yellow card) 27'; Schranz 87'	Report	Polidar (yellow card) 63'; Plavšić (yellow card) 80'	Stadium: Stadion Střelnice; Attendance: 0 Referee: Karel Hrubeš

17 April 2021 27	Viktoria Plzeň	1–1	Jablonec	Plzeň
18:30 CEST (UTC+2)	Ba Loua 41'; Limberský (yellow card) 62'; Káčer (yellow card) 68'	Report	Krob (yellow card) 25'; Zeleny (yellow card) 59'; Schranz 70'	Stadium: Doosan Arena; Attendance: 0 Referee: Pavel Franek

20 April 2021 28	Jablonec	3–0	Karviná	Jablonec
17:00 CEST (UTC+2)	Schranz 9' (pen.); Doležal 19'; Pleštil 40'	Report	Santos (yellow card) 8'; Herc (yellow card) 29'	Stadium: Stadion Střelnice; Attendance: 0 Referee: Ondřej Lerch

24 April 2021 29	Dynamo České Budějovice	0–2	Jablonec	České Budějovice
14:00 CEST (UTC+2)	Čavoš (yellow card) 20'	Report	Doležal 17', 42'; Zelený (yellow card) 34'; Schranz (yellow card) 79'; Kratochvíl (yellow card) 82'	Stadium: Stadion Střelecký ostrov Attendance: 0 Referee: Pavel Orel

2 May 2021 30	Jablonec	3–1	Sigma Olomouc	Jablonec nad Nisou
15:00 CEST (UTC+2)	Kratochvíl (yellow card) 16' (yellow-red card) 30'; Schranz (yellow card) 39' (goal) 45' (pen.) 65'; Doležal 68'; Považanec (yellow card) 81'	Report	Poulolo (yellow card) 11'; Vepřek (yellow card) 34'; Hála (yellow card) 38'; Breite (yellow card) 45+1'; Látal 13' (yellow card) 73'	Stadium: Stadion Střelnice; Attendance: 450

7 May 2021 31	Jablonec	4–1	Teplice	Jablonec nad Nisou
18:00 CEST (UTC+2)	Doležal 3', 41', 73'; Kubista 48'	Report	Vondrášek (yellow card) 47'; Jukl 61'; Mazuch (yellow card) 82'; Hyčka (yellow card) 86'	Stadium: Stadion Střelnice; Attendance: 0 Referee: Ondřej Berka

15 May 2021 32	Příbram	1–0	Jablonec	Příbram
17:00 CEST (UTC+2)	Mezera (yellow card) 3' (goal) 77'; Pilík (yellow card) 58'; Antwi (yellow card) 88'	Report	Kratochvíl (yellow card) 34'; Zelený (yellow card) 57'; Pleštil (yellow card) 60'; Rada (manager) (yellow card) 90+2'	Stadium: Stadion Na Litavce; Attendance: 162; Referee: Emanuel Marek

23 May 2021 33	Jablonec	1–1	Slavia Prague	Jablonec nad Nisou
17:00 CEST (UTC+2)	Štěpánek (yellow card) 7'; Doležal 15'; Považanec (yellow card) 29'; Krob (yellow card) 90'; Jovović (yellow card) 90+2'	Report	Lingr 6'; Dorley (yellow card) 52'; Kacharaba (yellow card) 78'	Stadium: Stadion Střelnice; Attendance: 747; Referee: Ondřej Pechanec

29 May 2021 34	Pardubice	0–1	Jablonec	Pardubice
17:00 CEST (UTC+2)		Report	Doležal 56'	Stadium: Pod Vinicí; Attendance: 555; Referee: Pavel Orel

=== UEFA Europa League ===
17 September 2020 Q2	DAC Dunajská Streda (Slovakia)	5–3 (a.e.t.)	(Czech Republic) Jablonec	Dunajská Streda, Slovakia
20:45	Divković 6', 65'; Nicolaescu 85', 96'; Davis 114'	Report	Zelený 26'; Schranz 57', 71' (pen.)	Stadium: MOL Aréna; Attendance: 0 Referee: Marco Di Bello (Italy)

=== Czech Cup ===
cancelled 3rd round	FK Jablonec	3–0	SK Líšeň
		Report
Note: walkover

27 March 2021 4th round	FC Sellier & Bellot Vlašim	2–3	FK Jablonec	Vlašim
14:00	Cervenka 34'; Bassey 80'	Report	Pilař 23' (pen.), 58', 64' (pen.)	Stadium: Stadion Kollárova ulice

7 April 2021 Quarter-final	AC Sparta Prague	4–1	FK Jablonec	Prague
15:30	Krejčí 49', 69'; Krejčí 81'; Moberg Karlsson 84'	Report	Schranz 47'	Stadium: Great Strahov Stadium
