= William Palacios =

Domingo Sánchez may refer to:

- William Palacios (footballer, born 1994), Colombian football midfielder for Deportivo Achuapa
- William Palacios (footballer, born 2000), Colombian football midfielder for Feirense

== See also ==
- William Palacio (born 1965), Colombian cyclist
