= Filip Havelka =

Czech footballer

Personal information
- Date of birth: 21 January 1998 (age 28)
- Place of birth: Prague, Czech Republic
- Height: 1.77 m (5 ft 10 in)
- Position: Midfielder

Team information
- Current team: Arsenal Česká Lípa
- Number: 31

Youth career
- Aritma Prague
- 2007–2016: Sparta Prague

Senior career*
Years	Team	Apps	(Gls)
2016–2023	Sparta Prague	4	(0)
2017–2018	→ Slovan Liberec (loan)	12	(1)
2018–2020	→ Dynamo České Budějovice (loan)	45	(1)
2020–2021	→ Dynamo České Budějovice (loan)	21	(0)
2021–2022	→ Slovan Liberec (loan)	24	(0)
2022–2023	→ Dukla Prague (loan)	27	(1)
2023–2025	Teplice	26	(4)
2025	Dynamo České Budějovice	13	(0)
2026–	Arsenal Česká Lípa	0	(0)

International career^{‡}
2014	Czech Republic U16	1	(0)
2015–2016	Czech Republic U18	9	(0)
2016–2017	Czech Republic U19	13	(1)
2017–2018	Czech Republic U20	4	(0)
- * Club domestic league appearances and goals as of 17 June 2025 ‡ National team caps and goals as of 29 January 2019

Filip Havelka (born 21 January 1998) is a Czech professional footballer who plays as a midfielder for Arsenal Česká Lípa.

He made his senior league debut for Sparta Prague on 16 October 2016 in a Czech First League 3–0 home win against Jihlava. In July 2017, he went on loan to Liberec, another Czech First League side.

On 11 July 2023, Havelka signed a two-year contract with Teplice.

On 21 January 2025, Havelka signed a contract with Dynamo České Budějovice until June 2026.

On 3 August 2026, Havelka signed a multi-year contract with Arsenal Česká Lípa.
