= Riad Šuta =

Bosnian footballer (born 2002)

Personal information
- Date of birth: 29 June 2002 (age 24)
- Place of birth: Mostar, Bosnia and Herzegovina
- Height: 1.89 m (6 ft 2 in)
- Position: Defender

Team information
- Current team: Arsenal Česká Lípa

Youth career
- 2013–2017: Čapljina
- 2017–2021: Zrinjski Mostar

Senior career*
Years	Team	Apps	(Gls)
2021–2022	Posušje	13	(0)
2022–2025	GOŠK Gabela	91	(5)
2025–2026	Botoșani	12	(1)
2026–	Arsenal Česká Lípa	0	(0)
- * Club domestic league appearances and goals as of 16 May 2026

Riad Šuta (born 29 June 2002) is a Bosnian professional footballer who plays as a defender for Czech National Football League club Arsenal Česká Lípa.

== Club career ==
=== Arsenal Česká Lípa ===
On 3 September 2026, Šuta signed a contract with Czech National Football League club Arsenal Česká Lípa.

== Honours ==
GOŠK Gabela

- First League of Bosnia and Herzegovina: 2022–23
