= Olivier Vliegen =

Belgian footballer (born 1999)

Personal information
- Full name: Olivier Marc Vliegen
- Date of birth: 7 February 1999 (age 27)
- Place of birth: Bree, Belgium
- Height: 1.90 m (6 ft 3 in)
- Position: Goalkeeper

Team information
- Current team: Arsenal Česká Lípa
- Number: 99

Youth career
- Anderlecht

Senior career*
Years	Team	Apps	(Gls)
2018–2024	Slovan Liberec	51	(0)
2020–2021	→ Vlašim (loan)	5	(0)
2021	→ Senica (loan)	11	(0)
2024–2026	Jong Genk	9	(0)
2026–	Arsenal Česká Lípa	0	(0)
- * Club domestic league appearances and goals as of 21 January 2026

Olivier Vliegen (born 7 February 1999) is a Belgian professional footballer who plays as a goalkeeper for Arsenal Česká Lípa in the Czech National Football League.

== Career ==
After failing to make an appearance for Anderlecht, Belgium's most successful club, Vliegen trialed unsuccessfully with Sparta Prague, the most successful Czech team, before signing for Slovan Liberec in the Czech First League. He mostly appeared in the team's B squad in initial season. In 2020 he was loaned to Vlašim in the Czech National Football League.

In February 2021, he signed a half-season loan with Senica of the Slovak First Football League.

On 27 July 2024, Vliegen signed a two-season contract with Belgian Pro League club Genk with option for one season. He was assigned to the reserves squad Jong Genk in the Challenger Pro League.

On 25 June 2026, Vliegen signed a multi-year contract with Czech National Football League club Arsenal Česká Lípa.
