= FK Arsenal Česká Lípa =

Česká Lípa
- Full name: FK Arsenal Česká Lípa, z.s.
- Founded: 1927
- Ground: Městský stadion u Ploučnice, Česká Lípa, Czech Republic
- Capacity: 5,000
- Chairman: Petr Šimoník
- Manager: Stipe Matić
- League: Bohemian Football League
- 2025–26: 1st (promoted)
- Website: www.fkceskalipa.cz
Home colours

FK Arsenal Česká Lípa is a Czech football club located in Česká Lípa. It currently plays in the second tier of Czech football.

In the 1996–97, 1997–98 and 1998–99 seasons, the club played in the Czech 2. Liga.

In the 2011–12 season, Česká Lípa was a farm team for Czech 3. Liga side FK Baník Most.

In 2025–26 season, they won the Bohemian Football League and were promoted to the 2026–27 Czech National Football League.

== Historical names ==
- 1927 – ČsSK Česká Lípa
- 1945 – Sokol Česká Lípa
- 1946 – Sokol Železničáři Česká Lípa
- 1948 – Sokol Tatra Česká Lípa
- 1953 – DSO Spartak Česká Lípa
- 1960 – TJ Spoza Česká Lípa
- 1961 – TJ SZ Česká Lípa
- 1977 – TJ Vagonka Česká Lípa
- ? – FK Česká Lípa
- 2008 – Arsenal Česká Lípa

== Players ==
=== Current squad ===
As of 8 September 2026.

Note: Flags indicate national team as defined under FIFA eligibility rules; some limited exceptions apply. Players may hold more than one non-FIFA nationality.

No.	Pos.	Nation	Player
1	GK	CZE	Radek Novák
2	DF	CZE	Dominik Mašek (on loan from Slovan Liberec)
3	MF	GHA	Uzair Alhassan
4	DF	CZE	Matěj Vlk
5	FW	CIV	Alain Guei
7	DF	CZE	Patrik Haitl
8	DF	CZE	Václav Dudl
10	FW	CZE	Marek Červenka
11	MF	CZE	Ladislav Dufek
13	GK	CZE	Jan Šťovíček
14	MF	CZE	Adam Ondráček
17	MF	CZE	Patrick Slanina
18	DF	CZE	Ondřej Žežulka
19	FW	CZE	Matěj Šimon
20	MF	CZE	Filip Blecha

No.	Pos.	Nation	Player
21	MF	CZE	Filip Káža (on loan from Mladá Boleslav)
22	DF	CZE	Martin Kouřil
23	MF	CZE	Ondřej Vencl (on loan from Pardubice)
24	MF	CZE	Jan Vostřel
27	FW	NGR	Patrick Edeh (on loan from Slovan Liberec)
28	GK	CZE	Antonín Kadlec
31	MF	CZE	Filip Havelka
33	DF	CZE	František Matys
37	FW	CZE	Patrik Schön
44	DF	CZE	Adam Zouhar (on loan from Mladá Boleslav)
99	GK	BEL	Olivier Vliegen
—	FW	CZE	Daniel Michl
—	DF	BIH	Riad Šuta
—	FW	CRO	Noa Kljajić

== Honours ==
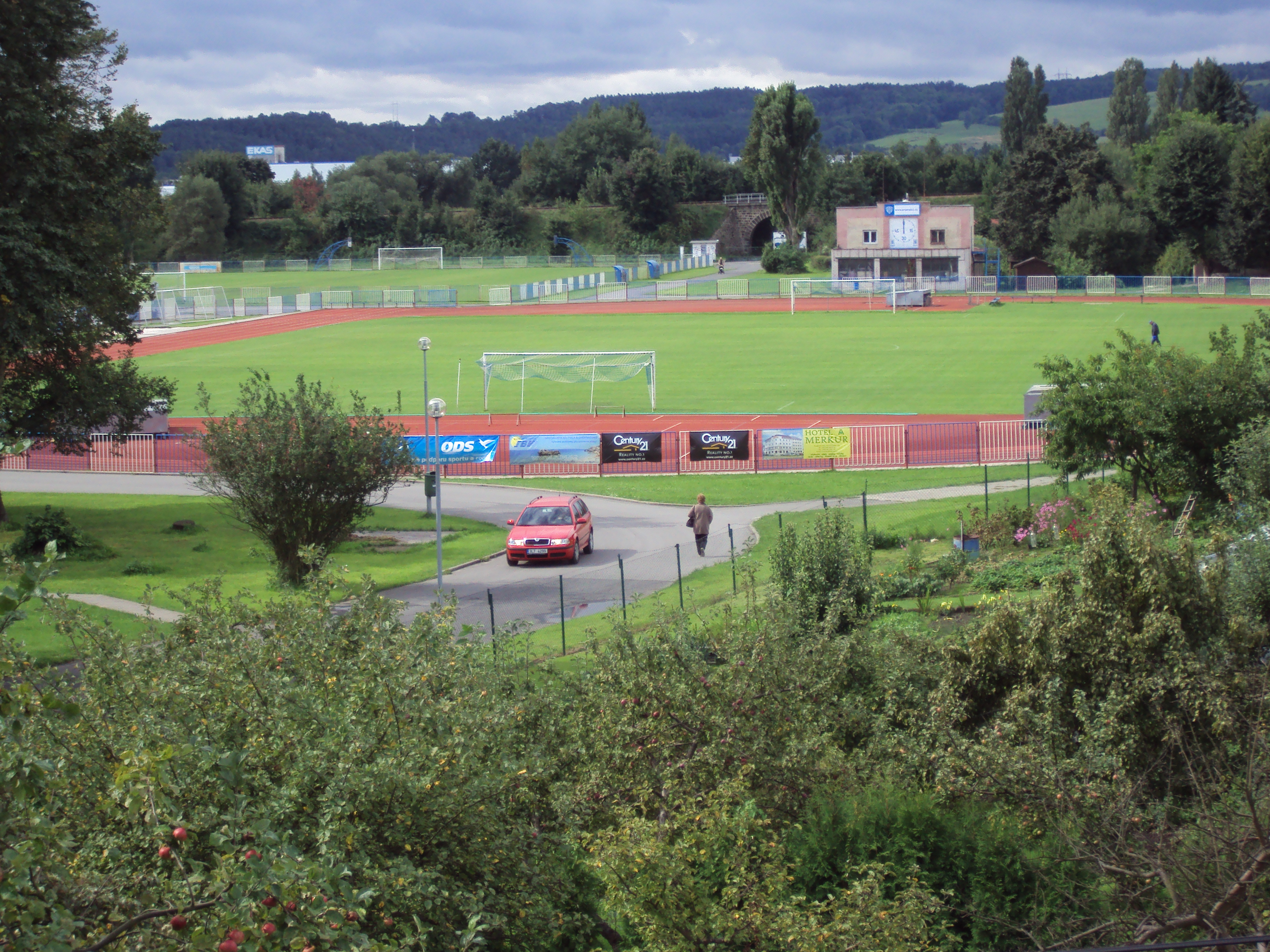
Main and training field

- Bohemian Football League
  - Champions: 2025–26
