= Miluše Poupětová =

Czech artist

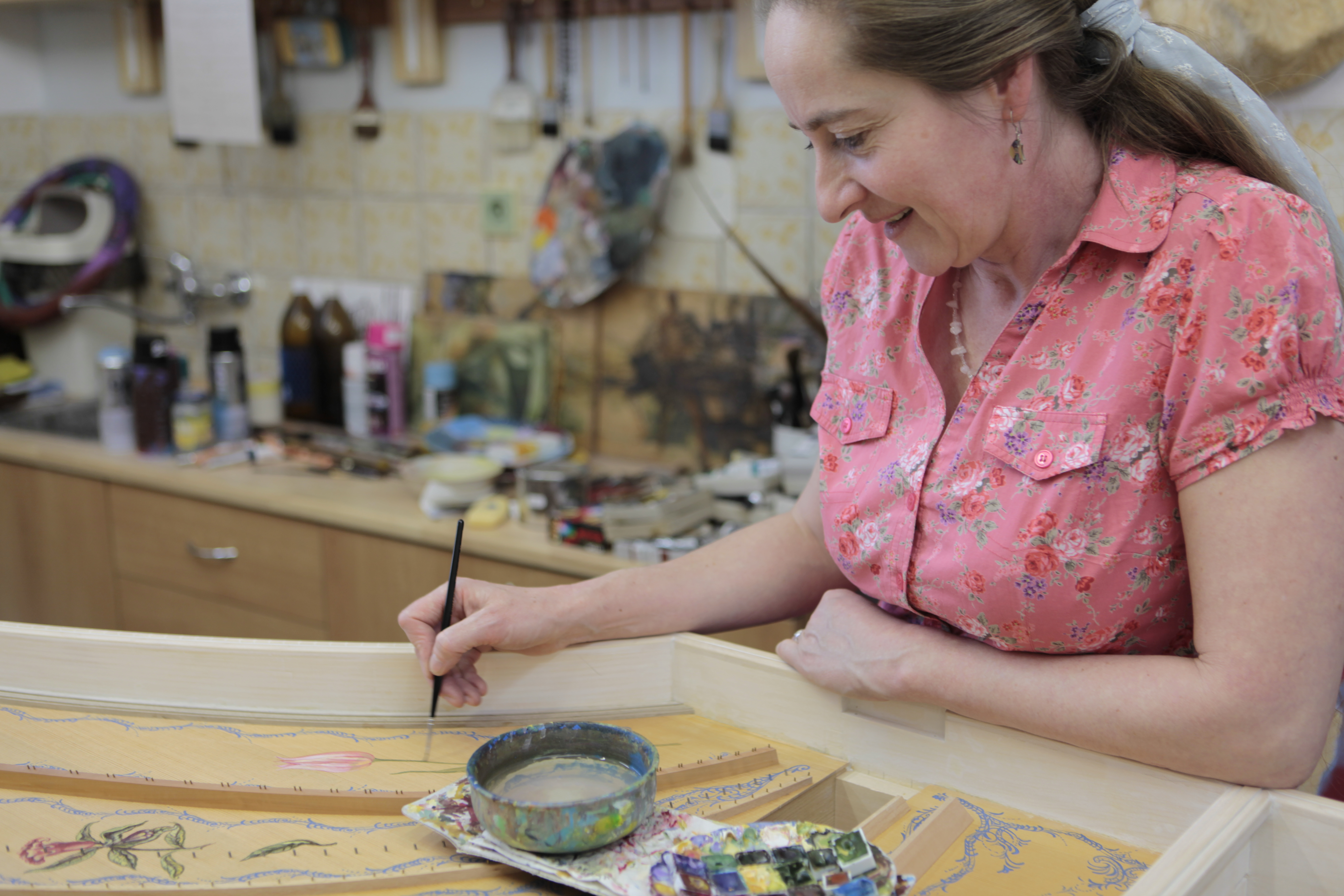
Miluše Poupětová in her home studio, 2013

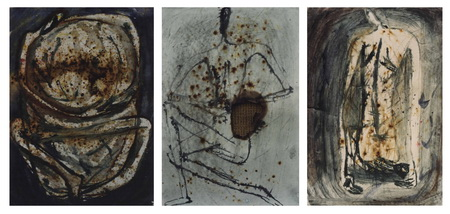
Hurt Sketchbooks, 1980-1990

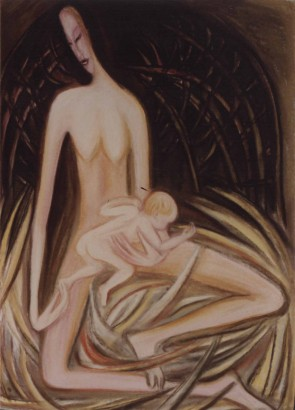
Among the Thorns, 1989

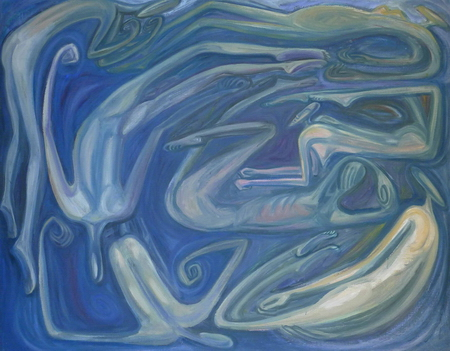
The Sea of Human Desires, 1994

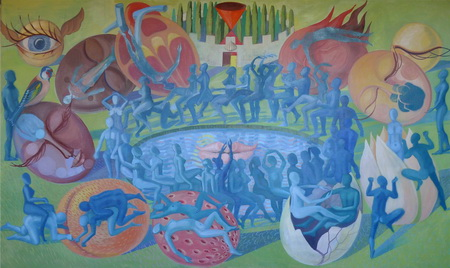
The Garden of Earthly Delights, 2011

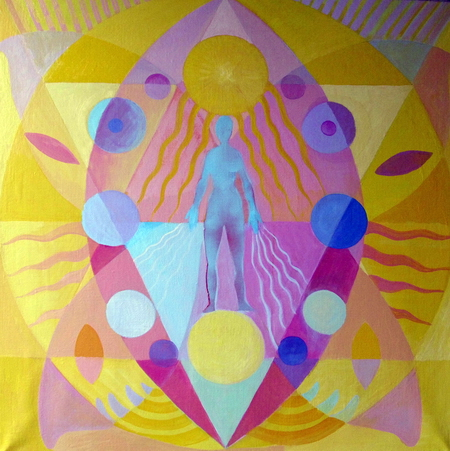
Vesica Piscis, 2012

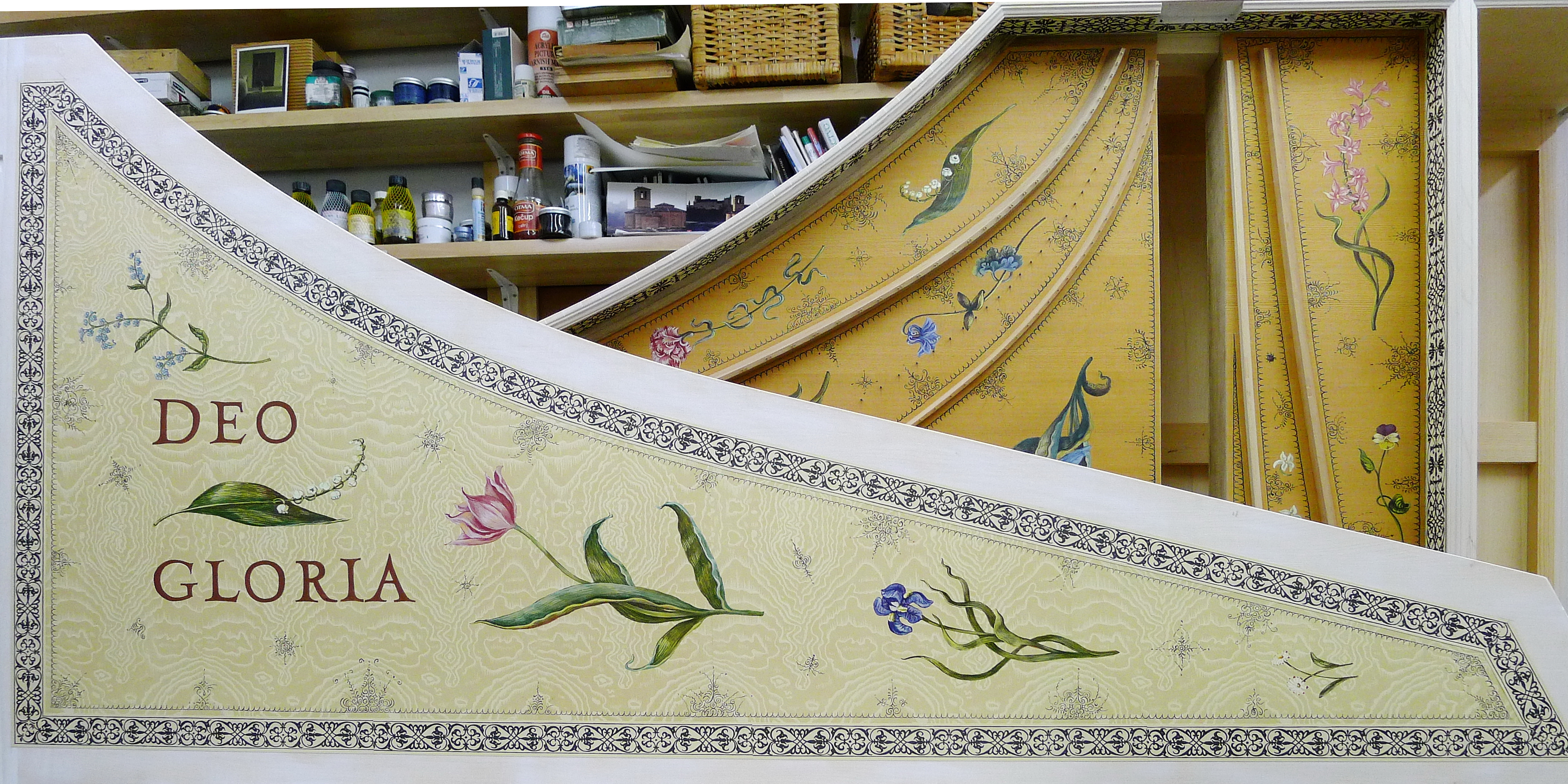
František Vyhnálek: Flemish harpsichord type, decoration: Miluše Poupětová

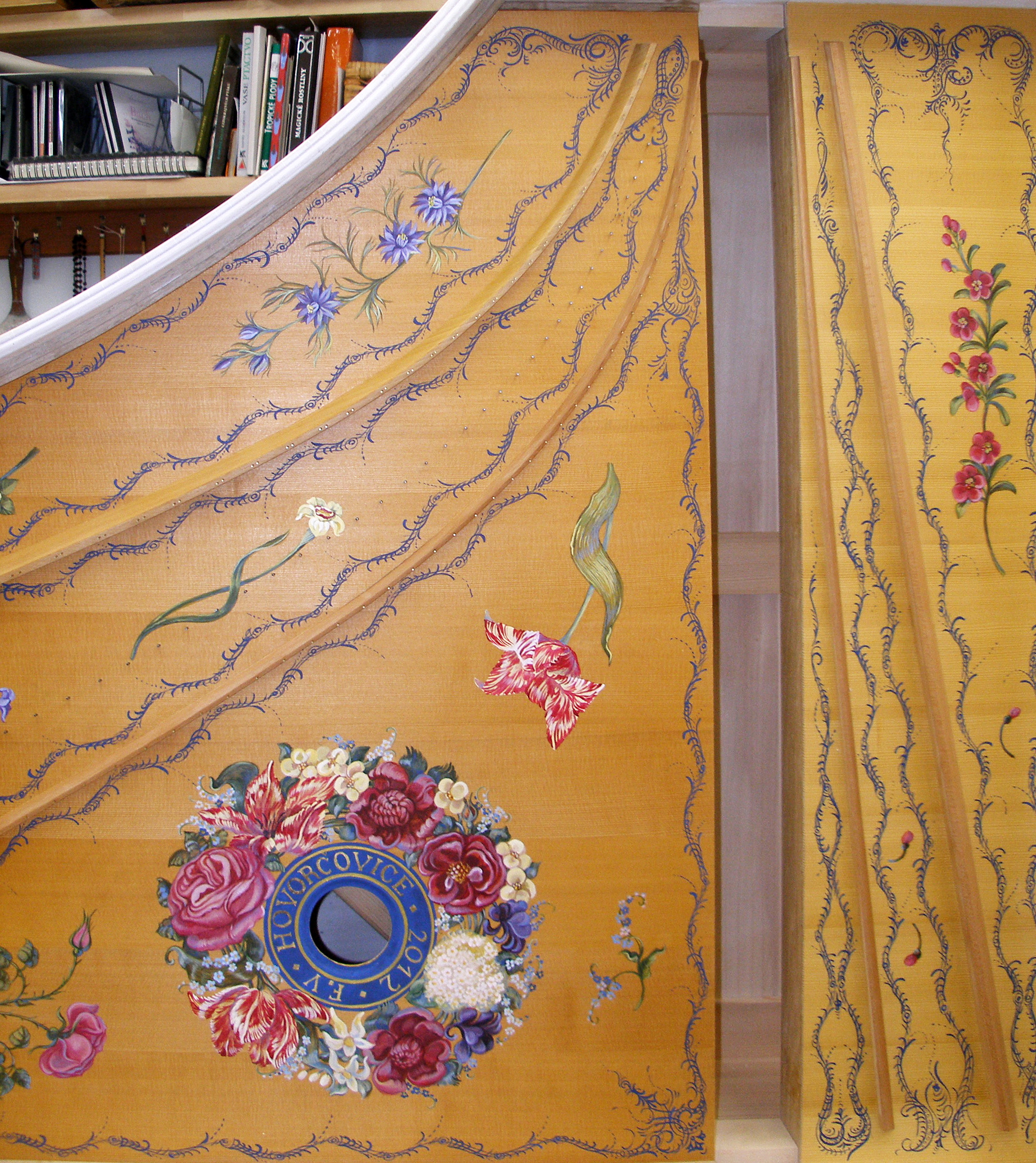
František Vyhnálek: French harpsichord type, decoration: Miluše Poupětová

Miluše Poupětová (* born Kautznerová, July 22, 1963 in Vlašim) is a Czech artist. She also teaches students of applied art at VOŠUP SUPŠ (Industrial Art College and Secondary School) in Prague. Her paintings are based on expressionism and monumental painting, and include abstract as well as figural elements. Her paintings follow her individual path to her soul, she is inspired by the physical experience of her own femininity as well as by oriental, Christian and psychoanalytic philosophy. The initial dark and exalted expressiveness of her early art work was gradually changed by brighter colours, well-thought-out compositions, more harmony and a more detached point of view.

== Studies and work ==
She graduated from the Industrial Art Secondary School in Prague (applied painting) and later from the Industrial Art College, the studio of applied painting headed by prof. Quido Fojtík. In the late 1980s, she studied at the PietroVannucci Fine Arts Academy in the Italian Perugia. Since 1991, she has been teaching at the VOŠUP SUPŠ calligraphy, figural drawing, painting technology and anatomy, nowadays she is the head of the Applied Painting Studio there. Apart from her pedagogical activities she also decorates musical instruments and makes decorative wall paintings.

== Detailed art biography ==
At the beginning of her art career, at the turn of the 1980s and 1990s, Miluše Poupětová dealt with two main topics, the first one was the role of women seen through the prism of her experienced motherhood, we may see this topic in her paintings as well as in her drawings. The second topic was the landscape. Her series called Hurt Sketchbook the bigger part of which is now in a private art collection in the USA combines several techniques (ink, natural pigments and dye substances undergo her destructive interventions – scratching, carving, polishing and burning). The colours from this period used in her paintings and drawings are dark, reflecting emotions like fear and worries. In her landscape painting, she focuses on little hidden places in the nature, seen from a subjective point of view, where the reflection is a frequent motif.

The exhibition U Řečických in 1992 showed a shift from the motherhood to a lonely woman figure in existential relations, the core of her art was moved to a more general symbolic level. She included meditation and yoga and worked also with the four Earth elements. In the middle of the 1990s, she processed her experience with the sea, her colours went brighter, her work became more colourful, figures in movements appeared, the feeling of isolation and loneliness were changed for vitality and energy. In the late 1990s, she focused on a half-figure with a more contemplative mood.

The subjectivity was disappearing gradually and more abstract pictures dealing with death and dying, the tragic life situations, appeared, namely in form of asphalt drawings and in the series of white pictures. The abstraction culminated in the series of pictures called The Heads where specific shapes encounter colourful abstraction, some pictures are inspired by natural mysticism and rituals dealing with the life cycle. The result is longing for the restoration of order reflected in the geometric figures. A series of pictures inspired by the Bible should be definitely mentioned in relation to her abstract art (Carpe Diem, 2009).

Gradually, the painter included figures again, this time in new and intense colours and in form of templates figures representing universal archetypes dealing with the relation of man and woman and the importance of individual fate within the world's anonymity.

Miluše Poupětová has been also decorating musical instruments for many years, namely harpsichords. She decorated for example instruments produced by František Vyhnálek from Hovorčovice. These harpsichords are now in Prague, Budapest, Würzburg, Paris, Boston or Kyoto. She mainly makes copies of Flemish instruments form the 17th century and of French instruments from the 18th century full of flowers, birds, garlands and landscapes.

The Flemish type of harpsichords is my favourite one, with very creative ornaments which never reoccur even though they create a style unity. They are always original, there are no two same instruments. They are painted in a calligraphic way, with paintbrushes of the highest quality.

She uses her own developed unique method for decorating the harpsichord body and its legs called marbling.

== Exhibitions ==
=== Individual exhibitions ===
- 1990 Zámek Vlašim
- 1992 Prague, Galerie mladých „U Řečických“
- 1994 Prague, Galerie mladých „U Řečických“
- 1996 Prague, Galerie SUPŠ
- 1999 Prague, bookshop „U Knihomola“
- 2003 Prague, internet café „Globe“
- 2004 Prague, Galerie Nová síň, Voršilská 3
- 2009 Prague, Carpe Diem
- 2012 Prague, 366 Days, Galerie ABF, Václavské náměstí 31
- 2012 Prague, 25/50, Velká galerie Chodovské tvrze, Ledvinova 9

=== Other exhibitions ===
- 1990 „CZECH INTROSPECTIVE“, Linhart Foundation, California
- 1991 Prague 4, Modrý Pavilon
- 1992 XIV. Concorso di Pittura ad Acquerello, „SINAIDE GHI“, Roma
- 1994 Jemniště Castle, together with students
- 1994 „TOLERANCE - INTOLERANCE“, Altkirch, France
- 1995 Jemniště Castle, together with students
- 2011 Jičín, castle „Pedagogové SUPŠ“
- 2011 Leeds, UK, University of Leeds, Corridor Gallery

== Gallery ==
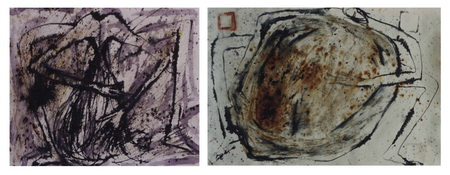
Hurt Sketchbook, 1980-1999

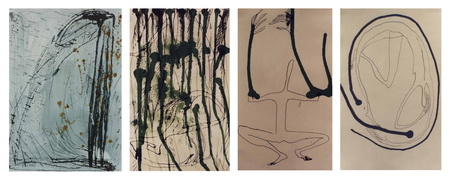
Hurt Sketchbook, 1980-1999

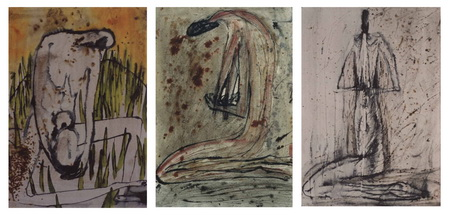
Hurt Sketchbook, 1980-1999

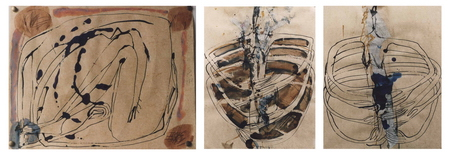
Hurt Sketchbook, 1980-1999

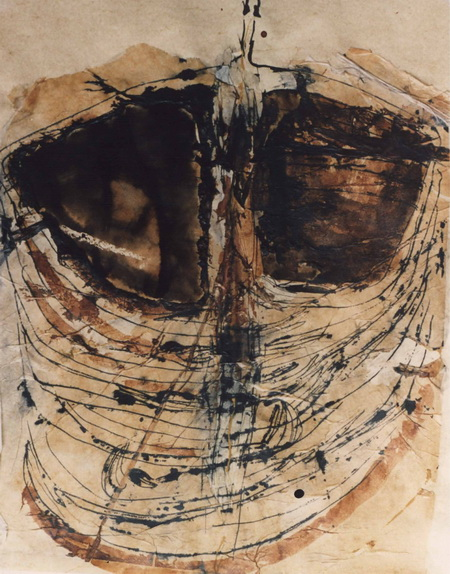
Hurt Sketchbook, 1980-1999

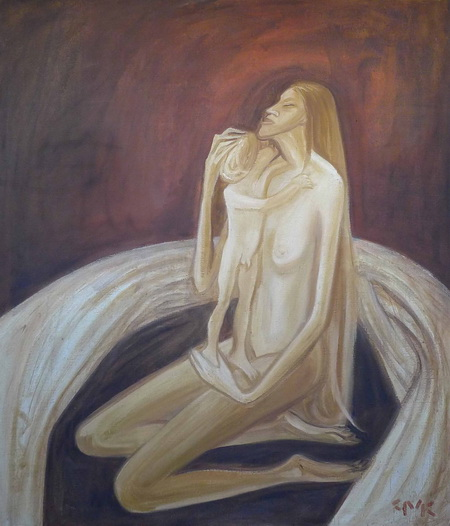
The Sweetest Kiss, 1989

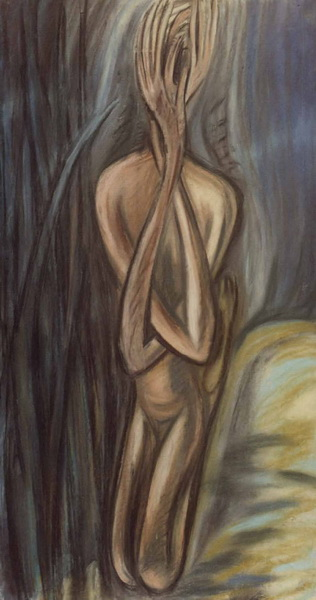
Hiding, 1989

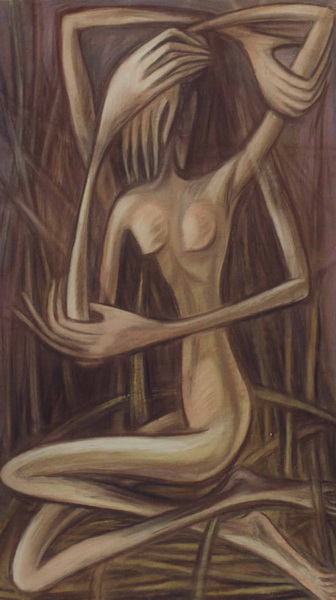
Among the Thorns, 1989

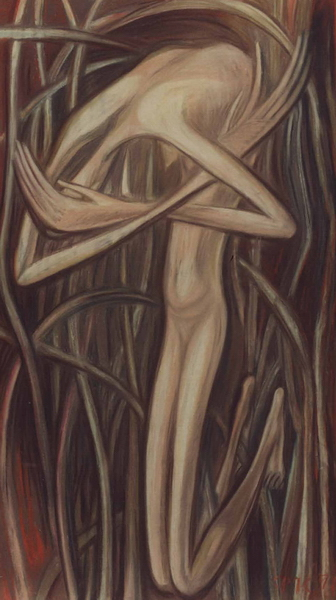
In Oneself, 1990

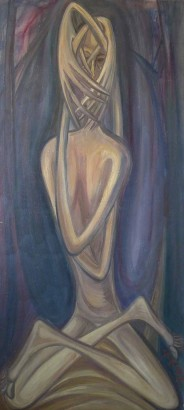
In Oneself, 1990

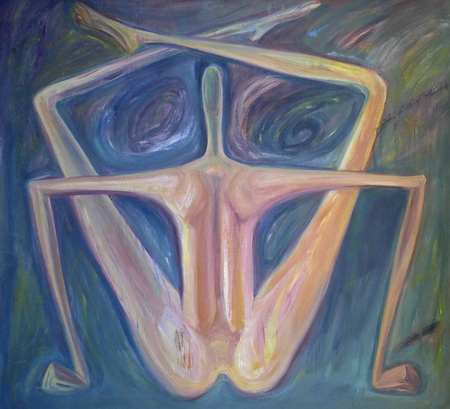
The Sea, 1994

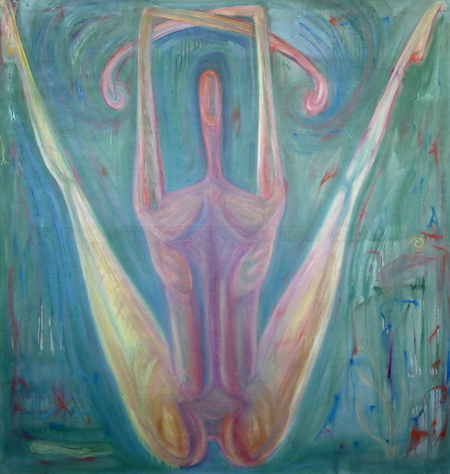
The Sea, 1994

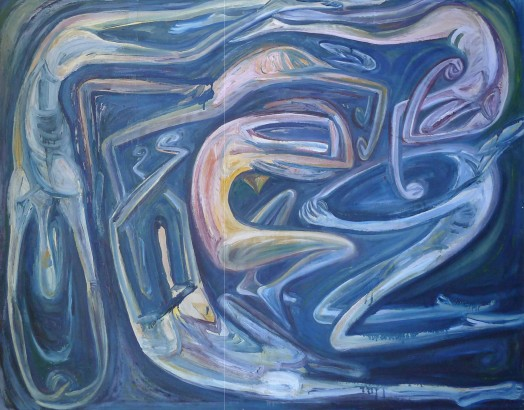
The Sea of Human Desires, 1994

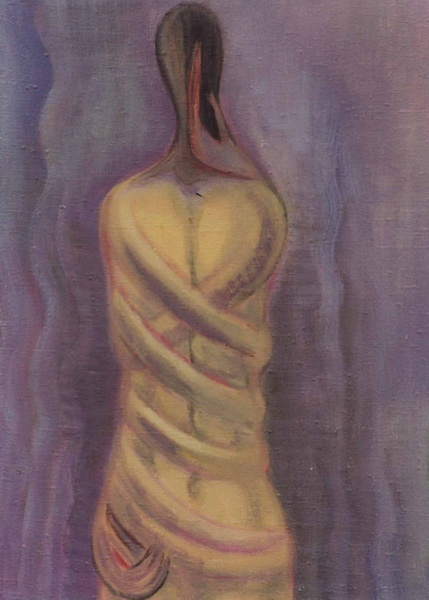
Sadness winds around me like a bitter herb, half figure, 1999

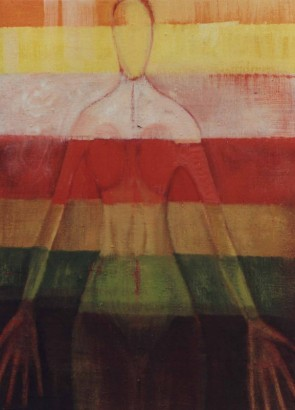
7 Days of My Creation, half figure, 1999

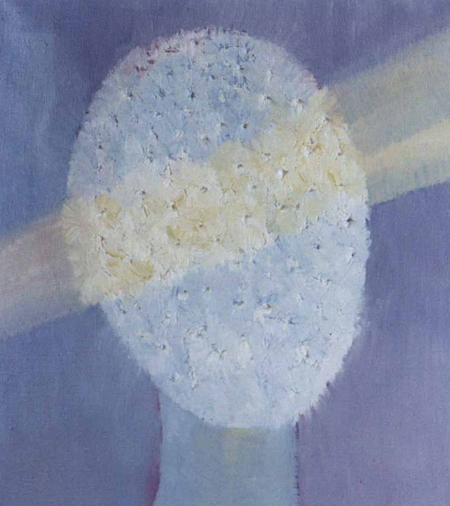
The Head, 2001-2004

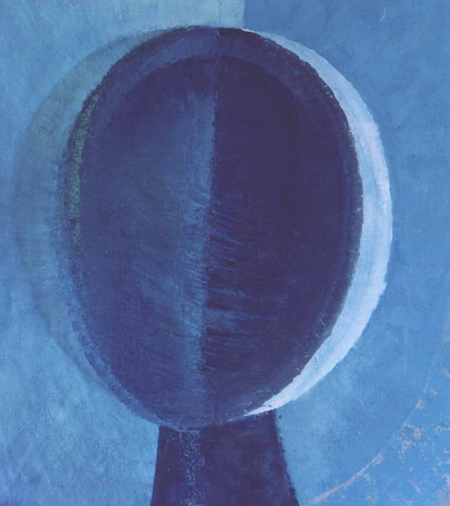
The Head, 2001-2004

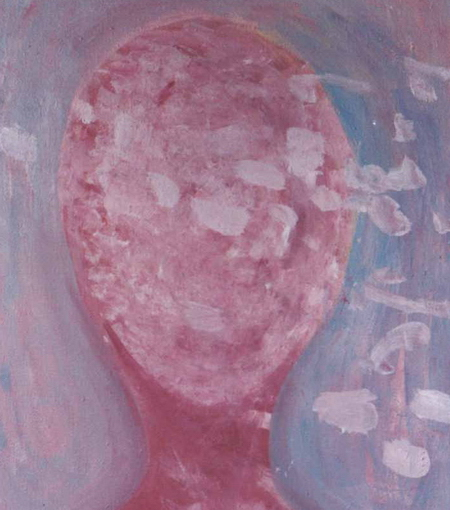
The Head, 2001-2004

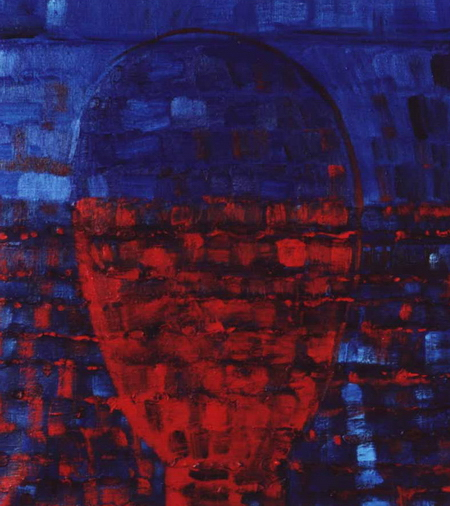
The Head, 2001-2004

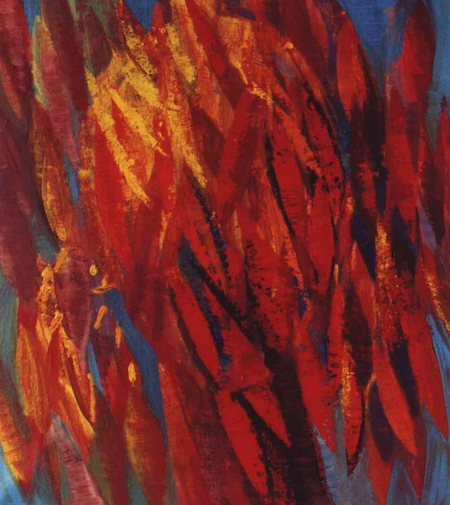
The Head, 2001-2004

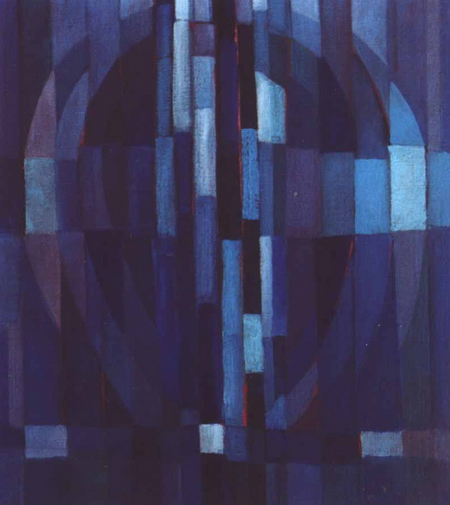
The Head, 2001-2004

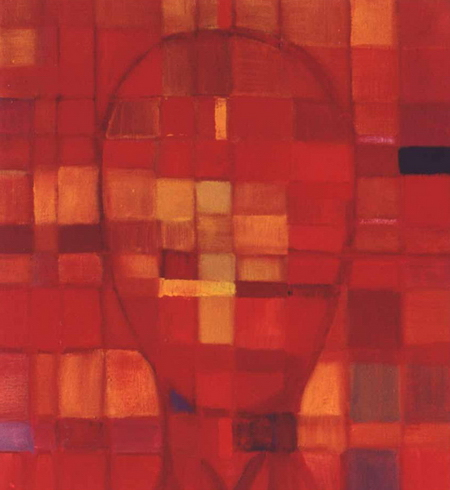
The Head, 2001-2004

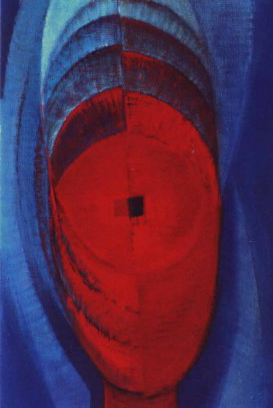
The Head, 2001-2004

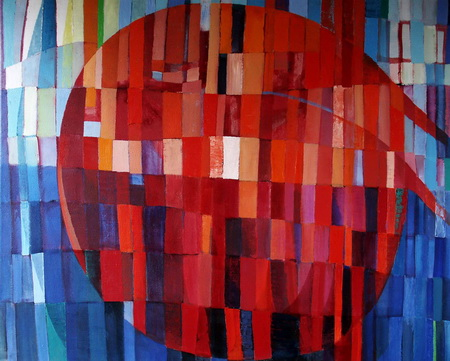
The Point in Which the Entire Time is Included / Paradise, 2008

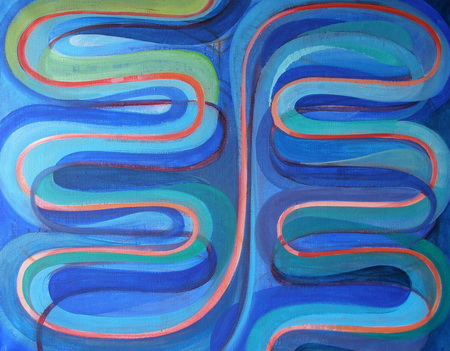
History Curve, 2008

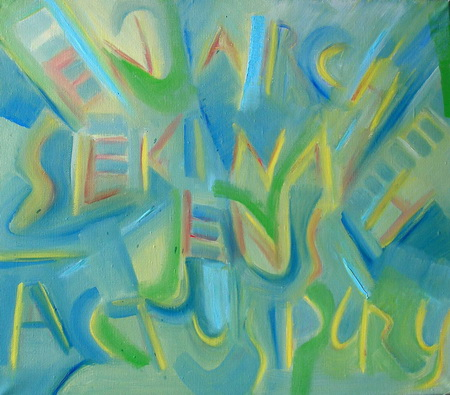
Sekinah, 2008

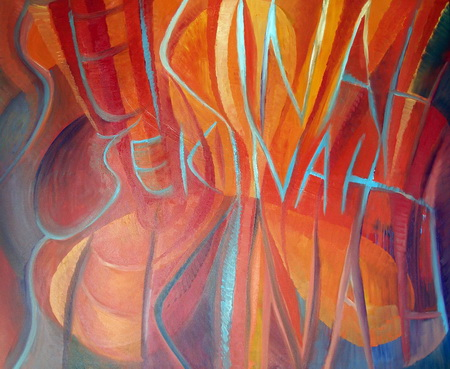
Sekinah, 2008

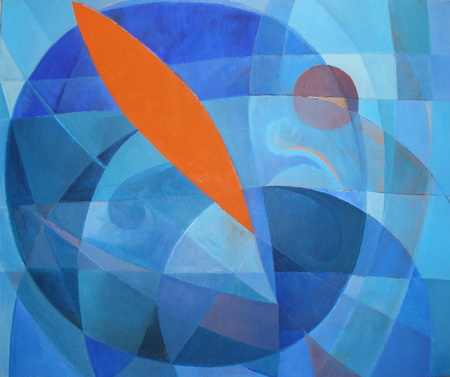
Word as a Sword, 2008

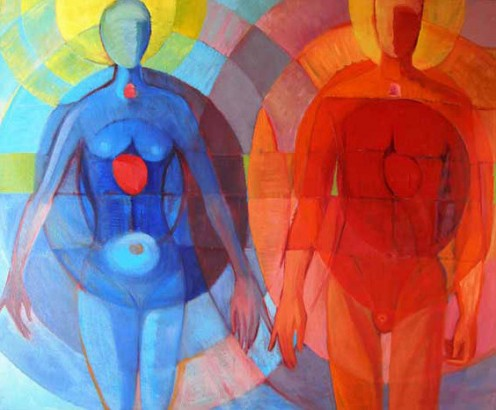
Adam and Eve, 2008

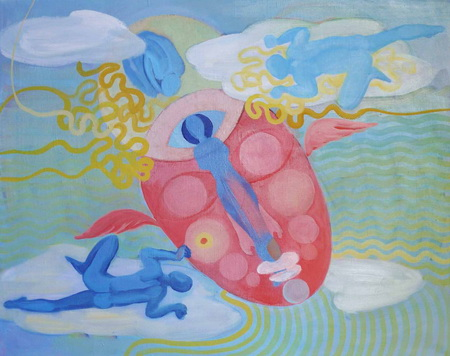
With Wings, 2011

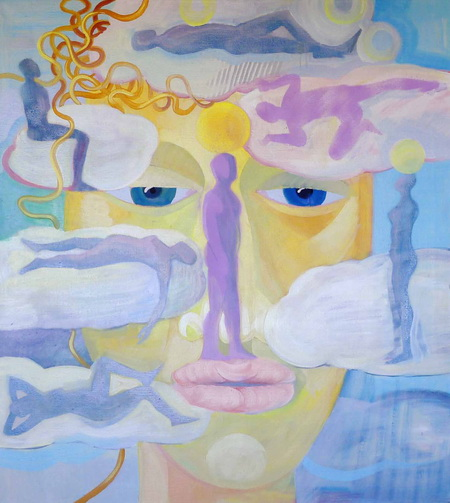
On the Highest Cloud in the Highest Heaven, 2011

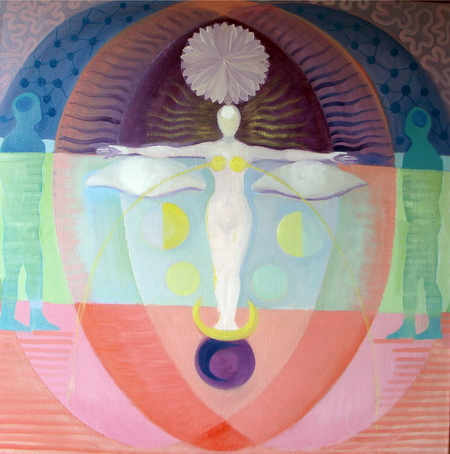
Symmetric, 2011

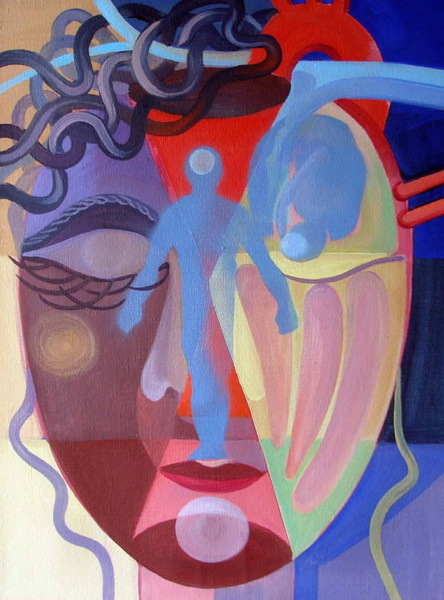
Three in One, 2011

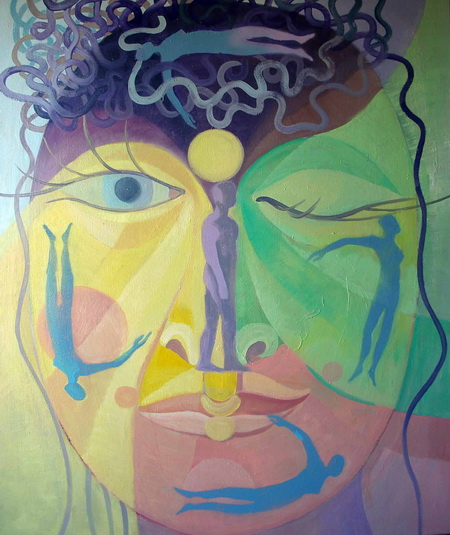
In the Circle, 2011

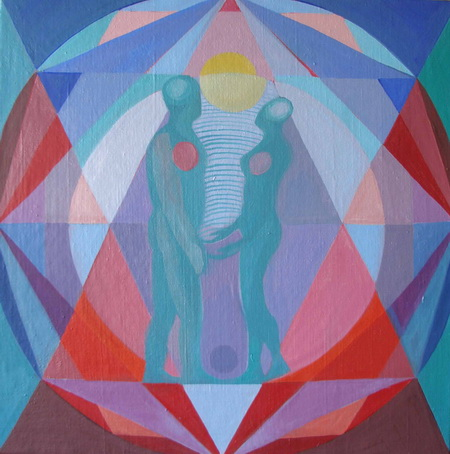
In the Set of Possibilities, 2011

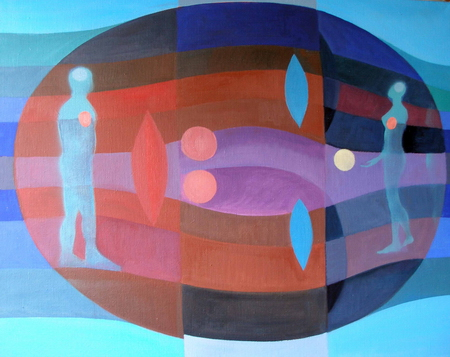
Eternal (suan), 2011

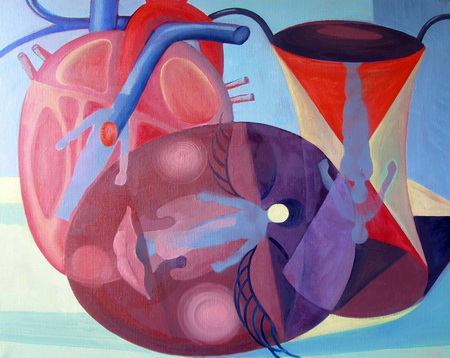
Still Life, 2011

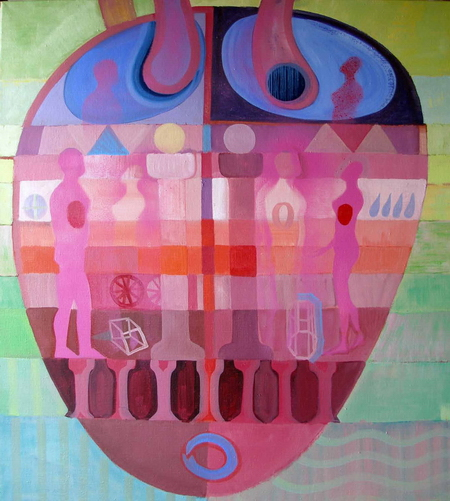
Heart, 2011

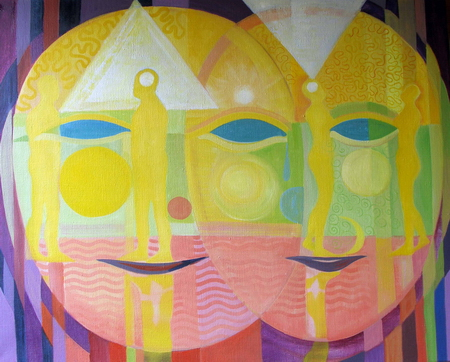
A Couple, 2011

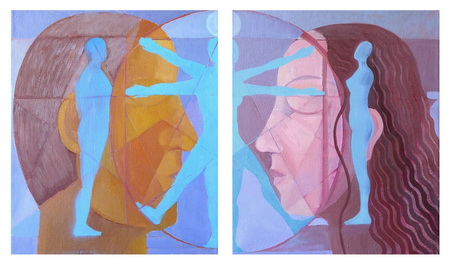
Genesis of Integrity, 2011

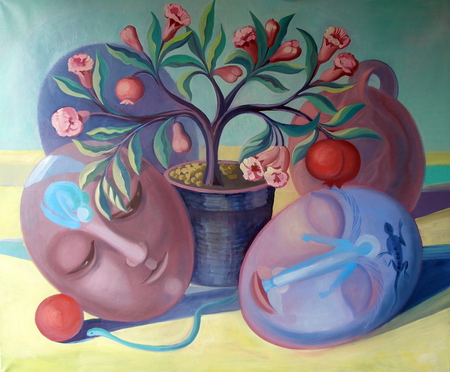
Adam and Eve, 2012

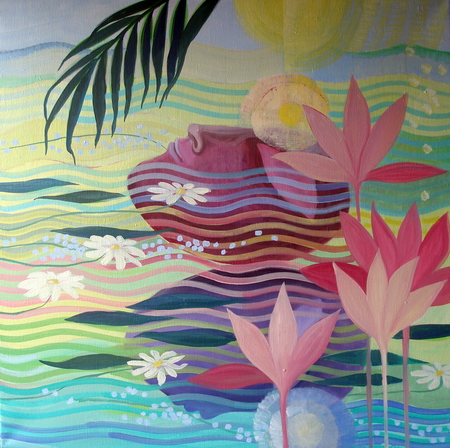
Ophelia, 2012

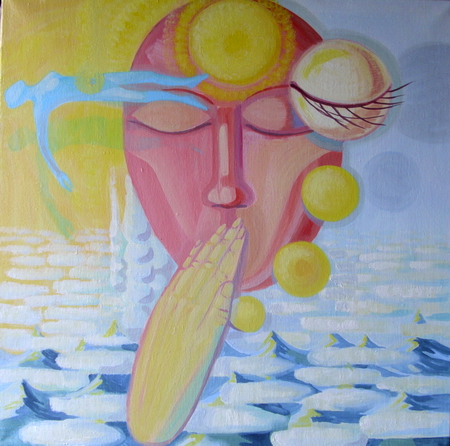
Silencio, 2012

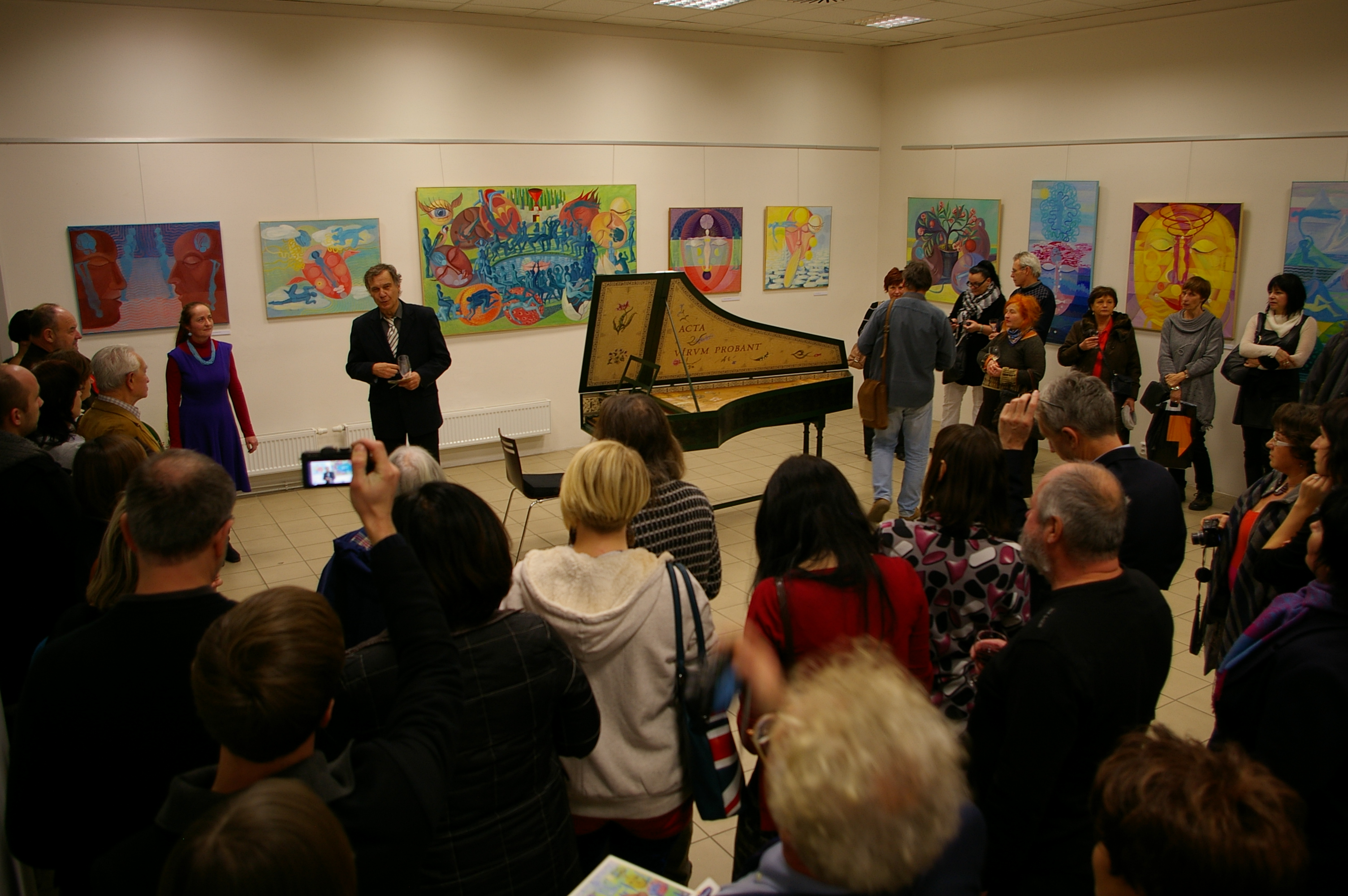
Exhibition 366 Days, 2012

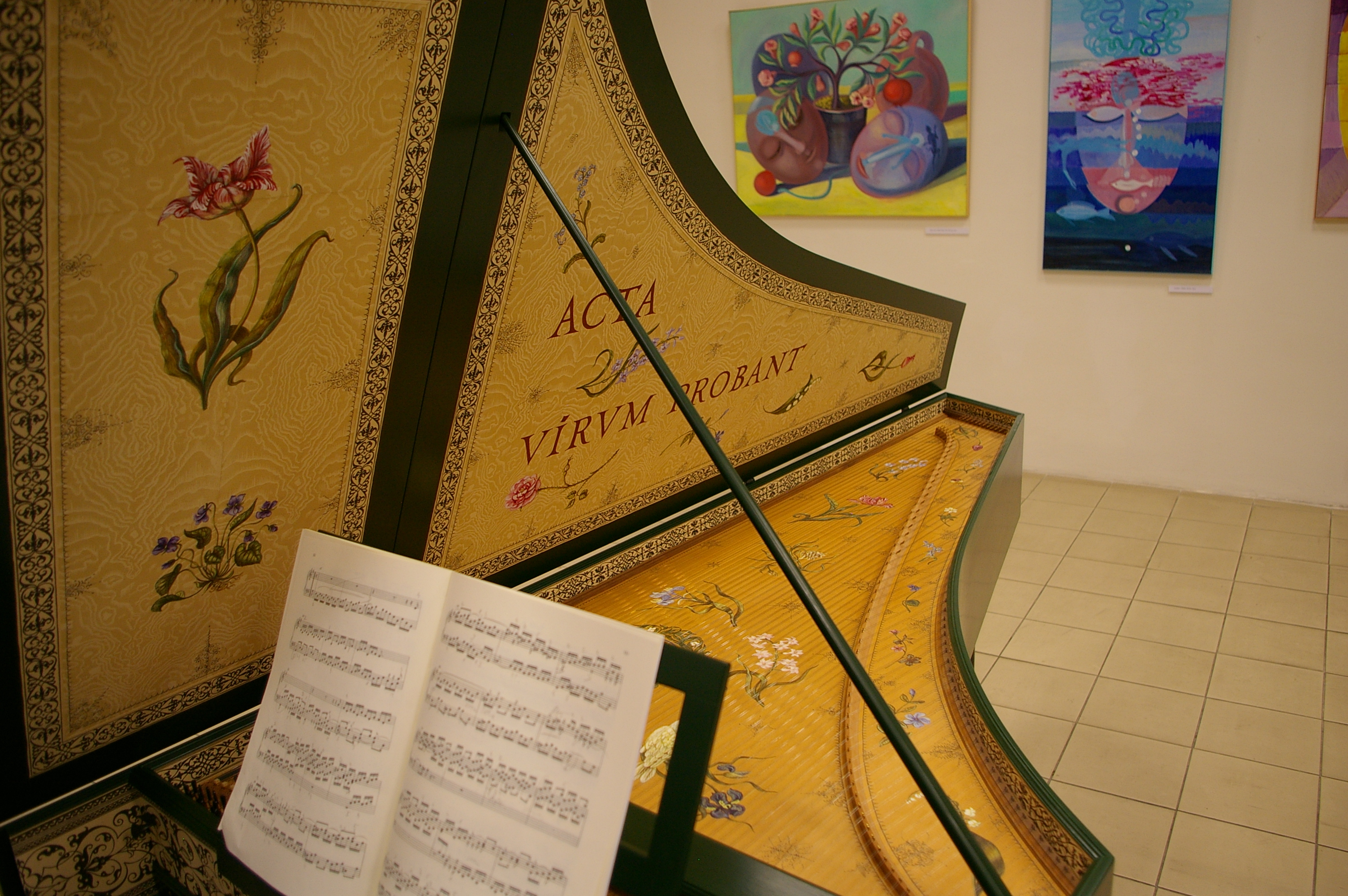
Harpsichord, decoration, 366 Days, 2012

== Links ==
=== References ===
- Text author: PhDr. Lucie Holá.
- Noční Mikrofórum ČRo 2 - Praha (Dvojka)

=== External links ===
- Miluše Poupětová on abART.cz
- VOŠUP SUPŠ - Industrial Art College and Secondary School - Official Website
