= Martin Doležal (footballer, born 1990) =

Czech footballer

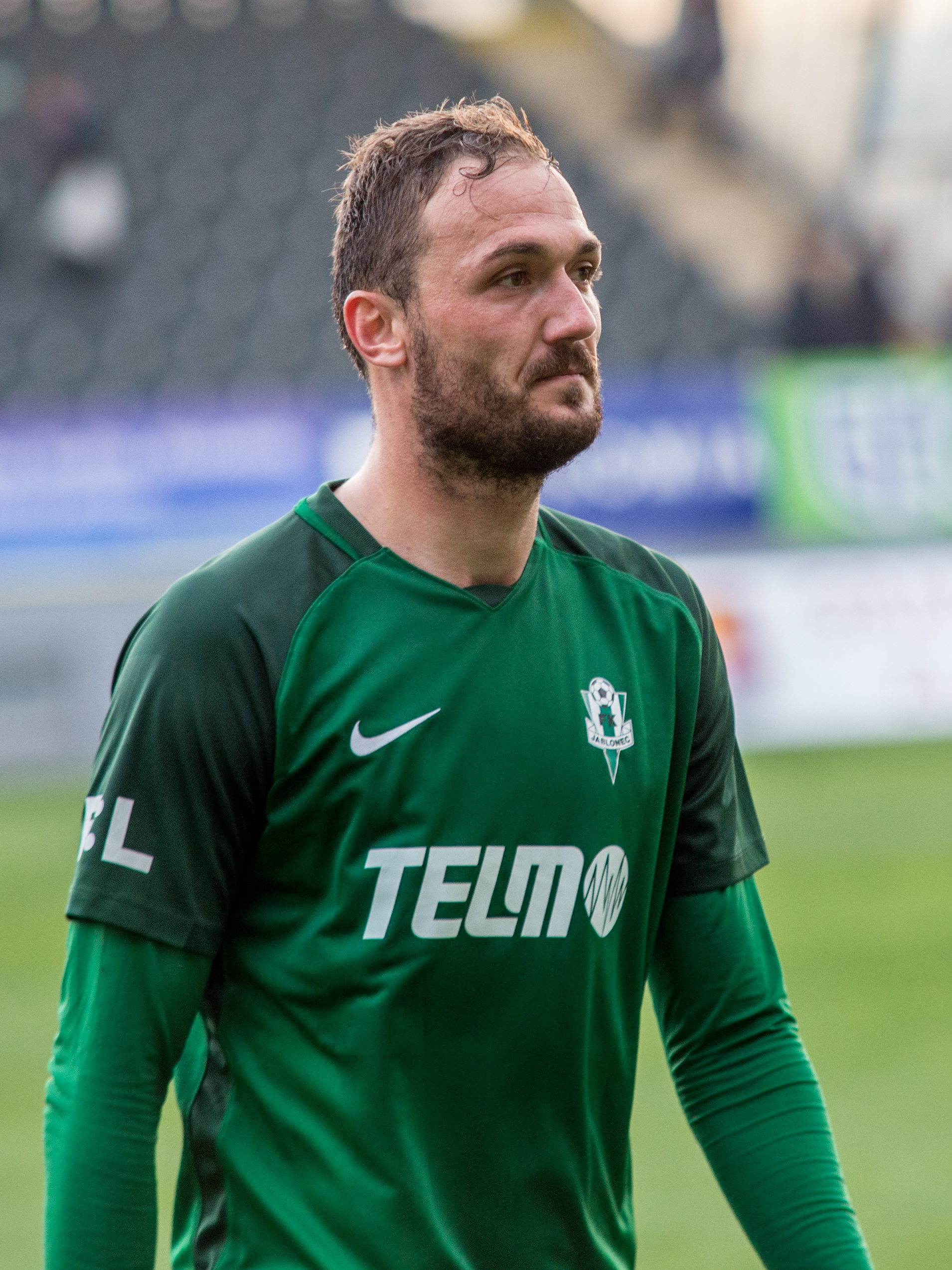

Personal information
- Date of birth: 3 May 1990 (age 36)
- Place of birth: Valašské Meziříčí, Czechoslovakia
- Height: 1.89 m (6 ft 2 1/2 in)
- Position: Forward

Youth career
- Sigma Olomouc

Senior career*
Years	Team	Apps	(Gls)
2008–2014	Sigma Olomouc	56	(17)
2009–2011	→ Fotbal Třinec (loan)	35	(2)
2011–2012	→ Zbrojovka Brno (loan)	29	(6)
2014–2022	Jablonec	226	(69)
2022–2023	Zagłębie Lubin	35	(6)
2023–2024	Karviná	24	(1)

International career
2018–2021	Czech Republic	6	(0)
- * Club domestic league appearances and goals

Martin Doležal (born 3 May 1990) is a Czech former professional footballer who played as a forward. He made over 300 appearances in the Czech First League across spells with three Czech clubs: Sigma Olomouc, Jablonec and Karviná. He also spent time in Poland, playing for Zagłębie Lubin. He made six appearances for the Czech Republic between 2018 and 2021.

== Biography ==
=== Club career ===
Doležal was the third-highest scorer in the first half of the 2013–14 Czech First League, having scored 8 goals for SK Sigma Olomouc. Upon leaving Olomouc, he had played 56 times in the Czech First League, scoring 17 goals. In January 2014, he left the club and signed a contract with Jablonec until June 2017.

In 2021, Doležal scored a hat-trick in a 4–1 Czech First League win against FK Teplice, winning applause from fans as well as head coach Petr Rada. He left Jablonec in January 2022. Across his time at Jablonec, Doležal made 225 league appearances, scoring 69 goals. While at the club, he played in the group stages of the UEFA Europa League and the UEFA Conference League.

Doležal signed a 2.5 year contract with Polish side Zagłębie Lubin in January 2022. He scored twice in his first six matches for the club. He scored 2 goals in 20 appearances in the 2022–23 Ekstraklasa before concluding his contract with Lubin by mutual consent at the end of the season.

Doležal signed a contract with Karviná in July 2023.

=== National career ===
On 15 November 2018, Doležal made his debut for the Czech Republic national team in a friendly match against Poland. He played in UEFA Euro 2020 qualifying for the Czech Republic, but missed out on the delayed UEFA Euro 2020, held in 2021, after being omitted from his nation's squad. In March 2022, Doležal was again called up to the national squad, this time for the 2022 World Cup qualification playoffs.

== Honours ==
SK Sigma Olomouc

- Czech Supercup: 2012
