= Filip Štěpánek =

Czech footballer (born 1999)

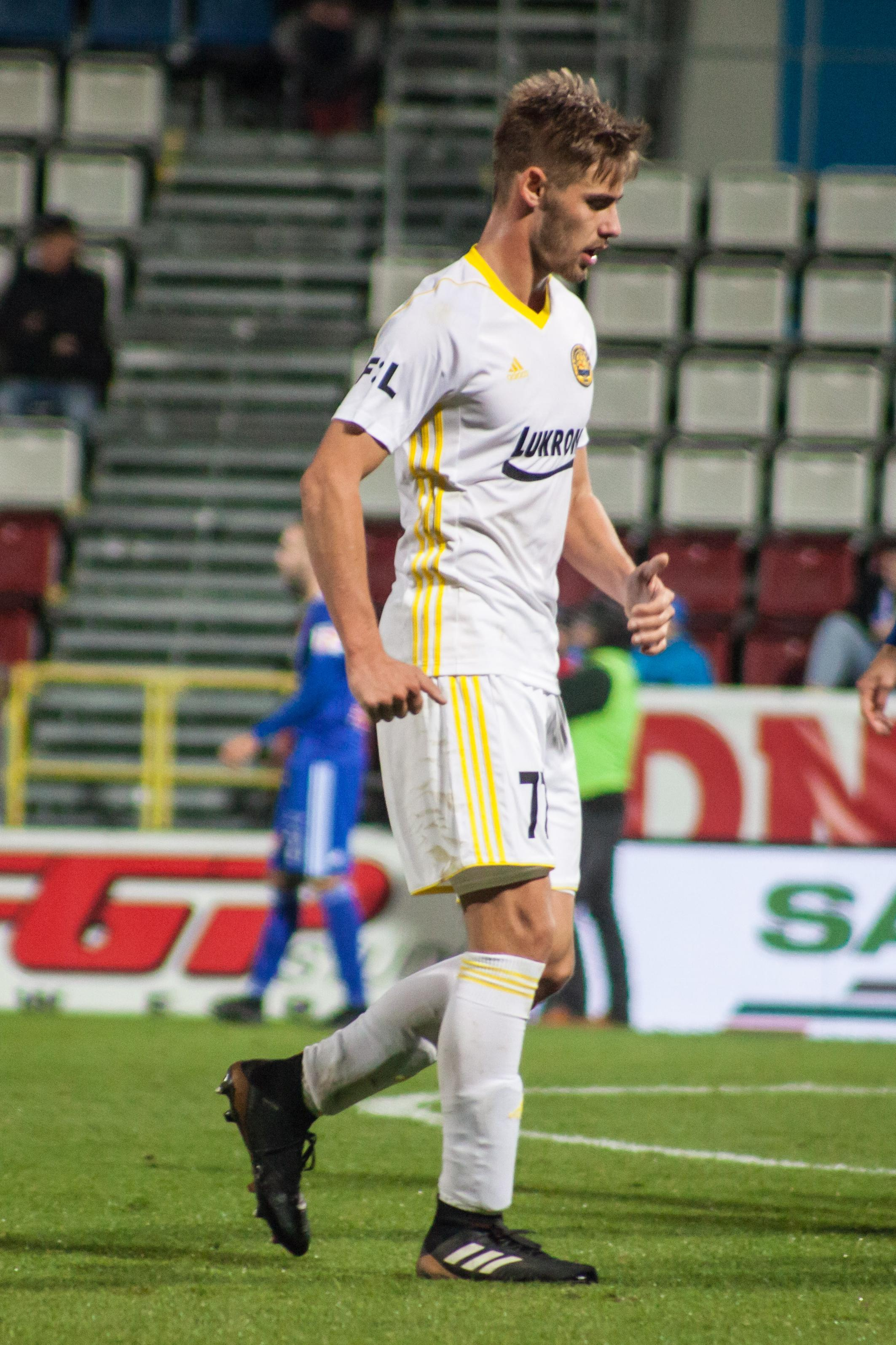

Personal information
- Date of birth: 12 January 1999 (age 27)
- Place of birth: Zlín, Czech Republic
- Height: 1.83 m (6 ft 0 in)
- Positions: Centre-back; defensive midfielder

Team information
- Current team: SFC Opava
- Number: 8

Youth career
- 2005–2009: TJ Sokol Němčice
- 2009–2015: Zlín

Senior career*
Years	Team	Apps	(Gls)
2015–2021	Zlín B	11	(1)
2021	→ Kroměříž (loan)	5	(0)
2021–2024	Vyškov	84	(4)
2024–2025	Zbrojovka Brno	14	(0)
2025	Zbrojovka Brno B	10	(0)
2026–	SFC Opava	11	(2)
- * Club domestic league appearances and goals as of 28 May 2026

Filip Štěpánek (born 12 January 1999) is a Czech professional footballer who plays as a centre-back and occasionally defensive midfielder for SFC Opava in the Czech National Football League.

== Career ==
=== Vyškov ===
Štěpánek was born in Zlín, Czech Republic. He spent multiple seasons at MFK Vyškov, where he established himself as a key figure in the defence and served as team captain.

He was praised for his leadership and defensive discipline, especially during the 2023–24 second-tier season.

=== Zbrojovka Brno ===
On 20 June 2024, Štěpánek completed a transfer from MFK Vyškov to FC Zbrojovka Brno, describing the move as a step forward in his career. He officially joined Brno on 1 July 2024 and was assigned squad number 44.
