= Foster Gyamfi =

Ghanaian footballer (born 2004)

Personal information
- Full name: Foster Gyamfi
- Date of birth: 28 January 2004 (age 22)
- Place of birth: Abesim, Ghana
- Height: 1.88 m (6 ft 2 in)
- Positions: Centre-back; left-back

Team information
- Current team: Mariehamn
- Number: 53

Youth career
- −2022: Vision
- 2022−2024: Esbjerg

Senior career*
Years	Team	Apps	(Gls)
2024–2025	Zbrojovka Brno	13	(0)
2025	Vision	0	(0)
2025–2026	Bechem United	16	(0)
2026–	Mariehamn	8	(0)
- * Club domestic league appearances and goals as of 13 November 2026

Foster Gyamfi (born 28 January 2004) is a Ghanaian professional footballer who plays as a defender for Veikkausliiga club Mariehamn.

== Career ==
=== Early career ===
He comes from Ghana, where he grew up playing football at the Vision In Motion Sporting Club academy.

=== Esbjerg ===
In August 2022, he signed a two-year contract with the Danish club Esbjerg. There he competed in the U-19 youth categories and in the Future Cup junior competition.

=== Zbrojovka Brno ===
In November 2023, he came to Zbrojovka Brno for a test. He played his first match for the A-team on 1 December 2023 in a friendly match in Chrudim, where Zbrojovka scored a massive 9–0 win. After a successful trial, he came on loan until the end of the season with an option to transfer.

=== Mariehamn ===
On 14 July 2026, Gyamfi signed a contract with Veikkausliiga club Mariehamn until 2028.
