= Vlašim =

- Town
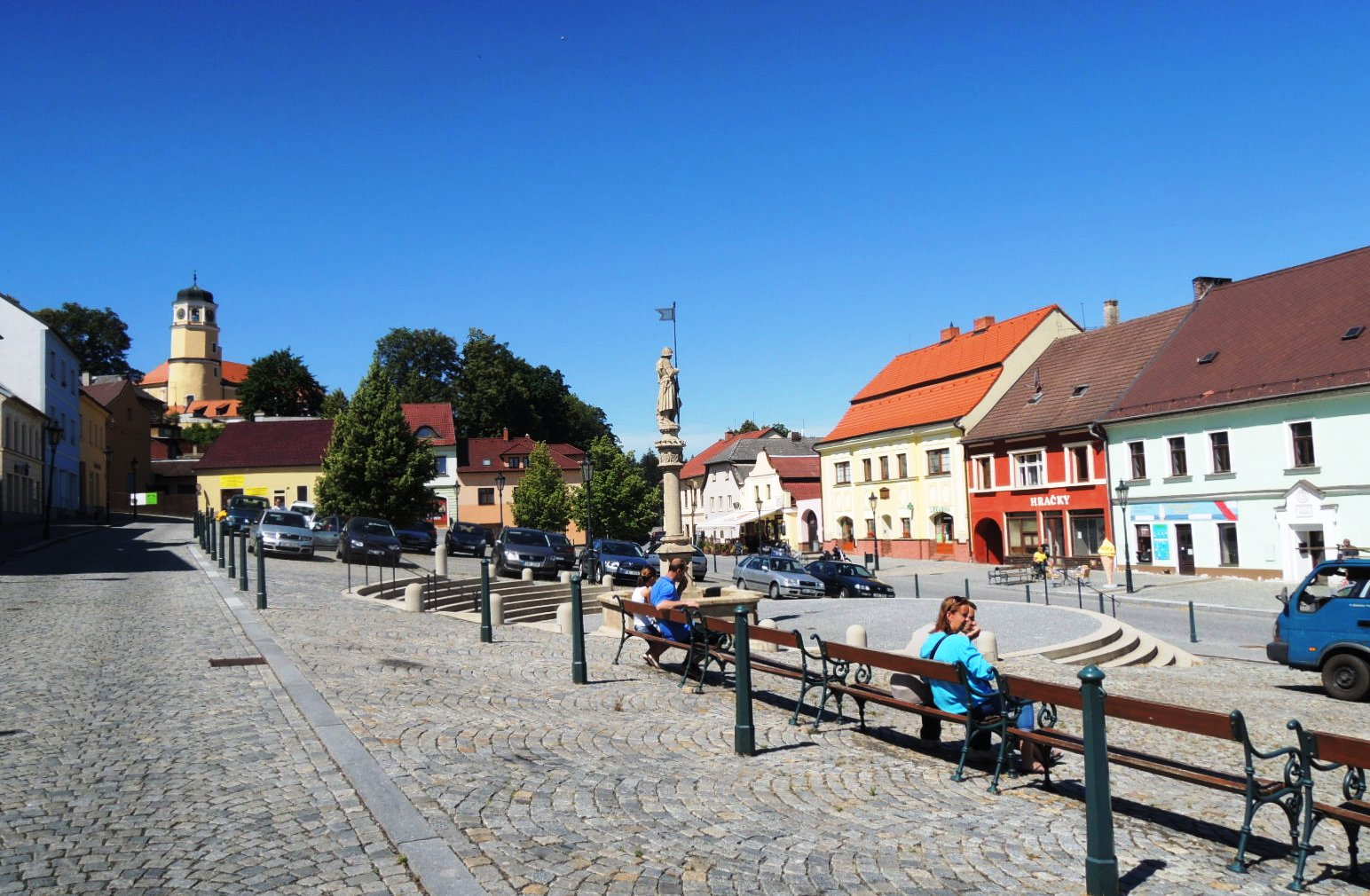
- The square Žižkovo náměstí

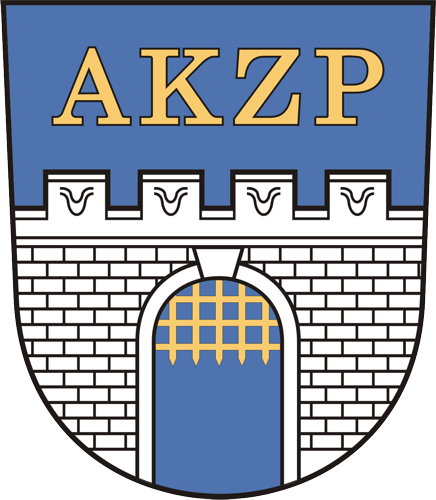
- Flag Coat of arms

- Location in the Czech Republic
- Coordinates: 49°42′23″N 14°53′56″E
- Country: Czech Republic
- Region: Central Bohemian
- District: Benešov
- First mentioned: 1318

Government
  - Mayor: Luděk Jeništa

Area
  - Total: 41.42 km^{2} (15.99 sq mi)
- Elevation: 365 m (1,198 ft)

Population (2026-01-01)
  - Total: 11,329
  - Density: 273.5/km^{2} (708.4/sq mi)
- Time zone: UTC+1 (CET)
  - Summer (DST): UTC+2 (CEST)
- Postal code: 258 01
- Website: www.mesto-vlasim.cz

Vlašim (Czech pronunciation: [ˈvlaʃɪm]; German: Wlaschim) is a town in Benešov District in the Central Bohemian Region of the Czech Republic. It has about 11,000 inhabitants. The town is located on the Blanice River in the Vlašim Uplands.

Vlašim is home to the company Sellier & Bellot, a manufacturer of ammunition. The town is known for the Vlašim Castle and its English park.

== Administrative division ==
Vlašim consists of seven municipal parts (in brackets population according to the 2021 census):

- Vlašim (9,990)
- Bolina (408)
- Domašín (618)
- Hrazená Lhota (57)
- Nesperská Lhota (80)
- Polánka (28)
- Znosim (103)

== Etymology ==
The name is derived from the personal name Vlašim, meaning "Vlašim's (property)".

== Geography ==
Vlašim is located about 17 kilometres (11 mi) southeast of Benešov and 45 km (28 mi) southeast of Prague. It lies in the Vlašim Uplands. The highest point is at 528 m (1,732 ft) above sea level. The Blanice River flows through the town.

=== Climate ===
Vlašim's climate is classified as humid continental climate (Köppen: Cfb; Trewartha: Dobk). Among them, the annual average temperature is 9.6 °C (49.3 °F), the hottest month in August is 19.4 °C (66.9 °F), and the coldest month is 0.0 °C (32.0 °F) in January. The annual precipitation is 545.8 millimetres (21.49 in), of which May is the wettest with 76.5 millimetres (3.01 in), while February is the driest with only 25.5 millimetres (1.00 in). The extreme temperature throughout the year ranged from −35.0 °C (−31.0 °F) on 10 February 1956 to 39.1 °C (102.4 °F) on 13 August 1935.

Climate data for Vlašim, 1991–2020 normals, extremes 1935–present
| Month | Jan | Feb | Mar | Apr | May | Jun | Jul | Aug | Sep | Oct | Nov | Dec | Year |
|---|---|---|---|---|---|---|---|---|---|---|---|---|---|
| Record high °C (°F) | 16.0 (60.8) | 18.1 (64.6) | 23.6 (74.5) | 30.0 (86.0) | 31.5 (88.7) | 36.8 (98.2) | 37.3 (99.1) | 39.1 (102.4) | 36.2 (97.2) | 28.3 (82.9) | 18.5 (65.3) | 17.2 (63.0) | 39.1 (102.4) |
| Mean daily maximum °C (°F) | 2.9 (37.2) | 5.6 (42.1) | 9.8 (49.6) | 15.6 (60.1) | 18.7 (65.7) | 23.7 (74.7) | 26.5 (79.7) | 26.3 (79.3) | 20.4 (68.7) | 14.0 (57.2) | 8.1 (46.6) | 4.7 (40.5) | 14.7 (58.5) |
| Daily mean °C (°F) | 0.0 (32.0) | 1.7 (35.1) | 4.6 (40.3) | 9.1 (48.4) | 12.7 (54.9) | 17.3 (63.1) | 19.2 (66.6) | 19.4 (66.9) | 14.2 (57.6) | 9.3 (48.7) | 4.9 (40.8) | 2.2 (36.0) | 9.6 (49.3) |
| Mean daily minimum °C (°F) | −2.9 (26.8) | −1.9 (28.6) | 0.2 (32.4) | 3.1 (37.6) | 6.7 (44.1) | 11.1 (52.0) | 12.5 (54.5) | 12.9 (55.2) | 9.1 (48.4) | 5.4 (41.7) | 1.9 (35.4) | −0.4 (31.3) | 4.8 (40.6) |
| Record low °C (°F) | −31.8 (−25.2) | −35.0 (−31.0) | −22.0 (−7.6) | −7.2 (19.0) | −3.6 (25.5) | 1.2 (34.2) | 2.4 (36.3) | 1.1 (34.0) | −4.5 (23.9) | −13.0 (8.6) | −21.1 (−6.0) | −24.6 (−12.3) | −35.0 (−31.0) |
| Average precipitation mm (inches) | 30.7 (1.21) | 25.5 (1.00) | 35.8 (1.41) | 32.0 (1.26) | 76.5 (3.01) | 57.6 (2.27) | 61.1 (2.41) | 61.8 (2.43) | 48.7 (1.92) | 54.7 (2.15) | 31.5 (1.24) | 29.8 (1.17) | 545.8 (21.49) |
| Average relative humidity (%) | 84.4 | 78.2 | 74.5 | 69.0 | 73.3 | 71.2 | 65.6 | 67.1 | 75.8 | 84.2 | 87.0 | 84.7 | 76.3 |
| Mean monthly sunshine hours | 56.5 | 88.2 | 135.7 | 203.5 | 205.0 | 232.2 | 238.6 | 229.0 | 169.6 | 101.8 | 61.9 | 50.2 | 1,772.2 |
Source: Czech Hydrometeorological Institute

== History ==
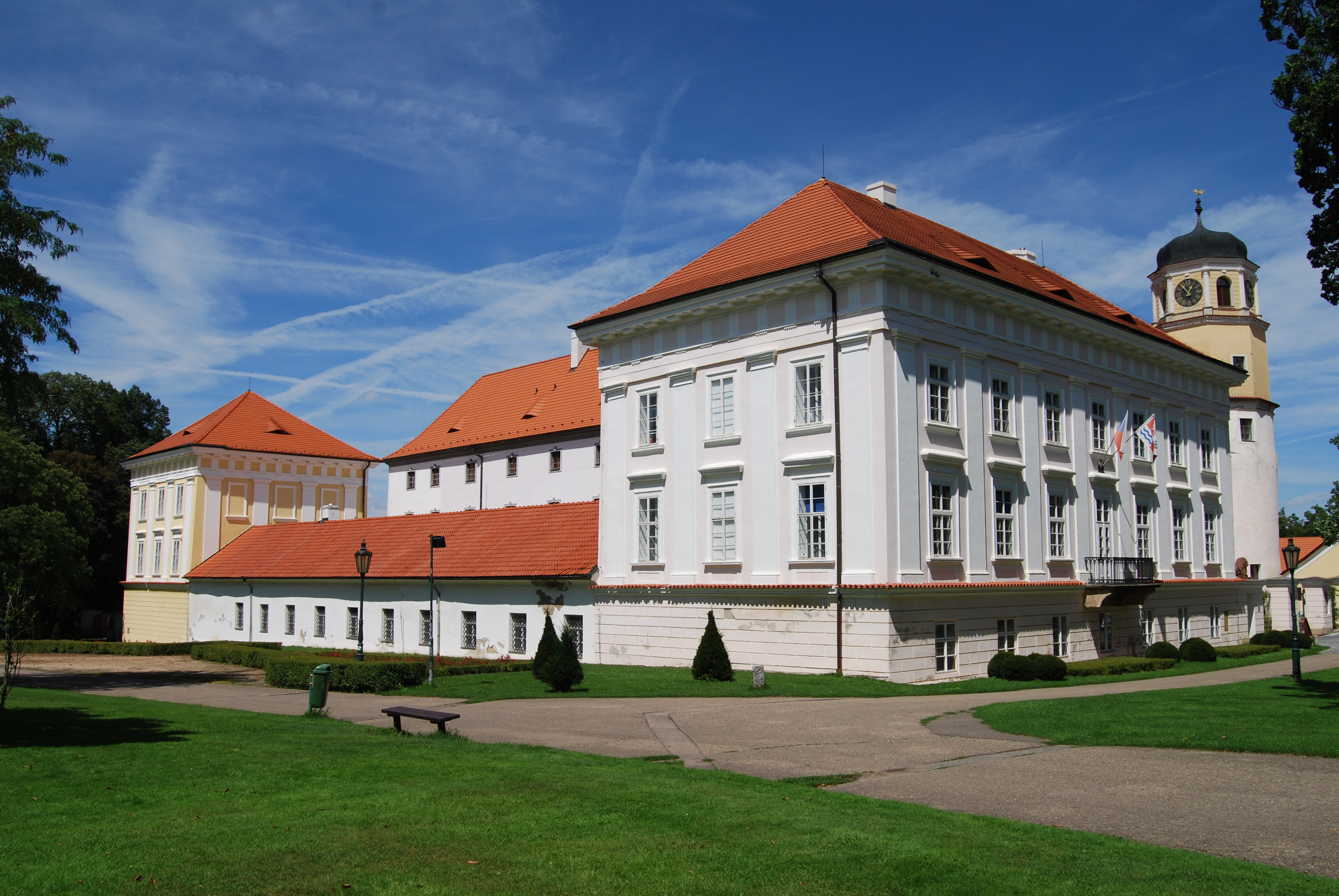
Vlašim Castle

The castle is Vlašim was probably built in 1303 by local noble family, which started calling itself the Vlašim family. The first written mention of the castle and therefore of Vlašim is from 1318. After the Vlašim family, the town was owned by the Trčka of Lípa family and then by the Ostrovec family. As a result of the Battle of White Mountain in 1620, the properties of the Ostrovec family were confiscated and Vlašim was acquired by the Talmberk family in 1622. They owned the town until 1744. From 1744 until the end of World War II, the Vlašim estate was owned by the Auersperg family.

== Demographics ==
Historical population

| Year | Pop. | ±% |
|---|---|---|
| 1869 | 4,040 | — |
| 1880 | 4,547 | +12.5% |
| 1890 | 4,791 | +5.4% |
| 1900 | 4,936 | +3.0% |
| 1910 | 5,115 | +3.6% |

| Year | Pop. | ±% |
|---|---|---|
| 1921 | 5,075 | −0.8% |
| 1930 | 5,464 | +7.7% |
| 1950 | 7,444 | +36.2% |
| 1961 | 8,747 | +17.5% |
| 1970 | 10,515 | +20.2% |

| Year | Pop. | ±% |
|---|---|---|
| 1980 | 12,613 | +20.0% |
| 1991 | 12,809 | +1.6% |
| 2001 | 12,270 | −4.2% |
| 2011 | 11,723 | −4.5% |
| 2021 | 11,284 | −3.7% |

Source: Censuses

== Economy ==
The most significant industrial company in Vlašim is Sellier & Bellot, a manufacturer of ammunition. It employs more than 1,500 people.

== Transport ==
There are no major roads passing through the town.

Vlašim is located on the Benešov–Trhový Štěpánov railway line.

In the northern part of the territory of Vlašim is a small airport, available for national public traffic.

== Culture ==
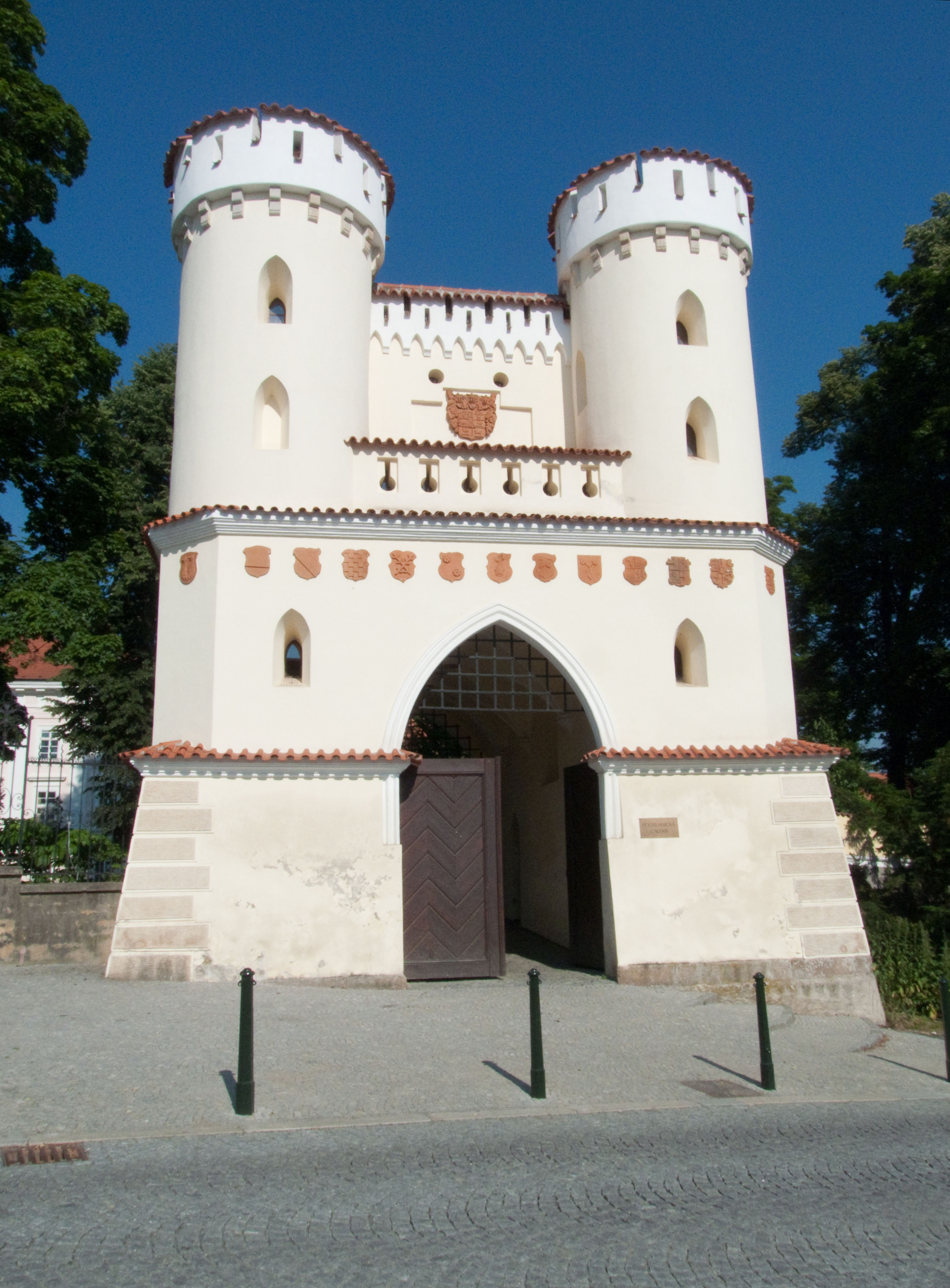
Vlašim castle gate

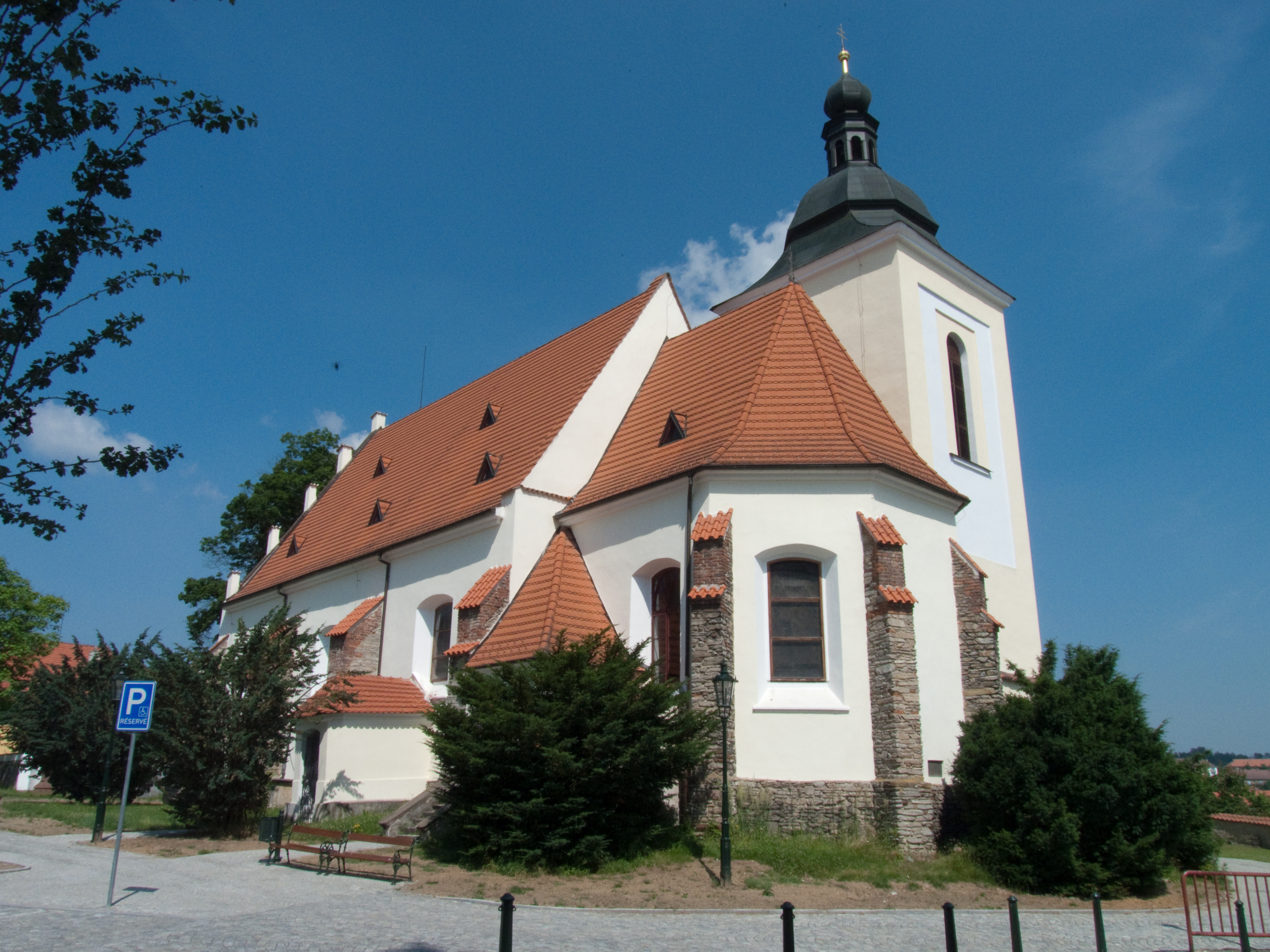
Church of Saint Giles

The castle park hosts an annual festival on 1 May, which is a public holiday in the Czech Republic.

== Sport ==
The town is home to FC Sellier & Bellot Vlašim, an association football team that plays in the Czech National Football League, the second tier of Czech football.

== Sights ==
The main landmark of the town is the Vlašim Castle. The original Gothic castle was rebuilt in the Renaissance style in the 16th century. It is surrounded by a large English landscape garden with many pieces of romantic architecture such as the Chinese pavilion, Old Castle and its three gates.

The Church of Saint Giles is a late Gothic building, built in 1522–1523.

== Notable people ==
- Jan Očko of Vlašim (?–1380), Archbishop of Prague
- Miluše Poupětová (born 1963), artist
- Marcela Krinke-Susmelj (1965–2024), Czech-Swiss dressage rider
- Luboš Kozel (born 1971), football player and manager
- Libor Procházka (born 1974), ice hockey player
- Stanislav Vlček (born 1976), footballer
- Michal Rozsíval (born 1978), ice hockey player
- Michal Řepík (born 1988), ice hockey player
- Kristýna Kaltounková (born 2002), ice hockey player

== See also ==
- Votive Panel of Jan Očko of Vlašim
