= Patrik Haitl =

Czech footballer (born 1998)

Personal information
- Date of birth: 1 March 1998 (age 28)
- Place of birth: Prague, Czech Republic
- Height: 1.72 m (5 ft 8 in)
- Position: Left-back

Team information
- Current team: Arsenal Česká Lípa
- Number: 7

Youth career
- 2004–2008: Jílové u Prahy
- 2009-2010: Slavia Prague
- 2010–2014: Jílové u Prahy
- 2014–2016: Jablonec

Senior career*
Years	Team	Apps	(Gls)
2016–2022	Jablonec	12	(0)
2016–2022	Jablonec B	36	(0)
2018	→ Benešov (loan)	14	(0)
2022–2024	Opava	48	(2)
2025–2026	Zbrojovka Brno	1	(0)
2025–2026	Zbrojovka Brno B	4	(3)
2026–	Arsenal Česká Lípa	11	(0)
- * Club domestic league appearances and goals as of 24 January 2025

Patrik Haitl (born 1 March 1998) is a Czech professional footballer who currently plays as a left-back for Arsenal Česká Lípa. He considers Tomáš Hübschman to be his role model.

On 9 February 2026, Haitl signed a contract with Bohemian Football League club Arsenal Česká Lípa.
