= Martin Nový =

Czech footballer (born 1993)

Personal information
- Date of birth: 23 June 1993 (age 33)
- Place of birth: Prague, Czech Republic
- Height: 1.78 m (5 ft 10 in)
- Position: Right-back

Youth career
- –2014: Sparta Prague

Senior career*
Years	Team	Apps	(Gls)
2014–2018	Sparta Prague B	1	(0)
2014–2016	→ Vlašim (loan)	49	(7)
2016–2017	→ Jablonec (loan)	9	(0)
2017–2018	→ Jihlava (loan)	21	(0)
2018–2021	Příbram	79	(4)
2021–2024	Bohemians 1905	26	(0)
2023–2024	→ Zbrojovka Brno (loan)	15	(0)
2024–2025	Zbrojovka Brno	23	(1)
2025–2026	Viktoria Žižkov	32	(2)
- * Club domestic league appearances and goals as of 15 September 2026

Martin Nový (born 23 June 1993) is a Czech former professional footballer who played as a centre back.
