= William Mackleyther =

Colombian footballer

Personal information
- Full name: William Mackleyther Palacios Vera
- Date of birth: 26 December 2000 (age 25)
- Place of birth: Nuquí, Colombia
- Height: 1.78 m (5 ft 10 in)
- Position: Midfielder

Team information
- Current team: Znojmo
- Number: 9

Youth career
- –2018: Boca Juniors de Cali
- 2018–2019: Dukla Prague

Senior career*
Years	Team	Apps	(Gls)
2019–2021	Dukla Prague	18	(3)
2021–2022	Feirense	1	(0)
2023	Deportes Quindío	15	(0)
2024	Inter Palmira	5	(0)
2025–2026	Zbrojovka Brno	12	(1)
2025	Zbrojovka Brno B	3	(1)
2025	→ Kroměříž (loan)	5	(0)
2026–	Znojmo	15	(13)
- * Club domestic league appearances and goals as of 17 July 2026

William Mackleyther Palacios Vera (born 26 December 2000) is a Colombian footballer playing as a midfielder for Czech club Znojmo.

== Club career ==
=== Zbrojovka Brno ===
In January 2025, he signed a contract in Zbrojovka Brno, where he had already been on trial since November. After joining Zbrojovka Brno, he decided to use his middle name Mackleyther.

=== Znojmo ===
On 7 February 2026, Mackleyther signed a contract with Czech Fourth Division club Znojmo.

== Career statistics ==
=== Club ===
As of 18 July 2020.

Club	Season	League			Cup		Other		Total	
Club	Season	Division	Apps	Goals	Apps	Goals	Apps	Goals	Apps	Goals
Dukla Prague	2018–19	Czech First League	1	0	0	0	0	0	1	0
Dukla Prague	2019–20	Czech National Football League	1	0	0	0	0	0	1	0
Career total			2	0	0	0	0	0	2	0
