= 2022–23 FC Hradec Králové season =

FC Hradec Králové
2022–23 season
- Chairman: Richard Jukl
- Manager: Miroslav Koubek
- Stadium: Lokotrans Aréna (Note: Hradec Králové played their home matches in Mladá Boleslav due to the rebuilding of their own Všesportovní stadion, which would finish in June 2023.) (Temporary stadium)
- Czech First League: 5th
- Czech Cup: Fourth round
- Top goalscorer: League: Filip Kubala (6); All: Filip Kubala (8)

The 2022–23 season is the 118th in the history of FC Hradec Králové and their second consecutive season in the top flight. The club will participate in the Czech First League and the Czech Cup.

== Players ==
As of 8 September 2022.

Note: Flags indicate national team as defined under FIFA eligibility rules; some limited exceptions apply. Players may hold more than one non-FIFA nationality.

No.	Pos.	Nation	Player
1	GK	CZE	Patrik Vízek
2	MF	CZE	Vojtěch Smrž
3	MF	CZE	Jakub Kučera
4	DF	CZE	Otto Urma
5	DF	CZE	Filip Čihák (on loan from Viktoria Plzeň)
6	MF	CZE	Lukáš Hájek
7	FW	CZE	Petr Rybička
9	FW	CZE	Filip Kubala
10	FW	SVK	Matej Trusa (on loan from Viktoria Plzeň)
12	GK	CZE	Michal Reichl
13	DF	CZE	Adam Gabriel
14	DF	CZE	Jakub Klíma
15	FW	CZE	Daniel Vašulín
16	MF	CZE	Filip Novotný

No.	Pos.	Nation	Player
17	FW	CZE	Pavel Dvořák
18	DF	CZE	Michal Leibl
19	DF	CZE	Ondřej Ševčík
20	GK	SVK	Pavol Bajza
21	DF	CZE	Štěpán Harazim
22	MF	CZE	Petr Kodeš
23	MF	CZE	Jakub Rada
24	MF	CZE	Matěj Ryneš (on loan from Sparta Prague)
25	DF	CZE	František Čech
26	DF	CZE	Daniel Kutík
27	FW	CZE	David Jurčenko
28	MF	CZE	David Doležal
29	FW	CZE	Matěj Koubek

=== Out on loan ===
Note: Flags indicate national team as defined under FIFA eligibility rules; some limited exceptions apply. Players may hold more than one non-FIFA nationality.

No.	Pos.	Nation	Player
—	GK	CZE	Ondřej Mach (at Chrudim)
—	MF	CZE	Marek Kejř (at Chrudim)
—	MF	CZE	Jan Záviška (at Chrudim)

No.	Pos.	Nation	Player
—	FW	CZE	Filip Firbacher (at Chrudim)
—	MF	CZE	Jiří Kateřiňák (at Fotbal Třinec)
—	MF	CZE	Denny Samko (at Varnsdorf)

== Pre-season and friendlies ==
Win Draw Loss Fixtures

== Competitions ==
=== Overall record ===
Competition	First match	Last match	Starting round	Record							
Competition	First match	Last match	Starting round	Pld	W	D	L	GF	GA	GD	Win %
Czech First League	30 July 2022	May 2023	Matchday 1	16	7	2	7	19	19	+0	43.75
Czech Cup	21 September 2022		Second round	2	2	0	0	15	0	+15	100.00
Total				18	9	2	7	34	19	+15	50.00

Last updated: 13 November 2022
Source: Soccerway

=== Czech First League ===
==== Results summary ====
Overall								Home						Away					
Pld	W	D	L	GF	GA	GD	Pts	W	D	L	GF	GA	GD	W	D	L	GF	GA	GD
30	11	5	14	34	40	−6	38	5	2	8	15	21	−6	6	3	6	19	19	0

Source: Fortuna Liga

==== Regular season ====
===== League table =====
Pos	Team	Pld	W	D	L	GF	GA	GD	Pts	Qualification or relegation
6	Sigma Olomouc	30	10	11	9	45	40	+5	41	Qualification for the championship group
7	Slovan Liberec	30	10	8	12	39	43	−4	38	Qualification for the play-off
8	Hradec Králové	30	11	5	14	34	40	−6	38	Qualification for the play-off
9	Mladá Boleslav	30	9	10	11	39	42	−3	37	Qualification for the play-off
10	České Budějovice	30	10	5	15	35	54	−19	35	Qualification for the play-off

Source: Fortuna Liga
Rules for classification: 1) Points; 2) Head-to-head points; 3) Head-to-head goal difference; 4) Head-to-head goals scored; 5) Goal difference; 6) Goals scored; 7) Fair-play ranking; 8) Draw.

===== Results by round =====
Round	1	2	3	4	5	6	7	8	9	10	11	12	13	14	15	16	17	18	19	20	21	22	23	24	25	26	27	28	29	30
Ground	H	A	H	A	H	A	H	A	H	A	H	H	A	H	A	H	A	H	A	H	A	H	A	H	A	A	H	A	H	A
Result	W	L	L	W	W	W	D	L	D	L	W	W	W	L	L	L	W	L	D	L	W	L	D	L	L	W	W	L	L	D
Position	5	10	11	8	5	3	3	5	6	6	5	4	4	4	4	5	4	6	7	7	5	7	7	7	9	7	7	7	8	8

Source: Fortuna Liga
A = Away; H = Home; W = Win; D = Draw; L = Loss

===== Matches =====
The league fixtures were announced on 22 June 2022.

31 July 2022 1	Hradec Králové	1–0	Slavia Prague	Mladá Boleslav
16:00 CEST (UTC+2)	Kučera (yellow card) 36'; Vašulín 54'; Reichl (yellow card) 90+1'	Report	Douděra (yellow card) 45+2'	Stadium: Lokotrans Aréna; Attendance: 5,000; Referee: Miroslav Zelinka

7 August 2022 2	Slovácko	1–0	Hradec Králové	Uherské Hradiště
16:00 CEST (UTC+2)	Daníček 58'	Report		Stadium: Městský fotbalový stadion Miroslava Valenty; Attendance: 4,202; Referee: Ondřej Berka

13 August 2022 3	Hradec Králové	1–2	Viktoria Plzeň	Mladá Boleslav
19:00 CEST (UTC+2)	Kubala 44'	Report	Chorý 39'; Pilař 84'	Stadium: Lokotrans Aréna; Attendance: 1,900; Referee: Tomáš Klíma

22 August 2022 4	Bohemians 1905	1–2	Hradec Králové	Prague
19:00 CEST (UTC+2)	Puškáč 37' (pen.)	Report	Kubala 23'; Vlkanova 30'	Stadium: Ďolíček; Attendance: 4,321; Referee: Miroslav Zelinka

28 August 2022 5	Hradec Králové	1–0	Sigma Olomouc	Mladá Boleslav
16:00 CEST (UTC+2)	Kodeš 53'	Report		Stadium: Lokotrans Aréna; Attendance: 1,051; Referee: Zbyněk Proske

31 August 2022 6	Mladá Boleslav	1–2	Hradec Králové	Mladá Boleslav
17:30 CEST (UTC+2)	Škoda 55' (pen.)	Report	Vašulín 41'; Smrž 72'	Stadium: Lokotrans Aréna; Attendance: 2,031; Referee: Lukáš Nehasil

4 September 2022 7	Hradec Králové	0–0	Baník Ostrava	Mladá Boleslav
16:00 CEST (UTC+2)		Report		Stadium: Lokotrans Aréna; Attendance: 2,022; Referee: Marek Radina

11 September 2022 8	Jablonec	3–0	Hradec Králové	Jablonec nad Nisou
16:00 CEST (UTC+2)	Sejk (yellow card) 50'; Martinec (yellow card) 68'; Chramosta (yellow card) 80'; Houska (yellow card) 90+1'	Report	Rada (yellow card) 57'	Stadium: Stadion Střelnice; Attendance: 2,309; Referee: Tomáš Batík

18 September 2022 9	Hradec Králové	0–0	Trinity Zlín	Mladá Boleslav
16:00 CEST (UTC+2)		Report		Stadium: Lokotrans Aréna; Attendance: 550; Referee: Dominik Starý

1 October 2022 10	Sparta Prague	2–1	Hradec Králové	Prague
19:00 CEST (UTC+2)	Sørensen 52'; Kuchta 59'	Report	Kubala 13'	Stadium: Stadion Letná; Attendance: 10,317; Referee: Lukáš Nehasil

8 October 2022 11	Hradec Králové	4–1	Teplice	Mladá Boleslav
16:00 CEST (UTC+2)	Rada 19' (pen.); Gabriel 54', 88'; Ševčík 81'	Report	Žák 42' (pen.)	Stadium: Lokotrans Aréna; Attendance: 816; Referee: Ladislav Szikszay

15 October 2022 12	Hradec Králové	2–1	Zbrojovka Brno	Mladá Boleslav
16:00 CEST (UTC+2)	Kodeš (yellow card) 22'; Rada 43'; Leibl (yellow card) 45+2'; Vašulín 88'	Report	Řezníček 29'; Souček (yellow card) after match'	Stadium: Lokotrans Aréna; Attendance: 801; Referee: Jan Petřík

23 October 2022 13	České Budějovice	0–3	Hradec Králové	České Budějovice
16:00 CEST (UTC+2)		Report	Kubala 53', 65'; Koubek 88'	Stadium: Stadion Střelecký ostrov Attendance: 3,472; Referee: Michal Křepský

29 October 2022 14	Hradec Králové	1–3	Pardubice	Mladá Boleslav
15:00 CEST (UTC+2)	Kubala 58'	Report	Janošek 50', 76'; Černý 71'	Stadium: Lokotrans Aréna; Attendance: 2,019; Referee: Ondřej Berka

6 November 2022 15	Slovan Liberec	2–0	Hradec Králové	Liberec
15:00 CET (UTC+1)	Van Buren 14'; Rabušic (yellow card) 26'; Vliegen (yellow card) 75'; Rondić 76'	Report	Vašulín (yellow card) 79'; Rada (yellow card) 90+3'; Koubek (yellow card) 90+3'	Stadium: Stadion u Nisy; Attendance: 3,125; Referee: Miroslav Zelinka

13 November 2022 16	Hradec Králové	1–2	Slovácko	Mladá Boleslav
15:00 CET (UTC+1)	Ryneš 27'	Report	Havlík 52'; Mihálik 69' (pen.)	Stadium: Lokotrans Aréna; Attendance: 965; Referee: Jan Petřík

28 January 2023 17	Viktoria Plzeň	1–2	Hradec Králové	Plzeň
15:00 CET (UTC+1)	Chorý 6'	Report	Smrž 43'; Pudhorocký 72'	Stadium: Doosan Arena; Attendance: 8,135; Referee: Jan Machálek

5 February 2023 18	Hradec Králové	0–2	Bohemians 1905	Mladá Boleslav
15:00 CET (UTC+1)		Report	Hůlka 7'; Drchal 41'	Stadium: Lokotrans Aréna; Attendance: 1,039; Referee: Dalibor Černý

12 February 2023 19	Sigma Olomouc	2–2	Hradec Králové	Olomouc
15:00 CET (UTC+1)	Ventúra 25'; Vodháněl 82'	Report	Leibl 8'; Koubek 63'	Stadium: Andrův stadion Attendance: 2,202; Referee: Jan Všetečka

18 February 2023 20	Hradec Králové	0–1	Mladá Boleslav	Mladá Boleslav
15:00 CET (UTC+1)		Report	Kušej 48'	Stadium: Lokotrans Aréna; Attendance: 1,079; Referee: Pavel Orel

26 February 2023 21	Baník Ostrava	0–2	Hradec Králové	Ostrava
18:00 CET (UTC+1)		Report	Leibl 23'; Ryneš 70'	Stadium: Městský stadion Attendance: 4,271; Referee: Dominik Starý

4 March 2023 22	Hradec Králové	1–4	Jablonec	Mladá Boleslav
15:00 CET (UTC+1)	Novotný 34'; Leibl (yellow card) 51' (yellow-red card) 90+8'; Bajza (red card) 54'; Ryneš (yellow card) 75'	Report	Chramosta 60', 81'; Šulc 65'; Polidar 86'	Stadium: Lokotrans Aréna; Attendance: 676; Referee: Miroslav Zelinka

11 March 2023 23	Trinity Zlín	2–2	Hradec Králové	Zlín
15:00 CET (UTC+1)	Chanturishvili 5'; Kozák 45+5'	Report	Koubek 39'; Vašulín 72'	Stadium: Letná Stadion; Attendance: 2,088; Referee: Ondřej Berka

18 March 2023 24	Hradec Králové	0–2	Sparta Prague	Mladá Boleslav
15:00 CET (UTC+1)		Report	Haraslín 45'; Wiesner 89'	Stadium: Lokotrans Aréna; Attendance: 5,000; Referee: Dalibor Černý

2 April 2023 25	Teplice	1–0	Hradec Králové	Teplice
16:00 CEST (UTC+2)	Hybš 22' (pen.)	Report		Stadium: Na Stínadlech; Attendance: 2,073; Referee: Miroslav Zelinka

8 April 2023 26	Zbrojovka Brno	1–2	Hradec Králové	Brno
16:00 CEST (UTC+2)	Alli 19'; Texl (yellow card) 26'; Alli (yellow card) 90'	Report	Kubala (yellow card) 26'; Vašulín 40'; Klíma (yellow card) 46'; Ryneš 50'; Harazim (yellow card) 84'; Dvořák (yellow card) 89'; Hejkal (yellow card) 90+1' (coach)	Stadium: ADAX Invest Arena; Attendance: 3,155; Referee: Jan Všetečka

16 April 2023 27	Hradec Králové	2–1	České Budějovice	Mladá Boleslav
16:00 CEST (UTC+2)	Vašulín 32'; Kučera 35'	Report	Čmelík 84'	Stadium: Lokotrans Aréna; Attendance: 690; Referee: Marek Radina

22 April 2023 28	Pardubice	1–0	Hradec Králové	Pardubice
16:00 CEST (UTC+2)	Černý 56'	Report		Stadium: CFIG Arena; Attendance: 4 450; Referee: Ladislav Szikszay

26 April 2023 29	Hradec Králové	1–2	Slovan Liberec	Mladá Boleslav
17:30 CEST (UTC+2)	Harazim (yellow card) 72'; Kodeš 81', (yellow card) 90+1'	Report	Rondić 49'; Olatunji 79' (pen.)	Stadium: Lokotrans Aréna; Attendance: 450; Referee: Petr Hocek

30 April 2023 30	Slavia Prague	1–1	Hradec Králové	Prague
15:00 CEST (UTC+2)	Gabriel 19' (o.g.); Ogbu (yellow card) 83'; Zafeiris (yellow card) 84'	Report	Kučera 8'; Ryneš (yellow card) 38'; Bajza (yellow card) 90+9'	Stadium: Fortuna Arena; Attendance: 16,737; Referee: Marek Radina

==== Play-off ====
===== First round =====
7 May 2023 First leg	Mladá Boleslav	0–0	Hradec Králové	Mladá Boleslav
15:00 CEST (UTC+2)		Report		Stadium: Lokotrans Aréna; Attendance: 1,144; Referee: Stanislav Volek

13 May 2023 Second leg	Hradec Králové	2–0 (2–0 agg.)	Mladá Boleslav	Mladá Boleslav
15:00 CEST (UTC+2)	Koubek 26'; Vašulín 28'	Report		Stadium: Lokotrans Aréna; Attendance: 1,060; Referee: Michael Kvítek
Note: Hradec Králové won 2–0 on aggregate.

===== Second round =====
21 May 2023 First leg	Hradec Králové	0–4	Slovan Liberec	Liberec
15:00 CEST (UTC+2)	Kubala (yellow card) 24'; Kučera (yellow card) 45+1'; Čech (yellow card) 52'; Leibl (yellow card) 75'	Report	Olatunji 21', 45+2'; Frýdek 29'; Pourzitidis 88'	Stadium: Stadion u Nisy; Attendance: 950; Referee: Stanislav Volek

26 May 2023 Second leg	Slovan Liberec	2–3 (6–3 agg.)	Hradec Králové	Liberec
18:00 CEST (UTC+2)	Doumbia 22'; Polyák (yellow card) 43'; Tupta 57'	Report	Trusa 52', 81'; Čech (yellow card) 60'; Ryneš (yellow card) 75'; Kubala 78'; Rada (yellow card) 84'	Stadium: Stadion u Nisy; Attendance: 1,758; Referee: Filip Kotala
Note: Slovan Liberec won 6–3 on aggregate.
