= 2021–22 FC Hradec Králové season =

FC Hradec Králové
2021–22 season
- Chairman: Richard Jukl
- Manager: Miroslav Koubek
- Stadium: Všesportovní stadion
- Czech First League: 11th
- Czech Cup: Pre-season
Home colours	Away colours

The 2021–22 season is the 30th season in the existence of FC Hradec Králové and the club's 10th consecutive season in the top flight of Czech football. In addition to the domestic league, FC Hradec Králové are participating in this season's edition of the Czech Cup.

== Players ==
=== First-team squad ===
As of 20 July 2021.

Note: Flags indicate national team as defined under FIFA eligibility rules; some limited exceptions apply. Players may hold more than one non-FIFA nationality.

No.	Pos.	Nation	Player
1	GK	CZE	Patrik Vízek
2	DF	CZE	Jan Král
3	FW	CZE	Filip Kubala
4	DF	CZE	Otto Urma
5	MF	CZE	Dominik Soukeník
6	MF	CZE	Jiří Kateřiňák
8	MF	CZE	Adam Vlkanova
10	MF	CZE	Marek Kejř
11	FW	SVK	Erik Prekop
12	GK	CZE	Vilém Fendrich
13	DF	CZE	Denis Donát
14	DF	CZE	Jakub Klíma (on loan from Mladá Boleslav)
15	FW	CZE	Daniel Vašulín

No.	Pos.	Nation	Player
16	MF	CZE	Filip Novotný
17	FW	CZE	Pavel Dvořák
18	DF	CZE	Michal Leibl
19	DF	CZE	Jan Mejdr
20	GK	CZE	Michal Reichl
21	DF	CZE	Štěpán Harazim
22	MF	CZE	Petr Kodeš
23	MF	CZE	Jakub Rada
24	MF	CZE	Jan Záviška
25	DF	CZE	František Čech
26	MF	CZE	Jakub Rezek
28	MF	CZE	David Doležal
30	GK	CZE	Jakub Brát

=== Out on loan ===
Note: Flags indicate national team as defined under FIFA eligibility rules; some limited exceptions apply. Players may hold more than one non-FIFA nationality.

No.	Pos.	Nation	Player
—	FW	CZE	Filip Firbacher (at Vlašim)
—	FW	CZE	Jakub Šípek (at Chrudim)

== Competitions ==
=== Overall record ===
Competition	First match	Last match	Starting round	Final position	Record							
Competition	First match	Last match	Starting round	Final position	Pld	W	D	L	GF	GA	GD	Win %
Czech First League	24 July 2021	15 May 2022	Matchday 1	6th	35	10	14	11	44	52	−8	28.57
Czech Cup	1 September 2021	25 March 2022	Second round	Semi-finals	5	4	0	1	10	3	+7	80.00
Total					40	14	14	12	54	55	−1	35.00

Source: Soccerway

=== Czech First League ===
==== League table ====
Pos	Team	Pld	W	D	L	GF	GA	GD	Pts	Qualification or relegation
4	Slovácko	30	18	5	7	50	30	+20	59	Qualification for the championship group
5	Baník Ostrava	30	14	9	7	54	39	+15	51	Qualification for the championship group
6	Hradec Králové	30	9	13	8	38	40	−2	40	Qualification for the championship group
7	Mladá Boleslav	30	11	5	14	45	48	−3	38	Qualification for the play-off
8	Slovan Liberec	30	10	7	13	29	38	−9	37	Qualification for the play-off

Source: Fortuna Liga
Rules for classification: 1) Points; 2) Head-to-head points; 3) Head-to-head goal difference; 4) Head-to-head goals scored; 5) Goal difference; 6) Goals scored; 7) Fair-play ranking; 8) Draw.

Pos	Team	Pld	W	D	L	GF	GA	GD	Pts	Qualification or relegation	PLZ	SLA	SPA	SLO	OST	HKR
1	Viktoria Plzeň (C)	35	26	7	2	63	21	+42	85	Qualification for the Champions League second qualifying round	—	—	3–0	3–1	1–0	—
2	Slavia Prague	35	24	6	5	80	27	+53	78	Qualification for the Europa Conference League second qualifying round	1–1	—	1–2	3–0	—	—
3	Sparta Prague	35	22	7	6	72	40	+32	73	Qualification for the Europa Conference League second qualifying round	—	—	—	1–2	3–1	1–1
4	Slovácko	35	21	5	9	59	38	+21	68	Qualification to Europa League third qualifying round (Note: Slovácko qualified for the Europa League as Czech Cup winners.)	—	—	—	—	3–1	3–0
5	Baník Ostrava	35	15	10	10	60	48	+12	55		—	1–1	—	—	—	3–1
6	Hradec Králové	35	10	14	11	44	52	−8	44		0–2	4–3	—	—	—	—

Source: Fortuna Liga
Legend: Blue = home team win; Yellow = draw; Red = away team win.
Rules for classification: 1) Total points; 2) Points earned in regular season; 3) Head-to-head points (regular season); 4) Head-to-head goal difference (regular season); 5) Head-to-head goals scored (regular season); 5) Goal difference (all matches); 6) Goals scored (all matches); 7) Fair-play ranking; 8) Draw.
(C) Champions

==== Results summary ====
Overall								Home						Away					
Pld	W	D	L	GF	GA	GD	Pts	W	D	L	GF	GA	GD	W	D	L	GF	GA	GD
35	10	14	11	44	52	−8	44	7	7	3	28	23	+5	3	7	8	16	29	−13

Source: Fortuna Liga

==== Matches ====
24 July 2021 1	Hradec Králové	1–1	Bohemians 1905	Mladá Boleslav (Note: Hradec Králové played their home matches in Mladá Boleslav due to the rebuilding of their own Všesportovní stadion.)
16:00 CEST (UTC+2)	Vašulín 15'	Report	Puškáč 53'	Stadium: Lokotrans Aréna; Attendance: 1,216; Referee: Pavel Julínek

31 July 2021 2	Karviná	1–1	Hradec Králové	Karviná
16:00 CEST (UTC+2)	Sinyavskiy 24'	Report	Dvořák 5'	Stadium: Městský stadion Attendance: 2,053; Referee: Ondřej Cieslar

7 August 2021 3	Hradec Králové	1–1	Slovan Liberec	Mladá Boleslav
16:00 CEST (UTC+2)	Král 67'	Report	Rabušic 9'	Stadium: Lokotrans Aréna; Attendance: 960; Referee: Zbyněk Proske

15 August 2021 4	Slovácko	1–0	Hradec Králové	Uherské Hradiště
16:00 CEST (UTC+2)	Mareček 51'	Report		Stadium: Městský fotbalový stadion Miroslava Valenty; Attendance: 3,657; Referee: Tomáš Batík

21 August 2021 5	Sparta Prague	4–0	Hradec Králové	Prague
19:00 CEST (UTC+2)	Hložek 54'; Pešek 67', 88'; Polidar 72'	Report		Stadium: Generali Arena; Attendance: 6,263; Referee: Jan Machálek

29 August 2021 6	Hradec Králové	1–0	Viktoria Plzeň	Mladá Boleslav
16:00 CEST (UTC+2)	Rada 58'	Report		Stadium: Lokotrans Aréna; Attendance: 1,243; Referee: Tomáš Klíma

12 September 2021 7	České Budějovice	0–1	Hradec Králové	České Budějovice
14:00 CEST (UTC+2)		Report	Vašulín 53'	Stadium: Stadion Střelecký ostrov Attendance: 2,842; Referee: Ondřej Ginzel

17 September 2021 8	Hradec Králové	2–0	Pardubice	Mladá Boleslav
19:00 CEST (UTC+2)	Král 37'; Vašulín 88'	Report		Stadium: Lokotrans Aréna; Attendance: 1,605; Referee: Ladislav Szikszay

26 September 2021 9	Slavia Prague	4–1	Hradec Králové	Prague
19:00 CEST (UTC+2)	Kuchta 7', 50'; Samek 40'; Traoré 60'	Report	Kateřiňák 90+1'	Stadium: Fortuna Arena; Attendance: 10,213; Referee: Jan Petřík

3 October 2021 10	Hradec Králové	2–2	Jablonec	Mladá Boleslav
16:00 CEST (UTC+2)	Dvořák 19'; Král 62'	Report	Kratochvíl 13'; Malínský 90+8'	Stadium: Lokotrans Aréna; Attendance: 854; Referee: Petr Hocek

17 October 2021 11	Fastav Zlín	2–3	Hradec Králové	Zlín
16:00 CEST (UTC+2)	Tkáč 52'; Dramé 90+3'	Report	Dvořák 2'; Vlkanova 55', 90'	Stadium: Letná Stadion; Attendance: 2,409; Referee: Dalibor Černý

24 October 2021 12	Hradec Králové	3–0	Teplice	Mladá Boleslav
16:00 CEST (UTC+2)	Dvořák 2', 85'; Rada 35'	Report		Stadium: Lokotrans Aréna; Attendance: 849; Referee: Ondřej Berka

31 October 2021 13	Mladá Boleslav	3–2	Hradec Králové	Mladá Boleslav
15:00 CET (UTC+1)	Dancák 29'; Ewerton 45'; Šeda 78'	Report	Rada 41'; Vlkanova 51'	Stadium: Lokotrans Aréna; Attendance: 2,562; Referee: Tomáš Klíma

6 November 2021 14	Hradec Králové	1–1	Baník Ostrava	Mladá Boleslav
15:00 CET (UTC+1)	Kubala 65'	Report	Kuzmanović 73'	Stadium: Lokotrans Aréna; Attendance: 1,211; Referee: Tomáš Batík

20 November 2021 15	Sigma Olomouc	2–2	Hradec Králové	Olomouc
15:00 CET (UTC+1)	Růsek 28'; Breite 47'	Report	Rada 64' (pen.); Vlkanova 76'	Stadium: Andrův stadion Attendance: 3,167; Referee: Ondrej Pechanec

28 November 2021 16	Hradec Králové	1–0	Karviná	Mladá Boleslav
15:00 CET (UTC+1)	Rada 45+3'	Report		Stadium: Lokotrans Aréna; Attendance: 246; Referee: Josef Krejsa

4 December 2021 17	Slovan Liberec	1–0	Hradec Králové	Liberec
15:00 CET (UTC+1)	Tupta 38'	Report		Stadium: Stadion u Nisy; Attendance: 1,000; Referee: Tomáš Klíma

11 December 2021 18	Hradec Králové	2–2	Slovácko	Mladá Boleslav
15:00 CET (UTC+1)	Vlkanova 63'; Rada 81' (pen.)	Report	Jurečka 36', 83'	Stadium: Lokotrans Aréna; Attendance: 390; Referee: Pavel Franěk

18 December 2021 19	Hradec Králové	0–1	Sparta Prague	Mladá Boleslav
18:00 CET (UTC+1)		Report	Hložek 75'	Stadium: Lokotrans Aréna; Attendance: 1,000; Referee: Petr Hocek

6 February 2022 20	Viktoria Plzeň	1–0	Hradec Králové	Plzeň
18:00 CET (UTC+1)	Chorý 28'	Report		Stadium: Doosan Arena; Attendance: 1,000; Referee: Jan Machálek

12 February 2022 21	Hradec Králové	2–2	České Budějovice	Mladá Boleslav
15:00 CET (UTC+1)	Rada 26', 76' (pen.)	Report	van Buren 45+1'; Mic. Škoda 56'	Stadium: Lokotrans Aréna; Attendance: 638; Referee: Marek Radina

19 February 2022 22	Pardubice	0–0	Hradec Králové	Prague (Note: Pardubice continued playing their home matches in Ďolíček due to the rebuilding of their own stadium Pod Vinicí.)
15:00 CET (UTC+1)		Report		Stadium: Ďolíček; Attendance: 1,237; Referee: Jan Petřík

27 February 2022 23	Hradec Králové	1–5	Slavia Prague	Mladá Boleslav
15:00 CET (UTC+1)	Rybička 90+1'	Report	Hromada 2'; Lingr 12', 70'; Tecl 22', 30'	Stadium: Lokotrans Aréna; Attendance: 2,514; Referee: Tomáš Klíma

6 March 2022 24	Jablonec	1–1	Hradec Králové	Jablonec nad Nisou
15:00 CET (UTC+1)	Ikaunieks 89'	Report	Kubala 70'	Stadium: Stadion Střelnice; Attendance: 1,485; Referee: Zbyněk Proske

12 March 2022 25	Hradec Králové	2–1	Fastav Zlín	Mladá Boleslav
15:00 CET (UTC+1)	Vraštil 10' (o.g.); Kubala 14' (pen.)	Report	Reiter 62'	Stadium: Lokotrans Aréna; Attendance: 1,173; Referee: Josef Krejsa

20 March 2022 26	Teplice	1–2	Hradec Králové	Teplice
15:00 CET (UTC+1)	Ledecký 6'	Report	Rada 11' (pen.); Král 7'	Stadium: Na Stínadlech; Attendance: 2,471; Referee: Tomáš Batík

3 April 2022 27	Hradec Králové	2–2	Mladá Boleslav	Mladá Boleslav
16:00 CEST (UTC+2)	Vlkanova 7'; Kubala 61'	Report	Douděra 20'; Šimek 81'	Stadium: Lokotrans Aréna; Attendance: 836; Referee: Jan Machálek

10 April 2022 28	Baník Ostrava	0–0	Hradec Králové	Ostrava
16:00 CEST (UTC+2)		Report		Stadium: Městský stadion Attendance: 5,441; Referee: Marek Radina

17 April 2022 29	Hradec Králové	3–0	Sigma Olomouc	Mladá Boleslav
17:00 CEST (UTC+2)	Mejdr 38'; Vašulín 60', 78'	Report		Stadium: Lokotrans Aréna; Attendance: 670; Referee: Dalibor Černý

20 April 2022 30	Bohemians 1905	1–1	Hradec Králové	Prague
18:00 CEST (UTC+2)	Hronek 62'	Report	Kučera 51'	Stadium: Ďolíček; Attendance: 2,712; Referee: Josef Krejsa

=== Czech Cup ===
1 September 2021 Second round	Olympie Březová	0–2	Hradec Králové	Březová
17:00 CEST (UTC+2)		Report	Prekop 23', 70'	Stadium: Stadion Olympie Brezova

22 September 2021 Third round	Zápy	0–4	Hradec Králové	Zápy
15:30 CEST (UTC+2)		Report	Kubala 36'; Soukeník 80'; Prekop 81'; Vlkanova 87'	Stadium: Teletník Arena; Referee: Josef Krejsa

27 October 2021 Fourth round	Baník Ostrava	1–2	Hradec Králové	Ostrava
16:30 CEST (UTC+2)	Buchta 51'	Report	Harazim 29'; Prekop 60'	Stadium: Městský stadion Referee: Jan Machálek

15 February 2022 Quarter-finals	Hradec Králové	2–1 (a.e.t.)	Bohemians 1905	Mladá Boleslav
16:00 CET (UTC+1)	Prekop 90+5'; Vašulín 107'	Report	Puškáč 10'	Stadium: Lokotrans Aréna; Referee: Tomáš Klíma

25 March 2022 Semi-finals	Hradec Králové	0–1	Slovácko	Mladá Boleslav
17:00 CET (UTC+1)		Report	Šašinka 36'	Stadium: Lokotrans Aréna; Referee: Ladislav Szikszay
