= 2026–27 Czech First League =

Czech First League
- Season: 2026–27
- Dates: 25 July 2026 – 29 May 2027
- Matches: 119
- Goals: 331 (2.78 per match)
- Top goalscorer: Martin Šubert, Mojmír Chytil, Jonatan Braut Brunes (7 goals)
- Biggest home win: Hradec Králové 5–0 Olomouc; 7 November 2026
- Biggest away win: Jablonec 0–5 Slavia; 31 October 2026
- Highest scoring: Teplice 5–5 Plzeň; 8 August 2026
- All statistics correct as of 22 November 2026.

The 2026–27 Czech First League, known as the Chance Liga for sponsorship reasons, will be the 34th season of the Czech Republic's top-tier football for professional clubs since its establishment, in 1993. Slavia Prague are the reigning champions. The season is scheduled to start in July 2026. The first half of the season will have 18 rounds, finishing in December, and the other half will commence on 30 January 2027. The season is expected to end on 29 May 2027 with two extra play-out fixtures on 3–6 June 2027.

== Format ==
The general season format is unchanged from last season. The 16 clubs will play each other home and away, until the league is split up in championship, play-off and relegation groups. The lowest-ranked team will be relegated directly to the second league, and the two teams positioned 14th and 15th will play a play-out with two teams from the second league positioned 2nd and 3rd in a home and away format. VAR will be featured at all matches played. There are no changes in the rules. The only adjustment compared to last season is the match schedule, which has been adapted to the 2026 FIFA World Cup, and therefore only 18 rounds are planned for the autumn part of the league instead of the usual 19.

== Teams ==
Locations of the 2026–27 Czech First League teams

=== Promotion and relegation (pre-season) ===
A total of sixteen teams contest the league, including thirteen sides from the 2025–26 season, the winner of last season's second league, and two winners of the play-out, determined on 30–31 May 2026.

Teams promoted to Czech First League

After being relegated in the 2022–23 season, FC Zbrojovka Brno returns to Czech First League as the champion of the 2025–26 Czech National Football League.

Teams relegated from Czech First League

The lowest positioned team from the last season, FK Dukla Prague, was relegated to the Czech National Football League after one year at top tier.

Karviná match-fixing

On 15 June 2026, MFK Karviná was administratively relegated to the second-tier FNL by the Ethics Committee of the FAČR due to alleged match-fixing. The club appealed the decision and the fixtures of the 2026–27 season were drawn with Karviná as a member of the league. On 28 June 2026, the club decided to withdraw its appeal and leave the Czech First League. Because the 2025–26 season was officially concluded on 22 June, the Karviná's place in the league was preferentially offered to the Czech National Football League's last season best teams. After FC Silon Táborsko rejected the offer, Karviná was replaced by SK Artis Brno, making this the first season in which Artis Brno is participating in the Czech First League.

=== Locations and stadiums ===
Team	Location	Stadium	Capacity	Ref.
SK Artis Brno	Brno	Městský fotbalový stadion Srbská	10,785	
Bohemians 1905	Prague	Ďolíček	6,300	
FC Hradec Králové	Hradec Králové	Malšovická aréna	9,300	
FK Jablonec	Jablonec nad Nisou	Stadion Střelnice	5,690	
FC Slovan Liberec	Liberec	Stadion u Nisy	9,900	
FK Mladá Boleslav	Mladá Boleslav	Lokotrans Aréna	5,000	
SK Sigma Olomouc	Olomouc	Andrův stadion	12,474	
FC Baník Ostrava	Ostrava	Městský stadion (Ostrava)	15,081	
FK Pardubice	Pardubice	CFIG Arena	4,620	
FC Viktoria Plzeň	Plzeň	Doosan Arena	11,597	
SK Slavia Prague	Prague	Fortuna Arena	19,370	
1. FC Slovácko	Uherské Hradiště	Městský fotbalový stadion Miroslava Valenty	8,000	
AC Sparta Prague	Prague	epet ARENA	18,349	
FK Teplice	Teplice	Na Stínadlech	17,078	
FC Zbrojovka Brno	Brno	Městský fotbalový stadion Srbská	10,785	
FC Zlín	Zlín	Letná Stadion (Zlín)	5,898	

Rank	Region	Number of teams	Club(s)
1	Prague	3	Bohemians 1905, Sparta Prague, Slavia Prague
2	Liberec	2	Jablonec, Slovan Liberec
2	South Moravian	2	Artis Brno, Zbrojovka Brno
2	Zlín	2	Slovácko, Zlín
5	Central Bohemian	1	Mladá Boleslav
5	Hradec Králové	1	Hradec Králové
5	Moravian-Silesian	1	Baník Ostrava
5	Olomouc	1	Sigma Olomouc
5	Pardubice	1	Pardubice
5	Plzeň	1	Viktoria Plzeň
5	Ústí nad Labem	1	Teplice

=== Personnel and kits ===
Team	Head coach	Captain	Kit manufacturer	Shirt sponsor
SK Artis Brno	(Czech Republic) Roman Nádvorník	(Czech Republic) Martin Pospíšil	Kappa	TEDOM
Baník Ostrava	(Czech Republic) Roman Skuhravý	(Czech Republic) Martin Jedlička	Macron	Fortuna
Bohemians Praha 1905	(Czech Republic) Jaroslav Veselý	(Czech Republic) Aleš Čermák	Puma	Balshop
FC Hradec Králové	(Czech Republic) David Horejš	(Czech Republic) Vladimír Darida	Jako	Tipsport
FK Jablonec	(Czech Republic) Luboš Kozel	(Serbia) Nemanja Tekijaški	Macron	Chance
FK Mladá Boleslav	(Czech Republic) Aleš Majer	(Slovakia) Martin Králik	Puma	Škoda Auto
FK Pardubice	(Czech Republic) Jan Trousil	(Czech Republic) Vojtěch Patrák	Joma	Tipsport
SK Sigma Olomouc	(Portugal) Jaime Monroy	(Czech Republic) Jan Kliment	Adidas	Creditas
SK Slavia Prague	(Czech Republic) Jindřich Trpišovský	(Czech Republic) Tomáš Holeš	Castore	eToro
1. FC Slovácko	(Czech Republic) Jan Jelínek	(Czech Republic) Michal Trávník	Puma	Solar Global
FC Slovan Liberec	(Slovakia) Branislav Fodrek	(Czech Republic) Tomáš Koubek	Nike	Tipsport
AC Sparta Prague	(Denmark) Brian Priske	(Czech Republic) Adam Karabec	Adidas	Betano
FK Teplice	(Slovakia) Zdenko Frťala	(Czech Republic) Michal Bílek	Macron	AGC
FC Viktoria Plzeň	(Czech Republic) Radoslav Kováč	(Czech Republic) Matěj Vydra	Macron	Doosan
FC Zbrojovka Brno	(Czech Republic) Martin Svědík	(Czech Republic) Jakub Klíma	Puma	Fastav
FC Zlín	(Czech Republic) Pavel Hoftych	(Czech Republic) Tomáš Poznar	Adidas	PSG

== Managerial changes ==
Pre-season:

Team	Outgoing manager	Manner of departure	Date of vacancy	Replaced by	Date of appointment	Contract valid until
Slovácko	(Football Association of the Czech Republic) Roman Skuhravý	End of contract	10 June 2026	(Football Association of the Czech Republic) Jan Jelínek	16 June 2026	2029
Baník Ostrava	(Football Association of the Czech Republic) Josef Dvorník	Sacked	10 June 2026	(Football Association of the Czech Republic) Roman Skuhravý	10 June 2026	Undisclosed
Slovan Liberec	(Football Association of the Czech Republic) Radoslav Kováč	Sacked	18 June 2026	(Slovak Football Association) Branislav Fodrek	18 June 2026	Undisclosed

During the season:

Team	Outgoing manager	Manner of departure	Date of vacancy	Match-week	Position in table	Replaced by	Date of appointment	Contract valid until
Viktoria Plzeň	(Football Association of the Czech Republic) Martin Hyský	Sacked	21 August 2026	4	10th	(Football Association of the Czech Republic) Radoslav Kováč	23 August 2026	End of the season
Zlín	(Football Association of the Czech Republic) Bronislav Červenka	Sacked	7 September 2026	7	16th	(Football Association of the Czech Republic) Pavel Hoftych	7 September 2026	End of 2026
Sigma Olomouc	(Football Association of the Czech Republic) Pavel Hapal	Sacked	7 November 2026	14	4th	(Portuguese Football Federation) Jaime Monroy	12 November 2026	Undisclosed

== Regular season ==
=== League table ===
Pos	Team	Pld	W	D	L	GF	GA	GD	Pts	Qualification or relegation
1	Slavia Prague	15	11	4	0	38	8	+30	37	Qualification for the championship group
2	Slovan Liberec	14	9	2	3	19	9	+10	29	Qualification for the championship group
3	Mladá Boleslav	15	8	4	3	23	15	+8	28	Qualification for the championship group
4	Sparta Prague	15	7	3	5	27	17	+10	24	Qualification for the championship group
5	Teplice	15	7	3	5	24	23	+1	24	Qualification for the championship group
6	Sigma Olomouc	15	7	3	5	22	22	0	24	Qualification for the championship group
7	Viktoria Plzeň	15	6	5	4	31	23	+8	23	Qualification for the middle group
8	Jablonec	15	6	3	6	17	21	−4	21	Qualification for the middle group
9	Zbrojovka Brno	15	6	3	6	18	23	−5	21	Qualification for the middle group
10	Bohemians 1905	15	5	5	5	16	17	−1	20	Qualification for the middle group
11	Pardubice	15	5	3	7	20	21	−1	18	Qualification for the relegation group
12	Hradec Králové	15	5	3	7	19	22	−3	18	Qualification for the relegation group
13	Baník Ostrava	14	4	2	8	11	25	−14	14	Qualification for the relegation group
14	Artis Brno	15	3	4	8	18	29	−11	13	Qualification for the relegation group
15	Slovácko	15	3	4	8	17	28	−11	13	Qualification for the relegation group
16	Zlín	15	0	3	12	11	28	−17	3	Qualification for the relegation group

Updated to match(es) played on 22 November 2026. Source: Chance Liga
Rules for classification: 1) Points; 2) Head-to-head points; 3) Head-to-head goal difference; 4) Head-to-head goals scored; 5) Goal difference; 6) Goals scored; 7) Fair-play ranking; 8) Draw.

=== Results ===
Home \ Away	ART	BOH	HKR	JAB	LIB	MLA	OLO	OST	PCE	PLZ	SLA	SLO	SPA	TEP	ZBR	ZLN
Artis Brno	—	1–2		3–1	0–0	2–4	1–2	12 Dec		0–3			0–4		27 Nov	2–2
Bohemians 1905		—	0–0	1–1		1–0		1–0		1–2		2–0	0–0			6 Dec
Hradec Králové	2–4	28 Nov	—	1–2			5–0	2–1	2–1	0–0			2–1	0–2	12 Dec	
Jablonec		13 Dec		—	1–2	0–0	2–1	3–0	29 Nov	2–3	0–5	1–0				1–1
Slovan Liberec		1–0	2–0		—	3–0					1–1	0–2		0–1	5 Dec	
Mladá Boleslav			3–1			—	28 Nov	4–0	12 Dec			2–1	2–0	1–0	2–0	1–0
Sigma Olomouc	5 Dec	3–0			1–0	2–2	—		3–1		0–2	13 Dec	0–3		3–0	
Baník Ostrava	1–0		6 Dec				1–0	—	1–2	0–4	0–4		0–0	1–2		
Pardubice	1–2	2–1		0–2	1–2	1–1			—		4 Dec				1–1	3–0
Viktoria Plzeň					1–3	3–0	2–3		25 Oct	—		1–1	1–1	6 Dec	1–1	3–2
Slavia Prague	4–1	2–2	0–0		13 Dec	1–1		29 Nov	2–1	2–1	—	5–1	a		4–0	
Slovácko	1–1		4–2	5 Dec			1–2	2–2	0–0			—		1–3	1–2	
Sparta Prague				2–0	1–3	5 Dec			2–0		0–3	5–1	—	4–1		3–1
Teplice	0–0	3–1		2–0	28 Nov		1–1		1–4	5–5	0–2		14 Dec	—	0–2	
Zbrojovka Brno	2–1	2–2	1–0	0–1	0–1			1–3		29 Nov			3–1		—	3–2
Zlín		0–2	1–2		0–1		1–1	0–1		14 Dec	0–1	0–1	29 Nov	1–3		—

Updated to match(es) played on 22 November 2026. Source: Chance Liga
Legend: Blue = home team win; Yellow = draw; Red = away team win.
For upcoming matches, an "a" indicates there is an article about the rivalry between the two participants.

== Season statistics ==
=== Top scorers ===
As of 22 November 2026

Rank	Player	Club	Goals
1	(Czech Republic) Martin Šubert	Mladá Boleslav	7
1	(Czech Republic) Mojmír Chytil	Slavia	7
1	(Norway) Jonatan Braut Brunes	Sparta	7
4	(Czech Republic) Václav Sejk	Olomouc	6
4	(Czech Republic) Christophe Kabongo	Plzeň	6
4	(Czech Republic) Lukáš Mašek	Liberec	6
7	(Poland) Wiktor Nowak	Slavia	5
7	(Ecuador) John Mercado	Sparta	5
7	(Czech Republic) Daniel Vašulín	Zbrojovka	5
7	(Czech Republic) Aleš Čermák	Bohemians 1905	5
7	(Nigeria) Emmanuel Ayaosi	Slavia	5
7	(Czech Republic) Tomáš Čvančara	Hradec Králové	5

=== Hat-tricks ===
Matchweek	Date	Player	For	Against	Result
12	25 October 2026	(Norway) Jonatan Braut Brunes^{4}	Sparta	Slovácko	5–1 (H)
14	7 November 2026	(Czech Republic) Filip Kubala	Ostrava	Zbrojovka	3–1 (A)

Notes

^{4} Player scored 4 goals
(H) – Home team
(A) – Away team

=== Clean sheets ===
As of 22 November 2026

Rank	Player	Club	Clean sheets
1	(Czech Republic) Jakub Markovič	Slavia	7
2	(Slovakia) Tomáš Frühwald	Bohemians 1905	6
2	(Slovakia) Jakub Surovčík	Sparta	6
2	(Czech Republic) Tomáš Koubek	Liberec	6
5	(Football Association of the Czech Republic) Martin Jedlička	Ostrava	4
5	(Czech Republic) Matouš Trmal	Teplice	4
5	(Czech Republic) Adam Zadražil	Hradec Králové	4
8	(Czech Republic) Jiří Floder	Mladá Boleslav	3
8	(Czech Republic) Jan Koutný	Olomouc	3
8	(Austria) Florian Wiegele	Plzeň	3
8	(Czech Republic) Milan Heča	Slovácko	3
8	(Slovenia) Klemen Mihelak	Jablonec	3
8	(Czech Republic) Vojtěch Vorel	Mladá Boleslav	3

== See also ==
- 2026–27 Czech National Football League
- 2026–27 Czech Cup
