= Podhajsky =

Podhajský (feminine: Podhajská) is a Czech surname.

People with the surname include:

- Alois Podhajsky (1898–1973), Austrian equestrian
- Karel Podhajský (born 1973), Czech association footballer
- Leif Podhajsky (fl. 2000s), Australian graphic designer and art director
- Minka Podhajská (1881–1963), Czech artist

== See also ==
- Mitch Podhajski (born 1999), Australian rules footballer for Collingwood
