= Šubert =

Šubert (feminine: Šubertová) is a Czech-language spelling of the German surname Schubert. Notable people with the surname include:

- František Šubert (1849–1915), Czech writer, playwright, journalist and theatre director
- Martin Šubert (born 2002), Czech footballer
- Martina Navratilova (born 1956), Czech-American tennis player, born Šubertová
