= Chýnov =

- Town
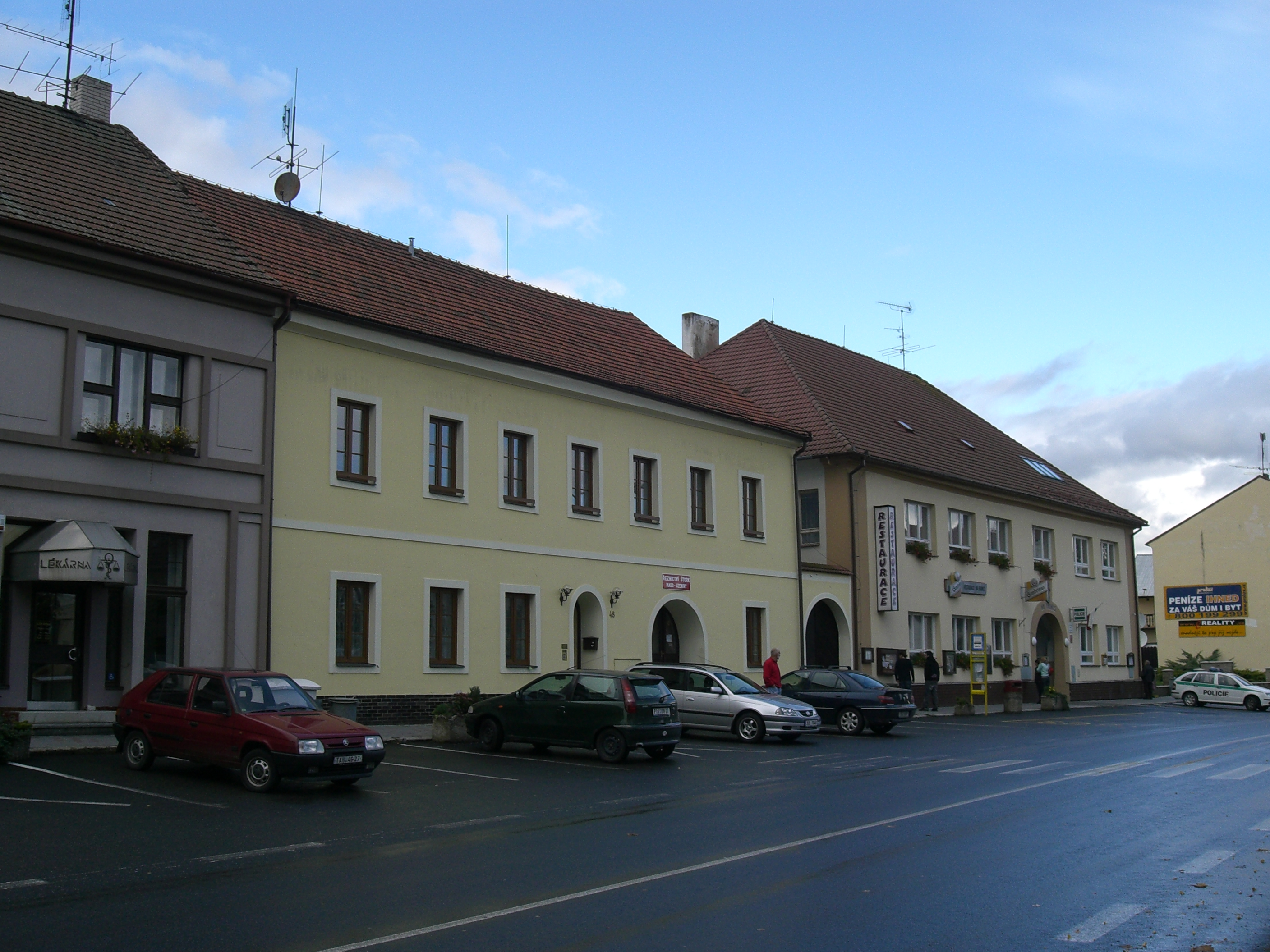
- Town square

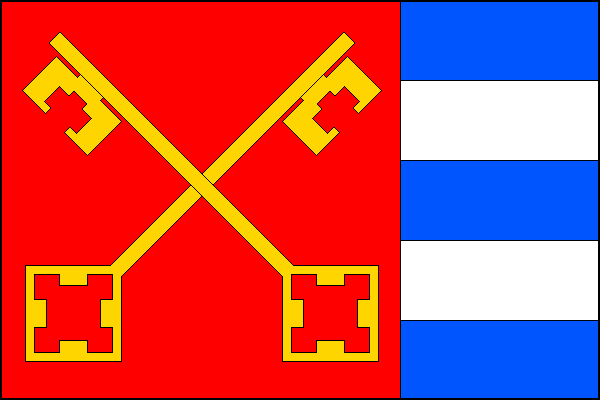
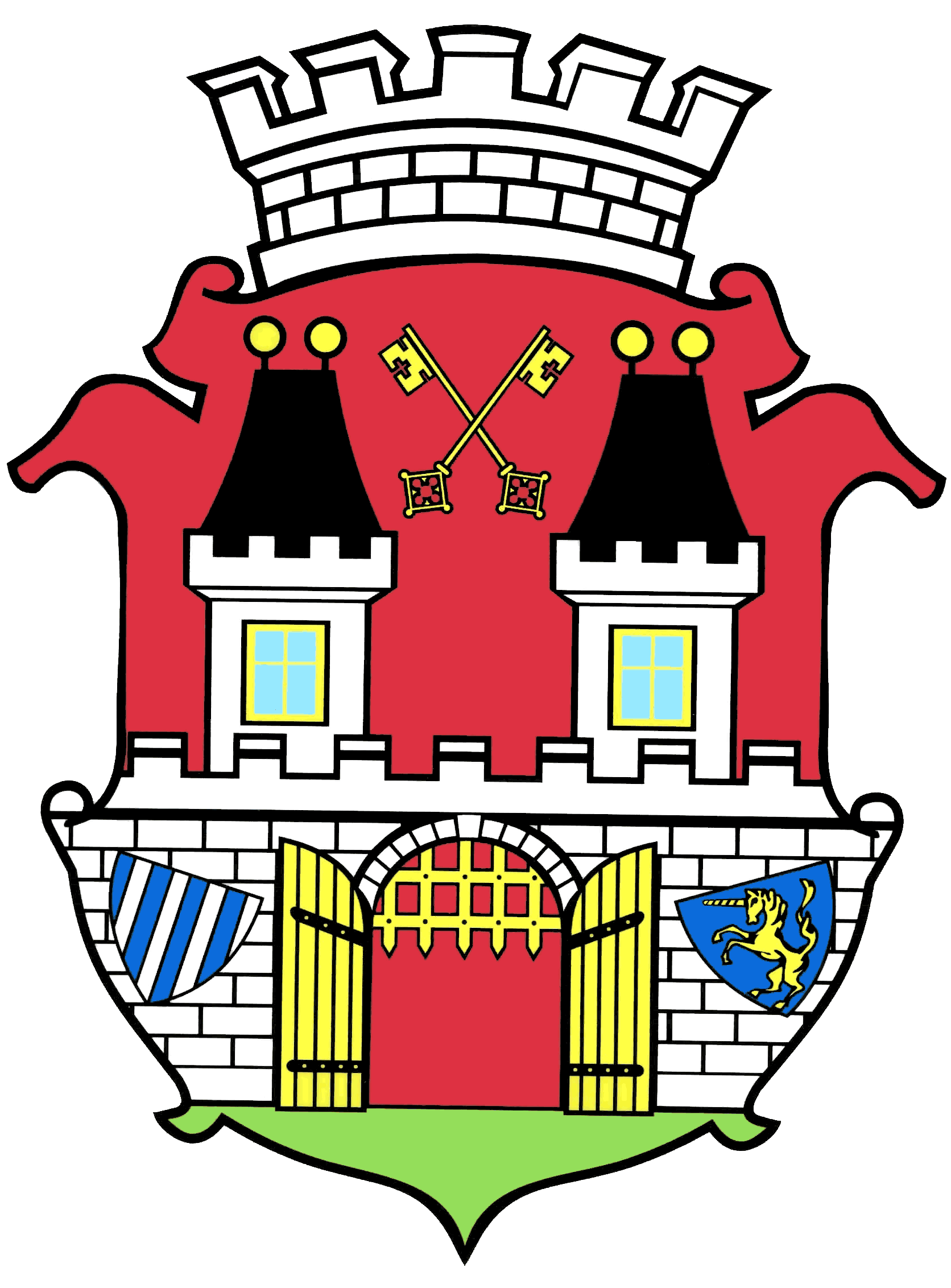
- Flag Coat of arms

- Location in the Czech Republic
- Coordinates: 49°24′25″N 14°48′40″E
- Country: Czech Republic
- Region: South Bohemian
- District: Tábor
- First mentioned: 981

Government
  - Mayor: Jan Fučík

Area
  - Total: 30.51 km^{2} (11.78 sq mi)
- Elevation: 488 m (1,601 ft)

Population (2026-01-01)
  - Total: 2,563
  - Density: 84.01/km^{2} (217.6/sq mi)
- Time zone: UTC+1 (CET)
  - Summer (DST): UTC+2 (CEST)
- Postal code: 391 55
- Website: www.chynov.cz

Chýnov (Czech pronunciation: [ˈxiːnof]) is a town in Tábor District in the South Bohemian Region of the Czech Republic. It has about 2,600 inhabitants.

== Administrative division ==
Chýnov consists of five municipal parts (in brackets population according to the 2021 census):

- Chýnov (1,949)
- Dobronice u Chýnova (143)
- Kloužovice (174)
- Velmovice (70)
- Záhostice (119)

== Etymology ==
The name is derived from the personal name Chýna, meaning "Chýna's (castle)".

== Geography ==
Chýnov is located about 9 kilometres (6 mi) east of Tábor and 53 km (33 mi) northeast of České Budějovice. The built-up area lies in the Křemešník Highlands, but the municipal territory extends into the Tábor Uplands in the west. The highest point is the hill Ve Vrších at 602 m (1,975 ft) above sea level.

== History ==
The first written mention of Chýnov is from 981, when it was mentioned in Chronica Boemorum. From 1250, the village was owned by the bishopric in Prague. During the rule of bishop Arnošt of Pardubice, the local fortress was rebuilt into a castle, and ponds were established. In the second half of the 15th century, Chýnov was bought by the Malovec of Malovice family. In 1719, the estate was acquired by the House of Schwarzenberg. They had rebuilt the castle into a Baroque aristocratic residence.

In 1903, Chýnov was promoted to a town.

== Demographics ==
Historical population

Year	Pop.	±%
1869	2,156	—
1880	2,381	+10.4%
1890	2,327	−2.3%
1900	2,299	−1.2%
1910	2,204	−4.1%

Year	Pop.	±%
1921	2,055	−6.8%
1930	1,914	−6.9%
1950	1,828	−4.5%
1961	2,117	+15.8%
1970	2,013	−4.9%

Year	Pop.	±%
1980	2,054	+2.0%
1991	2,035	−0.9%
2001	2,070	+1.7%
2011	2,342	+13.1%
2021	2,455	+4.8%

Source: Censuses

== Transport ==
The I/19 road (the section from Tábor to Pelhřimov) runs through the town.

Chýnov is located on the railway line Jihlava–Tábor.

== Sights ==
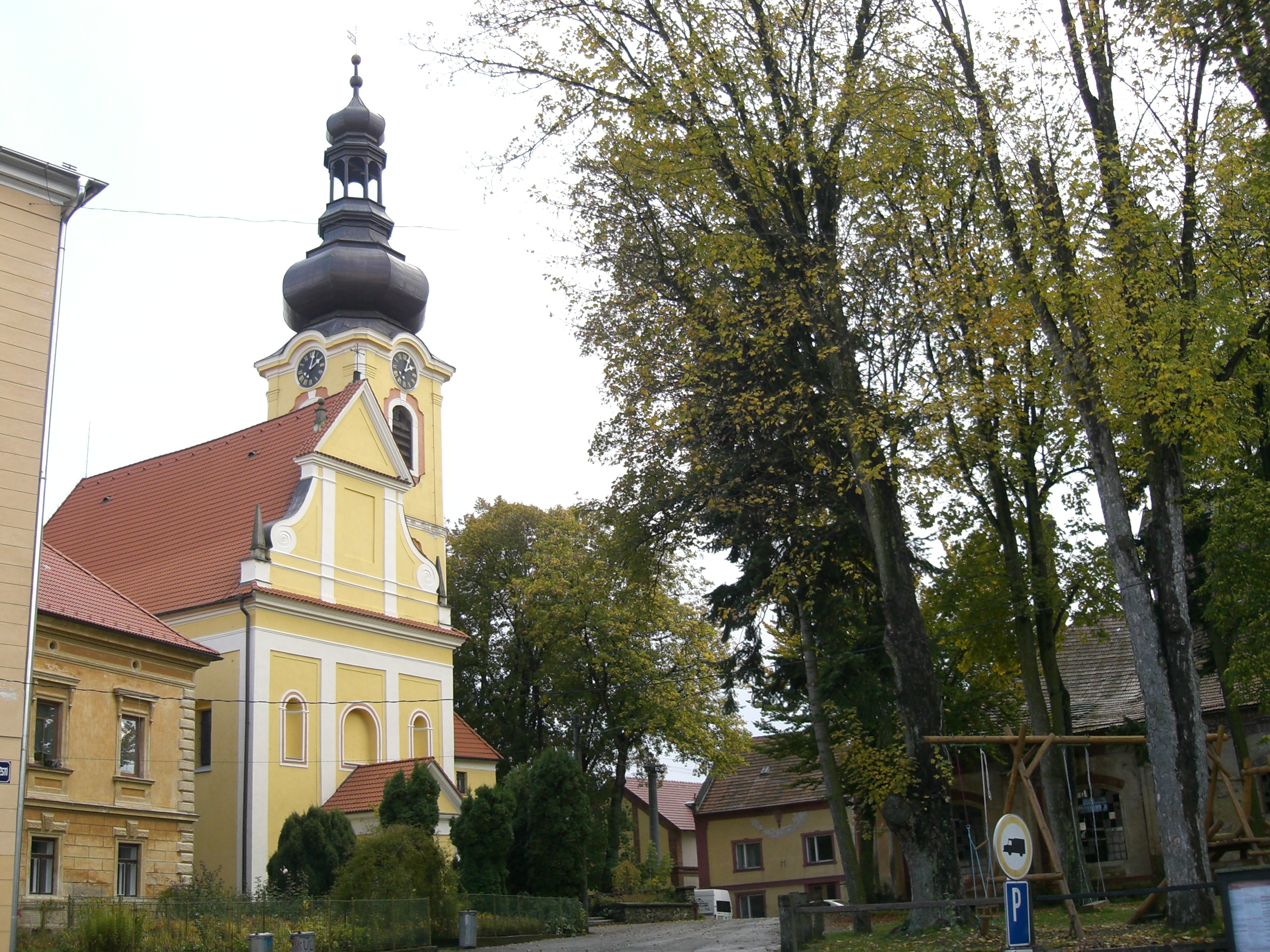
Church of the Holy Trinity

The most important monument of Chýnov is the Church of the Holy Trinity. There was probably originally a Romanesque church from 995, replaced by a new Gothic building in the mid-14th century. In 1670–1679, the church was rebuilt into its current Baroque form. The tower was added in 1727.

The Chýnov Castle was originally a fortress, rebuilt into the Baroque castle in 1730–1732. The English park was founded in the 19th century. Today the castle houses a retirement home.

== Notable people ==
- František Bílek (1872–1941), sculptor and architect
- Adam Zadražil (born 2000), footballer

== Twin towns – sister cities ==
Chýnov is twinned with:

- Oberthal, Switzerland

== See also ==
- 43954 Chýnov, a minor planet named after Chýnov
