= Adam Zadražil =

Czech footballer (born 2000)

Personal information
- Date of birth: 6 August 2000 (age 26)
- Place of birth: Chýnov, Czech Republic
- Height: 1.93 m (6 ft 4 in)
- Position: Goalkeeper

Team information
- Current team: FC Hradec Králové
- Number: 12

Youth career
- 2005–2014: FC Chýnov
- 2014–2016: Spartak MAS Sezimovo Ústí
- 2016–2017: Táborsko

Senior career*
Years	Team	Apps	(Gls)
2017–2023	Táborsko	42	(0)
2023	→ Viktoria Plzeň (loan)	0	(0)
2023	→ Viktoria Plzeň B (loan)	8	(0)
2023–	Hradec Králové	84	(0)

International career
2018	Czech Republic U18	2	(0)
- * Club domestic league appearances and goals as of 27 May 2026

Adam Zadražil (born 6 August 2000) is a Czech professional footballer who plays as a goalkeeper for FC Hradec Králové.

== Life ==
Zadražil was born in Chýnov and started to play football in the local football club at the age of five. Before his football career, he was the Czech vice-champion in BMX.

== Club career ==
From 2016, he played for Táborsko. In March 2018, at the age of 17, he made his senior football debut in Táborsko's Czech National Football League match against SFC Opava, when he came on as a substitute in the 37th minute.

In spring 2023, Zadražil was on loan in Viktoria Plzeň, playing in the Czech First League, but he did not make a single start for the Viktoria's A-team and returned to Táborsko after the 2022–23 season was over. He then transferred to FC Hradec Králové. Zadražil made his Czech First League debut on 11 February 2024, in Hradec Králové's 2–2 home draw against Bohemians 1905. In the spring part of the season, he became a stable member of the starting lineup and kept 8 clean sheets in 16 matches during the season.

== International career ==
Zadražil played two matches for the U18 Czech Republic youth national team. In 2024, he was nominated into the senior Czech Republic national football team for two matches of the 2024–25 UEFA Nations League, but remained only among the substitutes.
