= David Kalousek =

Czech footballer (born 1975)

Personal information
- Date of birth: 13 May 1975 (age 51)
- Place of birth: Hradec Králové, Czechoslovakia
- Height: 1.73 m (5 ft 8 in)
- Position: Defender

Senior career*
| Years | Team | Apps | (Gls) |
| 1994–1995 | Hradec Králové | 1 | (0) |
| 1995 | Pardubice | 14 | (1) |
| 1996 | Chrudim | 11 | (1) |
| 1996 | Turnov | | |
| 1997–2004 | Hradec Králové | 162 | (6) |
| 2004–2006 | Zagłębie Lubin | 28 | (2) |
| 2007–2008 | Arka Gdynia | 18 | (0) |
| 2008–2010 | Hradec Králové | 24 | (1) |
- * Club domestic league appearances and goals

David Kalousek (born 13 May 1975) is a Czech former professional footballer who played as a defender.
