= Martin Šubert =

Czech footballer (born 2002)

Personal information
- Date of birth: 13 August 2002 (age 24)
- Place of birth: Czech Republic
- Height: 1.81 m (5 ft 11 in)
- Position: Midfielder

Team information
- Current team: FK Mladá Boleslav
- Number: 21

Youth career
- 2008–2017: Bílovec
- 2017–2021: Slavia Prague

Senior career*
Years	Team	Apps	(Gls)
2021–2024	Slavia Prague	0	(0)
2021–2024	Slavia Prague B	48	(8)
2023–2024	→ Vlašim	27	(2)
2024	Vlašim	13	(3)
2025	Baník Ostrava	0	(0)
2025	Baník Ostrava B	18	(2)
2025–	Mladá Boleslav	33	(7)

International career^{‡}
2019	Czech Republic U18	3	(0)
2022	Czech Republic U20	2	(0)
2026–	Czech Republic	2	(0)
- * Club domestic league appearances and goals as of 24 September 2026 ‡ National team caps and goals as of 12 November 2026

Martin Šubert (born 13 August 2002) is a Czech professional footballer who plays as a midfielder for FK Mladá Boleslav and the Czech Republic national team.

== Club career ==
Šubert was raised in the football club FK Bílovec in Bílovec, where he played from 2008 to 2017. In 2017, at the age of 15, he transferred to the youth teams of Slavia Prague.

Šubert made his senior football debut for Slavia Prague B in the Bohemian Football League and helped the team to promote to the Czech National Football League. He trained with Slavia's first team but never made an appearance for them. He spent time on loan at Vlašim in the 2023–24 season, playing in the Czech National Football League, and transferred there permanently before the 2024–25 season. After half a year, he moved to Baník Ostrava but did not make any appearances for the first team either. Before the 2025–26 season, he transferred to Mladá Boleslav. He made his debut in the Czech First League on 4 October 2025.

Šubert got off to a strong start in the 2026–27 season. He was named the league's Player of the Month for August, topped the goal-scoring charts with six goals in eight matches, and received his first call-up to the Czech Republic national football team.

== International career ==
Šubert played for the U18 and U20 Czech Republic national teams. In September 2026, he was called up for four matches of the Czech Republic national team in the 2026–27 UEFA Nations League.

== Style of play ==
Šubert is a left-footed footballer valued for his speed and his ability to shoot with both feet.
