= 2026 Czech football match-fixing scandal =

Sports scandal in the Czech Republic

- Date: March 2026 –
- Location: Czech Republic
- Type: Match-fixing scandal, sports bribery, illegal betting.
- Cause: Alleged bribery of referees and players to influence football match outcomes
- Participants: 47+ individuals and clubs
- Outcome: Administrative relegation and a fine of 10 million CZK against MFK Karviná; Bans for players and officials; Exclusion of Karviná from UEFA competitions; A criminal investigation by the Czech Police
- Arrests: Dozens

In a joint effort with Europol, the Czech police executed the most extensive wave of raids and arrests in the country's football history on 24 March 2026. The scandal involves verified 2024 offenses where MFK Karviná used bribery to manipulate the outcome of a Czech First League match and a two-legged relegation playoff.

The crackdown officially commenced at 6:00 AM on 24 March. During this sweep, the Czech National Center for Combating Organized Crime (NCOZ) raided dozens of homes, leading to the formal indictment of 32 individuals within 48 hours. By June 2026, the Football Association of the Czech Republic (FAČR) delivered its final rulings, expelling MFK Karviná from the Czech First League on 15 June. A fine of 10 million CZK was also imposed. Furthermore, on 2 July, UEFA stripped the club of its Europa League spot, which they had earned by winning the Czech Cup back in May.

== See also ==
- Match fixing in association football
- 2025 Turkish football betting scandal
