= Jakub Rada =

Czech footballer (born 1987)

Personal information
- Full name: Jakub Rada
- Date of birth: 5 May 1987 (age 39)
- Place of birth: Prague, Czechoslovakia
- Height: 1.85 m (6 ft 1 in)
- Position: Midfielder

Youth career
- 1993–2006: Sparta Prague

Senior career*
Years	Team	Apps	(Gls)
2006–2013	Sparta Prague	0	(0)
2008–2013	Sparta Prague B	63	(11)
2008	→ Kladno (loan)	1	(0)
2008	→ Slovan Bratislava (loan)	2	(0)
2012–2013	→ Bohemians 1905 (loan)	36	(4)
2013–2015	Bohemians 1905	58	(8)
2015–2019	Mladá Boleslav	46	(7)
2018–2019	→ Spartak Trnava (loan)	11	(1)
2019–2020	Bohemians 1905	8	(1)
2020	→ Hradec Králové (loan)	11	(1)
2020–2024	Hradec Králové	84	(14)

International career
2016	Czech Republic	2	(0)
- * Club domestic league appearances and goals as of 21 January 2024

Jakub Rada (born 5 May 1987) is a Czech former footballer who last played for Hradec Králové as a midfielder.

Rada made several appearances in the Czech First League for SK Kladno, Bohemians 1905 and Mladá Boleslav. He suffered a serious injury in a league match for Boleslav against Hradec Králové in August 2016, tearing ligaments in his knee. In 2019 he won the Slovak Cup with FC Spartak Trnava. He was an unused substitute in the final. In June 2019 he rejoined Bohemians 1905 After playing for Hradec Králové, he announced his retirement from professional football in July 2024.

== International career ==
Rada received his first call up to the senior Czech Republic squad in March 2016 for a friendly against Scotland. He was one of four players to make his international debut against Scotland, playing as a substitute in the 1–0 loss. After his knee injury in August 2016, he never returned to the national team.

== Honours ==
Spartak Trnava

- Slovak Cup: 2018–19
