= Karel Podhajský =

Czech footballer

Personal information
- Date of birth: 24 January 1973 (age 53)
- Place of birth: Czechoslovakia
- Height: 1.86 m (6 ft 1 in)
- Position: Goalkeeper

Senior career*
Years	Team	Apps	(Gls)
1994–1999	Hradec Králové	90	(0)
2000–2001	Jablonec	26	(0)
2001–2003	Hradec Králové	45	(0)

International career
1994	Czech Republic U21	1	(0)
- * Club domestic league appearances and goals

Karel Podhajský (born 24 January 1973) is a Czech footballer who played as a goalkeeper. He made over 150 appearances in the Czech First League between 1994 and 2003.
