= Michal Reichl =

Czech footballer

Personal information
- Date of birth: 14 September 1992 (age 34)
- Place of birth: Czechoslovakia
- Height: 1.87 m (6 ft 2 in)
- Position: Goalkeeper

Team information
- Current team: Bohemians 1905
- Number: 12

Senior career*
Years	Team	Apps	(Gls)
2014–2021	Sigma Olomouc	55	(0)
2021–2023	Hradec Králové	31	(0)
2022	→ Dukla Praha (loan)	7	(0)
2023–	Bohemians 1905	56	(0)

International career^{‡}
2013–2015	Czech Republic U21	1	(0)
- * Club domestic league appearances and goals as of 27 May 2026 ‡ National team caps and goals as of 4 June 2015

Michal Reichl (born 14 September 1992) is a Czech football player who plays for Bohemians 1905 as a goalkeeper.

On 12 July 2023, Reichl signed a contract with Bohemians 1905.
