= Adam Vlkanova =

Czech footballer (born 1994)

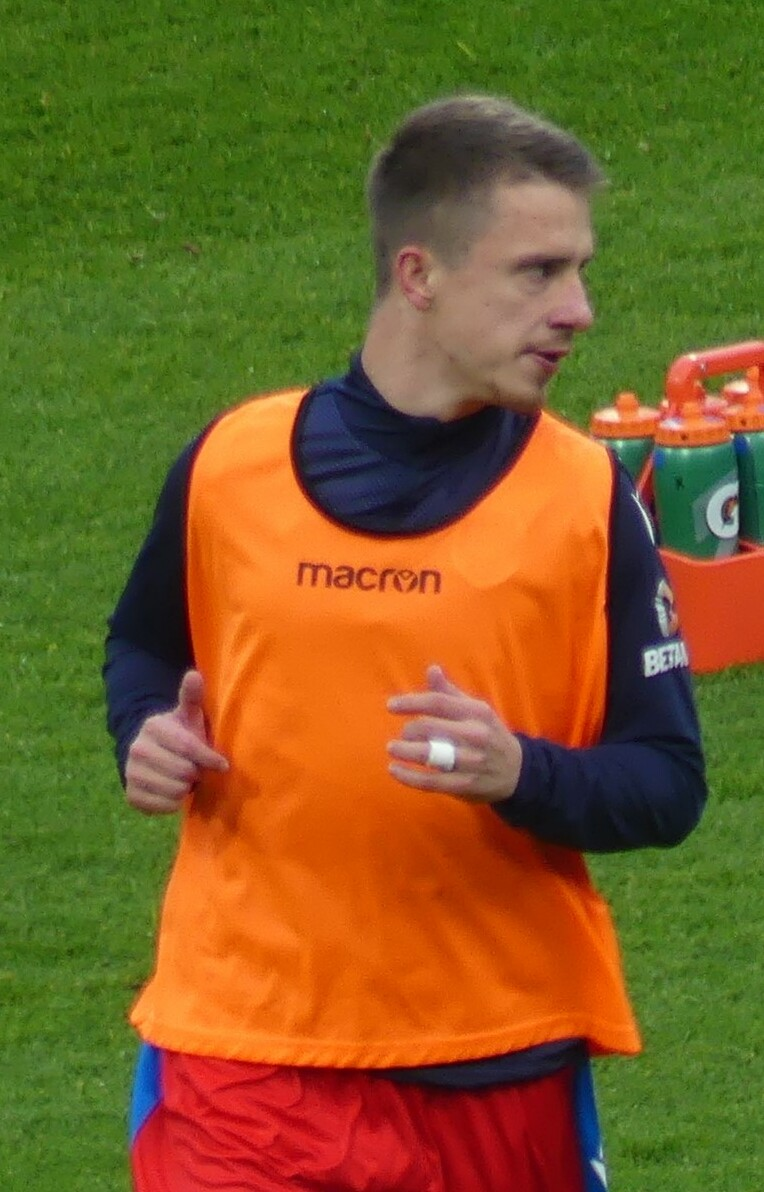
- Vlkanova in 2023

Personal information
- Date of birth: 4 September 1994 (age 32)
- Place of birth: Hradec Králové, Czech Republic
- Height: 1.69 m (5 ft 7 in)
- Position: Attacking midfielder

Team information
- Current team: Hradec Králové
- Number: 58

Youth career
- 2000–2004: Nový Hradec Králové
- 2004–2007: Hradec Králové
- 2007–2013: Olympia Hradec Králové

Senior career*
| Years | Team | Apps | (Gls) |
| 2013–2014 | Bohemians 1905 | 7 | (2) |
| 2014–2022 | Hradec Králové | 179 | (47) |
| 2014 | → Bohemians 1905 (loan) | 4 | (0) |
| 2014 | → Čáslav (loan) | 1 | (1) |
| 2022–2024 | Viktoria Plzeň | 36 | (4) |
| 2024 | → Ruch Chorzów (loan) | 12 | (1) |
| 2024– | Hradec Králové | 60 | (12) |

International career
| 2016 | Czech Republic U21 | 1 | (0) |
| 2022 | Czech Republic | 3 | (0) |
- * Club domestic league appearances and goals as of 27 May 2026

Adam Vlkanova (born 4 September 1994) is a Czech professional footballer who plays as an attacking midfielder for Czech First League club Hradec Králové.

== Club career ==
Vlkanova is a youth product of the academies of Hradec Králové and Olympia Hradec Králové. He began his senior career with Bohemians 1905 in 2013, then in the Czech National Football League. He joined Hradec Králové in the winter of the 2013–14 season, immediately returning to Bohemians for the remainder of the season. In August 2014, he played one game for Čáslav before returning to Hradec Králové. Vlkanova extended his contract with the club in August 2015 for three years, and then in 2019 again extended for three more years until 2022 and being named captain of the club. On 31 August 2022, Vlkanova joined Viktoria Plzeň on a three-year contract.

On 8 January 2024, Vlkanova joined Polish Ekstraklasa club Ruch Chorzów on a half-year loan deal, with an option to make the move permanent. He scored his first goal for the club in the 93rd minute of a 0–2 away win over Radomiak Radom on 13 May 2024, one day after Ruch's relegation to the I liga was confirmed.

On 19 June 2024, Vlkanova signed a four-year contract with Hradec Králové.

== International career ==
Vlkanova represented the Czech Republic U21s once in 2016. He was first called up to the senior Czech Republic national team for 2022–23 UEFA Nations League matches in June 2022. He made his debut on 9 June 2022 in a UEFA Nations League game against Portugal.

== Personal life ==
Vlkanova was attacked by an unknown assailant in September 2016 and suffered a broken cervical vertebrae, keeping him out from playing football for a month.
