= Petr Kodeš =

Czech footballer (born 1996)

Personal information
- Date of birth: 31 January 1996 (age 30)
- Place of birth: Krupka, Czech Republic
- Height: 1.85 m (6 ft 1 in)
- Positions: Defensive midfielder; centre-back

Team information
- Current team: Teplice
- Number: 16

Youth career
- Teplice

Senior career*
Years	Team	Apps	(Gls)
2015–2021	Teplice	55	(0)
2017	→ Viktoria Žižkov (loan)	15	(1)
2018–2019	→ Varnsdorf (loan)	22	(1)
2020–2021	→ Hradec Králové (loan)	18	(0)
2021–2025	Hradec Králové	126	(3)
2026–	Teplice	15	(0)

International career
2013–2014	Czech Republic U18	8	(0)
2016	Czech Republic U20	5	(0)
- * Club domestic league appearances and goals as of 27 May 2026

Petr Kodeš (born 31 January 1996) is a Czech professional footballer who plays as a midfielder or defender for Teplice.

== Life ==
Petr Kodeš was born in Krupka near Teplice. At the age of 17, he was nominated for the award for the best youth athlete in the Teplice region.

== Club career ==
Kodeš played for the youth teams of FK Teplice. He made his Czech First League debut for Teplice on 19 September 2015, at the age of 19, in their 4–3 away loss against Mladá Boleslav.

In October 2020, he went on loan to FC Hradec Králové in the Czech National Football League. He helped the club promote to the Czech First League and transferred there permanently after the 2020–21 season. Since then, he has played over 100 matches for Hradec Králové and is among the most notable players in the club's first league history. In February 2024, he became the club's captain.

On 14 January 2026, Kodeš signed a contract with Teplice.

== International career ==
Kodeš played for the U18 and U20 Czech Republic national teams.
