= Jaime Monroy =

Portuguese Football Manager

Personal information
- Full name: Jaime Filipe Monroy Zamith Piedade Pereira
- Date of birth: 19 March 1982 (age 44)
- Place of birth: Portugal

Team information
- Current team: Sigma Olomouc (manager)

Managerial career
- Years: Team
- 2004–2006: Salgueiros (youth)
- 2006–2008: Boavista (U15)
- 2013–2014: Baku (assistant)
- 2014–2015: Alcorcón (youth)
- 2015–2016: Barcelona (youth)
- 2016–2017: Sydney Olympic
- 2019–2020: Leeds United U23s
- 2020–2021: Leeds United (assistant)
- 2021: Xanthi
- 2022: Olympiacos (assistant)
- 2022–2023: West Bromwich Albion (assistant)
- 2024–2025: Hertha (assistant)
- 2026: Sigma Olomouc (assistant)
- 2026–: Sigma Olomouc

Jaime Filipe Monroy Zamith Piedade Pereira (born 19 March 1982) known as Jaime Monroy is a Portuguese professional football manager. He is currently the manager of Czech First League club Sigma Olomouc.

== Career ==
In 2013, Monroy was appointed assistant manager of Azerbaijani side Baku. In 2016, he was appointed manager of Sydney Olympic in Australia. In 2021, he was appointed manager of Greek second division club Xanthi.
