= Zdenko Frťala =

Slovak footballer and manager

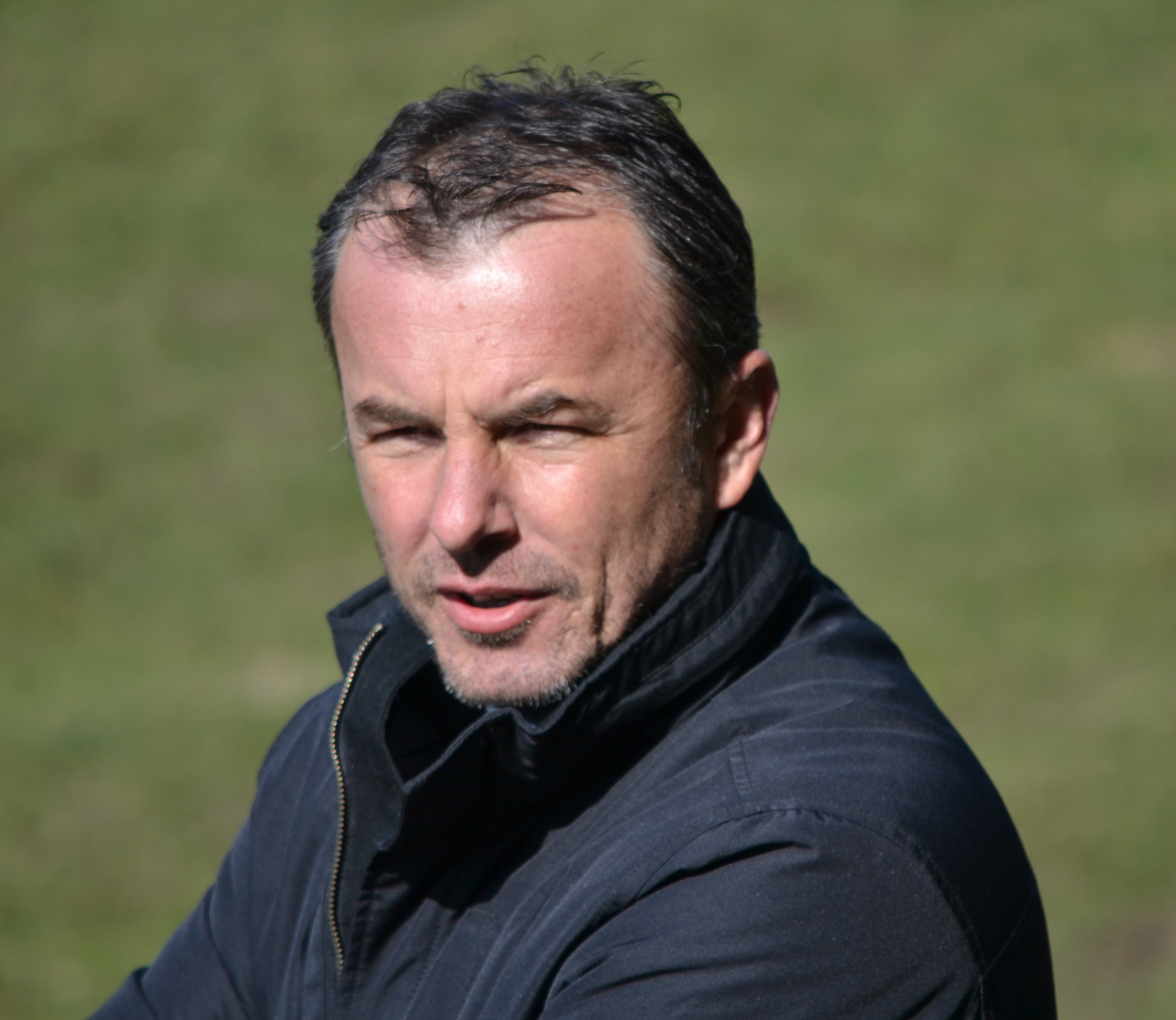
- Frťala in 2013

Personal information
- Date of birth: 3 August 1970 (age 56)
- Place of birth: Nitra, Czechoslovakia
- Height: 1.81 m (5 ft 11 in)
- Position: Defender

Senior career*
Years	Team	Apps	(Gls)
1987–1993	Spartak Trnava		
1993–1996	Slovan Bratislava		
1996–2003	Teplice	143	(1)

Managerial career
- 2003–2006: Chmel Blšany (assistant)
- 2006: Viktoria Plzeň (assistant)
- 2006–2008: Sparta Prague (assistant)
- 2008–2009: Ružomberok (assistant)
- 2010: Zenit Čáslav
- 2010–2011: Teplice (assistant)
- 2011–2015: Varnsdorf
- 2015: ŽP Šport Podbrezová
- 2015: Varnsdorf
- 2015–2016: Jablonec
- 2016–2018: Varnsdorf
- 2018–2021: Hradec Králové
- 2023–: Teplice
- * Club domestic league appearances and goals

Zdenko Frťala (born 3 August 1970) is a Slovak football manager and former player.

As a player, Frťala played in the Czechoslovak First League for Trnava and in the Czech First League for Teplice. He made a total of 192 top-flight appearances and scored 6 goals.

== Management career ==
After working mainly in assistant roles at clubs such as Blšany, Sparta Prague, Ružomberok and Teplice, Frťala was appointed manager of Czech 2. Liga side FK Varnsdorf in October 2011, replacing Aleš Křeček. Despite failing to win in his first six games, Varnsdorf celebrated their first win under Frťala against Třinec in the last match before the winter break of the 2011–12 Czech 2. Liga.

== Honours ==
=== Player ===
Spartak Trnava

- Czechoslovak Cup runner-up: 1990–91

FK Teplice

- Czech First League runner-up: 1998–99

=== Manager ===
FK Varnsdorf

- Czech National Football League runner-up: 2014–15

FK Jablonec

- Czech Cup runner-up: 2015–16

FC Hradec Králové

- Czech National Football League: 2020–21
