= Jan Jelínek =

Czech association football player (born 1982)

Personal information
- Date of birth: 22 March 1982 (age 44)
- Place of birth: Luhačovice, Czechoslovakia
- Height: 1.75 m (5 ft 9 in)
- Position: Defender

Team information
- Current team: Slovácko (coach)

Youth career
- Zlín

Senior career*
Years	Team	Apps	(Gls)
2005–2012	Zlín	95	(0)
2002	→ Kroměříž (loan)	?	(?)
2003	→ Luhačovice (loan)	?	(?)
2004	→ Pardubice (loan)	9	(?)
2007–2009	→ Opava (loan)	43	(2)

Managerial career
- 2013–2015: Zlín (assistant)
- 2015–2016: Luhačovice
- 2016–2021: Zlín B
- 2021–2022: Zlín
- 2022–2024: Zlín B
- 2024–2025: Mladá Boleslav (assistant)
- 2025–2026: Slavia B
- 2026–: Slovácko
- * Club domestic league appearances and goals

Jan Jelínek (born 22 March 1982) is a former Czech professional football player and manager, who was in lead of FC Trinity Zlín. His playing position is defender. He made his Czech First League debut for Zlín against Olomouc on 20 March 2005.

On 16 June 2026, Jelínek was appointed manager of Slovácko.

== Life ==
Jelínek was born in Luhačovice.
