= Roman Skuhravý =

Czech footballer and manager (born 1975)

Personal information
- Date of birth: 6 January 1975 (age 51)
- Place of birth: Czechoslovakia
- Height: 1.85 m (6 ft 1 in)
- Position: Defender

Team information
- Current team: Baník Ostrava (manager)

Senior career*
Years	Team	Apps	(Gls)
1993–2003	Jablonec	149	(10)
2000	→ Baník Ostrava (loan)	7	(0)
2003–2004	Viktoria Plzeň	16	(0)
Total		172	(10)

International career
1996–1997	Czech Republic U21	8	(1)

Managerial career
- 2013–2014: Baumit Jablonec
- 2014–2015: Dukla Prague (youth)
- 2015–2016: Varnsdorf
- 2016–2018: SFC Opava
- 2018–2021: Dukla Prague
- 2021–2024: Železiarne Podbrezová
- 2024–2025: Košice
- 2025–2026: Slovácko
- 2026–: Baník Ostrava
- * Club domestic league appearances and goals

Roman Skuhravý (born 6 January 1975) is a Czech football manager and former player. He played in the Czech First League as a defender for Jablonec, Baník Ostrava and Viktoria Plzeň.

Skuhravý played international football at under-21 level for Czech Republic U21.

== Managerial career ==
He took charge of Jablonec in May 2013. In the 2014–15 season, he led the older youth team of Dukla Prague. Skuhravý led second league side Opava to the final of the 2016–17 Czech Cup in his first season, and to promotion to the Czech First League in his second season. He returned to Dukla in September 2018, replacing Pavel Drsek as manager of the first team.

On 24 September 2024, Skuhravý signed a one-year contract with Slovak First Football League club Košice. After a poor run of results, it was announced on 2 October 2025 that Skuhravý would be leaving his position at Košice. On 18 November 2025, Skuhravý was appointed as manager of Slovácko. On 9 June 2026, Skuhravý was appointed as manager of Baník Ostrava.

== Personal life ==
His cousin Tomáš Skuhravý is a former international football player.

== Honours ==
=== Managerial ===
FK Jablonec

- Czech Cup: 2012–13
- Czech Supercup: 2013

SFC Opava

- Czech Cup runner-up: 2016–17
- Czech National Football League: 2017–18
