= Pavel Hoftych =

Czech footballer and manager (born 1967)

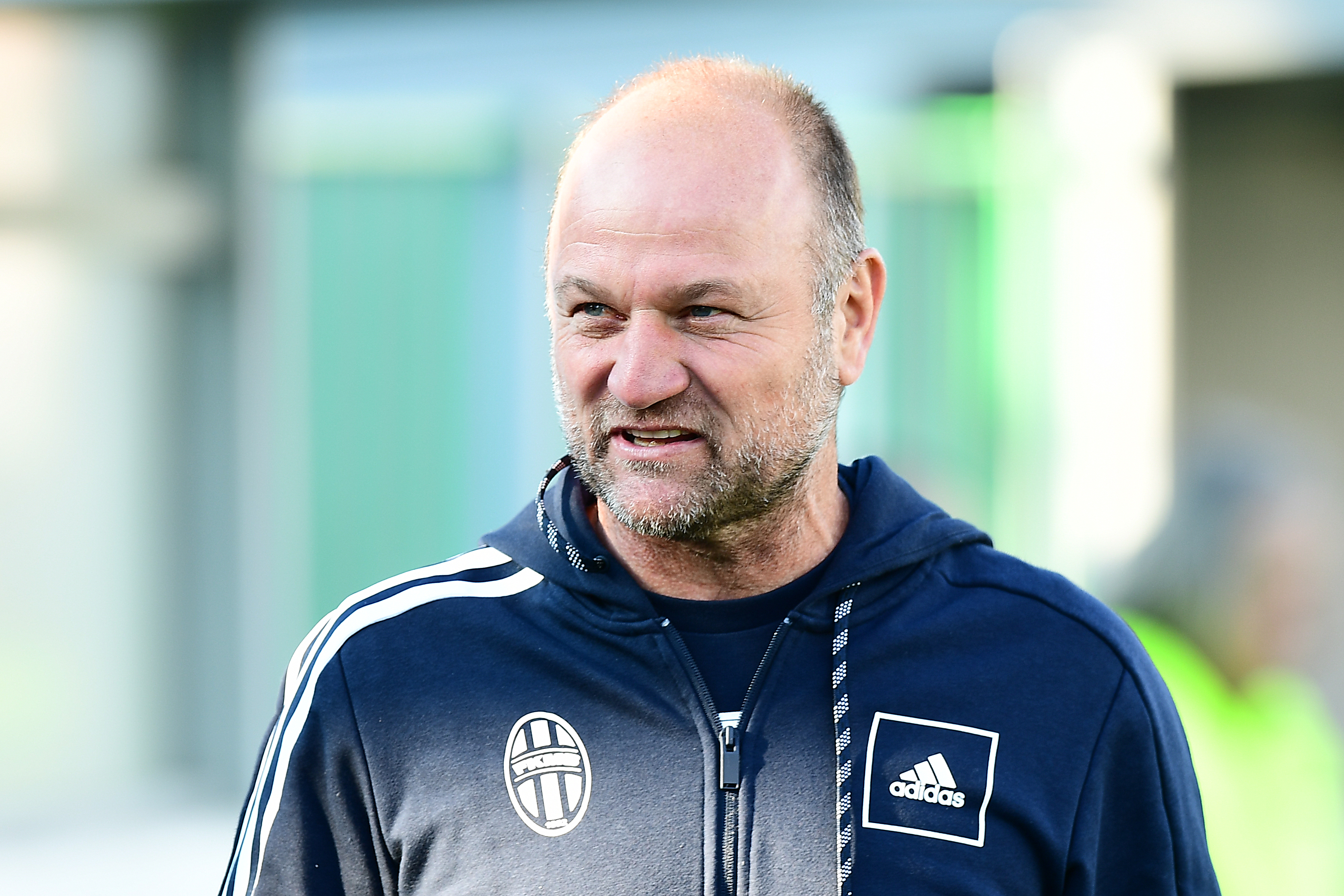

Personal information
- Full name: Pavel Hoftych
- Date of birth: 9 May 1967 (age 59)
- Place of birth: Ústí nad Labem, Czechoslovakia
- Position: Defender

Team information
- Current team: Zlín (sporting manager)

Youth career
- 1973–1983: FK Český Lev Neštěmice
- 1983–1986: Ústí nad Labem

Senior career*
Years	Team	Apps	(Gls)
1986–1988	VTJ Žatec		
1988–1989	Cheb	21	(2)
1989–1992	FC Slušovice		
1992–1995	Zlín	63	(1)
1995–1996	Příbram	13	(0)
1996–2000	ASK Klingenbach		
2000	Kroměříž		
2000–2002	Sokol Lůžkovice		

Managerial career
- 2006–2008: Zlín
- 2008–2011: Bohemians 1905
- 2011–2012: Spartak Trnava
- 2013: České Budějovice
- 2014: Czech Republic U19
- 2014–2015: Czech Republic U20
- 2015–2016: Czech Republic U18
- 2016–2018: Spartak Trnava (director of football)
- 2019–2021: Slovan Liberec
- 2022–2023: Mladá Boleslav
- 2023: Mladá Boleslav (sporting manager)
- 2024–2025: Viktoria Žižkov (sporting manager)
- 2025–: Zlín (sporting manager)
- 2026–: Zlín
- * Club domestic league appearances and goals

Pavel Hoftych (Czech pronunciation: [ˈpavɛl ˈɦoftɪx], born 9 May 1967) is a Czech football manager and former player. He played in the Czech First League for Zlín, scoring once in 63 league matches.

He signed a 2-year contract with Spartak Trnava in summer 2011, but resigned in November 2012.

== Honours ==
=== Managerial ===
FC Slovan Liberec

- Czech Cup runner-up: 2019–20
