= František Čech =

Czech footballer (born 1998)

Personal information
- Date of birth: 12 June 1998 (age 28)
- Height: 1.79 m (5 ft 10 in)
- Position: Defender

Team information
- Current team: Hradec Králové
- Number: 25

Senior career*
| Years | Team | Apps | (Gls) |
| 2017– | Hradec Králové | 152 | (3) |

International career^{‡}
| 2014 | Czech Republic U16 | 1 | (0) |
- * Club domestic league appearances and goals as of 27 May 2026 ‡ National team caps and goals as of 27 May 2017

František Čech (born 15 June 1998) is a Czech professional footballer who plays as a defender for Hradec Králové in the Czech First League.

He made his senior league debut for Hradec Králové on 13 May 2017 in their Czech First League 2–1 home win against Slovácko. He scored his first goal on 27 May in a 1–0 home win against Bohemians 1905.
