= Pavel Dvořák =

Czech footballer

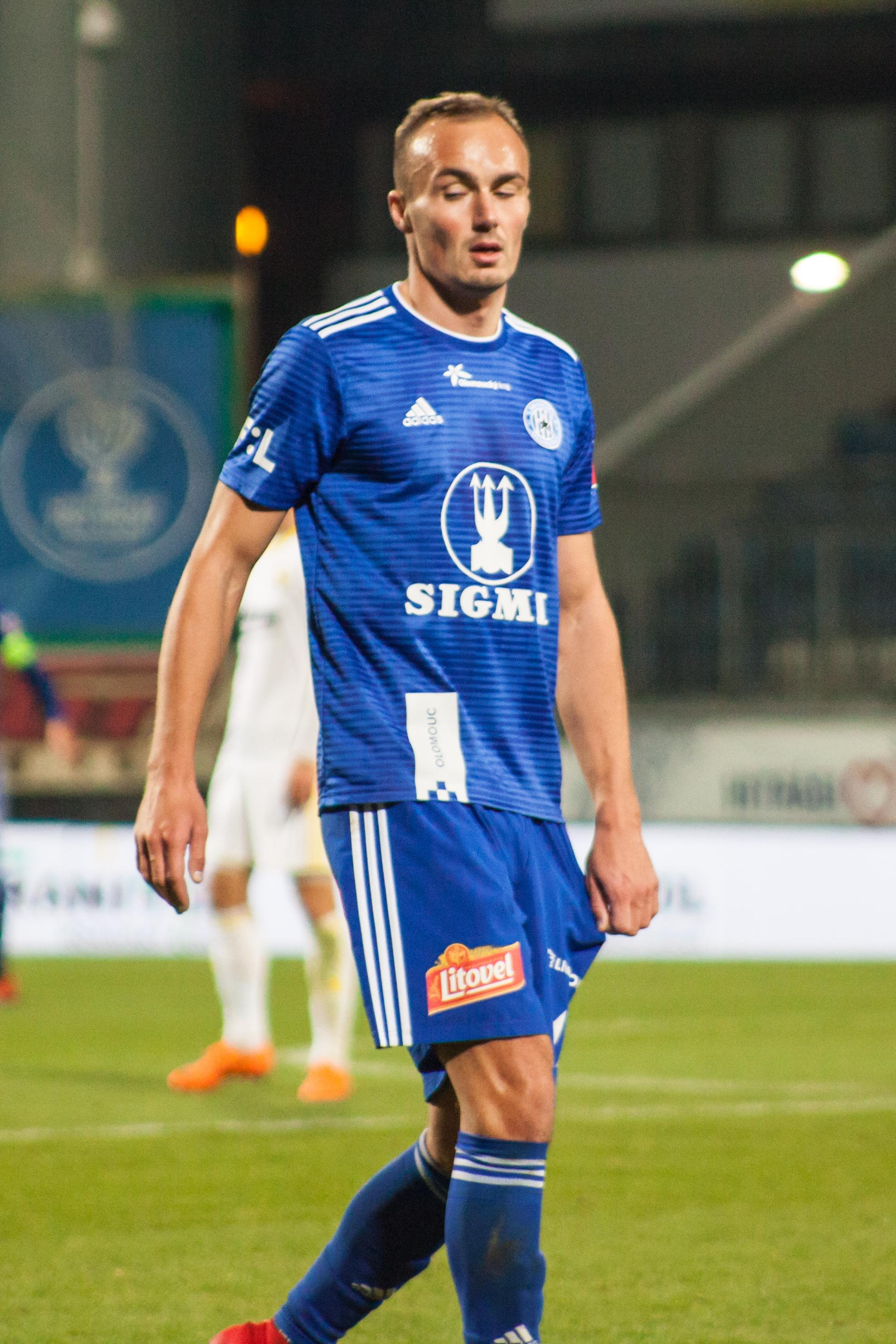

Personal information
- Full name: Pavel Dvořák
- Date of birth: 19 February 1989 (age 37)
- Place of birth: Vysoké Mýto, Czechoslovakia
- Height: 1.87 m (6 ft 2 in)
- Position: Forward

Team information
- Current team: FC Hradec Králové
- Number: 17

Youth career
- 1997–2001: SK Vysoké Mýto
- 2001: FK Česká Třebová
- 2002–2005: SK Vysoké Mýto
- 2005–2007: SK Vysoké Mýto

Senior career*
Years	Team	Apps	(Gls)
2007–2015	Hradec Králové	175	(44)
2015–2018	Vysočina Jihlava	83	(10)
2018–2020	Sigma Olomouc	24	(2)
2019–2020	→ Slovácko (loan)	17	(0)
2020–	Hradec Králové	62	(15)

International career
2007	Czech Republic U-18	2	(0)
2007–2008	Czech Republic U-19	9	(4)
- * Club domestic league appearances and goals as of 25 May 2023

Pavel Dvořák (born 19 February 1989) is a Czech football player who currently plays for FC Hradec Králové.
