= FC Hradec Králové =

- Full name: Football Club Hradec Králové a.s.
- Nickname: Votroci (The Rascals)
- Founded: 1905; 121 years ago
- Ground: Malšovická aréna
- Capacity: 9,300
- Chairman: Dominik Kohel
- Manager: David Horejš
- League: Czech First League
- 2025–26: 4th of 16
- Website: www.fchk.cz
Home colours	Away colours

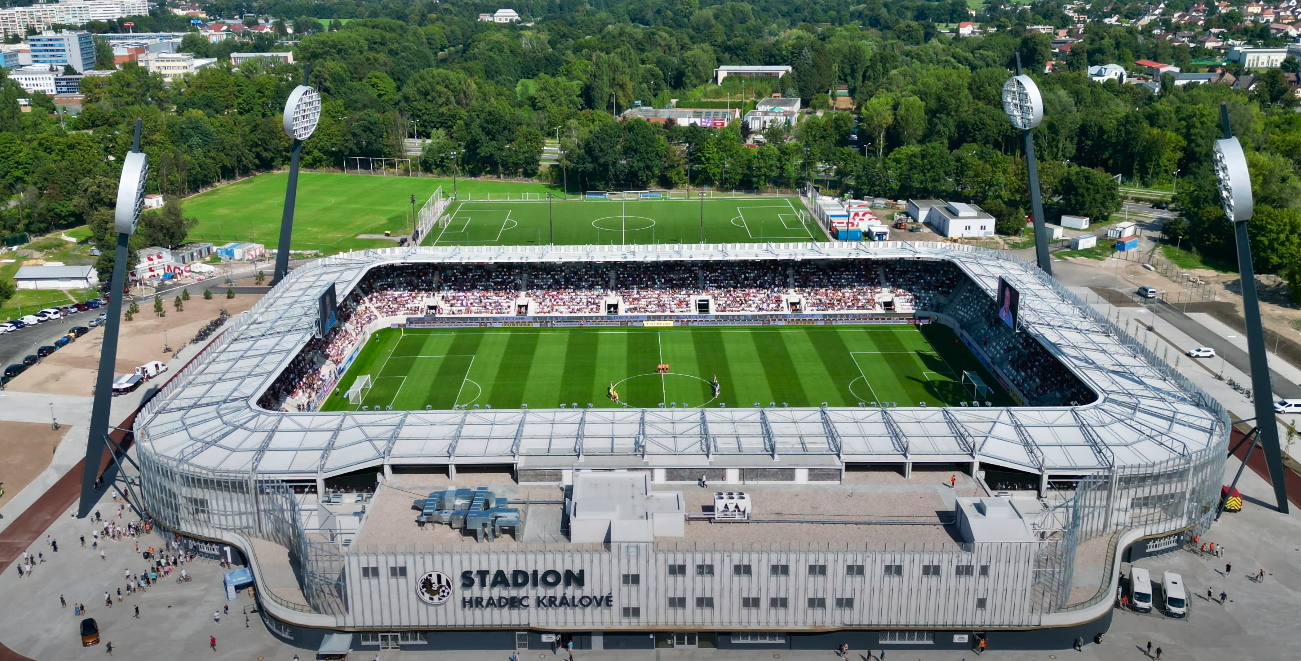
Malšovická aréna

FC Hradec Králové is a Czech professional football club based in the city of Hradec Králové. The club, which was founded in 1905, won the Czechoslovak First League in the 1959–60 season. Since 2021, the club has played in the Czech First League.

Following their domestic success, Hradec played in the 1960–61 European Cup and was eliminated by Barcelona in the quarter-finals, Barcelona eventually becoming runners-up. In 1995 Hradec won the Czech Cup and subsequently played in the Cup Winners' Cup, where it was eliminated in the round of 16 by Dynamo Moscow. In the 2002–03 season they were relegated to the Second Division. They returned to the top flight in 2009–10 only to be relegated once more in 2012–13; however they would place second in the 2. Liga signifying a return to the top division for the 2014–15 season. In the 2026–27 season, Hradec returned to European competition, defeating Tromsø in the Europa League before being eliminated by Beşiktaş. They subsequently entered the Conference League, where they were eliminated by Panathinaikos 4–3 on aggregate in the play-off round.

== History ==
Club logo until 2023

Hradec Králové first played in the Czechoslovak First League in 1956. They were relegated after two seasons, but returned for the 1959–60 season, winning the league that same season. They went on to compete in the 1960–61 European Cup, being eliminated by Barcelona in the quarter-finals, a team which would go on to reach the final.

Hradec Králové were again relegated in 1963. They enjoyed four more spells in the First League, each lasting only one or two seasons. Their last promotion to the Czechoslovak top tier came in 1990. Hradec then played in the newly formed Czech First League from its inception in 1993 until being relegated at the end of the 1999–00 season. Their best league finish in this time was 8th place, which they achieved in the 1998–99 season. The 1990s also saw the club triumph in the Czech Cup, winning the competition in 1995. This achievement saw the club qualify for the Cup Winners' Cup, where they were eliminated in the round of 16 by Dynamo Moscow.

The club returned to the top flight in 2001 after winning the Czech 2. Liga at the first attempt, securing promotion with four games to spare. After just two seasons though, the club again finished in the relegation places and were relegated back to the second tier. This time it was seven seasons before the club would achieve promotion, winning the 2009–10 Czech 2. Liga to secure their status in the top flight once more. Hradec equalled their best Czech First League finishing position of 8th in the 2010–11 season.

== Historical names ==
- 1905: SK Hradec Králové
- 1948: Sokol Hradec Králové
- 1949: Sokol Škoda
- 1953: DSO Spartak Hradec Králové (Dobrovolná Sportovní Organisace Spartak Hradec Králové)
- 1976: TJ Spartak ZVU Hradec
- 1989: RH Spartak ZVU Hradec Králové
- 1990: SKP Spartak Hradec Králové
- 1992: SKP Fomei Hradec Králové
- 1994: SK Hradec Králové
- 2005: FC Hradec Králové

== Players ==
=== Current squad ===
As of 8 September 2026.

Note: Flags indicate national team as defined under FIFA eligibility rules; some limited exceptions apply. Players may hold more than one non-FIFA nationality.

No.	Pos.	Nation	Player
1	GK	CZE	Patrik Vízek
2	DF	CZE	David Ludvíček
3	DF	SVK	Filip Mielke
4	DF	CZE	Tomáš Petrášek
5	DF	CZE	Filip Čihák
6	MF	ANG	Elione Fernandes Neto
7	DF	SVK	Jakub Uhrinčať
8	DF	CZE	Viktor Zentrich
9	MF	CZE	Matěj Valenta
10	FW	NED	Mick van Buren
11	MF	SVK	Samuel Dancák
12	GK	CZE	Adam Zadražil
16	MF	CZE	Vladimír Darida

No.	Pos.	Nation	Player
17	FW	CZE	Ondřej Mihálik
19	MF	CZE	Tom Slončík
20	GK	CZE	Matyáš Vágner
21	DF	CZE	Tomáš Wiesner
24	FW	NGR	Abdullahi Umar
25	DF	CZE	František Čech
26	DF	CZE	Daniel Horák
27	MF	CZE	Daniel Trubač
28	MF	CZE	Jakub Kučera
30	MF	SVK	Juraj Chvátal
33	DF	ESP	Ro Abajas
58	MF	CZE	Adam Vlkanova
70	FW	CZE	Tomáš Čvančara (on loan from Mönchengladbach)

=== Out on loan ===
Note: Flags indicate national team as defined under FIFA eligibility rules; some limited exceptions apply. Players may hold more than one non-FIFA nationality.

No.	Pos.	Nation	Player
—	FW	SVK	Adam Griger (at Slovan Bratislava)
—	FW	LAT	Marko Regža (at Nyíregyháza Spartacus)
—	FW	CZE	Lukáš Hruška (at Táborsko)
—	FW	CZE	Jakub Hodek (at Vlašim)
—	FW	BLR	German Barkovsky (at Polonia Warsaw)

No.	Pos.	Nation	Player
—	FW	CZE	Daniel Hais (at Kroměříž)
—	MF	CZE	Lucas Kubr (at Kroměříž)
—	FW	NGR	Ebuka Okeke (at Prostějov)
—	MF	CZE	Adam Binar (at Prostějov)

== Reserves ==
As of 2025–26, the club's reserve team FC Hradec Králové B plays in the Bohemian Football League (third tier of the Czech football system).

== Player records in the Czech First League ==
As of 18 September 2026.

Highlighted players are in the current squad.

=== Most appearances ===
#	Name	Matches
1	(Czech Republic) Pavel Černý sr.	162
2	(Czech Republic) Karel Podhajský	136
3	(Czech Republic) Pavel Dvořák	135
4	(Czech Republic) Petr Kodeš	126
5	(Czech Republic) Jakub Klíma	122
5	(Czech Republic) Jakub Kučera	122
7	(Czech Republic) Adam Vlkanova	120
8	(Czech Republic) Richard Jukl	117
8	(Czech Republic) David Zoubek	117
10	(Czech Republic) David Kalousek	112

=== Most goals ===
#	Name	Goals
1	(Czech Republic) Pavel Černý sr.	29
1	(Czech Republic) Pavel Dvořák	29
3	(Czech Republic) Richard Jukl	22
3	(Czech Republic) Adam Vlkanova	22
5	(Czech Republic) Daniel Vašulín	20
6	(Czech Republic) Václav Pilař	17
7	(Czech Republic) František Koubek	16
8	(Czech Republic) Jakub Kučera	13
9	(Czech Republic) David Breda	12
9	(Czech Republic) Filip Kubala	12
9	(Czech Republic) Ondřej Mihálik	12
9	(Czech Republic) Vladimír Darida	12

=== Most clean sheets ===
#	Name	Clean sheets
1	(Czech Republic) Karel Podhajský	44
2	(Czech Republic) Adam Zadražil	34
3	(Czech Republic) Jiří Lindr	18

== Managers ==
- Jiří Zástěra (1959–60)
- Oldřich Šubrt (1961–64)
- Josef "Pepi" Bican (1964)
- František Havránek (1964–66)
- Otto Hemele (1968–69)
- Zdeněk Krejčí (1971–73)
- Ladislav Moník (1977–78)
- Dušan Uhrin (1980–81)
- Zdeněk Krejčí (1985–86)
- Karol Dobiaš (1988)
- Ladislav Škorpil (1991–93)
- Štefan Nadzam (1993–94)
- Petr Pálka (1994–95)
- Luděk Zajíc (1995–96)
- Dušan Radolský (1996)
- Vladimír Táborský (1996–97)
- Jaroslav Hřebík (1997–98)
- Ladislav Škorpil (1998)
- Stanislav Kocourek (1999)
- Milan Petřík (1999)
- Petr Uličný (2000–03)
- Leoš Kalvoda (2003)
- Martin Pulpit (2004)
- Juraj Šimurka (2004–05)
- Oldřich Machala (July 2008 – March 2009)
- Václav Kotal (March 2009 – June 2012)
- Jiří Plíšek (July 2012 – April 2013)
- Luboš Prokopec (April 2013 – Oct 2014)
- Bohuslav Pilný (Oct 2014 – May 2017)
- Karel Havlíček (Jun 2017 – May 2018)
- Zdenko Frťala (Jun 2018 – Jun 2021)
- Miroslav Koubek (Jun 2021 – Jun 2023)
- Jozef Weber (Jun 2023 – Sept 2023)
- Václav Kotal (Sept 2023 – Feb 2024)
- David Horejš (Feb 2024 – present)

== History in domestic competitions ==
- 1984–87: 1. ČNL
- 1987–89: Czechoslovak First League
- 1989–90: 1. ČNL
- 1990–93: Czechoslovak First League
- 1993–00: Czech First League
- 2000–01: Czech 2. Liga
- 2001–03: Czech First League
- 2003–10: Czech 2. Liga
- 2010–13: Czech First League
- 2013–14: Czech 2. Liga
- 2014–15: Czech First League
- 2015–16: Czech 2. Liga
- 2016–17: Czech First League
- 2017–21 Czech 2. Liga
- 2021–22: Czech First League

- Seasons spent at Level 1 of the football league system: 21
- Seasons spent at Level 2 of the football league system: 14
- Seasons spent at Level 3 of the football league system: 0
- Seasons spent at Level 4 of the football league system: 0

=== Czechoslovakia ===
Season	League	Placed	Pld	W	D	L	GF	GA	GD	Pts	Cup
1990–91	1. liga	14th	30	10	7	13	33	52	–19	27	Round of 16
1991–92	1. liga	12th	30	7	8	15	22	39	–17	22	Round of 16
1992–93	1. liga	9th	30	10	7	13	32	36	–4	27	Round of 32

=== Czech Republic ===
Season	League	Placed	Pld	W	D	L	GF	GA	GD	Pts	Cup
1993–94	1. liga	13th	30	9	6	15	29	40	–11	33	Round of 16
1994–95	1. liga	12th	30	10	6	14	35	45	–10	36	Winners
1995–96	1. liga	14th	30	8	5	17	28	46	–18	29	Round of 32
1996–97	1. liga	14th	30	5	13	12	22	39	–17	28	Round of 64
1997–98	1. liga	11th	30	8	10	12	25	36	–11	34	Round of 64
1998–99	1. liga	8th	30	11	6	13	33	40	–7	39	Round of 64
1999–00	1. liga	16th	30	4	11	15	21	38	–17	23	Round of 16
2000–01	2. liga	1st	30	19	9	2	55	28	+27	66	Round of 64
2001–02	1. liga	12th	30	9	8	13	28	42	–14	35	Round of 16
2002–03	1. liga	16th	30	3	13	14	23	54	–21	22	Round of 32
2003–04	2. liga	7th	30	9	12	9	27	30	–3	39	Round of 32
2004–05	2. liga	7th	28	9	7	12	37	38	–1	34	Round of 32
2005–06	2. liga	4th	30	13	10	7	31	28	+3	49	Semi-finals
2006–07	2. liga	7th	30	11	10	9	41	34	+7	43	Round of 16
2007–08	2. liga	4th	30	13	11	6	34	24	+10	50	Round of 32
2008–09	2. liga	13th	30	7	14	9	36	32	+4	35	Round of 16
2009–10	2. liga	1st	30	20	8	2	47	18	+29	68	Round of 16
2010–11	1. liga	8th	30	11	8	11	26	36	–10	41	Round of 64
2011–12	1. liga	13th	30	8	7	15	22	38	–16	31	Round of 32
2012–13	1. liga	16th	30	5	10	15	27	44	–17	25	Round of 16
2013–14	2. liga	2nd	30	18	7	5	54	27	+27	61	Round of 32
2014–15	1. liga	15th	30	6	7	17	26	52	–26	25	Round of 16
2015–16	2. liga	2nd	28	17	8	3	45	16	+29	59	Quarter-finals
2016–17	1. liga	15th	30	8	3	19	29	51	–22	27	Round of 16
2017–18	2. liga	4th	30	14	8	8	50	36	+14	50	Quarter-finals
2018–19	2. liga	4th	30	15	8	7	36	18	+18	53	Round of 64
2019–20	2. liga	4th	30	15	9	6	54	29	+25	54	Round of 32
2020–21	2. liga	1st	26	17	7	2	51	22	+29	58	Round of 16
2021–22	1. liga	6th	35	10	14	11	44	50	–6	44	Semi-finals
2022–23	1. liga	8th	34	13	6	15	39	46	–7	45	Round of 32
2023–24	1. liga	7th	35	13	10	12	42	43	–1	49	Round of 16
2024–25	1. liga	7th	34	14	7	13	40	32	+8	49	Round of 16
2025–26	1. liga	4th	35	16	8	11	50	41	+9	56	Quarter-finals

== History in European competitions ==
Season	Competition	Round	Country	Club	Score
1960–61	European Cup	Q	(Romania)	Steaua Bucharest	walkover
		1/8	(Greece)	Panathinaikos	1–0, 0–0
		1/4	(Spain)	Barcelona	0–4, 1–1
1995–96	UEFA Cup Winners' Cup	Q	(Liechtenstein)	Vaduz	5–0, 9–1
		1/8	(Denmark)	Copenhagen	5–0, 2–2
		1/4	(Russia)	Dynamo Moscow	0–1, 1–0
2026–27	UEFA Europa League	2QR	(Norway)	Tromsø IL	1–0, 3–1
		3QR	(Turkey)	Beşiktaş	0–1, 0–1
	UEFA Conference League	PO	(Greece)	Panathinaikos	1–1, 1–2

== Honours ==
- Czechoslovak First League (tier-I)
  - Champions: 1959–60
- Czech Cup
  - Winners: 1994–95
- Czech National Football League (formerly 2. liga; tier-II)
  - Winners: 2000–01, 2009–10, 2020–21

== Club records ==
=== Czech First League records ===
- Best position: 4th (2025–26)
- Worst position: 16th (1999–2000, 2002–03)
- Biggest home win: Hradec Králové 5–0 Benešov (1994–95), Hradec Králové 5–0 Sigma Olomouc (2026–27)
- Biggest away win: Slovácko 1–5 Hradec Králové (2024–25)
- Biggest home defeat: Hradec Králové 0–5 Sparta (2001–02)
- Biggest away defeat: Jablonec 7–0 Hradec Králové (2010–11)
