= Czech First League =

Chance Liga
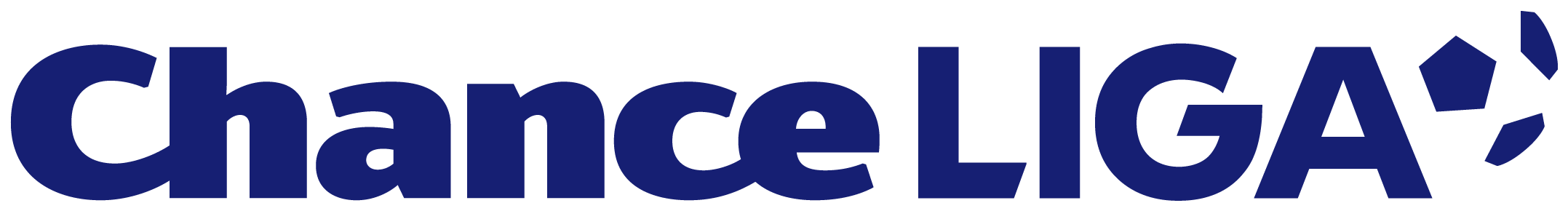
- Organising body: Czech Football League Association
- Founded: 1993; 33 years ago
- Country: Czech Republic
- Confederation: UEFA
- Number of clubs: 16
- Level on pyramid: 1
- Relegation to: Czech National Football League
- Domestic cup: Czech Cup
- International cup(s): UEFA Champions League; UEFA Europa League; UEFA Conference League
- Current champions: Slavia Prague (9th title) (2025–26)
- Most championships: Sparta Prague (14 titles)
- Top scorer: David Lafata (198 goals)
- Website: en.chanceliga.cz
- Current: 2026–27 Czech First League

The Czech First League (Czech: 1. česká fotbalová liga), also known as the Chance Liga for sponsorship reasons, is a professional association football league in the Czech Republic and the highest level of the Czech Republic football league system. Seasons typically run from August to May, most games are played on Saturdays and Sundays with few games played on Fridays. All Chance Liga clubs qualify for the Czech Cup.

The history of the Czech football league began with its reorganization for the 1993–94 season following the dissolution of Czechoslovakia and therefore the league became the successor of the Czechoslovak League. Thirty-five clubs have competed in the Czech First League since its founding. Sparta Prague has won the title 14 times, the most among Czech clubs. Other clubs that were crowned as champions are Slavia Prague, Slovan Liberec, Baník Ostrava and Viktoria Plzeň.

Based on performances in European competitions over the past five years, the league is ranked 10th in the UEFA league rankings for the 2024–25 season.

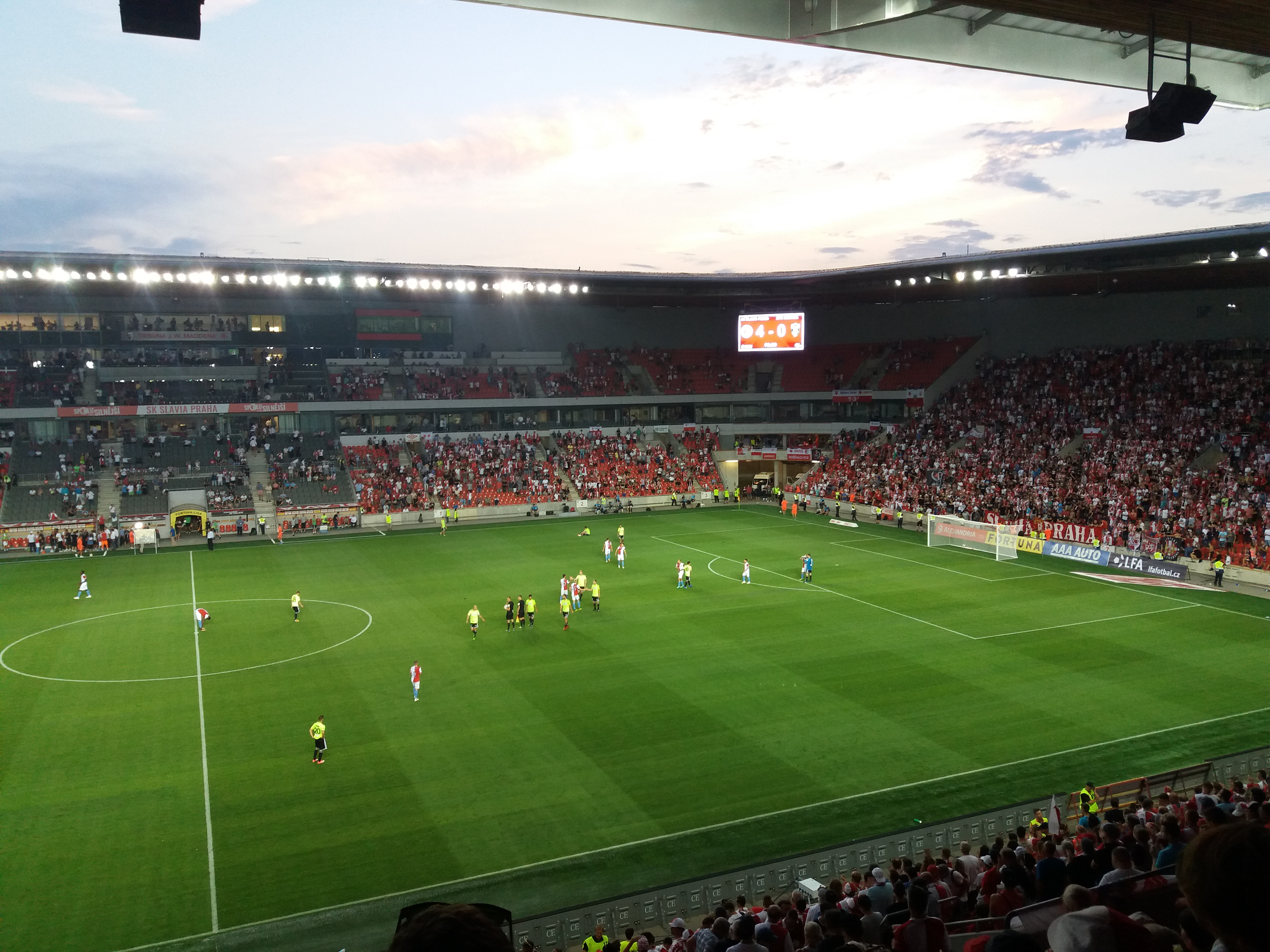
A league match between SK Slavia Prague and MFK Karviná

== Competition format ==
In the inaugural season, two points were awarded for a win, before switching to three points for a win in 1994. Teams are ranked by total points, in the case of two or more teams finishing with equal points, the head-to-head record between the teams is used for ranking, counting points in relevant games, then goal difference and then goals scored.

=== 1993–2018 ===
There were 16 clubs in the league. During the course of a season, which lasted from August to May, each club played the others twice, once at their home stadium and once at that of their opponents, for a total of 30 games.

=== New format ===
The 2018–19 season was the first season played with the new competition format. After the regular season, which lasts from July to April and involves each team playing every other team home and away, the teams are divided into three groups. The top six teams enter the championship group, with the first-placed team being named champions. The teams play against each other only once, playing total of five additional matches. Points earned are added to the points from the regular season.

The teams 7th–10th position after 30 games take part in the Europa League play-offs. The best of them play against the fourth-placed or fifth-placed (it depends on the result of the Czech Cup and on the Czech coefficient rankings between European football leagues) of the championship group to determine who will participate in the Europa League.

The teams from 11th to 16th position play in the same format as the championship group. The team finishing in 16th position is relegated directly to the Czech National Football League, while teams in 15th and 14th places play relegation play-offs against teams finishing 2nd and 3rd in the Czech National Football League.

==== Changes in 2020–21 ====
Due to positive tests for COVID-19 in the 2019–20 season, the relegation group was abandoned. The league announced that due to time pressure the relegation group would remain unfinished and as a consequence, no team could be relegated. As the winner of the second league should be promoted, and to avoid playing the 2020–21 season with an odd number of teams, automatic promotion was granted to the second placed team as well. There were 18 clubs in the league, each club played the others twice, once at their home stadium and once at that of their opponents, for a total of 34 games. The three lowest placed teams were relegated to the second tier (Czech National Football League). From the 2021–22 season, the system returned to its previous format.

== Champions ==
=== Year by year ===
Season	Champions	Runners-up	Third place	Top goalscorer(s) (goals)	Club(s)
1993–94	Sparta Prague (1)	Slavia Prague	Baník Ostrava	(Czech Republic) Horst Siegl (20)	Sparta Prague
1994–95	Sparta Prague (2)	Slavia Prague	Boby Brno	(Czech Republic) Radek Drulák (15)	Drnovice
1995–96	Slavia Prague (1)	Sigma Olomouc	Jablonec	(Czech Republic) Radek Drulák (22)	Drnovice
1996–97	Sparta Prague (3)	Slavia Prague	Jablonec	(Czech Republic) Horst Siegl (19)	Sparta Prague
1997–98	Sparta Prague (4)	Slavia Prague	Sigma Olomouc	(Czech Republic) Horst Siegl (13)	Sparta Prague
1998–99	Sparta Prague (5)	Teplice	Slavia Prague	(Czech Republic) Horst Siegl (18)	Sparta Prague
1999–00	Sparta Prague (6)	Slavia Prague	Drnovice	(Czech Republic) Vratislav Lokvenc (22)	Sparta Prague
2000–01	Sparta Prague (7)	Slavia Prague	Sigma Olomouc	(Czech Republic) Vítězslav Tuma (15)	Drnovice
2001–02	Slovan Liberec (1)	Sparta Prague	Viktoria Žižkov	(Czech Republic) Jiří Štajner (15)	Slovan Liberec
2002–03	Sparta Prague (8)	Slavia Prague	Viktoria Žižkov	(Czech Republic) Jiří Kowalík (16)	1. FC Synot
2003–04	Baník Ostrava (1)	Sparta Prague	Sigma Olomouc	(Czech Republic) Marek Heinz (19)	Baník Ostrava
2004–05	Sparta Prague (9)	Slavia Prague	Teplice	(Czech Republic) Tomáš Jun (14)	Sparta Prague
2005–06	Slovan Liberec (2)	Mladá Boleslav	Slavia Prague	(Slovakia) Milan Ivana (11)	Slovácko
2006–07	Sparta Prague (10)	Slavia Prague	Mladá Boleslav	(Czech Republic) Luboš Pecka (16)	Mladá Boleslav
2007–08	Slavia Prague (2)	Sparta Prague	Baník Ostrava	(Czech Republic) Václav Svěrkoš (15)	Baník Ostrava
2008–09	Slavia Prague (3)	Sparta Prague	Slovan Liberec	(Croatia) Andrej Kerić (15)	Slovan Liberec
2009–10	Sparta Prague (11)	Jablonec	Baník Ostrava	(Czech Republic) Michal Ordoš (12)	Sigma Olomouc
2010–11	Viktoria Plzeň (1)	Sparta Prague	Jablonec	(Czech Republic) David Lafata (19)	Jablonec
2011–12	Slovan Liberec (3)	Sparta Prague	Viktoria Plzeň	(Czech Republic) David Lafata (25)	Jablonec
2012–13	Viktoria Plzeň (2)	Sparta Prague	Slovan Liberec	(Czech Republic) David Lafata (20)	Jablonec / Sparta Prague
2013–14	Sparta Prague (12)	Viktoria Plzeň	Mladá Boleslav	(Czech Republic) Josef Hušbauer (18)	Sparta Prague
2014–15	Viktoria Plzeň (3)	Sparta Prague	Jablonec	(Czech Republic) David Lafata (20)	Sparta Prague
2015–16	Viktoria Plzeň (4)	Sparta Prague	Slovan Liberec	(Czech Republic) David Lafata (20)	Sparta Prague
2016–17	Slavia Prague (4)	Viktoria Plzeň	Sparta Prague	(Czech Republic) Milan Škoda / (Czech Republic) David Lafata (15)	Slavia Prague / Sparta Prague
2017–18	Viktoria Plzeň (5)	Slavia Prague	Jablonec	(Czech Republic) Michael Krmenčík (16)	Viktoria Plzeň
2018–19	Slavia Prague (5)	Viktoria Plzeň	Sparta Prague	(Russia) Nikolay Komlichenko (29)	Mladá Boleslav
2019–20	Slavia Prague (6)	Viktoria Plzeň	Sparta Prague	(Czech Republic) Libor Kozák / (Croatia) Petar Musa (14)	Sparta Prague / Slavia Prague
2020–21	Slavia Prague (7)	Sparta Prague	Jablonec	(Czech Republic) Jan Kuchta / (Czech Republic) Adam Hložek (15)	Slavia Prague / Sparta Prague
2021–22	Viktoria Plzeň (6)	Slavia Prague	Sparta Prague	(France) Jean-David Beauguel (19)	Viktoria Plzeň
2022–23	Sparta Prague (13)	Slavia Prague	Viktoria Plzeň	(Czech Republic) Václav Jurečka (20)	Slavia Prague
2023–24	Sparta Prague (14)	Slavia Prague	Viktoria Plzeň	(Czech Republic) Václav Jurečka (19)	Slavia Prague
2024–25	Slavia Prague (8)	Viktoria Plzeň	Baník Ostrava	(Czech Republic) Jan Kliment (18)	Sigma Olomouc
2025–26	Slavia Prague (9)	Sparta Prague	Viktoria Plzeň	(Czech Republic) Tomáš Chorý (17)	Slavia Prague

=== Performance by club ===
Club	Winners	Runners-up	Winning years
Sparta Prague	14	11	1993–94, 1994–95, 1996–97, 1997–98, 1998–99, 1999–00, 2000–01, 2002–03, 2004–05, 2006–07, 2009–10, 2013–14, 2022–23, 2023–24
Slavia Prague	9	13	1995–96, 2007–08, 2008–09, 2016–17, 2018–19, 2019–20, 2020–21, 2024–25, 2025–26
Viktoria Plzeň	6	5	2010–11, 2012–13, 2014–15, 2015–16, 2017–18, 2021–22
Slovan Liberec	3	0	2001–02, 2005–06, 2011–12
Baník Ostrava	1	0	2003–04
Sigma Olomouc	0	1	
Teplice	0	1	
Mladá Boleslav	0	1	
Jablonec	0	1	

== Participating teams in 2026–27 ==
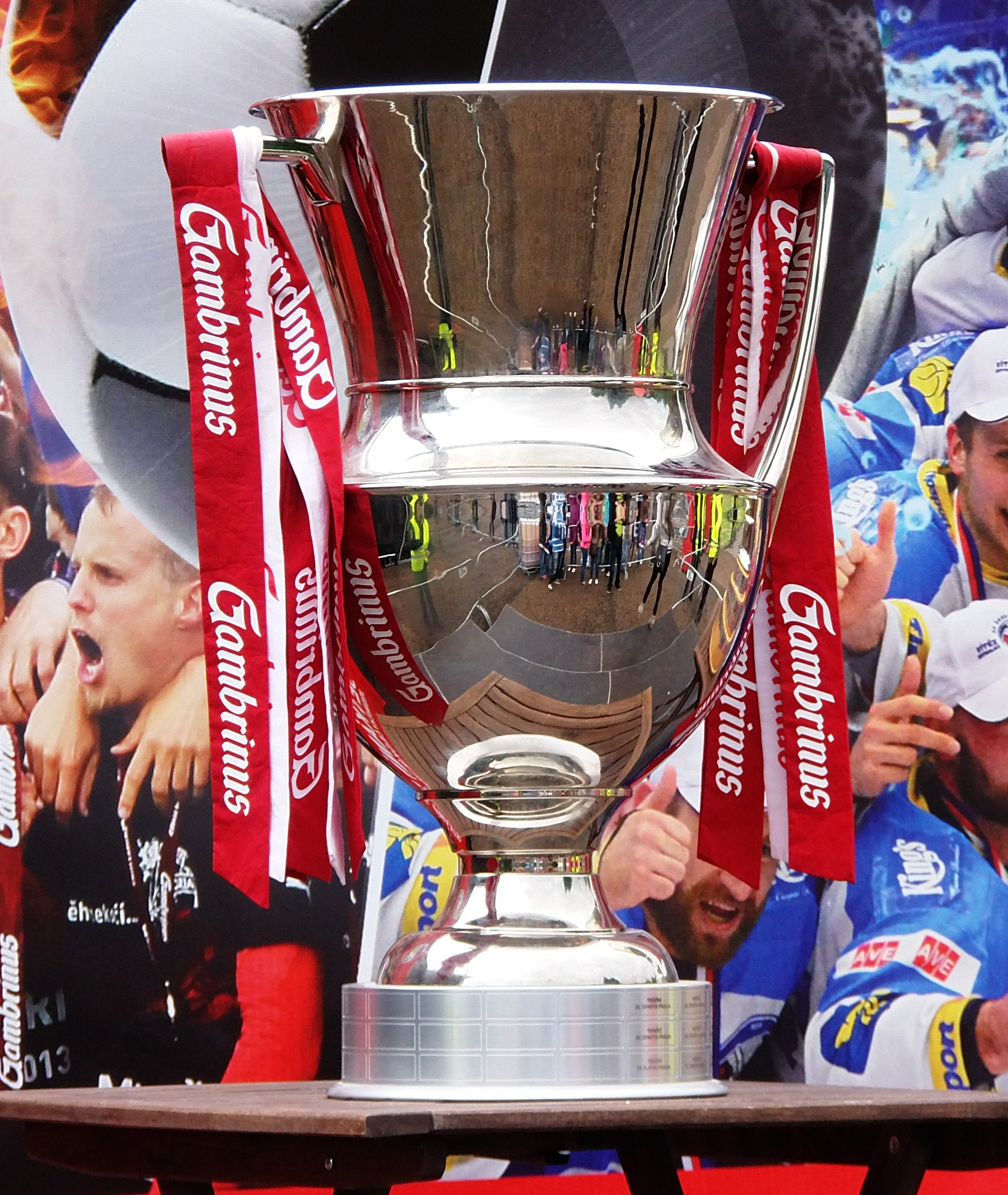
Czech First League trophy (2013)

=== Map ===
Locations of the 2026–27 Czech First League teams

=== 2026–27 season ===
The following 16 clubs are competing in the 2026–27 Czech First League.

Team	Location	Stadium	Capacity	Ref.
SK Artis Brno	Brno	Městský fotbalový stadion Srbská	10,785	
Bohemians 1905	Prague	Ďolíček	6,300	
FC Hradec Králové	Hradec Králové	Malšovická aréna	9,300	
FK Jablonec	Jablonec nad Nisou	Stadion Střelnice	5,690	
FC Slovan Liberec	Liberec	Stadion u Nisy	9,900	
FK Mladá Boleslav	Mladá Boleslav	Lokotrans Aréna	5,000	
SK Sigma Olomouc	Olomouc	Andrův stadion	12,474	
FC Baník Ostrava	Ostrava	Městský stadion (Ostrava)	15,081	
FK Pardubice	Pardubice	CFIG Arena	4,620	
FC Viktoria Plzeň	Plzeň	Doosan Arena	11,597	
SK Slavia Prague	Prague	Fortuna Arena	19,370	
1. FC Slovácko	Uherské Hradiště	Městský fotbalový stadion Miroslava Valenty	8,000	
AC Sparta Prague	Prague	epet ARENA	18,349	
FK Teplice	Teplice	Na Stínadlech	17,078	
FC Zbrojovka Brno	Brno	Městský fotbalový stadion Srbská	10,785	
FC Zlín	Zlín	Letná Stadion (Zlín)	5,898	

=== Managers ===
As of 12 November 2026.

Club	Coach	Appointed
Slavia Prague	(Czech Republic) Jindřich Trpišovský	22 December 2017
Viktoria Plzeň	(Czech Republic) Radoslav Kováč	23 August 2026
Baník Ostrava	(Czech Republic) Roman Skuhravý	10 June 2026
Sparta Prague	(Denmark) Brian Priske	8 June 2025
Jablonec	(Czech Republic) Luboš Kozel	17 June 2024
Sigma Olomouc	(Portugal) Jaime Monroy	12 November 2026
Hradec Králové	(Czech Republic) David Horejš	28 February 2024
Bohemians 1905	(Czech Republic) Jaroslav Veselý	21 March 2022
Slovan Liberec	(Slovakia) Branislav Fodrek	18 June 2026
Teplice	(Slovakia) Zdenko Frťala	6 March 2023
Mladá Boleslav	(Czech Republic) Aleš Majer	2 June 2025
Slovácko	(Czech Republic) Jan Jelínek	16 June 2026
Pardubice	(Czech Republic) Jan Trousil	14 October 2025
Zlín	(Czech Republic) Pavel Hoftych	7 September 2026
Zbrojovka Brno	(Football Association of the Czech Republic) Martin Svědík	12 April 2025
Artis Brno	(Czech Republic) Roman Nádvorník	23 March 2026

== Sponsorship ==
FORTUNA:LIGA (2016–2024)

In 1997 the league started a sponsorship deal with Pilsner Urquell Brewery and became known as the Gambrinus liga (after the company's Gambrinus beer). In 2008, the sponsorship was extended until the end of the 2013–14 season.

In May 2014, the league announced a four-year sponsorship deal with betting firm Synot, becoming the Synot liga. However, in January 2016 the company announced that their deal would conclude at the end of the 2015–16 season.

In July 2016 a new two-year sponsorship deal was announced, with the league partnering ePojisteni.cz, an online insurance company. The league subsequently became known as the ePojisteni.cz liga. Due to a government subsidy scandal and the arrest of FAČR chairman Miroslav Pelta, ePojisteni.cz terminated the contract prematurely in May 2017. The league was then renamed HET liga for the 2017–18 season, after paint manufacturer HET.

In October 2016, FAČR, League Football Association and Czech betting company Fortuna signed a 6-year partnership deal. In accordance with this deal, the Czech First League will be called Fortuna liga from the 2018–19 season.

In April 2024, a new partnership deal was announced with the betting company Chance. In accordance with this deal, the Czech First League will be called Chance Liga from the 2024–25 season.

== All time table ==
After the 2025–26 season.

The table counts all the seasons since the Czech First League was founded in 1993. Highlighted teams will be competing in the 2026–27 Czech First League.

Pos	Team	S	Pld	W	D	L	GF	GA	GD	Pts	Level (2026–27)
1	AC Sparta Prague	33	1029	644	214	171	1960	881	+1079	2128	1st tier
2	SK Slavia Prague	33	1029	582	254	193	1832	908	+924	1984	1st tier
3	FC Viktoria Plzeň	29	909	454	211	244	1431	989	+442	1561	1st tier
4	FC Slovan Liberec	33	1020	428	281	311	1370	1131	+239	1554	1st tier
5	FK Jablonec	32	999	392	280	327	1353	1193	+160	1401	1st tier
6	SK Sigma Olomouc	31	959	362	267	330	1231	1139	+92	1339	1st tier
7	FC Baník Ostrava	32	1000	352	282	366	1321	1271	+50	1324	1st tier
8	FK Teplice	30	933	326	266	341	1140	1183	−43	1244	1st tier
9	FK Mladá Boleslav	22	696	271	184	241	1031	940	+91	997	1st tier
10	1. FC Slovácko	24	756	254	199	303	868	970	−102	961	1st tier
11	FC Zbrojovka Brno	26	789	255	206	328	914	1069	−155	961	1st tier
12	Bohemians 1905	24	754	216	213	325	781	1043	−262	853	1st tier
13	SK Dynamo České Budějovice	24	740	200	196	344	768	1160	−392	785	3rd tier
14	FK Příbram	22	672	191	172	309	697	986	−289	745	2nd tier
15	FC Zlín	20	631	173	172	286	637	915	−278	681	1st tier
16	FC Hradec Králové	19	593	171	158	264	589	815	−226	662	1st tier
17	FK Viktoria Žižkov	14	420	144	106	170	478	539	−61	526	2nd tier
18	FK Drnovice	10	300	114	67	119	392	398	−6	396	Dissolved in 2006
19	FK Dukla Prague (Note: Includes 1993–94 season played by the original Dukla Prague club.)	11	345	90	97	158	382	526	−144	366	2nd tier
20	SFC Opava	11	342	83	89	170	347	532	−185	338	2nd tier
21	MFK Karviná	9	298	74	74	150	334	485	−151	296	2nd tier
22	FK Chmel Blšany	8	240	67	63	110	255	350	−95	264	Dissolved in 2016
23	FK Pardubice	6	206	64	43	99	227	326	−99	235	1st tier
24	FC Vysočina Jihlava	7	210	55	61	94	221	315	−94	226	2nd tier
25	SK Kladno	4	120	28	30	62	99	173	−74	114	2nd tier
26	FC Union Cheb	3	90	29	26	35	95	121	−26	100	4th tier
27	FK SIAD Most	3	90	19	30	41	96	140	−44	87	Dissolved in 2016
28	FK Bohemians Prague	2	60	14	8	38	60	111	−51	50	Dissolved in 2016
29	FC Karviná	2	60	12	12	36	53	105	−52	48	Merged with MFK Karviná in 2008
30	1. SC Znojmo FK	1	30	6	9	15	32	49	−17	27	4th tier
31	FK Ústí nad Labem	1	30	4	7	19	22	67	−45	19	2nd tier
32	Slovácká Slavia Uherské Hradiště	1	30	3	8	19	19	65	−46	17	Merged with Slovácko in 2000
33	MFK Vítkovice	1	30	3	7	20	22	64	−42	13	3rd tier
34	FK Švarc Benešov	1	30	3	3	24	23	78	−55	12	3rd tier
35	AFK Atlantic Lázně Bohdaneč	1	30	2	5	23	18	61	−43	11	Dissolved in 2000
36	SK Artis Brno	0	0	0	0	0	0	0	0	0	1st tier

- Point deductions are not counted in this historical table (2004–05: 1. FC Slovácko −12, SFC Opava −6, Slovan Liberec −6; 2009–10: FK Bohemians Prague −15; 2011–12: Sigma Olomouc −9).
- A win was awarded with 2 points in the 1993–94 season.

== Statistics ==
=== UEFA coefficients ===
The following data indicates Czech coefficient rankings between European football leagues.

View chart definition.

UEFA Country ranking
As of 25 May 2026.

- 8th (8) (Belgium) Belgian Pro League (62.250)
- 9th (10) (Turkey) Süper Lig (51.875)
- 10th (9) (Czech Republic) Czech First League (48.525)
- 11th (12) Super League Greece (48.412)
- 12th (15) (Poland) Ekstraklasa (46.750)

UEFA Club ranking
As of 25 May 2026.

- 51th ▲ Viktoria Plzeň (50.250)
- 59th ▼ Slavia Prague (44.000)
- 64th ▲ Sparta Prague (38.250)

=== Attendance ===
Season	Total	Average	Highest	Home Av.	Club
1993–94	1,116,885	4,663	23,111	9,501	Brno
1994–95	1,380,060	5,750	34,770	20,523	Brno
1995–96	1,225,755	5,129	26,872	12,283	Brno
1996–97	1,710,045	7,155	44,120	21,659	Brno
1997–98	1,477,515	6,156	31,730	15,365	Brno
1998–99	1,447,875	6,033	24,400	13,207	Brno
1999–00	1,433,355	5,972	23,800	11,280	Opava
2000–01	1,091,882	4,549	16,350	7,718	Olomouc
2001–02	1,113,325	4,722	16,300	7,490	Ostrava
2002–03	935,927	3,899	18,228	6,175	Sparta Prague
2003–04	1,158,523	4,827	20,032	15,376	Ostrava
2004–05	921,658	3,840	15,419	8,028	Ostrava
2005–06	980,633	4,085	20,318	7,211	Sparta Prague
2006–07	1,173,869	4,891	20,565	11,848	Sparta Prague
2007–08	1,237,660	5,156	20,698	11,022	Ostrava
2008–09	1,119,410	4,664	20,500	11,971	Slavia Prague
2009–10	1,177,014	4,924	19,370	10,766	Sparta Prague
2010–11	1,073,690	4,473	18,873	8,665	Sparta Prague
2011–12	1,130,540	4,710	18,299	10,322	Sparta Prague
2012–13	1,151,464	4,797	19,410	10,046	Plzeň
2013–14	1,216,389	5,068	19,089	11,340	Sparta Prague
2014–15	1,137,131	4,738	18,665	10,868	Plzeň
2015–16	1,219,366	5,080	18,684	10,618	Plzeň
2016–17	1,172,619	4,886	19,084	11,625	Slavia Prague
2017–18	1,331,016	5,546	19,084	12,431	Slavia Prague
2018–19	1,533,390	5,536	19,370	13,456	Slavia Prague
2019–20	1,153,357	4,470	19,370	10,851	Slavia Prague
2020–21	165,502	600	9,285	3,709	Slavia Prague
2021–22	1,055,806	3,825	19,370	10,989	Slavia Prague
2022–23	1,535,500	5,563	19,370	14,729	Slavia Prague
2023–24	1,782,387	6,435	19,370	17,688	Slavia Prague
2024–25	1,704,832	6,177	19,370	18,306	Slavia Prague
2025–26	1,697,813	6,151	19,314	17,320	Slavia Prague

== Records ==
As of 25 May 2026.

Following statistics count only seasons of Czech First League since its inception in 1993. Highlighted players currently plays in the Czech First League.

=== Most appearances ===
Rank	Player	Matches
1	(Czech Republic) Milan Petržela	537
2	(Czech Republic) Josef Jindřišek	448
3	(Czech Republic) Václav Procházka	447
4	(Czech Republic) Jiří Fleišman	444
5	(Czech Republic) Marek Matějovský	443
6	(Czech Republic) Stanislav Vlček	436
7	(Czech Republic) Martin Vaniak	432
7	(Czech Republic) Rudolf Otepka	432
9	(Czech Republic) Jan Kovařík	430
10	(Czech Republic) Pavel Horváth	426

=== Top scorers ===
Rank	Player	Goals	Matches
1	(Czech Republic) David Lafata	198	418
2	(Czech Republic) Horst Siegl	134	310
3	(Czech Republic) Libor Došek	125	407
4	(Czech Republic) Jan Chramosta	110	381
5	(Czech Republic) Milan Škoda	104	346
6	(Czech Republic) Jakub Řezníček	99	356
7	(Czech Republic) Stanislav Vlček	94	436
8	(Czech Republic) Luděk Zelenka	92	342
9	(Czech Republic) Marek Kulič	88	389
10	(Czech Republic) Martin Doležal	87	305
10	(Czech Republic) Jan Kuchta	87	218

=== Most clean sheets ===
Rank	Player	Clean sheets	Matches
1	(Czech Republic) Jaromír Blažek	157	401
2	(Czech Republic) Martin Vaniak	153	432
3	(Czech Republic) Tomáš Grigar	117	376
4	(Slovakia) Matúš Kozáčik	111	242
5	(Czech Republic) Tomáš Poštulka	110	309
6	(Czech Republic) Michal Špit	101	300
7	(Czech Republic) Radek Černý	90	212
7	(Czech Republic) Ondřej Kolář	90	186
7	(Czech Republic) Jan Laštůvka	90	275
10	(Czech Republic) Petr Drobisz	88	289
10	(Czech Republic) Aleš Hruška	88	308

=== Matches ===
Record	Match	Score	Season
Highest scoring	Zlín–Mladá Boleslav	5–9	2023–24
Biggest home win	Slavia–Slovácká Slavia Uherské Hradiště	9–1	1995–96
Biggest away win	Teplice–Mladá Boleslav	0–8	2018–19
Highest scoring draw	Jablonec–Znojmo	5–5	2013–14
Highest scoring draw	Teplice–Plzeň	5–5	2026–27
