= 2023–24 FC Zbrojovka Brno season =

FC Zbrojovka Brno
2023–24 season
- President: Libor Zábranský (straw man); Václav "Katapult" Bartoněk (de facto)
- Manager: Luděk Klusáček (until 24 October); Tomáš Polách (from 24 October); Lukáš Kříž (interim); TBA (internal sources)
- Stadium: ADAX INVEST Arena
- Fortuna národní liga: 4th
- Czech Cup: Third round
- Top goalscorer: League: Jakub Řezníček (12); All: Jakub Řezníček (12)
- Highest home attendance: 4,718, 23 September 2023 v Vyškov (league)
- Lowest home attendance: 2,036, 12 August 2023 v Chrudim (league)
- Average home league attendance: 2,752
- Biggest win: 4–0, 30 August 2023 v FC Vsetín (cup)
- Biggest defeat: 0–2, 2 August 2023 v Dukla Prague (league)
Home colours	Away colours

The 2023–24 FC Zbrojovka Brno season is the club's 5th season in the Fortuna národní liga. The team was relegated from the first league for the third time in six years and is competing in Fortuna národní liga and the Czech Cup.

== Changes ==
=== Ownership structure ===
Before the start of the season, the investment group PORTIVA a.s. joined Zbrojovka. It currently has a minority share in the club, which will gradually increase to a majority of 61 percent. 5 percent of the shares were also acquired by the Brno Regional Chamber of Commerce. The current owner and chairman of the board of directors, Václav Bartoněk, will remain at the club in the position of advisor. A new position of executive director was introduced in the club, to which Ladislav Valášek was appointed. He previously worked in executive positions in Bohemians 1905, Viktoria Plzeň, Fastav Zlín or FAČR.

=== Technical staff ===
On 9 June 2023, Luděk Klusáček was appointed as the new head coach, his assistants are Tomáš Polách and Josef Mucha. The goalkeeper coach Martin Doležal remained in his position. The sports manager is Zdeněk Psotka who previously worked as a technical director at FAČR. On October 24, 2023, Luděk Klusáček was sacked after unsatisfactory results. The role of head coach was temporarily taken over by Tomáš Polách in cooperation with Josef Mucha. On November 14, the board of directors of FC Zbrojovka Brno decided to keep Tomáš Polách in the position of head coach. Polách signed a two-year contract with a one-year option.

=== Others ===
To mark 110 years since its foundation, the club has unveiled a new anniversary logo that will take them into the upcoming season. The new kit supplier will be Puma, which returns to the club after 29 years.

== First team squad ==
As of 29 February 2024.

Note: Flags indicate national team as defined under FIFA eligibility rules; some limited exceptions apply. Players may hold more than one non-FIFA nationality.

No.	Pos.	Nation	Player
1	GK	(Czech Republic) CZE	Michal Hložánek
3	DF	(Ghana) GHA	Foster Gyamfi (on loan from Esbjerg)
4	DF	(Czech Republic) CZE	Luděk Pernica
5	DF	(Czech Republic) CZE	Jiří Hamza
6	DF	(Czech Republic) CZE	Lukáš Endl
7	MF	(Czech Republic) CZE	Ondřej Pachlopník
8	DF	(Czech Republic) CZE	Zdeněk Toman
9	FW	(Czech Republic) CZE	Denis Alijagić
11	MF	(Czech Republic) CZE	Adam Fousek
13	MF	(Czech Republic) CZE	Jiří Texl
16	FW	(Czech Republic) CZE	Adam Kronus (on loan from Viktoria Plzeň)
17	MF	(Guinea) GUI	Kamso Mara
18	DF	(Czech Republic) CZE	Denis Granečný

No.	Pos.	Nation	Player
19	DF	(Denmark) DEN	Kristoffer Jørgensen (on loan from Sønderjyske)
23	DF	(Czech Republic) CZE	Jakub Šural
24	GK	(Czech Republic) CZE	Dominik Sváček (on loan from Viktoria Plzeň)
25	MF	(Czech Republic) CZE	Roman Potočný (on loan from České Budějovice)
26	DF	(Czech Republic) CZE	Martin Nový (on loan from Bohemians 1905)
29	MF	(Czech Republic) CZE	Tomáš Smejkal
31	MF	(Czech Republic) CZE	David Jambor
32	MF	(Czech Republic) CZE	Jan Hellebrand
35	DF	(Czech Republic) CZE	Josef Koželuh (on loan from Viktoria Plzeň)
37	FW	(Czech Republic) CZE	Jakub Řezníček
53	GK	(Czech Republic) CZE	Martin Berkovec
92	DF	(Guinea) GUI	Simon Falette

=== Out on loan ===
Note: Flags indicate national team as defined under FIFA eligibility rules; some limited exceptions apply. Players may hold more than one non-FIFA nationality.

No.	Pos.	Nation	Player
—	MF	(Nigeria) NGA	Wale Musa Alli (at České Budějovice)
—	DF	(Czech Republic) CZE	Jan Štěrba (at Prostějov)

No.	Pos.	Nation	Player
—	MF	(Slovakia) SVK	Nicolas Martinek (at Kroměříž)

== Transfers ==
=== In ===
Pos	Player	Transferred from	Fee	Window	Date	Source
MF	(Czech Republic) Oldřich Pragr	(Czech Republic) Znojmo	Loan return	Summer	19 June 2023	
MF	(Czech Republic) David Jambor	(Czech Republic) Vyškov	Loan return	Summer	19 June 2023	
DF	(Czech Republic) Jiří Hamza	(Czech Republic) Zbrojovka Brno	Youth team	Summer	19 June 2023	
DF	(Czech Republic) Zdeněk Toman	(Czech Republic) Zbrojovka Brno	Youth team	Summer	19 June 2023	
GK	(Czech Republic) Michal Hložánek	(Czech Republic) Zbrojovka Brno	Youth team	Summer	19 June 2023	
MF	(Czech Republic) Tomáš Kopr	(Czech Republic) Zbrojovka Brno	Youth team	Summer	19 June 2023	
DF	(Czech Republic) Martin Nový	(Czech Republic) Bohemians	Loan ^{(without option)}	Summer	23 June 2023	
DF	(Czech Republic) Martin Toml	(Slovakia) Zlaté Moravce	Free transfer	Summer	3 July 2023	
MF	(Czech Republic) Roman Potočný	(Czech Republic) České Budějovice	Loan ^{(without option)}	Summer	12 July 2023	
MF	(Slovakia) Nicolas Martinek	(Slovakia) Dubnica n. Váhom	Undisclosed	Summer	17 July 2023	
FW	(Czech Republic) Adam Kronus	(Czech Republic) Viktoria Plzeň	Loan ^{(without option)}	Summer	19 July 2023	
MF	(Czech Republic) Pavel Gaszczyk	(Czech Republic) Viktoria Plzeň	Loan ^{(without option)}	Summer	19 July 2023	
DF	(Czech Republic) Tomáš Smejkal	(Czech Republic) Jablonec	Undisclosed	Summer	20 July 2023	

=== Out ===
Pos	Player	Transferred to	Fee	Window	Date	Source
MF	(Czech Republic) Michal Ševčík	(Czech Republic) Sparta Prague	Undisclosed	Summer	19 June 2023	

== Friendly matches ==
=== Pre-season ===
June 24, 2023 Friendly	Dunajská Streda	1–1	Zbrojovka Brno	Mierovo
11:30 CEST (UTC+2)	Ramadan 69'	Report	Fousek 75'	Stadium: ihrisko Mierovo; Attendance: 1,000; Referee: Smolák

July 1, 2023 Friendly	Zbrojovka Brno	1–0	Púchov	Brno
12:00 CEST (UTC+2)	Granečný 62'	Report		Stadium: Training ground no.2, ADAX INVEST Arena; Attendance: 150

July 5, 2023 Friendly	Zbrojovka Brno	2–0	Banská Bystrica	Rosice
12:00 CEST (UTC+2)	Kronus 42'; Hladík 65'	Report		Stadium: Stadion FC Slovan Rosice; Attendance: 300

July 8, 2023 Friendly	Termalica Nieciecza	1–2	Zbrojovka Brno	Lutín
12:00 CEST (UTC+2)	Hilbrycht 43'	Report	Řezníček 43'; Kronus 85'	Stadium: Stadion Lutín; Attendance: 100

July 15, 2023 Friendly	Prostějov	1–0	Zbrojovka Brno	Olomouc
10:30 CEST (UTC+2)	Malec 65'	Report		Stadium: Stadion FK Holice

=== Mid-season ===
December 1, 2023 Friendly	Chrudim	0–9	Zbrojovka Brno	Chrudim
11:45 CEST (UTC+2)		Report	Martinek 7'; Potočný 19', 44' (pen.), 49'; Granečný 33', 89'; Hellebrand 61'; Pachlopník 71'; Juritka 79'	Stadium: Stadion Emila Zátopka; Attendance: 100; Referee: Lukáš Raplík

December 8, 2023 Friendly	Zbrojovka Brno	2–1	Opava	Brno
11:30 CEST (UTC+2)	Juritka 74'; Večeřa 85'	Report	Rezek 74'	Stadium: TCM Brno

== Competitions ==
Win Draw Loss

=== Overview ===
Competition	First match	Last match	Starting round	Final position	Record							
Competition	First match	Last match	Starting round	Final position	Pld	W	D	L	GF	GA	GD	Win %
Fortuna národní liga	3 August 2023	25 May 2024	Matchday 1	TBA	18	8	3	7	25	20	+5	44.44
MOL Cup	9 August 2023	27 September 2023	First round	Third round	3	2	0	1	10	4	+6	66.67
Total					21	10	3	8	35	24	+11	47.62

Last updated: 15 March 2024
Source: Competitions

=== Fortuna národní liga ===
==== Results summary ====
Overall								Home						Away					
Pld	W	D	L	GF	GA	GD	Pts	W	D	L	GF	GA	GD	W	D	L	GF	GA	GD
18	8	3	7	25	20	+5	27	3	2	4	9	7	+2	5	1	3	16	13	+3

Last updated: 15 March 2024.

==== Results by round ====
Round	1	2	3	4	5	6	7	8	9	10	11	12	13	14	15	16	17	18	19	20	21	22	23	24	25	26	27	28	29	30
Ground	H	A	H	A	H	A	A	H	A	H	A	H	A	H	A	H	A	H												
Result	D	W	L	L	W	W	W	W	W	L	L	L	L	W	W	L	D	D												
Position	7	4	6	13	5	6	6	5	2	3	3	5	6	5	4	6	4	4												

Updated to match(es) played on 15 March 2024. Source:
A = Away; H = Home; W = Win; D = Draw; L = Loss

==== League table ====
Pos	Team	Pld	W	D	L	GF	GA	GD	Pts
7	Vlašim	30	9	13	8	41	43	−2	40
8	Viktoria Žižkov	30	11	6	13	44	51	−7	39
9	Zbrojovka Brno	30	11	6	13	41	42	−1	39
10	Líšeň	30	9	12	9	34	34	0	39
11	Sparta Prague B	30	10	7	13	52	58	−6	37

Source: Fortuna národní liga
Rules for classification: 1) Points; 2) Head-to-head points; 3) Head-to-head goal difference; 4) Head-to-head goals scored; 5) Goal difference; 6) Goals scored; 7) Play-off (if deciding promotion or relegation); 8) Draw

==== Results ====
24 July 2023 1	Zbrojovka Brno	1–1	Vlašim	Brno
17:30 CEST (UTC+2)	Řezníček 79'; Potočný (yellow card) 90+1'	Report	Kulhánek (yellow card) 28'; Singhateh 60'	Stadium: ADAX Invest Arena; Attendance: 3,018; Referee: Michal Křepský

30 July 2023 2	Sigma Olomouc "B"	1–2	Zbrojovka Brno	Olomouc
17:00 CEST (UTC+2)	Muritala 7'	Report	Řezníček 30'; Potočný (yellow card) 43'; Potočný 66'; David Jambor (yellow card) 78'	Stadium: Andrův stadion Attendance: 735; Referee: Vojtěch Opočenský

2 August 2023 3	Zbrojovka Brno	0–2	Dukla Prague	Brno
18:00 CEST (UTC+2)	Řezníček (yellow card) 62'; Hamza (yellow card) 90+3'	Report	Peterka (yellow card) 15'; Šebrle 34'; Ullman (yellow card) 45+1'; Dominik Hašek (yellow card) 60'; Matějka 70'	Stadium: ADAX Invest Arena; Attendance: 3,203; Referee: Pavel Orel

5 August 2023 4	Táborsko	2–1	Zbrojovka Brno	Tábor
17:00 CEST (UTC+2)	Zeman 3'; Bláha (yellow card) 68'; Plachý 79'; Varačka (yellow card) 90+1'	Report	Granečný (yellow card) 57'; Texl 74'; Řezníček (yellow card) 89'	Stadium: Stadion v Kvapilově ulici Attendance: 1,052; Referee: Filip Kotala

12 August 2023 5	Zbrojovka Brno	4–1	Chrudim	Brno
17:00 CEST (UTC+2)	Řezníček 6' (pen.), 77', 83'; Smejkal 33'; Jambor (yellow card) 63'; Texl (yellow card) 90+2'	Report	Borkovec (yellow card) 49'; Kesner (yellow card) 79'; Míka 85'	Stadium: ADAX Invest Arena; Attendance: 2,036; Referee: Jan Všetečka

18 August 2023 6	Sparta Prague "B"	1–2	Zbrojovka Brno	Prague
17:45 CEST (UTC+2)	Schánělec 25'	Report	Potočný (yellow card) 16'; Mara (yellow card) 38'; Šural (yellow card) 58'; Granečný (yellow card) 75'; Řezníček 82'; Šural 88'	Stadium: epet ARENA; Attendance: 1,087; Referee: Petr Hocek

26 August 2023 7	Prostějov	0–1	Zbrojovka Brno	Olomouc
10:30 CEST (UTC+2)	Bartolomeu (yellow card) 69'; Spáčil (yellow card) 75'; Gabriš (yellow card) 81'	Report	Smejkal (yellow card) 55'; Řezníček 61'; Šural (yellow card) 69'	Stadium: Stadion FK Holice; Attendance: 820; Referee: Jan Petřík

2 September 2023 8	Zbrojovka Brno	1–0	Varnsdorf	Brno
17:00 CEST (UTC+2)	Šural (yellow card) 12'; Jambor (yellow card) 27'; Potočný 67'	Report	Kubista (yellow card) 53'	Stadium: ADAX Invest Arena; Attendance: 2,555; Referee: Karel Rouček

15 September 2023 9	Jihlava	0–1	Zbrojovka Brno	Jihlava
17:00 CEST (UTC+2)	Vedral (yellow card) 32'; Svoboda (yellow card) 40' (yellow-red card) 56'	Report	Endl (yellow card) 72'; Alijagić 80'; Granečný (yellow card) 88'	Stadium: Stadion v Jiráskově ulici Attendance: 991; Referee: Tomáš Batík

23 September 2023 10	Zbrojovka Brno	0–1	Vyškov	Brno
17:00 CEST (UTC+2)		Report	Štěpánek 18'; Mafwenta (yellow card) 73'; Souaré (yellow card) 83'; Lahodný (yellow card) 85'	Stadium: ADAX Invest Arena; Attendance: 4,718; Referee: Petr Hocek

30 September 2023 11	Opava	2–1	Zbrojovka Brno	Opava
16:00 CEST (UTC+2)	Vaněček 19'; Málek 60'; Blecha (yellow card) 66'; Málek (yellow card) 71'; Rataj (yellow card) 89'	Report	Alijagić 3'; Koželuh (yellow card) 12'; Kronus (yellow card) 51' (yellow-red card) 72'; Potočný (yellow card) 56'; Jambor (yellow card) 67'	Stadium: Stadion v Městských sadech Attendance: 1,836; Referee: Tomáš Petřík

7 October 2023 12	Zbrojovka Brno	0–1	Příbram	Brno
17:30 CEST (UTC+2)	Koželuh (yellow card) 69' (yellow-red card) 75'; Smejkal (yellow card) 90'	Report	Nečas 21'; Jandera (yellow card) 34'; Jahić (yellow card) 41'; Antwi (yellow card) 90+3'	Stadium: ADAX Invest Arena; Attendance: 2,508; Referee: Marek Radina

22 October 2023 13	Viktoria Žižkov	4–2	Zbrojovka Brno	Prague
10:15 CEST (UTC+2)	Richter 9'; Endl 18' (o.g.); Voltr 29'; Prošek 70'	Report	Řezníček 49', 83'	Stadium: FK Viktoria Stadion; Attendance: 1,238; Referee: Michael Kvítek

27 October 2023 14	Zbrojovka Brno	3–0	Líšeň	Brno
17:00 CEST (UTC+2)	Řezníček (yellow card) 19'; Řezníček 29', 88' (pen.); Kronus 83'; Potočný (yellow card) 90+1'	Report	Vandas (yellow card) 33'; Jokovič (yellow card) 86'; Aldin (yellow card) 90+1'	Stadium: ADAX Invest Arena; Attendance: 3,622; Referee: Stanislav Volek

4 November 2023 15	Kroměříž	0–3	Zbrojovka Brno	Kroměříž
14:00 CEST (UTC+2)	Jaroň (yellow card) 30'; Kudela (yellow card) 58'	Report	Alijagić 5'; Řezníček 32' (pen.); Štěrba 58'	Stadium: Stadion SK Hanácká Slavia Kroměříž; Attendance: 1,457; Referee: Tomáš Batík

11 November 2023 16	Zbrojovka Brno	0–1	Sigma Olomouc "B"	Brno
15:00 CEST (UTC+2)	Pachlopník (yellow card) 39'; Řezníček (yellow card) 67'; Endl (yellow card) 89'; Koželuh (yellow card) 89'	Report	Šíp (yellow card) 29'; Jan Fiala 82'; Jan Fiala (yellow card) 87'	Stadium: ADAX Invest Arena; Attendance: 3,026; Referee: Petr Dorušák

2 March 2024 17	Dukla Prague	3–3	Zbrojovka Brno	Prague
13:00 CEST (UTC+2)		Report		Stadium: Stadion Juliska; Attendance: 2,176; Referee: Ondřej Berka

9 March 2024 18	Zbrojovka Brno	v	Táborsko	Brno
: CEST (UTC+2)				Stadium: ADAX Invest Arena

=== Czech Cup ===
==== Results ====
9 August 2023 First round	Tatran Ždírec nad Doubravou (4)	1–4	Zbrojovka Brno	Ždírec nad Doubravou
17:00 CEST (UTC+2)	Svoboda 41'; Pavlas (yellow card) 76'	Report	Gaszczyk 2'; Hladík 23'; Granečný 71'; Alli 78'	Stadium: Stadion Ždírec nad Doubravou; Attendance: 770; Referee: Jan Machálek

30 August 2023 Second round	FC Vsetín (4)	0–4	Zbrojovka Brno	Vsetín
17:00 CEST (UTC+2)	Stuchlík (yellow card) 22'; Vítek (yellow card) 27'	Report	Koželuh 25'; Fousek 39'; Potočný 40', (yellow card) 55'; Mara (yellow card) 66'; Divíšek 85'	Stadium: Fotbalový stadion na Tyršově ulici Attendance: 1,644; Referee: Tomáš Batík

27 September 2023 Third round	Opava	3–2	Zbrojovka Brno	Opava
15:30 CEST (UTC+2)	Helebrand 15'; Blecha 21'; Yahaya 37'; Janoščín (yellow card) 67'; Rataj (yellow card) 77'; Rezek (yellow card) 85'	Report	Alijagić 41'; Kronus 86'; Jambor (yellow card) 66'; Pachlopník (yellow card) 88'	Stadium: Stadion v Městských sadech Attendance: 1,325; Referee: Vít Zaoral

== Squad statistics ==
=== Appearances and goals ===
No.	Pos	Nat	Player	Total		Fortuna národní liga		MOL Cup	
No.	Pos	Nat	Player	Apps	Goals	Apps	Goals	Apps	Goals
Goalkeepers
1	GK	(Czech Republic) CZE	Michal Hložánek	0	0	0	0	0	0
53	GK	(Czech Republic) CZE	Martin Berkovec	16	0	16	0	0	0
71	GK	(Czech Republic) CZE	Jakub Šiman	3	0	0	0	3	0
Defenders
5	DF	(Czech Republic) CZE	Jiří Hamza	13	0	6+5	0	2	0
6	DF	(Czech Republic) CZE	Lukáš Endl	16	0	15	0	1	0
8	DF	(Czech Republic) CZE	Zdeněk Toman	7	0	1+4	0	2	0
15	DF	(Czech Republic) CZE	Jan Štěrba	12	1	8+3	1	0+1	0
18	DF	(Czech Republic) CZE	Denis Granečný	17	1	12+3	0	1+1	1
23	DF	(Czech Republic) CZE	Jakub Šural	8	1	6	1	1+1	0
24	DF	(Czech Republic) CZE	Josef Divíšek	8	1	3+4	0	1	1
26	DF	(Czech Republic) CZE	Martin Nový	3	0	3	0	0	0
35	DF	(Czech Republic) CZE	Josef Koželuh	16	1	10+3	0	2+1	1
42	DF	(Czech Republic) CZE	Ondřej Šlapanský	3	0	1+1	0	1	0
Midfielders
7	MF	(Czech Republic) CZE	Ondřej Pachlopník	4	0	2+1	0	0+1	0
11	MF	(Czech Republic) CZE	Adam Fousek	11	1	7+3	0	1	1
13	MF	(Czech Republic) CZE	Jiří Texl	13	1	11	1	1+1	0
17	MF	(Guinea) GUI	Kamso Mara	9	0	7	0	0+2	0
19	MF	(Czech Republic) CZE	Pavel Gaszczyk	12	1	0+10	0	2	1
21	MF	(Czech Republic) CZE	Tomáš Kopr	1	0	0	0	0+1	0
25	MF	(Czech Republic) CZE	Roman Potočný	18	3	11+4	2	1+2	1
29	MF	(Czech Republic) CZE	Tomáš Smejkal	18	1	8+7	1	3	0
31	MF	(Czech Republic) CZE	David Jambor	13	0	9+2	0	1+1	0
32	MF	(Czech Republic) CZE	Jan Hellebrand	6	0	2+4	0	0	0
38	MF	(Slovakia) SVK	Peter Štepanovský	1	0	0	0	1	0
79	MF	(Slovakia) SVK	Nicolas Martinek	7	0	1+4	0	1+1	0
Forwards
9	FW	(Czech Republic) CZE	Denis Alijagić	9	4	6+2	3	1	1
16	FW	(Czech Republic) CZE	Adam Kronus	18	2	11+4	1	2+1	1
37	FW	(Czech Republic) CZE	Jakub Řezníček	16	12	15+1	12	0	0
39	FW	(Czech Republic) CZE	Filip Večeřa	1	0	0	0	0+1	0
Players transferred/loaned out during the season
	DF	(Czech Republic) CZE	Martin Toml	4	0	3	0	1	0
	MF	(Nigeria) NGA	Wale Musa Alli	5	1	0+4	0	1	1
	FW	(Czech Republic) CZE	Jan Hladík	10	1	2+6	0	1+1	1

Last updated: 12 November 2023
Source: Competitions

=== Goal Scorers ===
Place	Pos.	Name	Fortuna národní liga	MOL Cup	Total
1	FW	(Czech Republic) Jakub Řezníček	12	0	12
2	FW	(Czech Republic) Denis Alijagić	3	1	4
3	MF	(Czech Republic) Roman Potočný	2	1	3
4	MF	(Czech Republic) Adam Kronus	1	1	2
5	MF	(Czech Republic) Jiří Texl	1	0	1
5	MF	(Czech Republic) Tomáš Smejkal	1	0	1
5	DF	(Czech Republic) Jan Štěrba	1	0	1
5	DF	(Czech Republic) Jakub Šural	1	0	1
5	DF	(Czech Republic) Josef Koželuh	0	1	1
5	MF	(Czech Republic) Pavel Gaszczyk	0	1	1
5	DF	(Czech Republic) Denis Granečný	0	1	1
5	MF	(Czech Republic) Adam Fousek	0	1	1
5	DF	(Czech Republic) Josef Divíšek	0	1	1
5	MF	(Nigeria) Wale Musa Alli	0	1	1
5	FW	(Czech Republic) Jan Hladík	0	1	1
Own goals			0	0	0
TOTAL			22	10	32

Last updated: 5 November 2023
Source: Competitions

=== Assists ===
Place	Pos.	Name	Fortuna národní liga	MOL Cup	Total
1	MF	(Czech Republic) Adam Fousek	3	0	3
1	MF	(Czech Republic) Roman Potočný	2	1	3
1	MF	(Czech Republic) Tomáš Smejkal	2	1	3
1	DF	(Czech Republic) Jan Hladík	2	1	3
2	FW	(Czech Republic) Jakub Řezníček	2	0	2
2	DF	(Czech Republic) Lukáš Endl	2	0	2
2	MF	(Czech Republic) Adam Kronus	1	1	2
2	MF	(Nigeria) Wale Musa Alli	0	2	2
3	DF	(Czech Republic) Martin Nový	1	0	1
3	MF	(Czech Republic) Pavel Gaszczyk	1	0	1
3	MF	(Guinea) Kamso Mara	1	0	1
3	DF	(Czech Republic) Josef Koželuh	1	0	1
3	MF	(Czech Republic) Jiří Texl	0	1	1
3	MF	(Slovakia) Nicolas Martinek	0	1	1
TOTAL			19	9	28

Last updated: 5 November 2023
Source: Competitions

=== Clean sheets ===
Place	Pos.	Name	Fortuna národní liga	MOL Cup	Total
1	GK	(Czech Republic) Martin Berkovec	5	0	5
2	GK	(Czech Republic) Jakub Šiman	0	1	1
3	GK	(Czech Republic) Michal Hložánek	0	0	0
TOTAL			5	1	6

Last updated: 5 November 2023
Source: Competitions

=== Disciplinary record ===
Position	Name	Fortuna národní liga		MOL Cup		Total	
Position	Name	Booked	Sent off (straight red)	Booked	Sent off (straight red)	Booked	Sent off (straight red)
FW	(Czech Republic) Jakub Řezníček	2	0	0	0	2	0
MF	(Czech Republic) Roman Potočný	2	0	0	0	2	0
MF	(Czech Republic) Jiří Hamza	1	0	0	0	1	0
MF	(Czech Republic) Denis Granečný	1	0	0	0	1	0
MF	(Czech Republic) David Jambor	1	0	0	0	1	0
Players away on loan:
Players who left Zbrojovka during the season:
	TOTALS	7	0	0	0	7	0

Last updated: 10 August 2023
Source: Competitions
