= 2022–23 FC Zbrojovka Brno season =

FC Zbrojovka Brno
2022–23 season
- President: Václav Bartoněk
- Manager: Richard Dostálek (until 11 April); Martin Hašek (from 11 April)
- Stadium: ADAX Invest Arena
- Fortuna liga: 16th (relegated)
- Czech Cup: Quarter-finals
- Top goalscorer: League: Jakub Řezníček (19); All: Jakub Řezníček (21)
- Highest home attendance: 10,200, 28 August 2022 v Slavia Prague (league)
- Lowest home attendance: 3,155, 8 April 2023 v Hradec Králové (league)
- Average home league attendance: 5,778
- Biggest win: 3–0 vs Liberec (H)
- Biggest defeat: 0–4 vs Sparta Prague (H); 0–4 vs Slavia Prague (H); 0–4 vs Viktoria Plzeň (A)
Home colours	Away colours

The 2022–23 FC Zbrojovka Brno season is the club's 26th season in the Czech First League. The team is competing in Czech First League and the Czech Cup.

== First team squad ==
As of 14 February 2023.

Note: Flags indicate national team as defined under FIFA eligibility rules; some limited exceptions apply. Players may hold more than one non-FIFA nationality.

No.	Pos.	Nation	Player
3	DF	(Benin) BEN	Mohamed Tijani (on loan from Plzeň)
4	DF	(Czech Republic) CZE	Jan Hlavica
6	DF	(Czech Republic) CZE	Lukáš Endl
7	MF	(Czech Republic) CZE	Ondřej Pachlopník
8	FW	(Czech Republic) CZE	Lukáš Rogožan
10	MF	(Czech Republic) CZE	Šimon Falta (on loan from Plzeň)
11	MF	(Czech Republic) CZE	Adam Fousek
13	MF	(Czech Republic) CZE	Jiří Texl
15	DF	(Czech Republic) CZE	Jan Štěrba
16	DF	(Slovakia) SVK	Róbert Matejov
17	MF	(Nigeria) NGA	Wale Musa Alli
18	DF	(Czech Republic) CZE	Denis Granečný
19	MF	(Czech Republic) CZE	Michal Ševčík

No.	Pos.	Nation	Player
20	FW	(Czech Republic) CZE	Jan Hladík
21	MF	(Czech Republic) CZE	Filip Blecha (on loan from Slavia)
22	DF	(Czech Republic) CZE	Matěj Hrabina
23	DF	(Czech Republic) CZE	Jakub Šural
24	DF	(Czech Republic) CZE	Josef Divíšek
25	MF	(Czech Republic) CZE	Jakub Nečas
27	MF	(Czech Republic) CZE	Filip Souček (on loan from Sparta)
35	DF	(Czech Republic) CZE	Josef Koželuh (on loan from Plzeň)
37	FW	(Czech Republic) CZE	Jakub Řezníček
40	GK	(Czech Republic) CZE	Vlastimil Hrubý
53	GK	(Czech Republic) CZE	Martin Berkovec
71	GK	(Czech Republic) CZE	Jakub Šiman

=== Out on loan ===
As of 14 February 2023.

Note: Flags indicate national team as defined under FIFA eligibility rules; some limited exceptions apply. Players may hold more than one non-FIFA nationality.

No. / Pos. / Nation / Player; — / MF / (Czech Republic) CZE / David Jambor (at Vyškov)	No. / Pos. / Nation / Player; — / MF / (Czech Republic) CZE / Oldřich Pragr (at Znojmo)

== Friendly matches ==
=== Pre-season ===
June 18, 2022 Friendly	Bystrc-Kníničky	0–6	Zbrojovka Brno	Brno-Bystrc
18:00 CEST (UTC+2)		Report	Pragr 27'; Řezníček 36'; Blecha 43'; Fousek 47'; Kohoutek 49'; Hladík 73'	Stadium: Stadion pod Pekařkou; Attendance: 1,200

June 25, 2022 Friendly	Podbrezová	4–2	Zbrojovka Brno	Červeník
14:00 CEST (UTC+2)	Issa 12' (40); Kováčik 42'; Cobnan 75'	Report	Blecha 44' (pen.); Přichystal 88'	Stadium: hřiště Červeník

July 2, 2022 Friendly	Zbrojovka Brno	2–2	Slovan Bratislava	Brno
17:00 CEST (UTC+2)	Hladík 37' (pen.); Alli 57'	Report	Ramírez 34'; Zmrhal 82'	Stadium: ADAX Invest Arena

July 9, 2022 Friendly	Sturm Graz	0–0	Zbrojovka Brno	Weiz
16:00 CEST (UTC+2)		Report		Stadium: Fussballgrund Weiz; Attendance: 400

July 15, 2022 Friendly	Kroměříž	0–1	Zbrojovka Brno	Kroměříž
18:00 CEST (UTC+2)		Report	Fousek 51'	Stadium: Stadion Jožky Silného

July 23, 2022 Friendly	Zbrojovka Brno	0–0	Vysočina Jihlava	Brno
17:00 CEST (UTC+2)		Report		Stadium: ADAX Invest Arena; Attendance: 543

=== Mid-season ===
November 22, 2022 Tipsport liga	Zlín	0–2	Zbrojovka Brno	Zlín
11:00 CEST (UTC+2)		Report	Hladík 33'; Nečas 56'	Stadium: Areál Vl. Marečka; Attendance: 75

November 25, 2022 Tipsport liga	Spartak Trnava	1–3	Zbrojovka Brno	Senec
10:30 CEST (UTC+2)	Ikugar 82'	Report	Hladík 44'; Přichystal 48'; Nečas 74'

December 2, 2022 Tipsport liga	Trenčín	1–2	Zbrojovka Brno	Trenčín
14:00 CEST (UTC+2)	Kranthove 56'	Report	Nečas 37'; Blecha 59'	Attendance: 100

January 10, 2023 Friendly	Austria Vienna	3–4	Zbrojovka Brno	Wien
15:00 CEST (UTC+2)	Fischer 14', 15', 19'	Report	Ševčík 20'; Hladík 45'; Nečas 68'; Blecha 85'

January 14, 2023 Friendly	Zbrojovka Brno	1–2	Podbrezová	Brno
13:30 CEST (UTC+2)	Řezníček 63'	Report	Kuzma 16'; Špyrka 38'	Stadium: UT Lužánky

January 20, 2023 Friendly	Slovan Bratislava	2–1	Zbrojovka Brno	Senica
14:00 CEST (UTC+2)	Čavrić 26'; Kucka 82'	Report	Ševčík 19'	Stadium: OMS Arena; Referee: Parilák

== Competitions ==
Win Draw Loss

=== Overall record ===
Competition	First match	Last match	Starting round	Final position	Record							
Competition	First match	Last match	Starting round	Final position	Pld	W	D	L	GF	GA	GD	Win %
Fortuna liga	30 July 2022	28 May 2023	Matchday 1	Matchday 35	35	8	9	18	41	64	−23	22.86
MOL Cup	14 September 2022	1 March 2023	Second round	Quarter-finals	4	3	0	1	10	5	+5	75.00
Total					39	11	9	19	51	69	−18	28.21

Last updated: 28 May 2023
Source: Competitions

=== Czech First League ===
==== Results summary ====
Overall								Home						Away					
Pld	W	D	L	GF	GA	GD	Pts	W	D	L	GF	GA	GD	W	D	L	GF	GA	GD
35	8	9	18	41	64	−23	33	4	5	8	22	31	−9	4	4	10	19	33	−14

Last updated: 28 May 2023.

==== Results by round ====
Round	1	2	3	4	5	6	7	8	9	10	11	12	13	14	15	16	17	18	19	20	21	22	23	24	25	26	27	28	29	30	31	32	33	34	35
Ground	H	A	H	A	H	A	H	A	H	A	H	A	A	H	A	H	A	H	A	H	A	H	A	H	A	H	H	A	H	A	A	H	A	A	H
Result	D	W	W	L	L	W	L	W	D	L	L	L	W	W	L	L	D	L	L	W	D	D	D	L	L	L	W	L	D	L	L	L	L	D	D
Position	8	3	1	5	8	6	7	5	6	6	8	10	8	5	8	11	11	11	11	11	10	11	9	12	12	13	12	13	13	14	14	14	14	16	16

Updated to match(es) played on 28 May 2023. Source:
A = Away; H = Home; W = Win; D = Draw; L = Loss

==== Regular season ====
===== League table =====
Pos	Team	Pld	W	D	L	GF	GA	GD	Pts	Qualification or relegation
12	Baník Ostrava	30	9	8	13	43	42	+1	35	Qualification for the relegation group
13	Teplice	30	8	8	14	38	63	−25	32	Qualification for the relegation group
14	Zbrojovka Brno	30	8	7	15	40	56	−16	31	Qualification for the relegation group
15	Pardubice	30	8	4	18	29	58	−29	28	Qualification for the relegation group
16	Trinity Zlín	30	5	11	14	37	55	−18	26	Qualification for the relegation group

Source: Fortuna Liga
Rules for classification: 1) Points; 2) Head-to-head points; 3) Head-to-head goal difference; 4) Head-to-head goals scored; 5) Goal difference; 6) Goals scored; 7) Fair-play ranking; 8) Draw.

===== Results =====
30 July 2022 1	Zbrojovka Brno	2–2	Slovácko	Brno
16:00 CEST (UTC+2)	M. Ševčík 21'; Přichystal 32'; Falta (yellow card) 61'; Granečný (yellow card) 79'	Report	Holzer 30'; Hofmann (yellow card) 32'; Trávník 71'	Stadium: ADAX Invest Arena; Attendance: 8,024; Referee: Marek Radina

6 August 2022 2	Sigma Olomouc	0–2	Zbrojovka Brno	Olomouc
16:00 CEST (UTC+2)		Report	Řezníček 20'; Texl (yellow card) 36'; Přichystal (yellow card) 42'; Jakub Šural (yellow card) 53'; Granečný (yellow card) 62'; M. Ševčík 70'	Stadium: Andrův stadion Attendance: 4,636; Referee: Ladislav Szikszay

13 August 2022 3	Zbrojovka Brno	3–1	Mladá Boleslav	Brno
16:00 CEST (UTC+2)	Granečný (yellow card) 31'; Souček 49'; Jakub Šural (yellow card) 75'; M. Ševčík 79'; Matejov 90+4'	Report	Milan Škoda 26'; Suchý (yellow card) 38'; Donát (yellow card) 44'; Milan Škoda (yellow card) 75'	Stadium: ADAX Invest Arena; Attendance: 6,218; Referee: Zbyněk Proske

28 August 2022 5	Zbrojovka Brno	0–4	Slavia Praha	Brno
19:00 CEST (UTC+2)	Hrabina (yellow card) 67'; Endl (yellow card) 90'	Report	Tecl 18'; Douděra 28'; Texl 36' (o.g.); Ousou (red card) 58'; Tiéhi 75'	Stadium: ADAX Invest Arena; Attendance: 10,200; Referee: Tomáš Klíma

31 August 2022 6	Baník Ostrava	1–2	Zbrojovka Brno	Ostrava
17:30 CEST (UTC+2)	Šehić (yellow card) 22'; Smékal 60'; Sanneh (yellow card) 86'; Kuzmanović (yellow card) 90+2'	Report	Ševčík (yellow card) 65'; Řezníček 83'; Fousek 90'	Stadium: Městský stadion Attendance: 7,277; Referee: Pavel Orel

4 September 2022 7	Zbrojovka Brno	1–2	Bohemians 1905	Brno
16:00 CEST (UTC+2)	Hrabina (yellow card) 40'; Jakub Šural (yellow card) 45+1'; Ševčík 48'; Endl (yellow card) 85'	Report	Puškáč 3' (pen.); Křapka 40'; Puškáč (yellow card) 41'	Stadium: ADAX Invest Arena; Attendance: 5,526; Referee: Michal Křepský

10 September 2022 8	Zlín	2–3	Zbrojovka Brno	Zlín
16:00 CEST (UTC+2)	Didiba (yellow card) 50'; Janetzký 68'; Dramé 82'; Silný (yellow card) 90+6'	Report	Řezníček 19', 50' (pen.); Řezníček (yellow card) 27'; Didiba 59' (o.g.); Granečný (yellow card) 62'; Souček (yellow card) 66'; Berkovec (yellow card) 84'	Stadium: Letná Stadion; Attendance: 3,209; Referee: Petr Hocek

17 September 2022 9	Zbrojovka Brno	2–2	Teplice	Brno
16:00 CEST (UTC+2)	Alli 19'; Ševčík 37'	Report	Jukl 8'; Kučera (yellow card) 24'; Kučera 45+3'; Hyčka (yellow card) 57'	Stadium: ADAX Invest Arena; Attendance: 4,118; Referee: Tomáš Batík

2 October 2022 10	Jablonec	3–1	Zbrojovka Brno	Jablonec nad Nisou
16:00 CEST (UTC+2)	Chramosta 17', 67'; Houska (yellow card) 38'; Jovović 61'	Report	Řezníček 59'	Stadium: Stadion Střelnice; Attendance: 2,189; Referee: Jan Všetečka

8 October 2022 11	Zbrojovka Brno	0–4	Sparta Praha	Brno
16:00 CEST (UTC+2)	Řezníček (yellow card) 65'; Alli (yellow card) 73'	Report	Krejčí 33' (pen.), 82'; Kuchta 45+4', 90+9'; Daněk (yellow card) 68'; Mejdr (yellow card) 75'; Vitík (yellow card) 78'	Stadium: ADAX Invest Arena; Attendance: 9,588; Referee: Petr Hocek

15 October 2022 12	Hradec Králové	2–1	Zbrojovka Brno	Mladá Boleslav
16:00 CEST (UTC+2)	Kodeš (yellow card) 22'; Rada 43'; Leibl (yellow card) 45+2'; Vašulín 88'	Report	Řezníček 29'; Souček (yellow card) after match'	Stadium: Lokotrans Aréna; Attendance: 801; Referee: Jan Petřík

22 October 2022 13	Pardubice	1–3	Zbrojovka Brno	Prague
16:00 CEST (UTC+2)	Černý (yellow card) 23'; Mareš 80'; Vlček (yellow card) 90+2'	Report	Řezníček 40', 50', 74'; Berkovec (yellow card) 86'; Pachlopník (yellow card) 90+2'	Stadium: Ďolíček; Attendance: 877; Referee: Ladislav Szikszay

30 October 2022 14	Zbrojovka Brno	3–0	Slovan Liberec	Brno
15:00 CEST (UTC+2)	Souček (yellow card) 45'; Šural 51'; Ševčík 59'; Řezníček 72'; Ševčík (yellow card) 80'	Report	Kozák (yellow card) 70'	Stadium: ADAX Invest Arena; Attendance: 4,511; Referee: Dominik Starý

5 November 2022 15	České Budějovice	3–2	Zbrojovka Brno	České Budějovice
15:00 CEST (UTC+2)	Havel 45+2'; Hlavica 59' (o.g.); Hora 82' (pen.)	Report	Ševčík 47'; Hlavica (yellow card) 81'; Texl 85'; Blecha (yellow card) 90+2'	Stadium: Stadion Střelecký ostrov Attendance: 2,475; Referee: Lukáš Nehasil

9 November 2022 4	Viktoria Plzeň	4–0	Zbrojovka Brno	Plzeň
17:00 CEST (UTC+2)	Vlkanova 24'; Chorý 53'; Chorý 79' (pen.); Bassey 89'	Report	Jakub Šural (yellow card) 72'; Endl (yellow card) 77'; Rogožan (yellow card) 88'	Stadium: Doosan Arena; Attendance: 8,436; Referee: Jan Všetečka

13 November 2022 16	Zbrojovka Brno	2–3	Sigma Olomouc	Brno
18:00 CEST (UTC+2)	Souček (yellow card) 27'; Řezníček 34'; Alli (yellow card) 55'; Pachlopník 66'	Report	Zmrzlý 9'; Chvátal (yellow card) 29'; Breite (yellow card) 42'; Breite 45'; Spáčil (yellow card) 59'; Navrátil 78'	Stadium: ADAX Invest Arena; Attendance: 4,618; Referee: Dalibor Černý

19 January 2023 17	Mladá Boleslav	0–0	Zbrojovka Brno	Mladá Boleslav
15:00 CEST (UTC+2)	Suchomel (yellow card) 45+5'; Mareček (yellow card) 82'; Kubista (yellow card) 90+2'	Report	Hrabina (yellow card) 57'	Stadium: Lokotrans Aréna; Attendance: 1,064; Referee: Tomáš Batík

5 February 2023 18	Zbrojovka Brno	1–3	Viktoria Plzeň	Brno
15:00 CEST (UTC+2)	Ševčík 9'; Divíšek (red card) 75'; Ševčík (yellow card) 78'; Šural (yellow card) 79'	Report	Hejda (yellow card) 24'; N'Diaye (yellow card) 40'; Květ (yellow card) 45+2'; Bucha 59'; Kopic 69'; Vlkanova 90+7'	Stadium: ADAX Invest Arena; Attendance: 5,018; Referee: Pavel Orel

11 February 2023 19	Slavia Praha	2–0	Zbrojovka Brno	Prague
18:00 CEST (UTC+2)	Lingr (yellow card) 53'; Ewerton 58'; Ewerton (yellow card) 80'; van Buren 85'	Report	Granečný (yellow card) 14'; Texl (yellow card) 31'; Šural (yellow card) 82'	Stadium: Fortuna Arena; Attendance: 12,564; Referee: Dominik Starý

13 February 2023 20	Zbrojovka Brno	2–1	Baník Ostrava	Brno
15:00 CEST (UTC+2)	Řezníček 9', 65'; Endl (yellow card) 56'; Berkovec (yellow card) 84'; Šural (yellow card) 90'	Report	Pojezný (yellow card) 45+1'; Plavšić (yellow card) 57'; Juroška (yellow card) 63'; Šín 80'; Fleišman (yellow card) 90+4'	Stadium: ADAX Invest Arena; Attendance: 6,814; Referee: Jan Machálek

25 February 2023 21	Bohemians 1905	1–1	Zbrojovka Brno	Prague
15:00 CEST (UTC+2)	Prekop 50'; Kadlec (yellow card) 77'	Report	Granečný (yellow card) 53'; Řezníček 70'	Stadium: Ďolíček; Attendance: 4,079; Referee: Jan Všetečka

4 March 2023 22	Zbrojovka Brno	1–1	Zlín	Brno
15:00 CEST (UTC+2)	Texl (yellow card) 70'; Šural (yellow card) 78'; Řezníček 87'	Report	Procházka 9'; Kozák (yellow card) 53'; Procházka (yellow card) 54'	Stadium: ADAX Invest Arena; Attendance: 4,522; Referee: Marek Radina

12 March 2023 23	Teplice	1–1	Zbrojovka Brno	Teplice
15:00 CEST (UTC+2)	Pleštil 53'; Sy (yellow card) 90'; Grigar (yellow card) 90+6'	Report	Hlavica (yellow card) 82'; Řezníček 90+6' (pen.); Pachlopník (yellow card) 90+7'	Stadium: Na Stínadlech; Attendance: 2,561; Referee: Ladislav Szikszay

19 March 2023 24	Zbrojovka Brno	1–2	Jablonec	Brno
15:00 CEST (UTC+2)	Nečas (yellow card) 2'; Alli 40'; Tijani (yellow card) 51'; Granečný (yellow card) 79'; Šural (yellow card) 90+1'	Report	Polidar (yellow card) 8'; Hübschman (yellow card) 15'; Chramosta 47'; Martinec (yellow card) 61'; Považanec 67'; Sejk (yellow card) 73'	Stadium: ADAX Invest Arena; Attendance: 4,026; Referee: Tomáš Batík

2 April 2023 25	Sparta Praha	3–1	Zbrojovka Brno	Prague
16:00 CEST (UTC+2)	Krejčí 20'; Kuchta 24'; Wiesner 49'; Kairinen (yellow card) 65'; Sadílek (yellow card) 89'; Jankto (yellow card) 89'	Report	Řezníček 17'; Hlavica (yellow card) 28'; Divíšek (yellow card) 52'; Šural (yellow card) 88'	Stadium: Stadion Letná; Attendance: 17,288; Referee: Marek Radina

8 April 2023 26	Zbrojovka Brno	1–2	Hradec Králové	Brno
16:00 CEST (UTC+2)	Alli 19'; Texl (yellow card) 26'; Alli (yellow card) 90'	Report	Kubala (yellow card) 26'; Vašulín 40'; Klíma (yellow card) 46'; Ryneš 50'; Harazim (yellow card) 84'; Dvořák (yellow card) 89'; Hejkal (yellow card) 90+1' (coach)	Stadium: ADAX Invest Arena; Attendance: 3,155; Referee: Jan Všetečka

16 April 2023 27	Zbrojovka Brno	2–1	Pardubice	Brno
16:00 CEST (UTC+2)	Řezníček 47', 76'	Report	Pikul (yellow card) 75'; Krobot 90+3'	Stadium: ADAX Invest Arena; Attendance: 5,025; Referee: Pavel Orel

23 April 2023 28	Liberec	3–1	Zbrojovka Brno	Liberec
16:00 CEST (UTC+2)	Frýdek 23', 34'; Tupta 29'; Ghali (yellow card) 89'	Report	Hlavica (yellow card) 45+1'; Rondić 89' (o.g.)	Stadium: Stadion u Nisy; Attendance: 1,658; Referee: Jan Petřík

26 April 2023 29	Zbrojovka Brno	1–1	České Budějovice	Brno
17:30 CEST (UTC+2)	Ševčík 31'; Řezníček (yellow card) 37'	Report	Čmelík (yellow card) 35'; Čoudek (yellow card) 63'; Čermák (yellow card) 82'; Čermák 90+3'	Stadium: ADAX Invest Arena; Attendance: 4,118; Referee: Michal Křepský

30 April 2023 30	Slovácko	1–0	Zbrojovka Brno	Uherské Hradiště
15:00 CEST (UTC+2)	Reinberk 24'; Reinberk (yellow card) 60'	Report	Hrabina (yellow card) 26'; Souček (red card) 87'	Stadium: Městský fotbalový stadion Miroslava Valenty; Attendance: 5,224; Referee: Jan Všetečka

==== Relegation group ====
===== League table =====
Pos	Team	Pld	W	D	L	GF	GA	GD	Pts	Qualification or relegation	OST	TEP	JAB	PCE	ZLN	BRN
11	Baník Ostrava	35	11	9	15	53	50	+3	42		—	2–1	—	2–4	—	4–0
12	Teplice	35	11	9	15	45	67	−22	42		—	—	—	1–0	2–1	1–1
13	Jablonec	35	10	10	15	49	63	−14	40		1–1	0–2	—	—	—	1–0
14	Pardubice (O)	35	11	4	20	38	63	−25	37	Qualification for the relegation play-offs	—	—	2–0	—	1–2	—
15	Trinity Zlín (O)	35	7	13	15	43	60	−17	34	Qualification for the relegation play-offs	2–1	—	1–1	—	—	—
16	Zbrojovka Brno (R)	35	8	9	18	41	64	−23	33	Relegation to FNL	—	—	—	0–2	0–0	—

Source: Fortuna Liga
Rules for classification: 1) Total points; 2) Points earned in regular season; 3) Head-to-head points (regular season); 4) Head-to-head goal difference (regular season); 5) Head-to-head goals scored (regular season); 5) Goal difference (all matches); 6) Goals scored (all matches); 7) Fair-play ranking; 8) Draw.
(O) Play-off winners; (R) Relegated

===== Results =====
6 May 2023 1	Baník Ostrava	4–0	Zbrojovka Brno	Ostrava
15:00 CEST (UTC+2)	Cadu 10'; Muhamed Tijani 32'; Plavšić 38'; Juroška 62'	Report	Granečný (yellow card) 59'; Mohamed Tijani (yellow card) 74'	Stadium: Městský stadion Attendance: 6,117; Referee: Pavel Orel

14 May 2023 2	Zbrojovka Brno	0–2	Pardubice	Brno
15:00 CEST (UTC+2)	Štěrba (yellow card) 77'	Report	Hlavatý (yellow card) 24'; Chlumecký 34'; Nita (yellow card) 74'; Krobot 90+5'	Stadium: ADAX Invest Arena; Attendance: 5,218; Referee: Ladislav Szikszay

21 May 2023 3	Jablonec	1–0	Zbrojovka Brno	Jablonec nad Nisou
15:00 CEST (UTC+2)	Štěpánek (yellow card) 5'; Král 28'; Ikaunieks (yellow card) 90+3'	Report	Blecha (yellow card) 90'	Stadium: Stadion Střelnice; Attendance: 1,554; Referee: Marek Radina

24 May 2023 4	Teplice	1–1	Zbrojovka Brno	Teplice
19:00 CEST (UTC+2)	Mucha (yellow card) 15'; Fila 58'; Vachoušek (yellow card) 81'	Report	Texl 17'	Stadium: Na Stínadlech; Attendance: 3,046; Referee: Dominik Starý

28 May 2023 5	Zbrojovka Brno	0–0	Zlín	Brno
17:00 CEST (UTC+2)		Report	Dostál (yellow card) 90+4'	Stadium: ADAX Invest Arena; Attendance: 7,528; Referee: Ondřej Berka

=== Czech Cup ===
==== Results ====
14 September 2023 Second round	Slovan Rosice	0–4	Zbrojovka Brno	Rosice, Czech Republic
16:30 CEST (UTC+2)		Report	Blecha 24'; Nečas 31'; Texl 63'; Rogožan 69'	Stadium: Stadion FC Slovan Rosice; Attendance: 920; Referee: Stansilav Volek

19 October 2022 Third round	Táborsko	1–2	Zbrojovka Brno	Tábor, Czech Republic
15:00 CEST (UTC+2)	Ledecký 59'; Mezera (yellow card) 65'	Report	Šural (yellow card) 53'; Alli 88'; Ševčík 90'	Stadium: Stadion v Kvapilově ulici Attendance: 400; Referee: Ladislav Szikszay

17 November 2022 Round of 16	FK Teplice	2–3	Zbrojovka Brno	Teplice, Czech Republic
17:00 CEST (UTC+2)	Hybš 10'; Hyčka (yellow card) 13'; Mareček (yellow card) 43'; Hyčka 80'; Tsykalo (yellow card) 120+2'	Report	Přichystal 1'; Souček (yellow card) 25'; Endl (red card) 84'; Hladík (yellow card) 85'; Řezníček 90+3' (pen.), 107'	Stadium: AGC Arena Na Stínadlech; Attendance: 1,389; Referee: Michal Křepský

1 March 2023 Quarter-finals	České Budějovice	2–1	Zbrojovka Brno	České Budějovice
17:00 CEST (UTC+2)	Zajíc 19', 43'	Report	Hrabina (yellow card) 39'; Divíšek 90'	Stadium: Stadion Střelecký ostrov Attendance: 952; Referee: Petr Hocek

== Squad statistics ==
=== Appearances and goals ===
No.	Pos	Nat	Player	Total		Fortuna Liga		MOL Cup	
No.	Pos	Nat	Player	Apps	Goals	Apps	Goals	Apps	Goals
Goalkeepers
40	GK	(Czech Republic) CZE	Vlastimil Hrubý	2	0	1	0	1	0
53	GK	(Czech Republic) CZE	Martin Berkovec	33	0	32	0	1	0
71	GK	(Czech Republic) CZE	Jakub Šiman	4	0	2	0	2	0
Defenders
3	DF	(Benin) BEN	Mohamed Tijani	13	0	12+1	0	0	0
4	DF	(Czech Republic) CZE	Jan Hlavica	27	0	16+8	0	3	0
6	DF	(Czech Republic) CZE	Lukáš Endl	22	0	20	0	2	0
15	DF	(Czech Republic) CZE	Jan Štěrba	9	0	6+1	0	2	0
16	DF	(Slovakia) SVK	Róbert Matejov	15	1	7+5	1	3	0
18	DF	(Czech Republic) CZE	Denis Granečný	31	0	25+3	0	1+2	0
22	DF	(Czech Republic) CZE	Matěj Hrabina	33	0	27+3	0	2+1	0
23	DF	(Czech Republic) CZE	Jakub Šural	26	1	24	1	2	0
24	DF	(Czech Republic) CZE	Josef Divíšek	16	1	6+7	0	2+1	1
35	DF	(Czech Republic) CZE	Josef Koželuh	9	0	7+1	0	0+1	0
Midfielders
7	MF	(Czech Republic) CZE	Ondřej Pachlopník	17	2	2+12	2	3	0
10	MF	(Czech Republic) CZE	Šimon Falta	29	0	18+9	0	2	0
11	MF	(Czech Republic) CZE	Adam Fousek	25	1	5+18	1	1+1	0
13	MF	(Czech Republic) CZE	Jiří Texl	37	2	31+3	1	2+1	1
17	MF	(Nigeria) NGA	Wale Musa Alli	38	4	27+8	3	2+1	1
19	MF	(Czech Republic) CZE	Michal Ševčík	37	10	31+3	9	2+1	1
21	MF	(Czech Republic) CZE	Filip Blecha	25	1	7+15	0	1+2	1
25	MF	(Czech Republic) CZE	Jakub Nečas	18	1	6+10	0	2	1
27	MF	(Czech Republic) CZE	Filip Souček	23	1	19+1	1	2+1	0
Forwards
8	FW	(Czech Republic) CZE	Lukáš Rogožan	17	1	0+13	0	1+3	1
20	FW	(Czech Republic) CZE	Jan Hladík	34	0	16+15	0	1+2	0
37	FW	(Czech Republic) CZE	Jakub Řezníček	38	21	33+2	19	1+2	2
Players transferred/loaned out during the season
	MF	(Czech Republic) CZE	David Jambor	1	0	0+1	0	0	0
	MF	(Czech Republic) CZE	Oldřich Pragr	0	0	0	0	0	0
	MF	(Czech Republic) CZE	Ota Kohoutek	0	0	0	0	0	0
	FW	(Czech Republic) CZE	Jakub Přichystal	11	2	5+4	1	2	1

Last updated: 29 May 2023
Source: Competitions

=== Goal Scorers ===
Place	Pos.	Name	Fortuna liga	Czech Cup	Total
1	FW	(Czech Republic) Jakub Řezníček	19	2	21
2	MF	(Czech Republic) Michal Ševčík	9	1	10
3	MF	(Nigeria) Wale Musa Alli	3	1	4
4	MF	(Czech Republic) Jiří Texl	2	1	3
5	FW	(Czech Republic) Jakub Přichystal	1	1	2
6	MF	(Czech Republic) Adam Fousek	1	0	1
6	DF	(Czech Republic) Jakub Šural	1	0	1
6	MF	(Czech Republic) Ondřej Pachlopník	1	0	1
6	MF	(Czech Republic) Filip Souček	1	0	1
6	DF	(Slovakia) Róbert Matejov	1	0	1
6	MF	(Czech Republic) Filip Blecha	0	1	1
6	MF	(Czech Republic) Jakub Nečas	0	1	1
6	FW	(Czech Republic) Lukáš Rogožan	0	1	1
6	DF	(Czech Republic) Josef Divíšek	0	1	1
Own goals			2	0	2
TOTAL			41	10	51

Last updated: 29 May 2023
Source: Competitions

=== Assists ===
Place	Pos.	Name	Fortuna liga	Czech Cup	Total
1	MF	(Czech Republic) Michal Ševčík	6	3	9
2	MF	(Nigeria) Wale Musa Alli	6	1	7
3	MF	(Czech Republic) Šimon Falta	2	2	4
4	FW	(Czech Republic) Jakub Řezníček	3	0	3
4	MF	(Czech Republic) Adam Fousek	2	1	3
6	FW	(Czech Republic) Jan Hladík	3	0	3
6	MF	(Czech Republic) Jiří Texl	2	0	2
6	DF	(Czech Republic) Denis Granečný	1	1	2
6	DF	(Czech Republic) Matěj Hrabina	1	1	2
10	MF	(Czech Republic) Filip Souček	1	0	1
10	FW	(Czech Republic) Lukáš Rogožan	0	1	1
TOTAL			27	10	37

Last updated: 29 May 2023
Source: Competitions

=== Clean sheets ===
Place	Pos.	Name	Fortuna liga	Czech Cup	Total
1	GK	(Czech Republic) Martin Berkovec	4	0	4
2	GK	(Czech Republic) Jakub Šiman	0	1	1
3	GK	(Czech Republic) Vlastimil Hrubý	0	0	0
TOTAL			4	1	5

Last updated: 29 May 2023
Source: Competitions

=== Disciplinary record ===
Position	Name	Fortuna Liga		Czech Cup		Total	
Position	Name	Booked	Sent off (straight red)	Booked	Sent off (straight red)	Booked	Sent off (straight red)
MF	(Czech Republic) Michal Ševčík	0	0	0	0	0	0
MF	(Czech Republic) Michal Ševčík	0	0	0	0	0	0
Players away on loan:
Players who left Zbrojovka during the season:
	TOTALS	0	0	0	0	0	0

Last updated: 30 March 2023
Source: Competitions
