= Šural =

Šural is a surname. Notable people with the surname include:

- Jakub Šural (born 1996), Czech football player
- Josef Šural (1990–2019), Czech football player
