= Martin Doležal =

Martin Doležal may refer to:

- Martin Doležal (footballer, born 1980), Czech football goalkeeper
- Martin Doležal (footballer, born 1990), Czech football forward
