= Aleš Hellebrand =

Czech footballer

Personal information
- Date of birth: 27 August 1974 (age 52)
- Place of birth: Czechoslovakia
- Height: 1.79 m (5 ft 10 in)
- Positions: Defender; midfielder

Senior career*
Years	Team	Apps	(Gls)
1993	Baník Ostrava	1	(0)
1993–1995	Znojmo		
1995–1996	Baník Ostrava B		
1996–1998	Opava	44	(0)
1999	Ostrava-Jih	14	(1)
1999	Senec	14	(0)
2000–2001	Ružomberok	40	(3)
2001–2005	Petržalka	78	(4)
- Provodov
- * Club domestic league appearances and goals

Aleš Hellebrand (born 27 August 1974) is a Czech former footballer who is last known to have played as a defender or midfielder for Provodov.

== Early life ==
Hellebrand was born in 1974 in Opava, Czechoslovakia, and debuted with Baník in the Czech top flight.

== Playing career ==
Hellebrand helped Opava achieve promotion to the Czech top flight, before becoming a "big name" in Slovakia, helping Slovak side Petržalka win their first league title. In total, he made 177 appearances in the Czech and Slovak top flights combined during his career. At the age of thirty-one, he retired from professional football for personal reasons.

== Style of play ==
Hellebrand mainly operated as a defender or midfielder and was known for his work ethic.

== Managerial career ==
After retiring from professional football, Hellebrand worked as a youth manager.

== Post-playing career ==
After retiring from professional football, Hellebrand worked as a manager at a construction company.

== Personal life ==
Hellebrand is the father of Czech footballers Patrik Hellebrand and Jan Hellebrand.
