= Táborsko =

Táborsko may refer to:

- 17607 Táborsko, an asteroid
- FC Silon Táborsko, a Czech football club
