= David Jambor =

Czech footballer

Personal information
- Full name: David Jambor
- Date of birth: 31 January 2003 (age 23)
- Place of birth: Nové Město na Moravě, Czech Republic
- Height: 1.80 m (5 ft 11 in)
- Position: Midfielder

Team information
- Current team: Chrudim
- Number: 6

Youth career
- 2009−2020: Zbrojovka Brno

Senior career*
Years	Team	Apps	(Gls)
2020−2025	Zbrojovka Brno	41	(0)
2021	→ Vyškov (loan)	11	(2)
2022−2023	→ Vyškov (loan)	12	(0)
2025−	Chrudim	28	(1)

International career^{‡}
2017−2018	Czech Republic U-15	11	(4)
2018−2019	Czech Republic U-16	6	(0)
2019−2020	Czech Republic U-17	9	(0)
2021	Czech Republic U-19	8	(0)
2022−	Czech Republic U-20	3	(0)
- * Club domestic league appearances and goals as of 28 May 2026 ‡ National team caps and goals as of 14 September 2023 (UTC)

David Jambor (born 31 March 2003) is a Czech footballer who currently plays as a midfielder for Chrudim. His older brother Dan Jambor is also footballer.

== Club career ==
=== FC Zbrojovka Brno ===
He made his professional debut for Zbrojovka Brno in the away match against Fastav Zlín on 13 September 2020, which ended in a loss 1:3. After 74 minutes he replaced Adam Fousek.

== Career statistics ==
=== Club ===
As of match played 11 November 2021.

Club	Season	League			National cup		Total	
Club	Season	Division	Apps	Goals	Apps	Goals	Apps	Goals
Zbrojovka Brno	2020–21	Fortuna liga	7	0	1	0	8	0
Zbrojovka Brno	Total		7	0	1	0	8	0
Vyškov (loan)	2021–22	Fortuna národní liga	11	2	2	0	13	2
Career total			18	2	3	0	21	2
