= Lutín =

- Municipality
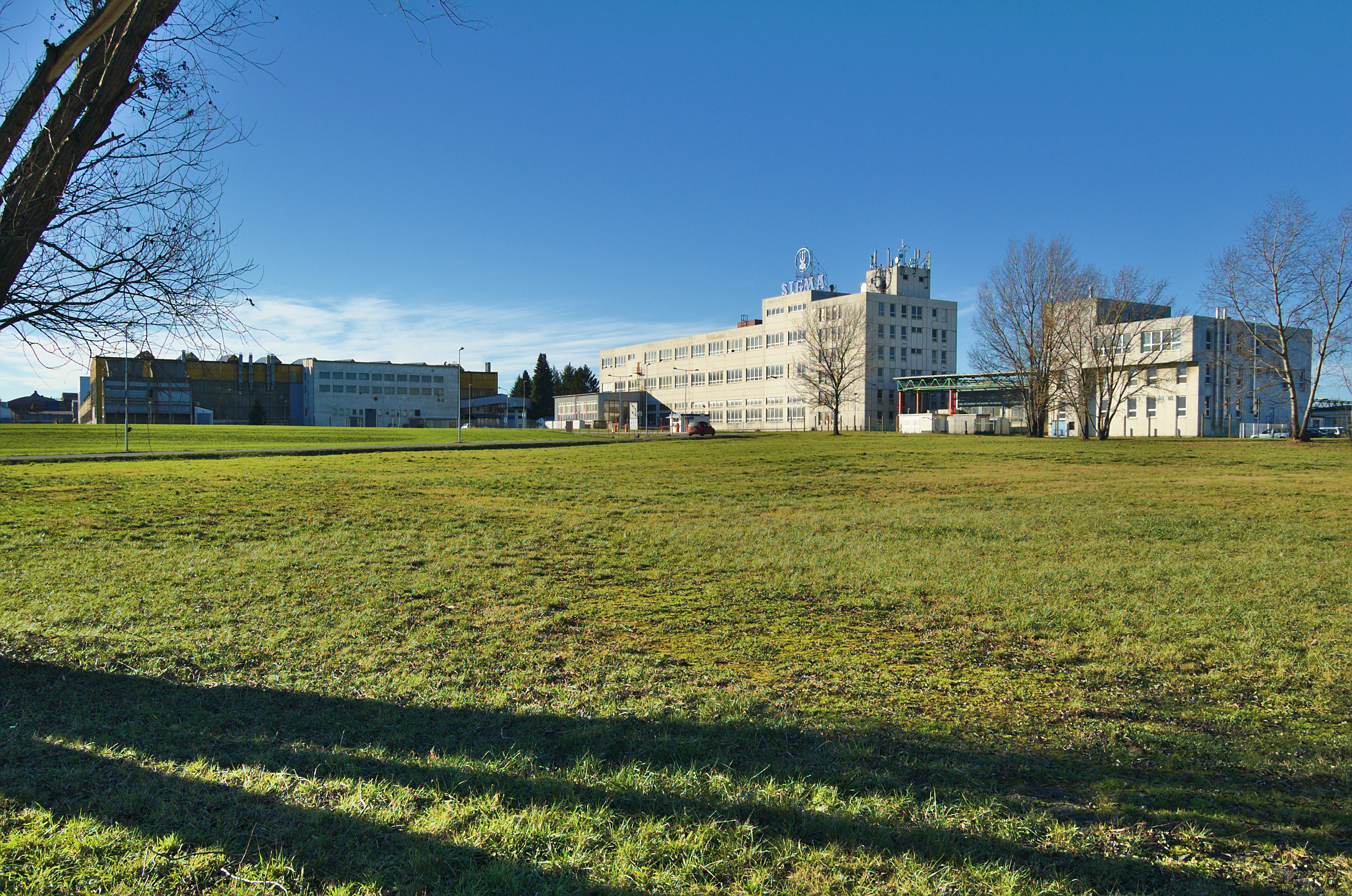
- Sigma Lutín factory

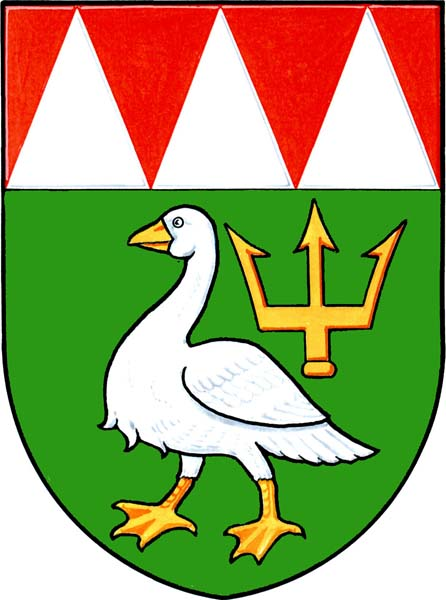
- Flag Coat of arms

- Location in the Czech Republic
- Coordinates: 49°33′30″N 17°8′9″E
- Country: Czech Republic
- Region: Olomouc
- District: Olomouc
- First mentioned: 1234

Area
  - Total: 8.20 km^{2} (3.17 sq mi)
- Elevation: 236 m (774 ft)

Population (2026-01-01)
  - Total: 3,076
  - Density: 375/km^{2} (972/sq mi)
- Time zone: UTC+1 (CET)
  - Summer (DST): UTC+2 (CEST)
- Postal codes: 783 42, 783 49
- Website: www.lutin.cz

Lutín (Czech pronunciation: [ˈluciːn]) is a municipality and village in Olomouc District in the Olomouc Region of the Czech Republic. It has about 3,100 inhabitants.

== Administrative division ==
Lutín consists of two municipal parts (in brackets population according to the 2021 census):

- Lutín (2,270)
- Třebčín (773)

== Geography ==
Lutín is located about 8 kilometres (5 mi) southwest of Olomouc. It lies in a flat agricultural landscape in the Upper Morava Valley.

== History ==
The first written mention of Lutín is from 1234. Třebčín was first mentioned in 1131. Until the establishment of an independent municipality in 1850, Lutín was continuously a property of the bishopric and later archbishopric in Olomouc.

== Demographics ==
Historical population

Year	Pop.	±%
1869	772	—
1880	841	+8.9%
1890	878	+4.4%
1900	888	+1.1%
1910	935	+5.3%

Year	Pop.	±%
1921	975	+4.3%
1930	1,165	+19.5%
1950	1,897	+62.8%
1961	2,065	+8.9%
1970	2,356	+14.1%

Year	Pop.	±%
1980	2,459	+4.4%
1991	3,331	+35.5%
2001	3,211	−3.6%
2011	3,103	−3.4%
2021	3,043	−1.9%

Source: Censuses

== Economy ==
Lutín has a tradition of pumpmaking industry. A pumpmaking manufacture was founded here by Ludvík Sigmund in 1868 and later became the biggest producer of pumps in the country. Since 1965, the company has been known as Sigma Lutín. In 1966, the company became a sponsor of the club SK Sigma Olomouc.

== Transport ==
The village of Třebčín is located on the railway line Prostějov–Červenka.

== Sights ==
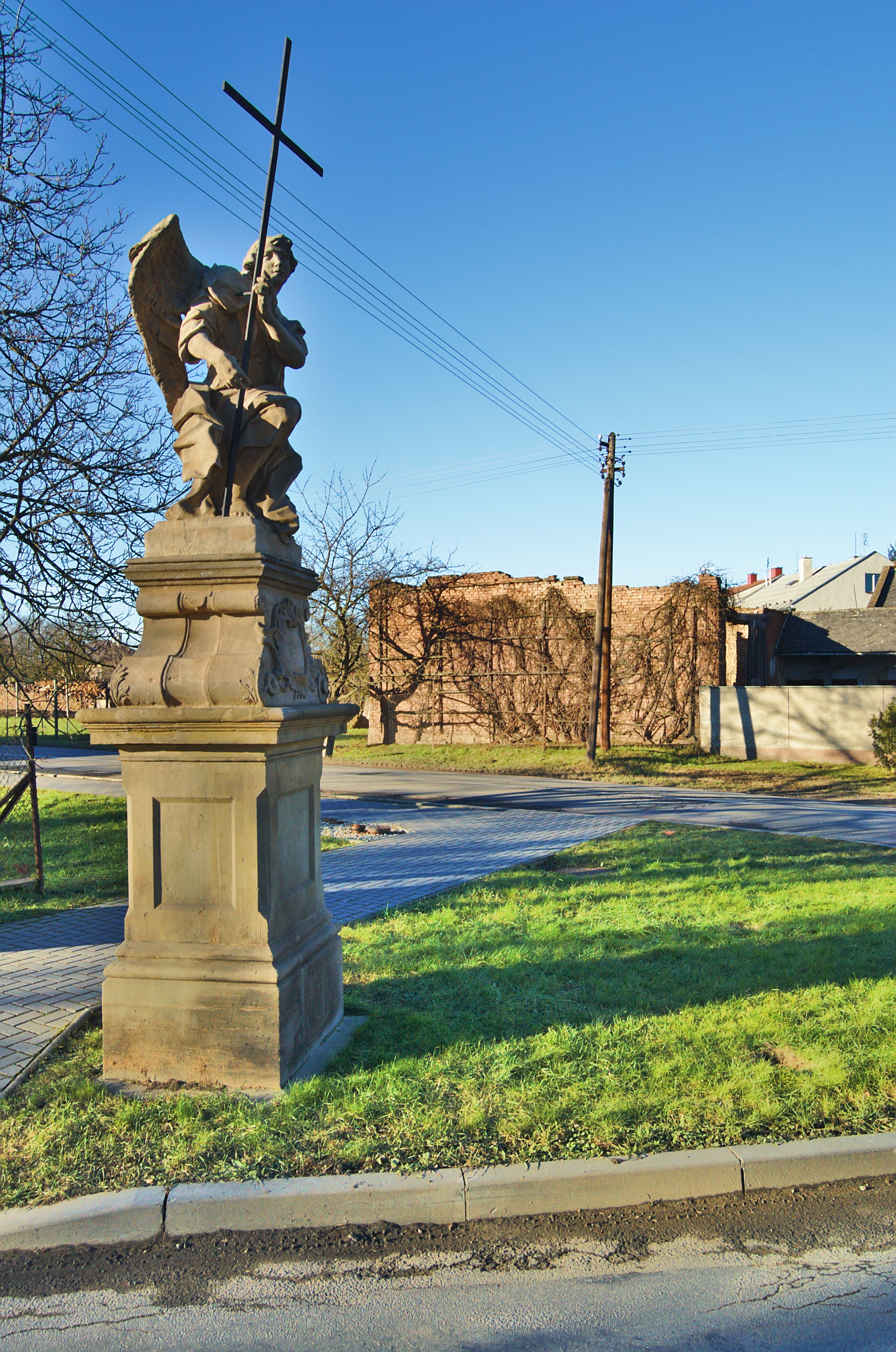
Statue of an angel

There are two protected cultural monuments in the municipality: a late Baroque statue of an angel from the 1730s and the Chapel of Saint Florian from the beginning of the 19th century.
