= Jan Hellebrand =

Czech footballer

Personal information
- Date of birth: 2 March 2002 (age 24)
- Place of birth: Zlín, Czech Republic
- Height: 1.77 m (5 ft 10 in)
- Position: Midfielder

Youth career
- 2009−2019: Zlín

Senior career*
Years	Team	Apps	(Gls)
2019−2023	Zlín B	43	(5)
2019−2023	Zlín	12	(0)
2023−2026	Zbrojovka Brno	11	(0)

International career
2017	Czech Republic U15	2	(0)
2017−2018	Czech Republic U16	14	(0)
2018−2019	Czech Republic U17	17	(0)
2019	Czech Republic U18	2	(0)
2019−2020	Czech Republic U19	3	(0)
- * Club domestic league appearances and goals as of 25 June 2025

Jan Hellebrand (born 2 March 2002) is a Czech former footballer who last played as a midfielder for FC Zbrojovka Brno.

== Club career ==
=== FC Zlín ===
Hellebrand made his professional debut for Zlín in the home match against Viktoria Plzeň on 5 March 2022, which ended in a loss 1–2. At the Grassroots gala, organized by FAČR, he was announced as the third best Czech player for 2018 in the U17 category.

=== FC Zbrojovka Brno ===
On 8 September 2023, he was transferred to Zbrojovka Brno, where he signed a contract until 2026. Zlín has a buy-back option on the player.

== Personal life ==
His father is former player Aleš Hellebrand. His older brother Patrik Hellebrand is also professional footballer. Younger brothers, twins Filip and Tomáš, play for Zlín at youth level.
