= Jakub Rezek =

Czech footballer (born 1998)

Personal information
- Date of birth: 29 May 1998 (age 28)
- Place of birth: Uherský Brod, Czech Republic
- Height: 1.74 m (5 ft 9 in)
- Position: Midfielder

Team information
- Current team: Silon Táborsko
- Number: 24

Youth career
- Uherský Brod
- Slovácko
- Zlín
- Olomouc
- 2014–2016: Slovácko

Senior career*
Years	Team	Apps	(Gls)
2016–2022	Slovácko	45	(0)
2019–2020	→ Vysočina Jihlava (loan)	15	(0)
2021–2022	→ Hradec Králové (loan)	2	(0)
2022	→ Pardubice (loan)	12	(1)
2022–2023	Karviná	24	(2)
2023–2025	Opava	62	(6)
2026–	Silon Táborsko	11	(0)

International career
2013–2014	Czech Republic U16	5	(2)
2014–2015	Czech Republic U17	10	(2)
2015–2016	Czech Republic U18	4	(0)
2016–2017	Czech Republic U19	6	(1)
2017–2018	Czech Republic U20	2	(0)
- * Club domestic league appearances and goals as of 24 May 2026

Jakub Rezek (born 29 May 1998) is a Czech professional footballer who plays as a midfielder for Silon Táborsko in the Czech First League.

== Career ==
Rezek made his senior league debut for Slovácko on 18 March 2017 in a Czech First League 2–1 home win against Mladá Boleslav.

== Honours ==
MFK Karviná

- Czech National Football League: 2022–23
