= Denis Alijagić =

Footballer (born 2003)

Personal information
- Date of birth: 10 April 2003 (age 23)
- Place of birth: Prague, Czech Republic
- Height: 1.88 m (6 ft 2 in)
- Position: Forward

Youth career
- Sparta Prague
- Český Lev - Union Beroun
- 2014–2020: Slavia Prague

Senior career*
Years	Team	Apps	(Gls)
2020–2022	Slavia Prague	0	(0)
2021	→ Vlašim (loan)	14	(11)
2022	→ Slovan Liberec (loan)	5	(0)
2022–2023	Olympiacos B	2	(0)
2023	→ Maribor (loan)	3	(0)
2023–2024	Zbrojovka Brno	22	(9)
2024–2026	Žilina	12	(2)
2025	→ Pardubice (loan)	6	(0)
2026	Žilina B	7	(0)

International career^{‡}
2017	Czech Republic U15	4	(0)
2019	Bosnia and Herzegovina U17	7	(5)
2020	Bosnia and Herzegovina U18	2	(0)
2021	Bosnia and Herzegovina U19	2	(1)
2021–2022	Czech Republic U19	4	(2)
2022–	Czech Republic U20	8	(2)
2022–	Czech Republic U21	2	(1)
- * Club domestic league appearances and goals as of 25 May 2026 ‡ National team caps and goals as of 20 November 2023

Denis Alijagić (born 10 April 2003) is a Czech professional footballer who plays as a forward. Born in the Czech Republic, he has represented both the Czech Republic and Bosnia and Herzegovina internationally at youth level.

== Club career ==
Born in Prague, Alijagić began his career with hometown Sparta Prague at the age of six. Between the ages of eight and ten, he played for Český Lev - Union Beroun, before returning to Sparta. In 2014, he moved to their city rivals Slavia Prague.

In 2021, Alijagić was loaned to Czech National Football League side Vlašim, where he made his senior debut. In the first half of the 2021–22 season, Alijagić scored 11 league goals and four Czech Cup goals, becoming Vlašim's top scorer. On 2 February 2022, he was loaned to Czech First League club Slovan Liberec, where he made five league appearances and failed to score in the process.

On 21 June 2022, Alijagić signed for Greek club Olympiacos. However, he was not assigned to the main squad and played for their B team in the second tier Super League Greece 2, where he made two appearances in the first half of the 2022–23 season. In February 2023, he was loaned to Slovenian PrvaLiga side Maribor for the second part of the 2022–23 season with the option of a loan extension or a permanent buyout.

On 13 February 2025, Alijagić joined Pardubice on a one-year loan deal with option to make transfer permanent.

== International career ==
Alijagić was eligible to represent the Czech Republic through his birthplace, and Bosnia and Herzegovina through his Bosnian father.

In November 2017, Alijagić made his debut for the Czech Republic's under-15 side, making four appearances at the 2017 South American U-15 Championship.

Alijagić then represented Bosnia and Herzegovina at youth level, before switching his national team allegiance back to the Czech Republic at under-19 level in November 2021.

== Style of play ==
Alijagić's manager at Vlašim, Martin Hyský, has praised Alijagić's work rate, speed and his ability to use both feet. Alijagić has compared his own playing style to that of Jamie Vardy.

== Career statistics ==
As of 4 January 2023.

Appearances and goals by club, season and competition
Club	Season	League			National cup		Continental		Total	
Club	Season	Division	Apps	Goals	Apps	Goals	Apps	Goals	Apps	Goals
Slavia Prague	2020–21	Czech First League	0	0	0	0	0	0	0	0
Vlašim (loan)	2021–22	Czech National Football League	14	11	3	4	—		17	15
Slovan Liberec (loan)	2021–22	Czech First League	5	0	—		—		5	0
Olympiacos B	2022–23	Super League Greece 2	2	0	—		—		2	0
Career total			21	11	3	4	0	0	24	15
