= Matěj Hrabina =

Czech footballer (born 1993)

Personal information
- Date of birth: 29 April 1993 (age 33)
- Place of birth: Opava, Czech Republic
- Height: 1.79 m (5 ft 10 in)
- Position: Right back

Team information
- Current team: Pustá Polom
- Number: 22

Youth career
- 2002−2011: Opava

Senior career*
Years	Team	Apps	(Gls)
2011−2021	Opava	192	(3)
2021−2023	Zbrojovka Brno	52	(0)

International career
2009	Czech Republic U16	6	(0)
2009-2010	Czech Republic U17	5	(1)
- * Club domestic league appearances and goals

Matěj Hrabina (born 29 April 1993) is a Czech retired footballer who played as a right back.

== Club career ==
=== FC Zbrojovka Brno ===
He signed for Zbrojovka Brno on 1 July 2021.
