= Martin Toml =

Czech footballer (born 1996)

Personal information
- Full name: Martin Toml
- Date of birth: 25 March 1996 (age 30)
- Place of birth: Brandýs nad Labem-Stará Boleslav, Czech Republic
- Height: 1.88 m (6 ft 2 in)
- Position: Centre-back

Team information
- Current team: Chrudim
- Number: 25

Youth career
- –2014: Sparta Prague

Senior career*
Years	Team	Apps	(Gls)
2015	Sparta Prague B		
2015	→ Vlašim (loan)	12	(0)
2016–2018	Mladá Boleslav	1	(0)
2016	→ Karviná (loan)	1	(0)
2017	→ Táborsko (loan)	13	(1)
2017–2018	→ Žižkov (loan)	19	(1)
2019–2022	Pardubice	104	(7)
2022–2023	ViOn Zlaté Moravce	18	(0)
2023	Zbrojovka Brno	3	(0)
2023–	Chrudim	77	(1)

International career^{‡}
2012–2013	Czech Republic U17	5	(1)
2014–2015	Czech Republic U19	6	(0)
- * Club domestic league appearances and goals as of 28 May 2026 ‡ National team caps and goals as of 31 March 2015

Martin Toml (born 25 March 1996) is a Czech professional footballer who currently plays as a centre back for Chrudim.
