= Vlastimil Hrubý =

Czech footballer

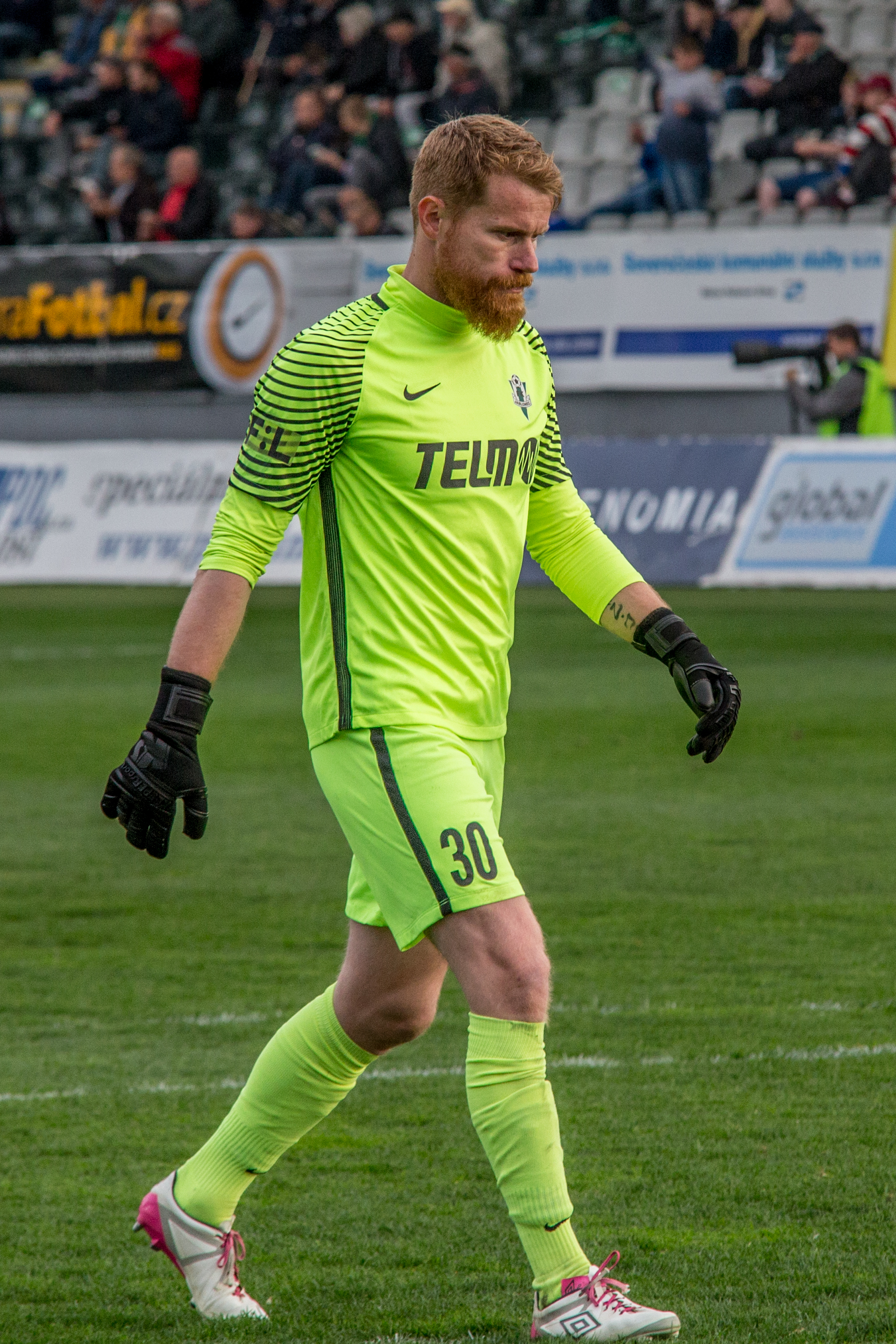

Personal information
- Date of birth: 21 February 1985 (age 41)
- Place of birth: Znojmo, Czechoslovakia
- Height: 1.86 m (6 ft 1 in)
- Position: Goalkeeper

Senior career*
Years	Team	Apps	(Gls)
2009–2014	Znojmo	109	(0)
2014–2022	Jablonec	172	(0)
2022–2024	Zbrojovka Brno	1	(0)
- * Club domestic league appearances and goals as of 17 June 2024

Vlastimil Hrubý (born 21 February 1985) is a Czech former professional football player who played as a goalkeeper.
