= Nicolas Martinek =

Slovak footballer

Personal information
- Date of birth: 30 December 2001 (age 24)
- Place of birth: Ilava, Slovakia
- Height: 1.80 m (5 ft 11 in)
- Position: Midfielder

Team information
- Current team: MŠK Púchov
- Number: 16

Youth career
- −2020: Dubnica nad Váhom

Senior career*
Years	Team	Apps	(Gls)
2020−2023	Dubnica nad Váhom	71	(2)
2023−	Zbrojovka Brno	5	(0)
2024	→ Kroměříž (loan)	7	(1)
2024	→ Púchov (loan)	14	(3)
2025–	Púchov	37	(2)
- * Club domestic league appearances and goals as of 25 May 2026

Nicolas Martinek (born 30 December 2001) is a Slovak footballer who currently plays as a midfielder for MŠK Púchov.

Martinek started his professional career in 2020 with the 2. Liga outfit Dubnica nad Váhom. In July 2023 he signed a two-year contract with Czech National Football League team FC Zbrojovka Brno.

On 21 February 2024, Zbrojovka Brno loaned Martinek to Kroměříž on a half-year loan deal without option to make transfer permanent.
