= Martin Doležal (footballer, born 1980) =

Czech footballer

Personal information
- Date of birth: 18 December 1980 (age 45)
- Place of birth: Prague, Czechoslovakia
- Height: 1.90 m (6 ft 3 in)
- Position: Goalkeeper

Youth career
- 1988–1989: TJ Sokol Bílovice nad Svitavou
- 1989–1992: Bohemians
- 1992–1999: Zbrojovka Brno

Senior career*
| Years | Team | Apps | (Gls) |
| 1999–2016 | Zbrojovka Brno | 54 | (0) |
| 2005 | → Kohoutovice (loan) | | |
| 2005–2009 | → HFK Olomouc (loan) | 99 | (0) |
| 2010–2011 | → MAS Táborsko (loan) | 20 | (0) |
| 2012–2014 | → Líšeň (loan) | 11 | (0) |
| 2015 | → Třebíč (loan) | 14 | (0) |
- * Club domestic league appearances and goals as of 14 August 2015

Martin Doležal (born 18 December 1980) is a Czech former football player who played as a goalkeeper.
