= Josef Divíšek =

Czech footballer

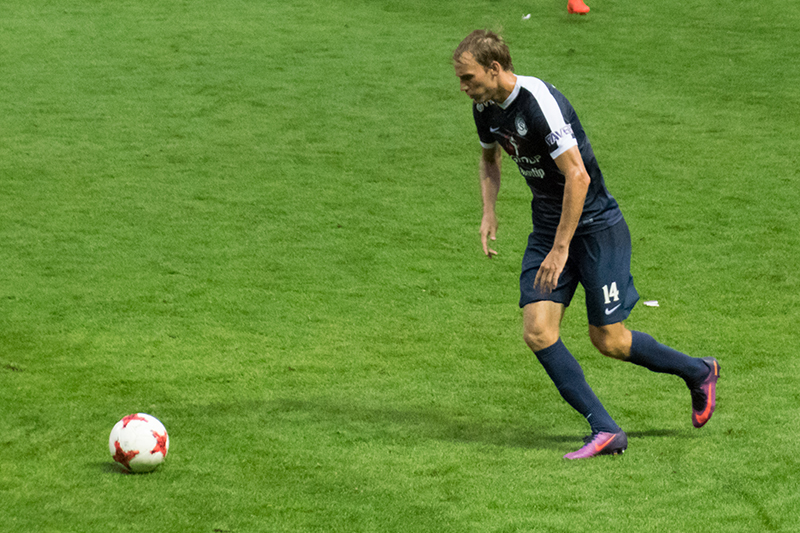

Personal information
- Date of birth: 24 September 1990 (age 36)
- Place of birth: Prague, Czechoslovakia
- Height: 1.81 m (5 ft 11 1/2 in)
- Position: Left back

Team information
- Current team: Viktoria Žižkov
- Number: 24

Senior career*
Years	Team	Apps	(Gls)
2009–2011	Sparta Prague II	15	(0)
2010–2011	→ Příbram (loan)	17	(0)
2011–2017	Příbram	97	(2)
2014–2015	→ Táborsko (loan)	16	(0)
2017–2022	1. FC Slovácko	65	(0)
2022–2024	Zbrojovka Brno	20	(0)
2024–	Viktoria Žižkov	36	(1)

International career
2006–2007	Czech Republic U17	10	(1)
2007–2008	Czech Republic U18	5	(0)
2008	Czech Republic U19	5	(0)
- * Club domestic league appearances and goals as of 28 May 2026

Josef Divíšek (born 24 September 1990) is a Czech professional footballer who plays for Viktoria Žižkov. He has played for the Czech Republic at junior level.

Divíšek made his Czech First League debut on 21 August 2010 in Příbram's match against Liberec.

On 13 January 2024, Divíšek signed a contract with Viktoria Žižkov.
