= Wale Musa Alli =

Nigerian footballer

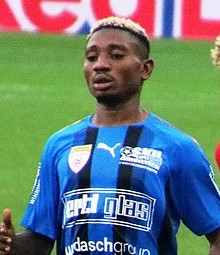
- Alli playing for SKU Amstetten, 2021

Personal information
- Full name: Wale Musa Alli
- Date of birth: 31 December 2000 (age 25)
- Place of birth: Lagos, Nigeria
- Height: 1.60 m (5 ft 3 in)
- Position: Winger

Team information
- Current team: Hapoel Ironi Kiryat Shmona

Senior career*
Years	Team	Apps	(Gls)
2019	Tallinna Kalev II	3	(1)
2019	Tallinna Kalev	33	(7)
2020–2022	SKU Amstetten	66	(8)
2022–2024	Zbrojovka Brno	39	(3)
2023–2024	→ České Budějovice (loan)	29	(4)
2024–2025	USM Alger	29	(1)
2025-	Ironi Kiryat Shmona	27	(1)
- * Club domestic league appearances and goals as of 24 June 2026

Wale Musa Alli (born 31 December 2000) is a Nigerian professional footballer who plays as a winger for Israeli Premier League club Ironi Kiryat Shmona.

== Career ==
In August 2023, Alli joined Czech First League side České Budějovice on a season-long loan deal with an option to buy.

On 25 November 2023, Alli was in the starting lineup against Slavia Prague at Fortuna Arena. With a man of the match performance Alli was targeted on multiple occasions by Slavia Prague players. Alli was substituted in the 85th minute due to injury following yet another reckless tackle by a Slavia Prague player.

On 6 August 2024, Alli signed a two-year contract with USM Alger.

== Honours ==
USM Alger

- Algerian Cup: 2024–25
