= Jakub Nečas =

Czech footballer

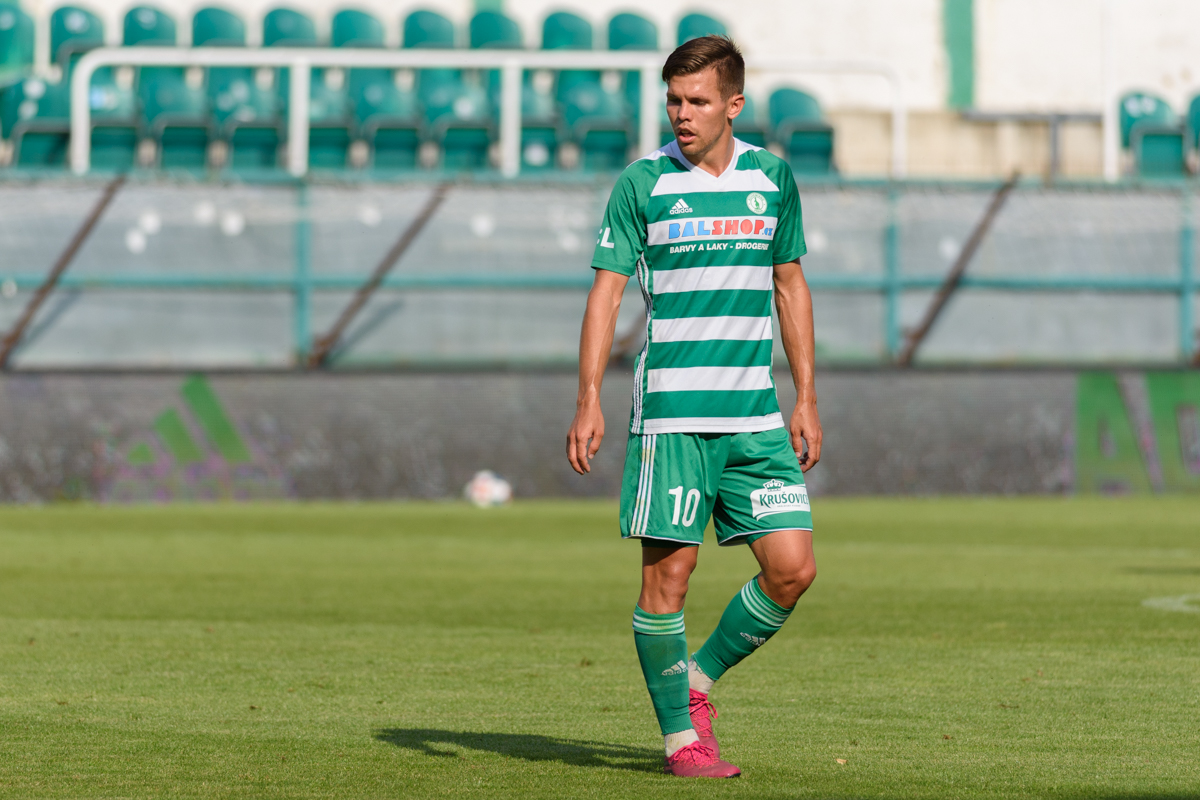

Personal information
- Date of birth: 26 January 1995 (age 31)
- Place of birth: Prague, Czech Republic
- Height: 1.74 m (5 ft 9 in)
- Position: Second striker

Team information
- Current team: Silon Táborsko
- Number: 17

Youth career
- Sparta Prague

Senior career*
| Years | Team | Apps | (Gls) |
| 2014–2018 | Sparta Prague | 0 | (0) |
| 2014 | → Pardubice (loan) | 12 | (0) |
| 2015–2016 | → Vlašim (loan) | 34 | (10) |
| 2017 | → Mladá Boleslav (loan) | 8 | (1) |
| 2017–2018 | → Bohemians 1905 (loan) | 15 | (1) |
| 2018–2021 | Bohemians 1905 | 67 | (5) |
| 2021 | Slovan Liberec | 23 | (0) |
| 2022–2023 | Zbrojovka Brno | 30 | (1) |
| 2023–2024 | Viagem Příbram | 30 | (6) |
| 2024– | Silon Táborsko | 16 | (1) |

International career^{‡}
| 2010–2011 | Czech Republic U16 | 4 | (0) |
| 2014 | Czech Republic U19 | 5 | (0) |
| 2014 | Czech Republic U20 | 1 | (0) |
| 2017 | Czech Republic U21 | 4 | (0) |
- * Club domestic league appearances and goals as of 4 January 2025 ‡ National team caps and goals as of 2 August 2022

Jakub Nečas (born 26 January 1995) is a Czech professional footballer who plays as a second striker for Silon Táborsko.

He made his senior league debut for Pardubice on 2 August 2014 in a Czech National Football League 1–1 home draw against Vlašim. He scored his first goals on 21 May 2016 in Vlašim's Czech National Football League 3–1 home win against Frýdek-Místek. He made his Czech First League debut for Mladá Boleslav on 19 February 2017 in a 1–1 away draw at Karviná and he scored his first top league goal in the next match – a 1–1 home draw against Teplice.
