= Jiří Texl =

Czech footballer

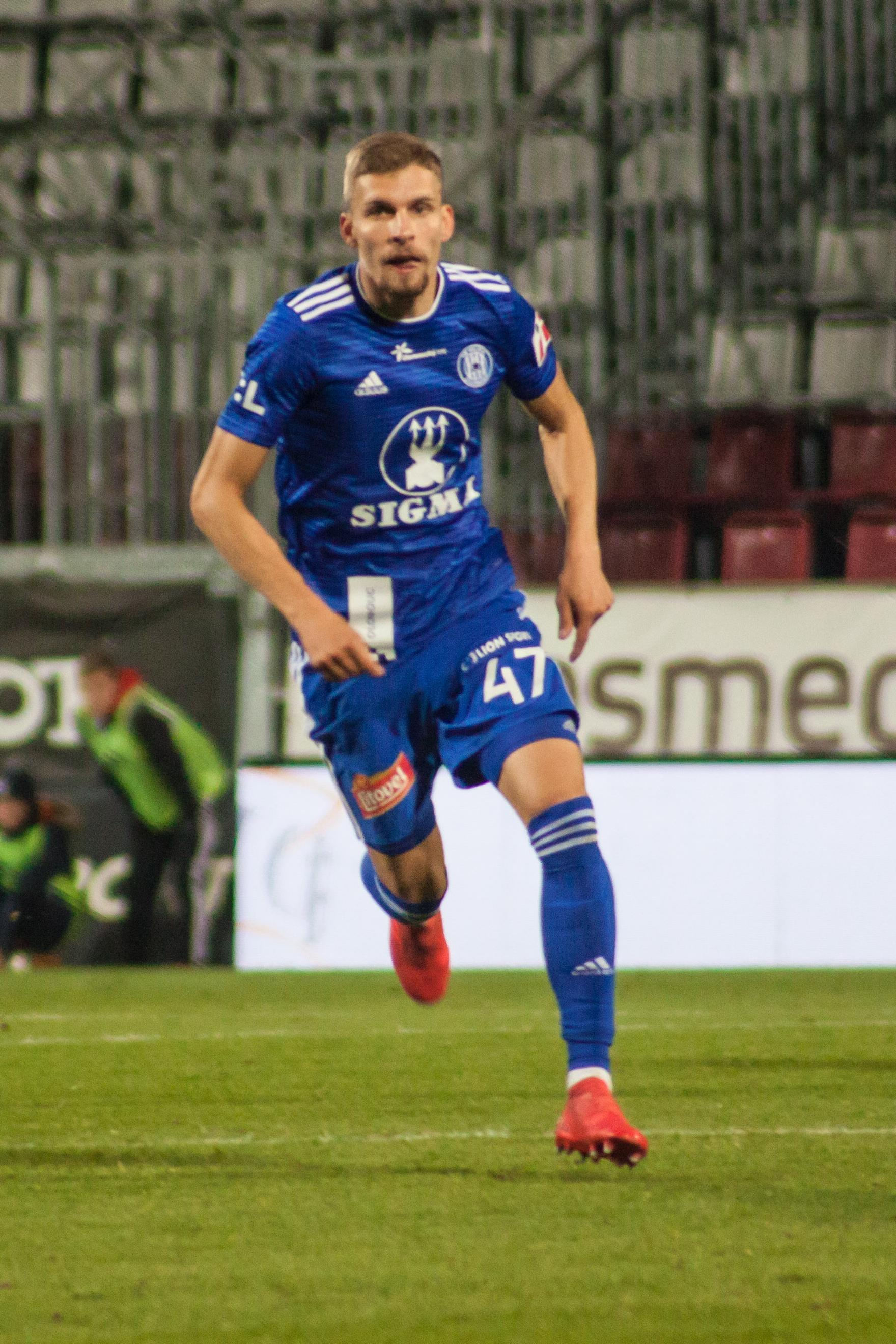

Personal information
- Date of birth: 3 January 1993 (age 33)
- Place of birth: Třebíč, Czech Republic
- Height: 1.81 m (5 ft 11 in)
- Position: Centre midfielder

Team information
- Current team: Zbrojovka Brno
- Number: 13

Youth career
- 1999-2002: TJ Vladislav
- 2002–2010: Třebíč
- 2010–2014: Sigma Olomouc

Senior career*
Years	Team	Apps	(Gls)
2014–2016	Sigma Olomouc B	56	(7)
2016–2021	Sigma Olomouc	56	(4)
2016–2017	→ Vítkovice (loan)	24	(5)
2020	→ Opava (loan)	21	(0)
2021	→ Zbrojovka Brno (loan)	14	(2)
2021–	Zbrojovka Brno	128	(5)
- * Club domestic league appearances and goals as of 28 May 2026

Jiří Texl (born 3 January 1993) is a Czech professional footballer who plays as a centre midfielder for FC Zbrojovka Brno.
