= Martin Berkovec =

Czech footballer

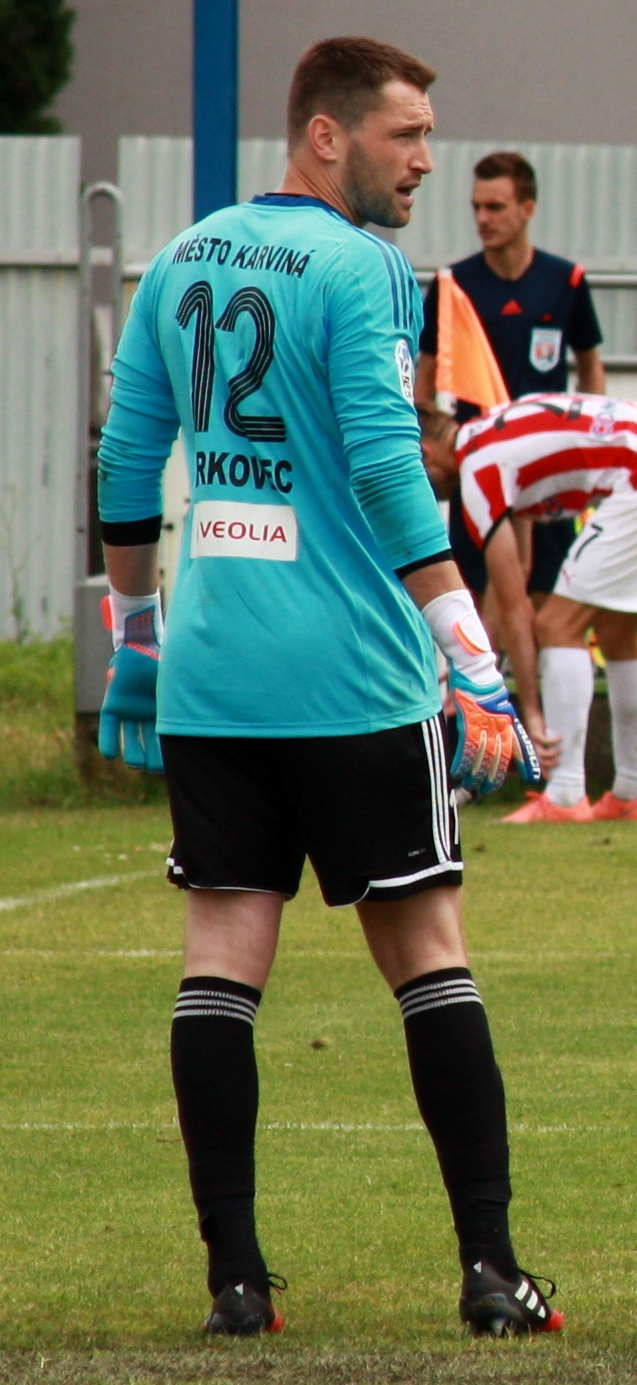

Personal information
- Full name: Martin Berkovec
- Date of birth: 12 February 1989 (age 37)
- Place of birth: Prague, Czechoslovakia
- Height: 1.90 m (6 ft 3 in)
- Position: Goalkeeper

Youth career
- 2009–2010: Slavia Prague

Senior career*
Years	Team	Apps	(Gls)
2010–2018	Slavia Prague	46	(0)
2010	→ Hlučín (loan)	6	(0)
2011	→ MAS Táborsko (loan)	7	(0)
2013–2014	→ Bohemians (loan)	26	(0)
2017	→ Bohemians (loan)	7	(0)
2017–2018	→ Karviná (loan)	13	(0)
2018–2019	Karviná	32	(0)
2019–2020	Žalgiris	29	(0)
2021–2024	Zbrojovka Brno	83	(0)
2024–2025	Slavia Prague B	0	(0)
2025	→ Sokol Živanice (loan)	11	(0)
- * Club domestic league appearances and goals as of 1 July 2025

Martin Berkovec (born 12 February 1989) is a Czech former footballer who last played as a goalkeeper for Slavia Prague B.

== Career ==
He made his league debut on 8 March 2015 in a match where FC Hlučín faced a 0–1 defeat against FK Fotbal Třinec in the Czech National Football League.

In February 2017, his life was saved by opposition team player Francis Koné, who prevented him from swallowing his tongue after he was knocked unconscious. As a result of this act, Francis Koné was awarded the FIFA Fair Play Award.

In January 2021, he signed a one-and-a-half-year contract with Czech side Zbrojovka Brno.

== Honours ==
Slavia Prague

- Czech First League: 2016–17

Žalgiris Vilnius

- A Lyga: 2020
