= Jakub Šural =

Czech footballer

Personal information
- Date of birth: 1 July 1996 (age 30)
- Place of birth: Brno, Czech Republic
- Height: 1.81 m (5 ft 11 1/2 in)
- Position: Right back

Team information
- Current team: FC Zbrojovka Brno
- Number: 23

Youth career
- 2002–2006: SK Blučina
- 2006–2014: FC Zbrojovka Brno

Senior career*
Years	Team	Apps	(Gls)
2014–	FC Zbrojovka Brno	151	(8)
2014	→ SK Líšeň (loan)	1	(0)
2014–2015	→ FK Baník Most (loan)	11	(0)

International career^{‡}
2013–2014	Czech Republic U-18	11	(0)
2014–2015	Czech Republic U-19	10	(0)
2015–	Czech Republic U-20	7	(0)
- * Club domestic league appearances and goals as of 15 June 2025 ‡ National team caps and goals as of 16 February 2023

Jakub Šural (born 1 July 1996) is a Czech football player who currently plays for FC Zbrojovka Brno. He is the younger brother of Josef Šural a footballer who died in an accident in Alanya, Turkey.
