= Adam Fousek =

Czech footballer

Personal information
- Date of birth: 8 March 1994 (age 32)
- Place of birth: Pardubice, Czech Republic
- Height: 1.85 m (6 ft 1 in)
- Position: Midfielder

Youth career
- 2000−2012: Pardubice

Senior career*
Years	Team	Apps	(Gls)
2012−2019	Pardubice	130	(27)
2013−2014	→ Mladá Boleslav (loan)	1	(0)
2019−2024	Zbrojovka Brno	120	(16)
2024−2025	Pardubice	8	(1)
- * Club domestic league appearances and goals

Adam Fousek (born 8 March 1994) is a Czech retired footballer who played as a midfielder. For most of his career, he played for Pardubice and Zbrojovka Brno.

== Club career ==
=== FC Zbrojovka Brno ===
On 22 June 2019, Fousek signed a three-year contract with Zbrojovka Brno.

=== FK Pardubice ===
On 27 June 2024, Fousek signed a contract with Pardubice.
